= They Knew What They Wanted =

They Knew What They Wanted may refer to:

- They Knew What They Wanted (play), a 1924 play written by Sidney Howard
- They Knew What They Wanted (film), a 1940 film based on the play, starring Carole Lombard
