= List of Yours Truly, Johnny Dollar episodes =

The detective radio drama Yours Truly, Johnny Dollar aired on the CBS Radio network from February 18, 1949, until September 30, 1962. Each weekly episode was 30 minutes in duration. However, during Bob Bailey's first year in the role, each story comprised five 15-minute episodes, airing Monday through Friday. There were two exceptions: "The Kranesburg Matter" comprised six episodes, and "The Phantom Chase Matter" comprised nine.

== Actor list ==
Actor playing Johnny Dollar	Episodes	Notes about episodes and air dates
Dick Powell	1	Audition show in 1948
Charles Russell	33	January 1949 – January 1950
Edmond O'Brien	103 (Note: There are 99 original scripts featuring Edmond O'Brien but four of these were repeated in the regular time slot and given a second episode number. At least one of these repeated episodes was rerecorded for the second airing.)	February 1950 – September 1952
John Lund	92 (Note: There are 91 original scripts featuring John Lund but one show was repeated in the regular time slot and given a second episode number. This episode The Jeanne Maxwell Matter, was recorded twice featuring two different casts.)	November 1952 – September 1954 (Note: The show was off the air from September 1954 until September 1955.)
Gerald Mohr	1	Audition show in 1955
Bob Bailey (Note: Unless stated otherwise, denotes the five-part episodes on air from October 3, 1955 until November 2, 1956. Episodes were 15 minutes in length and aired weeknights, Monday to Friday. Denotes regular once a week, 30-minute episodes.)	484	October 1955 – November 1960
Bob Readick	28	December 1960 – June 1961
Mandel Kramer	67	June 1961 – September 1962

== Episode list ==
=== 1948–1950: Dick Powell & Charles Russell ===
Episode #	Title	Writer(s)	Original airdate	Recorded	Notes (Note: Notable co-stars listed, in alphabetical order.)
Audition	"Milford Brooks III"			December 7, 1948	The original script for this episode has the lead character known as "Lloyd London", but this was apparently changed before the actual recording. (Note: Internet Archive repository of playable single episodes, including the audition episode) Co-starring Daws Butler, William Conrad and Joseph Kearns.
Audition	"Robert W. Perry Case"			January 14, 1949	
1	"The Parakoff Policy"		February 18, 1949		
2	"The Slow Boat From China"		February 25, 1949		
3	"Robert Perry Case"		March 4, 1949		
4	"Murder Is a Merry-Go-Round"		March 11, 1949		
5	"Milford Brooks III Matter"		March 25, 1949		Guest starring future Johnny Dollar Bob Bailey (actor).
6	"Stolen Portrait"		April 1, 1949		
7	"The Case Of The Foxy Terrier"		April 8, 1949		
8	"The Case Of The $100,000 Legs"		April 15, 1949		
9	"The Case Of Barton Drake"		April 22, 1949		
10	"Here Comes The Death Of The Party"	Paul Dubley; Gil Doud	July 17, 1949	July 17, 1949	Also known as "The Case of the Poisonous Grapevine". Co-starring John Dehner and Paul Dubov.
11	"Who Took the Taxis For A Ride"	Paul Dubley; Gil Doud	July 24, 1949	July 24, 1949	Also known as "Who Took the Taxis". Co-starring Paul Dubov.
12	"How Much Bourbon Can Flow Under The Bridgework"	Paul Dubley; Gil Doud	July 31, 1949	July 31, 1949	Co-starring Larry Dobkin, John Dehner, Don Diamond and Barney Phillips.
13	"Murder Ain't Minor"	Paul Dubley; Gil Doud	August 7, 1949	August 7, 1949	Also known as "The Case of Bonnie Goodwin". Co-starring Larry Dobkin, Paul Dubov, Georgia Ellis and Martha Wentworth.
14	"How Not To Take A Vacation In Fairfield County"	Paul Dubley; Gil Doud	August 14, 1949	August 14, 1949	Also known as "Death Takes A Working Day". Co-starring Larry Dobkin, Doris Singleton, and Herb Vigran.
15	"Out Of The Fire Into The Frying Pan"	Paul Dubley; Gil Doud	August 21, 1949	August 21, 1949	Also known as "The Prize Hog Bodyguard". Co-starring Parley Baer, Pinto Colvig, John Dehner, Paul Dubov and Jack Kruschen.
16	"How I Turned A Luxury Liner Into a Battleship"	Paul Dubley; Gil Doud	August 28, 1949	August 28, 1949	Co-starring John Dehner, Larry Dobkin and Paul Dubov.
17	"The Expiring Nickels and the Egyptian Jackpot"		September 4, 1949		
18	"The Search For Michelle Marsh"		September 25, 1949		
19	"The Fishing Boat Affair"		October 1, 1949		
20	"The Racehorse Piledriver Matter"		October 8, 1949		
21	"Dr Otto Schmedlich"		October 15, 1949		
22	"Witness, Witness, Who's Got The Witness"		October 22, 1949		
23	"The Little Man Who Wasn't There"		October 29, 1949		
24	"Mother Call My Draftboard; I'm Leaving the Country Again"		November 5, 1949		Also known as "The South Sea Adventure".
25	"Who'd Like To Rock The Old Doll To Sleep"		November 12, 1949		Also known as "The Melanie Carter Matter".
26	"Skulduggery In The Skull Canyon Mine"		November 26, 1949		
27	"Bodyguard To Anne Connelly"		December 3, 1949		
28	"The Circus Animal Show Matter"		December 10, 1949		
29	"Haiti Adventure Matter"		December 17, 1949		
30	"How I Played Santa Claus And Almost Got Left Holding The Bag"		December 24, 1949		Also known as "The Department Store Swindle Matter".
31	"You Lead A Diamond, Mother, And The Game Will Really Get Started"		December 31, 1949		Also known as "The Diamond Protector Matter". Missing episode.
32	"Press Out My Asbestos Dinner Jacket, Mother, I'm Going To Smoke"		January 7, 1950		Also known as "The Firebug Hunter Matter". Missing episode.
33	"The Missing Chinese Stripper"		January 14, 1950		Missing episode.

=== 1950–1952: Edmond O'Brien ===
Episode #	Title	Writer(s)	Original airdate	Recorded	Notes
34	"Death Takes a Working Day"		February 3, 1950		Also known as "The Loyal B. Martin Matter".
35	"The S.S. Malay Trader Ship"		February 10, 1950		
36	"Mr. and Mrs. Arbuthnel Trump"		February 17, 1950		Also known as "The Gravedigger's Spades". Co-starring Peggy Webber, Parley Baer, Hugh Thomas, Dick Ryan, Jess Kirkpatrick, Mary Shipp.
37	"The Archeologist"		February 24, 1950		Also known as "The Disappearance Of Bruce Lambert".
38	"Bodyguard to the Late Robert W. Perry"		March 3, 1950		
39	"How I Got A Wildcat Oil Operation By The Tail, Or The Youthful Millionaire"		March 10, 1950		Also known as "Alec Jefferson, The Youthful Millionaire".
40	"The Eighty Five Little Minks"		March 14, 1950		
41	"The Man Who Wrote Himself To Death"		March 21, 1950		Co-starring Larry Dobkin and Lurene Tuttle.
42	"The Village Scene Matter"		March 28, 1950		Also known as "The Missing Masterpiece". Co-starring Charles McGraw and Tylor McVey.
43	"The Story Of The Big Red Schoolhouse"		April 4, 1950		Co-starring Bill Conrad, Virginia Gregg and Vic Perrin.
44	"The Dead First-Helpers"		April 11, 1950		Co-starring Raymond Burr.
45	"The Story Of The 10:08"		April 18, 1950		Co-starring John Dehner and Ted De Corsia.
46	"The Pearl Carrasa Matter"		April 25, 1950		Co-starring Bill Conrad, Bill Johnstone and Howard McNear.
47	"The Abel Tackett Matter"		May 2, 1950		
48	"The Harold Trandem Matter"		May 9, 1950		Co-starring Raymond Burr and Gloria Blondell.
49	"The Sidney Rykoff Matter"		May 16, 1950		Co-starring John McIntyre and Howard McNear.
50	"The Earl Chadwick Matter"		May 23, 1950		Co-starring John Dehner and Virginia Gregg.
51	"The Port-au-Prince Matter"		May 30, 1950		Co-starring Willard Waterman.
52	"The Collegio Diamond Matter"		June 8, 1950		
53	"The Arrowcraft Matter"		June 15, 1950		
54	"The London Matter"		June 22, 1950		
55	"The Barbara James Matter"		June 29, 1950		
56	"The Bello-Horizonte Railroad"		July 6, 1950		
57	"The Calgary Matter"		July 13, 1950		
58	"The Henry J. Unger Matter"		July 20, 1950		Co-starring Raymond Burr and William Conrad
59	"The Tell-All Book Matter"		July 27, 1950		
60	"Blood River Matter"		August 3, 1950		
61	"The Hartford Alliance Matter"		August 10, 1950		
62	"The Mickey McQueen Matter"	Gil Doud	August 17, 1950		
63	"The Trans-Pacific Export Matter"		August 24, 1950		
64	"The Virginia Beach Matter"		August 31, 1950		
65	"The Howard Caldwell Matter"		September 30, 1950		
66	"The Richard Splain Matter"		October 7, 1950		
67	"The Yankee Pride Matter"		October 14, 1950		
68	"The Jack Madigan Matter"		October 21, 1950		
69	"The Joan Sebastian Matter"		October 28, 1950		
70	"The Queen Anne Pistols Matter"		November 4, 1950		
71	"The Adam Kegg Matter"		November 11, 1950		
72	"The Nora Faulkner Matter"	Gil Doud	November 18, 1950		Co-starring Parley Baer, John Dehner, Virginia Gregg and Vic Perrin.
73	"The Woodward Manila Matter"	Gil Doud	November 25, 1950		Co-starring Bill Conrad and Jack Kruschen.
74	"The Leland Blackburn Matter"	Gil Doud	December 16, 1950	December 2, 1950	Also known as "The Blackburn Matter". Co-starring John Dehner, Larry Dobkin and Georgia Ellis.
75	"The Montevideo Matter"	Gil Doud	December 23, 1950		Co-starring Terry Kilburn.
76	"The Ruby Valentine Matter"	Gil Doud	December 30, 1950		
77	"The Adolph Schoman Matter"	Gil Doud	January 6, 1951		Co-starring Francis X. Bushman and Virginia Gregg.
78	"The Port O'Call Matter"	Gil Doud	January 13, 1951		Co-starring Hy Averback, Ed Begley, Virginia Gregg, and Howard McNear.
79	"The David Rocky Matter"	Gil Doud	January 20, 1951		Co-starring Bill Conrad and Jay Novello.
80	"The Weldon Bragg Matter"	Gil Doud	January 27, 1951		Co-starring Bill Conrad, Virginia Gregg and Lee Patrick.
81	"The Monoploy Matter"	Gil Doud	February 3, 1951	February 3, 1951	Co-starring Parley Baer.
82	"The Lloyd Hammerly Matter"	Gil Doud	February 10, 1951	February 10, 1951	Co-starring Francis X. Bushman, Virginia Gregg, and Jack Kruschen.
83	"The Vivian Fair Matter"	Gil Doud	February 17, 1951	February 17, 1951	
84	"The Jarvis Wilder Matter"	Gil Doud	February 24, 1951		Co-starring Parley Baer and Bill Conrad.
85	"The Celia Woodstock Matter"	Gil Doud	March 3, 1951		Co-starring Raymond Burr and Francis X. Bushman.
86	"The Stanley Springs Matter"	Gil Doud	March 10, 1951		Co-starring Raymond Burr, Bill Conrad, and Olga San Juan.
87	"The Emil Lovett Matter"	Gil Doud	March 17, 1951		Co-starring Bill Conrad.
88	"The Byron Hayes Matter"	Gil Doud	March 24, 1951		Co-starring Ed Begley, and Lee Patrick.
89	"The Jackie Cleaver Matter"	Gil Doud	March 31, 1951	December 9, 1950	Co-starring Hy Averback, Ed Begley and Virginia Gregg. Dec 9 was preempted
90	"The Edward French Matter"	Gil Doud	April 7, 1951	March 22, 1951	
91	"The Mickey McQueen Matter"	Gil Doud	April 14, 1951	March 21, 1951	Repeat of episode 63. Co-starring Raymond Burr and Bill Conrad.
92	"The Willard South Matter"	Gil Doud	April 21, 1951		Co-starring Jan Miner.
93	"The Month-End Raid Matter"	Gil Doud	April 28, 1951		Co-starring Virginia Gregg.
94	"The Virginia Towne Matter"	Gil Doud	May 5, 1951	April 25, 1951	Co-starring Ed Begley and Virginia Gregg.
95	"The Marie Meadows Matter"	Gil Doud	May 12, 1951	April 27, 1951	
96	"The Jane Doe Matter"	Gil Doud	May 19, 1951	May 16, 1951	Co-starring Raymond Burr, Virginia Gregg and Howard McNear.
97	"The Lillis Bond Matter"	Gil Doud	May 26, 1951	May 17, 1951	
98	"The Soderbury, Maine Matter"	Gil Doud	June 2, 1951	May 24, 1951	Co-starring Virginia Gregg and Howard McNear.
99	"The George Farmer Matter"	Blake Edwards	June 9, 1951		Co-starring Hy Averback and Virginia Gregg.
100	"The Arthur Boldrick Matter"	Gil Doud	June 16, 1951	June 6, 1951	Co-starring Parley Baer, Virginia Gregg and Jeanne Bates.
101	"The Malcolm Wish, MD Matter"	Gil Doud	June 20, 1951	May 31, 1951	Co-starring Raymond Burr and Virginia Gregg.
102	"The Hatchet House Theft Matter"	Gil Doud	June 27, 1951	June 7, 1951	Co-starring Virginia Gregg and Ben Wright.
103	"The Alonzo Chapman Matter"	Gil Doud	July 4, 1951	June 9, 1951	Co-starring Hy Averback and Virginia Gregg.
104	"The Fairway Matter"	Gil Doud	July 11, 1951	June 15, 1951	Co-starring Raymond Burr, Virginia Gregg, and Vic Perrin.
105	"The Neal Breer Matter"	Gil Doud	July 18, 1951	June 18, 1951	Co-starring Ralph Moody.
106	"The Blind Item Matter"	Blake Edwards; Dick Quine	July 25, 1951	June 20, 1951	Co-starring Hy Averback, Virginia Gregg and Jack Kruschen.
107	"The Horace Lockhart Matter"	Gil Doud	August 1, 1951	June 21, 1951	Co-starring Hy Averback, Mary Jane Croft, Virginia Gregg, and Howard McNear.
108	"The Morgan Fry Matter"	Gil Doud	August 8, 1951		Co-starring Bill Conrad and Virginia Gregg.
109	"The Lucky Costa Matter"	Gil Doud	August 15, 1951		Co-starring Hy Averback and Virginia Gregg.
110	"The Cumberland Theft Matter"	Gil Doud	August 22, 1951		Co-starring Parley Baer, Virginia Gregg and Howard McNear.
111	"The Leland Case Matter"	Gil Doud	August 29, 1951	August 22, 1951	Co-starring Parley Baer, Howard McNear and John Stephenson (actor).
112	"The Rum Barrel Matter"	Gil Doud	September 12, 1951	June 22, 1951	Co-starring Hy Averback, Bill Conrad, Ted De Corsia and Virginia Gregg.
113	"The Cuban Jewel Matter"	Blake Edwards	September 19, 1951	September 6, 1951	Co-starring Jack Kruschen and Barney Phillips.
114	"The Protection Matter"	Blake Edwards	September 26, 1951	September 13, 1951	Co-starring Hy Averback, Raymond Burr, Bill Conrad and Jay Novello.
115	"The Douglas Taylor Matter"	Gil Doud	October 6, 1951	September 27, 1951	Co-starring Hy Averback, Raymond Burr and Joseph Kearns.
116	"The Millard Ward Matter"	Gil Doud	October 13, 1951	September 13, 1951	Co-starring Hy Averback, Bill Conrad and Barton Yarborough.
117	"The Janet Abbe Matter"	Gil Doud	October 20, 1951	September 6, 1951	Co-starring Jack Kruschen, Nestor Paiva and Barney Phillips.
118	"The Tolhurst Theft Matter"	Gil Doud	October 27, 1951	October 18, 1951	Co-starring Parley Baer, Virginia Gregg, Howard McNear and Bob Sweeney.
119	"The Hannibal Murphy Matter"	Gil Doud	November 3, 1951	October 26, 1951	Co-starring Virginia Gregg, Dan O'Herlihy and Ben Wright.
120	"The Birdy Baskerville Matter"	Blake Edwards	November 10, 1951	October 25, 1951	Co-starring Virginia Gregg and Howard McNear.
121	"The Merrill Kent Matter"	Gil Doud	November 17, 1951	October 6, 1951	Co-starring Hy Averback, Raymond Burr, Virginia Gregg and Joseph Kearns.
122	"The Youngstown Credit Group Matter"	Gil Doud	December 8, 1951	November 3, 1951	Co-starring Parley Baer, Ed Begley and Virginia Gregg.
123	"The Paul Barberis Matter"	Gil Doud	December 15, 1951	October 11, 1951	Co-starring Raymond Burr and Howard McNear.
124	"The Maynard Collins Matter"	Kathleen Hito	December 22, 1951	November 2, 1951	Co-starring Hy Averback, Ed Begley, Virginia Gregg and Howard McNear.
125	"The Alma Scott Matter"	Gil Doud	December 29, 1951	November 8, 1951	Co-starring Hy Averback and Virginia Gregg.
126	"The Glen English Matter"	Gil Doud	January 5, 1952	November 9, 1951	Co-starring Bill Conrad and Jay Novello.
127	"The Baxter Matter"	Blake Edwards	January 12, 1952	November 1, 1951	Co-starring Jim Backus, Virginia Gregg and Howard McNear
128	"The Amelia Harwell Matter"	Gil Doud	July 2, 1952	June 6, 1952	Co-starring Virginia Gregg and Vic Perrin.
129	"The Yankee Pride Matter"	Gil Doud	July 9, 1952	June 3, 1952	Co-starring Virginia Gregg, Jack Kruschen and Ben Wright.
130	"The Henry Page Matter"	Gil Doud	July 16, 1952	June 12, 1952	Co-starring Hy Averback, Virginia Gregg, Charlie Lyons and Howard McNear.
131	"The Montevideo Matter"	Gill Doud	July 23, 1952	June 5, 1952	Co-starring Hy Averback and Jay Novello.
132	"The New Bedford Morgue Matter"	Gil Doud	July 30, 1952	June 10, 1952	Co-starring Francis X. Bushman and Charlie Lyons.
133	"The Sidney Mann Matter"	Gil Doud	August 6, 1952	June 13, 1952	Co-starring Hans Conried and Virginia Gregg.
134	"The Tom Hickman Matter"	Gil Doud	August 13, 1952	June 11, 1952	Co-starring Raymond Burr and Charlie Lyons.
135	"The Edith Maxwell Matter"	Gil Doud	August 20, 1952	June 9, 1952	Co-starring Virginia Gregg, Joseph Kearns, Charlie Lyons and Lee Patrick.
136	"The Yankee Pride Matter"	Gil Doud	August 27, 1952	June 3, 1952	Repeat of episode 131. Co-starring Virginia Gregg, Jack Kruschen and Ben Wright.
137	"The Montevideo Matter"	Gil Doud	September 3, 1952	June 5, 1952	Repeat of episode 133. Co-starring Hy Averback and Jay Novello.

=== 1952–1954: John Lund ===
Episode #	Title	Writer(s)	Original airdate	Recorded	Notes
Audition	"The Trans-Pacific Matter"	E. Jack Neuman	November 24, 1952		Co-starring Joseph Kearns.
138	"The Singapore Arson Matter"	Gil Doud	November 28, 1952	November 24, 1952	Co-starring John McIntire and Jay Novella.
139	"The James Clayton Matter"	E. Jack Neuman	December 5, 1952	December 1, 1952	Co-starring Virginia Gregg, Joseph Kearns, John McIntire and Vic Perrin. (This exact storyline, with a different lead-in premise and renamed characters, was re-used in a five-part version with Bob Bailey, "The Shepherd Matter", broadcast April 16–20, 1956. Writing credit for that story was listed as John Dawson, a pen name of E. Jack Neuman.)
140	"The Elliott Champion Matter"	E. Jack Neuman	December 12, 1952	December 10, 1952	Co-starring Francis X. Bushman.
141	"The New Cambridge Matter"	E. Jack Neuman	December 19, 1952	December 8, 1952	
142	"The Walter Patterson Matter"	E. Jack Neuman	December 26, 1952	December 2, 1952	Co-starring Virginia Gregg and John McIntire.
143	"The Baltimore Matter"	E. Jack Neuman	January 2, 1953	December 23, 1952	Co-starring John McIntire.
144	"The Thelma Ibsen Matter"	E. Jack Neuman	January 9, 1953	January 5, 1953	Co-starring Virginia Gregg, Joseph Kearns and Tom Tully. (This is one of several John Lund episodes by E. Jack Neuman to be later expanded into five-part Bob Bailey serials under Neuman's pseudonym "John Dawson." With minor changes such as the names, and the addition of plot elements from Episode 163, "The Emily Braddock Matter," this exact plot was used as the basis for "The Broderick Matter," which aired November 14 - 18, 1955. In both this and the serial, Dollar calls the encounter his first experience with an intended suicide).
145	"The Starlet Matter"	Fargo Epstein; Daphne Fenster	January 16, 1953	January 8, 1953	Co-starring Raymond Burr, Virginia Gregg, John McIntire and Vic Perrin.
146	"The Marigold Matter"	E. Jack Neuman	January 23, 1953	January 9, 1953	Co-starring Parley Baer, Howard Culver and Virginia Gregg.
147	"Kay Bellamy Matter"	Joel Murcott	January 30, 1953	January 13, 1953	Co-starring Hy Averback, Raymond Burr, Sandra Gould, Jay Novello and Benny Rubin.
148	"The Chicago Fraud Matter"	E. Jack Neuman	February 6, 1953	January 27, 1953	Co-starring John McIntire.
149	"The Lancer Jewelry Matter"	E. Jack Neuman	February 13, 1953	February 4, 1953	Co-starring Parley Baer, Bob Bailey and Virginia Gregg.
150	"The Latourette Matter"	E. Jack Neuman	February 20, 1953	February 11, 1953	Co-starring Virginia Gregg and John McIntire.
151	"The Underwood Matter"	E. Jack Neuman	February 27, 1953	February 18, 1953	Co-starring John McIntire.
152	"The Jeanne Maxwell Matter"	Gil Doud	March 6, 1953	December 19, 1952	Co-starring Ted De Corsia, Howard McNear and Barney Phillips.
153	"The Birdy Baskerville Matter"	Blake Edwards	March 10, 1953		Co-starring John McIntire and Howard McNear.
154	"The King's Necklace Matter"	Sidney Marshall	March 17, 1953		Co-starring Howard McNear, Nestor Paive and Tom Tully.
155	"The Syndicate Matter"	Joel Murcott	March 24, 1953	March 9, 1953	Co-starring Hy Averback, Parley Baer, Virginia Gregg, Joseph Kearns, John McIntire and Tom Tully.
156	"The Lester James Matter"	E. Jack Neuman	March 31, 1953	March 11, 1953	Co-starring Bill Conrad, Virginia Gregg and Howard McNear.
157	"The Enoch Arden Matter"	Joel Murcott	April 7, 1953	March 10, 1953	Co-starring John McIntire and Howard McNear.
158	"The Madison Matter"	E. Jack Neuman	April 14, 1953	March 9, 1953	Co-starring Parley Baer, Virginia Gregg, Joseph Kearns, John McIntire and Tom Tully.
159	"The Dameron Matter"	E. Jack Neuman	April 21, 1953	March 11, 1953	Co-starring Bill Conrad and Howard McNear.
160	"The San Antonio Matter"	E. Jack Neuman	April 28, 1953	March 4, 1953	Co-starring Virginia Gregg, Joseph Kearns, John McIntire and Jay Novello
161	"The Blackmail Matter"	Blake Edwards	May 5, 1953	March 16, 1953	Co-starring Hy Averback, Virginia Gregg and Hal March.
162	"The Rochester Theft Matter"	E. Jack Neuman	May 12, 1953	February 23, 1953	Co-starring Virginia Gregg, John McIntire and Vic Perrin.
163	"The Emily Braddock Matter"	E. Jack Neuman	May 19, 1953		Co-starring Joan Banks, Bill Conrad and John McIntire. (Major plot elements of this episode were combined with the overall plot of Episode 144, "The Thelma Ibsen Matter" (aired January 9, 1953 and also written by E. Jack Neuman), to produce the five-part Bob Bailey episode "The Broderick Matter," which aired November 14 - 18, 1955. The author listed for the remake is John Dawson, a pseudonym of Neuman's).
164	"The Brisbane Fraud Matter"	E. Jack Neuman	May 26, 1953	March 4, 1953	Co-starring Virginia Gregg, Joseph Kearns and Jay Novello. (This exact plot, but with different names, was later reused as the basis of “The Callicles Matter,” a five-part episode starring Bob Bailey, which was broadcast from April 30 - May 4, 1956. The writing credit for the remake is listed as “John Dawson,” which was a pseudonym for E. Jack Neuman).
165	"The Costain Matter"	E. Jack Neuman	June 2, 1953	March 16, 1953	Co-starring Hy Averback, Virginia Gregg and Hal March.
166	"The Oklahoma Red Matter"	E. Jack Neuman	June 9, 1953	June 9, 1953	Co-starring Parley Baer and John McIntire.
167	"The Emil Carter Matter"	Gil Doud	June 16, 1953	June 16, 1953	Co-starring Hy Averback, Mary Jane Croft, Hal March and Frank Nelson.
168	"The Jonathan Bellows Matter"	Blake Edwards	June 23, 1953	June 23, 1953	Co-starring Virginia Gregg, Howard McNear and Ralph Moody.
169	"The Jones Matter"	Les Crutchfield	June 30, 1953	June 30, 1953	Co-starring Parley Baer, Virginia Gregg, Hal March and Vic Perrin.
170	"The Bishop Blackmail Matter"	Blake Edwards	July 7, 1953	July 7, 1953	
171	"The Shayne Bombing Matter"	Blake Edwards	July 14, 1953		Co-starring Hy Averback and Frank Nelson. Co-starring Virginia Gregg, Junius Matthews and Frank Nelson.
172	"The Black Doll Matter"	Blake Edwards	July 21, 1953	July 21, 1953	Co-starring Hy Averback and Frank Nelson.
173	"The James Forbes Matter"	Blake Edwards	July 28, 1953		Co-starring Mary Jane Croft.
174	"The Voodoo Matter"	Blake Edwards	August 4, 1953		Co-starring Bill Conrad, Jester Hairston and Ben Wright.
175	"The Nancy Shaw Matter"	Blake Edwards	August 11, 1953		Co-starring Mary Jane Croft and Vic Perrin.
176	"The Isabelle James Matter"	Blake Edwards	August 18, 1953		Also known as "The Kimball Matter". Co-starring Parley Baer and Howard McNear.
177	"The Nelson Matter"	Blake Edwards	August 25, 1953		Co-starring Bill Conrad and Joseph Kearns.
178	"The Stanley Price Matter"	Blake Edwards	September 1, 1953		Co-starring Kenny Delmar, Howard McNear and Jay Novello.
179	"The Lester Matson Matter"	Blake Edwards	September 8, 1953		Co-starring John Larch and Hal March.
180	"The Oscar Clark Matter"	Blake Edwards	September 15, 1953		Co-starring Parley Baer, Francis X. Bushman, Barney Phillips and Tom Tully.
181	"The William Post Matter"	Blake Edwards	September 22, 1953		Co-starring Hy Averback, Mary Jane Croft, Howard McNear and Benny Rubin.
182	"The Anita Buddha Matter"		September 29, 1953		
183	"The Alfred Chambers Matter"	Blake Edwards	October 6, 1953		Co-starring Marvin Miller and Hal March.
184	"The Philip Morey Matter"	Blake Edwards	October 13, 1953		Co-starring Hy Averback.
185	"The Allen Saxton Matter"	Blake Edwards	October 20, 1953	October 15, 1953	Co-starring Hy Averback, Virginia Gregg, Hal March and Jay Novello.
186	"The Howard Arnold Matter"	Blake Edwards	October 27, 1953		Co-starring Hy Averback, Bill Conrad, John McInitre and Frank Nelson.
187	"The Gino Gambona Matter"	Blake Edwards	November 3, 1953		Co-starring Virginia Gregg, John McIntire and Jay Novello.
188	"The Bobby Foster Matter"	Blake Edwards	November 10, 1953		Co-starring John McIntire, Frank Nelson and Tom Tully.
189	"The Nathan Gayles Matter"	Blake Edwards	November 17, 1953		Co-starring Mary Jane Croft.
190	"The Independent Diamond Traders Matter"	Don Sanford	November 24, 1953		Co-starring Parley Baer, Virginia Gregg, John McIntire and Howard McNear.
191	"The Monopoly Matter"	Gil Doud	December 1, 1953		Co-starring Parley Baer, Howard McNear,
192	"The Barton Baker Matter"	Blake Edwards	December 8, 1953	July 14, 1953	Co-starring Junius Matthews and Frank Nelson.
193	"The Milk And Honey Matter"	Sidney Marshall	December 15, 1953		Co-starring Don Diamond, Hal March, Jay Novello and Ben Wright.
194	"The Rudy Valentine Matter"	Gil Doud	December 22, 1953		Co-starring Mary Jane Croft and Joseph Kearns.
195	"The Ben Bryson Matter"	Les Crutchfield	December 29, 1953		Co-starring Don Diamond and Tom Tully.
196	"The Fairway Matter"		January 5, 1954		
197	"The Celia Woodstock Matter"		January 12, 1954		
198	"The Draminski Matter"		January 19, 1954		
199	"The Beauregard Matter"		January 26, 1954		
200	"The Paul Gorrell Matter"	Gil Doud	February 2, 1954		Co-starring Parley Baer and Tom Tully.
201	"The Harpooned Angler Matter"	Sidney Marshall	February 9, 1954	January 29, 1954	Co-starring Larry Dobkin, Howard Culver and Virginia Gregg.
202	"The Uncut Canary Matter"		February 16, 1954	January 12, 1954	
203	"The Classified Killer Matter"	Sidney Marshall	February 23, 1954		Co-starring Bob Bailey, Bill Conrad, Virginia Gregg and Junius Matthews.
204	"The Road-Test Matter"	David Chandler	March 2, 1954		Co-starring Eleanor Audley, Hy Averback, Virginia Gregg and Joseph Kearns.
205	"The Terrified Tuan Matter"	Sidney Marshall	March 9, 1954		Co-starring Jack Edwards, Virginia Gregg, Howard McNear and Ben Wright.
206	"The Berlin Matter"	Morton Fine; David Friedkin	March 16, 1954		Co-starring Virginia Gregg, Hal March and Benny Rubin.
207	"The Piney Corners Matter"	Les Crutchfield	March 23, 1954		Co-starring Parley Baer and Virginia Gregg.
208	"The Undried Fiddle Back Matter"	Sidney Marshall	March 30, 1954		Co-starring Bill Conrad, Mary Jane Croft and Virginia Gregg.
209	"The Sulphur And Brimstone Matter"	Sidney Marshall	April 6, 1954		Co-starring Howard Culver, Don Diamond and Jay Novello.
210	"The Magnolia And Honeysuckle Matter"	Sidney Marshall	April 13, 1954		Co-starring Virginia Gregg, Lee Patrick, Hal March and Howard McNear.
211	"The Nathan Swing Matter"	Blake Edwards	April 20, 1954		Co-starring Virginia Gregg and Jay Novello.
212	"The Frustrated Phoenix Matter"	Sidney Marshall	April 27, 1954		Co-starring Bill Conrad, Virginia Gregg, Dan O'Herlihy and Junius Matthews.
213	"The Dan Frank Matter"	Les Crutchfield	May 4, 1954	March 25, 1954	Co-starring Virginia Gregg, Joseph Kearns and Frank Nelson.
214	"The Aromatic Cicatrix Matter"	Sidney Marshall	May 11, 1954		Co-starring Virginia Gregg, Hal March and Ben Wright.
215	"The Bilked Baroness Matter"	Sidney Marshall	May 18, 1954		Co-starring Parley Baer, Virginia Gregg, Hal March and Jay Novello.
216	"The Punctilious Firebug Matter"	Sidney Marshall	May 25, 1954		Co-starring Virginia Gregg, Hal March and Barney Phillips.
217	"The Temperamental Tote Board Matter"	Sidney Marshall	June 1, 1954		Co-starring Don Diamond, Ted De Corsia and Hal March.
218	"The Sarah Dearing Matter"	Don Sanford	June 8, 1954	June 6, 1954	Co-starring Don Diamond, Jack Edwards and Tom Tully.
219	"The Patterson Transport Matter"	Sidney Marshall	June 15, 1954		Also known as "The Perilous Parcel Matter". Co-starring Hy Averback, Ed Begley, Virginia Gregg, Lee Patrick and Hal March.
220	"The Arthur Boldrick Matter"	Gil Doud	June 22, 1954	December 23, 1953	Co-starring Parley Baer, Virginia Gregg, Frank Nelson and Tom Tully.
221	"The Woodward Manila Matter"	Gil Doud	June 29, 1954	June 10, 1954	Co-starring Ed Begley, Don Diamond, Joseph Kearns, Berry Kroeger and Jay Novello.
222	"The Jan Brueghel Matter"	Sidney Marshall	July 6, 1954	June 8, 1954	Co-starring Parley Baer, Virginia Gregg, Howard McNear and Hal March.
223	"The Carboniferous Dolomite Matter"	Sidney Marshall	July 13, 1954	May 14, 1954	Co-starring Hy Averback, Virginia Gregg, Hal March, Marvin Miller and Jay Novello.
224	"The Jeanne Maxwell Matter"	Gil Doud	July 20, 1954	June 5, 1954	Repeat of episode 154. Co-starring Parley Baer, Virginia Gregg, Howard McNear and Hal March.
225	"The Radioactive Gold Matter"	Sidney Marshall	July 27, 1954	July 27, 1954	Co-starring Hy Averback, Mary Jane Croft, Joseph Kearns and Lou Merrill
226	"The Hampton Line Matter"	Sidney Marshall	August 3, 1954	June 15, 1954	Co-starring Hy Averback, Ed Begley, Lee Patrick and Hal March.
227	"The Sarah Martin Matter"	Sidney Marshall	August 10, 1954		Co-starring Jeanne Cagney, Mary Jane Croft, Virginia Gregg, John McIntire, Howard McNear, Lou Merrill and Jay Novello.
228	"The Hamilton Payroll Matter"	Sidney Marshall	September 5, 1954	July 24, 1954	Co-starring Jim Backus, Hans Conried, Mary Jane Croft, Don Diamond and Virginia Gregg.
229	"The Great Bassmock Race Matter"	Gibson Scott Fox	September 12, 1954	July 25, 1954	Co-starring Virginia Gregg, John McIntire, Howard McNear, Lou Merrill and Jay Novello.
230	"The Upjohn Matter"	E. Jack Neuman	September 19, 1954	March 4, 1954	Co-starring Joseph Kearns, John McIntire and Jay Novello.

=== 1955–1960: Gerald Mohr (audition) & Mr. Bob Bailey ===
Episode #	Title	Writer(s)	Original airdate	Recorded	Notes
Audition	"The Trans-Pacific Import-Export Matter"	E. Jack Newman and Gil Doud		August 29, 1955	Starred Gerald Mohr. Not broadcast.
231–235	"The Macormack Matter"	John Dawson	October 3–7, 1955	September 25, 1955	Also known as "The McCormack Matter". Co-starring Mary Jane Croft, Virginia Gregg, Marvin Miller, Forrest Lewis, Frank Gerstle, Herb Butterfield, Herb Ellis, Tony Barrett, Ken Christy, Jack Kruschen and Junius Matthews.
236–240	"The Molly K. Matter"	Les Crutchfield	October 10–14, 1955		Co-starring Virginia Gregg, Peter Leeds, Barney Phillips, Victor Perrin, James McCallion and Hy Averback.
241–245	"The Chesapeake Fraud Matter"	John Dawson	October 17–21, 1955	October 9, 1955	Co-starring Jeanne Bates, Dee J. Thompson, Hy Averback, Will Wright, John Dehner, Tony Barrett, Paul Dubov, Forrest Lewis.
246–250	"The Alvin Summers Matter"	Robert Ryf	October 24–28, 1955	October 10, 1955	Co-starring Virginia Gregg, Marvin Miller, Don Diamond, Tony Barrett and Parley Baer.
251–255	"The Valentine Matter"	John Dawson	October 31 – November 4, 1955	October 16, 1955	Co-starring Lillian Buyeff, Betty Lou Gerson, Barney Phillips, Will Wright, Forrest Lewis, Marvin Miller, Jay Novello and Jack Boyles.
256–260	"The Lorcoe Diamonds Matter"	Les Crutchfield	November 7–11, 1955	October 23, 1955	Co-starring Lillian Buyeff, Jack Boyles, Victor Perrin, Gerald Mohr (credited as CK Barrett), Larry Dobkin, Forrest Lewis and Jay Novello.
261–265	"The Broderick Matter"	John Dawson	November 14–18, 1955	October 30, 1955	Co-starring Eleanor Audley, Barbara Eiler, Virginia Gregg, Carleton Young, Harry Bartell, Herb Ellis, John Dehner, Marvin Miller, Tony Barrett, Frank Gerstle, Chester Stratton and Larry Dobkin. (This is one of several five-part Bob Bailey serial episodes which are expanded remakes of half-hour John Lund episodes. The original version was "The Thelma Ibsen Matter," aired on January 9, 1953, though this episode also borrowed key plot elements from "The Emily Braddock Matter." "John Dawson" is a pseudonym of the original author of both Lund episodes, E. Jack Neuman).
266–270	"The Amy Bradshaw Matter"	Robert Ryf	November 21–25, 1955	November 20, 1955	Co-starring Virginia Gregg, Florence Walcott, Don Diamond, Larry Thor, Vic Perrin and Carleton Young.
271–275	"The Henderson Matter"	John Dawson	November 28 – December 2, 1955	November 27, 1955	Co-starring Lillian Buyeff, Irene Tedrow, Dee J. Thompson, Herb Ellis, Marvin Miller, Forrest Lewis, Bob Bruce and Russell Thorson.
276–280	"The Cronin Matter"	Les Crutchfield	December 5–9, 1955	November 6, 1955	Co-starring Virginia Gregg, Shirley Mitchell, Vivi Janiss, Barbara Fuller, Benny Rubin, John Dehner and Parley Baer.
281–285	"The Lansing Fraud Matter"	John Dawson	December 12–16, 1955	November 13, 1955	Co-starring Mary Jane Croft, Vivi Janiss, Jeanne Tatum, Hy Averback, Barney Phillips, Russell Thorson and Howard McNear.
286–290	"The Nick Shurn Matter"	Les Crutchfield	December 19–23, 1955	December 5, 1955	Co-starring Virginia Gregg, Peggy Webber, Don Diamond, Ben Wright, Jack Kruschen, Barney Phillips, Sam Edwards and Ken Christy.
291–295	"The Forbes Matter"	John Dawson	December 26–30, 1955	December 4, 1955	Co-starring Lillian Buyeff, Sandra Gould, Jack Edwards, Herb Ellis, James McCallion, Parley Baer, John Stephenson, Howard McNear, Bob Bruce and Junius Matthews.
296–300	"The Caylin Matter"	Les Crutchfield	January 2–6, 1956	December 19, 1955	Co-starring Virginia Gregg, Lucille Meredith, Alma Lawton, Gloria Blondell, Howard McNear, Harry Bartell, Peter Leeds and Byron Kane.
301–305	"The Todd Matter"	John Dawson	January 9–13, 1956	December 11, 1955	Co-starring Vivi Janiss, Barbara Fuller, Shirley Mitchell, Larry Dobkin, Frank Gerstle and Marvin Miller.
306–310	"The Ricardo Amerigo Matter"	Jack Dawson; Sam Dawson	January 16–20, 1956	January 8, 1956	Co-starring Harry Bartell, Larry Dobkin, Victor Perrin, Barney Phillips, Forrest Lewis, Eric Snowden, Herb Vigran and James McCallion. The character in the episode title is a spoof of the show's music supervisor Amerigo Moreno.
311–315	"The Duke Red Matter"	John Dawson	January 23–27, 1956	January 15, 1956	Co-starring Barbara Fuller, Barbara Eiler, Herb Butterfield, John Stephenson, Parley Baer, Will Wright, Robert Bruce and Forrest Lewis.
316–320	"The Flight Six Matter"	Les Crutchfield	January 30 – February 3, 1956	January 22, 1956	Co-starring Virginia Gregg, Ben Wright, Edgar Barrier, Don Diamond, Russ Thorson and Jack Moyles.
321–325	"The McClain Matter"	John Dawson	February 6–10, 1956	January 23, 1956	Co-starring Lucille Meredith, Betty Lou Gerson, John Stephenson, Bob Bruce, Victor Perrin, Tony Barrett and Herb Ellis.
326–330	"The Cui Bono Matter"	Les Crutchfield	February 13–17, 1956	January 29, 1956	Co-starring Dee J. Thompson, Mary Jane Croft, Forrest Lewis, Byron Kane, Russell Thorson, Sam Edwards, Dallas McKennon and Howard McNear.
331–335	"The Bennett Matter"	John Dawson	February 20–24, 1956	February 5, 1956	Co-starring Lillian Buyeff, Stacy Harris, Chet Stratton, Will Wright, Marvin Miller, Hans Conried, Edgar Barrier and Parley Baer.
336–340	"The Fathom-Five Matter"	Les Crutchfield	February 27 – March 2, 1956	February 12, 1956	Co-starring Mary Jane Croft, Barney Phillips, Carleton Young, Eleanor Audley, Sam Edwards, Shepard Menken and John Dehner.
341–345	"The Plantagent Matter"	John Dawson	March 5–9, 1956	February 19, 1956	Co-starring Michael Ann Barrett, Jeanne Bates, Marvin Miller, Frank Gerstle, Larry Dobkin, Jack Kruschen, Ken Peters and Herb Butterfield.
346–350	"The Clinton Matter"	John Dawson	March 12–16, 1956	February 16, 1956	Co-starring Jeannette Nolan, Lucille Meredith, Carleton Young, Herb Ellis, Jack Petruzzi, Bob Bruce, Herb Butterfield, Paul Richards, Edgar Barrier, Russell Thorson, Jack Boyles and Frank Gerstle.
351–355	"The Jolly Roger Fraud Matter"	Jack Johnstone	March 19–23, 1956	March 4, 1956	Co-starring Virginia Gregg, Forrest Lewis, Paul Frees, Jay Novello, Harry Bartell, Don Diamond and Victor Perrin.
356–360	"The Lamarr Matter"	Jack Johnstone	March 26–30, 1956	March 11, 1956	Co-starring Virginia Gregg, Larry Dobkin, Harry Bartell, Eric Snowden, Howard McNear, John Dehner, Jeanne Tatum, Joseph Kearns, Paul Richards and Jack Boyles.
361–365	"The Salt City Matter"	Jack Johnstone	April 2–6, 1956	March 18, 1956	Co-starring Larry Dobkin, Jack Edwards, Junius Matthews and Barney Phillips.
366–370	"The Laird Douglas Douglas of Heatherscote Matter"	Jack Johnstone	April 9–13, 1956	March 25, 1956	Co-starring Jeanette Nolan, Harry Bartell, Byron Kane, Jack Kruschen, Bill James, James McCallion, Ken Christy, Dick Ryan, Bert Holland, Jack Edwards and Hy Averback.
371–375	"The Shepherd Matter"	John Dawson	April 16–20, 1956		Co-starring Jeanne Bates, Virginia Gregg, Russell Thorson, Parley Baer, Herb Ellis, Barney Phillips, and Lawrence Dobkin. (This exact storyline, with a different lead-in premise and different character names, was originally used in a half hour John Lund episode, "The James Clayton Matter", broadcast December 5, 1952. "John Dawson" was a pen name of the original story's writer, E. Jack Neuman.)
376–380	"The Lonely Hearts Matter"	Les Crutchfield	April 23–27, 1956		Episode 4 is missing - Co-starring Lucille Meredith, Mary Jane Croft, Virginia Gregg, Herb Ellis, Howard McNear and Stacy Harris
381–385	"The Callicles Matter"	John Dawson	April 30 – May 4, 1956		Co-starring Virginia Gregg, Harry Bartell, Lillian Buyeff, Will Wright, Jeanne Bates, Carlton Young, Larry Dobkin, Bert Holland, Marvin Miller and Herb Vigran. (This exact same plot, with different names and a different lead-in, but including the Callicles quote, was previously used in a half-hour John Lund episode, “The Brisbane Fraud Matter,” which aired on May 26, 1953. The name “John Dawson” was a pseudonym of E. Jack Neuman, the author of the earlier episode).
386–390	"The Silver Blue Matter"	Les Crutchfield	May 7–11, 1956		Co-starring Lucille Meredith, Edgar Barrier, Victor Perrin, Jack Kruschen, Tommy Cook and Richard Crenna
391–395	"The Matter of The Medium, Well Done"	Jack Johnstone	May 14–18, 1956		Co-starring Virginia Gregg, Larry Dobkin, Lurene Tuttle, Harry Bartell, Eleanor Audley, Joseph Kearns, Herb Vigran, Junius Matthews, Tony Barrett and Sam Edwards
396–400	"The Tears of The Night Matter"	John Dawson	May 21–25, 1956		Co-starring Virginia Gregg, Victor Perrin, Jack Kruschen, Jay Novello, William Conrad, Frank Gerstle, Marvin Miller and Will Wright
401–405	"The Matter of Reasonable Doubt"	Les Crutchfield	28 May – June 1, 1956		Co-starring Susan Whitney, Richard Crenna, Jeannette Nolan, Forrest Lewis, Inga Adams, Paul Richards and Jeanne Tatum
406–410	"The Indestructible Mike Matter"	Jack Johnstone	June 4–8, 1956		Co-starring Howard McNear, Larry Dobkin, Harry Bartell, Herb Vigran, Alan Reed and Roy Glenn
411–415	"The Laughing Matter"	Les Crutchfield	June 11–15, 1956		Co-starring Virginia Gregg, John Dehner, Lucille Meredith, Larry Dobkin, Gil Stratton, Harry Bartell and Don Diamond
416–420	"The Pearling Matter"	John Dawson	June 18–22, 1956		Co-starring Mary Jane Croft, Forrest Lewis, Jeannette Nolan, Russ Thorson, Michael Ann Barrett, Jack Petruzzi, Barbara Fuller, Herb Ellis and Marvin Miller
421–425	"The Long Shot Matter"	Tony Barrett	June 25–29, 1956		Co-starring Virginia Gregg, Victor Perrin, Lillian Buyeff, Russel Thorson, James McCallion, Edgar Barrier, Don Diamond, Herb Butterfield
426–430	"The Midas Touch Matter"	Jack Johnstone	July 2–6, 1956		Co-starring Virginia Gregg, Johnny Jacobs, Herb Butterfield, Parley Baer, Barney Phillips, Shepard Menken, Roland Winters
431–435	"The Shady Lane Matter"	Les Crutchfield	July 9–13, 1956		Co-starring Jeannette Nolan, Forrest Lewis, Shirley Mitchell, Will Wright, Bert Holland, John Dehner
436–440	"The Star of Capetown Matter"		July 16–20, 1956		
441–445	"The Open Town Matter"		July 23–27, 1956		Co-starring Jeanne Tatum and Stacy Harris
446–450	"The Sea Legs Matter"		July 30 – August 3, 1956		Co-starring Harry Bartell, Larry Dobkin, Virginia Gregg, Parley Baer, Don Diamond and Russel Thorsen
451–455	"The Alder Matter"		August 6–10, 1956		
456–460	"The Crystal Lake Matter"		August 13–17, 1956		
461–466	"The Kranesburg Matter"		August 24–31, 1956		This was a six-part episode.
467–471	"The Curse of Kamashek Matter"		September 3–7, 1956		Ties-in the supposed curse of Tutankhamun
472–476	"The Confidential Matter"		September 10–14, 1956		
477–481	"The Imperfect Alibi Matter"		September 17–21, 1956		
482–486	"The Meg's Palace Matter"	Jack Johnstone	September 24–28, 1956		
487–491	"The Picture Postcard Matter"	Robert Ryf	October 1–5, 1956		
492–496	"The Primrose Matter"	Les Crutchfield	October 8–12, 1956		Co-starring Marvin Miller, Junius Matthews, Herb Ellis, Dee J. Thompson, Herb Butterfield, Tony Barrett and Barbara Eiler
497–505	"The Phantom Chase Matter"	Robert Ryf	October 15–26, 1956		This was a nine-part episode. Co-starring Michael Ann Barrett, Jack Edwards, Ben Wright, Virginia Gregg, Don Diamond, Forrest Lewis and Richard Crenna.
506–510	"The Silent Queen Matter"	Adrian Gendot	October 29 – November 2, 1956		This was the final serialized story. Co-starring Paula Winslowe, Virginia Gregg, Victor Perrin, Paul Dubov, Frank Gerstle, John Dehner, Larry Dobkin and Chester Stratton.
511	"The Big Scoop Matter"	Robert Ryf	November 11, 1956		Co-starring Virginia Gregg, Russell Thorson, Barney Phillips, Stacy Harris, Larry Thor, Parley Baer and Les Tremayne.
512	"The Markham Matter"		November 18, 1956		
513	"The Royal Street Matter"	Charles B. Smith	November 25, 1956		Co-starring Virginia Gregg, Forrest Lewis, Lou Merrill, Lawrence Dobkin and Frank Gerstle.
514	"The Burning Carr Matter"	Jack Johnstone	December 9, 1956		Co-starring Virginia Gregg, Parley Baer, Victor Perrin, Bob Bruce, Harry Bartell, Vivi Janiss, Tony Barrett and Junius Matthews.
515	"The Rasmusson Matter"	John Dawson	December 16, 1956		Co-starring Virginia Gregg, Jeanne Tatum, Eric Snowden, Roy Glenn, Will Wright, Frank Nelson and Jack Kruschen
516	"The Missing Mouse Matter"	Charles B. Smith	December 23, 1956		
517	"The Squared Circle Matter"	Jack Johnstone	December 30, 1956		Co-starring Harry Bartell, Herb Ellis, Victor Perrin, Jack Kruschen, Les Tremayne and Lawrence Dobkin.
518	"The Ellen Dear Matter"	Jack Johnstone	January 6, 1957		Co-starring Virginia Gregg, Lawrence Dobkin, Howard McNear, Jay Novello, Jack Edwards, Barney Phillips and Raymond Burr.
519	"The Desalles Matter"	John Dawson	January 13, 1957		Co starring Virginia Gregg, Harry Bartell, John Stephenson, Will Wright, James McCallion and Ben Wright.
520	"The Blooming Blossom Matter"	Jack Johnstone	January 20, 1957		Co starring Howard McNear, Herb Ellis, Herb Vigran, Junius Matthews, Herb Butterfield, Frank Gerstle and Johnny Jacobs.
521	"The Mad Hatter Matter"		January 27, 1957		
522	"The Kirby Will Matter"		February 3, 1957		This is a sequel to The Midas Touch Matter.
523	"The Templeton Matter"		February 10, 1957		
524	"The Golden Touch Matter"		February 17, 1957		
525	"The Meek Memorial Matter"		March 3, 1957		
526	"The Suntan Oil Matter"	Paul Franklin	March 10, 1957		Co starring Barbara Eiler, Paula Winslowe, Forrest Lewis, Frank Nelson, Sam Edwards, Austin Green and Shep Menken.
527	"The Clever Chemist Matter"		March 17, 1957		
528	"The Hollywood Matter"		March 24, 1957		
529	"The Moonshine Murder Matter"		March 31, 1957		
530	"The Ming Toy Murphy Matter"		April 14, 1957		
531	"The Marley K. Matter"		April 21, 1957		
532	"The Melancholy Memory Matter"		April 28, 1957		
533	"The Peerless Fire Matter"		May 5, 1957		
534	"The Glacier Ghost Matter"		May 12, 1957		
535	"The Michael Meany Mirage Matter"		May 19, 1957		
536	"The Wayward Truck Matter"		May 26, 1957		
537	"The Loss Of Memory Matter"		June 2, 1957		
538	"The Mason-dixon Mismatch Matter"		June 9, 1957		
539	"The Dixon Murder Matter"		June 16, 1957		
540	"The Parley Baron Matter"		June 23, 1957		
541	"The Funny Money Matter"	Jack Johnstone	June 30, 1957		Co-Starring Virginia Gregg, G. Stanley Jones, and John McIntire
542	"The Felicity Feline Matter"		July 7, 1957		
543	"The Heatherstone Players Matter"		July 14, 1957		
544	"The Yours Truly Matter"		July 21, 1957		
545	"The Confederate Coinage Matter"		July 28, 1957		
546	"The Wayward Widow Matter"		August 4, 1957		
547	"The Killer's Brand Matter"		August 11, 1957		
548	"The Winnipesaukee Wonder Matter"		August 18, 1957		
549	"The Smokey Sleeper Matter"		August 25, 1957		
550	"The Poor Little Rich Girl Matter"		September 1, 1957		
551	"The Charmona Matter"		September 8, 1957		
552	"The J.P.D. Matter"		September 15, 1957		
553	"The Ideal Vacation Matter"		September 22, 1957		
554	"The Doubtful Diary Matter"		September 29, 1957		
555	"The Bum Steer Matter"		October 6, 1957		
556	"The Silver Belle Matter"		October 13, 1957		
557	"The Mary Grace Matter"		October 20, 1957		
558	"The Three Sisters Matter"		October 27, 1957		
559	"The Model Picture Matter"		November 3, 1957		
560	"The Alkali Mike Matter"		November 10, 1957		
561	"The Shy Beneficiary Matter"		November 17, 1957		
562	"The Hope To Die Matter"		November 24, 1957		
563	"The Sunny Dream Matter"		December 1, 1957		
564	"The Hapless Hunter Matter"		December 8, 1957		
565	"The Happy Family Matter"		December 15, 1957		
566	"The Carmen Kringle Matter"	Robert Bainter	December 22, 1957		The show was written by Bob Bailey but he used the pen name "Robert Bainter", which are his first and middle names.
567	"The Latin Lovely Matter"		December 29, 1957		
568	"The Ingenuous Jeweler Matter"		January 5, 1958		
569	"The Boron 112 Matter"		January 12, 1958		
570	"The Eleven O'clock Matter"	Robert Ryf	January 19, 1958	December 27, 1957	Co-starring Larry Dobkin, Eleanor Audley, Ben Wright and Will Wright.
571	"The Fire In Paradise Matter"	Jack Johnstone	January 26, 1958	January 17, 1958	Co-starring Parley Baer, Forrest Lewis, Virginia Gregg, Vic Perrin and Will Wright.
572	"The Price Of Fame Matter"	Jack Johnstone	February 2, 1958	January 21, 1958	Co-starring Virginia Gregg, Forrest Lewis, Junius Matthews, Howard McNear and Vincent Price. The story is about Price and Dollar teaming up to retrieve a painting stolen by Price's insurance agent.
573	"The Sick Chick Matter"	Jack Johnstone	February 9, 1958	January 31, 1958	Co-starring Sam Edwards and Howard McNear.
574	"The Time And Tide Matter"	Robert Ryf	February 16, 1958	February 7, 1958	Co-starring Larry Dobkin, Virginia Gregg, Frank Nelson and Ben Wright.
575	"The Durango Laramie Matter"	Jack Johnstone	February 23, 1958	February 14, 1958	Co-starring Virginia Gregg, Junius Matthews, Frank Nelson and Alan Reed.
576	"The Diamond Dilemma Matter"	Allen Botzer	March 2, 1958	February 22, 1958	Co-starring Paul Dubov and Junius Matthews.
577	"The Wayward Moth Matter"	Jack Johnstone	March 9, 1958	February 28, 1958	Co-starring Lou Merrill, Vic Perrin and Paul Richards.
578	"The Salkoff Sequel Matter"	Jack Johnstone	March 16, 1958	March 7, 1958	Co-starring Jack Kruschen, Lou Merrill, Stacy Harris, Harry Bartell, and Vic Perrin.
579	"The Denver Dispursal Matter"	Jack Johnstone	March 23, 1958	March 14, 2008	Co-starring Virginia Gregg and Forrest Lewis.
580	"The Killer's List Matter"	Robert Ryf	March 30, 1958	March 21, 1958	Co Starring Parley Baer, Virginia Gregg and Carleton G. Young
581	"The Eastern-Western Matter"	Jack Johnstone	April 6, 1958	March 28, 1958	Co-starring Virginia Gregg, Marvin Miller and Vic Perrin.
582	"The Wayward Money Matter"	Jack Johnstone	April 13, 1958	April 4, 1958	Co-starring Virginia Gregg, Frank Nelson, Vic Perrin and Alan Reed.
583	"The Wayward Trout Matter"	Jack Johnstone	April 20, 1958	April 11, 1958	Co-starring Eleanor Audley, Larry Dobkin, Junius Matthews, Barney Phillips and Alan Reed.
584	"The Village Of Virtue Matter"	Jack Johnstone	April 27, 1958	April 18, 1958	Co-starring Jack Kruschen, Frank Nelson and Will Wright.
585	"The Carson Arson Matter"	Jack Johnstone	May 4, 1958	April 25, 1958	Co-starring Harry Bartell, Virginia Gregg, Joseph Kearns and Forrest Lewis.
586	"The Rolling Stone Matter"	Robert Stanley	May 11, 1958	May 2, 1958	Co-starring Don Diamond, Larry Dobkin, Virginia Gregg and Forrest Lewis.
587	"The Ghost To Ghost Matter"	Jack Johnstone	May 18, 1958	May 9, 1958	Co-starring Sam Edwards, Virginia Gregg, Joseph Kearns and Forrest Lewis.
588	"The Midnight Sun Matter"		May 25, 1958		
589	"The Froward Fisherman Matter"		June 1, 1958		
590	"The Wayward River Matter"		June 8, 1958		
591	"The Delectable Damsel Matter"		June 15, 1958		
592	"The Virtuous Mobster Matter"		June 22, 1958		
593	"The Ugly Pattern Matter"		June 29, 1958		
594	"The Blinker Matter"		July 6, 1958		
595	"The Mojave Red Matter Part 1"		July 13, 1958		
596	"The Mojave Red Matter Part 2"		July 20, 1958		
597	"The Wayward Killer Matter"		July 27, 1958		
598	"The Lucky Four Matter"		August 3, 1958		
599	"The Two-faced Matter"		August 10, 1958		
600	"The Noxious Needle Matter"		August 24, 1958		
601	"The Limping Liability Matter"		August 31, 1958		
602	"The Malibu Mystery Matter"		September 7, 1958		
603	"The Wayward Diamonds Matter"		September 14, 1958		
604	"The Johnson Payroll Matter"		September 21, 1958		
605	"The Gruesome Spectacle Matter"		September 28, 1958		
606	"The Missing Matter Matter"		October 5, 1958		
607	"The Impossible Murder Matter"		October 12, 1958		
608	"The Monoxide Mystery Matter"		October 19, 1958		
609	"The Basking Ridge Matter"		October 26, 1958		
610	"The Crater Lake Matter"		November 2, 1958		
611	"The Close Shave Matte"		November 9, 1958		
612	"The Double Trouble Matter"		November 16, 1958		
613	"The One Most Wanted Matter"		November 23, 1958		
614	"The Hair Raising Matter"		November 30, 1958		
615	"The Allanmee Matter"		December 14, 1958		
616	"The Perilous Parley Matter"		December 21, 1958		
617	"The Telltale Tracks Matter"		December 28, 1958		
618	"The Hollywood Mystery Matter"		January 4, 1959		
619	"The Deadly Doubt Matter"		January 11, 1959		
620	"The Love Shorn Matter"		January 18, 1959		
621	"The Doting Dowager Matter"		January 25, 1959		
622	"The Curley Waters Matter"		February 1, 1959		
623	"The Date With Death Matter"		February 8, 1959		
624	"The Shankar Diamond Matter"		February 15, 1959		
625	"The Blue Madonna Matter"		February 22, 1959		
626	"The Clouded Crystal Matter"		March 1, 1959		
627	"The Net Of Circumstance Matter"		March 8, 1959		
628	"The Baldero Matter"		March 15, 1959		
629	"The Lake Mead Mystery Matter"		March 22, 1959		
630	"The Jimmy Carter Matter"		March 29, 1959		Co-starring Virginia Gregg, Dick Beals, Larry Dobkin, Forrest Lewis, Edgar Barrier, and Jack Kruschen
631	"The Frisco Fire Matter"		April 5, 1959		
632	"The Fair Weather Friend Matter"		April 12, 1959		
633	"The Cautious Celibate Matter"		April 19, 1959		
634	"The Winsome Widow Matter"		April 26, 1959		
635	"The Negligent Nephew Matter"		May 3, 1959		
636	"The Fatal Filet Matter"		May 10, 1959		
637	"The Twin Trouble Matter"		May 17, 1959		
638	"The Cask Of Death Matter"		May 24, 1959		
639	"The Big H Matter"		May 31, 1959		
640	"The Wayward Heiress Matter"		June 7, 1959		
641	"The Wayward Sculptor Matter"		June 14, 1959		
642	"The Life At Stake Matter"		June 21, 1959		
643	"The Mei-ling Buddha Matter"		June 28, 1959		
644	"The Only One Butt Matter"		July 5, 1959		
645	"The Frantic Fisherman Matter"		July 12, 1959		
646	"The Will And A Way Matter"		July 19, 1959		
647	"The Bolt Out Of The Blue Matter"		July 26, 1959		
648	"The Deadly Chain Matter"		August 2, 1959		
649	"The Lost By A Hair Matter"		August 9, 1959		
650	"The Night In Paris Matter"		August 16, 1959		
651	"The Embarcadero Matter"		August 23, 1959		
652	"The Really Gone Matter"		August 30, 1959		
653	"The Backfire That Backfired Matter"		September 6, 1959		
654	"The Leumas Matter"		September 13, 1959		
655	"The Little Man Who Was There Matter"		September 20, 1959		
656	"The Gruesome Spectacle Matter"		September 27, 1959		Repeat of the September 28, 1958 episode.
657	"The Buffalo Matter"		October 4, 1959		
658	"The Further Buffalo Matter"		October 11, 1959		
659	"The Double Identity Matter"		October 18, 1959		
660	"The Missing Missile Matter"		October 25, 1959		
661	"The Hand Of Providential Matter"		November 1, 1959		
662	"The Larson Arson Matter"		November 8, 1959		
663	"The Bayou Body Matter"		November 15, 1959		
664	"The Fancy Bridgework Matter"		November 22, 1959		
665	"The Wrong Man Matter"		November 29, 1959		
666	"The Hired Homicide Matter"		December 6, 1959		
667	"The Sudden Wealth Matter"		December 13, 1959		
668	"The Red Mystery Matter"		December 20, 1959		
669	"The Burning Desire Matter"		December 27, 1959		
670	"The Hapless Ham Matter"		January 3, 1960		
671	"The Unholy Two Matter"		January 10, 1960		
672	"The Evaporated Clue Matter"	Jack Johnstone	January 17, 1960	January 10, 1960	Co-starring Herb Vigran.
673	"The Nuclear Goof Matter"	Jack Johnstone	January 24, 1960	January 17, 1960	Co-starring Sam Edwards and Virginia Gregg.
674	"The Merry Go Round Matter"	Jack Johnstone	January 31, 1960	January 24, 1960	Co-starring Larry Dobkin, Joseph Kearns and Will Wright.
675	"The Sidewinder Matter"	Jack Johnstone	February 7, 1960	January 31, 1960	Co-starring Sam Edwards, Virginia Gregg, Joseph Kearns and Ralph Moody.
676	"The P. O. Matter"	Jack Johnstone	February 14, 1960	February 7, 1960	Co-starring Virginia Gregg and Herb Vigran.
677	"The Alvin's Alfred Matter"	Jack Johnstone	February 21, 1960	February 14, 1960	Co-starring Virginia Gregg.
678	"The Look Before The Leap Matter"	Jack Johnstone	February 28, 1960	February 21, 1960	Co-starring Larry Dobkin, Virginia Gregg, Forrest Lewis and Herb Vigran.
679	"The Moonshine Matter"	Jack Johnstone	March 6, 1960	February 28, 1960	
680	"The Deep Down Matter"	Jack Johnstone	March 13, 1960	March 6, 1960	Co-starring Virginia Gregg and Will Wright.
681	"The Saturday Night Matter"	Jack Johnstone	March 20, 1960	March 13, 1960	Co-starring Forrest Lewis.
682	"The False Alarm Matter"	Jack Johnstone	March 27, 1960	March 20, 1960	Co-starring Virginia Gregg.
683	"The Double Exposure Matter"	Jack Johnstone	April 3, 1960	March 27, 1960	Co-starring Virginia Gregg and Ralph Moody.
684	"The Deadly Swamp Matter"	Jack Johnstone	April 17, 1960	April 3, 1960	Co-starring Sam Edwards and Vic Perrin.
685	"The Silver Queen Matter"	Jack Johnstone	April 24, 1960	April 10, 1960	Co-starring Virginia Gregg and Ralph Moody.
686	"The Fatal Switch Matter"	Jack Johnstone	May 1, 1960	April 24, 1960	Co-starring Sam Edwards, Virginia Gregg and Will Wright.
687	"The Phony Phone Matter"	Jack Johnstone	May 8, 1960	May 1, 1960	Co-starring Virginia Gregg.
688	"The Mystery Gal Matter"	Jack Johnstone	May 15, 1960	May 8, 1960	Co-starring Virginia Gregg.
689	"The Man Who Waits Matter"	Jack Johnstone	May 22, 1960	May 8, 1960	Co-starring Virginia Gregg, Forrest Lewis, Barney Phillips and Herb Vigran.
690	"The Redrock Matter"	Jack Johnstone	May 29, 1960	May 22, 1960	Co-starring Parley Baer, Virginia Gregg, Vic Perrin, Herb Vigran and Will Wright.
691	"The Canned Canary Matter"	Jack Johnstone	June 5, 1960	May 29, 1960	Co-starring Virginia Gregg and Forrest Lewis.
692	"The Harried Heiress Matter"	Jack Johnstone	June 12, 1960	June 5, 1960	Co-starring Sam Edwards, Virginia Gregg, Forrest Lewis and Marvin Miller.
693	"The Flask Of Death Matter"	Jack Johnstone	June 19, 1960	June 12, 1960	Co-starring Parley Baer and Forrest Lewis.
694	"The Wholly Unexpected Matter"	Jack Johnstone	June 26, 1960	June 19, 1960	Co-starring Sam Edwards, Larry Dobkin and Virginia Gregg.
695	"The Collector's Matter"	Jack Johnstone	July 3, 1960	June 26, 1960	Co-starring Larry Dobkin, Virginia Gregg and Vic Perrin.
696	"The Back To The Back Matter"	Jack Johnstone	July 17, 1960	June 26, 1960	Co-starring Virginia Gregg, Forrest Lewis and Herb Vigran.
697	"The Rhymer Collection Matter"	Jack Johnstone	July 31, 1960	October 25, 1959	Co-starring Forrest Lewis and Marvin Miller.
698	"The Magnanimous Matter"	Jack Johnstone	August 7, 1960	November 1, 1959	Co-starring Larry Dobkin, Virginia Gregg, Howard McNear and Vic Perrin.
699	"The Paradise Lost Matter"	Jack Johnstone	August 14, 1960	August 7, 1960	Co-starring Sam Edwards, Virginia Gregg and Forrest Lewis.
700	"The Twisted Twin Matter"	Jack Johnstone	August 21, 1960	August 14, 1960	Co-starring Sam Edwards, Virginia Gregg, G. Stanley Jones and Forrest Lewis.
701	"The Deadly Debt Matter"	Jack Johnstone	August 28, 1960	August 21, 1960	Co-starring Sam Edwards and Virginia Gregg.
702	"The Killer Kin Matter"	Jack Johnstone	September 4, 1960	August 28, 1960	Co-starring Sam Edwards, Virginia Gregg, G. Stanley Jones and Herb Vigran.
703	"The Too Much Money Matter"	Jack Johnstone	September 11, 1960	September 4, 1960	Co-starring Sam Edwards, G. Stanley Jones and Howard McNear.
704	"The Real Smokey Matter"	Jack Johnstone	September 18, 1960	September 11, 1960	Co-starring Vic Perrin.
705	"The Five Down Matter"	Jack Johnstone	September 25, 1960	September 18, 1960	Fifth anniversary show for Bob Bailey. Co-starring Larry Dobkin, Forrest Lewis, Marvin Miller, Howard McNear, Vic Perrin and Herb Vigran
706	"The Stope of Death Matter"	Jack Johnstone	October 2, 1960	September 25, 1960	Co-starring Forrest Lewis.
707	"The Recompense Matter"	Jack Johnstone	October 9, 1960	October 2, 1960	Co-starring Parley Baer and Herb Vigran.
708	"The Twins of Tahoe Matter"	Jack Johnstone	October 16, 1960	October 9, 1960	Co-starring Sam Edwards, Virginia Gregg and Forrest Lewis.
709	"The Unworthy Kin Matter"	Jack Johnstone	October 23, 1960	October 16, 1960	Co-starring Virginia Gregg.
710	"The What Goes Matter"	Jack Johnstone	October 30, 1960	October 23, 1960	Co-starring Virginia Gregg, Forrest Lewis and Vic Perrin.
711	"The Super Salesman Matter"	Jack Johnstone	November 6, 1960	October 30, 1960	Co-starring Larry Dobkin and Virginia Gregg.
712	"The Bad One Matter		November 13, 1960		
713	"The Double Deal Matter"	Jack Johnstone	November 20, 1960	July 31, 1960	Co-starring Virginia Gregg.
714	"The Empty Threat Matter"		November 27, 1960		

=== 1960–1962: Bob Readick & Mandel Kramer ===
Episode #	Title	Writer(s)	Original airdate	Recorded	Notes
715	"The Earned Income Matter"		December 4, 1960		
716	"The Locked Room Murder Matter"		December 11, 1960		
717	"The Wayward Kilocycles Matter"		December 18, 1960		
718	"The Christmas Present Matter"		December 25, 1960		Also known as "The Firebug Matter".
719	"The Missing Jewels Matter"		January 1, 1961		
720	"The Paperback Mystery Matter"		January 8, 1961		
721	"The Very Fishy Matter"		January 15, 1961		
722	"The Dollar Put In Jail Matter"		January 22, 1961		
723	"The Short Term Matter"		January 29, 1961		
724	"The Who's Who Matter"		February 5, 1961		
725	"The Wayward Fireman Matter"		February 12, 1961		
726	"The Too Tired Matter"		February 19, 1961		
727	"The Touch-Up Matter"		February 26, 1961		
728	"The Morning After Matter"		March 5, 1961		
729	"The Ring Of Death Matter"		March 12, 1961		
730	"The Informer Matter"		March 19, 1961		
731	"The Two's A Crowd Matter"		March 26, 1961		
732	"The Wrong Sign Matter"		April 2, 1961		
733	"The Captain's Table Matter"		April 9, 1961		
734	"The Latro Dectus Matter"		April 16, 1961		
735	"The Rat Pack Matter"		April 23, 1961		
736	"The Purple Doll Matter"		April 30, 1961		
737	"The Newark Stockbroker Matter"		May 7, 1961		
738	"The Simple Simon Matter"		May 14, 1961		
739	"The Lone Wolf Matter"		May 21, 1961		
740	"The Yak Mystery Matter"		May 28, 1961		
741	"The Stock-In-Trade Matter"		June 4, 1961		
742	"The Big Date Matter"		June 11, 1961		
743	"The Low Tide Matter"		June 18, 1961		
744	"The Imperfect Crime Matter"		June 25, 1961		
745	"The Well Of Trouble Matter"		July 2, 1961		
746	"The Fiddle Faddle Matter"		July 9, 1961		
747	"The Old Fashioned Murder Matter"		July 16, 1961		
748	"The Chuck-A-Nut Matter"		July 23, 1961		
749	"The Philadelphia Miss Matter"		July 30, 1961		
750	"The Perilous Padre Marrer"		August 6, 1961		
751	"The Wrong Doctor Matter"		August 13, 1961		
752	"The Too Many Crooks Matter"		August 20, 1961		
753	"The Shifty Looker Matter"		August 27, 1961		
754	"The All Wet Matter"		September 3, 1961		
755	"The Buyer and the Cellar Matter"		September 10, 1961		
756	"The Clever Crook Matter"		September 17, 1961		
757	"The Double-Barreled Matter"		September 17, 1961		
758	"One of the Rottenest Rackets Matter"		October 1, 1961		
759	"The Medium Rare Matter"		October 8, 1961		
760	"The Quiet Little Town in New Jersey Matter"		October 15, 1961		
761	"The Three for One Matter"		October 22, 1961		
762	"The To Bee or Not To Bee Matter"		October 29, 1961		
763	"The Monticello Mystery Matter"		November 5, 1961		
764	"The Wrong One Matter"		November 12, 1961		
765	"The Guide to Murder Matter"		November 19, 1961		
766	"The Mad Bomber Matter"		November 26, 1961		
767	"The Cinder Elmer Matter"		December 3, 1961		
768	"The Firebug Matter"		December 10, 1961		
769	"The Phony Phone Matter"		December 17, 1961		
770	"The One Too Many Matter"		December 31, 1961		
771	"The Hot Chocolate Matter"		January 7, 1962		
772	"The Gold Rush Country Matter"		January 14, 1962		
773	"The Terrible Torch Matter"		January 21, 1962		
774	"The Can't Be So Matter"		January 28, 1962		
775	"The Nugget Of Truth Matter"		February 4, 1962		
776	"The Do It Yourself Matter"		February 11, 1962		
777	"The It Takes a Crook Matter"		February 18, 1962		
778	"The Mixed Blessing Matter"		February 25, 1962		
779	"The Top Secret Matter"		March 4, 1962		
780	"The Golden Dream Matter"		March 11, 1962		
781	"The Ike and Mike Matter"		March 18, 1962		
782	"The Shadow of a Doubt Matter"		March 25, 1962		
783	"The Blue Rock Matter"		April 1, 1962		
784	"The Ivy Emerald Matter"		April 8, 1962		
785	"The Wrong Idea Matter"		April 15, 1962		
786	"The Skidmore Matter"		April 22, 1962		
787	"The Grand Canyon Matter"		April 29, 1962		
788	"The Burma Red Matter"		May 6, 1962		
789	"The Lust for Gold Matter"		May 13, 1962		
790	"The Two Steps to Murder Matter"		May 20, 1962		
791	"The Zipp Matter"		May 27, 1962		
792	"The Wayward Gun Matter"		June 3, 1962		
793	"The Tuna Clipper Matter"		June 10, 1962		
794	"The All Too Easy Matter"		June 17, 1962		
795	"The Hood of Death Matter"		June 24, 1962		
796	"The Vociferous Dolphin Matter"		July 1, 1962		
797	"The Rilldoe Matter"		July 8, 1962		
798	"The Weather or Not Matter"		July 15, 1962		
799	"The Skimpy Matter"		July 22, 1962		
800	"The Four is a Crowd Matter"		July 29, 1962		
801	"The Case of Trouble Matter"		August 5, 1962		
802	"The Oldest Gag Matter"		August 12, 1962		
803	"The Lorelei Matter"		August 19, 1962		
804	"The Gold Rush Matter"		August 26, 1962		
805	"The Donninger Donninger Matter"		September 2, 1962		
806	"The Four Seas Matter"		September 9, 1962		
807	"The No Matter Matter"		September 16, 1962		
808	"The Deadly Crystal Matter"		September 23, 1962		
809	"The Tip-Off Matter"		September 30, 1962		
