= Empty Threat (disambiguation) =

"Empty Threat" is a song on the album Every Open Eye by Chvrches.

Empty Threat may also refer to:

- "Empty Threat", song on 2012 album Voyageur (Kathleen Edwards album)
- "An Empty Threat", poem by Robert Frost in New Hampshire (collection)
- "The Empty Threat Matter", episode of the radio drama Yours Truly, Johnny Dollar
- "An × Empty × Threat", episode of the anime television series Hunter × Hunter
