= The Canterville Ghost (1944 film) =

1944 film by Norman Z. McLeod, Jules Dassin

- Directed by: Jules Dassin; Norman Z. McLeod (uncredited)
- Screenplay by: Edwin Blum
- Based on: "The Canterville Ghost"; 1887 short story by Oscar Wilde
- Produced by: Arthur Field
- Starring: Charles Laughton; Robert Young; Margaret O'Brien
- Cinematography: Robert Planck; William H. Daniels (uncredited)
- Edited by: Chester Schaeffer
- Music by: George Bassman
- Production company: Metro-Goldwyn-Mayer
- Distributed by: Loew's Inc.
- Release date: July 28, 1944 (New York City)
- Running time: 95 minutes
- Country: United States
- Language: English

The Canterville Ghost is a 1944 fantasy/comedy film directed by Jules Dassin, loosely based on the 1887 short story of the same title by Oscar Wilde. It starred Charles Laughton as a ghost doomed to haunt an English castle, and Robert Young as his distant American relative called upon to perform an act of bravery to redeem him.

It was remade as a TV movie of the same title in 1986 and again in 1996.

== Plot ==
In the seventeenth century, Sir Simon de Canterville is forced by the Code of Chivalry to engage in a duel on behalf of his brother, but flees to the family castle when his opponent engages a substitute—a giant, the Bold Sir Guy. His proud father, Lord Canterville, refuses to acknowledge that his son has disgraced the family name, even when shown in front of witnesses where Simon is cowering. The father has the only entrance to his son's hiding place bricked over as proof that Simon is not there, ignoring Simon's pleas for mercy. Lord Canterville then curses his doomed cowardly son to find no rest until "a kinsman shall perform an act of bravery" in his name, wearing his signet ring.

Next, during World War II, US Army Rangers are billeted in the castle, owned now by six-year-old Lady Jessica de Canterville. One of the men is Cuffy Williams. The Rangers encounter Sir Simon but rather than being terrorized, they humiliate the ghost with a mock haunting. With Cuffy's help, Jessica overcomes her own terror of the ghost. Jessica discovers that Cuffy is a Canterville by a distinctive birthmark on his neck. He is a descendant of Sir Simon’s brother. Together, the two meet Sir Simon and learn the fate of their ghostly ancestor. One night, Simon takes Cuffy on a tour of the family portrait gallery, recounting the cowardly act of each descendant. Cuffy scoffs at Simon's misgivings and boasts that he is different.

However, when the moment of crisis comes, Cuffy seems to be a true Canterville and is paralyzed by fear in combat. On a mission in Europe, he and another soldier are stationed with a machine gun to ambush a large group of Nazi soldiers on motorcycles. Sir Simon appears with the signet ring, which Cuffy had left behind, and his attempts to encourage Cuffy make the young man even more apprehensive. The Nazi convoy appears on the road. His buddy fires and Cuffy feeds the ammunition belt. All seems well until his partner is shot by a sniper. Cuffy moves to take his place, with his friend’s blood on his hand and bullets pinging around him. He freezes, staring, unable to pull the trigger. Another soldier knocks him aside and takes over.

Back in England, Cuffy reports himself. Disgraced and leaving the Rangers for his old outfit, Cuffy is left alone at the castle while the others go out on maneuvers on the huge estate. He is given another chance when Lady Jessica runs to tell him that she saw a parachute land in the woods. She shows him how to drive there. It is an unexploded parachute mine, a blockbuster threatening his platoon and everyone within half a mile with destruction. He springs into action, positioning the jeep to drag the mine to a nearby ravine, but as he hooks the chain to the mine, he is again overcome with fear. Lady Jessica tries to inspire him by kicking the mine frantically, calling “I’m not afraid.” She inadvertently activates the mine. Cuffy recovers, hitches the bomb to the jeep and, after a wild ride with Sir Simon aboard, steers it into the ravine, where it explodes.

The courageous act finally frees Sir Simon from his centuries of bondage, and he can sleep at last in the garden. Lady Jessica and Cuffy lay flowers at Sir Simon’s tombstone (1603–1943). A long time to wait, Cuffy observes. Speaking of waiting, Lady Jessica asks Cuffy how old he is. He doesn’t answer but asks, "Why?" "I shall be 7 in May," Jessica replies, shyly. He picks her up and they both laugh.

== Cast ==
- Charles Laughton as Sir Simon de Canterville
- Robert Young as Cuffy Williams
- Margaret O'Brien as Lady Jessica de Canterville
- William Gargan as Staff Sergeant Benson
- Reginald Owen as Lord Canterville
- Rags Ragland as Big Harry
- Una O'Connor as Mrs. Umney
- Donald Stuart as Sir Valentine Williams
- Elisabeth Risdon as Mrs. Polverdine
- Frank Faylen as Lieutenant Kane
- Lumsden Hare as Mr. Potts
- Mike Mazurki as Sgt. Metropolus
- Jack Lambert as Corporal
- William Moss as Hector
- Bobby Readick as Eddie
- Marc Cramer as Bugsy McDougle
- William Tannen as Jordan
- Peter Lawford as Anthony de Canterville
- Vernon Downing as Officer
- Tor Johnson as the Bold Sir Guy
- Gordon Richards as Nobleman

== Production ==
The motion picture was shot at Busch Gardens in Pasadena, California. This was the first feature film edited by Chester Schaeffer. According to Laughton's biographer, Charles Higham, Norman Z. McLeod began direction of the film but was replaced after five weeks when he failed to win the actor's confidence. When Dassin was hired to finish the film, Laughton assisted him with suggestions made out of hearing of cast and crew. Robert H. Planck replaced William Daniels as cinematographer at the same time and is credited with the grainy texture of the black and white production. Of Laughton's performance, Higham wrote that it combined "burlesque, melodrama, pathetic farce, the comedy of manners, and outright tragedy in a rich range."

== Reception ==
John Howard Reid selected The Canterville Ghost as one entry for his 2005 book, Movies Magnificent: 150 Must-See Cinema Classics.

The film is recognized by American Film Institute in these lists:

- 2008: AFI's 10 Top 10:
  - Nominated Fantasy Film

== See also ==
- List of American films of 1944
- List of ghost films
