= I Deal in Crime =

American radio detective series (1946–1948)

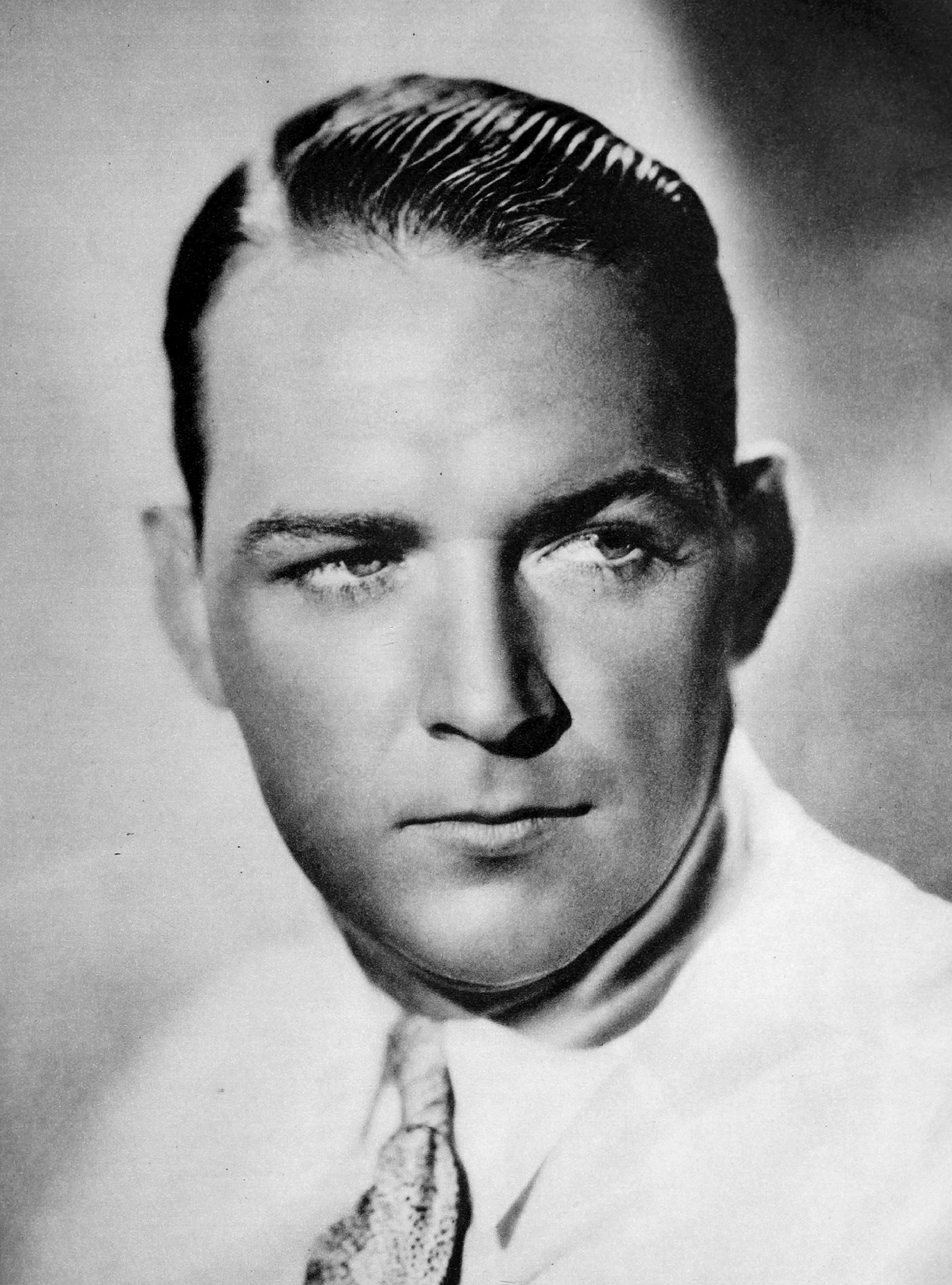
- William Gargan starred as detective Russ Dolan in I Deal in Crime.
- Other names: Ross Dolan, Detective
- Genre: Detective drama
- Country of origin: United States
- Language: English
- Syndicates: ABC; Mutual
- Starring: William Gargan
- Announcer: Dresser Dahlstead
- Written by: Ted Hediger
- Directed by: Leonard Reeg
- Original release: January 21, 1946 – September 4, 1948
- Sponsored by: Hastings

I Deal in Crime is an American old-time radio detective drama. It was broadcast on ABC from January 21, 1946, until October 18, 1947, and on Mutual from October 25, 1947 until September 4, 1948. In 1947, the title was changed to Ross Dolan, Detective.

== Premise ==
Private detective Ross Dolan returned to investigating crimes after serving in the Navy during World War II. A 10-year veteran as a private investigator, he found clients via ads in The Chronicle and worked for $25 per day, plus expenses. Many of Dolan's cases involved murders, and he often encountered problems with the police as he worked. Dolan narrated the stories, "relating his own reactions to the clues as they occur."

Initially, the program was sustaining. In 1946 the Hastings company (a manufacturer of piston rings) began sponsoring the broadcasts.

== Personnel ==
William Gargan portrayed Ross Dolan, the only featured role on the program. Others often heard in support roles were Hans Conreid, Ted de Corsia, Betty Lou Gerson, Mitzi Gould, Joseph Kearns, and Lurene Tuttle. Dresser Dahlstead was the announcer. Leonard Reeg and Ted Hediger were the director and writer, respectively, and Skitch Henderson and his orchestra provided the music.
