= Yours Truly, Johnny Dollar =

CBS radio drama series (1949–1962)

A set of Johnny Dollar episodes showcasing six of the actors who played the title character (in order, Edmond O'Brien, Charles Russell, Mandel Kramer, John Lund, Bob Bailey and Bob Readick)

Yours Truly, Johnny Dollar is a radio drama that aired on CBS Radio from February 18, 1949, to September 30, 1962.

The first several seasons imagined protagonist Johnny Dollar as a private investigator drama, with Charles Russell, Edmond O'Brien and John Lund portraying Dollar in succession over the years. In 1955 after a yearlong hiatus, the series came back in its best-known incarnation with Bob Bailey starring in "the transcribed adventures of the man with the action-packed expense account – America's fabulous freelance insurance investigator." There were 809 episodes (plus two not-for-broadcast auditions) in the 13-year run, and more than 710 still exist today. Jim Cox's book American Radio Networks: A History cites "886 total performances" which includes repeat performances.

== Format ==
The format best remembered was instituted by writer-director Jack Johnstone. Each case usually started with a phone call from an insurance adjuster, calling on Johnny to investigate an unusual claim: a suspicious death, an attempted fraud, a missing person, or other mysterious circumstances. Each story required Johnny to travel to some distant locale, usually within the United States but sometimes abroad, where he was almost always threatened with personal danger in the course of his investigations. He would compare notes with the police officials who had first investigated each strange occurrence, and followed every clue until he figured out what actually happened. Johnny's file on each case was usually referenced as a "matter," as in "The Silver Blue Matter" or "The Forbes Matter". Later episodes were more fanciful, with titles like "The Wayward Trout Matter" and "The Price of Fame Matter" (the latter featuring a rare guest-star appearance by Vincent Price as himself; here Price and Dollar team up to retrieve a painting stolen by Price's insurance agent).

Johnny usually stuck to business, but would sometimes engage in romantic dalliances with women he encountered in his travels; later episodes gave Johnny a steady girlfriend, Betty Lewis. Johnny's precious recreational time was usually spent fishing, and it was not uncommon for Johnny's clients to exploit this favorite pastime in convincing him to take on a job near good fishing locations. His past was rarely mentioned, but Dollar in “The Bennett Matter” described himself as a four-year US Marine veteran who then worked as a police officer for a decade before changing careers to insurance investigation. In "The Blackburn Case" Dollar also refers to his time as a Pinkerton Detective.

Each story was recounted in flashback, and every few minutes the action would be interrupted by Johnny listing a line item from his expense account, which served as an effective scene transition. Most of the expense account related to transportation, lodging, and meals, but no incidental expense was too small for Johnny to itemize, as in "Item nine, 10 cents. Aspirin. I needed them." The monetary amounts weren't always literal: the smallest line item Johnny ever recorded was "two cents: what I felt like" after a professional setback; the largest was "one million dollars" (the way he felt after finding a missing woman and her daughter in a snowbound cabin). The episodes generally finished with Johnny tallying up his expense account and traveling back to Hartford, Connecticut, where he was based. Sometimes Johnny would add a sardonic postscript under "Remarks," detailing the aftermath of the case. ("The Todd Matter," which especially disgusted Johnny, ended abruptly with "Remarks – nil!")

In later seasons the character Johnny Dollar had a radio program within the fictional series, in which he recounted his adventures as true events, with other characters recognizing Dollar's voice from the radio; in the episode “The Salkoff Sequel Matter” Johnny’s radio show becomes an important plot point.

== History ==
=== Original run ===
As originally conceived, Johnny Dollar was a smart, tough, wisecracking detective who tossed silver-dollar tips to waiters and bellhops. Dick Powell starred in the audition show, recorded in 1948, but withdrew from the role in favor of other detective programs, Rogue's Gallery and Richard Diamond, Private Detective. The Johnny Dollar role went instead to Charles Russell. The show for which Powell auditioned was originally titled Yours Truly, Lloyd London, although the name of the show and its lead character were changed to avoid legal problems with the actual insurance company, Lloyd's of London, before the audition tape of December 7, 1948, was recorded.

With the first three actors to play Johnny Dollar – radio actor Russell and movie tough-guy actors Edmond O'Brien (who had played an insurance investigator in the 1946 film noir The Killers) and John Lund – there was little to distinguish Johnny Dollar from other detective series at the time (Richard Diamond, Philip Marlowe and Sam Spade). While always a friend of the police, Johnny wasn't necessarily a stickler for the strictest interpretation of the law. He was willing to let some things slide to satisfy his own sense of justice, as long as the interests of his employer were also protected. One of the script writers in this period was Blake Edwards. The series ended in September 1954.

=== Revival ===
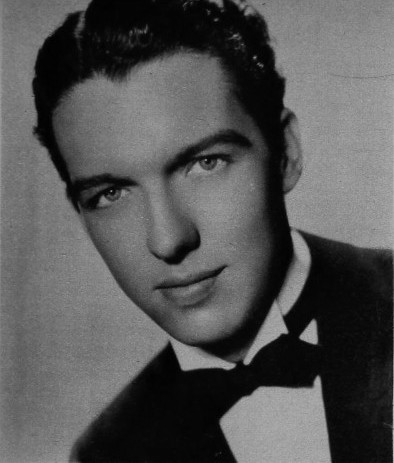
A young Bob Bailey (1937)

CBS Radio revived Yours Truly, Johnny Dollar in October 1955 with a new leading man, a new director, and a new format. The program changed from a 30-minute, one-episode-per-week program to a 15-minute, five-nights-a-week serial (Monday through Friday, 8–8:15 pm EST) produced and directed by radio veteran Jack Johnstone. The new Johnny Dollar was Bob Bailey, who had just come off another network detective series, Let George Do It. With a new lead and 75 minutes of air time each week, it became possible to develop each storyline with more detail and with more characters. Almost all of the Johnny Dollar serials were presented by CBS Radio on a sustaining basis (unsponsored, with no commercials); only two of the 55 serials take time out for a sponsor's message.

Bob Bailey was exceptionally good in this format, making Johnny more sensitive and thoughtful in addition to his other attributes. Radio historian John Dunning said fans often endorse Bailey as the best of the Johnny Dollars, and consider the 13-month run of five-part stories to be some of the greatest drama in American radio history. The serial scripts were usually written by Johnstone, "John Dawson" (a pseudonym for E. Jack Neuman), Les Crutchfield, or Robert Ryf. The show was always produced and directed by Johnstone. Under his "John Dawson" pseudonym, Neuman reworked several of his scripts from the John Lund period, expanding and/or combining them into scripts for the serial format. The show featured a stock company of supporting actors, including Virginia Gregg, Harry Bartell, Vic Perrin, Lawrence Dobkin, Stacy Harris, Parley Baer, Howard McNear, John Dehner, Barney Phillips, Lillian Buyeff, Tony Barrett, Don Diamond, Alan Reed, and Forrest Lewis. Movie character actors appeared occasionally, including Jay Novello, Hans Conried, Frank Nelson, Leon Belasco, William Conrad, Edgar Barrier, Jeanne Bates, Gloria Blondell, and Billy Halop.

In late 1956, CBS Radio reverted the series to a weekly half-hour drama, airing on late Sunday afternoons. There wasn't time to stockpile scripts for the new half-hour format, so CBS occasionally rewrote old scripts from other detective or crime shows files for Johnny Dollar. For example the 1948 script for "The Prodigal Daughter", an episode of Jeff Regan, Investigator starring Jack Webb, was reused for the 1956 Johnny Dollar half-hour "The Royal Street Matter." This recycling was only temporary until producer Jack Johnstone could review and edit new Johnny Dollar scripts.

Bob Bailey continued in the leading role until 1960 and wrote one episode, "The Carmen Kringle Matter," under his first and middle names (Robert Bainter).

Staff announcer Dan Cubberly introduced the program during the Edmond O'Brien run; Roy Rowan was the announcer for the first two years of Bob Bailey's run; he also was an announcer on CBS's I Love Lucy. In "The Laird Douglas Matter," Roy Rowan was written into the script as dog-show expert "Ray Roland." In 1957, Rowan was succeeded by Dan Cubberly, returning to the series.

=== Changes at CBS ===
In June 1959, CBS instituted a budget cutting strategy: its four remaining dramatic series would move from Hollywood to New York City. The shows were Yours Truly, Johnny Dollar; Suspense; Gunsmoke ; and Have Gun – Will Travel.

The plan met with some resistance, because the cast members and crews of Gunsmoke and Have Gun, Will Travel were willing to cancel the shows themselves rather than move to New York. The situation was stalemated for 17 months in negotiations, but all four programs remained on the air. Finally, in November 1960, CBS Radio kept Gunsmoke in California, discontinued Have Gun - Will Travel, and moved Yours Truly, Johnny Dollar and Suspense to New York. Bob Bailey, unwilling to relocate, gave up the Johnny Dollar role. Bailey's last performance, aired November 27, 1960, was in a script titled "The Empty Threat Matter," perhaps writer Johnstone's editorial comment on CBS's intention to shut down production in California.

In New York, CBS staff producer Bruno Zirato Jr. (who also directed TV game shows for CBS) took over Yours Truly, Johnny Dollar, although Johnstone continued to write the scripts. Former child actor Bob Readick took over the leading role in a manner reminiscent of the original Dollar, Charles Russell. After six months he was replaced by Mandel Kramer, who gave the role his own low-key interpretation. Many fans found Mandel Kramer second only to Bailey as the most effective portrayal. Both Readick and Kramer were members of CBS's stock company in New York, and both appeared in other CBS dramas.

=== The end ===
The final episodes of Yours Truly, Johnny Dollar and Suspense, airing on CBS, are often cited as the end of the golden age of radio. The last episode of Johnny Dollar, "The Tip-Off Matter", ended at 6:35 p.m. Eastern Time on September 30, 1962, followed immediately by the final broadcast of Suspense.

Although network radio drama returned to the airwaves – in ABC's Theater Five (1964–65), and CBS Radio Mystery Theater (1974–82) – these were anthology series and did not have continuing character, albeit the latter did spark a bit of a revival of drama on U.S. commercial radio networks in the 1970s.

The "Golden Age" of American radio drama is generally seen to have died with the end of Johnny Dollar and Suspense, which both aired final episodes in 1962.

== Television ==
Three unsuccessful attempts were made to transfer the success of Yours Truly, Johnny Dollar to television. Charles Russell starred in a 1949 pilot directed by Ralph Levy, Bob Bailey starred in a 1958 pilot entitled The Adventures of Johnny Dollar (which failed because Bailey's 5-foot 9-inch, 150-pound physique didn't match the tough-guy characterization), and William Bryant starred in a 1962 pilot entitled Johnny Dollar. The latter was written, produced, and directed by Blake Edwards.

== Actors who portrayed Dollar ==
- Dick Powell (Audition show in 1948)
- Charles Russell (February 1949 – January 1950)
- Edmond O'Brien (February 1950 – September 1952)
- John Lund (November 1952 – September 1954)
- Gerald Mohr (Audition show in 1955)
- Bob Bailey (October 1955 – November 1960)
- Bob Readick (December 1960 – June 1961)
- Mandel Kramer (June 1961 – September 1962)

== Legacy ==
Yours Truly, Johnny Dollar was so familiar to CBS Radio's listeners that the network's resident comedians, Bob and Ray, occasionally satirized it. Their version, "Ace Willoughby, International Detective," followed the Johnny Dollar format of exotic locales, continental officials, cool villains, and tense confrontations, with Ray Goulding doing a letter-perfect imitation of Bob Bailey's delivery. In the comedy version, however, the detective usually gave up on the case after being beaten up incessantly.

Yours Truly, Johnny Dollar was a popular weekly radio mystery play in the 1960s and early 1970s on Radio Iran. The role of Johnny Dollar was played by Heidar Saremi, a popular radio performer. Contrary to the original, Johnny Dollar was more of a criminal investigator. At the end of each episode, the narrator asked the radio audience how Johnny found the perpetrators, making the show a mystery quiz as well as a drama; those who guessed correctly were entered into a raffle for a prize.

In the 1970s and 1980s the comedy troupe The Firesign Theatre released a number of satirical record albums; several featured spoofs of old-time radio featuring the character Nick Danger, Third Eye, who was loosely based on Sam Spade and Johnny Dollar. The scripts included inside references to radio with lines such as, "It had been snowing in Santa Barbara ever since the top of the page," and riffs on radio sound effects.

In 2003, Moonstone Books adapted the Yours Truly, Johnny Dollar radio program into a graphic novel illustrated by Éric Thériault and written by David Gallaher.

The show has been the opening item on The Big Broadcast on WAMU in Washington, D.C. off and on since the early 1990s.

As of August 2017, the show is being aired several times a day on KTQA FM 95.3 in Tacoma, Washington and CHLU-FM in Middle LaHave, Nova Scotia, Canada.

In August 2021, the SiriusXM satellite radio network began airing many episodes of the show on its "Radio Classics" channel 148.

As of February 2019, a documentary about the program, Last Man Standing – Johnny Dollar & the End of Old-Time Radio, has been produced.

In 2023, a new graphic novel series was launched with Johnny Dollar investigating cybercrimes of the modern age. "The man with the action packed expense account" is a cyberinsurance investigator, taking on ransomware actors in the modern age.

In April and May 2025, Johnny Dollar guest-starred in the Dick Tracy comic strip, though to avoid copyright, the character is never referred to by name.

The 2025 time-loop mystery novel Who Killed One the Gun? by Gigi Little contains multiple references to Yours Truly, Johnny Dollar, including specifically the “Cui Bono Matter.”
