= Harrigan's Kid =

1943 film by Charles Reisner

- Theatrical release poster
- Directed by: Charles Reisner
- Screenplay by: Martin Berkeley; Henry Blankfort; Alan Friedman
- Based on: Harrigan's Kid by Borden Chase
- Produced by: Irving Starr
- Starring: Bobby Readick; Frank Craven; William Gargan; J. Carrol Naish; Jay Ward; Douglas Croft
- Cinematography: Walter Lundin
- Edited by: Ferris Webster
- Music by: Daniele Amfitheatrof
- Production company: Metro-Goldwyn-Mayer
- Distributed by: Loew's Inc.
- Release date: March 17, 1943
- Running time: 80 minutes
- Country: United States
- Language: English

Harrigan's Kid is a 1943 American drama film directed by Charles Reisner and written by Martin Berkeley, Henry Blankfort and Alan Friedman. The film stars Bobby Readick, Frank Craven, William Gargan, J. Carrol Naish and Jay Ward. The film was released on March 17, 1943, by Metro-Goldwyn-Mayer.

== Plot ==
Tom Harrigan raises orphaned Benny McNeil to be a first-rate jockey, but fails to bridle the lad's healthy ego. When Benny receives too many rebukes for unsportsmanlike conduct from the racing commission, Tom decides to sell his contract to Garnet before he, too, is censured. Tom also reasons that, by having Benny with a top outfit, he can manipulate his races and make a fortune on the betting. But Benny, thanks to the humanizing influence of Mr. Garnet, has a different idea....

== Cast ==
- Bobby Readick as Benny McNeil
- Frank Craven as Walter Garnet
- William Gargan as Tom Harrigan
- J. Carrol Naish as Jed Jerrett
- Jay Ward as McNamara
- Douglas Croft as Skip
- Bill Cartledge as Joe
- Irving Lee as Dink
- Selmer Jackson as Mr. Ranley
- Allen Wood as Etley
- Jim Toney as Sam
- Mickey Martin as Jockey
- Russell Hicks as Col. Lowry
