= A Lady to Love =

1930 film

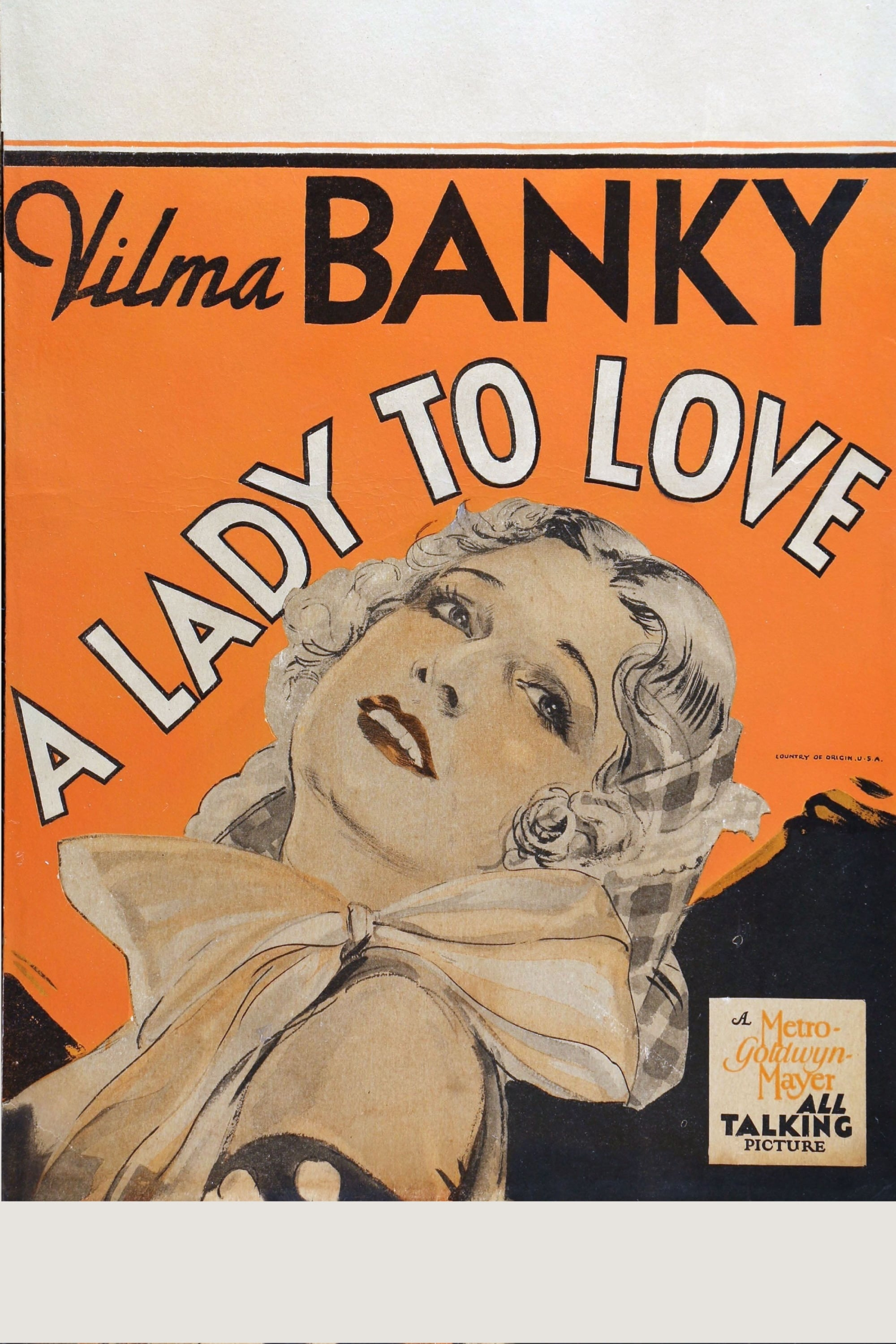
- Window card poster
- Directed by: Victor Sjöström
- Screenplay by: Sidney Howard
- Based on: They Knew What They Wanted by Sidney Howard
- Produced by: Victor Sjöström
- Starring: Vilma Bánky; Edward G. Robinson; Robert Ames; Richard Carle; Lloyd Ingraham
- Cinematography: Merritt B. Gerstad
- Edited by: Conrad A. Nervig; Leslie F. Wilder
- Music by: William Axt
- Production company: Metro-Goldwyn-Mayer
- Distributed by: Metro-Goldwyn-Mayer
- Release date: February 28, 1930
- Running time: 92 minutes
- Country: United States
- Language: English

A Lady to Love is a 1930 American pre-Code drama film directed by Victor Sjöström and written by Sidney Howard. It stars Vilma Bánky, Edward G. Robinson, Robert Ames, Richard Carle, and Lloyd Ingraham. The film was released on February 28, 1930, by Metro-Goldwyn-Mayer. Bánky and Robinson appeared in the German-language version also produced and directed by Sjöström. Otherwise with a different cast, it was released a year later in the United States as Die Sehnsucht Jeder Frau.

== Plot ==
A Lady to Love (1930)

Tony, a prosperous middle-age Italian vineyardist in California, advertises for a young wife, passing off a photograph of his handsome younger hired man, Buck, as himself. Lena, a San Francisco waitress, takes up the offer, and though she is disillusioned upon discovering the truth (particularly since her first sight of Tony is after an accident that saw him break both of his legs), she goes through with the marriage because of her desire to have a home. While first irritated at Buck, she falls weak for him after the wedding that sees her kiss him. He leaves for a time, which leads Lena to decide to take on the effort of serving as Tony's nurse for three months to have something to do. Buck returns at the time that Tony is finally able to use crutches, but she finds that she does in fact have love for her husband.

== Cast ==
- Vilma Bánky as Lena Shultz
- Edward G. Robinson as Tony
- Robert Ames as Buck
- Richard Carle as Postman
- Lloyd Ingraham as Father McKee
- Anderson Lawler as Doctor
- Gum Chin as Ab Gee
- Henry Armetta as Angelo
- George Davis as Giorgio

== Reception ==
Mordaunt Hall in The New York Times praised Robinson but finds the rest lacking: "The picture lacks a pictorial mobility, but its range of acting, as offered by Mr. Robinson, from the lightest humor of emotions, as depicted during the scene when he discovers himself forsaken by his loved ones, is most gratifying."

== Copyright status ==
In 1958, the film entered the public domain in the United States because the claimants did not renew its copyright registration in the 28th year after publication.

== See also ==
- The Secret Hour (1928)
- They Knew What They Wanted (1940)
