= Bob Bailey (actor) =

American radio and film actor (1913–1983)

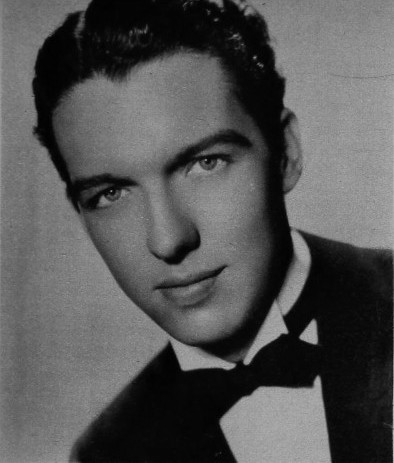
- Bailey in 1937
- Born: Robert Bainter Bailey; June 13, 1913; Toledo, Ohio
- Died: August 13, 1983 (aged 70); Lancaster, California, U.S.
- Resting place: Chapel of the Pines Crematory
- Occupations: Radio and film actor
- Years active: 1928–1964
- Spouse: Glorianna Royston (1936–1962)

Robert Bainter Bailey (June 13, 1913 – August 13, 1983) was an American actor who performed mostly on radio but also appeared in films. His best known role was the titular insurance investigator in the popular radio detective series Yours Truly, Johnny Dollar.

== Early years ==
Bailey was born in Toledo, Ohio. His parents were actor Edwin B. Bailey and actress Grace Lockwood Bailey, both of whom performed in early 1900s stock theater. He made his first appearance on stage with his mother when he was 10 days old. He took his middle name from actress Fay Bainter, who was his godmother. He began performing in his parents' stock company when he was 4 years old and continued to work there until he was 15.

== Career ==
At age 15, Bailey worked in a wild-west carnival as both a barker and an actor. He went on to work at other places as an usher, a waiter, and a guide at an automobile exhibit, among other jobs.

Bailey first worked in radio in Chicago. His mother had left the stage for the newer medium, and she helped him find work on soap operas. He moved to St. Louis when he was offered a job at radio station KWK, but he resumed acting when an executive at KWK made him the head of the station's stock company.

In 1936, Bailey went back to Chicago to get married and to perform with the Chicago Theater of the Air. He remained in Chicago until he had to go to the West Coast for some programs in 1942.

One of Bailey's earliest roles on radio was that of the title character in the comedy serial Mortimer Gooch (1936–37) on CBS. In the early 1940s Bailey was regularly featured on network radio programs originating from Chicago. He played the boyfriend of the title character's sister in That Brewster Boy and the father of the title character in Meet Corliss Archer. He played Bob Jones in Kitty Keene, Inc..

He was signed in 1943 by 20th Century-Fox and appeared in seven feature films; the first two (in which he was most prominent) starred Laurel and Hardy. After the studio failed to renew Bailey's one-year contract, he returned to radio.

Starting in 1946, Bailey starred as freelance detective George Valentine in the radio drama Let George Do It, but he is best remembered as the title character in the long-running radio series Yours Truly, Johnny Dollar. The program ran from 1949 to 1962 (it and Suspense were the last CBS radio drama series on the air until the CBS Radio Mystery Theater began in 1974) and featured the exploits of "America's fabulous freelance insurance investigator"; Bailey starred as Johnny from 1955 to 1960 and wrote the script for the December 22, 1957 episode "The Carmen Kringle Matter" using the pen name "Robert Bainter".

Along with co-writer Hugh King, Bailey wrote the story, "The Big Rainbow" that became the film, Underwater!, nine episodes of Hawkeye and the Last of the Mohicans, as well as an episode of the Ford Television Theatre, "The Legal Beagles". In addition, without King, he wrote two episodes of the 1950s Western TV series, Fury.

With CBS devoting more money to television and wanting to reduce costs, Yours Truly, Johnny Dollar relocated to New York in 1960 and Bailey, unwilling to relocate, was dismissed. Having performed in almost 500 episodes, he had made the role his own. With the end of his involvement, the show wound down over the following two years (with two different actors) before being taken off the air in 1962.

Bailey made a handful of television guest appearances from 1961–1963.

Near the end of the 1962 film Birdman of Alcatraz, he can be seen as one of the reporters gathered around Burt Lancaster and Edmond O'Brien. Bailey's role was only a bit, and most of his dialogue was dubbed by another actor. O’Brien had preceded Bailey in the title role of the Yours Truly, Johnny Dollar radio program.

His last film was an uncredited role in the Disney film, A Tiger Walks.

== Personal life ==
In 1936, Bailey married Glorianna Royston, a model.

== Last years and death ==
Bailey struggled with alcoholism during his career but maintained sobriety for more than 20 years before relapsing in the 1960s. He then disappeared for eight years. He overcame his addiction and reconnected with his family. He worked in a rehab facility helping others with similar struggles until he suffered a stroke that confined him to rest home for the last ten years of his life.

Bailey died in Lancaster, California, aged 70, on August 13, 1983.

== Filmography ==
Year	Title	Role	Notes
1943	Jitterbugs	Chester Wright	starring Laurel and Hardy
1943	The Dancing Masters	Grant Lawrence	starring Laurel and Hardy
1943	Don't Be a Sucker	Mike	leading role in War Department short subject, narrated by Lloyd Nolan
1944	Tampico	Second Mate Watson	
1944	The Eve of St. Mark	Corporal Tate	
1944	Ladies of Washington	Dr. Stephen Craig	
1944	Wing and a Prayer	Ensign Paducah Holloway	
1944	Sunday Dinner for a Soldier	Kenneth Normand	
1953	No Escape	Detective Bob	
1955	Not as a Stranger	Charlie, Patient in Recovery Ward	Uncredited
1958	The Line Up	Staples	
1962	Birdman of Alcatraz	Reporter on Dock	Uncredited
1964	A Tiger Walks	First Reporter at Hotel Desk	Uncredited
