= Enemy Agents Meet Ellery Queen =

1942 film by James P. Hogan

- Directed by: James P. Hogan
- Written by: Eric Taylor; Manfred Lee; Frederic Dannay; Arthur Strawn
- Produced by: Ralph Cohn
- Starring: William Gargan; Margaret Lindsay; Charley Grapewin
- Cinematography: James S. Brown Jr.
- Edited by: Dwight Caldwell
- Music by: Lee Zahler
- Production company: Columbia Pictures
- Distributed by: Columbia Pictures
- Release date: July 30, 1942
- Running time: 64 minutes
- Country: United States
- Languages: English; German

Enemy Agents Meet Ellery Queen is a 1942 American thriller film directed by James P. Hogan and written by Ellery Queen, the duo of Manfred Lee and Frederic Dannay.

The film was the final entry in the Ellery Queen film series.

== Plot ==
During World War II, Detective Ellery Queen aids Free Dutch agents battle Nazi spies over a prize haul of industrial diamonds, which are being smuggled from Holland to the United States via Egypt. The gems are hidden inside a sarcophagus in order to throw both the Nazis agents and the American authorities off the scent. When the smuggler is murdered upon arrival in the US, Ellery Queen and his police-inspector father attempt to solve the killing.

== Cast ==
- William Gargan ... Ellery Queen
- Margaret Lindsay ... Nikki Porter
- Charley Grapewin ... Inspector Richard Queen
- Gale Sondergaard ... Mrs. Van Dorn
- Gilbert Roland ... Paul Gillete
- Sig Ruman ... Heinrich
- James Burke ... Police Sergeant Valle
- Ernst Deutsch ... Dr. Morse
- Maurice Cass ... Mr. Calkus
- Minor Watson ... Commander Lang
- Felix Basch ... Helm
- James Seay ... Marine Sergeant Stevens
- Ludwig Donath ... Reece
- Dick Wessel ... The Big Sailor

== Production ==
The film was original titled Ellery Queen Across the Atlantic, and was produced in May 1942
