= Don't Be a Sucker =

1943 U.S. government film

- Full film
- Production company: U.S. Army Signal Corps
- Distributed by: Paramount Pictures
- Release date: 1945
- Running time: 23 minutes
- Country: United States
- Language: English

Don't Be a Sucker is an anti-fascist film produced by the United States Army Signal Corps. It follows a mason, Mike, who buys into the prejudiced beliefs of a demagogic street speaker until the speaker denounces Freemasons.

A Hungarian Professor refugee (Paul Lukas) then tells Mike how the same prejudiced beliefs led to the rise of fascism in Germany. The film argues that both majority and minority groups are harmed by fascism, and that Americans must unify against fascism regardless of race, religion, or national origin. Don't Be a Sucker saw a resurgence in popularity after the Unite the Right rally in 2017.

== Plot ==
The film opens with a montage depicting various kinds of "sucker", such as a man who bets money on a fixed wrestling match and a man who gets robbed after falling for a honey trap. It then cuts to Mike, an everyman character. Another montage illustrates the various communities that make up America. The narrator warns that Mike is at risk of having this birthright stolen from him by people who see him as a sucker. Mike listens to a street speaker ranting about minority groups and agrees until the man disparages Freemasons, as Mike himself is a Mason. A professor notices his reaction and introduces himself as a European refugee. He tells Mike that the man is trying to manipulate the audience and that the same thing happened in Berlin.

The professor tells Mike about a Nazi street speaker who made similar arguments to the American. Some members of the audience were convinced. Ultimately, however, everyone suffered as the Nazis took power: minorities were persecuted, intellectuals and religious leaders were harassed, and even loyal members of the "master race" had their freedoms curtailed. By the end of Hitler's reign, millions of Germans had died in the service of the Nazi war machine. The professor concludes by arguing that everyone is a minority in some way and that Americans who value their own liberty should defend the liberty of others. Mike is convinced, and he rips up the pamphlet given to him by the prejudiced American speaker.

== Cast ==
- Robert Adler as Listener to Soapbox Orator (uncredited)
- Richard Alexander as Listener to Soapbox Orator (uncredited)
- Robert Bailey as Mike (uncredited)
- Felix Bressart as Anti-Nazi Teacher (uncredited)
- Chick Chandler as Con Artist (uncredited)
- George Chandler as Sucker (uncredited)
- Martin Kosleck as Nazi Orator (uncredited)
- Kurt Kreuger as Hans (uncredited)
- Richard Lane as Soapbox Orator (uncredited)
- Paul Lukas as Hungarian Professor (uncredited)
- Frank O'Connor as Listener to Soapbox Orator (uncredited)
- Robert R. Stephenson as German Citizen (uncredited)
- George E. Stone as Card Player (uncredited)
- Charles Tannen as Mugger (uncredited)
- Ivan Triesault as Priest (uncredited)
- Bobby Watson as Adolf Hitler (uncredited)

== Production ==
Don't Be a Sucker is an anti-fascist film created by Richard Collins. It was produced by the United States Army Signal Corps, and distributed by Paramount Pictures. The film stars Paul Lukas, Felix Bressart, Bob Bailey and Kurt Kreuger, and it is narrated by Lloyd Nolan. It was said to have been produced in 1945, and Paramount Pictures allowed showings for the public "without profit" in 1946. 21st century sources describe a 1943 production and 1947 release instead of 1945 and 1946. The film was later withdrawn from public viewing.

Don't Be a Sucker was created under the initiative of the National Conference of Christians and Jews, and it was the final short film produced by the Army Signal Corps in World War II. It was one of many propaganda films at the time to use the rise of fascism in Germany as a cautionary tale. The film was produced during a time of racial segregation in the United States and the internment of Japanese Americans, which directly conflicted with the film's message. It was originally produced for viewing by American soldiers in World War II, and it sought to challenge the ideas of segregation that were common at the time.

== Themes ==
Don't Be a Sucker challenges prejudice against minorities and warns viewers against complacency in the face of discrimination. Through an appeal to self-interest, the film argues that prejudiced people are being manipulated and do not benefit from prejudiced behavior. It warns that democracy can be broken when the people are divided and that prejudice can cause this. The film provides an alternative to prejudice, arguing in favor of an American populace unified by the ideal of liberty and its protection. Don't Be a Sucker maintains that everyone suffers under fascism, including the groups that the fascist regime allegedly protects. In contrast to the film's anti-fascist position, its villain supports antidemocratic and demagogic ideals.

Don't Be a Sucker was intended to reach a variety of demographics, and appeals to specific minority groups were included throughout. Instead of addressing why fascist beliefs take hold in society, the film remains palatable to the audience by portraying Nazis as manipulators. Separate messages are delivered for viewers in majority or minority groups. Majority groups are told that giving in to prejudice will make the majority subject to fascism, and minority groups are told that they are stronger if they remain united against the threat of fascism. Among religious groups, Catholics, Protestants, and Jews were shown to suffer from prejudiced beliefs. The film creates a feeling of isolation during the street speaker sequence by having the other listeners step away from the Jewish and Catholic listeners as their specific groups are named by the street speaker. The film indirectly addresses the belief that immigrants and African Americans will take the jobs of White Americans. Though it does not directly decry employment discrimination, this is one of the issues on which the street speaker bases his prejudiced arguments.

== Reception and legacy ==
=== 1951 Cooper & Dinerman study ===
A 1951 study conducted by Eunice Cooper and Helen Dinerman found that viewers of Don't Be a Sucker engaged in selective perception for arguments that conflicted with their preconceived beliefs. In some cases, this included viewers interpreting the film to support ideas that do not reflect the intended message or contradict it outright. They found that viewers of the film were more likely to say that fascism could never occur in the United States. The film's emphasis on minority groups instilled in participants the belief that these groups are too numerous for fascism to be a serious threat.

Participants in the study also struggled to take the characters seriously. They saw the American street speaker as harmless and laughable compared to the Nazi street speaker, deeming him ineffective in spreading fascist ideas. They saw Mike as unrelatable because he was "weak, gullible, and passive". The film was found to be successful in discouraging employment discrimination. One quarter of Protestants who viewed the film in this study believed that American-born citizens should be given preferential treatment in employment, compared to one half of Protestants who did not view the film.

=== 2017 resurgence ===
Don't Be a Sucker saw increased popularity beginning in 2016. A two minute clip from the film was widely shared on the internet in August 2017 in response to the Unite the Right rally in Charlottesville, Virginia. Many celebrities and public figures shared the video, including Congressman Keith Ellison from Minnesota and Professor Michael Oman-Reagan of Memorial University of Newfoundland. Those sharing the video made comparisons between the plot of the film and more recent nativism in American politics, deeming it relevant to Trumpism and white nationalism. Various copies have been uploaded to video-sharing sites since then.

== See also ==
- First they came ... – Statement and poem attributed to pastor Martin Niemöller
- The House I Live In – 1945 film by Mervyn LeRoy
