= William Gargan =

American actor (1905–1979)

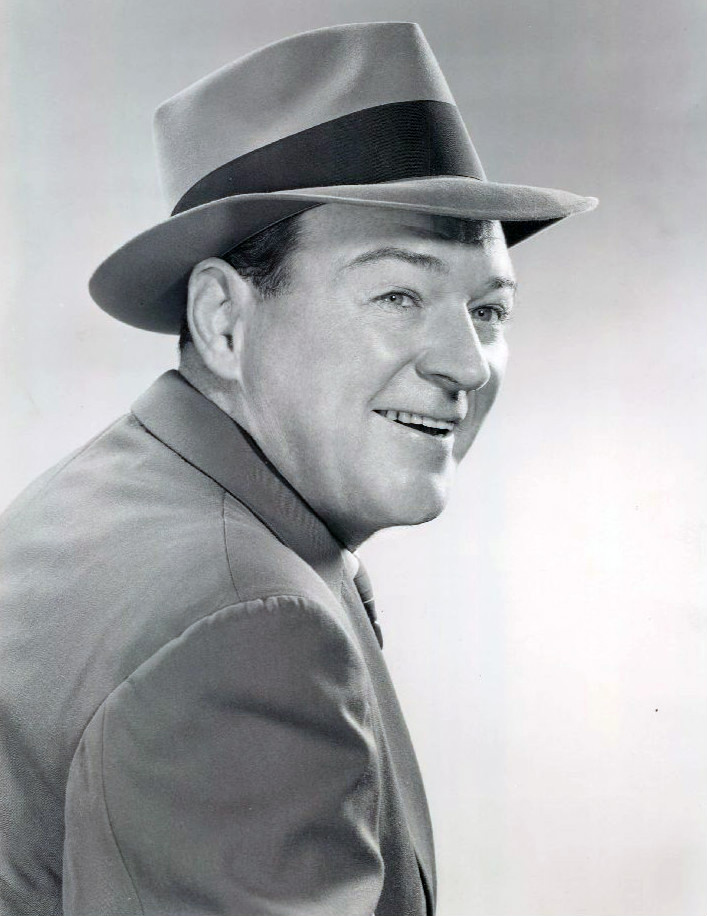
- Gargan in c. 1950s
- Born: William Dennis Gargan; July 17, 1905; Brooklyn, New York, U.S.
- Died: February 16, 1979 (aged 73); San Diego, California, U.S.
- Occupation: Actor
- Years active: 1925–1958
- Spouse: Mary Kenny (m. 1928)
- Children: 2
- Relatives: Edward Gargan (brother)

William Dennis Gargan (July 17, 1905 – February 16, 1979) was an American film, television and radio actor. He was the 5th recipient of the Screen Actors Guild Life Achievement Award in 1967, and in 1941, was nominated for the Academy Award for Best Supporting Actor for his role as Joe in They Knew What They Wanted. He acted in decades of movies including parts in Follow the Leader, Rain, Night Flight, Three Sons, Isle of Destiny and many others. The role he was best known for was that of a private detective Martin Kane in the 1949–1952 radio-television series Martin Kane, Private Eye. In television, he was also in 39 episodes of The New Adventures of Martin Kane.

== Early years ==
Gargan was born on July 17, 1905, in Brooklyn Heights, New York. His parents— Bill and Irene—had seven children, but only Gargan and his brother Edward survived infancy.

His father was a book maker, sometime saloon owner, and gambler. His mother had been a teacher. He graduated from St. Francis Xavier grade school and went to St. James High School in Brooklyn.

Gargan got his first silent movie job at age seven for Vitagraph Studios. He was paid three dollars and eighty-five cents, which is roughly one-hundred twenty dollars in 2023.

Both Gargan and Ed were big kids. By ten, Gargan was hanging out at his father’s bar in the Sunset Park, Brooklyn. Gargan later said that his mother was more straight-laced, a bit of a prude on the surface, but in reality, she ran with dad all her life and his.” Both parents had good senses of humor.

Gargan grew up going to Sea Gate in the summer and fighting on the side of the Irish kids from Bay Ridge against the Italian kids in empty lots. He played baseball and basketball for St. Francis Xavier grade school and St. James High. He shot pool and ditched school in the spring to scale the Ebbets Field fences to watch the Dodgers and their stars of the 1910s — Zack Wheat and Ivan Olson.

When he was fourteen and working as an ice brusher at the Prospect Park skating rink, Gargan met a girl named Mary Elizabeth Kenny. He was so taken by her that he used his broom to knock her down! Gargan recalled that “She climbed right back up, her eyes spitting fire and her mouth not doing badly either. I knew I was in love.”

Kenny lived in Manhattan but spent weekends in Bay Ridge, Brooklyn. They hung out in Coney Island at Feltman’s, at Lundy’s in Sheepshead Bay, or the Loew’s Metropolitan and the Keith’s Prospect. They were later married in 1928.

Although Gargan never cared much for school, he loved the theater. By high school he was playing in school productions of Hamlet, Macbeth, and Romeo and Juliet. However, a teacher who’d been out to get Gargan for his comedic behavior made life so miserable during Gargan's senior year that he dropped out.

Gargan became a message runner for a Broad Street brokerage firm, then an investigator for a clothing store, then a private detective with a Wall Street agency until he was fired for losing a tail. He sold Wesson Oil to grocers in Brooklyn, making great commissions, sneaking away to watch vaudeville shows until he was fired after finding himself sitting next to his boss when the lights came on.

== Stage ==
Bill's brother Edward was an actor. While having lunch with Ed one day at the Lamb’s Club a man named Le Roy Clemens mentioned to Bill that a play he’d written was having tryouts. Bill read a line and was hired, beginning his career in Aloma of the South Seas. They opened in Baltimore in 1924. Gargan was a quick study, learning everyone's parts as well as the stage manager's. Within a year he was directing the Philadelphia production of the play. Aloma of the South Seas ran for forty weeks.

== Film ==
Gargan's first film was Rain. Later, he played in Misleading Lady and had character roles in many Hollywood productions, including starring in three films as detective Ellery Queen.

He was cast in a number of stereotypical Irish parts in films playing policemen, priests, reporters, and blustering adventurers. In 1945, he played Joe Gallagher in The Bells of St. Mary's, starring Bing Crosby and Ingrid Bergman.

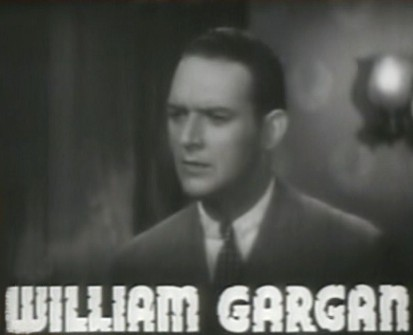
Frame from trailer for Black Fury (1935)

In 1935, Gargan went to England and made several films.

In 1940, Gargan was nominated for the Academy Award for Best Supporting Actor for his role as Joe, the foreman, in They Knew What They Wanted.

== Radio and television ==
Publicity photo of Gargan for the radio series Martin Kane, Private Eye, 1949–1952

Gargan's first regular radio role was Captain Flagg on Captain Flagg and Sergeant Quirt, beginning in February 1942. He also portrayed Ross Dolan in I Deal in Crime, and Inspector Burke in Murder Will Out, and was host of G. I. Laffs

In 1949 Gargan was in New York City when he phoned acquaintance Frank Folsom of RCA. Folsom invited Gargan for lunch. He went to the fifty-third floor of 30 Rockefeller Center. Inside were executives from BBD&O, The New York Stock Exchange, and others. During lunch Gargan mentioned that he was looking for a job in TV.

Folsom phoned Norm Blackburn, VP of TV and Radio at NBC and a good friend of Gargan’s. Gargan was asked if he’d be interested in playing a pipe-smoking detective, sponsored by the U.S. Tobacco Company. The show became Martin Kane, Private Eye. It would be shot for TV and separately done for radio as well. Mutual Broadcasting carried the radio series. It debuted on Sunday August 7, 1949 at 4:30PM eastern time. Meanwhile, the TV version aired on NBC Thursdays at 10PM.

It was live, and the first detective series on network TV with an enormous following. Gargan realized early on that there was only so much you could do with a plot in a half-hour, so he made the series a showcase for himself. He developed a tongue-in-cheek style. Kane's 37.8 TV rating for the 1950-51 season was twelfth overall.

Gargan later said in his autobiography, "This was TV's early era, but a few people tried to make the casual intimacy of TV a sexual intimacy. The sight of pretty women, a touch of deep cleavage, a show of thigh became—to these producers—more important than the content of the show. The result was we often had pretty, empty headed girls blowing their lines all over the lot. In Desperation, I began to mug for the camera more and the script writers began to write more blatantly. You get into a terrible rut this way. Everybody works harder to undo the damage, and the result is more screeching, overacting, and overwriting. It drives the viewers away, and to get them back you come up with more and more desperate gimmickry. What was worse, to me, was the embarrassment. I’m no prude. Probably the best part I ever did on film was that of Joe in The Knew What They Wanted, a wife-stealer. But this was just sleazy."

The next season the show’s rating fell out of the top thirty. By then, Gargan was friends with New York’s Cardinal Spellman. After a friend of Gargan’s mentioned that the Cardinal watched the show, Gargan went to the studio execs and told them to write better scripts or get another star. They got another star — Lloyd Nolan. After eighty-five weeks, Bill Gargan was no longer Martin Kane. Shortly after, Gargan signed a deal with Sonny Werblin, then of MCA, to do a new private eye show for NBC. The show would eventually be called Barrie Craig, Confidential Investigator, which ran from 1951 to 1955. On television, Gargan starred in 39 episodes of Martin Kane, Private Eye, which ran on NBC from 1949 to 1954 and on the syndicated New Adventures of Martin Kane, which ran on NBC in 1957–58.

== Later years ==
In 1960 Randy Hale was set to cast Gargan on stage again in The Best Man. He was to play a dying ex-president, but a bout with laryngitis forced Gargan to get some tests on his throat done. It was throat cancer. Doctors were forced to remove his larynx on November 10, 1960. A breathing stoma was cut into the bottom of his throat so he could breathe. For a time he was depressed, but his friends visited often. Bing Crosby, Dennis Day, Phil Harris, Alice Faye, and many others came by. It helped, and so did his self-professed vanity. Gargan couldn’t bear the thought of not speaking again. He made his first vocal lesson through The American Cancer Society in January 1961.

In 1963, Gargan met President Kennedy. He had a meeting set with the President for November 23, 1963. It was one that President Kennedy never made it to. By then his brother Ed was ill with diabetes and emphysema, and died in 1964. That year, Gargan was hired by the ACS for their full-time national staff.

Within three years, Gargan mastered esophageal speech to the point that people felt that he had regained virtually all of his speaking ability, and sounded much like he had before his laryngectomy. He refused to use a vocal amplifier and worked tirelessly to be able to speak in both low and high tones.

In 1965, Mutual of Omaha presented its annual Criss Award to Gargan for "his inspirational self-rehabilitation efforts and his outstanding contributions to established rehabilitation programs."

No longer able to act, he formed William Gargan Productions, making traditional films and television films in Hollywood.

== Personal life and death ==
Gargan married his wife Mary in Baltimore on January 19, 1928. They had two sons. Bill (nicknamed Barrie) was born on February 25, 1929. Leslie (named after friend Leslie Howard) was born on June 28, 1933.

On February 16, 1979, while on a flight between New York City and San Diego following a tour lecturing for the American Cancer Society, Gargan suffered a heart attack. Upon arrival at San Diego Center City Hospital, he was pronounced dead. He was buried at Holy Cross Cemetery in San Diego, California. Gargan was survived by his wife, two sons and three grandchildren.

== Partial filmography ==
- Lucky Boy (1928) – bit part (uncredited)
- Follow the Leader (1930) – a gangster
- His Woman (1931) – (uncredited)
- Partners (1931, short)
- Misleading Lady (1932) – Fitzpatrick
- Rain (1932) – Sergeant O'Hara
- The Sport Parade (1932) – Johnny Baker
- The Animal Kingdom (1932) – 'Red' Regan
- Lucky Devils (1933) – Bob Hughes
- Sweepings (1933) – Gene Pardway
- The Story of Temple Drake (1933) – Stephen Benbow
- Emergency Call (1933) – Steve Brennan
- Headline Shooter (1933) – Bill Allen
- Night Flight (1933) – Brazilian pilot
- Aggie Appleby Maker of Men (1933) – Red Branahan
- Four Frightened People (1934) – Stewart Corder
- The Line-Up (1934) – Bob Curtis
- Strictly Dynamite (1934) – George Ross
- British Agent (1934) – Bob Medill
- A Night at the Ritz (1935) – Duke Regan
- Traveling Saleslady (1935) – Pat O'Connor
- Black Fury (1935) – Slim
- Don't Bet on Blondes (1935)
- Bright Lights (1935) – Dan Wheeler
- Broadway Gondolier (1935) – Cliff Stanley
- Things Are Looking Up (1935) – Van Gaard
- Man Hunt (1936) – Hank Dawson
- The Milky Way (1936) – Speed McFarland
- The Sky Parade (1936) – Speed Robertson
- Mariners of the Sky/Navy Born (1936) – Lt. Red Furness
- Blackmailer (1936) – Peter Cornish
- Alibi for Murder (1936) – Perry Travis
- Fury and the Woman (1936) – Bruce Corrigan
- Flying Hostess (1936) – Hal Cunningham
- You Only Live Once (1937) – Father Dolan
- Breezing Home (1937) – Steve Rowan
- Wings Over Honolulu (1937) – Lieutenant Jack Furness
- Reported Missing (1937) – Steve Browning
- She Asked for It (1937) – Dwight Stanford
- Behind the Mike (1937) – George Hayes
- Some Blondes Are Dangerous (1937) – George Regan
- You're a Sweetheart (1937) – Fred Edwards
- The Crime of Doctor Hallet (1938) – Dr. Jack Murray
- The Devil's Party (1938) – Mike O'Mara
- The Crowd Roars (1938) – Johnny Martin
- Personal Secretary (1938) – Marcus 'Mark' Farrell
- Within the Law (1939) – Cassidy
- The Adventures of Jane Arden (1939) – Ed Towers
- Broadway Serenade (1939) – Bill
- Women in the Wind (1939) – Ace Boreman
- The House of Fear (1939) – Arthur McHugh
- Three Sons (1939) – Thane Pardway
- The Housekeeper's Daughter (1939) – Ed O'Malley
- Joe and Ethel Turp Call on the President (1939) – Joe Turp
- Double Alibi (1940) – Walter Gifford
- Isle of Destiny (1940) – 'Stripes' Thornton
- Star Dust (1940) – Dane Wharton
- Turnabout (1940) – Joel Clare
- Sporting Blood (1940) – Duffy
- They Knew What They Wanted (1940, Nominated – Academy Award for Best Supporting Actor) – Joe
- Cheers for Miss Bishop (1941) – Sam Peters
- Flying Cadets (1941) – 'Trip' Hammer
- I Wake Up Screaming (1941) – Jerry MacDonald
- Keep 'Em Flying (1941) – Craig Morrison
- Sealed Lips (1942) – Lee Davis
- Bombay Clipper (1942) – James Montgomery 'Jim' Wilson
- A Close Call for Ellery Queen (1942) – Ellery Queen
- A Desperate Chance for Ellery Queen (1942) – Ellery Queen
- Miss Annie Rooney (1942) – Tim Rooney
- The Mayor of 44th Street (1942) – Tommy Fallon
- Enemy Agents Meet Ellery Queen (1942) – Ellery Queen
- Destination Unknown (1942) – Briggs Hannon – aka Terry Jordan
- Who Done It? (1942) – Police Lt. Lou Moran
- No Place for a Lady (1943) – Jess Arno
- Harrigan's Kid (1943) – Tom Harrigan
- Swing Fever (1943) – 'Waltzy' Malone
- The Canterville Ghost (1944) – Sergeant Benson
- She Gets Her Man (1945) – 'Breezy' Barton
- Song of the Sarong (1945) – Drew Allen
- Midnight Manhunt (1945) – Pete Willis
- The Bells of St. Mary's (1945) – Joe Gallagher, Patsy's father
- Follow That Woman (1945) – Sam Boone
- Behind Green Lights (1946) – Lt. Sam Carson
- Strange Impersonation (1946) – Dr. Stephen Lindstrom
- Night Editor (1946) – Police Lt. Tony Cochrane
- Murder in the Music Hall (1946) – Inspector Wilson
- Rendezvous 24 (1946) – Agent Larry Cameron
- Hot Cargo (1946) – Joe Harkness
- Till the End of Time (1946) – Sgt. Gunny Watrous
- Swell Guy (1946) – Martin Duncan
- The Argyle Secrets (1948) – Harry Mitchell
- Waterfront at Midnight (1948) – Mike Hanrohan
- Dynamite (1949) – 'Gunner' Peterson
- Miracle in the Rain (1956) – Harry Wood
- The Rawhide Years (1956) – Marshal Sommers

== Radio appearances ==
Year	Program	Episode/source
1943	Philip Morris Playhouse	Roberta

== Book ==
Gargan's autobiography Why Me? was published by Doubleday in 1969. A reviewer described the book as "a compelling story of the life, faith and courage of a man who as an actor was a notable success."
