= They Knew What They Wanted (play) =

1924 play written by Sidney Howard

They Knew What They Wanted is a 1924 play written by Sidney Howard. The play premiered on Broadway in 1924 and had three Broadway revivals as well as a London production.

== Overview ==
They Knew What They Wanted tells the story of Tony, an aging Italian winegrower in Napa Valley, who proposes by letter to Amy, a waitress in San Francisco who served him once. Fearing that she will find him too old and ugly, Tony sends her a photograph of Joe, his young hired hand, instead of himself. When Amy comes to the vineyard, she discovers Tony has lied to her and problems ensue among Tony, Amy, and Joe.

== Productions ==
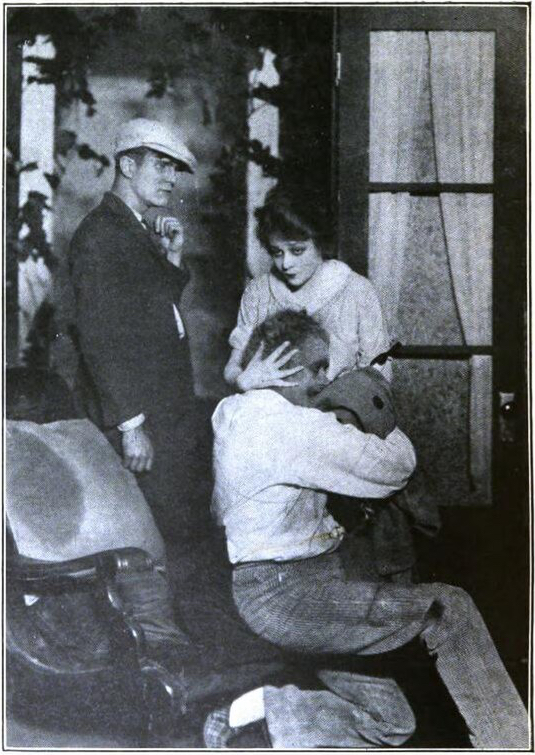
Photo from the original Broadway production. Pictured: Richard Bennett, Pauline Lord, and Glenn Anders.

The play premiered on Broadway at the Garrick Theatre on November 24, 1924, and closed in October 1925, after 192 performances. The original Broadway cast included Richard Bennett as Tony, Pauline Lord as Amy, and Glenn Anders as Joe. The play was directed by Phillip Moeller.

They Knew What They Wanted has been performed numerous times, including three Broadway revivals.

The play was revived on Broadway at the Empire Theatre from October 2, 1939 to October 21, 1939, staged by Robert Ross and featuring Giuseppe Sterni as Tony, June Walker as Amy, and Douglass Montgomery as Joe. Lemuel Ayers designed the costumes for this production.

A revival ran on Broadway at the Music Box Theatre from February 16, 1949 to April 9, 1949. Directed by Robert Perry, the cast starred Paul Muni (Tony), Carol Stone (Amy) and Edward Andrews (Joe).

The Phoenix Theatre presented a critically acclaimed Broadway revival at the Playhouse Theatre, from January 27, 1976 to March 6, 1976. Directed by Stephen Porter, the cast starred Barry Bostwick (Joe), Lois Nettleton (Amy), and Louis Zorich (Tony).

The 1926 London adaptation at St. Martin's Theatre included Sam Livesey as Tony, Tallulah Bankhead as Amy, and Glenn Anders reprising his role as Joe.

The play was also adapted in 1956 into the popular Broadway musical The Most Happy Fella, by Frank Loesser, who wrote the book, music, and lyrics.

== Film ==
Early film versions of the play include The Secret Hour (1928) starring Jean Hersholt and A Lady to Love (1930) starring Edward G. Robinson.

A film in 1940 was made by director Garson Kanin.

It has been argued the play influenced plays such as A Little South of Heaven and films like Love's Brother and A Girl in Australia.

== Awards and nominations ==
The play was awarded the 1925 Pulitzer Prize for Drama. The Pulitzer committee noted: "We have chosen it positively, because we believe that it would stand out in any season, as one of the best plays ever written by an American author. They Knew What They Wanted treats a difficult and delicate theme with rare human insight and even rarer philosophical profundity."

The 1976 Broadway revival received nominations:

- Tony Award, Featured Actor in a Play (Barry Bostwick)
- Tony Award, Featured Actress in a Play (Lois Nettleton)
- Drama Desk, Outstanding Actor in a Play (Louis Zorich)
- Drama Desk, Outstanding Actress in a Play (Lois Nettleton)
- Drama Desk, Outstanding Costume Design (Albert Wolsky)
- Drama Desk, Outstanding Director of a Play (Stephen Porter)
- Drama Desk, Outstanding Lighting Design (James Tilton)
- Drama Desk, Outstanding Revival
- Drama Desk, Outstanding Set Design (James Tilton)
