= Let George Do It (radio) =

American radio drama series (1946 to 1954)

Let George Do It is an American radio drama series produced from 1946 to 1954 by Owen and Pauline Vinson. Bob Bailey starred as private investigator George Valentine; Olan Soule voiced the role in 1954. Don Clark directed the scripts by David Victor and Jackson Gillis.

== History and description ==
The few earliest episodes were more sitcom than private eye shows, with a studio audience providing scattered laughter. The program then changed into a suspenseful tough guy private eye series. An example of the uncertainty/dichotomy between comedy and drama shows up from the very beginning; in the premiere episode, and for several early on, his advertisement read:

Do you have a crime that needs solving? Do you have a dog that needs walking? Have you a wife that needs spanking? Let George do it!

Sponsored by Standard Oil of California, now known as Chevron, the program was broadcast on the West Coast Don Lee network of the Mutual Broadcasting System from October 18, 1946, to September 27, 1954, first on Friday evenings and then on Mondays. In its last season, transcriptions were aired in New York Wednesdays at 9:30 p.m. from January 20, 1954 to January 12, 1955.

Clients came to Valentine's office after reading a newspaper that carried his classified ad:

Personal notice: Danger's my stock in trade. If the job's too tough for you to handle, you've got a job for me. George Valentine. Write full details!

The newspaper ad varied from show to show, but always opened with "Danger is my stock in trade" and closed with "Write full details!"

== Characters and actors ==
George Valentine was a Second World War veteran and professional detective. Valentine's secretary was Claire Brooks, a.k.a. Brooksie (voiced by Frances Robinson, then by Virginia Gregg, and then by Lillian Buyeff). As Valentine made his rounds in search of perpetrators, he occasionally encountered Brooksie's kid brother, Sonny (Eddie Firestone) or elevator man Caleb (Joseph Kearns). Police Lieutenant Riley (Wally Maher) was a more regular guest. For the first few shows, Sonny was George's assistant, given to exclamations such as "Jeepers!" but he was soon relegated to an occasional character.

John Hiestand was the program's announcer.

== Other personnel ==
The background music was supplied by Eddie Dunstedter, initially with a full orchestra. When television supplanted radio as the country's primary home entertainment, radio budgets got skimpier and skimpier and Dunstedter's orchestra was replaced by an organ (played by Dunstedter), as from January 1949.
