= Bob Readick =

American actor (1925–1985)

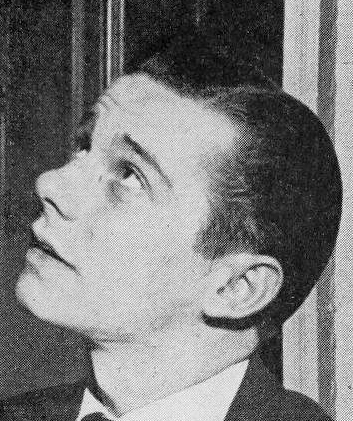
- Readick as "Ricky Browning" (1953)
- Born: November 28, 1925
- Died: May 27, 1985 (aged 59); Trenton, New Jersey, U.S.
- Occupation: Actor
- Father: Frank Readick

Bob Readick (November 28, 1925 – May 27, 1985), also known professionally as Bobby Readick, was an American voice and film actor, best known for a run as the voice of "Johnny Dollar" in the CBS radio series Yours Truly, Johnny Dollar in the early 1960s.

== Career ==
The son of actor Frank Readick, as a child voice actor Bob Readick made his debut as "Bobby Readick" at the age of eight on the CBS children's radio series Let's Pretend. He also appeared as "Pesky Brat" on the radio series Home of the Brave in 1941.

As a teen film actor, he was also credited as Bobby Readick, portraying Benny McNeil in Harrigan's Kid (1943) and Eddie in The Canterville Ghost (1944).

On Broadway, he appeared in George Washington Slept Here (1940), All in Favor (1942), and The Biggest Thief in Town (1949)

A prolific radio actor, by the time he was 23 in 1950 he had appeared in 7,000 broadcasts. He and his father Frank played William Arnold (Frank Readick) and Tom Morley (Bob Readick) in the 1950 CBS radio soap opera This Is Nora Drake, and he was Dr. Ricky Browning in the CBS radio series Hilltop House alongside Jan Miner in 1953. Readick portrayed Dave Wallace in Pepper Young's Family and Dr. John Brent on Road Of Life on NBC and CBS, respectively.

He was also featured as the recurring love interest "Michael Victor" in Marlene Dietrich's 1953–1954 radio series Time for Love. Other radio series he appeared in include Rosemary, The Second Mrs. Burton, Aunt Jenny's Real Life Stories, and Whispering Streets.

At the end of 1960, he began a 26-episode run as "Johnny Dollar" in the CBS radio series Yours Truly, Johnny Dollar (December 1960 – June 1961). He was the fifth actor in the role. In the late 1970s, he appeared on five episodes of CBS Radio Mystery Theater.

== Personal life ==
Readick and his wife, Barbara, wed on May 8, 1955. They had a son, Jodd.

== Filmography ==
Year	Title	Role	Notes
1943	Harrigan's Kid	Benny McNeil	
1944	The Canterville Ghost	Eddie	
