= Ford Theatre (disambiguation) =

Ford Theatre may refer to:

- Ford Theatre, or The Ford Television Theatre, a 1940s–50s anthology series on American radio and TV
- Encounter (Canadian TV series), also known as Ford Television Theatre, a 1950s–60s Canadian TV anthology series
- Ford's Theatre, Washington, D.C., U.S., where President Abraham Lincoln was assassinated
- Ford Theatre (band), an American band 1966–1971
- John Anson Ford Amphitheatre, a music venue in Hollywood Hills, Los Angeles, U.S.
- Ford Theatre at E Center, now Maverik Center, in West Valley City, Utah, U.S.

== See also ==
- Ford's Grand Opera House, a theatre and musical venue in Baltimore, Maryland, U.S.
- Ford Theater (radio series), American dramatic anthology radio program (1947-1949)
