= They Knew What They Wanted (film) =

1940 film by Garson Kanin

- Original lobby card
- Directed by: Garson Kanin
- Screenplay by: Robert Ardrey
- Based on: They Knew What They Wanted by Sidney Howard
- Produced by: Harry E. Edington; Erich Pommer
- Starring: Carole Lombard; Charles Laughton; William Gargan
- Cinematography: Harry Stradling
- Edited by: John Sturges
- Music by: Alfred Newman
- Production company: RKO Radio Pictures
- Distributed by: RKO Radio Pictures
- Release dates: October 8, 1940 (San Francisco); October 25, 1940 (U.S.)
- Running time: 90 minutes
- Country: United States
- Language: English
- Budget: $781,000
- Box office: $932,000

They Knew What They Wanted is a 1940 romance drama film directed by Garson Kanin, written by Robert Ardrey, and starring Carole Lombard, Charles Laughton and William Gargan. It is based on the 1924 Pulitzer Prize winning play They Knew What They Wanted by Sidney Howard. For his performance Gargan was nominated for the Academy Award for Best Supporting Actor. Karl Malden made his film debut.

== Plot ==
When visiting San Francisco, Tony Patucci, an aging illiterate winegrower from the Napa Valley, sees waitress Amy Peters and falls in love. Returning home, he persuades his foreman Joe, an incorrigible womanizer, to write her a letter in Tony's name. Tony's courtship by mail culminates with a proposal, and when she requests a picture of him, he sends one of Joe. Amy accepts and goes to Napa to be married. Although horrified to discover that her prospective husband is the portly Tony, she decides to go through with the marriage. However, while Tony is in bed after an accident, Amy and Joe have an affair. Two months later, as Tony plans the wedding, she discovers that she is pregnant. Upon learning this, Tony pummels Joe, who leaves the vineyards. but forgives Amy, and insists that they still be married. But she is unable to forgive herself, so she leaves with the priest who has come to marry them, while Tony looks on, hoping that she will return one day.

== Cast ==
- Carole Lombard as Amy Peters
- Charles Laughton as Tony Patucci
- William Gargan as Joe
- Harry Carey as the Doctor
- Frank Fay as Father McKee
- Joe Bernard as the R.F.D.
- Janet Fox as Mildred
- Lee Tung Foo as Ah Gee
- Karl Malden as Red (his debut role)
- Victor Kilian as the Photographer

== Reception ==
The film recorded a loss of $291,000. William Gargan was nominated for an Academy Award for Best Supporting Actor.

== Other versions of the play ==
This marked the only time the play was filmed under its original title. Two previous film versions had been made: a silent film called The Secret Hour (1928), with Jean Hersholt in the Laughton role, and an early talkie entitled A Lady to Love (1930), with Edward G. Robinson in the role.

Years later, in 1956, Frank Loesser turned the play into the semi-operatic musical The Most Happy Fella. This was not filmed, but was videotaped in 1980 and shown on PBS.
