= The Finishing Stroke =

1958 novel by Ellery Queen

- First edition
- Author: Ellery Queen
- Language: English
- Series: Ellery Queen mysteries
- Genre: Mystery novel / Whodunnit
- Publisher: Simon & Schuster
- Publication date: 1958
- Publication place: United States
- Media type: Print
- Preceded by: Inspector Queen's Own Case
- Followed by: The Player on the Other Side

The Finishing Stroke is a mystery novel by Ellery Queen, published in 1958. Extremely complex and with many baroque touches, it is something of a throwback to the original Ellery Queen novels of the late 1920s and early 1930s, unlike the more realistic mysteries of Queen's later period. It is set in New York state at three different times in the 20th century: early 1905; the Christmas-New Year's holidays of 1929-1930; and midsummer 1957.

== Plot summary ==
The story begins in the first week of January 1905, with a brief account of a tragic accident and its bizarre aftermath, including a cover-up.

The action then shifts to the waning days of 1929. Shortly after the publication of his first novel, The Roman Hat Mystery, fledgling author/sleuth Ellery Queen is invited to an elaborate house party that will last through the Twelve Days of Christmas. The party includes a number of people connected to John Sebastian, a wealthy young man whose birth was mentioned in the 1905 section and who is about to come into a large inheritance on his birthday, Jan. 6, 1930.

In the days leading up to Sebastian's birthday, a number of strange little gifts are left anonymously for him, as well as doodles and confusing, ominous notes with Christmas-themed verses. Soon the notes contain outright threats. By the time the party is over, there have been two separate murders in the mansion, but Queen and the police cannot solve either of them, and are lucky even to conclusively identify the victims. The investigation does uncover some facts about the 1905 cover-up, but the murders and the threats remain unexplained at the case goes cold, and it is not even clear if they are connected.

Decades later, in 1957, a now middle-aged Queen unexpectedly acquires the police file on the case, including the original journal he kept during the investigation. Queen, with the improved perspective of years of experience, decides to re-examine the facts from 1930. Though it is too late to prove anything in court, he finally figures out who committed the murders and who left the gifts — and why.

== Literary significance & criticism ==
(See Ellery Queen.) This novel offers very little psychological realism, focusing instead on extremely unusual circumstances and bizarre clues that form an essentially abstract puzzle. As in the early Queen stories, there are many potential suspects and unconventional clues. There are also numerous literary and historical allusions, visual aids and even "in-jokes". For instance, the story says the character Ellery Queen, like the young heir, was born in 1905. This is at odds with accounts in the earliest Queen stories, but Frederic Dannay and Manfred B. Lee, who co-wrote the novels under the "Ellery Queen" pen name, were both born in 1905.

To quote some negative criticism of the novel: "Rhymed threats of murder, accompanied by symbolic objectives, bewilder the guests and annoy the reader. The pervasive vulgarity renders the trick plot even less believable and justifies the contempt of those who dismiss all crime fiction as puerile."
