= Ellery Queen and the Murder Ring =

1941 film directed by James P. Hogan

- Theatrical release poster
- Directed by: James P. Hogan
- Screenplay by: Eric Taylor; Gertrude Purcell
- Based on: The Dutch Shoe Mystery by Ellery Queen
- Produced by: Larry Darmour
- Starring: Ralph Bellamy; Margaret Lindsay; Charley Grapewin; Mona Barrie; Paul Hurst; James Burke; George Zucco; Blanche Yurka
- Cinematography: James S. Brown Jr.
- Edited by: Dwight Caldwell
- Music by: Lee Zahler
- Production company: Larry Darmour Productions
- Distributed by: Columbia Pictures
- Release date: November 18, 1941
- Running time: 70 minutes
- Country: United States
- Language: English

Ellery Queen and the Murder Ring is a 1941 American mystery film directed by James P. Hogan and written by Eric Taylor and Gertrude Purcell. It is based on the 1931 novel The Dutch Shoe Mystery by Ellery Queen. The film stars Ralph Bellamy, Margaret Lindsay, Charley Grapewin, Mona Barrie, Paul Hurst and James Burke, George Zucco and Blanche Yurka. The film was released on November 18, 1941, by Columbia Pictures.

== Cast ==
- Ralph Bellamy as Ellery Queen
- Margaret Lindsay as Nikki Porter
- Charley Grapewin as Inspector Queen
- Mona Barrie as Marian Tracy
- Paul Hurst as Page
- James Burke as Sergeant Velie
- George Zucco as Dr. Edwin L. Jannery
- Blanche Yurka as Mrs. Augusta Stack
- Tom Dugan as Lou Thomas
- Leon Ames as John Stack
- Jean Fenwick as Alice Stack
- Olin Howland as Dr. Williams
- Dennis Moore as Dr. Dunn
- Charlotte Wynters as Miss Fox
- Pierre Watkin as Crothers
