= Ellery Queen's Operation: Murder =

Murder mystery game

Ellery Queen's Operation: Murder is a murder mystery game published by Spinnaker Software in 1986 that presents a mystery based on The Dutch Shoe Mystery by Ellery Queen.

== Gameplay ==
Ellery Queen's Operation: Murder uses a VHS videocassette to provide an interactive murder mystery game in which players watch segments of a 30-minute drama. Between segments, clues are read aloud from eight playing cards.

== Reception ==
David M. Wilson reviewed the game for Computer Gaming World, and stated that "The concept of players actively participating in the denouement is not wholly bad [...] because families need to learn how to interact more with each other instead of always viewing their forms of entertainment passively."

In a retrospective review for Flick Attack, Rod Lott found that the acting in the dramatic segments was very bad, and concluded, "I can't imagine anyone having the patience to play this game more than once."
