= James Burke (actor) =

American actor (1886–1968)

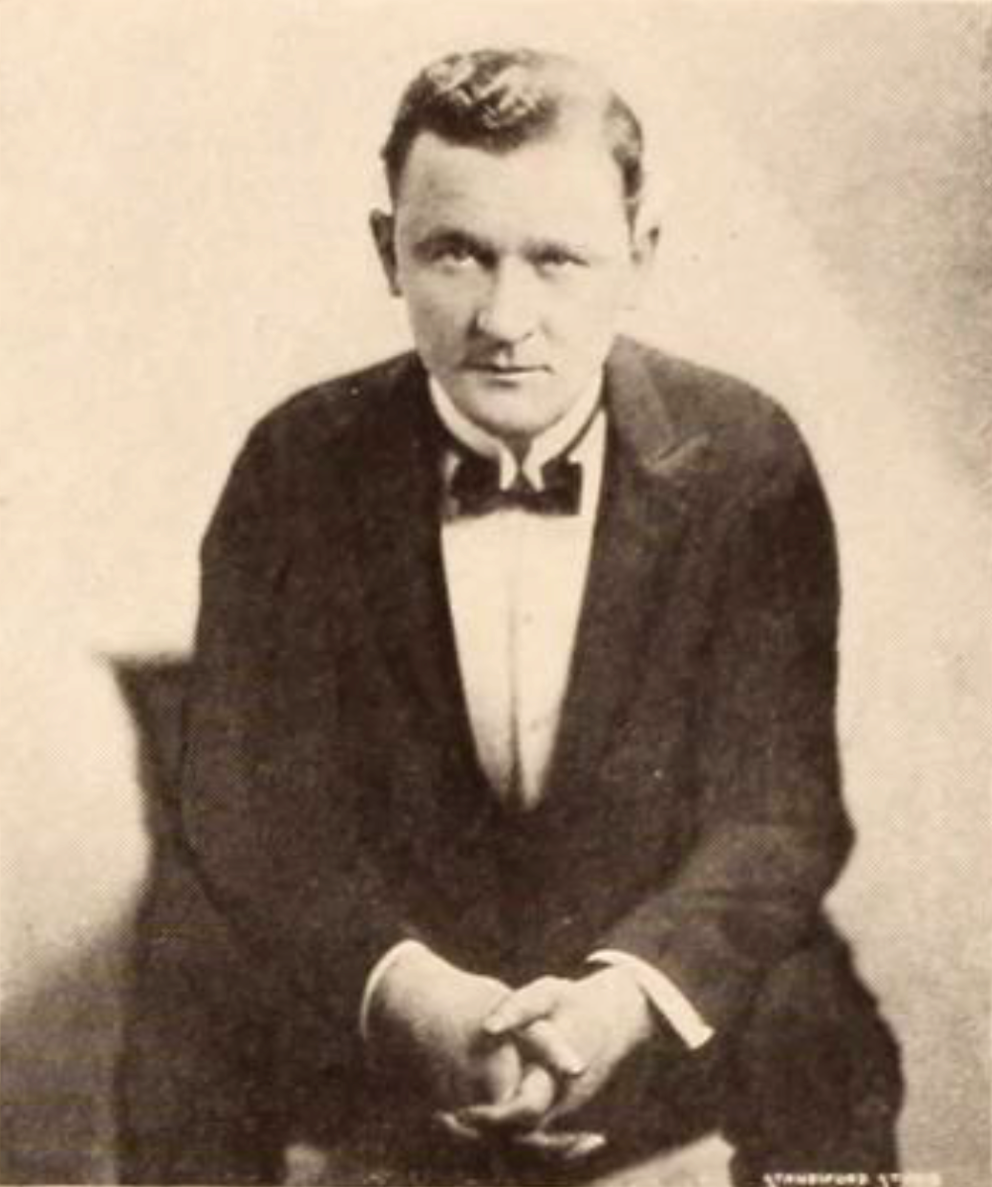
- James Burke in 1923.
- Born: James Michael Burke; September 24, 1886; New York City, NY, U.S.
- Died: May 23, 1968 (aged 81); Los Angeles, California, U.S.
- Occupation: Actor
- Years active: 1932–1959
- Spouse: Eleanor Durkin (div. 1957)

James Michael Burke (September 24, 1886 – May 23, 1968) was an Irish-American film and television character actor born in New York City.

== Career ==
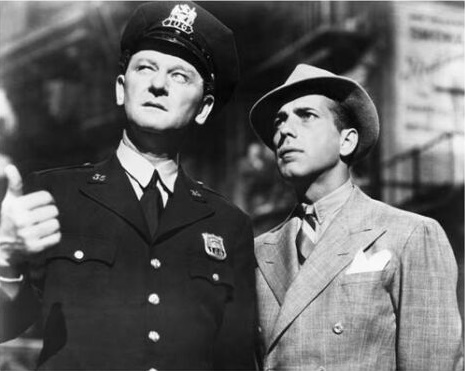
Burke (left) with Humphrey Bogart in film Dead End (1937)

Burke made his stage debut in New York around 1912 and went to Hollywood in 1933. He made over 200 film appearances during his career between 1932 and 1964, some of them unbilled. He was often cast as a police officer, usually a none-too-bright one, such as his role as Sergeant Velie in Columbia Pictures' Ellery Queen crime dramas in the early 1940s. Burke can also be seen in At The Circus, The Maltese Falcon, Lone Star, and many other films. One of his memorable roles is his portrayal of a rowdy rancher in the 1935 comedy Ruggles of Red Gap.

In the early 1950s, Burke co-starred on television alongside Tom Conway in the ABC detective drama Inspector Mark Saber—Homicide Detective, a series later renamed, reformatted, and switched to NBC under the new title Saber of London. In 1955 Burke appeared as Buckshot on the TV western Cheyenne in the episode "Border Showdown." In 1958, he appeared as Sheriff John Tatum in the episode "Bounty" in the TV series Wanted: Dead or Alive. He later appeared in S2 E15 of the series playing Sheriff Blore in "Chain Gang", which aired in 1959.

== Death ==
Burke died on May 23, 1968, in Los Angeles, California, at age 81. His death was attributed to a heart condition.

== Selected filmography ==
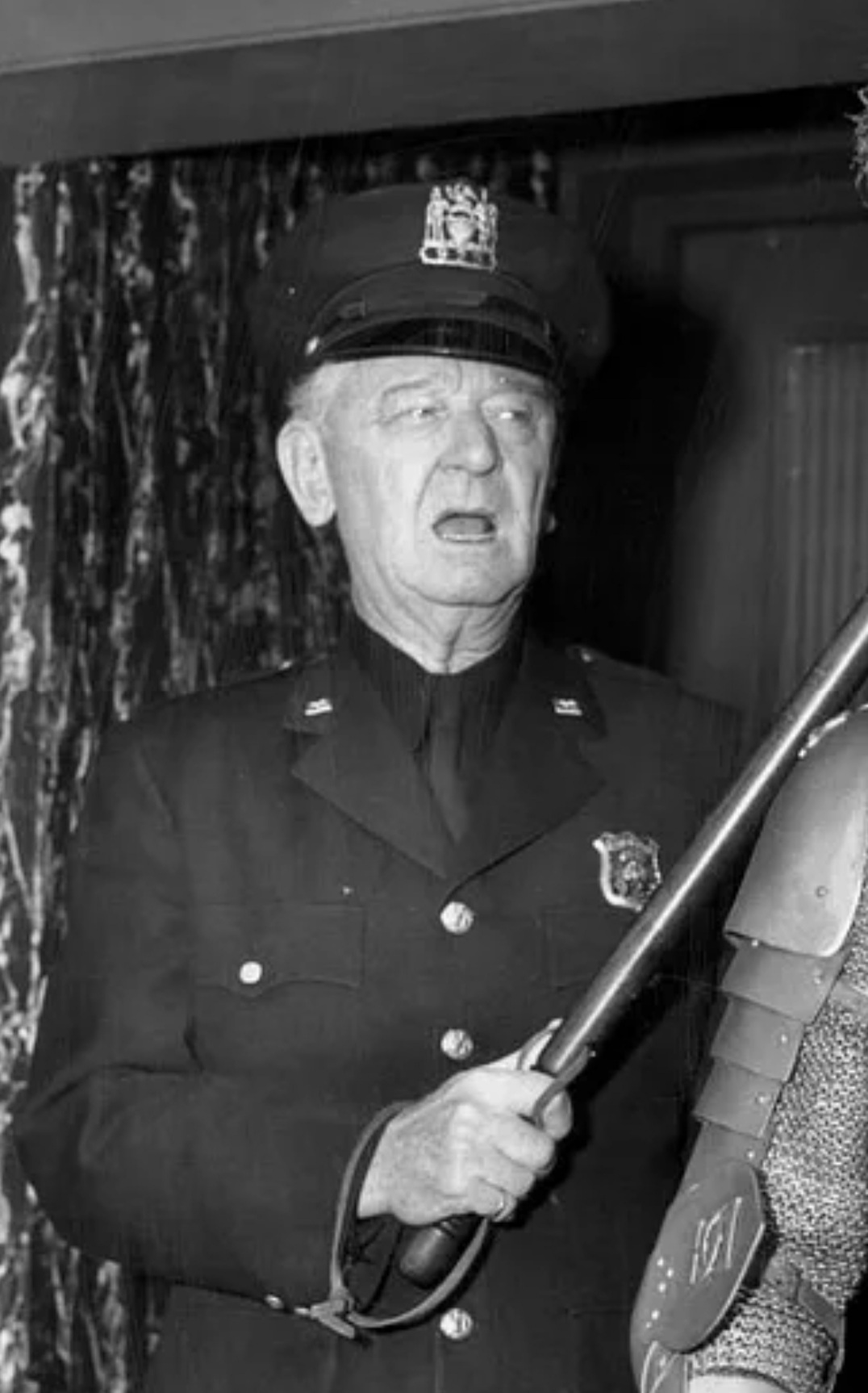
Burke in "Once Upon a Knight", an episode of The DuPont Show with June Allyson (1960).

- The Painted Woman (1932) - Sailor, Yank's Pal (uncredited)
- Face in the Sky (1933) - Cop (uncredited)
- A Lady's Profession (1933) - Mulroy
- The Girl in 419 (1933) - Detective Jackson
- The Man Who Dared (1933) - Registrar of Voters (uncredited)
- College Humor (1933) - Cromwell Dexter
- Her Bodyguard (1933) - Police Captain (uncredited)
- The Power and the Glory (1933) - Gateman (uncredited)
- Torch Singer (1933) - Taxicab Driver (uncredited)
- To the Last Man (1933) - Kentucky Sheriff (uncredited)
- The Bowery (1933) - Recruiting Sergeant (uncredited)
- Bombshell (1933) - First Immigration Officer (uncredited)
- Tillie and Gus (1933) - Juror (uncredited)
- The Kennel Murder Case (1933) - Policeman Who Lets Philo's Dog Out (uncredited)
- Blood Money (1933) - Pool Hall Detective (uncredited)
- Jimmy and Sally (1933) - Furniture Mover (uncredited)
- Gallant Lady (1933) - Policeman in Park (uncredited)
- Lady Killer (1933) - Panhandler (uncredited)
- Queen Christina (1933) - the Blacksmith - 4th Rabble Rouser (uncredited)
- It's a Gift (1934)
- Fugitive Lovers (1934) - Joe Cobb (uncredited)
- All of Me (1934) - Welfare Island Guard (uncredited)
- Six of a Kind (1934) - Detective (uncredited)
- It Happened One Night (1934) - Detective (uncredited)
- Gambling Lady (1934) - Detective Making Raid (uncredited)
- Wharf Angel (1934) - Brooklyn Jack
- Good Dame (1934) - Cop (uncredited)
- City Limits (1934) - King
- Sisters Under the Skin (1934) - Conroy
- A Very Honorable Guy (1934) - Sergeant (uncredited)
- Twentieth Century (1934) - Sheriff (uncredited)
- Sadie McKee (1934) - First Motorcycle Cop (uncredited)
- The Scarlet Empress (1934) - Guard (uncredited)
- The Merry Frinks (1934) - 3rd Expressman (uncredited)
- Little Miss Marker (1934) - Detective Reardon (uncredited)
- Such Women Are Dangerous (1934) - Detective
- Friends of Mr. Sweeney (1934) - Policeman Arresting Wynn (uncredited)
- The Cat's-Paw (1934) - Gargan (uncredited)
- The Girl from Missouri (1934) - Policeman at Cousins' Suicide (uncredited)
- Treasure Island (1934) - Pirate of the Spanish Main
- The Lemon Drop Kid (1934) - First Tramp (uncredited)
- Happiness Ahead (1934) - Policeman (uncredited)
- Lady by Choice (1934) - Brannigan
- Love Time (1934) - Emperor Francis I
- Ticket to a Crime (1934) - Detective Lt. John Aloysius McGinnis
- The Secret Bride (1934) - Diner Counterman (uncredited)
- Rumba (1935) - Reporter (uncredited)
- The Mystery Man (1935) - Managing Editor Marvin
- Ruggles of Red Gap (1935) - Jeff Tuttle
- Mississippi (1935) - Skeptical Passenger in Pilot House (uncredited)
- Princess O'Hara (1935) - A Detective (uncredited)
- Dinky (1935) - Truck Driver
- So Red the Rose (1935) - Major Rushton
- Make a Million (1935) - Pete
- After the Dance (1935) - Police Lieutenant (uncredited)
- Broadway Gondolier (1935) - Uncle Andy
- The Farmer Takes a Wife (1935) - Man Hauling Rifles and Bullets (uncredited)
- Man on the Flying Trapeze (1935) - Patrolman No.2
- Welcome Home (1935) - Michael Shaughnessy
- Call of the Wild (1935) - Ole
- The Affair of Susan (1935) - Hogan
- Here Comes Cookie (1935) - Broken-Nose Reilly
- Case of the Missing Man (1935) - Police Sergeant Rorty
- Remember Last Night? (1935) - Motorcycle Cop (uncredited)
- Music Is Magic (1935) - Mickey (uncredited)
- Coronado (1935) - Slug Moran
- Frisco Waterfront (1935) - Corrigan
- Dancing Feet (1936) - Phil Moore
- It Had to Happen (1936) - Foreman (uncredited)
- The Leathernecks Have Landed (1936) - Corrigan
- The Trail of the Lonesome Pine (1936) - Leader (uncredited)
- Klondike Annie (1936) - Bartender (uncredited)
- Song and Dance Man (1936) - Lt. Mike Boyle
- Forgotten Faces (1936) - Sgt. Johnny Donovan
- Rhythm on the Range (1936) - Wabash
- 36 Hours to Kill (1936) - Doyle
- Pepper (1936) - Hamburger Man (uncredited)
- Old Hutch (1936) - Bank Teller (scenes deleted)
- Can This Be Dixie? (1936) - Sheriff N.B.F. Rider
- Laughing at Trouble (1936) - Sheriff Bill Norton
- Great Guy (1936) - Pat Haley
- Champagne Waltz (1937) - Mr. Scribner
- Pick a Star (1937) - Detective Nolan (uncredited)
- High, Wide and Handsome (1937) - Stackpole
- Dead End (1937) - Officer Mulligan
- Life Begins with Love (1937) - Darby McGraw
- The Perfect Specimen (1937) - Sheriff Bill Snodgrass
- The Buccaneer (1938) - Pirate (uncredited)
- Flight into Nowhere (1938) - Ike Matthews
- Joy of Living (1938) - Mac
- Men with Wings (1938) - J.A. Nolan
- You Can't Take It with You (1938) - Chief Detective (uncredited)
- The Affairs of Annabel (1938) - Muldoon
- The Mad Miss Manton (1938) - Sullivan
- Little Orphan Annie (1938) - Mike Moriarty
- Orphans of the Street (1938) - Police Officer Lou Manning
- The Dawn Patrol (1938) - Flaherty
- The Saint Strikes Back (1939) - Headquarters Police Officer
- Within the Law (1939) - 'Red'
- I'm from Missouri (1939) - Walt Bliss
- The Family Next Door (1939) - Policeman (uncredited)
- Sudden Money (1939) - McPherson
- Dodge City (1939) - Cattle Auctioneer (uncredited)
- On Borrowed Time (1939) - Sheriff Burlingame
- Beau Geste (1939) - Lieutenant Dufour
- Fast and Furious (1939) - Clancy
- At the Circus (1939) - John Carter
- The Cisco Kid and the Lady (1939) - Pop Saunders
- Double Alibi (1940) - Police Captain Orr
- Buck Benny Rides Again (1940) - Taxi Driver
- Charlie Chan's Murder Cruise (1940) - Wilkie
- Opened by Mistake (1940) - Police Sergeant Wilkins
- The Saint Takes Over (1940) - Patrolman Mike
- The Way of All Flesh (1940) - Frisco
- The Golden Fleecing (1940) - Sibley - Motorcycle Cop
- No Time for Comedy (1940) - Police Sergeant (uncredited)
- Little Nellie Kelly (1940) - Sergeant McGowan
- Ellery Queen, Master Detective (1940) - Sgt. Velle
- Ellery Queen's Penthouse Mystery (1941) - Police Sergeant Velie
- Pot o' Gold (1941) - Lt. Grady
- Reaching for the Sun (1941) - Norm
- Million Dollar Baby (1941) - Callahan
- Ellery Queen and the Perfect Crime (1941) - Sgt. Velie
- The Maltese Falcon (1941) - Luke
- Ellery Queen and the Murder Ring (1941) - Sgt. Velie
- All Through the Night (1942) - Lieutenant Forbes
- A Close Call for Ellery Queen (1942) - Police Sgt. Velle
- My Favorite Blonde (1942) - Union Secretary
- A Desperate Chance for Ellery Queen (1942) - Sgt. Velie
- It Happened in Flatbush (1942) - Umpire Shaunnessy
- Are Husbands Necessary? (1942) - Tough Mugg (uncredited)
- Enemy Agents Meet Ellery Queen (1942) - Police Sgt. Velie
- Army Surgeon (1942) - Brooklyn
- A Night to Remember (1942) - Pat Murphy
- No Place for a Lady (1943) - Moriarity
- Dixie (1943) - Riverboat Captain (uncredited)
- Thank Your Lucky Stars (1943) - Bill - the Intern Guard (uncredited)
- Riding High (1943) - Pete Brown (uncredited)
- 3 Men in White (1944) - First Policeman (uncredited)
- Casanova Brown (1944) - O'Leary (uncredited)
- The Horn Blows at Midnight (1945) - Cliffside Park Policeman (uncredited)
- Anchors Aweigh (1945) - Studio Cop
- Guest Wife (1945) - Waiter (uncredited)
- Shady Lady (1945) - Crane
- I Love a Bandleader (1945) - Charles Gibley
- How Doooo You Do!!! (1945) - Detective
- Young Widow (1946) - Motorcycle Cop (uncredited)
- The Virginian (1946) - Andy Jones (uncredited)
- Bowery Bombshell (1946) - Detective O'Malley
- Two Years Before the Mast (1946) - Carrick
- Sister Kenny (1946) - Minor Role (scenes deleted)
- California (1947) - Pokey
- Easy Come, Easy Go (1947) - Harry Weston
- Lost Honeymoon (1947) - Bartender (uncredited)
- Philo Vance's Gamble (1947) - Lt. Burke
- Blaze of Noon (1947) - Farmer (uncredited)
- Living in a Big Way (1947) - Murphy (uncredited)
- Down to Earth (1947) - Detective Kelly
- Gas House Kids in Hollywood (1947) - Police Lt. Burke
- Song of the Thin Man (1947) - Michael Callahan - Police Officer (uncredited)
- Nightmare Alley (1947) - Rural Marshal (uncredited)
- Body and Soul (1947) - Arnold (uncredited)
- The Big Clock (1948) - O'Brien
- The Timber Trail (1948) - Jed Baker
- Texas, Brooklyn and Heaven (1948) - Cop (uncredited)
- Beyond Glory (1948) - Jim, the Bartender (uncredited)
- Night Wind (1948) - Sheriff Hamilton
- June Bride (1948) - Luke Potter
- Shamrock Hill (1949) - Michael Rogan
- Alias Nick Beal (1949) - Bum (uncredited)
- Take Me Out to the Ball Game (1949) - Policeman (uncredited)
- Mighty Joe Young (1949) - Producer (uncredited)
- Red, Hot and Blue (1949) - Joe, Doorman (uncredited)
- The Kid from Texas (1950) - Blacksmith (uncredited)
- Let's Dance (1950) - George (uncredited)
- Copper Canyon (1950) - Jeb Bassett
- Mrs. O'Malley and Mr. Malone (1950) - The Train Conductor
- Valentino (1951) - Policeman in Park (uncredited)
- The Last Outpost (1951) - Stagecoach Driver (uncredited)
- Raton Pass (1951) - Hank
- Excuse My Dust (1951) - MSgt. Nuckols (uncredited)
- His Kind of Woman (1951) - Barkeeper in Nogales (uncredited)
- Warpath (1951) - Oldtimer
- Here Comes the Groom (1951) - O'Neill, Policeman
- Lone Star (1952) - Luther Kilgore
- Denver and Rio Grande (1952) - Sheriff Ed Johnson
- We're Not Married! (1952) - Willie's Sergeant (uncredited)
- Toughest Man in Arizona (1952) - George Ryan (uncredited)
- Lucky Me (1954) - Mahoney
- You're Never Too Young (1955) - Pullman Conductor (uncredited)
- The Birds and the Bees (1956) - Steward (uncredited)
- Back from Eternity (1956) - Grimsby, Airline Manager (uncredited)
- Public Pigeon No. 1 (1957) - Harrigan
- The Unholy Wife (1957) - Sheriff Tom Watling
- Alias Jesse James (1959) - Charlie (uncredited)
- The Young Philadelphians (1959) - Police Officer Barney Flanagan (uncredited)

- "Wagon Train" S1 E17 "The Jesse Cowan Story"-TV 1957-Anse Beale, the peace-loving patriarch of a feuding family

• Stagecoach West - TV (1960/61) - Zeke Bonner (recurring character)
