= The Campus Murders =

1969 novel by Gil Brewer (as Ellery Queen)

- The original 1969 cover
- Author: Gil Brewer (as Ellery Queen)
- Language: English
- Series: The Troubleshooter
- Genre: Mystery
- Publisher: Lancer Books
- Publication date: 1969
- Publication place: United States
- Media type: Print (paperback)
- Followed by: The Black Hearts Murder

The Campus Murders is a 1969 paperback mystery novel by Ellery Queen, ghostwritten by Gil Brewer (1922–1983). Frederic Dannay and his cousin Manfred B. Lee created the Ellery Queen pseudonym and wrote most of the Queen novels, but in their later years they sometimes used ghostwriters. That was especially true for novels, such as this one, that did not feature the fictional sleuth Ellery Queen. "The Campus Murders" is the first of three novels—each ghostwritten by a different author—to feature "troubleshooter" Mike McCall, a U.S. governor's special assistant.

In The Campus Murders, McCall is sent to Tisquanto State College to investigate the disappearance of a female student. Rather than for its largely predictable plot, the novel is remarkable for its depiction of late 1960s student life. McCall, who is in his early thirties, is confronted with radical, violent, long-haired, dirty, drug-taking, and promiscuous students on the one hand and, on the other, traditional faculty members who are unable to understand what is going on around campus and who do not know how to react to the demands voiced by hippies and yippies.

== Plot summary ==
Against the background of a student rebellion, two murders are committed on the Tisquanto State College campus. The first victim is one of the conservative deans, who is stabbed after his life-size effigy has been burned on a stake specially erected by a group of students. The second victim is a female student whose body is found dangling from a rope in the campus bell tower. The missing student is found near a river, severely beaten up and in a coma. The investigation ultimately yields some surprises about the perpetrator and the motive.

== See also ==
- Hillary Waugh's Last Seen Wearing … also revolves around a female college student who goes missing.
- Malcolm Bradbury's The History Man is about the goings-on at a "progressive" university in the South of England.
- Todd Gitlin's The Sixties: Years of Hope, Days of Rage (1987) is a first-hand account by a professor of sociology at the University of California, Berkeley.
