= Ellery Queen =

Detective fiction writer (joint pseudonym)

Frederic Dannay and Manfred Bennington Lee
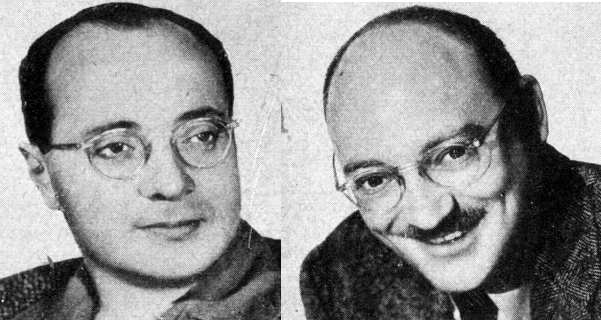
- Manfred Lee (left) and Frederic Dannay
- Born: Daniel Nathan (Dannay); October 20, 1905; Brooklyn, New York Emanuel Benjamin Lepofsky (Lee); January 11, 1905; Brooklyn, New York
- Died: September 3, 1982 (aged 76); White Plains, New York (Dannay) April 3, 1971 (aged 66); Roxbury, Connecticut (Lee)
- Education: New York University (Lee)
- Occupation: Authors
- Years active: 1929–1971
- Spouse: Kaye Brinker, to Lee (m. 1942) Rose Koppel, to Dannay (m. 1975)

Ellery Queen is a pseudonym created in 1928 by the American detective fiction writers Frederic Dannay (1905–1982) and Manfred Bennington Lee (1905–1971). It is also the name of their main fictional detective, a mystery writer in New York City who helps his police inspector father solve baffling murder cases. From 1929 to 1971, Dannay and Lee wrote around forty novels and short story collections in which Ellery Queen appears as a character, starting with The Roman Hat Mystery (1929).

Under the pseudonym Ellery Queen, they also edited more than thirty anthologies of crime fiction and true crime. Dannay founded, and for many years edited, the crime fiction magazine Ellery Queen's Mystery Magazine, which has been published continuously from 1941 to the present. From 1961 onwards, Dannay and Lee commissioned other authors to write thrillers using the pseudonym Ellery Queen, but not featuring Ellery Queen as a character; some such novels were juvenile and were credited to Ellery Queen Jr. They also wrote four novels under the pseudonym Barnaby Ross, which featured the detective Drury Lane. Several movies, radio shows, and television shows have been based on their works.

Dannay and Lee were cousins, who were better known by their professional names. Frederic Dannay was the professional name of Daniel Nathan and Manfred Bennington Lee that of Emanuel Benjamin Lepofsky. Since 2013, the complete works of Ellery Queen have been represented by JABberwocky Literary Agency.

== Personal lives of Dannay and Lee ==
Manfred Bennington Lee was born as Emanuel Benjamin Lepofsky on January 11, 1905, in Brooklyn, New York. He graduated from the New York University with a summa cum laude degree in English in the 1920s. He died on April 3, 1971, in Roxbury, Connecticut, survived by his second wife Kaye Brinker and seven children from the two marriages.

Frederic Dannay was born as Daniel Nathan on October 20, 1905, in Brooklyn, New York. He graduated from high school in Brooklyn and worked in advertising before beginning his collaboration with Manfred Lee. He married his third wife Rose Koppel, an assistant registrar at the Ethical Culture Fieldston School, in 1975 (his first two wives had both died; Dannay had three children from those marriages). He died on September 3, 1982, in White Plains, New York.

== Ellery Queen, the pseudonym ==
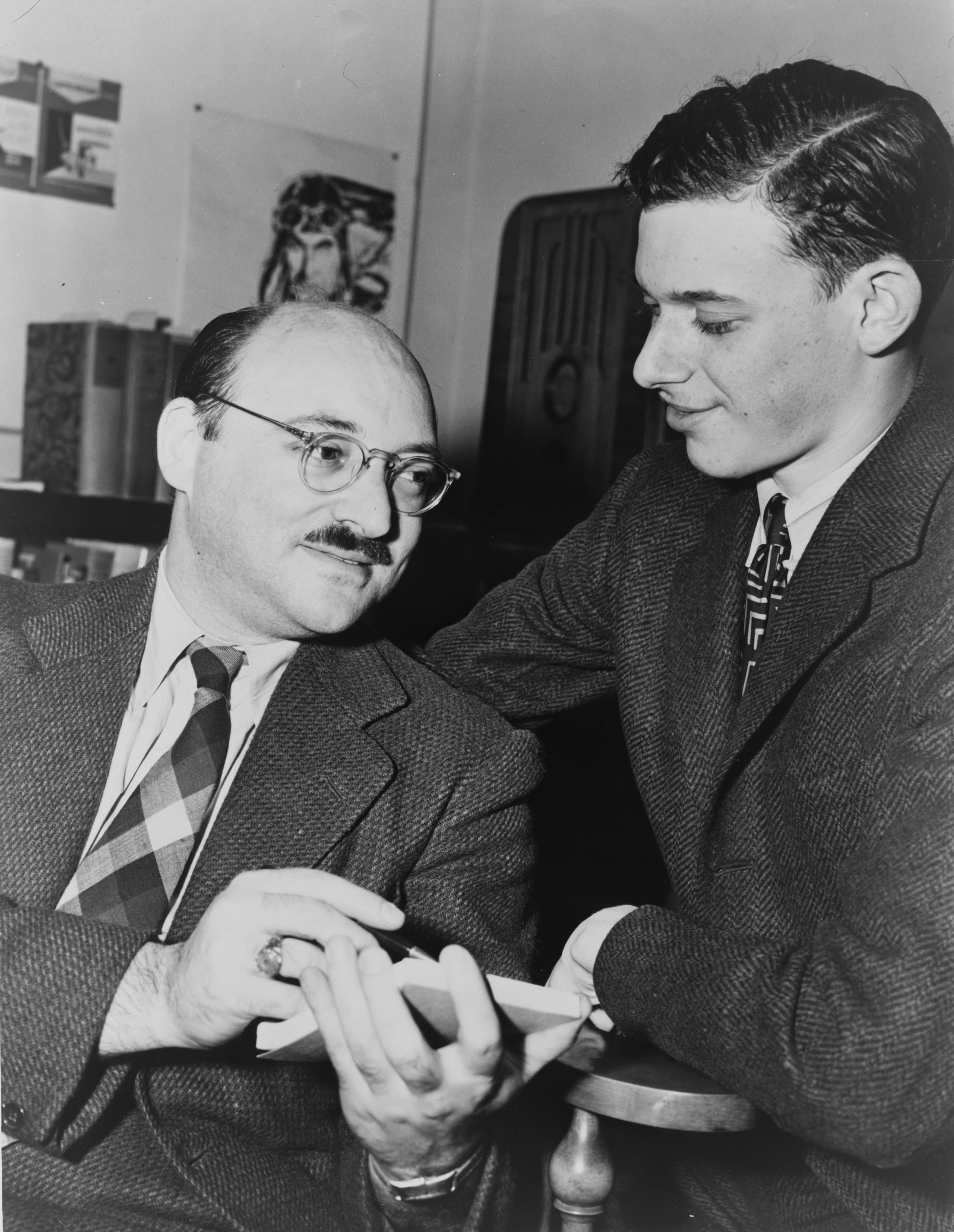
Frederic Dannay (left) with EQMM contributor James Yaffe in 1943.

Ellery Queen was created in the fall of 1928 when Dannay and Lee entered a mystery novel writing contest offering a prize of $7500 (equivalent to $141,000 in 2025) jointly sponsored by McClure's magazine and Frederick A. Stokes Company. They decided to use as their collective pseudonym the same name they had given to their detective as they believed readers tended to remember the names of detectives but forget those of their creators. They were informed that they had won the contest, but McClure's magazine went bankrupt and was absorbed by The Smart Set magazine before they received any money.

The Smart Set magazine rejudged the contest and awarded the prize to an entry by the writer Isabel Briggs Myers but in 1929, Frederick A. Stokes Company agreed to publish Dannay and Lee's story under the title The Roman Hat Mystery. Buoyed by its success, they were contracted to write more mysteries and they went on to write a successful series of novels and short stories that lasted 42 years until Lee's death in 1971.

Nicholas Solovioff painted this cover for a 1955 issue of Ellery Queen's Mystery Magazine.

During the 1940s, Ellery Queen was probably the most popular American mystery writer. More than 150 million copies of Queen's books were sold globally and 'he' remained the best-selling mystery writer in Japan till the end of the 1970s.

Many short stories were also published under the Queen name, which were mostly well received. The novelist and critic Julian Symons called them "as absolutely fair and totally puzzling as the most passionate devotee of orthodoxy could wish" and said they were "composed with wonderful skill" whereas the historian Jaques Barzun said they were "full of ingenious gimmicks and adorned with excellent titles".

Dannay, without much involvement from Lee, founded the crime fiction magazine Ellery Queen's Mystery Magazine in 1941, and served as its editor-in-chief until his death in 1982. However, they together edited numerous collections and anthologies of crime fiction such as The Misadventures of Sherlock Holmes and 101 Years' Entertainment, The Great Detective Stories, 1841–1941. They were awarded the Grand Master Award by the Mystery Writers of America in 1961 for their work under the Ellery Queen pseudonym.

Dannay and Lee remained reticent about their writing methods. Novelist and critic H.R.F. Keating wrote, "How actually did they do it? Did they sit together and hammer the stuff out word by word? Did one write the dialogue and the other the narration? ... What eventually happened was that Fred Dannay, in principle, produced the plots, the clues, and what would have to be deduced from them as well as the outlines of the characters and Manfred Lee clothed it all in words. But it is unlikely to have been as clear cut as that."

According to the crime fiction critic Otto Penzler, "As an anthologist, Ellery Queen is without peer, his taste unequalled. As a bibliographer and a collector of the detective short story, Queen is, again, a historical personage. Indeed, Ellery Queen clearly is, after Poe, the most important American in mystery fiction."

British crime novelist Margery Allingham said that Dannay and Lee had "done far more for the detective story than any other two men put together" and critic Anthony Berkeley Cox famously quoted "Ellery Queen is the American Detective Novel".

Although Dannay outlived Lee by eleven years, the Ellery Queen nom de plume died with Lee. The last novel featuring the character Ellery Queen, A Fine and Private Place, was published in 1971, the year of Lee's death. However, Ellery Queen's Mystery Magazine is still in print, now published as six "double issues" per year by Dell Magazines.

== Ellery Queen, the fictional character ==
Ellery Queen
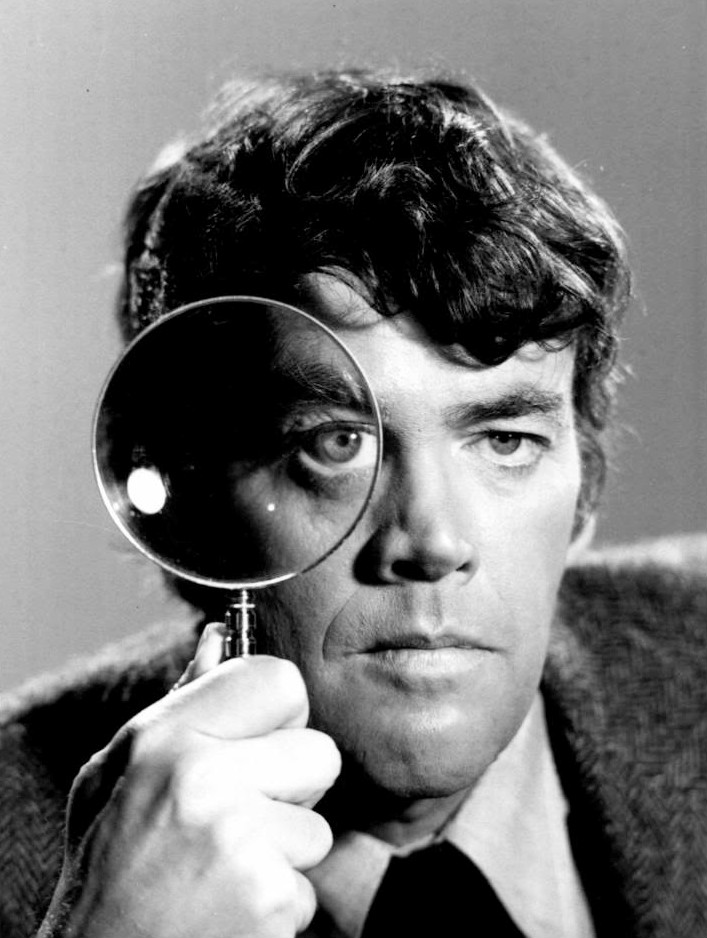
- Jim Hutton as Ellery Queen
- First appearance: The Roman Hat Mystery
- Last appearance: A Fine and Private Place
- Created by: Frederic Dannay and Manfred B. Lee (writing as Ellery Queen)
- Portrayed by: Donald Cook; Eddie Quillan; Ralph Bellamy; Hugh Marlowe; Carleton G. Young; Sydney Smith; William Gargan; Lawrence Dobkin; Howard Culver; Richard Hart; Lee Bowman; George Nader; Lee Philips; Bill Owen; Peter Lawford; Jim Hutton

In-universe information
- Gender: Male
- Occupation: Amateur detective, Author
- Family: Richard Queen (father)
- Nationality: American

Ellery Queen, the fictional character, is the hero of more than thirty novels and several short story collections, written by Dannay and Lee and published under the Ellery Queen pseudonym. The creation of Queen was probably inspired by Philo Vance, the detective created by the writer S.S. Van Dine. According to the critic H.R.F. Keating, "Later the cousins [Dannay and Lee] took a sharper view of Vance, Manfred Lee calling him, with typical vehemence, 'the biggest prig that ever came down the pike'."

As Van Dine had done earlier with Philo Vance, Dannay and Lee gave Ellery Queen an extremely elaborate back story that was rarely mentioned after the first few novels. In fact, Queen goes through several transformations in his personality and his approach to investigation over the course of the series.

In the earlier novels, he is a snobbish Harvard-educated intellectual of independent means who wears pince-nez glasses and writes mystery novels more as a hobby than a profession. He joins his father in investigating crimes because he finds them stimulating. He supposedly derives these characteristics from his unnamed late mother, the daughter of an aristocratic New York family, who had married Richard Queen, a bluff and short policeman.

Beginning in the 1938 novel The Four of Hearts, he spends some time working in Hollywood as a screenwriter. Soon, he has a slick façade, is part of Hollywood society and hobnobs comfortably with the wealthy and the famous. Beginning with Calamity Town in 1942, he becomes less of a cypher and more of a human being, often becoming emotionally affected by the people in his cases, and at one point quitting detective work altogether. Calamity Town and some other novels during this period are set in the imaginary town of Wrightsville, where subsidiary characters recur from story to story as Queen relates to the various strata of American society as an outsider.

However, after his Hollywood and Wrightsville periods, he returns to his New York City roots for the rest of his career, and is then seen again as an ultra-logical crime solver who remains distant from his cases. In the very late novels, he often seems a near-faceless, near-characterless persona whose role is purely to solve the mystery. So striking are the differences between the different periods of the Ellery Queen character that Julian Symons advanced the theory that there were two Ellery Queens — an older and younger brother.

Queen is said to be married and the father of a child in the introductions of the first few novels, but this plot line is never developed and he is portrayed as a bachelor in all of his later appearances. Nikki Porter, who acts as Queen's secretary and is something of a love interest, is first introduced in the radio series The Adventures of Ellery Queen in 1939. Her first appearance in a written story is on the final pages of the 1943 novel There Was an Old Woman, when a character with whom Queen has had some flirtatious moments suddenly announces that she will change her name to Nikki Porter and will work as Queen's secretary. Nikki Porter appears sporadically thereafter in the novels and short stories, linking the character from radio and movies to the written canon.

Paula Paris, an agoraphobic gossip columnist, is linked romantically with Queen in the 1938 novel The Four of Hearts and in some short stories in the 1940s but does not appear in the radio series or films and soon vanishes from the books. Queen is not given any serious romantic interests after Nikki Porter and Paula Paris disappear from the books.

The Queen household, an apartment on West 87th street in New York City, is shared by Ellery Queen and his widowed father, Richard Queen. (Very late in the series, Richard Queen remarries, but how this affects his living arrangement is never spelled out.) The household also contains a houseboy named Djuna in the earlier novels. Possibly of Roma origin, Djuna appears periodically in the canon, apparently ageless and family-free, in a supporting role as cook, receiver of parcels, valet, and occasional comedy relief. He is the protagonist in most of the juvenile novels ghost-written under the pseudonym Ellery Queen Jr.

== Barnaby Ross ==
In 1932 and 1933, Dannay and Lee wrote four novels using the pseudonym Barnaby Ross featuring Drury Lane, a Shakespearean actor who had retired from the stage due to deafness and is now often consulted as an amateur detective. The novels also feature Inspector Thumm (initially as a member of the New York police, later as a private investigator) and his crime-solving daughter Patience. From the 1940s, republications of the Drury Lane books were mostly under the Ellery Queen name.

In the early 1930s, before their identity as the authors behind Ellery Queen and Barnaby Ross had been made public, Dannay and Lee staged a series of public debates with Lee impersonating Queen and Dannay impersonating Ross, both of them wearing masks to preserve their anonymity. According to H.R.F. Keating, "People said Ross must be the wit and critic Alexander Woollcott and Queen [must be] S.S. Van Dine, creator of the super-snob detective Philo Vance, on whom 'Ellery Queen' was indeed modeled."

== Ghostwritten novels ==
Beginning with Dead Man's Tale in 1961, Dannay and Lee allowed the Ellery Queen pseudonym to be used as a house name for 28 crime thrillers written by other authors and published as paperback originals or in book club editions. Dannay had initially opposed this project but was eventually persuaded by Lee, who was in financial difficulty at that time and wanted the extra royalties it would bring. The editing and supervision of these thrillers was done almost entirely by Lee; Dannay refused to even read these books. None of these ghostwritten novels features Ellery Queen as a character. Three of them star "the governor's troubleshooter" Micah "Mike" McCall and six of them feature Captain Tim Corrigan of the New York City Police Department. The prominent science-fiction writer Jack Vance wrote three such novels including the 1965 locked room mystery A Room to Die In.

There were also a few regular Ellery Queen novels in the mid-1960s, including The Player on The Other Side, And On the Eighth Day and The Fourth Side of the Triangle, that utilized a ghost writer working in collaboration with Fred Dannay. This was a period in which Manfred Lee was suffering from writer's block.

Also in the 1960s, Dannay and Lee allowed the Barnaby Ross name to be used as a pseudonym for a series of six historical romance novels by the writer Don Tracy. Other Ellery Queen books that were written wholly or partially by other authors included the "Ellery Queen, Jr." juvenile mysteries and several novelizations of movies and radio dramas published under the Ellery Queen name in the 1940s, as well as one (A Study in Terror) published in 1966.

== Fictional style ==
The Queen novels are examples of "fair play" mysteries, a subgenre of the whodunit mystery in which the reader obtains the clues along with the detective and the mysteries are presented as intellectually challenging puzzles. These types of novels comprised what would later be known as the Golden age of detective fiction (Usually dated from 1920 to 1940 but some critics include the 1940s and even the 1950s). Mystery writer John Dickson Carr called this subgenre "the grandest game in the world".

The first Ellery Queen book The Roman Hat Mystery established a reliable template: a geographic formula title (The Dutch Shoe Mystery, The Egyptian Cross Mystery, etc.); an unusual crime; a complex series of clues and red herrings; multiple misdirected solutions before the final correct solution is revealed, and a cast of supporting characters including Ellery Queen, the detective, Queen's father Inspector Richard Queen and his irascible assistant Sergeant Thomas Velie. What became the best known part of the early Ellery Queen books was the "Challenge to the Reader", a single page near the end of the book, on which Queen, the detective, paused the narrative, directly addressed the reader, declared that they had now seen all the clues needed to solve the mystery, and only one solution was possible. According to Julian Symons, "The rare distinction of the books is that this claim is accurate. These are problems in deduction that do really permit of only one answer, and there are few crime stories indeed of which this can be said... Judged as exercises in rational deduction, these are certainly among the best detective stories ever written." In many earlier books like The Greek Coffin Mystery and The Siamese Twin Mystery, multiple solutions to the mystery are proposed, a feature that also showed up in later books such as Double, Double and Ten Days' Wonder. Queen's "false solution, followed by the true" became a hallmark of the canon. Another stylistic element in many early books (notably The Dutch Shoe Mystery, The French Powder Mystery and Halfway House) is Queen's method of creating a list of attributes (the murderer is male, the murderer smokes a pipe, etc.) and comparing each suspect to these attributes, thereby reducing the list of suspects to a single name, often an unlikely one.

By the late 1930s, when Ellery Queen, the fictional character, had moved to Hollywood to try movie scriptwriting, the tone of the novels changed along with the detective's character. Romance was introduced, solutions began to involve more psychological elements, and the "Challenge to the Reader" vanished. The novels also shifted from mere puzzles to more introspective themes. The three novels set in the fictional New England town of Wrightsville even showed the limitations of Queen's methods of detection. Julian Symons said "Ellery... occasionally lost his father, as his exploits took place more frequently in the small town of Wrightsville... where his arrival as a house guest was likely to be the signal for the commission of one or more murders. Very intelligently, Dannay and Lee used this change in locale to loosen the structure of their stories. More emphasis was placed on personal relationships and less on the details of investigation."

In the 1950s and the 1960s, Dannay and Lee became more experimental, especially in the novels they wrote with other writers. The Player on the Other Side (1963), ghost-written with Theodore Sturgeon, delves more deeply into motive than most Queen novels. And on the Eighth Day (1964), ghost-written with Avram Davidson, is a religious allegory about fascism.

== In other media ==
=== Radio ===
The radio series The Adventures of Ellery Queen was broadcast on several networks from 1939 to 1948 with the lead role played by Hugh Marlowe (1939–1940), Carleton Young (1942–1943), Sydney Smith (1943–1947), Lawrence Dobkin (1947–48) and Howard Culver (1948). All episodes in this series were paused just before the end to allow a panel of celebrities a chance to solve the mystery. Some of the surviving scripts were published for the first time in the 2005 book The Adventure of the Murdered Moths.

Between 1965 and 1967, Ellery Queen's Minute Mysteries were broadcast as radio fillers. They began with the radio announcer Bill Owen saying "This is Ellery Queen..." and contained a short one-minute case.

=== Television ===
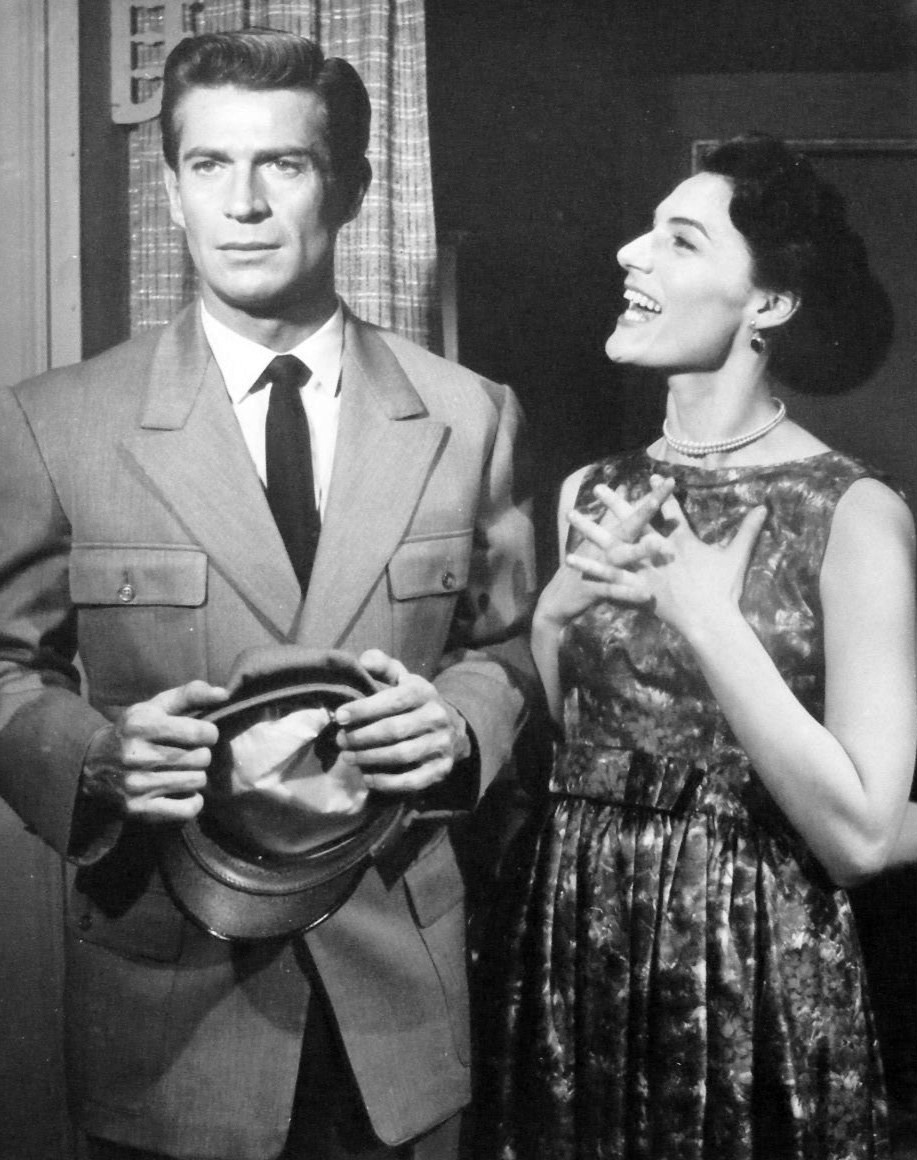
George Nader as Ellery Queen and Marian Seldes in the television program The Further Adventures of Ellery Queen.

Some of the scripts of the television series The Adventures of Ellery Queen (1950–1951 on Dumont, 1951–1952 on ABC) were written by Helene Hanff, best known for her 1970 novel 84, Charing Cross Road. Shortly after the series began, Richard Hart, who played Queen, died and was replaced by Lee Bowman. Florenz Ames played Inspector Queen.

In 1954, Norvin Productions produced the syndicated series Ellery Queen, Detective with Hugh Marlowe reprising his role from the radio series. Inspector Queen was once again played by Florenz Ames. Episodes from this series were broadcast on many local American stations and in United Kingdom between 1954 and 1959 under various titles like Mystery Is My Business, Crime Detective and New Adventures of Ellery Queen.

George Nader played Queen in NBC's The Further Adventures of Ellery Queen (1958–1959), but was replaced by Lee Philips in the final episodes.

Peter Lawford starred as Ellery Queen in the 1971 television film Ellery Queen: Don't Look Behind You (a loose adaptation of the 1949 novel Cat of Many Tails). Harry Morgan played Inspector Richard Queen in this film, but he is described as Ellery Queen's uncle (perhaps to account for the fact that Morgan was only eight years Lawford's senior, or to account for Lawford's British accent).

The 1975 television movie Ellery Queen (aka Too Many Suspects, a loose adaptation of the 1965 novel The Fourth Side of the Triangle) led to the 1975–1976 television series of the same name starring Jim Hutton in the title role with David Wayne as his widowed father Richard Queen. This series was developed by Richard Levinson and William Link, who later won a Special Edgars Award for creating it and Columbo. It was done as a period piece set in New York City in 1946–1947. Sergeant Velie, Inspector Queen's assistant, regularly appeared in it; he had previously appeared in the novels and the radio series, but had not been seen regularly in any of the previous television versions. Each episode contained a "Challenge to the Viewer" in which Queen broke the fourth wall to go over the facts of the case and encouraged the audience to try to solve the mystery before the correct solution was revealed. Eve Arden, George Burns, Joan Collins, Roddy McDowall, Milton Berle, Guy Lombardo, Rudy Vallée, and Don Ameche were among the celebrities featured in this series.

In 2011, in an episode of the crime series Leverage, “The 10 Li'l Grifters Job”, Timothy Hutton's character Nate Ford appears at a murder mystery party dressed as Ellery Queen, in a homage to the actor's late father, Jim Hutton.

=== Films ===
- The Spanish Cape Mystery (1935) - Donald Cook as Ellery Queen, Guy Usher as Inspector Queen (based on The Spanish Cape Mystery)
- The Mandarin Mystery (1936) - Eddie Quillan as Ellery Queen, Wade Boteler as Inspector Queen (loosely based on The Chinese Orange Mystery)
- Ellery Queen, Master Detective (1940) - Ralph Bellamy as Ellery Queen, Margaret Lindsay as Nikki Porter, Charley Grapewin as Inspector Queen (very loosely based on The Door Between)
- Ellery Queen's Penthouse Mystery (1941) - Ralph Bellamy as Ellery Queen, Margaret Lindsay as Nikki Porter, Charley Grapewin as Inspector Queen
- Ellery Queen and the Perfect Crime (1941) - Ralph Bellamy as Ellery Queen, Margaret Lindsay as Nikki Porter, Charley Grapewin as Inspector Queen (loosely based on The Devil To Pay)
- Ellery Queen and the Murder Ring (1941) - Ralph Bellamy as Ellery Queen, Margaret Lindsay as Nikki Porter, Charley Grapewin as Inspector Queen (loosely based on The Dutch Shoe Mystery)
- A Close Call for Ellery Queen (1942) - William Gargan as Ellery Queen, Margaret Lindsay as Nikki Porter, Charley Grapewin as Inspector Queen
- A Desperate Chance for Ellery Queen (1942) - William Gargan as Ellery Queen, Margaret Lindsay as Nikki Porter, Charley Grapewin as Inspector Queen
- Enemy Agents Meet Ellery Queen (1942) - William Gargan as Ellery Queen, Margaret Lindsay as Nikki Porter, Charley Grapewin as Inspector Queen
- La Décade prodigieuse (1971) (English title: Ten Days' Wonder, based on the novel of the same title) - directed by Claude Chabrol and starring Anthony Perkins and Orson Welles. The story is transposed to France and Ellery Queen is replaced in his role as the investigator by a new character, Paul Régis, played by Michel Piccoli.
- Haitatsu sarenai santsu no tegami (1979) (English title: The Three Undelivered Letters) - directed by Yoshitarō Nomura (based on Calamity Town but not containing Queen or any other detective)

=== Theater ===
In 1936, Dannay and Lee, in collaboration with playwright Lowell Brentano, wrote the play Danger, Men Working. The production never made it to Broadway, closing after a few performances in Baltimore and Philadelphia.

In 1949, novelist and playwright William Roos adapted the 1938 novel The Four of Hearts for stage, although it is not known if it was ever performed.

In 2016, American playwright Joseph Goodrich adapted the 1942 novel Calamity Town for stage. The play premiered at the Vertigo Theatre in Calgary, Alberta on January 23, 2016.

=== Comic books and graphic novels ===
Queen, the character, as he appears in the volume 11 of the Detective Conan manga

Ellery Queen appears as a character in some issues of Crackajack Funnies beginning in 1940, a four issue series by Superior Comics in 1949, two issues of a short-lived series by Ziff Davis in 1952, and three comics published by Dell in 1962.

In February 1990, Queen was used as a guest star by the comic book writer Mike W. Barr in the ninth issue of the magazine Maze Agency in the story titled The English Channeler Mystery: A Problem in Deduction.

In July 1996, Queen, the character, was highlighted in the Gosho Aoyoma's Mystery Library section of volume 11 of the Detective Conan manga, a section of the series in which Aoyoma introduces a detective (or occasionally a villain) from mystery literature. A character also stated that he preferred Queen, the author, to Arthur Conan Doyle in volume 12 of the manga.

=== Board games and jigsaw puzzles ===
Ellery Queen's name was attached to many games and puzzles including (Ellery Queen's Great Mystery Game) Trapped in 1956, The Case of the Elusive Assassin by Ellery Queen in 1967, Ellery Queen: The Case of His Headless Highness in 1973, Ellery Queen's Mystery Magazine Game in 1986 and a VCR-based game called Ellery Queen's Operation: Murder (loosely based on The Dutch Shoe Mystery) in 1986.

=== Stamps ===
Queen, the character, was one of the twelve fictional detectives featured on a series of stamps issued by Nicaragua in 1973 to commemorate the 50th anniversary of Interpol and on a similar series issued by San Marino in 1979.

== Awards and honors ==
'Ellery Queen' received the following Edgar Awards from the Mystery Writers of America:

- 1946: Best Radio Drama (tied with Mr and Mrs North)
- 1950: Special Edgar Award for ten years' service through Ellery Queen's Mystery Magazine
- 1961: Grand Master Edgar Award
- 1969: Special Edgar Award on the 40th anniversary of the publication of The Roman Hat Mystery

They were also runners-up for the Edgar in the following categories:

- 1962: Best Short Story (Ellery Queen 1962 Anthology)
- 1964: Best Novel (The Player on the Other Side)

The Mystery Writers of America established the Ellery Queen Award in 1983 "to honor writing teams and outstanding people in the mystery-publishing industry".

== Bibliography ==
=== Ellery Queen and Inspector Richard Queen by Dannay and Lee ===
==== Novels ====
Unless noted, all these titles feature Ellery Queen as a character.

1. The Roman Hat Mystery—1929
2. The French Powder Mystery—1930
3. The Dutch Shoe Mystery—1931
4. The Greek Coffin Mystery—1932
5. The Egyptian Cross Mystery—1932
6. The American Gun Mystery—1933
7. The Siamese Twin Mystery—1933
8. The Chinese Orange Mystery—1934
9. The Spanish Cape Mystery—1935
10. Halfway House—1936
11. The Door Between—1937
12. The Devil to Pay—1938
13. The Four of Hearts—1938
14. The Dragon's Teeth aka The Virgin Heiresses—1939
15. Calamity Town—1942
16. There Was an Old Woman aka The Quick and the Dead—1943
17. The Murderer Is a Fox—1945
18. Ten Days' Wonder—1948
19. Cat of Many Tails—1949
20. Double, Double—1950
21. The Origin of Evil—1951
22. The King Is Dead—1952
23. The Scarlet Letters—1953
24. Inspector Queen's Own Case—1956 (Ellery Queen does not appear)
25. The Finishing Stroke—1958
26. The Player on The Other Side—1963 (ghost-written with Theodore Sturgeon)
27. And on the Eighth Day—1964 (ghost-written with Avram Davidson)
28. The Fourth Side of the Triangle—1965 (ghost-written with Avram Davidson)
29. A Study in Terror—1966 (collaboration with Paul W. Fairman)
30. Face to Face—1967
31. The House of Brass—1968 (ghost-written with Avram Davidson) (very minimal appearance by Ellery Queen)
32. The Last Woman in His Life—1970
33. A Fine and Private Place—1971

==== Novels by Dannay and Lee in which neither Ellery Queen nor Inspector Queen appear ====
- The Glass Village—1954
- Cop Out—1969

==== Novella ====
- The Lamp of God (1935) (first published as House of Haunts in the Detective Story Magazine in 1935, collected in the short story collection The New Adventures of Ellery Queen in 1940, and published as a standalone book in 1950)

==== Short story collections ====
1. The Adventures of Ellery Queen—1934
2. The New Adventures of Ellery Queen—1940 (contains The Lamp of God)
3. The Case Book of Ellery Queen—1945 (reprints five stories from the two previous collections but also includes three new radio scripts)
4. Calendar of Crime—1952
5. QBI: Queen's Bureau of Investigation—1955
6. Queens Full—1966
7. QED: Queen's Experiments In Detection—1968
8. The Best Of Ellery Queen—1985 (edited by Francis M. Nevins)
9. The Tragedy Of Errors—Crippen & Landru, 1999 (includes a previously unpublished synopsis of a Queen novel written by Dannay and all of the previously uncollected short stories)
10. The Adventure of the Murdered Moths and Other Radio Mysteries—Crippen & Landru, 2005

Collections which only contain previously collected short stories are excluded, such as More Adventures of Ellery Queen (1940).

=== Novels by other authors published under the Ellery Queen pseudonym ===
All titles were edited and supervised by Lee except The Blue Movie Murders (1972), which was edited and supervised by Dannay after Lee's death. None of them features Ellery Queen or Inspector Richard Queen as characters. They were mostly published either as paperback originals or in bundled editions with thrillers by other authors.

==== Non-Series ====
- Dead Man's Tale (1961) by Stephen Marlowe
- Death Spins The Platter (1962) by Richard Deming
- Wife Or Death (1963) by Richard Deming
- Kill As Directed (1963) by Henry Kane
- Murder With A Past (1963) by Talmage Powell
- The Four Johns (1964) by Jack Vance
- Blow Hot, Blow Cold (1964) by Fletcher Flora
- The Last Score (1964) by Charles W. Runyon
- The Golden Goose (1964) by Fletcher Flora
- A Room To Die In (1965) by Jack Vance
- The Killer Touch (1965) by Charles W. Runyon
- Beware the Young Stranger (1965) by Talmage Powell
- The Copper Frame (1965) by Richard Deming
- Shoot the Scene (1966) by Richard Deming
- The Madman Theory (1966) by Jack Vance
- Losers, Weepers (1966) by Richard Deming
- The Devil's Cook (1966) by Fletcher Flora
- Guess Who's Coming To Kill You? (1968) by Walt Sheldon
- Kiss And Kill (1969) by Charles W. Runyon

==== Featuring Tim Corrigan ====
- Where Is Bianca? (1966) by Talmage Powell
- Why So Dead? (1966) by Richard Deming
- Which Way To Die? (1967) by Richard Deming
- Who Spies, Who Kills? (1967) by Talmage Powell
- How Goes The Murder? (1967) by Richard Deming
- What's In The Dark? (1968) by Richard Deming

==== Featuring Mike McCall (Troubleshooter series) ====
- The Campus Murders (1969) by Gil Brewer
- The Black Hearts Murder (1970) by Richard Deming
- The Blue Movie Murders (1972) by Edward Hoch

=== Juvenile novels as Ellery Queen Jr. ===
Manfred Lee commissioned the writers Samuel Duff McCoy and James Holding to write juvenile novels under the pseudonym Ellery Queen Jr. but they further 'sub-ghosted' the writing, "arousing the ire of Lee" and "making establishing authorship even worse". All the novels with a color in their title star Djuna, Queen's houseboy. The other two star Gulliver Queen, Queen's nephew.

==== Ghosted by Samuel Duff McCoy and sub-ghosted by Frank Belknap Long ====
- The Black Dog Mystery – 1941
- The Golden Eagle Mystery – 1942

==== Ghosted by Samuel Duff McCoy and sub-ghosted by Harold Montanye ====
- The Green Turtle Mystery – 1944
- The Red Chipmunk Mystery – 1946
- The Brown Fox Mystery – 1948
- The White Elephant Mystery – 1950
- The Yellow Cat Mystery – 1952
- The Blue Herring Mystery – 1954

==== Ghosted by James Holding ====
- The Mystery of the Merry Magician – 1954 (sub-ghosted by Joseph Greene)
- The Mystery of the Vanished Victim – 1954 (sub-ghosted by Paul S. Newman)
- The Purple Bird Mystery – 1966 (unknown if sub-ghosted)

=== Novelizations of movies and radio dramas ===
- The Adventure of the Murdered Millionaire (1941) (novelization of a radio play broadcast on June 18, 1939)
- The Last Man Club (1941) (novelization of a radio play broadcast on June 25, 1939)
- Ellery Queen, Master Detective (1941) aka The Vanishing Corpse (1968) (novelization of the movie of the same name, which was loosely based on the novel The Door Between (1937) )
- The Penthouse Mystery (1941) (novelization of the movie Ellery Queen's Penthouse Mystery (1941) )
- The Perfect Crime (1942) (novelization of the movie Ellery Queen and the Perfect Crime (1941), which was loosely based on the novel The Devil to Pay (1938) )
- A Study in Terror aka Sherlock Holmes vs. Jack the Ripper (1966) (novelization of the movie of the same name, mostly written by Paul W. Fairman with Ellery Queen added as a character by Dannay and Lee in the framing story)

=== Magazines ===
- Mystery League—1933
- Ellery Queen's Mystery Magazine—1941 onwards

=== Novels as Barnaby Ross ===
The four Drury Lane novels were later republished under the Ellery Queen name. The original Barnaby Ross editions of those novels are now collectors' items.

==== By Dannay and Lee ====
- The Tragedy of X—1932
- The Tragedy of Y—1932
- The Tragedy of Z—1933
- Drury Lane's Last Case—1933

==== By Don Tracy ====
- Quintin Chivas – 1961
- The Scrolls of Lysis – 1962
- The Duke of Chaos – 1962
- The Cree from Minataree – 1964
- Strange Kinship – 1965
- The Passionate Queen – 1966

=== Anthologies and collections edited ===
- Challenge to the Reader—1938
- 101 Years' Entertainment, The Great Detective Stories, 1841–1941—1941
- Sporting Blood: The Great Sports Detective Stories—1942
- The Female of the Species: Great Women Detectives and Criminals—1943
- The Misadventures of Sherlock Holmes—1944
- The Best Stories from Ellery Queen's Mystery Magazine—1944
- Dashiell Hammett: The Adventures of Sam Spade and Other Stories—1944
- Rogues' Gallery: The Great Criminals of Modern Fiction—1945
- To The Queen's Taste: The First Supplement to 101 Years' Entertainment, Consisting of the Best Stories Published in the First Five Years of Ellery Queen's Mystery Magazine—1946
- The Queen's Awards, 1946—1946
- Dashiell Hammett: The Continental Op—1945
- Dashiell Hammett: The Return of the Continental Op—1945
- Dashiell Hammett: Hammett Homicides—1946
- Murder By Experts—1947
- The Queen's Awards, 1947—1947
- Dashiell Hammett: Dead Yellow Women—1947
- Stuart Palmer: The Riddles of Hildegarde Withers—1947
- John Dickson Carr: Dr. Fell, Detective, and Other Stories—1947
- Roy Vickers: The Department of Dead Ends—1947
- Margery Allingham: The Case Book of Mr. Campion—1947
- 20th Century Detective Stories—1948
- The Queen's Awards, 1948—1948
- Dashiell Hammett: Nightmare Town—1948
- O. Henry: Cops and Robbers—1947
- The Queen's Awards, 1949—1949
- The Literature of Crime: Stories by World-Famous Authors—1950
- The Queen's Awards, Fifth Series—1950
- Dashiell Hammett: The Creeping Siamese—1950
- Stuart Palmer: The Monkey Murder and Other Stories—1950

and many more

=== Critical works ===
- The Detective Short Story: A Bibliography—1942
- Queen's Quorum: A History of the Detective-Crime Short Story As Revealed by the 100 Most Important Books Published in this Field Since 1845—1951
- In the Queen's Parlor, and Other Leaves from the Editor's Notebook—1957

=== True crime ===
Collections of true crime stories, which were written by Lee alone and originally published in The American Weekly magazine.

- Ellery Queen's International Case Book (1964)
- The Woman in the Case (1967)
