= Ellery Queen's Penthouse Mystery =

1941 film directed by James P. Hogan

- Theatrical release poster
- Directed by: James P. Hogan
- Screenplay by: Eric Taylor
- Based on: The Three Scratches by Ellery Queen
- Produced by: Larry Darmour
- Starring: Ralph Bellamy; Margaret Lindsay; Charley Grapewin; Anna May Wong; James Burke; Eduardo Ciannelli
- Cinematography: James S. Brown Jr.
- Edited by: Dwight Caldwell
- Music by: Lee Zahler
- Production company: Larry Darmour Productions
- Distributed by: Columbia Pictures
- Release date: March 24, 1941
- Running time: 69 minutes
- Country: United States
- Language: English

Ellery Queen's Penthouse Mystery is a 1941 American mystery film directed by James P. Hogan and written by Eric Taylor. It is based on the 1939 play The Three Scratches by Ellery Queen. The film stars Ralph Bellamy, Margaret Lindsay, Charley Grapewin, Anna May Wong, James Burke and Eduardo Ciannelli. The film was released on March 24, 1941, by Columbia Pictures.

== Cast ==
- Ralph Bellamy as Ellery Queen
- Margaret Lindsay as Nikki Porter
- Charley Grapewin as Inspector Queen
- Anna May Wong as Lois Ling
- James Burke as Sergeant Velie
- Eduardo Ciannelli as Count Brett
- Frank Albertson as Sanders
- Ann Doran as Sheila Cobb
- Noel Madison as Gordon Cobb
- Charles Lane as Doc Prouty
- Russell Hicks as Walsh
- Tom Dugan as McGrath
- Mantan Moreland as Roy
- Theodore von Eltz as Jim Ritter
