= The Four of Hearts =

1938 novel by Ellery Queen

- First US edition
- Author: Ellery Queen
- Language: English
- Series: Ellery Queen mysteries
- Genre: Mystery novel / Whodunnit
- Publisher: Stokes (US); Gollancz (UK)
- Publication date: 1938
- Publication place: United States
- Media type: Print
- Preceded by: The Devil to Pay
- Followed by: The Dragon's Teeth

The Four of Hearts is an American mystery novel published in 1938, written by Ellery Queen. The book was first published in condensed form in the October 1938 issue of Cosmopolitan. It is primarily set in Los Angeles, United States.

== Plot summary ==
At the end of the previous Ellery Queen novel, The Devil to Pay, the namesake protagonist was in Hollywood and about to meet studio boss Jacques Butcher. At the beginning of this novel, he does so. Butcher, who is engaged to starlet Bonnie Stuart, hires Queen to work on a screenplay about Bonnie's mother, film legend Blythe Stuart, and her long-running feud with fellow Hollywood veteran Jack Royle. The two were once sweethearts, but their estrangement was bitter, and the feud now extends to their respective children—Bonnie Stuart and young actor Ty Royle.

Jack and Blythe agree to star in the film about their lives. Even more surprisingly, they suddenly rekindle their old romance and get married in front of fans at a Los Angeles airfield. Then, amid huge publicity, they fly off toward a honeymoon island. A few hours later the newlyweds are found fatally poisoned aboard their plane. Queen must interrupt his script-writing to solve a murder case.

Ty and Bonnie vacillate between feuding and a sudden romantic interest, and Queen investigates the mysterious mailings of playing cards that may hold a clue about the killings. His suspicions fall upon the households of Jack and Blythe, and Ty and Bonnie become suspicious of each other. When Queen learns the true meanings of the cards, he solves the case. In the process, he forms a romantic attachment with beautiful gossip columnist Paula Paris, whose agoraphobia keeps her confined to her palatial home, but who has a talent for uncovering secrets that may match Queen's own.

== Literary significance and criticism ==
This period in the Ellery Queen canon signals a change in the type of story told, moving away from the puzzle mystery format which had been a hallmark of earlier novels, and takes him to Hollywood, where he becomes involved with both screenwriting and romance. According to website QBI: "It's fair to say that the Hollywood novels made a pleasant read, but nothing more. ... Marvellously twisted plotting a throwback to the earlier Queens, with the final revelations fairly deducible from the clues."

The novel was adapted into a stage play by writer William Roos using the pen name William Rand in 1949.
