= The Dragon's Teeth =

Novel by Ellery Queen

The Dragon's Teeth (also known as The Virgin Heiresses)
- First US edition
- Author: Ellery Queen
- Language: English
- Series: Ellery Queen
- Genre: Mystery fiction
- Publisher: Stokes (US); Gollancz (UK)
- Publication date: 1939
- Publication place: United States
- Media type: Print
- Pages: 325
- Preceded by: The Four of Hearts
- Followed by: Calamity Town

The Dragon's Teeth (also published as The Virgin Heiresses) is a mystery novel published in 1939 featuring the fictional character Ellery Queen, which is also the pseudonym of the book's authors, Frederic Dannay and Manfred Lee. It is primarily set in New York City, United States.

== Plot summary ==
An eccentric millionaire, Cadmus Cole, visits the newly founded offices of "Ellery Queen, Confidential Investigations", in a rare incidence of disembarkation from his yacht. The investigation company is actually the brainchild and sole responsibility of Ellery's partner, "Beau" Rummell, an established private eye. The eccentric Mr. Cole pays $15,000 as a retainer to hire Ellery Queen for an investigation—the details of which he refuses to divulge, saying only "You'll know when the time comes." Upon his departure, he leaves behind a well-chewed fountain pen with which he's signed the retainer cheque. Almost immediately, Ellery's appendix bursts, and Cadmus Cole is reported dead and buried at sea. Rummell, in the guise of Ellery Queen, begins to investigate both the circumstances of Cole's death and his heirs; he soon meets two beautiful young women and the case becomes complicated by romance and the appearance of a claimant under the will. When the claimant is murdered, and Rummell married to one of the beauties, the real Ellery Queen must take a hand and solve the case, using the vital clue of the chewed fountain pen.

== Literary significance and criticism ==
After numerous mystery novels and a number of movies, the character of Ellery Queen was at this point firmly established. This novel is part of the Ellery Queen canon, though Beau Rummell is never seen again in the canon, and Ellery Queen never opens another detective agency in the books (although he maintains an office in more than one film).

According to critics Barzun and Taylor: "Ellery directs his partner in a vague investigation of a recluse millionaire's death at sea. Full of exaggerations and rank dialogue, and guilty of the old fallacy that a body must be shown to establish murder."
