= No Place for a Lady =

1943 film by James P. Hogan

- Directed by: James P. Hogan
- Written by: Eric Taylor
- Produced by: Ralph Cohn
- Starring: William Gargan; Margaret Lindsay; Phyllis Brooks
- Cinematography: James S. Brown Jr.
- Edited by: Dwight Caldwell
- Music by: Lee Zahler
- Distributed by: Columbia Pictures
- Release date: February 11, 1943 (USA)
- Running time: 66 minutes
- Country: United States
- Language: English

No Place for a Lady is a 1943 black and white mystery film, directed by James P. Hogan. It was followed by a second Jess Arno film, The Devil's Henchman.

== Plot ==
At a warehouse in Los Angeles, trucks are loaded with stacks of tires to be delivered to a San Francisco warehouse. On a country road under cover of darkness, the tires are transferred to Joe Wembley (Frank M. Thomas), an underworld figure and operator of a nightclub at the beach. With the $50,000 earned from the transaction, Evelyn Harris (Doris Lloyd), who inherited the tire business from her late husband, plans to marry Eddie Moore (Jerome Cowan), a singer at Wembley's café. The two lovebirds head for New York City, but Moore insists on stopping at an unoccupied cottage he notices from the road.

In San Francisco private detective Jess Arno (William Gargan) succeeds in clearing actress Dolly Adair (Phyllis Brooks) of a murder charge and becomes a media sensation. After the trial is over, Jess rushes to phone his sweetheart, June Terry (Margaret Lindsay), a real estate agent at the shore. June, jealous of Dolly, is upset when Jess informs her that he plans to shield Dolly from the reporters by hiding her at his beach cottage.

Randy Brooke (Dick Purcell), a reporter and a rival for June's affections, convinces her to play a practical joke. They take a wax model to Jess's cottage and stick a knife in the figure's throat. Jess and Dolly arrive at the cottage and are horrified to find blood stains and a body of a woman in the cellar. Hurrying to Wembley's café nearby, they telephone Capt. Baker (Thomas E. Jackson) at police headquarters. When the officers arrive, accompanied by Randy and June, the body is missing and the dummy lies in its place. Believing that it is all a publicity hoax, the police ridicule Jess as a "front page detective."

After the police leave, June admits her involvement in placing the dummy and offers to help Jess discover the identity of the murdered woman. A dress label found on the body leads them to an exclusive shop in Los Angeles, where they discover that the dress was sold to Evelyn. After an argument, Jess and June go their separate ways to solve the mystery. Upon learning that Evelyn left town to marry Moore, their investigation leads to Wembley's café. June begins to question Moore about Evelyn, whereupon he flees the café with the $50,000. His escape is aided by the sound of air raid sirens and a blackout at the beach.

By pretending to be an air raid warden, Jess corners Moore at his apartment. After Moore denies killing Evelyn and accuses Wembley of engineering the murder and hijacking the tires, Jess phones Capt. Baker, but before he can relay the information, Moore knocks him unconscious and locks him in a closet. Moore is then confronted by Wembley and his henchman, Mario (Edward Norris), who have followed him. When the police arrive, they find Moore's body, beaten to death, and accuse Jess of the crime.

After recovering from a blow to his head, Jess eludes the police and goes to the café, where he confronts Wembley and Mario with evidence of murder. In the ensuing fight, Mario and Wembley chase Jess into a banquet room where the hijacked tires are stored. The police then arrive and, seizing the tires as evidence, arrest Wembley and Mario. With the murder solved, Jess and June leave for their wedding and honeymoon.

== Cast ==
- William Gargan ... Jess Arno
- Margaret Lindsay ... June Terry
- Phyllis Brooks ... Dolly Adair
- Dick Purcell ... Randy Brooke
- Jerome Cowan ... Eddie Moore
- Edward Norris ... Mario
- James Burke ... Moriarity
- Frank M. Thomas ... Joe Wembley
- Thomas E. Jackson ... Captain Baker
- Tom Dugan ... Rawlins
- Doris Lloyd ... Mrs. Harris
- Ralph Sanford ... Hal
- Chester Clute ... Yvonne

== Production ==
The original title of the film was called Thirteen Steps to Heaven. Production took place from September 2, 1942, to September 16, 1942.
