= The Lamp of God =

1935 novella by Ellery Queen

The Lamp Of God
- First book edition
- Author: Ellery Queen
- Language: English
- Genre: Detective fiction / Whodunnit
- Publisher: Detective Story (magazine); Dell (book)
- Publication date: 1935
- Publication place: United States
- Media type: Print

The Lamp of God is a novella by Ellery Queen that was originally published in the Detective Story Magazine in 1935. Later, it was collected in the short story collection The New Adventures of Ellery Queen in 1940. Finally, it was published as a standalone book by Dell Books in 1950.

== Plot summary ==
Ellery Queen is asked by a lawyer friend to help protect the interests of a pretty young heiress. They meet her, along with an unpleasant physician who is a friend of her family, as she disembarks in New York City from an ocean liner arriving from England. She learns that her father, from whom she has been separated since her toddler years, has died just as she is to be reunited with her eccentric family and inherit her father's fabled hoard of gold. The group drives for hours to reach an ugly and sinister Victorian house called the Black House at nightfall.

The Black House, where her father died, is uninhabitable—the group meets the family and beds down in a small stone house next door. When they awake, the Black House has vanished as though it never existed. Ellery must shake off the Gothic trappings and the suggestions of black magic in order to figure out what has happened to the Black House and the gold.

== Literary significance & criticism ==
After nine popular mystery novels and the first of many movies, the character of Ellery Queen was at this point firmly established. This novella was among the first shorter fictional pieces to feature Ellery Queen. This period in the Ellery Queen canon signals a change in the type of story told, moving away from the intricate puzzle mystery format that had been a hallmark of the nine previous novels, each with a nationality in their title and a "Challenge to the Reader" immediately before the solution was revealed. Both the "nationality title" and the "Challenge to the Reader" disappear at this point in the canon.

According to the notable crime fiction critic Julian Symons, "The best of (Ellery Queen's) short stories belong to the early intensely ratiocinative period, and both The Adventures of Ellery Queen (1934) and The New Adventures of Ellery Queen (1940) are as absolutely fair and totally puzzling as the most passionate devotee of orthodoxy could wish. ... (Every) story in these books is composed with wonderful skill."

The "Dell 10¢ Book" series, of which this was #23, was a short-lived experiment by Dell Books in 1950. At 64 pages and a cover price of US10¢, this is a typical entry in the 36-title series. This novella has never again been published separately and is usually found contained in The New Adventures of Ellery Queen (1940), a collection of shorter works.

In 1946, this novella was included by the mystery writer John Dickson Carr in his list of the ten best mystery stories ever written.
