= The French Powder Mystery =

1930 novel by Ellery Queen

- First edition cover design
- Author: Ellery Queen
- Language: English
- Series: Ellery Queen mysteries
- Genre: Mystery novel / Whodunnit
- Publisher: Frederick A. Stokes (1st edition, USA); Gollancz (1st edition, UK)
- Publication date: 1930 (1st edition)
- Publication place: United States
- Media type: Print
- OCLC: 7761808
- Preceded by: The Roman Hat Mystery
- Followed by: The Dutch Shoe Mystery

The French Powder Mystery (subtitled A Problem in Deduction) is a novel that was written in 1930 by Ellery Queen. It is the second of the Ellery Queen mysteries.

== Plot summary ==
The story begins with a model in the ground-floor store window of French's Department Store in New York City who is demonstrating the features of a suite of ultra-modern furniture. When she pushes a button to reveal the folding bed, the bludgeoned corpse of the wife of the owner of the store tumbles to the floor.

The murder case falls into the hands of Inspector Richard Queen of the Homicide Squad and his mystery-writing son Ellery. A set of onyx bookends in the private apartments on the top of the store reveal not only bloodstains but grains of fingerprint powder and an unusual assortment of books. Also, an ashtray full of half-smoked cigarettes is an important clue. The suspects include the wealthy victim's family and friends, some employees of the store, and possible members of a drug ring.

At the finale of the novel, Ellery Queen performs an extended piece of deduction by creating a list of conditions that the murderer must meet (involving, among other things, the possession of keys). He clears all suspects except one, whose identity is revealed in the last line of the novel.

== Literary significance and criticism ==
This novel was the second in a long series of novels featuring Ellery Queen, the first nine containing a nationality in the title.

The introduction to this novel contained some details which are now not considered part of the Ellery Queen canon. For instance, the introduction is written as by the anonymous "J. J. McC.", a friend of the Queens, and speaks of Ellery's marriage and child, and their life in Italy, and that the names of both Ellery Queen and his father are pseudonyms — none of these circumstances survived for long.

The novel, and the other "nationality" mysteries, had the unusual feature of a "Challenge to the Reader" just before the ending is revealed — the novel breaks the fourth wall and speaks directly to the reader. "I state without reservation that the reader is at this stage in the recounting of The French Powder Mystery fully cognizant of all the facts pertinent to the discovery of the criminal; and that a sufficiently diligent study of what has gone before should educe a clear understanding of what is to come."
