= Charley Grapewin =

American circus performer and actor (1869-1956)

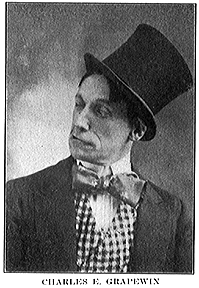
- New York Clipper, 1900
- Born: Charles Ellsworth Grapewin; December 20, 1869; Xenia, Ohio, U.S.
- Died: February 2, 1956 (aged 86); Corona, California, U.S.
- Occupations: Vaudeville performer; actor; comedian; writer; circus performer
- Years active: 1900–1956
- Spouse: Anna Chance (m. 1896; died 1943)

Charles Ellsworth Grapewin (December 20, 1869 – February 2, 1956) was an American vaudeville and circus performer, writer, and stage and film actor.

As a character actor, he worked in over one-hundred motion pictures during the silent and sound eras, mostly as a Metro-Goldwyn-Mayer contract player during the 1930s and is best known to modern audiences for portraying Uncle Henry in MGM's film adaptation of The Wizard of Oz (1939), "Grandpa" William James Joad in The Grapes of Wrath (1940), Jeeter Lester in Tobacco Road (1941), Uncle Salters in Captains Courageous (1937), Gramp Maple in The Petrified Forest (1936), Wang's Father in The Good Earth (1937), and California Joe in They Died With Their Boots On (1941).

== Biography ==
Born in Xenia, Ohio, Grapewin ran away from home to be a circus acrobat which led him to work as an aerialist and trapeze artist in a traveling circus before turning to acting. He traveled all over the world with the famous P. T. Barnum circus. Grapewin also appeared in the original 1903 Broadway production of The Wizard of Oz, 36 years before he would be featured in the famous Metro-Goldwyn-Mayer film version.

After this, Grapewin continued in theatre, on and offstage, for the next thirty years, starting with various stock companies, and wrote stage plays as a vehicle for himself. His sole Broadway theatre credit was the short-lived play It's Up to You John Henry in 1905.

Grapewin in the c. 1900 silent film Chimmie Hicks at the Races.

Grapewin began in silent films at the turn of the twentieth century. His very first films were two "moving image shorts" made by Frederick S. Armitage and released in November 1900; Chimmie Hicks at the Races (also known as Above the Limit) and Chimmie Hicks and the Rum Omelet, both shot in September and October 1900 and released in November of that year. During his long career, Grapewin appeared in more than one hundred films, including The Good Earth, The Petrified Forest, The Grapes of Wrath, Tobacco Road, and in what is probably his best-remembered role: Uncle Henry in The Wizard of Oz. Prior to being cast in that film, Grapewin performed in Metro-Goldwyn-Mayer's Broadway Melody of 1938 with Judy Garland (Dorothy in Oz) and Buddy Ebsen (the original Tin Man in Oz). He also performed with Garland in Listen, Darling. Later, in the early 1940s, he had a recurring role as Inspector Queen in the Ellery Queen film series.

== Personal life ==
Grapewin married actress Anna Chance in 1896, and they remained together until her death in 1943.

== Selected filmography ==
- The Shannons of Broadway (1929) as Swanzey (film debut)
- Only Saps Work (1930) as Simeon Tanner
- The Millionaire (1931) as Ed Powers
- Gold Dust Gertie (1931) as Nicholas Hautrey
- Heaven on Earth (1931) as Doc Boax
- Hell's House (1932) as Henry Clark
- The Big Timer (1932) as Pop Baldwin
- Disorderly Conduct (1932) as Limpy
- Are You Listening? (1932) as Pierce (uncredited)
- Huddle (1932) as Doctor (uncredited)
- The Woman in Room 13 (1932) as Andy
- The Washington Masquerade (1932) as Senator Simmons (uncredited)
- Lady and Gent (1932) as Grocer
- American Madness (1932) as Mr. Jones (uncredited)
- The Night of June 13 (1932) as "Grandpop" Jeptha Strawn
- Wild Horse Mesa (1932) as Sam Bass
- No Man of Her Own (1932) as George, the Clerk
- Hello, Everybody! (1933) as Jed
- The Kiss Before the Mirror (1933) as Schultz
- Heroes for Sale (1933) as Pa Dennis
- Midnight Mary (1933) as Clerk
- Don't Bet on Love (1933) as Pop McCaffery
- Pilgrimage (1933) as Dad Saunders
- Turn Back the Clock (1933) as Dr. Henderson (uncredited)
- Beauty for Sale (1933) as Freddy Gordon
- Torch Singer (1933) as Judson
- Wild Boys of the Road (1933) as Mr. Cadman (uncredited)
- Female (1933) as Drunk at Hamburger Stand (uncredited)
- Hell and High Water (1933) as Peck Wealin
- Two Alone (1934) as Sandy Roberts
- Caravan (1934) as Notary
- The Quitter (1934) as Ed Tilford
- She Made Her Bed (1934) as Joe Olesen
- The Loudspeaker (1934) as Pop Calloway
- Return of the Terror (1934) as Jessup
- Judge Priest (1934) as Sergeant Jimmy Bagby
- The President Vanishes (1934) as Richard Norton
- Anne of Green Gables (1934) as Dr. Tatum
- In Spite of Danger (1935) as Pop Sullivan
- Eight Bells (1935) as Grayson
- Party Wire (1935) as Will Oliver
- One Frightened Night (1935) as Jasper Whyte
- Shanghai (1935) as Truesdale
- Alice Adams (1935) as J. A. Lamb
- King Solomon of Broadway (1935) as Uncle Winchester
- Rendezvous (1935) as Martin
- Super Speed (1935) as Terry Devlin
- Ah, Wilderness! (1935) as Dave McComber
- The Petrified Forest (1936) as Gramp Maple
- The Voice of Bugle Ann (1936) as Cal Royster
- Small Town Girl (1936) as Dr. Ned Fabre
- Libeled Lady (1936) as Mr. Bane
- Without Orders (1936) as J.P. Kendrick
- Sinner Take All (1936) as Aaron
- The Good Earth (1937) as Old Father
- A Family Affair (1937) as Frank Redmond
- Captains Courageous (1937) as Uncle Salters
- Between Two Women (1937) as Dr. Webster
- Broadway Melody of 1938 (1937) as James K. Blakeley
- Bad Guy (1937) as Dan Gray
- Big City (1937) as The Mayor
- The Bad Man of Brimstone (1937) as Barney Lane
- Of Human Hearts (1938) as Jim Meeker
- The Girl of the Golden West (1938) as Uncle Davy
- Three Comrades (1938) as Local Doctor
- Three Loves Has Nancy (1938) as Grandpa Briggs
- Listen, Darling (1938) as Uncle Joe
- Artists and Models Abroad (1938) as James Harper
- Stand Up and Fight (1939) as 'Old Puff'
- Burn 'Em Up O'Connor (1939) as 'Doc' Heath
- Sudden Money (1939) as Grandpa Casey Patterson
- The Man Who Dared (1939) as Ulysses Porterfield
- The Wizard of Oz (1939) as Uncle Henry
- Dust Be My Destiny (1939) as Pop
- Hero for a Day (1939) as Uncle Frank 'Lucky' Higgins
- Sabotage (1939) as Major Matt Grayson
- The Grapes of Wrath (1940) as William James "Grandpa" Joad
- Johnny Apollo (1940) as Judge Emmett T. Brennan
- Earthbound (1940) as Mr. Whimser
- Rhythm on the River (1940) as Uncle Caleb
- Ellery Queen, Master Detective (1940) as Insp. Queen
- Texas Rangers Ride Again (1940) as Ranger Ben Caldwalder
- Tobacco Road (1941) as Jeeter
- Ellery Queen's Penthouse Mystery (1941) as Inspector Richard Queen
- Ellery Queen and the Perfect Crime (1941) as Insp. Queen
- Ellery Queen and the Murder Ring (1941) as Insp. Queen
- They Died with Their Boots On (1941) as California Joe
- A Close Call for Ellery Queen (1942) as Inspector Queen
- A Desperate Chance for Ellery Queen (1942) as Insp. Queen
- Enemy Agents Meet Ellery Queen (1942) as Inspector Richard Queen
- Crash Dive (1943) as Pop (uncredited)
- Follow the Boys (1944) as Nick West
- Atlantic City (1944) as Jake Taylor
- The Impatient Years (1944) as Benjamin L. Pidgeon, Bellboy
- Gunfighters (1947) as Inskip - Rancher
- The Enchanted Valley (1948) as Grandpa
- Sand (1949) as Doug
- When I Grow Up (1951) as Grandpa Reed (final film role)
