= The Devil to Pay (Ellery Queen novel) =

1938 novel by Ellery Queen

- First US edition
- Author: Ellery Queen
- Language: English
- Series: Ellery Queen mysteries
- Genre: Mystery / Whodunnit
- Publisher: Stokes (US); Gollancz (UK)
- Publication date: 1938
- Publication place: United States
- Media type: Print
- Pages: 303
- Preceded by: The Door Between
- Followed by: The Four of Hearts

The Devil To Pay is an American mystery novel published in 1938, written by Ellery Queen. The book was first published in condensed form in the December 1937 issue of Cosmopolitan. It is primarily set in Los Angeles, United States. The 1941 film Ellery Queen and the Perfect Crime was loosely based on this novel.

== Plot summary ==
Solly Spaeth is a financier whose machinations with the "Ohippi Hydro-Electric Project" have left a number of people much less wealthy than once they were, including his business partner, Rhys Jardin. Jardin's beautiful daughter Valerie is involved with Spaeth's son Walter. Rhys is so impoverished, he has to sell up his personal property at auction, much to the dismay of his daughter and his long-time servant/valet/trainer, Pink. Walter asks Ellery Queen to sit in on the auction and buy every lot, which is how Ellery becomes involved when Solly Spaeth is found pierced by an ancient sword whose blade has been coated with molasses and cyanide. Suspicion falls on a number of people, including the Jardin household, Solly's son, lawyer and his mistress, the kooky Winni Moon, but Ellery works through alibis and motives and traces the crime back to the murderer. A sub-plot of the novel is that Ellery has been hired to work on a screenplay and has been completely idle for weeks because he cannot get in to see studio head Jacques Butcher; Butcher plays a much more prominent role in the next novel, The Four of Hearts.

== Literary significance and criticism ==
This period in the Ellery Queen canon signals a change in the type of story told, moving away from the puzzle mystery format which had been a hallmark of earlier novels, and takes him to Hollywood, where he becomes involved with both screenwriting and romance. According to website QBI: "It's fair to say that the Hollywood novels made a pleasant read, but nothing more. ... The first of the Hollywood EQs, and the first to have vaguely political overtones."
