= Margaret Lindsay =

American actress (1910–1981)

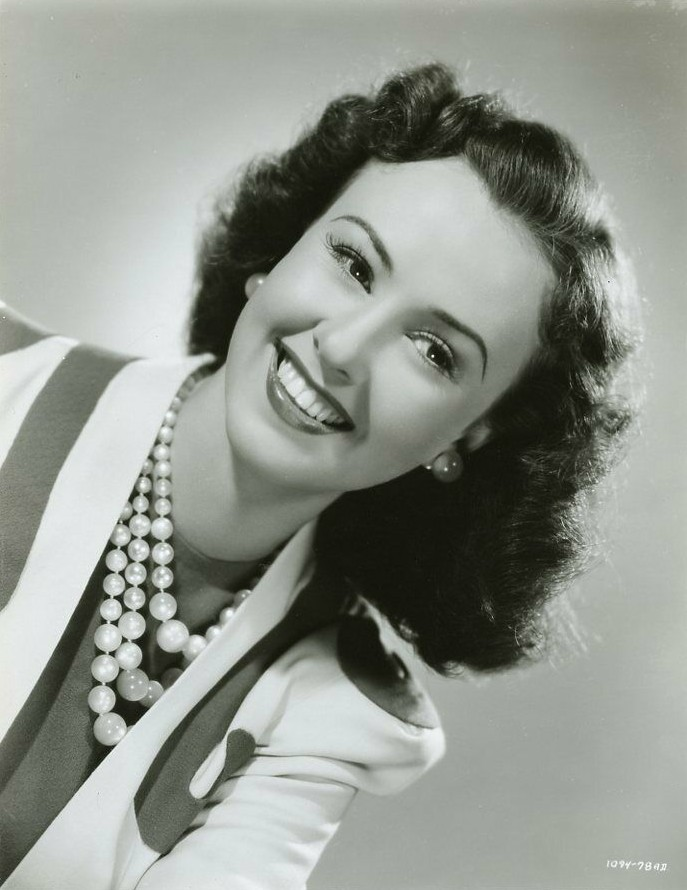
- Lindsay in the 1930s
- Born: Margaret Lindsay Kies; September 19, 1910; Dubuque, Iowa, U.S.
- Died: May 9, 1981 (aged 70); Los Angeles, California, U.S.
- Resting place: Holy Cross Cemetery, Culver City, California
- Occupation: Actress
- Years active: 1932–1974
- Known for: The House of the Seven Gables; Baby Face; Jezebel
- Partner: Mary McCarty
- Relatives: Jane Gilbert (sister)

Margaret Lindsay (born Margaret Kies; September 19, 1910 – May 9, 1981) was an American film actress. Her time as a Warner Bros. contract player during the 1930s was particularly productive. She was noted for her supporting work in successful films of the 1930s and 1940s such as Baby Face, Jezebel (1938) and Scarlet Street (1945) and her leading roles in lower-budgeted B movie films such as the Ellery Queen series at Columbia in the early 1940s. Critics regard her portrayal of Nathaniel Hawthorne's Hepzibah Pyncheon in the 1940 film The House of the Seven Gables as Lindsay's standout career role.

== Early life ==
Margaret Kies (pronounced "keys") was born in Dubuque, Iowa, the eldest of six children of a pharmacist father who died in 1930. According to Tom Longden of the Des Moines Register, "Peg" was "a tomboy who liked to climb pear trees" and was a "roller-skating fiend". She graduated in 1930 from Visitation Academy in Dubuque. Her 1945 resumé lists her academic credentials as National Park Seminary in Washington, D. C. and the American Academy of Dramatic Art (where one of her classmates was Robert Cummings).

== Career ==
=== 1930s ===
Lindsay began her theatrical career on stage in two hit plays, Death Takes a Holiday and By Candlelight. Her friend Bob Cummings couldn't find work in pictures because casting directors were looking for English juveniles. Cummings then posed as the Englishman "Blade Stanhope Conway" and, as columnist S. R. Mook reported in 1936, "got more work than he could take care of. It was also Bob who, meeting Margaret Lindsay who had been in his class at the dramatic school, suggested to her (when she told him she couldn't find work) that she follow his example. She did." Margaret Kies became "British actress" Margaret Lindsay.

She impressed Universal Studios enough to sign her for their 1932 version of The Old Dark House. As James Robert Parish and William T. Leonard wrote in Hollywood Players: The Thirties (Arlington House, 1976), Lindsay returned to America and arrived in Hollywood, only to discover that Gloria Stuart had been cast in her role in the film. After some minor roles in pre-Code films such as Christopher Strong and the groundbreaking Baby Face, which starred Barbara Stanwyck, Lindsay was cast in the Fox Film Corporation's award-winning Cavalcade. Lindsay was selected for a role as Edith Harris, a doomed English bride whose honeymoon takes place on the Titanic.

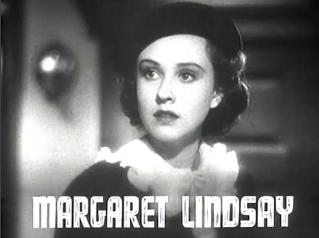
Lindsay in Public Enemy's Wife (1936)

Lindsay signed a five-year contract with Warner Bros., playing leads in both major and minor features, including G Men (1935) opposite James Cagney and Garden of the Moon (1938) opposite Pat O'Brien. Lindsay co-starred with Bette Davis in four Warners films: as Davis's sister in Fog Over Frisco (1934); in Dangerous (1935), for which Davis won her first Best Actress Academy Award; in Bordertown with Paul Muni, and as Davis's rival for Henry Fonda's affections in Jezebel (1938).

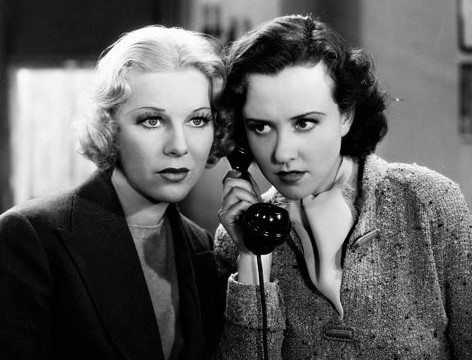
Glenda Farrell (left) and Lindsay (right) in The Law in Her Hands (1936)

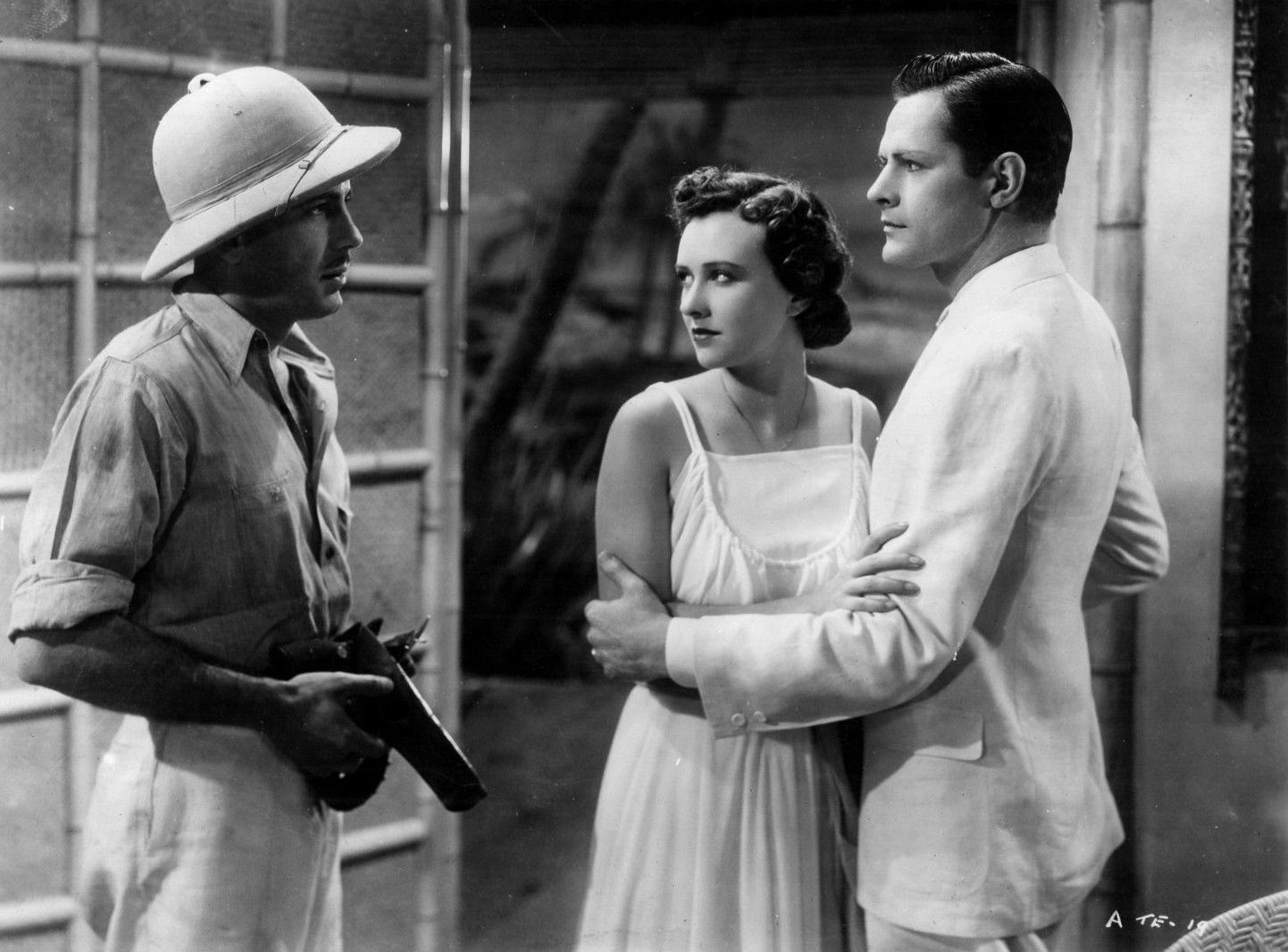
Humphrey Bogart, Margaret Lindsay & Donald Woods in American adventure film Isle of Fury (1936)

After her tenure at Warners, she went to Universal where her old friend Bob Cummings had the juvenile lead in adolescent singing star Gloria Jean's first picture, The Under-Pup (1939). Cummings reunited with Lindsay, who played a supporting role.

=== 1940s ===
Michael Brunas, John Brunas, and Tom Weaver wrote in Universal Horrors: The Studio's Classic Films, 1931–46 that Lindsay, "one of the more talented '30s leading ladies, contributes a mature performance that might be the best, certainly the most striking in [The House of the Seven Gables]."

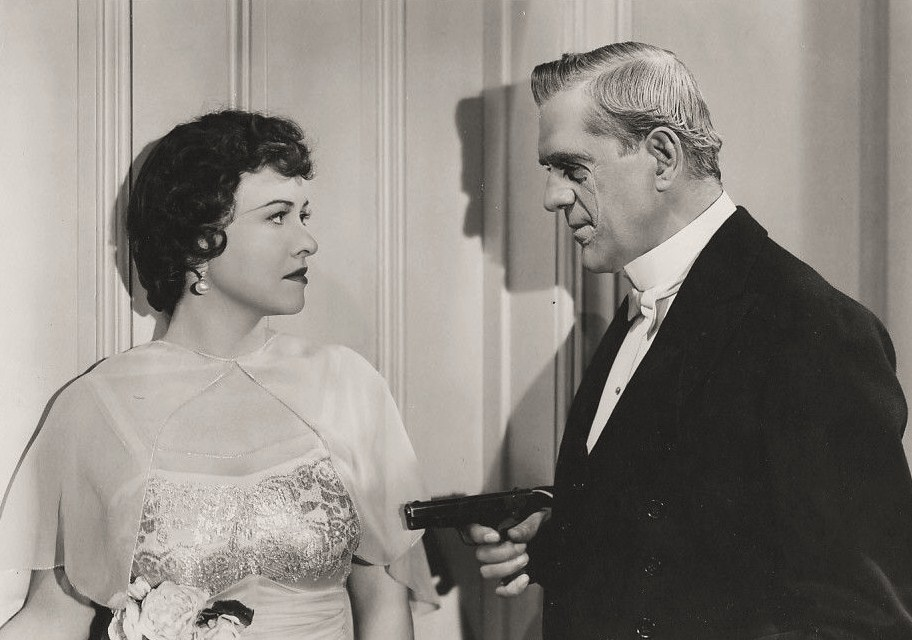
Lindsay with Boris Karloff in British Intelligence (1940)

Her 1940s film work in Hollywood included Columbia Pictures's first entry in their Crime Doctor series, as well as her continuing role as Nikki Porter in Columbia's Ellery Queen series (1940–1942).

Lindsay appeared in a supporting role in the 1942 film The Spoilers. After Universal Pictures released her from her contract, she returned to the stage, appearing on Broadway in Another Love Story, which had a three-month run at the end of 1943. Disappointed, she went back to Hollywood, but her film career went into temporary decline, with roles mostly in films at low-budget studios like Monogram Pictures and PRC. She returned to bigger film work in 1947, featured in MGM films like Cass Timberlane with Spencer Tracy and Lana Turner. She again returned to the stage and co-starred with Franchot Tone in The Second Man.

=== 1950s and 1960s ===
She made her television debut in 1950 in The Importance of Being Earnest, which allowed her to display her finely honed British accent. More television work followed. Lindsay appeared in only four films during the 1950s and two in the 1960s. Her final feature film was Tammy and the Doctor (1963).

== Personal life ==
Early in her career, Lindsay lived with her sister Helen in Hollywood, Los Angeles. Later in life, she lived with her youngest sister Mickie. She never married.

According to biographer and historian William J. Mann, Lindsay was the life partner of actor Mary McCarty. Her dating companions included other reportedly gay stars like Cesar Romero, Richard Deacon, and Liberace. She was also linked romantically to Janet Gaynor.

== Death ==
Lindsay died at the age of 70 of emphysema in 1981 at the Good Samaritan Hospital in Los Angeles. She was buried at Holy Cross Cemetery, Culver City, California.

== Family ==
Lindsay's sister, Jane Kies, was also an actress under the stage name Jane Gilbert.

== Complete filmography ==
Year	Title	Role	Notes
1932	Okay, America!	Ruth Drake	
1932	The Fourth Horseman	Molly O'Rourke	
1932	The All American	Miss Bowen	
1932	Once in a Lifetime	Dr. Lewis' Secretary	
1933	Cavalcade	Edith Harris	
1933	West of Singapore	Shelby Worrell	
1933	Christopher Strong	Autograph Seeker at Party	Uncredited
1933	Private Detective 62	Janet	
1933	Baby Face	Ann Carter	
1933	Voltaire	Nanette	
1933	Captured!	Monica A. Allison	
1933	Paddy the Next Best Thing	Eileen Adair	
1933	From Headquarters	Lou Winton	
1933	The World Changes	Jennifer Clinton Nordholm	
1933	The House on 56th Street	Eleanor Van Tyle Burgess	
1933	Lady Killer	Lois Underwood	
1934	Merry Wives of Reno	Madge	
1934	Fog Over Frisco	Valkyr Bradford	
1934	The Dragon Murder Case	Bernice	
1934	Gentlemen Are Born	Joan Harper	
1935	Bordertown	Dale Elwell	
1935	Devil Dogs of the Air	Betty Roberts	
1935	The Florentine Dagger	Florence	
1935	The Case of the Curious Bride	Rhoda Montaine	
1935	G Men	Kay McCord	
1935	Personal Maid's Secret	Joan	
1935	Frisco Kid	Jean Barrat	
1935	Dangerous	Gail Armitage	
1936	The Lady Consents	Gerry Mannerly	
1936	The Law in Her Hands	Mary Wentworth	
1936	Public Enemy's Wife	Judith Roberts Maroc	
1936	Isle of Fury	Lucille Gordon	
1936	Sinner Take All	Lorraine	
1937	Green Light	Frances Ogilvie	
1937	Song of the City	Angelina Romandi	
1937	Slim	Cally	
1937	Back in Circulation	Arline Wade	
1938	Breakdowns of 1938	Short subject	gag reel, unreleased
1938	Gold is Where You Find It	Rosanne	
1938	Jezebel	Amy Bradford Dillard	
1938	When Were You Born	Doris Kane (Leo)	
1938	Garden of the Moon	Toni Blake	
1938	Broadway Musketeers	Isabel 'Isabelle' Dowling Peyton	
1938	There's That Woman Again	Mrs. Nacelle	
1939	On Trial	Mae Strickland	
1939	Hell's Kitchen	Beth	
1939	The Under-Pup	Mrs. Cooper	
1939	20,000 Men a Year	Ann Rogers	
1940	British Intelligence	Helene von Lorbeer	
1940	Honeymoon Deferred	Janet Payne Farradene	
1940	The House of the Seven Gables	Hepzibah Pyncheon	
1940	Double Alibi	Sue Casey	
1940	Meet the Wildcat	Ann Larkin	
1940	Ellery Queen, Master Detective	Nikki Porter	
1941	Ellery Queen's Penthouse Mystery	Nikki Porter	
1941	The Hard-Boiled Canary	Sylvia Worth	
1941	Ellery Queen and the Perfect Crime	Nikki Porter	
1941	Ellery Queen and the Murder Ring	Nikki Porter	
1942	A Close Call for Ellery Queen	Nikki Porter	
1942	A Tragedy at Midnight	Beth Sherman	
1942	A Desperate Chance for Ellery Queen	Nikki Porter	
1942	The Spoilers	Helen Chester	
1942	Enemy Agents Meet Ellery Queen	Nikki Porter	
1943	No Place for a Lady	June Terry	
1943	Let's Have Fun	Florence Blake	
1943	Crime Doctor	Grace Fielding	
1944	Alaska	Roxie Reagan	
1945	Adventures of Rusty	Ann Mitchell	
1945	Club Havana	Rosalind	
1945	Scarlet Street	Millie Ray	
1946	Her Sister's Secret	Renee DuBois Gordon	
1947	The Vigilantes Return	Kitty	
1947	Seven Keys to Baldpate	Connie Lane	
1947	Louisiana	Alvern Adams	
1947	Cass Timberlane	Chris Grau	
1948	B.F.'s Daughter	'Apples' Sanler	
1956	The Bottom of the Bottle	Hannah Cady	
1956	Emergency Hospital	Dr. Janet Carey	
1958	The Restless Years	Dorothy Henderson	
1959	Jet Over the Atlantic	Mrs. Lanyard	
1960	Please Don't Eat the Daisies	Mona James	
1963	Tammy and the Doctor	Rachel Colman, Head Nurse	
1974	The Chadwick Family	Elly	TV Movie
