= The Egyptian Cross Mystery =

1932 novel by Ellery Queen

- First US edition cover design
- Author: Ellery Queen
- Language: English
- Series: Ellery Queen mysteries
- Genre: Mystery novel / Whodunnit
- Publisher: Stokes (USA); Gollancz (UK)
- Publication date: 1932
- Publication place: United States
- Media type: Print
- ISBN: 0-451-08663-5
- OCLC: 7263819
- Preceded by: The Greek Coffin Mystery
- Followed by: The American Gun Mystery

The Egyptian Cross Mystery (subtitled A Problem in Deduction) is a novel that was written in 1932 by Ellery Queen. It is the fifth of the Ellery Queen mysteries.

== Plot summary ==
A schoolmaster in a tiny town in West Virginia is found on Christmas morning beheaded and crucified to a signpost in such a way that his body seems to form the letter "T". The letter "T" is scrawled in blood on the dead man's door. Ellery Queen is on the scene and notes that the letter "T" is also the shape of a "tau cross", or Egyptian cross; this seems to lead to a nearby bearded prophet whose invented religion mixes nudism and Egyptology.

The prophet's business manager is missing and suspected of the murder. Ellery cannot solve the crime with the little information he has, but six months later in Long Island, New York, a neighbour of one of his university professors is found headless and crucified to a totem pole in the same way, in the new neighbourhood of the Egyptian prophet and his followers. This corpse is clutching a red piece from a game of checkers. The third victim is a millionaire yachtsman, similarly crucified.

Many events turn on the families of the victims and their interaction with the Egyptian nudists, the game of checkers and the smoking of unusually-carved pipes, but the key clue that leads Ellery to the solution is a bottle of iodine that enables him to go on a cross-country chase and hunt down the murderer.

== Literary significance and criticism ==
(See Ellery Queen.) This novel was the fifth in a long series of novels featuring Ellery Queen, the first nine containing a nationality in the title.

The introduction to this novel contained a detail which is now not considered part of the Ellery Queen canon. The introduction is written as by the anonymous "J.J. McC.", a friend of the Queens. Other details of the lives of the fictional Queen family contained in earlier introductions have now disappeared and are never mentioned again; the introductory device of "J.J. McC." lasts only through the tenth novel, Halfway House, then vanishes (though J.J. appears onstage in Face to Face in 1967).

This novel is the first to feature Ellery Queen investigating a murder alone, outside New York City, and without the assistance of his father, Inspector Richard Queen of the Homicide Squad.

The novel, and the other "nationality" mysteries, had the unusual feature of a "Challenge to the Reader" just before the ending is revealed—the novel breaks the fourth wall and speaks directly to the reader. "It has been my custom to challenge the reader's wits at such point in my novels at which the reader is in possession of all facts necessary to a correct solution of the crime or crimes. The Egyptian Cross Mystery is no exception: by the exercise of strict logic and deductions from given data, you should now be able, not merely to guess, but to prove the identity of the culprit."
