= Ellery Queen and the Perfect Crime =

1941 film by James P. Hogan

- Theatrical release poster
- Directed by: James P. Hogan
- Screenplay by: Eric Taylor
- Story by: Ellery Queen
- Based on: The Devil to Pay
- Produced by: Larry Darmour
- Starring: Ralph Bellamy; Margaret Lindsay; Charley Grapewin; Spring Byington; H. B. Warner; James Burke
- Cinematography: James S. Brown Jr.
- Edited by: Dwight Caldwell
- Music by: Lee Zahler
- Production company: Larry Darmour Productions
- Distributed by: Columbia Pictures
- Release date: August 14, 1941
- Running time: 67 minutes
- Country: United States
- Language: English

Ellery Queen and the Perfect Crime is a 1941 American mystery film directed by James P. Hogan and written by Eric Taylor. The film was loosely based on the 1938 novel The Devil to Pay by Ellery Queen. It stars Ralph Bellamy, Margaret Lindsay, Charley Grapewin, Spring Byington, H. B. Warner and James Burke. The film was released on August 14, 1941, by Columbia Pictures.

== Cast ==
- Ralph Bellamy as Ellery Queen
- Margaret Lindsay as Nikki Porter
- Charley Grapewin as Inspector Queen
- Spring Byington as Carlotta Emerson
- H. B. Warner as Ray Jardin
- James Burke as Sgt. Velie
- Douglass Dumbrille as John Matthews
- John Beal as Walter Matthews
- Linda Hayes as Marian Jardin
- Sidney Blackmer as Anthony Rhodes
- Walter Kingsford as Henry
- Honorable Wu as Lee
- Charles Lane as Dr. Prouty
- Charles Halton as Rufus Smith
- Arthur Q. Bryan as Book Salesman
