= Kill As Directed =

1963 thriller novel by Henry Kane

First edition (publ. Pocket Books)

Kill As Directed is a 1963 thriller novel ghostwritten by the writer Henry Kane under the pseudonym Ellery Queen.

== Plot summary ==
Harrison Brown is a young doctor who is a couple of years removed from medical school and has gone through his father's modest inheritance trying to set up his private practice. An old friend, Tony Mitchell, who was a lawyer that had a casual professional relationship with Brown's father, visits him one day and after catching up offers to co-sign a loan to help Brown get his private practice off the ground. He also offers to send some clients Brown's way. Kurt and Karen Gresham are two such clients. Kurt is an older man, over twice Karen's age, and Karen is a young beauty. A social relationship between the four takes them out of the medical office, and Brown soon starts an affair with Karen, who he suspects correctly is also having an affair with Tony.

One evening, Kurt shows up at Brown's office with a young woman who has a gunshot wound. Brown fixes it up, but Kurt tells him to not report the incident. A short time later, Brown goes out to dinner with Tony and Karen and arrives home to find a dead woman in his apartment. He had never met her, but soon suspects Kurt is tied up with this. The woman had, according to Kurt, committed suicide via heroin overdose and was placed in Brown's apartment to show Brown what Kurt was capable of. It is at this time that Kurt reveals he is a heroin dealer and compels Brown, under duress, to serve as his doctor whenever his business requires a doctor who will not report an incident to authorities. To further entice Brown to agree, Kurt pays off the $30,000 loan Brown took out, and gives him an additional $25,000.

Both men, though, are being manipulated by Tony and Karen. Karen reveals to Brown that she wants to marry him and plants the idea in Brown's head that Kurt must be killed in order to preserve their safety. He agrees to do this, but when he arrives to kill Kurt at the hotel where Kurt is staying, Brown is unable to pull the trigger. The hotel's security arrives, claiming that he had received a call that shots had been fired, though they hadn't. Karen had placed the call, planning on Kurt being killed and Brown being arrested so that she would be free to marry Tony.

Both Kurt and Brown return to Kurt's home and hide out, waiting for Tony and Karen to arrive home. Once their conversation has confirmed Kurt's suspicions, Kurt shoots and kills both, adding second shots to each of their heads. He then turns the gun on Brown, who tackles Kurt. Kurt has a heart attack and dies. Afterward Brown calls the police and confesses the entire story, but police press do not charges as he is able to help them bring down the international drug ring with which Kurt was working.
