= The Roman Hat Mystery =

1929 novel by Ellery Queen

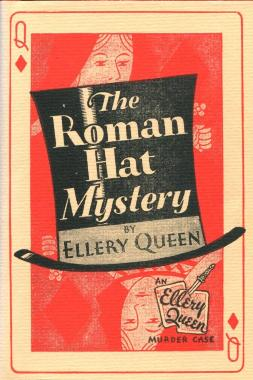
- First edition cover (US)
- Author: Ellery Queen
- Language: English
- Series: Ellery Queen mysteries
- Genre: Mystery novel / Whodunnit
- Publisher: Frederick A. Stokes (1st edition, USA); Gollancz (1st edition, UK)
- Publication date: August 15th 1929 (1st US edition)
- Publication place: United States
- Media type: Print
- OCLC: 5220723
- Followed by: The French Powder Mystery

The Roman Hat Mystery (subtitled A Problem in Deduction) is a novel that was written in 1928 and published in 1929 by Ellery Queen. It is the first of the Ellery Queen mysteries.

== Plot summary ==
The novel deals with the poisoning of a disreputable lawyer named Monte Field in the Roman Theater in New York City during a performance of a play called "Gunplay!" Although the play is a sold-out hit, the corpse is discovered seated surrounded by empty seats. A number of suspects whose pasts had made them potentially susceptible to blackmail are in the theater at the time, some connected with the Roman Theater and some audience members.

The case is investigated by Inspector Richard Queen of the Homicide Squad with the assistance of his son Ellery, a bibliophile and author. The principal clue in the mystery is the disappearance of the victim's top hat, and it is suspected that the hat may have contained papers with which the victim was blackmailing the murderer. A number of suspects are considered, but nothing can be proved until Ellery performs an extended piece of logical deduction based on the missing hat and thus identifies the murderer.

== Literary significance & criticism ==
(See Ellery Queen.) The character of Ellery Queen and the more-or-less locked room mystery format were probably suggested by the novels featuring detective Philo Vance by S.S. Van Dine, which were very popular at the time. The novel was written as an entry in a literary contest, which it won, but the sponsoring organization folded before the prize was awarded. This novel began a long series of novels featuring Ellery Queen, the first nine containing a nationality in the title.

In the foreword is written: "Grateful acknowledgment is made to Professor Alexander Goettler Chief Toxicologist of the City of New York for his friendly offices in the preparation of this tale."

The introduction to this novel contained some details which are now not considered part of the Ellery Queen canon. For instance, the introduction is written as by the anonymous "J.J. McC.", a friend of the Queens, and speaks of Ellery's marriage and child, and their life in Italy, and that the names of both Ellery Queen and his father are pseudonyms—none of these circumstances survived for long, although a Judge J.J. McCue appears in one of the final novels, Face to Face. The introduction also speaks of the "Barnaby Ross murder case", which not only does not exist but prefigures the pseudonym adopted by Ellery Queen the author for another series of books, the Drury Lane (fictional detective) mysteries as by Barnaby Ross.

The novel, and the other "nationality" mysteries, had the unusual feature of a "Challenge to the Reader" just before the ending is revealed—the novel breaks the fourth wall and speaks directly to the reader. "The alert student of mystery tales, now being in possession of all the pertinent facts, should at this stage of the story have reached definite conclusions on the questions propounded. The solution -- or enough of it to point unerringly to the guilty character -- may be reached by a series of logical deductions and psychological observations."

"A landmark rather than a cornerstone, perhaps ... Though the egregious bonhomie of the Queens and Ellery's pseudo bookishness occasionally irritate, the neatness of the plot involving a missing hat in a theater murder cannot be denied. But the police procedure is not what it would be now, and the criminal's luck in carrying out his complex plan strains the believables."
