= Halfway House (novel) =

1936 novel by Ellery Queen

- First US edition
- Author: Ellery Queen
- Language: English
- Series: Ellery Queen mysteries
- Genre: Mystery novel / Whodunnit
- Publisher: Stokes (US); Gollancz (UK)
- Publication date: 1936
- Publication place: United States
- Media type: Print
- Preceded by: The Spanish Cape Mystery
- Followed by: The Door Between

Halfway House (subtitled A Problem in Deduction) is a novel that was written in 1936 by Ellery Queen. It is a mystery novel primarily set in New Jersey, United States. The book was first published in condensed form in the June 1936 issue of Cosmopolitan.

== Plot summary ==
Joe Wilson was a poor, itinerant salesman with a pretty young wife in Philadelphia. Joseph Kent Gimball was a wealthy, socially prominent New Yorker with an elegant and aristocratic wife. These two very different men were actually the same man, a bigamist leading a bizarre double life. His deception was revealed to the world after he was murdered in his "halfway house," a riverfront shack outside Trenton, New Jersey, that he used as a hideout to switch identities.

Ellery Queen, who is drawn into the investigation to help old friends, is able to look beyond the strange nature of the victim to seek hard facts. He puts his finger on the central question: "Who was murdered -- Joe or Joseph?" Queen performs an extended feat of logical deduction from seemingly insignificant clues, such as a number of burnt matches, and finally develops a profile of the killer that can fit only one person in the case.

== Literary significance & criticism ==
(See Ellery Queen.) This period in the Ellery Queen canon signals a change in the type of story told, moving away from the intricate puzzle mystery format which had been a hallmark of the nine previous novels, each with a nationality in their title and a "Challenge to the Reader" immediately before the solution was revealed. "Halfway House" is the last novel wherein Queen issues his "Challenge," and it is the first without a "nationality title," although it is remarked in the foreword that the story could have been called The Swedish Match Mystery. "(Ellery Queen) gave up the Challenge and the close analysis of clues, and made Ellery a less omniscient and more human figure, in search of a wider significance and more interesting characterization. ... (The) first ten books represent a peak point in the history of the detective story between the wars."
