= The Spanish Cape Mystery =

1935 novel by Ellery Queen

- First edition
- Author: Ellery Queen
- Language: English
- Series: Ellery Queen mysteries
- Genre: Mystery novel / Whodunnit
- Publisher: Stokes (US); Gollancz (UK)
- Publication date: 1935
- Publication place: United States
- Media type: Print
- OCLC: 4414051
- Preceded by: The Chinese Orange Mystery
- Followed by: Halfway House

The Spanish Cape Mystery (subtitled A Problem in Deduction) is a novel that was written by Ellery Queen as the ninth book of the Ellery Queen mysteries. Published in April in hardcover by Frederick A. Stokes, it also appeared as a "complete, book-length novel" in the April 1935 issue of Redbook.

== Plot summary ==
The story begins with a pretty young heiress and her uncle seated outside their summer home on Spanish Cape, escaping the guests at her parents' house party. Suddenly a one-eyed giant bursts onto the scene and kidnaps them, misidentifying the uncle as John Marco, a house guest. The giant removes them both, ties the heiress to a chair in an empty neighbouring home, and disappears with the uncle. Ellery Queen and a friend arrive at the neighbouring home in the morning and release the heiress, but by the time they can return her to her home, Marco has been found on the terrace, strangled, and nude except for an enveloping opera cape.

The house party and the household contain many people who had good reason to want the victim out of the way, some because he was blackmailing them. As Ellery is investigating the crime, another household member commits suicide out of sheer desperation at the potential revelation of a dreaded secret. By the time the uncle escapes his captor and swims to shore, Ellery is ready to reveal the identity of the murderer and the reason for the victim's nudity in a dramatic final scene.

== Literary significance and criticism ==
(See Ellery Queen.)

This novel was the ninth in a long series of novels featuring Ellery Queen, and the last to contain a nationality in the title. The introduction to this novel contained a detail which is now not considered part of the Ellery Queen canon. The introduction is written as by the anonymous "J.J. McC.", a friend of the Queens. Other details of the lives of the fictional Queen family contained in earlier introductions have now disappeared and are never mentioned again. The introductory device of "J.J. McC." disappears after the novel following this one, Halfway House—though a character named "J.J.," a "Judge McCue," appears as a friend of the Queens in the much later novel Face to Face.

The "nationality" mysteries had the unusual feature of a "Challenge to the Reader" just before the ending is revealed—the novel breaks the fourth wall and speaks directly to the reader. This is the final instance of the challenge. "For years now I have been challenging my readers to solve my cases by the exercise of close observation, the application of logic to the winnowed facts, and a final correlation of the individual conclusions... Technically there are no snags. The facts are all here at this point... Can you put them together and logically place your finger on the one and only possible murderer?"

"A fair example of the chat and comment that enliven the Queen cases for some and make them a trifle too rich for others."

== Film, TV or theatrical adaptations ==
This was the first novel from which an Ellery Queen film was made, and in the same year as its publication. The 1935 film The Spanish Cape Mystery, with Donald Cook as Ellery Queen and Guy Usher as Inspector Queen, was only moderately faithful to the book. It eliminated the nudity angle, with the murder victim found wearing swim trunks under his cape.
