= The Greek Coffin Mystery =

1932 novel by Ellery Queen

- First edition
- Author: Ellery Queen
- Language: English
- Series: Ellery Queen mysteries
- Genre: Mystery novel / Whodunnit
- Publisher: Frederick A. Stokes (US); Gollancz (UK)
- Publication date: 1932
- Publication place: United States
- Media type: Print; First paperback edition Pocket Books #179, 1942
- OCLC: 5472784
- Preceded by: The Dutch Shoe Mystery
- Followed by: The Egyptian Cross Mystery

The Greek Coffin Mystery (subtitled A Problem in Deduction) is a 1932 novel by Ellery Queen. It is the fourth of the Ellery Queen mysteries.

== Plot summary ==
After the death of an elderly Greek man who is an internationally famous art dealer and collector, his attorney discovers that his will is missing and notifies the district attorney. When Inspector Richard Queen of the New York City Police Force's Homicide Squad and his amateur detective son Ellery are called in, Ellery narrows down the possible location of the will to a single location: the dead man's coffin. When it is exhumed, however, it contains no will but the surprising addition of a strangled ex-convict.

Ellery performs an extended piece of deduction in public early on in the novel that concerns several used teacups, and is proved wrong. Stung by this embarrassing error, he keeps his deductions to himself for the remainder of the case. Subsequent clues involve color-blindness, a shred of the burned will, two copies of a Leonardo da Vinci painting differing only in skin tone, a thousand-dollar bill, a dead art dealer whose office door was either open or closed and, most importantly, an infinitesimal typing error.

Ellery and his father lay a trap, unmasking the murderer— whose guilt will probably have been entirely unsuspected by most readers.

== Literary significance and criticism ==
This novel was the fourth in a long series of novels featuring Ellery Queen, the first nine containing a nationality in the title.

The introduction to this novel contained some details which are now not considered part of the Ellery Queen canon. For instance, the introduction is written as by the anonymous "J.J. McC.", a friend of the Queens, speaks of the Queens having retired to Italy, and that the names of both Ellery Queen and his father are pseudonyms—none of these circumstances survived for long.

The names of the chapters, each a single word, contain an acrostic which spells out "The Greek Coffin Mystery by Ellery Queen".

This novel begins a tradition in the series of Ellery Queen novels. Because Ellery is publicly embarrassed by his initial error in deduction with respect to the teacups, he will never reveal any of his thoughts about this or any other murder until he is ready to solve it.

The novel, and the other "nationality" mysteries, had the unusual feature of a "Challenge to the Reader" just before the ending is revealed—the novel breaks the fourth wall and speaks directly to the reader. "Ungentle reader, you now have in your possession all the facts pertinent to the only correct solution of the ... problem. ... I say with all good will and a fierce humility: Garde à vous, and a pox on headache!"

A contemporary reviewer, Will Cuppy of the Herald Tribune Books, said "The Greek Coffin Mystery is a lively and well-constructed yarn containing unusual setting, ingenuity of plot, a surprise solution and legitimate use of the analytico-deductive method." (Quoted in the first paperback edition, Pocket Books #179, in 1942.)
