= The Misadventures of Sherlock Holmes =

Collection of Sherlock Holmes pastiches, published in 1944

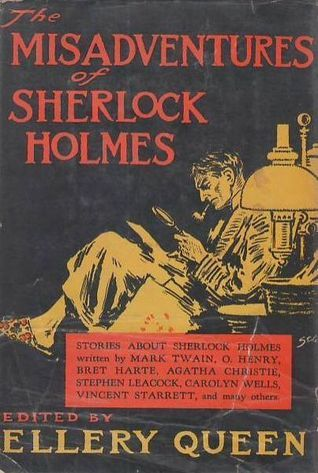
- Editor: Ellery Queen
- Language: English
- Genre: Detective fiction
- Publisher: Little, Brown and Company
- Publication date: March 1944
- Publication place: United States
- Pages: 363

The Misadventures of Sherlock Holmes is an anthology of thirty-three Sherlock Holmes pastiches and parodies, first published in 1944.

The first collection of Holmes pastiches, it consists of stories written by many prominent authors including Agatha Christie, Mark Twain, O. Henry, Anthony Boucher, James M. Barrie, and Anthony Berkeley Cox. It was edited by the American mystery writers Frederic Dannay and Manfred B. Lee under their joint pseudonym Ellery Queen. The book angered the heirs of Sir Arthur Conan Doyle (the creator of Sherlock Holmes) and it was pulled from publication after the original run.

== List of stories ==
The stories are divided into multiple segments

=== Part One: By Detective-Story Writers ===
- The Great Pegram Mystery by Robert Barr
- Holmlock Shears Arrives Too Late by Maurice Leblanc
- The Adventure of the Clothes-Line by Carolyn Wells
- The Unique Hamlet by Vincent Starrett
- Holmes and the Dasher by Anthony Berkeley
- The Case of the Missing Lady by Agatha Christie
- The Adventure of the Illustrious Imposter by Anthony Boucher
- The Disappearance of Mr. James Phillimore by Ellery Queen
- The Adventure of the Remarkable Worm by Stuart Palmer

=== Part Two: By Famous Literary Figures ===
- The Adventure of the Two Collaborators by J.M. Barrie
- A Double-Barrelled Detective Story by Mark Twain
- The Stolen Cigar Case by Bret Harte
- The Adventures of Shamrock Jolnes by O. Henry

=== Part Three: By Humorists ===
- The Umbrosa Burglary by R.C. Lehmann
- The Stranger Unravels a Mystery by John Kendrick Bangs
- Shylock Homes: His Posthumous Memoirs by John Kendrick Bangs
- Maddened by Mystery: or, The Defective Detective by Stephen Leacock
- An Irreducible Detective Story by Stephen Leacock

=== Part Four: By Devotees and others ===
- The Adventure of the Table Foot by Allan Ramsay
- The Sign of the "400" by R. K. Munkittrick
- Our Mr. Smith by Oswald Crawford
- The Footprints on the Ceiling by Jules Castier
- The End of Sherlock Holmes by A. E. P.
- The Adventure of the Norcross Riddle by August Derleth
- The Mary Queen of Scots Jewel by William O. Fuller
- The Ruby Khitmandu by Hugh Kingsmill
- His Last Scrape: or, Holmes, Sweet Holmes! By Rachel Ferguson
- The Adventure of the Murdered Art Editor by Frederic Dorr Steele
- The Canterbury Cathedral Murder by Frederic Arnold Kummer and Basil Mitchell
- The Case of the Missing Patriarchs by Logan Clendening
- The Case of the Diabolical Plot by Richard Mallett
- Christmas Eve by S. C. Roberts
- The Man Who Was Not Dead by Manly Wade Wellman
