= The American Gun Mystery =

1933 novel by Ellery Queen

- First US edition cover design
- Author: Ellery Queen
- Language: English
- Series: Ellery Queen mysteries
- Genre: Mystery, whodunnit
- Publisher: Stokes (US); Gollancz (UK)
- Publication date: 1933
- Publication place: United States
- Media type: Print
- OCLC: 425971515
- Preceded by: The Egyptian Cross Mystery
- Followed by: The Siamese Twin Mystery

The American Gun Mystery (subtitled A Problem in Deduction and also published as Death at the Rodeo) is a novel that was written in 1933 by Ellery Queen. It is the sixth of the Ellery Queen mysteries.

== Plot summary ==
Buck Horne and his faithful horse Injun were once the heroes of many a Western movie in the early days of Hollywood, but when tastes changed, Buck found his talents no longer required. Down on his luck, he went to work in a rodeo exhibition that was appearing in a New York coliseum, giving exhibitions of roping, fancy shooting, and the riding tricks that made him famous. With twenty thousand people in the stands, a group of celebrities including detective Ellery Queen in the boxes, and a full cohort of newsreel movie photographers recording the event for posterity, Buck and forty-one cowboys and cowgirls gallop around the track. Buck Horne is suddenly shot and is trampled beneath the hooves of the horse.

Suspicion falls on many of the rodeo's performers and staff, and even on some of the celebrities, but one crucial and baffling point must be explained before anyone can be arrested. Even though all 20,000-odd people and the entire arena are searched, and the entire event can be reviewed on film, the specific murder gun cannot be found. Ellery Queen works his way through the details of the murderer's plot to set a trap and reveals the identity of the murderer and the hiding place of the gun.

== Literary significance & criticism ==
This novel was the sixth in a long series of novels featuring Ellery Queen, the first nine containing a nationality in the title.

The introduction to this novel contained a detail which is now not considered part of the Ellery Queen canon. The introduction is written as by the anonymous "J.J. McC.", a friend of the Queens. Other details of the lives of the fictional Queen family contained in earlier introductions later disappear and are never mentioned again; the introductory device of "J.J. McC." ends with the tenth Queen novel, Halfway House. "J.J." actually appears in several chapters here, discussing this case with Ellery (and makes a second and last appearance in 1967's Face to Face).

The novel, and the other "nationality" mysteries, had the unusual feature of a "Challenge to the Reader" just before the ending is revealed—the novel breaks the fourth wall and speaks directly to the reader, stating that all essential facts have been revealed and the unique solution to the mystery is now possible.

This novel was published in a Mercury edition in 1951 titled Death at the Rodeo.
