= Drury Lane (character) =

- The four Drury Lane novels
- First appearance: The Tragedy of X
- Last appearance: Drury Lane's Last Case
- Created by: Ellery Queen (writing as "Barnaby Ross")

In-universe information
- Gender: Male
- Occupation: Actor, unofficial detective
- Nationality: American

Drury Lane is a fictional detective created in the 1930s by Frederick Danny and Manfred B. Lee, working under the pen name Barnaby Ross rather than their usual pen name of Ellery Queen. Some reprints have used the Ellery Queen name. Lane is a deaf Shakespearean actor turned amateur sleuth.

== Character overview ==
Lane was born in New Orleans on November 3, 1871. His father was a travelling American tragedian, and his mother an English music hall comic. Drury was born prematurely in a theater, his mother dying in childbirth. He was raised by his father, and made his acting debut aged 7. He was sixteen when his father died.

Lane became a highly celebrated Shakespearean actor, noted author of theatrical studies and biographies, and both a member of the American Academy of Arts and Letters, and an honorary member of the French Legion of Honour. In 1928, he retired from the stage, having developed deafness. He became highly skilled in lip reading.

Upon his retirement, Lane decides to take up amateur sleuthing. He explains in The Tragedy of X, "I think I can bring to this pursuit a rather unique equipment. I have murdered on the stage countless times; emotionally I have suffered the agony of plotting, the torture of conscience. I have been, among others perhaps less noble, Macbeth, and I have been Hamlet. And like a child viewing a simple wonder for the first time, I have just realized that the world is full of Macbeths and Hamlets."

Lane resides in "The Hamlet", a castle overlooking the banks of the Hudson River, and accompanied by a small Elizabethan village, populated by people clad in authentic period garb and all bearing Shakespearean names. He is aided by Quacey (also known as Caliban and Quasimodo), his "hunchbacked" butler and formerly his makeup artist. Lane is also assisted by Inspector Thumm, and later by Thumm’s daughter Patience.

Physically, he is tall and slender, with white hair and greyish-green eyes. Despite being in his 60s, facially he looks much younger.

== List of novels ==
- The Tragedy of X (1932)
- The Tragedy of Y (1932)
- The Tragedy of Z (1933)
- Drury Lane’s Last Case (1933)
