= Ellery Queen's Mystery Magazine Game =

Board game

Ellery Queen's Mystery Magazine Game is a board game published by Mayfair Games in 1986 in which players use deduction to solve mysteries similar to those in the Ellery Queen's Mystery Magazine.

== Description ==
Ellery Queen's Mystery Magazine Game is a game in which one to six players visit locations on a map of New York to investigate the clues there and solve the mystery. The rules also outline a format that can be used by players to create new mysteries for the game.

=== Components ===
- double-sided six-piece map board (large scale map of New York City on one side, the fictional town of Bromlee Station on the reverse)
- 4-page Basic rulebook
- 8-page Advanced rulebook
- Turn record chart
- 32-page book containing five mysteries and the solutions
- six detective cards and matching plastic tokens. Each detective has different expertises and different contacts around the city.
- Detective's Guide to New York, which includes background on various neighbourhoods, as well as where players can go to use their detective's expertise.
- Guide to Bromlee Station gives background information about the fictional town, nearby Bromlee Mansion, and John Hancock College

=== Setup ===
Players randomly draw a detective card and take the matching token. The players choose which mystery to solve, and turn the board to the appropriate map.

=== Movement and clues ===
Players can either move to an adjacent area and then receive a clue; or move two areas but receive no clue. If a character can receive a clue and has a contact in that area, the player receives a more detailed clue.

=== Gameplay: Basic game ===
In the Basic game, when a player receives a clue, the player then reads the clue to all players.

=== Gameplay: Advanced game ===
In the Advanced game, the player reads the clue silently rather than sharing it with other players. Also, each player is able to "squelch" up to three areas, which other players then cannot access unless their character has the appropriate expertise, or has a known contact in that area.

=== Victory conditions ===
If a player feels that they know the solution, they announce their proposed conclusion, then silently read the printed solution to themselves. (The solutions are printed in reverse typeface, necessitating the use of a mirror to read them.) If the player's solution is exactly right, that player wins the game. If the player is wrong, they are eliminated from the game. The game continues until either a player reaches the correct conclusion, or all players have been eliminated.

== Publication history ==
Ellery Queen's Mystery Magazine Game was designed by Darwin Bromley and Laird Brownlee, and published by Mayfair Games in 1986. Mayfair also published two expansion sets the same year:

- From the Casebook of Nick Velvet: Four more mysteries designed by Jody Lynn Nye.
- From the Casebook of Michael Collins' Dan Fortune: Four more mysteries designed by Debbie Christian.

== Reception ==
Phil Frances reviewed Ellery Queen's Mystery Magazine Game for White Dwarf #85, and stated that "Ellery Queen is certainly a challenger to Consulting Detective, with better presentation and a multiplayer option. If only it hadn't slavishly followed the style of Sleuth's game. My top boardgame, I think, despite that."

In the April 1987 edition of Adventurer (Issue 9), Stephen Dillon enjoyed the game but thought that it was "a bit limiting" to only include five mysteries with the game.

In the June 1987 edition of Casus Belli (#38), Gilles Coltard liked the quality of the components, and while he admitted that "this game doesn't really revolutionize the world of investigative gaming, it is simple, of good quality and fun to play."

== Reviews ==
- Games #83
