= The Dutch Shoe Mystery =

1931 novel by Ellery Queen

- First edition (US)
- Author: Ellery Queen
- Language: English
- Series: Ellery Queen mysteries
- Genre: Mystery novel / Whodunnit
- Publisher: Frederick A. Stokes (USA); Gollancz (UK)
- Publication date: 1931
- Publication place: United States
- Media type: Print
- OCLC: 38105971
- Preceded by: The French Powder Mystery
- Followed by: The Greek Coffin Mystery

The Dutch Shoe Mystery (subtitled A Problem in Deduction) is a novel written in 1931 by Ellery Queen. It is the third of the Queen mysteries.

== Plot summary ==
An eccentric millionairess is lying in a diabetic coma on a hospital bed in an anteroom of the surgical suite of the Dutch Memorial Hospital, which she founded, awaiting the removal of her gall bladder. When the surgery is about to begin, the patient is found to have been strangled with picture wire. Although the hospital is crowded, it is well guarded, and only a limited number of people had the opportunity to have murdered her, including members of her family and a small number of the medical personnel.

The apparent murderer is a member of the surgical staff who was actually seen in the victim's vicinity, but his limp makes him easy to impersonate. Ellery Queen examines a pair of hospital shoes, one of which has a broken lace that has been mended with surgical tape. He performs an extended piece of logical deduction based on the shoe, plus such slight clues as the position of a filing cabinet, and creates a list of necessary characteristics of the murderer that narrows the field of suspects down to a single surprising possibility.

== Literary significance and criticism ==
The novel, and the other "nationality" mysteries, had the unusual feature of a "Challenge to the Reader" just before the ending is revealed; the novel breaks the fourth wall and speaks directly to the reader. "At this point in the story of The Dutch Shoe Mystery ... I inject a Challenge to the Reader ... maintaining with perfect sincerity that the reader is now in possession of all the pertinent facts essential to the correct solution of the ... murders."

"In spite of great length and unnecessary imitation of Van Dine, a well-reasoned solution of an attractive problem."
