= Gil Brewer =

American novelist (1922–1983)

- Born: Gilbert John Brewer; November 20, 1922; Canandaigua, New York, United States
- Died: January 9, 1983 (aged 60); St. Petersburg, Florida, United States
- Occupation: Author
- Writing career
- Language: English
- Period: 1951–1983
- Genre: Crime fiction

Gilbert John "Gil" Brewer (November 20, 1922 – January 9, 1983) was an American writer of crime novels and short stories. Born on November 20, 1922, in Canandaigua, New York, he was the son of Gilbert Thomas Brewer and Ruth Wilhelmina Olschewske. Brewer's father was a writer who also published under the name Gil Brewer, specializing in air adventure stories. The older Brewer is most often remembered for having written "Gorilla of the Gas Bags," the cover story for the rare June 1929 issue of Zeppelin Stories.

After leaving the army at the end of World War II, Brewer joined his family, who had settled in St. Petersburg, Florida. There he met Verlaine in 1947 and married her soon after. Brewer started by writing serious novels, but soon turned to pulp paperbacks after a sale to Gold Medal Books in 1950, and afterwards specialized in fast-paced crime novels with a dose of soft-core sexuality. At one point, he had five books on the stands simultaneously. His best-selling book was 13 French Street (1951), which sold over a million copies.

Unwilling to promote himself, his career took a turn for the worse after a mental breakdown, and a long decline into alcoholism. Brewer died on January 9, 1983.

== Works ==
This list does not include most of the many stories where Brewer was published under pseudonyms such as Elaine Evans, Connie Everett, Eric Fitzgerald, Morgana Hill, Jack Holland, Dee Laye, Marc Mixer, Bailey Morgan, Luke Morgann [sic], Frank Sebastian, Alex Sexton, Anita Sultry, Viola Vixen, and more.

=== Novels ===
Published as by Gil Brewer. Reprints.

title	publisher	year	comment
Gun the Dame Down	-	1951
Gun the Dame Down	Stark House	2015	reprint
Satan Is a Woman	Gold Medal	1951
So Rich, So Dead	Gold Medal	1951
13 French Street	Gold Medal	1951
Flight to Darkness	Gold Medal	1952
Hell's Our Destination	Gold Medal	1953
A Killer Is Loose	Gold Medal	1954
Some Must Die	Gold Medal	1954
77 Rue Paradis	Gold Medal	1954
The Squeeze	Ace Double	1955
–And the Girl Screamed	Crest	1956
The Angry Dream	Mystery House	1957
The Brat	Gold Medal	1957
Little Tramp	Crest	1957
The Bitch	Avon	1958
The Red Scarf	Mystery House	1958
Wild	Crest	1958
The Vengeful Virgin	Crest	1958
The Girl from Hateville	Zenith	1958
Wild to Possess	Monarch	1959
Sugar	Avon	1959
Nude on Thin Ice	Avon	1960
Angel	Avon	1960
Backwoods Teaser	Gold Medal	1960
The Three-Way Split	Gold Medal	1960
Play it Hard	Monarch	1960
Appointment in Hell	Monarch	1961
A Taste for Sin	Berkley	1961
Memory of Passion	Lancer	1963
The Hungry One	Gold Medal	1966
The Tease	Banner	1967
Sin for Me	Banner	1967
It Takes a Thief #1: The Devil in Davos	Ace	1969	TV tie-in
It Takes a Thief #2: Mediterranean Caper	Ace	1969	TV tie-in
It Takes a Thief #3: Appointment in Cairo	Ace	1970	TV tie-in
A Devil for O'Shaughnessy	-	1973
A Devil for O'Shaughnessy	Stark House	2008	reprint
Angry Arnold	-	1976
Angry Arnold	Stark House	2015	reprint
The Erotics	Stark House	2015

=== Short story collections ===
- Redheads Die Quickly and Other Stories (University Press of Florida – October 7, 2012)
- Redheads Die Quickly and Other Stories: Expanded Edition (Stark House – March 2019)
- Death Is a Private Eye: Unpublished Stories of Gil Brewer (Stark House – August 2019)
- Die Once–Die Twice: More Unpublished Stories of Gil Brewer (Stark House – January 2020)
- Death Comes Last: The Rest of the 1950s (Stark House – November 2021)
