= 1954 in literature =

This article contains information about the literary events and publications of 1954.

== Events ==
- January – Kingsley Amis's first novel, the comic campus novel Lucky Jim, is published by Victor Gollancz Ltd in London.
- January 7 – The Georgetown–IBM experiment is the first public demonstration of a machine translation system, held in New York at the IBM head office.
- January 25 – Dylan Thomas's radio play Under Milk Wood is first broadcast in the U.K. on the BBC Third Programme, two months after its author's death, with Richard Burton as "First Voice".
- February – The London Magazine is revived as a literary magazine, with John Lehmann as editor.
- March 31 – A. L. Zissu is sentenced in Bucharest to life imprisonment for "conspiring against the social order". This has been a focal point in the anti-Zionist clampdown in Communist Romania.
- May 29 – The rediscovered and restored early 17th-century Corral de comedias de Almagro in Spain is re-inaugurated with a play by Calderon de la Barca.
- June 16 – The first public celebration of "Bloomsday" takes place in Dublin: writers Flann O'Brien, Patrick Kavanagh and Anthony Cronin travel in a horse-drawn coach, stopping at numerous bars to retrace the steps of the characters from James Joyce's novel Ulysses.
- June 22 – In the Parker–Hulme murder case, the 15-year-old Julia Hulme, a future writer of English historical detective fiction as Anne Perry, takes part in the murder of her best friend's mother in Christchurch, New Zealand.
- July 29 – The first volume of J. R. R. Tolkien's epic The Lord of the Rings – The Fellowship of the Ring – is published in London by George Allen & Unwin. The Two Towers follows on November 11 and publication will be completed in 1955. By 2007, 150 million copies will have been sold worldwide.
- September 1 – Lawrence Quincy Mumford becomes the U.S. Librarian of Congress.
- September 17 – William Golding's first novel, the allegorical dystopian Lord of the Flies, is published by Faber and Faber in London.
- September 22 – Terence Rattigan's two linked plays Separate Tables are first performed, at St James's Theatre, London.
- October 30 – John Updike's first story for The New Yorker, "Friends from Philadelphia", is published. He graduates from Harvard with a thesis on George Herbert, and begins a year's Frank Knox Memorial Fellowship to the Ruskin School of Drawing and Fine Art at England's University of Oxford.
- November 19 – Brendan Behan's first play, The Quare Fellow is premiered at the Pike Theatre, Dublin.
- unknown date – Jack Kerouac reads Dwight Goddard's A Buddhist Bible (1932, found in San Jose library), which will influence him greatly.

== New books ==
=== Fiction ===
- Kingsley Amis – Lucky Jim
- Poul Anderson – The Broken Sword
- Thomas Armstrong – Pilling Always Pays
- Isaac Asimov – The Caves of Steel
- Hamilton Basso – The View from Pompey's Head
- John Bingham – The Third Skin
- Boileau-Narcejac – The Living and the Dead (D'entre les morts)
- Lucy M. Boston – Yew Hall
- Pierre Boulle – The Bridge over the River Kwai (Le Pont de la Rivière Kwaï)
- Taylor Caldwell – Never Victorious, Never Defeated
- Victor Canning – Castle Minerva
- John Dickson Carr
  - The Third Bullet and Other Stories
  - The Exploits of Sherlock Holmes (with Adrian Conan Doyle)
- Henry Cecil – According to the Evidence
- Agatha Christie – Destination Unknown
- Robertson Davies – Leaven of Malice
- Cecil Day-Lewis – The Whisper in the Gloom
- Simone de Beauvoir – The Mandarins (Les Mandarins)
- Daphne du Maurier – Mary Anne
- Ian Fleming – Live and Let Die
- Max Frisch – I'm Not Stiller (Stiller)
- Anthony Gilbert – Snake in the Grass
- William Golding – Lord of the Flies
- Richard Gordon – The Captain's Table
- Walter Greenwood – What Everybody Wants
- James Hadley Chase – The Sucker Punch
- Cyril Hare – That Yew Tree's Shade
- Joan Henry – Yield to the Night
- Hergé – Explorers on the Moon (On a marché sur la Lune)
- Hwang Sun-won – The Descendants of Cain (카인의 후예)
- Mac Hyman – No Time for Sergeants
- Hammond Innes – The Strange Land
- Michael Innes – Appleby Talking
- Randall Jarrell – Pictures from an Institution: a comedy
- Elizabeth Jenkins – The Tortoise and the Hare
- Yasunari Kawabata (川端 康成) – The Sound of the Mountain (Yama no Oto; serialization concludes)
- Frances Parkinson Keyes – The Royal Box
- Kalki Krishnamurthy
  - Amara Thara
  - Ponniyin Selvan (பொன்னியின் செல்வன், "The Son of Ponni"; publication concludes)
- Manuel Mujica Láinez – La casa (The House)
- George Lamming – The Emigrants
- Jacques Laurent – Mata Hari's Daughter
- Camara Laye – Le Regard du roi
- Ira Levin – A Kiss Before Dying
- Astrid Lindgren – Mio, My Son
- E. C. R. Lorac
  - Let Well Alone
  - Shroud of Darkness
- Ross Macdonald – Find a Victim
- Compton Mackenzie – Ben Nevis Goes East
- Kamala Markandaya – Nectar in a Sieve
- John Masters – Bhowani Junction
- Richard Matheson – I Am Legend
- John Metcalfe – The Feasting Dead
- James A. Michener – Sayonara
- Paul Morand – Hecate and Her Dogs
- Alberto Moravia – Il disprezzo (A Ghost at Noon)
- Iris Murdoch – Under the Net
- Louis Pauwels – L'Amour monstre
- J. B. Priestley – The Magicians
- Maurice Procter – Hell Is a City
- Marcel Proust (died 1922) – Jean Sauteuil
- Ellery Queen – The Glass Village
- Pauline Réage (Anne Desclos) – Story of O (Histoire d'O)
- Mordecai Richler – The Acrobats
- Lillian Roth – I'll Cry Tomorrow
- Françoise Sagan – Bonjour Tristesse
- Ahmed Sefrioui – La Boîte à merveilles
- Anya Seton – Katherine
- Margit Söderholm – Clouds Over Hellesta
- John Steinbeck – Sweet Thursday
- Irving Stone – Love Is Eternal
- Rex Stout
  - The Black Mountain
  - Three Men Out
- Edward Streeter – Mr. Hobbs Takes a Vacation
- Julian Symons – The Narrowing Circle
- Ahmet Hamdi Tanpınar – Saatleri Ayarlama Enstitüsü (The Time Regulation Institute)
- Morton Thompson – Not as a Stranger
- J. R. R. Tolkien
  - The Lord of the Rings: The Fellowship of the Ring
  - The Lord of the Rings: The Two Towers
- Amos Tutuola – My Life in the Bush of Ghosts
- Tarjei Vesaas – Spring Night
- Gore Vidal – Messiah
- Douglass Wallop – The Year the Yankees Lost the Pennant
- Monique Watteau – La Colère végétale
- Vaughan Wilkins – Fanfare for a Witch
- Frank Yerby
  - Benton's Row
  - Bride of Liberty

=== Children and young people ===
- Rev. W. Awdry – Edward the Blue Engine (ninth in The Railway Series of 42 books by him and his son Christopher Awdry)
- Viola Bayley – Paris Adventure (first in the Adventure series of 16 books)
- Lucy M. Boston – The Children of Green Knowe (first in the Green Knowe series of six books)
- Eleanor Cameron – The Wonderful Flight to the Mushroom Planet
- Meindert DeJong – The Wheel on the School (illustrated by Maurice Sendak)
- Rumer Godden – Impunity Jane: The Story of a Pocket Doll
- Joseph Krumgold – ...And Now Miguel
- C. S. Lewis – The Horse and His Boy
- Dr. Seuss – Horton Hears a Who!
- Rosemary Sutcliff – The Eagle of the Ninth
- Henry Treece
  - Legions of the Eagle
  - The Eagles Have Flown
- Ronald Welch – Knight Crusader

=== Drama ===
- Tawfiq al-Hakim – El Aydi El Na'mah (Soft Hands)
- Brendan Behan – The Quare Fellow
- Dharamvir Bharati – Andha Yug (The Blind Age)
- Agatha Christie – Spider’s Web
- William Douglas Home – The Manor of Northstead
- Peter Jones – The Party Spirit
- Saunders Lewis – Siwan
- Ronald Millar – Waiting for Gillian
- Hugh Mills – The Little Glass Clock
- Terence Rattigan – Separate Tables
- Reginald Rose – Twelve Angry Men (original version as live teleplay)
- Dylan Thomas – Under Milk Wood (radio play)
- Thornton Wilder – The Matchmaker
- Herman Wouk – The Caine Mutiny Court-Martial

=== Poetry ===
- Tomas Tranströmer – 17 Poems (17 dikter)

=== Non-fiction ===
- Gordon Allport – The Nature of Prejudice
- L. Sprague de Camp – Lost Continents
- Rodney Collin – The Theory of Celestial Influence
- Albert Einstein – Ideas and Opinions
- Gerald Gardner – Witchcraft Today
- Aldous Huxley – The Doors of Perception
- Arthur Koestler – The Invisible Writing: The Second Volume Of An Autobiography, 1932–40
- D. R. Matthews – The Social Background of Political Decision-Makers
- Mervyn Peake – Figures of Speech
- Mihai Ralea – Caracterul antiștiințific și antiuman al psihologiei americane (The Anti-Science and Anti-Humanity Nature of American Psychology)
- A. J. P. Taylor – The Struggle for Mastery in Europe 1848–1918
- Alice B. Toklas – The Alice B. Toklas Cookbook
- William Kurtz Wimsatt, Jr. – Verbal Icon: Studies in the Meaning of Poetry (collected essays including "The Intentional Fallacy" and "The Affective Fallacy", cowritten with Monroe Beardsley)
- Barbara Woodhouse
  - Dog Training my Way
  - Talking to Animals (autobiography)

== Births ==
- January 5 – László Krasznahorkai, Hungarian novelist and screenwriter
- January 15 – Jose Dalisay, Jr., Filipino writer
- January 29 – Oprah Winfrey, American actress and talk show host
- January – Cao Wenxuan (曹文軒), Chinese children's book writer and academic
- February 2 – Moniza Alvi, Pakistani-British poet and writer
- February 16 – Iain Banks, Scottish science-fiction writer (died 2013)
- March 4 – Irina Ratushinskaya, Russian writer
- May 6 – Nicholas Crane, English writer, geographer and broadcaster
- March 16 – S. A. Griffin, American actor and poet
- March 20
  - Christoph Ransmayr, Austrian writer
  - Louis Sachar, American children's author
- April 14 – Bruce Sterling, American science-fiction writer
- May 5 – Hamid Ismailov, Uzbek writer
- May 23 – Anja Snellman, Finnish writer
- June 6 – Cynthia Rylant, American children's author and poet
- June 28 – A. A. Gill, British journalist and critic (died 2016)
- July 17 – J. Michael Straczynski, American author
- July 26 - Michael Grant, American young-adult fiction writer
- August 1 – James Gleick, American non-fiction author
- August 15 – Mary Jo Salter, American poet and academic
- August 17 – Anatoly Kudryavitsky, Russian-Irish writer
- September 14 – Mikey Smith, Jamaican dub poet (killed 1983)
- November 8 – Kazuo Ishiguro, Japanese-born English novelist and Nobel laureate
- November 10 – Marlene van Niekerk, South African novelist
- November 11 – Mary Gaitskill, American novelist, essayist and short story writer
- November 12 – Christopher Pike (Kevin Christopher McFadden), American children's author
- December 2 – Ibrahim Nasrallah, Jordanian/Palestinian poet and novelist
- December 3 – Grace Andreacchi, American author
- December 7 – Mark Hofmann, American rare book dealer, forger and murderer
- December 20 – Sandra Cisneros, American writer
- unknown dates
  - Esther Delisle, French Canadian author and historian
  - Roma Tearne (Roma Chrysostom), Sri Lankan novelist and artist

== Deaths ==
- January 1 – Duff Cooper (1st Viscount Norwich), English poet, biographer and politician (born 1890)
- January 21 – E. K. Chambers, English literary scholar (born 1866)
- January 25 – M. N. Roy, Indian philosopher and politician (born 1887)
- February 2 – Hella Wuolijoki, Estonian-born Finnish writer (born 1886)
- February 6 – Maxwell Bodenheim, American poet and novelist (born 1892; murdered)
- March 28 – Francis Brett Young, English novelist and poet (born 1884)
- April 8
  - Juan Álvarez, Argentinian historian (born 1878)
  - Winnifred Eaton, Canadian author (born 1875)
  - Cicely Fox Smith, English poet and nautical writer (born 1882)
- April 19 – Russell Davenport, American journalist and publisher (born 1899)
- May 3 – Earnest Hooton, American writer on anthropology (born 1887)
- June 18 – Constantin Beldie, Romanian literary promoter and memoirist (born 1887)
- July 13 – Grantland Rice, American sportswriter (born 1880)
- July 14 – Jacinto Benavente, Spanish dramatist and Nobel laureate (born 1866)
- August 2 – Julián Padrón, Venezuelan novelist, journalist and lawyer (born 1910)
- August 3 – Colette, French novelist (born 1873)
- September 19 – Miles Franklin, Australian novelist (born 1879)
- September 29 – W. J. Gruffydd, Welsh-language journal editor (born 1881)
- October 22 – Oswald de Andrade, Brazilian poet and polemicist (born 1890)
- November 17 – Ludovic Dauș, Romanian novelist and dramatist (born 1873)
- December 6 – Lucien Tesnière, French grammarian (born 1893)
- December 20 – James Hilton, English novelist (born 1900)

== Awards ==
- Carnegie Medal for children's literature: Ronald Welch, Knight Crusader
- Friedenspreis des Deutschen Buchhandels: Carl Jacob Burckhardt
- James Tait Black Memorial Prize:
  - Fiction: C. P. Snow, The New Men and The Masters
  - Biography: Keith Feiling, Warren Hastings
- Newbery Medal for children's literature: Joseph Krumgold, ...And Now Miguel
- Nobel Prize for Literature: Ernest Miller Hemingway
- Premio Nadal: Francisco Alcántara, La muerte sienta bien a Villalobos
- Prix Goncourt: Simone de Beauvoir, Les mandarins
- Pulitzer Prize:
  - Drama: John Patrick, The Teahouse of the August Moon
  - Fiction: no award given
  - Poetry: Theodore Roethke: TheWaking
- Queen's Gold Medal for Poetry: Ralph Hodgson
- Hugo Award:
  - Best Novella: James Blish, A Case of Conscience
