= Donald R. Matthews =

Donald R. Matthews may refer to:

- Donald Ray Matthews, U.S. Representative from Florida
- Donald Matthews (political scientist) (Donald Rowe Matthews), American political scientist
