= Origin of evil =

Origin of evil may refer to:

- The origin of evil in the world; see Problem of evil and Theodicy
- The Origin of Evil, 1951 novel
- The Origin of Evil, 2020 film, unrelated to the novel
- Ouija: Origin of Evil, 2016 film
