= Aunt Fanny =

Aunt Fanny may refer to:

== People ==
- Pen name of Frances Dana Barker Gage, a leading American reformer, feminist and abolitionist.
- Pen name of Frances Elizabeth Barrow, a children's writer.
- Stage name of Fran Allison, television and radio comedian.

== Film ==
- Aunt Fanny, a character in Sporting Love.
- Aunt Fanny, a character in Robots.

== Novels ==
- Aunt Fanny, a character in The Famous Five.
- Aunt Fanny, a character in The Cat Who....
- Aunt Fanny, a character in Gates of Paradise.
- Aunt Fanny, a character in The Glass Village.

== Comics ==
- Aunt Fanny Coot, a character in the Donald Duck comic strip.
