= John Onions =

John Onions may refer to:

- John Onions, who founded the precursor of the engineering firm Alldays & Onions in 1650
- Onion Johnny, a Welsh nickname for Breton farmers who travelled to Wales to sell their onions from bicycles
- Onion John, an American children's novel of 1959
