= Donald Matthews =

Donald Matthews may refer to:

- Donald Ray Matthews, U.S. Representative from Florida
- Donald Matthews (political scientist), American political scientist
- Don Matthews, American coach of Canadian football teams
