= Ten Days' Wonder =

1948 novel by Ellery Queen

- First US edition
- Author: Ellery Queen
- Language: English
- Series: Ellery Queen mysteries
- Genre: Mystery novel
- Publisher: Little, Brown (US); Gollancz (UK)
- Publication date: 1948
- Publication place: United States
- Media type: Print (hardcover and paperback)
- Preceded by: The Murderer is a Fox
- Followed by: Cat of Many Tails

Ten Days' Wonder is a novel that was published in 1948 by Ellery Queen. It is a mystery novel primarily set in the imaginary town of Wrightsville, United States.

== Plot summary ==
Howard Van Horn, son of millionaire Diedrich Van Horn, comes to Ellery Queen with the request that Ellery investigate what Howard has been doing during a recent bout with amnesia. The trail leads to the small New England town of Wrightsville and what seems to be a love triangle with Howard's stepmother, the beautiful young Sally, from the "wrong side of the tracks" in class-conscious Wrightsville. A series of small and unusual crimes over the next nine days seem to be committed by Howard during amnesiac blackouts, and Ellery Queen suddenly realizes the bizarre pattern that underpins the series of crimes.

== Literary significance and criticism ==
(See Ellery Queen.) After many popular mystery novels, a radio program and a number of movies, the character of Ellery Queen was at this point firmly established. This novel is the third to take place against the setting of the imaginary New England town of Wrightsville (following Calamity Town and The Murderer is a Fox) and, as is common in the Wrightsville novels, depends more on characterization, atmosphere and the observed minutiae of small-town American life than many other Queen novels; this novel less so, because of the necessity to make characters and events fit into the underlying format. "The town with its gossip and cliques is well done ... [one of] the complex and mundane mysteries ... favored by the ingenious authors." "All Wrightsville murders are well written as more attention is given to character development and humor. The way some Wrightsville stories interlink only adds to the fun ... This is the era wherein Ellery Queen experiments with minimalism as his work is stripped down to its most fundamental features. ... The more fallible side to Ellery is especially emphasized. Nowhere else is the limitation of reason better shown than in Ten Days' Wonder. Ellery went through the turmoil of extreme self-doubt, almost giving up on being a detective ... and another double-twist ending. Brilliant portrayals, be it a little far-fetched."

"(Ellery's) exploits took place more frequently in the small town of Wrightsville, where his arrival as a house guest was likely to be the signal for the commission of one or more murders. Very intelligently, Dannay and Lee used this change in locale to loosen the structure of their stories. More emphasis was placed on personal relationships, and less on the details of investigation. ... In later stories, however, fantastic ingenuity takes over at the expense of characterization, as in Ten Days' Wonder ... One can admire the ingenuity, and yet sense that there is something wrong about the way in which Queen is turning back to Van Dine and abandoning the possibilities glimpsed in the first Wrightsville books."

== Film adaptation ==
The book was made into the 1971 French film Ten Days' Wonder directed by Claude Chabrol and starring Orson Welles, Anthony Perkins and Marlène Jobert as Van Horn father, son and wife/stepmother (their first names changed to Theo, Charles and Helene), and Michel Piccoli as "Paul Regis", who replaces Ellery Queen as the principal investigator.
