= The King Is Dead =

The King Is Dead may refer to:

== Film and television ==
- The King Is Dead!, a 2012 Australian film
- "The King Is Dead" (Family Guy), the seventh episode of the second season of Family Guy
- The King Is Dead (TV series), a British comedy show created, written by and starring Simon Bird

== Music ==
- The King Is Dead (album), the sixth studio album by The Decemberists
- "The King Is Dead" (Go West song), on the 1987 album Dancing on the Couch
- "The King Is Dead" (Tony Cole song), 1972

== Other uses ==
- The King Is Dead (novel), a 1951 novel by Ellery Queen
- The king is dead, long live the king!, a traditional proclamation made following the accession of a new monarch

== See also ==
- "King's Dead", a song by Jay Rock, Kendrick Lamar and Future with James Blake from the Black Panther soundtrack
- "The King Is Dead But The Queen Is Alive", a song by Pink on the Japanese edition of The Truth About Love
- The Queen Is Dead (disambiguation)
