= Before Midnight (novel) =

1955 novel by Rex Stout

- Author: Rex Stout
- Cover artist: Bill English
- Language: English
- Series: Nero Wolfe
- Genre: Detective fiction
- Publisher: Viking Press
- Publication date: October 27, 1955
- Publication place: United States
- Media type: Print (Hardcover)
- Pages: 184 (first edition)
- OCLC: 170384
- Preceded by: The Black Mountain
- Followed by: Three Witnesses

Before Midnight is a novel by American author Rex Stout, published in 1955 by Viking Press. It is the 18th detective novel featuring curmudgeonly New York sleuth Nero Wolfe, as narrated by sidekick Archie Goodwin. The story was also collected in the omnibus volume Three Trumps (Viking 1973).

The story concerns Wolfe being hired to investigate documents missing from a million-dollar prize contest for a perfume company, with the title a reference to the deadline for winning entries: postmarked before midnight on the specified date. The investigation leads to murder and more. Numerous major works of literature are mentioned as part of the contest. Four poetic riddles describing real and fictional women are given, and three of them are solved, two by Archie, and one by Wolfe. The fourth is never solved within the text. The story includes an unusual feature as the denouement takes place in the company offices, not in Wolfe’s own office in his brownstone.

== Plot summary ==
Nero Wolfe is approached by corporate attorney Rudolf Hansen and his clients Oliver Buff, Vernon Assa and Patrick O'Garro, the chief executives of Manhattan advertising agency Lippert Buff Assa (LBA). They want Wolfe to save them from embarrassment and ruin following the murder of Louis Dahlmann, an up-and-coming advertising executive with the firm. Dahlmann's wallet was stolen, and inside were the answers for a final series of poetic riddles run as part of a promotional competition for Pour Amour, a brand of perfume. The first prize of the competition is $500,000. In a meeting with the final five contestants the night of his death, Dahlmann had revealed that he kept the answers in his wallet, which lead the police to suspect one of the contestants. The executives want Wolfe to find out who stole the wallet before the contest deadline — midnight of April 19, one week later, to ensure the integrity of proceedings and restore their reputation. Despite tension between the advertising agency and Talbott Heery, owner of the company that produces Pour Amour, Wolfe agrees to their terms.

Wolfe dispatches Archie Goodwin to copy the final riddles and their answers for Wolfe's reference. He gives cash to Saul. Wolfe interviews each of the contestants: Gertrude Frazee, the leader of an anti-cosmetics women's group who has been using her members to find the answers for the riddles to embarrass the cosmetics industry; Carol Wheelock, a housewife who wants the prize money to secure a better life for her family; Harold Rollins, a condescending academic who entered the competition as part of an intellectual exercise; Susan Tescher, a magazine editor who wants to do a profile on Wolfe himself; and Philip Younger, a retiree seeking to recover a fortune he lost during the Great Depression. Although skeptical that Wolfe is only investigating the theft and not the murder, Inspector Cramer shares what the police have learned about the case so far. Other than the financial motive, none of the contestants appears to have had any serious reason or opportunity to either murder Dahlmann or steal the answers. Archie fears that Wolfe's investigation is losing energy and focus.

As the deadline nears, the LBA executives panic and lash out, resulting in a contradictory sequence where Wolfe is fired and then rehired within a span of minutes. When all seems lost, however, an anonymous source sends copies of the answers to each of the contestants, thus voiding the contest and saving LBA. Although Archie, the LBA executives and the police suspect Wolfe of doing so, he insists that he was not responsible. He suspects one of the advertising executives of stealing the wallet, if not murdering Dahlmann. Vernon Assa approaches Wolfe and attempts to unilaterally dismiss him from the case, but Wolfe refuses. Wolfe summons the major players to his office and claims he will reveal the identity of the thief, and provide the police with vital information to identify the murderer. Before he can do so, however, Vernon Assa is poisoned with cyanide slipped into his drink and dies on the floor of Wolfe's office. Dahlmann's wallet is found in his pocket, suggesting that he is the thief and murderer.

Infuriated at the murder of someone who was enjoying his hospitality and skeptical of Assa's guilt, Wolfe moves to name the true culprit. Wolfe, Archie and four operatives travel to the offices of LBA. They inspect a display of products from their clients, discovering the bottle of cyanide used to murder Assa. This confirms the guilt of one of the executives.

Confronting Buff, O'Garro and Hansen in their conference room, Wolfe lays out the facts of the case and accuses Buff of murdering both Dahlmann and Assa. Buff is the man who had clear means and opportunity, and motive. He was driven to murder Dahlmann out of jealousy over Dahlmann's skills threatening his position. Assa discovered the wallet that Buff stole from Dahlmann, and Buff murdered Assa to silence him. When Buff tries to throw suspicion on O'Garro, O'Garro says that Wolfe is correct. They call the police to take the source of the cyanide. Buff is convicted of murder.

The remaining LBA executives ask Wolfe to continue managing the contest. Wolfe refuses this task. One executive praises the action of mailing the answers to the five contestants as a brilliant act to end a problem, unaware who mailed them. Wolfe states that he will be adding onto his bill the price of a used typewriter that has been disposed of in the East River, as a person in his employ mailed the correct answers to the five contestants, allowing a new set of verses to settle the winners. He is finished with that contest.

== Characters ==
- Nero Wolfe – sedentary Manhattan private detective, orchid fancier, gourmet/gourmand, and self-educated man, with an extensive personal library/office where he conducts nearly all business
- Archie Goodwin – Wolfe's live-in right-hand man (assistant), agent provocateur, man of action
- Fritz Brenner – the Wolfe household's live-in world-class Swiss French chef
- Rudolph Hansen – attorney at law, representing Lippert, Buff & Assa (LBA), a prominent Madison Avenue advertising agency
- Oliver Buff – a partner in LBA
- Patrick O'Garro – another partner in LBA
- Vernon Assa – third and final partner of LBA (Mr Lippert has been dead for a while, and Mr. O'Garro has taken his place)
- Talbott Heery – owner of Heery Products, a major cosmetics company, and in particular the Pour Amour brand of perfume being promoted by LBA in a major contest
- Louis Dahlmann – employee of LBA, in charge of the Heery account, creator of the perfume contest, but now murdered and his wallet stolen, the latter detail being more urgent to LBA than the former
- Finalists in the perfume contest, from all over the US, but brought to NYC by LBA/Heery for the final round of the perfume contest
  - Susan Tescher, from NYC, editor at Clock magazine besides contestant in the perfume contest
    - Mr Hibbard, attorney,
    - Mr Schulz, associate editor,
    - Mr Knudsen, senior editor, all staff of Clock who accompany Ms. Tescher on a visit to Wolfe, not only about the contest but hoping to do an article on Wolfe himself
  - Carol Wheelock, from Richmond, Virginia
  - Philip Younger, from Chicago, Illinois
  - Harold Rollins, from Burlington, Iowa
  - Gertrude Frazee, from Los Angeles, California, founder and president of the Woman's Nature League, a pressure group opposed to women using cosmetics. Ms Frazee's dialogue includes a graphic description of the source of musk.
- Doctor Vollmer – a neighbor and friend of Wolfe's, called upon whenever a dead body is discovered in the Wolfe household (something that, based on past Wolfe novels, happens distressingly often)
- Theodore Horstmann – the Wolfe household's orchid nurse, rarely seen outside the plant rooms on the roof the brownstone
- Saul Panzer – high-priced freelance detective whom Wolfe uses, not always with the foreknowledge of Goodwin, to perform difficult and sensitive tasks for which Archie cannot be spared, or which Wolfe wants to (temporarily) hide from Archie. In Nero Wolfe novels, such a maneuver is nearly always a place where the reader should pause, because Wolfe has made a deduction that he hasn't revealed to Archie.
- Fred Durkin, Orrie Cather, Bill Gore – freelance operatives Wolfe uses to help find specific evidence near the novel's conclusion. Johnny Keems, another operative Wolfe sometimes uses, is mentioned but ultimately not hired. Gore's final appearance in a Stout volume.

== The unfamiliar word ==
Wolfe notes a bill introduced in British Parliament in 1770 which would punish women for wearing makeup and other fashions, including "Spanish wool," a term Wolfe is unfamiliar with. It was a form of rouge.

== Allusions to real events ==
Wolfe is reading a novel published in 1953 in the early chapters of this story, titled Beauty for Ashes by Christopher La Farge. It was thus a recent book, reviewed in the local newspaper. Wolfe then read the collected writings of Clifton Fadiman, published in April 1955.

== Reviews and commentary ==
- Jacques Barzun and Wendell Hertig Taylor, A Catalogue of Crime — It is brisk and clever enough, but not one in which Archie shines with special luster."
- Terry Teachout, "Forty years with Nero Wolfe" (January 12, 2009) — Rex Stout's witty, fast-moving prose hasn't dated a day, while Wolfe himself is one of the enduringly great eccentrics of popular fiction. I've spent the past four decades reading and re-reading Stout's novels for pleasure, and they have yet to lose their savor ... It is to revel in such writing that I return time and again to Stout's books, and in particular to The League of Frightened Men, Some Buried Caesar, The Silent Speaker, Too Many Women, Murder by the Book, Before Midnight, Plot It Yourself, Too Many Clients, The Doorbell Rang, and Death of a Doxy, which are for me the best of all the full-length Wolfe novels.

== Publication history ==
- 1955, New York: Viking Press, October 27, 1955, hardcover
  In his limited-edition pamphlet, Collecting Mystery Fiction #9, Rex Stout's Nero Wolfe Part I, Otto Penzler describes the first edition of Before Midnight: "Pale blue cloth, front cover and spine printed with dark blue; rear cover blank. Issued in a mainly black dust wrapper."
  In April 2006, Firsts: The Book Collector's Magazine estimated that the first edition of Before Midnight had a value of between $200 and $350. The estimate is for a copy in very good to fine condition in a like dustjacket.
  The "concept-driven" dustjacket designed by Bill English was cited by graphic design scholar Steven Heller for its modernist techniques—photomontage, spare use of color, sans-serif typography and use of the entire front and back cover area.
- 1956, New York: Viking Press (Mystery Guild), January 1956, hardcover
  The far less valuable Viking book club edition may be distinguished from the first edition in three ways:
  - The dust jacket has "Book Club Edition" printed on the inside front flap, and the price is absent (first editions may be price clipped if they were given as gifts).
  - Book club editions are sometimes thinner and always taller (usually a quarter of an inch) than first editions.
  - Book club editions are bound in cardboard, and first editions are bound in cloth (or have at least a cloth spine).
  - Book club editions lack a page listing "Books by Rex Stout".
- 1956, London: Collins Crime Club, May 7, 1956, hardcover
- 1957, New York: Bantam #A1632, July 1957, paperback
- 1962, London: Fontana #725, 1962
- 1973, New York: Viking Press, Three Trumps: A Nero Wolfe Omnibus (with If Death Ever Slept and The Black Mountain), April 1973, hardcover
- Stout, Rex (1976). Before Midnight. Bantam. ISBN 0-553-02831-6.
- 1995, New York: Bantam Books ISBN 0-553-76304-0 November 1, 1995, paperback
- 2004, Auburn, California: The Audio Partners Publishing Corp., Mystery Masters ISBN 1-57270-412-8 September 2004, audio CD (unabridged, read by Michael Prichard)
- 2010, New York: Bantam ISBN 978-0-307-75571-1 May 19, 2010, e-book
