= Invitation to Murder =

- Short story by Rex Stout
- Original title: Will to Murder
- Country: United States
- Language: English
- Genre: Detective fiction

Publication
- Published in: The American Magazine
- Publication type: Periodical
- Publication date: August 1953
- Series: Nero Wolfe

"Invitation to Murder" is a Nero Wolfe mystery novella by Rex Stout, first published as "Will to Murder" in the August 1953 issue of The American Magazine. It first appeared in book form in the short-story collection Three Men Out, published by the Viking Press in 1954.

== Plot summary ==
Herman Lewent offers to pay Wolfe $1,000 to solve a problem regarding his family's finances. Lewent's father left his entire estate to his daughter Beryl in his will 20 years earlier, with a provision that she should look after Lewent's needs. She sent him $1,000 per month until her death one year ago, leaving the estate to her husband, Theodore Huck. Lewent has tried to persuade Huck to give him a portion of the money, to no avail; Huck intends to keep sending him only the $1,000 monthly payment. Now, Lewent is concerned that one of Huck's three attractive female employees is trying to seduce him into cutting Lewent off, and he wants Wolfe to find out which one it is. When Wolfe rejects the case as a family squabble, Lewent mentions that Beryl died of ptomaine poisoning at Huck's house; he believes that one of the three women murdered her. Wolfe turns the case over to Archie, who accepts and travels to Huck's mansion, where Lewent also lives.

Huck's declining health has confined him to a wheelchair, which is motorized and outfitted with various conveniences. The three employees Lewent suspects are secretary Dorothy Riff, nurse Sylvia Marcy, and housekeeper Cassie O'Shea. Archie questions Huck, using the pretense that Beryl might have hinted at entrusting one of them with part of her father's estate to be turned over to Lewent, in an attempt to draw out information on them. Huck sees through the deception and even believes it might be part of a blackmail scheme on Lewent's part, so Archie questions the women instead, as well as Huck's nephew Paul Thayer, who lives in the mansion and who warned Lewent about the women's possible designs on the money. Stopping at Lewent's room, Archie finds him lying dead on the floor inside, the base of his skull caved in. However, the skin is not broken, there is no blood on the floor, and the blow appears to have been delivered at an upward angle. The geometry of the room leads him to believe that Lewent was killed elsewhere and his body moved to this location.

Archie calls Wolfe with an update, then continues his questioning of the household members without revealing his knowledge of Lewent's death to any of them. He is thrown off by Huck's decision to present Dorothy, Sylvia, and Cassie each with an expensive jeweled wristwatch. Finding himself stumped after dinner that evening, Archie calls Wolfe and tricks him into coming to the mansion by faking an attack on himself. Wolfe is furious that Archie would stoop to such methods, but prepares to question the household about both Lewent's allegations and Beryl's death. He learns that Beryl had died after eating pickled artichokes at a party; since she had taken them all and no other guests became ill, it was assumed that the artichokes had been poisoned.

Wolfe offers Huck a deal: for $100,000, he will investigate and use what he finds to persuade Lewent that his suspicions are groundless, with the caveat that no one will ever tell Lewent of this arrangement. Huck accepts the terms and everyone agrees to keep them secret, and Wolfe and Archie excuse themselves to speak with Lewent in his room. Only after Wolfe has examined the body and the scene does he allow Archie to call the police and tell the others of the murder. Inspector Cramer and his men soon arrive to question the household members; while this is going on, Archie suddenly realizes that he knows how Lewent's body was transported without attracting attention.

Wolfe identifies Huck as the murderer and explains that he tricked Lewent into bending over to pick something up off the floor, then struck him with a spherical paperweight. The smooth surface would not break the skin, and Lewent's posture would make it appear that the blow was delivered upward. Huck then put the body in his lap, covered it with the quilt he always used to keep his legs warm, and drove his wheelchair to Lewent's room to dump the body. He was eager to accept Wolfe's $100,000 offer because he knew that Lewent would never hear of the results, and he had earlier poisoned Beryl in order to inherit her fortune. Cassie provides further motive, saying that Huck had been having an affair with her; when Beryl found out about it, Huck made up his mind to kill her.

Sylvia removes her wristwatch and puts it in Huck's lap as Cramer prepares to take him into custody. Even though he is eventually convicted, Archie does not know if Dorothy or Cassie ever returned theirs.

== Publication history ==
=== "Invitation to Murder" ===
- 1953, The American Magazine, August 1953 (as "Will to Murder")
- 1979, Ellery Queen's Mystery Magazine, September 1979

=== Three Men Out ===
- 1954, New York: The Viking Press, March 26, 1954, hardcover

Contents include "Invitation to Murder", "The Zero Clue" and "This Won't Kill You".
In his limited-edition pamphlet, Collecting Mystery Fiction #9, Rex Stout's Nero Wolfe Part I, Otto Penzler describes the first edition of Three Men Out: "Red boards, front cover blank. Issued in a red, black and white dust wrapper. … The binding of this title was a textured cardboard designed to resemble cloth; the book club edition has a smoother texture."
In April 2006, Firsts: The Book Collector's Magazine estimated that the first edition of Three Men Out had a value of between $200 and $350. The estimate is for a copy in very good to fine condition in a like dustjacket.

- 1954, New York: Viking (Mystery Guild), June 1954, hardcover

The far less valuable Viking book club edition may be distinguished from the first edition in three ways:

- The dust jacket has "Book Club Edition" printed on the inside front flap, and the price is absent (first editions may be price clipped if they were given as gifts).
- Book club editions are sometimes thinner and always taller (usually a quarter of an inch) than first editions.
- Book club editions are bound in cardboard, and first editions are bound in cloth (or have at least a cloth spine).

- 1955, London: Collins Crime Club, January 17, 1955, hardcover
- 1955, Toronto: Macmillan, 1955, hardcover
- 1955, New York: Bantam #1388, November 1955, paperback
- 1991, New York: Bantam Crimeline ISBN 0-553-24547-3 June 1, 1991, paperback
- 1994, New York: Bantam Crimeline ISBN 0-553-24547-3 May 1994, paperback, Rex Stout Library edition with introduction by Linda Ellerbee
- 1997, Newport Beach, California: Books on Tape, Inc. ISBN 0-7366-3749-4 July 21, 1997, audio cassette (unabridged, read by Michael Prichard)
- 2011, New York: Bantam Crimeline ISBN 978-0-307-76816-2 August 17, 2011, e-book
