= The Murderer Is a Fox =

1945 novel by Ellery Queen

- First US edition
- Author: Ellery Queen
- Language: English
- Series: Ellery Queen mysteries
- Genre: Mystery novel
- Publisher: Little, Brown (US); Gollancz (UK)
- Publication date: 1945
- Publication place: United States
- Media type: Print (hardcover and paperback)
- Preceded by: There Was an Old Woman
- Followed by: Ten Days' Wonder

The Murderer Is a Fox is a novel that was published in 1945 by Ellery Queen. It is a mystery novel primarily set in the imaginary town of Wrightsville, US.

== Plot summary ==
Ellery Queen investigates a murder that took place a number of years ago and has blighted the present-day lives of members of the Fox family.

For the twelve years following the death of Davy's mother Jessica, and the trial of his father, Davy Fox has suffered inner torture. Davy knew he loved his wife ... as well as he knew he was going to kill her. He didn't know just when it was going to happen – but when a man is born to be a murderer, it's only a matter of time before he claims his birthright. Love turns out to be a matter of life and death – and it's up to Ellery Queen to make the choice!"

== Literary significance & criticism ==
After many popular mystery novels, a radio program and a number of movies, the character of Ellery Queen was at this point firmly established. This novel is the second to take place against the setting of the imaginary New England town of Wrightsville (following Calamity Town) and, as is common in the Wrightsville novels, depends more on characterization, atmosphere and the observed minutiae of small-town American life than many other Queen novels, especially earlier ones, which are more stylized puzzles.

Very intelligently, Dannay and Lee used this change in locale to loosen the structure of their stories. More emphasis was placed on personal relationships, and less on the details of investigation. For a time this worked well. Calamity Town (1942) and The Murderer is a Fox (1945) are two books in which the transition from one kind of crime story to another is successfully managed, although a feeling lingers that they would be even better books if Ellery did not appear in them.

In Wrightsville Ellery gets invariably separated from the New York Police Department and thus his normal modus operandi. He has to rely on his reputation as sleuth to give him access to any police investigations. The more fallible side to Ellery is essentially emphasized. ... EQ's second visit to Wrightsville brings his most vividly involving character studies; on this level, it's EQ's masterpiece. A pity that the final resolution is based on rather thin evidence.
