= If Death Ever Slept =

1957 novel by Rex Stout

- Author: Rex Stout
- Cover artist: Bill English
- Language: English
- Series: Nero Wolfe
- Genre: Detective fiction
- Publisher: Viking Press
- Publication date: October 25, 1957
- Publication place: United States
- Media type: Print (Hardcover)
- Pages: 186 pp. (first edition)
- OCLC: 1836728
- Preceded by: Three for the Chair
- Followed by: And Four to Go

If Death Ever Slept is a Nero Wolfe detective novel by Rex Stout, published by the Viking Press in 1957 and collected in the omnibus volume Three Trumps (Viking 1973).

== Plot introduction ==
Millionaire Otis Jarrell retains Nero Wolfe to get a snake out of his house – the snake being his daughter-in-law, whom he believes is ruining his business deals by leaking information to his competitors. Since Archie and Wolfe are in the midst of one of their periodic squabbles, it is decided that Archie will move into Jarrell's Fifth Avenue penthouse apartment, posing as his new secretary. While he's away, detective Orrie Cather, who lusts after Archie's job, tests out Archie's desk.

== Plot ==
Millionaire Otis Jarrell offers to hire Wolfe to get his daughter-in-law Susan out of his house. He is convinced that she has ruined several of his business deals by leaking confidential information to his competitors, and he suspects her of infidelity toward his son Wyman. Wolfe refuses to get involved in what he sees as a marital disagreement, but accepts a $10,000 retainer from Jarrell to hire Archie as a live-in secretary. Taking the alias "Alan Green," Archie is to replace the previous secretary, whom Jarrell had fired one week earlier on suspicion of being the source of the leak.

Arriving at the Jarrell penthouse on the following Monday, Archie meets the rest of the family and associates, including Jarrell's wife Trella; his grown children, Wyman and Lois; Wyman's wife Susan; Trella's brother, Roger Foote; and Jarrell's stenographer, Nora Kent. Over the course of the week, Archie learns from Trella that Jarrell had made a pass at Susan but was rejected; he also encounters James L. Eber, Jarrell's former secretary, having a private conversation with Susan. Nora explains that he had visited the penthouse in order to retrieve some papers from his desk.

Shortly after Archie sees Eber, Jarrell discovers that someone has sneaked into his library and stolen a .38 revolver from his desk, holding up a rug to foil a security camera at the doorway. Jarrell believes that Susan is responsible for the theft, but Archie reports to Wolfe the next day and is dispatched to investigate Eber's apartment. There he finds Eber's body, shot in the head; news of the murder reaches Jarrell the following morning, throwing him into a panic that the police may begin digging into his private affairs. Archie learns from Lon Cohen that the fatal bullet is a .38, and Wolfe has him bring everyone involved to his office that evening. Included in the group is Corey Brigham, a rival of Jarrell who benefited from the information leaks and who had been to dinner at the penthouse when the gun was stolen.

Nora arrives by herself, well ahead of the scheduled meeting. With Archie observing through the office peephole and Orrie Cather posing as him, Wolfe tries to allay Nora's suspicions that Jarrell hired Archie to investigate the family. During the actual meeting, Wolfe appeals to the group to produce the gun, without success. Over the weekend, Inspector Cramer visits the brownstone demanding to know why Archie is working for Jarrell under an assumed name. Wolfe tells Cramer nothing except that he had not been hired by Eber, but Cramer questions the family and learns about the arrangement. With the pretense dropped, Archie is called in for questioning by the district attorney; not long after he returns to the penthouse, a news report announces that Brigham has been found dead, shot in the chest.

Returning to the brownstone, Archie is soon called in for another round of questioning, during which he learns that Brigham was also killed with a .38. This fact prompts Wolfe to summon the principals to his office again and question them about their movements over a time period covering both murders. He returns Jarrell's retainer, then calls Cramer to get permission for Archie to copy the statements they have given the police, reassuring him that Wolfe does not currently know the identity of the murderer. Lois tries to persuade Archie to corroborate a claim that she took Jarrell's gun and threw it in a river in order to prevent anyone from using it, but he quickly realizes that she is not telling the truth.

Once Wolfe has the statements, he sends Archie, Orrie, Saul Panzer, Fred Durkin, Dol Bonner, and Sally Colt to investigate every location visited by the principals. Four days later, a man delivers a small package to the brownstone; it proves to contain a spent .38 bullet, which Wolfe turns over to Cramer for testing. Following a night of repeated attempts by the police to call Wolfe or gain entry, Wolfe learns from Cramer that the bullet came from the same gun that killed both Eber and Brigham. He announces that he is ready to deliver both the weapon and the murderer and has Cramer bring everyone to his office.

The group is joined by Cramer, Sergeant Purley Stebbins, and all five free-lance detectives. Dol hands over the missing gun, which she found in a locker at a women's health spa and test-fired in order to obtain the bullet that was delivered to Wolfe. The locker belongs to Susan, who tries unsuccessfully to get Wyman to back her claim of being with him at the time the gun was stolen. Based on Jarrell's testimony at her trial, the prosecution theorizes that she had persuaded Eber to steal information which she then passed on to Brigham. After Eber was fired, he learned of Brigham's profit on the deal and realized what Susan had done; she killed him to keep him quiet, then did the same to Brigham. She is convicted, but Archie expresses doubts as to whether she will receive the death penalty.

As he pays Wolfe's fee, Jarrell reiterates his belief that Susan is a "snake," but Wolfe does not share it.

== Cast of characters ==
- Nero Wolfe — Private investigator
- Archie Goodwin — Wolfe's assistant (and narrator of all Wolfe stories)
- Otis Jarrell — Millionaire
- Trella Jarrell — Jarrell's second wife
- Lois Jarrell — Jarrell's daughter by his first wife, and a good dancer
- Wyman Jarrell — Jarrell's son by his first wife
- Susan Jarrell — Wyman's wife; Jarrell's daughter in law
- Roger Foote — Trella's brother
- Nora Kent — Stenographer
- James L. Eber — Ex-secretary
- Corey Brigham — Friend of the family; business rival of Jarrell
- Saul Panzer, Fred Durkin, Orrie Cather - Free-lance detectives employed by Wolfe
- Theodolinda "Dol" Bonner - Female private investigator
- Sally Colt - A member of Dol's staff
- Inspector Cramer, Sergeant Purley Stebbins — Manhattan Homicide investigators

== Reviews and commentary ==
- Jacques Barzun and Wendell Hertig Taylor, A Catalogue of Crime — Though Archie Goodwin is here in top form, not much else can be said for this dose of the mixture as before. Archie is put in as secretary to a rich operator whose business secrets are being stolen. Wolfe neither foresees nor prevents a couple of murders. His activities are limited to three lengthy interviews, at the last of which the killer is unmasked by the use of evidence supplied largely by Inspector Cramer.

== Adaptations ==
=== Nero Wolfe (Radiotelevisione italiana S.p.A.) ===
==== Circuito chiuso (1969) ====
If Death Ever Slept was adapted for a series of Nero Wolfe films produced by the Italian television network RAI. Directed by Giuliana Berlinguer from a teleplay by Margherita Cattaneo, "Circuito chiuso" aired March 7, 1969.

The series of black-and-white telemovies stars Tino Buazzelli (Nero Wolfe), Paolo Ferrari (Archie Goodwin), Pupo De Luca (Fritz Brenner), Renzo Palmer (Inspector Cramer), and Mario Righetti (Orrie Cather). Other members of the cast of "Circuito chiuso" include Mario Pisu (Otis Jarrell), Marzia Ubaldi (Trella Jarrell), Romina Power (Lois Jarrell), Umberto D'Orsi (Roger Foote), Pier Luigi Zollo (Wyman Jarrell), Barbara Valmorin (Nora Kent), Luciano Tacconi (Corey Brigham), Laura Tavanti (Susan Jarrell) and Germano Longo (Jim Eber).

==== Parassiti (2012) ====
Alessandro Sermoneta and Chiara Laudani adapted If Death Ever Slept for the sixth episode of the RAI TV series Nero Wolfe (Italy 2012), starring Francesco Pannofino as Nero Wolfe and Pietro Sermonti as Archie Goodwin. Set in 1959 in Rome, where Wolfe and Archie reside after leaving the United States, the series was produced by Casanova Multimedia and Rai Fiction and directed by Riccardo Donna, described at it: Episodi di Nero Wolfe (serie televisiva 2012), and aired May 10, 2012.

== Publication history ==
- 1957, New York: The Viking Press, October 25, 1957, hardcover

In his limited-edition pamphlet, Collecting Mystery Fiction #10, Rex Stout's Nero Wolfe Part II, Otto Penzler describes the first edition of If Death Ever Slept: "Blue cloth, front cover and spine printed with darker blue; rear cover blank. Issued in a mainly black dust wrapper."
In April 2006, Firsts: The Book Collector's Magazine estimated that the first edition of If Death Ever Slept had a value of between $200 and $350. The estimate is for a copy in very good to fine condition in a like dustjacket.

- 1957, London, Ontario: Macmillan, 1957, hardcover
- 1958, New York: Viking (Mystery Guild), January 1958, hardcover

The far less valuable Viking book club edition may be distinguished from the first edition in three ways:

- The dust jacket has "Book Club Edition" printed on the inside front flap, and the price is absent (first editions may be price clipped if they were given as gifts).
- Book club editions are sometimes thinner and always taller (usually a quarter of an inch) than first editions.
- Book club editions are bound in cardboard, and first editions are bound in cloth (or have at least a cloth spine).

- 1958, London: Collins Crime Club, September 18, 1958, hardcover
- 1959, New York: Bantam #A-1961, August 1959, paperback
- 1960, London: Fontana, 1960, paperback
- 1971, Leicester, England: F.A. Thorpe, Ltd., December 1971
- 1973, New York: Viking Press, Three Trumps: A Nero Wolfe Omnibus (with The Black Mountain and Before Midnight), April 1973, hardcover
- 1995, New York: Bantam Books ISBN 0-553-76296-6 January 2, 1995, paperback
- 2002, Auburn, California; The Audio Partners Publishing Corp., Mystery Masters ISBN 0-553-76296-6 March 12, 2002, audio cassette (unabridged, read by Michael Prichard)
- 2010, New York: Bantam Crimeline ISBN 978-0-307-75600-8 May 12, 2010, e-book
