= Onion John =

1959 children's novel by Joseph Krumgold

- First edition
- Author: Joseph Krumgold
- Illustrator: Symeon Shimin
- Language: English
- Genre: Children's literature
- Publisher: Thomas Y. Crowell
- Publication date: 1959
- Publication place: United States
- Media type: Print (hardback & paperback)
- ISBN: 0-06-440144-8
- OCLC: 29858305

Onion John is a novel by American writer Joseph Krumgold, published in 1959. It was the winner of the 1960 Newbery Medal. The story is set in 1950s New Jersey, and tells the story of 12-year-old Andy Rusch and his friendship with an eccentric hermit who lives on the outskirts of the small town of Serenity.

== Plot summary ==
Onion John is an unusual man: a European immigrant who lives in a hut made of stone and furnished with bathtubs. He befriends young Andy Rusch, the only person in Serenity who can understand his speech. As Andy comes to know Onion John (so named because he grows the best onions in town, and eats them like apples), he finds that the man believes some odd things. In Onion John's world, friendly spirits live in the clouds, and evil spirits can be banished by smoking them out. His needs are few, since the townspeople are happy to give him castoff clothing after someone dies, and he earns a little money by doing odd jobs around Serenity. Andy and his friends are always happy to go along with whatever Onion John says.

Life turns upside-down for Onion John when Andy's father decides to get the Rotary Club to build Onion John a new modern home, complete with electricity, running water, stove, and only one bathtub. The whole town signs on, committees are created, and the house goes up on the site of John's old stone hut. Almost immediately after moving in, John, unused to modern appliances, leaves newspaper on the stove. The ensuing fire destroys the house. Mr. Rusch is determined to rebuild the house, never noticing that Onion John was uncomfortable and unhappy in his new surroundings. He wants to fumigate the whole town. Andy suggests to Onion John that for the people of Serenity to leave him alone, he should run away from town. However, Andy wants to run away with him. Onion John eventually leaves the town of Serenity.

== Reception ==
Kirkus Reviews said of the book: "Joseph Krumgold, author of And Now, Miguel, brings to the dimensions of childhood an understanding born of a truly mature and rich understanding [sic]. Here is sentiment without sentimentality, invention without deception." In a retrospective essay about the Newbery Medal-winning books from 1956 to 1965, librarian Carolyn Horovitz wrote: "Onion John does not appear to me to be a work for children but instead, a 'teaching' story, a parable, aimed at parents."

== Awards and nominations ==
- Newbery Medal 1960
- Notable Children's Books of 1940 -1970 (ALA)
- Lewis Carroll Shelf Award 1960

Awards
Preceded by The Witch of Blackbird Pond	Newbery Medal recipient 1960	Succeeded by Island of the Blue Dolphins
