= The Black Mountain (novel) =

1954 novel by Rex Stout

- Author: Rex Stout
- Cover artist: Bill English
- Language: English
- Series: Nero Wolfe
- Genre: Detective fiction
- Publisher: Viking Press
- Publication date: October 14, 1954
- Publication place: United States
- Media type: Print (hardback)
- Pages: 183 pp. (first edition)
- OCLC: 1391741
- Preceded by: Three Men Out
- Followed by: Before Midnight

The Black Mountain is a Nero Wolfe detective novel by Rex Stout, first published by Viking Press in 1954. The story was also collected in the omnibus volume Three Trumps (Viking 1955).

This book and the pre-war novel Over My Dead Body both involve international intrigue over Montenegro, but under very different circumstances, first concerning Nazi designs on the Balkans, and later in the context of Josip Broz Tito's Yugoslavia.

== Plot introduction ==
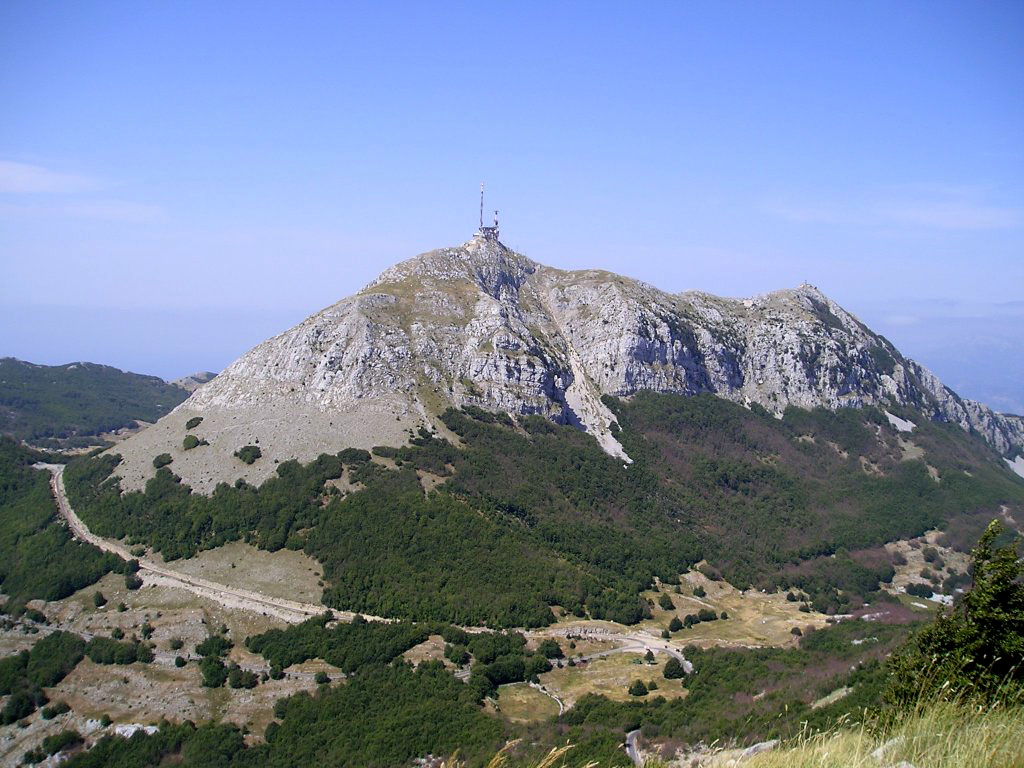
Montenegro is a name that means "black mountain" in many Romance languages. The native name for the place is Crna Gora. The origin of the name 'Black Mountain' is still a matter of debate among historians.

The Black Mountain. Mount Lovchen. Tsernagora. Montenegro, which is the Venetian variant of Monte Nero, and your name is Nero. It may be only a coincidence, but it's natural for a trained detective —

— Archie Goodwin to Nero Wolfe, in Over My Dead Body, chapter 1

In The Black Mountain, Nero Wolfe's oldest friend and fellow Montenegrin Marko Vukcic is murdered by a Yugoslavian agent who has already made his escape from New York. Without hesitation, Wolfe is compelled to go back to his homeland to avenge Marko's death and bring the killer back to American justice; this desire is intensified by the news that Carla Britten, Wolfe's adopted daughter, has also been killed. As they covertly negotiate through one of the most dangerous places on earth, Archie sees Wolfe as the man of action he used to be, and gets a little culture-shock: In these strange lands, Nero replaces Archie as the expert operator.

In Over My Dead Body (1940), Wolfe plays a part in impeding the control of Bosnia and Croatia by Nazi Germany. In The Black Mountain, Marko's nephew is part of a subversive group to gain Montenegro's independence from Yugoslavia. In 1953, such a concept was unrealistic, but supported by the guerrilla formations of komite and Zelenaši. Montenegro became an independent republic in 2006.

== Plot ==
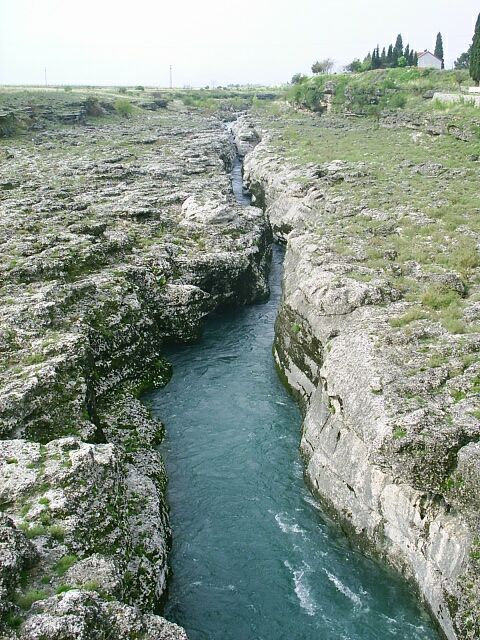
I remembered that one evening after dinner I had heard Wolfe and Marko discussing the trout they had caught in their early days, Marko claiming he had once landed one 40 centimeters long, and I had translated it into inches — 16. I swiveled my head to ask Wolfe if it was in the Cijevna that he and Marko had got trout, and he said yes, but in a tone of voice that did not invite conversation, so I let it lie. — Archie Goodwin, chapter 3

As Archie is about to leave the brownstone for a basketball game, Sergeant Purley Stebbins calls with news that Wolfe's old friend Marko Vukcic has been shot and killed. After Archie identifies the body, Wolfe joins him at the morgue and insists on being taken first to the crime scene and then Rusterman's Restaurant, owned by Marko.

Wolfe and Inspector Cramer question the employees there, and Wolfe and Archie return to the brownstone to find a surprise visitor: Wolfe's adopted daughter Carla. She and Marko have been involved in a movement to secure Montenegro's independence from Yugoslavia, and she is furious at Wolfe's refusal to support the effort. Wolfe tries to question her, but she is reluctant to give any information, since she believes that he may be in league with the government of Yugoslavia or the Soviet Union.

During the three weeks following the murder, Wolfe pursues various lines of investigation and gets a second visit from Carla, enraged that the police are now looking into the movement's background. Following this meeting, he gets three updates from Paolo Telesio, an informant in Bari, Italy. The first states that Carla has returned to Bari and crossed the Adriatic Sea into Montenegro; the second is a cryptic message on the killer's location — "the man you seek is within sight of the mountain"; the last states that Carla has been killed. Realizing that "the mountain" must be Lovćen in Montenegro, Wolfe makes immediate plans to go there and find Marko's killer, accompanied by Archie.

The two fly to Europe, making their way to Bari and taking temporary shelter in a house owned by one of Telesio's friends. Telesio arranges for a guide to ferry them across the Adriatic; from there, the two hike through the foothills of Lovćen and eventually secure a ride to Rijeka Crnojevića and then Podgorica. Jubé Bilic, a college student, drives them to Podgorica and drops them off at the office of Gospo Stritar, the local police chief. Wolfe gives a fake name and passes himself off as a Montenegro native who has lived abroad for many years and is now returning to decide which side to support in the struggle over Yugoslavia's future, and Archie as his American-born son (to explain his inability to speak Serbo-Croat).

Although Stritar is skeptical of Wolfe's explanation, he allows the two to go about their business, but dispatches Jubé to follow them. Wolfe and Archie travel to the home of Marko's nephew Danilo, who had passed the messages on to Telesio and who has been helping Marko and Carla smuggle weapons and supplies in from the United States. Danilo learns of Jubé's surveillance and has him killed, then reluctantly agrees to take Wolfe and Archie into the mountains for a meeting with Josip Pasic, one member of a guerrilla team in the independence movement. From Pasic, Wolfe learns that Carla had begun to suspect that a spy had infiltrated the group; she slipped into Albania to infiltrate a Russian-controlled fort and gather information, only to be killed instead.

Wolfe and Archie sneak into the fort, where they hear screams coming from one room. Inside, they discover Peter Zov, a man they had previously seen in Stritar's office, being tortured by three Russians. Their leader berates Zov for going to New York and killing Marko on Stritar's orders, hampering Russia's goal of taking over Yugoslavia if the Tito regime is overthrown. Carla had gained the favor of the other two Russians; when they realized who she was, they killed her.

Wolfe and Archie storm the room, and Archie kills the Russians and frees Zov. The gun he used to kill Marko is found elsewhere in the fort, and Wolfe makes up his mind to take him back to New York to face justice rather than exact revenge immediately. Once the three have returned to Podgorica, Wolfe pretends to have decided to commit himself to the Tito regime and offers Stritar a large bribe in support of it. Stritar produces a letter (a fake sent by Telesio as a red herring) which states that "Nero Wolfe" will be remaining in New York and sending funds to support the independence movement. Zov is dispatched to assassinate him as an associate of Marko.

The three return to Italy, where Wolfe and Archie arrange a trans-Atlantic ship voyage under their assumed names and Zov comes aboard as a steward. Wolfe insists on having Zov brought to the brownstone so that he can reveal himself on the spot. When the ship pulls into the New York harbor, though, a news photographer spots Wolfe on the deck and calls his name. Zov draws his gun and shoots Wolfe, wounding him in the leg before being tackled by the rest of the staff. Satisfied that both murders can now be closed, Wolfe tells Archie to call Cramer.

== Cast of characters ==
- Nero Wolfe — Private investigator
- Archie Goodwin — Wolfe's agent and assistant
- Marko Vukcic — Wolfe's oldest friend
- Carla Britton, formerly Lovchen - Wolfe's adopted daughter
- Danilo Vukcic - Marko's nephew, living in Montenegro
- Josip Pasic - Member of a Montenegrin independence movement
- Gospo Stritar - Local police chief in Montenegro
- Peter Zov - An associate of Stritar
- Stahl - Senior FBI official in New York
- Geoffrey Hitchcock - Wolfe's contact in London
- Richard Courtney - Official from US embassy in Rome
- Paolo Telesio - Wolfe's contact in Bari
- Guido Battista - Telesio's contact from Yugoslavia

== Reviews and commentary ==
- Anthony Boucher, The New York Times Book Review (October 24, 1954) — It's good to see that so well-established a professional as Rex Stout can still venture into new fields ... In The Black Mountain he tries something completely new in the Nero Wolfe canon by routing Wolfe out of West 35th Street and sending him into the mountainous wilderness of Montenegro. ... All who were fascinated by Bernard DeVoto's searching venture into 35th Street Irregularity in the July Harper's will welcome the flood of new data on Wolfe's ambiguous Balkan background.
- Detectionary — Wolfe adopts a disguise to deal with sinister international intriguers and to cope with an enemy to whom murder is trivial.
- Sergeant Cuff, Saturday Review of Literature (November 27, 1954) — Nero Wolfe flies to Montenegro (that's right) to solve NY killing; Archie tags along. Radical departure from tested routine develops into swell yarn. OK all the way.
- James Sandoe, New York Herald Tribune (October 24, 1954) — Archie's reporting is entertaining (it always is) and the goings on are something fierce and often pretty funny, especially when the self-indulgent Nero is behaving like a mountain goat with sore feet.

== Publication history ==
- 1954, New York: Viking Press, October 14, 1954, hardcover

In his limited-edition pamphlet, Collecting Mystery Fiction #9, Rex Stout's Nero Wolfe Part I, Otto Penzler describes the first edition of The Black Mountain: "Black cloth, front cover printed with yellow design; spine printed with yellow lettering; rear cover blank. Issued in a black, white, yellow and red dust wrapper."
In April 2006, Firsts: The Book Collector's Magazine estimated that the first edition of The Black Mountain had a value of between $200 and $350. The estimate is for a copy in very good to fine condition in a like dustjacket.

- 1955, New York: Viking Press (Mystery Guild), January 1955, hardcover

The far less valuable Viking book club edition may be distinguished from the first edition in three ways:

- The dust jacket has "Book Club Edition" printed on the inside front flap, and the price is absent (first editions may be price clipped if they were given as gifts).
- Book club editions are sometimes thinner and always taller (usually a quarter of an inch) than first editions.
- Book club editions are bound in cardboard, and first editions are bound in cloth (or have at least a cloth spine).

- 1955, London: Collins Crime Club, August 22, 1955, hardcover
- 1955, New York: Bantam #1386, November 1955, paperback
- 1971, London: Hamish Hamilton, 1971, hardcover
- 1973, New York: Viking Press, Three Trumps: A Nero Wolfe Omnibus (with If Death Ever Slept and Before Midnight), April 1973, hardcover
- 1988, New York: Bantam Crimeline ISBN 0-553-27291-8 July 1, 1988, paperback
- 2006, Auburn, California: The Audio Partners Publishing Corp., Mystery Masters ISBN 1-57270-545-0 August 28, 2006 [1997], audio CD (unabridged, read by Michael Prichard)
- 2011, New York: Bantam Crimeline ISBN 978-0-307-76822-3 August 17, 2011, e-book
