= The Scarlet Letters =

1953 novel

- First US edition
- Author: Ellery Queen
- Language: English
- Series: Ellery Queen mysteries
- Genre: Mystery novel / Whodunnit
- Publisher: Little, Brown (US); Gollancz (UK)
- Publication date: 1953
- Publication place: United States
- Media type: Print (hardback & paperback)
- Preceded by: The King is Dead
- Followed by: The Glass Village

The Scarlet Letters is an English language novel published in 1953 by Ellery Queen. Ellery Queen was a joint pseudonym created in 1928 by the American detective fiction writers Frederic Dannay (1905–1982) and Manfred Bennington Lee (1905–1971). The Scarlet Letters is a mystery novel set primarily in New York City.

== Plot summary ==
Dirk and Martha Lawrence are apparently not the happiest couple in New York, despite her millions of dollars and his fairly successful mystery-writing career. Martha asks for a secretive meeting to get advice from Ellery Queen (also the name of the authors' main fictional detective) because Dirk's violent jealousy is causing problems in her life—but Dirk shows up suspecting the worst and punches Ellery into unconsciousness. Dirk apologizes the next day, telling the story of how his father had killed his mother's lover, thereby causing his over-reaction. Ellery's secretary and inamorata Nikki Porter urges him to stay involved in the situation and Nikki moves in with the Lawrences to keep an eye on things (and act as Dirk's secretary on a stalled book). Nikki soon reports that Martha actually is having a series of clandestine meetings with romantic actor Van Harrison. The meetings are arranged with innocuous envelopes that look like advertising, but with Martha's name and address written in scarlet typewriter ink. Also, the envelopes contain only a day, time and a sequential letter of the alphabet—a code that is soon linked to a New York Guidebook. By the time the meetings have progressed from "A" through to "W", Dirk has found out about the affair and followed Martha to Van's home in the suburb of Darien. He breaks in, confronts the pair and shoots them both, seriously wounding Martha, who nearly dies. Van Harrison has just enough time before he dies to leave a dying clue—using his own blood, he writes an "X", then a "Y" on the wall, and dies. Ellery must consider the significance of this dying message and finally solves it, just as Dirk's murder trial is about to conclude. After Ellery gets a private conversation with the judge, a criminal then receives justice.

== Literary significance and criticism ==
After numerous popular mystery novels, a radio program and a number of movies, the character of Ellery Queen was at this point firmly established. This novel is more frank about sexual matters than earlier Queen works (for instance, in 1942's Calamity Town, the possibility of extramarital sex is referred to entirely in euphemisms). The plot device of the "dying clue" had been used in Queen's short stories but this is the first novel that relies on such a device.
