= La Boîte à merveilles =

Book by Ahmed Sefrioui

- Author: Ahmed Sefrioui
- Language: French
- Genre: Autobiographical novel
- Publisher: Editions du Seuil
- Publication date: 1954
- Publication place: Morocco
- Pages: 184

La Boîte à merveilles is an autobiographical 1954 novel by Moroccan writer Ahmed Sefrioui. The novel was long considered the first Moroccan novel written in French under the French Protectorate, before Abdelkader Chatt’s Mosaïques ternies, published in 1932 by Revue mondiale, was rehabilitated and recognized.

== Background ==
It was long thought to be the first mainstream Moroccan novel written in the French language. The novel presents a slice of life within the context of North African Francophone literature of the century.

The book follows the Maghreb tradition of an autobiographical style, written in the first person. It explores, through an adult's memories of commonplace events in his childhood, his perception and emotional relationship with his parents. Surrounded by the love, passion and drama of life, in quiet times the boy can always return to his secret box of marvels. The novel has been recognized by critics as exceptional in style and content. It has been described as a classic work.

The novel has been used as a vehicle for teaching French to students of Maghrebian origin, since they can more easily relate to the experiences of the author than they would to books written by and about French people.

Extracts from the book have been used for the first year Baccalauréat examinations by the French and Moroccan ministries of Education.

== Plot ==
The narrator (now an adult) tells of his childhood. At the start of the novel he describes how as a young boy he was plagued by loneliness and spent much of his time in solitude. He then presents the tenants of Dar Chouafa: Lalla Kenza the seer (ground floor), Driss El Aouad, his wife Rahma and their daughter Zineb (first floor), and fatma Bziouya the second floor). He evokes memories of the Moorish Bath and his "box of wonders" where he keeps special objects that he finds, which give him comfort. Then he recalls a dispute between his mother and Rahma.

Returning from m'sid (school), the narrator finds his mother unwell. Lalla Aicha, her friend, visits and convinces her to see Sidi Boughaleb. During the visit, Sidi Mohamed gets scratched by a cat. Tired, the child doesn’t go to m'sid the next day and instead describes the morning routine at home, the origins of his parents, and his memories of the unpleasant Driss, his father’s apprentice.

The narrator recounts his day at m'sid. In the evening, when noticing that Fatima Bziouiya uses an oil lamp, Lalla Zoubida insists that her husband buy one the next day. He then narrates the disappearance of Zineb and how his mother found her at the Idrissides' home. As a gesture of gratitude to God, Rahma prepares a meal for beggars, and all the neighbors join in with goodwill.

At the beginning of spring, Lalla Msirina and her son visit Lalla Aicha. Sidi Mohamed takes the opportunity to play with the neighbor’s children. Lalla Aicha tells her friend about her husband’s misfortunes with his partner Abdelkader. The next day, the mother retells the story to her husband, which prompts young Sidi Mohamed to remember the grocer Abdellah who would tell him stories.

On a Wednesday, the Fqih explains his plans for Ashura to his students. At home, Lalla Zoubida tirelessly recounts Lalla Aicha’s misfortunes to Fatima and Rahma, making them promise to keep it secret. The narrator then recalls the death of Sidi Tahar Ben Billion, a scene he witnessed that gave him nightmares.

During preparations for Ashura at m'sid, the Fqih organizes the work and forms teams. Young Sidi Mohamed is appointed head of the brushes. The next morning, he accompanies his mother to the kissaria to buy a new jacket. Back home, Sidi Mohamed argues with Zineb. His mother gets angry. Sad and hungry, the child escapes into his dreams. The narrator then shares the story of Lalla Khadija and her husband’s uncle Othman, as told by Rhima to the neighbors.

On the eve of Ashura, the women buy drums and a trumpet for Sidi Mohamed. He participates in the m'sid preparations for the feast. The next day, he accompanies his father to the barber, where he listens without much interest to adult conversations.

On Ashura, the child wakes up early, puts on his new clothes, and goes to m'sid to celebrate the special day. After the meal, Lalla Aicha visits the narrator's family. After Ashura, life returns to its routine. But with the first warm days, the mother declares war on bedbugs. One day, the narrator's father decides to take his wife and son to the souk to buy jewelry bracelets. Fatma Bziouya accompanies the family. When they arrive at the jeweler’s souk, the father’s face is bloody from a fight with a broker. Superstitious, Lalla Zoubida refuses the bracelets, thinking they are cursed. Mother Lalla Aicha recounts the misadventures at the souk. Sidi Mohamed falls ill.

The father loses all his capital. He decides to sell the bracelets and go to work around Fez. Sidi Mohamed is still suffering from fever. The father’s departure is seen as a great tragedy. One day, the mother visits her friend Lalla Aicha, who suggests consulting a soothsayer, Si el Arafi. The narrator recalls seeing Si el Arafi. Lalla Zoubida returns home, keeping the visit a secret, and decides to keep her child at home, taking him to visit a marabout each week.

One morning, she is visited by a messenger from her husband. Lalla Aicha asks her friend to visit the next day because she has something to tell her.

At Lalla Aicha’s, the women talk. Salama visits and recounts her role in the marriage of Larbi’s daughter, the hairdresser, and the problems of the new couple.

In the last chapter, the narrator recounts his father’s return. Sidi Mohamed tells his father about the events that occurred during his absence. The narrator's father learns that M. Larbi broke up with his young wife. Sidi Mohamed, still an introverted dreamer, takes out his box of wonders, lulled by his dreams.

== Main characters ==
- Sidi Mohamed, the narrator, a young boy (6 years old) who lives with his parents on the second floor of Dar Chouafa, the house of Aunt Kenza, the fortune teller.
- Lalla (Mrs.) Zoubida, mother of Sidi Mohammed.
- Maalam Abdeslam, father of Sidi Mohammed, a weaver by trade.
- Aunt Kenza, the Chouafa (fortune teller), who lives on the ground floor and is the main tenant of Dar Chouafa.
- Driss El Aouad, plow maker, husband of Rahma, and father of their young daughter, Zineb (7 years old). The family occupies the first floor of Dar Chouafa.
- Fatma Bziouya and her husband Allal, a gardener, are neighbors of Sidi Mohamed's family on the second floor of Dar Chouafa.
- Lalla Aicha, former neighbor of Lalla Zoubida.
- The Fqih, Sidi Mohammed's strict schoolteacher, a bearded man who also appears in the boy's nightmares.
