= The Queen Is Dead (disambiguation) =

The Queen Is Dead is the third studio album by The Smiths.

The Queen Is Dead may also refer to:

- "The Queen Is Dead" (song), the album's title track
  - Death and state funeral of Elizabeth II, which the song refers to
- "The Queen Is Dead" (Once Upon a Time), the fifteenth episode of the second season of Once Upon a Time
- The queen is dead, long live the queen!, a traditional proclamation made following the accession of a new monarch

== See also ==
- The King Is Dead (disambiguation)
