= The Zero Clue =

- Short story by Rex Stout
- Original title: Scared to Death
- Country: United States
- Language: English
- Genre: Detective fiction

Publication
- Published in: The American Magazine
- Publication type: Periodical
- Publication date: December 1953
- Series: Nero Wolfe

"The Zero Clue" is a Nero Wolfe mystery novella by Rex Stout, first published as "Scared to Death" in the December 1953 issue of The American Magazine. It first appeared in book form in the short-story collection Three Men Out, published by the Viking Press in 1954.

== Plot summary ==
Leo Heller, a mathematics expert who uses his knowledge of probability to assist his clients with their problems, tries to hire Wolfe for a difficult case. He believes that one of his clients may have committed a crime, but does not want to tell the police of his suspicions without evidence to back them up. Wolfe angrily refuses the job, remembering a past incident in which he lost a client to Heller, but Archie offers to stop by the next day for a preliminary discussion.

The following morning, Archie goes to Heller's private office at the agreed-on time but finds it empty, with the door open. Taking note of several pencils lying in an unusual pattern on the desk, he asks the five clients in the waiting room if any of them have seen Heller in person, but all of them say no. That evening, Inspector Cramer arrives at the brownstone with news that Heller has been found dead, shot through the heart and stuffed into his office closet. Accounts of Heller's movements suggest that he was killed shortly before Archie entered the office.

The arrangement of the pencils on Leo Heller's desk, with one eraser torn off and placed between the groups.

Cramer demands to know Wolfe's involvement in the case for two reasons: an envelope in Heller's desk, marked with Wolfe's name and containing $500 cash; and the pencils, whose pattern he re-creates as best he can. Archie corrects it slightly, tearing the eraser off one pencil and placing it in the middle of the pattern. Cramer is convinced that they stand for Wolfe's initials when viewed from the side, even though one grouping has too many strokes to form a W. Wolfe dismisses Cramer's claims, keeps the $500, and briefly looks through a book from his shelves before locking it in a desk drawer. He asks Cramer to bring in Heller's five clients as well as Susan Maturo, a woman who had left Heller's building just as Archie entered to meet with him, and urges Cramer to watch for instances of the number six.

Wolfe and Cramer question these six people one by one, learning of their various reasons for wanting to see Heller. They take a particular interest in Susan, a nurse who had worked in a hospital where a bomb exploded a month earlier, killing 302 people. She had thought of hiring Heller to find the culprit, but changed her mind at the last minute and began to think of hiring Wolfe instead. The number six figures in every person's account, but a remark by one client – about Heller's winning tip on a racehorse named Zero – prompts Wolfe to have everyone brought back to his office.

With the pencils laid out on his desk as they were on Heller's, Wolfe explains that the book he consulted earlier was on the history of mathematics. The two groups of pencils were arranged to symbolize a three and a two, and he originally assumed that the eraser between them stood for multiplication; hence his focus on the number six. However, the mention of the horse's name made him realize that the eraser was meant to stand for a zero. Before he was killed, Heller had laid out the pencils to form the number 302 – the death toll in the hospital bombing.

Aside from Susan, the only client with any substantial connection to that hospital is Jack Ennis, an inventor who had unsuccessfully tried to persuade the staff to use a new X-ray machine he had designed. Wolfe conjectures that he set the bomb as revenge for this rejection, learned that Heller might have become suspicious enough to call in Wolfe, and killed him. As Ennis is placed under arrest, Archie reassures Susan that he is guilty, and a jury reaches the same conclusion at his trial two months later.

== The unfamiliar word ==
"Nero Wolfe talks in a way that no human being on the face of the earth has ever spoken, with the possible exception of Rex Stout after he had a gin and tonic," said Michael Jaffe, executive producer of the A&E TV series, A Nero Wolfe Mystery. "Readers of the Wolfe saga often have to turn to the dictionary because of the erudite vocabulary of Wolfe and sometimes of Archie," wrote Rev. Frederick G. Gotwald.

Nero Wolfe's vocabulary is one of the hallmarks of the character. Examples of unfamiliar words — or unfamiliar uses of words that some would otherwise consider familiar — are found throughout the corpus, often in the give-and-take between Wolfe and Archie.

- Sennight, chapter 6. Spoken not by Wolfe but by a Runyonesque racetrack tout.

== Publication history ==
=== "The Zero Clue" ===
- 1953, The American Magazine, December 1953 (as "Scared to Death")
- 1963, Ellery Queen's Mystery Magazine, April 1963
- 1970, Ellery Queen's Anthology, Mid-year 1970
- 1972, Ellery Queen's Best Bets, ed. by Ellery Queen, New York: Pyramid #N2775, August 1972
- 1976, Masterpieces of Mystery: The Supersleuths, ed. by Ellery Queen, New York: Davis Publications, 1976

=== Three Men Out ===
- 1954, New York: The Viking Press, March 26, 1954, hardcover

Contents include "Invitation to Murder", "The Zero Clue" and "This Won't Kill You".
In his limited-edition pamphlet, Collecting Mystery Fiction #9, Rex Stout's Nero Wolfe Part I, Otto Penzler describes the first edition of Three Men Out: "Red boards, front cover blank. Issued in a red, black and white dust wrapper. … The binding of this title was a textured cardboard designed to resemble cloth; the book club edition has a smoother texture."
In April 2006, Firsts: The Book Collector's Magazine estimated that the first edition of Three Men Out had a value of between $200 and $350. The estimate is for a copy in very good to fine condition in a like dustjacket.

- 1954, New York: Viking (Mystery Guild), June 1954, hardcover

The far less valuable Viking book club edition may be distinguished from the first edition in three ways:

- The dust jacket has "Book Club Edition" printed on the inside front flap, and the price is absent (first editions may be price clipped if they were given as gifts).
- Book club editions are sometimes thinner and always taller (usually a quarter of an inch) than first editions.
- Book club editions are bound in cardboard, and first editions are bound in cloth (or have at least a cloth spine).

- 1955, London: Collins Crime Club, January 17, 1955, hardcover
- 1955, Toronto: Macmillan, 1955, hardcover
- 1955, New York: Bantam #1388, November 1955, paperback
- 1991, New York: Bantam Crimeline ISBN 0-553-24547-3 June 1, 1991, paperback
- 1994, New York: Bantam Crimeline ISBN 0-553-24547-3 May 1994, paperback, Rex Stout Library edition with introduction by Linda Ellerbee
- 1997, Newport Beach, California: Books on Tape, Inc. ISBN 0-7366-3749-4 July 21, 1997, audio cassette (unabridged, read by Michael Prichard)
- 2011, New York: Bantam Crimeline ISBN 978-0-307-76816-2 August 17, 2011, e-book
