= Three Men Out =

Collection of novellas by Rex Stout

- Author: Rex Stout
- Cover artist: Bill English
- Language: English
- Series: Nero Wolfe
- Genre: Detective fiction
- Publisher: Viking Press
- Publication date: March 26, 1954
- Publication place: United States
- Media type: Print (hardcover)
- Pages: 181 pp. (first edition)
- OCLC: 5743510
- Preceded by: The Golden Spiders
- Followed by: The Black Mountain

Three Men Out is a collection of Nero Wolfe mystery novellas by Rex Stout, published by the Viking Press in 1954. The book comprises three stories that first appeared in The American Magazine:

- "Invitation to Murder" (August 1953, as "Will to Murder")
- "The Zero Clue" (December 1953, as "Scared to Death")
- "This Won't Kill You" (September 1952, as "This Will Kill You")

== Publication history ==
- 1954, New York: The Viking Press, March 26, 1954, hardcover

In his limited-edition pamphlet, Collecting Mystery Fiction #9, Rex Stout's Nero Wolfe Part I, Otto Penzler describes the first edition of Three Men Out: "Red boards, front cover blank. Issued in a red, black and white dust wrapper. … The binding of this title was a textured cardboard designed to resemble cloth; the book club edition has a smoother texture."
In April 2006, Firsts: The Book Collector's Magazine estimated that the first edition of Three Men Out had a value of between $200 and $350. The estimate is for a copy in very good to fine condition in a like dustjacket.

- 1954, New York: Viking (Mystery Guild), June 1954, hardcover

The far less valuable Viking book club edition may be distinguished from the first edition in three ways:

- The dust jacket has "Book Club Edition" printed on the inside front flap, and the price is absent (first editions may be price clipped if they were given as gifts).
- Book club editions are sometimes thinner and always taller (usually a quarter of an inch) than first editions.
- Book club editions are bound in cardboard, and first editions are bound in cloth (or have at least a cloth spine).

- 1955, London: Collins Crime Club, January 17, 1955, hardcover
- 1955, Toronto: Macmillan, 1955, hardcover
- 1955, New York: Bantam #1388, November 1955, paperback
- 1980, New York: Bantam Crimeline ISBN 0-553-13666-6 August 1980, seventh printing, paperback
- 1991, New York: Bantam Crimeline ISBN 0-553-24547-3 June 1, 1991, paperback
- 1994, New York: Bantam Crimeline ISBN 0-553-24547-3 May 1994, paperback, Rex Stout Library edition with introduction by Linda Ellerbee
- 1997, Newport Beach, California: Books on Tape, Inc. ISBN 0-7366-3749-4 July 21, 1997, audio cassette (unabridged, read by Michael Prichard)
- 2011, New York: Bantam Crimeline ISBN 978-0-307-76816-2 August 17, 2011, e-book
