= There Was an Old Woman (novel) =

1943 novel by Ellery Queen

There Was an Old Woman (also published as The Quick and the Dead)
- First US edition
- Author: Ellery Queen
- Language: English
- Series: Ellery Queen mysteries
- Genre: Mystery
- Publisher: Little, Brown (US); Gollancz (UK)
- Publication date: 1943 (US); 1944 (UK)
- Publication place: United States
- Media type: Print (hardcover and paperback)
- Preceded by: Calamity Town
- Followed by: The Murderer is a Fox

There Was an Old Woman is a novel published in 1943 by Ellery Queen, byname of American writers Manfred B. Lee and Frederic Dannay. It is a mystery novel primarily set in New York City, US.

== Plot summary ==
Mrs. Cornelia Potts is the elderly matriarch of the Potts family, and their large fortune was earned by the manufacture of shoes, so when a murder mystery takes place at their New York estate, it's not surprising that the newspapers refer frequently to "the Old Woman Who Lived in a Shoe". Cornelia has had two husbands—one deceased, one living in the household—and three children by each. Her children by her first husband are all extremely eccentric. Thurlow Potts engages in dozens of lawsuits to protect the family honor; Louella believes herself to be a great chemist and inventor, a sentiment shared by no one else; and Horatio, an adult, is determined to live the lifestyle of a child of six. By contrast, her other three children by her second husband are relatively sane—the twins Robert and Maclyn, who run the business, and the beautiful Sheila. Thurlow's lawyer Charley Paxton is engaged to Sheila and invites Ellery Queen to dinner at the Potts mansion to meet the family. Thurlow challenges Robert to a duel, using revolvers from which the bullets have been carefully extracted but, when the duel is fought, Robert is shot dead because the bullets have been returned to the gun. Next, his twin Maclyn is shot in his bed, and the body is found with whip marks on his face next to a dish of broth. As Ellery postulates that the murders are somehow tied to the nursery rhyme, the next death is that of the Old Woman herself. She dies of heart failure and leaves behind a confession to the first two murders. It is only at the marriage of Charley and Sheila that Ellery finally realizes the truth of the bizarre events and unmasks the real criminal.

== Literary significance and criticism ==
After many popular mystery novels, a radio program and a number of movies, the character of Ellery Queen was at this point firmly established. This novel returns to the unrealistic puzzle-mystery format of earlier years, in which realism in characterization and plotting is sacrificed to the need to make events fit into the nursery-rhyme format. At the end of the novel, Sheila announces that, in order to escape the stigma associated with her heritage, she is changing her name to "Nikki Porter"; Nikki Porter is Ellery's romantic interest that was developed in radio and film but not seen in novels before this time.
