= The Golden Spiders =

1953 novel by Rex Stout

- Author: Rex Stout
- Cover artist: Bill English
- Language: English
- Series: Nero Wolfe
- Genre: Detective fiction
- Publisher: Viking Press
- Publication date: October 26, 1953
- Publication place: United States
- Media type: Print (hardcover)
- Pages: 186 pp. (first edition)
- OCLC: 1391763
- Preceded by: Prisoner's Base
- Followed by: Three Men Out

The Golden Spiders is a Nero Wolfe detective novel by Rex Stout. It was first published in 1953 by The Viking Press.

== Plot introduction ==
His fist hit the desk, which for him was a convulsion. "No!" he roared. "Reputation? Am I to invite the comment that it is a mortal hazard to solicit my help? On Tuesday, that boy. On Friday, that woman. They are both dead. I will not have my office converted into an anteroom for the morgue!"

— Wolfe, declining to give Lon Cohen a human interest story, in The Golden Spiders, chapter 5

A youngster comes to Wolfe's office and tells Wolfe that he saw a woman driving a car, apparently being menaced by her passenger. The next day, the boy is murdered while washing car windows at a nearby intersection.

== Plot summary ==
After Nero Wolfe reacts petulantly to a change in one of his favourite meals, Archie Goodwin plays a prank on him by allowing Pete Drossos, a neighbourhood child, to enter and ask for Wolfe’s help on a case. Pete claims that while he was washing the windows of car at a stop light the driver, a woman wearing distinctive golden earrings in the shape of spiders, silently asked him to summon a police officer, and Pete believes she was being threatened by her male passenger. To indulge Pete, Wolfe has Archie pass Pete’s information on to the police, but the next day they learn that the same car, now driven by a man in a brown suit and hat, has struck and killed Pete. Matthew Birch, an agent of the Immigration and Naturalization Service, was also struck and killed by the same car, apparently on the same day that Pete approached Wolfe. While this suggests Birch was the man Pete saw in the car evidence at the scene proves Birch was killed before Pete, ruling him out as Pete's murderer.

Wolfe is visited by Pete’s mother, who gives them his savings of $4.30 and asks them to use it to find his killer. Archie, angered at Wolfe’s reluctance to get involved, puts an advertisement in the newspaper, asking the woman in the car to contact Wolfe. Laura Fromm, a wealthy widow, responds to the advertisement and arrives at Wolfe’s house wearing the golden spider earrings. Wolfe and Archie quickly determine that she is not the person they seek, but she is horrified on learning of Pete’s death and claims that she may know who was driving. Fromm refuses to reveal the information, but the next day Wolfe and Archie receive news that she too has been struck by a car and killed. Infuriated by the fact that two people who came to him for help are now dead, Wolfe decides to solve the murders.

Archie learns that the last people to see Fromm alive are all directly or indirectly connected to a charity for displaced persons that Fromm supported with sizeable donations. While Wolfe assigns his operatives Saul Panzer, Fred Durkin and Orrie Cather to pursue various leads, Archie approaches those present at a dinner attended by charity officials - including Fromm’s secretary Jean Estey, the charity's attorney Dennis Horan and his wife, and the charity's director Angela Wright - and offers to sell the details of the conversation between Wolfe and Fromm in an attempt to flush out the guilty party. Before he can approach Paul Kuffner, the charity’s public-relations director, Kuffner approaches Wolfe and offers to pay for the information. Realising he has been tipped off, Wolfe rejects the offer.

Saul, who has been posing as a displaced person seeking help from the charity, reveals that after he had approached Horan for help he was subsequently visited by a man who tried to blackmail him out of $10,000. Meanwhile, Fred has tracked down two hoodlums who claim to have been working with Birch. On discovering that Fred is a private investigator they attempt to torture him for information, but Archie, Saul and Orrie — who have been independently following either Fred or the hoodlums — manage to rescue him. Saul confirms that one of the hoodlums, “Lips” Egan, is the blackmailer, and a notebook in his pocket reveals the existence of a blackmail ring targeting poor, illegal immigrants.

Before the investigators can interrogate the hoodlums further, Horan arrives unexpectedly at Egan’s base of operations. Archie takes Horan and the hoodlums to Wolfe’s office, where they are held for questioning by Wolfe and Inspector Cramer. Horan tries to distance himself from the two hoodlums, but Egan confesses to the blackmail and implicates Horan as well. Egan reveals that Birch was one of the ringleaders of the operation, but that he in turn took orders from an unknown woman. This confirms to Wolfe a flawed assumption made by the police: that the driver of the car that killed Pete was a man, when in fact it was a woman disguised as a man.

With the principals and several police officers assembled in his office, Wolfe reveals the identity of the murderer: Fromm’s secretary Jean Estey. Estey was the true mastermind of the blackmail ring, but Fromm had begun to suspect her and, after overhearing the codeword she used - “said a spider to a fly” - had given the spider earrings to Estey as a subtle way of confronting her. Estey murdered Birch when he demanded a larger share of the blackmail proceeds, then killed Pete and Fromm to hide her connections to Birch and the illegal operation. When a clothing store owner brought in by Orrie identifies Estey as having purchased the suit and hat worn by the driver who killed Pete, she is arrested for the murders and Horan and Egan are arrested for the blackmail.

Wolfe burns Egan's notebook to prevent the identities of the blackmail victims from being exposed, leading Archie to worry that he may be charged with destroying evidence, but all three defendants are convicted even without it.

== Cast of characters ==
- Nero Wolfe — The private investigator
- Archie Goodwin — Wolfe's assistant, and the narrator of all Wolfe stories
- Fritz Brenner — Wolfe's master chef
- Pete Drossos — A 12-year-old who lives in Wolfe's neighborhood
- Anthea Drossos — Pete's mother
- Mrs. Damon (Laura) Fromm — Socialite and philanthropist, major supporter of the Association for the Aid of Displaced Persons (Assadip)
- Jean Estey — Mrs. Fromm's personal secretary
- Paul Kuffner — Public-relations consultant for Assadip and for Mrs. Fromm personally
- Angela Wright — Executive Secretary of Assadip
- Dennis Horan — General counsel for Assadip
- Claire Horan — His wife
- Vincent Lipscomb — Editor and publisher of the periodical Modern Thoughts, and friend of Laura Fromm
- James Albert Maddox — Personal counsel for Laura Fromm and executor of her estate
- Matthew Birch — Of the Immigration and Naturalization Service
- Lawrence (Lips) Egan — Organized crime figure
- Mortimer Ervin — Local thug
- Saul Panzer, Fred Durkin and Orrie Cather — Operatives employed by Wolfe
- Lon Cohen — Of the Gazette
- Inspector Cramer and Sergeant Purley Stebbins – Representing Manhattan Homicide

== The unfamiliar word ==
In most Nero Wolfe novels and novellas, there is at least one unfamiliar word, usually spoken by Wolfe. The Golden Spiders contains one, spoken not by Wolfe but by attorney Maddox, and is the sort of legal term that Stout tended to avoid:

- Replevy. Chapter 8.

== Reviews and commentary ==
- Anthony Boucher, The New York Times Book Review (November 15, 1953) — A highly professional and thoroughly satisfactory mystery.
- James Sandoe, New York Herald Tribune (November 8, 1953) — Mr. Stout has fancied his case freshly, heard in acutely and if, after all this, he resolves it a little dully, there is to the last the pleasant acidity of Archie.
- Saturday Review of Literature (November 21, 1953) — Nero Wolfe, armchair eye, solves three-ply killing while NY cops grind teeth. Archie Goodwin, aide, busy boy in this baffler; usual smooth job.

== Adaptations ==

=== The Golden Spiders: A Nero Wolfe Mystery (A&E Network) ===
The A&E Network original movie The Golden Spiders: A Nero Wolfe Mystery first aired March 5, 2000. The Jaffe/Braunstein Films production starred Maury Chaykin as Nero Wolfe, and Timothy Hutton as Archie Goodwin. Veteran screenwriter Paul Monash adapted the novel, and Bill Duke directed.

A&E initially planned that The Golden Spiders would be the first in a series of two-hour mystery movies featuring Nero Wolfe. The high ratings (3.2 million households) garnered by the film, along with the critical praise accorded Maury Chaykin as Nero Wolfe and Timothy Hutton as Archie Goodwin, prompted A&E to order a weekly one-hour drama series — A Nero Wolfe Mystery — into production.

Other members of the principal cast of The Golden Spiders who would continue in the A&E series A Nero Wolfe Mystery include Bill Smitrovich (Inspector Cramer), Colin Fox (Fritz Brenner), Fulvio Cecere (Fred Durkin), R.D. Reid (Sergeant Purley Stebbins) and Trent McMullen (Orrie Cather). Saul Rubinek, who would take the role of Lon Cohen in the series, was cast as Saul Panzer in the pilot.

=== Nero Wolfe (Paramount Television) ===
The Golden Spiders was loosely adapted as the premiere episode of Nero Wolfe (1981), an NBC TV series starring William Conrad as Nero Wolfe and Lee Horsley as Archie Goodwin. Other members of the regular cast include George Voskovec (Fritz Brenner), Robert Coote (Theodore Horstmann), George Wyner (Saul Panzer) and Allan Miller (Inspector Cramer). Guest stars in the series debut include Carlene Watkins (Jean Estey), Penelope Windust (Laura Fromm), Katherine Justice (Angela Bell [Wright]), David Hollander (Pete Drossos) and Liam Sullivan (Paul Kessler [Kuffner]). Directed by Michael O'Herlihy from a teleplay by Wallace Ware (David Karp), "The Golden Spiders" aired January 16, 1981.

=== Nero Wolfe (Radiotelevisione italiana S.p.A.) ===
Roberto Jannone adapted The Golden Spiders for the third episode of the RAI TV series Nero Wolfe (Italy 2012), starring Francesco Pannofino as Nero Wolfe and Pietro Sermonti as Archie Goodwin. Set in 1959 in Rome, where Wolfe and Archie reside after leaving the United States, the series was produced by Casanova Multimedia and Rai Fiction and directed by Riccardo Donna. "La principessa Orchidea" aired April 19, 2012.

== Publication history ==
Fontana's fourth paperback edition features William Conrad, star of the Paramount Television series Nero Wolfe (1981)

- 1953, New York: Viking, October 26, 1953, hardcover
  In his limited-edition pamphlet, Collecting Mystery Fiction #9, Rex Stout's Nero Wolfe Part I, Otto Penzler describes the first edition of The Golden Spiders: "Decorative gray boards, gray cloth spine with yellow lettering. Issued in a black, white and yellow dust wrapper."

In April 2006, Firsts: The Book Collector's Magazine estimated that the first edition of The Golden Spiders had a value of between $200 and $350. The estimate is for a copy in very good to fine condition in a like dustjacket.
The "concept-driven" dustjacket designed by Bill English was cited by graphic design scholar Steven Heller for its spare use of color, sans-serif typography and use of the entire front and back cover area.

- 1953, Toronto: Macmillan, 1953, hardcover
- 1954, New York: Viking (Mystery Guild), January 1954, hardcover
  The far less valuable Viking book club edition may be distinguished from the first edition in three ways:
  - The dust jacket has "Book Club Edition" printed on the inside front flap, and the price is absent (first editions may be price clipped if they were given as gifts).
  - Book club editions are sometimes thinner and always taller (usually a quarter of an inch) than first editions.
  - Book club editions are bound in cardboard, and first editions are bound in cloth (or have at least a cloth spine).
- 1954, London: Collins Crime Club, May 10, 1954, hardcover
- 1955, New York: Bantam, November 1955, paperback
- 1964, London: Fontana #964, 1964, paperback. Second printing, February 1970; third printing, July 1978; fourth printing, September 1981 (#6469)
- 1995, New York: Bantam Crimeline ISBN 0-553-27780-4 June 1, 1995, paperback, Rex Stout Library edition with introduction by Linda Barnes
- 1995, Auburn, California: Audio Partners ISBN 1-57270-038-6, audio cassette (unabridged, read by Michael Prichard)
- 2008, New York: Bantam Dell Publishing Group (with Some Buried Caesar) ISBN 0-553-38567-4 September 30, 2008, trade paperback
- 2010, New York: Bantam Crimeline ISBN 978-0-307-75597-1 June 2, 2010, e-book
