= This Won't Kill You =

- Short story by Rex Stout
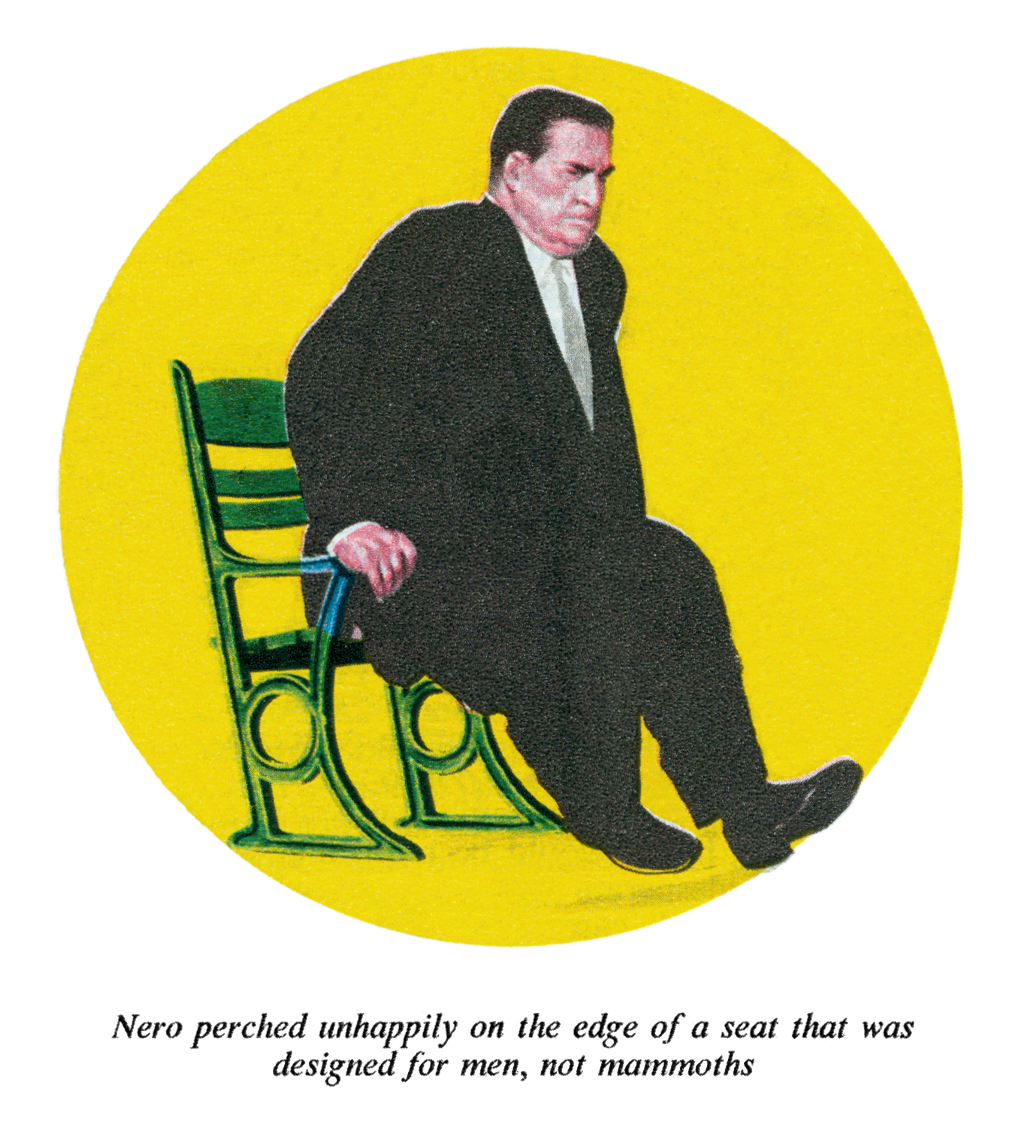
- Illustrated by Thornton Utz
- Original title: This Will Kill You
- Country: United States
- Language: English
- Genre: Detective fiction

Publication
- Published in: The American Magazine
- Publication type: Periodical
- Publication date: September 1952
- Series: Nero Wolfe

"This Won't Kill You" is a Nero Wolfe mystery novella by Rex Stout, first published as "This Will Kill You" in the September 1952 issue of The American Magazine. It first appeared in book form in the short-story collection Three Men Out, published by the Viking Press in 1954.

The character of Beaky Durkin is not presented as being related in any way to Fred Durkin, a free-lance detective often hired by Wolfe to assist with cases.

== Plot ==
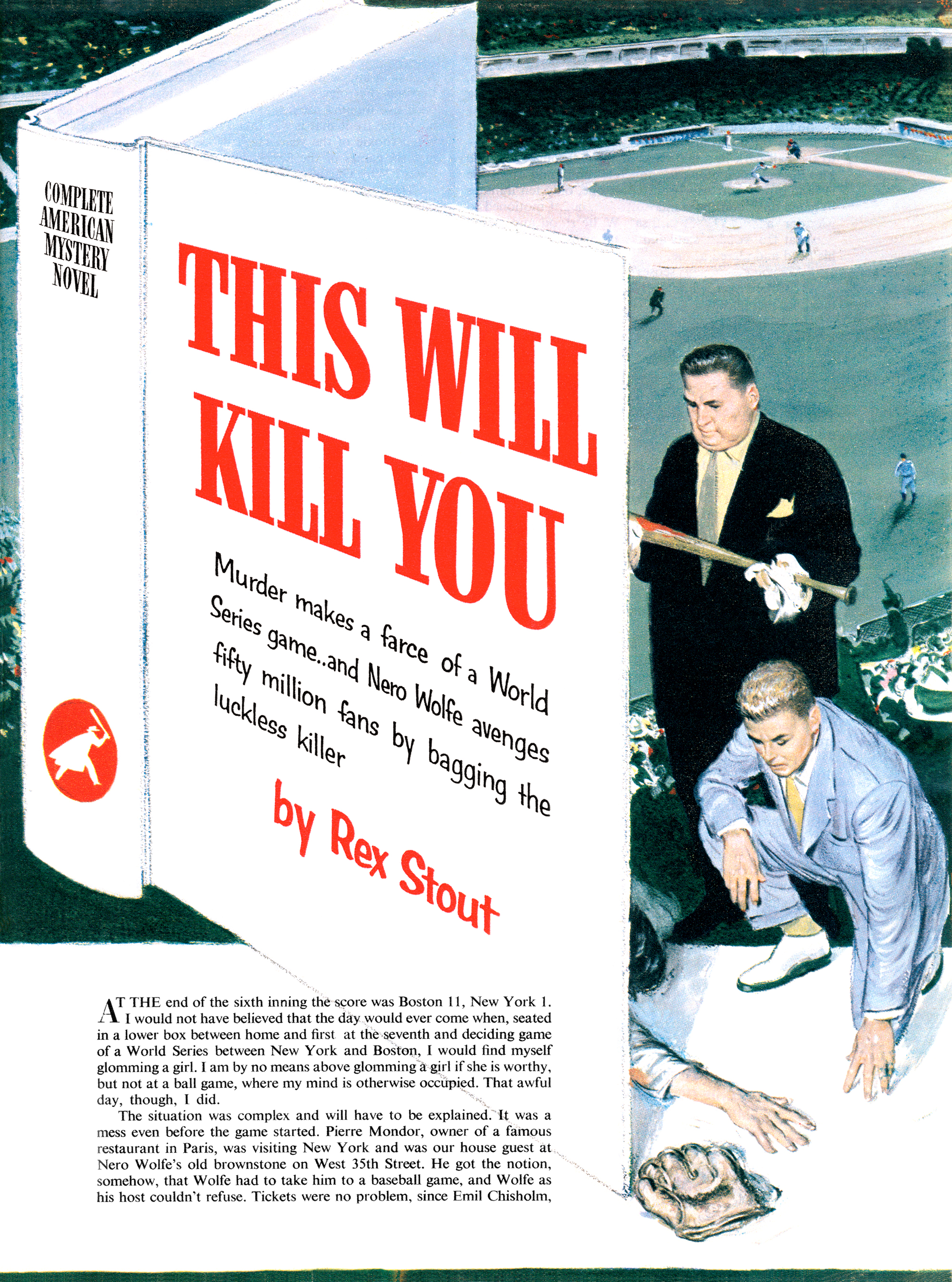
Illustrated by Thornton Utz, "This Won't Kill You" first appeared as "This Will Kill You" in The American Magazine (September 1952)

Wolfe and Archie honor a house guest's request to see a baseball game by taking him to the final game of the World Series at the Polo Grounds. The tickets come courtesy of Emil Chisholm, part-owner of the New York Giants, but Wolfe is in no mood to enjoy the game or the surroundings. The Giants fall far behind the Boston Red Sox due to inept fielding on the part of several players, and Archie notices that Nick Ferrone, a talented rookie, is not part of the day's lineup. He and Wolfe are summoned to the Giants' clubhouse by Chisholm, where they meet manager Art Kinney, team doctor Horton Soffer, and talent scout Beaky Durkin. Soffer has discovered that four of the Giants players have been drugged, by drinking beverages laced with a sedative before the game. Suspicion immediately falls on the absent Ferrone, and Archie finds him dead in another room of the clubhouse, his skull fractured with a baseball bat.

The Giants lose the game and the Series, and the police arrive to question everyone on the team at length. They begin to focus on catcher Bill Moyse, who had previously confronted Ferrone over his interest in Moyse's wife Lila. As the questioning comes to an end, Wolfe asks that the four players who were drugged remain behind, along with Kinney, Soffer, Durkin, and Chisholm, and comments that one fact has come to light and drawn his attention. Realizing that he had previously seen Lila seated in the stands and looking pleased at the Giants' poor play, Archie leaves the stadium and finds her and a friend sitting in her parked car a few blocks away. He claims that her behavior may lead the police to think that Moyse was paid to drug the drinks and fix the game, but learns from her friend that she was angry at Moyse being left on the bench throughout the entire Series and had taken pleasure in their loss.

Lila insists that Moyse had nothing to do with the drugging or the murder, but admits that the two of them had been approached by someone who wanted Moyse to fix the game: her uncle, Dan Gale. She drives Archie to Gale's drugstore in an attempt to persuade Gale to tell the police and clear Moyse's name. Instead, Gale threatens to disfigure her with sulfuric acid; Archie recognizes that he is trying to buy time for his associates to arrive and deal with their intrusion. Gale, a compulsive gambler, lost ownership of the drugstore but had been offered a chance to reclaim it by fixing the Series on behalf of organized crime.

Archie and Lila subdue Gale, spilling the acid but not injuring him or themselves, and Archie calls the police to come pick him up and look for his accomplices. Upon Archie's return to the stadium, Wolfe confronts the eight men who have remained in the clubhouse and notes that the assumption that Ferrone drugged the drinks is implausible. Brought into the Giants' organization by Durkin, Ferrone had performed so well that his next year's salary would be doubled; in addition, he would receive a large bonus if the team won the Series. Instead, Wolfe conjectures that Ferrone caught someone else drugging the drinks and was killed to keep him quiet.

The fact that drew his attention is that Durkin had been sitting in the stands from the starting lineup announcement until the time he was called into the clubhouse. Wolfe considers it highly unlikely that a scout who had brought such a promising young player onto the team would not become angry over learning that he was not going to play in a pivotal championship game. Wolfe asserts that Durkin acted as he did because he had killed Ferrone, but he has no proof until Kinney and the players intimidate Durkin into admitting his guilt. He had accepted a bribe to fix the game as a way to pay off his gambling debts; when Ferrone confronted him over a bet he had placed against the Giants, Durkin panicked and killed him. The money is found hidden in a radio, and one of the players knocks Durkin unconscious when he tries to flee.

Just before Archie can call the police to inform them of Durkin's capture, they call the clubhouse with news that Gale has confessed to paying him off. Wolfe and Archie find themselves at odds with each other over whether they or the police can take credit for solving the murder.

== Cast of characters ==
The American Magazine listed and described the characters.

- Nero Wolfe — Connoisseur of Crime
- Archie Goodwin — His assistant
- Emil Chisholm — Part owner of N. Y. team
- Art Kinney — Manager of the team
- Nick Ferrone — Missing second baseman
- Con Prentiss — Shortstop
- Lew Baker — Catcher
- Nat Neill — Center fielder
- Joe Eston — Third baseman
- Beaky Durkin — Scout
- Bill Moyse — Second-string catcher
- Lila — Bill's show-girl wife
- Dan Gale — Lila's uncle
- Inspector Hennessy — Of Bronx Homicide

== Publication history ==
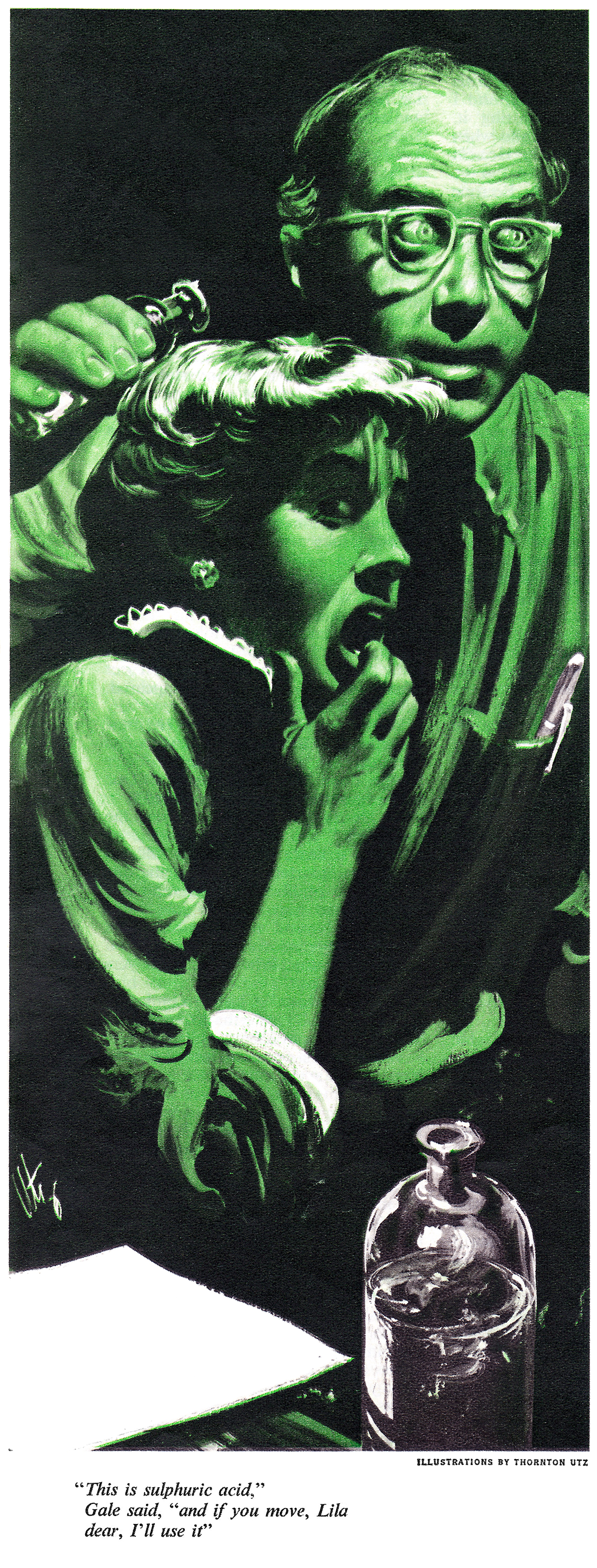
Illustration by Thornton Utz (1914–1999) for The American Magazine: Dan Gale threatening to pour acid over Lila Moyse's head.

=== "This Won't Kill You" ===
- 1952, The American Magazine, September 1952 (as "This Will Kill You")
- 1953, Ellery Queen's Mystery Magazine, October 1953 (as "The World Series Murder")
- 1962, Ellery Queen's Anthology, 1962 (as "The World Series Murder")

=== Three Men Out ===
- 1954, New York: The Viking Press, March 26, 1954, hardcover

Contents include "Invitation to Murder", "The Zero Clue" and "This Won't Kill You".
In his limited-edition pamphlet, Collecting Mystery Fiction #9, Rex Stout's Nero Wolfe Part I, Otto Penzler describes the first edition of Three Men Out: "Red boards, front cover blank. Issued in a red, black and white dust wrapper. … The binding of this title was a textured cardboard designed to resemble cloth; the book club edition has a smoother texture."
In April 2006, Firsts: The Book Collector's Magazine estimated that the first edition of Three Men Out had a value of between $200 and $350. The estimate is for a copy in very good to fine condition in a like dustjacket.

- 1954, New York: Viking (Mystery Guild), June 1954, hardcover

The far less valuable Viking book club edition may be distinguished from the first edition in three ways:

- The dust jacket has "Book Club Edition" printed on the inside front flap, and the price is absent (first editions may be price clipped if they were given as gifts).
- Book club editions are sometimes thinner and always taller (usually a quarter of an inch) than first editions.
- Book club editions are bound in cardboard, and first editions are bound in cloth (or have at least a cloth spine).

- 1955, London: Collins Crime Club, January 17, 1955, hardcover
- 1955, Toronto: Macmillan, 1955, hardcover
- 1955, New York: Bantam #1388, November 1955, paperback
- 1991, New York: Bantam Crimeline ISBN 0-553-24547-3 June 1, 1991, paperback
- 1994, New York: Bantam Crimeline ISBN 0-553-24547-3 May 1994, paperback, Rex Stout Library edition with introduction by Linda Ellerbee
- 1997, Newport Beach, California: Books on Tape, Inc. ISBN 0-7366-3749-4 July 21, 1997, audio cassette (unabridged, read by Michael Prichard)
- 2011, New York: Bantam Crimeline ISBN 978-0-307-76816-2 August 17, 2011, e-book
