= Cat of Many Tails =

1949 novel by Ellery Queen

- First US edition
- Author: Ellery Queen
- Language: English
- Series: Ellery Queen mysteries
- Genre: Mystery novel
- Publisher: Little, Brown (US); Gollancz (UK)
- Publication date: 1949
- Publication place: United States
- Media type: Print (hardcover and paperback)
- Preceded by: Ten Days' Wonder
- Followed by: Double, Double

Cat of Many Tails is a novel that was published in 1949 by Ellery Queen. It is a mystery novel set in New York City, United States.

== Plot summary ==
A strangler is killing Manhattanites, seemingly at random. The only common thread is the unusual silk cords that are used for the killings; blue for men and pink for women. Other than that, the victims come from all social classes and backgrounds, ethnicities, races, neighbourhoods, etc. The city is in a panic. Ellery Queen forms together a small group of people related to some of the victims, and some consultants, and works to determine the killer's reason for selecting these particular victims. When he finally realizes the thread that connects the victims, the murderer is revealed and peace returns to the city.

== Literary significance and criticism ==
This novel is an early and unusual example of what has become known as a serial killer novel, before the term "serial killer" was coined. The novel uses the phrase "multiple murderer". Considerable time is spent describing the reaction of the city at large to the events of the novel, and the novel employs narrative techniques unusual for Ellery Queen, such as extensive quoting of (imaginary) newspaper reports and an afterword that is "A Note on Names".

EQ seems to have first used the Q.B.I. approach – brief, synopsized tales about realistic New York City residents – in the opening chapters of his Cat of Many Tails. They stress realistic accounts of the lives of all classes of New Yorkers, people who are "typical" of some segment of life in the city, and little eccentricity. ... There are so many brief vignettes in the opening chapters ... that the book can seem more like a story sequence than a novel. ... The book becomes ... much less like a true detective story.

"A departure for EQ: more of a manhunt than a mystery, although with a neat twist. [And] there's that extraordinary sequence with Ellery and the psychiatrist."

The novel was made into a 1971 TV pilot film titled Ellery Queen: Don't Look Behind You.
