= Adventure in the Bronx =

1941 film

- Directed by: Joseph Krumgold
- Written by: Joseph Krumgold
- Starring: Michael J. O'Donnell
- Narrated by: John Kieran
- Production company: Film Associates for the New York Zoological Society
- Distributed by: Warner Bros.
- Release date: 1941
- Running time: 12 minutes
- Country: United States
- Language: English

Adventure in the Bronx is a 1941 American short documentary film directed by Joseph Krumgold and produced for the New York Zoological Society. It tells the story of a boy exploring a zoo. It was nominated for an Academy Award for Best Documentary Short. The film was later reissued by Warner Bros. under the name Sweeney Steps Out in the Hollywood Novelties series. Joseph Krumgold later wrote the book Sweeney's Adventure based on the film.
