= Double, Double (Ellery Queen novel) =

Novel by Ellery Queen

Double, Double (also published as The Case of the Seven Murders)
- First US edition
- Author: Ellery Queen
- Language: English
- Series: Ellery Queen mysteries
- Genre: Mystery novel
- Publisher: Little, Brown (US); Gollancz (UK)
- Publication date: 1950
- Publication place: United States
- Media type: Print (hardcover and paperback)
- Preceded by: Cat of Many Tails
- Followed by: The Origin of Evil

Double, Double (also published as The Case of the Seven Murders) is a novel that was published in 1949 by Ellery Queen. It is a mystery novel set in the imaginary New England town of Wrightsville, US.

== Plot summary ==
Ellery Queen investigates a series of murders that seem to be related by an old rhyme: "Rich man, poor man, beggar man, thief, ...."

== Literary significance and criticism ==
"The last full-fledged Wrightsville novel is as usual strong on characterizations. But some of the deductions made from the clues seem more speculative than logical."
