= The Descendants of Cain =

1997 novel by Hwang Sun-won

- First edition cover
- Author: Hwang Sun-won (황순원)
- Original title: 카인의 후예
- Publication date: 1954

The Descendants of Cain (Korean: 카인의 후예) is a 1954 novel by South Korean writer Hwang Sun-won (황순원).

It was instantly popular and has continued to be a steady seller ever since. It was selected by LTI Korea for translation into English and French.

== Plot ==
Set in 1946, the novel's central theme is the forced collectivization of agricultural land in North Korea, a national crisis that altered the path of the history of Korea. The main character Pak Hun goes through a romantic experience with a married daughter of his tenent farmer, which greatly changes his worldview and opinions on the Soviet occupation of Korea.

== Publication details ==
- Sun-won, Hwang. (1997). The Descendants of Cain. Trans. Suh Ji-Moon and Julie Pickering. Chicago: East Gate Book. ISBN 0-7656-0137-0.

== Film ==
The novel was adapted into a 1968 movie directed by Yu Hyun-mok.
