= Joseph Krumgold =

American writer

- Born: Joseph Quincy Krumgold; April 9, 1908; Jersey City, New Jersey, U.S.
- Died: July 10, 1980 (aged 72); Hope Township, New Jersey, U.S.
- Education: New York University
- Occupation: Writer

Joseph Quincy Krumgold (April 9, 1908 – July 10, 1980) was an American writer of books and screenplays. He was the first person to win two annual Newbery Medals for the most distinguished new American children's book. (Note: As of 2020, five other writers have won two Newbery Medals: in chronological order, Elizabeth George Speare, Katherine Paterson, Lois Lowry, E. L. Konigsburg, and Kate DiCamillo.)

== Life ==
Krumgold was born in Jersey City, New Jersey to an American Jewish family, and was immersed in the world of movies from a young age: his father, Henry, operated movie theatres.

He graduated from New York University, and worked for MGM as a scriptwriter. He later became a maker of documentaries. One production, Adventure in the Bronx, was nominated for the first Academy Award for Best Documentary (Short Subject).

He married Helen Litwin in 1947; they had one son, Adam, and lived in Greenwich Village, and Hope Township, New Jersey.

He was hired by the United States Department of State to make a film about Hispanic workers in rural America. The film was created in 1953, and shares a title with Krumgold's first Newbery Award-winning novel, ...And Now Miguel.

Six years later, Krumgold won the Newbery Medal again for Onion John, a story about an eccentric immigrant in small-town New Jersey. It was named to the Lewis Carroll Shelf Award list in 1960.

Krumgold traveled extensively throughout the world, living in several places including California, Paris, and Rome. From 1947 to 1951, he lived and worked in Israel making movies that marked the founding of modern-day Israel.

He died on July 10, 1980, at the age of 72 at his home in Hope Township.

== Other works ==
Although Krumgold is probably remembered most for the two Newbery winners, he also wrote and directed other novels and movie scripts.

- The Autobiography of a Jeep, a film produced in 1943 for the United States Office of War Information
- Dream No More, a 1953 movie
- Henry 3, a children's novel published in 1967
- The Most Terrible Turk: A Story of Turkey, a children's novel published in 1969
- Out of Evil, a 1950 movie.
- Seven Miles from Alcatraz, a 1942 movie
- Sweeney's Adventure, a children's novel published in 1942
- Thanks to Murder, an adult novel published in 1935 by the Vanguard Press
