= Ahmed Sefrioui =

Moroccan writer

- Born: January 1, 1915; Fez, Morocco
- Died: February 25, 2004 (aged 89); Rabat, Morocco
- Occupations: novelist, writer
- Writing career
- Language: French
- Notable works: Le chapelet d'ambre La Boîte à merveilles La maison de servitude Le jardin des sortilèges ou le parfum des légendes

Ahmed Sefrioui (Arabic: أحمد صفروي) (January 1, 1915 - February 25, 2004) was a Moroccan novelist and pioneer of Moroccan literature in the French language.

== Biography ==
He was born in Fes in 1915 of Berber parents. After 1938 he worked at the government departments of culture, education and tourism in Rabat. He died in 2004.

== Books ==
- Le chapelet d'ambre (Le Seuil, 1949) : His first novel centered on Fez (for this novel he receives "le grand prix littéraire du Maroc")
- La Boîte à merveilles (Le Seuil, 1954) : the city of Fez, as seen through the eyes of the little Mohammed. This novel about traditions and life in the city was a milestone for Moroccan literature.
- La maison de servitude (SNED, Algérie, 1973)
- Le jardin des sortilèges ou le parfum des légendes (L'Harmattan, 1989).
