= The Glass Village =

1954 novel by Ellery Queen

- First US edition
- Author: Ellery Queen
- Language: English
- Series: mysteries
- Genre: Mystery novel / Whodunnit
- Publisher: Little (US); Gollancz (UK)
- Publication date: August 16, 1954
- Publication place: United States
- Media type: Print (hardcover and paperback)
- Preceded by: The Scarlet Letters
- Followed by: Inspector Queen's Own Case

The Glass Village is a novel that was published in 1954 by Ellery Queen. It is a mystery novel set in the imaginary New England town of Shinn Corners, United States.

== Plot summary ==
Aunt Fanny Adams, famed artist, is the most notable citizen of the tiny New England town of Shinn Corners. A noted proponent of the naturalist school ("I paint what I see") who only began painting at age eighty, her income props up the local church, school, and almost everything else in town. When she is found murdered, suspicion immediately falls on a passing tramp named Josef Kowalczyk, and a planned lynching is nearly successful. It takes the combined efforts of the town's second-most-notable citizen, Judge Shinn, and his house guest, Major Johnny Shinn, to insist upon a trial by jury. Empaneling a jury takes every eligible citizen in the village, counsel and witnesses alike, and so the trial would never withstand legal scrutiny. But Judge Shinn and Major Shinn's investigation reveals a trail of circumstantial evidence that leads to another potential killer before the mock trial's conclusion.

== Literary significance & criticism ==
This is the first novel by the authors who collaborated as "Ellery Queen" that does not feature the detective character Ellery Queen nor even mention his name, but not the last. There are many similarities between the character of Aunt Fanny Adams and the real-life naturalist painter Grandma Moses.
