= Roma Tearne =

Sri Lankan novelist settled in England

Roma Tearne (née Chrysostom; born 1954) is a Sri Lankan-born artist and writer living and working in England. Her debut novel, Mosquito, was shortlisted for the 2007 Costa Book Awards first Novel prize (formerly the Whitbread Prize).

== Early life and education ==
Tearne moved to South London in 1964 with her Sinhalese mother and Tamil father at the age of ten.

From 2000-2001, Tearne attended the Ruskin School of Drawing and Fine Art in Oxford, where she graduated with a Master of Arts degree.

== Career ==
She was Leverhulme Artist in Residence at the Ashmolean Museum, Oxford in 2002–2003, then Artist in Residence at Modern Art Oxford in 2004. In October 2005 she started a three-year post-doctoral AHRC fellowship at Oxford Brookes University.

== Art and film ==
Tearne has exhibited at the Royal Academy of Arts, London. In a 1998 review of her work in Modern Painter, J.B. Bullen described Tearne's work as, "light is simultaneously everywhere and nowhere in these powerful paintings."

Tearne directed and shot five short films, including, Letter from Urbino, which was screened at the National Gallery, London, in 2012 as part of the launch of her novel The Road to Urbino.

== Writing ==
Tearne's first novel, Mosquito, published by HarperCollins in 2007, was shortlisted for the Costa Prize and nominated for the Los Angeles Times Book Prize. Her second novel, Bone China, was published in spring 2008. Her third novel, Brixton Beach, was published in 2009. Her fourth novel, The Swimmer (May 2010) was long-listed for the Orange Prize, while a film based on the narrative was made by Tearne and shown at the Venice Biennale in 2011. Her fifth novel, The Road to Urbino (2012) was long-listed for the Asian Man Booker, while another film by Tearne, based on the novel, was shown at the National Gallery, London, in June of that year. Tearne's most recent novels, The Last Pier (2015) and The White City (2017), were published by Aardrark Bureau.

== Publications ==
=== Novels ===
- 2017 The White City. Aardvark Bureau ISBN 9781910709429
- 2015 The Last Pier. Aardvark Bureau ISBN 9781910709306
- 2012 The Road To Urbino, Little Brown ISBN 9781408703922
- 2010 The Swimmer, HarperCollins ISBN 9780007301591, long-listed for Orange Prize 2011
- 2009 Brixton Beach, HarperCollins ISBN 9780007301560
  - French translation of Brixton Beach launched at St. Malo Festival (2011), shortlisted for a French readers' prize
- 2008 Bone China, HarperCollins ISBN 0007240732
- 2007 Mosquito, HarperCollins ISBN 0007233655, shortlisted for Costa First Novel Award and nominated for Los Angeles Times Book Prize

=== Articles ===
- 2015 "Ariadne's Thread: In memory of W.G. Sebald by Philippa Comber, book review: How Sebald remains a great inspiration for writer, Roma Tearne," The Independent
- 2012 "The Essay: In Search of the Art of Enchantment", The Independent
- 2010 "Sri Lanka's Writers Must Remember and Speak Out", The Independent
- 2008 "October 8, 1950...", The Guardian
- 2007 "In search of the Unseen Venice", The Times
- 2007 (March) Chasing Venus, for Museum of the History of Science, Oxford
- 2004 Field Study – 2, (London College of Communication) in conjunction with Tate Modern
- 2004 "My Shadow Collection", Nel Corpo delle Città (Gangemaini, Rome), pp. 19–43
- 2003 "Happenings in a Museum" (Ashmole Books) 23 pp.
- 2002 "The House of Small Things" (Angel Row, Nottingham) 10 pp.
- 2002 "House of Small Things", Source (Winter), pp. 26–33

=== Films ===
- 2012 (June) Letter From Urbino (film) for The National Gallery, London
- 2011 (June) Venice Biennale Film, The Swimmer, at the Armenian Pavilion, in association with Oxford Brookes University
- 2008 (November) Watermuseum, film for Nottingham Castle Museum

== Selected exhibitions ==
- 2022 Royal Academy of Arts, Summer Exhibition
- 2019 Royal Academy of Arts, Summer Exhibition
- 2009 198 Gallery, one person show
- 2008 "Watermuseum", Nottingham Castle Museum, based on work during AHRC fellowship at Oxford Brookes University
- 2007 (August) Flashline: Royal Museum of Scotland, Edinburgh, as part of the Edinburgh Art Festival
- 2007 (March) "Crossing the Water": Modern Art, Oxford
- 2007 Blindfolding of the Sheldonian Emperor Statues
- 2006 Every Object Tells a Story. The South Asian gallery, V & A
- 2005 (February) Artist in Residence, Modern Art, Oxford
- 2004 Museo Laboratorio di Arte Contemporaneo, "La Sapienza", Rome. Blindfolding of statues around the city, including Giordano Bruno
- 2004 Installation at Modern Art, Oxford
- 2003 Light installations St Mary's University Church, Oxford
- 2002 Ruskin MA degree show: London: Cubit gallery
- 2002 Bracknell Manor House: "Traces". New work as part of prize-winning entry for "Open Shutter"
- 2002 "The House of Small Things": Southern Arts and London Arts Board touring exhibition: Angel Row, Nottingham; X-Change Gallery, Oxford; 198 Gallery, London, Bracknell Gallery, Berkshire.
- 2002 Fotonetsouth: Bracknell Gallery Photographic show: First Prize
- 2001 "Sounding the Heart", one-person show, Milton Keynes General Hospital, National Health Service Trust
- 1997 Bankside Gallery, London, Royal Watercolour Society
- 1997 Sphinx Gallery, St James's, London
- 1997 Royal Academy of Arts, London
- 1997 Cadogan Gallery, London
- 1992 Ikon Gallery, Birmingham, South Asian Arts Festival
- 1991 Bankside Gallery, London. Mixed show
- 1991 Royal Society of Painters and Etchers, London
- 1990 Walker Art Gallery, Liverpool/Oxford Gallery. Mixed show
- 1990 Royal Society of Painters and Etchers, London
- 1991 Royal Academy of Arts, London
- 1990 Royal Academy of Arts, London
- 1989 Royal Academy of Arts, London

== Public events ==
- 2013 BBC Radio Open Book
- 2013 BBC Radio Woman's Hour
- 2012 BBC Radio 3 The Essay
- 2012 BBC Radio Front Row
- 2009 BBC Radio Woman's Hour
- 2008 (June) Art and Neuroscience. A series of talks at Oxford University
