= ...And Now Miguel =

1953 children's novel by Joseph Krumgold

- Author: Joseph Krumgold
- Illustrator: Jean Charlot
- Language: English
- Genre: Children's novel
- Published: 1953
- Publisher: Thomas Y. Crowell Company
- Publication place: United States
- Media type: Hardcover; paperback
- Pages: 245 pp
- Awards: Newbery Medal 1954

...And Now Miguel is a novel by Joseph Krumgold that won the Newbery Medal for excellence in American children's literature in 1954. It deals with the life of Miguel Chavez, a 12-year-old Hispanic-American shepherd from New Mexico. The novel, inspired by a documentary Krumgold had created the year before, was later adapted into a feature film by James B. Clark.

== 1953 documentary ==
The story originated as a 1953 documentary motion picture for the United States Department of State directed by Krumgold, documenting Miguel Chavez and Pedro Chavez.

For several months during the filming, Krumgold and his wife stayed with the Chavez family in their home in Los Cordovas, New Mexico.

== 1954 novel ==
- Krumgold, Joseph (1953). ...And Now Miguel. Illustrated by Jean Charlot. New York, New York: Thomas Y. Crowell Company.

The book was illustrated by artist Jean Charlot. The New York Herald Tribune reviewer gave credit to Charlot: "Fully half of our pleasure in the book lay in the superb Charlot drawings."

== 1966 feature film ==
In 1966, a narrative feature film adaptation was directed by James B. Clark and starred Pat Cardi as Miguel, with Michael Ansara, Guy Stockwell, Clu Gulager, Joe De Santis, Pilar Del Rey, Buck Taylor.

VideoHound's Golden Movie Retriever described the film as a "Plodding tale of a young boy who wants to take over as head shepherd of his family's flock".; while Richard Oulahan writing for Life in 1966 called it an "appealing, non-hokey nature gem".

== Musical ==
Jim Hughes and Will Graveman adapted ...And Now Miguel as a musical, produced in 2001 in Denver by El Centro Su Teatro and the Arvada Center, and directed by Tony Garcia.

== Plot summary ==
Miguel Chavez has dreamed of visiting the Sangre de Cristo Mountains since he was very little. This summer, he is going to work hard and pray until his father and grandfather realize that he is ready to take the trip with the rest of the older men.

His prayers are granted, though ironically – when his older brother is drafted his father needs an extra body and grudgingly allows Miguel to accompany them. Miguel is miserable with the manner in which his wish has been granted, and confesses to his brother what he prayed for. His brother explains that he had been praying to leave New Mexico and see more of the world – while he is not happy about being drafted, he fatalistically accepts that it is the only way he is likely to be able to fulfill his dream. The brothers resolve to allow God to work freely for the rest of their lives, and not bother God with petty requests.

Awards
| Preceded by Secret of the Andes | Newbery Medal recipient 1954 | Succeeded by The Wheel on the School |
