= Calamity Town =

1942 novel by Ellery Queen

- First US edition
- Author: Ellery Queen
- Language: English
- Series: Ellery Queen mysteries
- Genre: Mystery
- Publisher: Little, Brown (US); Gollancz (UK)
- Publication date: 1942
- Publication place: United States
- Media type: Print (Hardcover and Paperback)
- LC Class: PS3533.U4
- Preceded by: The Dragon's Teeth
- Followed by: There Was an Old Woman

Calamity Town is a mystery novel by American writers Manfred B. Lee and Frederic Dannay, published in 1942 under the pseudonym of Ellery Queen. It is set in the fictional town of Wrightsville, a place that figures in several later Queen books.

== Plot summary ==
Ellery Queen moves into the small town of Wrightsville, somewhere in New England, in order to get some peace and quiet so that he can write a book. As a result of renting a furnished house, he becomes peripherally involved in the story of Jim Haight and Nora Wright. Nora's father is president of the Wrightsville National bank, "oldest family in town", and when the head cashier Jim Haight became engaged to his daughter Nora, he built and furnished a house for them as a wedding present. That was three years ago—the day before the wedding, Jim Haight disappeared, the wedding was called off, and the jinxed house became known as "Calamity House". Ellery rents it, just before the return of Jim Haight, and the wedding is soon on again. Ellery finds some evidence that Jim is planning to poison Nora and, after the wedding, she does display some symptoms of arsenic poisoning. But it is Jim's sister Rosemary who dies after drinking a poisoned cocktail. Jim is tried for the murder and it is only after some startling and tragic events that Ellery reveals the identity of the murderer.

== Literary significance and criticism ==
Inspector Queen is not seen as a character in this novel.

After many popular mystery novels and a number of movies, the character of Ellery Queen was at this point firmly established. This is the first of what became known as the "Wrightsville" novels, the first three of which were at one time published in an omnibus edition called "The Wrightsville Murders". The Wrightsville novels all take place against the backdrop of that small imaginary New England town, feature some characters that repeat between books, and generally are more character-driven and realistic than the earliest Ellery Queen puzzle mysteries. They also contain a considerable amount of observation on the nature of small American towns.

Wrightsville was a place in the U.S. where people lived, worked and died in an atmosphere of decency and independence. A typical American town, buried in the great American heartland, up to its collective neck in good old American corn. One could freely breathe the air here, although the industry has had its influence. ... Wrightsville's milieu, people, plot, details, overall framework and everything else about it are fully organic to Queen's own vision, not yanked bodily from any prior source but shaped in part by earlier work...

Very intelligently, Dannay and Lee used this change in locale to loosen the structure of their stories. More emphasis was placed on personal relationships, and less on the details of investigation. For a time this worked well. Calamity Town (1942) and The Murderer is a Fox (1945) are two books in which the transition from one kind of crime story to another is successfully managed, although a feeling lingers that they would be even better books if Ellery did not appear in them.

One of the less irritating works of the author. Ellery leaves Manhattan for "Wrightsville", where he falls in love and gets entangled in various concerns culminating in murder; he is for a time himself a suspect. The town with its gossip and cliques is well done; the narrative is sober, and there are good courtroom scenes. Ellery is, as usual, more oracular than active."

Included in H. R. F. Keating's Crime and Mystery: the 100 Best Books.

== Adaptations ==
Dramatist Joseph Goodrich has adapted the novel for the stage. His play Calamity Town premiered at Calgary's Vertigo Theatre in 2016.
