= The Origin of Evil =

1951 novel by Ellery Queen

- First US edition
- Author: Ellery Queen
- Language: English
- Series: Ellery Queen mysteries
- Genre: Mystery
- Publisher: Little, Brown (US); Gollancz (UK)
- Publication date: 1951
- Publication place: United States
- Media type: Print (hardcover and paperback)
- Preceded by: Double, Double
- Followed by: The King is Dead

The Origin of Evil is a mystery novel by Ellery Queen (pseudonym of American writers Manfred B. Lee and Frederic Dannay), published in 1951. It is set in Los Angeles, US.

== Plot summary ==
The beautiful young Laurel Hill asks Ellery Queen to investigate a series of unusual anonymous gifts that have been received by her father, Leander Hill, half of Hill and Priam, Wholesale Jewelers. Roger Priam is Leander's partner, who uses a wheelchair. The latest gift, a dead dog with a mysterious note in a silver casket around its neck, has caused Leander to have a heart attack and die. Now Roger Priam (and his sultry wife Delia, who attracts Ellery like a carnivorous plant) has started to receive unusual anonymous gifts as well. Delia's nudist son Crowe, who is Laurel's boyfriend, and a cast of servants, are also on the scene. The mysterious gifts include some poisoned tuna fish salad, a green alligator wallet, a burned book and a bundle of worthless stocks and bonds, all accompanied by cryptic and ominous notes, and it seems as though they date back to a mysterious and possibly violent incident in the past of both Hill and Priam that gets them started in the wholesale jewelry business. Ellery Queen works out the significance of the series of gifts and the link that connects the notes and arranges a dramatic surprise that traps the criminal—although the true criminal is not known until the final moments of the book.

== Literary significance & criticism ==
After many popular mystery novels, a radio program and a number of movies, the character of Ellery Queen was at this point firmly established. This novel is the final Ellery Queen novel set in Hollywood. Earlier novels like The Four of Hearts and short stories featuring gossip columnist Paula Paris were connected with the writers' work in Hollywood for Ellery Queen movies some ten years ago and had a light comedic tone. This novel is slightly more serious and topical (Crowe the nudist is living in a tree to prepare for life after the atom bomb) but suffers from the same problem as other Queen novels, such that events and characters are unrealistic because they must meet the needs of the underlying theme that links the plot elements and forms the basis of the puzzle. "It's fair to say that the Hollywood novels made a pleasant read, but nothing more."
