= The King Is Dead (novel) =

1952 novel by Ellery Queen

- First US edition
- Author: Ellery Queen
- Language: English
- Series: Ellery Queen mysteries
- Genre: Mystery, Whodunnit
- Publisher: Little, Brown (US); Gollancz (UK)
- Publication date: 1952
- Publication place: United States
- Media type: Print (hardcover and paperback)
- Preceded by: The Origin of Evil
- Followed by: The Scarlet Letters

The King Is Dead is a mystery novel by American authors Manfred Lee and Frederic Dannay, writing as Ellery Queen. Published in 1952, it is set primarily on a fictional island, but also partly in Wrightsville, a fictional small town in the northeastern United States that figures in several Queen stories.

== Plot summary ==
Munitions maker King Bendigo is the wealthiest man alive, and what the King wants, the King gets. What he wants is the investigative powers of Ellery Queen and his father, New York homicide detective Richard Queen, in order to investigate some threatening letters. Bendigo has an enormous security apparatus in place that is capable of dealing with threats that involve sovereign governments, but these threats are more personal. Ellery and his father are transported to the Bendigo private island and soon determine that the threats originate within the King's family. The King has two brothers, his assistant Abel and drunken sot Judah, and the King's beautiful wife Karla completes the list of suspects. Judah makes little secret of the fact that it is he who has originated the threats; he announces that he will shoot King at exactly midnight on June 21. At that time, King is locked in a hermetically sealed room accompanied only by his wife; Judah is under Ellery's observation and armed only with an empty gun. At midnight, Judah lifts the empty gun and fires—and King falls back, wounded with a bullet. Karla falls under suspicion but no gun is found on her person or anywhere in the room; similarly, Judah cannot have had a bullet in his possession, having been searched repeatedly. When Ellery learns that the Bendigo family is originally from his familiar haunt of Wrightsville, he travels there for an investigation of the King's early life. Upon his return to the private island, he solves the crime and dramatic and deadly effects follow in short order.

== Literary significance and criticism ==
After many popular mystery novels, a radio program and a number of movies, the character of Ellery Queen was at this point firmly established. The character of Djuna, the Queens' houseboy seen in earlier works, is not here present but the occasional character of their cleaning woman Mrs. Fabrikant is seen in the opening chapter set in the Queens' New York City apartment. An apparently tamed pet pigeon named Arsène Lupin is also seen in the first chapter but is not seen again. This novel is the final Ellery Queen novel set in Wrightsville, but only for a chapter. While some Queen novels focus on character development, this one is in the "puzzle" category, with complex clues and efforts to explain seemingly impossible events. According to one fan resource, "There isn't too much mystery about whodunit -- it's more a question of howdidhedoit."
