= Donald Matthews (political scientist) =

Donald Rowe Matthews (September 14, 1925 – November 3, 2007) was a University of Washington political scientist. He was best known for his landmark 1960 book on the United States Senate, U.S. Senators and Their World, which was reissued six times and used as a textbook in some university courses. U.S. President Lyndon B. Johnson, who was serving as Senate Majority Leader when Matthews book was published described the book as a "landmark in the study of the Senate."

Matthews was born and raised in Cincinnati, Ohio. He initially studied at Purdue University before serving in the U.S. Navy towards the end of World War II. He later earned a master's degree and a doctorate in political science from Princeton University.

Matthews taught at several universities, including the University of North Carolina, before joining the University of Washington's political science department in 1976. Besides U.S. Senators and Their World, Matthews authored 11 other books.

Matthews died of emphysema at Swedish Medical Center in Seattle.
