= Arthur Kay (musician) =

German-American composer (1882–1969)

- Born: 16 January 1882; Grottkau/Grodków (Silesia), German Empire
- Died: 19 December 1969 (aged 87); Los Angeles, California, United States

Arthur Kay, né Kautzenbach (16 January 1882 in Grottkau/Grodków (Silesia), Germany; † 19 December, 1969 in Los Angeles (CA), United States) was a German-American conductor, composer, arranger, and cellist. Educated in Silesia and Berlin, he emigrated to the United States in 1907, where, after a few seasons as cellist of the Boston Symphony Orchestra and conductor of the Boston Pops Orchestra, he embarked on a career as conductor, composer, and arranger in operetta, silent film, and talkies, first primarily on the East Coast and from 1918 on the West Coast.

== Biography ==
=== Family and education ===
Arthur Kautzenbach came from a Catholic family in Silesia in which there had already been musicians in earlier generations. He was the first of eight children of the cartwright and musician Ferdinand Kautzenbach (1856–1942) and his wife Bertha Kautzenbach, née Großmann (1861–1923). Kautzenbach's main instrument was the cello, but he learned other instruments during his training in his father's apprentice orchestras in Grottkau, Frankenstein, and Reichenbach im Eulengebirge. His sisters learned piano, his brothers string instruments. His sister Maria Kautzenbach, married Folgmann (1884–1915), and his brothers Wilhelm Kautzenbach, later William Kautzenbach or Temas Kay (1887–1964), and Georg (George) Kautzenbach (1895–1990) also became professional musicians.

From 1900 to 1907, Arthur Kautzenbach studied cello at the Königliche akademische Hochschule für Musik in Berlin with Robert Hausmann, interrupted in 1905–1906 by one year of voluntary service (Einjährigen-Freiwilligendienst). Financial support for his studies and shortened military service came from a scholarship from the Carl Haase Foundation and from the musician and patron Martin Lesser (c. 1857–1919). During this time Kautzenbach already gave his first public concerts and probably also played in orchestras in Berlin and Hamburg.

=== Boston ===
Through a contact with conductor Karl Muck, Kautzenbach was hired as a cellist by the Boston Symphony Orchestra in 1907. There he played in the cello section for three seasons and is also said to have served as Karl Muck's assistant. In 1908 and 1909 he also took on conducting duties with the Boston Pops Orchestra, where Boston orchestra members found paid employment in the early summer.

Kautzenbach presented several compositions during this period (Pops, Skidoo Galop, Bunker Hill, Impressions), which were also performed by the Boston Pops Orchestra. Subsequently, some of his compositions were also published by G. Schirmer in New York.

=== New York and US Province ===
In 1910 Kautzenbach moved to New York City following operetta composer Victor Herbert, whose music had already impressed him during a stay in Hamburg. It initially proved difficult that, as a member of the Boston Symphony Orchestra, he had not become a member of the American Federation of Musicians, which otherwise required union membership for any work as a musician. He subsequently conducted various opera and operetta projects (e.g., The Paradise of Mahomet by Robert Planquette and The Pink Lady by Ivan Caryll) in New York and the provinces, worked as a cellist in Victor Herbert's orchestra, and then conducted his operettas, including the 1917 New York premiere of Hearts of Erin.

In 1911 he married Marian Hallett of Somerville, near Boston. He had three children with her. The family continued to live in Somerville while Kautzenbach was in New York and on tour.

=== Work in silent film in Los Angeles, Seattle and Chicago. ===
In 1918, Kautzenbach, who from then on called himself Kay, moved to Los Angeles. As a result of the anti-German sentiment surrounding the U.S. entry into World War I, the conductor's position had become vacant at Grauman's Million Dollar Theatre, run by Sid Grauman. The previous director, Rudolph G. Kopp, was fired and interned for alleged anti-Amerikan statements. Kay conducted in Grauman's Million Dollar Theatre from then on both the incidental music to the silent films and the elaborate prologues designed by Sid Grauman with music and various vaudeville numbers. The repertoire he had learned during his time in his father's apprentice orchestras played a significant role, i.e. opera and operetta melodies as well as lighter classical works by Franz Liszt or Edvard Grieg, for example. After a while, Kay also took over the direction of the Sunday morning concerts initiated by Sid Grauman, with which Kay claimed to educate the audience musically.

After a disagreement arose between Kay and Grauman over musical quality issues, Kay resigned. He went on to conduct the orchestras of the silent movie theaters Coliseum Theatre in Seattle (WA) (1920–1922) and Tivoli Theatre in Chicago (IL) (1922–1923). In 1923 he returned to Los Angeles and now took up conducting positions at Loew’s State Theatre and Grauman's Chinese Theatre.

During his time as a silent film conductor, Kay not only compiled numerous cue sheets for silent films, but also began composing his own silent film scores. The silent film compositions, as well as other works and arrangements by him, were published by Forster Music Publishers, Chicago, and McKinley Music, Chicago. The best-known sequence of music Kay put together for a silent film is that for Charlie Chaplin's film The Circus (1928), in which he used music from opera and operetta, popular classical instrumentals, topical songs, and jazz pieces, as well as many silent film compositions of the time, including his own (A Funny Story, Mysterious Stranger, Gossip, The Accuser).

Kay was repeatedly questioned by the press about his conception of silent film music. In doing so, he found that silent film music should not obviously mimic the actions of the silent film, but rather draw longer, connecting arcs of tension. He considered the classical repertoire particularly suitable in this context.

=== Activity in the sound film ===
From 1927 Kay worked in sound film, first for Vitaphone Varieties/Warner Brothers and after working for radio station KHJ from 1929 to 1931 for Fox Corporation. After that followed until about 1951 engagements with various studios: Academy Pictures Corporation, Educational, Grand National Pictures, Library Films, Mascot Pictures, Mercury Productions, Metro-Goldwyn-Mayer, Paramount, Republic Pictures, RKO, Universal Pictures and Warner Bros. Initially he took over the musical direction and partly also works as a composer and arranger mainly of music films, later for many dramas, westerns, adventure and gangster films. Among others, he participated in well-known productions such as Citizen Kane (1941) (here you can see him conducting in a scene) and Gone with the Wind. Among others, the film The Big Trail with John Wayne achieved fame during his time. In an interview in 1931, Kay stated that he wanted to write less concrete and more impressionistic film music, which probably did not apply to most of his productions.

=== Theatrical work ===
In the mid-1920s, in addition to his film work and appearances as a conductor in concerts, shows and revues, Kay returned to the theater. After initially conducting various productions of George Gershwin (Lady Be Good, Tip-Toes, Girl Crazy) at different theaters in Los Angeles, for example, which called for a more contemporary, jazz-oriented orchestra, he concentrated more and more on European and U.S. operetta, contrary to the developments of the time. The works of Victor Herbert, and beyond that of Rudolf Friml and Siegmund Romberg, formed the core of his interest. In the mid-1930s, he first participated as a conductor in the Annual Light Opera Festival, produced by Lynden E. Behymer and Merle Armitage, which was very much in line with Kay's musical preferences. Independently, in 1936 he composed the music for Raymond Cannon's Her Majesty the Prince based on Chinese melodies.

Finally, in 1938 the Los Angeles Civic Light Opera and in 1941 the San Francisco Civic Light Opera were founded with the help of private donations, continuing the efforts of the Annual Light Opera Festival in the exchange between the two cities of Los Angeles and San Francisco. Kay regularly conducted works of European and U.S. operetta here, and in time also productions by George Forrest and Robert Wright, who liked to draw on existing music, such as that of Edvard Grieg (Song of Norway, 1944) and Alexander Borodin (Kismet, 1953), in their compositions. These productions led Kay, in part, back to New York's Broadway once again.

Until 1962 Kay was regularly active as part of the Los Angeles Civic Light Opera, after which he largely withdrew into private life and was only occasionally engaged, for example for arrangements, most recently in 1966.

=== Death ===
Arthur Kay, who did not become a U.S. citizen until 1943, died on December 19, 1969, in Los Angeles, CA.

=== Note ===
The musician Arthur Kay, né Kautzenbach, is not identical with the Arthur Kay who worked as a voice actor for the Terrytoons cartoons and lent his voice to, for example, “Gandy Goose”.

== Compositions (selection) ==
A detailed catalog of works can be found in: Sophie Fetthauer Arthur Kay, vordem Kautzenbach (1882–1969). Ein Dirigent, Komponist und Arrangeur in den Musikwelten von Theater, Stummfilmkino und Hollywood-Studio, Neumünster: von Bockel Verlag, 2023.

=== Piano ===
- Dragonfly. Caprice, Chicago: Forster Music Publisher, 1925.

=== Chamber Music ===
- Three Compositions, für Violoncello und Klavier, 1. Longing, 2. Serenade, 3. Spinnliedchen (Spinning-Song), New York (NY): G. Schirmer [1911].
- Two Compositions, für Cello und Klavier, 1. Troubadour. Intermezzo, 2. Autumn Thoughts, New York (NY): G. Schirmer, 1924.

=== Vocal ===
- Enduring Troth (Andenken), Lied für mittlere Stimme und Klavier, Text: Joseph von Eichendorff, Übersetzung: Th. Baker, New York (NY): G. Schirmer, 1924.

=== Orchestra ===
- Pops. March, UA: Boston Pops Orchestra, Boston, 29 May 1908.
- Skidoo Galop, UA: Boston Pops Orchestra, Boston, 6 June 1908.
- Bunker Hill. March, mit Orgel, UA: Boston Pops Orchestra, Boston, 24 May 1909.
- Impressions. Waltz, UA: Boston Pops Orchestra, Boston, 31 May 1909.

=== Silent Film (sheet music editions for orchestra) ===
- Serenade, Gaston Borch (Arr.), New York (NY): G. Schirmer, 1914.
- Avalanche. Dramatic Allegro, Edmund Roth (Arr.) (= FMPIS), Chicago: Forster Music Publisher, 1925.
- Cabal. Dramatic Misterioso, Edmund Roth (Arr.) (= FMPIS), Chicago: Forster Music Publisher, 1925.
- Corinne. Tender Passion, Edmund Roth (Arr.) (= FSC), Chicago: Forster Music Publisher, 1925.
- Desert Caravan. Oriental No. 2, Edmund Roth (Arr.) (= FMPIS), Chicago: Forster Music Publisher, 1925.
- Dolores. Elegy, Edmund Roth (Arr.) (= FMPIS), Chicago: Forster Music Publisher, 1925.
- Gossip. Light Agitato, Edmund Roth (Arr.) (= FMPIS), Chicago: Forster Music Publisher, 1925.
- Hedjas. Orientale No. 1, Edmund Roth (Arr.) (= FMPIS), Chicago: Forster Music Publisher, 1925, UA: Seattle, Coliseum, 4. Sept. 1921.
- Hercules. Rugged, Boisterous, Edmund Roth (Arr.) [(= FMPIS), Chicago: Forster Music Publisher, 1925].
- Mysterious Stranger. Misterioso, Edmund Roth (Arr.) (= FMPIS), Chicago: Forster Music Publisher, 1925.
- Stealthy Visitors. Eccentric Misterioso, Edmund Roth (Arr.) (= FMPIS), Chicago: Forster Music Publisher, 1925.
- The Accuser. Dramatic Agitato, Edmund Roth (Arr.) (= FMPIS), Chicago: Forster Music Publisher, 1925.
- Tragedienne. Dramatic Andante, Edmund Roth (Arr.) (= FMPIS), Chicago: Forster Music Publisher, 1925.
- Villain. Sinister Atmosphere, Edmund Roth (Arr.) (= FMPIS), Chicago: Forster Music Publisher, 1925.
- A Funny Story. Intermezzo Humoresque, Edmund Roth (Arr.) (= FSC), Chicago: Forster Music Publisher, 1926.
- Chastity. Sweet Pathetic Andante, Edmund Roth (Arr.) (= FMPIS), Chicago: Forster Music Publisher, 1926.
- Protestation. Agitato, Edmund Roth (Arr.) (= FMPIS), Chicago: Forster Music Publisher, 1926.
- Señorita Lolita. Morceau Characteristique, Edmund Roth (Arr.) [(= FMPIS)], Chicago: Forster Music Publisher, 1926.
- Solace. Andante, Edmund Roth (Arr.) (= FMPIS), Chicago: Forster Music Publisher, 1926.
- Threnody. Lamentation, Edmund Roth (Arr.) (= FMPIS), Chicago: Forster Music Publisher, 1926.
- Vanishing Race. American Indian Lament, Edmund Roth (Arr.) (= FMPIS), Chicago: Forster Music Publisher, 1926.
- „Alarm“. Agitato, Edmund Roth (Arr.) (= FMPIS), Chicago, Forster Music Publisher, 1927.
- Pippin. Valse Caprice, Edmund Roth (Arr.) (= FSC), Chicago: Forster Music Publisher, 1927.

=== Silent Film (composition, compilation of musical sequences) ===
- The Jack-Knife Man, 1920.
- The Last of the Mohicans, 1920.
- The Gaucho, 1927.
- The Circus, 1928.

=== Sound film (composition, arrangement, musical direction, appearance as conductor) ===
- Visions of Spain, 1927.
- Chasing Through Europe, 1929.
- Fox Movietone Follies of 1929, 1929.
- Married in Hollywood, 1929.
- Sunny Side Up, 1929.
- Words and Music, 1929.
- South Sea Rose, 1929.
- The Exalted Flapper, 1929.
- The Wolf Song, 1929.
- Are You There?, 1930.
- City Girl, 1930.
- Common Clay, 1930.
- Fox Movietone Follies of 1930 (New Movietone Follies of 1930), 1930.
- Just Imagine, 1930.
- Oh, for a Man!, 1930.
- The Big Trail, 1930.
- The Golden Calf (Her Golden Calf), 1930.
- The Princes and the Plumber, 1930.
- Ambassador Bill, 1931.
- Fair Warning, 1931.
- Igloo, 1932.
- Apples to You, 1934.
- Flirtation, 1934.
- Little Man, What Now?, 1934.
- Nifty Nurses, 1934.
- The Human Side, 1934.
- The Live Ghost, 1934.
- There's Always Tomorrow, 1934.
- Young and Beautiful, 1934.
- Tailspin Tommy, 1934/35.
- Alias Mary Dow, 1935.
- Beautiful Dreamer, 1935.
- Chinatown Squad, 1935.
- Hail, Brother, 1935.
- Harmony Lane, 1935.
- Hitch Hike Lady, 1935.
- I’ve Been Around, 1935.
- Lady Tubbs, 1935.
- One Frightened Night, 1935.
- Outlawed Guns, 1935.
- Rustlers of Red Dog, 1935.
- Sagebrush Troubadour, 1935.
- Streamline Express, 1935.
- The Adventures of Rex and Rinty, 1935.
- The Calling of Dan Matthews, 1935.
- The Fighting Marines, 1935.
- The Singing Vagabond, 1935.
- The Throwback, 1935.
- Comin’ Round the Mountain, 1936.
- Dangerous Waters, 1936.
- Daniel Boone (dt. Banditen von Kain-Tu-kei), 1936.
- Darkest Africa, 1936.
- Flying Hostess, 1936.
- Ghost-Town Gold, 1936.
- King of the Pecos, 1936.
- Oh, Susanna!, 1936.
- Red River Valley, 1936.
- Ride, Ranger, Ride, 1936.
- Roarin’ Lead, 1936.
- Robinson Crusoe of Clipper Island, 1936.
- Sea Bandits (I Conquer the Sea!), 1936.
- Silly Billies, 1936.
- The Big Show, 1936.
- The House of a Thousand Candles, 1936.
- The Lawless Nineties, 1936.
- The Leavenworth Case, 1936.
- The Mandarin Mystery, 1936.
- The Old Corral, 1936.
- The Phantom Rider, 1936.
- The Singing Cowboy, 1936.
- The Vigilantes Are Coming, 1936.
- Undersea Kingdom, 1936.
- Winds of the Wasteland, 1936.
- Affairs of Cappy Ricks, 1937.
- California Straight Ahead!, 1937.
- Come on, Cowboys, 1937.
- Dick Tracy, 1937.
- Public Cowboy No. 1, 1937.
- Range Defenders, 1937.
- Renfrew of the Royal Mounted, 1937.
- Riders of the Whistling Skull, 1937.
- Rootin’ Tootin’ Rhythm, 1937.
- Round-Up Time in Texas, 1937.
- She's Dangerous, 1937.
- SOS Coast Guard, 1937.
- The Girl Said No, 1937.
- Wallaby Jim of the Islands, 1937.
- West Bound Limited, 1937.
- Border Wolves, 1938.
- The Gladiator, 1938.
- The Fighting Devil Dogs, 1938.
- King of the Newsboys, 1938.
- You Can't Get Away with Murder, 1939.
- Gone with the Wind, 1939.
- The Great Victor Herbert, 1939.
- Men with Steel Faces, 1940.
- Citizen Kane, 1941.
- The Fighting Devil Dogs, 1943.
- Rhapsody in Blue, 1945.
- Arctic Fury, 1951.

=== Stage (composition) ===
- Her Majesty, the Prince, Libretto: Raymond Cannon, Musik: Arthur Kay nach Motiven chinesischer Musik, UA: Los Angeles, Music Box Theater, 1936.

== Literature ==
- Anonymos: “Kay Is Far From Being a ‘Yes’ Man. Loew Orchestra Leader Has Own Way of Scoring Photoplays”, in: Los Angeles Times, 25 November 1923, p. III/46.
- Verna Arvey: “Present Day Musical Films and How They Are Made Possible,” in: Etude, January 1931, pp. 16–18, 61, 72.
- Jim Lochner: The Music of Charlie Chaplin, Jefferson (NC): McFarland, 2018, ISBN 978-0-7864-9611-2.
- Sophie Fetthauer: Arthur Kay, vordem Kautzenbach (1882–1969). Ein Dirigent, Komponist und Arrangeur in den Musikwelten von Theater, Stummfilmkino und Hollywood-Studio, Neumünster: von Bockel Verlag, 2023, ISBN 978-3-95675-038-0.
