= The Three Mesquiteers (film) =

1936 film by Ray Taylor

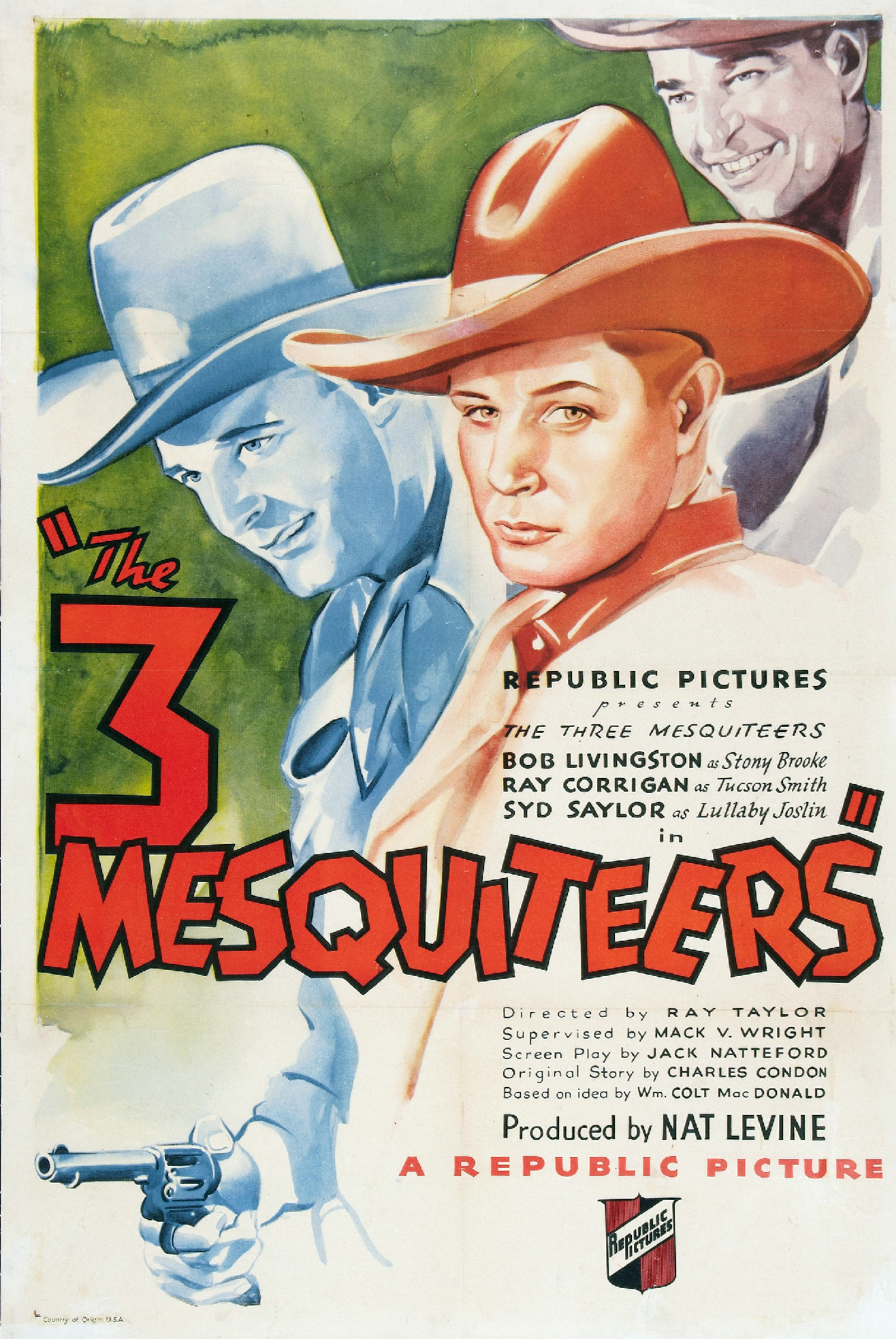
- Theatrical release poster
- Directed by: Ray Taylor
- Written by: Jack Natteford; Charles R. Condon
- Based on: Based on characters by William Colt MacDonald
- Produced by: Nat Levine
- Starring: Bob Livingston; Ray Corrigan; Syd Saylor
- Cinematography: William Nobles
- Edited by: William P. Thompson
- Music by: Harry Grey
- Production company: Republic Pictures
- Distributed by: Republic Pictures
- Release date: September 22, 1936
- Running time: 61 minutes
- Country: United States
- Language: English

The Three Mesquiteers is a 1936 American Western "Three Mesquiteers" B-movie, starring Bob Livingston (in the role later played by John Wayne), Ray "Crash" Corrigan and Syd Saylor. It is first in a 51-film series of "Three Mesquiteers" films based on characters from the novels written by William Colt MacDonald, eight of which starred John Wayne. The film was directed by Ray Taylor, and produced by Nat Levine and written by Jack Natteford.

== Plot ==
Set in the year 1919, following World War I, military veterans Lullaby Joslin and Bob Bryant are recovering from their wounds at a U.S. Veterans Hospital and decide to head out to San Juan Basin, New Mexico with some other veterans and apply for ownership of land being given away through the Homestead Acts. Lullaby and Bob and the other veterans arrive at Carrizozo, New Mexico and meet Stony Brooke and Tucson Smith, as well as Brack Canfield who advises the men to keep going west for their own good.

Bob and the other veterans exchange their vehicles for horses and covered wagons for the trek to the San Juan Basin, Lullaby continues on with his motorcycle side car. Brack Canfield tells his brother Olin that what happens next has to look like an accident. Shortly afterwards there is the sound of a blast and an rockslide occurs on the trail, the caravan of veterans are forced to hurry out of the way, and everyone survives.

Stony and Tucson ride back to investigate the landslide and discover that it was no accident, as there are remnants of a dynamite blast. Canfield's men realize that the veterans have survived and attempt to drive off the veterans' horses. Stony and Tucson begin a gunfight with them, Lullaby appears on a hill in his motorcycle side car, and waves on the people behind him, but it is a bluff. Canfield's men take Lullaby's bluff seriously and withdraw thinking that there is a gang on its way.

== Cast ==
- Robert Livingston as Stony Brooke
- Ray Corrigan as Tucson Smith
- Syd Saylor as Lullaby Joslin
- Kay Hughes as Marian Bryant
- J.P. McGowan as Brack Canfield
- Al Bridge as Olin Canfield
- Frank Yaconelli as Pete (Italian vet)
- John Merton as Bull (chief henchman)
- Gene Marvey as Bob Bryant
- Milburn Stone as John (a vet)
- Duke York as Chuck (one-armed vet)
- Nina Quartero as Rosita (waitress) (billed as Nena Quartaro)
- Allen Connor as Milt (one-legged vet)
