= Phyllis Fraser =

American socialite, writer, publisher, and actress

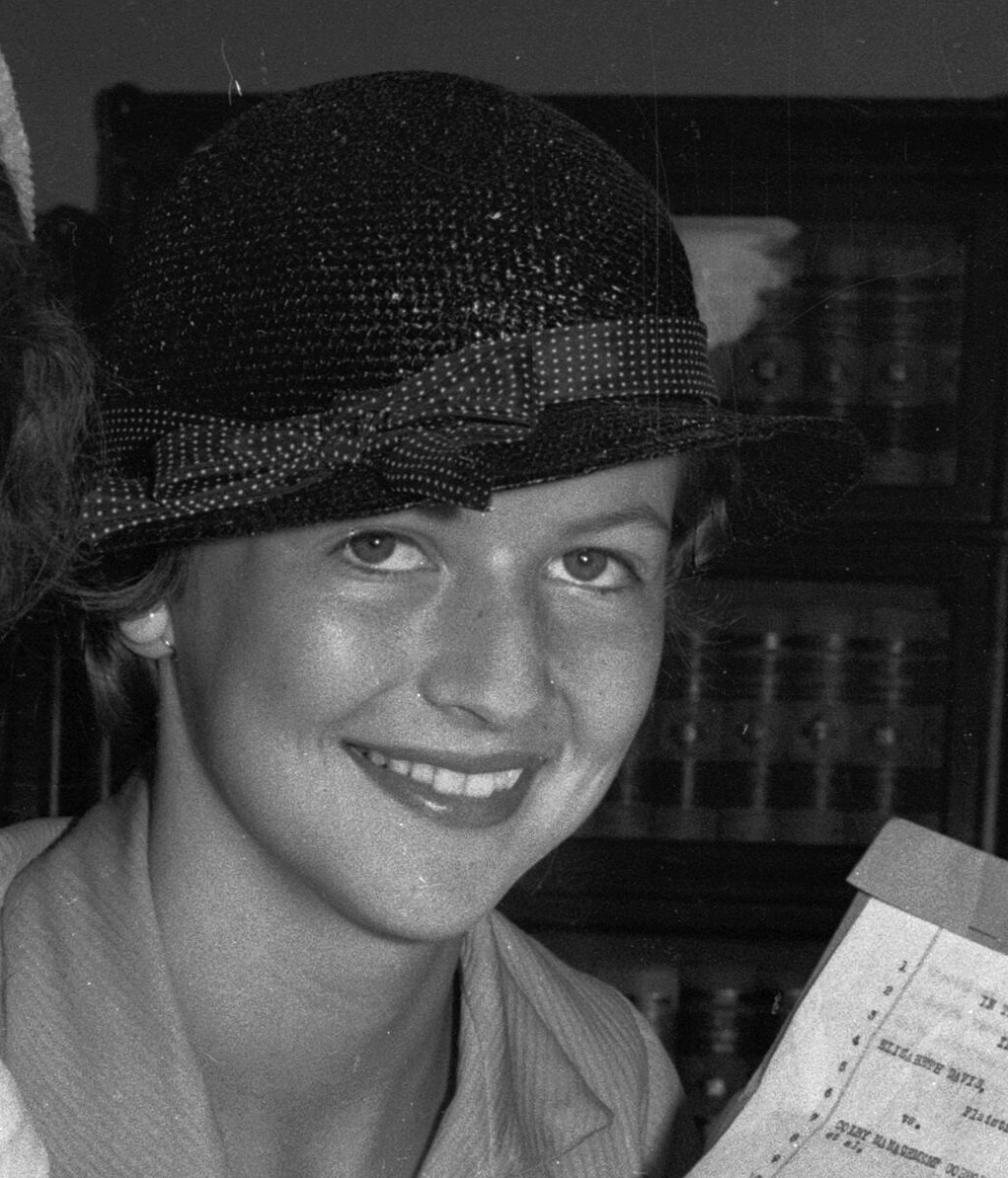
- Fraser in 1932
- Born: Helen Brown Nichols; April 13, 1916; Kansas City, Missouri, U.S.
- Died: November 24, 2006 (aged 90); New York City, U.S.
- Other name: Phyllis Cerf Wagner
- Occupations: Socialite; writer; publisher; actress
- Known for: Winds of the Wasteland
- Spouses: Bennett Cerf (m. 1940; died 1971) Robert F. Wagner Jr. (m. 1975; died 1991)
- Children: 2; including Christopher Cerf
- Relatives: Ginger Rogers (cousin); Vinton Hayworth (uncle)

Phyllis Cerf Wagner (born Helen Brown Nichols; April 13, 1916 – November 24, 2006), also known as Phyllis Fraser, was an American socialite, writer, publisher, and actress. She was a co-founder of Beginner Books.

== Early life ==
Fraser was born Helen Brown Nichols in Kansas City, Missouri. Her mother was Verda Virginia Clendenin (née Owens), daughter of Walter and Saphrona Owens (née Ball), who were of Welsh ancestry. Her two maternal aunts were Jean Owens, wife of radio actor Vinton Hayworth (uncle of Rita Hayworth), and Lela (Owens) McMath, mother of Ginger Rogers. Not long after her birth, her mother moved to Oklahoma City, where Fraser resided until age 16.

== Hollywood ==
At 16, she went to live with her aunt, Lela, and first cousin, Virginia, a dancer, in California. There, Virginia, who had become actress Ginger Rogers, thought up Helen's new (professional) name and introduced her to the Hollywood scene. Between 1932 and 1939, Phyllis Fraser appeared in several movies, most notably Winds of the Wasteland (1936) with John Wayne and Little Men (1934). In 1932, Fraser had a role, later deleted, in the RKO film Thirteen Women.

== New York ==
In 1939, she left Hollywood for New York City to pursue a career in advertising at McCann Erickson. Soon after her arrival, she was introduced by The New Yorker editor Harold Ross to publishing magnate and Random House co-founder (and future What's My Line? panelist) Bennett Cerf, whom she married on September 17, 1940. They had two sons, Christopher Cerf, an author and composer-lyricist who has contributed numerous songs to Sesame Street, and Jonathan Cerf, the author of Big Bird's Red Book and the 1980 world champion of Othello, the board game.

She wrote The ABC and Counting Book, a children's book. Along with Ted Geisel and his wife, Fraser co-founded Beginner Books, the Random House imprint for young children.

After Cerf's death on August 27, 1971, she married former New York City mayor Robert F. Wagner, Jr. on January 30, 1975. They remained married until Wagner died on February 12, 1991. She lived for the last half of the twentieth century, with each of her husbands, in a five-floor townhouse at 132 East 62nd Street. Despite an undistinguished façade, Denning & Fourcade did the décor. "It’s cozy and grand at the same time, but not elaborately fussy," said real estate agent John Glass in 2007 while the townhouse was for sale for $9.9 million.

== Death ==
Fraser died on November 24, 2006, in New York, following complications from a fall. She was 90 years old.
