= Kay Hughes =

American actress (1914–1998)

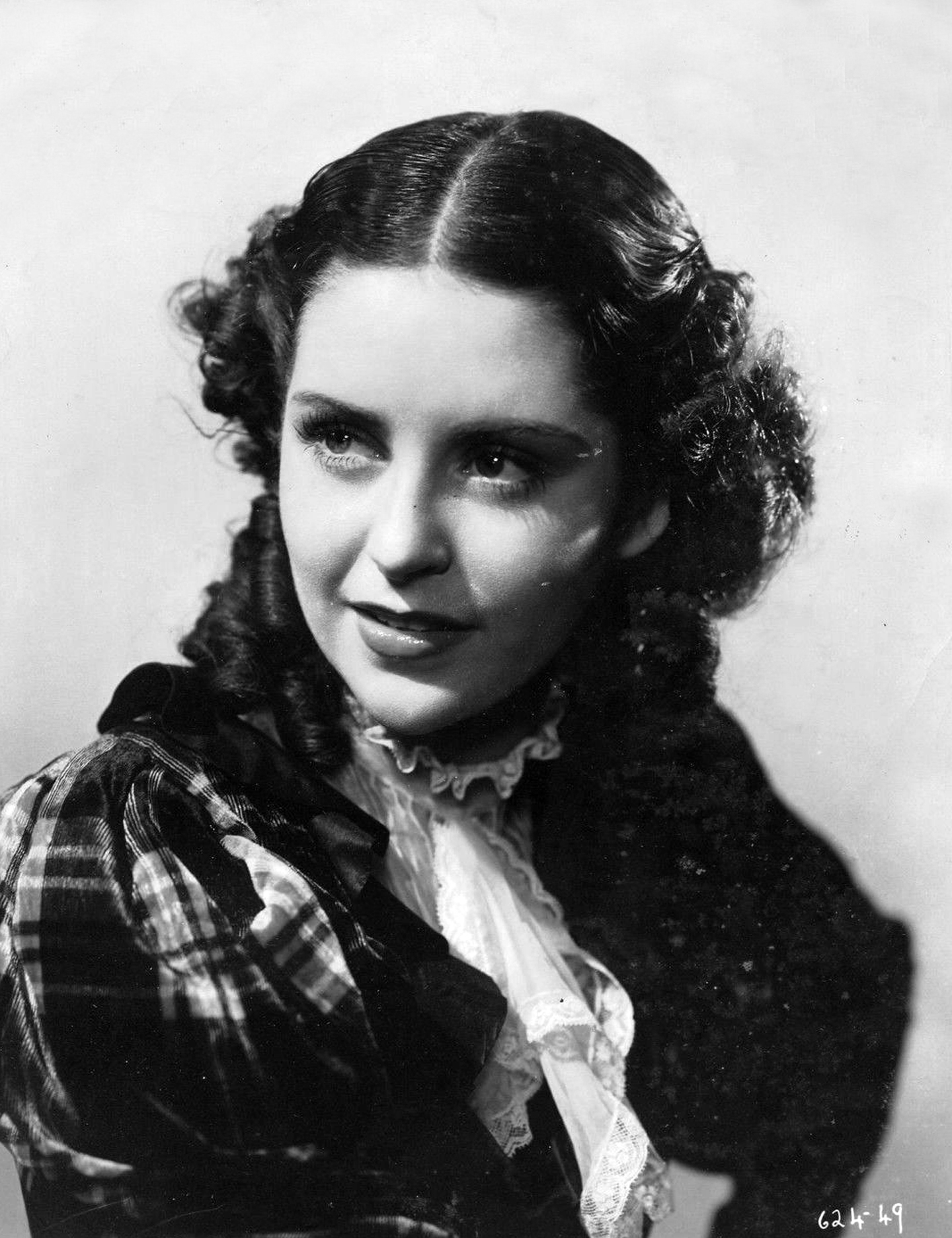
- Kay Hughes, 1936
- Born: Catherine Mary Hughes; January 16, 1914; Los Angeles, California, U.S.
- Died: April 4, 1998 (aged 84); Palm Springs, California, U.S.
- Other names: Catherine Hughes
- Occupation: Actress
- Years active: 1933–1945

Kay Hughes (born Catherine Mary Hughes; January 16, 1914 – April 4, 1998) was an American actress in the 1930s and 1940s who appeared mainly in Western films and serials.

== Biography ==
Hughes was born in Los Angeles, California. When she was a year old, her family moved back to her father's native Ohio to be closer to his mother; after she died, they moved back to California when Kay was nine years old. She originally hoped to be a dancer, but health issues requiring two operations during her early years prevented this. In 1935 she auditioned for and received a part in Broadway Melody of 1936 which involved dancing. The film featured Jack Benny and Robert Taylor. Her first speaking role was in After the Dance (1936). While shooting on location in Sonora, California, she met her future husband, who worked as a still photographer for MGM.

In 1936, Hughes was signed to a contract with Republic Pictures, where she received leading roles. Although she was only with the studio for six months, she starred in several B Westerns and two of the studio's famed serials. She starred in the first two films of the popular The Three Mesquiteers series—The Three Mesquiteers (1936) and Ghost-Town Gold (1936)—which launched an entire subgenre of Western movies. She was also the female lead in Republic's third serial, The Vigilantes Are Coming (1936) with Robert Livingston. That same year she appeared in two Gene Autry films as his leading lady, Ride Ranger Ride and The Big Show. She had been scheduled to appear in a third Autry film but was injured during a horse-riding sequence.

In 1937, Hughes starred in the first serial of the Dick Tracy series with Ralph Byrd and Smiley Burnette. The series was re-edited into a feature film, which was released in the same year. At the time, her agent was also managing Deanna Durbin at Universal Studios, and he encouraged her to change studios. That year she broke her contract with Republic after only six months and began making films at Universal Studios as Catherine Hughes, which she thought sounded more sophisticated; however, she ended up doing the same type of work, starring in another serial Radio Patrol (1937) and the film Trouble at Midnight (1938).

After a break of two years, she signed a contract with Columbia Pictures and appeared in the Western film Riders of the Badlands (1941). She was pregnant with her daughter during the 1940 filming. After taking off a few years, she made a brief comeback in 1945 appearing with Tex Ritter in Enemy of the Law under the name Ruby Martin. Her final screen appearance was in the 1945 Buster Crabbe Western Fighting Bill Carson, after which she decided to retire from films and raise her family.

Hughes was married three times. She married for the first time in the 1940s and the couple had two children. Her first child, a daughter, was born in 1941. They were divorced in 1947. Hughes married her second husband in 1947 and moved with him to St. Louis, Missouri and then later to Tulsa, Oklahoma. They remained married until his death in 1964. Hughes married her third husband in 1964 and they traveled together throughout the United States, eventually moving to Reno, Nevada. After he died, she moved to Desert Hot Springs, California, to live near her sister Lois. After undergoing heart surgery in December 1997, Hughes died on April 4, 1998, in Palm Springs, California.

== Filmography ==
- Saturday's Millions (1933) as Student (uncredited)
- Men in Black (1934, Short) as Nurse (uncredited)
- It's the Cats (1934, Short) as Club Member
- The Chases of Pimple Street (1934, Short) as Clerk (uncredited)
- His Old Flame (1935, Short)
- George White's 1935 Scandals (1935) as One of the Girls (uncredited)
- Slightly Static (1935, Short) as Telephone operator (uncredited)
- Fighting Youth (1935) as Sorority Girl (uncredited)
- Strike Me Pink (1936) as Goldwyn Girl (uncredited)
- The Robin Hood of El Dorado (1936) as Louise
- Every Saturday Night (1936) as Patty Newall
- Brides Are Like That (1936) as Mary Ann Coleridge
- Snowed Under (1936) as Miss Jones (uncredited)
- Romance in the Air (1936, Short) as Minor Role (uncredited)
- The Vigilantes Are Coming (1936) as Doris Colton
- The Three Mesquiteers (1936) as Marian Bryant
- Ride Ranger Ride (1936) as Dixie Summerall
- Ghost-Town Gold (1936) as Sabina Thornton
- The Big Show (1936) as Marion Hill
- The Mandarin Mystery (1936) as Irene Kirk
- A Man Betrayed (1936) as Marjorie Norton
- Dick Tracy (1937, Serial) as Gwen Andrews
- Radio Patrol (1937, Serial) as Molly Selkirk
- Trouble at Midnight (1938 as Catherine Benson
- Honolulu Lu (1941) as Nurse (uncredited)
- Riders of the Badlands (1941) as Celia Barton
- Enemy of the Law (1945) as Ruby Lawson
- Fighting Bill Carson (1945) as Jean Darcy (final film role)
