= The Siamese Twin Mystery =

Novel by Ellery Queen

- First US edition
- Author: Ellery Queen
- Language: English
- Series: Ellery Queen mysteries
- Genre: Mystery novel / whodunnit
- Publisher: Stokes (US); Gollancz (UK)
- Publication date: 1933
- Publication place: United States
- Media type: Print
- OCLC: 1506529
- Preceded by: The American Gun Mystery
- Followed by: The Chinese Orange Mystery

The Siamese Twin Mystery (subtitled A Problem in Deduction) is an English language American novel written in 1933 by Ellery Queen. It is the seventh of the Ellery Queen mysteries.

== Plot summary ==
Inspector Queen and his son Ellery are vacationing in a mountainous area of the United States when they are forced by a forest fire to seek shelter at Arrow Head, the mountaintop home of famous surgeon Dr. John Xavier, which soon becomes impossible to escape due to the fire. There the sleuths meet an unusual assortment of characters, beginning with Dr. Xavier and his wife Sarah; his brother Mark; his medical assistant Percival Holmes; his handyman "Bones"; the housekeeper, Mrs. Wheary; and a houseguest, Ann Forrest. Miss Forrest has recently lost a silver ring; Dr. Holmes likewise finds himself missing a cheap signet ring. That night, Ellery spies a strange crab-like shape moving in the upstairs hallway, and, independently, Inspector Queen discovers that also present at the house is the wealthy Marie Carreau, a fixture of Washington high society; Ann is Mrs. Carreau's personal secretary. In the morning, Dr. Xavier is found dead in his study — shot twice with a revolver which has been wiped clean of any fingerprints. In his right hand he clutches the torn half of a playing card: the six of spades.

The previous night, the Queens had encountered on the road a heavyset and unsavory man, who — his escape blocked by the fire — now returns to the house, giving his name unconvincingly as "Smith." It is further revealed that Marie Carreau had come to the house to consult with Dr. Xavier on the subject of her teenage sons, Julian and Francis, who are xiphopagous conjoined twins. It was the twins who had cast the crab-like shadow seen by Ellery in the hallway. Meanwhile, the Inspector makes the connection between the six of spades and Mrs. Xavier's initials — Sarah Isère Xavier — and accuses her of murdering the surgeon in a jealous rage at his lengthy conferences with Mrs. Carreau. Mrs. Xavier instantly confesses to the murder and collapses in a faint. However, Ellery observes that Dr. Xavier, who was right-handed, would naturally have used his right hand to crumple and discard half of the card, which would leave the uncrumpled half clutched in his left hand. It follows that the playing card must have been torn and placed in Xavier's hand by some left-handed person — that is, by the murderer.

The Queens investigate Dr. Xavier's laboratory and find that Xavier has been experimenting with the separation of conjoined twins of various animal species — always without success — and that "Bones" has been burying the failures in the garden. That night, the Queens search Mrs. Xavier's jewel-box and find that it contains no rings at all. The next morning, the party attempt to find a way past the increasingly menacing forest fire, but to no avail. Ellery observes a conversation between Smith and Mrs. Carreau, and deduces that Smith had been blackmailing Carreau, threatening to publicize the existence of her sons — but that the murder, sure to draw publicity, had neutralized Smith's hold over Carreau. The Queens conduct a series of "tests" to prove that each member of the party is right-handed, except for Mark Xavier; on this evidence, Ellery accuses Mark of murdering Dr. Xavier and planting the card to throw suspicion on Mrs. Xavier. Mark, in a panic, tries to escape; Inspector Queen shoots him and returns him to the house, gravely wounded. Mark confesses that he planted the torn card to frame Mrs. Xavier, but insists that Dr. Xavier was dead before Mark entered the room — and insists that he knows who the killer is! But Holmes' morphine takes effect before Mark can reveal the murderer's identity. Inspector Queen stands watch over Mark and is there at 1 a.m. when Mark regains consciousness; but when Ellery comes down at 2 a.m. to check on his father, he finds the Inspector chloroformed and Mark Xavier dead — poisoned by oxalic acid — clutching in his right hand the torn half of a jack of diamonds.

Ellery finds Mrs. Carreau awake in her room, which is suspicious. Inspector Queen discovers that while he was chloroformed, somebody stole the wedding ring off his finger. The party return to their rooms. When somebody tries to break into the safe where Xavier's original deck of playing cards was being kept as evidence, Ellery on a hunch counts the cards in that deck and discovers that it is missing two cards — the six of spades and the jack of diamonds! The Queens deduce that when Mark found his brother's body, Dr. Xavier had been clutching a torn jack, which Mark replaced with the six of spades to frame his sister-in-law (because with her out of the way, Mark stood to inherit Xavier's estate). When Mark in turn was murdered, he must have decided that the best way to clue at his murderer's identity would be to reproduce Dr. Xavier's authentic clue — the jack of diamonds. Further, Ellery observes that the French name for the suit of diamonds is carreaux, and the image on a jack is that of two conjoined young men! He concludes that (because the card was torn in half) only one of the Carreau twins is the murderer, and suggests that the twin may have killed Xavier in self-defense, out of fear that Xavier would try (and fail) to separate the twins surgically. The Queens speculate on the "beautiful headache" such a case would present: Murder is a capital offense, but supposing only one of the twins to be guilty of murder, what would become of the other?

Meanwhile, the fire has been creeping closer and closer to the summit. An airplane drops a message from the local sheriff, informing the party that all attempts to contain the fire have failed and advising them to dig firebreaks around the house. They dig through the night and into the following afternoon; but the fire jumps their trench and reaches the house. The party retreat to the cellar as the house burns above them. Ellery now confronts the blackmailer Smith; it is revealed that Smith was one of the doctors in attendance at the Carreau twins' birth, and has been blackmailing Mrs. Carreau for sixteen years. Ellery now rejects his theory that the murderer is one of the twins, and even that the torn jack of diamonds is an authentic clue at all. The jack in Xavier's right hand, which Mark had replaced with a six to frame Mrs. Xavier, still could not have been an authentic clue from the right-handed Xavier. Furthermore, Ellery discovered the missing jack only after the murderer's feeble attempt to break into the safe, when all the time the key to the safe was in the pocket of the chloroformed Inspector Queen! This indicates that the murderer was trying to draw attention to the Carreau twins — and away from his true identity.

As the party continue to cower below the burning house, Ellery comes to the matter of the missing rings. As the murderer nonsensically removed even Inspector Queen's wedding band, he concludes that the murderer must be a kleptomaniac on the specific subject of rings. He dramatically removes his own ring, places it in the center of the room, and waits for the kleptomaniac to crack. The gambit works; Mrs. Xavier cannot stand the tension and shrieks her confession. Her jewel-box contained no rings because Dr. Xavier had known of her kleptomania; that was why he'd kept her isolated on the mountain away from anything that could trigger it. She indeed had killed her husband out of jealousy; planted the torn card to frame the Carreau twins; and, when accused by Ellery, confessed truthfully — which told Mark that he'd accidentally "framed" the real murderer. She then killed Mark, again leaving a jack of diamonds in an attempt to frame the Carreaus.

Having confessed, Mrs. Xavier dashes up the cellar stairs and disappears into the flames — certainly to her death. A few minutes later, it begins to rain.

== Literary significance and criticism ==
This novel was the seventh in a long series of novels featuring Ellery Queen, the first nine containing a nationality in the title.

The introduction to this novel contained a detail which is now not considered part of the Ellery Queen canon. The introduction is written as by the anonymous "J.J. McC.", a friend of the Queens. Other details of the lives of the fictional Queen family contained in earlier introductions have now disappeared and are never mentioned again; the introductory device of "J.J. McC." lasts only through the tenth novel, Halfway House, then vanishes (though J.J. appears onstage in Face to Face in 1967).

The "nationality" mysteries had the unusual feature of a "Challenge to the Reader" just before the ending is revealed—the novel breaks the fourth wall and speaks directly to the reader, stating that all essential facts have been revealed and the solution to the mystery is now possible. This novel is the only one of the nationality title mysteries by Ellery Queen books that does not contain such a challenge, as explained in the introduction to the subsequent novel, where the author admits to having forgotten it.
