= Boots and Saddles (film) =

1937 film by Joseph Kane

- Theatrical release poster
- Directed by: Joseph Kane
- Screenplay by: Jack Natteford; Oliver Drake
- Story by: Jack Natteford
- Produced by: Sol C. Siegel
- Starring: Gene Autry; Smiley Burnette; Judith Allen
- Cinematography: William Nobles
- Edited by: Lester Orlebeck
- Music by: Raoul Kraushaar
- Production company: Republic Pictures
- Distributed by: Republic Pictures
- Release date: October 4, 1937
- Running time: 54 minutes
- Country: United States
- Language: English

Boots and Saddles is a 1937 American Western film directed by Joseph Kane and starring Gene Autry, Smiley Burnette and Judith Allen. It was produced and distributed by Republic Pictures. Based on a story by Jack Natteford, the film is about a young Englishman who inherits a ranch that he wants to sell, but is turned into a real Westerner by a singing cowboy.

== Plot ==
Following the death of his father, Edward (Ronald Sinclair), the young Earl of Granville, travels from England with his solicitor, Henry Wyndham (John Ward), to his father's ranch in the Western United States. There he is welcomed by ranch foreman Gene Autry (Gene Autry) and his sidekick Frog Millhouse (Smiley Burnette) who promised their late friend that they would make a real Westerner of his son. Gene is surprised by Edward's arrogant demeanor and dismayed to learn that Wyndham plans to sell the ranch, which is deeply in debt.

After Gene rescues Edward from a runaway horse, Edward apologizes for his earlier behavior, leading Gene to conclude that the young Englishman is a "regular fellow". They give him the nickname "Spud", which was also his father's nickname, and encourage him not to sell the ranch. Soon after, Jim Neale (Bill Elliott), a wealthy rancher to whom the late earl owed money, approaches Edward and offers to buy the ranch, warning him that if he does not pay the money his father owed him, he will take him to court. Neale unknowingly inspires them to sell their cow ponies to the Army to raise the money necessary to save the ranch. A few days later, proves his mettle by helping round up the horses and drive them back to the ranch.

Intending to sell the horses to Colonel Allen (Guy Usher) at Fort Wayne, Gene and the others head along the dusty roads in their wagons, at one point deliberately dusting the passengers of a buggy. Gene doesn't know that the buggy contains Neale, Colonel Allen, and his daughter Bernice (Judith Allen). Later at the fort, Bernice recognizes Gene when he comes to the colonel's quarters. Pretending to be a maidservant, she falsely tells Gene that Colonel Allen is hard of hearing, and the next day, the colonel is annoyed by Gene's yelling at him during the horse auction.

The bids offered by Gene and Neale are identical, so Colonel Allen proposes that they each race twelve horses the next morning to see who wins the contract. That night, while Gene manages to elude Neale's henchment, Edward locks up a process server attempting to serve a summons giving Neale all their property. Meanwhile, Gene reveals to Bernice that he knows who she is. While they are quarreling, Gene spots a fire in the barn where his horses are being kept and rushes to save them. Afterwards, Frog tells Gene that he doesn't know who knocked him out and started the blaze, but he did manage to grab the man's watch in the struggle, which can be used to identify the arsonist.

The next morning, Gene enters the race with the five horses he has left. Edward tells Bernice what a fine person Gene is for helping him. Frog discovers that the watch belongs to Neale's henchman, Joe Larkins (Bud Osborne). Despite Neale's dirty tricks, Gene manages to win the race, and Edward's ranch is awarded the contract. Afterwards, Larkins reveals Neales's underhanded schemes, and Gene and Bernice put their differences behind them.

== Cast ==
- Gene Autry as Gene Autry
- Smiley Burnette as Frog Millhouse
- Judith Allen as Bernice Allen
- Ronald Sinclair as Spud aka Edward, Earl of Grandby
- Guy Usher as Colonel Allen
- Bill Elliott as Jim Neale
- John Ward as Henry 'Windy' Wyndham
- Frankie Marvin as Shorty
- Chris-Pin Martin as Juan
- Stanley Blystone as Army Sergeant
- Bud Osborne as Henchman Joe Larkins
- Champion as Gene's Horse (uncredited)

== Production ==
=== Stuntwork ===
- Yakima Canutt
- Ken Cooper
- Duke Taylor
- Joe Yrigoyen

=== Filming locations ===
- Alabama Hills, Lone Pine, California, USA
- CBS Studio Center, 4024 Radford Avenue, Studio City, Los Angeles, California, USA
- Lone Pine Station, Lone Pine, California, USA
- Whitney Portal Road, Lone Pine Creek Canyon, Lone Pine, California, USA

=== Soundtrack ===
- "Take Me Back To My Boots and Saddle" (Teddy Powell, Walter G. Samuels, Leonard Whitcup) by Gene Autry and the townsfolk
- "Take Me Back To My Boots and Saddle" (Teddy Powell, Walter G. Samuels, Leonard Whitcup) by Gene Autry and the ranch hands at the end
- "Ridin' the Range" (Fleming Allen, Gene Autry, Nelson Shawn) by Gene Autry (vocals and guitar) and the ranch hands
- "Dusty Roads" (Smiley Burnette) by Smiley Burnette
- "Cielito Lindo" (Traditional) by Cecilia Callejo (vocals) and the band in the Spanish cafe
- "The One Rose (That's Left in My Heart)" (Del Lyons and Lani McIntyre) by Gene Autry (vocals) and the band in the Spanish cafe
- "Why did I Get Married" (Carson Robison) by Gene Autry (vocals and guitar)
