= Mack V. Wright =

American actor and director (1894–1965)

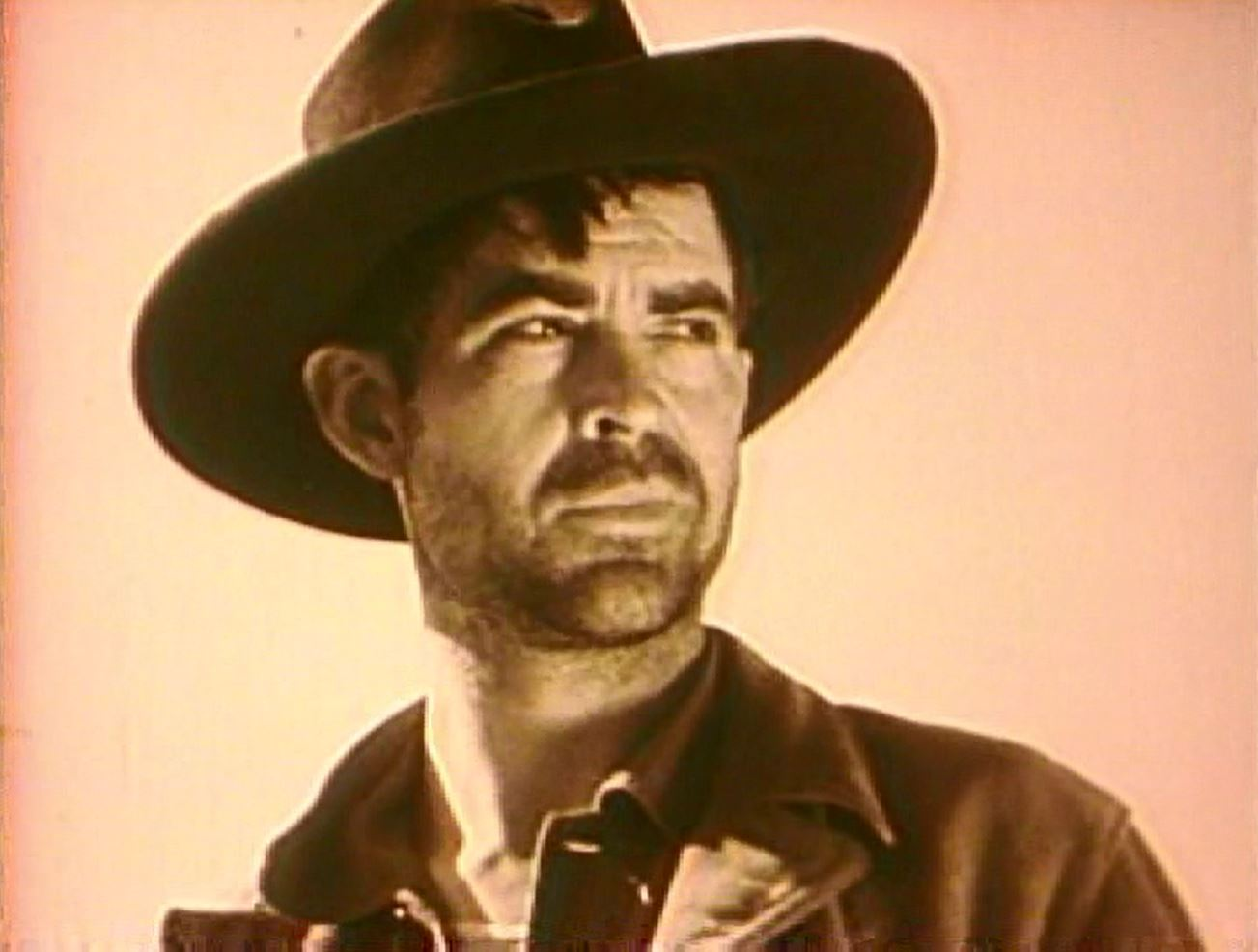
- Wright in Arizona Days (1928)
- Born: March 9, 1894; Princeton, Indiana
- Died: August 14, 1965 (aged 71); Boulder City, Nevada
- Occupations: Actor, film director
- Years active: 1914–1961

Mack V. Wright (March 9, 1894 – August 14, 1965) was an American actor and film director. Active as a director from 1920 to the late 1940s, he also had an extensive career as an assistant director, second-unit director and production manager. His heyday was in the 1930s, when he directed or co-directed serials for Republic Pictures and made westerns for Monogram Pictures, often with John Wayne. He was also an actor, appearing in his first film in 1914 and his last in 1934, almost all of them westerns.

== Selected filmography ==
Director

- Wolf Tracks (1920)
- Masked (1920)
- Thieves' Clothes (1920)
- The Broncho Kid (1920)
- Red Blood (1926)
- The Texas Terror (1926)
- Tarzan and the Golden Lion (1927)
- Manhattan Cowboy (1928)
- South of the Rio Grande (1932)
- Haunted Gold (1932)
- The Lone Bandit (1935)
- The Outlaw Tamer (1935)
- Tumbling Tumbleweeds (1935)
- The Big Show (1936)
- Roarin' Lead (1936)
- Robinson Crusoe of Clipper Island (1936)
- The Singing Cowboy (1936)
- The Vigilantes Are Coming (1936)
- Heart of the Rockies (1937)
- Hit the Saddle (1937)
- Range Defenders (1937)
- Riders of the Whistling Skull (1937)
- Roaring Six Guns (1937)
- Rootin' Tootin' Rhythm (1937)
- Spirit of Youth (1938)
- Phantom of Chinatown (1940)
- Forbidden Trails (1941)
- King of the Zombies (1941)
- Murder by Invitation (1941) (assistant director)
- Gangs, Inc. (1941)
- Below the Border (1942)
- Dawn on the Great Divide (1942)
- Down Texas Way (1942)
- Ghost Town Law (1942)
- Riders of the West (1942)
- West of the Law (1942)
- Cobra Woman (1944)
- The Mummy's Curse (1944)
- Alimony (1949)
- The Flying Saucer (1950)
- Why Men Leave Home (1951)
- Phantom from Space (1953)
- The Big Combo (1955)
- Five Minutes to Live (1961) (assistant director)

Wright also directed the following films that starred John Wayne:

- Range Feud (1931)
- Haunted Gold (1932)
- The Man from Monterey (1933)
- Somewhere in Sonora (1933)
- Randy Rides Alone (1934)
- Winds of the Wasteland (1936)

Production Manager

- Spirit of Youth (1938)
- Crime, Inc. (1941)
- King of the Zombies (1941)
- Killers from Space (1954)
- The Snow Creature (1954)
- Ma Barker's Killer Brood (1960)

Actor

- The Master Key (1914)
- The Bar Sinister (1917)
- The Lion Man (1919)
- Red Courage (1921)
- Perils of the Yukon (1922)
- Single Handed (1923)
- Mistaken Orders (1925)
- Riders of Mystery (1925)
- Blood and Steel (1925)
- Unseen Enemies (1926)
- Silent Trail (1928)
- West of Santa Fe (1928)
- Law of the Mounted (1928)
- Headin' Westward (1929)
- Haunted Gold (1932) (director cameo)
- Randy Rides Alone (1934) (director cameo)
