= Git Along Little Dogies (film) =

1937 film by Joseph Kane

- Theatrical release poster
- Directed by: Joseph Kane
- Written by: Dorrell McGowan; Stuart E. McGowan
- Produced by: Armand Schaefer
- Starring: Gene Autry; Smiley Burnette; Maple City Four
- Cinematography: Gus Peterson
- Edited by: Tony Martinelli
- Production company: Republic Pictures
- Distributed by: Republic Pictures
- Release date: March 27, 1937 (USA)
- Running time: 54 minutes
- Country: United States
- Language: English

Git Along Little Dogies is a 1937 American Western film directed by Joseph Kane and starring Gene Autry, Smiley Burnette, and the Maple City Four. Written by Dorrell and Stuart E. McGowan, the film is about a singing cowboy who gets caught up in a war between oilmen and cattle ranchers, taking the side of the ranchers until he learns that oil will bring a railroad to town. The film is also known as Serenade of the West in the United Kingdom.

== Plot ==
When Doris Maxwell (Judith Allen) starts drilling for oil, cowboy Gene Autry (Gene Autry) tries to stop the drilling, believing the territory's water supply will be ruined. Doris' father, bank president Maxwell (William Farnum), embezzled $25,000 to support the drilling project. Doris and Gene's fight heats up after he shoots out the tires on her car and she steals his horse, Champion. In an attempt to discredit Gene, Doris, who runs a radio station above Sing Low's cafe, broadcasts him on a program sponsored by the oil company. When Gene discovers the trick, he sets out in a rage to find her.

George Wilkins (Weldon Heyburn), who is in charge of the oil well drilling, takes Doris to the drilling site and tell her the well is dry and he needs additional funds from her father to bring the well in. Doris doesn't know that Wilkins is actually trying to swindle her father by getting him to pay for all of the equipment while he stalls the drilling. Wilkins intends to take over the lease on the profitable land when the bank's lease runs out.

While taking the payroll to the drilling site, Wilkins and Doris are held up by two thieves, who are actually Wilkins' henchmen. Gene comes to the rescue and grudgingly returns the money to Doris, who continues on to the drilling site. Wilkins reprimands his men for getting caught and then lets them go. Doris and Gene return to the bank, where they discover Maxwell has tried to commit suicide after receiving a letter notifying him that the bank examiner would be arriving soon. Protecting Maxwell from embezzlement charges, Gene makes it seem as if Maxwell was shot during a robbery.

Sometime later, Gene learns that the railroad will go through the town if the oil comes in, and he informs Wilkins that he will publicly support the drilling. Not wanting any public attention on his operation, Wilkins orders his men to hold Gene captive until after the lease is transferred to him. Gene escapes and alerts the townspeople to Wilkins' crooked dealings. Wilkins spreads a rumor that Gene intentionally swindled his friends by making them buy worthless oil stock, and later tells a crowd that Gene was behind the bank robbery. A mob gathers and goes after Gene who is forced to flee.

At the oil well, Gene finds Sam Brown, an oil worker who was shot by Wilkins after he discovered that the well only needed to be dynamited to come in. After getting a doctor to treat Sam, Gene and Frog Millhouse (Smiley Burnette) dynamite the well, despite the opposition from Wilkins and the crowd. Following the blast, the well comes in and soon the oil company, now called the Maxwell-Autry company, is prospering. Gene distributes dividends to his friends on their investment, and Frog, who has been searching for an addition to his butterfly collection, discovers a poor specimen.

== Cast ==
- Gene Autry as Gene Autry, Circle A Ranch Owner
- Smiley Burnette as Frog Millhouse
- Maple City Four as Singing Ranch Hands
- Judith Allen as Doris Maxwell
- Weldon Heyburn as George Wilkins
- William Farnum as Banker Maxwell
- Willie Fung as Sing Low
- Carleton Young as First Holdup Man
- Will Ahern as Dancer
- Gladys Ahern as Dancer and Singer
- The Cabin Kids as Sam Brown's Singing Children
- Champion as Champ, Gene's Horse
- Art Janes as Member of Maple City Four (uncredited)
- Fritz Meissner as Member of Maple City Four (uncredited)
- Pat Petterson as Member of Maple City Four (uncredited)
- Al Rice as Member of Maple City Four (uncredited)

== Production ==
=== Stuntwork ===
- Tracy Layne
- Eddie Parker
- Bill Yrigoyen
- Joe Yrigoyen

=== Filming locations ===
- Kernville, California, USA

=== Soundtrack ===
- "Git Along Little (Harris Heyman, Snyder Miller) by Gene Autry, Smiley Burnette, and Maple City Four
- "Red River Valley" (Traditional) played on a record at the radio station
- "Red River Valley" (Traditional) by Maple City Four and audience at Radio Contest
- "Honey Bringing Honey To You" (Smiley Burnette) by Smiley Burnette (piano and vocal)
- "Chinatown My Chinatown" (Jean Schwartz, William Jerome) by Gene Autry, Maple City Four, and Smiley Burnette
- "If You Want to Be a Cowboy" (Fleming Allen) by Gene Autry, Maple City Four, and Smiley Burnette (piano)
- "Turkey in the Straw" (Traditional) by Art Davis (fiddle) at the Radio Contest
- "The Minstrel Boy" (Thomas Moore) by Oscar Gahan (guitar) at the Radio Contest
- "Oh! Susanna" (Stephen Foster) by an unidentified banjoist at the Radio Contest
- "Oh! Susanna" (Stephen Foster) by the Maple City Four and audience at Radio Contest
- "Pop! Goes the Weasel" (Traditional) by Smiley Burnette (accordion) at the Radio Contest
- "Arkansas Traveler" (Sandford C. Faulkner) by the Maple City Four at the Radio Contest
- "I'm Calamity Jane" by Gladys Ahern and Will Ahern at the Radio Contest
- "Stock Selling Song (We're the Boys From the Circle A)" by the Maple City Four at the Radio Contest
- "Stock Selling Song (We're the Boys From the Circle A)" by the Maple City Four, Gene Autry, and Frank Austin near the end
- "Wait For the Wagon" (George P. Knauff) by the Maple City Four at the Radio Contest
- "She'll Be Coming 'Round the Mountain" (Traditional) by the Maple City Four and audience at the Radio Contest
- "Long, Long Ago" (Thomas Haynes Bayly) by the Maple City Four and audience at the Radio Contest
- "Good Night Ladies" (Egbert Van Alstyne, Harry Williams) by the Maple City Four and audience at the Radio Contest
- "For He's a Jolly Good Fellow" (Traditional) by the audience at the Radio Contest
- "After You've Gone" (Henry Creamer, Turner Layton) by The Cabin Kids on the radio
- "In the Valley Where the Sun Goes Down" by Gene Autry on the radio
- "Happy Days Are Here Again" (Milton Ager, Jack Yellen) by Gene Autry and the Maple City Four and cast at the end
