= Arthur Henry Gooden =

English screenwriter

- Born: 23 October 1879; England, UK
- Died: 22 July 1971; Los Angeles, California, USA
- Occupation: Screenwriter
- Years active: 1916-1937

Arthur Henry Gooden (23 October 1879 – 22 July 1971) was an English screenwriter of the silent era. He wrote for 53 films between 1916 and 1937. He also wrote several western fiction novels about the American Old West. He was born in England and died in Los Angeles, California.

== Selected filmography ==
- A Dream or Two Ago (1916)
- The Ghost of the Rancho (1918)
- The Face in the Watch (1919)
- The Lone Hand (1919)
- The Double Hold-Up (1919)
- Roarin' Dan (1920)
- Wolf Tracks (1920)
- Thieves' Clothes (1920)
- The Broncho Kid (1920)
- The Smilin' Kid (1920)
- Superstition (1920)
- The Fightin' Fury (1921)
- Below the Deadline (1921)
- The Fox (1921)
- The Iron Man (1924)
- The Riddle Rider (1924)
- Hearts of the West (1925)
- The Winking Idol (1926)
- Whispering Smith Rides (1927)
- The Pirate of Panama (1929)
