= The Broncho Kid =

1920 film

- Directed by: Mack V. Wright
- Written by: Arthur Henry Gooden
- Starring: Hoot Gibson
- Release date: June 5, 1920
- Running time: 20 minutes
- Country: United States
- Languages: Silent; English intertitles

The Broncho Kid is a 1920 American short silent Western film directed by Mack V. Wright and featuring Hoot Gibson.

== Plot ==
This plot comes from the original copyright for the film at the Library of Congress. It seems incomplete.

The Broncho Kid is a reckless ne'er-do-well of a cowboy who drifts from ranch to ranch, working or idling as the fit takes him.

The Lazy M Ranch has among their outfit an outlaw horse which nobody has ever succeeded in riding.

The Broncho Kid sees the horse in the corral when nobody else is around and for the fun of the game ropes the horse and mounts him. The outlaw fights hard, but the Kid is his master. One of the boys of the Lazy M sees the kid riding the outlaw and thinks that the kid means to steal the horse, whereas the kid has only roped and ridden the beast because he had heard it was unridable and wanted to prove it wasn't. The Lazy M boy gallops up, catches the Kid's bridle, and cusses him for a horse-thief. The Kid digs spurs into the outlaw and breaks away.

He rides on and outdistances his pursuer. Presently he sees a runaway pony with a girl on its back tearing along the trail. The trail is perilously close to a precipice. The girl is June Blossom, the sheriff's daughter. The kid gallops after her and picks her from the saddle just as her pony falls over the edge and rolls down the steep slide.

— Arthur Henry Gooden, story and scenario

== Cast ==
- Hoot Gibson as the Broncho Kid
- Yvette Mitchell as the Sheriff's daughter
- Dudley Hendricks credited as D.C. Hendricks as the Sheriff
- Jim Corey as Wolf Larson

== See also ==
- List of American films of 1920
- Hoot Gibson filmography
