= Trouble at Midnight =

1937 film directed by Ford Beebe

- Theatrical release poster
- Directed by: Ford Beebe
- Screenplay by: Maurice Geraghty; Ford Beebe
- Based on: Night Patrol by Kimball Herrick
- Produced by: Barney Sarecky
- Starring: Noah Beery Jr. Kay Hughes; Larry J. Blake; Bernadene Hayes; Louis Mason; Earl Dwire
- Cinematography: Jerome Ash
- Edited by: John Rawlins
- Production company: Universal Pictures
- Distributed by: Universal Pictures
- Release date: October 17, 1937
- Running time: 69 minutes
- Country: United States
- Language: English

Trouble at Midnight is a 1937 American action film directed by Ford Beebe, written by Maurice Geraghty and Ford Beebe, and starring Noah Beery Jr., Kay Hughes, Larry J. Blake, Bernadene Hayes, Louis Mason and Earl Dwire. It was released on October 17, 1937, by Universal Pictures.

== Cast ==
- Noah Beery Jr. as Kirk Cameron
- Kay Hughes as Catherine Benson
- Larry J. Blake as Tony Michaels
- Bernadene Hayes as Marion
- Louis Mason as Elmer
- Earl Dwire as Henry Goff
- Charles Halton as Everett Benson
- Frank Melton as Frank Cordeen
- Henry Hunter as Dick Cameron
- George Humbert as Nick
- Harlan Briggs as Sheriff
- Guy Edward Hearn as DeHoff
- Harry C. Bradley as Doctor
