= Hope Loring =

English screenwriter (1894–1959)

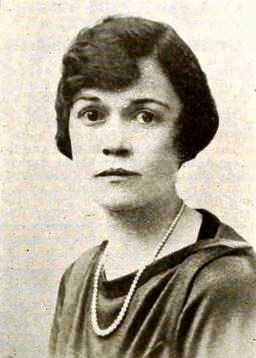
- Moving Picture World, 1919
- Born: 29 January 1894; England
- Died: 17 January 1959 (aged 64); Mallorca, Spain
- Occupation: Screenwriter
- Years active: 1918–1931
- Spouse: Louis D. Lighton
- Relatives: Jane Loring

Hope Loring (29 January 1894 – 17 January 1959) was an English screenwriter. She wrote for 63 films between 1918 and 1931. She was born in England and died in Mallorca, Spain. She was married to fellow screenwriter and producer Louis D. Lighton. She also directed the play Caprice at Harold Lloyd's Beverly Hills Little Theatre for Professionals.

== Selected filmography ==
- The Lure of the Circus (1918)
- The Red Glove (1919)
- Wolf Tracks (1920)
- Masked (1920)
- Thieves' Clothes (1920)
- The Vanishing Dagger (1920)
- The Beautiful Gambler (1921)
- The Blue Fox (1921)
- Thorns and Orange Blossoms (1922)
- Paid Back (1922)
- Don't Marry for Money (1923)
- The Woman of Bronze (1923)
- East Side - West Side (1923)
- K – The Unknown (1924)
- The Lullaby (1924)
- Cornered (1924)
- Little Annie Rooney (1925)
- Ranger of the Big Pines (1925)
- Wandering Footsteps (1925)
- The Crown of Lies (1926)
- The Blind Goddess (1926)
- Fig Leaves (1926)
- It (1927)
- Children of Divorce (1927)
- Wings (1927)
- The Woman on Trial (1927)
- Get Your Man (1927)
- The Showdown (1928)
- The Four Feathers (1929)
- Paris (1929)
- This Is Heaven (1929)
