= Wolf Tracks (1920 film) =

1920 film

- Directed by: Mack V. Wright
- Written by: Arthur Henry Gooden; Hope Loring; Mack V. Wright
- Starring: Hoot Gibson
- Release date: May 7, 1920
- Running time: 20 minutes
- Country: United States
- Languages: Silent; English intertitles

Wolf Tracks is a 1920 American short silent Western film directed by Mack V. Wright and featuring Hoot Gibson.

== Plot ==
This plot synopsis was published with the original copyright filing for the film in 1920:

Molly Hart, left penniless by the death of her father, mortgages her claim for $100 to unscrupulous Lefty Jack, owner of the Lost Ace saloon in order to open a small soda water parlor. But Lefty eager to foreclose on the claim puts a sign on his saloon reading "Free Liquor Here" so that when the boys of the G. M. ranch prepare to invade Molly's little shop, they are lured to other side by the prospect of "graft." All except Judd Sharon, boss of the ranch and in love with Molly. He forces the boys to come over and buy her drinks, even Lefty and wicked Wolf Larson, the bad man of the community.

Learning from Molly that the mortgage falls due the next day and that Lefty will not let her work the claim until it is paid Judd stays behind and makes for the Hart claim where Lefty and Wolf see him panning gold in the creek. They steal Judd's hat and horse and proceed to hold up the driver of the Big Horn Mining Co. carrying on his wagon $10,000 worth of gold. They get away with it, killing the driver, and leaving Judd's hat and horse on the scene. They head for the Hart cabin where they plan to hide the gold.

In the meantime, Judd had gotten sufficient gold dust to pay the mortgage, but stumbling down a ravine, he is rendered unconscious, arrested for hold-up and murder and imprisoned but freed by his faithful cowboys, escaping to Hart's cabin. When Lefty sends Molly a note "Am in Hart's cabin. Bring food" signed Judd, she anxiously sets out but is followed by the cowboys who suspect it is a ruse of Lefty and Wolf. The latter were in the cabin inspecting their haul and unsuspected by them, Judd had witnessed all.

When Molly enters and Lefty attempts to kiss her, Judd emerges and aiming his gun, the two bad men are forced to surrender. The cowboys, followed by the sheriff and his posse close in on them and they are arrested. As to Judd and Molly—they decide to become "pardners" for life.

== Cast ==
- Hoot Gibson
- Thelma Percy
- Tom London credited as Leonard Clapham
- Jim Corey
- Charles Newton
