= Fleming Allan =

American composer of Western music

Fleming Allan (February 2, 1904 – February 2, 1965) was an American composer of Western music, who helped make that genre popular in the 1930s.

Fleming Allan was born in California on February 2, 1904. His mother was a native of Sioux Falls, South Dakota. He worked at WLS (AM) in Chicago around the time that Gene Autry and Smiley Burnette were singing for that station, then moved to Hollywood. He spent most of the rest of his life in California, writing songs for many movies in the 1930s and 1940s.

For a period in the early 1950s, Allen and the Mesner brothers operated Intro Records, a BMI affiliate. In January 1954 he left this job to join Gene Autry's music publishing business.

Allan composed songs for western movies by Autry, Ken Curtis, Tim Holt, Rod Cameron, Ray Whitley, Bob Baker, George O'Brien, Roy Rogers and Dick Foran.

His songs were recorded by Roy Rogers (I've Sold My Saddle for an Old Guitar), Gene Autry (Old Buckaroo) and Eddie Dean.

He died in Los Angeles on his 61st birthday.

== Films ==
Fleming Allen composed songs for many western films, often performed by singing cowboys. They include:

- The Old Corral (1936)
- Boots and Saddles (1937)
- Git Along Little Dogies (1937)
- Public Cowboy No. 1 (1937)
- Rootin' Tootin' Rhythm (1937)
- Wild Horse Rodeo (1937)
- Sudden Bill Dorn (1937)
- Western Gold (1937)
- Courage of the West (1937)
- Range Defenders (1937)
- Yodelin' Kid from Pine Ridge (1937)
- Ghost Town Riders (1938)
- Prairie Justice (1938)
- Guilty Trails (1938)
- Black Bandit (1938)
- Outlaw Express (1938)
- Western Trails (1938)
- Saga of Death Valley (1939)
- Oklahoma Frontier (1939)
- Stunt Pilot (1939)
- Wolf Call (1939)
- Lure of the Wasteland (1939)
- Honor of the West (1939)
- The Tulsa Kid (1940)
- Rainbow Over the Range (1940)
- Stage to Chino (1940)
- Sierra Sue (1941)
- The Old Texas Trail (1944)
- Riders of the Santa Fe (1944)
- Lone Star Moonlight (1946)
- Singing on the Trail (1946)
- Throw a Saddle on a Star (1946)
- Over the Santa Fe Trail (1947)
- Brand of Fear (1949)
