= The Face in the Watch =

1919 film

- Directed by: Edward A. Kull
- Written by: Harvey Gates; Arthur Henry Gooden
- Starring: Hoot Gibson
- Cinematography: Universal Film Manufacturing Company
- Release date: October 15, 1919
- Running time: 20 minutes
- Country: United States
- Languages: Silent; English intertitles

The Face in the Watch is a 1919 American short silent Western film directed by Edward A. Kull and featuring Hoot Gibson.

== Plot ==
This summary is from the original Library of Congress copyright filing:

Shameless Salverson has dissipated his ranch and his fortune. He is out in a shack with his partner Lazarus. The sheriff arrives at the shack with a tax collector and shack and Shameless' belongings are to be sold to defray taxes.

Shameless and Lazarus hold up the stage. The payroll is not on board, but they line up the passengers and go through their pockets. One of the passengers is Salvation Nancy who is bringing her sick father out West. Shameless takes a book from an old man in the back of which is the girl's picture. He gives back the book but keeps the picture.

Salvation Nancy proceeds to convert the town. Nancy's father dies and the Sheriff has his game. He watches her with evil intent, but Shameless stops his little game.

Shameless also believes that Nancy is in love with another Salvationist and he breaks over and drinks in consequence. In the saloon he plays cards with the Sheriff and gets cleaned out. He offers his watch as a stake and the sheriff in examining it finds Nancy's picture. This gives the clue as to who held up the stage and Shameless is seized and carried out for a lynching. Lazarus intervenes, holds off the crowd and gives Shameless a chance to escape, but he will not go — he does not want to live without Nancy. Nancy steps in and tells him, saying that she loves him makes a getaway with her and together they start a new life.

— Harvey Gates, story, Arthur Henry Gooden, scenario

== Cast ==
- Hoot Gibson as Shameless Salverson
- Josephine Hill as Nancy
- Harry Todd as Lazarus
- Duke R. Lee as the Sheriff

== See also ==
- List of American films of 1919
- Hoot Gibson filmography
