= Riders of the Badlands =

1941 film by Howard Bretherton

- Theatrical release poster
- Directed by: Howard Bretherton
- Screenplay by: Betty Burbridge
- Produced by: William Berke
- Starring: Charles Starrett; Russell Hayden; Cliff Edwards; Ilene Brewer; Kay Hughes; Roy Barcroft
- Cinematography: Benjamin H. Kline
- Edited by: Charles Nelson
- Production company: Columbia Pictures
- Distributed by: Columbia Pictures
- Release date: December 18, 1941
- Running time: 57 minutes
- Country: United States
- Language: English

Riders of the Badlands is a 1941 American Western film directed by Howard Bretherton and written by Betty Burbridge. The film stars Charles Starrett, Russell Hayden, Cliff Edwards, Ilene Brewer, Kay Hughes and Roy Barcroft. The film was released on December 18, 1941, by Columbia Pictures.

== Cast ==
- Charles Starrett as Steve Langdon / Mac Collins
- Russell Hayden as 'Lucky' Barton
- Cliff Edwards as Bones Mallory
- Ilene Brewer as Flo
- Kay Hughes as Celia
- Roy Barcroft as Captain Martin
- Rick Anderson as Sheriff Taylor
- Edith Leach as Ellen Taylor
- Ethan Laidlaw as Bill
- Harry Cording as Higgins
- Hal Price as Warden James
