= The Chinese Orange Mystery =

1934 novel by Ellery Queen

- Cover of the first US edition
- Author: Ellery Queen
- Language: English
- Series: Ellery Queen mysteries
- Genre: Mystery novel / Whodunnit
- Publisher: Stokes (US); Gollancz (UK)
- Publication date: 1934
- Publication place: United States
- Media type: Print
- OCLC: 212314235
- Preceded by: The Siamese Twin Mystery
- Followed by: The Spanish Cape Mystery

The Chinese Orange Mystery (subtitled A Problem in Deduction) is a novel that was written in 1934 by Ellery Queen. It is the eighth of the Ellery Queen mysteries. The book was first published in condensed form in the June 1934 issue of Redbook.

In a poll of 17 detective story writers and reviewers, this novel was voted as the eighth best locked room mystery of all time.

== Plot summary ==
A wealthy publisher and collector of precious stones and Chinese postage stamps has a luxurious suite in a hotel that serves to handle his non-publishing business and the comings and goings of his staff, his relatives, and his female friends. When an odd and anonymous little man arrives and refuses to state his business, no one is surprised; he is locked (from outside only) in an anteroom with a bowl of fruit (including tangerines, also known as Chinese oranges) and left to await the publisher's arrival. When the door is unlocked, though, a truly bizarre scene is displayed.

The little man's skull is crushed, his clothing is reversed, back to front, all the furnishings of the room have been turned backwards — and two African spears have been inserted between the body and its clothing, stiffening it into immobility. The circumstances are such that someone has been observing every entrance to the room, and no one has apparently entered or left. The situation is further complicated by some valuable jewelry and stamps, the publisher's business affairs and romantic affaires, and a connection with "backwardness" for seemingly every character. It takes the considerable talents of Ellery Queen to sort through the motives and lies and arrive at the twisted logic that underlies every aspect of this very unusual crime.

== Literary significance and criticism ==
(See Ellery Queen.) This novel was the eighth in a long series of novels featuring Ellery Queen, the first nine containing a nationality in the title.

The introduction to this novel contained a detail which is now not considered part of the Ellery Queen canon. The introduction is written as by the anonymous "J.J. McC.", a friend of the Queens. Other details of the lives of the fictional Queen family contained in earlier introductions have now disappeared and are never mentioned again; the introductory device of "J.J. McC." lasts only through the tenth novel, Halfway House, then vanishes (though J.J. appears onstage in Face to Face in 1967).

The "nationality" mysteries had the unusual feature of a "Challenge to the Reader" just before the ending is revealed—the novel breaks the fourth wall and speaks directly to the reader. "I maintain that at this point in your reading of The Chinese Orange Mystery you have all the facts in your possession essential to a clear solution of the mystery."

This was the only Ellery Queen novel to be included in a list of the top ten "impossible crime" mysteries of all time (created by noted locked-room mystery writer Edward D. Hoch). The Chinese Orange Mystery was eighth on the list.

== Film, TV or theatrical adaptations ==
The novel was loosely adapted for the 1936 film The Mandarin Mystery, starring Eddie Quillan as Ellery Queen. Some elements of the novel were used as the basis for the 1941 film Ellery Queen's Penthouse Mystery, which was then novelized as The Penthouse Mystery by a ghost writer and published as by Ellery Queen.
