= The Vigilantes Are Coming =

- Directed by: Ray Taylor; Mack V. Wright
- Written by: Maurice Geraghty; Winston Miller; John Rathmell; Leslie Swabacker
- Produced by: Nat Levine
- Starring: Robert Livingston; Kay Hughes; Guinn 'Big Boy' Williams; Raymond Hatton; Fred Kohler; Robert Warwick; William Farnum; Bob Kortman
- Cinematography: Edgar Lyons; William Nobles
- Edited by: Dick Fantl; Helene Turner
- Music by: Arthur Kay
- Distributed by: Republic Pictures
- Release dates: August 22, 1936 (serial); Early 1950s (TV)
- Running time: 12 chapters (229 minutes (serial); 6 26½-minute episodes (TV)
- Country: United States
- Language: English
- Budget: $82,616 (negative cost: $87,655)

The Vigilantes Are Coming is a 1936 American Republic film serial directed by Ray Taylor and Mack V. Wright. It was the third of the sixty six serials made by Republic Pictures (and the third released in 1936).

This serial was filmed between 28 May and 17 June 1936 under the working title of The Vigilantes. It was released two months later, on 22 August 1936, under the final title. In the early 1950s the serial was re-edited into six 26½ minute episodes for television.

== Plot ==
Following the discovery of gold in Mexican California in 1844, Russian Cossacks led by Count Ivan Raspinoff, in collusion with General Jason Burr, attempt to invade California and turn it into a Russian Colony with Burr as its dictator. In doing so they round up slaves to work the mines and General Burr has Don Loring's brother and father murdered to acquire their ore-rich land.

When Don returns, having been away at the time with Salvation, Whipsaw and Captain John Fremont, he assumes the masked identity of The Eagle to stop them and get his revenge.

He is aided by a group of vigilantes assembled from the Californian ranchers, fighting both General Burr's henchmen and Raspinoff's Cossacks, while awaiting the arrival of Captain Fremont's American troops before the colony becomes official.

== Cast ==
- Robert Livingston as Don Loring, the mild mannered church organist and the masked vigilante The Eagle
- Kay Hughes as Doris Colton, John Colton's daughter
- Guinn 'Big Boy' Williams as "Salvation", leader of the vigilantes
- Raymond Hatton as "Whipsaw", another Californian vigilante
- Fred Kohler as General Jason Burr, conspirator with Count Raspinoff aiming to become supreme dictator of Russian California
- Robert Warwick as Count Ivan Raspinoff, emissary of the Russian Tsar aiming to conquer Mexican California and claim its gold
- William Farnum as Father Jose, the local priest

Supporting cast

- Bob Kortman as Boris Petroff, a Cossack
- John Merton as Rance Talbot, one of General Burr's henchman
- Lloyd Ingraham as John Colton, Mining engineer held by General Burr
- William Desmond as "Anderson", Rancher/Vigilante
- Yakima Canutt as "Barsam", one of General Burr's henchman
- Tracy Layne as Clem Peters, Rancher/Vigilante
- Bud Pope as "Ivan", a Cossack
- Steve Clemente as "Pedro", one of General Burr's henchman
- Bud Osborne as "Harris", one of General Burr's henchman
- Ray "Crash" Corrigan as Captain John Charles Fremont, US Army Captain

== Production ==
Stedman states that The Vigilantes Are Coming "was a reworking of The Eagle, Rudolph Valentino's silent film." Harmon and Glut expand on that to say it was based on Zorro and The Lone Ranger Rides Again in addition to Valentino's The Eagle. However, no mention is made of this being a derivative work in William Witney's autobiography. The fact that it looks like Zorro, which led several countries to name the movie after Zorro: the film was named Zorro l'indomptable in France, Zorro – Der blutrote Adler in Germany, Zorro – den blodrøde ørn in Denmark and Zorro – veripunainen kotka in Finland. The main character is played by Robert Livingston, who would then play the actual Zorro in the movie The Bold Caballero, also released in 1936.

The serial was budgeted at $82,616 although the final negative cost was $87,655 (a $5,039, or 6.1%, overspend). Despite being overbudget, this was the cheapest Republic serial of 1936 as well as the second cheapest of them all. It was filmed between 28 May and 17 June 1936 under the working title The Vigilantes. The serial's production number was 418.

This was William Witney's first time working on a serial, although not as director (that would be The Painted Stallion in 1937). In The Vigilantes Are Coming he worked as a second unit director and as an extra (a Cossack). It was the only serial Republic produced in this year, 1936 (the first year of serial production for Republic), where the lead character did not share the name of the lead actor (although "Crash" Corrigan in the previous Republic serial, Undersea Kingdom, had his stage name created specifically for that serial).

=== Stunts ===
- Yakima Canutt as Don Loring (doubling Robert Livingston)
- Tommy Coats
- Ken Cooper
- Sam Garrett, roping double
- Ted Mapes
- Wally West

== Release ==
=== Theatrical ===
The Vigilantes Are Coming's official release date is 22 August 1936, although this is actually the date the sixth chapter was made available to film exchanges.

=== Television ===
In the early 1950s, The Vigilantes Are Coming was one of fourteen Republic serials edited into a television series. It was broadcast in six 26½-minute episodes.

== Chapter titles ==
1. The Eagle Strikes (31 min 24s)
2. Birth of the Vigilantes (20 min 51s)
3. Condemned by Cossacks (18 min 45s)
4. Unholy Gold (16 min 50s)
5. Treachery Unmasked (19 min 4s)
6. A Tyrant's Trickery (17 min 54s)
7. Wings of Doom (17 min 23s)
8. A Treaty with Treason (17 min 18s)
9. Arrow's Flight (17 min 59s)
10. Prison of Flame (18 min 26s)
11. A Race With Death (15 min 37s)
12. Fremont Takes Charge (17 min 45s)

_{Source:}

== Cliffhangers ==
1. The Eagle is shot and falls from a church bell tower.
2. The Eagle is locked inside the Powder Magazine when it explodes.
3. The Eagle is caught by a firing squad meant for Salvation.
4. The Eagle is caught under a hydraulic ore crusher.
5. The Eagle falls over a cliff under a hail of bullets.
6. The Eagle is knocked unconscious on a cart carrying powder when it explodes.
7. The Eagle trips and falls beneath the blades of four Cossacks.
8. A stagecoach carrying The Eagle and Count Raspinoff goes over a cliff.
9. The Eagle is shot off his horse and falls under the hooves of his pursuers.
10. The Eagle is locked in a burning building.
11. The Eagle is caught in several explosions and the resultant landslide.

== See also ==
- List of film serials
- List of film serials by studio

| Preceded by Undersea Kingdom (1936) | Republic Serial; The Vigilantes Are Coming (1936) | Succeeded by Robinson Crusoe of Clipper Island (1936) |
