= Winds of the Wasteland =

1936 American western film

- Film poster
- Directed by: Mack V. Wright
- Written by: Joseph F. Poland
- Produced by: Nat Levine
- Starring: John Wayne
- Cinematography: William Nobles
- Edited by: Robert Jahns
- Music by: Arthur Kay; Heinz Roemheld; Paul Van Loan
- Distributed by: Republic Pictures
- Release date: June 15, 1936
- Running time: 54 minutes
- Country: United States
- Language: English

Winds of the Wasteland is a 1936 Western film directed by Mack V. Wright and starring John Wayne and Phyllis Fraser. The film was released by Republic Pictures. The film was later released in a colorized version on Home video/DVD under the title Stagecoach Run. It features an early appearance from Jon Hall.

== Plot ==
In 1861, John Blair and his partner, Larry Adams are dismayed when the arrival of telegraph ends the Russell & Waddell Pony Express. Hoping to utilize their horse-riding skills, they decide to start a stage coach transportation business. They go to Buchanan City and ask local magnate Cal Drake if he is willing to sell them a stage coach. Instead, Drake offers them a franchise from his own stage coach line - a line out to bustling Crescent City.

Upon arriving at Crescent City, Blair and Adams quickly realize that they had been bamboozled into paying for the line as Crescent City is a ghost town. The only residents are the mayor, Rocky O'Brien, and Dr. William Forsythe, Drake's ex-partner. O'Brien is pleased to get two new residents, doubling the population of the town, and a stagecoach line too. He tells Blair and Adams that Drake is as crooked as a snake. Blair protests that there are no customers to transport. The mayor says there is a way for Blair to get all the money he owes and more. There will be a contest in the next few days where the fastest team in a race will win a $25,000 government contract to deliver mail to the area. Blair goes to Buchanan city to enter the race. The only other entrant is Drake, the other stage lines having been scared off. Blair gets into a fight with one of Drake's henchmen, which he wins. A female passenger who is taking the stage to Crescent City, much to Blair's surprise, is not impressed with Blair's brawling in the street.

On the way to Crescent City, the passenger reveals she is Doc Forsythe's daughter, Barbara. Forsythe has not told his daughter the city is practically empty, and she has not told him she is coming. Barbara is very disappointed in Crescent City. She wants to leave but Forsythe says he can't leave. At that moment a settler's wagon arrives with a sick child. Forsythe says the child needs rest. O'Brein says they should settle in Crescent City, adding they have a new schoolteacher, meaning Barbara, to her surprise.

Blair meets a telegraph crew, whom he saves from poisoning after drinking from a local water hole. In appreciation, the telegraph crew offers to run the line through Crescent City, instead of Buchanan City, if Blair can find fifty laborers to build the telegraph line. Blair announces to the townsfolk of Buchanan City that he will pay $10/day for laborers and gets an overwhelmingly positive response.

Drake, upset that Blair has turned his con into a competing business, offers to hire him to drive a gold shipment to Sacramento. If Blair can get the gold to the destination, Drake will take $1,000 off of the original loan. Drake plots to ambush Blair using the escort he convinces Blair to take with him. Blair and Adams, who is driving their stage back to Crescent City, agree Drake is probably up to something. Blair tricks the escort and delivers the gold, then returns and when Drake hesitates, forces him at gunpoint to honor the $1000 payment on the loan.

At Crescent City, Forsythe is thrilled that the town is prospering, but Barbara says it won't last. When the stage Adams was driving arrives at Crescent City the passengers reveal Adams has been wounded in an ambush. On examination Forsythe tells Blair the bullet is lodged near Adam's spine and it will take a difficult operation to save his life. He also tells Blair he doesn't have the confidence to attempt the operation. Barbara and Blair convince him to try. The operation is a success.

The night before the race, two of Drake's men set fire to the barn where Blair stage coach is stored. Blair and O'Brien discover them, saving the coach and horses, and Blair shoots at them, killing one. Drake issues a warrant for Blair's arrest which the sheriff carries out. Forsythe bails Blair out of jail just after the race starts, with O'Brien driving the Crescent City stage. Blair catches up to the stage but they are behind Drake. Despite Drake's men's attempted bushwhacking, Blair manages to narrowly win the race, and the $25,000 reward.

== Cast ==
- John Wayne as John Blair
- Phyllis Fraser as Barbara Forsythe
- Lew Kelly as Mayor Rocky O'Brien
- Douglas Cosgrove as Cal Drake (Buchanan Stage Line)
- Lane Chandler as Larry Adams (Blair's partner)
- Sam Flint as Dr. William "Doc" Forsythe
- Bob Kortman as Cherokee Joe (henchman)
- Ed Cassidy as Mr. Dodge (Pony Express manager)
- Jon Hall as Jim (Pony Express rider)
- Merrill McCormick as Henchman Pete
- Christian J. Frank as Telegraph Crew Chief
- Jack Rockwell as Buchanan City Marshal
- Arthur Millett as Postmaster in Buchanan City
- Tracy Layne as Reed

== See also ==
- John Wayne filmography
