= Masked (film) =

1920 film

- Directed by: Mack V. Wright
- Written by: Harvey Gates; Hope Loring
- Starring: Hoot Gibson
- Release date: May 15, 1920
- Running time: 20 minutes
- Country: United States
- Languages: Silent; English intertitles

Masked is a 1920 American short silent Western film directed by Mack V. Wright and featuring Hoot Gibson.

== Plot ==
This summary was filed with the original copyright application for the film at the Library of Congress:

Jack Morgan, a happy-go-lucky ranger, is disappointed when his father fails to send him a money gift sufficient to enable him to marry Ruth Machin. Worse yet, Ruth tells him she will not marry him unless he has earned $5,000 of his own. Jack, therefore, decides to carry out a fake hold-up on his father, demand $5,000 ransome and marry Ruth, but unfortunately for him his plans are overheard by a band of outlaws.

Richard, the father, planning a pleasant surprise for his son, rigs himself out in a western outfit, and being a parson, feels thoroughly uncomfortable. John, Ruth's father, having attended a political convention in Richard's town that day, boards the same stage as Richard, just as uncomfortable as he is in a frock coat. They get into a heated political argument, being of opposite convictions, and are interrupted by the real outlaws, who take Machin in a frock coat for Morgan, the minister, and kidnap him. They discover their mistake, but write Ruth for the $5,000 ransom for her father.

In the meantime Jack, scenting real danger, has found his father, left him in Ruth's care and proceeded to the cave of the bandits, where Machin had been taken. After a fearful fight, abetted by his pals, he overcomes them. Ruth arrives with Morgan, who has kindly loaned her the ransom money. Jack, seeing them coming, gets his men to dress up as bandits. Disguised as one himself, he demands the ransom money of Richard for Machin, and then orders his father, as a parson, to marry him to Ruth. Ruth, who in the meantime had seen through the ruse, says, "Anything to save my father," and thus Jack wins his girl and has earned the $5,000 in addition.

== Cast ==
- Hoot Gibson
- Virginia Browne Faire
- Dan Crimmins
- Nelson McDowell
- Jim Corey
- Tom London
