= Yodelin' Kid from Pine Ridge =

1937 film by Joseph Kane

- Theatrical release poster
- Directed by: Joseph Kane
- Screenplay by: Jack Natteford; Dorrell McGowan; Stuart E. McGowan
- Story by: Jack Natteford
- Produced by: Nat Levine (uncredited)
- Starring: Gene Autry; Smiley Burnette; Betty Bronson
- Cinematography: William Nobles
- Edited by: Lester Orlebeck
- Music by: Raoul Kraushaar (supervisor)
- Production company: Republic Pictures
- Distributed by: Republic Pictures
- Release date: June 14, 1937 (US)
- Running time: 60 minutes
- Country: United States
- Language: English

Yodelin' Kid from Pine Ridge is a 1937 American Western film directed by Joseph Kane and starring Gene Autry, Smiley Burnette, and Betty Bronson. Based on a story by Jack Natteford, the film is about the son of a Southeastern cattleman who becomes entangled in a war between the cattlemen and "turpentiners" who make their living harvesting pine tree sap.

== Plot ==
In a large pine forest in the American Southeast called Pine Ridge, a feud is ongoing between cattlemen who want to burn the forest for grazing land, and "turpentiners" who make their living harvesting pine sap. The cattlemen suspect that the turpentiners are rustling their cattle, not knowing that the man organizing the rustling is Len Parker (LeRoy Mason), a cattleman. Arthur Autry is among the cattlemen who believe they should raid the turpentiners and burn them out. Arthur's fair-minded son, Gene Autry (Gene Autry), opposes the action, and is in love with Milly Baynum (Betty Bronson), the stepdaughter of the leader of the turpentiners. When Gene warns the turpentiners of the upcoming raid, his good intentions backfire as the turpentiners fight back and his father is wounded. Believing that Gene was fighting against the cattlemen, his father disowns him, and Gene leaves his home.

Two years later, Gene returns to Pine Ridge as the star of Colonel Frog Millhouse's Wild West show. Although glad to see Milly again, Gene is distraught to learn that his father is now destitute after his cattle were secretly stolen by Parker. After paying all of his father's bills, Gene learns from Milly that Arthur's cattle have been grazing in a distant meadow, and when Gene investigates, he is captured by two of Parker's henchmen. Parker orders his henchmen to replace Arthur's cattle with his own and take the stolen animals to Fox Canyon.

Back in town, Frog waits anxiously for Gene's arrival so the show can begin. One of Parker's henchmen tells Frog about Gene being captured. Frog is forced to start the show using a double for Gene. Believing that Gene has escaped, Parker orders his right-hand man, Jeff Galloway (Jack Dougherty), to kill him, and Galloway shoots the double. Meanwhile, Gene, who has escaped his captors, arrives back in town and learns about the crime. He tells Sheriff Martin (Henry Hall) to meet him at Arthur's ranch. When he arrives, Gene discovers that his father is dead, and rushing over to the Baynum cabin, Gene finds Milly's stepfather Bayliss has also been murdered. Because Bayliss was bludgeoned with Gene's gun, which Parker's men had stolen, Sheriff Martin arrests Gene for the murder and takes him to jail.

Believing that Gene will be set free because he is a cattleman, the turpentiners arrive at the jail intending to lynch him. Frog, Martin, and Milly prevent the lynching and Gene escapes. He goes to Parker's office, where he finds a receipt for the sale of his father's cattle. While Gene attempts to take Parker and Galloway to the sheriff, a gun battle between the cattlemen and turpentiners breaks out in the street and Parker, who killed both Arthur and Bayliss, gets away. Gene and his fellow entertainers chase after Parker and his men, and while the show people round up the gang, Gene apprehends Parker who is taken to jail. With the feud now ended, Gene and Milly decide to get married.

== Cast ==
- Gene Autry as Gene Autry
- Smiley Burnette as Frog Millhouse
- Betty Bronson as Milly Baynum
- LeRoy Mason as Len Parker
- Charles B. Middleton as Gene Autry Sr.
- Russell Simpson as Bayliss Baynum
- The Tennessee Ramblers as Musicians
- Jack Dougherty as Jeff Galloway
- Guy Wilkerson as Turpentiner Zeke
- Frankie Marvin as Luke
- Henry Hall as Sheriff Martin
- Fred 'Snowflake' Toones as Sam
- Champion as Gene's Horse (uncredited)

== Production ==
=== Stuntwork ===
- Yakima Canutt
- Cliff Lyons
- Wally West
- Joe Yrigoyen

=== Filming locations ===
- Kernville, California, USA

=== Soundtrack ===
- "Yodelin' Kid from Pine Ridge" (William Lava, Jack Stanley)
- "Sing Me a Song of the Saddle" (Gene Autry, Frank Harford) by Gene Autry
- "Hittin' the Trail" by Gene Autry
- "The Millhouse Wild West Show" by Gene Autry, Smiley Burnette, and Others
- "Pop Goes the Weasel" (Charles Twiggs) in "The Millhouse Wild West Show"
- "Molly Put the Kettle On" (Traditional) by Smiley Burnette and The Tennessee Ramblers
- "Red River Valley" (James Kerrigen) by The Tennessee Ramblers
- "She'll Be Comin' Round the Mountain" (Traditional) by The Tennessee Ramblers
- "When a Circus Comes to Town" (Traditional) by The Tennessee Ramblers to the tune of "She'll Be Comin' Round the Mountain"
- "An der schönen, blauen Donau (On the Beautiful Blue Danube), Op.314" (Johann Strauß) by The Tennessee Ramblers
- "Home, Sweet Home" (H.R. Bishop) by The Tennessee Ramblers
- "Back in Santa Fe" (Fleming Allen) by Gene Autry
- "Swing Low, Sweet Chariot" (Traditional) by an unidentified group of African Americans

== Memorable quotes ==
- Col. Millhouse: Marvelous, Autry, marvelous! You certainly have that animal trained and I don't see how you do it. What's the secret?

Gene Autry: The secret in training a horse, Colonel, is that, ah, you have to know more than the horse!
