= A Man Betrayed (1936 film) =

1936 American film by John H. Auer

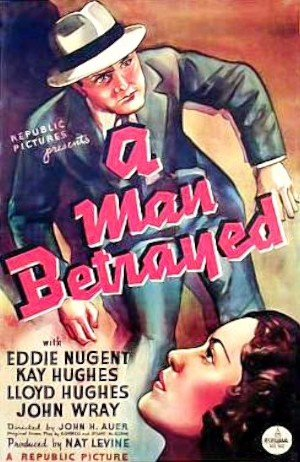
- Theatrical poster
- Directed by: John H. Auer
- Written by: Dorrell McGowan (story and screenplay); Stuart E. McGowan (story and screenplay)
- Produced by: William Berke (associate producer); Nat Levine (producer)
- Starring: Edward J. Nugent; Kay Hughes; Lloyd Hughes
- Cinematography: Ernest Miller
- Edited by: Roy V. Livingston
- Production company: Republic Pictures
- Distributed by: Republic Pictures
- Release date: December 28, 1936
- Running time: 58 minutes 53 minutes (American edited version)
- Country: United States
- Language: English

A Man Betrayed is a 1936 American comedy crime drama film directed by John H. Auer and starring Edward J. Nugent, Kay Hughes and Lloyd Hughes. It was produced and distributed by Republic Pictures.

== Plot ==
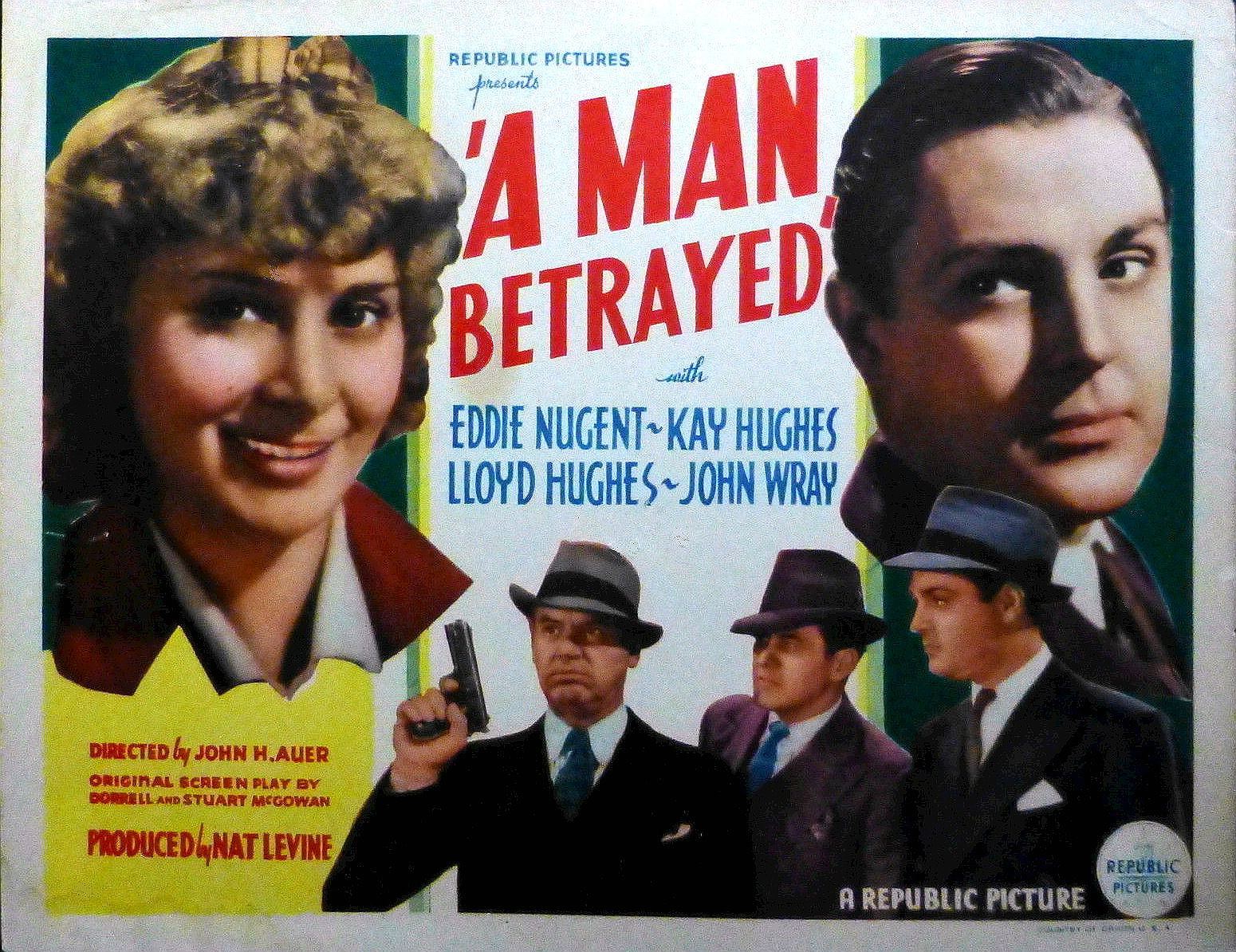
Lobby card

Frank Powell sells stock for an oil company. When he learns that the company is a scam, he confronts his three bosses: Carlton, Richards and Burns. He then travels to Miami to investigate the company's oil wells. Worried that Frank might discover that the three bosses used investors' money to play the stock market, Carlton commits suicide. Scheming to claim the $100,000 life insurance payout, Richards and Burns hire Tony Maroc and his gang to position Carlton's body in Frank's apartment to make it appear as if Carlton was murdered. Frank is arrested, tried and found guilty of murder.

While being moved to the penitentiary to await execution, Frank escapes. He goes to Burns' apartment and threatens Burns and Richards with a gun. Frank's brother Reverend Curtis appears, and together they flee the police and hide at the headquarters of the Sparks gang, a boxing gym. When the police arrive, Curtis poses as a boxer and knocks out defeats the champion, Roundhouse. With his jaw now broken, Roundhouse cannot compete in the upcoming match, so Sparks tells Curtis to take Roundhouse's place. If Curtis loses, Sparks will surrender Frank to the police, but if he wins, Sparks will pay Curtis $500. Curtis trains for the fight, but Tony, worried that Curtis will win, has his girlfriend pursue Curtis, hoping to distract him, but she is unsuccessful.

Tony learns that Curtis, who is wanted for aiding a criminal, is Frank's brother and has him arrested. Sparks wants to prove Frank innocent so that Curtis will be set free. Sparks, his gang and Frank investigate at Frank's old apartment and discover that Carlton could not have been shot there. Insurance investigators find proof that Smokey, one of Tony's henchmen, had been at the apartment. Sparks and two of his men interrogate Smokey until he confesses.

Richards and Burns discover a dictation machine recording in which Carlton confesses his guilt and suicide. Richards destroys the recording just before the police arrive to arrest the men for Carlton's murder. Richards argues that Carlton committed suicide, but he is now unable to prove it.

== Cast ==
- Edward J. Nugent as Frank Powell
- Kay Hughes as Marjorie Norton
- Lloyd Hughes as Curtis Powell
- John Wray as Sparks
- Edwin Maxwell as Richards
- Theodore von Eltz as Burns
- Thomas E. Jackson as Detective Ryan
- William Newell as Gabby
- Smiley Burnette as Hillbilly
- Christine Maple as Helen Vincent
- John Hamilton as Mr. Carlton
- Ralf Harolde as Tony Maroc
- Grace Durkin as Gertrude
- Carleton Young as Henchman Smokey
- Mary Bovard as Apartment House Tenant

== Reception ==
In a contemporary review for the New York Daily News, critic Wanda Hale called A Man Betrayed "a humorous, if not too convincing, piece of entertainment" and wrote: "[W]e've become so little calloused to plots wherein an innocent man or woman suffers through trial, conviction up to the inevitable last-minute reprieve. Republic's 'A Man Betrayed' gives so little of that harrowing stuff and so much of the brighter side of the case that we found ourselves liking it despite the fact that this case might not have been taken from the records."

== Bibliography ==
- Fetrow, Alan G. . Sound films, 1927-1939: a United States Filmography. McFarland, 1992.
