= Thieves' Clothes =

1920 film

- Directed by: Mack V. Wright
- Written by: Arthur Henry Gooden; Hope Loring
- Starring: Hoot Gibson
- Release date: May 22, 1920
- Running time: 20 minutes
- Country: United States
- Languages: Silent; English intertitles

Thieves' Clothes is a 1920 American short silent Western film directed by Mack V. Wright and featuring Hoot Gibson.

== Plot ==
This plot summary comes from the original Library of Congress filing for the copyright:

Billy Gage, cowpuncher, as the result of an argument with the foreman of the Lazy Y, is searching for a job. On his way to the Circle A ranch he stops over for the night in Cactus Flats. The morning stage into Cactus Flats brings as a passenger Jane Darling, returning from school to her home, the Circle A. She hires a flivver and starts across the hills for home. Awakening after his night's sleep, Billy lights his morning cigarette, but dozes off and drops it. The burning cigarette falls on his trousers and a miniature conflagration results. Billy finds his trousers a total loss, and bribes the Indian porter of the hotel to procure a new pair for him. The Indian pockets the money and steals the trousers of a guest in an adjoining room. Billy takes them and leaves. On the way to the ranch Jane's car fails her. Billy overtakes her and tows her in with his pony. A storm overtakes them, and they take refuge in a dobe cabin. A note falls from the pocket of Billy's trousers and is found by Jane. It incriminates Billy as a horse thief. Jane, believing Billy a member of the gang of horse thieves, makes her escape. The band of thieves come to the cabin to meet the man who is to buy the horses from them. Billy pretends to be the man, but is discovered, and the thieves make him a prisoner. Billy, by a clever subterfuge, gets away from them, makes them his captives, and recovers the stolen horses, as Jane rides in with her father and the men from the ranch. She accuses Billy as being one of the men of the gang, but the man whose trousers Billy wears appears on the scene, and Billy forces him to confess that it is his trousers that Billy wears and from which the note fell. Billy is exonerated, and wins a happy reward from the rancher and the prospect of the hand of Jane.

— Arthur Henry Gooden, story, Hope Loring, scenario

== Cast ==
- Hoot Gibson as Billy Gage
- Alma Bennett as Jane Darling

== See also ==
- Hoot Gibson filmography
