= Range Defenders =

1937 film by Mack V. Wright

- Theatrical release poster
- Directed by: Mack V. Wright
- Written by: Joseph F. Poland
- Produced by: Sol C. Siegel
- Starring: See below
- Cinematography: Jack A. Marta
- Edited by: Lester Orlebeck
- Music by: Fleming Allen
- Distributed by: Republic Pictures
- Release date: June 30, 1937
- Running time: 56 minutes
- Country: United States
- Language: English

Range Defenders is a 1937 American Western "Three Mesquiteers" B-movie directed by Mack V. Wright.

== Plot ==
Set in modern times, Stony Brooke's kid brother George rides into town saying that he is wanted for murder, a charge he denies. Stony, Tucson and Alibi ride to his brother's town to see that the Brooke family cattle ranch is up for sale due to George being already found guilty of murder. They discover the town is run by a group of sheepmen who wear uniforms. The Mesquiteers decide to run Tucson as a candidate in the election for sheriff to guarantee a fair trial for George. The corrupt sheepmen try to deny the cattlemen the right to vote, but the Mesquiteers bring everyone to justice using blazing six-guns, dynamite and ventriloquism.

The town hall has a sign announcing that Gun Lords of Stirrup Basin and Guns in the Dark are playing as a double feature.

== Cast ==
- Robert Livingston as Stony Brooke
- Ray Corrigan as Tucson Smith
- Max Terhune as Lullaby Joslin
- Eleanor Stewart as Sylvia Ashton
- Harry Woods as John Harvey
- Earle Hodgins as Sheriff Dan Gray
- Thomas Carr as George Brooke
- Yakima Canutt as Henchman
- John Merton as Henchman Craig
- Harrison Greene as Auctioneer
- Horace B. Carpenter as Pete
- Frank Ellis as Henchman
- Fred 'Snowflake' Toones as Cook
