= Ride Ranger Ride =

1936 film by Joseph Kane, Nat Levine

- Theatrical release poster
- Directed by: Joseph Kane
- Screenplay by: Dorrell McGowan; Stuart E. McGowan
- Story by: Bernard McConville; Karen DeWolf
- Produced by: Nat Levine
- Starring: Gene Autry; Smiley Burnette; Kay Hughes
- Cinematography: William Nobles
- Edited by: Lester Orlebeck
- Music by: Harry Grey (supervisor)
- Production company: Republic Pictures
- Distributed by: Republic Pictures
- Release date: September 30, 1936 (U.S.)
- Running time: 54 minutes
- Country: United States
- Language: English

Ride Ranger Ride is a 1936 American Western film directed by Joseph Kane and starring Gene Autry, Smiley Burnette, and Kay Hughes. Based on a story by Bernard McConville and Karen DeWolf, and a screenplay by Dorrell and Stuart E. McGowan, the film is about a Texas Ranger working undercover to protect an Army wagon train full of ammunition and supplies. The Army doesn't believe him at first, until the Comanche arrive.

== Plot ==
Following the American Civil War the Texas Rangers are disbanded with Texas Ranger Lieutenant Gene Autry (Gene Autry) accepts a commission into the US Army Cavalry who will now police Texas. His men follow him forming a troop. The American Federal Government now wants to make friends with the hostile Comanche, blaming the hot headed Rangers and all other Texans for inciting the Indians.

The men adapt with Autry and cavalry Lieutenant Bob Cameron (George J. Lewis) competing for the attentions of Dixie Summerall (Kay Hughes), the beautiful daughter of Colonel Summerall (Robert Homans) the post commander at Fort Adobe, Texas. Their romantic aspirations are cut short when an Indian party wish to have a talk with the cavalry but wearing war paint is spotted by Autry and his scout Rufe. Though Autry and Rufe prevent an Indian attack by opening fire on the small party of Indians when they attempt to signal a larger party to attack, the larger party escapes without being seen. Autry is demoted to trooper and Rufe loses one month's Army Scout pay. A peace treaty is signed with the help of Duval (Monte Blue), the fort's interpreter.

Gene and his buddies, Frog Millhouse (Smiley Burnette) and Rufe Jones (Max Terhune), suspect that Duval is working with the Indians, and they go to his canteen to investigate. Confronted by the Texas Ranger, Duval tries to kill Gene and a barroom brawl ensues. Afterwards, Gene and his friends are court-martialed for their involvement in the fight. When Gene tries to warn Colonel Summerall and about the interpreter's involvement with the Indians, he is arrested for the murder of a Comanche brave.

Known to the Indians as Chief Tavibo, Duval is now free to continue his plot to re-route a supply train so that the Comanches can attack and capture the cavalry's ammunition. After Gene escapes jail, he travels to meet the Governor of Texas and former Ranger Major Crosby. The Governor reinstates the Texas Rangers to protect the population. Autry joins the bloody battle between the cavalry and the Comanches. Soon Frog arrives with the Texas Rangers to win the battle, during which Duval is killed and his true identity is revealed. After peace is restored, Colonel Summerall apologizes to Gene, and Gene wins Dixie as his bride.

== Cast ==
- Gene Autry as Texas Ranger Gene Autry
- Smiley Burnette as Frog Millhouse
- Kay Hughes as Dixie Summerall
- Monte Blue as Duval, aka Chief Tavibo
- George J. Lewis as Lieutenant Bob Cameron
- Max Terhune as Rufe Jones
- Robert Homans as Colonel Summerall
- Lloyd Whitlock as Major Crosby
- Chief Thundercloud as Little Wolf
- The Tennessee Ramblers as Ranger Musicians (Note: The Tennessee Ramblers consist of W.J. Blair, Dick Hartman, Happy Morris, Elmer Warren, and Pappy Wolf.)
- Jack Cheatham as Jailer (uncredited)
- Iron Eyes Cody as Comanche War Party Leader (uncredited)
- Nelson McDowell as Proctor (uncredited)
- Greg Whitespear as Crazy Crow (uncredited)
- Champion as Champ, Gene's Horse (uncredited)
- Joan Barclay as Wagon Trail Girl (uncredited)

== Production ==
=== Stuntwork ===
- Joe Yrigoyen

=== Soundtrack ===
- "Ride Ranger Ride" (Tim Spencer) by Gene Autry and The Tennessee Ramblers
- "On the Sunset Trail" (Sam H. Stept, Sidney D. Mitchell) by Gene Autry and The Tennessee Ramblers
- "La Cucaracha" played in the canteen
- "Song of the Pioneers" (Tim Spencer) by riders with the wagon train

== Memorable quotes ==
- Rufe Jones: Lieutenant, when you see Indians be careful—and when you don't see Indians, be more careful.
- Texas Ranger Gene Autry: I think you're walking into a trap.

Lt. Bob Cameron: That's my responsibility, Autry.
Rufe Jones: Sure, but we're with you!

- Texas Ranger Gene Autry: Goodbye, Colonel, and remember this—make your peace signals with one hand, and keep your rifles ready in the other.
- Texas Ranger Gene Autry: Just saddle our horses and trot 'em by in front of the guard house.

Frog Millhouse: Horses?
Rufe Jones: Yeah, horses. You know, the things you fall off of.
