= The Mandarin Mystery =

1936 film by Ralph Staub

- Directed by: Ralph Staub
- Written by: Frederic Dannay (story); John Francis Larkin (writer); Manfred Lee (story); Gertrude Orr (writer); Rex Taylor (writer)
- Screenplay by: Cortland Fitzsimmons
- Produced by: Nat Levine (producer); Victor Zobel (associate producer)
- Starring: See below
- Cinematography: Jack A. Marta
- Edited by: Grace Goddard
- Distributed by: Republic Pictures
- Release date: December 23, 1936
- Running time: 66 minutes (USA); 53 minutes (USA, edited version)
- Country: United States
- Language: English

The Mandarin Mystery

The Mandarin Mystery is a 1936 American mystery crime film directed by Ralph Staub, loosely based on The Chinese Orange Mystery, a novel featuring detective character Ellery Queen.

== Plot summary ==
Two murders are committed and a $50,000 Chinese Mandarin stamp is stolen, tossed around and eventually recovered as an aggregation of costly-stamp counterfeiters are uncovered through the mastermind investigation by Ellery Queen.

== Cast ==
- Eddie Quillan as Ellery Queen, a mystery writer and amateur detective
- Charlotte Henry as Josephine Temple
- Rita La Roy as Martha Kirk
- Wade Boteler as Inspector Richard Queen, A police inspector, Ellery's father.
- Franklin Pangborn as Mellish, the hotel manager
- George Irving as Dr. Alexander Kirk
- Kay Hughes as Irene Kirk
- William Newell as Detective Guffy
- George Walcott as Donald Trent
- Edwin Stanley as Howard Bronson
- Edgar Allen as Detective
- Bert Roach
- Richard Beach as Reporter
- Monte Vandergrift as Detective
- Grace Durkin as Girl on Street Corner
- Mary Russell as Girl on Street Corner
- Mary Bovard as Girl At Cocktail Bar
- June Johnson as Girl At Cocktail Bar
