= Merle Armitage =

American author and book designer

- Born: 1893; Iowa, U.S.
- Died: March 15, 1975 (aged 81–82); Yucca Valley, California, U.S.
- Occupations: tour manager, set designer, opera producer, art collector, author, book designer
- Children: 1

Merle Armitage (1893 - March 15, 1975) was an American set designer, tour manager, theater producer, opera producer, art collector, author, and book designer.

== Biography ==
Armitage was born in 1893 in Iowa.

Armitage became a theater set designer in New York City. He was the tour manager for the Scotti Grand Opera Company, the Russian Grand Opera Company, and The Beggars Opera. He co-founded the Los Angeles Grand Opera Association in 1924, and he was its manager until 1930. He managed the Los Angeles Philharmonic Auditorium, from 1933 to 1939. From 1933 to 1934 he was director of the Public Works of Art Project's Region 14, California south of Paso Robles.

Armitage was the editorial and art director of Look magazine, and he was the president of the American Institute of Graphic Arts in 1951. He designed and authored many books, including Saints and Saint Makers, Operatic Masterpieces, Operations Santa Fe, and Burro Alley. He authored two books about Igor Stravinsky and a book about George Gershwin, two men whose tours he managed.

Armitage was married four times, and he had a daughter, Chama. He died on March 15, 1975, in Yucca Valley, California, at age 82.

== Selected works ==
- Armitage, Merle (1958). George Gershwin: Man and Legend. New York: Duell, Sloan and Pearco. OCLC 642004144.
