= The Big Show (1936 film) =

1936 film by Joseph Kane, Mack V. Wright

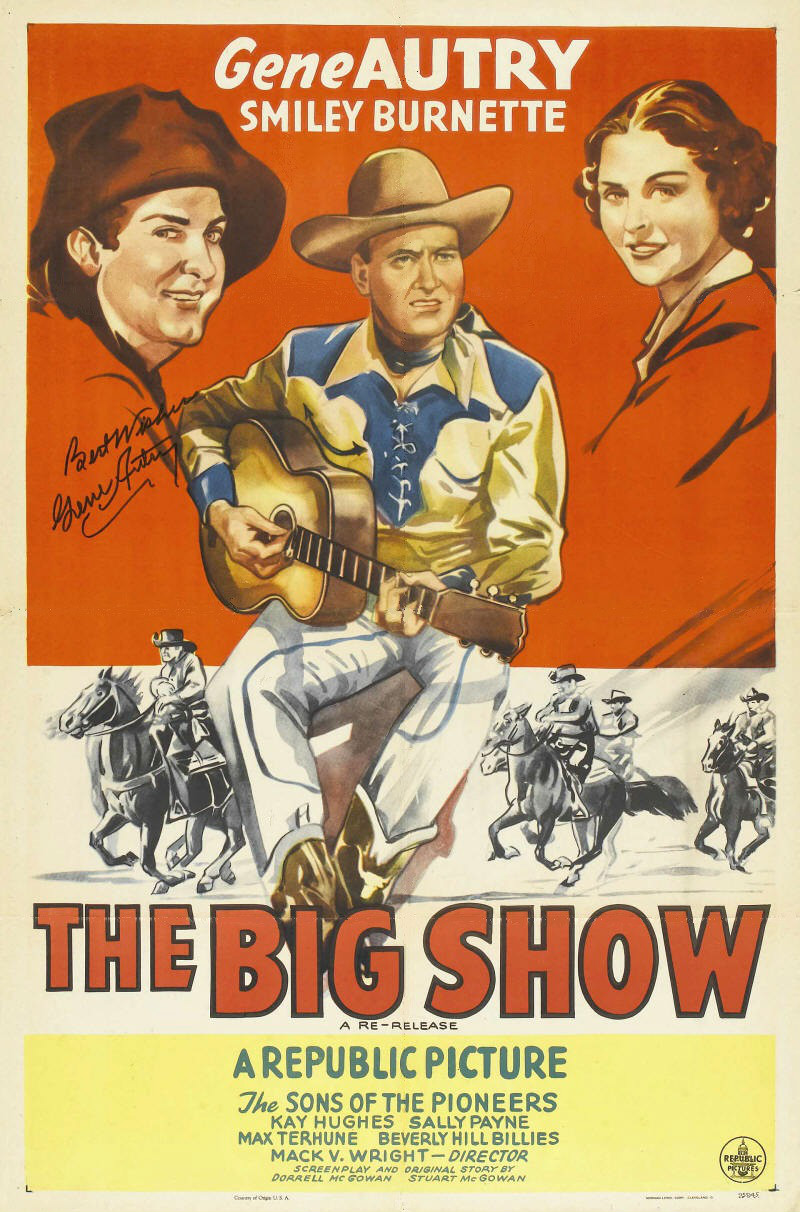
- Theatrical release poster
- Directed by: Mack V. Wright; Joseph Kane (uncredited)
- Written by: Dorrell McGowan; Stuart E. McGowan
- Produced by: Nat Levine
- Starring: Gene Autry; Smiley Burnette; Kay Hughes
- Cinematography: Edgar Lyons; William Nobles
- Edited by: Robert Jahns
- Production company: Republic Pictures
- Distributed by: Republic Pictures
- Release date: November 16, 1936 (USA)
- Running time: 54 minutes
- Country: United States
- Language: English

The Big Show is a 1936 American Western musical film directed by Mack V. Wright and starring Gene Autry, Kay Hughes, and Smiley Burnette. Written by Dorrell and Stuart E. McGowan, the film is about a singing cowboy who confuses two girls by being himself and his own stunt double at the Texas Centennial in Dallas. Roy Rogers appears in the film as one of the Sons of the Pioneers.

== Plot ==
Western movie star Tom Ford (Gene Autry) is scheduled to make a guest appearance at the Texas Centennial celebration in Dallas. When Ford leaves on vacation intending to miss the celebration, his publicity manager Lee Wilson (William Newell) convinces singing cowboy Gene Autry (Gene Autry) to appear in Tom's place. While driving to Dallas from Hollywood, Gene meets Marion Hill (Kay Hughes) when his trailer collides with her wagon. Marion is also on her way to the centennial, intending to enter her show steer in the Texas Centennial Exposition. Watching Gene skillfully retrieve her cattle, Marion is impressed to see a movie star perform like a true cowboy.

At the Texas Centennial in Dallas, Gene (pretending to be movie star Tom Ford) sings on the radio and becomes a national hit. Studio head Swartz (Charles Judels), hoping to capitalize on the publicity, decides to launch a series of Western musicals starring Tom Ford, even though the real Ford cannot sing a note. When the engagement of Gene (as Tom Ford) and Marion is announced in the newspapers, Ford's real fiancée is infuriated. Meanwhile, gambler Tony Rico (Harry Worth) and his henchmen arrive in Dallas to collect the $10,000 that Tom owes. Wilson is forced to pay the debt, plus $25,000 to keep Rico from revealing Gene's identity. Tom Ford finally shows up and reports to Swartz, but the studio head would rather appease the blackmailers than replace Gene with the talentless Ford.

At the "Cavalcade of Texas" Gene and Marion perform as part of the centennial. When Tom Ford's fiancée shows up, Marion is forced to leave. In order to save his romance with Marion, Gene takes a risk and confesses his true identity over the radio. To his surprise, the audience prefers him to the real Tom Ford. Gene's confession ruins Rico's blackmail attempt, and he and his henchmen escape with the blackmail money by dressing as cowboys and joining the cavalcade act. Gene chases after the outlaws in true western style, eventually arresting them. During the chase, the money is lost in a lagoon by Gene's sidekick, Frog (Smiley Burnette). Sometime later back in Hollywood, Tom Ford is now working as Gene's double. Gene sings to Marion on the set of his new movie, and she and Gene kiss.

== Cast ==
- Gene Autry as Gene Autry / Tom Ford
- Smiley Burnette as Frog
- Kay Hughes as Marion Hill
- Sally Payne as Toodles Brown
- William Newell as Lee Wilson
- Max Terhune as Ventriloquist
- Charles Judels as Swartz, the studio head
- Sons of the Pioneers as Musicians (Note: The Sons of the Pioneers are Bob Nolan (bass), Roy Rogers (guitar), Tim Spencer (vocals), Karl Farr (guitar), and Hugh Farr (violin).)
- The Jones Boys as Singers
- The Beverly Hill Billies as Musicians (Note: The Beverly Hill Billies Band are Elton Britt, Aleth Hansen, and Rudy Sooter.)
- Light Crust Doughboys as Musicians
- Champion as Champion, the studio horse
- Rex King as Fred Collins
- Harry J. Worth as Tony Rico
- Mary Russell as Mary
- Christine Maple as Miss Van Every, Ford's Fiancee
- Jerry Larkin as Henchman Blackie
- Jack O'Shea as Henchman Joe
- Wedgwood Nowell as Movie Director
- Antrim Short as Studio Assistant
- June Johnson as Studio Secretary
- Grace Durkin as Studio Girl

== Production ==
=== Filming locations ===
The movie was filmed at Fair Park in Dallas, Texas, which served as the location of the 1936 Texas Centennial Exposition; it continues to serve as the location of the Texas State Fair. Many of the buildings in the film still exist in what has been called the largest collection of art deco buildings in the world.

- Fair Park, Dallas, Texas, USA
- Iverson Ranch, 1 Iverson Lane, Chatsworth, Los Angeles, California, USA
- Texas State Fairgrounds, 3921 Martin Luther King Jr. Boulevard, Dallas, Texas, USA

=== Stuntwork ===
- Cliff Lyons
- Bill Yrigoyen
- Joe Yrigoyen

=== Soundtrack ===
- "The Martins and the Coys" (Ted Weems and Al Cameron) by Gene Autry, Smiley Burnette and The Beverly Hill Billies
- "Travelin' Along" by The Light Crust Dough Boys
- "Mad About You" (Sam H. Stept and Ted Koehler) by Gene Autry and Smiley Burnette
- "Oh! Susanna" (Stephen Foster) played at the Texas Centennial
- "Ride, Ranger, Ride" (Tim Spencer) by the marching Texas Rangers
- "Lady Known as Lulu" (Sam H. Stept and Ned Washington) by The Jones Boys
- "Wild and Wooly West" by Gene Autry, Smiley Burnette, Sally Payne, Sons of the Pioneers, and Max Terhune (through his dummy)
- "Nobody's Darlin' But Mine" (Jimmie Davis) by Gene Autry and Sons of the Pioneers
- "Roll, Wagons, Roll" (Tim Spencer and Carl Winge) by Sons of the Pioneers
- "Ole Faithful" (Michael Carr and Hamilton Kennedy) by Gene Autry

== See also ==
- List of films in the public domain in the United States
