= Ghost-Town Gold =

1936 film by Joseph Kane

- DVD cover
- Directed by: Joseph Kane; Supervised by William Berke
- Written by: Oliver Drake (screenplay); William Colt MacDonald (characters); Bernard McConville (story); John Rathmell (screenplay)
- Produced by: Nat Levine (producer); Sol C. Siegel (associate producer)
- Starring: See below
- Cinematography: Jack A. Marta; William Nobles
- Edited by: Lester Orlebeck
- Distributed by: Republic Pictures
- Release date: October 26, 1936
- Running time: 55 minutes
- Country: United States
- Language: English

Ghost-Town Gold is a 1936 American Western film directed by Joseph Kane and was the second entry of the 51-film series of Western "Three Mesquiteers" B-movies. It was based on the 1935 novel of the same name by William Colt MacDonald.

== Plot ==
Having earned a tidy sum from the sale of some cattle they drove, The Three Mesquiteers reluctantly send the gambling addict Lullaby Joslin to bank their cheque from the sale. Lullaby wins Elmer, a ventriloquist dummy at a crooked carnival by cheating at a game of Three Card Monte, replacing all his cards with Aces. Lullaby and Elmer are on a roll and arrive at the bank just after it closes.

During the night the bank is robbed, the Three Mesquiteers stay on to help the bank, including Tucson Smith taking the place of a champion in a prize fight, and apprehend the robbers who hid the money in a ghost town.

== Cast ==
- Robert Livingston as Stony Brooke
- Ray Corrigan as Tucson Smith
- Max Terhune as Lullaby Joslin
- Kay Hughes as Sabina Thornton
- LeRoy Mason as Dirk Barrington
- Burr Caruth as Mayor Ben Thornton
- Bob Kortman as Monk (Barrington's Henchman)
- Milburn Morante as Jake Rawlins
- Frank Hagney as 'Wild Man' Joe Kamatski
- Don Roberts as O'Brien's manager
- F. Herrick Herrick as Catlett, the Fight Promoter
- Robert C. Thomas as 'Thunderbolt' O'Brien, the Champ
- Yakima Canutt as Buck (Barrington's Henchman)
- Hank Worden as Mr. Crabtree
