= Richard Alexander (actor) =

American character actor (1902–1989)

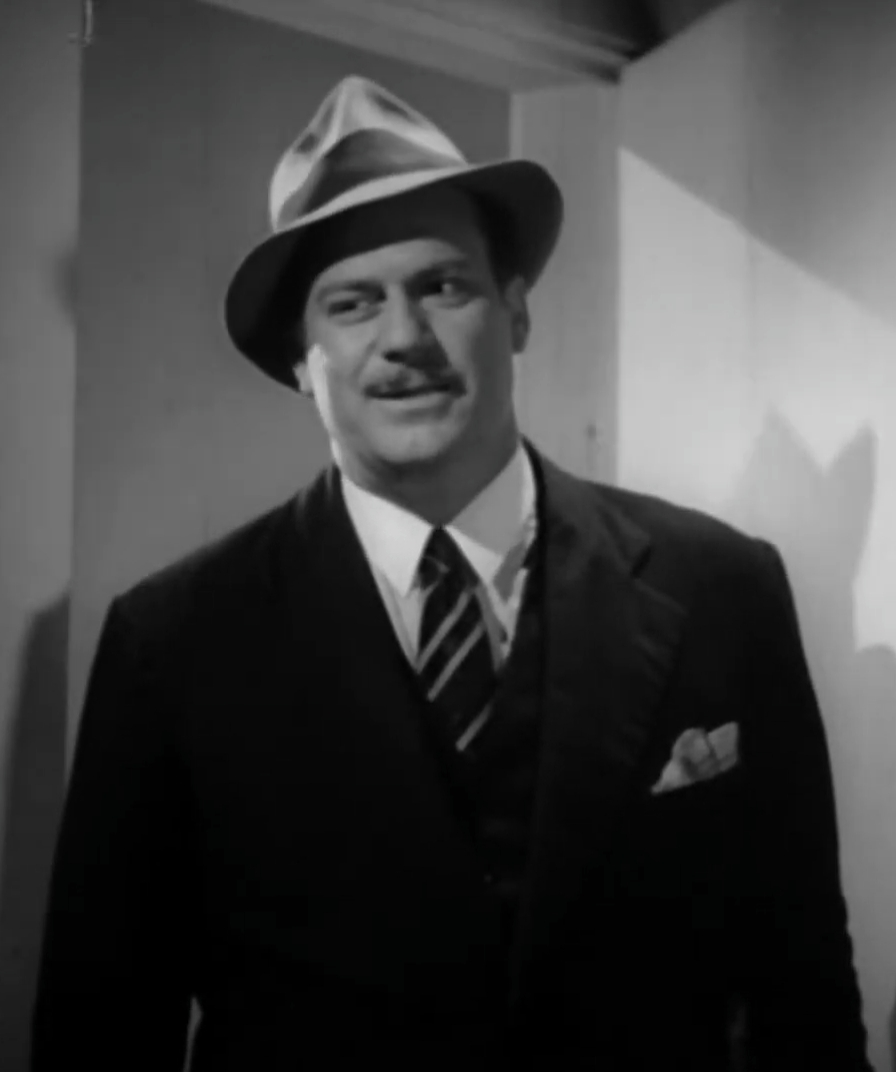
- Alexander in Reefer Madness (1936)
- Born: November 19, 1902; Dallas, Texas, U.S.
- Died: August 9, 1989 (aged 86); Woodland Hills, Los Angeles, California, U.S.
- Resting place: Forest Lawn Memorial Park, Glendale, California
- Occupation: Actor
- Years active: 1921–1970

Richard Alexander (November 19, 1902 – August 9, 1989) was an American film character actor.

== Biography ==
Born in Dallas, Texas, Alexander appeared in numerous film serials such as Flash Gordon, Zorro Rides Again and films like Babes in Toyland, The Gladiator, as well as a leading role in All Quiet on the Western Front. Although he appeared in countless films, almost all of his appearances were uncredited (see filmography below).

Alexander died at age 86 in Woodland Hills, Los Angeles, California. He is buried in Forest Lawn Memorial Park, Glendale, California.

== Filmography ==
- Brown of Harvard (1926) as Football Fan (film debut, uncredited)
- Old Ironsides (1926) as Seaman (uncredited)
- The Fightin' Comeback (1927) as Red Pollock
- The King of Kings (1927) as Roman Soldier (uncredited)
- Annie Laurie (1927) as One of the MacDonalds (uncredited)
- The Leopard Lady (1928) as Hector - Lion Tamer
- Marlie the Killer (1928) as Sam McKee
- Virgin Lips (1928) as Carta
- The Mysterious Lady (1928) as General's Aide
- The Godless Girl (1928) as Prison Guard
- The Cameraman (1928) as The Big Sea Lion (uncredited)
- The Docks of New York (1928) as Lou's Sweetheart (uncredited)
- The Viking (1928) as Sigurd
- The Bride of the Colorado (1928) as Dirk
- Sin Sister (1929) - Bob Newton as Trader
- Tide of Empire (1929) as Gold Miner with Whip (uncredited)
- Rio Rita (1929) as Gonzales (uncredited)
- The Lone Star Ranger (1930) as Henchman
- City Girl (1930) as Mac
- Redemption (1930) as Policeman
- All Quiet on the Western Front (1930) as Westhus
- Rough Waters (1930) as Little
- See America Thirst (1930) as McGann's Henchman
- Are You There? (1930) as International Crook
- The Sunrise Trail (1931) as Henchman (uncredited)
- Dirigible (1931) as Radio Operator (uncredited)
- The Front Page (1931) as Jacobi (uncredited)
- A Connecticut Yankee (1931) as Sagramor's Knight (uncredited)
- Young Donovan's Kid (1931) as Ben Murray
- Too Many Cooks (1931) as Minor Role (uncredited)
- Shanghaied Love (1931) as Eric
- The Hurricane Horseman (1931) as Bull Carter - Henchman
- Suicide Fleet (1931) as Crew Member (uncredited)
- A House Divided (1931) as Sailor (uncredited)
- The Law of the Tong (1931) as Davy Jones
- The Sunset Trail (1932) as One-Shot
- One Man Law (1932) as Sorenson
- Law and Order (1932) as Kurt Northrup
- Love Bound (1932) as Larry, the Randolph Chauffeur, posing as J. B. 'Lucky' Morrison
- Two-Fisted Law (1932) as Zeke Yokum - Henchman
- Heroes of the West (1932) as Frontiersman at Beginning of Each Episode (uncredited)
- Daring Danger (1932) as Bull Bagley
- The Texas Bad Man (1932) as Gene - Texas Ranger (uncredited)
- Skyscraper Souls (1932) as Man Tom Bumps Into (uncredited)
- Flaming Gold (1932) as Truck Driver in Cantina (uncredited)
- Scarlet Dawn (1932) as Pyotyr (uncredited)
- The Sign of the Cross (1932) as Viturius
- Sundown Rider (1932) as Posse Leader (uncredited)
- Laughter in Hell (1933) as Construction Boss (uncredited)
- Below the Sea (1933) as Sailor (uncredited)
- Destination Unknown (1933) as Alex
- Diplomaniacs (1933) as Bouncer (uncredited)
- Roman Scandals (1933) as Valerius' Soldier (uncredited)
- Queen Christina (1933) as Peasant in Crowd (uncredited)
- The Fighting Code (1933) as Sheriff Olson
- Sixteen Fathoms Deep (1934) as Martin, Burly Crewman
- George White's Scandals (1934) as Iceman
- Voice in the Night (1934) as Lineman Restraining Jackson (uncredited)
- The Scarlet Empress (1934) - Count von Breummer (uncredited)
- The Law of the Wild (1934, Serial) as Lewis R. Lou Salters [Ch. 1]
- Cleopatra (1934) as General Philodemas
- We Live Again (1934) as Warden (uncredited)
- Kentucky Kernels (1934) as Hank Wakefield
- Babes in Toyland (1934) as King's Guard (uncredited)
- Cowboy Holiday (1934) as Deputy Walt Gregor
- Unconquered Bandit (1935) as Night Hawk Henchman Pat
- Romance in Manhattan (1935) as Man at East River (uncredited)
- Coyote Trails (1935) as Mack Larkin
- Rumba (1935) as Cop (uncredited)
- Born to Battle (1935) as Nate
- The Cowboy and the Bandit (1935) as Scarface Jennings
- The Miracle Rider (1935) as Buffalo Hunter [Ch. 1] (uncredited)
- Fighting Shadows (1935) as Bull Maddigan (uncredited)
- Men of the Hour (1935) as Police Lieutenant (uncredited)
- Riding Wild (1935) as Henchman Ed Barker
- She Gets Her Man (1935) as Barton - A Gangster (uncredited)
- The Crusades (1935) as Crusading Warrior (uncredited)
- The Big Broadcast of 1936 (1935) as Salvo (uncredited)
- Freckles (1935) as Butch
- Annie Oakley (1935) as Crown Prince Wilhelm (uncredited)
- The Fighting Marines (1935, Serial) as Ivan as Henchman [Chs. 1–4, 7-9]
- A Tale of Two Cities (1935) as Executioner (uncredited)
- Roarin' Guns (1936) as Bull Langdon
- Modern Times (1936) as The Prison Cellmate
- Dangerous Waters (1936) as Hays
- Drift Fence (1936) as Henchman Seth Haverly
- Follow the Fleet (1936) as Paradise Ballroom Waiter (uncredited)
- The Story of Louis Pasteur (1936) as Burly Farmer (uncredited)
- Silly Billies (1936) as John Little
- Flash Gordon (1936, Serial) as Prince Barin [Chs. 5-13]
- The Clutching Hand (1936, Serial) as First Mate Olaf [Chs.11-12,14] (uncredited)
- Everyman's Law (1936) as Barber
- Bengal Tiger (1936) as Strong Man (uncredited)
- Wild Brian Kent (1936) as Phil Hansen
- The Plainsman (1936) as Lattimer's Third Teamster (uncredited)
- Love on the Run (1936) as Wilhelm - Baron's Henchman (uncredited)
- Reefer Madness (1936) as Pete Daley - Dope Pusher (uncredited)
- Jungle Jim (1937, Serial) as Seaman Crying Man Overboard (chapter one) (uncredited)
- Outcast (1937) as Lyncher (uncredited)
- Feud of the Trail (1937) as Holcomb Brother
- Mystery Range (1937) as Luke Bardos
- Two-Fisted Sheriff (1937) as Bull - Henchman (uncredited)
- Flying Fists (1937) as Fritz (uncredited)
- The Toast of New York (1937) as Stabbed Actor in Play (uncredited)
- Think Fast, Mr. Moto (1937) as Ivan - Doorman (uncredited)
- The Big Shot (1937) as Gate Guard (uncredited)
- SOS Coast Guard (1937) as Thorg
- Zorro Rides Again (1937, Serial) as Brad Dace - aka El Lobo
- Outlaws of the Prairie (1937) as Rufe Lupton (uncredited)
- The Buccaneer (1938) as Pirate (uncredited)
- Where the West Begins (1938) as Barnes
- Flash Gordon's Trip to Mars (1938, Serial) as Prince Barin [Chs. 6-15]
- The Adventures of Marco Polo (1938) as Ahmed's Aide (uncredited)
- Joy of Living (1938) as Angry Man in Revolving Door (uncredited)
- Six Shootin' Sheriff (1938) as Big Boy - Bar X Rider
- Marie Antoinette (1938) as Man with Pike (uncredited)
- On the Great White Trail (1938) as Doc Howe
- The Gladiator (1938) as Tough Guy (uncredited)
- Keep Smiling (1938) as Pete, Grip (uncredited)
- The Mysterious Rider (1938) as Big Tom Hudson (uncredited)
- Where the Buffalo Roam (1938) as Sellers
- The Storm (1938) as Sailor/Brawler (uncredited)
- Santa Fe Stampede (1938) as Henchman Joe Moffit (uncredited)
- Charlie Chan in Honolulu (1938) as Crewman (uncredited)
- Disbarred (1939) as Counterman (uncredited)
- Flying G-Men (1939, Serial) as Sam Blaine (uncredited)
- Union Pacific (1939) as Card Player (uncredited)
- Chasing Danger (1939) as Warrior (uncredited)
- They Asked for It (1939) as Mollens (uncredited)
- Captain Fury (1939) as Guard
- Frontier Marshal (1939) as Curly Bill's Henchman (uncredited)
- The Kansas Terrors (1939) as Nico
- Tower of London (1939) as 2nd Gate Guard Greeting Tom Clink (uncredited)
- Destry Rides Again (1939) as Cowboy (uncredited)
- Death Rides the Range (1939) as Big Nick Harden (uncredited)
- Boss of Bullion City (1940) as Steve Hogan
- Strange Cargo (1940) as Guard (uncredited)
- Dark Command (1940) as Phil - Guerrilla Guarding Seton (uncredited)
- Covered Wagon Days (1940) as Border Guard (uncredited)
- Son of Roaring Dan (1940) as Big Taylor
- Wyoming (1940) as Gus - Henchman (uncredited)
- Rangers of Fortune (1940) as Water Thug (uncredited)
- The Great Dictator (1940) as Tomainian Prison Guard in 1918 (uncredited)
- The Lady from Cheyenne (1941) as Henchman (uncredited)
- In the Navy (1941) as Big Bruiser (uncredited)
- Broadway Limited (1941) as Would-Be Kidnapper (uncredited)
- Riders of Death Valley (1941, Serial) as Henchman Pete Grump
- Wild Geese Calling (1941) as Alaskan (uncredited)
- The Iron Claw (1941, Serial) as Henchman (uncredited)
- Man from Montana (1941) as Henchman Kohler
- Badlands of Dakota (1941) as Poker Player Who Challenges Jim (uncredited)
- Burma Convoy (1941) as Truck Driver in Bar (uncredited)
- Never Give a Sucker an Even Break (1941) as Burly Man (uncredited)
- Sea Raiders (1941, Serial) as Jenkins
- Double Trouble (1941) as Seaman
- The Corsican Brothers (1941) as Castle Guard (uncredited)
- Paris Calling (1941) as German Guard (uncredited)
- Code of the Outlaw (1942) as Horse Buyer (uncredited)
- The Ghost of Frankenstein (1942) as Villager (uncredited)
- Reap the Wild Wind (1942) as Stoker Boss (uncredited)
- Raiders of the Range (1942) as Bull - Saloon Brawler (uncredited)
- Romance on the Range (1942) as Henchman (uncredited)
- In Old California (1942) as Clem - Dawson's Henchman (uncredited)
- Lady in a Jam (1942) as Fighter - Long White Beard (uncredited)
- Hangmen Also Die! (1943) as Slugger in Theater (uncredited)
- King of the Cowboys (1943) as Joe - Prop Man (uncredited)
- Du Barry Was a Lady (1943) as Marching Rebel Behind King Louis (uncredited)
- The Return of the Rangers (1943) as Henchman Sam Kane (uncredited)
- The Chance of a Lifetime (1943) as Carpet Man (uncredited)
- Is Everybody Happy? (1943) as Audience Member Punching Jerry (uncredited)
- Klondike Kate (1943) as Bill (uncredited)
- Ali Baba and the Forty Thieves (1944) as Mongol Guard (uncredited)
- Raiders of the Border (1944) as Steve Rollins - Henchman
- Oklahoma Raiders (1944) as Henchman Duggan
- Call of the South Seas (1944) as Bailey
- Boss of Boomtown (1944) as The Yuma Kid
- Spook Town (1944) as Henchman
- Man from Frisco (1944) as Workman (uncredited)
- Trigger Trail (1944) as Henchman Waco
- Raiders of Ghost City (1944, Serial) as Henchman (uncredited)
- Three Little Sisters (1944) as Charlie Nichols (uncredited)
- Gunsmoke Mesa (1944) as Henchman Lear
- Storm Over Lisbon (1944) as Doorman (uncredited)
- Riders of the Santa Fe (1944) as Biff McCauley - Henchman
- Lost in a Harem (1944) as Executioner (uncredited)
- The Princess and the Pirate (1944) as Holdup Thug (uncredited)
- Can't Help Singing (1944) as Pioneer (uncredited)
- I Was a Criminal (1945) as 1st Passport Official
- His Brother's Ghost (1945) as Henchman (uncredited)
- The House of Fear (1945) as Ralph King (uncredited)
- Salome, Where She Danced (1945) as Shotgun (uncredited)
- The Master Key (1945, Serial) as Flamingo Club Bouncer (uncredited)
- Renegades of the Rio Grande (1945) as Pete Jackson - Henchman
- Boston Blackie's Rendezvous (1945) as 1st Bruiser (uncredited)
- Riders of the Dawn (1945) as Thorpe - Blacksmith (uncredited)
- Abbott and Costello in Hollywood (1945) as Eddie (uncredited)
- Senorita from the West (1945) as Masseur (uncredited)
- Flaming Bullets (1945) as Dick (uncredited)
- The Royal Mounted Rides Again (1945, Serial) as Blackie LaRock (uncredited)
- The Daltons Ride Again (1945) as Henchman (uncredited)
- The Fighting Guardsman (1946) as Bearded Man (uncredited)
- Night in Paradise (1946) as Temple Guard (uncredited)
- Canyon Passage (1946) as Miner (uncredited)
- Spook Busters (1946) as Ivan
- Neath Canadian Skies (1946) as Pete Davis
- North of the Border (1946) as Tiny Muller
- Song of Scheherazade (1947) as Theater Attendant (uncredited)
- Northwest Outpost (1947) as Large Convict (uncredited)
- The Marauders (1947) as Henchman Smitty (uncredited)
- Jesse James Rides Again (1947, Serial) as Clem (uncredited)
- Heaven Only Knows (1947) as One of Byron's Gunmen (uncredited)
- Unconquered (1947) as Slave (uncredited)
- The Wild Frontier (1947) as Bartender (uncredited)
- Louisiana (1947) as Blacksmith
- Arch of Triumph (1948) as Gestapo Agent (uncredited)
- Silent Conflict (1948) as 1st. Rancher
- The Dead Don't Dream (1948) as Duke - Handyman
- Silver River (1948) as Sweeney Henchman (uncredited)
- A Southern Yankee (1948) as Bartender (uncredited)
- Two Guys from Texas (1948) as Dick (uncredited)
- False Paradise (1948) as Sam - Henchman
- Joan of Arc (1948) as Man on Boulevard (uncredited)
- Loaded Pistols (1948) as Big Balding Man at Dance (uncredited)
- The Life of Riley (1949) as Cheerful Finance Company Bouncer (uncredited)
- Rimfire (1949) as Karl Weber
- Big Jack (1949) as Bandit (uncredited)
- Canadian Pacific (1949) as Railroad Worker (uncredited)
- Hellfire (1949) as Blacksmith (uncredited)
- Lust for Gold (1949) as Townsman (uncredited)
- The Fighting Kentuckian (1949) s Militiaman (uncredited)
- Copper Canyon (1950) as Excited Townsman (uncredited)
- Cargo to Capetown (1950) as Deck Crewman (uncredited)
- Rock Island Trail (1950) as Morrow's Henchman (uncredited)
- Father of the Bride (1950) as Moving Man with Screen (uncredited)
- Across the Badlands (1950) as Burly Tough Guy
- One Too Many (1950) as Truck Driver Drinking Coca-Cola in Bar
- Inside Straight (1951) as Asst. Foreman (uncredited)
- The Scarf (1951) as Barfly (uncredited)
- Silver Canyon (1951) as Henchman Luke Anders
- Cyclone Fury (1951) as Henchman in Johnny's Hotel Room (uncredited)
- Meet Danny Wilson (1952) as Nightclub Patron (uncredited)
- Night Stage to Galveston (1952) as Patrol Headquarters Leader (uncredited)
- Montana Territory (1952) as Buzzard (uncredited)
- I Dream of Jeanie (1952) as Cop (uncredited)
- Woman of the North Country (1952) as Townsman (uncredited)
- Woman They Almost Lynched (1953) as Townsman (uncredited)
- A Perilous Journey (1953) as Crying Miner (uncredited)
- South Sea Woman (1953) as Bouncer at Krastner's (uncredited)
- Dangerous When Wet (1953) as Egyptian Channel swimmer
- Pack Train (1953) as Bartender-Charlie (uncredited)
- The Band Wagon (1953) as Stagehand (uncredited)
- The Mississippi Gambler (1953) as Townsman (uncredited)
- Those Redheads from Seattle (1953) as Barfly (uncredited)
- So Big (1953) as Bidder (uncredited)
- Trader Tom of the China Seas (1954) as Gorth (uncredited)
- The Long, Long Trailer (1954) as Bald Shopper in Bungalette Trailer (uncredited)
- Broken Lance (1954) as Extra Outside Courtroom (uncredited)
- The Bounty Hunter (1954) as Gambler (uncredited)
- Timberjack (1955) as Barfly (uncredited)
- The Road to Denver (1955) as Bartender #2 (uncredited)
- King of the Carnival (1955, Serial) as Tent Worker 2 (uncredited)
- The Spoilers (1955) as Miner (uncredited)
- Flesh and the Spur (1956) as Bartender (uncredited)
- Hollywood or Bust (1956) as Western Actor (uncredited)
- The Buster Keaton Story (1957) as Tough Guy (uncredited)
- The Night the World Exploded (1957) as Workman (uncredited)
- Les Girls (1957) as Stagehand (uncredited)
- Day of the Badman (1958) as Townsman (uncredited)
- Cole Younger, Gunfighter (1958) as Barfly (uncredited)
- The Sheepman (1958) as Barfly (uncredited)
- Buchanan Rides Alone (1958) as Barfly (uncredited)
- The Big Country (1958) as Party Guest (uncredited)
- The Last Hurrah (1958) as Mourner Given Cigar at Wake (uncredited)
- Alias Jesse James (1959) as Jeremiah Cole (uncredited)
- The Young Land (1959) as Juror (uncredited)
- Ada (1961) as Member of the State Legislature (uncredited)
- The Gun Hawk (1963) as Barfly (uncredited)
- 36 Hours (1965) as Man Paying Respects (uncredited)
- Requiem for a Gunfighter (1965) as Trial Spectator (uncredited)
- The Great Race (1965) as Barfly (uncredited)
- The Bounty Killer (1965) as Townsman (uncredited)
- A Big Hand for the Little Lady (1966) as Barfly (uncredited)
- The Cheyenne Social Club (1970) as Barfly (uncredited) (final film role)

=== Television ===
- Dick Tracy (1950) as Angel
- The Lone Ranger (1950–1953) as Jed / Hogjaw / Meeker
- Adventures of Wild Bill Hickok (1952) as Luke Barstow
- Death Valley Days (1952–1955) as Jim Byro / Dusty
- The Life and Legend of Wyatt Earp (1956) as Crummy Newton
- Annie Oakley (1956) as George Todd
- Tombstone Territory (1957) as Townsman
- The Deputy (1959) as Bartender / Barfly
- Gunsmoke (1960) as Trial Spectator
- The Rifleman (1960) as Blacksmith / Nels Swenson / Nils Swenson
- Wanted: Dead or Alive (1961) as Nels Svenson
- Whispering Smith (1961) as Barfly / Townsman
- The Dakotas (1963) as Miner
- Bonanza (1963) as Trial Spectator
- McHale's Navy (1965) as Gambler
- Pistols 'n' Petticoats (1966) as Church Member
