= Riders of the Santa Fe =

1944 film directed by Wallace Fox

- Theatrical release poster
- Directed by: Wallace Fox
- Screenplay by: Ande Lamb
- Produced by: Oliver Drake
- Starring: Rod Cameron; Fuzzy Knight; Eddie Dew; Jennifer Holt; Ray Whitley; Lane Chandler
- Cinematography: Maury Gertsman
- Edited by: Ray Snyder
- Production company: Universal Pictures
- Distributed by: Universal Pictures
- Release date: November 10, 1944
- Running time: 60 minutes
- Country: United States
- Language: English

Riders of the Santa Fe is a 1944 American Western film directed by Wallace Fox and written by Ande Lamb. The film stars Rod Cameron, Fuzzy Knight, Eddie Dew, Jennifer Holt, Ray Whitley and Lane Chandler. The film was released on November 10, 1944, by Universal Pictures.

== Cast ==
- Rod Cameron as Matt Conway
- Fuzzy Knight as Bullseye Johnson
- Eddie Dew as Larry Anderson
- Jennifer Holt as Carla Anderson
- Ray Whitley as Hank
- Lane Chandler as Earl Duncan
- Earle Hodgins as Ed Milton
- George Douglas as Tom Benner
- Richard Alexander as Biff McCauley
- Budd Buster as Otis Wade
- Ida Moore as Luella Tucker
