= Beyond the Pecos =

1945 film by Lambert Hillyer

- Theatrical release poster
- Directed by: Lambert Hillyer
- Screenplay by: Bennett Cohen
- Story by: Jay Karth
- Produced by: Oliver Drake
- Starring: Rod Cameron; Eddie Dew; Fuzzy Knight; Jennifer Holt; Ray Whitley; Gene Roth; Robert Homans; Jack Ingram
- Cinematography: Maury Gertsman
- Edited by: Ray Snyder
- Production company: Universal Pictures
- Distributed by: Universal Pictures
- Release date: April 27, 1945
- Running time: 58 minutes
- Country: United States
- Language: English

Beyond the Pecos is a 1945 American Western film directed by Lambert Hillyer and written by Bennett Cohen. The film stars Rod Cameron, Eddie Dew, Fuzzy Knight, Jennifer Holt, Ray Whitley, Gene Roth, Robert Homans and Jack Ingram. The film was released on April 27, 1945, by Universal Pictures.

== Cast ==
- Rod Cameron as Lew Remington
- Eddie Dew as Bob Randall
- Fuzzy Knight as Barnacle Pete Finnegan
- Jennifer Holt as Ellen Tanner
- Ray Whitley as Dan Muncie
- Gene Roth as John Heydrick
- Robert Homans as Ed Remington
- Jack Ingram as Steve Grenfels
- Frank Jaquet as Ord Tanner
- Henry Wills as Arizona
- Jack Rockwell as Keno Hawkins
