= The Old Texas Trail =

1944 film directed by Lewis D. Collins

- Theatrical release poster
- Directed by: Lewis D. Collins
- Screenplay by: William Lively
- Produced by: Oliver Drake
- Starring: Rod Cameron; Eddie Dew; Fuzzy Knight; Ray Whitley; Virginia Christine; Joseph J. Greene; Marjorie Clements; George Eldredge; Edmund Cobb
- Cinematography: William A. Sickner
- Edited by: Saul A. Goodkind
- Production company: Universal Pictures
- Distributed by: Universal Pictures
- Release date: December 15, 1944
- Running time: 60 minutes
- Country: United States
- Language: English

The Old Texas Trail is a 1944 American Western film directed by Lewis D. Collins and written by William Lively. The film stars Rod Cameron, Eddie Dew, Fuzzy Knight, Ray Whitley, Virginia Christine, Joseph J. Greene, Marjorie Clements, George Eldredge and Edmund Cobb. The film was released on December 15, 1944, by Universal Pictures.

== Plot ==
A western stageline is having trouble, and Jim Wiley (Rod Cameron) is sent in to find the problems. Wiley is shot, robbed of his ID and paperwork, and left for dead by those trying to disrupt the stageline. The thugs send in an imposter to impersonate Wiley and slow any progress. Wiley survives and gets a job on the stageline construction crew in the hopes of finding out who the leader is who's causing all the problems.

== Cast ==
- Rod Cameron as Jim Wiley aka Rawhide Carney
- Eddie Dew as Dave Stone
- Fuzzy Knight as Hinkly Pinkerton 'Pinky' Pinkly
- Ray Whitley as Amarillo
- Virginia Christine as Queenie Leone
- Joseph J. Greene as Jefferson Talbot
- Marjorie Clements as Mary Lane
- George Eldredge as Sparks Diamond
- Edmund Cobb as Joe Gardner aka Jim Wiley
- Jack Rube Clifford as Sheriff Thomas
