= Vivian Austin =

American actress (1920–2004)

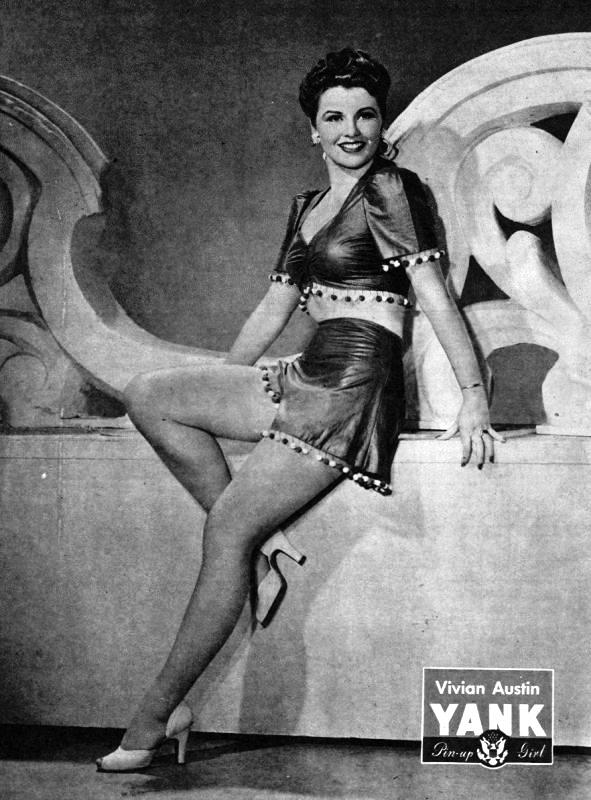
- Pin-up photo of Vivian Austin for Yank, the Army Weekly
- Born: Irene Vivian Coe; February 23, 1920; Hollywood, California
- Died: August 1, 2004 (aged 84); Los Angeles, California
- Other name: Terry Austin
- Occupation: Actress
- Spouses: Glenn Austin (m. 1937; died 1967) Kenneth A. Grow (died 1993)

Vivian Austin (born Irene Vivian Coe, February 23, 1920 – August 1, 2004) was an American actress who appeared in a number of films in the late 1930s and early 1940s, although most were B movies.

== Early years ==
Austin was born Irene Vivian Coe in Hollywood, California, and attended Hollywood High School. In 1937 she was the queen of the International Festival and Water Sports Carnival in Long Beach, California. She was named Miss Hollywood from 1937 through 1940.

== Career ==
Austin first had a film contract when she was 17 years old, but the option was not renewed. In 1939 she was a Hollywood showgirl, working for Earl Carroll, one of 50 women selected from more than 11,000 applicants. The selection was accompanied by regulations that made each woman subject to being fined or fired if she changed the style or color of her hair without permission and being weighed nightly to ensure that her weight did not change by more than one pound.

Austin played a variety of bit parts (as well as extra and stunt work) in movies before being cast as the female romantic lead in The Adventures of Red Ryder (1940). She was signed to a stock contract in 1943 by Universal and as Vivian Austin (for Universal) or Terry Austin (under contract to Eagle-Lion Films) appeared in movies such as Destiny (1944), Trigger Trail (1944), Born To Speed (1947) and Philo Vance Returns (1947). Her career was cut short in the late 1940s by kidney failure and resultant blindness.

== Later years ==
After her retirement, Austin helped Jane Russell to found the World Adoption International Fund (WAIF) and herself founded the Braille Auxiliary of the Desert, an organisation to support the charitable activities of the Braille Institute. In 1996 she lived in Palm Springs, California.

== Personal life ==
Austin married millionaire auto dealer Glenn Austin (d. 1967) when she was 17. She later wed ophthalmic surgeon Kenneth A. Grow (d. 1993), who had operated on her and helped to improve her sight.

== Death ==
On August 1, 2004, Austin died from natural causes in a hospital in Los Angeles, California. Because Grow had served in the United States Army, she and he are interred at Riverside National Cemetery in Riverside, California.

== Filmography ==
| Year | Title | Role | Notes |
|---|---|---|---|
| 1938 | The Goldwyn Follies | 'Gorgeous' Goldwyn Girl | Uncredited |
| 1938 | Love, Honor and Behave | Party Guest | Uncredited |
| 1938 | Men Are Such Fools | Nancy Sinclair | |
| 1940 | Adventures of Red Ryder | Beth Andrews | Serial |
| 1940 | Manhattan Heartbeat | Young Girl | Uncredited |
| 1942 | Yankee Doodle Dandy | Pianist | Uncredited |
| 1943 | Fired Wife | Divorcee | Uncredited |
| 1943 | Moonlight in Vermont | Brenda Allenby | |
| 1944 | Sing a Jingle | Ann | |
| 1944 | Ladies Courageous | | Uncredited |
| 1944 | Hi, Good Lookin'! | Phyllis | |
| 1944 | Moon Over Las Vegas | Grace Towers | |
| 1944 | Cobra Woman | Handmaiden | Uncredited |
| 1944 | Boss of Boomtown | Dale Starr | |
| 1944 | Twilight on the Prairie | Sally Barton | |
| 1944 | Trigger Trail | Ann Cattlet | |
| 1944 | The Singing Sheriff | Showgirl | Uncredited |
| 1944 | Destiny | Phyllis Prager | |
| 1944 | Night Club Girl | Phyllis Prager | |
| 1945 | Night Club Girl | Eleanor Kendall | |
| 1945 | She Gets Her Man | Maybelle Clark | |
| 1945 | Honeymoon Ahead | Rosita | |
| 1945 | Men in Her Diary | Linda | |
| 1947 | Born to Speed | Toni Bradley | |
| 1947 | Philo Vance's Gamble | Laurian March | |
| 1947 | Philo Vance Returns | Lorena Blendon Simms | |
| 1947 | Stepchild | Millie Lynne | |
| 1947 | T-Men | Genevieve | Uncredited, (final film role) |
