= Twilight on the Prairie =

1944 American western film

- Theatrical release poster
- Directed by: Jean Yarbrough
- Screenplay by: Clyde Bruckman
- Story by: Warren Wilson
- Produced by: Warren Wilson
- Starring: Johnny Downs; Vivian Austin; Leon Errol; Connie Haines; Eddie Quillan; Milburn Stone; Jimmie Dodd
- Cinematography: Jerome Ash
- Edited by: Fred R. Feitshans Jr.
- Production company: Universal Pictures
- Distributed by: Universal Pictures
- Release date: July 14, 1944
- Running time: 62 minutes
- Country: United States
- Language: English

Twilight on the Prairie is a 1944 American Western film directed by Jean Yarbrough and written by Clyde Bruckman. The film stars Johnny Downs, Vivian Austin, Leon Errol, Connie Haines, Eddie Quillan, Milburn Stone and Jimmie Dodd. The film was released on July 14, 1944, by Universal Pictures.

== Cast ==
- Johnny Downs as Bucky
- Vivian Austin as Sally Barton
- Leon Errol as Cactus
- Connie Haines as Ginger
- Eddie Quillan as Phil
- Milburn Stone as Gainsworth
- Jimmie Dodd as Chuck
- Olin Howland as Jed
- Perc Launders as Hank
- Foy Willing as Foy Willing
- Jack Teagarden as Jack Teagarden
- Dennis Moore as Jason
- Ralph Peters as Texas Bill
