= Salome, Where She Danced =

1945 film by Charles Lamont, B. Reeves Eason

- Directed by: Charles Lamont
- Written by: Laurence Stallings
- Based on: short story by Michael J. Phillips
- Produced by: Alexander Golitzen (associate producer); Walter Wanger (producer)
- Starring: Yvonne De Carlo
- Cinematography: W. Howard Greene; Hal Mohr
- Edited by: Russell F. Schoengarth
- Music by: Edward Ward
- Production company: Walter Wanger Productions
- Distributed by: Universal Pictures
- Release date: April 17, 1945 (United States)
- Running time: 90 minutes
- Country: United States
- Language: English
- Budget: $1,159,225
- Box office: $2,598,964

Salome, Where She Danced is a 1945 American Technicolor Western drama film, directed by Charles Lamont and starring: Yvonne De Carlo, Rod Cameron and Walter Slezak. The film follows the adventures of a dancer in 19th-century Europe and the United States. It is loosely based on the story of Lola Montez. Choreography was by Lester Horton.

== Plot ==
The film opens in Virginia in 1865, shortly after General Lee's surrender at Appomattox Court House. A war correspondent, Jim Steed, exchanges comments with Count von Bohlen, an arrogant Prussian army officer serving as a military attaché during the American Civil War. A year later, Steed is in Vienna shortly before the outbreak of the Austro-Prussian War of 1866. There, he encounters a famous dancer, Anna Marie, whom he persuades to spy for him on von Bohlen, now a member of the Prussian general staff, who has become infatuated with her. The secret plans, though, which they manage to pass on to the Austrians, are unable to prevent the decisive Prussian victory.

Escaping Vienna just ahead of the conquering Prussian army, they journey to the United States, where they plan to organize a career for her in show business. Stopping in a small western town to stage a show, they choose the exotic Salome for her debut, but it is robbed at gunpoint by local desperados. After the money is recovered from the bandits, the town elders decide by popular acclaim to rename the settlement "Salome, Where She Danced". The bandit leader, Cleve Blunt, an ex-Confederate soldier, develops a romantic interest in Anna Marie and accompanies her on the journey westward.

After moving on to San Francisco, they persuade a wealthy Russian colonel to back her career. Just as she is set to make a success, the arrival of Count von Bohlen seeking revenge leads to a final confrontation.

== Cast ==
- Yvonne De Carlo as Anna Marie
- Rod Cameron as Jim Steed
- David Bruce as Cleve Blunt
- Walter Slezak as Col. Ivan Dimitrioff
- Albert Dekker as Count Erik von Bohlen
- Marjorie Rambeau as Madam Europe
- J. Edward Bromberg as Prof. Max
- Abner Biberman as Dr. Ling
- John Litel as General Robert E. Lee
- Kurt Katch as Count Von Bismarck
- Richard Alexander as Shotgun (uncredited)
- Larry Steers as Party Guest (uncredited)

== Production ==
The project had originally been connected to John Ford in 1941, but it was acquired by producer Walter Wanger. He envisaged it as "an Arabian nights story in a Western setting".

The film was loosely based on a short story inspired by the Arizona legend about a town, "Drinkmens Wells", which came to be known as "Salome, Where She Danced". The story was about a Mexican dance-hall performer called "Salome", who danced to hold the attention of a group of outlaws and give the law-abiding members of the town enough time to assemble and arm in protection of their homes. The script expanded the story to incorporate characters such as Robert E. Lee and Bismarck.

=== Casting ===
Yvonne De Carlo had been under contract to Paramount Pictures and had been short-listed for important roles in The Story of Dr Wassell and Rainbow Island without actually being given them. She was cast in September 1944. Wanger later said he discovered her by looking at a camera test of another actor in which De Carlo also appeared. Another source says 21 Royal Canadian Air Force bombardier students who loved her as a pinup star campaigned to get her the role. De Carlo later said this was done at her behest; she took several pictures of herself in a revealing costume and got two childhood friends from Vancouver, Reginald Reid and Kenneth Ross McKenzie, who had become pilots, to arrange their friends to lobby on her behalf.

The crew at Universal was set to shoot a wardrobe test for Ava Gardner on a sound stage at Universal. Gardner did not show, and art director Alexander Golitzen ran to producer Walter Wanger's office, asking: "Walter, what the hell is happening?" Wanger replied: "MGM just called, they wouldn't let her go." Yvonne De Carlo was in waiting room with her agent and Golitzen said: "Why don't we test her." Golitzen grabbed De Carlo and raced her to the wardrobe department, and that was it. Golitzen also received an associate production credit for the film.

=== Shooting ===
Filming took 64 days at a budget of almost $1.2 million.

== Reception ==
On its release, the film received one of the worst critical receptions of any of Wanger's films. Nonetheless, the film made a profit of $149,387 and launched Yvonne De Carlo as a star.

== In popular culture ==
In Indian Hindi-language novel Gunaho Ka Devta, there is a reference of the film in a scene where lead characters Chandra and Pammi went to watch cinema together, but got confused by the Biblical story of Salome.

== See also ==
- Public domain film
- List of American films of 1945
- List of films in the public domain in the United States
