= Broadway Serenade =

1939 film by Robert Zigler Leonard

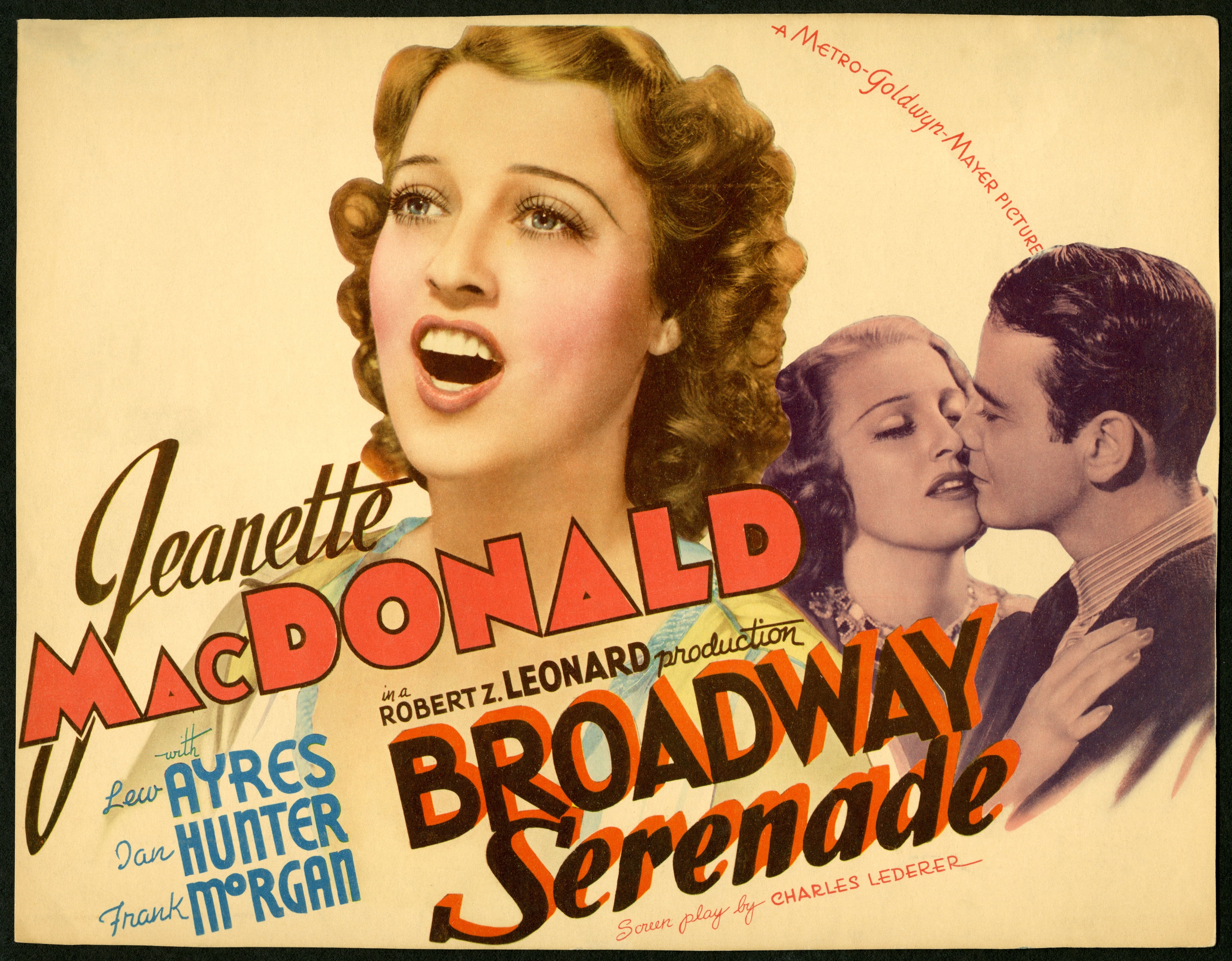
- Theatrical release poster
- Directed by: Robert Z. Leonard
- Screenplay by: Charles Lederer
- Story by: Lew Lipton; John Taintor Foote; Hans Kraly
- Produced by: Robert Z. Leonard
- Starring: Jeanette MacDonald; Lew Ayres; Ian Hunter
- Cinematography: Oliver T. Marsh
- Edited by: Harold F. Kress; W. Donn Hayes (uncredited)
- Music by: Herbert Stothart; Edward Ward (uncredited)
- Production company: Metro-Goldwyn-Mayer
- Release date: April 7, 1939
- Running time: 114 minutes
- Country: United States
- Language: English
- Budget: $1,284,000
- Box office: $617,000 (Domestic earnings) $617,000 (Foreign earnings)

Broadway Serenade (also known as Serenade) is a 1939 musical drama film distributed by MGM, produced and directed by Robert Z. Leonard. The screenplay was written by Charles Lederer, based on a story by Lew Lipton, John Taintor Foote and Hanns Kräly. The music score is by Herbert Stothart and Edward Ward.

== Cast ==
- Jeanette MacDonald as Mary Hale
- Lew Ayres as James Geoffrey 'Jimmy' Seymour
- Ian Hunter as Larry Bryant
- Frank Morgan as Cornelius Collier, Jr.
- Wally Vernon as Joey, the Jinx
- Rita Johnson as Judith 'Judy' Tyrrell
- Virginia Grey as Pearl
- William Gargan as Bill Foster
- Katharine Alexander as Harriet Ingalls
- Al Shean as Herman
- Esther Dale as Mrs. Olsen, the Landlady
- Franklin Pangborn as Gene, Collier's Composer
- E. Alyn Warren as Everett
- Paul Hurst as Reynolds, a Drunk
- Frank Orth as Mr. Fellows
- Esther Howard as Mrs. Fellows
- Leon Belasco as Squeaker, the Violinist
- Kitty McHugh as Kitty, Mary's Maid
- Kenny Stevens as Singer
- Ray Walker as Denny Madison
- Claude King as Mr. Gato
