= Leon Belasco =

Russian-American actor and musician (1902–1988)

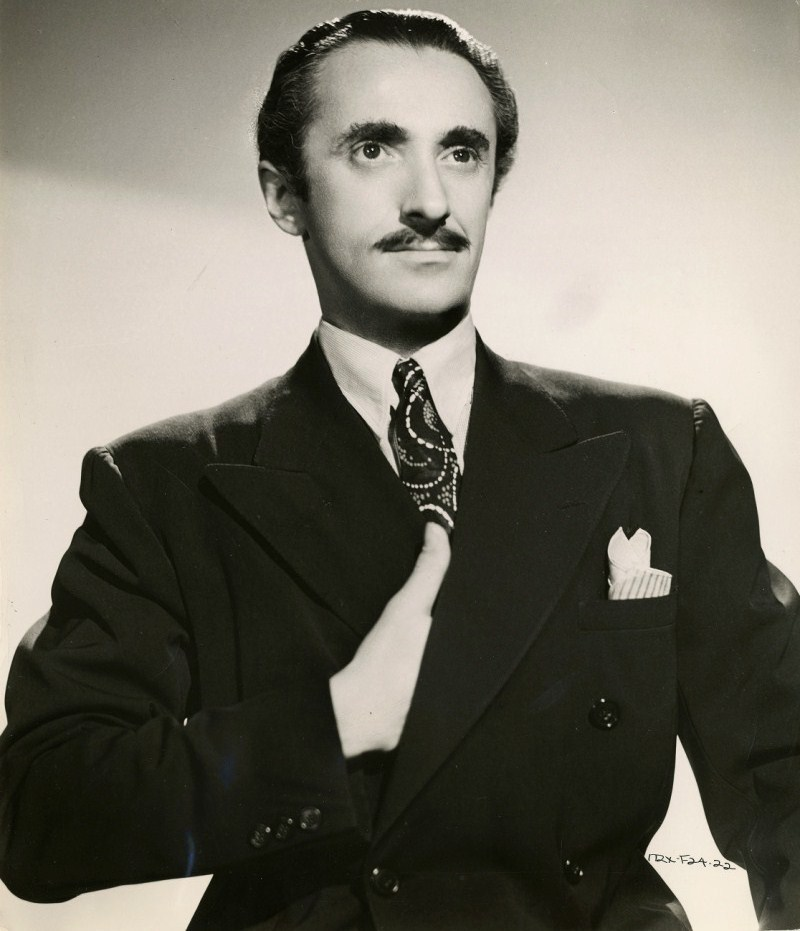
- Belasco in Topper Takes a Trip (1938)
- Born: Leonid Simeonovich Berladsky; 11 October 1902; Odessa, Russian Empire
- Died: 1 June 1988 (aged 85); Orange, California, U.S.
- Occupations: Actor; musician
- Years active: 1926–1983
- Spouse: Julia Bruner (m. 1935; div. 1939)

Leon Belasco (born Leonid Semyonovich Berladsky; Russian: Леонид Семёнович Берладский; 11 October 1902 – 1 June 1988) was a Russian and American actor and musician who had a career in film and television that spanned from the 1920s to the 1980s, appearing in more than 100 films.

== Musical career ==
Born in Odessa, Russia, Belasco attended St. Joseph College in Yokohama, Japan, and trained as a musician in Japan and Manchuria. He was briefly the concertmaster of the Japanese-Russian Symphony Orchestra, a predecessor of the NHK Symphony Orchestra.

When he moved on his own to California in 1921 (leaving his parents and brother behind in Harbin, Manchuria), Belasco found occasional work in Hollywood. He made his film debut in 1926 in the silent film The Best People. To supplement his income, he played the violin. Later he formed his own band, which mainly performed in hotels in and around New York City. The Andrews Sisters were introduced through his band.

In 1933, Belasco and his orchestra were heard on the Oldsmobile Program on CBS radio.

Belasco's recordings include "Did You Ever See a Dream Walking"/"Many Moons Ago" (Vocalion 2590-B, 1934)

== Film career ==
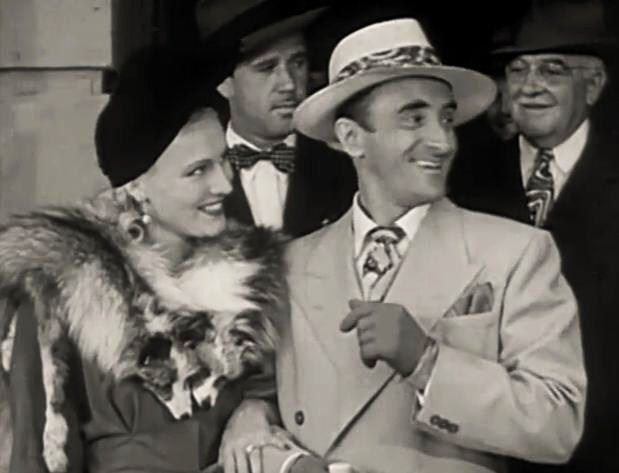
Belasco with June Clyde in Hollywood and Vine (1945)

During a season break from a hotel engagement, he returned to Hollywood, first appearing in Broadway Serenade and Topper Takes a Trip (1938). He acted in 13 films in 1942, including Holiday Inn, Casablanca, Yankee Doodle Dandy, and Road to Morocco.

He appeared with the Marx Brothers in their last film together, Love Happy (1949). Being able to speak Russian, he was a dialogue director in Norman Jewison's 1966 comedy The Russians Are Coming, the Russians Are Coming.

Belasco often played eccentric or befuddled European and ethnic characters. He also played heavier roles in espionage dramas. On radio, he played a thieving informant in The Man Called X. His best-known television role was as Appopoplous the landlord in My Sister Eileen (1960). His last film was Superdad (1973), and his final television movie was Woman of the Year (1976).

== Television career ==
Beginning in 1953, Belasco appeared in a variety of television shows, including Maverick (1961), Twilight Zone (1963), My Favorite Martian,(1965) The Lucy Show (1963), The Beverly Hillbillies (1964–1967), My Three Sons (1966), The Dick Van Dyke Show (1966), The Man from U.N.C.L.E. (1966), Little House on the Prairie (1978) and Trapper John, M.D. (1980).

== Personal life and death ==
Belasco married actress Julia Bruner in New York City on 14 April 1935. They were divorced on 5 June 1939.

Belasco was Jewish and in a 1943 article in the Colorado Intermountain Jewish News, he was listed among a number of other well-known Jews in the film industry who had joined the military during World War II. Belasco's name appeared alongside those of Don Castle, Melvyn Douglas, George E. Stone, Sid Silvers, Billy Halop, Max Baer, Fritz Feld, Max Rosenbloom, and Tony Martin.

Belasco died on June 1, 1988, in Orange, California, aged 85. He was cremated, and his ashes scattered.

== Selected filmography ==
- The Saint in New York (1938) - Driver (uncredited)
- Dramatic School (1938) - Nightclub Announcer (uncredited)
- Topper Takes a Trip (1938) - Bellboy
- Fisherman's Wharf (1939) - Luigi
- Beauty for the Asking (1939) - Beauty Shop Owner (uncredited)
- Broadway Serenade (1939) - 'Squeaker'
- The Flying Irishman (1939) - Russian Commentator (uncredited)
- Good Girls Go to Paris (1939) - Nightclub Violinist (uncredited)
- Man About Town (1939) - Arab Petitioner in Show (uncredited)
- Lady of the Tropics (1939) - Assistant to Manager (uncredited)
- On Your Toes (1939) - Mishka - Slave in Ballet (uncredited)
- Legion of Lost Flyers (1939) - 'Frenchy' Rogian
- I Take This Woman (1940) - Pancho (uncredited)
- It's a Date (1940) - Captain of Waiters (uncredited)
- My Favorite Wife (1940) - Waiter - Pacific Club Poolside (uncredited)
- The Lady in Question (1940) - Barber (uncredited)
- Lucky Partners (1940) - Nick #1
- The Mummy's Hand (1940) - Ali
- Spring Parade (1940) - Violinist Orchestra Leader
- Melody and Moonlight (1940) - Maestro (uncredited)
- Tugboat Annie Sails Again (1940) - Headwaiter (uncredited)
- Comrade X (1940) - Comrade Baronoff - Hotel Manager (uncredited)
- Where Did You Get That Girl? (1941) - Hayden
- Tall, Dark and Handsome (1941) - Alfredo Herrera
- Abdul the Bulbul-Ameer (1941, Short) - (voice, uncredited)
- A Girl, a Guy, and a Gob (1941) - First Taxi Driver (uncredited)
- They Dare Not Love (1941) - Pierre (uncredited)
- I'll Wait for You (1941) - Mr. Lapagos, the Tailor
- Kisses for Breakfast (1941) - Piano Accompanist (uncredited)
- Ringside Maisie (1941) - Shady Lawn Band Leader (uncredited)
- Hold Back the Dawn (1941) - Mr. Spitzer (uncredited)
- It Started with Eve (1941) - Couturier (uncredited)
- Never Give a Sucker an Even Break (1941) - Pianist (uncredited)
- Nothing but the Truth (1941) - Dr. Zarak
- Niagara Falls (1941) - Head Waiter
- The Chocolate Soldier (1941) - Waiter at the Double Eagle (uncredited)
- Skylark (1941) - Long-Haired Man in Subway Car
- The Night of January 16th (1941) - Airplane Steward (uncredited)
- Design for Scandal (1941) - Alexander Raoul
- Playmates (1941) - Prince Maharoohu (uncredited)
- Roxie Hart (1942) - Waiter (uncredited)
- The Night Before the Divorce (1942) - Leo - the Headwaiter
- Always in My Heart (1942) - Luke (uncredited)
- Kid Glove Killer (1942) - Chris Spyro - Cook (uncredited)
- Yankee Doodle Dandy (1942) - Magician (uncredited)
- Night in New Orleans (1942) - Waiter in Tavern (uncredited)
- Holiday Inn (1942) - Flower Shop Proprietor (uncredited)
- Give Out, Sisters (1942) - Waiter
- Henry Aldrich, Editor (1942) - Leon Brink
- Between Us Girls (1942) - Nightclub Patron (uncredited)
- Highways by Night (1942) - Howard (uncredited)
- Road to Morocco (1942) - Yusef (uncredited)
- That Other Woman (1942) - Walter
- Casablanca (1942) - Dealer in Rick's Café (uncredited)
- Over My Dead Body (1942) - Pierre
- It Comes Up Love (1943) - Orchestra Leader
- Hers to Hold (1943) - Orchestra Leader (uncredited)
- The Heat's On (1943) - Shore - the Agent (uncredited)
- She's for Me (1943) - Acton
- The Gang's All Here (1943) - Waiter (uncredited)
- Chip Off the Old Block (1944) - Pianist (uncredited)
- And the Angels Sing (1944) - Waiter (uncredited)
- Pin Up Girl (1944) - Mario (uncredited)
- Meet the People (1944) - Milo (uncredited)
- San Diego, I Love You (1944) - Violinist (uncredited)
- The Conspirators (1944) - Vincent's Waiter (uncredited)
- An American Romance (1944) - Cigar Store Proprietor (uncredited)
- Storm Over Lisbon (1944) - Fado Singer (uncredited)
- Night Club Girl (1945) - Gaston
- See My Lawyer (1945) - Violinist (uncredited)
- Earl Carroll Vanities (1945) - Baron Dashek
- Hollywood and Vine (1945) - Cedric Borris
- Wonder Man (1945) - Pianist (uncredited)
- Easy to Look At (1945) - Phillipe
- Out of This World (1945) - Leon (uncredited)
- Yolanda and the Thief (1945) - Taxi Driver
- Swing Parade of 1946 (1946) - Pete
- Suspense (1946) - Pierre Yasha
- Holiday in Mexico (1946) - Orchestra Leader (uncredited)
- Little Iodine (1946) - Simkins
- It Happened on Fifth Avenue (1947) - Musician (uncredited)
- Philo Vance Returns (1947) - Alexis Karnoff
- Three Daring Daughters (1948) - Ship Bandleader (uncredited)
- I, Jane Doe (1948) - Duroc
- For the Love of Mary (1948) - Igor
- Adventures of Don Juan (1948) - Don de Cordoba (uncredited)
- Every Girl Should Be Married (1948) - Violinist
- Jiggs and Maggie in Jackpot Jitters (1949) - Gambler (uncredited)
- Holiday in Havana (1949) - Luis Amantado (uncredited)
- Love Happy (1949) - Mr. Lyons
- Everybody Does It (1949) - Prof. Hugo
- Bagdad (1949) - Beggar
- Nancy Goes to Rio (1950) - Prof. Gama (uncredited)
- Ma and Pa Kettle Go to Town (1950) - Beauty Salon Manager (uncredited)
- Please Believe Me (1950) - The Croupier
- Love That Brute (1950) - François Ducray aka Frenchy
- The Flame and the Arrow (1950) - Arturo of Milan / Players' Impresario / Court Announcer (uncredited)
- Abbott and Costello in the Foreign Legion (1950) - Hassam—Auctioneer
- The Toast of New Orleans (1950) - Dominiques' Orchestra Leader (uncredited)
- Bomba and the Hidden City (1950) - Raschid
- Cuban Fireball (1951) - Hunyabi
- Little Egypt (1951) - Moulai
- Havana Rose (1951) - Renaldi
- The Golden Horde (1951) - Nazza the Astrologer (uncredited)
- The Fabulous Senorita (1952) - Señor Gonzales
- Gobs and Gals (1952) - Peter
- Son of Ali Baba (1952) - Babu
- Jalopy (1953) - Prof. Bosgood Elrod
- Call Me Madam (1953) - Leader (uncredited)
- Geraldine (1953) - Professor Dubois
- Can-Can (1960) - Arturo - orchestra leader
- My Six Loves (1963) - Mario
- The Art of Love (1965) - Prince
- Superdad (1973) - Limousine Driver
- Won Ton Ton: The Dog Who Saved Hollywood (1976) - Fromberg Butler With Phone Call (uncredited)
