= Howard Welsch =

American film producer

Howard Welsch (1898–1980) was an American film producer. He owned Fidelity Pictures.

He was in charge of a producing unit at Universal which was dissolved in 1946. He formed Fidelity Pictures in 1948.

== Select credits ==
- Falling in Love (1934)
- Men in Her Diary (1945)
- The Daltons Ride Again (1945)
- Smooth as Silk (1946)
- Idea Girl (1946)
- The Spider Woman Strikes Back (1946)
- The Cat Creeps (1946)
- Cuban Pete (1946)
- The Dark Horse (1947)
- The Michigan Kid (1947)
- Philo Vance's Gamble (1947)
- Philo Vance Returns (1947)
- Return of the Vigilantes (1947)
- Philo Vance's Secret Mission (1947)
- House by the River (1950)
- Woman on the Run (1950)
- The Groom Wore Spurs (1951)
- The San Francisco Story (1952)
- Montana Belle (1952)
- Rancho Notorious (1952)
- A Bullet Is Waiting (1954)
- Hot Blood (1956)
