= Law and Order (1932 film) =

1932 film

- Theatrical release poster
- Directed by: Edward L. Cahn
- Screenplay by: Tom Reed; John Huston
- Based on: Saint Johnson; 1930 novel by W.R. Burnett
- Produced by: Carl Laemmle Jr.
- Starring: Walter Huston; Harry Carey; Raymond Hatton; Russell Hopton; Ralph Ince; Andy Devine
- Cinematography: Jackson Rose
- Edited by: Philip Cahn
- Music by: David Broekman; David Klatzkin
- Distributed by: Universal Pictures
- Release date: February 28, 1932
- Running time: 75 minutes
- Country: United States
- Language: English

Law and Order is a 1932 American pre-Code Western film starring Walter Huston, Harry Carey, Andy Devine, Russell Hopton and Russell Simpson. It was the first movie to depict the Gunfight at the O.K. Corral, in Tombstone, Arizona.

The film is based on the novel Saint Johnson, by W. R. Burnett. Walter Huston plays the part of lawman Frame Johnson, a fictionalized version of Wyatt Earp, and Russell Hopton plays his brother Luther Johnson. An acclaimed early Western due to its character development, Law and Order features a script by John Huston, Walter's soon-to-be-famous son, and Tom Reed, who provided dialog for many movies in the 1930s and 1940s. Because of changes made during the film's production, all scenes involving actress Lois Wilson were cut prior to the film's release, despite initially being second billed and credited on initial theatrical release posters.

== Cast ==
- Walter Huston as Frame Johnson
- Harry Carey as Ed Brandt
- Russell Hopton as Luther Johnson
- Raymond Hatton as Deadwood
- Ralph Ince as Poe Northrup
- Harry Woods as Walt Northrup
- Richard Alexander as Kurt Northrup
- Russell Simpson as Judge R.W. Williams
- Andy Devine as Johnny Kinsman
- Hank Bell as Barfly (uncredited)
- Walter Brennan as Lanky Smith (uncredited)
- Nelson McDowell as Parker Brother (uncredited)

== Production ==
Burnett wrote the original novel by travelling to Tombstone Arizona. He said Earp's widow disliked the book and tried to prevent the film from being made.

== Home media ==
In 2025, Law and Order was released on Blu-ray by Kino Lorber.
