= Philo Vance's Secret Mission =

1947 film directed by Reginald LeBorg

- Directed by: Reginald LeBorg
- Written by: Lawrence Taylor
- Produced by: Howard Welsch
- Starring: Alan Curtis; Sheila Ryan; Tala Birell
- Cinematography: Jackson Rose
- Edited by: W. Donn Hayes
- Production company: Producers Releasing Corporation
- Distributed by: Eagle-Lion Films
- Release date: August 30, 1947
- Running time: 58 minutes
- Country: United States
- Language: English

Philo Vance's Secret Mission is a 1947 American mystery film directed by Reginald LeBorg and starring Alan Curtis, Sheila Ryan and Tala Birell. It was part of a series of films featuring the detective Philo Vance made during the 1930s and 1940s.

== Plot ==
Philo Vance is approached by the head of a publishing company to become an advisor on a series of crime novels they are releasing. Before long he is embroiled in a case about the mysterious killing of one of the partners in the company.

== Cast ==
- Alan Curtis as Philo Vance
- Sheila Ryan as Mona Bannister
- Tala Birell as Mrs. Elizabeth Phillips
- Frank Jenks as Ernie Clark
- James Bell as Sheriff Harry Madison
- Frank Fenton as Paul Morgan
- Paul Maxey as Martin Jamison
- Kenneth Farrell as Joe, the Photographer
- Toni Todd as Louise Roberts aka Mrs. Paul Morgan
- David Leonard as Carl Wilson
- William Newell as Deputy
- Tom Quinn as Haddon Phillips
- Harry Strang as Ship's Purser
- Frank Wilcox as Thaddius Carter

== Production ==
Philo Vance’s Secret Mission was director LaBorg’s only picture for Producers Releasing Corporation (PRC), and filmed at the Samuel Goldwyn Studio. According to director Reginald LeBorg, PRC was a low budget outfit, and acknowledged that some films were shot in two or three days, incorporating stock footage.

Though PRC executives were satisfied with his efficient handling of the production, LeBorg claims to have declined to make another film for them. However, whether there was ever any actual offer to make another film for PRC is debatable; the production arm of the company permanently dissolved the same month Philo Vance’s Secret Mission was completed.

The film's sets were designed by the art directors Edward C. Jewell and Perry Smith.

== Retrospective appraisal ==
Of the three films in the Vance series produced by PRC, Philo Vance’s Secret Mission “is perhaps the most accomplished,” according to critic Wheeler W. Dixon.

Director LeBorg departed PRC and returned to Columbia Pictures. Dixon makes this observation regarding PRC:

For most directors, PRC was the last rung on the way to the bottom, or the first rung on the way up. LeBorg was lucky to escape and return to the majors, even if his escape was to the “B” unit of a former Poverty Row studio, which was precisely what Columbia in its earlier days had been.

== Bibliography ==
- Backer, Ron. Mystery Movie Series of 1930s Hollywood. McFarland, 2012.
