= Philo Vance's Gamble =

- Directed by: Basil Wrangell
- Written by: Eugene Conrad; Arthur St. Claire; Lawrence Taylor
- Based on: the character created by S.S. Van Dine
- Produced by: Howard Welsch
- Starring: Alan Curtis; Vivian Austin; Tala Birell
- Cinematography: Jackson Rose
- Edited by: W. Donn Hayes
- Music by: Alvin Levin
- Production company: Producers Releasing Corporation
- Distributed by: Producers Releasing Corporation
- Release date: April 12, 1947
- Running time: 62 minutes
- Country: United States
- Language: English

Philo Vance's Gamble is a 1947 American mystery film directed by Basil Wrangell and starring Alan Curtis, Vivian Austin and Tala Birell. It was the first of three films featuring the detective Philo Vance made by the Producers Releasing Corporation, as part of a loose series of Vance films stretching back to 1929.

== Plot ==
Private Detective Philo Vance gets involved with a succession of murders and a mystery concerning the disappearance of an emerald that has been smuggled into the United States.

== Cast ==
- Alan Curtis as Philo Vance
- Vivian Austin as Laurian March
- Frank Jenks as Ernie Clark
- Tala Birell as Mrs. Tina Cromwell
- Gavin Gordon as Oliver Tennant
- Cliff Clark as Inspector Walsh
- James Burke as Lt. Burke
- Toni Todd as Geegee Desmond
- Francis Pierlot as Roberts the Butler
- Joseph Crehan as Dist. Atty. Ellis Mason
- Garnett Marks as Charles O'Mara
- Grady Sutton as Mr. Willetts
- Charles Mitchell as Guy Harkness
- Joanne Frank as Norma Harkness
- Dan Seymour as Jeffrey Connor
- Karolyn Grimes as Pat Roberts

== Bibliography ==
- Backer, Ron. Mystery Movie Series of 1930s Hollywood. McFarland, 2012.
