= Trigger Trail =

1944 film directed by Lewis D. Collins

- Directed by: Lewis D. Collins
- Written by: Patricia Harper
- Screenplay by: Ed Earl Repp
- Produced by: Oliver Drake
- Starring: Rod Cameron
- Cinematography: William A. Sickner
- Edited by: Milton Carruth
- Production company: Universal Pictures
- Distributed by: Universal Pictures
- Release date: July 7, 1944
- Running time: 59 minutes
- Country: United States
- Language: English

Trigger Trail is a 1944 American Western film directed by Lewis D. Collins and starring Rod Cameron.

== Plot ==
A cowboy intervenes when greedy businessmen try to trick homesteaders into forfeiting their land.

== Cast ==
- Rod Cameron as Clint Farrel
- Fuzzy Knight as Echo
- Eddie Dew as Sheriff Bob Reynolds
- Vivian Austin as Ann Catlett
- Ray Whitley as Gilroy
- Lane Chandler as Slade
- George Eldredge as Rance Hudson
- Robert 'Buzz' Henry as Chip Kincaid (as 'Buzz' Henry)
- Davison Clark as Silas Farrel
- Michael Vallon as Bender
- Richard Alexander as Henchman Waco (as Dick Alexander)
- Jack Rockwell as Joe Kincaid
- Budd Buster as Tug Cattlet
- The Six Bar Cowboys as cowhands / musicians (as the Bar-Six Cowboys)

== See also ==
- List of American films of 1944
