= Night Club Girl =

1945 film directed by Edward F. Cline

- Theatrical release poster
- Directed by: Edward F. Cline
- Screenplay by: Henry Blankfort; Dick Irving Hyland
- Story by: Adele Comandini
- Produced by: Frank Gross
- Starring: Vivian Austin; Edward Norris; Maxie Rosenbloom; Minna Gombell; Judy Clark; Bill Dunn
- Cinematography: Charles Van Enger
- Edited by: Charles Maynard
- Production company: Universal Pictures
- Distributed by: Universal Pictures
- Release date: January 5, 1945
- Running time: 60 minutes
- Country: United States
- Language: English

Night Club Girl is a 1945 American comedy film directed by Edward F. Cline and written by Henry Blankfort and Dick Irving Hyland. The film stars Vivian Austin, Edward Norris, Maxie Rosenbloom, Minna Gombell, Judy Clark and Bill Dunn. The film was released on January 5, 1945, by Universal Pictures.

== Plot ==
As they embark on their journey to Hollywood, Charlie and Eleanor Kendall, a sibling duo fresh off a talent competition victory, wave goodbye to their supportive community in Windebaggo, Missouri. Despite their initial enthusiasm, the pair find themselves out of luck in the city of stars, resorting to sleeping in their car and scavenging for food. It's not until Clark Phillips, a keen-eyed journalist, catches the Kendalls honing their craft that a glimmer of hope appears. Clark manages to secure them a tryout at the Sunset Club, despite owner Percival J. Percival's reluctance. A well-intentioned meal before their performance backfires when the hungry siblings overindulge, rendering them too full to dance. However, fate takes a turn when they perform for the club's staff post-closure, earning accolades for their talent. The club's coat check employee Rita extends her hospitality, offering them lodging and helping them land jobs at the club. Yet, their newfound stability is short-lived as an unexpected incident involving a crying infant in Eleanor's care leads to their dismissal. More complications arise.

== Cast ==
- Vivian Austin as Eleanor Kendall
- Edward Norris as Clark Phillips
- Maxie Rosenbloom as Percival J. Percival
- Minna Gombell as Rita
- Judy Clark as Janie
- Bill Dunn as Charlie Kendall
- Leon Belasco as Gaston
- Andrew Tombes as Simmons
- Fred Sanborn as Fred
- Clem Bevans as Mayor
- Virginia Brissac as Ma Kendall
- Emmett Vogan as Cass
- George Davis as Carlos
- The Delta Rhythm Boys as Themselves
- Paula Drake as Singer
- The Mulcays as Themselves
