= Born to Speed =

1947 film

- Theatrical release poster
- Directed by: Edward L. Cahn
- Screenplay by: Crane Wilbur; Scott Darling; Robert B. Churchill
- Story by: Robert B. Churchill
- Produced by: Marvin D. Stahl
- Starring: Johnny Sands; Vivian Austin; Don Castle; Frank Orth; Geraldine Wall; Joe Haworth
- Cinematography: Jackson Rose
- Edited by: W. Donn Hayes
- Music by: Alvin Levin
- Production company: Producers Releasing Corporation
- Distributed by: Producers Releasing Corporation
- Release date: January 12, 1947
- Running time: 61 minutes
- Country: United States
- Language: English

Born to Speed is a 1947 American action film directed by Edward L. Cahn and written by Crane Wilbur, Scott Darling and Robert B. Churchill. The film stars Johnny Sands, Vivian Austin, Don Castle, Frank Orth, Geraldine Wall and Joe Haworth. It was released on January 12, 1947 by Producers Releasing Corporation.

== Plot ==
Young race car driver Johnny Randall falls in love with Toni Bradley. She hates racing because her brother was killed in a midget car race. Johnny's mother also objects because his father was killed in the Indianapolis 500. Nonetheless, he continues to race, narrowly escaping death when a jealous rival driver tries to bump him off.

== Cast ==
- Johnny Sands as Johnny Randall
- Vivian Austin as Toni Bradley
- Don Castle as Mike Conroy
- Frank Orth as "Breezy" Bradley
- Geraldine Wall as Mrs. Kay Randall
- Joe Haworth as Duke Hudkins
