= Emmett Vogan =

American actor (1893–1969)

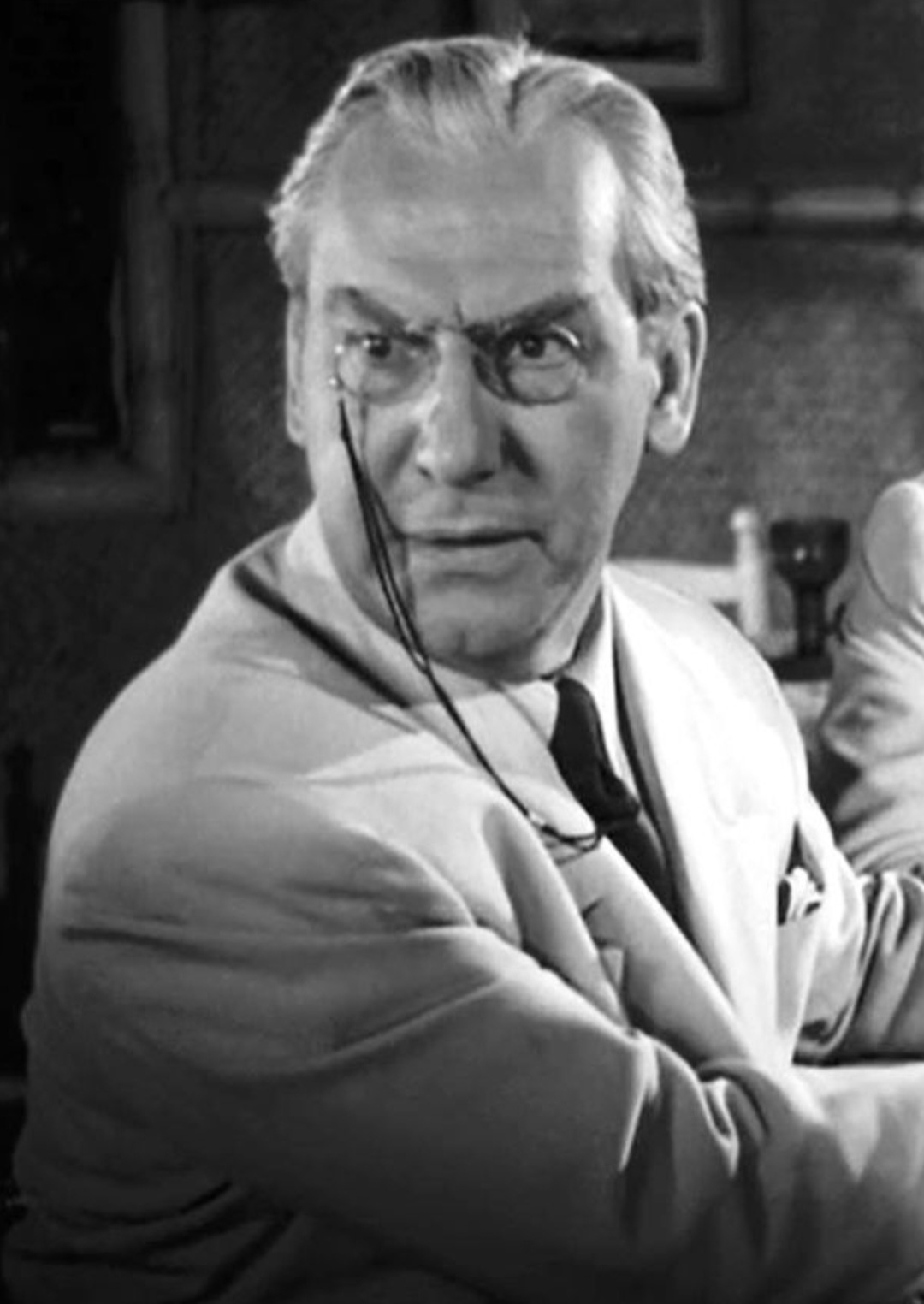
- Vogan in Dangerous Money (1946)
- Born: Charles Emmett Vogan; September 27, 1893; Lima, Ohio, U.S.
- Died: October 6, 1969 (aged 76); Los Angeles, California, U.S.
- Occupation: Actor
- Years active: 1934–1957
- Spouse: Edythe Evelyn Lawrence

Charles Emmett Vogan (September 27, 1893 – October 6, 1969) was an American actor with almost 500 film appearances from 1934 to 1954, making him, along with Bess Flowers, one of the most prolific film actors of all time.

In 1913, Vogan acted with the Allen and Kenna Musical Comedy Company. In 1917, he was the male lead in a touring company that presented The Four Husbands. He also was the male lead in the touring production of Too Much Mustard (1924). In 1927 he was the star with Robert McLaughlin's company in Cleveland, Ohio.

Vogan also acted with the Anderson Players, the Wilkes Players, and the O.D. Woodward group, in addition to having a headline vaudeville act.

== Selected filmography ==
- Love Birds (1934)
- Super Speed (1935)
- G Men (1935) as Bill, the Ballistics Expert (uncredited)
- Let's Get Married (1937)
- San Quentin (1937) as Lieutenant
- Sergeant Murphy (1938)
- Female Fugitive (1938)
- Emergency Landing (1941)
- Margin for Error (1943)
- Mystery Broadcast (1943)
- The Crime Smasher (1943)
- Faces in the Fog (1944)
- Along the Navajo Trail (1945)
- Blood on the Sun (1945)
- Senorita from the West (1945)
- She Gets Her Man (1945)
- Night Club Girl (1945)
- Dangerous Money (1946)
- The Shadow Returns (1946)
- Cover Up (1949)
- The Sickle or the Cross (1949)
- Batman and Robin (1949, Serial) as Mr. Williams [Chs. 1, 3, 12-14] (uncredited)
- The Big Gusher (1951)
