= Philo Vance Returns =

1947 film by William Beaudine

- Directed by: William Beaudine
- Written by: Robert E. Kent
- Based on: character created by S.S. Van Dine
- Produced by: Howard Welsch
- Starring: William Wright; Vivian Austin; Leon Belasco; Clara Blandick
- Cinematography: Jackson Rose
- Edited by: Gene Fowler Jr.
- Music by: Albert Glasser
- Production company: Producers Releasing Corporation
- Distributed by: Producers Releasing Corporation
- Release date: April 14, 1947
- Running time: 64 minutes
- Country: United States
- Language: English

Philo Vance Returns is a 1947 American mystery film directed by William Beaudine and starring William Wright, Vivian Austin and Leon Belasco. It is one of a series of films featuring private detective Philo Vance.

== Plot ==
Vance investigates the murders of a newly engaged couple.

== Cast ==
- William Wright as Philo Vance
- Vivian Austin as Lorena Blendon Simms
- Leon Belasco as Alexis Karnoff
- Clara Blandick as Stella Blendon
- Ramsay Ames as Virginia Berneaux
- Damian O'Flynn as Larry Blendon
- Frank Wilcox as George Hullman
- Iris Adrian as Maggie McCarthy Blendon
- Ann Staunton as Helen Varney Blendon
- Tim Murdock as The Policeman
- Mary Scott as Mary, the Maid

== Bibliography ==
- Marshall, Wendy L. William Beaudine: From Silents to Television. Scarecrow Press, 2005.
