= Brimstone (1949 film) =

1949 film by Joseph Kane

- Theatrical release poster
- Directed by: Joseph Kane
- Screenplay by: Thames Williamson
- Story by: Norman S. Hall
- Produced by: Joseph Kane
- Starring: Rod Cameron; Lorna Gray; Walter Brennan; Forrest Tucker; Jack Holt; Jim Davis
- Cinematography: Jack A. Marta
- Edited by: Arthur Roberts
- Music by: Nathan Scott
- Production company: Republic Pictures
- Distributed by: Republic Pictures
- Release date: August 15, 1949 (United States)
- Running time: 90 minutes
- Country: United States
- Language: English

Brimstone is a 1949 American Trucolor Western film directed by Joseph Kane and written by Thames Williamson. The film stars Rod Cameron, Lorna Gray, Walter Brennan, Forrest Tucker, Jack Holt and Jim Davis. The film was released on August 15, 1949, by Republic Pictures.

== Plot ==
Pop "Brimstone" Courteen (Walter Brennan) and his sons, Nick, Luke and Bud, run a ranch outside the town of Gunsight, and are none too happy about the recent arrival of homesteaders in the area. Determined to cut off the interlopers' supplies, the Courteens rob incoming stagecoaches and even the local bank. But things change when a U.S. marshal (Rod Cameron) arrives in town to investigate, and Bud falls in love with one of the hated homesteaders.

== Cast ==
- Rod Cameron as Johnny Tremaine
- Lorna Gray as Molly Bannister
- Walter Brennan as Brimstone 'Pop' Courteen
- Forrest Tucker as Sheriff Henry McIntyre
- Jack Holt as Marshal Walter Greenslide
- Jim Davis as Nick Courteen
- James Brown as Bud Courteen
- Guinn "Big Boy" Williams as Deputy Art Benson
- Jack Lambert as Luke Courteen
- Will Wright as Martin Tredwell
- David Williams as Todd Bannister
- Harry Cheshire as Calvin Willis
- Hal Taliaferro as Dave Watts
- Herbert Rawlinson as Storekeeper
- Stanley Andrews as Edward Winslow
- Charlita as Chiquita
