= The Lost Zeppelin =

1929 sound film

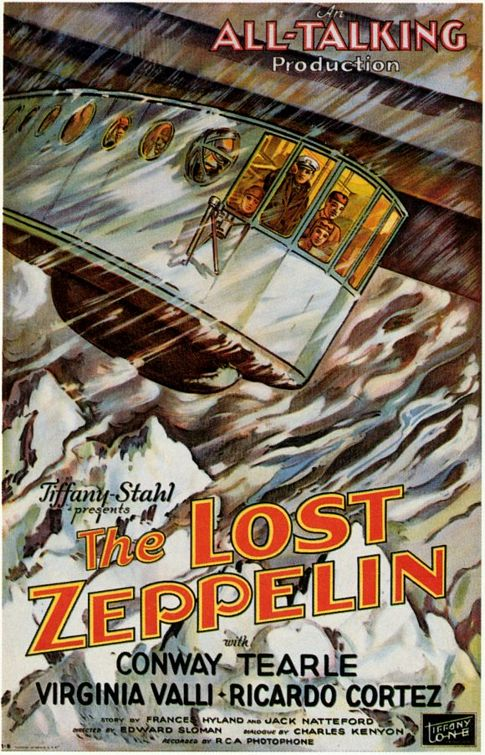
- Film poster
- Directed by: Edward Sloman
- Written by: Jack Natteford (story) (as John Francis Natteford); Frances Hyland (adaptation); Charles Kenyon (dialogue)
- Produced by: Tiffany-Stahl
- Starring: Conway Tearle; Virginia Valli; Ricardo Cortez
- Cinematography: Jackson Rose
- Edited by: Martin G. Cohn; W. Donn Hayes
- Music by: Meredith Willson
- Production company: Tiffany-Stahl Productions
- Distributed by: Tiffany Pictures
- Release date: December 20, 1929
- Running time: 8 reels

The Lost Zeppelin is a 1929 American sound adventure film directed by Edward Sloman and produced and distributed by Tiffany-Stahl. The film stars Conway Tearle, Virginia Valli, and Ricardo Cortez.

Tearle plays a navy officer modeled on U. S. Navy Commander Richard Evelyn Byrd, who was then a national aviation hero. Byrd made his own genuine Antarctic adventure film, With Byrd at the South Pole, during his South Pole Expedition 1928-1929.

== Plot ==
The film

At a banquet preceding his flight to the South Pole, Commander Donald Hall, a zeppelin commander in charge of the Explorer, learns that his wife, Miriam, whom he worships, requests a divorce. She is in love with Lieutenant Tom Armstrong, his best friend and partner in the flight. Hall agrees to grant the divorce after the flight.

When the zeppelin reaches the South Pole, a sudden gale causes it to crash, and the men divide up into search parties. An aircraft with room for only one survivor leads to a decision by Hall that Armstrong should be the one to be saved.

Armstrong is welcomed in Washington as the only survivor but finds that Miriam still loves her husband. Later, news comes of Hall's rescue and miraculous recovery, and he is happily reunited with his wife.

== Cast ==
- Conway Tearle as Commander Donald Hall
- Virginia Valli as Miriam Hall
- Ricardo Cortez as Tom Armstrong
- Duke Martin as Lieutenant Wallace
- Kathryn McGuire as Nancy
- Winter Hall as Mr. Wilson

uncredited

- Richard Cramer as Radio Announcer
- Ervin Nyiregyhazi as Pianist
- William H. O'Brien as Radio Operator

== Production ==
The stagey early part of The Lost Zeppelin was dominated by a banquet scene and actors engaged in dialogue from static positions. The early sound equipment was difficult to use, and actors often had to deliver lines "on their marks", afraid to even turn their heads and lose microphone coverage. The "shoddy production" values described by aviation film historian Michael Paris in From the Wright Brothers to Top Gun: Aviation, Nationalism, and Popular Cinema (1995) were typical of the early sound film era.

The zeppelin in The Lost Zeppelin is a combination of stock footage of flights, the use of miniatures, and a mockup of the gondola. Although the special effects were satisfactory for the era, aviation film historian James H. Farmer in Celluloid Wings: The Impact of Movies on Aviation (1984) considered The Lost Zeppelin had "disappointing special effects and triangular plot."

== Reception ==
Mordaunt Hall in his review for The New York Times gave a mostly negative review of The Lost Zeppelin, "Presumably the producers of "The Lost Zeppelin," an audible pictorial melodrama now at the Gaiety, do not believe in a very high order of intelligence among cinema audiences, for the best that can be said of the film is that it appears to have been fashioned with a view to appealing to boys from 8 to 10 years of age. Several such youngsters were at the first showing of this offering last Saturday afternoon, and they became volubly enthusiastic over the Antarctic blizzard, the far from impressive airship, the artificial ice fields and the clumsily designed chain of incidents."

== Preservation ==
The Lost Zeppelin is listed as "no holdings located in archives" in the Library of Congress database. The film has also been released on Alpha DVD. The Internet Archive has a digitized copy available for download.

== See also ==
- List of early sound feature films (1926–1929)
- With Byrd at the South Pole (1929)
- Dirigible (1931)
