= Ande Lamb =

American screenwriter (1901–1961)

- Born: Robert Anderson Bursley; September 12, 1901; New Orleans, Louisiana, U.S.
- Died: April 4, 1961 (aged 59); Los Angeles, California, U.S.
- Resting place: Holy Cross Cemetery
- Occupation: Screenwriter
- Years active: 1939–1960
- Spouse(s): Susan Gillett Lewis (m. 1926; div. ?); Ruth C. Anderson (m. 1943; div. 1952 or 1953)
- Children: 1

Ande Lamb (born Robert Anderson Bursley Jr.; September 12, 1901 – March 16, 1961) was an American film and television writer, producer and director, active in the 1940s—primarily in B-films and serials—and 50s, when he penned numerous Hopalong Cassidy and Cisco Kid episodes. He was also the principal writer on Craig Kennedy, Criminologist.

== Early life and career ==
Born in New Orleans on September 12, 1901, Lamb was the son of Robert Anderson Bursley Sr. and Edna M. Lamb, a musically and theatrically inclined New Orleans native who had until recently taught at the Fifth Ward School No. 1 in Ama, Louisiana. Following her premature death in 1909, Bursley Sr. married Elizabeth "Bessie" Surcouf in 1911.

Bursley Jr.'s professional transition to "Ande Lamb" was first noted in 1937, regarding a collaboration with director Spencer Bennet on a projected—but, evidently, never realized—6-picture package of films based on racing driver Pete DePaolo's autobiography, Wall Smacker. In August 1939, the Belasco Theater in downtown Los Angeles played host to the premiere of Lamb's Thank Your Lucky Stars, touted as a satire of Hollywood, and reportedly slotted for a Broadway engagement that fall. Such predictions proved overly optimistic, as the production was dealt a resounding thumbs-down by critics and audiences alike.

Given a mixed but markedly warmer reception was Lamb's murder mystery Honeymoon Ghost, staged in 1944 at the Hampshire Playhouse in Los Angeles, and starring Maria Riva (then billed as Maria Manton) While deeming the plot "complicated and slightly far-fetched," LA Times reviewer Katherine Von Blon went on to praise Lamb's "clearly-limned characters," adding that "many of the situations were rife with suspense and certain comic implication."

== Personal life and death ==
The first of Lamb's marriages, both of which ended in divorce, came in February 1926, preceding by more than a decade the transition from Bursley to his better-known pen name. The bride was Susan Gillett Lewis, and their union produced one child, a daughter, Diane Lewis Bursley. In October 1943, Lamb married actress Ruth C. Anderson. On December 16, 1952, the Los Angeles Mirror reported that Superior Court Judge William McKay had, that day, granted Ruth Lamb an interlocutory divorce decree, based on testimony that Mr. Lamb was, as the Mirror phrased it, "a lion as a husband," impacting both privacy and safety via alternating bouts of eavesdropping and beatings.

On March 16, 1961, Lamb, aged 60, suffered a fatal heart attack in Hollywood. His remains are interred at Holy Cross Cemetery in Culver City.

Not quite six and a half years later, Lamb's only child, the former Diane Bursley—having since become, respectively, Mrs. Robert Armstrong and Mrs. David Miller—died even more prematurely, at age 39 of undisclosed causes, survived by her husband and son.

== Filmography ==
=== Films ===
Year	Film	Credit	Notes
1942	Police Bullets	Story, screenplay	
1942	War Dogs	Original story	
1943	Harvest Melody	Story	
1944	Follow the Leader	Story	"East of the Bowery"
1944	Mystery of the River Boat	Story; adaptation	
1944	Riders of the Santa Fe	Original screenplay	
1945	Jungle Queen	Original screenplay	
1945	Brenda Starr, Reporter	Original screenplay	(As Andy Lamb)
1945	The Master Key	Screenplay	
1945	Trouble Chasers	Original story; screenplay	
1945	Renegades of the Rio Grande	Original screenplay	
1945	Jungle Raiders	Original screenplay	(As Andy Lamb)
1945	Who's Guilty?	Original screenplay	
1946	Moon Over Montana	Dialogue director	
1946	Hop Harrigan America's Ace of the Airways	Original screenplay	
1946	West of the Alamo	Dialogue director	
1946	Lone Star Moonlight	Original story; screenplay	
1947	Unexpected Guest	Screenplay	
1947	Hoppy's Holiday	Screenplay	
1947	The Case of the Baby Sitter	Screenplay	Short subject (As Andy Lamb)
1947	Mystery Range	Producer, director, writer	
1948	Strange Gamble	Writer	(Uncredited)
1950	The Texan Meets Calamity Jane	Producer, director, writer	

=== Television ===
Year	TV Series	Credit	Notes
1949	The Lone Ranger	Writer	3 Episodes
1952–53	Craig Kennedy, Criminologist	Writer	26 Episodes
1950–51, 1954–56	The Cisco Kid	Writer	3 Episodes; 7 Episodes
1952–54	Hopalong Cassidy	Writer	8 Episodes
1956	The Man Called X	Writer	1 Episode
1960	Death Valley Days	Writer	1 Episode
