= Geraldine Wall =

American actress

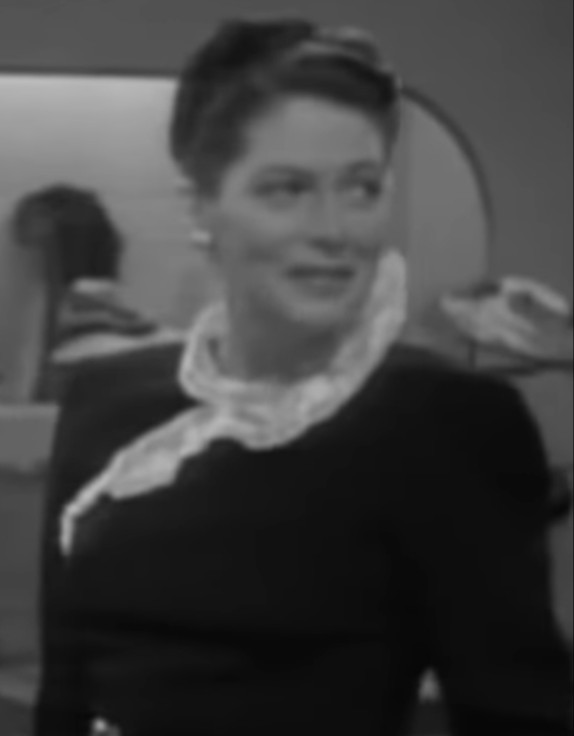
- Wall in Love Laughs at Andy Hardy (1946)
- Born: June 24, 1907; New York City, U.S.
- Died: June 22, 1970 (aged 62); Woodland Hills, Los Angeles, U.S.
- Resting place: Holy Cross Cemetery, Culver City, Los Angeles
- Occupation: Actress
- Years active: 1927–1970
- Spouse: Franklin Day (m. 1936; div. 1937)

Geraldine Wall (June 24, 1907 – June 22, 1970) was an American actress who had numerous stage, film and television credits. Her career involved mainly character roles but encompassed a wide range of different acting parts.

== Early life ==
Wall was born in New York City and grew up there. Actress Lucille Wall was her sister.

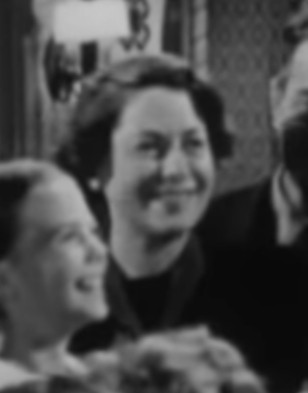
Geraldine Wall as Mrs. Wexford in The Green Promise (1949)

== Acting career ==
Wall became attracted to show business at an early age, and while still in her teens, she began pursuing a career as an actress, with roles on Broadway where she made her stage debut at 15 in The Love Nest at the Comedy Theatre. After success in other minor roles, including romantic comedies, Little Accident (1928), Blind Mice (1930), Child of Manhattan (1932) and Domino (1932). She was also in the cast of the drama, Heat Lightning (1933) and the musical Merrily We Roll Along (1934).

After marriage and divorce, Wall resumed her career as an actress in Hollywood at the age of 30, Her first roles were uncredited and not until Winged Victory (1944) did Wall receive an on-screen credit, albeit far down in the "other" players. She received credit in Charlie Chan's Meeting At Midnight (1944) series film.

Proving to be a versatile actress, Wall took on many different roles including working women, secretaries, mothers and wives, acting in 47 films. Although predominantly known from her drama, comedy and romance roles, she also was featured in a wide variety of genres including: mystery, crime, family, adventure, thriller, western, war, action, film-noir, musical, and biography, as well as dabbling in fantasy, history, horror, sport and even science-fiction films. Wall was the original choice for the role of Dolly Tate in the 1950 MGM film Annie Get Your Gun. When Betty Hutton replaced Judy Garland in the role of Annie Oakley, Benay Venuta took over the role of Dolly Tate.

With the dawn of television, like many other actors, Wall began working in the new medium in the 1950s. Finding not only recurring roles but a number of other "one-offs", she appeared in 17 television series, acting until 1970.

Wall's stage, screen and television career encompassed notable character roles including One Man's Way, The Song of Bernadette, Charlie Chan in Black Magic, The Fountainhead, Black Widow and Please Don't Eat the Daisies. She made six guest appearances on the popular series Perry Mason, starring Raymond Burr. Perhaps her most memorable role was as murderess Abigail E. Leeds in the 1957 episode "The Case of the Baited Hook."

She also made three appearances on The Dick Van Dyke Show TV series. Her final television appearance was in a 1970 episode of Here Come the Brides.

== Personal life ==
Wall married diplomat and financier Franklin "Wolfram" Day (his second marriage), on April 23, 1936, in Manhattan, but it ended in divorce on November 9, 1937, in Nevada.

== Death ==
Wall's death from pneumonia in 1970 occurred in Woodland Hills, Los Angeles just two days prior to her 63rd birthday. She was buried at the Holy Cross Cemetery, Culver City, Los Angeles.

== Filmography ==
=== Film credits ===
- The Song of Bernadette (1943) - Nun (uncredited)
- Black Magic (1944) - Harriet Green
- In the Meantime, Darling (1944) - Mrs. Sullivan (uncredited)
- Music for Millions (1944) - Minor Role (uncredited)
- Winged Victory (1944) - Mrs. Ross
- Keep Your Powder Dry (1945) - Judo Instructor (uncredited)
- The Clock (1945) - U.S.O. Receptionist (uncredited)
- The Valley of Decision (1945) - Kate Shannon
- Girls of the Big House (1945) - Head Matron Marsden
- A Letter for Evie (1946) - Red Cross Nurse (uncredited)
- The Madonna's Secret (1946) - Miss Joyce
- Janie Gets Married (1946) - Reporter (uncredited)
- Boys' Ranch (1946) - Mrs. Harper
- Love Laughs at Andy Hardy (1946) - Miss Geeves
- Born to Speed (1947) - Mrs. Randall
- High Barbaree (1947) - Mrs. Martha Brooke
- Blaze of Noon (1947) - Nurse (uncredited)
- Dark Delusion (1947) - Mrs. Rowland
- Unconquered (1947) - Mrs. Bitt (uncredited)
- Scudda Hoo! Scudda Hay! (1948) - Mrs. Lucy McGill (uncredited)
- B.F.'s Daughter (1948) - Miss Wall, Tom's War Time Secretary (uncredited)
- Homecoming (1948) - Head Nurse (uncredited)
- Green Grass of Wyoming (1948) - Nell McLaughlin
- Beyond Glory (1948) - Mrs. Daniels
- Alias Nick Beal (1949) - Martha Foster
- The Green Promise (1949) - Mrs. Wexford
- The Fountainhead (1949) - Woman (uncredited)
- Everybody Does It (1949) - Carol - Secretary (uncredited)
- The File on Thelma Jordon (1950) - Matron
- Paid in Full (1950) - Miss Ames Nurse (uncredited)
- Appointment with Danger (1950) - Mother Ambrose
- Where Danger Lives (1950) - Annie - Nurse (uncredited)
- A Life of Her Own (1950) - Hosiery Woman (uncredited)
- Mister 880 (1950) - Miss Gallagher (uncredited)
- By the Light of the Silvery Moon (1953) - Mrs. Emily Harris (uncredited)
- A Star Is Born (1954) - Esther's Neighbor (uncredited)
- Black Widow (1954) - Gwen Mills (uncredited)
- The Man in the Gray Flannel Suit (1956) - Miriam - Bernstein's Secretary (uncredited)
- Everything but the Truth (1956) - Woman at Lecture (uncredited)
- Crime of Passion (1957) - Justice of the Peace, Marriage Ceremony (uncredited)
- Designing Woman (1957) - Mrs. Hammerstein (uncredited)
- An Affair to Remember (1957) - Miss Webb (uncredited)
- Party Girl (1958) - Day matron (uncredited)
- Mardi Gras (1958) - Ann Harris
- Some Came Running (1958) - Mrs. Stevens (uncredited)
- This Earth Is Mine (1959) - Maria
- The Big Circus (1959) - Reporter (uncredited)
- Heller in Pink Tights (1960) - Mrs. Haddock - Madam (uncredited)
- Please Don't Eat the Daisies (1960) - Dr. Sprouk (uncredited)
- Let's Make Love (1960) - Miss Hansen, Wales' Secretary-Receptionist (uncredited)
- The Interns (1962) - Pharmacy Nurse Abby (uncredited)
- The Chapman Report (1962) - Secretary (uncredited)
- One Man's Way (1964) - Mae Michaels
- Shock Treatment (1964) - Asylum Matron on Bus (uncredited)
- Sylvia (1965) - Clerk at Private Hospital (uncredited)

=== Television credits ===
- Kraft Television Theatre (1951) - Edith
- The Lone Ranger (1952) - Clara Bentley
- Death Valley Days (1957) - Mrs. Peabody, "The Washington Elm"
- The Alfred Hitchcock Hour (1962) (Season 1 Episode 5: "Captive Audience") - Mrs. Hurley
- The Dick Van Dyke Show (1962-1964) - Mrs. Meehan / Miss Glasser
- Perry Mason (1959-1965) - Six appearances,
- in "The Case of the Baited Hook", Season 1, episode 14 - Abigail E. Leeds,
- in "The Case of the Petulant Partner", Season 2, episode 64 - Nell Gridley,
- in "The Case of the Blind Man's Bluff", Season 4, episode 114 - Mrs. Cartwright,
- in "The Case of the Promoter's Pillbox", Season 5, episode 152 - Mrs. Simms,
- in "The Case of the Decadent Dean", Season 7, episode 186 - Mrs. Perkins,
- in "The Case of the Wrathful Wraith", Season 9, episode 250 - Mrs. Stallman,
- Mannix (1968) - Season 2 Episode 03 "Pressure Point" - Norma
- Here Come the Brides (1970) - Mrs. Hobbs (final appearance)
