= Stepchild (film) =

1947 film directed by James Flood

- Directed by: James Flood
- Written by: Jules Levine; Karen DeWolf
- Produced by: Jerry Briskin; Leonard S. Picker
- Starring: Brenda Joyce; Donald Woods; Vivian Austin
- Cinematography: Jackson Rose
- Edited by: W. Donn Hayes; Alfred DeGaetano
- Music by: Mario Silva
- Production company: Producers Releasing Corporation
- Distributed by: Eagle-Lion Films
- Release date: June 7, 1947
- Running time: 70 minutes
- Country: United States
- Language: English

Stepchild is a 1947 American drama film directed by James Flood and starring Brenda Joyce, Donald Woods and Vivian Austin.

== Cast ==
- Brenda Joyce as Dale Bullock
- Donald Woods as Ken Bullock
- Vivian Austin as Millie Lynne
- Tommy Ivo as Jim Bullock
- Gregory Marshall as Tommy Bullock
- Griff Barnett as Burns
- James Millican as Brian Reed
- Selmer Jackson as Judge

== Bibliography ==
- Darby, William. Masters of Lens and Light: A Checklist of Major Cinematographers and Their Feature Films. Scarecrow Press, 1991.
