= She Gets Her Man (1945 film) =

1945 American comedy film directed by Erle C. Kenton

- Theatrical release poster
- Directed by: Erle C. Kenton
- Screenplay by: Warren Wilson; Clyde Bruckman; Ray Singer; Dick Chevillat
- Produced by: Warren Wilson
- Starring: Joan Davis; William Gargan; Leon Errol; Vivian Austin; Milburn Stone; Russell Hicks
- Cinematography: Jerome Ash
- Edited by: Paul Landres
- Production company: Universal Pictures
- Distributed by: Universal Pictures
- Release date: January 12, 1945
- Running time: 74 minutes
- Country: United States
- Language: English

She Gets Her Man is a 1945 American comedy film directed by Erle C. Kenton and written by Warren Wilson, Clyde Bruckman, Ray Singer and Dick Chevillat. The film stars Joan Davis, William Gargan, Leon Errol, Vivian Austin, Milburn Stone and Russell Hicks. The film was released on January 12, 1945, by Universal Pictures.

== Cast ==
- Joan Davis as Jane 'Pilky' Pilkington
- William Gargan as 'Breezy' Barton
- Leon Errol as Mulligan
- Vivian Austin as Maybelle Clark
- Milburn Stone as 'Tommy Gun' Tucker
- Russell Hicks as Mayor
- Donald MacBride as Henry Wright
- Paul Stanton as Dr. Bleaker
- Cy Kendall as Brodie
- Emmett Vogan as Hatch
- Eddie Acuff as Boze
- Virginia Sale as Phoebe
- Ian Keith as Oliver McQuestion
- Maurice Cass as Mr. Pudge
- Chester Clute as Charlie
- Arthur Loft as Waldron
- Sidney Miller as Boy
- Leslie Denison as Barnsdale
- Al Kikume as Joe
- Robert Allen as Band Leader / Singer
