= W. Donn Hayes =

American film editor

- Born: June 25, 1893; Brookston, Indiana, United States
- Died: May 6, 1973 (aged 79); Sun City, California, United States
- Other name: Donn Hayes
- Occupation: Editor
- Years active: 1915–1953 (film)

W. Donn Hayes (1893–1973) was an American film editor active from the 1910s to the 1950s. He worked for a number of Hollywood studios including MGM, Fox Film and Paramount. He was sometimes credited simply as Donn Hayes.

== Selected filmography ==
- The Girl of the Golden West (1915)
- Peck's Bad Boy (1921)
- Never the Twain Shall Meet (1925)
- Zander the Great (1925)
- The Carnival Girl (1926)
- A Harp in Hock (1927)
- Companionate Marriage (1928)
- The Chorus Kid (1928)
- Bare Knees (1928)
- San Francisco Nights (1928)
- The Head of the Family (1928)
- Hellship Bronson (1928)
- Turn Back the Hours (1928)
- The Rush Hour (1928)
- Times Square (1929)
- The Lost Zeppelin (1929)
- The Jazz Cinderella (1930)
- Ex-Flame (1930)
- The Bad One (1930)
- Puttin' On the Ritz (1930)
- Night Life in Reno (1931)
- Forgotten Women (1931)
- The She-Wolf (1931)
- A Fool's Advice (1932)
- The Dude Ranger (1934)
- Peck's Bad Boy (1934)
- Frontier Marshal (1934)
- Every Night at Eight (1935)
- When a Man's a Man (1935)
- The Cowboy Millionaire (1935)
- Tarzan Escapes (1936)
- Espionage (1937)
- Between Two Women (1937)
- The Thirteenth Chair (1937)
- Escape by Night (1937)
- Stablemates (1938)
- The Girl of the Golden West (1938)
- The Shopworn Angel (1938)
- Tell No Tales (1939)
- Stronger Than Desire (1939)
- The Ice Follies of 1939 (1939)
- Broadway Serenade (1939)
- Dancing Co-Ed (1939)
- Diamond Frontier (1940)
- South to Karanga (1940)
- When the Lights Go On Again (1944)
- The Missing Corpse (1945)
- The Man Who Walked Alone (1945)
- Hollywood and Vine (1945)
- Down Missouri Way (1946)
- Bury Me Dead (1947)
- Stepchild (1947)
- Philo Vance's Secret Mission (1947)
- Philo Vance's Gamble (1947)
- Born to Speed (1947)
- The Gas House Kids in Hollywood (1947)
- Assigned to Danger (1948)
- Invasion, U.S.A. (1952)
- Torpedo Alley (1952)
- Mesa of Lost Women (1953)
- Paris Model (1953)

== Bibliography ==
- Smith, David L. Hoosiers in Hollywood. Indiana Historical Society, 2006.
