= Jackson Rose =

American cinematographer (1886–1956)

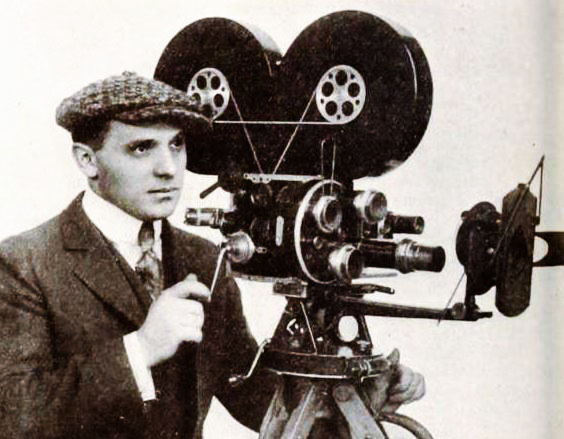
- Rose in 1918
- Born: October 29, 1886; Chicago, Illinois, United States
- Died: September 23, 1956 (aged 69); Los Angeles, California, United States
- Occupation: Cinematographer
- Years active: 1914-1950

Jackson Rose (1886–1956) was an American cinematographer. He shot more than a hundred and fifty short and feature films during his career. He began his career at the Chicago-based Essanay Pictures, then worked for Universal Pictures for much of the 1920s. He also shot films for a variety other studios including Tiffany Pictures, MGM, Columbia Pictures and Warner Brothers

== Selected filmography ==
- The Slim Princess (1915)
- The Prince of Graustark (1916)
- Captain Jinks of the Horse Marines (1916)
- Skinner's Dress Suit (1917)
- The Trufflers (1917)
- The Mutiny of the Elsinore (1920)
- Burning Daylight (1920)
- Big Game (1921)
- The Marriage of William Ashe (1921)
- Paid Back (1922)
- The Married Flapper (1922)
- His Last Race (1923)
- The Dangerous Age (1923)
- The Night Message (1924)
- The Whispered Name (1924)
- Behind the Curtain (1924)
- Excitement (1924)
- The Sunset Trail (1924)
- Young Ideas (1924)
- The Dangerous Blonde (1924)
- Big Timber (1924)
- The Measure of a Man (1924)
- Smouldering Fires (1925)
- Ridin' Pretty (1925)
- The Storm Breaker (1925)
- Straight Through (1925)
- Up the Ladder (1925)
- The Mystery Club (1926)
- The Old Soak (1926)
- The Midnight Sun (1926)
- The Beautiful Cheat (1926)
- Alias the Deacon (1927)
- Held by the Law (1927)
- Cheating Cheaters (1927)
- Lingerie (1928)
- Love Me and the World Is Mine (1928)
- We Americans (1928)
- The Foreign Legion (1928)
- The Grip of the Yukon (1928)
- Green Grass Widows (1928)
- Midstream (1929)
- Girl on the Barge (1929)
- Painted Faces (1929)
- The College Coquette (1929)
- The Lost Zeppelin (1929)
- The Girl from Woolworth's (1929)
- Troopers Three (1930)
- A Lady Surrenders (1930)
- The Swellhead (1930)
- Once a Gentleman (1930)
- Seed (1931)
- Strictly Dishonorable (1931)
- Reckless Living (1931)
- Texas Gun Fighter (1932)
- Law and Order (1932)
- Radio Patrol (1932)
- Don't Bet on Love (1933)
- Phantom Thunderbolt (1933)
- The Three Wise Guys (1936)
- Mama Steps Out (1937)
- Northwest Rangers (1942)
- The Unknown Guest (1943)
- Trocadero (1944)
- Dillinger (1945)
- Main Street After Dark (1945)
- Fear (1946)
- Stepchild (1947)
- Born to Speed (1947)
- Out of the Blue (1947)
- Philo Vance's Secret Mission (1947)
- Philo Vance's Gamble (1947)
- Philo Vance Returns (1947)
- The Checkered Coat (1948)
- Bungalow 13 (1948)
- I Cheated the Law (1949)
- Destination Murder (1950)
- The Great Plane Robbery (1950)
- Experiment Alcatraz (1950)

== Bibliography ==
- Bruce Babington & Charles Barr. The Call of the Heart: John M. Stahl and Hollywood Melodrama. Indiana University Press, 2018.
