= The Master Key (1945 serial) =

1945 film by Ray Taylor, Lewis D. Collins

- Directed by: Lewis D. Collins; Ray Taylor
- Written by: Jack Natteford; Dwight V. Babcock; Joseph O'Donnell; George H. Plympton; Ande Lamb
- Produced by: Morgan Cox
- Starring: Milburn Stone; Jan Wiley; Dennis Moore; Addison Richards; Byron Foulger; Maris Wrixon; Lash Larue
- Cinematography: Maury Gertsman; William A. Sickner
- Edited by: Irving Birnbaum; Jack Dolan; Ace Herman; Alvin Todd; Edgar Zane
- Distributed by: Universal Pictures
- Release date: April 24, 1945
- Running time: 13 chapters (226 minutes)
- Country: United States
- Language: English

The Master Key is a 1945 Universal movie serial, directed by Lewis D. Collins and Ray Taylor. It starred Milburn Stone, Dennis Moore, and Byron Foulger. This serial also featured the screen debut of future western film star Lash LaRue.

== Plot ==
Nazi spies, led by the mysterious "Master Key", kidnap Professor Henderson in order to acquire his "Orotron machine" which is capable of extracting gold from sea water. FBI agent Tom Brant, aided by reporter Janet Lowe and Detective Lt. Jack Ryan, attempt to rescue him and crack the Nazi spy ring.

== Cast ==
- Milburn Stone as FBI Agent Tom Brant
- Jan Wiley as Janet Lowe, a reporter
- Dennis Moore as Detective Lt. Jack Ryan
- Addison Richards as Gerhard Doenitz, alias Garret Donahue, private investigator and Nazi agent
- Byron Foulger as Professor Elwood Henderson
- Maris Wrixon as Dorothy Newton/The Master Key
- Sarah Padden as Aggie
- George Lynn as Herman, the "Spearpoint Heavy" (chief henchman)
- Russell Hicks as Police Chief Michael J. O'Brien
- Roland Varno as Arnold "Hoff" Hoffman, alias M-3
- Lash LaRue as Migsy, a street urchin. This was La Rue's screen debut.
- Jerry Shane as Dan, boys' club member
- Neyle Morrow as Spike, boys' club member
- John Eldredge as Walter Stark, alias M-6

== Production ==
=== Stunts ===
- Carl Mathews
- David Sharpe
- Tom Steele
- Ken Terrell
- Dale Van Sickel

== Chapter titles ==
1. Trapped by Flames
2. Death Turns the Wheel
3. Ticket to Disaster
4. Drawbridge Danger
5. Runaway Car
6. Shot Down
7. Death on the Dial
8. Bullet Serenade
9. On Stage for Murder
10. Fatal Masquerade
11. Crash Curve
12. Lightning Underground
13. The Last Key

_{Source:}

== See also ==
- List of film serials
- List of film serials by studio

Preceded by Jungle Queen (1945)	Universal Serial; The Master Key (1945)	Succeeded by Secret Agent X-9 (1945)
