= Rod Cameron (actor) =

Canadian film, television actor (1910–1983)

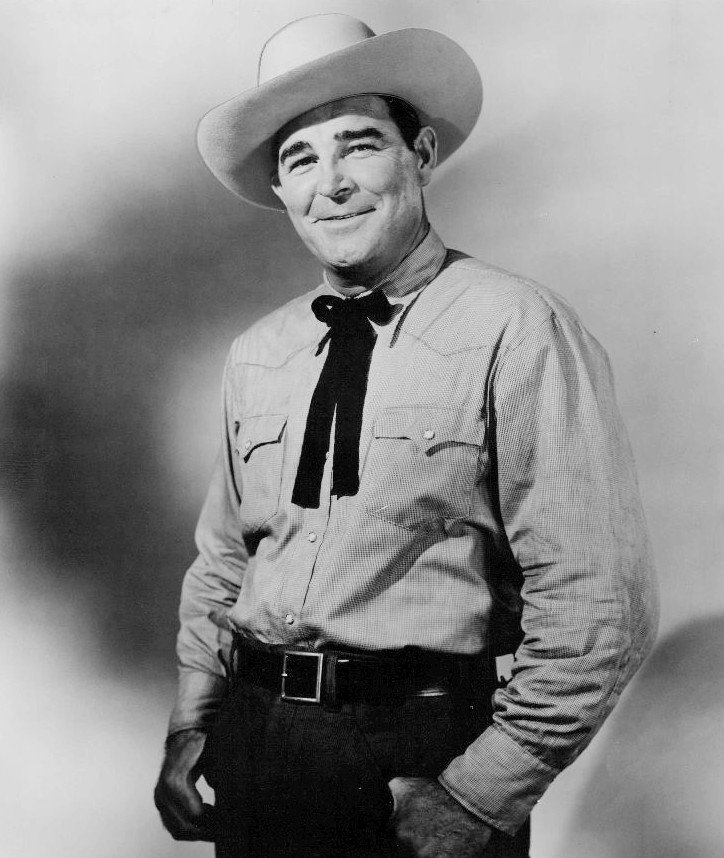
- Cameron as Rod Blake in State Trooper, 1957.
- Born: Nathan Roderick Cox; December 7, 1910; Calgary, Alberta, Canada
- Died: December 21, 1983 (aged 73); Gainesville, Georgia, U.S.
- Occupation: Actor
- Years active: 1939–1978
- Spouses: Doris C Stanford (June 27, 1936 - February 13, 1942) (divorced, 1 child); Toni St. John (May 17, 1944 - January 5, 1945) (annulled, 1 child); Angela Louisa Alves-Lico (December 7, 1950 - July 26, 1954) (divorced, 1 child); Dorothy Eveleigh (the mother of his previous wife, Angela Louisa-Lico) (1960 - December 21, 1983 (his death))
- Children: 3

Rod Cameron (born Nathan Roderick Cox; December 8, 1912 – December 21, 1983) was a Canadian film and television actor whose career extended from the 1930s to the 1970s. He appeared in horror, war, action and science fiction movies but is best remembered for his many Westerns.

== Early years ==
Cameron was born in Calgary, Alberta, Canada, and grew up in New Jersey. He played on his high school basketball team and on a semi-professional football team. Despite those activities and others such as swimming and playing ice hockey, he couldn't join the Royal Canadian Mounted Police in Canada as a young man because he failed the physical examination. Cameron moved to Los Angeles in the 1930s to work as a sandhog on the Metropolitan Water tunnels.

== Films ==
Cameron started out as a stuntman and was a body double for Buck Jones. He became a bit player for Paramount Pictures as well as a stand-in for Fred MacMurray. His early films include Heritage of the Desert with Donald Woods and Russell Hayden, Rangers of Fortune with Fred MacMurray, North West Mounted Police and Henry Aldrich for President with Jimmy Lydon. He also played bit roles at Universal Pictures, including in If I Had My Way, starring Bing Crosby and Gloria Jean. He appeared in a horror film The Monster and the Girl and played Jesse James in The Remarkable Andrew for Paramount.

In 1943, Cameron gained star status in action serials for Republic Pictures. As crime-busting federal agent Rex Bennett, Cameron battled enemy terrorists in 15 weekly episodes of G-Men vs. the Black Dragon. He was already working in another serial when audience reaction to Black Dragon made him a hit. He appeared in another Rex Bennett adventure, Secret Service in Darkest Africa, with Cameron again battling against Axis agents.

When cowboy star Johnny Mack Brown left Universal Pictures for Monogram Pictures, Cameron replaced him as Universal's Western series star. Universal soon gave him straight character roles in feature films, including Salome, Where She Danced and River Lady both co-starring fellow Canadian Yvonne De Carlo.

During World War II Cameron played in Commandos Strike at Dawn and played a US Marine in Wake Island (1942) and Gung Ho! (1943).

Universal reorganized as Universal-International and downsized its activities in 1947, leaving Cameron and other contract players unemployed. He was hired by Monogram Pictures for a long string of outdoor action pictures. In 1948, he starred in Panhandle (a movie with a script co-written by Blake Edwards) for Allied Artists.

In 1949, Cameron appeared with Bonita Granville in the comedy film Strike It Rich. He then appeared in many Westerns and other films for Republic Pictures including Santa Fe Passage (1955), and later The Gun Hawk (1963), Requiem for a Gunfighter (1965) and The Bounty Killer (1965).

Cameron traveled to Europe in 1964 to play the lead in Spaghetti Westerns such as Bullets Don't Argue (1964) and Bullet in the Flesh (1965). He later appeared in such films as The Last Movie (1971), Evel Knievel (1971) and Psychic Killer (1975).

== Television ==
Cameron starred in three syndicated television series: City Detective (1953–1955), State Trooper (1956–1959), and the Coronado 9 (1960–1961). In City Detective, Cameron appeared as the tough New York City police Lieutenant Bart Grant. In State Trooper, a 1950s-style Western-themed crime drama, Cameron starred as Lieutenant Rod Blake of the Nevada State Police. In Coronado 9, set in the San Diego area, Cameron appeared as Dan Adams, a private detective.

Hal Erickson, in his book, Syndicated Television: The First Forty Years, 1947–1987, cited Cameron's business sense in confining his work in TV series to syndication: "A canny businessman, Cameron knew that his City Detective residuals wouldn't have been as fat had a major television network been claiming a percentage of the action, and as a result the actor vowed to remain in syndication for the rest of his TV career. By 1960, Cameron was drawing over $200,000 per annum in residuals [from his three syndicated programs]..."

Cameron himself guest starred in many Westerns, including six appearances on NBC's Laramie, with John Smith and Robert Fuller. In "Drifter's Gold" (November 29, 1960), Cameron plays Tom Bedloe, an outlaw who has started the rumor of a nearby gold strike. When series lead Slim Sherman, played by John Smith, comes to Laramie to buy supplies, he finds the town nearly deserted and must pretend to be an outlaw to survive. Meanwhile, Bedloe is looking for Marcie Benson, the daughter he has never seen, played by Judi Meredith. Gregory Walcott plays Duke, Bedloe's partner in crime.

In another Laramie episode, "Broken Honor" (April 9, 1963), Cameron and Peggy McCay portray Roy and Martha Halloran, a farm couple who stumbles upon $30,000 in money found inside a strong box on their property. The loot had been seized in a stagecoach heist and hidden away for later retrieval. Roy, who is reliant on a wheelchair, insists on keeping the money until Jess Harper arrives amid grave danger to all of their lives from the bandits searching about for the missing money. One of the bandits is played by Don "Red" Barry, best remembered from the 1940 film Adventures of Red Ryder. Cameron also guest starred in the NBC's Western Bonanza in 1966: he portrayed Curtis Wade in the two-part episode "Ride The Wind". Cameron also guest starred in season 6 episode 18 of Western TV series "The Tales of Wells Fargo".

Cameron guest starred in such dramatic series as Crossroads, in which he portrayed Dr. Ervin Seale in the 1956 episode "Deadly Fear." He guest starred too on CBS's Perry Mason, with Raymond Burr, as defendant Grover Johnson in the 1963 episode, "The Case of the Bouncing Boomerang." He continued to work in motion pictures and television into the 1970s. He appeared in season 2 of James Garner's NBC detective series, The Rockford Files. Cameron also appeared in two episodes of ADAM-12 in 1975.

== Comic book ==
Cameron's Western persona was popular enough that it attracted a comic book deal with Fawcett Publications. The Rod Cameron Western series ran from February 1950 to April 1953, ending with issue No. 20. As seen in issue No. 17 (Oct. 1952), the comic book featured two Rod Cameron stories, plus a one page humorous strip featuring the character Ambling Andy, and a story featuring Sam the Sheriff.

== Personal life and death ==
Cameron was married five times. He married his second wife, Angela Alves-Lico, in 1950. They divorced in 1954. In a seemingly strange turn of events, he then moved in with her mother, actress Dorothy Alves-Lico (née Dorothy Eveleigh) under the guise of him allowing Angela & their child to stay in their home with him moving into the home of his former mother-in-law "just until he got his own apartment". They ended up getting married in an even stranger turn of events in 1960 though they kept the marriage a secret until 1961.After that, he met with a woman at a bar in 1962 and had two kids, and when Dorothy Alves-Lico found out, she filed for divorce in December of 1962. He married the woman in January of 1963, and after that they filed for divorce just two months later. In 1970, he met Ariana Volpian at a pay phone and he took her home. The next year, they got married and had five children. After he lost money in a bad stock, Ariana filed for separation.There have been rumors he had another child in 1967. Director William Witney publicly acclaimed Cameron as the "most chivalrous" man that he had ever seen.

In the 1970s, Cameron became involved with efforts to treat alcoholism. He was active in the Alcoholism Council of San Fernando Valley in Van Nuys, California, and he spoke to groups about problems related to alcoholism.

In his later years, he lived on Lake Lanier in northern Georgia. After an extended battle with disease (unnamed), Cameron died in a hospital in nearby Gainesville, aged 73.

He was posthumously awarded a star on the Hollywood Walk of Fame.

== Selected filmography ==
- Heritage of the Desert (1939) - Cowhand (uncredited)
- The Quarterback (1940) - Tex
- North West Mounted Police (1940) - Corporal Underhill
- Christmas in July (1940) - Dick
- Life with Henry (1940) - Bill Van Dusen
- The Monster and the Girl (1941) - Sam Daniels
- Buy Me That Town (1941) - Gerard
- Henry Aldrich for President (1941) - Ed Calkins
- The Night of January 16th (1941) - Attorney Polk's Assistant
- No Hands on the Clock (1941) - Tom Reed
- Pacific Blackout (1941) - Pilot
- The Remarkable Andrew (1942) - Jesse James
- True to the Army (1942) - Private O'Toole
- Priorities on Parade (1942) - Stage Manager
- Wake Island (1942) - Captain Pete Lewis
- The Forest Rangers (1942) - Jim Lawrence
- Commandos Strike at Dawn (1942) - Pastor
- G-Men vs. the Black Dragon (1943, Serial) - Agent Rex Bennett
- Honeymoon Lodge (1943) - Big Boy Carson
- Secret Service in Darkest Africa (1943, Serial) - Rex Bennett
- The Kansan (1943) - Kelso
- Riding High (1943) - Sam Welch
- Gung Ho! (1943) - Private Rube Tedrow
- Boss of Boomtown (1944) - Steve Hazard
- Trigger Trail (1944) - Clint Farrel
- Mrs. Parkington (1944) - Al Swann
- Riders of the Santa Fe (1944) - Matt Conway
- The Old Texas Trail (1944) - Jim Wiley, posing as Rawhide Carney
- Salome, Where She Danced (1945) - Jim
- Beyond the Pecos (1945) - Lew Remington
- Swing Out, Sister (1945) - Geoffrey Cabot
- Renegades of the Rio Grande (1945) - Buck Emerson
- Frontier Gal (1945) - Jonathan Hart
- The Runaround (1946) - Eddie J. Kildane
- Pirates of Monterey (1947) - Captain Phillip Kent
- Panhandle (1948) - John Sands
- River Lady (1948) - Dan Corrigan
- The Plunderers (1948) - John Drum
- Belle Starr's Daughter (1948) - Bob 'Bitter Creek' Yauntis
- Strike It Rich (1948) - Duke Massey
- Stampede (1949) - Mike McCall
- Brimstone (1949) - Johnny Tremaine
- Dakota Lil (1950) - Harve Logan / Kid Curry
- Stage to Tucson (1950) - Grif Holbrook
- Short Grass (1950) - Steve Llewellyn
- Oh! Susanna (1951) - Captain Webb Calhoun
- Cavalry Scout (1951) - Kirby Frye
- The Sea Hornet (1951) - Gunner McNeil
- Fort Osage (1952) - Tom Clay
- Wagons West (1952) - Jeff Curtis
- The Jungle (1952) - Steve Bentley
- Woman of the North Country (1952) - Kyle Ramlo
- Ride the Man Down (1952) - Will Ballard
- San Antone (1953) - Carl Miller
- The Steel Lady (1953) - Mike Monahan
- Southwest Passage (1954) - Edward Fitzpatrick Beale
- Hell's Outpost (1954) - Tully Gibbs
- Santa Fe Passage (1955) - Jess Griswold
- Double Jeopardy (1955) - Marc Hill
- Headline Hunters (1955) - Hugh 'Woody' Woodruff
- The Fighting Chance (1955) - Bill Binyon
- Passport to Treason (1955) - Mike O'Kelly
- Yaqui Drums (1956) - Webb Dunham
- Spoilers of the Forest (1957) - Boyd Caldwell
- Escapement (1958) - Jeff Keenan
- The Man Who Died Twice (1958) - William 'Bill' Brennon
- Alfred Hitchcock Presents (1960) (Season 6 Episode 13: "The Man Who Found the Money") - Mr. Newsome
- Laramie (1961 episode "The Last Journey") - John Cole
- The Gun Hawk (1963) - Sheriff Ben Corey
- Bullets Don't Argue (1964) - Pat Garrett
- Bullet in the Flesh (1964) - Nathaniel Masters
- Requiem for a Gunfighter (1965) - Dave McCloud
- The Bounty Killer (1965) - Johnny Liam
- Winnetou and Old Firehand (1966) - Old Firehand
- Evel Knievel (1971) - Charlie Knesson
- The Last Movie (1971) - Pat Garrett
- Alias Smith and Jones (1972) – Sheriff Grimly in S2:E19, "The Biggest Game in the West"
- Psychic Killer (1975) - Dr. Commanger
