= Boss of Boomtown =

1944 film by Ray Taylor

- Directed by: Ray Taylor
- Written by: William Lively
- Starring: Rod Cameron; Tom Tyler; Fuzzy Knight; Vivian Austin
- Cinematography: William Sickner
- Edited by: Ted J. Kent
- Music by: Johnny Marvin
- Production company: Universal Pictures Company, Inc.
- Distributed by: Universal Pictures Company, Inc.
- Release date: May 26, 1944
- Running time: 58 minutes
- Country: United States

Boss of Boomtown is a 1944 Western film directed by Ray Taylor. It stars Rod Cameron, Tom Tyler and Fuzzy Knight.

== Cast ==
- Rod Cameron as Sgt. Steve Hazard
- Tom Tyler as Sgt. Jim Ward
- Fuzzy Knight as Corp. Chatter T. Boxie
- Vivian Austin as Dale Starr
- Ray Whitley as Sgt. Clark
- Jack Ingram as Sam Ridgeway
- Robert Barron as Norman Brett
- Marie Austin as Minerva Sawyer
- Max Wagner as Sgt. Dunne
- Sam Flint as Blaine Cornwall

== See also ==
- List of American films of 1944
