= The Gun Hawk =

1963 film by Edward Ludwig

- Directed by: Edward Ludwig
- Screenplay by: Jo Heims
- Story by: Richard Bernstein; Max Steeber
- Produced by: Richard Bernstein
- Starring: Rory Calhoun; Rod Cameron; Ruta Lee; Rod Lauren
- Cinematography: Paul Vogel
- Edited by: Rudi Feld
- Music by: Jimmie Haskell
- Color process: Color by Deluxe
- Production company: Bern-Field Productions
- Distributed by: Allied Artists Pictures
- Release date: August 28, 1963
- Running time: 92 minutes
- Country: United States
- Language: English

The Gun Hawk is a 1963 American Western film directed by Edward Ludwig and starring Rory Calhoun, Rod Cameron, Ruta Lee and Rod Lauren.

== Plot ==
Gunslinger Rory Calhoun dispenses his own brand of justice in this action-packed Western adventure co-starring Rod Cameron and Ruta Lee. It has been three years since gunfighter Blaine Madden visited his hometown. So when he warns the Sully brothers to stop harassing the town drunk, they shoot the old man dead, not realizing he’s Madden’s father. Killing them both, Madden is badly wounded by the sheriff but escapes to an outlaw haven where the law fears to tread and prepares what may be his last stand.

== Cast ==
- Rory Calhoun as Blaine Madden
- Rod Cameron as Sheriff Ben Corey
- Ruta Lee as Marleen
- Rod Lauren as 'Reb' Roan
- Morgan Woodward as Deputy 'Mitch' Mitchell
- Robert J. Wilke as Johnny Flanders
- John Litel as Drunk - Madden's father
- Jody Daniels as Tommy
- Rod Whelan as Blackjack
- Rodolfo Hoyos Jr. as Miguel (as Rodolfo Hoyos)
- Lane Bradford as Joe Sully
- Natividad Vacío as Quid (as Natividad Vacio)
- Joan Connors as Roan's Woman
- Glenn Stensel as Luke Sully
- Gregg Barton as Henchman
- Frank Gardner as Henchman
- Harry Fleer as Curly
- Lee Bradley as Pancho

== Conception and production ==
Written by Jo Heims (known later for Play Misty for Me), The Gun Hawk was the final film directed by Edward Ludwig, whose nearly 50-year career spanned over 100 shorts, television episodes and features, including the John Wayne hits The Fighting Seabees, Wake of the Red Witch and Big Jim McLain.
