= Renegades of the Rio Grande =

1945 film

- Directed by: Howard Bretherton
- Screenplay by: Ande Lamb; Oliver Drake
- Produced by: Oliver Drake
- Starring: Rod Cameron; Eddie Dew; Jennifer Holt
- Cinematography: Maury Gertsman
- Edited by: Edward Curtiss
- Music by: Paul Sawtell
- Production company: Universal Pictures
- Distributed by: Universal Pictures
- Release date: 1 June 1945
- Running time: 57 minutes
- Country: United States
- Language: English

Renegades of the Rio Grande is a 1945 American Western film directed by Howard Bretherton and starring: Rod Cameron, Eddie Dew and Jennifer Holt. It was produced and distributed by Universal Pictures. Ande Lamb wrote the screenplay.

== Plot ==
A crooked financier and a corrupt sheriff conspire to steal land from ranchers in Oklahoma Territory for the purposes of a railroad right-of-way. A young lawyer, Clint Farrell, comes to the rescue with the aid of some fighting-mad ranchers.

== Cast ==
- Rod Cameron as Buck Emerson
- Eddie Dew as Ranger Cal Benedict
- Fuzzy Knight as Ranger Trigger Bidwell
- Jennifer Holt as Dolores Salezar
- Ray Whitley as Tex Henry
- The Bar-6 Cowboys as Singing ranch hands
- Glenn Strange as Bart Drummond
- Edmund Cobb as Karl Holbrook.

== Bibliography ==
- Drew, Bernard A. Motion Picture Series and Sequels: A Reference Guide. Routledge, 2013.
- Katchmer, George A. Eighty Silent Film Stars: Biographies and Filmographies of the Obscure to the Well Known. McFarland, 1991.
