= Woman of the North Country =

1952 film by Joseph Kane

- Theatrical release poster
- Directed by: Joseph Kane
- Screenplay by: Norman Reilly Raine
- Story by: Charles Marquis Warren; Prescott Chaplin
- Produced by: Joseph Kane
- Starring: Ruth Hussey; Rod Cameron; John Agar; Gale Storm
- Cinematography: Jack A. Marta
- Edited by: Richard L. Van Enger
- Music by: R. Dale Butts
- Production company: Republic Pictures
- Distributed by: Republic Pictures
- Release date: September 5, 1952
- Running time: 90 minutes
- Country: United States
- Language: English

Woman of the North Country is a 1952 American Western film directed by Joseph Kane and starring Ruth Hussey, Rod Cameron, John Agar and Gale Storm. The film was released on September 5, 1952, by Republic Pictures.

== Synopsis ==
In 1890, the Powells are the ironmasters of Minnesota. Although eldest son David inherited management of the family business, daughter Christine has the shrewdest business mind and conspires to take over. She is backed by their brother Steve, who recently masterminded a train robbery that ended in murder, and the local banker, John Mulholland, who hopes for Christine's love in return. Confident that her power play has not offended the visiting Henry S. Chapman of Pittsburgh, whose steel company is their biggest account, Christine smugly tells him she will extend the company's mining operations to the Mesabi area, which she plans to grab when the abandoned lease, owned by the deceased Professor Ramlo, runs out in two weeks. Her plans are altered when she discovers that Ramlo's son Kyle is working the claim. She sends Steve and his ruffian gang to intimidate Kyle's group by setting fires to their camp and engaging them in a nocturnal gun battle. Steve leaves behind a tell-tale cartridge from his German-made gun, which is found by the old Swede, Axel Nordlund, a family friend who works for Kyle. With the assistance of his sweetheart Cathy, Axel's daughter, Kyle determines that the ore on his property lies near the surface and is especially rich. To finance replacement of equipment destroyed in the fire, Kyle goes to Duluth to offer the Powells a partnership in his mine, but is sent away without an interview. He stubbornly waits, until he encounters Christine at the hotel where she is attending a party. Unaware that she is the company's real power, he explains his offer, while she pretends barely to understand. She then invites him into the party, where he makes a good impression on Mr. Chapman, but drops his guard by intimating to her that he possesses $20,000 to pay the lease. Later, in Kyle's darkened hotel room, Steve robs Kyle, but loses his gun in the skirmish. The next day, Kyle learns from a gunsmith that the unusual German gun belongs to Steve, and although he can believe Steve's involvement in the fires, gunfight and robbery, Kyle is reluctant to think that Christine is also involved, as Cathy suggests. When Christine snubs him, having achieved her objective, he is determined to get his money back, and follows when she rides out to warn Steve. However, the observant Christine lets him catch up, and in an angry exchange of words, she insists she is the kind of woman he has always wanted. He retaliates by forcing a kiss, saying she asked for it. After leaving her, Kyle pushes a boulder onto the cabin hideout of Steve's gang as they wait to ambush him, and then kills Steve in a shootout. Searching Steve's body for his stolen wallet, Kyle finds a wanted poster for the train robbery and making the connection, collects the $25,000 reward. With the money, he starts his mining company and Chapman contracts with him instead of the Powells. After Kyle develops an idea to use a steam-shovel for mining shallow ore deposits, his company flourishes, but Kyle, working long and hard, becomes vengeful. Seeing the Powells' empire declining, he leases property that blocks their wagon train right-of-way and destroys the ailing company. Neglected by Kyle, Cathy perceives that his need for revenge is fueled by insecurity over an infatuation with Christine. Meanwhile, Christine, in reduced circumstances, plans a revenge of her own with the loyal Mulholland, promising she will be with him when she succeeds. She woos Kyle by claiming newfound sincerity, and Kyle succumbs. During Kyle and Christine's European honeymoon, Mulholland replaces Axel, who quit, with Turner, who sees that production levels drop. Then, to distract the miners from their jobs, Mulholland sets up an alcoholic, O'Hara, with a saloon near Kyle's property. When Kyle returns, he fires Turner, doubles production to meet deadlines and bans the miners from the saloon. When the men, whose loyalty is really to Axel, grudgingly comply, O'Hara, at Christine's direction, repeatedly blocks the roads to town, causing shipment delays. Mulholland then offers Kyle a loan, using the Mesabi claim as collateral, to build railroad tracks from the mine to the Duluth docks, while Christine pretends to oppose over-expansion. Their psychological tactics work and Kyle builds the railroad. However, on the train's first run, three days before Kyle's note to Mulholland is due, O'Hara and his men dynamite a railroad trestle. Cathy sees them and recognizing O'Hara, tells Axel, who guesses that Mulholland and Christine are sabotaging Kyle. Meanwhile, Kyle makes brave plans to start over, but Christine triumphantly taunts him, admitting how she schemed for two years to take over his company. She says she is divorcing him to marry Mulholland, who will foreclose in forty-eight hours. Defeated, Kyle strikes her and returns to the mine, where Axel has convinced the men quickly to rebuild the trestle in time for Kyle to pay off Mulholland. Later, discussing the failed scheme with Mulholland, who she believes will always do as she bids, Christine says that she is returning to her husband. At a public assembly held in Kyle's honor, she begs her husband to return to her, confident that he will. Before Kyle can respond, Mulholland shoots her and as she dies she claims that she really loves Kyle. Finally free from Christine, Kyle reunites with Cathy and their future together looks bright.

== Cast ==
- Ruth Hussey as Christine Powell
- Rod Cameron as Kyle Ramlo
- John Agar as David Powell
- Gale Storm as Cathy Nordlund
- J. Carrol Naish as John Mulholland
- Jim Davis as Steve Powell
- Jay C. Flippen as Axel Nordlund
- Taylor Holmes as Andrew Dawson
- Barry Kelley as O'Hara
- Grant Withers as Henry S. Chapman
- Stephen Bekassy as Andre Duclos
- Howard Petrie as Rick Barton
- Hank Worden as Tom Gordon
- Virginia Brissac as Mrs. Dawson
