= The Daltons Ride Again =

1945 film by Ray Taylor

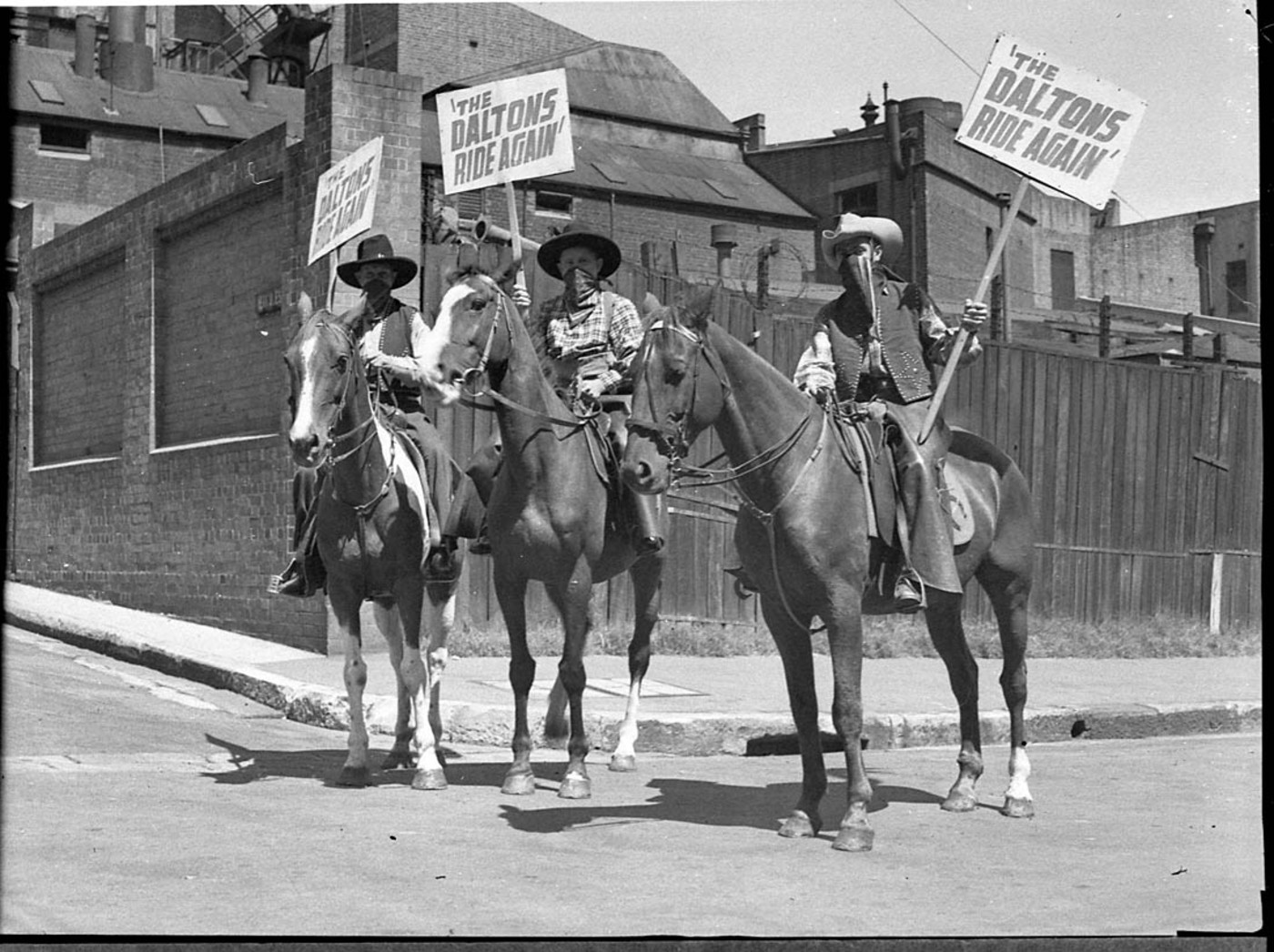
- Promotion for the film
- Directed by: Ray Taylor
- Screenplay by: Roy Chanslor; Paul Gangelin
- Produced by: Howard Welsch
- Starring: Alan Curtis; Lon Chaney Jr., Kent Taylor; Noah Beery Jr.
- Cinematography: Charles Van Enger
- Edited by: Paul Landres
- Music by: Frank Skinner
- Distributed by: Universal Pictures
- Release date: November 23, 1945
- Running time: 72 min.
- Country: United States
- Language: English

The Daltons Ride Again is a 1945 American Western film directed by Ray Taylor starring Alan Curtis, Lon Chaney Jr., Kent Taylor and Noah Beery Jr. The movie was released on November 23, 1945, by Universal Pictures and the supporting cast features Milburn Stone ("Doc" in the subsequent television series Gunsmoke) and Douglas Dumbrille.

== Cast ==
- Alan Curtis as Emmett Dalton, a Brother
- Lon Chaney Jr. as Grat Dalton, a Brother
- Kent Taylor as Bob Dalton, a Brother
- Noah Beery Jr. as Ben Dalton, a Brother
- Martha O'Driscoll as Mary Bohannon, Emmett's girlfriend
- Jess Barker as Jeff Colton
- Thomas Gomez as 'Professor' J. K. McKenna, the Town drunk
- John Litel as Mitchael J. 'Mike" Bohannon, the Newspaper editor
- Milburn Stone as Parker W. Graham, a Land developer / bad guy
- Walter Sande as Wilkins / bad guy
- Douglass Dumbrille as Sheriff Hoskins
- Stanley Andrews as Tex Walters, the Dalton's friend

== Critical reception ==
Critic John Howard Reid called it "a handsome little oater with good performances and a fine violent shootout as its climax."
