= The Bounty Killer (film) =

1965 film by Spencer Gordon Bennet

- Theatrical release poster
- Directed by: Spencer Gordon Bennet
- Screenplay by: Ruth Alexander; Leo Gordon
- Produced by: Alex Gordon
- Starring: Dan Duryea; Rod Cameron; Audrey Dalton; Richard Arlen; Buster Crabbe; Fuzzy Knight; Johnny Mack Brown
- Cinematography: Frederick E. West
- Edited by: Ronald Sinclair
- Music by: Ronald Stein
- Production company: Premiere Productions
- Distributed by: Embassy Pictures
- Release date: July 31, 1965
- Running time: 92 minutes
- Country: United States
- Language: English

The Bounty Killer is a 1965 American Technicolor and Techniscope Western film directed by Spencer Gordon Bennet, written by Ruth Alexander and Leo Gordon, and starring Dan Duryea and Rod Cameron. The supporting cast features Audrey Dalton, Richard Arlen, Buster Crabbe, Fuzzy Knight, Johnny Mack Brown and Tom Kennedy. Broncho Billy Anderson, the cinema's first Western film star, makes his final appearance in the film. The film was released on July 31, 1965, by Embassy Pictures.

== Plot ==
Vermont native Willie Duggan comes west by stage coach. When he arrives in Silver Creek, broke but proud, he is befriended by the “captain”. Then he is brutally beaten for talking to dance hall hostess Carole Ridgeway. The thrashing, however, is terminated by Johnny Liam, who shoots and kills Duggan's assailant. Duggan finds work with a transport company, delivering the miners' payroll. When Duggan and his assistant Luther are ambushed, Duggan kills the robber.

After discovering that rewards are given for such work, Duggan and Luther become bounty hunters. Although they capture outlaw Mike Clayman, his henchmen follow the pair, killing Luther and wounding Duggan. The unconscious victim is found by rancher Ridgeway, whose daughter Carole restores the gunman to health. Despite his love for Carole, Duggan resolves to avenge his partner's death, cuts a double-barrel shotgun down to pistol length, and launches a one-man campaign to exterminate outlaws, Johnny Liam's younger brother among them. and later, Liam himself.

In his zeal, Duggan finally kills an innocent man, becoming a criminal in his own right. While eloping with Carole, Duggan himself is slain from ambush by a bounty hunter.

== Cast ==
- Dan Duryea as Willie Duggan
- Rod Cameron as Johnny Liam
- Audrey Dalton as Carole Ridgeway
- Richard Arlen as Matthew Ridgeway
- Buster Crabbe as Mike Clayman
- Fuzzy Knight as Captain Luther
- Johnny Mack Brown as Sheriff Green
- Peter Duryea as Youth
- Eddie Quillan as Pianist
- Grady Sutton as Minister
- Emory Parnell as Sam
- Norman Willis as Hank Willis
- Boyd Morgan as Big Jim Seddon
- Bob Steele as Red
- Dan White as Marshal Davis
- John Reach as Jeb
- Duane Ament as Ben Liam
- Michael Hinn as Mr. Weaver
- Dolores Domasin as Cantina Waitress
- Edmund Cobb as Townsman
- Ronn Delanor as Joe
- Dudley Ross as Indian
- I. Stanford Jolley as Sheriff Jones
- Frank Lackteen as Bartender in Cantina / Man in Audience
- Tom Kennedy as Joe
- Broncho Billy Anderson as The Man in the Cantina
