= Eddie Dew =

American actor and director (1909-1972)

- Born: January 29, 1909; Sumner, Washington
- Died: April 6, 1972 (aged 63); Burbank, California
- Occupations: Actor, director

Eddie Dew (January 29, 1909 – April 6, 1972) was an American actor, film director, and television director. As an actor, he is best remembered for his starring roles in B movie western films during the 1940s. In the 1950s he became active in directing both for film and television, most notably for the television series Sergeant Preston of the Yukon.

== Career ==
Dew was born in Sumner, Washington, and began his acting career in the mid-1930s, appearing in small film roles. His first film roles of any substance were as Captain Kendall in Military Academy (1940) and Henchman French in Dude Cowboy (1941). His first starring role was as Scott Yager in Red River Robin Hood (1942). This was followed by two leading roles for Republic Pictures in the westerns Beyond the Last Frontier (1943) and Raiders of Sunset Pass (1943). Afterwards Dew worked for Universal Pictures for the next decade, appearing mostly in supporting roles. Many of the pictures he made with Universal during the 1940s were with Rod Cameron, such as Trigger Trail (1944) and Renegades of the Rio Grande (1945).

In the early 1950s, Dew's career transferred more into working as a film and television director, although he still acted in the occasional film and television show up until his retirement in 1969. His last film was Pagan Island (1961) and his television credits included appearances on Annie Oakley, Buffalo Bill, Jr., and Hawaii Five-O.

Dew directed such films as The Living Bible (1952), The Living Bible: Last Journey to Jerusalem (1952), Naked Gun (1956), The Old Testament Scriptures (1958), Stump Run (1959), and Wings of Chance (1961). His work as a director is most associated with the television show Sergeant Preston of the Yukon, for which he directed 40 episodes. He died in Burbank, California in 1972, aged 63, from a brain tumor.
