= Dan White (actor) =

American actor (1908–1980)

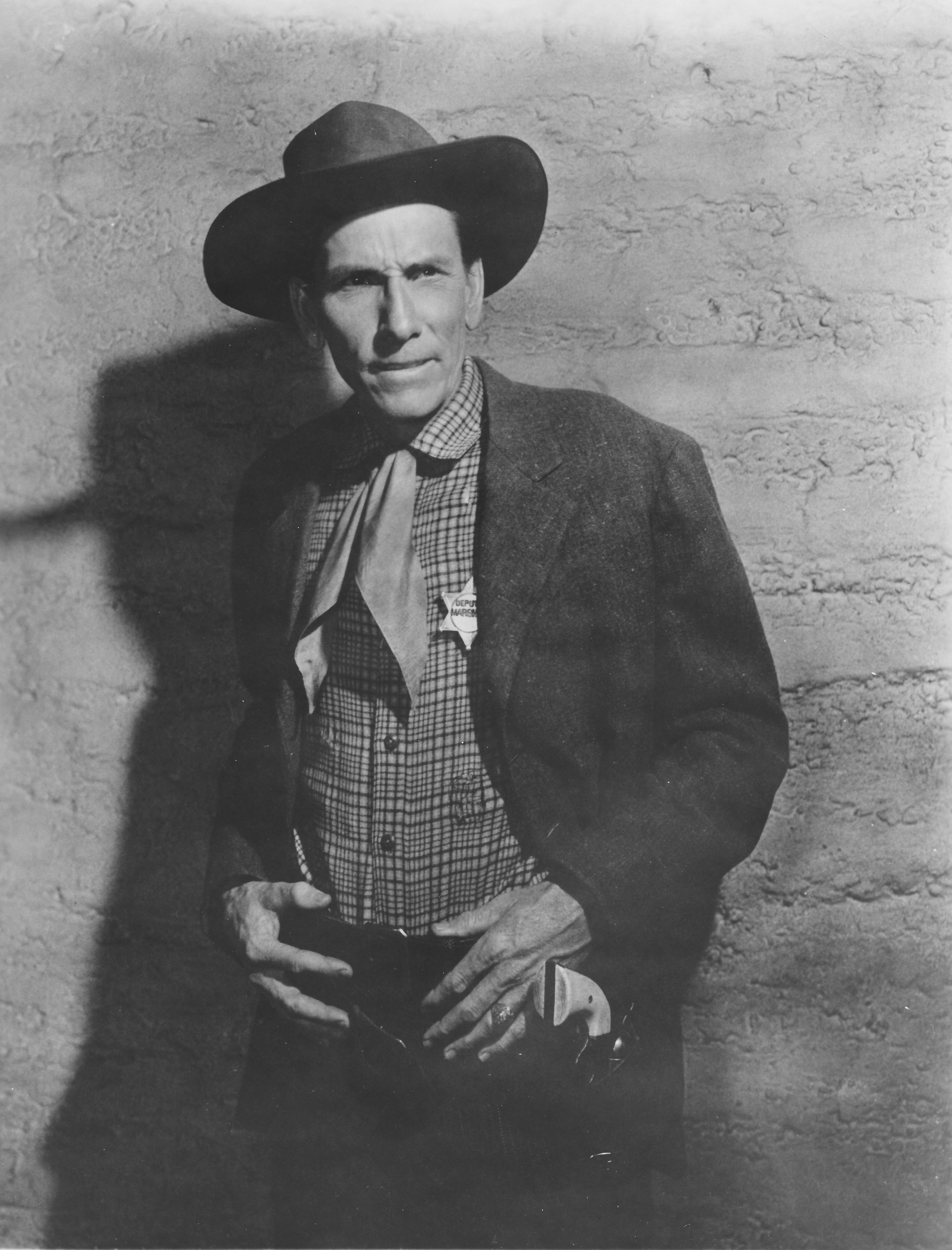
- White in Four Faces West (1948)
- Born: March 25, 1908; Falmouth, Florida, U.S.
- Died: July 7, 1980 (aged 72); Tampa, Florida, U.S.
- Resting place: Ashes scattered in the Gulf of Mexico off the Florida coast
- Occupation: Actor
- Years active: 1936–1977
- Known for: Westerns
- Spouses: Tilda Spivey (m. 1933–1967) Ella Beth Ward (m. 1968)
- Children: 3

Dan White (March 25, 1908 – July 7, 1980) was an American actor, well known for appearing in Western films and TV shows.

== Biography ==
=== Early life ===
White was born in 1908 to George and Orpha White about one mile (1.6 km) from the Suwannee River in Falmouth, Florida. He was one of 13 siblings. The family later moved to Lakeland, Florida.

In his youth, White was convicted of robbery and spent time in what is now Union Correctional Institution, in Raiford, Florida.

White acted in a show with Frances Langford in Tampa's Rialto Theatre. During this period, he met Matilda Mae "Tilda" Spivey. They wed on February 25, 1933. Tilda had a two-year-old son from a previous marriage, Arthur Grant Gifford. He still longed for a career in entertainment, resigned from the CCC in 1935, and began his journey to Hollywood with his small family. In January 1936, he stopped in Texarkana, Arkansas, while Tilda awaited the birth of their second child. Her sister, Mary, who was in Texarkana, invited the Whites to stay there for a few months. After the birth of the baby, June Larue White, the Whites continued toward California.

=== In Hollywood ===
Upon returning in 1938, he got work with Republic Pictures Corporation, making six films in his first year. The first film was Prairie Moon, starring Gene Autry. White made $55 a week during that picture. He claimed to have made about 300 films and 150 television cameos during his years in Hollywood. Around 70 percent were Westerns. His well-known films include The Yearling, Distant Drums, Red River, To Kill a Mockingbird, Giant, Duel in the Sun, Four Faces West, Jailhouse Rock, and Touch of Evil.

During this time, White and his wife had a third child, Donald Curtis White (born November 9, 1941). The films that made White most famous were his numerous appearances in B-Westerns, where he portrayed the antagonist. During the 1950s and 1960s, he started turning to television. He was offered the role of "Sam the Bartender" on Gunsmoke, but he didn't commit to the idea. He asked his best friend, Glenn Strange, to apply for the job instead. White's final movie was Black Sunday, in 1977.

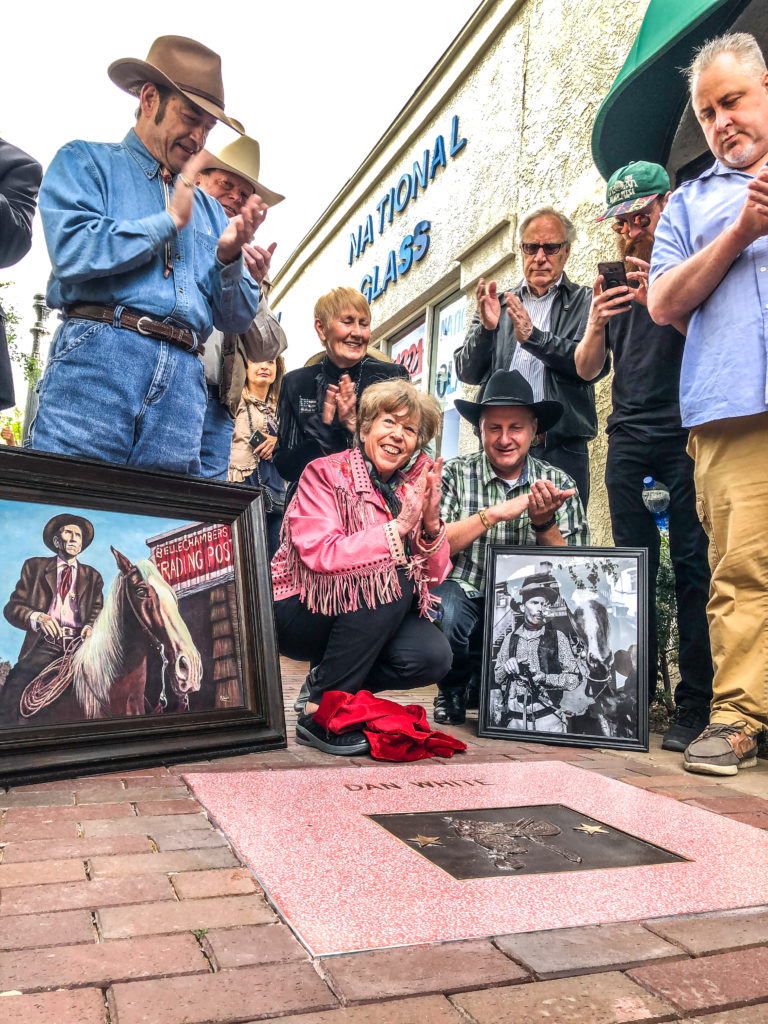
Family and fans gathered for Dan White's induction ceremony into the Newhall Walk of Western Stars

White was posthumously inducted into the Newhall Walk of Western Stars in Santa Clarita, California. His grandson John F. White accepted the honor on his behalf on April 11, 2019.

In 2025, John F. White published a biography of his grandfather, Highway Robbery to Hollywood Fame.

== Selected filmography ==
=== Motion pictures ===
Note: An asterisk (*) means that Dan White had an uncredited role; two asterisks means that he was credited as either Daniel White or Daniel M. White.

- Everybody's Old Man (1936) - (uncredited)
- Born to Be Wild (1938) - Striker (uncredited)
- Murder in the Family (1938) - Minor Role
- Prairie Moon (1938)* - Henchman Joe (uncredited)
- Shine On, Harvest Moon (1938) - Rancher (uncredited)
- Rough Riders' Round-up (1939)* - Border Patrolman (uncredited)
- The Law Comes to Texas (1939)* - Scout (uncredited)
- In Old Monterey (1939)* - Man at Meeting (uncredited)
- The Fighting Renegade (1939) - Henchman (uncredited)
- Jeepers Creepers (1939) - Townsman (uncredited)
- Rovin' Tumbleweeds (1939) - Townsman (uncredited)
- Destry Rides Again (1939)* - Barfly (uncredited)
- El Diablo Rides (1939) - Henchman (uncredited)
- Death Rides the Range (1939) - Townsman (uncredited)
- Gone with the Wind (1939) - Minor Role (uncredited)
- Days of Jesse James (1939)* - Irate Townsman (uncredited)
- The Grapes of Wrath (1940)* - Poor Man Walking with Woman in Transient Camp (uncredited)
- Beyond Tomorrow (1940) - Gas Station Attendant (uncredited)
- Our Town (1940)* - Wedding Guest Talking to Constable (uncredited)
- Adventures of Red Ryder (1940, Serial) - Townsman [Ch. 2] (uncredited)
- Deadwood Dick (1940, Serial) - Bank Teller / Stage Agent (uncredited)
- The Howards of Virginia (1940) - Will (uncredited)
- Too Many Girls (1940) - Faculty Extra (uncredited)
- She Couldn't Say No (1940) - Courtroom Spectator (uncredited)
- Back Street (1941) - Man at Ship's Ramp (uncredited)
- Prairie Pioneers (1941)* - Settler / Soldier (uncredited)
- The Singing Hill (1941) - Rancher (uncredited)
- The Lone Rider in Ghost Town (1941) - Townsman (uncredited)
- The Parson of Panamint (1941) - Hotel / Street Brawl Extra (uncredited)
- The Lone Rider in Frontier Fury (1941) - Saloon Gambler (uncredited)
- The Lone Rider Ambushed (1941) - Henchman (uncredited)
- Texas (1941) - Ringsider (uncredited)
- Lone Star Law Men (1941) - Henchman (uncredited)
- Forbidden Trails (1941) - Barfly (uncredited)
- Junior G-Men of the Air (1942, Serial) - Spectator (uncredited)
- Juke Girl (1942)* - Bartender at Muckeye's / Timmony Driver (uncredited)
- Tumbleweed Trail (1942) - Henchman (uncredited)
- Sheriff of Sage Valley (1942)* - Rancher (uncredited)
- Overland Stagecoach (1942)* - Railroad Worker (uncredited)
- I Married a Witch (1942) - Fireman (uncredited)
- Border Patrol (1943) - Henchman (uncredited)
- Lady of Burlesque (1943)* - Man in Audience (uncredited)
- Death Rides the Plains (1943) - Townsman (uncredited)
- Batman (1943, Serial) - Mover with Pickup Truck (uncredited)
- Fighting Valley (1943)* - Jeff Kelly (uncredited)
- The Black Hills Express (1943) - Townsman (uncredited)
- The Renegade (1943) - Henchman (uncredited)
- Trail of Terror (1943)* - Al - Relay Station Man (uncredited)
- The Kansan (1943) - Barfly (uncredited)
- Arizona Trail (1943) - Sheriff Jones
- Here Comes Kelly (1943) - Pool Hall Patron / Ringsider (uncredited)
- Blazing Guns (1943) - Henchman Trigger
- Outlaws of Stampede Pass (1943) - Kurt - Murdered Cowhand
- False Colors (1943)* - Bar Spectator (uncredited)
- Boss of Rawhide (1943) - Minstrel
- Smart Guy (1943) - Sheriff
- The Phantom (1943, Serial)* - Braddock (uncredited)
- Westward Bound (1944) - Henchman Wade
- Marshal of Gunsmoke (1944)* - Ed Gardner (uncredited)
- Outlaw Roundup (1944) - Bartender Louie (uncredited)
- Voodoo Man (1944) - Deputy
- Arizona Whirlwind (1944) - Jim Lockwood
- Frontier Outlaws (1944) - Stagecoach Guard (uncredited)
- Shine On, Harvest Moon (1944) - Rancher (uncredited)
- Guns of the Law (1944) - Henchman (uncredited)
- The Story of Dr. Wassell (1944) - Clerk in Admiral's Office (uncredited)
- Valley of Vengeance (1944) - Settler (uncredited)
- The Invisible Man's Revenge (1944)* - Pub Patron (uncredited)
- Fuzzy Settles Down (1944) - Man at Auction (uncredited)
- Raiders of Ghost City (1944, Serial) - Soldier [Chs. 3-5] (uncredited)
- The Utah Kid (1944) - Henchman Slim
- Gangsters of the Frontier (1944) - Townsman in Mayor's Office (uncredited)
- Black Arrow (1944)* - Paul Brent (uncredited)
- Mystery of the River Boat (1944, Serial) - Citizen (uncredited)
- The Great Mike (1944) - Sam McBride
- Harmony Trail (1944) - Bronco
- Crazy Knights (1944) - Electrician
- The Big Bonanza (1944)* - Rancher Willis (uncredited)
- Rough Ridin' Justice (1945)* - Henchman Mike (uncredited)
- Sudan (1945) - Man (uncredited)
- The Return of the Durango Kid (1945)* - Kirby Henchman (uncredited)
- Beyond the Pecos (1945)* - Sheriff (uncredited)
- Both Barrels Blazing (1945) - Henchman Poker Player (uncredited)
- Trail to Vengeance (1945)* - Henchman Clancy (uncredited)
- Flaming Bullets (1945) - Henchman (uncredited)
- Frontier Feud (1945) - Townsman (uncredited)
- San Antonio (1945)* - Joey Simms (uncredited)
- Gun Town (1946) - Joe - Henchman
- Gunman's Code (1946) - Townsman (uncredited)
- The Yearling (1946)* - Millwheel Forrester (uncredited)
- Duel in the Sun (1946)* - Ed, the Wrangler (uncredited)
- The Sea of Grass (1947)* - Wake - Brewton Ranch Hand (uncredited)
- Albuquerque (1948) - Henchman Jackson
- The Westward Trail (1948) - Henchman (uncredited)
- Silver River (1948) - Miner (uncredited)
- I Wouldn't Be in Your Shoes (1948) - Prisoner
- Shaggy (1948) - Joe Simms
- Four Faces West (1948) - Clint Waters
- The Walls of Jericho (1948) - Loafer (uncredited)
- Red River (1948)* - Laredo (uncredited)
- Station West (1948)* - Pete
- Sunset Carson Rides Again (1948) - Sheriff Norton
- Unknown Island (1948)** - Crewman Edwards
- Gunning for Justice (1948) - Sheriff
- Outlaw Country (1949) - Jim McCord
- Dynamite (1949)* - Skipper Brown (uncredited)
- Cover-Up (1949) - Gabe
- South of St. Louis (1949) - Sentry (uncredited)
- El Paso (1949) - Henchman (uncredited)
- She Wore a Yellow Ribbon (1949) - Trooper (uncredited)
- The Cowboy and the Indians (1949) - Farmer (uncredited)
- Intruder in the Dust (1949)* - Will Legate (uncredited)
- Roseanna McCoy (1949) - Abel Hatfield
- Return of the Frontiersman (1950) - Nicol
- The Gunfighter (1950) - Card Player in Barber Shop (uncredited)
- A Lady Without Passport (1950) - Airport Dispatcher (uncredited)
- Never a Dull Moment (1950) - Shivaree Partyer (uncredited)
- Vengeance Valley (1951)* - Cowhand at Campfire (uncredited)
- Sugarfoot (1951) - Rancher (uncredited)
- Oh! Susanna (1951) - Clerk (uncredited)
- Rawhide (1951) - Gilchrist (uncredited)
- Raton Pass (1951) - Scout (uncredited)
- Comin' Round the Mountain (1951) - Mountaineer
- David and Bathsheba (1951) - Soldier Who Touches the Ark of the Covenant (uncredited)
- His Kind of Woman (1951)* - Tex Kearns (uncredited)
- The Tall Target (1951) - Passenger in Club Car (uncredited)
- The Red Badge of Courage (1951)* - Sergeant (uncredited)
- Texas Carnival (1951) - Card Player (uncredited)
- Drums in the Deep South (1951) - Cpl. Jennings
- Red Mountain (1951) - Jim Braden, Assayer
- Distant Drums (1951)* - Cpl. Peachtree (uncredited)
- The Frontier Phantom (1952)* - Crayden Man (uncredited)
- Wait 'Til the Sun Shines, Nellie (1952) - Doc Thomas (uncredited)
- The Lusty Men (1952) - Rodeo Announcer #1 (uncredited)
- Horizons West (1952)* - Dennis (uncredited)
- She Couldn't Say No (1952) - Harley Burger (uncredited)
- The Silver Whip (1953) - Deputy Dodd Burdette (uncredited)
- Born to the Saddle (1953) - Sheriff
- Inferno (1953) - Lee - Ranch Hand (uncredited)
- A Lion Is in the Streets (1953) - Coroner (uncredited)
- Gun Fury (1953) - Sheepman (uncredited)
- Jubilee Trail (1954)* - Henry (uncredited)
- Taza, Son of Cochise (1954) - Tiswin Charlie
- Tennessee Champ (1954) - Baptist Minister (uncredited)
- Yankee Pasha (1954) - Dan - Fur Trader (uncredited)
- Suddenly (1954)* - Burg - Desk Officer (uncredited)
- The Country Girl (1954) - Man (uncredited)
- The Americano (1955) - Barney Dent
- Rage at Dawn (1955) - Train Conductor (uncredited)
- The Man from Bitter Ridge (1955) - Bender (uncredited)
- The Road to Denver (1955)* - Man in Buckboard
- The Tall Men (1955) - Hotel Clerk in San Antonio (uncredited)
- The Twinkle in God's Eye (1955) - Townsman (uncredited)
- Glory (1956) - Glory's Horse Trainer (uncredited)
- Red Sundown (1956) - Durango Saloon Patron (uncredited)
- The Last Hunt (1956)* - Deputy (uncredited)
- Great Day in the Morning (1956)* - Rogers (uncredited)
- Thunder Over Arizona (1956) - Mel Hogan (uncredited)
- The First Traveling Saleslady (1956)** - Sheriff
- Gun Brothers (1956)* - Jonathan Logan, Mormon Minister (uncredited)
- The Ten Commandments (1956) - Slave (uncredited)
- Giant (1956)* - Truck Driver in Diner (uncredited)
- The Rainmaker (1956) - Deputy (uncredited)
- The Lonely Man (1957) - Butcher (uncredited)
- Band of Angels (1957) - Trader (uncredited)
- Escape from San Quentin (1957) - Border Guard (uncredited)
- Jailhouse Rock (1957)* - Paymaster (uncredited)
- Gunfire at Indian Gap (1957) - Fred Moran
- Escape from Red Rock (1957)** - Al Farris
- Touch of Evil (1958)* - Customs Officer (uncredited)
- Quantrill's Raiders (1958) - Fred Thomas
- The Sheepman (1958) - Rancher (uncredited)
- The Proud Rebel (1958) - Court Clerk (uncredited)
- Frontier Gun (1958) - Sam Kilgore
- Gunmen from Laredo (1959) - Jury Foreman (uncredited)
- King of the Wild Stallions (1959) - Hawks (uncredited)
- This Earth is Mine (1959) - Judge Gruber
- The Big Fisherman (1959) - Minor Role (uncredited)
- Attack of the Giant Leeches (1959) - Porky Reed
- Beloved Infidel (1959)* - Bookshop Proprietor (uncredited)
- Ma Barker's Killer Brood (1960)** - Sheriff #2
- The Sergeant Was a Lady (1961) - Gen. Payson
- Lonely Are the Brave (1962) - Convict (uncredited)
- The Wild Westerners (1962) - Sheriff (uncredited)
- To Kill a Mockingbird (1962)* - Mob Leader (uncredited)
- The Cardinal (1963) - Lamar (uncredited)
- A Tiger Walks (1964)* - Tom Baker (uncredited)
- The Bounty Killer (1965)* - Marshal Davis
- Jesse James Meets Frankenstein's Daughter (1966) - Townsman Laughing at Sheriff
- Waco (1966) - Townsman
- Red Tomahawk (1967) - Ned Crone
- The Fastest Guitar Alive (1967) - Preacher (uncredited)
- The Cheyenne Social Club (1970) - Barfly Getting Up from Table (uncredited)
- Beyond the Valley of the Dolls (1970) - Dr. Scholl (uncredited)
- The Cheyenne Social Club (1970, TV Movie) - Man Representing Florida (uncredited)
- Skyjacked (1972) - Weber's Father
- Smoke in the Wind (1975) - Col. Joab Cullen
- Black Sunday (1977) - Man in Edward Hotel Elevator (uncredited)

== Television ==
- The Lone Ranger (1953) - John Portis
- Hopalong Cassidy (1953) - Bearcat Smith
- The Adventures of Kit Carson (1954) - Todd Weaver
- The Cisco Kid (1954) - Sheriff / Alan Moxley / Brace Haggar
- Climax! (1954) - Ben Berry
- The Adventures of Wild Bill Hickok (1952-1955) - Warner Laughton / Pinto
- Lux Video Theatre (1955) - Len Tollard
- Stories of the Century (1955) - Henchman Huck
- The Man Behind the Badge (1955) - Floyd / Caretaker
- Tales of the Texas Rangers (1956) - Sheriff
- Screen Directors Playhouse (1956) - 4th Farmer
- Telephone Time (1956) - Ed
- The Adventures of Jim Bowie (1956) - Settler
- West Point (1956) - Amby Bracken
- Cavalcade of America (1953-1956) - Stan
- Red Ryder (1956) - Sheriff
- Sheriff of Cochise (1957) - Charlie Desmond
- Science Fiction Theatre (1957) - Bud
- Circus Boy (1957) - Ben Otis / Sheriff / Gus
- Adventures of Superman (1957) - Mike
- The Ford Television Theatre (1957) - Mr. Harris
- Casey Jones (1957) - Sam Peterson
- Highway Patrol (1957-1958) - Pete Burgess / Joe Valentine
- Broken Arrow (1958) - Roberts
- From These Roots (1958) - Dan Fraser (1958-1960)
- Northwest Passage (1959) - Mercer (uncredited)
- The Californians (1958-1959) - Roadhouse Proprietor / Turnkey
- Lassie (1959) - Amos Lovejoy
- Wanted: Dead or Alive (1960) - Stableman (uncredited)
- Overland Trail (1960) - Miner (uncredited)
- Wichita Town (1960) - Salty
- Bat Masterson (1960) - S2E21 "Cattle and Canes" as Rancher Ben Taylor
- The Texan (1959-1960) - Mulligan / Sheriff Dawson
- Thriller (1960) - Doctor
- General Electric Theater (1960) - Sheriff
- The Deputy (1959-1960) - Joab Sharpe / Sheriff Wilks
- Twilight Zone (1961) - Man #2 (uncredited)
- Sugarfoot (1957-1961) Cowhand / Kennedy
- The Rebel (1961) - Corby
- Maverick (1958-1961) - Poe / Stableman
- The Life and Legend of Wyatt Earp (1955-1961) - Zack Burton / Townsman / Witness / Judge Norton / Wilkins - Second Prisoner in Line
- Bat Masterson (1960-1961) - Sheriff Bart Sloane / Ben Taylor
- Checkmate (1961) - Man
- Walt Disney's Wonderful World of Color (1958-1961) - Storekeeper / William Ryan / Deputy (uncredited)
- Outlaws (1961) - Wagon Driver (uncredited)
- Sea Hunt (1961, Season 4, Episode 28) - Sheriff Wyatt Walsh
- Cheyenne (1961) - Man
- Rawhide (1959-1962) - Sheriff of Elkville / Windy
- Tales of Wells Fargo (1958-1962) - Pete the Bartender / Matt Gray / Nedy West / Miner Who Quit
- Laramie (1959-1962) - Pa Tilford / Stagecoach Driver / Pop - Telegrapher / Man of God / Townsman
- Have Gun - Will Travel (1962) - Sam - Henchman
- The Rifleman (1958-1963) - Russell / Cowboy on Trail
- Wagon Train (1958-1963) - Taggert / Wagon Driver / Joe Lassiter
- Ripcord (1962-1963) - Mr. Ledbetter / Replaced / Simmons
- Destry (1964) - Stableman (uncredited)
- Flipper (1965) - Captain Bender
- Bob Hope Presents the Chrysler Theatre (1963-1966) - Fred
- The Beverly Hillbillies (1966) - Man
- Petticoat Junction (1965-1966) - Homer Overstreet / 1st Juror
- Green Acres (1965-1967) - Man
- Bonanza (196-1967) - Townsman #2 / Stableman / Weems / Tom / Stableman / Simms / Station Agent / Zeke Jackson
- The Name of the Game (1970) - Sheriff Prentiss
- The High Chaparral (1967-1970) - Dirt Smith / Sheriff Prentiss / Bob Willis
- The Virginian (1962-1970) - Conductor / Stableman / Baggage Man / Edwards / Fox
- Adam-12 (1971) - Benny
- Gunsmoke (1960-1972) - Oldtimer / Stocker / Attendant / Bartender / Dan - Bartender / Ainsley
- Barnaby Jones (1973)
- Mannix (1973) - Steve (uncredited)
