= Mary Gordon (actress) =

Scottish actress (1882–1963)

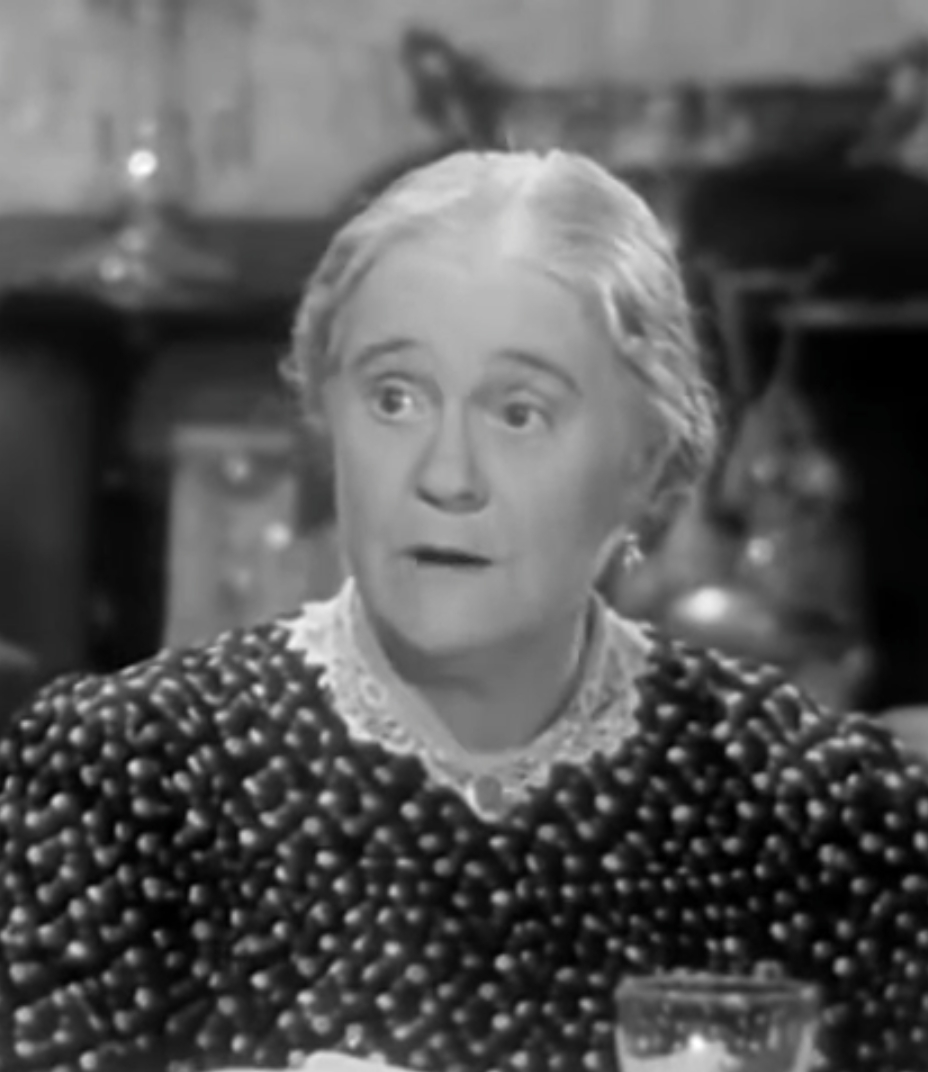
- Gordon in I Take This Oath (1940)
- Born: Mary Gilmour; 16 May 1882; Glasgow, Lanarkshire, Scotland
- Died: 23 August 1963 (aged 81); Pasadena, California, U.S.
- Occupation: Actress
- Years active: 1925–1950
- Notable work: Mrs. Hudson, Sherlock Holmes' landlady on radio and film
- Children: 1

Mary Gordon (born Mary Gilmour; 16 May 1882 – 23 August 1963) was a Scottish actress who mainly played housekeepers and mothers, most notably the landlady Mrs. Hudson in the Sherlock Holmes series of movies of the 1940s starring Basil Rathbone and Nigel Bruce. Her body of work included nearly 300 films between 1925 and 1950.

== Early life ==
Gordon was born on 16 May 1882, in Glasgow, Scotland, the fifth of seven children of Mary and Robert Gilmour, a wire weaver. She worked as a dressmaker before finding work on the stage. She became a concert singer when she was 17 years old, but she left that career behind when she married. After her husband died during World War I she opened a boarding house to support her mother, her baby daughter, and herself. Joining a company bound for an American tour, she came to the U.S. in her twenties, apparently making a few appearances on Broadway in small roles, but primarily touring in stock companies. Gordon came to the United States with her mother and daughter soon after World War I ended. After working three months as a waitress in the Robertson-Cole Studios, she became the cook there. She had bit parts in films and coached Katharine Hepburn on using a Scottish dialect for the film The Little Minister.

== Career ==
Gordon arrived in Los Angeles with her mother and daughter in the mid-1920s, and began playing variations on the roles she would spend her career in. She became friends with John Ford while making Hangman's House in 1928 and made seven more films with him. In 1939, she took on her best-remembered role as Sherlock Holmes' landlady, Mrs. Hudson, and played the role in ten films and numerous radio plays. She was a charter member of the Hollywood Canteen, entertaining servicemen throughout the Second World War. On the radio show Those We Love, she played the regular role of Mrs. Emmett.

She entered retirement just as television reshaped the entertainment industry, making only a single appearance in that medium.

She was active in the Daughters of Scotia auxiliary of the Order of Scottish Clans.

She lived out her final years in Pasadena, California with her daughter and grandson. She died at age 81 on 23 August 1963, in Pasadena after a long illness.

== Selected filmography ==
- The Dome Doctor (1925, Short) - Woman with Long Hair (uncredited)
- The Home Maker (1925) - Mrs. Hennessy
- Tessie (1925) - Aunt Maggie
- One of the Bravest (1925) - Tenement Boy's Mother
- The People vs. Nancy Preston (1925) - Mrs. Tifft
- Lights of Old Broadway (1925) - Minor Role (uncredited)
- Black Paradise (1926) - Mrs. Murphy
- The Dixie Flyer (1926) - Mrs. Clancy
- Naughty Nanette (1927) - Mrs. Rooney
- The Claw (1927) - Bit (uncredited)
- Annie Laurie (1927) - First Midwife (uncredited)
- Clancy's Kosher Wedding (1927) - Molly Clancy
- Little Mickey Grogan (1927) - Kind Landlady (uncredited)
- The Matinee Idol (1928) - Woman in Audience (uncredited)
- Hangman's House (1928) - The Woman at Hogan's Hideout (uncredited)
- Our Dancing Daughters (1928) - Scrubwoman (uncredited)
- The Ol' Gray Hoss (1928, Short) - First taxi passenger
- The Old Code (1928) - Mary MacGregr
- The Black Watch (1929) - Sandy's Wife (uncredited)
- Madame X (1929) - Nursemaid (uncredited)
- Is Everybody Happy? (1929) - Neighbor (uncredited)
- The Saturday Night Kid (1929) - Reducing customer (uncredited)
- The Sky Hawk (1929) - Mary, the Maid (uncredited)
- Dynamite (1929) - Neighbor at Store (uncredited)
- Sunny Side Up (1929) - Grocery Shopper (uncredited)
- Hell's Heroes (1929) - Choir Member (uncredited)
- Seven Days' Leave (1930) - Bit (uncredited)
- The Duke of Dublin (1930, Short)
- His Honor the Mayor (1930, Short)
- When the Wind Blows (1930, Short) - Chubby's Mother (uncredited)
- Las Fantasmas (1930, Short) - Chubby's Mama
- Roaring Ranch (1930) - Mrs. O'Riley (uncredited)
- Let Us Be Gay (1930) - Mrs. McIntyre (uncredited)
- Our Blushing Brides (1930) - Mrs. Mannix - Tenement Woman (uncredited)
- Manslaughter (1930) - Cook (uncredited)
- Song o' My Heart (1930) - Irish Woman (uncredited)
- Anybody's Woman (1930) - (uncredited)
- Dance with Me (1930, Short)
- Oh, For a Man! (1930) - Stage Door Admirer with Violets (uncredited)
- Unfaithful (1931) - Bit (uncredited)
- Subway Express (1931) - Mrs. Delaney
- Always Goodbye (1931) - Mrs. MacPherson, Moviegoer (uncredited)
- The Black Camel (1931) - Mrs. MacMasters
- The Brat (1931) - Angry Wife in Night Court (uncredited)
- Waterloo Bridge (1931) - Distraught Woman on Stairway (uncredited)
- 24 Hours (1931) - Nurse (uncredited)
- Possessed (1931) - Woman at Political Rally (uncredited)
- Frankenstein (1931) - Mourner (uncredited)
- Models and Wives (1931, Short)
- A House Divided (1931) - Townswoman (uncredited)
- Ladies of the Big House (1931) - Inmate (uncredited)
- Delicious (1931) - Dancer (uncredited)
- A Fool's Advice (1932) - Woman at Rally (uncredited)
- Texas Cyclone (1932) - Katie
- The Impatient Maiden (1932) - Irish Neighbor (uncredited)
- The Expert (1932) - Neighbor (uncredited)
- The Big Timer (1932) - 2nd Job Seeker (uncredited)
- Dancers in the Dark (1932) - Cleaning Lady (uncredited)
- Devil's Lottery (1932) - Inquest Onlooker (uncredited)
- Scandal for Sale (1932) - Hotel Resident (uncredited)
- The Trial of Vivienne Ware (1932) - Court Matron (uncredited)
- Radio Patrol (1932) - Landlady (uncredited)
- Beauty Parlor (1932) - Landlady (uncredited)
- Almost Married (1932) - Cook
- 70,000 Witnesses (1932) - Scrubwoman (uncredited)
- Blonde Venus (1932) - Landlady (uncredited)
- Pack Up Your Troubles (1932) - Mrs. MacTavish (uncredited)
- Wild Girl (1932) - Washerwoman (uncredited)
- Call Her Savage (1932) - Lady in Tenement (uncredited)
- Laughter in Hell (1933) - Townswoman (uncredited)
- She Done Him Wrong (1933) - Cleaning Lady (uncredited)
- Her Splendid Folly (1933) - Mrs. Clancey
- Ladies They Talk About (1933) - Prisoner in Visiting Room (uncredited)
- Men Must Fight (1933) - Pacifist Audience Member (uncredited)
- Nature in the Wrong (1933, Short) - Mrs. Clancy (uncredited)
- Sweepings (1933) - Mrs. Patrick O'Leary (uncredited)
- The Whirlwind (1933) - Mrs. Curtis
- The Kiss Before the Mirror (1933) - Scrubwoman (uncredited)
- Pilgrimage (1933) - Mrs. MacGregor (uncredited)
- The Power and the Glory (1933) - Nurse (uncredited)
- Doctor Bull (1933) - Townswoman at Meeting (uncredited)
- Brief Moment (1933) - Cook (uncredited)
- Footlight Parade (1933) - Wardrobe Woman on Bus (uncredited)
- My Woman (1933) - Woman at Ironing Board (uncredited)
- Meet the Baron (1933) - Washer Woman (uncredited)
- Broadway Through a Keyhole (1933) - Cleaning Woman (uncredited)
- The Invisible Man (1933) - Screaming Woman (uncredited)
- Design for Living (1933) - Theatre Chambermaid (uncredited)
- The World Changes (1933) - Lady at Party (uncredited)
- Beloved (1934) - Mrs. O'Leary
- The Woman Condemned (1934) - Crying Woman at Night Court (uncredited)
- Voice in the Night (1934) - Woman on Phone in Montage (uncredited)
- Manhattan Melodrama (1934) - Boat Passenger (uncredited)
- Change of Heart (1934) - Woman in Street (uncredited)
- Murder at the Vanities (1934) - Assistant Wardrobe Woman (uncredited)
- The Loudspeaker (1934) - Landlady (uncredited)
- The Most Precious Thing in Life (1934) - Washerwoman (uncredited)
- A Man's Game (1934) - Landlady (uncredited)
- The World Moves On (1934) - English Soldier's Mother (uncredited)
- Baby Take a Bow (1934) - Mrs. O'Brien (uncredited)
- Cross Streets (1934) - Sonny's Mother
- Whom the Gods Destroy (1934) - Newfoundlander (uncredited)
- The Defense Rests (1934) - Scrub Woman (uncredited)
- I Give My Love (1934) - Marie (uncredited)
- Our Daily Bread (1934) - Community Woman in Cottage (uncredited)
- One More River (1934) - Cook (uncredited)
- The Man from Hell (1934) - Mrs. Frank McCarrol (uncredited)
- Charlie Chan in London (1934) - Prison Visitor (uncredited)
- Flirtation (1934) - Woman on a Window (uncredited)
- The Little Minister (1934) - Nanny
- I'm a Father (1935, Short) - Neighbor
- Vanessa: Her Love Story (1935) - Mrs. Leathwaite
- Bride of Frankenstein (1935) - Hans' Wife
- Vagabond Lady (1935) - Myrtle - Cleaning Lady (uncredited)
- $10 Raise (1935) - Landlady (uncredited)
- Ginger (1935) - Mrs. Monohan (uncredited)
- The Irish in Us (1935) - Ma O'Hara
- Bonnie Scotland (1935) - Mrs. Bickerdike
- Waterfront Lady (1935) - Mrs. O'Flaherty
- Metropolitan (1935) - Mrs. Tolentino (uncredited)
- Mutiny on the Bounty (1935) - Peddler (uncredited)
- The Lady Consents (1936) - Apple Lady (uncredited)
- Little Lord Fauntleroy (1936) - Farmer's Wife on Way to Church (uncredited)
- Laughing Irish Eyes (1936) - Mrs. O'Keefe
- Share the Wealth (1936, Short) - Ma MacClyde
- Forgotten Faces (1936) - Mrs. O'Leary
- Little Miss Nobody (1936) - Mrs. Biddle (uncredited)
- The White Angel (1936) - Nursing Applicant (uncredited)
- Mary of Scotland (1936) - Nurse
- Yellowstone (1936) - Mrs. McDougall (uncredited)
- Stage Struck (1936) - Mrs. Cassidy
- The Plot Thickens (1936) - Woman with Bag (uncredited)
- After the Thin Man (1936) - Rose (uncredited)
- The Plough and the Stars (1936) - Woman at Barricades
- Great Guy (1936) - Mrs. Ogilvie
- The Great O'Malley (1937) - Mrs. O'Malley
- Nancy Steele Is Missing! (1937) - Mrs. Watson - Landlady (uncredited)
- Her Husband Lies (1937) - Mrs. Jenks (uncredited)
- Racketeers in Exile (1937) - Irish Woman (uncredited)
- Way Out West (1937) - Cook (uncredited)
- That I May Live (1937) - Mrs. Healy (uncredited)
- Pick A Star (1937) - Mrs. Watts - Undertaker's Wife (uncredited)
- The Man in Blue (1937) - Woman (uncredited)
- Married Before Breakfast (1937) - Mrs. Nevins (uncredited)
- One Man Justice (1937) - Bridget
- Meet the Boyfriend (1937) - Mrs. Grimes
- The Toast of New York (1937) - Mrs. Callahan - Charwoman (uncredited)
- You Can't Have Everything (1937) - Y.W.C.A. Scrub Woman (uncredited)
- Souls at Sea (1937) - Cook (uncredited)
- Double Wedding (1937) - Mrs. Keough
- A Damsel in Distress (1937) - Cook (uncredited)
- You're Only Young Once (1937) - Mary's Mother (uncredited)
- Mannequin (1937) - Mrs. O'Rourke (uncredited)
- Lady Behave! (1937) - Cook
- Friend Indeed (1937, Short) - Housekeeper
- Kidnapped (1938) - Mrs. MacDonald
- Blond Cheat (1938) - Maggie - the Charwoman (uncredited)
- City Streets (1938) - Mrs. Devlin
- Gateway (1938) - Scottish Mother (uncredited)
- Campus Confessions (1938) - Mrs. Twill (uncredited)
- Vacation from Love (1938) - Maggie, the Cook (uncredited)
- Angels with Dirty Faces (1938) - Mrs. Patrick McGee (uncredited)
- Thanks for Everything (1938) - Maggie, Irish Woman (uncredited)
- Off the Record (1939) - Mrs. Finnegan (uncredited)
- Wings of the Navy (1939) - Irene's Housekeeper (uncredited)
- Tail Spin (1939) - Mrs. Lee
- The Hound of the Baskervilles (1939) - Mrs. Hudson
- Broadway Serenade (1939) - Annie (uncredited)
- Code of the Streets (1939) - Mrs. Flaherty (uncredited)
- Tell No Tales (1939) - Mrs. Bryant (uncredited)
- Racketeers of the Range (1939) - Mary - Benson's Housekeeper (uncredited)
- Captain Fury (1939) - Mrs. Bailey
- The Jones Family in Hollywood (1939) - Landlady (uncredited)
- She Married a Cop (1939) - Ma Duffy
- The Story That Couldn't Be Printed (1939, Short) - Woman Reading Newspaper (uncredited)
- The Adventures of Sherlock Holmes (1939) - Mrs. Hudson
- Parents on Trial (1939) - Martha
- The Escape (1939) - Neighbor (uncredited)
- Mr. Smith Goes to Washington (1939) - Woman (uncredited)
- The Marshal of Mesa City (1939) - Mrs. Dudley
- Rulers of the Sea (1939) - Mrs. Ogilvie (uncredited)
- Day-Time Wife (1939) - Scrubwoman (uncredited)
- The Night of Nights (1939) - Mrs. O'Leary (uncredited)
- Joe and Ethel Turp Call on the President (1939) - 1st Pencil Woman (uncredited)
- My Son Is Guilty (1939) - Mrs. Montabelli (uncredited)
- The Invisible Man Returns (1940) - Cookie, the Cook (uncredited)
- Women Without Names (1940) - Juror (uncredited)
- My Son, My Son! (1940) - Mrs. Mulvaney
- Saps at Sea (1940) - Mrs. O'Riley (uncredited)
- Tear Gas Squad (1940) - Mrs. Sullivan
- I Take This Oath (1940) - Mrs. Eileen Hanagan
- Brother Orchid (1940) - Mrs. Sweeney - Flo's Landlady (uncredited)
- The Last Alarm (1940) - Mrs. Hadley
- The Man Who Talked Too Much (1940) - Mrs. Dunn (uncredited)
- Queen of the Mob (1940) - Tenement Landlady
- When the Daltons Rode (1940) - Ma Dalton
- Young People (1940) - Old Woman (uncredited)
- Public Deb No. 1 (1940) - Landlady (uncredited)
- Nobody's Children (1940) - Mary
- Go West (1940) - Train Passenger (uncredited)
- No, No, Nanette (1940) - Gertrude, the Cook
- Kitty Foyle (1940) - First Charwoman (uncredited)
- The Invisible Woman (1940) - Mrs. Bates
- Flight from Destiny (1941) - Martha
- Pot o' Gold (1941) - Ma McCorkle
- Double Cross (1941) - Mrs. Murray
- Unfinished Business (1941) - Miss Brady (uncredited)
- Unexpected Uncle (1941) - Mrs. Mason (uncredited)
- It Started with Eve (1941) - Mrs. O'Toole - Cleaning Lady (uncredited)
- How Green Was My Valley (1941) - Gossiper (uncredited)
- Appointment for Love (1941) - Martha
- Borrowed Hero (1941) - Mrs. Riley
- Riot Squad (1941) - Mrs. McGonigle
- Sealed Lips (1942) - Mrs. Ann Morton (Fred's mother)
- Blue, White and Perfect (1942) - Mrs. Flaherty - Mike's Landlady (uncredited)
- Bombay Clipper (1942) - Abigail 'Mag' MacPherson
- Fly-by-Night (1942) - Ma Prescott
- The Strange Case of Doctor Rx (1942) - Mrs. Scott (uncredited)
- Dr. Broadway (1942) - Broadway Carrie
- Meet the Stewarts (1942) - Mrs. Stewart
- It Happened in Flatbush (1942) - Mrs. Collins
- Powder Town (1942) - Mrs. Douglas
- The Pride of the Yankees (1942) - Maid (uncredited)
- Sherlock Holmes and the Voice of Terror (1942) - Mrs. Hudson (uncredited)
- Halfway to Shanghai (1942) - Mrs. McIntyre
- The Mummy's Tomb (1942) - Jane Banning
- Gentleman Jim (1942) - Mrs. Casey (uncredited)
- The Boss of Big Town (1942) - Mrs. Lane
- Sherlock Holmes and the Secret Weapon (1942) - Mrs. Hudson
- Forever and a Day (1943) - Woman in Air Raid Shelter (uncredited)
- Sherlock Holmes in Washington (1943) - Mrs. Hudson (uncredited)
- Keep 'Em Slugging (1943) - Mrs. Banning
- Sarong Girl (1943) - Mattie
- Two Tickets to London (1943) - Mrs. Tinkle
- Sherlock Holmes Faces Death (1943) - Mrs. Hudson (uncredited)
- Here Comes Kelly (1943) - Mrs. Kelly
- Sweet Rosie O'Grady (1943) - Charwoman (uncredited)
- You're a Lucky Fellow, Mr. Smith (1943) - Woman (uncredited)
- The Spider Woman (1943) - Mrs. Hudson
- Smart Guy (1943) - Maggie
- Whispering Footsteps (1943) - Ma Murphy
- The Racket Man (1944) - Ma Duffy (uncredited)
- Ladies Courageous (1944) - Old Lady (uncredited)
- Million Dollar Kid (1944) - Mrs. McGinnis
- Hat Check Honey (1944) - Jennie
- The Hour Before the Dawn (1944) - Annie (uncredited)
- Follow the Leader (1944) - Mrs. McGinnis (uncredited)
- Secrets of Scotland Yard (1944) - Libby the Housekeeper (uncredited)
- Secret Command (1944) - Mrs. McKenzie (uncredited)
- The Pearl of Death (1944) - Mrs. Hudson
- Ever Since Venus (1944) - Mrs. Murphy (uncredited)
- National Barn Dance (1944) - Mrs. Owen (uncredited)
- The Last Ride (1944) - Mrs. Mary Kelly
- Irish Eyes Are Smiling (1944) - Irish Woman (uncredited)
- Hollywood Canteen (1944) - Hostess (uncredited)
- Music for Millions (1944) - Hotel Proprietress (uncredited)
- Eadie Was a Lady (1945) - Old Lady (uncredited)
- The Body Snatcher (1945) - Mrs. Mary McBride (uncredited)
- It's a Pleasure (1945) - Tenement Woman (uncredited)
- See My Lawyer (1945) - Mrs. Fillmore
- The Woman in Green (1945) - Mrs. Hudson
- Captain Eddie (1945) - Mrs. Westrom
- Pride of the Marines (1945) - Lady at Bus Stop (uncredited)
- Divorce (1945) - Ellen
- Strange Confession (1945) - Mrs. O'Connor
- Kitty (1945) - Nanny
- Little Giant (1946) - Ma Miller
- Sentimental Journey (1946) - Agnes (uncredited)
- The Hoodlum Saint (1946) - Trina
- Dressed to Kill (1946) - Mrs. Hudson
- In Fast Company (1946) - Mrs. Cassidy
- Shadows Over Chinatown (1946) - Mrs. Conover
- The Dark Horse (1946) - Mrs. Mahoney (uncredited)
- Sing While You Dance (1946) - Mom Henderson
- Sister Kenny (1946) - Mrs. Gordon (uncredited)
- Singin' in the Corn (1946) - Mrs. O'Rourke
- Stallion Road (1947) - Mrs. Ford, Purcell's Housekeeper (uncredited)
- The Long Night (1947) - Old Lady in Crowd (uncredited)
- The Secret Life of Walter Mitty (1947) - Mother Machree (uncredited)
- Exposed (1947) - Miss Keets
- The Invisible Wall (1947) - Mrs. Bledsoe
- Roses Are Red (1947) - Scrubwoman (uncredited)
- The Judge Steps Out (1948) - Annie, the Scrub Woman (uncredited)
- Angels' Alley (1948) - Mrs. Mamie Mahoney
- Fort Apache (1948) - Ma (barmaid)
- Big Town Scandal (1948) - Mary - Cleaning Woman (uncredited)
- The Vicious Circle (1948) - Mrs. Hogan (revised version) (uncredited)
- The Strange Mrs. Crane (1948) - Nora
- Hills of Home (1948) - Mrs. Burnbrae (uncredited)
- Kidnapped (1948) - Scottish Woman (uncredited)
- The Dark Past (1948) - Passenger on Bus (uncredited)
- Highway 13 (1948) - Aunt Myrt Lacy
- Shamrock Hill (1949) - Grandma Rogan
- Tucson (1949) - Housemother (uncredited)
- Mighty Joe Young (1949) - Old Woman (unconfirmed)
- Mr. Soft Touch (1949) - Slatternly Woman Tenant (uncredited)
- Haunted Trails (1949) - Aunt Libby
- Deputy Marshall (1949) - Mrs. Lance
- Challenge to Lassie (1949) - Tenement Neighbor (uncredited)
- The File on Thelma Jordon (1950) - Charwoman (uncredited)
- West of Wyoming (1950) - Nora Jones
