= Voodoo Man =

1944 film by William Beaudine

- Promotional release poster
- Directed by: William Beaudine
- Written by: Robert Charles (original story and screenplay)
- Produced by: Sam Katzman; Jack Dietz
- Starring: Bela Lugosi; John Carradine; George Zucco
- Cinematography: Marcel LePicard
- Edited by: Carl Pierson
- Music by: Edward Kay (musical director)
- Production company: Banner Productions
- Distributed by: Monogram Pictures Corp.
- Release date: February 21, 1944
- Running time: 62 minutes
- Country: United States
- Language: English

Voodoo Man is a 1944 American horror film directed by William Beaudine, and starring Bela Lugosi, John Carradine and George Zucco.

== Plot ==
Nicholas runs an isolated gas station in the countryside. One night, he gives a young woman driver directions to Twin Falls, but after she leaves, he notifies someone via a special telephone. Two men, Toby and Grego, block the road with a traffic barricade and uncover a previously hidden road. They capture her; she is the third woman motorist reported missing on Laurel Road that month.

Hollywood screenwriter Ralph Benton turns down his boss's suggestion that these disappearances would make a good horror script, as he is getting married soon. By chance, he stops at Nicholas's gas station, but drives off before the attendant can pump any fuel. He runs out of gas. Meanwhile, another woman driver, Stella Saunders, stops at the station and receives the same directions. This time, however, Ralph hitches a ride with her. It turns out she is to be the maid of honor at the wedding of her cousin Betty to "some sap from Hollywood": himself. Dr. Richard Marlowe watches by television as the car is mysteriously disabled. When Ralph leaves to seek help at a house visible in the distance, Marlowe orders his men to kidnap Stella.

Marlowe introduces Stella to his wife Evelyn ... who has been dead for 22 years, though she is mysteriously preserved. He tells Stella that he wants something from her to help his wife, "your will to live, your mind".

Nobody answers when Ralph knocks on the door of Marlowe's house, and he returns to find Stella and the car gone. When he eventually sees Betty, he learns that Stella is missing and goes to the sheriff.

Marlowe, Nicholas and the others prepare a voodoo ceremony. Stella, Evelyn and four women zombies are brought into the room. Marlowe tries to transfer Stella's mind and soul into Evelyn's body to bring her back to life. It works, but only briefly. Marlowe remains determined to find a woman with "perfect affinity". After a visit from the sheriff, Marlowe decides to try again with Stella, but Toby left her cell door open, and she escapes, though in a trance-like state. The sheriff and his deputy find her on the road and take her to the Benton apartment. Toby finds out where she is, and Marlowe goes there to offer his medical expertise. He says she just needs some rest.

Nicholas summons Stella using voodoo. Ralph and Betty go to see Marlowe. He shows them a portrait of his dead wife. When he telephones the sheriff, Evelyn wanders into the entrance of the room and is seen by Ralph and Betty but not Marlowe, before an older woman takes her away. After Ralph and Betty leave, Marlowe wonders if Betty might have "perfect affinity" to his wife. He has Nicholas summon Betty while Ralph is phoning the sheriff. Ralph sets out in pursuit and arrives in the middle of the ceremony, but is promptly knocked out by Grego. The sheriff and his deputy arrive just as Evelyn returns briefly to life. The sheriff shoots Marlowe, who tells his wife "Soon, we will be together," before dying. Stella and Betty come out of their trances.

Ralph turns in a script titled "The Voodoo Man" to his boss, who asks who should star in it. Ralph suggests ... Bela Lugosi.

== Cast ==
- Bela Lugosi as Dr. Marlowe
- John Carradine as Toby
- George Zucco as Nicholas
- Wanda McKay as Betty
- Louise Currie as Stella
- Michael Ames as Ralph
- Ellen Hall as Mrs. Marlowe
- Terry Walker as Alice
- Mary Currier as Mrs. Benton
- Claire James as Zombie
- Henry Hall as Sheriff
- Dan White as Deputy
- Pat McKee as Grego
- Mici Goty as Housekeeper

Uncredited (in order of appearance)
| John Ince | S. K. (initials of Banner Productions' founder Sam Katzman), producer at Banner Motion Picture Company and Ralph's boss |
| Ethelreda Leopold | girl behind the counter in the coffee shop |
| Edward Keane | customer sitting at the counter in the coffee shop |
| George DeNormand | customer sitting at a table in the coffee shop |
| Dennis Moore | driver in his car outside the coffee shop |

== Production ==
This film, along with Return of the Ape Man, shot in seven days beginning on October 16, 1943, were Lugosi's final Monogram features. Both films also featured John Carradine, George Zucco, Michael Ames and Mary Currier. Originally titled Tiger Man by author Andrew Colvin, it was later changed as Voodoo Man and Colvin received no screen credit.

== Home media ==
In 2009, Rifftrax released a humorous audio commentary track satirizing the film, featuring Michael J. Nelson and other performers.

The film was subsequently released by Olive Films on DVD and Blu-ray in 2015.
