= Biondolillo =

Biondolillo is a surname. Notable people with the surname include:

- Gaspere Biondolillo, later known as Jack La Rue, (1902–1984), American actor
- Jack Biondolillo (1940–2021), American bowler
