= There Goes Kelly =

1945 film

- Directed by: Phil Karlson
- Written by: Edmond Kelso; Tim Ryan
- Produced by: William Strohbach
- Starring: Jackie Moran; Wanda McKay; Sidney Miller
- Cinematography: William A. Sickner
- Edited by: Richard C. Currier
- Music by: Edward J. Kay
- Production company: Monogram Pictures
- Distributed by: Monogram Pictures
- Release date: February 16, 1945
- Running time: 61 minutes
- Country: United States
- Language: English

There Goes Kelly is a 1945 American comedy mystery film directed by Phil Karlson and starring Jackie Moran, Wanda McKay and Sidney Miller. It was produced and distributed by Monogram Pictures. It is a remake of the 1940 film Up in the Air, and also acts as a sequel to the 1943 film Here Comes Kelly.

== Cast ==
- Jackie Moran as Jimmy Kelly
- Wanda McKay as Anne Mason
- Sidney Miller as Sammy Cohn
- Ralph Sanford as Police Lt. Marty Phillips
- Dewey Robinson as Detective Delaney
- Jan Wiley as Rita Wilson aka Gladys Wharton
- Anthony Warde as Bob Farrell
- Harry Depp as J. B. Hastings
- George Eldredge as John Quigley
- Edward Emerson as Martin
- Gladys Blake as Stella - Switchboard Operator
- Jon Gilbreath as Tex Barton
- Pat Gleason as Pringle
- Donald Kerr as Bowers
- Charles Jordan as Wallis
- Terry Frost as Dick Stevens - Orchestra Leader
- Ralph Linn as Norris

== Bibliography ==
- Etling, Laurence. Radio in the Movies: A History and Filmography, 1926–2010. McFarland, 2011.
- Fetrow, Alan G. Feature Films, 1940-1949: a United States Filmography. McFarland, 1994.
- Miller, Don. "B" Movies: An Informal Survey of the American Low-budget Film, 1933-1945. Curtis Books, 1973.
