= The Last Ride (1944 film) =

1944 film

- Directed by: D. Ross Lederman
- Screenplay by: Raymond L. Schrock
- Starring: Richard Travis; Charles Lang; Eleanor Parker
- Cinematography: James Van Trees; A.S.C.
- Edited by: Harold McLernon
- Music by: William Lava
- Production company: A Warner Bros. - First National Picture
- Distributed by: Warner Bros. Pictures Inc.
- Release date: October 7, 1944
- Running time: 57 minutes
- Country: United States
- Language: English
- Budget: $103,000
- Box office: $257,000

The Last Ride is a 1944 American crime film directed by D. Ross Lederman. According to Warner Bros. accounts the film earned $249,000 domestically and $8,000 foreign.

== Plot ==
The film, made during World War II, is about a "tire bootlegging" ring. The United States was largely cut off from foreign rubber supplies during the war, so tires and other rubber products were rationed on the home front. The bootleggers trafficked in rubber on the black market. As part of that, they stole good tires off people's cars, then made and sold almost worthless tires that looked good but contained very little real rubber.

In the story, after a set of fake tires causes a fatal crash, police launch a murder investigation. Detective Pat Harrigan is assigned to lead the probe. Two people are able to identify the men who sold the illegal goods, but the criminals kill these witnesses by planting a car bomb, making it impossible to take the case to court.

Pat, the detective, is living in a house owned by Kitty Kelly and her mother. Pat's brother Mike has been dating Kitty, but both Pat and Kitty are concerned about Mike's apparent sympathy for criminals. They talk to him about how tire bootleggers are harming innocent people and undermining the war effort, but their words seem to fall on deaf ears.

To break the case, Pat pretends to be dishonest, accepts a bribe from the gang and gets himself fired from the department. He's actually working undercover, infiltrating the gang and trying to find the mastermind who operates in the shadows. Everyone who knows Pat is shocked at his apparent turn to criminality, and even his cynical brother begins to feel pangs of conscience.

When Pat uncovers the truth about the kingpin, his life is in great danger, and Mike must decide where his own true loyalties lie.

== Cast ==
- Richard Travis as Detective Lt. Pat Harrigan
- Charles Lang as Mike Harrigan
- Eleanor Parker as Kitty Kelly
- Jack LaRue as Joe Genna
- Cy Kendall as Capt. Butler
- Wade Boteler as Police Chief Delaney
- Mary Gordon as Mrs. Mary Kelly
- Harry Lewis as Harry Bronson

Uncredited (in order of appearance)
Virginia Patton	Hazel Dale, Harry Bronson's girlfriend, who dances the conga line with Harry, Joe Taylor and Joe's girlfriend, Molly Stevens
Dolores Moran	Molly Stevens, Joe Taylor's girlfriend, who dances the conga line with Joe, Harry Branson and Harry's girlfriend, Hazel Dale
Michael Ames	Fritz Hummel, tire bootlegger, who delivers tires to Joe Taylor
Stuart Holmes	Maltby, Joe Taylor's elderly butler, who cautions that Joe's father left instructions not to drink and drive
Creighton Hale	air raid warden who comes to the house of Mrs. Mary Kelly, the mother of Kitty Kelly
Elliott Sullivan	tire expert who examines the substandard tire which caused the car accident that killed Joe Taylor and Molly Stevens
Howard Hickman	Mr. Bronson, Harry Bronson's father who asks him, "Harry, do you have to lie?"
Leah Baird	Mrs. Bronson, Harry Bronson's mother who asks him, "What are you afraid of, dear?"
Pat O'Malley	O'Rorke, old police officer pretending to buy bootleg tires when Fritz Hummel arrives at his home
John Maxwell	Sidney Drake, mob lawyer who arranges bail for Fritz Hummel as soon as he is brought to the police precinct
Bill Kennedy	Slim Correlli, tire bootlegger, who is arrested with Fritz Hummel
Jack Mower	Detective Shannon, assigned to guard Harry Bronson and Hazel Dale
Clancy Cooper	Sergeant Naylor who, along with Detective Shannon, is assigned to guard Harry Bronson and Hazel Dale
