= Up in the Air (1940 film) =

1940 film

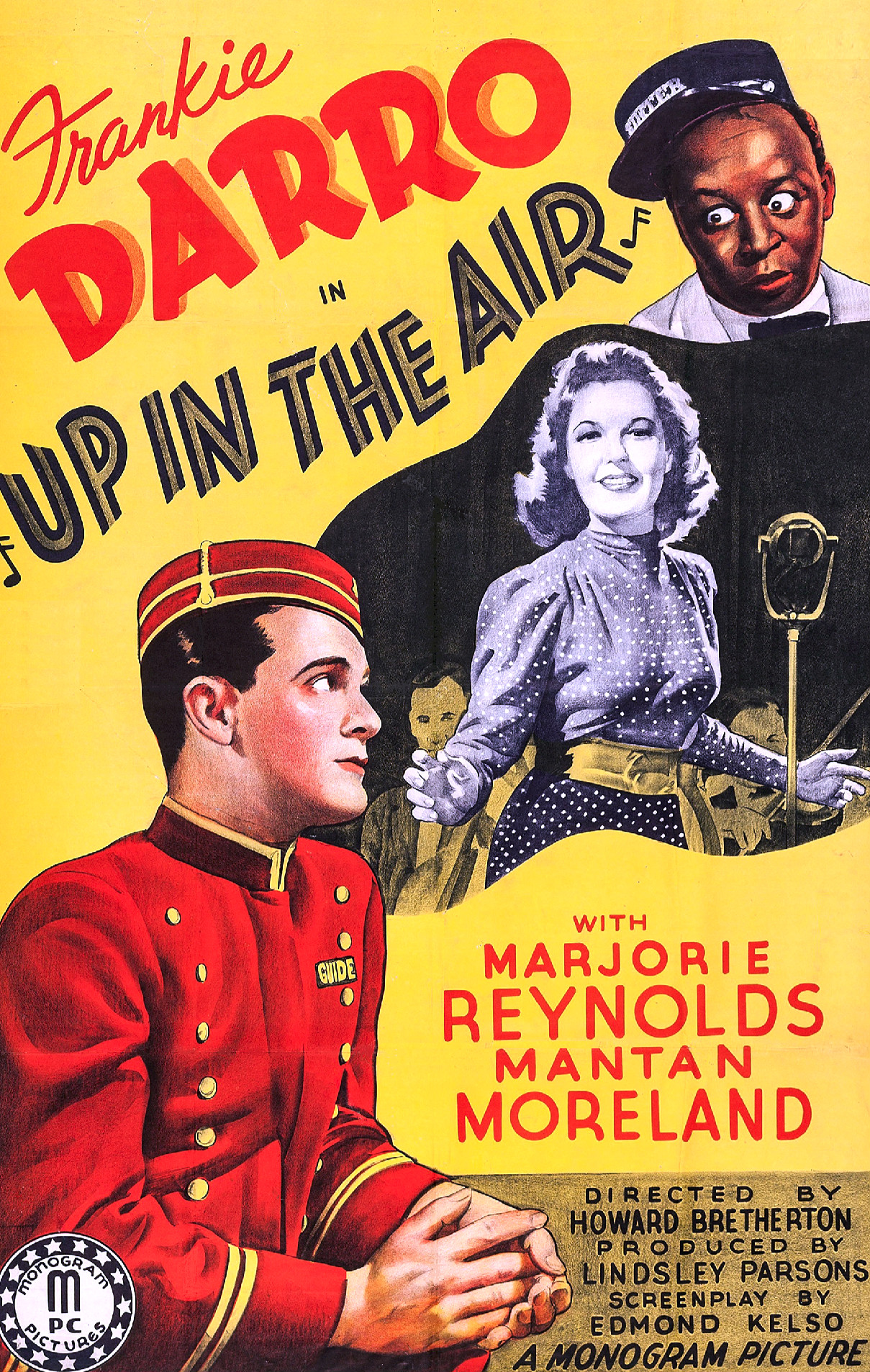
- Film poster
- Directed by: Howard Bretherton
- Written by: Edmond Kelso (original story and screenplay)
- Produced by: Lindsley Parsons (producer)
- Starring: Frankie Darro; Marjorie Reynolds; Mantan Moreland
- Cinematography: Fred Jackman Jr.
- Edited by: Jack Ogilvie
- Music by: Edward J. Kay
- Production company: Monogram Pictures
- Distributed by: Monogram Pictures
- Release date: September 9, 1940
- Running time: 62 minutes
- Country: United States
- Language: English

Up in the Air is a 1940 American comedy mystery film directed by Howard Bretherton and starring Frankie Darro, Marjorie Reynolds and Mantan Moreland. It was produced and released by Monogram Pictures. It was remade in 1945 as There Goes Kelly.

== Plot summary ==
Frankie Ryan works as a page boy at a radio station in Hollywood. His friend Jeff works in the same place, but as a porter. Their dream is to perform as radio comedians on the air, with their own show. However, they have not yet convinced anyone of their great sense of humor. When they try to help the station receptionist Anne Mason by setting up a false audition for a singer, they are almost fired for their antics.

The station has financial problems related to their current moody singer Rita Wilson and tries to get rid of her. Rita is shot and killed during a blackout when she is rehearsing for a broadcast.

Police detectives Phillips and Delaney arrive at the scene, and despite not finding the murder weapon, they suspect wannabe cowboy singer Tex Barton, who tried to slip out the back door after the shooting. He was in the audience when Rita was rehearsing before the blackout.

Station producer Bob Farrell is also afraid of being suspected, as he had an argument with Rita not long before the shooting. He asks Frankie, who overheard the discussion, to withhold the information from the police. In gratitude, Farrell promises to afford Anne a real audition as a singer to take Rita's place.

Frankie soon finds the weapon used to shoot Rita hidden in a ventilator duct. The gun belongs to Tex and had been used in a prior shooting by a woman named Gladys Wharton. When Frankie and Jeff audition for a comedy spot on the air, with Frankie in blackface as a disguise, the police come looking for Tex. Later, Tex is found murdered in the office of the station owner.

Frankie and Jeff investigate of their own and search Tex's room but find only a picture of Anne, suggesting that her real name is Gladys. Anne is therefore suspected of the murder and arrested by the police, but later makes bail and is released.

Frankie discovers from a radio station in Cheyenne that Gladys was a blonde woman who was married to Tex and fell in love with one of her superiors. Because Anne is a true brunette, Frankie concludes that Rita, not Anne, could be Gladys.

When the station executives are gathered in one room by the police, one of them named Van Martin draws a gun and confesses to both crimes. When Jeff enters the room unannounced, he accidentally knocks the gun out of Martin's hand and the police arrest Martin.

== Cast ==
- Frankie Darro as Frankie Ryan
- Marjorie Reynolds as Anne Mason
- Mantan Moreland as Jeff Jefferson
- Gordon Jones as Tex Barton
- Lorna Gray as Singer Rita Wilson aka Gladys Wharton
- Tristram Coffin as Bob Farrell
- Clyde Dilson as Detective Lt. Marty Phillips
- Dick Elliott as B. J. Hastings, Station Owner
- John Holland as Sam Quigley
- Carleton Young as Band Leader Dick Stevens
- Alex Callam as Van Martin - Announcer
- Maxine Leslie as Stella - Switchboard Operator
- Ralph Peters as Detective Delaney
- Jack Mather as Tim Wallace - Comic
- Dennis Moore as Gag Writer Pringle
- Phil Kramer as Gag Writer

== Soundtrack ==
- Lorna Gray - "Doin' the Conga" (Written by Johnny Lange, Lew Porter and Edward J. Kay)
- Marjorie - "Doin' the Conga" (Written by Johnny Lange, Lew Porter and Edward J. Kay)
- Marjorie Reynolds - "By the Looks of Things" (Written by Harry Tobias and Edward J. Kay)
- Marjorie Reynolds - "Somehow or Other" (Written by Harry Tobias and Edward J. Kay)
- Gordon Jones - "Oh, Bury Me Not on the Lone Prairie"
