= Wanda McKay =

American actress (1915–1996)

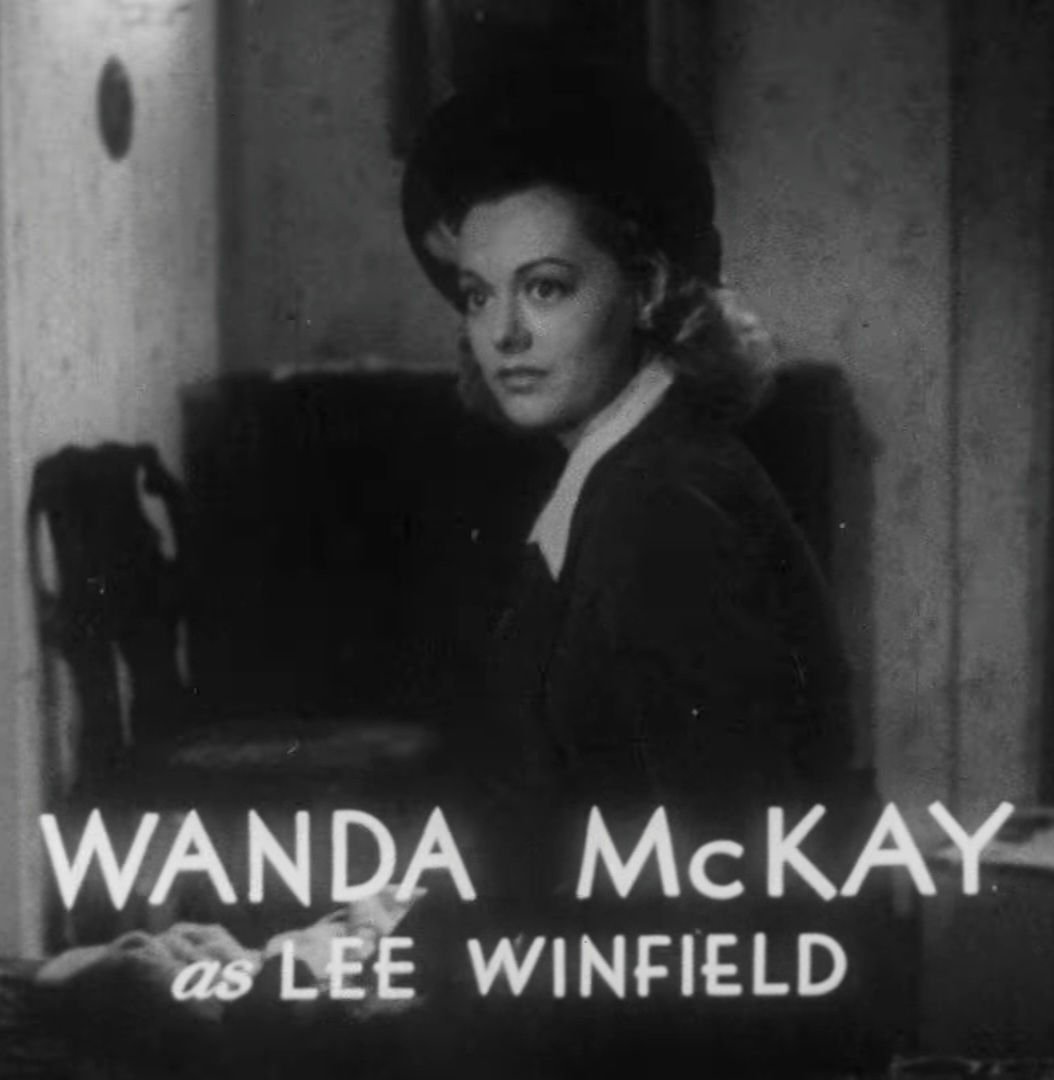
- Mckay in The Black Raven (1943)
- Born: Dorothy Quackenbush; June 22, 1915; Portland, Oregon, U.S.
- Died: April 11, 1996 (aged 80); Rancho Mirage, California, U.S.
- Occupations: Actress; model
- Years active: 1939–1957
- Spouse: Hoagy Carmichael (m. 1977; died 1981)

Wanda McKay (born Dorothy Quackenbush; June 22, 1915 – April 11, 1996) was an American actress and model.

== Early years ==
McKay was born as Dorothy Quackenbush in Portland, Oregon, (Note: McKay's obituary in the Los Angeles Times says that she was "born Dorothy McKay ...".) but her family later moved to Fort Worth in Texas. After moving to New York she became a model and her image was used to promote Chesterfield cigarettes.

In 1938, McKay represented Trans World Airlines, for which she worked as a hostess, in a beauty competition at the Birmingham Air Show. She won, being voted "Miss American Aviation".

== Career ==
By 1939 McKay had moved into films after being given a contract by Paramount Pictures. Initially she made small uncredited appearances before going on to starring roles as a leading lady in many B Movies during the 1940s, working in particular at studios such as PRC and Monogram Pictures. Film work dried up for her in the 1950s, and she appeared on television and in a minor role in The Merry Widow (1952). Her last film appearance was a small uncredited part in Ten Thousand Bedrooms (1957). She also appeared in an episode of The Lone Ranger (TV series) in 1951 titled ''Trouble at Black Rock''.

== Personal life ==
In 1977 she married Hoagy Carmichael, a marriage that lasted until his death in 1981.

== Death ==
On April 11, 1996, McKay died of cancer in Los Angeles. She was 80.

== Partial filmography ==
- $1000 a Touchdown (1939) - Babe (uncredited)
- Our Neighbors – The Carters (1939) - Usherette (uncredited)
- All Women Have Secrets (1939) - Jessie
- The Farmer's Daughter (1940) - Cashier (uncredited)
- Those Were the Days! (1940) - Minor Role (uncredited)
- The Way of All Flesh (1940) - Cigarette Girl (uncredited)
- The Great McGinty (1940) - Bit Role (uncredited)
- Mystery Sea Raider (1940) - Lois (uncredited)
- The Quarterback (1940) - Blonde (uncredited)
- Dancing on a Dime (1940) - Lulu
- Life with Henry (1940) - Girl on Theatre Stage (uncredited)
- A Night at Earl Carroll's (1940) - Girl in Steve's Party (uncredited)
- Love Thy Neighbor (1940) - Showgirl (uncredited)
- Virginia (1941) - Girl (uncredited)
- The Mad Doctor (1941) - Girl at Charity Bazaar (uncredited)
- You're the One (1941) - Girl
- The Lady Eve (1941) - Daughter on Ship (uncredited)
- Las Vegas Nights (1941) - Cigarette Girl (uncredited)
- The Pioneers (1941) - Suzanna Ames
- Twilight on the Trail (1941) - Lucy Brent
- New York Town (1941) - Minor Role (uncredited)
- The Royal Mounted Patrol (1941) - Betty Duvalle
- Rolling Down the Great Divide (1942) - Rita
- The Lone Rider in Texas Justice (1942) - Kate Stewart
- One Thrilling Night (1942) - Millie Jason
- Law and Order (1942) - Linda Fremont
- Bowery at Midnight (1942) - Judy Malvern
- Corregidor (1943) - Nurse Jane 'Hey-Dutch' Van Dornen
- The Black Raven (1943) - Lee Winfield
- Let's Face It (1943) - Chorus Girl (uncredited)
- Danger! Women at Work (1943) - Doris Bendix
- Deerslayer (1943) - Hetty Hutter
- Smart Guy (1943) - Jean Wickers
- What a Man! (1944) - Joan Rankin
- Voodoo Man (1944) - Betty
- The Monster Maker (1944) - Patricia
- Raiders of Ghost City (1944, Serial) - Cathy Haines
- Leave It to the Irish (1944) - Nora O'Brien
- Belle of the Yukon (1944) - Cherie Atterbury
- There Goes Kelly (1945) - Anne Mason
- Hollywood and Vine (1945) - Martha Manning
- Sensation Hunters (1945) - Helen
- Kilroy Was Here (1947) - Connie Harcourt
- Jiggs and Maggie in Society (1947) - Millicent Perker
- Stage Struck (1948) - Helen Howard
- Jinx Money (1948) - Virginia
- Jungle Goddess (1948) - Greta Vanderhorn
- The Golden Eye (1948) - Evelyn Manning
- The Story of Life (1948)
- Because of Eve (1948) - Sally Stephens
- A Woman of Distinction (1950) - Merle - Shop Girl (uncredited)
- Roaring City (1951) - Sylvia Rand
- The Merry Widow (1952) - Girl at Maxim's (uncredited)
- Ten Thousand Bedrooms (1957) - New York Operator (uncredited) (final film role)

== Bibliography ==
- Raw, Laurance. Character Actors in Horror and Science Fiction Films, 1930–1960. McFarland, 2012.
