= One Thrilling Night =

1942 film by William Beaudine

- Original film poster
- Directed by: William Beaudine
- Written by: Joseph Hoffman (original screenplay)
- Produced by: A.W. Hackel
- Starring: John Beal; Wanda McKay
- Cinematography: Marcel Le Picard
- Edited by: Martin G. Cohn
- Music by: Frank Sanucci
- Distributed by: Monogram Pictures
- Release date: 5 June 1942
- Running time: 69 minutes
- Country: United States
- Language: English

One Thrilling Night is a 1942 American film directed by William Beaudine. The film is also known as Horace Takes Over (American TV title) with working titles being Do Not Disturb and Army Bride.

== Plot ==
The newlywed country bumpkins from Connecticut, Mr. and Mrs. Horace Jason (John Beal and Wanda McKay), check into the Hotel Clarke in New York City, prepared to spend their first night together as a married couple. It is also their first and last night before Horace joins the Army.

The couple decides to buy some champagne and celebrate. Horace leaves to buy the bottle while Millie dims the lights and changes clothes in the bedroom. Pete Mooney (Ernie Adams) and Joe Richmond (Lynton Brent) enter through a window, pull the unconscious body of Duke Keesler (Pierce Lynden) from under the bed and frisk him on the mattress until Horace returns.

Mooney and Richmond hurriedly cover the body and duck under the bed. Horace and Millie discover the body and run down the hall to enlist the help of the hotel detective, Pat Callahan (Warren Hymer). While they are gone, Mooney and Richmond stuff the body into Millie's empty trunk, then escape out the window. When Horace and Millie return again, the body is gone, so Callahan leaves in a huff.

Horace opens the trunk and the body of Keesler falls out. Horace and Millie run to get Callahan, but Keesler is alive, awakens and escapes out of the window. Millie and Horace re-create what they found, accidentally locking Horace in the trunk. Callahan and Millie leave to get spare keys and an axe to get Horace out. While they are away, Richmond and Mooney reappear and take the trunk away.

Mooney and Richmond take the trunk to Frankie Saxton (Tom Neal), a gangster looking for Keesler regarding a stolen $50,000. Mooney and Richmond leave Saxton with the case, thinking Keesler is still in it. The trunk is opened and Horace tries to explain a mistake has been made. Saxton, along with Skinny (Gene O’Donnell), Tubby (Jim O’Gatty), and Dotty (Barbara Pepper), think that Horace is Duke wearing a disguise. Horace escapes and runs down the street, only to be arrested for indecency and returned to the hotel.

Millie and Horace are snatched and coaxed to get into a car. They dodge the gangsters and hide in a movie theater, catching the tail end of the film with the lights coming on for a contest. Horace wins a prize before the audience departs. As he's on stage, Millie is taken away by the gangsters. Dotty meets up with a frantic Horace and takes him to the rest of the gangster group, where they discover Horace really isn't the Duke. They tie and gag he and Millie.

To get attention, Horace turns on the radio, which happens to be turned to a gangster show. Neighbors think the mayhem and threats are for real. The police arrive and take the couple back to their hotel room. The real Duke's body is stuffed into the closet. Horace discovers it as he puts his robe away, with the 50 grand in his robe pocket. Frankie Saxton and the gang enter, but end up taken to jail. Millie and Horace are left, finally, to be alone in their room. Right before calling it a night, their 6 AM wakeup call arrives. They have to check out.

== Cast ==
- John Beal as Horace Jason
- Wanda McKay as Millie Jason
- Warren Hymer as Pat Callahan
- J. Farrell MacDonald as Police Sergeant Haggerty
- Barbara Pepper as Lettie
- Tom Neal as Frankie Saxton
- Ernie Adams as Pete Mooney
- Lynton Brent as Joe Richmond
- Pierce Lyden as Duke Keesler
- Gene O'Donnell as Skinny
- Jimmy O'Gatty as Tubby
- Tom Herbert as Hotel Clerk
