= The Black Raven =

1943 American film

- Directed by: Sam Newfield
- Written by: Fred Myton
- Produced by: Sigmund Neufeld
- Starring: George Zucco; Wanda McKay; Robert Livingston
- Cinematography: Robert E. Cline
- Edited by: Holbrook N. Todd
- Distributed by: Producers Releasing Corporation
- Release date: May 21, 1943
- Running time: 61 minutes
- Country: United States
- Language: English

The Black Raven is a 1943 American mystery film directed by Sam Newfield. It was produced and released by Producers Releasing Corporation, a leading Poverty Row studio.

== Plot ==
A heavy storm catches everybody, nearly all with good reasons for fleeing the US, at the Black Raven motel just across the U.S./Canada border, and one of them winds up dead. The motel is run by a Mr. Bradford, who seems to have a sinister past. The others are an escaped convict with plans on Bradford's life, a bank employee who has embezzled $50,000, a young couple that has eloped and, for comic relief, a not-too-bright county sheriff.

While Bradford is hardly a saint, he suspects the murderer is planning to frame him for the crime. When the irate and disagreeable father of the eloping woman turns up, Bradford sacrifices his life to catch the murderer and see to it that the eloping couple can start a new life with his stash of money.

== Cast ==
- George Zucco as Amos Bradford aka The Raven
- Wanda McKay as Lee Winfield
- Robert Livingston as Allen Bentley
- Noel Madison as Mike Bardoni
- Byron Foulger as Horace Weatherby
- Charles B. Middleton as Sheriff
- Robert Middlemass as Tim Winfield
- Glenn Strange as Andy
- I. Stanford Jolley as Whitey Cole
- Jimmy Aubrey appears uncredited as Roadblock Watchman.

== Critical reception ==
Leonard Maltin called the film a "paltry (and obvious) whodunit," awarding it 1.5 out of 4 Stars.
