= Follow the Leader (1944 film) =

1944 film by William Beaudine

- Directed by: William Beaudine
- Screenplay by: William Beaudine; Beryl Sachs
- Story by: Ande Lamb
- Produced by: Jack Dietz; Sam Katzman
- Starring: See below
- Cinematography: Marcel Le Picard
- Edited by: Carl Pierson
- Production company: Monogram Pictures
- Release date: 1944
- Running time: 65 minutes
- Country: United States
- Language: English

Follow the Leader is a 1944 American film directed by William Beaudine featuring the East Side Kids.

== Plot ==
As he and Glimpy Freedhoff anxiously anticipate their furlough home, Muggs McGinnis is summoned to the colonel's office and informed that he is to be honorably discharged because of poor eyesight. At home in the Bowery, Muggs is tearfully telling his proud mother about his discharge when Glimpy bursts into the apartment with the news that Danny has been jailed.

Determined to exonerate their friend, Muggs and Glimpy proceed to the clubhouse and are welcomed by their pals. There they meet Spider, a new club member who was working with Danny at a warehouse when he was arrested. Muggs and Glimpy then go to the jailhouse to question Danny. Becoming suspicious when Danny tells them that soon after Spider arranged for him to work at the warehouse, he was charged with stealing alcohol earmarked for the Army, Muggs goes to the warehouse to investigate. After observing Fingers Belmont, a troublemaker who had been expelled from their club, hand fifty dollars to Spider, Muggs invites Spider to a "party" at the clubhouse that night. When Spider arrives, Muggs orders the other boys to leave the room. Claiming that he was dishonorably discharged, Muggs then tells Spider that he wants to join the hijackers, and Spider confides that Fingers pays him to unbolt the back door to the warehouse. As Muggs and Spider leave the clubhouse for the night, Spider admits to Muggs that the only reason he took up the job with the crooks was in order to have money to take care of his ill mother. Meanwhile, Fingers had overheard Spider's earlier confession and, once Spider is alone, drags him back to the clubhouse and beats him to death.

When Spider's body is found there, suspicion falls on Muggs, and Glimpy hurries to warn his friend that the police are looking for him. Determined to clear his name and expose the mastermind behind the hijackers, Muggs approaches Major Kline of military intelligence and offers to work undercover to solve the case. Meanwhile, Fingers' boss Larry, the owner of Maxie's Club, becomes disturbed when he reads about Spider's murder in the newspaper. Major Kline then introduces Muggs to Captain Baker of the police department, and when the two law enforcement officials decide to accept his proposal, Muggs finds Fingers and threatens to expose him to the police unless he is allowed to join the hijackers.

After Fingers directs Muggs to meet him at Maxie's Club the next evening, Muggs convenes a meeting of the club members. Appealing to the boys for help in apprehending the thieves, Muggs instructs Glimpy to wait for his phone call at Ginsberg's delicatessen the next evening and then assemble the other members. When one of the boys finds a bloodied tie clip on the floor bearing the initials "WWB," Muggs realizes that it must belong to Spider's killer. At Maxie's the next night, Muggs asks his sister Milly, who works as a cigarette girl there, to phone Ginsberg's delicatessen if anything strange happens.

As the boys await Muggs's call, Fingers and Muggs row out to a warehouse on the docks and load some stolen crates onto their boat. After delivering the crates to Maxie's storeroom, Muggs starts an argument with Fingers and knocks him unconscious. In the fray, Finger's hat flies off his head and Muggs sees the initials "WWB" inscribed on the band. Upon regaining consciousness, Fingers knocks Muggs down and races to warn Larry about Muggs's double-cross. Overhearing their conversation, Milly notifies Glimpy at the delicatessen and Glimpy then rallies the boys waiting at the clubhouse.

After Fingers returns to the storehouse, Milly enters Larry's office and begins to flirt with him, stalling for time. When Glimpy and the others burst into Maxie's storeroom, Fingers rushes back to Larry's office and there recognizes Milly as Muggs's sister. At that moment, Muggs and the boys come to Milly's rescue and apprehend Larry and Fingers. For their heroism, Muggs is reinstated into the Army as a sergeant and Glimpy is promoted to the rank of corporal.

== Cast ==
=== The East Side Kids ===
- Leo Gorcey as Ethelbert 'Muggs' McGinnis
- Huntz Hall as Glimpy Freedhoff
- David Durand as Danny
- Bobby Stone as Speed (a.k.a. Skinny)
- Jimmy Strand as Dave
- Buddy Gorman as James Aloysius 'Skinny' Bogerty
- Ernest Morrison as Scruno (dream sequence only) (uncredited)

=== Additional cast ===
- Gabriel Dell as W.W. 'Fingers' Belmont
- Billy Benedict as Spider O'Brien
- Joan Marsh as Milly McGinnis
- Jack La Rue as Larry
- Mary Gordon as Mrs. McGinnis
- J. Farrell MacDonald as Clancy, Policeman
- Gene Austin as Himself
- The Sherrell Sisters as Themselves
- Bernard Gorcey as Ginsberg (uncredited)
- Bryant Washburn as Colonel (uncredited)
- Marie Windsor as Native Girl (dream sequence only) (uncredited)

== See also ==
- List of American films of 1944
