= Never a Dull Moment (1943 film) =

1943 American comedy film

- Theatrical release poster
- Directed by: Edward C. Lilley
- Screenplay by: Mel Ronson; Stanley Roberts
- Story by: Stanley Roberts
- Produced by: Howard Benedict
- Starring: Ritz Brothers; Frances Langford; Mary Beth Hughes; Franklin Pangborn; Stuart Crawford; George Zucco; Elisabeth Risdon; Jack La Rue
- Cinematography: Charles Van Enger
- Edited by: Paul Landres
- Music by: H. J. Salter
- Production company: Universal Pictures
- Distributed by: Universal Pictures
- Release date: November 19, 1943
- Running time: 60 minutes
- Country: United States
- Language: English

Never a Dull Moment is a 1943 American comedy film directed by Edward C. Lilley and written by Mel Ronson and Stanley Roberts. The film stars Ritz Brothers, Frances Langford, Mary Beth Hughes, Franklin Pangborn, Stuart Crawford, George Zucco, Elisabeth Risdon and Jack La Rue. The film was released on November 19, 1943, by Universal Pictures.

== Plot ==
Harry, Jimmy, and Al Ritz portray three vaudevillians ("The Three Funny Bunnies! The only act in show business that lays Easter eggs!"). Mobster Tony Rocco (George Zucco) mistakes them for gangsters and hires them for his nightclub. The Ritzes are unaware that they are expected to steal a valuable necklace from a society matron. When a pickpocket (Mary Beth Hughes) plants the jewelry on Harry, the Funny Bunnies escape, and are hunted both by the police and Rocco's gang.

== Cast ==
- Al Ritz (one of the Ritz Brothers) as Al
- Jimmy Ritz (one of the Ritz Brothers) as Jimmy
- Harry Ritz (one of the Ritz Brothers) as Harry
- Frances Langford as Julie Russell
- Mary Beth Hughes as Flo Parker
- Franklin Pangborn as Sylvester
- Stuart Crawford as Dick Manning
- George Zucco as Tony Rocco
- Elisabeth Risdon as Mrs. Schuyler Manning III
- Jack La Rue as Joey
- Sammy Stein as Romeo
- Barbara Brown as Mrs. Lizzie Van Drake
- Douglas Wood as Commodore Barclay
- Charles Jordan as Detective Murphy
- John Sheehan as Bartender
- George Chandler as Lunch Counter Patron
- Eddie Dunn as Capt. Fogarty
- The Rogers Dancers (Dorothy Rogers, George Rogers, Don Kramer) as Comic Adagio Act
- Grace Poggi and Igor Dega as Exhibition Dancers

== Reception ==
Never a Dull Moment received some of the best notices of the Ritz Brothers' careers. Film Daily: "Ritz Brothers prove a riot in their best picture in a long time. It's never any less than extremely funny. In fact, at times it's positively uproarious... Put this down as a fast-moving musical that hits the bull's eye. Considering that the Ritzes are at their best, nothing less could have been expected." Showmen's Trade Review: "Although the plot is as old as the hills, the Ritz Brothers bring it up to date with some very funny comedy material... The weight of the film is carried by the Ritz Brothers' antics with the accent on hokum, but as usual the speed with which they work keeps the show rolling at a lively clip." Variety: "Geared for twin bills, Never a Dull Moment is first-rate light, musical entertainment, strong as supporting picture on most dualers [double-feature programs], with Ritz Brothers and Frances Langford providing the marquee lustre. Ritzes work better and with brighter material than they've had for some time."

The Ritz Brothers had been signed by Universal Pictures in 1940 for a single picture. Two years later they were approached to make three hourlong musical comedies for the studio's B-picture unit. Never a Dull Moment was the last of the three and, despite its excellent reviews, did not result in any further pictures. The Ritzes left Hollywood for good, concentrating on their live nightclub act and personal appearances. They continued as a headline attraction until Al Ritz's death in 1965.
