= George Zucco =

British actor (1886–1960)

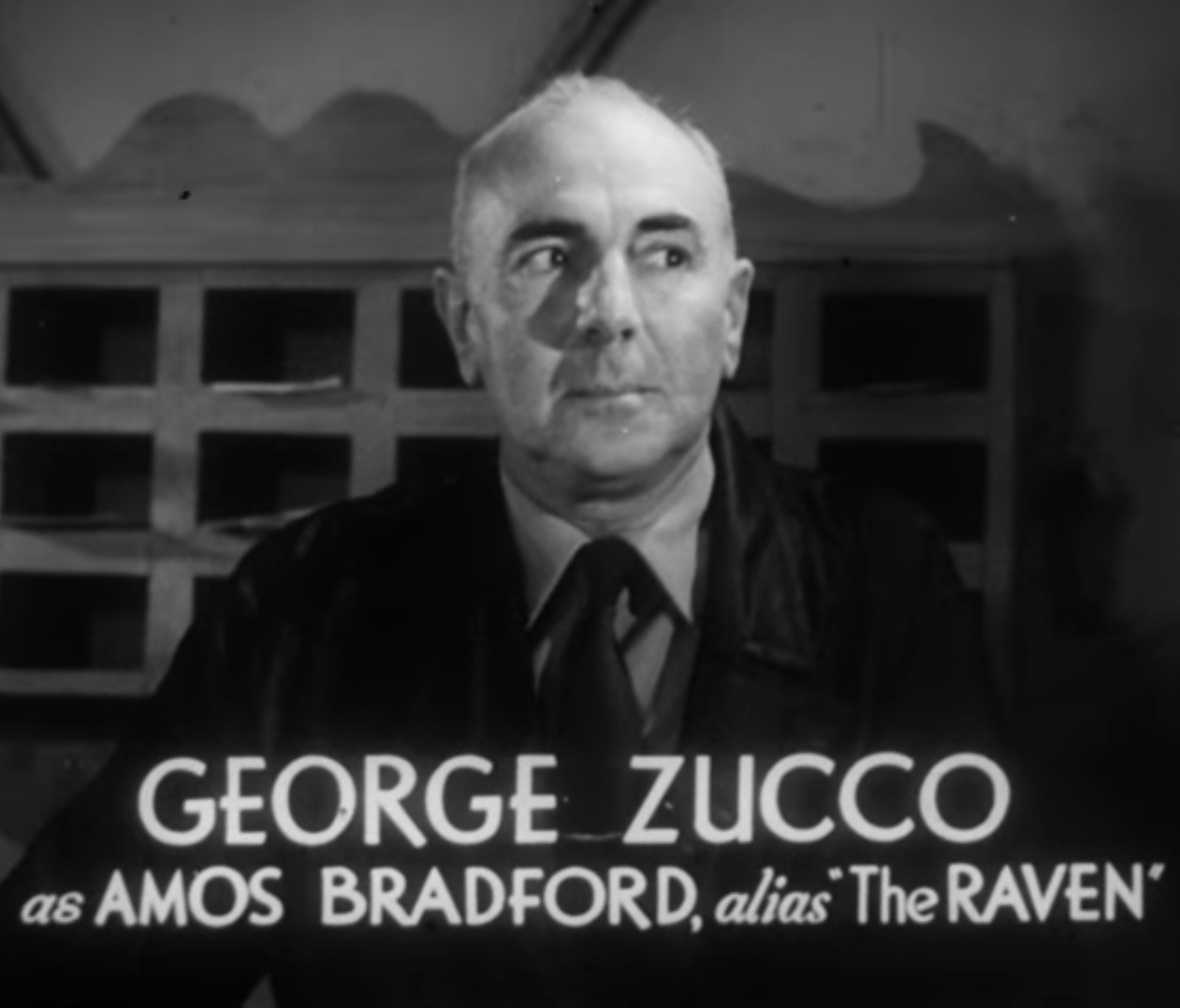
- The Black Raven (1943)
- Born: 11 January 1886; Manchester, Lancashire, England, UK
- Died: 27 May 1960 (aged 74); Hollywood, California, US
- Resting place: Forest Lawn Memorial Park, Hollywood Hills
- Occupation: Actor
- Years active: 1907–1951
- Spouse: Stella Francis (m. 1930)
- Children: 1

George Zucco (11 January 1886 – 27 May 1960) was a British character actor who appeared in plays and 96 films, mostly American-made, during a career spanning over two decades, from the 1920s to 1951. In his films, he often played a suave villain, a member of nobility, or a mad doctor.

== Early life and family ==
George Desylla Zucco was born in Manchester, Lancashire, on 11 January 1886. His mother Marian (née Rintoul) ran a dressmaking business. His father, George De Sylla Zucco, was a Greek merchant from Corfu who became a naturalised British subject in 1865.

Zucco debuted on the Canadian stage in 1908 in a stock theater company.

He returned to the UK and served as a lieutenant in the British Army's West Yorkshire Regiment during the First World War. He lost the use of two fingers when he was shot in the right arm in France. When the war ended, he studied at the Royal Academy of Dramatic Art and later taught there.

He became a leading stage actor of the 1920s, and made his film debut as Eugène Godefroy Cavaignac in The Dreyfus Case (1931), a British film dramatising the Dreyfus Affair.

== Career ==
Zucco returned to the United States in 1935 to play Benjamin Disraeli in Victoria Regina, and appeared with Gary Cooper and George Raft in Souls at Sea (1937).

He played Professor Moriarty in The Adventures of Sherlock Holmes (1939), opposite Basil Rathbone as Sherlock Holmes and Nigel Bruce as Dr. Watson. Zucco earned a reputation as a bespectacled, nefarious character in films such as After the Thin Man, Fast Company, Arrest Bulldog Drummond, Charlie Chan in Honolulu, The Cat and the Canary, and My Favorite Blonde.

During the 1940s, he took every role he was offered, landing himself in B-films and Universal horror films, including The Mummy's Hand (1940), The Mummy's Tomb (1942), The Mad Monster (1942), The Mad Ghoul (1943), Dead Men Walk (1943), The Mummy's Ghost (1944), House of Frankenstein (1944), and Tarzan and the Mermaids (1948). He was reunited with Basil Rathbone in another Sherlock Holmes adventure, Sherlock Holmes in Washington, this time playing not Moriarty, but a Nazi spy.

== Last years and death ==
After playing a bit part in David and Bathsheba (1951), Zucco undertook a role in The Desert Fox, but suffered a stroke one day on the set, and never significantly recovered (he was replaced by Cedric Hardwicke). He suffered from stroke-induced dementia for the rest of his life, and he died on 27 May 1960 from pneumonia in a nursing facility in Hollywood, aged 74.

== Personal life ==
He and his wife, Stella Francis, had a daughter, Frances (1931–1962), who died of throat cancer at age 30, and a grandson, George Zucco (né Canto). Stella Zucco died from natural causes on May 11, 1999, aged 99, in Woodland Hills, California.

== Filmography ==
- Dreyfus (1931) as Cavaignac (film debut)
- There Goes the Bride (1932) as Prosecutor (uncredited)
- The Midshipmaid (1932) as Lord Dore
- The Good Companions (1933) as Fauntley
- The Roof (1933) as James Renton
- The Man from Toronto (1933) as Squire
- Autumn Crocus (1934) as Reverend Mayne
- Something Always Happens (1934) as Proprietor of the Maison de Paris (uncredited)
- The Lady Is Willing (1934) as Man from Reclamation Agent (uncredited)
- What Happened Then? (1934) as Inspector Hull
- What's in a Name? (1934) as Foot
- Road House (1934) as Hotel Manager (uncredited)
- Abdul the Damned (1935) as Officer of the Firing Squad
- It's a Bet (1935) as Convict (uncredited)
- The Common Round (1936, Short) as Dr. Pyke
- The Man Who Could Work Miracles (1936) as The Colonel's Butler
- Sinner Take All (1936) as Bascomb
- After the Thin Man (1936) as Dr. Kammer
- Parnell (1937) as Sir Charles Russell
- Saratoga (1937) as Dr. Harmsworth Bierd
- London by Night (1937) as Inspector Jefferson
- Souls at Sea (1937) as Barton Woodley
- The Firefly (1937) as Secret Service Chief
- Madame X (1937) as Dr. LaFarge
- The Bride Wore Red (1937) as Count Armalia
- Conquest (1937) as Sen. Malachowski (uncredited)
- Rosalie (1937) as General Maroff
- Arsène Lupin Returns (1938) as Prefect of Police
- Three Comrades (1938) as Dr. Plauten (uncredited)
- Lord Jeff (1938) as James 'Jim' Hampstead
- Fast Company (1938) as Otto Brockler
- Marie Antoinette (1938) as Governor of Conciergerie (uncredited)
- Vacation from Love (1938) as Dr. Waxton
- Suez (1938) as Prime Minister
- Arrest Bulldog Drummond (1938) as Rolf Alferson
- Charlie Chan in Honolulu (1938) as Dr. Cardigan
- Captain Fury (1939) as Arnold Trist
- The Magnificent Fraud (1939) as Dr. Luis Virgo
- The Adventures of Sherlock Holmes (1939) as Professor Moriarty
- Here I Am a Stranger (1939) as James K. Spaulding
- The Cat and the Canary (1939) as Lawyer Crosby
- The Hunchback of Notre Dame (1939) as Procurator
- New Moon (1940) as Vicomte Ribaud
- The Mummy's Hand (1940) as Andoheb
- Arise, My Love (1940) as Prison Governor
- Dark Streets of Cairo (1940) as Abbadi
- The Monster and the Girl (1941) as Dr. Parry
- Topper Returns (1941) as Dr. Jeris
- A Woman's Face (1941) as Defense Attorney
- International Lady (1941) as Webster
- Ellery Queen and the Murder Ring (1941) as Dr. Edwin L. Jannery
- My Favorite Blonde (1942) as Dr. Hugo Streger
- The Mad Monster (1942) as Dr. Cameron
- Halfway to Shanghai (1942) as Peter van Hoost
- Dr. Renault's Secret (1942) as Dr. Robert Renault
- The Mummy's Tomb (1942) as Andoheb
- The Black Swan (1942) as Lord Denby
- Dead Men Walk (1943) as Dr. Lloyd Clayton/Dr. Elwyn Clayton
- Sherlock Holmes in Washington (1943) as Stanley
- The Black Raven (1943) as Amos Bradford a.k.a. The Raven
- Holy Matrimony (1943) as Mr. Crepitude
- The Mad Ghoul (1943) as Dr. Alfred Morris
- Never a Dull Moment (1943) as Tony Rocco
- Voodoo Man (1944) as Nicholas
- The Mummy's Ghost (1944) as High Priest
- Return of the Ape Man (1944) as Ape Man (in some stills; it is not certain that he appears in any footage, however)
- The Seventh Cross (1944) as Fahrenburg
- Shadows in the Night (1944) as Frank Swift
- House of Frankenstein (1944) as Professor Bruno Lampini
- Fog Island (1945) as Leo Grainger
- Having Wonderful Crime (1945) as King a.k.a. The Great Movel
- Sudan (1945) as Horadef
- Midnight Manhunt (1945) as Jelke
- Week-End at the Waldorf (1945) as Bey of Aribajan
- Confidential Agent (1945) as Detective Geddes
- Hold That Blonde (1945) as Dr. Pavel Storasky
- The Flying Serpent (1946) as Prof. Andrew Forbes
- Scared to Death (1947) as Dr. Joseph Van Ee
- The Imperfect Lady (1947) as Mr. Mallam
- Moss Rose (1947) as Craxton - the butler
- Lured (1947) as Officer H. R. Barrett
- Desire Me (1947) as Father Donnard
- Where There's Life (1947) as Paul Stertorius
- Captain from Castile (1947) as Marquis De Carvajal
- Tarzan and the Mermaids (1948) as Palanth - The High Priest
- Who Killed Doc Robbin (1948) as Doc Hugo Robbin
- The Pirate (1948) as The Viceroy
- Secret Service Investigator (1948) as Otto Dagoff
- Joan of Arc (1948) as Constable of Clervaux
- The Secret Garden (1949) as Dr. Fortescue
- The Barkleys of Broadway (1949) as The Judge
- Madame Bovary (1949) as DuBocage
- Harbor of Lost Men (1950) as H.G. Danziger
- Let's Dance (1950) as Judge Mackenzie
- Flame of Stamboul (1951) as The Voice
- The First Legion (1951) as Father Robert Stuart
- David and Bathsheba (1951) as Egyptian Ambassador (final film) (uncredited)
