= Halfway to Shanghai =

1942 film directed by John Rawlins

- Theatrical release poster
- Directed by: John Rawlins
- Screenplay by: Stuart Palmer
- Produced by: Paul Malvern
- Starring: Kent Taylor; Irene Hervey; Henry Stephenson; J. Edward Bromberg; George Zucco; Charles Wagenheim
- Cinematography: John W. Boyle
- Edited by: Edward Curtiss
- Production company: Universal Pictures
- Distributed by: Universal Pictures
- Release date: September 18, 1942
- Running time: 62 minutes
- Country: United States
- Language: English

Halfway to Shanghai is a 1942 American adventure film directed by John Rawlins and written by Stuart Palmer. The film stars Kent Taylor, Irene Hervey, Henry Stephenson, J. Edward Bromberg, George Zucco and Charles Wagenheim. The film was released on September 18, 1942, by Universal Pictures.

== Plot ==
Jonathan Peale, a renegade Nazi spy, is aboard a Rangoon-bound train, carrying a map containing the locations of China's main munitions dumps. He is watched on the train by Gestapo agent Karl Zerta and his aide, Otto Van Shocht, who both fear that Peale may decide to sell the map to the highest bidder. Also aboard the train are civil engineer Alexander Barton and his former sweetheart, Vicki Nelson, who see each other for the first time in two years. Alexander has recently completed work on the construction of the Burma Road, and of the eight Americans who were assigned to that project, he is the only one still alive. Having assumed that her true love was killed along with the others, Vicki has agreed to a marriage with a rich rajah. The two rekindle their love and agree to meet later that night in Alexander's compartment, after Nicolas, the rajah's matrimonial scout and Vicki's personal guard, has fallen asleep.

Zerta and Otto soon find themselves in a poker game with Alexander, Jonathan and Colonel Blimpton, a retired British army officer. Realizing his dire predicament, Jonathan leaves the game early, then hides in Alexander's compartment. When Alexander discovers him there, he demands that Jonathan leave before Vicki's arrival. The desperate spy then knocks the engineer unconscious, only to have Zerta arrive moments later and kill him. The Gestapo men rearrange the evidence to make it appear that Alexander committed the murder. In the meantime, American aviator and newspaper correspondent Caroline Wrallins comes into the possession of Jonathan's prized map. When Zerta confronts her, Caroline states that, unlike most of her fellow Americans, she is a supporter of Adolf Hitler and his Nazi regime. Burmese police detective Yinpore, in his investigation of Jonathan's death, finally deduces that Zerta is the real murderer. Marion Mills, Caroline's brow-beaten secretary, tells the detective of her boss and Zerta's Nazi connections, and the map is recovered. Zerta and Otto are killed by the Burmese police as they attempt to escape, and Caroline is arrested. Alexander and Vicki then decide to take a boat back to America to start a new life together.

== Cast ==
- Kent Taylor as Alexander Barton
- Irene Hervey as Vicky Neilson
- Henry Stephenson as Colonel Algernon Blimpton
- J. Edward Bromberg as Major Vinpore
- George Zucco as Peter van Hoost
- Charles Wagenheim as Jonathan Peale
- Alexander Granach as Mr. Nikolas
- Lionel Royce as Otto von Schact
- Willie Fung as Mr. Wu
- Oscar O'Shea as Doctor McIntyre
- Charlotte Wynters as Caroline Rawlins
- Mary Gordon as Mrs. McIntyre
- Fay Helm as Marion Mills
- Frank Lackteen as Train Conductor
- Charles Stevens as Ali
