= Tod Andrews =

American actor (1914–1972)

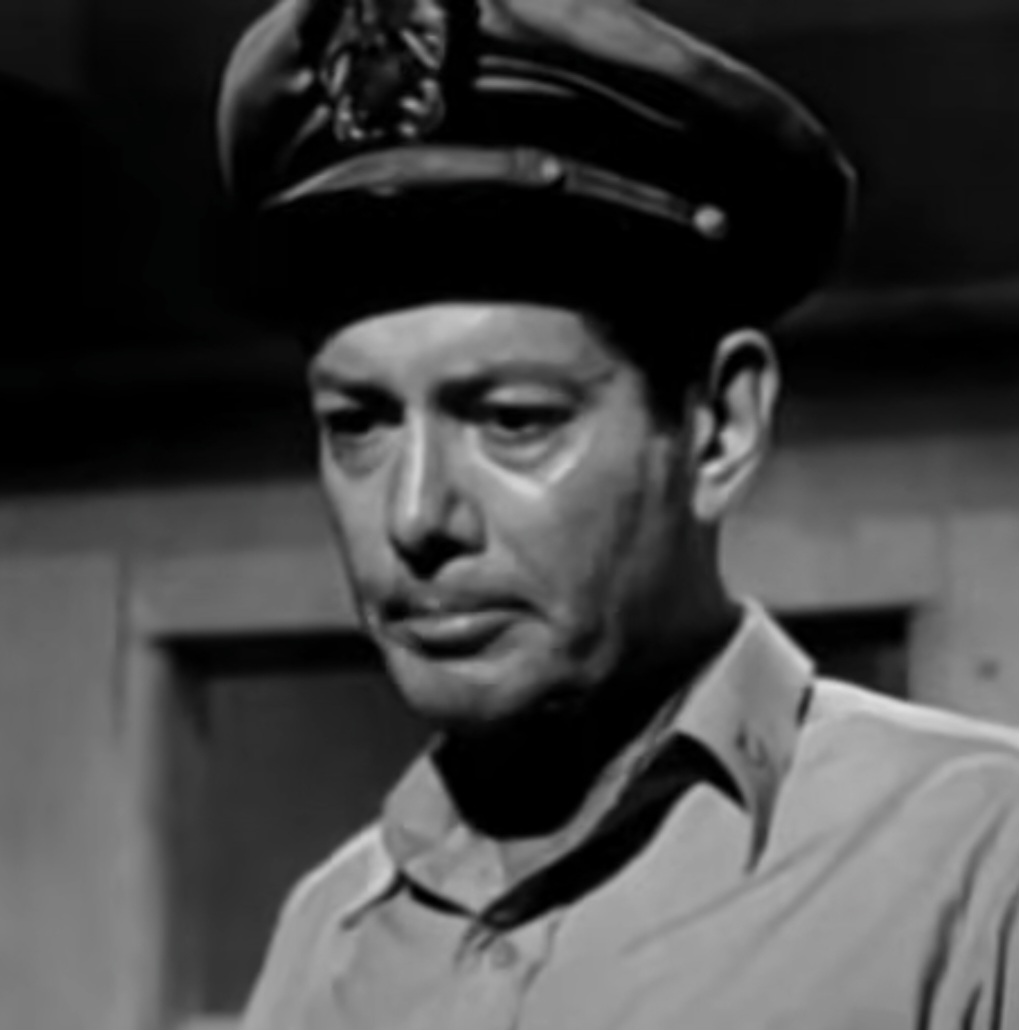
- Andrews in an episode of One Step Beyond (1959)
- Born: Theodore Edwin Anderson; November 9, 1914; El Paso, Texas, U.S.
- Died: November 7, 1972 (aged 57); Los Angeles, California, U.S.
- Other names: Michael Ames; Tod Williams
- Education: Washington State College
- Occupation: Actor
- Spouses: Gloria Eleanor Folland (m. 1947, divorced) Alice Hooker (divorced) Karolyn Rainwater (m. 1967)
- Children: 2

Tod Andrews (born Theodore Edwin Anderson; November 9, 1914 – November 7, 1972) was an American stage, screen, and television actor.

== Early years ==
Tod Andrews was born as Theodore Edwin Anderson in El Paso, Texas, to Henry and Lydia (née Apodaca; later Mrs. Silverman) Anderson, who wed in Pima, Arizona, on November 18, 1913.

Tod and his sister, Gertrude Anderson Pierucci, were raised in southern California; both suffered untimely deaths, predeceasing their mother, Lydia. Andrews graduated from Los Angeles High School and Washington State College.

== Career ==
=== Stage ===
Andrews began his career as Michael Ames at the Pasadena Playhouse and moved to New York City to appear onstage. Andrews acted with the Margo Jones Company in New York City from 1944 to 1948, when he was spotted by Joshua Logan. When Henry Fonda left the title role in Mister Roberts, Logan gave Andrews the part in the road production.

On Broadway, Andrews played in Summer and Smoke (1948-1949) and A Girl Can Tell. Billed as Michael Ames, he was in Quiet, Please! (1940), My Sister Eileen (1940-1943), Storm Operation (1944), Mrs. Kimball Presents (1944), Public Relations (1944), and That Old Devil (1944).

=== Film ===
Andrews was contracted to Warner Bros. with his first film being Dive Bomber (1941). He often used the name Michael Ames. His last film for Warners was The Last Ride that was shot in 1942 but not released until 1944.

He returned to films in 1965, appearing as Captain Tuthill in Otto Preminger's World War II action blockbuster In Harm's Way (1965). In 1968, Andrews appeared on film in Ted Post's Hang 'Em High as a defense attorney. Two years later, he worked again with Post in Beneath the Planet of the Apes, as James Franciscus's dying commanding officer, Colonel 'Skipper' Maddox. His final screen appearance was as a doctor in 1973's The Baby, also directed by Post.

=== Television ===
Andrews began his television career in 1949. His television performances included a starring role from 1957 to 1958 in the syndicated series of the American Civil War, The Gray Ghost, based on the heroic Confederate Colonel John Singleton Mosby. In 1959, he starred in the 13-episode Counterthrust, a syndicated series "in which he played a secret agent in the Far East battling Communism". Andrews made a screen test for the Perry Mason 1950s TV series playing Perry Mason opposite Raymond Burr as Hamilton Burger. This and other screen tests for that show were released on the Perry Mason 50th Anniversary 3-DVD set from 2008.

Andrews was cast as Captain Lynn Parker in the 1960 episode, "Yankee Confederate," on the syndicated anthology series, Death Valley Days, hosted by Stanley Andrews. In the story line, Parker is assigned by General Ulysses Grant (Stan Jones) to infiltrate a Confederate spy ring masterminded by Belle Waverly (Elaine Devry). He was cast in two episodes of the CBS sitcom, The Andy Griffith Show and in the 1962 series finale, "The Hoax," of the ABC adventure series, Straightaway, starring Brian Kelly and John Ashley. In 1962, he portrayed the part of Holt in the episode "The Devil and the Deep Blue" on CBS's Rawhide. In 1964, he appeared in "The Bewitchin' Pool", the last original broadcast episode of The Twilight Zone. In 1973, Andrews played U.S. President Jeremy Haines in the made-for-TV political thriller, The President's Plane is Missing.

== Recognition ==
Andrews won a Theatre World Award in 1949 for his work in Summer and Smoke.

== Personal life ==
Andrews was married three times, to Gloria Eleanor Folland, Alice Kirby Hooker, and Karolyn Rainwater. The first two marriages ended in divorce, and he was married to Rainwater when he died.

=== Suicide attempt ===
In early August 1961 Tod Andrews was hospitalized following a suicide attempt. According to an AP article published August 6, 1961, Andrews was hospitalized at Lenox Hill Hospital after an overdose of sleeping pills. It was reported that he had phoned a friend to say he was going to kill himself and was subsequently found slumped in a chair in the apartment of a female friend. He was hospitalized on a Saturday in critical condition but taken off the critical list later the same day. On August 15, 1961, an article by Dorothy Kilgallen in Voice of Broadway noted that friends of Andrews were "still mystified about his headlined suicide attempt” as only hours earlier he had apparently been "having a cheerful time at Danny's Hideaway" talking about the "great year he had coming up on Broadway and in TV and announced his engagement to Valerie Veigal".

== Death ==
Andrews died of a heart attack on November 7, 1972, in Los Angeles, two days before his 58th birthday. He was buried in Holy Cross Cemetery in Culver City.

== Filmography ==
=== Film ===
- Dive Bomber (1941) as Telephone Man (film debut, uncredited)
- International Squadron (1941) as Michele Edmé
- They Died with Their Boots On (1941) as Cadet Brown (uncredited)
- The Body Disappears (1941) as Bill
- Dangerously They Live (1941) as Dr. Craig (uncredited)
- Captains of the Clouds (1942) as Student Pilot
- Bullet Scars (1942) as Joe Madison
- The Male Animal (1942) as Student (uncredited)
- I Was Framed (1942) as Ken Marshall (Scott)
- Murder in the Big House (1942) as Dapper Dan Malloy
- Spy Ship (1942) as Gordon Morrel
- Now, Voyager (1942) as Dr. Dan Regan (uncredited)
- Truck Busters (1943) as Dave Todd
- Action in the North Atlantic (1943) as Ahearn (uncredited)
- Heaven Can Wait (1943) as Jack Van Cleve
- Voodoo Man (1944) as Ralph Dawson
- Return of the Ape Man (1944) as Steve Rogers
- The Last Ride (1944) as Fritz Hummel
- Outrage (1950) as Rev. Bruce Ferguson
- Between Heaven and Hell (1956) as Lt. Ray Mosby
- From Hell It Came (1957) as Dr. William Arnold
- In Harm's Way (1965) as Captain Tuthill
- Hang 'Em High (1968) as Defense Attorney
- Beneath the Planet of the Apes (1970) as Skipper
- The Baby (1973) as Doctor
- The President's Plane Is Missing (1973, TV) (final film)

=== Television ===
- The Gray Ghost (1957-1958) as Maj. John Mosby/The Gray Ghost
- One Step Beyond (1959) as Lt. Cmdr. Stacey
- Checkmate (1960-1962) as George Harris/Dr. James Low
- Death Valley Days (1960-1968) as Captain Lynn Parker/William C. Ralston
- 77 Sunset Strip (1961) as Jim Breck
- Gunsmoke (1961) as Myles Cody
- Frontier Circus (1961) as Jeff Andrews
- The Andy Griffith Show (1961-1968) as Ralph Case/Mr. Franklin
- Rawhide (1962) as Holt
- The Twilight Zone (1964) as Gil Sharewood
- The F.B.I. (1969) as Ed Franklin
- Bright Promise (1969) as Dean Henry Pierce #1
- The Bold Ones: The Lawyers (1970) as Ted Hollister
- Ironside (1970) as Man
- Ghost Story (1972) as Andrew Burgess
- Banacek (1972) as Graves (last appearance)
