= Leave It to the Irish =

1944 film by William Beaudine

- Directed by: William Beaudine
- Written by: Eddie Davis; Tim Ryan
- Produced by: Lindsley Parsons
- Starring: James Dunn; Wanda McKay; Jack La Rue
- Cinematography: Ira H. Morgan
- Edited by: Richard C. Currier
- Production company: Monogram Pictures
- Distributed by: Monogram Pictures
- Release date: August 26, 1944
- Running time: 71 minutes
- Country: United States
- Language: English

Leave It to the Irish is a 1944 American comedy crime film directed by William Beaudine and starring James Dunn, Wanda McKay and Jack La Rue.

== Cast ==
- James Dunn as Terry Moran, Private Investigator
- Wanda McKay as Nora O'Brien
- Jack La Rue as Rockwell, Black Swan Club Owner
- Dick Purcell as Pat Burke
- Arthur Loft as J. P. O'Brien, Chief of Detectives
- Barbara Woodell as Mrs. James Hamilton
- Vince Barnett as Barney Baker
- Joseph DeVillard as Henchman Gus
- Olaf Hytten as The Hamilton Butler
- Eddie Allen as Slim
- Dick Scott as Biff
- Ted Stanhope as Joe

== Bibliography ==
- Marshall, Wendy L. William Beaudine: From Silents to Television. Scarecrow Press, 2005.
