= Smart Guy (film) =

1943 film

- Theatrical release poster
- Directed by: Lambert Hillyer
- Screenplay by: John W. Krafft; Charles R. Marion
- Story by: Harrison Jacobs
- Produced by: John T. Coyle
- Starring: Rick Vallin; Veda Ann Borg; Bobby Larson; Wanda McKay; Jack La Rue; Mary Gordon
- Cinematography: Mack Stengler
- Edited by: Carl Pierson
- Production company: Monogram Pictures
- Distributed by: Monogram Pictures
- Release date: December 17, 1943
- Running time: 63 minutes
- Country: United States
- Language: English

Smart Guy is a 1943 American crime film directed by Lambert Hillyer and written by John W. Krafft and Charles R. Marion. The film stars Rick Vallin, Veda Ann Borg, Bobby Larson, Wanda McKay, Jack La Rue and Mary Gordon. The film was released on December 17, 1943, by Monogram Pictures.

== Cast ==
- Rick Vallin as Johnny Reagan
- Veda Ann Borg as Lee
- Bobby Larson as Bobby
- Wanda McKay as Jean Wickers
- Jack La Rue as Matt Taylor
- Mary Gordon as Maggie
- Paul McVey as Kilbourne
- Addison Richards as Ben Carter
- Roy Darmour as Kearns
- John Dawson as Evans
- Dan White as Sheriff
