= Raiders of Ghost City =

1944 film by Ray Taylor, Lewis D. Collins

- Directed by: Lewis D. Collins; Ray Taylor
- Written by: Luci Ward; Morgan Cox
- Produced by: Morgan Cox; Ray Taylor
- Starring: Dennis Moore; Wanda McKay; Lionel Atwill; Joe Sawyer; Regis Toomey
- Cinematography: Harry Neumann
- Edited by: Norman A. Cerf (supervising); Irving Birnbaum; Jack Dolan; Ace Herman; Alvin Todd; Edgar Zane
- Distributed by: Universal Pictures
- Release date: 1944
- Running time: 13 chapters (225 minutes)
- Country: United States
- Language: English

Raiders of Ghost City is a 1944 American Western film serial from Universal Pictures set in California during the American Civil War.

== Plot ==
At the height of the Civil War, a gang of supposed Confederates, headed by Alex Morel, raid all gold shipments from Oro Grande, California, bound for Washington. Captain Steve Clark is recognized as a Union Secret Service agent by Morel's accomplice Trina Dessard, along with his friend Idaho Jones, is ambushed in the baggage car and sent to almost certain death when the car is un-coupled and plunges down the mountainside.

Leaping to safety, Idaho and Steve report to Colonel Sewell in Oro Grande, and Idaho introduces himself as a Wells Fargo detective to Cathy Haines the Oro Grande company agent. Steve and Idaho learn that the Morel raiders are only posing as Confederates, and their headquarters are at Morel's "Golden Eagle" saloon. He also discovers that members of the gang use old European coins with the date "1752" as identification.

In a raid on the hideout, Steve's brother Jim is killed by the gang. The next victim is Confederate Army Captain Clay Randolph who has discovered that Morel is connected with a group of Prussian spies who have been using the stolen gold to initially finance Prussia's wars but later to buy Alaska from the Russian Empire as a "club over Canada"; hed gives Steve a clue before he dies. The date 1752 of the recognition coins is explained as the date of Frederick the Great's Testament that supposedly gave instructions how Prussia would take over the world.

The clue leads Steve to a San Francisco dive owned by Abel Rackerby, who thinking he has Steve in his power, exposes the ring's activities and operation methods. Aided by the San Francisco Secret Service, Steve escapes and returns to Oro Grande where he and Idaho round up the spies.

== Cast ==
- Dennis Moore as Captain Steve Clark
- Wanda McKay as Cathy Haines
- Lionel Atwill as Erich von Rugen, alias Alex Morel
- Joe Sawyer as Idaho Jones
- Regis Toomey as Captain Clay Randolph
- Virginia Christine as Countess Elsa von Merck, alias Trina Dressard
- Eddy Waller as Doc Blair
- Emmett Vogan as Count Manfried von Rinkton, alias Carl Lawton
- Addison Richards as Colonel Sewell
- Charles Wagenheim as Hugo Metzger, alias Abel Rackerby
- Jack Ingram as Braddock, Confederate outlaw

== Production ==
=== Stunts ===
- Frank McCarroll
- Ken Terrell
- Dale Van Sickel (including being the fight double for Dennis Moore)
- Henry Wills

== Critical reception ==
Cline writes that Raiders of Ghost City had a "good cast and production values...It came off quite well."

== Chapter titles ==
1. Murder by Accident
2. Flaming Treachery
3. Death Rides Double
4. Ghost City Terror
5. The Fatal Lariat
6. Water Rising
7. Bullet Avalanche
8. Death Laughs Last
9. Cold Steel
10. Showdown
11. The Trail to Torture
12. Calling all Buckboards
13. Golden Vengeance

_{Source:}

== See also ==
- List of films and television shows about the American Civil War
- List of film serials
- List of film serials by studio

== Notes ==
Preceded by The Great Alaskan Mystery (1944)	Universal Serial; Raiders of Ghost City (1944)	Succeeded by Mystery of the River Boat (1944)
