= Return of the Ape Man =

1944 film by Phil Rosen

- Directed by: Philip Rosen
- Screenplay by: Robert Charles (uncredited)
- Produced by: Sam Katzman; Jack Dietz
- Starring: Bela Lugosi
- Cinematography: Marcel LePicard
- Edited by: Carl Pierson
- Music by: Edward Kay (musical director)
- Production company: Banner Productions
- Distributed by: Monogram Pictures Corporation
- Release date: June 24, 1944
- Running time: 61 minutes
- Country: United States
- Language: English

Return of the Ape Man is a 1944 American film distributed by Monogram Pictures. It was directed by Philip Rosen and features actors Bela Lugosi, John Carradine, George Zucco, Frank Moran, Judith Gibson and Michael Ames.

== Plot ==
Two professors find a prehistoric caveman frozen in ice during an Arctic expedition. Professor Dexter (Bela Lugosi) and Professor John Gilmore (John Carradine) bring the frozen exhibit back home and soon devise a plan. They want to implant a more evolved brain into the caveman, with hopes of being able to control and utilize him.

== Cast ==
- Bela Lugosi as Professor Dexter
- John Carradine as Professor John Gilmore
- George Zucco and Frank Moran as Ape Man
- Judith Gibson as Anne
- Michael Ames as Steve
- Mary Currier as Mrs. Gilmore
- Ed Chandler as Sergeant
- Ernie Adams as Tramp

Uncredited

- George Eldredge as Patrolman on beat
- Horace B. Carpenter as Theater watchman

== Production ==
The working title for the film was 'Revenge of the Ape Man'. Production took place early in October 1943 and the film was released on June 24, 1944.

== Cast notes ==
=== Credits for the role of the Ape Man ===
George Zucco is co-credited on screen and in the publicity, along with Moran, as having played the Ape Man. At the onset of the laboratory scene where Prof. Dexter (Lugosi) and Gilmore (Carradine) are preparing to melt the caveman free from the block of ice, Zucco is shown in the Ape Man makeup - albeit briefly. Zucco's prominent nose, as well as his injured and withered left arm/hand (from a WWI injury) are clearly visible facing the camera. The shot (lasting only a few seconds in total) then switches away from the Ape Man. When it returns again to the same shot, Moran has replaced Zucco. The producers later explained Zucco became ill during the filming and kept his footage as a cost-saving measure while using Moran as a replacement actor for the remainder of the film.

=== Other ===
Frank Leigh is also credited by certain modern sources for the character of Long Shot.
