= Jack La Rue =

American actor (1902–1984)

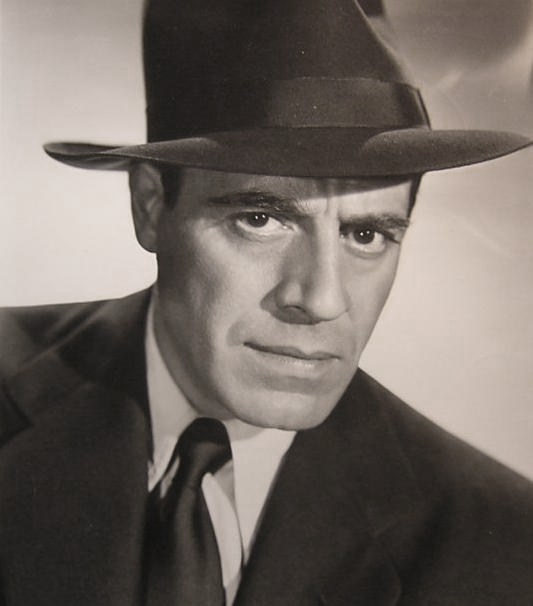
- Jack La Rue in For Heaven's Sake (1950)
- Born: Gaspare Biondolillo; May 3, 1902; Lercara Friddi, Italy
- Died: January 11, 1984 (aged 81); Santa Monica, California, U.S.
- Occupation: Actor
- Years active: 1923–1977
- Spouses: Constance Deighton Simpson (m. 1938; div. 1946) Violet Edith von Rosenberg (m. 1949; annul. 1955) Anne Giordano (m. 1962; annul. 1967)

Jack La Rue (born Gaspare Biondolillo; May 3, 1902 – January 11, 1984) was an American film and stage actor.

== Early life and family ==
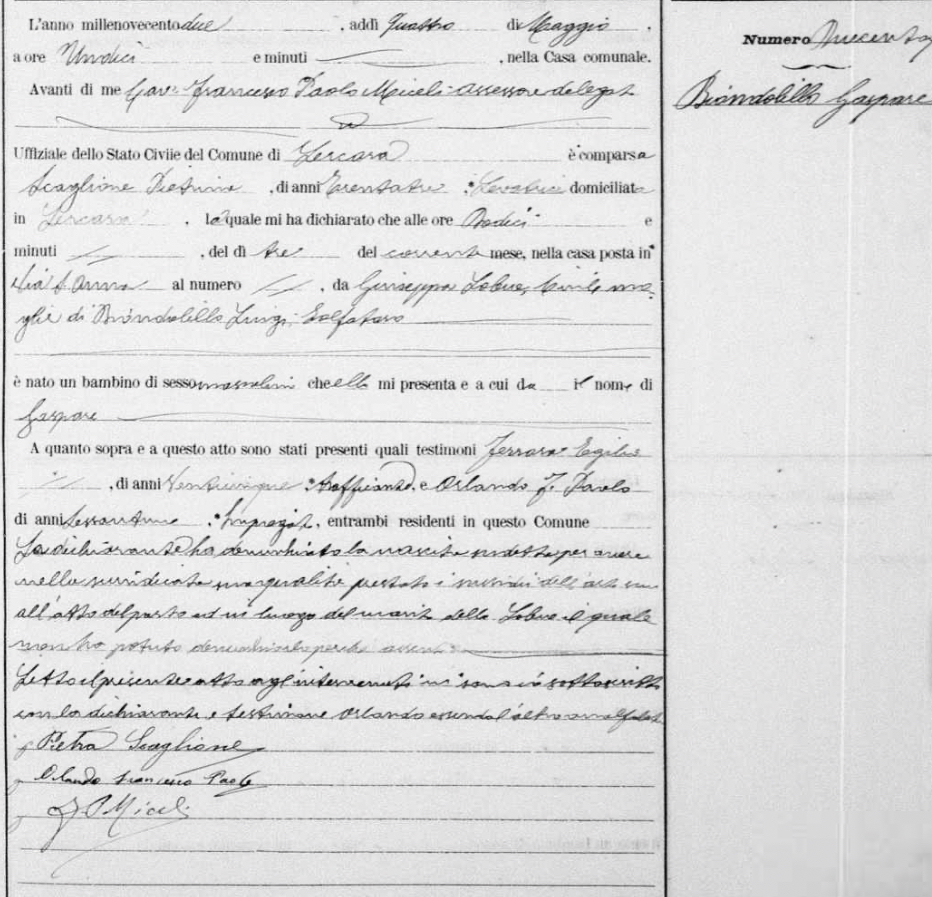
Jack La Rue birth certificate

Gaspare Biondolillo was the son of Sicilian immigrants Luigi Biondolillo (1874–1951) and Giuseppa lo Bue (1879–1970). Gaspare or "Jasper" was the oldest of six children. He was born in Lercara Friddi, Sicily.

A miner from the town of Lercara Friddi, Luigi married Giuseppa on May 20, 1899. Not long thereafter, Luigi emigrated from Sicily to the port of New York, accompanied by his sister Francesca. Arriving on August 26, 1900, the two siblings joined their brother Pasquale in the "Little Italy" section of Manhattan. Giuseppa emigrated later, arriving in New York on November 26, 1902. She brought along her five-month-old son Gaspare. They joined Luigi in Manhattan.

In the 1930 U.S. Census, Jasper is listed as still living with his parents. However, not long after, he moved to Hollywood to begin his film career.

Luigi had a brother called Gioacchino "Jack" Biondolillo. Gaspare adopted this as his given name for the stage. His surname "La Rue" was derived from his mother's maiden name of LoBue, sometimes written as "Lo Bue".

Jack's sister Emily (born May 16, 1917) relocated to Hollywood while still a teenager to follow in her big brother's footsteps, using the screen name "Emily LaRue". Her screen debut came in College Rhythm (1934) and she went on to appear in films like Gold Diggers of 1935 (1935), It Couldn't Have Happened – But It Did (1936), Zaza (1939), and A New Kind of Love (1963).

Jack's nephew Ronald Cognata also followed in his footsteps, taking the stage name "Jack La Rue, Jr." He married actress Kim Darby on October 8, 1978 (they divorced on June 30, 1981). Jack La Rue, Jr. is known for his roles in Crypt of the Living Dead (1973) and The Young Nurses (1973).

== Stage ==
La Rue went from high school to his first acting job in Otis Skinner's road company production of Blood and Sand. He performed in Broadway plays from around 1923 to 1931. According to La Rue, while appearing in Mae West's play Diamond Lil, he was spotted by Howard Hawks, who offered him a part in the film Scarface (1932), starring Paul Muni.

== Film ==
Jack moved to Hollywood sometime after 1930, where he appeared in numerous films. However, Scarface was not one of them. La Rue stated in a newspaper article that, after four days, Hawks replaced him with George Raft because La Rue was taller than Muni and had a more powerful voice. Later, however, Raft turned down the role of the despicable villain in The Story of Temple Drake (1933), fearing it would damage his screen image, so the part went to La Rue. Sometimes mistaken for Humphrey Bogart, he played thugs and gangsters for the most part. However, director Frank Borzage atypically cast him as a priest in the 1932 version of A Farewell to Arms simply because, according to newspaper columnist Hubbard Keavy, he was "tired of seeing conventional characters". La Rue stated he turned down a role in The Godfather (1972) and many parts in the television series The Untouchables because of the way they portrayed Italian-Americans.

== Personal life ==
He was married three times. La Rue married Los Angeles socialite Constance Deighton Simpson on September 22, 1938, in London. She obtained a divorce on December 17, 1946, charging him with mental cruelty. In 1955, he obtained an annulment from former Baroness Violet Edith von Rosenberg after six years of marriage, claiming she had only married him to obtain American citizenship and that they separated after less than two months. He married Anne Giordano on August 12, 1962; she obtained an annulment in 1967.

La Rue died of a heart attack at Saint John's Health Center in Santa Monica, California.

== Complete filmography ==
- The Lucky Devil (1925) as Prizefight Attendant (uncredited)
- The King on Main Street (1925) as Member of King's Retinue in Paris Hotel Lobby (uncredited)
- Fine Manners (1926) as New Year's Eve Celebrant (uncredited)
- East Side, West Side (1927) as Dining Extra (uncredited)
- The House of Terror (1928) a 10-chapter serial, today considered lost
- Follow the Leader (1930) as A Gangster
- Night World (1932) as Henchman (uncredited)
- The Mouthpiece (1932) as Joe Garland (uncredited)
- While Paris Sleeps (1932) as Julot
- Radio Patrol (1932) as Slick (uncredited)
- Blessed Event (1932) as Louis De Marco (uncredited)
- The All American (1932) as Joe Fiore
- Virtue (1932) as Toots
- Three on a Match (1932) as Ace's Henchman (uncredited)
- I Am a Fugitive from a Chain Gang (1932) as Ackerman (uncredited)
- Man Against Woman (1932) as Alberti
- A Farewell to Arms (1932) as The Priest
- Lawyer Man (1932) as Spike Murphy (uncredited)
- The Woman Accused (1933) as Little Maxie
- 42nd Street (1933) as Mug with Murphy (uncredited)
- Christopher Strong (1933) as Carlo
- Terror Aboard (1933) as Gregory Cordoff
- The Story of Temple Drake (1933) as Trigger
- The Girl in 419 (1933) as Sammy
- Gambling Ship (1933) as Pete Manning
- Headline Shooter (1933) as Ricci
- To the Last Man (1933) as Jim Daggs
- The Kennel Murder Case (1933) as Eduardo Grassi
- Miss Fane's Baby Is Stolen (1934) as Bert
- Good Dame (1934) as Bluch Brown
- The Fighting Rookie (1934) as Patrolman Jim Trent
- Straight Is the Way (1934) as Monk
- Take the Stand (1934) as George Gaylord
- No Ransom (1934) as Larry Romero
- Secret of the Chateau (1934) as Lucien Vonaire
- Calling All Cars (1935) as Jerry Kennedy
- Times Square Lady (1935) as Jack Kramer
- Men of the Hour (1935) as Nick Thomas
- The Headline Woman (1935) as Phil Zarias
- Under the Pampas Moon (1935) as Bazan
- The Daring Young Man (1935) as Cubby
- After the Dance (1935) as Mitch
- Little Big Shot (1935) as Doré
- Special Agent (1935) as Jake Andrews
- His Night Out (1935) as Joe Ferranza
- Waterfront Lady (1935) as Tom Braden
- The Spanish Cape Mystery (1935) as Gardner
- Hot Off the Press (1935) as Bill Jeffrey
- Remember Last Night? (1935) as Baptiste
- Strike Me Pink (1936) as Mr. Thrust
- The Bridge of Sighs (1936) as Packy Lacy
- In Paris, A.W.O.L. (1936) as Soldier
- Dancing Pirate (1936) as Lt. Chago (Baltazar's Aide)
- It Couldn't Have Happened – But It Did (1936) as Smiley Clark
- Born to Fight (1936) as Smoothy Morgan
- A Tenderfoot Goes West (1936) as James Killer Madden
- Ellis Island (1936) as Dude
- Yellow Cargo (1936) as Al Perrelli
- Go West, Young Man (1936) as Rico in 'Drifting Lady'
- Mind Your Own Business (1936) as Cruger
- Her Husband Lies (1937) as 'Trigger, ' Gunman
- That I May Live (1937) as Charlie
- Captains Courageous (1937) as Priest
- Dangerous Holiday (1937) as Gollenger
- Trapped by G-Men (1937) as Fred Drake
- Arson Gang Busters (1938) as Bud Morgan
- Under the Big Top (1938) as Ricardo Le Grande
- Valley of the Giants (1938) as Ed Morrell
- I Demand Payment (1938) as Smiles Badolio
- Murder in Soho (1939) as Steve Marco
- The Gang's All Here (1939) as Alberni
- Big Town Czar (1939) as Mike Luger
- In Old Caliente (1939) as Sujarno
- Charlie Chan in Panama (1940) as Manolo
- Forgotten Girls (1940) as Eddie Nolan
- Enemy Agent (1940) as Alex
- The Sea Hawk (1940) as Lt. Ortega
- Fugitive from a Prison Camp (1940) as Red Nelson
- East of the River (1940) as Frank 'Frisco' Scarfi
- Footsteps in the Dark (1941) as Ace Vernon
- Paper Bullets (1941) as Mickey Roman
- Ringside Maisie (1941) as Ricky Du Prez
- Gentleman from Dixie (1941) as Thad Terrill
- Hard Guy (1941) as Vic Monroe
- Swamp Woman (1941) as Pete Oliver / Pierre Pertinax Pontineau Briand Broussicourt d'Olivier
- A Desperate Chance for Ellery Queen (1942) as Tommy Gould
- Pardon My Sarong (1942) as Tabor (uncredited)
- Highways by Night (1942) as Johnny Lieber, Gangster
- X Marks the Spot (1942) as Marty Clark
- The Payoff (1942) as John Angus
- American Empire (1942) as Pierre- Beauchard Henchman
- You Can't Beat the Law (1943) as Cain
- A Gentle Gangster (1943) as Hugo
- Secret Service in Darkest Africa (1943 serial) as Hassan (Ch. 6) (uncredited)
- The Law Rides Again (1943) as Duke Dillon
- The Girl from Monterrey (1943) as Al Johnson
- A Scream in the Dark (1943) as Det. Lt. Cross
- Never a Dull Moment (1943) as Joey
- Pistol Packin' Mama (1943) as Johnny Rossi
- The Sultan's Daughter (1943) as Rata
- The Desert Song (1943) as Lieutenant Bertin
- Smart Guy (1943) as Matt Taylor
- Follow the Leader (1944) as Larry
- Machine Gun Mama (1944) as Jose
- Leave It to the Irish (1944) as Rockwell
- The Last Ride (1944) as Joe Genna
- Dangerous Passage (1944) as Mike Zomano
- Steppin' in Society (1945) as Bow Tie
- The Spanish Main (1945) as Lt. Escobar
- Dakota (1945) as Suade
- Cornered (1945) as Diego, Hotel Valet
- Road to Utopia (1945) as LeBec
- Murder in the Music Hall (1946) as Bruce Wilton
- In Old Sacramento (1946) as Laramie
- Santa Fe Uprising (1946) as Bruce Jackson
- My Favorite Brunette (1947) as Tony
- Bush Pilot (1947) as Paul Girard
- Robin Hood of Monterey (1947) as Don Ricardo Gonzales
- No Orchids for Miss Blandish (1948) as Slim Grisson
- For Heaven's Sake (1950) as Tony Clark
- Ride the Man Down (1952) as Kennedy
- Slaughter on Tenth Avenue (1957) as Father Paul (uncredited)
- 40 Pounds of Trouble (1962) as Nick the Greek (uncredited)
- Robin and the 7 Hoods (1964) as Tomatoes
- For Those Who Think Young (1964) as Cronin's Business Associate
- The Spy in the Green Hat (1967) as Federico "Feet" Stilletto
- Paesano: A Voice in the Night (1975) as Bartender
- Won Ton Ton, the Dog Who Saved Hollywood (1976) as Silent Film Villain
