= Here Comes Kelly =

1943 film by William Beaudine

- Directed by: William Beaudine
- Written by: Charles R. Marion
- Story by: Jeb Schary
- Produced by: William T. Lackey
- Starring: Eddie Quillan; Joan Woodbury
- Cinematography: Arthur Martinelli
- Edited by: Carl Pierson
- Music by: Edward J. Kay; Manuel Esperón
- Production company: Monogram Productions
- Release date: September 10, 1943 (U.S.)
- Running time: 65 minutes
- Country: United States
- Language: English

Here Comes Kelly is a 1943 American comedy crime film directed by William Beaudine and starring Eddie Quillan, Joan Woodbury and Armida. It was produced and distributed by Monogram Pictures. It was followed by a sequel There Goes Kelly in 1945.

== Cast ==
- Eddie Quillan as Jimmy Kelly
- Joan Woodbury as Margie Burke
- Maxie Rosenbloom as Trixie Bell
- Armida as Babette
- Sidney Miller as Sammy Cohn
- Mary Gordon as Mrs. Kelly
- Ian Keith as L. Herbert Oakley
- Luis Alberni as Nick
- Charles Jordan as Stevens
- Emmett Vogan as District Attorney
- John Dilson
- Dick Elliott as Driscoll
- Sugar Geise as Blondie
