= Mystery of the River Boat =

1944 film by Ray Taylor, Lewis D. Collins

- Directed by: Lewis D. Collins; Ray Taylor
- Written by: Ande Lamb; Maurice Tombragel
- Produced by: Henry MacRae
- Starring: Robert Lowery; Eddie Quillan; Marion Martin; Marjorie Clements; Lyle Talbot; Arthur Hohl
- Cinematography: William A. Sickner
- Edited by: Irving Birnbaum; Jack Dolan; Ace Herman; Alvin Todd; Edgar Zane
- Music by: Paul Sawtell
- Distributed by: Universal Pictures
- Release date: October 24, 1944
- Running time: 13 chapters (218 minutes)
- Country: United States
- Language: English

Mystery of the River Boat, Chapter 1, The Tragic Crash

Mystery of the River Boat is a 1944 Universal movie serial directed by Lewis D. Collins and Ray Taylor. It co-starred Lyle Talbot, Robert Lowery and Mantan Moreland.

== Plot ==
Deposits of "Nitrolene", a high-energy fuel, have been discovered in swampland near Duval's Landing in the bayous of Louisiana by Dr. Hartman, who signs an agreement with developer Herman Einreich. After getting the map locating the deposits, Einreich has Hartman killed by his henchman Cassard and departs for Duval's Landing on the riverboat Morning Glory. The riverboat's captain, Ethan Perrin, is one of the three landowners involved, and attorney Steve Langtry, the son of one of the other two landowners, is investigating Einreich's offer for his father's land, but foreign agent Rudolph Toller and his underlings Bruno Bloch and Louis Schaber are also on the Morning Glory trying to get Einreich's map, aided by one of the riverboat's entertainers, singer Celeste Eltree. "Mystery Man" Clayton and his Cajun associate Batiste are also clearly up to no good, but helping Langtry are Captain Perrin's daughter Jenny, the riverboat's steward Napoleon and entertainer Jug Jenks.

== Cast ==
- Robert Lowery as Steve Langtry
- Eddie Quillan as Jug Jenks
- Marion Martin as Celeste Eltree, riverboat singer
- Marjorie Clements as Jenny Perrin, Captain Perrin's daughter
- Lyle Talbot as Rudolph Toller, foreign agent
- Arthur Hohl as Clayton
- Oscar O'Shea as Captain Ethan Perrin, captain of the riverboat The Morning Glory
- Francis McDonald as Batiste
- Mantan Moreland as Napoleon, ship steward
- Eddy Waller as Charles Langtry
- Ian Wolfe as Herman Einreich, villainous land speculator
- Byron Foulger as Dr. H. Hartman
- Earle Hodgins as Jean Duval
- Anthony Warde as Bruno Bloch
- Alec Craig as the Chief Engineer

== Production ==
=== Stunts ===
- John Daheim doubling Robert Lowery
- Carey Loftin doubling Robert Lowery
- Eddie Parker doubling Dick Curtis
- Tom Steele doubling Arthur Hohl

== Critical reception ==
Cline considers this to be an average serial but one with a good cast and all the necessary "ingredients" of a good serial.

== Chapter titles ==
1. The Tragic Crash
2. The Phantom Killer
3. The Flaming Inferno
4. The Brink of Doom
5. The Highway of Peril
6. The Fatal Plunge
7. The Toll of the Storm
8. The Break in the Levee
9. Trapped in the Quicksands
10. Flaming Havoc
11. Electrocuted
12. Risking Death
13. The Boomerang

_{Source:}

== See also ==
- List of film serials by year
- List of film serials by studio

Preceded by Raiders of Ghost City (1944)	Universal Serial; Mystery of the River Boat (1944)	Succeeded by Jungle Queen (1945)
