= That I May Live =

1937 film by Allan Dwan

- Theatrical release poster
- Directed by: Allan Dwan
- Screenplay by: Ben Markson; William M. Conselman
- Produced by: Sol M. Wurtzel
- Starring: Rochelle Hudson; Robert Kent; J. Edward Bromberg; Jack La Rue; Frank Conroy; Fred Kelsey
- Cinematography: Robert H. Planck
- Edited by: Louis R. Loeffler
- Production company: 20th Century Fox
- Distributed by: 20th Century Fox
- Release date: April 30, 1937
- Running time: 70 minutes
- Country: United States
- Language: English

That I May Live is a 1937 American crime film directed by Allan Dwan, written by Ben Markson and William M. Conselman, and starring Rochelle Hudson, Robert Kent, J. Edward Bromberg, Jack La Rue, Frank Conroy and Fred Kelsey. It was released on April 30, 1937, by 20th Century Fox.

== Cast ==
- Rochelle Hudson as Irene Howard
- Robert Kent as Dick Mannion
- J. Edward Bromberg as Tex Shapiro
- Jack La Rue as Charlie
- Frank Conroy as Pop
- Fred Kelsey as Abner Jenkins
- George Cooper as Mack
- DeWitt Jennings as Chief of Police
- Russell Simpson as Bish Plivens
- William "Billy" Benedict as Kurt Plivens
