= List of American films of 1945 =

American films released in 1945

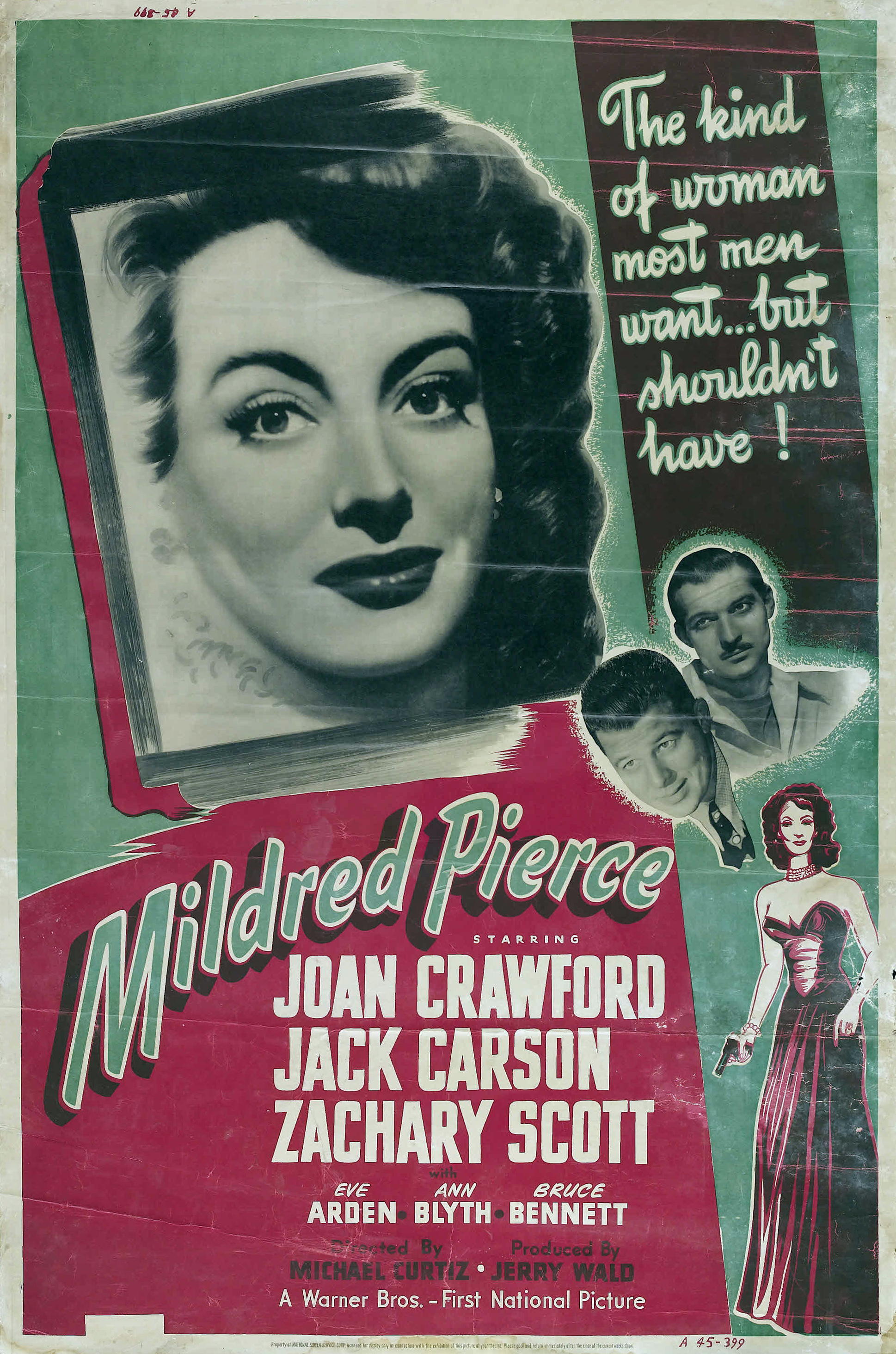
Mildred Pierce.

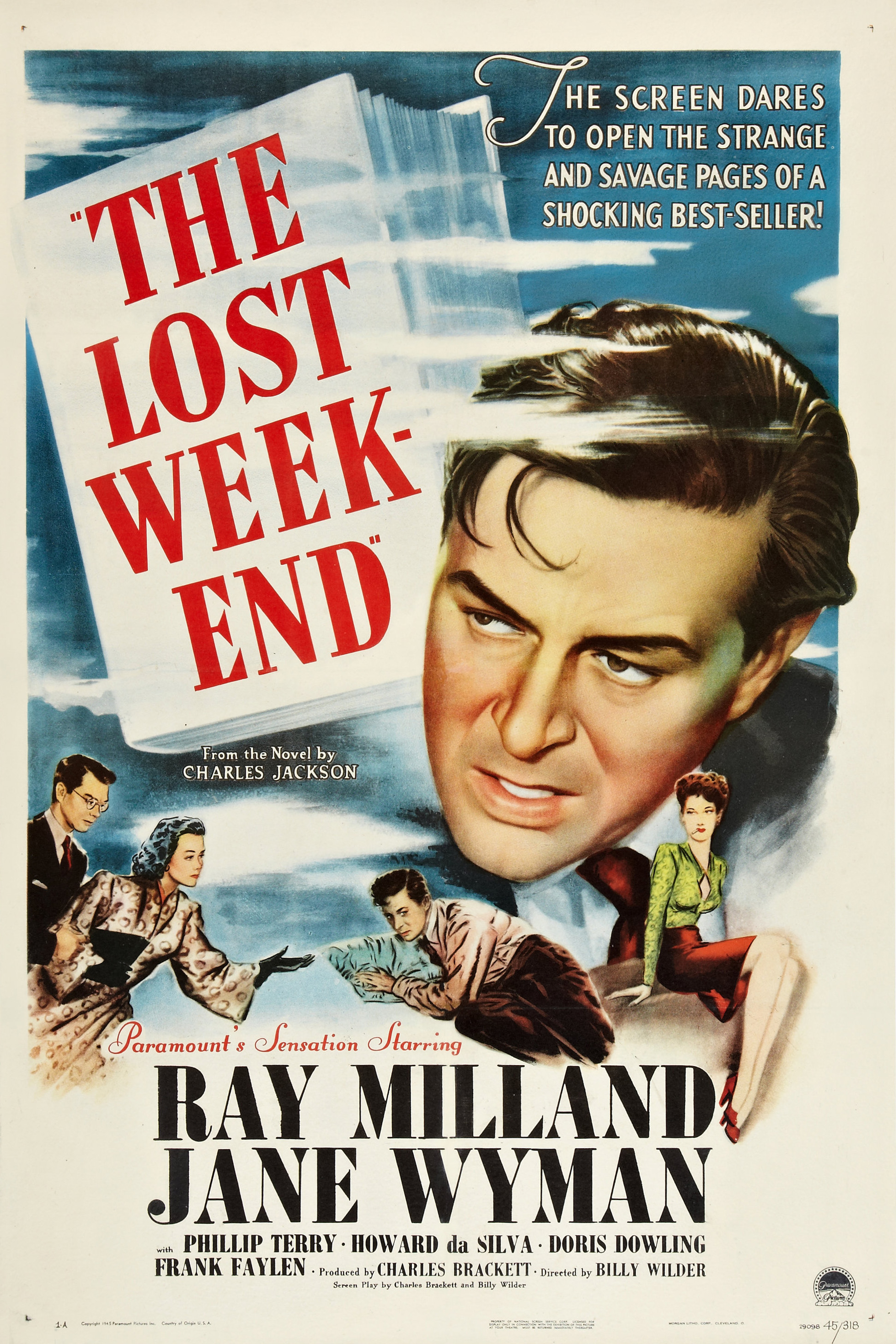
The Lost Weekend.

More than 350 American feature films were released in 1945. In that year, the film The Lost Weekend won Best Picture at the Academy Awards.

== A ==
Title	Director	Cast	Genre	Notes
Abbott and Costello in Hollywood	S. Sylvan Simon	Abbott and Costello, Lucille Ball, Rags Ragland	Comedy	MGM
Adventure	Victor Fleming	Clark Gable, Greer Garson, Joan Blondell	Adventure	MGM
Adventures of Kitty O'Day	William Beaudine	Jean Parker, Peter Cookson, Lorna Gray	Mystery	Monogram; sequel to 1944 film
Adventures of Rusty	Paul Burnford	Ted Donaldson, Margaret Lindsay, Conrad Nagel	Drama	Columbia
The Affairs of Susan	William A. Seiter	Joan Fontaine, George Brent, Dennis O'Keefe	Comedy	Paramount
Allotment Wives	William Nigh	Kay Francis, Otto Kruger, Gertrude Michael	Drama	Monogram
Along Came Jones	Stuart Heisler	Gary Cooper, Loretta Young, William Demarest	Western	RKO
Along the Navajo Trail	Frank McDonald	Roy Rogers, Dale Evans, Estelita Rodriguez	Western	Republic
An Angel Comes to Brooklyn	Leslie Goodwins	Barbara Perry, Charles Kemper, Marguerite d'Alvarez	Comedy	Republic
Anchors Aweigh	George Sidney	Frank Sinatra, Kathryn Grayson, Gene Kelly	Musical	MGM
And Then There Were None	René Clair	Barry Fitzgerald, Walter Huston, Louis Hayward	Mystery	20th Century Fox. Written by Agatha Christie
Apology for Murder	Sam Newfield	Ann Savage, Hugh Beaumont, Russell Hicks	Crime drama	PRC
Arson Squad	Lew Landers	Frank Albertson, Robert Armstrong, Byron Foulger	Crime	PRC

== B ==
Title	Director	Cast	Genre	Notes
Back to Bataan	Edward Dmytryk	John Wayne, Anthony Quinn, Beulah Bondi	War	RKO
Bad Men of the Border	Wallace Fox	Kirby Grant, Armida, John Eldredge	Western	Universal
Bandits of the Badlands	Thomas Carr	Sunset Carson, Peggy Stewart, Forrest Taylor	Western	Republic
Bedside Manner	Andrew L. Stone	John Carroll, Ruth Hussey, Ann Rutherford	Comedy	United Artists
Behind City Lights	John English	Lynne Roberts, Peter Cookson, Jerome Cowan	Drama	Republic
A Bell for Adano	Henry King	Gene Tierney, John Hodiak, William Bendix	War Drama	20th Century Fox
Bells of Rosarita	Frank McDonald	Roy Rogers, Dale Evans, Adele Mara	Western	Republic
The Bells of St. Mary's	Leo McCarey	Bing Crosby, Ingrid Bergman, William Gargan	Drama	RKO. Sequel to Going My Way
Betrayal from the East	William A. Berke	Lee Tracy, Nancy Kelly, Regis Toomey	War	RKO
Between Two Women	Willis Goldbeck	Van Johnson, Gloria DeHaven, Marilyn Maxwell	Drama	MGM
Bewitched	Arch Oboler	Phyllis Thaxter, Edmund Gwenn, Addison Richards	Drama	MGM
Beyond the Pecos	Lambert Hillyer	Rod Cameron, Jennifer Holt, Fuzzy Knight	Western	Universal
The Big Show-Off	Howard Bretherton	Arthur Lake, Dale Evans, George Meeker	Comedy	Republic
Black Market Babies	William Beaudine	Ralph Morgan, Teala Loring, Kane Richmond	Drama	Monogram
Blazing the Western Trail	Vernon Keays	Charles Starrett, Dub Taylor, Carole Mathews	Western	Columbia
Blonde from Brooklyn	Del Lord	Bob Haymes, Lynn Merrick, Thurston Hall	Comedy	Columbia
Blonde Ransom	William Beaudine	Virginia Grey, Pinky Lee, Donald Cook	Drama	Universal
Blood on the Sun	Frank Lloyd	James Cagney, Sylvia Sidney, Porter Hall	Thriller	United Artists
The Body Snatcher	Robert Wise	Boris Karloff, Bela Lugosi, Henry Daniell	Horror	RKO
Border Badmen	Sam Newfield	Buster Crabbe, Lorraine Miller, Al St. John	Western	PRC
Boston Blackie Booked on Suspicion	Arthur Dreifuss	Chester Morris, Lynn Merrick, Richard Lane	Mystery	Columbia
Boston Blackie's Rendezvous	Arthur Dreifuss	Chester Morris, Nina Foch, Steve Cochran	Mystery	Columbia
Both Barrels Blazing	Derwin Abrahams	Charles Starrett, Dub Taylor, Charles King	Western	Columbia
Brewster's Millions	Allan Dwan	Dennis O'Keefe, Helen Walker, June Havoc	Comedy	United Artists
The Brighton Strangler	Max Nosseck	John Loder, June Duprez, Miles Mander	Crime drama	RKO
Bring on the Girls	Sidney Lanfield	Veronica Lake, Sonny Tufts, Marjorie Reynolds	Comedy	Paramount
The Bullfighters	Malcolm St. Clair	Laurel and Hardy, Richard Lane, Diosa Costello	Comedy	20th Century Fox

== C ==
Title	Director	Cast	Genre	Notes
Captain Eddie	Lloyd Bacon	Fred MacMurray, Lynn Bari, Charles Bickford	Drama	20th Century Fox
The Captain from Köpenick	Richard Oswald	Albert Bassermann, Mary Brian, Eric Blore	Comedy	Film Classics
Captain Kidd	Rowland V. Lee	Charles Laughton, Randolph Scott, Barbara Britton	Adventure	United Artists
Captain Tugboat Annie	Phil Rosen	Jane Darwell, Edgar Kennedy, Pamela Blake	Comedy	Republic
The Caribbean Mystery	Robert D. Webb	James Dunn, Sheila Ryan, Reed Hadley	Mystery	20th Century Fox
The Cheaters	Joseph Kane	Joseph Schildkraut, Billie Burke, Eugene Pallette	Comedy	Republic
The Cherokee Flash	Thomas Carr	Sunset Carson, Linda Stirling, Tom London	Western	Republic
The Chicago Kid	Frank McDonald	Don "Red" Barry, Otto Kruger, Lynne Roberts	Crime	Republic
China Sky	Ray Enright	Randolph Scott, Ruth Warrick, Ellen Drew	War drama	RKO
China's Little Devils	Monta Bell	Harry Carey, Paul Kelly, Jimmie Dodd	War	Monogram
Christmas in Connecticut	Peter Godfrey	Barbara Stanwyck, Dennis Morgan, Sydney Greenstreet	Comedy	Warner Bros.; Remade in 1992
Circumstantial Evidence	John Larkin	Lloyd Nolan, Michael O'Shea, Trudy Marshall	Crime	20th Century Fox
The Cisco Kid Returns	John P. McCarthy	Duncan Renaldo, Martin Garralaga, Cecilia Callejo	Western	Monogram. Cisco Kid series.
The Clock	Vincente Minnelli	Judy Garland, Robert Walker, James Gleason	Drama	MGM
Club Havana	Edgar G. Ulmer	Margaret Lindsay, Tom Neal, Lita Baron	Mystery	PRC
Code of the Lawless	Wallace Fox	Kirby Grant, Jane Adams, Fuzzy Knight	Western	Universal
Colorado Pioneers	R. G. Springsteen	Wild Bill Elliott, Alice Fleming, Roy Barcroft	Western	Republic
Come Out Fighting	William Beaudine	Leo Gorcey, Huntz Hall, Billy Benedict	Comedy	Monogram
Confidential Agent	Herman Shumlin	Charles Boyer, Lauren Bacall, Victor Francen	Spy thriller	Warner Bros.
Conflict	Curtis Bernhardt	Humphrey Bogart, Alexis Smith, Sydney Greenstreet	Suspense	Warner Bros.
The Corn Is Green	Irving Rapper	Bette Davis, Joan Lorring, John Dall	Drama	Warner Bros.; Remade in 1979
Cornered	Edward Dmytryk	Dick Powell, Walter Slezak, Micheline Cheirel	Film noir	RKO
Corpus Christi Bandits	Wallace Grissell	Allan Lane, Helen Talbot, Jack Kirk	Western	Republic
Counter-Attack	Zoltan Korda	Paul Muni, Marguerite Chapman, Larry Parks	War	Columbia
The Crime Doctor's Courage	George Sherman	Warner Baxter, Hillary Brooke, Jerome Cowan	Mystery	Columbia. One of series
Crime Doctor's Warning	William Castle	Warner Baxter, Dusty Anderson, John Litel	Mystery	Columbia
Crime, Inc.	Lew Landers	Leo Carrillo, Tom Neal, Martha Tilton, Lionel Atwill	Thriller	PRC
The Crimson Canary	John Hoffman	Noah Beery Jr., Lois Collier, Steven Geray	Mystery	Universal

== D–E ==
Title	Director	Cast	Genre	Notes
Dakota	Joseph Kane	John Wayne, Vera Ralston, Walter Brennan	Western	Republic;
The Daltons Ride Again	Ray Taylor	Lon Chaney Jr., Alan Curtis, Martha O'Driscoll	Western	Universal
Dangerous Intruder	Vernon Keays	Veda Ann Borg, Charles Arnt, Richard Powers	Crime	PRC
Dangerous Partners	Edward L. Cahn	Signe Hasso, James Craig, Edmund Gwenn	Crime	MGM
Danger Signal	Robert Florey	Faye Emerson, Zachary Scott, Rosemary DeCamp	Crime	Warner Bros.
Delightfully Dangerous	Arthur Lubin	Jane Powell, Ralph Bellamy, Constance Moore	Musical	United Artists
Detour	Edgar G. Ulmer	Tom Neal, Ann Savage, Claudia Drake	Film noir	PRC
Diamond Horseshoe	George Seaton	Betty Grable, Dick Haymes, Phil Silvers	Musical	20th Century Fox
Dick Tracy	William A. Berke	Morgan Conway, Anne Jeffreys, Mike Mazurki	Mystery	RKO. Based on comic strip
Dillinger	Max Nosseck	Lawrence Tierney, Anne Jeffreys, Edmund Lowe	Crime biopic	Monogram
Divorce	William Nigh	Kay Francis, Bruce Cabot, Helen Mack	Drama	Monogram
Docks of New York	Wallace Fox	Leo Gorcey, Huntz Hall, Betty Blythe	Comedy	Monogram
Doll Face	Lewis Seiler	Vivian Blaine, Carmen Miranda, Dennis O'Keefe	Comedy	20th Century Fox
The Dolly Sisters	Irving Cummings	Betty Grable, June Haver, John Payne	Musical	20th Century Fox
Don Juan Quilligan	Frank Tuttle	William Bendix, Joan Blondell, Phil Silvers	Comedy	20th Century Fox
Don't Fence Me In	John English	Roy Rogers, Dale Evans, George "Gabby" Hayes	Western	Republic
Duffy's Tavern	Hal Walker	Bing Crosby, Betty Hutton, Paulette Goddard	Comedy	Paramount
Eadie Was a Lady	Arthur Dreifuss	Ann Miller, Jeff Donnell, William Wright	Musical	Columbia
Earl Carroll Vanities	Joseph Santley	Dennis O'Keefe, Constance Moore, Eve Arden	Musical	Republic
Easy to Look At	Ford Beebe	Gloria Jean, Kirby Grant, Eric Blore	Comedy	Universal
The Enchanted Cottage	John Cromwell	Robert Young, Dorothy McGuire, Herbert Marshall	Romantic comedy	RKO
The Enchanted Forest	Lew Landers	Edmund Lowe, Brenda Joyce, Harry Davenport	Family	PRC
Enemy of the Law	Harry L. Fraser	Tex Ritter, Kay Hughes, Guy Wilkerson	Western	PRC
Escape in the Desert	Edward A. Blatt	Jean Sullivan, Philip Dorn, Irene Manning	Drama	Warner Bros.
Escape in the Fog	Budd Boetticher	Otto Kruger, Nina Foch, William Wright	Film noir	Columbia
Eve Knew Her Apples	Will Jason	Ann Miller, William Wright, Ray Walker	Musical comedy	Columbia

== F ==
Title	Director	Cast	Genre	Notes
The Falcon in San Francisco	Joseph H. Lewis	Tom Conway, Rita Corday, Edward Brophy	Mystery	RKO
Fallen Angel	Otto Preminger	Alice Faye, Dana Andrews, Linda Darnell	Film noir	20th Century Fox;
Fashion Model	William Beaudine	Robert Lowery, Marjorie Weaver, Tim Ryan	Film noir	Monogram
The Fatal Witness	Lesley Selander	Evelyn Ankers, Richard Fraser, Barbara Everest	Crime	Republic
Fighting Bill Carson	Sam Newfield	Buster Crabbe, Kay Hughes, Kermit Maynard	Western	PRC
First Yank into Tokyo	Gordon Douglas	Tom Neal, Barbara Hale, Keye Luke	War	RKO
Flame of Barbary Coast	Joseph Kane	John Wayne, Ann Dvorak, Joseph Schildkraut	Western	Republic
Flame of the West	Lambert Hillyer	Johnny Mack Brown, Raymond Hatton, Joan Woodbury	Western	Monogram
Flaming Bullets	Harry L. Fraser	Tex Ritter, Dave O'Brien, Guy Wilkerson	Western	PRC
Fog Island	Terry O. Morse	George Zucco, Lionel Atwill, Jerome Cowan	Mystery	PRC
Follow That Woman	Lew Landers	William Gargan, Nancy Kelly, Regis Toomey	Comedy	Paramount
Forever Yours	William Nigh	Gale Storm, C. Aubrey Smith, Conrad Nagel	Drama	Monogram
Frisco Sal	George Waggner	Susanna Foster, Turhan Bey, Alan Curtis	Western	Universal
Frontier Feud	Lambert Hillyer	Johnny Mack Brown, Raymond Hatton, Christine McIntyre	Western	Monogram
Frontier Fugitives	Harry L. Fraser	Tex Ritter, Lorraine Miller, Guy Wilkerson	Western	PRC
Frontier Gal	Charles Lamont	Yvonne de Carlo, Rod Cameron, Andy Devine	Western	Universal
The Frozen Ghost	Harold Young	Lon Chaney Jr., Elena Verdugo, Evelyn Ankers	Horror	Universal

== G ==
Title	Director	Cast	Genre	Notes
A Game of Death	Robert Wise	Audrey Long, John Loder, Russell Wade	Horror	RKO
Gangs of the Waterfront	George Blair	Stephanie Bachelor, Robert Armstrong, Martin Kosleck	Crime	Republic
Gangster's Den	Sam Newfield	Buster Crabbe, Al St. John, Charles King	Western	PRC
The Gay Senorita	Arthur Dreifuss	Jinx Falkenburg, Jim Bannon, Steve Cochran	Comedy	Columbia
G. I. Honeymoon	Phil Karlson	Gale Storm, Arline Judge, Peter Cookson	Comedy	Monogram
George White's Scandals	Felix E. Feist	Joan Davis, Jack Haley, Martha Holliday	Musical	RKO
Getting Gertie's Garter	Allan Dwan	Dennis O'Keefe, Marie McDonald, Barry Sullivan	Comedy	United Artists
The Girl of the Limberlost	Mel Ferrer	Ruth Nelson, Gloria Holden, Vanessa Brown	Drama	Columbia
Girls of the Big House	George Archainbaud	Lynne Roberts, Virginia Christine, Marion Martin	Crime drama	Republic
God Is My Co-Pilot	Robert Florey	Dennis Morgan, Dane Clark, Raymond Massey	War	Warner Bros.
The Great Flamarion	Anthony Mann	Eric von Stroheim, Mary Beth Hughes, Dan Duryea	Film noir	Republic
The Great John L.	Frank Tuttle	Linda Darnell, Barbara Britton, Greg McClure	Biopic	United Artists
Great Stagecoach Robbery	Lesley Selander	Wild Bill Elliott, Alice Fleming, Robert Blake	Western	Republic
Grissly's Millions	John English	Paul Kelly, Virginia Grey, Elisabeth Risdon	Mystery	Republic
Guest Wife	Sam Wood	Claudette Colbert, Don Ameche, Dick Foran	Comedy	United Artists
Gun Smoke	Howard Bretherton	Johnny Mack Brown, Jennifer Holt, Raymond Hatton	Western	Monogram
A Guy, a Gal and a Pal	Budd Boetticher	Ross Hunter, Lynn Merrick, George Meeker	Comedy	Columbia

== H ==
Title	Director	Cast	Genre	Notes
Hangover Square	John Brahm	Laird Cregar, Linda Darnell, George Sanders	Horror	20th Century Fox
Having Wonderful Crime	A. Edward Sutherland	Pat O'Brien, George Murphy, Carole Landis	Comedy	RKO
Here Come the Co-Eds	Jean Yarbrough	Abbott and Costello, Peggy Ryan, Martha O'Driscoll	Comedy	Universal
Her Highness and the Bellboy	Richard Thorpe	Hedy Lamarr, Robert Walker, June Allyson	Romantic comedy	MGM
Her Lucky Night	Edward Lilley	Martha O'Driscoll, Andrews Sisters, Noah Beery Jr.	Musical	Universal
The Hidden Eye	Richard Whorf	Edward Arnold, Frances Rafferty, Ray Collins	Mystery	MGM
High Powered	William Berke	Phyllis Brooks, Robert Lowery, Mary Treen	Drama	Paramount
His Brother's Ghost	Sam Newfield	Buster Crabbe, Al St. John, Charles King	Western	PRC
Hit the Hay	Del Lord	Judy Canova, Ross Hunter, Gloria Holden	Comedy	Columbia
Hitchhike to Happiness	Joseph Santley	Al Pearce, Dale Evans, Jerome Cowan	Musical	Republic
Hold That Blonde	George Marshall	Eddie Bracken, Veronica Lake, Albert Dekker	Comedy	Paramount
Hollywood and Vine	Alexis Thurn-Taxis	Wanda McKay, James Ellison, June Clyde	Comedy	PRC
Honeymoon Ahead	Reginald LeBorg	Allan Jones, Grace McDonald, Raymond Walburn	Comedy	Universal
The Horn Blows at Midnight	Raoul Walsh	Jack Benny, Alexis Smith, Dolores Moran	Comedy	Warner Bros.
Hotel Berlin	Peter Godfrey	Faye Emerson, Raymond Massey, Andrea King	Drama	Warner Bros.
House of Dracula	Erle C. Kenton	Lon Chaney, John Carradine, Onslow Stevens	Horror	Universal
The House on 92nd Street	Henry Hathaway	Lloyd Nolan, Signe Hasso, William Eythe	Drama	20th Century Fox
How Doooo You Do!!!	Ralph Murphy	Bert Gordon, Harry von Zell, Cheryl Walker	Comedy	PRC

== I–J ==
Title	Director	Cast	Genre	Notes
I Love a Bandleader	Del Lord	Phil Harris, Eddie "Rochester" Anderson, Leslie Brooks	Musical comedy	Columbia
I Love a Mystery	Henry Levin	Jim Bannon, George Macready, Nina Foch	Drama	Columbia
Identity Unknown	Walter Colmes	Richard Arlen, Cheryl Walker, Roger Pryor	Drama	Republic
I'll Remember April	Harold Young	Gloria Jean, Kirby Grant, Edward Brophy	Comedy crime	Universal
I'll Tell the World	Leslie Goodwins	Lee Tracy, Brenda Joyce, June Preisser	Comedy	Universal
In Old New Mexico	Phil Rosen	Duncan Renaldo, Martin Garralaga, Pedro de Cordoba	Western	Monogram. Cisco Kid series.
Incendiary Blonde	George Marshall	Betty Hutton, Arturo de Córdova, Barry Fitzgerald	Biography	Paramount. Story of Texas Guinan
Isle of the Dead	Mark Robson	Boris Karloff, Ellen Drew, Katherine Emery	Horror	RKO
It's a Pleasure	William A. Seiter	Sonja Henie, Michael O'Shea, Marie McDonald	Musical	RKO
It's in the Bag!	Richard Wallace	Fred Allen, Jack Benny, Don Ameche	Comedy	United Artists
The Jade Mask	Phil Rosen	Sidney Toler, Mantan Moreland, Edwin Luke	Mystery	Monogram
Jealousy	Gustav Machaty	John Loder, Jane Randolph, Karen Morley	Thriller	Republic
Johnny Angel	Edwin L. Marin	George Raft, Claire Trevor, Signe Hasso	Drama	RKO
The Jungle Captive	Harold Young	Otto Kruger, Amelita Ward, Jerome Cowan	Horror	Universal
Junior Miss	George Seaton	Peggy Ann Garner, Faye Emerson, Allyn Joslyn	Comedy	20th Century Fox

== K–L ==
Title	Director	Cast	Genre	Notes
Keep Your Powder Dry	Edward Buzzell	Lana Turner, Laraine Day, Susan Peters	Drama	MGM
The Kid Sister	Sam Newfield	Judy Clark, Roger Pryor, Constance Worth	Comedy	PRC
Kiss and Tell	Richard Wallace	Shirley Temple, Jerome Courtland, Walter Abel	Comedy	Columbia
Kitty	Mitchell Leisen	Paulette Goddard, Ray Milland, Patric Knowles	Drama	Paramount
The Lady Confesses	Sam Newfield	Mary Beth Hughes, Hugh Beaumont, Claudia Drake	Film Noir	PRC
Lady on a Train	Charles David	Deanna Durbin, Ralph Bellamy, George Coulouris	Film noir	Universal
Lawless Empire	Vernon Keays	Charles Starrett, Dub Taylor, Ethan Laidlaw	Western	Columbia
Leave Her to Heaven	John M. Stahl	Gene Tierney, Jeanne Crain, Cornel Wilde, Vincent Price	Film noir	20th Century Fox; 4 Oscar nominations
Leave It to Blondie	Abby Berlin	Penny Singleton, Arthur Lake, Marjorie Weaver	Comedy	Columbia
Let's Go Steady	Del Lord	Jackie Moran, June Preisser, Jimmy Lloyd	Musical	Columbia
Life with Blondie	Abby Berlin	Penny Singleton, Arthur Lake, Jonathan Hale	Comedy	Columbia
Lightning Raiders	Sam Newfield	Buster Crabbe, Al St. John, Steve Darrell	Western	PRC
Lone Texas Ranger	Spencer Gordon Bennet	Wild Bill Elliott, Helen Talbot, Roy Barcroft	Western	Republic
The Lonesome Trail	Oliver Drake	Jimmy Wakely, Lorraine Miller, Horace Murphy	Western	Monogram
The Lost Trail	Lambert Hillyer	Johnny Mack Brown, Raymond Hatton, Jennifer Holt	Western	Monogram
The Lost Weekend	Billy Wilder	Ray Milland, Jane Wyman, Doris Dowling	Drama	Paramount; winner of 4 Academy Awards
Love, Honor and Goodbye	Albert S. Rogell	Virginia Bruce, Edward Ashley, Nils Asther	Comedy	Republic
Love Letters	William Dieterle	Jennifer Jones, Joseph Cotten, Ann Richards	Drama	Paramount

== M ==
Title	Director	Cast	Genre	Notes
Main Street After Dark	Edward L. Cahn	Edward Arnold, Selena Royle, Audrey Totter	Drama	MGM
Mama Loves Papa	Frank R. Strayer	Leon Errol, Elisabeth Risdon, Edwin Maxwell	Comedy	RKO
Man Alive	Ray Enright	Pat O'Brien, Ellen Drew, Adolphe Menjou	Comedy	RKO
The Man in Half Moon Street	Ralph Murphy	Helen Walker, Nils Asther, Paul Cavanagh	Horror, Science Fiction	Paramount
The Man from Oklahoma	Frank McDonald	Roy Rogers, Dale Evans, Roger Pryor	Western	Republic
The Man Who Walked Alone	Christy Cabanne	Kay Aldridge, Dave O'Brien, Walter Catlett	Mystery	PRC
Marked for Murder	Elmer Clifton	Tex Ritter, Dave O'Brien, Guy Wilkerson	Western	PRC
Marshal of Laredo	R. G. Springsteen	Wild Bill Elliott, Peggy Stewart, Alice Fleming	Western	Republic
Masquerade in Mexico	Mitchell Leisen	Dorothy Lamour, Patric Knowles, Ann Dvorak	Musical	Paramount
A Medal for Benny	Irving Pichel	Dorothy Lamour, Arturo de Córdova, J. Carrol Naish	Drama	Paramount
Men in Her Diary	Charles Barton	Peggy Ryan, Jon Hall, Louise Allbritton	Comedy	Universal
Mexicana	Alfred Santell	Tito Guízar, Constance Moore, Estelita Rodriguez	Musical	Republic
Midnight Manhunt	William C. Thomas	William Gargan, Ann Savage, George Zucco	Film noir	Paramount
Mildred Pierce	Michael Curtiz	Joan Crawford, Zachary Scott, Ann Blyth, Jack Carson	Film noir	Warner Bros. From book by James M. Cain; Oscar for Crawford
The Missing Corpse	Albert Herman	J. Edward Bromberg, Isabel Randolph, Eric Sinclair	Mystery	PRC
Molly and Me	Lewis Seiler	Gracie Fields, Monty Woolley, Roddy McDowall	Musical comedy	20th Century Fox
Mr. Muggs Rides Again	Wallace Fox	Leo Gorcey, Huntz Hall, George Meeker	Comedy	Monogram
Murder, He Says	George Marshall	Fred MacMurray, Helen Walker, Marjorie Main	Mystery	Paramount
My Name Is Julia Ross	Joseph H. Lewis	Nina Foch, Dame May Whitty, George Macready	Film noir	Columbia

== N–O ==
Title	Director	Cast	Genre	Notes
Navajo Kid	Harry L. Fraser	Bob Steele, Caren Marsh, Stanley Blystone	Western	PRC
The Navajo Trail	Howard Bretherton	Johnny Mack Brown, Raymond Hatton, Jennifer Holt	Western	Monogram
The Naughty Nineties	Jean Yarbrough	Abbott and Costello, Alan Curtis, Lois Collier	Comedy	Universal
Night Club Girl	Edward F. Cline	Vivian Austin, Judy Clark, Edward Norris	Comedy	Universal
Nob Hill	Henry Hathaway	George Raft, Joan Bennett, Vivian Blaine	Drama	20th Century Fox
Northwest Trail	Derwin Abrahams	Bob Steele, Joan Woodbury, Raymond Hatton	Western	Lippert
Objective, Burma!	Raoul Walsh	Errol Flynn, William Prince, George Tobias	War	Warner Bros.
On Stage Everybody	Jean Yarbrough	Jack Oakie, Peggy Ryan, Otto Kruger	Musical	Universal
Oregon Trail	Thomas Carr	Sunset Carson, Peggy Stewart, Frank Jaquet	Western	Republic
Our Vines Have Tender Grapes	Roy Rowland	Edward G. Robinson, Margaret O'Brien, James Craig	Drama	MGM
Out of the Depths	D. Ross Lederman	Jim Bannon, Ross Hunter, Ken Curtis	War	Columbia
Out of This World	Hal Walker	Veronica Lake, Eddie Bracken, Diana Lynn, Cass Daley	Comedy	Paramount
Outlaws of the Rockies	Ray Nazarro	Charles Starrett, Carole Mathews, Dub Taylor	Western	Columbia
Over 21	Charles Vidor	Irene Dunne, Alexander Knox, Charles Coburn	Comedy	Columbia

== P–Q ==
Title	Director	Cast	Genre	Notes
Pan-Americana	John H. Auer	Phillip Terry, Eve Arden, Audrey Long	Romance	RKO
Pardon My Past	Leslie Fenton	Fred MacMurray, Marguerite Chapman, William Demarest	Comedy	Columbia
Paris Underground	Gregory Ratoff	Constance Bennett, Gracie Fields, George Rigaud	Drama	United Artists
Patrick the Great	Frank Ryan	Donald O'Connor, Peggy Ryan, Eve Arden	Comedy	Universal
Penthouse Rhythm	Edward F. Cline	Kirby Grant, Lois Collier, Eric Blore	Comedy	Universal
The Phantom of 42nd Street	Albert Herman	Dave O'Brien, Kay Aldridge, Alan Mowbray	Mystery	PRC
Phantom of the Plains	Lesley Selander	Wild Bill Elliott, Alice Fleming, Virginia Christine	Western	Republic
The Phantom Speaks	John English	Richard Arlen, Lynne Roberts, Stanley Ridges	Horror	Republic
The Picture of Dorian Gray	Albert Lewin	George Sanders, Hurd Hatfield, Donna Reed, Peter Lawford	Suspense	MGM
Pillow of Death	Wallace Fox	Lon Chaney Jr., Brenda Joyce, J. Edward Bromberg	Horror	Universal
Pillow to Post	Vincent Sherman	Ida Lupino, Sydney Greenstreet, William Prince	Comedy	Warner Bros.
The Power of the Whistler	Lew Landers	Richard Dix, Janis Carter, Jeff Donnell	Mystery	Columbia
Prairie Rustlers	Sam Newfield	Buster Crabbe, Evelyn Finley, Al St. John	Western	PRC
Pride of the Marines	Delmer Daves	John Garfield, Eleanor Parker, Dane Clark	War Biography	Warner Bros.
Prison Ship	Arthur Dreifuss	Nina Foch, Robert Lowery, Ludwig Donath	War	Columbia
Pursuit to Algiers	Roy William Neill	Basil Rathbone, Nigel Bruce, Marjorie Riordan	Mystery	Universal. Sherlock Holmes

== R ==
Title	Director	Cast	Genre	Notes
Radio Stars on Parade	Leslie Goodwins	Brown and Carney, Frances Langford, Sheldon Leonard	Comedy	RKO
Renegades of the Rio Grande	Howard Bretherton	Rod Cameron, Jennifer Holt, Fuzzy Knight	Western	Universal
The Return of the Durango Kid	Derwin Abrahams	Charles Starrett, John Calvert, Dick Botiller	Western	Columbia
Rhapsody in Blue	Irving Rapper	Robert Alda, Alexis Smith, Joan Leslie	Biography	Warner Bros. Story of George Gershwin
Rhythm Round-Up	Vernon Keays	Ken Curtis, Cheryl Walker, Raymond Hatton	Western musical	Columbia
Riders of the Dawn	Oliver Drake	Jimmy Wakely, Sarah Padden, Horace Murphy	Western	Monogram
River Gang	Charles David	Gloria Jean, John Qualen, Keefe Brasselle	Crime	Universal
Road to Alcatraz	Nick Grinde	Robert Lowery, June Storey, Grant Withers	Crime	Republic
Rockin' in the Rockies	Vernon Keays	The Three Stooges, Mary Beth Hughes, Jay Kirby	Western musical	Columbia
Rough Riders of Cheyenne	Thomas Carr	Sunset Carson, Peggy Stewart, Mira McKinney	Western	Republic
Rough Ridin' Justice	Derwin Abrahams	Charles Starrett, Dub Taylor, Wheeler Oakman	Western	Columbia
Roughly Speaking	Michael Curtiz	Rosalind Russell, Jack Carson, Robert Hutton	Comedy drama	Warner Bros.
Rough, Tough and Ready	Del Lord	Chester Morris, Victor McLaglen, Jean Rogers	Action	Columbia
A Royal Scandal	Otto Preminger	Tallulah Bankhead, Charles Coburn, Anne Baxter	Comedy	20th Century Fox
Rustlers' Hideout	Sam Newfield	Buster Crabbe, Al St. John, Patti McCarty	Western	PRC
Rustlers of the Badlands	Derwin Abrahams	Charles Starrett, Carla Balenda, Dub Taylor	Western	Columbia

== S ==
Title	Director	Cast	Genre	Notes
Saddle Serenade	Oliver Drake	Jimmy Wakely, Jack Ingram, Lee White	Western	Monogram
Sagebrush Heroes	Benjamin H. Kline	Charles Starrett, Constance Worth, Dub Taylor	Western	Columbia
Salome, Where She Danced	Charles Lamont	Yvonne De Carlo, Rod Cameron, Walter Slezak	Drama	Universal
The Sailor Takes a Wife	Richard Whorf	Robert Walker, June Allyson, Audrey Totter	Comedy	MGM
Salty O'Rourke	Raoul Walsh	Alan Ladd, Gail Russell, William Demarest	Drama	Paramount
San Antonio	Robert Florey	Errol Flynn, Alexis Smith, S. Z. Sakall	Western	Warner Bros.
Santa Fe Saddlemates	Thomas Carr	Sunset Carson, Linda Stirling, Roy Barcroft	Western	Republic
Saratoga Trunk	Sam Wood	Gary Cooper, Ingrid Bergman, Flora Robson	Drama	Warner Bros.
Scared Stiff	Frank McDonald	Jack Haley, Ann Savage, Veda Ann Borg	Mystery	Paramount
Scarlet Street	Fritz Lang	Edward G. Robinson, Joan Bennett, Dan Duryea	Film noir	Universal
The Scarlet Clue	Phil Rosen	Sidney Toler, Mantan Moreland, Ben Carter	Mystery	Monogram
Scotland Yard Investigator	George Blair	C. Aubrey Smith, Erich von Stroheim, Stephanie Bachelor	Crime	Republic
Secrets of a Sorority Girl	Frank Wisbar	Rick Vallin, Ray Walker, Marie Harmon	Crime	PRC
See My Lawyer	Edward F. Cline	Ole Olsen, Chic Johnson, Grace McDonald	Comedy	Universal
Senorita from the West	Frank Strayer	Allan Jones, Bonita Granville, George Cleveland	Western comedy	Universal
Sensation Hunters	Christy Cabanne	Doris Merrick, Robert Lowery, Constance Worth	Drama	Monogram
Shadows of Death	Sam Newfield	Buster Crabbe, Al St. John, Charles King	Western	PRC
Shadow of Terror	Lew Landers	Richard Fraser, Cy Kendall, Emmett Lynn	Thriller	PRC
Shady Lady	George Waggner	Charles Coburn, Ginny Simms, Robert Paige	Comedy	Universal
The Shanghai Cobra	Phil Karlson	Sidney Toler, Mantan Moreland, Joan Barclay	Mystery	Monogram. Charlie Chan
Sheriff of Cimarron	Yakima Canutt	Sunset Carson, Linda Stirling, Olin Howland	Western	Republic
Sherlock Holmes and the House of Fear	Roy William Neill	Basil Rathbone, Nigel Bruce, Paul Cavanagh	Mystery	Universal
She Gets Her Man	Erle C. Kenton	Joan Davis, William Gargan, Vivian Austin	Comedy	Universal
She Went to the Races	Willis Goldbeck	James Craig, Frances Gifford, Ava Gardner	Comedy	MGM
She Wouldn't Say Yes	Alexander Hall	Rosalind Russell, Lee Bowman, Adele Jergens	Comedy	Columbia
Sing Me a Song of Texas	Vernon Keays	Rosemary Lane, Tom Tyler, Carole Mathews	Western	Columbia
Sing Your Way Home	Anthony Mann	Jack Haley, Marcy McGuire, Anne Jeffreys	Musical	RKO
Snafu	Jack Moss	Robert Benchley, Barbara Jo Allen, Conrad Janis	Comedy	Columbia
Son of Lassie	S. Sylvan Simon	June Lockhart, Peter Lawford, Nigel Bruce	Family drama	MGM
A Song for Miss Julie	William Rowland	Shirley Ross, Barton Hepburn, Jane Farrar	Musical	Republic
Song of Mexico	James A. Fitzpatrick	Adele Mara, Edgar Barrier, Jacqueline Dalya	Musical	Republic
Song of Old Wyoming	Robert Emmett Tansey	Eddie Dean, Sarah Padden, Jennifer Holt	Western	PRC
Song of the Prairie	Ray Nazarro	Ken Curtis, June Storey, Jeff Donnell	Western	Columbia
Song of the Sarong	Harold Young	William Gargan, Nancy Kelly, Eddie Quillan	Adventure	Universal
A Song to Remember	Charles Vidor	Cornel Wilde, Merle Oberon, Paul Muni	Biography	Columbia. Story of Frédéric Chopin
South of the Rio Grande	Lambert Hillyer	Duncan Renaldo, Martin Garralaga, Lillian Molieri	Western	Monogram
The Southerner	Jean Renoir	Zachary Scott, Betty Field, J. Carrol Naish	Drama	United Artists
The Spanish Main	Frank Borzage	Maureen O'Hara, Paul Henreid, Walter Slezak	Adventure	RKO
Spellbound	Alfred Hitchcock	Gregory Peck, Ingrid Bergman, Leo G. Carroll	Suspense	United Artists
The Spider	Robert D. Webb	Richard Conte, Faye Marlowe, Cara Williams	Film noir	20th Century Fox
A Sporting Chance	George Blair	Jane Randolph, Edward Gargan, Isabel Withers	Drama	Republic
Springtime in Texas	Oliver Drake	Jimmy Wakely, Dennis Moore, Marie Harmon	Western	Monogram
Stagecoach Outlaws	Sam Newfield	Buster Crabbe, Al St. John, Kermit Maynard	Western	PRC
State Fair	Walter Lang	Jeanne Crain, Dana Andrews, Vivian Blaine	Musical comedy	20th Century Fox. Also filmed in 1933 and 1962
Steppin' in Society	Alexander Esway	Edward Everett Horton, Gladys George, Ruth Terry	Comedy	Republic
The Stork Club	Hal Walker	Betty Hutton, Barry Fitzgerald, Don DeFore	Musical	Paramount
The Story of G.I. Joe	William Wellman	Burgess Meredith, Robert Mitchum, Freddie Steele	War	United Artists. 4 Oscar nominations
The Strange Affair of Uncle Harry	Robert Siodmak	George Sanders, Geraldine Fitzgerald, Ella Raines	Film noir	Universal
Strange Holiday	Arch Oboler	Claude Rains, Barbara Bates, Gloria Holden	Drama	PRC
Strange Illusion	Edgar G. Ulmer	Jimmy Lydon, Warren William, Sally Eilers	Film noir	PRC
The Strange Mr. Gregory	Phil Rosen	Edmund Lowe, Jean Rogers, Marjorie Hoshelle	Mystery	Monogram
Stranger from Santa Fe	Lambert Hillyer	Johnny Mack Brown, Raymond Hatton, Beatrice Gray	Western	Monogram
Sudan	John Rawlins	Maria Montez, Jon Hall, Turhan Bey	Adventure	Universal
Sunbonnet Sue	Ralph Murphy	Gale Storm, Phil Regan, Alan Mowbray	Musical comedy	Monogram
Sunset in El Dorado	Frank McDonald	Roy Rogers, Dale Evans, Margaret Dumont	Western	Republic
Swingin' on a Rainbow	William Beaudine	Jane Frazee, Harry Langdon, Minna Gombell	Comedy	Republic
Swing Out, Sister	Edward C. Lilley	Rod Cameron, Billie Burke, Arthur Treacher	Musical	Universal

== T ==
Title	Director	Cast	Genre	Notes
Tarzan and the Amazons	Kurt Neumann	Johnny Weissmuller, Brenda Joyce, Johnny Sheffield	Adventure	RKO
Tell It to a Star	Frank McDonald	Ruth Terry, Robert Livingston, Alan Mowbray	Musical	Republic
Ten Cents a Dance	Will Jason	Jane Frazee, Mark Roberts, Joan Woodbury	Comedy	Columbia
Texas Panhandle	Ray Nazarro	Charles Starrett, Carolina Cotton, Dub Taylor	Western	Columbia
That Night with You	William A. Seiter	Franchot Tone, Susanna Foster, Louise Allbritton	Comedy	Universal
That's the Spirit	Charles Lamont	Peggy Ryan, Jack Oakie, June Vincent	Comedy	Universal
There Goes Kelly	Phil Karlson	Jackie Moran, Wanda McKay, Sidney Miller	Comedy	Monogram
They Were Expendable	John Ford	John Wayne, Robert Montgomery, Donna Reed	War	MGM
This Love of Ours	William Dieterle	Merle Oberon, Claude Rains, Charles Korvin	Romance	Universal
This Man's Navy	William Wellman	Wallace Beery, Tom Drake, Jan Clayton	Drama	MGM
Those Endearing Young Charms	Lewis Allen	Robert Young, Laraine Day, Ann Harding	Comedy	RKO
A Thousand and One Nights	Alfred E. Green	Cornel Wilde, Phil Silvers, Evelyn Keyes	Fantasy	Columbia
Three in the Saddle	Harry L. Fraser	Tex Ritter, Lorraine Miller, Guy Wilkerson	Western	PRC
Three's a Crowd	Dane Lussier	Pamela Blake, Gertrude Michael, Pierre Watkin	Mystery	Republic
Thrill of a Romance	Richard Thorpe	Van Johnson, Esther Williams, Frances Gifford	Romance	MGM
Thunderhead, Son of Flicka	Louis King	Roddy McDowall, Preston Foster, Rita Johnson	Drama, Family, Western	20th Century Fox
The Tiger Woman	Philip Ford	Adele Mara, Peggy Stewart, Kane Richmond	Crime	Republic
Tonight and Every Night	Victor Saville	Rita Hayworth, Lee Bowman, Janet Blair	Drama	Columbia. 2 Oscar nominations
Too Young to Know	Frederick de Cordova	Joan Leslie, Robert Hutton, Dolores Moran	Drama	Warner Bros.
The Topeka Terror	Howard Bretherton	Allan Lane, Linda Stirling, Roy Barcroft	Western	Republic
Trail of Kit Carson	Lesley Selander	Allan Lane, Helen Talbot, Roy Barcroft	Western	Republic
Trail to Vengeance	Wallace Fox	Kirby Grant, Jane Adams, Fuzzy Knight	Western	Universal
A Tree Grows in Brooklyn	Elia Kazan	Dorothy McGuire, James Dunn, Joan Blondell	Drama	20th Century Fox. From novel by Betty Smith; Oscar for Dunn; Remade in 1974
Trouble Chasers	Lew Landers	Billy Gilbert, Maxie Rosenbloom, Shemp Howard	Comedy	Monogram
Twice Blessed	Harry Beaumont	Preston Foster, Lee and Lyn Wilde, Gail Patrick	Comedy	MGM
Two O'Clock Courage	Anthony Mann	Tom Conway, Ann Rutherford, Jean Brooks	Film noir	RKO

== U–W ==
Title	Director	Cast	Genre	Notes
Under Western Skies	Jean Yarbrough	Martha O'Driscoll, Noah Beery Jr., Leo Carrillo	Western	Universal
The Unseen	Lewis Allen	Gail Russell, Joel McCrea, Herbert Marshall	Thriller	Paramount
Utah	John English	Roy Rogers, Dale Evans, Peggy Stewart	Western	Republic
The Valley of Decision	Tay Garnett	Greer Garson, Gregory Peck, Donald Crisp	Drama	MGM
The Vampire's Ghost	Lesley Selander	John Abbott, Adele Mara, Peggy Stewart	Horror	Republic
Voice of the Whistler	William Castle	Richard Dix, Lynn Merrick, Rhys Williams	Mystery	Columbia
Wagon Wheels Westward	R. G. Springsteen	Wild Bill Elliott, Linda Stirling, Alice Fleming	Western	Republic
A Walk in the Sun	Lewis Milestone	Dana Andrews, Richard Conte, Lloyd Bridges	War drama	20th Century Fox
Wanderer of the Wasteland	Wallace Grissell, Edward Killy	James Warren, Audrey Long, Richard Martin	Western	RKO
Week-End at the Waldorf	Robert Z. Leonard	Lana Turner, Ginger Rogers, Walter Pidgeon	Romantic comedy	MGM
West of the Pecos	Edward Killy	Robert Mitchum, Barbara Hale, Richard Martin	Western	RKO
What a Blonde	Leslie Goodwins	Leon Errol, Elaine Riley, Veda Ann Borg	Comedy	RKO
What Next, Corporal Hargrove?	Richard Thorpe	Robert Walker, Keenan Wynn, Jean Porter	Comedy	MGM
Where Do We Go from Here?	Gregory Ratoff	Fred MacMurray, Joan Leslie, June Haver	Musical	20th Century Fox
White Pongo	Sam Newfield	Richard Fraser, Maris Wrixon, Lionel Royce	Adventure	PRC
Why Girls Leave Home	William Berke	Lola Lane, Pamela Blake, Sheldon Leonard	Drama	PRC
Wildfire	Robert Emmett Tansey	Bob Steele, Sterling Holloway, John Miljan	Western	Lippert
Within These Walls	H. Bruce Humberstone	Thomas Mitchell, Mary Anderson, Mark Stevens	Drama	20th Century Fox
Without Love	Harold S. Bucquet	Spencer Tracy, Katharine Hepburn, Lucille Ball	Comedy	MGM
The Woman in Green	Roy William Neill	Basil Rathbone, Nigel Bruce, Hillary Brooke	Mystery	Universal. Sherlock Holmes
The Woman Who Came Back	Walter Colmes	Nancy Kelly, John Loder, Otto Kruger	Horror	Republic
Wonder Man	H. Bruce Humberstone	Danny Kaye, Virginia Mayo, Vera-Ellen	Musical Fantasy Comedy	RKO

== Y–Z ==
Title	Director	Cast	Genre	Notes
Yolanda and the Thief	Vincente Minnelli	Fred Astaire, Lucille Bremer, Frank Morgan	Musical comedy	MGM
You Came Along	John Farrow	Lizabeth Scott, Robert Cummings, Julie Bishop	Comedy	Paramount. Screenplay by Ayn Rand
Youth on Trial	Budd Boetticher	Cora Sue Collins, Robert B. Williams, John Calvert	Drama	Columbia
Ziegfeld Follies	Vincente Minnelli	Fred Astaire, Lucille Ball, Judy Garland	Musical revue	MGM
Zombies on Broadway	Gordon Douglas	Wally Brown, Bela Lugosi, Anne Jeffreys	Horror comedy	RKO

== Documentaries ==
Title	Director	Cast	Genre	Notes
6th Marine Division on Okinawa		Harlon Block	Documentary	Oscar-nominated film on Battle of Okinawa
Appointment in Tokyo	Jack Hively		Documentary	produced by Army Pictorial Service, Signal Corps
The Battle of San Pietro	John Huston	Mark W. Clark, John Huston (narrator)	Documentary	Short subject
Death Mills	Billy Wilder		Documentary	
Fury in the Pacific			Documentary	U.S. Armed Forces
Here Is Germany	Frank Capra		Documentary	U.S. military propaganda
The House I Live In	Mervyn LeRoy	Frank Sinatra	Documentary	10 minutes
The Last Bomb			Documentary	U.S. military propaganda
Mom and Dad			Documentary	Hygiene film
Mr. and Mrs. America			Documentary	produced by U.S. Treasury
The Nazi Plan	George Stevens		Documentary	
Saga of the Franklin			War, Documentary	U.S. Navy production
Target Invisible			Documentary	U.S. Treasury film
To the Shores of Iwo Jima			War Documentary	
Topaz			War documentary	
The True Glory	Carol Reed		War documentary	
War Comes to America			War documentary	
Your Job In Germany			War, Documentary	

== Serials ==
Title	Director	Cast	Genre	Notes
Brenda Starr, Reporter	Wallace Fox	Joan Woodbury	Serial	Columbia
Federal Operator 99		Helen Talbot, Lorna Gray	Serial	Republic
Jungle Queen	Lewis D. Collins, Ray Taylor	Ruth Roman	Serial	Universal
Jungle Raiders	Lesley Selander	Veda Ann Borg, Kane Richmond	Serial	Universal
Manhunt of Mystery Island	3 directors	Linda Stirling, Richard Bailey	Serial	15 parts
The Master Key	Lewis D. Collins and Ray Taylor	Milburn Stone	Serial	
The Purple Monster Strikes	Spencer Gordon Bennet, Fred C. Brannon	Dennis Moore	Adventure Serial	
The Royal Mounted Rides Again	Lewis D. Collins and Ray Taylor	Bill Kennedy, Milburn Stone	Serial	Universal
Secret Agent X-9	Lewis D. Collins and Ray Taylor	Lloyd Bridges, Keye Luke	Serial	Universal
Strange Confession	John Hoffman	Lon Chaney Jr., Brenda Joyce	Serial	Universal
Who's Guilty?	Wallace Grissell	Robert Kent, Amelita Ward	Serial	Columbia

== Shorts ==
Title	Director	Cast	Genre	Notes
Booby Dupes	Del Lord	The Three Stooges	Comedy Short	Columbia
Draftee Daffy	Bob Clampett	Daffy Duck	Animated	Warner Bros.
Flirty Birdy			Animated	
The Friendly Ghost	I. Sparber	Casper	Animated	
Hare Tonic		Bugs Bunny	Animated	Warner Bros.
Hare Trigger		Bugs Bunny	Animated	Warner Bros.
Herr Meets Hare		Bugs Bunny	Animated	Warner Bros.
Hockey Homicide	Jack Kinney	Goofy	Animated	Disney
Idiots Deluxe	Jules White	The Three Stooges	Short	Columbia
If a Body Meets a Body	Jules White	The Three Stooges	Short	Columbia
Intelligence and the Japanese Civilian			Propaganda	
It Happened in Harlem	Bud Pollard	Chris Columbus	Musical comedy	All-American News
Know Your Enemy: Japan			Propaganda	
Life with Feathers	Friz Freleng	Tweety, Sylvester	Animated	
Micro-Phonies	Edward Bernds	The Three Stooges	Short	Columbia
The Mouse Comes to Dinner	Hanna-Barbera	Tom and Jerry	Animated	MGM
My Japan			Propaganda	
Okinawa Bulletins			War propaganda	
Our Job in Japan			War propaganda	
Quiet Please!	Hanna-Barbera	Tom and Jerry	Animated	
Remember These Faces			War propaganda	Filmed by U.S. Navy
The Stilwell Road		Narrated by Ronald Reagan	War propaganda	
The Story of the 14th Air Force				
Swing Shift Cinderella	Tex Avery		Animated	MGM
A Tale of Two Mice	Frank Tashlin		Animated	
Tee for Two	Hanna-Barbera	Tom and Jerry	Animated	
The Three Caballeros	Norm Ferguson		Animation	RKO, Disney
Three Pests in a Mess	Del Lord	The Three Stooges	Short subject	Columbia Pictures
The Town	Josef von Sternberg		War propaganda	
Wings for This Man		Narrated by Ronald Reagan	War propaganda	

== See also ==
- 1945 in the United States
