= The Utah Kid =

The Utah Kid may refer to:

- The Utah Kid (1930 film). an American Western film directed by Richard Thorpe
- The Utah Kid (1944 film). an American Western film directed by Vernon Keays
- "The Utah Kid", a fictional deceased outlaw whose missing loot is central to the plot of "Angry Town", a 1960 episode of the Western TV series "Tales of Wells Fargo".
