= Sing Neighbor Sing =

1944 film by Frank McDonald

Sing, Neighbor, Sing
- Directed by: Frank McDonald
- Screenplay by: Dorrell McGowan; Stuart E. McGowan
- Produced by: Donald H. Brown
- Starring: Stanley Brown; Ruth Terry; Roy Acuff; Virginia Brissac; Rachel Veach; Myrtle Wiseman; Scotty Wiseman
- Cinematography: Reggie Lanning
- Edited by: Ralph Dixon
- Music by: R. Dale Butts
- Production company: Republic Pictures
- Distributed by: Republic Pictures
- Release date: August 12, 1944
- Running time: 70 minutes
- Country: United States
- Language: English

Sing, Neighbor, Sing is a 1944 American musical film directed by Frank McDonald and written by Dorrell McGowan and Stuart E. McGowan. Starring Stanley Brown, Ruth Terry, Roy Acuff, Virginia Brissac, Rachel Veach, Myrtle Wiseman and Scotty Wiseman, it was released on August 12, 1944, by Republic Pictures.

== Cast ==
- Stanley Brown as Bob Reed, Posing as Professor Jasper Cartwright
- Ruth Terry as Virginia Blake
- Roy Acuff as Roy Acuff
- Virginia Brissac as Cornelia Blake
- Rachel Veach as Rachel
- Myrtle Wiseman as Lulubelle
- Scotty Wiseman as Scotty
- Beverly Lloyd as Beverly
- Charles Irwin as Professor Jasper Cartwright
- Olin Howland as Joe the Barber
- Maxine Doyle as Maxine
- Mary Kenyon as Mary
- Harry Cheshire as Dean Cheshire
- The Milo Twins as The Singing Twins
- Carolina Cotton as Carolina
- Roy Acuff's Smoky Mountain Boys and Girls as Roy Acuff Band Members
