= Trigger Law =

1944 American Western film

- Directed by: Vernon Keays
- Written by: Victor Hammond
- Produced by: Charles J. Bigelow; William Strohbach
- Starring: Hoot Gibson; Bob Steele; Beatrice Gray
- Cinematography: Marcel Le Picard
- Edited by: John C. Fuller
- Music by: Frank Sanucci
- Production company: Monogram Pictures
- Distributed by: Monogram Pictures
- Release date: September 30, 1944
- Running time: 56 minutes
- Country: United States
- Language: English

Trigger Law is a 1944 American Western film directed by Vernon Keays and starring Hoot Gibson, Bob Steele and Beatrice Gray.

== Cast ==
- Hoot Gibson as Hoot Gibson
- Bob Steele as Bob Steele
- Beatrice Gray as Sally Buchanan
- Ralph Lewis as Tom Buchanan
- Ed Cassidy as Johnson
- Jack Ingram as Kelso McGuire
- George Eldredge as Corey
- Pierce Lyden as Ace
- Lane Chandler as Tex
- Bud Osborne as Furness
- George Morrell as Keno
- Terry Frost as Randall

== Bibliography ==
- Martin, Len D. The Allied Artists Checklist: The Feature Films and Short Subjects of Allied Artists Pictures Corporation, 1947-1978. McFarland & Company, 1993.
