= Trail to Gunsight =

1944 film by Vernon Keays

- Theatrical release poster
- Directed by: Vernon Keays
- Screenplay by: Bennett Cohen; Patricia Harper
- Story by: Jay Karth
- Produced by: Oliver Drake
- Starring: Eddie Dew; Lyle Talbot; Fuzzy Knight; Ray Whitley; Maris Wrixon; Robert 'Buzz' Henry; Marie Austin; Sarah Padden; Glenn Strange
- Cinematography: Maury Gertsman
- Edited by: Russell F. Schoengarth
- Production company: Universal Pictures
- Distributed by: Universal Pictures
- Release date: August 18, 1944
- Running time: 57 minutes
- Country: United States
- Language: English

Trail to Gunsight is a 1944 American Western film directed by Vernon Keays and written by Bennett Cohen and Patricia Harper. The film stars Eddie Dew, Lyle Talbot, Fuzzy Knight, Ray Whitley, Maris Wrixon, Robert 'Buzz' Henry, Marie Austin, Sarah Padden and Glenn Strange. The film was released on August 18, 1944, by Universal Pictures.

== Cast ==
- Eddie Dew as Dan Creede
- Lyle Talbot as Bill Hollister
- Fuzzy Knight as Horatius Van Sickle
- Ray Whitley as Barton
- Maris Wrixon as Mary Wagner
- Robert 'Buzz' Henry as Tim Wagner
- Marie Austin as Clementine Van Sickle
- Sarah Padden as Ma Wagner
- Glenn Strange as Duke Ellis
- Ray Bennett as Bert Nelson
- Charles Morton as Reb Tanner
- Ezra Paulette as Accordion player
- Aleth Hansen as Mandolin Player
- Charles Quirk as Guitar Player
