= Jamboree (1944 film) =

1944 film by Joseph Santley

- Directed by: Joseph Santley
- Screenplay by: Jack Townley
- Story by: Jack Townley; Taylor Caven
- Produced by: Armand Schaefer
- Starring: Ruth Terry; George Byron; Paul Harvey; Edwin Stanley; Freddie Fisher; Ernest Tubb
- Cinematography: William Bradford
- Edited by: Richard L. Van Enger
- Music by: Joseph Dubin
- Production company: Republic Pictures
- Distributed by: Republic Pictures
- Release date: May 5, 1944
- Running time: 71 minutes
- Country: United States
- Language: English

Jamboree is a 1944 American comedy film directed by Joseph Santley and written by Jack Townley. The film stars Ruth Terry, George Byron, Paul Harvey, Edwin Stanley, Freddie Fisher and Ernest Tubb. The film was released on May 5, 1944, by Republic Pictures.

== Cast ==
- Ruth Terry as Ruth Cartwright
- George Byron as Joe Mason
- Paul Harvey as P.J. Jarvis
- Edwin Stanley as Sam Smith
- Freddie Fisher as Freddie Fisher
- Freddie Fisher's Schnicklefritz Band as Harmonica Band
- Ernest Tubb as Ernest Tubb
- Ernest Tubb's Texas Troubadours as Ernest Tubb Band
- The Music Maids as Singing Trio
- Don Wilson as Don Wilson
- Isabel Randolph as Mrs. Abigail Uppington
- Rufe Davis as Rufe Davis
- Shirley Mitchell as Alice Darling
- Shug Fisher as George 'Shug' Fisher
