= Call of the Canyon =

1942 film by Joseph Santley

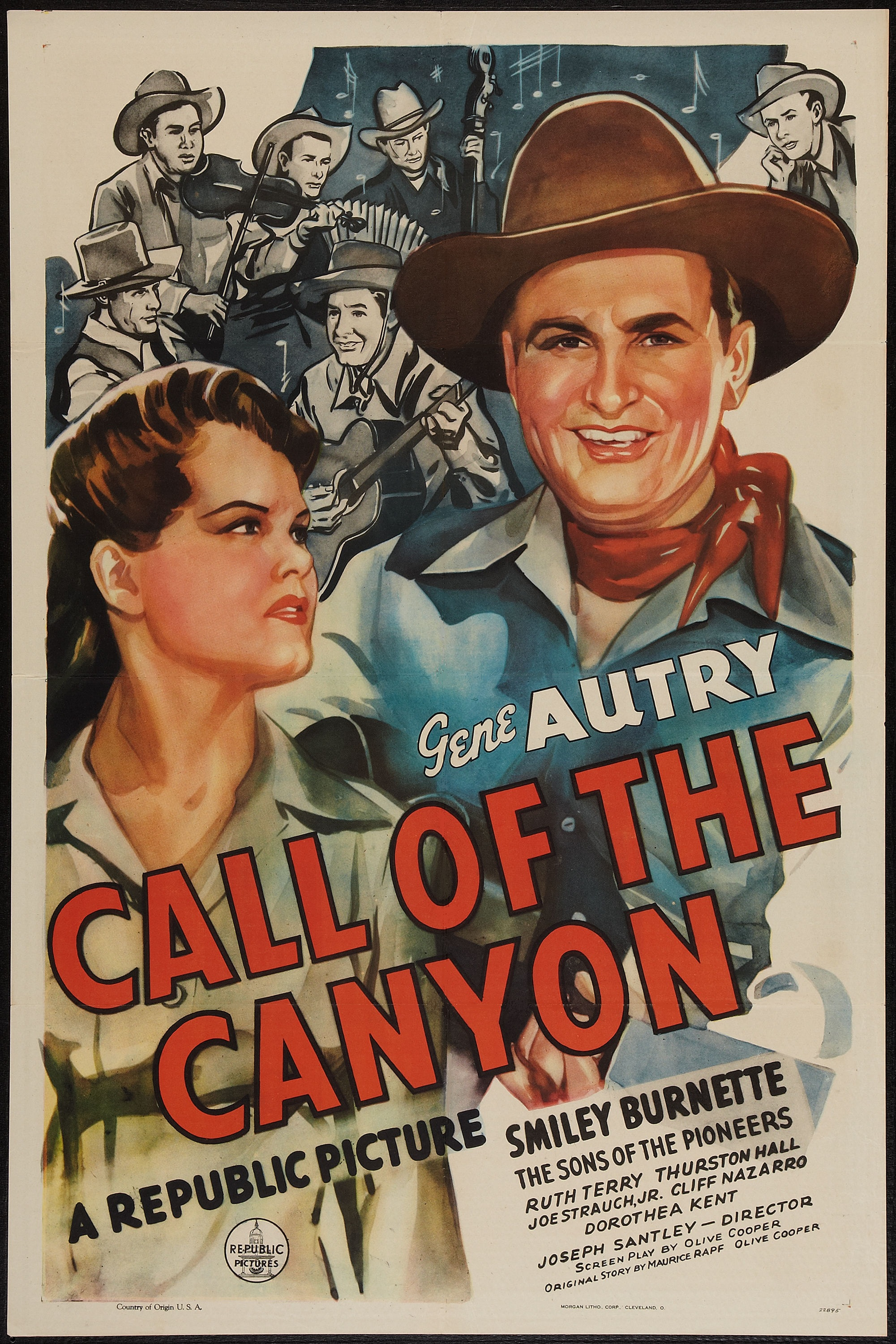
- Theatrical release poster
- Directed by: Joseph Santley
- Screenplay by: Olive Cooper
- Story by: Maurice Rapf; Olive Cooper
- Produced by: Harry Grey
- Starring: Gene Autry; Smiley Burnette; Sons of the Pioneers; Ruth Terry
- Cinematography: Reggie Lanning
- Edited by: Edward Mann
- Music by: Raoul Kraushaar (supervisor)
- Production company: Republic Pictures
- Distributed by: Republic Pictures
- Release date: August 17, 1942 (USA)
- Running time: 71 minutes
- Country: United States
- Language: English
- Budget: $129,808

Call of the Canyon is a 1942 American Western film directed by Joseph Santley and starring Gene Autry, Smiley Burnette, the Sons of the Pioneers, and Ruth Terry. Based on a story by Maurice Rapf and Olive Cooper, the film is about a singing cowboy who leads a group of cattlemen against the corrupt agent of a large packing company looking to swindle them by undercutting the buying price for beef. The film features three songs by Autry and the Sons of the Pioneers, including the classic "Take Me Back to My Boots and Saddle".

== Plot ==
Singing cowboy Gene Autry (Gene Autry) and his fellow ranchers in Whippasaw are outraged to learn that the purchasing agent for the Grantley B. Johnson Packing Co., Thomas McCoy (Edmund MacDonald), is only offering them $65 per head of cattle. Unknown to the ranchers, McCoy is a gambler in debt to a bookie who sent his henchmen Horace Dunston and the Pigeon to ensure that McCoy pays up. McCoy plans to raise the money by pocketing the difference between what he is offering the ranchers and what the packing company sent him. Gene encourages the ranchers to stick together and wait while he travels to the city to speak directly with the packing company owner, Grantley B. Johnson (Thurston Hall).

Arriving at Johnson's offices, Gene meets Katherine "Kit" Carson (Ruth Terry) and her friend, Jane Oakley (Dorothea Kent), who want Johnson to sponsor them on a radio show. Kit is unimpressed with Gene's Whippasaw origins, especially after he accidentally breaks her demo record. During her meeting with Johnson, Kit notices he is still a cowboy at heart, and lies to him, saying she intends to broadcast a western show from her ranch—in Whippasaw. Johnson agrees to visit her ranch, and then leaves before Gene has a chance to see him about the cattle prices. Returning to Whippasaw, Gene learns that his sidekick, Frog Millhouse (Smiley Burnette), rented their ranch to Kit and her fellow entertainers. Kit's feelings for Gene warm after he rescues her from a runaway carriage.

Gene convinces the ranchers to move their cattle out of McCoy's holding pens and back to grazing land until they can find a fair price. The conniving McCoy arranges to have a pilot fly over the herd and stampede the cattle. Just arriving in Whippasaw, Johnson attempts to help round up the herds, but falls from his horse and is saved by Gene from being trampled. Believing that McCoy is taking direct orders from Johnson, Gene blames G.B. Johnson for the stampede, not realizing that the stranger he just saved is in fact Johnson. Calling himself Grantley, Johnson persuades the ranchers to fight McCoy. When Kit arrives to bring Johnson back to the ranch, she agrees to pretend he's a radio promoter named "Grantley" while he gets to the bottom of the pricing scheme. Later, after hearing Gene and his friends singing, Johnson offers them a spot on his radio show, thinking they are part of Kit's troupe.

Johnson, Gene, and Frog confront McCoy one last time about the cattle pricing, but McCoy repeats his low offer, claiming that G.B. Johnson himself is setting the price. Deciding that he and the ranchers will sell to another packing company in Cloverdale, Gene tells the others, "We're not going to play into the hands of a profiteering crook." Johnson convinces Gene and the other ranchers to transport the herds the old fashioned way, by trail drive, and not rely on G.B. Johnson's railway lines. Meanwhile, Kit and her troupe are packing to leave, convinced that Johnson is only interested in Gene. When he finds out that she's leaving, Gene persuades Kit to stay in Whippasaw and put on the radio show. That night she performs at a party and later dances with Gene.

The next day, while Gene and the ranchers are moving their herds by trail to Cloverdale, McCoy sabotages their efforts by using explosives to stampede the cattle into a train tunnel and then sending a hijacked train in to kill them. As the train approaches the tunnel, Gene jumps aboard, runs to the locomotive, and stops the train in time. During the stampede, Frog's young brother Tadpole was hurt, and one of the ranchers, Dave Crosby, was killed. Upset at Crosby's death and believing that Johnson knew what was going to happen, Kit reveals his identity to Gene, but Johnson convinces Gene that he is innocent and McCoy is acting on his own. Using a microphone set up in McCoy's office, Gene obtains evidence of McCoy's guilt, then captures him, Dunston, and the Pigeon before they can escape. Afterwards, Gene and his friends join Kit Carson's Harmony Ranch radio show.

== Cast ==
- Gene Autry as Gene Autry
- Smiley Burnette as Frog Millhouse
- Sons of the Pioneers as Musicians, cowhands
- Ruth Terry as Katherine "Kit" Carson
- Thurston Hall as Grantley B. Johnson
- Joe Strauch Jr. as Tadpole Millhouse
- Cliff Nazarro as Pete Murphy
- Dorothea Kent as Jane Oakley
- Edmund MacDonald as Thomas McCoy
- Marc Lawrence as Horace Dunston
- John Harmon as The Pigeon
- John Holland as Willy Hitchcock
- Champion as Gene's Horse (uncredited)

== Production ==
=== Casting ===
Call of the Canyon was the third and final Gene Autry film featuring the Sons of the Pioneers, preceded by The Big Show and The Old Corral (1936). The group had been making films at Columbia since 1935 and had just been signed to Republic Pictures in time for this film.

=== Filming and budget ===
Call of the Canyon was filmed June 6–27, 1942. The film had an operating budget of $129,808 (equal to $2,557,826 today), and a negative cost of $129,132.

=== Stuntwork ===
- Joe Yrigoyen (Gene Autry's stunt double)
- Tex Trry (Smiley Burnette's stunt double)
- George Havens (Joe Strauch Jr.'s stunt double)
- Mary Ellen Huggins (Ruth Terry's stunt double)
- Bud Wolfe

=== Filming locations ===
- Iverson Ranch, 1 Iverson Lane, Chatsworth, Los Angeles, California, USA
- Lone Pine, California, USA
- Morrison Ranch, Agoura, California, USA
- Bronson Canyon, Griffith Park, 4730 Crystal Springs Drive, Los Angeles, California, USA

=== Soundtrack ===
- "Somebody Else Is Taking My Place" (Dick Howard, Bob Ellsworth, Russ Morgan) by Gene Autry and the Sons of the Pioneers
- "Take Me Back to My Boots and Saddle" (Walter G. Samuels, Leonard Whitcup, Teddy Powell) by Gene Autry and the Sons of the Pioneers
- "Coronation March" (Giacomo Meyerbeer) arranged by Mort Glickman and Raoul Kraushaar
- "Montana Plains" (Stuart Hamblen) by Gene Autry and the Sons of the Pioneers
- "When It's Chilly Down in Chile" (Jule Styne, Sol Meyer) by Ruth Terry
- "Call of the Canyon" (Billy Hill) by Gene Autry
- "A Cowboy Has to Sing" (Bob Nolan) by the Sons of the Pioneers

== Memorable quotes ==
- "We're not going to play into the hands of a profiteering crook." (Gene Autry)
- "I'll never know 'til I try. So I'll try." (Gene Autry)
