= Sunset in Wyoming =

1941 film by William Morgan

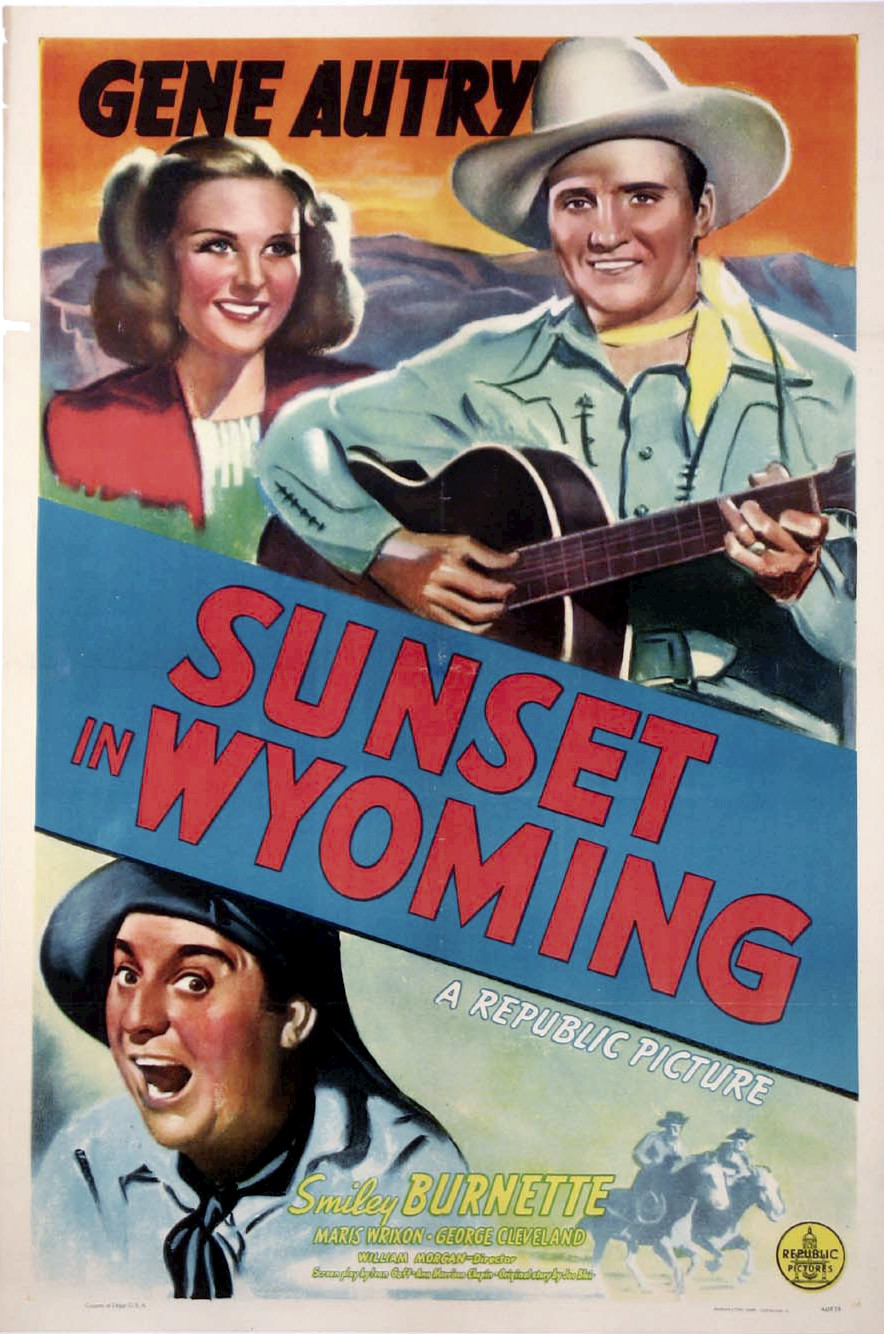
- Theatrical release poster
- Directed by: William Morgan
- Screenplay by: Ivan Goff; Anne Morrison Chapin
- Story by: Joe Blair
- Produced by: Harry Grey
- Starring: Gene Autry; Smiley Burnette; George Cleveland; Maris Wrixon
- Cinematography: Reggie Lanning
- Edited by: Tony Martinelli
- Music by: Raoul Kraushaar (supervisor)
- Production company: Republic Pictures
- Distributed by: Republic Pictures
- Release date: July 15, 1941 (U.S.)
- Running time: 66 minutes
- Country: United States
- Language: English
- Budget: $78,803

Sunset in Wyoming is a 1941 American Western film directed by William Morgan and starring Gene Autry, Smiley Burnette, George Cleveland, and Maris Wrixon. Based on a story by Joe Blair, the film is about a singing cowboy who goes up against a lumber company clearcutting the timber from a local mountain causing catastrophic flooding and endangering the lives of valley ranchers. The film features the songs "There's a Home in Wyomin'" and "Sing Me a Song of the Saddle".

== Plot ==
The Wentworth Lumber Company has been clearcutting trees on Mount Warner without considering the consequences. After one heavy rain, the ranchers in the valley suffer flood damage to their lands, the result of recent logging activities. The ranchers approach company manager Phipps (John Dilson) and camp foreman Bull Wilson (Stanley Blystone), urging them to plant new trees to prevent the dangerous runoff. Phipps and Wilson ignore the requests, and when confrontations with the ranchers turn violent, singing cowboy and rancher Gene Autry offers to appeal directly to the lumber company's president, Asa Wentworth (George Cleveland).

Gene and his sidekick Frog Millhouse (Smiley Burnette) meet with Asa, who tells them he recently turned control of the company over to his granddaughter Wilmetta "Billie" Wentworth (Maris Wrixon) and general manager Larry Drew (Robert Kent), and he is not happy with the way they've been running the business. Asa is also concerned about Billie's romantic interest in Larry, whom he does not trust. He asks Gene to meet with her at her country club and talk some sense into her.

At the country club, Frog has a difficult time adapting to the fancy surroundings. After Gene accidentally pushes Billie into a swimming pool, they are thrown out of the club. They return to Asa's house where the old man decides to throw a party and introduce Gene to Billie's influential friends. Later he sends out the invitations under Billie's name. At the party, Asa tells Gene to impress animal lover Susannah Hawkins Peabody (Sarah Edwards), whose husband Cornelius (Dick Elliott) is the state lieutenant governor. Hoping to preserve Mount Warner by having it declared a state park, Gene tells Susannah that the mountain is a haven for wild animals. As Gene and Susannah make arrangements for her to inspect the area, two of Billie's other friends grow suspicious of her absence and telephone her at a nightclub. Thinking that Gene and Frog have arranged the party on their own, and unaware of her grandfather's involvement, Billie has them arrested.

The next day, Asa arrives at the jail, bails them out, and returns with them to the valley to organize a campaign to create a state park at Mount Warner. Despite the violent opposition of Bull and his men, Gene is able to convince a state committee to inspect the area, which has now been stocked with wild animals by Frog. When Frog leads out a lion and a panther, however, Susannah realizes that she has been tricked, and she, Cornelius, Billie, and Larry prepare to leave in anger. As a huge rainstorm approaches, Gene warns them that the roads will be washed out, but they ignore him. While the desperate citizens of the valley are being flooded out of their homes, Gene and Frog chase after Asa's car, which they find stuck on a bridge. After getting everyone out of the car, Asa is swept into the river and saved by Gene.

Back at Gene's house, Billie sees all of the displaced ranchers and realizes that Gene has been telling the truth about their hardship. She also realizes that Larry was only interested in exploiting the area. In an effort to correct her past mistakes, Billie fires Larry, asks Asa to take back control of the company, and supports the state park legislation. Sometime later, on the day the park is dedicated, Asa and Frog watch with satisfaction as Gene and Billie walk off together to a new life.

== Cast ==
- Gene Autry as Gene Autry
- Smiley Burnette as Frog Millhouse
- George Cleveland as Asa Wentworth
- Maris Wrixon as Wilmetta "Billie" Wentworth
- Robert Kent as Larry Drew
- Sarah Edwards as Susanna Hawkins Peabody
- Monte Blue as Jim Hayes
- Dick Elliott as Lieutenant Governor Cornelius Peabody
- John Dilson as Phipps
- Stanley Blystone as Bull Wilson
- Champion as Gene's Horse (uncredited)

== Production ==
=== Casting ===
Sunset in Wyoming was Maris Wrixon's only Gene Autry film. Born December 28, 1916, Wrixon appeared in over fifty films between 1939 and 1951. Between 1940 and 1942, she appeared in 29 films at Warner Brothers, mostly uncredited parts and supporting roles. In the 1950s and 1960s, she appeared on several television series. She is best remembered for her role in the horror film, The Ape, starring Boris Karloff. In 1997, she remembered her experience working on Sunset in Wyoming:

Gene was very professional and wonderful to work with. I remember Gene kissed me on screen, which is something he didn't do very often with his leading ladies. There's a scene in Sunset in Wyoming where I'm pushed into a swimming pool. I took the fall in one take—thank goodness!

Wrixon was married to film editor Rudi Fehr. She died in Santa Monica, California of heart failure in 1999.

=== Filming and budget ===
Sunset in Wyoming was filmed May 27 to June 11, 1941. The film had an operating budget of $78,803 (equal to $1,724,930 today), and a negative cost of $84,097.

=== Filming locations ===
- Big Bear Lake, San Bernardino Mountains, California, USA
- George Lewis Mansion, Beverly Hills, California, USA
- Placerita Canyon, San Gabriel Mountains, California, USA

=== Stuntwork ===
- Yakima Canutt
- Tommy Coats
- Ken Cooper
- Joe Garcia
- Nellie Walker
- Bob Woodward
- Joe Yrigoyen (Gene Autry's stunt double)

=== Soundtrack ===
- "I Was Born in Ole Wyomin'" (Carson Robison) by Gene Autry and Smiley Burnette
- "There's a Home in Wyomin'" (Billy Hill, Peter De Rose) by Gene Autry
- "Twenty-One Years" (Bob Miller) by Gene Autry
- "Casey Jones" (T. Lawrence Seibert, Eddie Newton) by Gene Autry and Smiley Burnette
- "Sing Me a Song of the Saddle" (Frank Harford, Gene Autry) by Gene Autry
