= Hands Across the Border (1944 film) =

1944 film by Joseph Kane

- Theatrical release poster
- Directed by: Joseph Kane
- Written by: J. Benton Cheney (original screenplay); Bradford Ropes (original screenplay)
- Produced by: Harry Grey (associate producer)
- Starring: See below
- Cinematography: Reggie Lanning
- Edited by: Tony Martinelli
- Music by: Mort Glickman; Marlin Skiles
- Distributed by: Republic Pictures
- Release date: January 5, 1944
- Running time: 72 minutes (original version); 54 minutes (edited version)
- Country: United States
- Language: English

Hands Across the Border is a 1944 American Western film directed by Joseph Kane and starring Roy Rogers.

== Cast ==
- Roy Rogers as Roy Rogers
- Trigger as Trigger, Adams' horse
- Ruth Terry as Kim Adams
- Guinn "Big Boy" Williams as Teddy Bear
- Onslow Stevens as Brock Danvers
- Mary Treen as Sophie Lawrence
- Joseph Crehan as Jeff "Bet-a-Hundred" Adams
- Duncan Renaldo as Juan Morales
- LeRoy Mason as Sheriff
- Janet Martin as Rosita Morales
- Harry Wiere as Harry
- Herbert Wiere as Herby
- Sylvester Wiere as Sylvester
- Bob Nolan as Bob
- Sons of the Pioneers as Musicians
- Caren Marsh Doll as Dancer (uncredited)

== Soundtrack ==
- "Hands Across the Border" (Music by Hoagy Carmichael, lyrics by Ned Washington)
- "Dreaming to Music" (Music by Phil Ohman, lyrics by Ned Washington)
- "The Girl with the High Button Shoes" (Music by Phil Ohman, lyrics by Ned Washington)
- "When Your Heart's on Easy Street" (Music by Phil Ohman, lyrics by Ned Washington)
- "Hey, Hey (It's A Great Day)" (Music by Phil Ohman, lyrics by Ned Washington)
- "Ay, Jalisco, no te rajes!" (Music by Manuel Esperón, lyrics by Ernesto Cortázar)
