= Wild Harvest =

1947 film by Tay Garnett

- Directed by: Tay Garnett
- Screenplay by: John Monks, Jr.
- Story by: Houston Branch
- Produced by: Robert Fellows
- Starring: Alan Ladd; Dorothy Lamour; Robert Preston; Lloyd Nolan
- Cinematography: John F. Seitz
- Edited by: Billy Shea; George Tomasini
- Music by: Hugo Friedhofer
- Production company: Paramount Pictures
- Distributed by: Paramount Pictures
- Release date: September 26, 1947
- Running time: 92 minutes
- Country: United States
- Language: English
- Box office: $2,550,000 (US rentals)

Wild Harvest is a 1947 American drama film directed by Tay Garnett and starring Alan Ladd, Dorothy Lamour and Robert Preston. It was produced and distributed by Paramount Pictures.

== Plot ==
Joe Madigan's crew harvests wheat for farmers. Jim Davis, a good mechanic who irresponsibly drinks and gambles too much, is fired by his friend, but atones with a heroic act during a fire.

Alperson's rival crew is getting jobs by under-bidding Joe's. A farmer's flirtatious niece, Fay Rankin, finds a field for Joe's workers and then unsuccessfully tries to seduce him. She wants to come along and sets her sights on Jim instead, marrying him.

Fay's interference becomes a problem. Joe ends up owing money and Alperson tries to buy his combines. Fay makes another play for Joe, who calls her "cheap" and "poisonous." Jim catches her slapping Joe, which leads to a fight between the men.

Joe's loyal crew member King catches thievery of wheat by Jim and reports it. Joe, almost broke, is saved again by a penitent Jim, who sells Fay's car, enraging her. Fay finally reveals to Jim that she never loved him at all and that their marriage was a "joke." Joe and Jim team up on a new 3,000-acre job, making them prosperous at last.

== Cast ==
- Alan Ladd as Joe Madigan
- Dorothy Lamour as Fay Rankin
- Robert Preston as Jim Davis
- Lloyd Nolan as Kink
- Richard Erdman as Mark Lewis
- Allen Jenkins as Higgins
- Will Wright as Mike Alperson
- Griff Barnett as Rankin
- Anthony Caruso as Pete
- Walter Sande as Long
- Frank Sully as Nick
- Caren Marsh Doll as Natalie

== Production ==
The film was based on an original screen story called The Big Haircut by Houston Branch, which focused on wheat harvesters who travel across the country doing their job. "The big haircut" was their slang term for the work they do; the topic was thought to be especially topical because of a worldwide bread shortage at the time. It was bought by Paramount in May 1946 specifically as a vehicle for Alan Ladd. A. I. Bezzerides was hired to work on the script. Tay Garnett signed to direct and Brian Donlevy was originally announced as Ladd's co star. Before a final script and cast had been confirmed, second unit filming commenced in July 1946 at the Russell Giffen ranch, 47 miles north of Fresno in the San Joaquin Valley. Tay Garnett and the film crew shot footage of a real wheat harvest involving 27 combines and Alan Ladd. Female lead Dorothy Lamour was not cast until August. William Demarest also joined in the cast. Eventually Donlevy was replaced by Lloyd Nolan, who was borrowed from 20th Century Fox. Demarest dropped out and Robert Preston was cast as the third lead.

The cast included a 28-year-old Caren Marsh—a bit-part actor who had appeared in a Paramount training film warning military personnel against the dangers of women. So many navy and army men wrote in asking for Marsh's picture that Paramount signed her to a long-term contract; Wild Harvest was her first appearance.

Filming was meant to start on 2 September 1946 but was postponed a day so Alan Ladd could enjoy his birthday. Filming did not finish until November 1946, ten days behind schedule, causing production of Ladd's next film, Saigon, to be postponed.

The film was retitled Wild Harvest in December.

The wheat field fire was filmed in part by using miniatures and special effects. These were overseen by Byron Haskin, his last assignment in that capacity for Paramount before he became a director.
