= Youth on Parade =

1942 film by Albert S. Rogell

- Directed by: Albert S. Rogell
- Screenplay by: George Carleton Brown
- Produced by: Albert J. Cohen
- Starring: John Hubbard; Ruth Terry; Martha O'Driscoll; Tom Brown; Charles Smith
- Cinematography: Ernest Miller
- Edited by: Howard O'Neill
- Production company: Republic Pictures
- Distributed by: Republic Pictures
- Release date: October 24, 1942
- Running time: 72 minutes
- Country: United States
- Language: English

Youth on Parade is a 1942 comedy musical film directed by Albert S. Rogell and starring John Hubbard, Ruth Terry, Martha O'Driscoll, Tom Brown, and Charles Smith.

== Plot ==
As a joke, a group of college students plan to create the "perfect student". Unfortunately, their psychology professor finds out and is determined to meet her.

== Cast ==
- John Hubbard as Prof. Gerald Payne
- Martha O'Driscoll as Sally Carlyle
- Ruth Terry as Patty Flynn / Betty Reilly
- Tom Brown as Bingo Brown
- Charles Smith as Willie Webster
- Nana Bryant as Agatha Frost
- Ivan F. Simpson as Dean Wharton
- Chick Chandler as Eddie Reilly
- Lynn Merrick as Emmy Lou Pipes
- Paul Fix as Nick Cramer

== Accolades ==
"I've Heard That Song Before" was nominated for the AFI's 100 Years...100 Songs 2004 list.
