= Marshal of Gunsmoke =

1944 film by Vernon Keays

- Theatrical release poster
- Directed by: Vernon Keays
- Screenplay by: William Lively
- Produced by: Oliver Drake
- Starring: Tex Ritter; Russell Hayden; Fuzzy Knight; Jennifer Holt; Harry Woods; Herbert Rawlinson
- Cinematography: Harry Neumann
- Edited by: Alvin Todd
- Production company: Universal Pictures
- Distributed by: Universal Pictures
- Release date: January 22, 1944
- Running time: 58 minutes
- Country: United States
- Language: English

Marshal of Gunsmoke is a 1944 American Western film directed by Vernon Keays and written by William Lively. The film stars Tex Ritter, Russell Hayden, Fuzzy Knight, Jennifer Holt, Harry Woods and Herbert Rawlinson. The film was released on January 22, 1944, by Universal Pictures.

== Cast ==
- Tex Ritter as Ward Bailey
- Russell Hayden as Tom Bailey
- Fuzzy Knight as Glowworm Johnson
- Jennifer Holt as Ellen Carey
- Harry Woods as Lon Curtiss
- Herbert Rawlinson as Sam Garret
- Ethan Laidlaw as Pete Larkin
- Ray Bennett as Percival Turkel 'Spike' Cassidy
- Michael Vallon as Ezra Peters
- Ernie Adams as Nuggett Newcomb
- Slim Whitaker as Nevada
- Johnny Bond as Johnny Bond
