= Pistol Packin' Mama (film) =

1943 film by Frank Woodruff

- Theatrical release poster
- Directed by: Frank Woodruff
- Screenplay by: Edward Dein; Fred Schiller
- Story by: Arthur Caesar; Edward Dein
- Produced by: Edward J. White
- Starring: Ruth Terry; Robert Livingston; Wally Vernon; Jack La Rue; Kirk Alyn; Eddie Parker
- Cinematography: Reggie Lanning
- Edited by: Tony Martinelli
- Music by: Joseph Dubin; Marlin Skiles
- Production company: Republic Pictures
- Distributed by: Republic Pictures
- Release date: December 15, 1943
- Running time: 64 minutes
- Country: United States
- Language: English

Pistol Packin' Mama is a 1943 American comedy film directed by Frank Woodruff and written by Edward Dein and Fred Schiller. The film stars Ruth Terry, Robert Livingston, Wally Vernon, Jack La Rue, Kirk Alyn and Eddie Parker. The film was released on December 15, 1943, by Republic Pictures.

== Plot ==
Westerner Sally Benson is cheated out of her bankroll by Nick Winner, a gambler passing through town. In New York, Nick opens up a combination night club/gambling joint and, while he is away, Sally, using the name of Vicki Norris, gets a job singing at the club. He attempts to fire her when he returns but she coolly pulls a gun and forces him to cut cards for the club he opened using her money. This time, using marked cards herself, she wins but keeps Nick on as the manager. She becomes engaged to rich, stuffy blueblood, J. Leslie Benton III, until Nick, who has fallen in love with her, wins her away. They plan to marry until Vicki gets the mistaken idea that Nick's real interest is in getting his club back. This complication is coupled with a war waged against the club by Nick's old gambling rival Johnny Rossi.

== Cast ==
- Ruth Terry as Vicki Norris / Sally Benson
- Robert Livingston as Nick Winner
- Wally Vernon as The Joker
- Jack La Rue as Johnny Rossi
- Kirk Alyn as J. Leslie Burton III
- Eddie Parker as Mike
- Joe Kirk as Joe McGurn
- Helen Talbot as Young Wife
- Lydia Bilbrook as Mrs. Burton
- George Lessey as Mr. Burton
- The King Cole Trio as The King Cole Trio

== Reception ==
The TV Guide review says it is "not as much fun as its title suggests".
