= My Buddy (film) =

1944 film by Steve Sekely

- Theatrical release poster
- Directed by: Steve Sekely
- Screenplay by: Arnold Manoff
- Story by: Prescott Chaplin
- Produced by: Edward J. White
- Starring: Don "Red" Barry; Ruth Terry; Lynne Roberts; Alexander Granach; Emma Dunn; John Litel
- Cinematography: Reggie Lanning
- Edited by: Tony Martinelli
- Music by: R. Dale Butts
- Production company: Republic Pictures
- Distributed by: Republic Pictures
- Release date: October 12, 1944
- Running time: 67 minutes
- Country: United States
- Language: English

My Buddy is a 1944 American crime film directed by Steve Sekely and written by Arnold Manoff. The film stars Don "Red" Barry, Ruth Terry, Lynne Roberts, Alexander Granach, Emma Dunn and John Litel. The film was released on October 12, 1944, by Republic Pictures.

== Cast ==
- Don "Red" Barry as Eddie Ballinger
- Ruth Terry as Lola
- Lynne Roberts as Lucy Manners
- Alexander Granach as Tim Oberta
- Emma Dunn as Mary Ballinger
- John Litel as Father Jim Donnelly
- George E. Stone as Pete
- Jonathan Hale as Senator Henry
- Ray Walker as Russ
- Joe Devlin as Nicky Piastro
- Matt McHugh as Happy
