= Blazing the Western Trail =

1945 film by Vernon Keays

- Theatrical release poster
- Directed by: Vernon Keays
- Screenplay by: J. Benton Cheney
- Produced by: Colbert Clark
- Starring: Charles Starrett; Tex Harding; Dub Taylor; Carole Mathews; Bob Wills
- Cinematography: George Meehan
- Edited by: Henry Batista
- Production company: Columbia Pictures
- Distributed by: Columbia Pictures
- Release date: September 18, 1945
- Running time: 60 minutes
- Country: United States
- Language: English

Blazing the Western Trail is a 1945 American Western film directed by Vernon Keays and written by J. Benton Cheney. The film stars Charles Starrett, Tex Harding, Dub Taylor, Carole Mathews and Bob Wills. The film was released on September 18, 1945, by Columbia Pictures. This was the sixth of 65 films in the Durango Kid series.

== Cast ==
- Charles Starrett as Jeff Waring / The Durango Kid
- Tex Harding as Tex Harding
- Dub Taylor as Cannonball
- Carole Mathews as Mary Halliday
- Bob Wills as Bob
- Alan Bridge as Forrest Brent
- Nolan Leary as Bob Halliday
- Virginia Sale as Nellie
- Steve Clark as Dan Waring
- Mauritz Hugo as Jim McMasters
- Ethan Laidlaw as Santry
- Edmund Cobb as Sheriff Turner
- Frank LaRue as Mr. Spencer
- Glenn Strange as Brent
- Edward Howard as McMasters
- James T. Nelson as Deputy
- Budd Buster as Salesman
- John Tyrrell as Clerk
- Robert B. Williams as Spencer
