= Secrets of a Sorority Girl =

1946 film by Lew Landers and Frank Wisbar

- Theatrical release poster
- Directed by: Lew Landers; Frank Wisbar
- Screenplay by: George Wallace Sayre; Arthur St. Claire
- Story by: George Wallace Sayre
- Produced by: Max Alexander; Alfred Stern
- Starring: Mary Ware; Rick Vallin; Addison Richards; Ray Walker; Marie Harmon; Caren Marsh
- Cinematography: Robert E. Cline
- Edited by: Roy Livingston
- Production company: Producers Releasing Corporation
- Distributed by: Producers Releasing Corporation
- Release date: August 15, 1946
- Running time: 58 minutes
- Country: United States
- Language: English

Secrets of a Sorority Girl is a 1946 American crime film directed by Lew Landers and Frank Wisbar and written by George Wallace Sayre and Arthur St. Claire. The film stars Mary Ware, Rick Vallin, Addison Richards, Ray Walker, Marie Harmon and Caren Marsh. The film was released on August 15, 1945, by Producers Releasing Corporation.

== Plot ==
A district attorney is blackmailed after a photograh of his daughter, a sorority member, is taken with criminals in illegal gambling dens.

== Cast ==
- Mary Ware as Linda Hamilton
- Rick Vallin as Paul Reynolds
- Addison Richards as John Hamilton
- Ray Walker as Whitey King
- Marie Harmon as Judy O'Neill
- Caren Marsh Doll as Audrey Scott
- Mary Kenyon as Barbara Chase
- Marilyn Johnson as Jeannie Cooper
- Rosemonde James as Carol Miller
- Mauritz Hugo as Charles Stevens
- Emmett Vogan as Joseph Kelland
- Frank Ferguson as Justin Farley
- Anthony Warde as Nick Vegas
- William Murphy as Andy Jones
- Pierre Watkin as Dr. Harlan Johnson
- Bobo Scharfe as Gangster
