= The Utah Kid (1944 film) =

1944 film

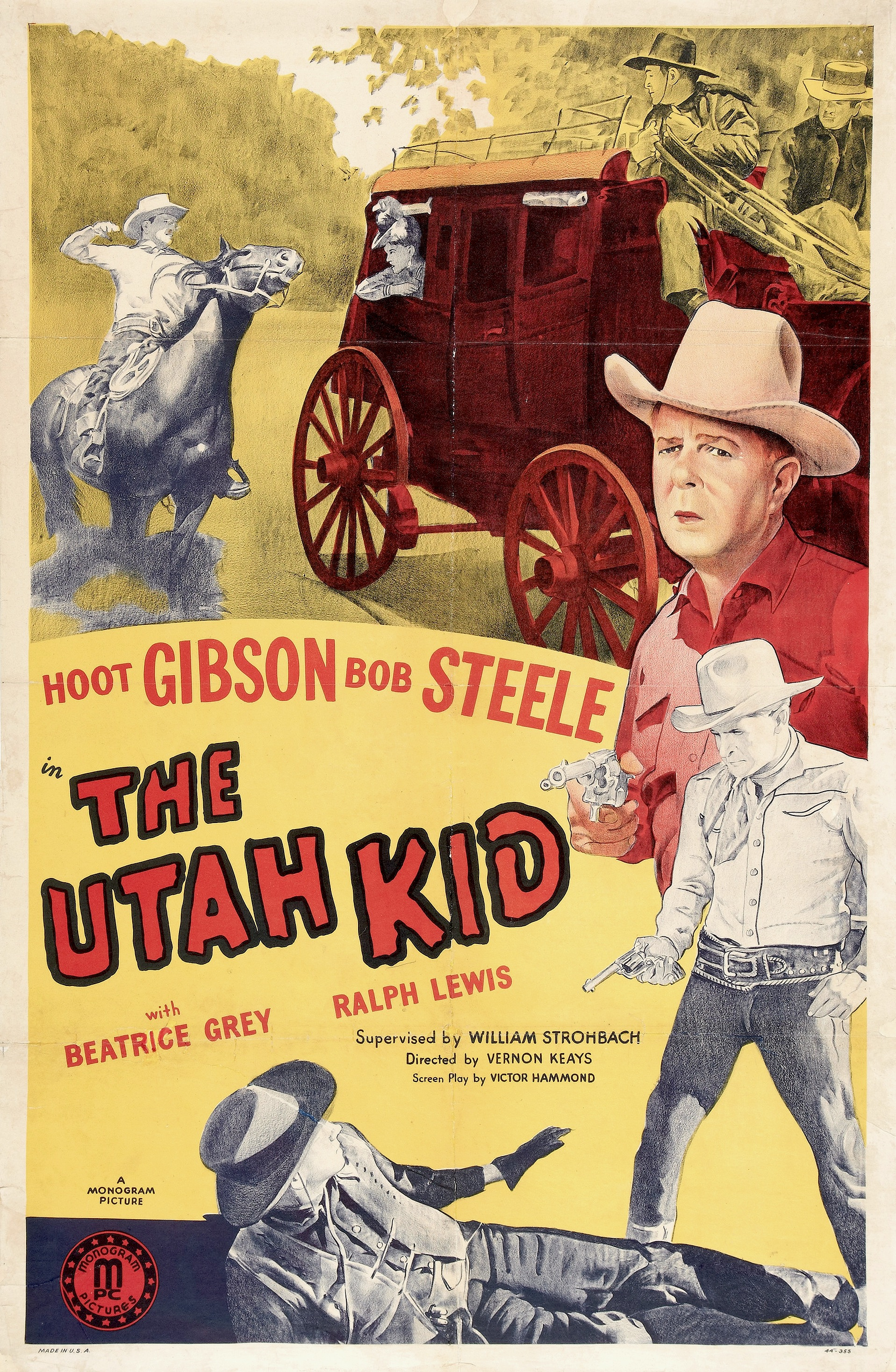
- Directed by: Vernon Keays
- Written by: Lindsley Parsons
- Screenplay by: Victor Hammond
- Produced by: William Strohbach (supervising producer)
- Starring: Hoot Gibson; Bob Steele
- Cinematography: Harry Neumann
- Edited by: Ray Curtiss; John C. Fuller
- Distributed by: Monogram Pictures
- Release date: 26 August 1944
- Running time: 53 minutes
- Country: United States
- Language: English

The Utah Kid is a 1944 American Western film directed by Vernon Keays and starring Hoot Gibson and Bob Steele. It was made and distributed by the Poverty Row studio Monogram Pictures.

== Cast ==
- Hoot Gibson as Marshal Hoot Higgins
- Bob Steele as Bob Roberts
- Beatrice Gray as Marjorie Carter
- Ralph Lewis as Cheyenne Kent
- Evelyn Eaton as Dolores
- Mauritz Hugo as Barton
- George Morrell as Sheriff
- Dan White as Henchman Slim
- Mike Letz as Henchman Blackie
- Jameson Shade as Judge Carter
- Lynton Brent as Tells Bob He's Next (uncredited)
- Jack Evans as Barfly (uncredited)
- Al Ferguson as Bartender (uncredited)
- Herman Hack as Henchman (uncredited)
- Earle Hodgins as Rodeo Announcer (uncredited)
- Lew Meehan as Bandit (uncredited)
- Lew Morphy as Deputy (uncredited)
- Fox O'Callahan as Deputy (uncredited)
- Bud Osborne as Stage Driver Jim (uncredited)
