= Marie Harmon =

American actress (1923–2021)

- Born: October 21, 1923; Oak Park, Illinois, U.S.
- Died: January 25, 2021 (aged 97); Los Angeles, California, U.S.
- Occupation: Actress
- Years active: 1943–1958
- Spouses: William G. Jones (divorced); Donald Currie (m. 1951; div. 1972) Wolfgang Kaupisch (m. 1975; died 2010)
- Children: 4, including Sondra Currie, Cherie Currie, and Marie Currie

Marie Harmon (October 21, 1923 – January 25, 2021) was an American actress and businesswoman, who worked as an actress primarily in the 1940s during the Golden Age of Hollywood. She is best known for her lead role in the 1946 American Western film The El Paso Kid, opposite Sunset Carson.

== Early life and career ==
Harmon was born on October 21, 1923, in Chicago. She had five siblings, all brothers. As a child, she performed in local theater productions. At age 18, she moved to Hollywood to pursue a professional career in acting. Her acting debut was an uncredited role in the 1943 film Hers to Hold, starring Deanna Durbin and Joseph Cotten.

As a student at Oak Park High School, Harmon was a member of the Stevenson Players drama group.

== Personal life ==
In the 1950s, Harmon quit show business to open up a women's clothing store.

She was married three times. Her first husband was William G. Jones, a used car dealer. Their only child is actress Sondra Currie. They were divorced on June 18, 1948. She married Donald Currie in 1951. The couple had three children; twin daughters Cherie Currie (former lead vocalist of The Runaways), and Marie Currie, and a son Don Anthony Currie. She was the mother-in-law of Alan J. Levi, and formerly of Steven Lukather (guitarist of Toto) and Robert Hays. Harmon got divorced in 1972. Three years later, she married Wolfgang Kaupisch, a German Iron Cross recipient, and Veteran of the Luftwaffe, who died in on June 9, 2010, at the age of 95. She died in Los Angeles on January 25, 2021, of natural causes at the age of 97.

Despite her surname, Harmon was not related to the popular actor Mark Harmon, nor to his family, the Harmon–Nelson family (a well-known California show business family).

== Filmography ==
Year	Title	Role	Notes
1943	Hers to Hold	Ella Mae	Uncredited
1943	Hi'ya, Sailor	Deadpan's hostess	Uncredited
1944	Ladies Courageous	Genevieve	Uncredited
1944	Hat Check Honey	Hat check girl	Uncredited
1944	Hi, Good Lookin'!	Waitress	Uncredited
1944	South of Dixie	Annabella Hatcher	Uncredited
1944	Allergic to Love	Miss Higgenbothan	Uncredited
1944	Reckless Age	Salesgirl O'Toole	Uncredited
1945	Her Lucky Night	Susie	
1945	See My Lawyer	Singer	Uncredited
1945	Springtime in Texas	Kitty Stevens	
1945	Secrets of a Sorority Girl	Judy O'Neill	
1945	Allotment Wives	Girl	Uncredited
1945	Black Market Babies	Receptionist	Uncredited
1945	The Sailor Takes a Wife	WAC	Uncredited
1946	Girl on the Spot	Girl	Uncredited
1946	The El Paso Kid	Sally Stoner	
1946	Behind the Mask	Minor Role	Uncredited
1946	She Wrote the Book	Blonde	Uncredited
1947	Gunsmoke	Conchita	
1947	Secret Beyond the Door	Sub-Deb	Uncredited
1947	Killer McCoy	Gwen Brady	Uncredited
1948	If You Knew Susie	Secretary	Uncredited
1948	The Checkered Coat	Minor Role	Uncredited
1948	Night Time in Nevada	Toni Borden	
1948	Jiggs and Maggie in Court	Alice	Uncredited
1949	Not Wanted	Irene	
1958	I Married a Woman	Bridesmaid	Uncredited
