= Sing Me a Song of Texas =

1945 film by Vernon Keays

- Theatrical release poster
- Directed by: Vernon Keays
- Screenplay by: J. Benton Cheney; Elizabeth Beecher
- Produced by: Colbert Clark
- Starring: Rosemary Lane; Tom Tyler; Guinn "Big Boy" Williams; Slim Summerville; Carole Mathews; Noah Beery Sr. Pinky Tomlin; Marie Austin
- Cinematography: George Meehan
- Edited by: Aaron Stell
- Production company: Columbia Pictures
- Distributed by: Columbia Pictures
- Release date: February 8, 1945
- Running time: 66 minutes
- Country: United States
- Language: English

Sing Me a Song of Texas is a 1945 American Western film directed by Vernon Keays and written by J. Benton Cheney and Elizabeth Beecher. The film stars Rosemary Lane, Tom Tyler, Guinn "Big Boy" Williams, Slim Summerville, Carole Mathews, Noah Beery Sr., Pinky Tomlin and Marie Austin. The film was released on February 8, 1945, by Columbia Pictures. The film features Noah Beery Sr.'s final role in a motion picture.

== Cast ==
- Rosemary Lane as Laurie Lang
- Tom Tyler as Steve Andrews
- Guinn "Big Boy" Williams as Big Boy
- Slim Summerville as Happy
- Carole Mathews as Hilda Cartwright
- Noah Beery Sr. as Charley Bronson
- Pinky Tomlin as himself
- Marie Austin as Trudy Hobbs
- Ken Trietsch as Hoosier Hot Shot Ken
- Paul Trietsch as Hoosier Hot Shot Hessie
- Charles Ward as Hoosier Hot Shot Gabe
- Gil Taylor as Hoosier Hot Shot Gil
- Hal McIntyre as Orchestra Leader
- Foy Willing as Guitar Player Jim
