= Vernon Keays =

American film director

- Born: February 27, 1900; Ypsilanti, Michigan, United States
- Died: May 22, 1964 (aged 64); Los Angeles, California, United States
- Occupations: Director, producer
- Years active: 1921–1964 (film)

Vernon Keays (February 27, 1900 – May 22, 1964) was an American film director. He directed twenty films, a mixture of short films and features, and acted as assistant director or second unit director on roughly seventy productions including several television series. He also worked as a production manager and occasional producer.

== Selected filmography ==
- Strictly in the Groove (1942)
- Arizona Trail (1943)
- Trigger Law (1944)
- The Utah Kid (1944)
- Trail to Gunsight (1944)
- Marshal of Gunsmoke (1944)
- Rhythm Round-Up (1945)
- Sing Me a Song of Texas (1945)
- Rockin' in the Rockies (1945)
- Lawless Empire (1945)
- Blazing the Western Trail (1945)
- Dangerous Intruder (1945)
- Landrush (1946)
- The Mysterious Mr. M (1946)
- Whirlwind Raiders (1948)
- Runaway Girl (1965)

== Bibliography ==
- Drew, Bernard A. Motion Picture Series and Sequels: A Reference Guide. Routledge, 2013.
- Pitts, Michael R. Poverty Row Studios, 1929–1940: An Illustrated History of 55 Independent Film Companies, with a Filmography for Each. McFarland & Company, 2005.
