= Maris Wrixon =

American actress

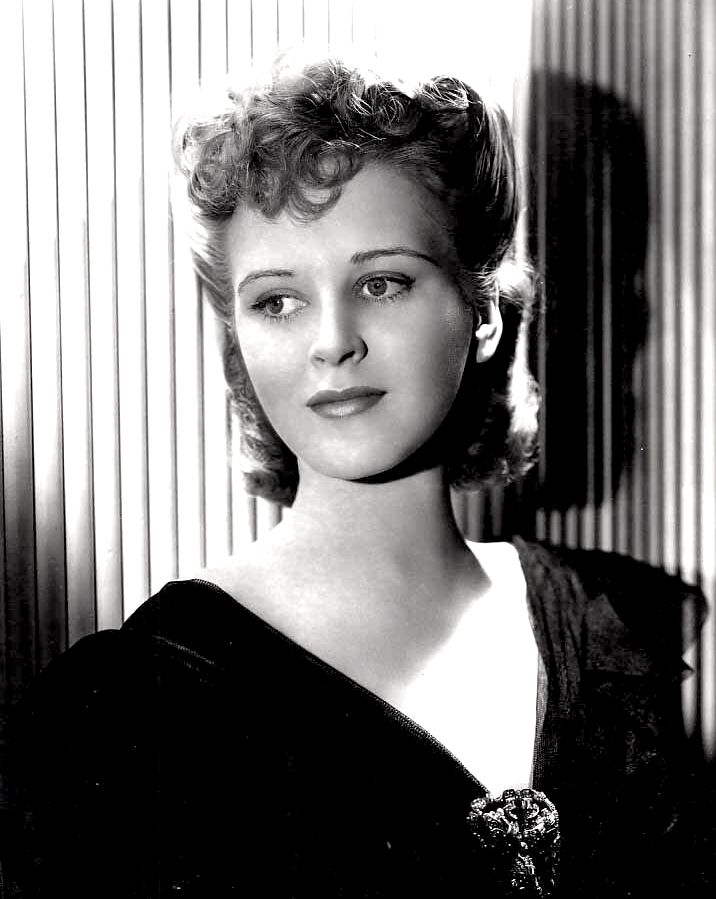
- Wrixon in 1938 by George Hurrell
- Born: Mary Alice Wrixon; December 28, 1917; Billings, Montana, U.S.
- Died: October 6, 1999 (aged 81); Santa Monica, California, U.S.
- Occupation: Actress
- Years active: 1939 – 1951
- Spouse: Rudi Fehr (m. 1940; died 1999)
- Children: 3

Mary Alice "Maris" Wrixon (December 28, 1917 – October 6, 1999) was an American film and television actress. She appeared in over 50 films between 1939 and 1951.

== Early years ==
Wrixon was born in Pasco, Washington, to Mr. and Mrs. W.H. Wrixon. One of three children, she was raised in Great Falls, Montana. Her interest in acting was sparked by a role she had in a class play when she was a student at Great Falls High School.

She gained acting experience at the Pasadena Community Playhouse.

== Career ==
Wrixon first appeared on screen in the late 1930s, making one picture in 1938 and 10 in 1939. Between 1940 and 1942, she appeared in 29 films at Warner Brothers, alternating between uncredited parts (as in High Sierra and Dark Victory) and supporting roles.

Wrixon worked primarily in B-movies and, in addition to her work at Warners, also appeared in films produced by Poverty Row studios. One such as Monogram release, The Ape, starring Boris Karloff, became the picture for which she was known best.{

Her final film was As You Were (1951).

== Personal life ==
Wrixon was married to Oscar-nominated film editor Rudi Fehr. She died in Santa Monica, California of heart failure at the age of 81 on October 6, 1999.

== Selected filmography ==
- Off the Record (1939) - Telephone Operator (uncredited)
- The Adventures of Jane Arden (1939) - Martha Blanton - Debutante
- No Place to Go (1939) - Mrs. Harriet Washburn (uncredited)
- The Private Lives of Elizabeth and Essex (1939) - Lady of the Court (uncredited)
- Jeepers Creepers (1939) - Connie Durant
- British Intelligence (1940) - Dorothy Bennett (uncredited)
- 'Til We Meet Again (1940) - Girl (uncredited)
- Saturday's Children (1940) - City Hospital Nurse (uncredited)
- Flight Angels (1940) - Bonnie
- The Man Who Talked Too Much (1940) - Roscoe's Secretary
- The Ape (1940) - Miss Frances Clifford
- Knute Rockne All American (1940) - Telephone Operator (uncredited)
- Lady with Red Hair (1940) - Miss Annie Ellis (uncredited)
- Santa Fe Trail (1940) - Girl at Wedding (uncredited)
- The Case of the Black Parrot (1941) - Sandy Vantine
- High Sierra (1941) - Blonde at Auto Accident (uncredited)
- Footsteps in the Dark (1941) - June Brewster
- Meet John Doe (1941) - Autograph Hound (uncredited)
- A Shot in the Dark (1941) - Helen Armstrong
- Million Dollar Baby (1941) - Diana Bennet
- Sunset in Wyoming (1941) - Wilmetta 'Billie' Wentworth
- Bullets for O'Hara (1941) - Elaine Standish
- Navy Blues (1941) - Hawaii Pickup #2 (uncredited)
- Spy Ship (1942) - Sue Mitchell
- Sons of the Pioneers (1942) - Louise Harper
- The Old Homestead (1942) - Mary Jo Weaver
- Silent Witness (1943) - Betty Higgins, Special Investigator
- Women in Bondage (1943) - Grete Ziegler
- Phantom Lady (1944) - Blonde (uncredited)
- Waterfront (1944) - Freda Hauser
- Trail to Gunsight (1944) - Mary Wagner
- The Master Key (1945, Serial) - Dorothy Newton
- White Pongo (1945) - Pamela Bragdon
- This Love of Ours (1945) - Evelyn
- Black Market Babies (1945) - Helen Roberts
- The Face of Marble (1946) - Linda Sinclair
- The Glass Alibi (1946) - Linda Vale
- The Saxon Charm (1948) - Mrs. McCarthy (uncredited)
- Highway 13 (1948) - Mary Hadley
- As You Were (1951)
- Sea Hunt (1960, TV Series) - Edith Judd
- The Graduate (1967) - Guest at Welcoming Party (uncredited)
- Dayton's Devils (1968) - Cashier (final film role)
