= Ruth Terry =

American actress and singer (1920–2016)

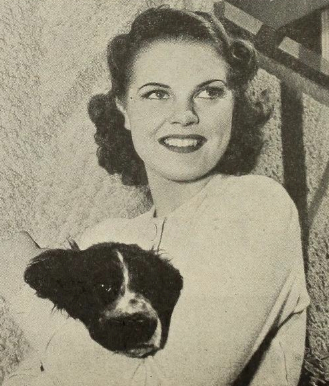
- Terry in 1940
- Born: Ruth Mae McMahon; October 21, 1920; Benton Harbor, Michigan, U.S.
- Died: March 11, 2016 (aged 95); Rancho Mirage, California, U.S.
- Resting place: Forest Lawn Cemetery, Cathedral City, California
- Occupations: Actress; singer
- Years active: 1937–1964
- Spouses: John Martin (m. 1942; div. 19??); John P. Gilmour (m. 1946; div. 19??); John Ledbetter (m. 1966)

Ruth Mae Terry (born Ruth Mae McMahon, October 21, 1920 – March 11, 2016) was an American singer and actress in film and television from the 1930s to the 1960s. She claimed her stage name came from Walter Winchell, who combined the names of two then-famous baseball players, Babe Ruth and Bill Terry.

== Early years ==
Terry was born in Benton Harbor, Michigan, the daughter of Irish-American parents, Mr. and Mrs. M. E. McMahon. She attended St John's Catholic School in Benton Harbor.

Terry won a number of prizes for singing before singing with the Paul Ash Theater Orchestra at the age of twelve. At that same age, she left her hometown to sing with Clyde McCoy's orchestra.

== Career ==
Terry's first movie was Love and Hisses in 1937 with Walter Winchell, at which time she was earning $400 per week. Her first western was Call of the Canyon with Gene Autry. She appeared in several Roy Rogers movies. Her best-known movie was Pistol Packin' Mama, based on the song of the same name with Robert Livingston. She retired when she married her second husband in 1947.

While making films, Terry continued her singing career in a limited way. On August 15, 1943, she appeared as guest female singer on The Bob Crosby Show on NBC radio.

== Personal life ==
On June 20, 1942, Terry and test pilot John Martin eloped and were married in Las Vegas, Nevada. On October 25, 1947, she married John P. Gilmour, a Canadian. A November 8, 1947, article in her hometown newspaper, The News-Palladium, reported, "She has given up her career as an actress and she and her husband and her four-year-old son by a previous marriage will make their home at St. Genevieve de Pierre Fonds, Quebec."

== Death ==
Terry died on March 11, 2016, at the age of 95. She was buried in Forest Lawn Cemetery (Cathedral City).

== Filmography ==
Year	Title	Role	Notes
1937	Love and Hisses	Hawaiian Specialty Singer	
1938	International Settlement	Vera Dale	
1938	Alexander's Ragtime Band	Ruby	20th Century Fox
1938	Hold That Co-ed	Edie	
1939	Wife, Husband and Friend	Carol	
1939	The Hound of the Baskervilles	Betsy Ann	Uncredited
1939	Hotel for Women	Craig's Receptionist	
1939	Slightly Honorable	Ann Seymour	United Artists
1940	An Angel from Texas	Valerie Blayne	
1940	Sing, Dance, Plenty Hot	Irene	
1941	Blondie Goes Latin	Lovey Nelson, the Singer	Columbia
1941	Rookies on Parade	Lois Rogers	
1941	Appointment for Love	Edith Meredith	
1942	Sleepytime Gal	Sugar Caston	Republic
1942	The Affairs of Jimmy Valentine	Bonnie Forbes	Republic
1942	Call of the Canyon	Katherine 'Kit' Carson	Republic
1942	Youth on Parade	Patty Flynn / Betty Reilly	Republic
1942	Heart of the Golden West	Mary Lou Popen	Republic
1943	The Man from Music Mountain	Laramie Winters	Republic
1943	Mystery Broadcast	Jan Cornell	Republic
1943	Pistol Packin' Mama	Vicki Norris / Sally Benson	Republic
1944	Hands Across the Border	Kim Adams	Republic
1944	Jamboree	Ruth Cartwright	
1944	Goodnight, Sweetheart	Caryl Martin	
1944	Three Little Sisters	Hallie Scott	
1944	Sing, Neighbor, Sing	Virginia Blake	
1944	My Buddy	Lola	
1944	Lake Placid Serenade	Susan Cermak	
1945	Steppin' in Society	Lola Forrest	
1945	The Cheaters	Therese Pidgeon	
1945	Tell It to a Star	Carol Lambert	Republic; Robert Livingston and Aurora Miranda
1947	Smoky River Serenade	Sue Greeley	Columbia
1962	Hand of Death	Woman with Packages	
1964	The New Interns	Carolyn's Mother	Uncredited, (final film role)
