= Tell It to a Star =

1945 film by Frank McDonald

- Theatrical release poster
- Directed by: Frank McDonald
- Screenplay by: John K. Butler
- Story by: Gerald Drayson Adams; John W. Krafft
- Produced by: Walter H. Goetz
- Starring: Ruth Terry; Robert Livingston; Alan Mowbray; Franklin Pangborn; Isabel Randolph; Eddie Marr
- Cinematography: Ernest Miller
- Edited by: Arthur Roberts
- Music by: Joseph Dubin
- Production company: Republic Pictures
- Distributed by: Republic Pictures
- Release date: August 16, 1945
- Running time: 67 minutes
- Country: United States
- Language: English

Tell It to a Star is a 1945 American musical film directed by Frank McDonald, written by John K. Butler, and starring Ruth Terry, Robert Livingston, Alan Mowbray, Franklin Pangborn, Isabel Randolph and Eddie Marr. It was released on August 16, 1945, by Republic Pictures.

== Plot ==
Carol Lambert is a cigarette girl in a posh Florida hotel. A note is delivered to the resort's bandleader, Gene Ritchie, requesting that Carol get a chance to sing. Gene already has a singer, Mona St. Clair, so the note causes resentment and Carol is fired.

Mrs. Whitmore, the hotel's owner, likes Carol and rehires her. Meantime, a con artist who calls himself "Colonel" Morgan turns up and, with partner Billy, begins scamming the hotel's guests. An embarrassed Carol tries to cover for him.

Morgan uses his charms to persuade Mrs. Whitmore to let Carol sing. She's a great success, but when an irate Mona reveals that Morgan's a con man who has even promised to deliver a new benefactor for the band, the musicians walk out. Carol arranges an all-female band for Gene and it's a hit. She and Gene hit it off, too.

== Cast ==
- Ruth Terry as Carol Lambert
- Robert Livingston as Gene Ritchie
- Alan Mowbray as Colonel Ambrose Morgan
- Franklin Pangborn as Horace Lovelace
- Isabel Randolph as Mrs. Arnold Whitmore
- Eddie Marr as Billy Sheehan
- Lorna Gray as Mona St. Clair
- Frank Orth as Augustus T. Goodman
- Tom Dugan as Ed Smith
- George Chandler as Al Marx
- Mary McCarty as Miss Dobson
- William B. Davidson as Brannigan
- Aurora Miranda as Specialty Act
