= Navajo Kid =

1945 film by Harry L. Fraser

- Directed by: Harry L. Fraser
- Written by: Harry L. Fraser
- Produced by: Arthur Alexander
- Cinematography: Jack Greenhalgh
- Edited by: Roy V. Livingston
- Production company: Alexander-Stern Productions
- Distributed by: Producers Releasing Corporation
- Release date: November 21, 1945
- Running time: 59 minutes
- Country: United States
- Language: English

Navajo Kid is a 1945 American Western film directed by Harry L. Fraser for Alexander-Stern Productions and starring Bob Steele as the titular character, Syd Salor and Ed Cassidy. It was distributed by Producers Releasing Corporation (PRC) and commercially released in the United States on 21 November 1945. It was filmed in Corriganville, Ray Corrigan Ranch, Simi Valley, California, United States.

== Plot ==
Tom Kirk, the "Navajo Kid", (Bob Steele) is determined to find his adoptive father's (George Morrel) murderer. When he finds Honest John Grogan (I. Stanford Jolly) with his father's ring, he immediately arrests him. While Honest John was indeed part of the gang which killed Joe Kirk, the gang-leader was Matt Crandall (Stanley Blystone). As Tom begins hunting for Matt, he soon discovers who his true biological father is.

== Cast ==
- Bob Steele as Tom Kirk a.k.a. The Navajo Kid
- Syd Saylor as Happy
- Ed Cassidy as Sheriff Roy Landon
- Caren Marsh as Winnie McMasters
- Stanley Blystone as Matt Crandall
