= Springtime in Texas =

1945 film directed by Oliver Drake

- Theatrical release poster
- Directed by: Oliver Drake
- Screenplay by: Frances Kavanaugh
- Produced by: Lindsley Parsons
- Starring: Jimmy Wakely; Dennis Moore; Lee "Lasses" White; Marie Harmon; Rex Lease; Pearl Early
- Cinematography: William A. Sickner
- Edited by: William Austin
- Music by: Frank Sanucci
- Production company: Monogram Pictures
- Distributed by: Monogram Pictures
- Release date: June 2, 1945
- Running time: 55 minutes
- Country: United States
- Language: English

Springtime in Texas is a 1945 American Western film directed by Oliver Drake and written by Frances Kavanaugh. The film stars Jimmy Wakely, Dennis Moore, Lee "Lasses" White, Marie Harmon, Rex Lease and Pearl Early. The film was released on June 2, 1945, by Monogram Pictures.

== Cast ==
- Jimmy Wakely as Jimmy Wakely
- Dennis Moore as Denny Moore
- Lee "Lasses" White as Lasses White
- Marie Harmon as Kitty Stevens
- Rex Lease as Pete Grant
- Pearl Early as Prunella Bumstead
- Horace Murphy as Mayor Lem Grainger
- I. Stanford Jolley as Marshal Set Rawlins
- Wally Wales as Red Higgins
- Budd Buster as Jed Stevens
- Roy Butler as Sam Monroe
- Johnny Bond as Johnny Bond
- Frankie Marvin as Frankie Marvin
