= Dangerous Intruder =

1945 American film noir

- Theatrical release poster
- Directed by: Vernon Keays
- Written by: Martin Goldsmith
- Story by: F. Ruth Howard; Philip MacDonald
- Produced by: Leon Fromkess; Martin Mooney
- Starring: Charles Arnt; Veda Ann Borg; Richard Powers
- Cinematography: James S. Brown Jr.
- Edited by: Carl Pierson
- Music by: Karl Hajos
- Distributed by: Producers Releasing Corporation
- Release date: September 21, 1945 (United States)
- Running time: 65 minutes
- Country: United States
- Language: English

Dangerous Intruder is a 1945 American film noir directed by Vernon Keays, starring Charles Arnt, Veda Ann Borg and Richard Powers .

== Plot ==
New-York-bound hitchhiker Jenny (Borg) is accidentally struck by a car. The driver, art dealer Max Ducane (Arnt), offers to take her into his home until she can resume traveling. Later, Ducane's wife is murdered and Jenny determines to find the killer. With the aid of detective Curtis (Powers), she discovers that Ducane is the murderer, having killed his wife in order to have the funds to finance his antique collection. When she tries to get away the murderer is killed in a car crash when trying to run her down.

== Cast ==
- Charles Arnt as Max Ducane
- Veda Ann Borg as Jenny
- Richard Powers as Curtis
- Fay Helm as Millicent Ducane
- John Rogers as Foster
- Jo Ann Marlowe as Jackie
- Helena Phillips Evans as Mrs. Swenson
