= Caren Marsh Doll =

American dancer and actress (born 1919)

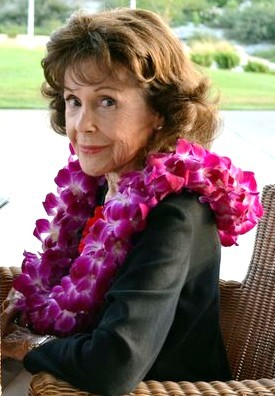
- Marsh on her 93rd birthday in 2012
- Born: Aileen Betty Morris; April 6, 1919 (age 107); Los Angeles, California, U.S.
- Occupations: Actress; dancer
- Years active: 1937–1948 (actress); 1956–present (dance instructor)
- Known for: Being one of the stand-ins for Judy Garland on The Wizard of Oz; Ziegfeld Girl
- Notable work: Gone With the Wind
- Spouses: Lewis Isaacs Edwards (m. 1939, unknown) Bill Doll (m. 1950; died 1979)
- Children: 1
- Relatives: Dorothy Morris (sister)

Caren Marsh Doll (born Aileen Betty Morris; April 6, 1919), also credited as Caren Marsh, is an American former stage and screen actress and dancer specializing in modern dance and tap. She is notable as one of Judy Garland's stand-ins in The Wizard of Oz (1939) and Ziegfeld Girl (1941). She is one of the last surviving actors from the Golden Age of Hollywood. From 1937 until 1948, Marsh appeared in motion pictures with Metro-Goldwyn-Mayer, including a small uncredited part in Gone with the Wind. She became a dance instructor in 1956.

== Early life ==
Aileen Betty Morris was born in Los Angeles, California on April 6, 1919. Her father was a Hollywood stockbroker. She and her family were active in the Methodist church. In 1937, she graduated from Hollywood High School and wanted to become an actress despite her parents wanting her to focus on studies first.

== Film career ==
Marsh auditioned for a role in Rosalie (1937), starring Nelson Eddy and Eleanor Powell, but did not win the role. She later re-auditioned for the film in a new outfit, hoping nobody would remember her from the first time, and got the part. She was hired as Judy Garland's stand-in for The Wizard of Oz. She was hired primarily because she was similar in height and build to Garland and even received her own pair of ruby slippers. In fact, hers are the feet seen in the film when Dorothy Gale taps the heels of the slippers together. She served as a stand-in for Garland a second time with Ziegfeld Girl (1941).

In film, credited under the name Caren Marsh, she appeared in films such as That Night in Rio (1941), Hands Across the Border (1944), Wild Harvest (1947), Girl Crazy (1943), Best Foot Forward (1943), Seven Sweethearts (1942), and Night and Day (1946). She did appear in speaking parts in films as Secrets of a Sorority Girl (1945) and Navajo Kid (1945).

In 1947, Marsh was named Miss Sky Lady of 1947 and began appearing in fewer films to focus on her new interest in dance. After appearing in an airshow as Miss Sky Lady, she took flight instruction classes, learned to fly and later dropped leaflets of her acting profile on various movie studios in Hollywood. On March 6, 1949, Marsh, along with singers Delora Bueno and Louise Howard, appeared on the Ted Steele Show.

== 1949 plane crash survival ==
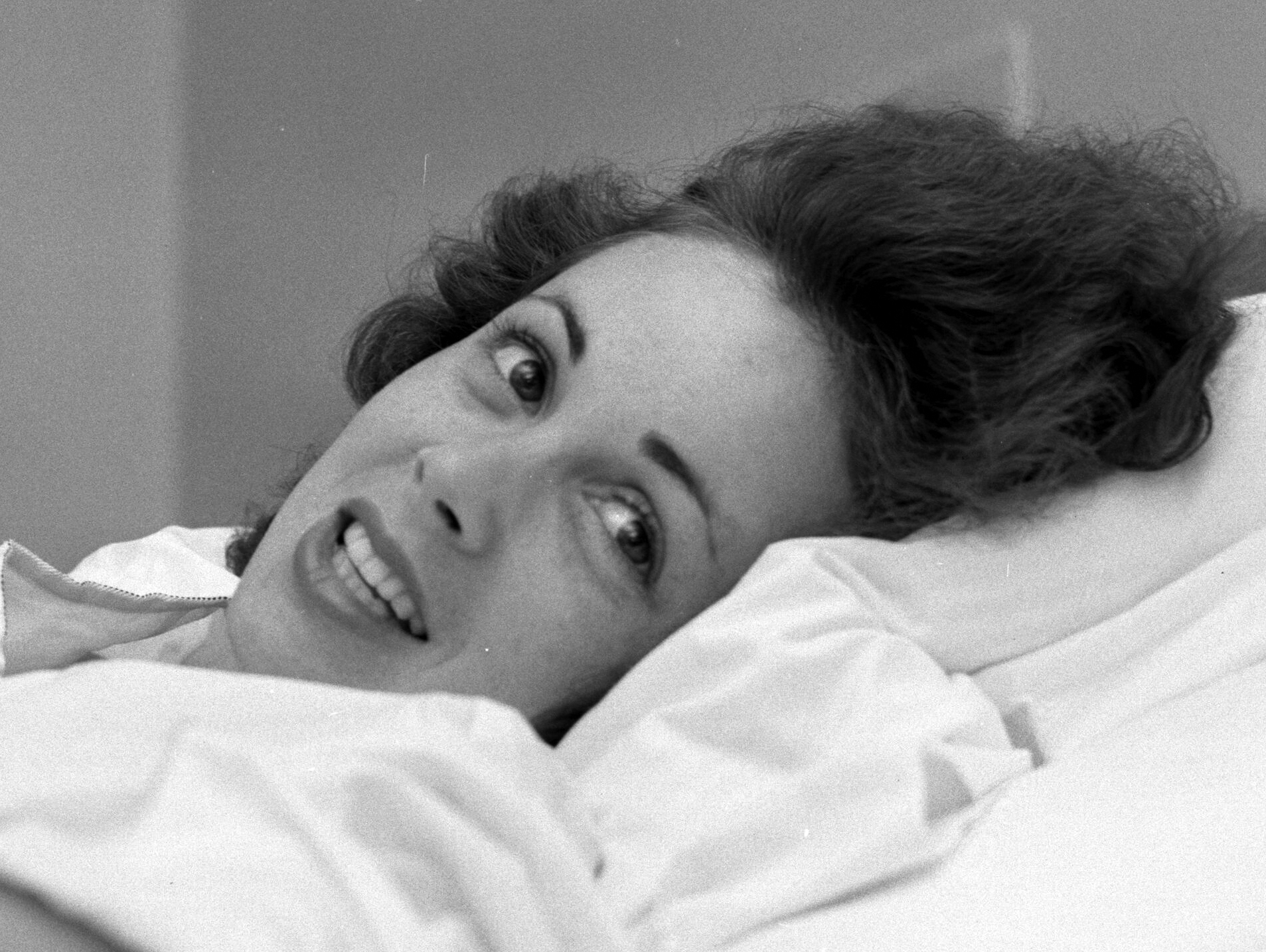
Marsh in hospital after the crash

On July 12, 1949, aged 30, Marsh was aboard Standard Air Lines Flight 897R, when the C-46E crashed. The flight had left Albuquerque, New Mexico, at 4:43 am. While on approach to the Lockheed Air Terminal in Burbank, California, at 7:40 am, the twin engine plane, flying too low, hooked a wingtip on a hill and crashed near Chatsworth, California, and Marsh was one of the 13 people who survived. Marsh was pulled from the wreckage by another passenger named Judy Frost. Marsh was hospitalized at Cedars of Lebanon Hospital for several weeks, and nearly had her left foot amputated. Marsh's doctors told her that she would likely never dance again, but after careful exercise she was able to heal and continue in her dancing.

== The Wizard of Oz ==
As a stand-in for Judy Garland, Marsh's role in the 1939 film The Wizard of Oz was uncredited. Nonetheless, she has appeared in Wizard of Oz film festivals, conventions, and reunions. As of April 2026, she is one of two known surviving alumni and is the last living adult to have worked on the film (the other living alum is Priscilla Montgomery, who was a child extra who appeared among the Munchkins); Marsh has outlived all major cast members, original Tin Man Buddy Ebsen, adult Munchkins, and several extras.

In 2011 aged 92, Marsh served as the Grand Marshal of the Oz-Stravaganza Parade in Chittenango, New York.

== Personal life ==
In 1939, Marsh married Lewis Isaacs Edwards. On September 28, 1950, Marsh married Bill Doll, a press agent to theatre and film producer, Mike Todd. They had a son, Jonathan. Her younger sister was film and television actress Dorothy Morris.

As of 2012, Marsh volunteers as a dance therapy instructor at the Palm Springs Stroke Activity Center, where the styles taught range from themes like ballroom dancing, country, Hawaiian, and belly dancing. Marsh Doll visits the center once a month on the first Monday. She is an active member of The Palm Springs United Methodist Community Church.

Marsh turned 100 in April 2019.

== Filmography ==
Year	Title	Role	Notes
1937	Rosalie	Dancer	Uncredited
1939	Gone with the Wind	BBQ Guest; Girl at Bazaar	Uncredited
1939	The Wizard of Oz	Stand-in: Judy Garland	Uncredited
1941	Ziegfeld Girl	Stand-in: Judy Garland	Uncredited
1942	Seven Sweethearts	Dancer	Uncredited
1943	Best Foot Forward	Dancer	Uncredited
1944	Hands Across the Border	Dancer	Uncredited
1944	Pickup Girl	N/A	Short film
1945	Secrets of a Sorority Girl	Audrey Scott	
1945	Navajo Kid	Winifred McMasters	
1946	Night and Day	Young Customer	Uncredited
1947	Smash-Up: The Story of a Woman	Bobby-Soxer	Uncredited
1947	Welcome Stranger	Wife	Uncredited
1947	Wild Harvest	Natalie	Uncredited
1948	Luxury Liner	Girl	Uncredited
1948	Adventures of Don Juan	Girl at Inn	Uncredited, final film role
