= Rhythm Round-Up =

1945 film by Vernon Keays

- Theatrical release poster
- Directed by: Vernon Keays
- Screenplay by: Charles R. Marion
- Story by: Louise Rousseau
- Produced by: Colbert Clark
- Starring: Ken Curtis; Cheryl Walker; Guinn "Big Boy" Williams; Raymond Hatton; Victor Potel
- Cinematography: John Stumar
- Edited by: Paul Borofsky
- Production company: Columbia Pictures
- Distributed by: Columbia Pictures
- Release date: September 7, 1945
- Running time: 66 minutes
- Country: United States
- Language: English

Rhythm Round-Up is a 1945 American Western musical film directed by Vernon Keays and written by Charles R. Marion. The film stars Ken Curtis, Cheryl Walker, Guinn "Big Boy" Williams, Raymond Hatton and Victor Potel. The film was released on September 7, 1945, by Columbia Pictures.

== Cast ==
- Ken Curtis as Jimmy Benson
- Cheryl Walker as Mary Parker
- Guinn "Big Boy" Williams as Zeke Winslow
- Raymond Hatton as Noah Jones
- Victor Potel as Slim Jensen
- Eddie Bruce as J. Appleton Lockwood
- Arthur Loft as Oscar Berton
- Walter Baldwin as Jed Morton
- Vera Lewis as Mrs. Squimp
- Bob Wills as Bob Wills
- Ken Trietsch as Ken
- Paul Trietsch as Hezzie
- Charles Ward as Gabe
- Gil Taylor as Gil
- Hal Hopper as Member of The Pied Pipers
- Jo Stafford as Member of The Pied Pipers
- Alan Storr as Member of The Pied Pipers
- Clark Yocum as Member of The Pied Pipers
