= Steppin' in Society =

1945 film by Alexander Esway

- Theatrical release poster
- Directed by: Alexander Esway
- Screenplay by: Bradford Ropes
- Produced by: Joseph Bercholz
- Starring: Edward Everett Horton; Gladys George; Ruth Terry; Robert Livingston; Jack La Rue; Lola Lane
- Cinematography: Reggie Lanning
- Edited by: Harry Keller
- Music by: Joseph Dubin
- Production company: Republic Pictures
- Distributed by: Republic Pictures
- Release date: July 9, 1945
- Running time: 72 minutes
- Country: United States
- Language: English

Steppin' in Society is a 1945 American comedy film directed by Alexander Esway, written by Bradford Ropes, and starring Edward Everett Horton, Gladys George, Ruth Terry, Robert Livingston, Jack La Rue and Lola Lane. It was released on July 9, 1945, by Republic Pictures.

== Cast ==
- Edward Everett Horton as Judge Avery Webster
- Gladys George as Penelope Webster
- Ruth Terry as Lola Forrest
- Robert Livingston as Montana
- Jack La Rue as Bow Tie
- Lola Lane as The Duchess
- Isabel Jewell as Jenny the Juke
- Frank Jenks as George
- Paul Hurst as Cookie
- Harry Barris as Ivory
- Iris Adrian as Shirley
- Tom Herbert as Hilliard
