= Beatrice Gray =

American actress

- Born: Bertrice Alice Kimbrough; March 3, 1911; Hancock County, Illinois, U.S.
- Died: November 25, 2009 (aged 98); Canoga Park, California, U.S.
- Occupation(s): Actress, dancer
- Children: Billy Gray

Beatrice Gray (March 3, 1911 – November 25, 2009) was an American actress and dancer best known for her appearances in a series of western films during the 1940s and 1950s.

Gray was born Bertrice Alice Kimbrough on a farm near Carthage, Illinois. She began working in the entertainment industry in Broadway productions, as well as a performer in nightclubs. She earned her first acting role in the musical, New Faces of 1935. After moving to California in 1937, she appeared in the New Faces of 1937 by RKO Pictures. She worked as a dancer for Busby Berkeley.

Gray appeared in a number of westerns throughout the 1930s, 1940s and 1950s, many of which were produced by Monogram Pictures. Her other films were with Universal Pictures, including the 1958 movie, Wild Heritage. She ultimately appeared in three films starring Hoot Gibson and Bob Steele - The Utah Kid, Marked Trails and Trigger Law (all 1944).

== Personal life ==
She and husband William H. Gray were parents of actor Billy Gray, best known for his role as Bud Anderson in the television series, Father Knows Best.

== Death ==
Beatrice Gray died of natural causes in Canoga Park, California, on November 25, 2009, at the age of 98.

== Selected filmography ==
- The Kansan (1943)
- The Utah Kid (1944)
- Trigger Law (1944)
- Marked Trails (1944)
- Trail of Vengeance (1945)
- Stranger from Santa Fe (1945)
- Abbott and Costello Meet the Killer, Boris Karloff (1949)
- The Yellow Cab Man (1950)
- The Gene Autry Show (TV, 1950)
- Callaway Went Thataway (1951)
- Untamed Frontier (1952)
- I've Lived Before (1956)
- Wild Heritage (1958)
