= Mary Castle =

American actress

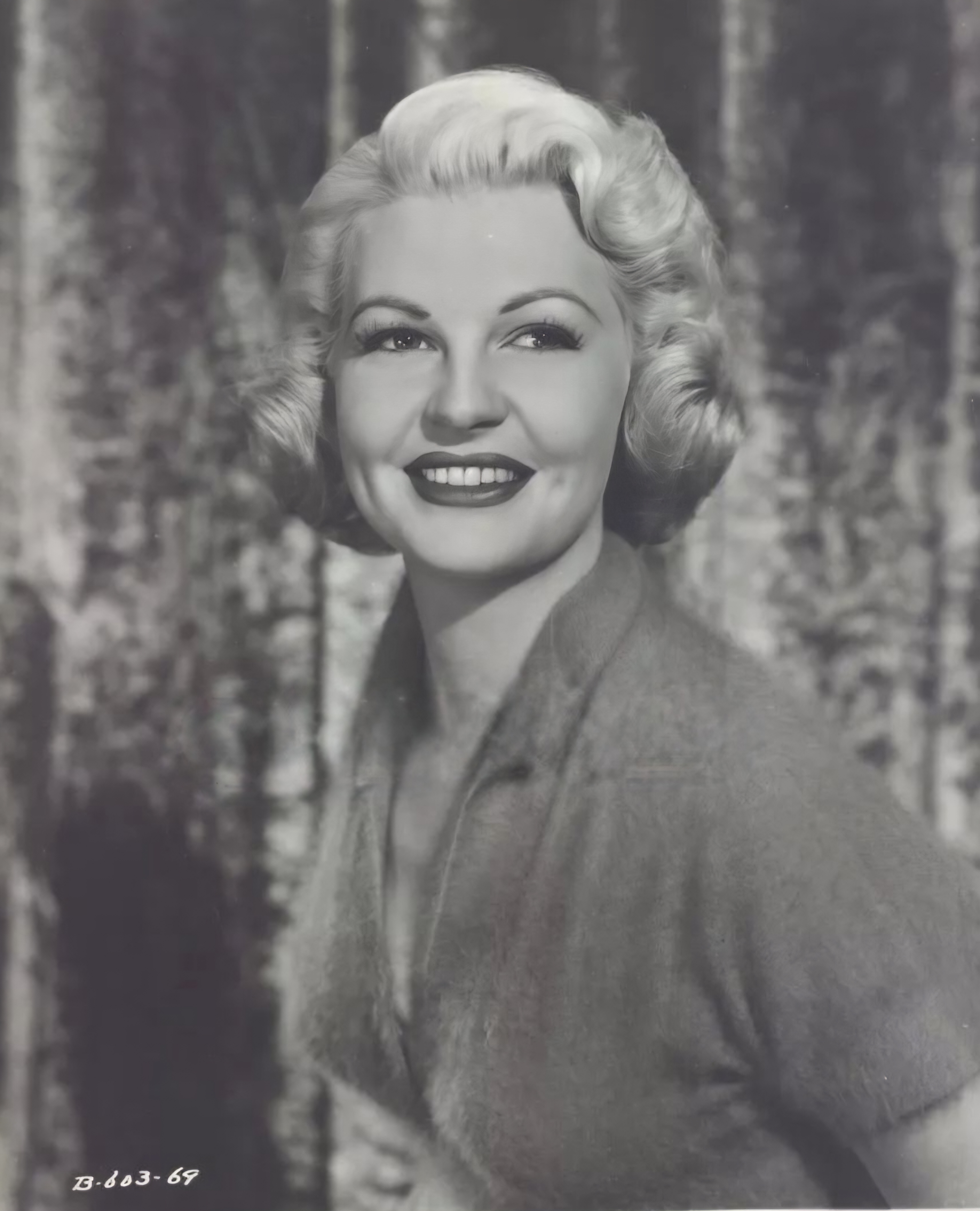
- Castle in Yaqui Drums (1956)
- Born: Mary Ann Noblett; January 22, 1931; Pampa, Texas, U.S.
- Died: April 29, 1998 (aged 67); Palm Springs, California, U.S.
- Occupation: Actress
- Years active: 1948–1962
- Spouses: William France Minchen (m. 1957–1959) Wayne Cote (m. 1960–1961) Erwin A. Frezza (m. 1971–1972)
- Children: 1

Mary Castle (born Mary Ann Noblett; January 22, 1931 – April 29, 1998) was an American actress. She appeared in the films When the Redskins Rode in 1951, Three Steps to the Gallows in 1953 and Gunsmoke in 1953. In 1954 she appeared opposite Jim Davis as 'Frankie Adams' in the television series Stories of the Century.

== Early life ==
Castle was born on January 22, 1931, on a ranch in Pampa, Texas. She later described life in Pampa as a place in the "[Texas] Panhandle where it can get cold and dusty." Castle's older brother Erby taught her trick riding at a young age. The family later moved to Fort Worth and then Phillips, Texas. As a child, Castle suffered from tuberculosis and missed school. "They had me all ready to be sent away to a TB home, but my mother couldn't stand to see it. So I stayed home. Plenty of rest and sleep cured me."

In 1943, her family moved to Long Beach, California where Castle attended high school. In 1946, at age 15 she gave birth to her daughter Judith but did not marry the father, described as a "Navy man" stationed in Long Beach, California. Changing her last name to "Castle", she modeled for a swimwear company and caught the attention of a Columbia Pictures talent scout who noticed the 5'6" brunette bore a striking resemblance to Rita Hayworth and subsequently signed her as an actress.

== Career ==
Castle's resemblance to Hayworth made news in the entertainment industry and led some columnists to taunt Hayworth about Castle replacing her as a star. One reporter went so far as to compare the two ladies' hip measurements, saying that Hayworth's hips were 36 inches compared to Castle's 36 and a half. Columbia immediately set about exploiting the story by including her in a number of 1950 films: The Tougher They Come, Prairie Roundup, and Texans Never Cry. In the opening of The Tougher They Come, Castle was shown sitting at a bar, "blankly staring ahead, her resemblance to Hayworth startling [and] her line readings deliberately slow and sultry to mimic her famous counterpart."

Castle then starred in the 1951 SuperCinecolor western When the Redskins Rode as Elizabeth Leeds, part Shawnee Indian and part French spy, who tries to seduce a Delaware Indian prince to persuade his people to fight with the French against the British. Upon Hayworth's return to Hollywood, following her separation from Aly Khan, Castle's contract with Columbia was allowed to expire on March 7, 1951.

Regarding her resemblance to Hayworth, Castle said, "I never minded that I looked like Rita. I thought it would be a help. But now that she might be coming back to Hollywood, I've got my doubts." Castle later told a columnist about her one meeting with Hayworth, saying, "I was under a dryer one day at the hairdressers, when Miss Hayworth came in with a friend. She didn't say a word to me, except 'How do you do,' and then, after staring hard, she said to her friend, 'My nose is straight, hers turns up. She doesn't look a bit like me.'"

Working for Universal Pictures, Castle continued to star in westerns, often playing a tough, physical role, such as the saloon singer Cora Dufrayne in the film version of Gunsmoke.

=== Stories of the Century ===
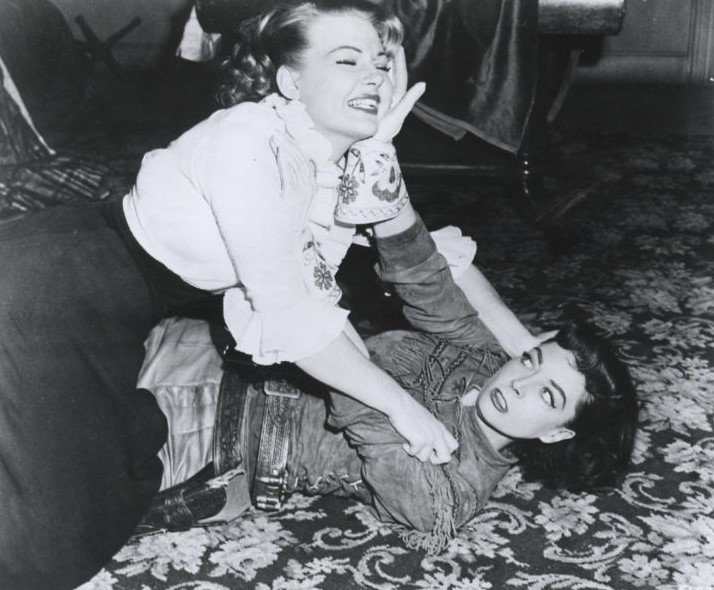
Castle, as blonde-haired railroad detective Frankie Adams battles brunette Marie Windsor as Belle Starr in Stories of the Century

Breaking with her established image, Castle dyed her hair blonde and signed a 1953 contract with Republic Pictures, co-starring with Jim Davis in what may have been her most famous role as the female railroad detective Frankie Adams in the Republic TV western Stories of the Century. A weekly 30-minute show, Castle proved to be a capable action figure, both with guns and her fists, engaging in catfights with Marie Windsor as "Belle Starr" and Joan Shawlee, an outlaw moll in "The Doolin Gang". Castle also slugged Gloria Winters with a right cross in "Little Britches". Castle battled male actors as well, pistol-whipping Bruce Bennett ("Quantrill and His Raiders") and Slim Pickens ("The Wild Bunch of Wyoming").

Despite Stories of the Century winning an Emmy for Best Western or Adventure Series, Castle was replaced by Kristine Miller. Although reason for the change was never made public, Miller said that she had been the original choice for the series but declined because she was pregnant, telling a journalist: "So Mary did the first ones. They decided they needed a change, so they called me, and at that time, my baby was six months old so I did the final 13." Miller failed to match Castle's "strength, humor and chemistry with Jim Davis" and the show performed poorly in Castle's absence.

=== Later years ===
Castle suffered from unspecified illnesses in the mid 1950s that limited her work. In 1956, once again as a blonde, she was cast in the Bowery Boys comedy Crashing Las Vegas. Entertainment columnist John Bustin wrote, "Mary Castle, a perennial starlet who's had difficulties getting rolling because of her remarkable resemblance to Rita Hayworth, is looking a lot less like Rita with her new blonde hair." Castle appeared in a number of television shows during the 1950s to include: The Bob Cummings Show, the Chevron Hall of Stars, Cheyenne, The O. Henry Playhouse, Dragnet, Perry Mason, and The Adventures of Ozzie and Harriet. In 1957 Republic Pictures released The Last Stagecoach West, co-starring Castle and Davis, that was originally filmed as the pilot for Stories of the Century earlier in the decade. In 1960, she had a minor appearance in the TV series Tightrope!. Castle's final screen appearance, as an unnamed dance hall girl, was in a 1962 episode of Gunsmoke.

== Personal life ==
=== Legal issues ===
On Christmas Eve, 1957, Castle and her then husband, William France Minchen engaged in a physical fight, blocking Sunset Strip traffic. At the time of the incident, Castle's 10-year-old daughter, Judith, was in the car's back seat. An intoxicated Castle was arrested after she kicked and bit a police officer who had intervened.

After divorcing Minchen in September 1959, she was found unconscious on a Malibu beach, clad only in bra and panties. Responding emergency personnel revived her and took her to Malibu Emergency Hospital. A month later, Castle was arrested for public drunkenness, followed by another arrest two weeks later, when she was found drunk in her automobile and attacked police officers who revived her. Castle then tried to hang herself in her cell. She was revived, released on bail and ended up paying a fine.

In December 1959, Castle was taken to court over a $4500 debt. Unable to pay, she filed for bankruptcy in February 1960, listing $13,678 in debts and her assets as $300 worth of clothing. On April 22, 1960, Castle was arrested again for drunkenness in public. Less than a week after her release, she pleaded guilty to failing to appear in court on a 1958 traffic violation, running a red light, and not having her license, and was ordered to pay a $50 fine.

=== Marriages ===
Castle was married three times. In April 1957, Castle eloped to Las Vegas with William France Minchen, an aspiring actor. The turbulent marriage lasted a little more than two years and the couple divorced in September 1959. She married her second husband, insurance broker Wayne Cote in September 1960. In August 1961, she was seeking an annulment and the couple divorced the following year. On May 7, 1971, she married her third husband, musician Erwin Angelo Frezza. The marriage ended in July 1972.

=== Final years and death ===
After her film and television career ended, Castle worked a variety of jobs in the restaurant and entertainment business, including working as the hostess at the Garden Room Restaurant at The Hollywood Roosevelt Hotel. Remembered as a western star of the silver screen she began to attend Western film festivals, receiving a silver commemorative plate from Gene Autry at the First Annual Western Film Festival in 1976 at the Biltmore Hotel in Los Angeles.

Diagnosed as bi-polar, Castle's behavior was increasingly disruptive until she received the proper medication later in life. Her final years were spent at her condo in Palm Springs. Castle died of lung cancer in Palm Springs on April 29, 1998.

== Filmography ==
Year	Title	Role	Notes
1948	Mexican Hayride	Girl	Uncredited
1949	Always Leave Them Laughing	Showgirl	Uncredited
1949	The Threat		
1950	The Tougher They Come	Flo	
1951	Prairie Roundup	Toni Eaton	
1951	Texans Never Cry	Rita Bagley	
1951	When the Redskins Rode	Elizabeth Leeds	
1951	Criminal Lawyer	Gloria Lydendecker	
1952	Just for You	U.S.O. Troupe	Uncredited
1952	The Lawless Breed	Jane Brown	
1952	Eight Iron Men	Girl	
1953	Three Steps to the Gallows (UK) White Fire (US)	Yvonne	
1953	Gunsmoke	Cora Dufrayne	
1956	Crashing Las Vegas	Carol LaRue	
1956	Yaqui Drums	Linda Quigg	
1957	The Last Stagecoach West	Louise McCord	
1957	Perry Mason	Enid Shaw	
1960	The Threat	Laura Wallace	
1960	The Jailbreakers	June	
