= Texans Never Cry =

1951 film by Frank McDonald

- Theatrical release poster
- Directed by: Frank McDonald
- Written by: Norman S. Hall
- Produced by: Armand Schaefer
- Starring: Gene Autry; Mary Castle; Russell Hayden; Gail Davis; Tom Keene; Don C. Harvey
- Cinematography: William Bradford
- Edited by: James Sweeney
- Production company: Gene Autry Productions
- Distributed by: Columbia Pictures
- Release date: March 15, 1951
- Running time: 66 minutes
- Country: United States
- Language: English

Texans Never Cry is a 1951 American Western film directed by Frank McDonald, written by Norman S. Hall and starring Gene Autry, Mary Castle, Russell Hayden, Gail Davis, Tom Keene and Don C. Harvey. The film was released on March 15, 1951 by Columbia Pictures.

== Plot ==
Gene Autry and the Texas Rangers investigate the counterfeiting of Mexican lottery tickets.

== Cast ==
- Gene Autry as Gene Autry
- Mary Castle as Rita Bagley
- Russell Hayden as Steve Diamond
- Gail Davis as Nancy Carter
- Tom Keene as Tracy Wyatt
- Don C. Harvey as Blackie Knight
- Roy Gordon as Frank Bagley
- Pat Buttram as Pecos Bates
- Michael Ragan as Rip Braydon
- Frank Fenton as Capt. Weldon
- Sandy Sanders as Bart Thomas
- John R. McKee as Edward Dunham
- Harry Mackin as Bill Ross
- Harry Tyler as Dan Carter
- Minerva Urecal as Martha Carter
- Richard Flato as Carlos Corbal
- I. Stanford Jolley as Red
- Duke York as Baker
- Roy Butler as Sheriff Weems
- Champion as Gene's Horse
