= Streamline Express =

1935 American comedy drama film

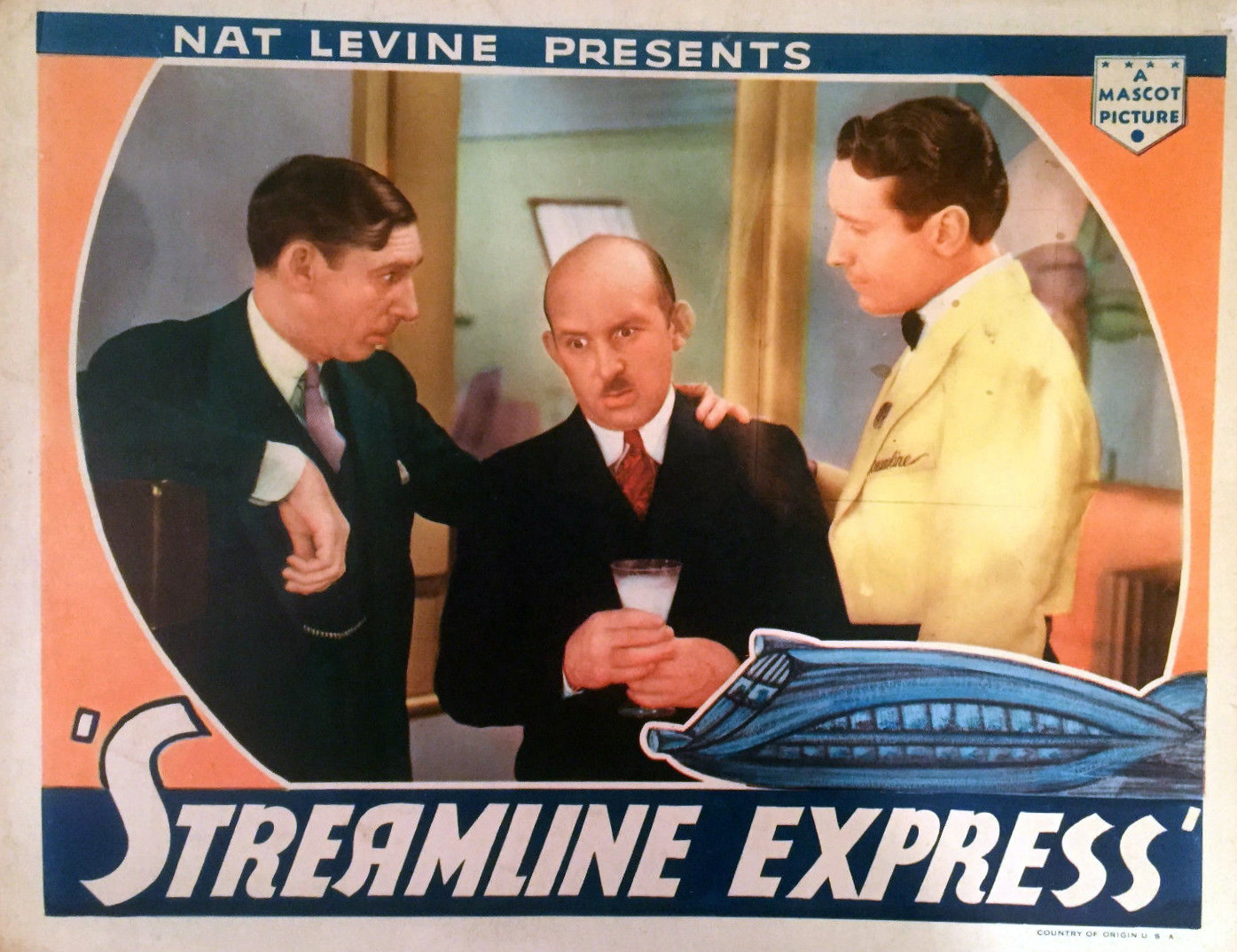
- Lobby card
- Directed by: Leonard Fields
- Written by: Wellyn Totman (story); Leonard Fields (screenplay) & David Silverstein (screenplay) & Olive Cooper (screenplay)
- Produced by: Nat Levine (producer); George Yohalem (supervising producer)
- Starring: See below
- Cinematography: Jack A. Marta; Ernest Miller
- Edited by: Joseph H. Lewis
- Distributed by: Mascot Pictures
- Release date: September 15, 1935
- Running time: 71 minutes
- Country: United States
- Language: English

Streamline Express is a 1935 American comedy drama film directed by Leonard Fields, starring Victor Jory, Evelyn Venable and Esther Ralston, distributed by Mascot Pictures. The film is an adaptation of Twentieth Century, released the previous year, in which Ralph Forbes appears in a similar role.

== Plot ==
Broadway star Patricia Wallace quits her Broadway show to run off with wealthy Fred Arnold. Her director Jimmy Hart follows them aboard a futuristic super-speed monorail, the Streamline Express. In its non-stop trip from New York City to Los Angeles in 20 hours, the double-decker Express can reach speeds up to 160 miles per hour. Meanwhile, also aboard is John Bradley and his mistress Elaine Vincent, but Bradley's wife Mary ends up on the train as well.

When Elaine gives her crooked pal Gilbert Landon a diamond pendant given her by Bradley, in order to keep Landon quiet about her past, she pretends that the pendant was stolen, in hopes of hiding the truth from Bradley. But Landon manages to throw suspicion on Jimmy Hart, who is masquerading as a steward. It takes confessions by several people to resolve everyone's dilemmas.

== Cast ==
- Victor Jory as Jimmy Hart
- Evelyn Venable as Patricia Wallace
- Esther Ralston as Elaine Vincent
- Erin O'Brien-Moore as Mary Bradley (character erroneously credited as "Mary Forbes")
- Ralph Forbes as Fred Arnold
- Sidney Blackmer as Gilbert Landon
- Vince Barnett as Mr. Jones
- Clay Clement as John Bradley (character erroneously credited as "John Forbes")
- Bobby Watson as Gerald Wilson
- Lee Moran as Larry Houston
- Syd Saylor as Smith, a Steward
- Libby Taylor as Fawn, Patricia's Maid
- Edward Hearn as Mack, a Purser
- Allan Cavan as Senior Conductor
- Wade Boteler as Baggage Gateman
- Harry Tyler as Steve
- Tommy Bupp as Wilbur, a Boy with Dog
- Morgan Brown as Bartender
- Jack Raymond as Baggage Man #1
- C. Montague Shaw as Physician
- Lynton Brent as Radio Operator
- John Ridgely as Second Steward
- Theodore von Eltz
