= Manhattan Love Song =

1934 film

- Directed by: Leonard Fields
- Written by: David Silverstein
- Based on: Manhattan Love Song by Cornell Woolrich
- Produced by: Trem Carr
- Starring: Robert Armstrong; Dixie Lee; Franklin Pangborn
- Cinematography: Robert H. Planck
- Edited by: Carl Pierson
- Music by: Bernie Grossman; Edward Ward
- Production company: Monogram Pictures
- Distributed by: Monogram Pictures
- Release date: April 30, 1934
- Running time: 73 minutes
- Country: United States
- Language: English

Manhattan Love Song is a 1934 American pre-Code romantic comedy drama film directed by Leonard Fields and starring Robert Armstrong, Dixie Lee and Franklin Pangborn. It was produced and distributed by Monogram Pictures. It is based on the 1932 novel of the same title by Cornell Woolrich. It is the first of Woolrich's works to be adapted to the screen, and the only adapted work of his that was not in the crime/film noir genre.

== Plot summary ==
Although sisters Geraldine and Carol Stewart live luxuriously in a Park Avenue apartment in New York City, their money has run out due to some bad business investments. Their servants, Williams and Annette, expect to be leaving, but the sisters invite them to remain in exchange for their unpaid back wages. They agree, then surprise the haughty sisters by expecting them to share in performing the household chores.

Geraldine looks for work, but receives no offers except for a striptease act in a burlesque show. Williams is mistaken for a taxi driver by a wealthy tourist, "Pancake Annie" Jones from Nevada, who has come with her son Phineas to seek an entry into Manhattan high society.

Carol elopes with a rich acquaintance, Garrett Wetherby, which leaves Geraldine on her own, needing money. She accepts the job doing a striptease, but is arrested when the club is raided. Williams decides to accept Pancake Annie's offer to go West in her employment. Geraldine realizes she loves Williams and asks to go along.

== Cast ==
- Robert Armstrong as Tom Williams
- Dixie Lee as Geraldine Stewart
- Nydia Westman as Annette
- Franklin Pangborn as Garrett Wetherby
- Cecil Cunningham as "Pancake Annie" Jones
- Harold Waldridge as Phineas Jones
- Helen Flint as Carol Stewart
- Herman Bing as Gustave
- George Irving as Kenbrook
- Emmett Vogan as Doctor
- Harrison Greene as Joe Thomas
- Eddie Dean as Sam
- Nick Copeland as Al Kingston
- Tom Ricketts as Rich Man
- Edward Peil Sr. as Employment Agent
- Hal Price as Gil, Taxicab Driver
- Frances Morris as Chorus Girl

== Soundtrack ==
- Dixie Lee - "A Little Shack on Fifth Avenue" (Music by Edward Ward and Bernie Grossman, words by David Silverstein)
- "Daisy" (uncredited player) - "Hang Up Your Hat" (Music by Edward Ward and Bernie Grossman, words by David Silverstein)

== Bibliography ==
- Bradley, Edwin M. Unsung Hollywood Musicals of the Golden Era: 50 Overlooked Films and Their Stars, 1929-1939. McFarland, 2016.
- Goble, Alan. The Complete Index to Literary Sources in Film. Walter de Gruyter, 1999.
