= The Last Stagecoach West =

1957 film

- Theatrical film poster
- Directed by: Joseph Kane
- Written by: Barry Shipman
- Produced by: Rudy Ralston
- Starring: Jim Davis; Mary Castle; Victor Jory
- Cinematography: Jack A. Marta
- Edited by: Joseph Harrison
- Music by: Jerry Roberts
- Production company: Ventura Productions
- Distributed by: Republic Pictures
- Release date: July 15, 1957
- Running time: 67 minutes
- Country: United States
- Language: English

The Last Stagecoach West is a 1957 American Western film directed by Joseph Kane and starring Jim Davis, Mary Castle, Victor Jory and Lee Van Cleef. The film's art direction was by Ralph Oberg.

In the early 1950s Republic Pictures decided to begin producing television shows and filmed a pilot for what became Stories of the Century. A few years later that pilot was reedited, and released as The Last Stagecoach West, which differs greatly from the syndicated television series.

== Plot ==
Rand McCord, owner of a local stage line, has to race his stage against the railroad, with the winner being awarded a government shipping contract. When McCord’s driver, Steve, loses to the railroad's locomotive, McCord decides to take up ranching, and offers Steve a job. Soon afterwards Steve reunites with a friend who rode with him as part of Quantrill's Raiders.

After a series of train robberies railroad detective Bill Cameron is sent to investigate, but the local telegraph operator intercepts a message about his coming, and shares it with the outlaws. Cameron arrives and rides out to speak with McCord, who is familiar with the area. He is near the ranch when he mets McCord’s daughter, Louise, and while the two are talking an outlaw gang begins firing at Cameron. The two escape uninjured. Cameron is impressed with Louise’s courage and tells her that he is a railroad detective.

Cameron becomes suspicious of Steve, and when cattle are rustled the detective tells the sheriff the stolen cattle may be sold to a construction boss buying beef to feed his work crew. Cameron is able to sneak up on the rustlers, but a masked rider causes a diversion, and the outlaws escape.

The outlaw gang try to rob a train while it is stopped for fuel. The masked rider is wounded, but is able to escape to the McCord ranch. The rider is Rand McCord and, before he dies, he confesses to his daughter that he organized the outlaws to steal from the railroad what he thought had been stolen from him.

At the end of the film Bill Cameron and Louise McCord marry.

== Cast ==
- Jim Davis as Bill Cameron
- Mary Castle as Louise McCord
- Victor Jory as Rand McCord
- Lee Van Cleef as Steve Margolies
- Grant Withers as Jack Fergus
- Roy Barcroft as Park Ketchum
- John Anderson as Angus MacKendrick
- Glenn Strange as Sheriff
- Francis McDonald as Old Man Colter
- Willis Bouchey as George Bryceson
- Lewis Martin as Ben Hardy
- Tristram Coffin as Gibson
- Percy Helton as Telegrapher

== See also ==
- List of American films of 1957
