= Frank Fenton (actor) =

American actor (1906–1957)

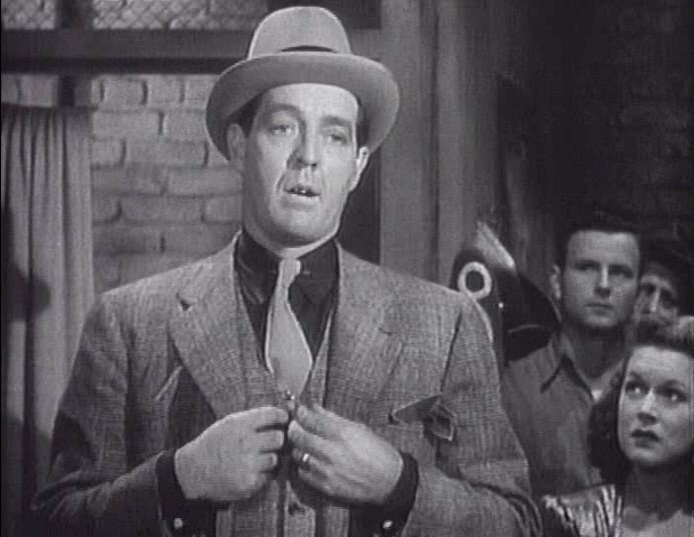
- Frank Fenton in Lady of Burlesque (1943)
- Born: Frank Fenton Moran; April 9, 1906; Hartford, Connecticut, U.S.
- Died: July 24, 1957 (aged 51); Los Angeles, California, U.S.
- Years active: 1942–1957
- Spouse: Queenie Bilotti (m. 1934–1948)
- Children: 2

Frank Fenton Moran (April 9, 1906 – July 24, 1957), known as Frank Fenton, was an American stage, film and television actor.

== Early years ==
Fenton graduated from Georgetown University, where he lettered as a tackle on the school's football team. He also was active in Georgetown's undergraduate dramatic club, for which he directed and wrote plays.

== Career ==
Fenton started his career on stage in New York, acting on Broadway in An American Tragedy (1926) billed as Frank Moran. As Frank Fenton, he starred in the Broadway versions of Susan and God with Gertrude Lawrence and as George Kittredge in The Philadelphia Story (1939) alongside Katharine Hepburn. His other Broadway credits include Stork Mad, O Evening Star, Dead End, and The O'Flynn. He also appeared on stage in London, and toured with Katherine Cornell in Romeo & Juliet and other plays.

Fenton's film debut came in The Navy Comes Through (1942). After moving to Hollywood for Barbara Stanwyck's Lady of Burlesque (1943), the Hartford, Connecticut, native appeared in more than 80 movies and television programs. Although the majority of his motion picture career was spent in supporting roles, he starred alongside John Carradine in Isle of Forgotten Sins (1943), which was re-issued as Monsoon.

Fenton was married from 1934 to 1948 to the former Aqueena Bilotti, daughter of sculptor Salvadore Bilotti. The couple had two daughters, Alicia and Honoree. They divorced in 1948.

He is often confused—in print and online—with screenwriter and novelist Frank Fenton (1903 – August 23, 1971). The actor dropped his last name early in his career to avoid confusion with other well-known Morans in New York City, including prizefighter Frank Moran, drama reporter Frank Moran, and George Moran of the popular comedy team Moran and Mack.

== Death ==
Fenton died at UCLA Medical Center on July 24, 1957, at age 51. He is buried in Holy Cross Cemetery in Culver City, California.

== Partial filmography ==
- The Navy Comes Through (1942) - Hodum
- Claudia (1943) - Hartley (uncredited)
- Aerial Gunner (1943) - Colonel - HAGS CO (uncredited)
- Lady of Burlesque (1943) - Russell Rogers
- Isle of Forgotten Sins (1943) - Jack Burke
- A Scream in the Dark (1943) - Sam 'Benny' Lackey
- Minesweeper (1943) - Lt. Ralph Gilpin
- Hi, Good Lookin'! (1944) - Gib Dickson
- Rosie the Riveter (1944) - Wayne Calhoun
- Buffalo Bill (1944) - Murdo Carvell
- Secret Command (1944) - Simms
- The Big Noise (1944) - Charlton
- Destiny (1944) - Sam Baker
- This Man's Navy (1945) - Captain Grant
- Hold That Blonde (1945) - Mr. Phillips
- Club Havana (1945) - Detective Lieutenant (uncredited)
- Getting Gertie's Garter (1945) - Winters (uncredited)
- The French Key (1946) - Horatio Vedder
- Big Town (1946) - Fletcher (uncredited)
- Swamp Fire (1946) - Capt. Pete Dailey
- If I'm Lucky (1946) - Marc Dwyer, Political Boss (uncredited)
- It's a Wonderful Life (1946) - Violet's Boyfriend (uncredited)
- Hit Parade of 1947 (1947) - Mr. Bonardi
- The Adventures of Don Coyote (1947) - Big Foot Ferguson
- Philo Vance's Secret Mission (1947) - Paul Morgan
- Magic Town (1947) - Birch
- Relentless (1948) - Jim Rupple
- Hazard (1948) - Utah Sheriff Bob Waybill
- A Foreign Affair (1948) - Major Mathews
- Bodyguard (1948) - Lt. Borden
- Renegades of Sonora (1948) - Sheriff Jim Crawford
- Mexican Hayride (1948) - Gus Adamson
- Rustlers (1949) - Brad Carew
- The Clay Pigeon (1949) - Lt. Cmdr. Prentice
- Joe Palooka in the Big Fight (1949) - Detective
- The Doolins of Oklahoma (1949) - Red Buck
- Ranger of Cherokee Strip (1949) - McKinnon
- The Golden Stallion (1949) - Oro City Sheriff
- Port of New York (1949) - G.W. Wyley (uncredited)
- The Lawless (1950) - Mr. Prentiss
- Sideshow (1950) - Manson
- Trigger, Jr. (1950) - Sheriff
- A Modern Marriage (1950) - Mr. Brown
- Streets of Ghost Town (1950) - Bart Selby
- Three Secrets (1950) - Sheriff Neil MacDonald (uncredited)
- Wyoming Mail (1950) - Gilson
- Tripoli (1950) - Capt. Adams
- Double Deal (1950) - Pete (uncredited)
- Prairie Roundup (1951) - Buck Prescott
- Rogue River (1951) - Joe Dandridge
- Texans Never Cry (1951) - Captain Weldon (uncredited)
- Silver City (1951) - Creede (uncredited)
- The Legend of the Lone Ranger (1952) - Ranger Captain (uncredited)
- Man in the Dark (1953) - Detective Driver (uncredited)
- Raiders of the Seven Seas (1953) - Salcedo's Officer (uncredited)
- Island in the Sky (1953) - Capt. Turner
- Vicki (1953) - Eric (uncredited)
- Gun Fury (1953) - Chuck - First Poker Player (uncredited)
- The Nebraskan (1953) - Army Captain (uncredited)
- Fury at Gunsight Pass (1956) - Sheriff Meeker
- The Naked Hills (1956) - Harold
- Cha-Cha-Cha Boom! (1956) - Head of Board of Directors (uncredited)
- Emergency Hospital (1956) - Edward Northrup (uncredited)
- Gun the Man Down (1956) - Sheriff Leading Posse (uncredited)
- Hell Bound (1957) - Harry Quantro (final film role)
