= Gunfire at Indian Gap =

1957 film by Joseph Kane

- Directed by: Joseph Kane
- Written by: Barry Shipman
- Produced by: Rudy Ralston
- Starring: Vera Ralston; Anthony George; George Macready
- Cinematography: Jack A. Marta
- Edited by: Frederic Knudtson
- Production company: Ventura Pictures Corporation
- Distributed by: Republic Pictures
- Release date: December 13, 1957 (United States)
- Running time: 70 minutes
- Country: United States
- Language: English

Gunfire at Indian Gap is a 1957 American Western film directed by Joseph Kane and starring Vera Ralston, Anthony George and George Macready.

The film's sets were designed by the art director Ralph Oberg.

== Cast ==
- Vera Ralston as Cheel Palmer
- Anthony George as Juan Morales
- George Macready as Mr. Jefferson
- Barry Kelley as Sheriff Daniel Harris
- John Doucette as Loder
- George Keymas as Scully
- Chubby Johnson as Samuel
- Glenn Strange as Matt
- Dan White as Fred Moran
- Steve Warren as Ed Stewart
- Chuck Hicks as Deputy
- Sarah Selby as Bessie Moran
- Joe Yrigoyen as Bill

== See also ==
- List of American films of 1957

== Bibliography ==
- Pitts, Michael R. Western Movies: A Guide to 5,105 Feature Films. McFarland, 2012.
