= I Killed That Man =

1941 film by Phil Rosen

- Directed by: Phil Rosen
- Written by: Henry Bancroft story = Leonard Fields; David Silverstein
- Produced by: Maurice King; Frank King
- Starring: Ricardo Cortez; Joan Woodbury; Iris Adrian
- Cinematography: Harry Neumann
- Edited by: Martin G. Cohn
- Music by: Johnny Lange; Lew Porter
- Production company: King Brothers Productions
- Distributed by: Monogram Pictures
- Release dates: 14 December 1941 (Chicago) 10 February 1942 (New York)
- Running time: 71 minutes
- Country: United States
- Language: English
- Budget: $20,000

I Killed That Man is a 1941 American mystery film directed by Phil Rosen and starring Ricardo Cortez, Joan Woodbury and Iris Adrian. Produced by the King Brothers for release by Monogram Pictures, it is a remake of the 1933 film The Devil's Mate which Rosen had also directed.

== Plot ==
A disparate group of individuals are in a room; some are gambling, some are drinking coffee, others are chatting as if at a party. Curtains are removed from the windows to reveal bars. The group is in a prison to witness the execution of hard core murderer Nick Ross. Ross is told there has been no commutation of his execution. Having never given a confession, Ross proceeds to tell the crowd of the true events of what happened as his benefactor promised him his release; but then falls over dead, the victim of a poison dart.

District Attorney Roger Phillips conducts a search of the occupants of the room and together with his girlfriend crime reporter Geri Reynolds and his young receptionist Tommy solve the murder and the criminal mastermind behind Ross.

Roger searches everyone in the room for the murder weapon, then has everyone return to the same seats in which they sat before Ross's murder.

Roger becomes suspicious of an elderly man named Lanning, Ross's character witness, because he has a cigarette holder which could be used as a dart blower. Lanning proclaims his innocence but is arrested.

Reporter Geri Reynolds, meanwhile, is sent to the prison, and Roger asks her to get acquainted with Lowell King, a parole board appointee. After Roger is reprimanded for arresting Lanning, whom he admits is an unlikely suspect, he asks Geri to interview Ross's girl friend, Verne Drake.

Verne defends her former boyfriend, but admits that he made a phone call from her apartment on the day of the murder. Verne only remembers part of the number, and shortly after Geri leaves, Verne gets a threatening phone call.

Roger sends police detective Collins to watch Verne, and recognizes the telephone number as King's. Roger is then mystified by a code written on the back of King's business card, and asks Tommy, a switchboard operator who wants to be a detective, to decipher it.

Roger questions King and he denies knowing Ross. But his butler, Gordon, admits to having placed bets with Ross.

Verne, meanwhile, plans to leave town and demands that J. Reed, the head of an organization which opposes capital punishment, return the money she gave him to obtain Ross's release. Reed, who was at the execution, accompanies Verne to the bank, but she dies suddenly after honking the car horn.

Collins catches Reed when he runs, and Roger later discovers a poisoned dart embedded in the steering wheel that matches the one that killed Ross. Roger arrests Reed and frees Lanning.

One evening, Geri and Bates, a fellow reporter, dine at Garrick's café, where Geri's check is refused. King comes in shortly after and, because he is friendly with Garrick, offers to help.

A waiter accepts King's check and takes it to Garrick's office. Garrick burns King's check, and gives the waiter a roll of money. King then gives the money to Geri, but still pays her bill.

Later, while waiting for Roger at his office, Geri realizes that the code on King's business card is for a library book. As Tommy is asking the investigative department to find out about the book, Geri accidentally drops her purse. Geri and Tommy are shocked to discover five $500 bills in her wallet, sandwiched between two one-dollar bills.

When Roger returns, Tommy tells him what transpired. King becomes Roger's new suspect after he learns that a library book on toxicology was checked out by Gordon. Tommy arranges for Roger and Bates to listen in on a telephone conversation between Garrick and King, who are partners in a protection racket, during which they hear that Garrick believed the money was intended for King.

At that moment, King reveals that Geri is with him, and Roger, Bates and Collins rush to his house. Roger bursts into King's office just as he is about to kill Geri with a poisoned dart. King confesses to the murders of both Ross and Verne, then tries to kill Roger. However, Geri knocks King out with a vase, and Bates and Collins capture Garrick and his thugs. Roger and Geri embrace, and Roger asks her to join his staff permanently.

== Cast ==
- Ricardo Cortez as Roger Phillips
- Joan Woodbury as Geri Reynolds
- Pat Gleason as Bates
- George Pembroke as Lowell King
- Iris Adrian as Verne Drake
- Herbert Rawlinson as Warden
- Ralf Harolde as Nick Ross
- Jack Mulhall as Collins
- Vince Barnett as Drunk
- Gavin Gordon as J. Reed
- John Hamilton as District Attorney
- Harry Holman as Lanning
- George P. Breakston as Tommy

== Production ==
Frank and Morris Kozinsky had just made their first film, Paper Bullets, with Phil Rosen and Joan Woodbury. They used Rosen and Woodbury again for this movie, their second. It was distributed by Monogram Pictures, who had wanted to distribute Paper Bullets. Filming started October 1941.

== Reception ==
The Chicago Daily Tribune said the acting was "all right" and the direction "pretty good" but that the story "gets away from a decidedly 'different' start into accustomed ruts."

== Bibliography ==
- Fetrow, Alan G. Feature Films, 1940-1949: a United States Filmography. McFarland, 1994.
