= Edgerton, Missouri =

City in Platte County, Missouri, United States

- City
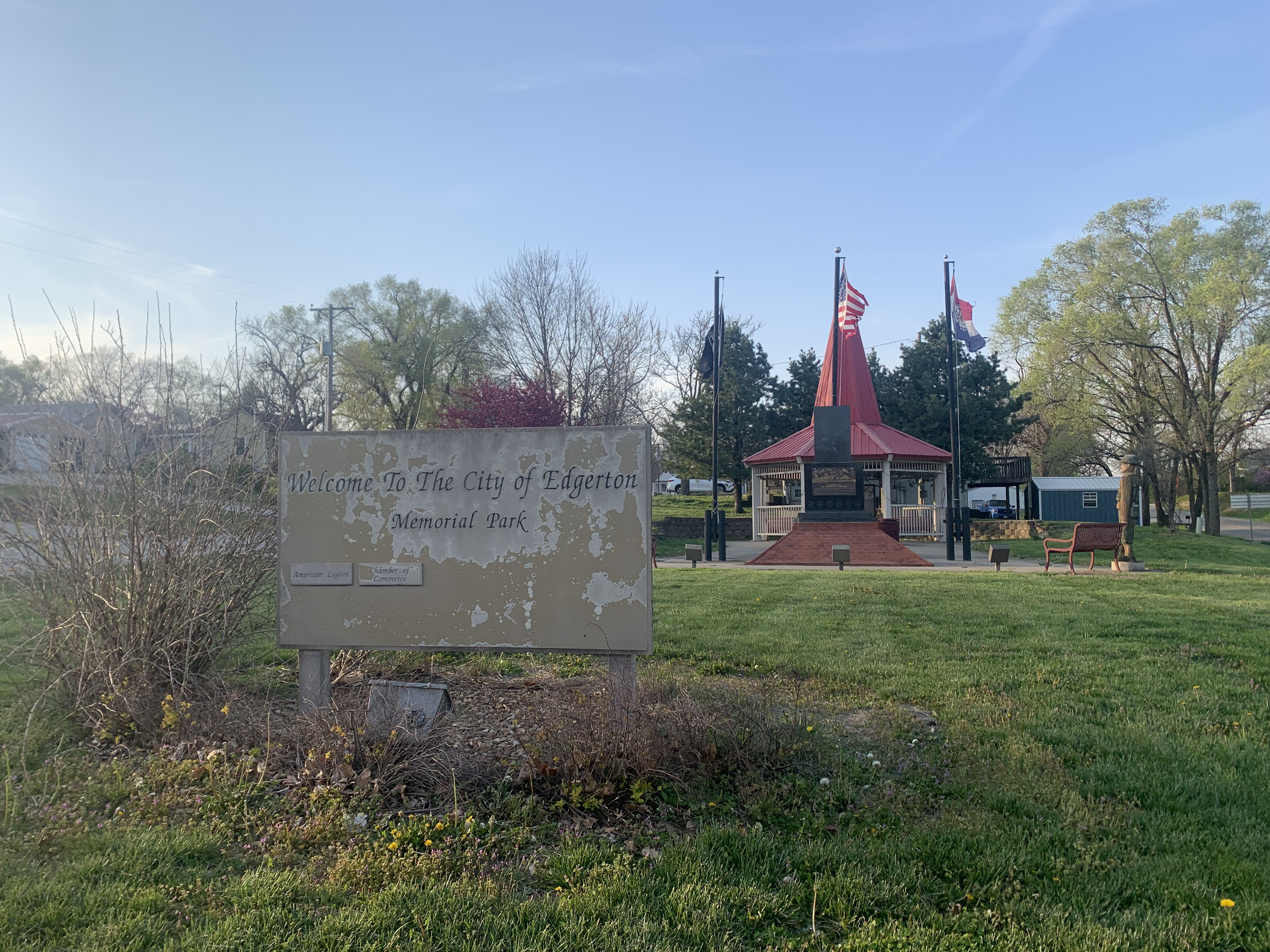
- Edgerton Memorial park

- Location of Edgerton, Missouri
- Coordinates: 39°30′05″N 94°37′39″W
- Country: United States
- State: Missouri
- County: Platte
- Township: Preston
- Incorporated: 1883

Area
  - Total: 1.13 sq mi (2.92 km^{2})
  - Land: 1.13 sq mi (2.92 km^{2})
  - Water: 0 sq mi (0.00 km^{2})
- Elevation: 840 ft (260 m)

Population (2020)
  - Total: 601
  - Density: 532.8/sq mi (205.72/km^{2})
- Time zone: UTC-6 (Central (CST))
  - Summer (DST): UTC-5 (CDT)
- ZIP code: 64444
- Area codes: 816, 975
- FIPS code: 29-21250
- GNIS feature ID: 2394619
- Website: cityofedgerton.org

Edgerton is a city in northeastern Platte County, Missouri, United States, that is part of the Kansas City metropolitan area. The population was 601 at the 2020 census.

== History ==
A post office called Edgerton has been in operation since 1871. The community was named after one Mr. Edgerton, a railroad employee.

== Geography ==
Edgerton is located along Missouri routes B and Z. The community is 1.5 miles east of the Platte River on Grove Creek. The Smithville Reservoir is about six miles east in adjacent Clinton County.

According to the United States Census Bureau, the city has a total area of 1.11 square miles (2.87 km^{2}), all land.

== Demographics ==
Historical population
Census	Pop.	Note	%±
1880	145		—
1890	482		232.4%
1900	534		10.8%
1910	534		0.0%
1920	558		4.5%
1930	427		−23.5%
1940	456		6.8%
1950	408		−10.5%
1960	449		10.0%
1970	477		6.2%
1980	584		22.4%
1990	565		−3.3%
2000	533		−5.7%
2010	546		2.4%
2020	601		10.1%
U.S. Decennial Census

=== 2010 census ===
As of the census of 2010, there were 546 people, 210 households, and 161 families living in the city. The population density was 491.9 inhabitants per square mile (189.9/km^{2}). There were 226 housing units at an average density of 203.6 per square mile (78.6/km^{2}). The racial makeup of the city was 97.6% White, 0.2% African American, 0.4% Native American, 0.9% Asian, and 0.9% from two or more races. Hispanic or Latino of any race were 0.9% of the population.

There were 210 households, of which 35.7% had children under the age of 18 living with them, 61.9% were married couples living together, 10.0% had a female householder with no husband present, 4.8% had a male householder with no wife present, and 23.3% were non-families. 20.0% of all households were made up of individuals, and 6.7% had someone living alone who was 65 years of age or older. The average household size was 2.60 and the average family size was 2.97.

The median age in the city was 40.2 years. 24.5% of residents were under the age of 18; 7% were between the ages of 18 and 24; 26% were from 25 to 44; 31.4% were from 45 to 64; and 11% were 65 years of age or older. The gender makeup of the city was 49.1% male and 50.9% female.

=== 2000 census ===
As of the census of 2000, there were 533 people, 202 households, and 159 families living in the city. The population density was 1,422.4 inhabitants per square mile (549.2/km^{2}). There were 214 housing units at an average density of 571.1 per square mile (220.5/km^{2}). The racial makeup of the city was 97.94% White, 0.38% Native American, and 1.69% from two or more races.

There were 202 households, out of which 38.1% had children under the age of 18 living with them, 69.8% were married couples living together, 7.4% had a female householder with no husband present, and 20.8% were non-families. 18.3% of all households were made up of individuals, and 7.9% had someone living alone who was 65 years of age or older. The average household size was 2.64 and the average family size was 3.01.

In the city the population was spread out, with 27.2% under the age of 18, 7.5% from 18 to 24, 30.6% from 25 to 44, 23.5% from 45 to 64, and 11.3% who were 65 years of age or older. The median age was 38 years. For every 100 females, there were 111.5 males. For every 100 females age 18 and over, there were 102.1 males.

The median income for a household in the city was $42,411, and the median income for a family was $50,625. Males had a median income of $35,167 versus $23,125 for females. The per capita income for the city was $18,444. About 7.5% of families and 9.8% of the population were below the poverty line, including 13.6% of those under age 18 and 16.1% of those age 65 or over.

== Education ==
Almost all of Edgerton is in the North Platte County R-I School District while a very small piece is in the East Buchanan County C-1 School District. North Platte County R-I School District operates one school in the community: North Platte Intermediate School.

Edgerton has a public library, a branch of the Mid-Continent Public Library.

== Notable person ==
- Jim Davis, actor and native of Edgerton

== See also ==
- List of cities in Missouri
