= Jim Davis (actor) =

American actor (1909–1981)

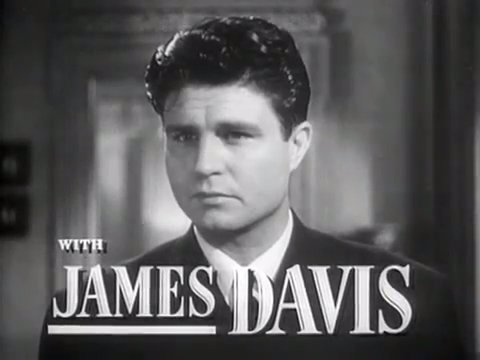
- Trailer for Winter Meeting (1948)
- Born: Marlin Davis; August 26, 1909; Edgerton, Missouri, U.S.
- Died: April 26, 1981 (aged 71); Northridge, Los Angeles, California, U.S.
- Resting place: Forest Lawn Memorial Park in Glendale, California
- Occupation: Actor
- Years active: 1942–1981
- Spouse: Blanche Hammerer (m. 1949)
- Children: 1

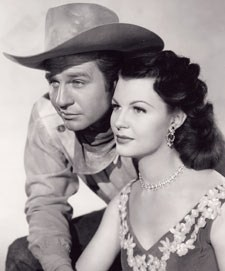
Davis and Mary Castle in TV's Stories of the Century (1954)

Jim Davis (born Marlin Otho Davis; August 26, 1909 – April 26, 1981) was an American actor, best known for his roles in television Westerns. In his later career, he became famous as Jock Ewing in the CBS primetime soap opera Dallas, a role he continued until he was too ill from multiple myeloma to perform. In 1981, his performance on the series earned him a posthumous nomination for a Primetime Emmy Award for Outstanding Lead Actor in a Drama Series.

== Life and career ==
Born in Edgerton in Platte County in northwestern Missouri, Davis attended high school in Dearborn, and the Baptist-affiliated William Jewell College in Liberty. At WJC, he played tight end on the football team and graduated with a degree in political science. He served in the United States Coast Guard during World War II.

He was known as Jim Davis by the time of his first major screen role, which was opposite Bette Davis in the 1948 melodrama Winter Meeting. His subsequent film career consisted of mostly B movies, many of them Westerns, although he made an impression as a U.S. Senator in the Warren Beatty conspiracy thriller The Parallax View.

Davis appeared 13 times on Death Valley Days. In 1954–1955, Davis starred and narrated Stories of the Century. He portrayed Matt Clark, a detective for the Southwest Railroad. In 1957 he played an outlaw with scruples in the 16th episode of Tales of Wells Fargo, entitled "Two Cartridges", with Dale Robertson.

From 1958–1960, Davis starred as Wes Cameron opposite Lang Jeffries in the role of Skip Johnson in the syndicated adventure series Rescue 8. About this time, he guest-starred on the syndicated crime drama, U.S. Marshal, starring John Bromfield.

Davis made two guest appearances on Perry Mason, as George Tabor in the season-six episode of "The Case of the Fickle Filly", and as murder victim Joe Farrell in the 1964, season-eight episode of "The Case of a Place Called Midnight". He also appeared on the Jack Lord adventure series, Stoney Burke. In 1964, Davis played Wyatt Earp in the episode "After the OK Corral" on Death Valley Days; William Tannen played the part of rancher and gunfighter Ike Clanton in the same episode.

Davis appeared eleven times on Gunsmoke and four times each on Daniel Boone, Wagon Train, and Laramie. In the next-to-the-last Laramie episode, entitled "Trapped" (May 14, 1963), he guest-starred with Tommy Sands, Claude Akins, and Mona Freeman. In the story line, Slim Sherman (John Smith) finds an injured female kidnap victim in the woods (Freeman). Dennis Holmes, as series-regular Mike Williams, rides away to seek help, but the kidnappers reclaim the hostage. Slim pursues the kidnappers, but is mistaken as a third kidnapper by the girl's father (Barton MacLane). Sands plays the girl's boyfriend, who had been ordered by her father to stop seeing her. Davis also appeared in an episode of The High Chaparral and in small roles in the 1971 John Wayne vehicles Rio Lobo (1970) and Big Jake (1971).

In 1974, he starred as Marshal Bill Winter in a short-lived ABC Western series The Cowboys, based on a 1972 film of the same name starring John Wayne.

=== Dallas and last years ===
After years of relatively low-profile roles, Davis was cast as family patriarch Jock Ewing on Dallas, which debuted in 1978.

The decision had already been made prior to Davis' death not to recast the character with another actor. Furthermore, after he died the producers strongly considered leaving his name and photos in the opening credits for the duration of the series.

The fifth-season episode "The Search", which confirmed the character's death in a helicopter crash on his way home to Dallas from South America, was broadcast on January 8, 1982, and contained flashback scenes of the character as well as a dedication to him prior to the closing credits.

== Personal life ==
In 1949, after two short failed marriages, he met Blanche Hammerer at the club "Mocambo" on the Sunset Strip. They later married and remained together for more than 30 years, until Davis's death in 1981.

Their only child, daughter Tara Diane Davis, was killed in an automobile accident at the age of 17. Davis later became close to his Dallas co-star Victoria Principal, who had a physical resemblance to his late daughter.

== Death ==
Davis died at his home in Northridge, California from multiple myeloma, on April 26, 1981, aged 71. He is interred at Forest Lawn Memorial Park Cemetery in Glendale, California.

== Recognition ==
In February 1960, having already appeared as a guest star on 50 episodes across 20 different television series and having been the series lead of both Stories of the Century and Rescue 8, Davis received a star on the Hollywood Walk of Fame, at 6290 Hollywood Boulevard, Hollywood, California.

== Filmography ==
Film
Year	Title	Role	Notes
1942	Cairo	Sergeant	Uncredited
1942	Northwest Rangers	Mountie	Uncredited
1942	Keep 'Em Sailing	Joseph Cummins	Short film
1942	White Cargo	Seaplane Pilot	Uncredited
1942	Tennessee Johnson	Reporter	Uncredited
1942	Stand By for Action	Talker	Uncredited
1943	Three Hearts for Julia	Daily Globe Staff Member	Uncredited
1943	Pilot #5	Military Policeman	Uncredited
1943	Salute to the Marines	Private Saunders	Uncredited
1943	Swing Shift Maisie	Investigator	Uncredited
1945	What Next, Corporal Hargrove?	Sgt. Hill	
1946	Up Goes Maisie	Matthews	Uncredited
1946	Gallant Bess	Harry	
1947	The Beginning or the End	Pilot at Tinian	
1947	The Romance of Rosy Ridge	Badge Dessark	
1947	Merton of the Movies	Von Strutt's Assistant	Uncredited
1947	The Fabulous Texan	Sam Bass	
1948	Winter Meeting	Slick Novak	
1949	Red Stallion in the Rockies	Dave Ryder	
1949	Hellfire	Gyp Stoner	
1949	Yes Sir, That's My Baby	Joe Tascarelli	
1949	Brimstone	Nick Courteen	
1950	The Savage Horde	Lt. Mike Baker	
1950	Hi-Jacked	Joe Harper	
1950	The Cariboo Trail	Bill Miller	
1950	The Showdown	Cochran	
1950	California Passage	Lincoln Corey	
1951	Three Desperate Men	Fred Denton	
1951	Oh! Susanna	Ira Jordan	
1951	Cavalry Scout	Lt. Spaulding	
1951	Little Big Horn	Cpl. Doan Moylan	
1951	Silver Canyon	Wade McQuarrie	
1951	The Sea Hornet	Tony Sullivan	
1952	Rose of Cimarron	Willie Whitewater	
1952	Woman of the North Country	Steve Powell	
1952	The Big Sky	Streak	
1952	Ride the Man Down	Red Courteen	
1953	Bandit Island	Brad Bellows	Short film
1953	Woman They Almost Lynched	Cole Younger	
1953	The President's Lady	Jason Robards	Uncredited
1954	Jubilee Trail	Silky	
1954	The Big Chase	Brad Bellows	
1954	The Outcast	Major Linton Cosgrave	
1954	The Outlaw's Daughter	Marshal Dan Porter	
1954	Hell's Outpost	Sam Horne	
1955	Timberjack	Poole	
1955	The Last Command	Ben Evans	
1955	The Vanishing American	Glendon	
1955	Last of the Desperados	Chief Deputy John Poe	
1956	The Bottom of the Bottle	George Cady	
1956	The Wild Dakotas	Aaron Baring	
1956	The Maverick Queen	The Stranger / Jeff Younger	
1956	Blonde Bait	Nick Randall	Uncredited (USA version)
1956	Frontier Gambler	Tony Burton	
1957	Duel at Apache Wells	Dean Cannary	
1957	The Quiet Gun	Ralph Carpenter	
1957	The Badge of Marshal Brennan	Jeff Harlan / The Stranger	
1957	Monster from Green Hell	Dr. Quent Brady	
1957	The Restless Breed	Newton	
1957	The Last Stagecoach West	Bill Cameron	
1957	Apache Warrior	Ben Ziegler	
1957	Raiders of Old California	Captain Angus Clyde McKane	
1958	The Toughest Gun in Tombstone	Johnny Ringo	
1958	Wolf Dog	Jim Hughes	
1958	Flaming Frontier	Col. Hugh Carver	
1958	A Lust to Kill	Marshal Matt Gordon	
1959	Alias Jesse James	Frank James	
1960	Noose for a Gunman	Case Britton	
1960	The Magnificent Seven	Gunman	Uncredited
1961	Frontier Uprising	Jim Stockton	
1961	The Gambler Wore a Gun	Case Silverthorne	
1964	Iron Angel	Sgt. Walsh	
1965	Zebra in the Kitchen	Adam Carlyle	
1966	Jesse James Meets Frankenstein's Daughter	Marshal MacPhee	
1966	El Dorado	Jim Purvis (Bart Jason's foreman)	
1967	Fort Utah	Scarecrow	
1967	Border Lust		
1968	The Road Hustlers	Noah Reedy	
1968	They Ran for Their Lives	Vince Ballard	
1969	The Ice House	Jake	
1970	Five Bloody Graves	Clay Bates	
1970	Monte Walsh	Cal Brennan	
1970	Rio Lobo	Riley	
1971	Vanished	Capt. Cooledge	TV movie
1971	Big Jake	Head of the Lynching Party	
1971	Dracula vs. Frankenstein	Sgt. Martin	
1971	The Trackers	Sheriff Naylor	TV movie
1972	The Honkers	Sheriff Potter	
1972	Bad Company	Marshal	
1973	One Little Indian	Trail Boss	
1973	Deliver Us from Evil	Dixie	TV movie
1974	The Parallax View	George Hammond	
1974	Inferno in Paradise	Rocky Stratton	
1975	Satan's Triangle	Hal Bancroft	TV movie
1975	The Runaway Barge	Capt. Buckshot Bates	TV movie
1976	Law of the Land	Sheriff Pat Lambrose	TV movie
1977	The Legend of Frank Woods	Deputy	
1977	Enigma	Colonel Valentine	TV movie
1977	Just a Little Inconvenience	Dave Erickson	TV movie
1977	The Choirboys	Capt. Drobeck	
1978	Killing Stone	Sen. Barry Tyler	TV movie
1978	Comes a Horseman	Julie Blocker	
1980	The Day Time Ended	Grant Williams	
1981	Don't Look Back: The Story of Leroy 'Satchel' Paige	Mr. Wilkenson	TV movie (final film role)

Television
Year	Title	Role	Notes
1951–1954	Fireside Theatre	Col. Streeter; Luther; Wesley Dean	9 episodes
1952	Dangerous Assignment	Bill Norton; Walter Norton; Lt. Makam; Holcomb; Guard	5 episodes
1952	Gang Busters	Capt. Bob Stewart	Episode: "The Barrow Gang"
1952	The Unexpected	Detective	Episode: "Leopards in Lighting"
1952–1953	Cowboy G-Men	Tom Owens; Sheriff Jack Wardlow; Wilson; Dance / Shafer Henchman	Episode: "Running Iron"; Episode: "Silver Shotgun"; Episode: "Stolen Dynamite"; Episode: "Double Crossed"
1953	Death Valley Days	Congressman Mark Tabor	Season 2, Episode 2, "Little Washington"
1953–1969	Death Valley Days	Pony Cragin; Luke Campbell; Manly; The Sheriff; Col. William Butler	9 other episodes
1954–1955	Stories of the Century	Matt Clark	39 episodes
1955	Cavalcade of America	J. L. Armstrong	Episode: "The Texas Rangers"
1957	The Millionaire	Jim Driskill	Episode: "The Jim Driskill Story"
1957	Playhouse 90	Sheriff	Episode: "Four Women in Black"
1957–1958	The Silent Service	Walter Ruhe	Episode: "Boomerang"; Episode: "Cargo for Crevalle"; Episode: "The Sea Devil Attacks Puget Sound"
1957; 1961; 1962	Tales of Wells Fargo	Al Porter; Sam Horne; Jonus Sawyer	Episode: "Two Cartridges"; Episode: "The Lobo"; Episode: "Don't Wake a Tiger"
1958	26 Men	Father Diego	Episode: "The Bells of St. Thomas"
1958	M Squad	Harry Evans / Mickey Seville	Episode: "The Case of the Double Face"
1958–1960	Rescue 8	Wes Cameron	78 episodes
1958; 1960	General Electric Theater	Fitz; Cole Treuitt	Episode: "The Castaway"; Episode: "Journey to a Wedding"
1959	U.S. Marshal	Harvey Granger	Episode: "Federal Agent"
1959	Yancy Derringer	Bullet Pike	Episode: "Two Tickets to Promontory"
1960	Markham	Neal Holland	Episode: "The Snowman"
1960	The Tall Man	Bob Orringer	Episode: "Forty-Dollar Boots"; Episode: "The Lonely Star"
1960; 1962–1963	Laramie	Hake Ballard; Ben McKittrick; Joe; Jim Genoway	Episode: "Trail Drive"; Episode: "Shadow of the Past"; Episode: "The Dispossessed"; Episode: "Trapped"
1960 1962; 1963; 1964	Wagon Train	Gabe Henry; Dan Ryan; Clyde Hubble; Rudd Basham	Episode: "The Candy O'Hara Story"; Episode: "The Eve Newhope Story"; Episode: "The Jim Whitlow Story"; Episode: "The Melanie Craig Story"
1961	Manhunt	Catlin; Otto	Episode: "Kidnapped"; Episode: "The Guest of Honor
1961	The Deputy	Trace Phelan	Episode: "The Lonely Road"
1961	Coronado 9	Barton Kincaid	Episode: "Gone Goose"
1961	Outlaws	Steed	Episode: "The Brothers"
1961	Gunslinger	Jeb Crane	Episode: "New Savannah"
1961	The Aquanauts	Sam Hogarth	Episode: "The Diana Adventure"
1961	Whispering Smith	Sam Chandler	Episode: "The Homeless Wind"
1961; 1965; 1968	Bonanza	Sam Wolfe; Johnny; Sam Butler	Episode: "The Gift"; Episode: "Lothario Larkin"; Episode: "The Arrival of Eddie"
1962	Thriller	The Marshal	Episode: "'Til Death Do Us Part"
1962	Lassie	Ed Bates	Episode: "Quick Brown Fox"
1962	Stoney Burke	Shep Winters	Episode: "Cousin Eunice"
1962	Have Gun – Will Travel	Al Long	Episode: "The Treasure"
1962; 1964	Perry Mason	George Tabor; Joe Farrell	Episode: "The Case of the Fickle Filly"; Episode: "The Case of a Place Called Midnight"
1962; 1965	Rawhide	Sheriff Sam Jason	Episode: "The Greedy Town"; Episode: "The Pursuit"
1963	The Donna Reed Show	Red	Episode: "Pioneer Woman"
1963	Alcoa Premiere	Tim	Episode: "Jenny Ray"
1964	The Littlest Hobo	Danny Kilgarren	Episode: "Double-Cross"
1965	The Lucy Show	Cardenas	Episode: "Lucy Goes to Vegas"
1965	Laredo	Sheriff Wes Cottrell	Episode: "The Golden Trail"
1965; 1966	Branded	Malachi Murdock; Wheeler; James Swaney	Episode: "One Way Out"; Episode: "Salute the Soldier Briefly"; Episodes: "The Assassins: Part 1 & 2"
1966	The Time Tunnel	Col. Jim Bowie	Episode: "The Alamo"
1966; 1967; 1969	Daniel Boone	Carpenter; Sam Ralston; Scud Tumbrill; Rafe Carson	Episode: "River Passage"; Episode: "The Ordeal of Israel Boone"; Episode: "A Pinch of Salt"; Episode: "The Road to Freedom"
1967	Hondo	Krantz	Episode: "Hondo and the Eagle Claw"; Episode: "Hondo and the War Cry"; Episode: "Hondo and the War Hawks"
1966–1974	Gunsmoke	Wes Cameron; Sheriff Shackwood; Amos Carver; Dave Carpenter; Luke Rumbaugh Ciell Williams	11 episodes
1967	Cimarron Strip	Clo Vardeman	Episode: "The Search"
1968	The Guns of Will Sonnett	Sheriff Hawks	Episode: "The Warriors"
1968	The Virginian	McKinley	Episode: "The Heritage"
1970	The High Chaparral	Robbins	Episode: "New Hostess in Town"
1971	The Men from Shiloh	Roper	Episode: "The Politician"
1972	Night Gallery	Abe Bennett	Episode: "The Waiting Room"
1972	The Bold Ones: The New Doctors	Peter Merlino	Episode: "Discovery at Fourteen"
1972	The Sixth Sense	Anson Beige	Episode: "Echo of a Distant Scream"
1972	The F.B.I.	Ellis Bengston	Episode: "The Runner"
1972	The Wonderful World of Disney	Col. Porter	Episode: "The High Flying Spy" Part 1
1973	Cannon	Henry Rawdon	Episode: "The Seventh Grave"
1973	Kung Fu	Joe Walker; Sheriff Grogan	Episode: "The Soul is the Warrior"; Episode: "The Well"
1973	Banacek	Ed McKay	Episode: "If Max is So Smart, Why Doesn't He Tell Us Where He Is?"
1973; 1974	The Streets of San Francisco	Reid Bradshaw; Roy Johnson	Episode: "Shattered Image"; Episode: "The Hard Breed"
1974	The Cowboys	Marshal Bill Winter	12 episodes
1975	Caribe	David Mayfield	Episode: "Lady Killer"
1976	The Blue Knight	Daniels	Episode: "Death Echo"
1976	The Quest	Marshal Pulman	Episode: "Prairie Woman"
1977	The Oregon Trail	J. D. Price	Episode: "Evan's Vendetta"
1977	Hunter	Raymond Spencer	Episode: "The Hit"
1978	Project U.F.O.	Earl Clay	Episode: "Sighting 4002: The Joshua Flats Incident"
1979	The Wonderful World of Disney	Pop Apling	Episode: "Trail of Danger" Parts 1 & 2
1978–1981	Dallas	Jock Ewing	77 episodes (final TV role)
