= Joan Woodbury =

American actress (1915–1989)

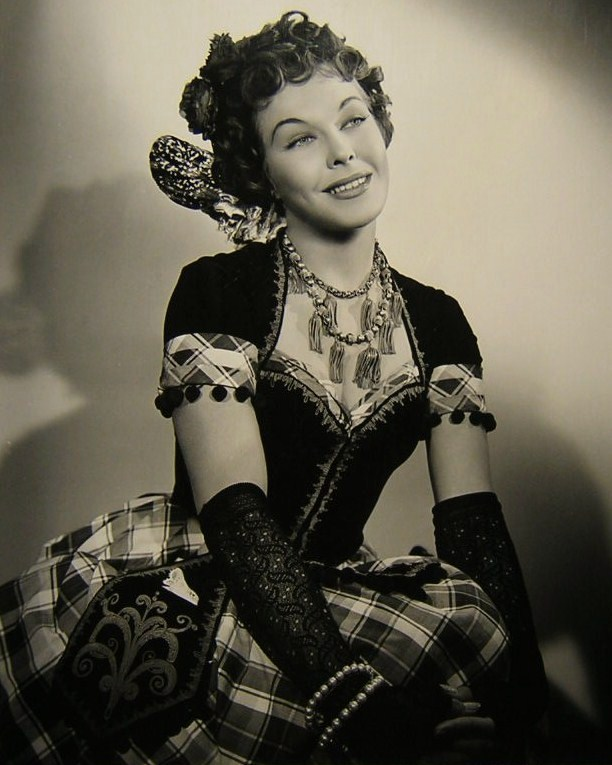
- Woodbury in The Desperadoes (1943)
- Born: Joan Elmer Woodbury; December 17, 1915; Los Angeles, California, U.S.
- Died: February 22, 1989 (aged 73); Desert Hot Springs, California, U.S.
- Other name: Nana Martínez
- Occupation: Actress
- Years active: 1934–1964
- Spouses: Henry Wilcoxon (m. 1938; div. 1969) Ray Mitchell (m. 1971)
- Children: 3

Joan Elmer Woodbury (December 17, 1915 – February 22, 1989) was an American actress beginning in the 1930s and continuing well into the 1960s.

== Early life ==
Woodbury was born in Los Angeles, California on December 17, 1915. Her father was Elmer Franklin Woodbury, and her mother was born Joan Meta Hadenfeldt, whose father, Charles Hadenfeldt, had emigrated to the US from Germany. Elmer owned various hotels, including the La Casa Grande and Maryland hotels in Pasadena and the Hotel Richelieu in downtown Los Angeles. Her mother had been Pasadena's Tournament of Roses 'Rose Queen' six times and had been in vaudeville. When she was five years old, she and her mother appeared in Oliver Morosco's The Half Breed.

When she was four years old, Joan had an 18-year-old live-in governess, Marie Sandow. In 1922, when she was six, she was selected for the leading role in a series of children's fairy story films; an article about this in the San Francisco Chronicle commented, "Joan Woodbury has been known for some time as America's 100 Percent Child, and has been photographed, sketched and painted by many artists." She first studied for seven years in a convent, later trained in dance, and eventually graduated from Hollywood High School. Woodbury began dancing for the Agua Caliente dance company and, at 19, decided to attempt a career in acting.

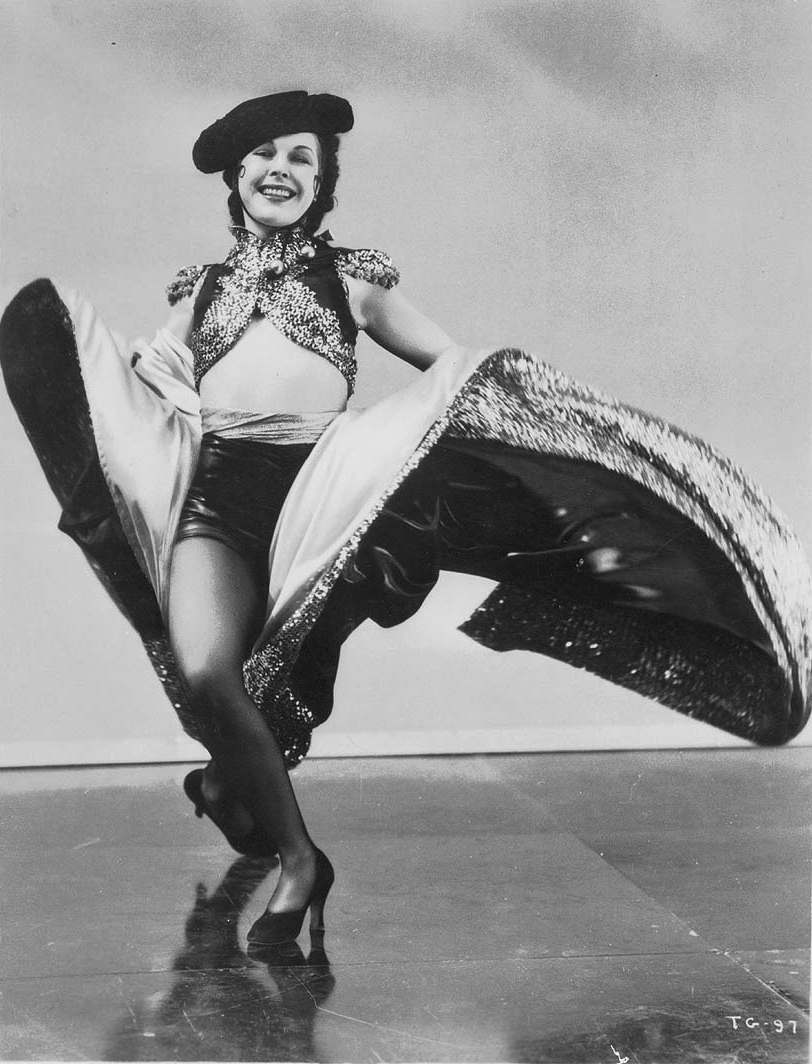
Joan Woodbury performing 'Toreador' dance, from 'There Goes My Girl', ca. 1930, Sam Hood

She moved to Hollywood and that same year received her first acting role in the 1934 film Eight Girls in a Boat, which was uncredited. Another uncredited role followed, with her first credited role being in the 1934 film One Exciting Adventure, which starred Binnie Barnes. Her first major role, billed as Nana Martinez, was in a Hopalong Cassidy movie The Eagle's Brood. Woodbury appeared in 15 films from 1934 through 1935, of which 10 were uncredited.

== Career rise ==
In 1936, her career began to become more successful, with appearances in eight films that year, of which five were uncredited. However, of the three roles that were credited, Woodbury made an impact, and caught the attention of studios. Her mixture of Danish, British, and Native American heritage gave her an exotic appearance, and allowed her to be cast in many different ethnicities, from Hispanic to French and Asian. By 1937, her career had taken off, mostly in B-movies such as Living on Love and Bulldog Courage, but also with her receiving many credited roles.

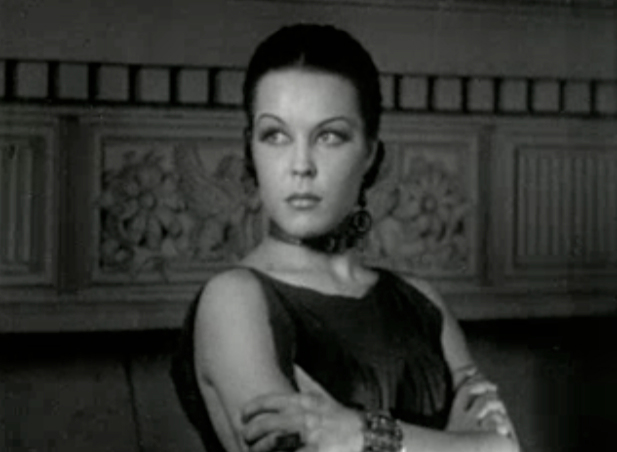
Woodbury in The Rogues Tavern (1936)

In 1937, Woodbury starred in her first of several credited Charlie Chan films, titled Charlie Chan on Broadway. She also began appearing in numerous Westerns, portraying the heroine opposite some of the 1930s' biggest cowboy actors, including William Boyd of Hopalong Cassidy fame, Roy Rogers, and Johnny Mack Brown. Woodbury appeared in 50 films from 1937 to 1945, almost all of which were credited. Her most memorable of that period was her lead role in the serial Brenda Starr, Reporter, in 1945.

== Personal life ==
On December 17, 1938, Woodbury married actor and producer Henry Wilcoxon, with whom she had three daughters: Wendy Joan Robert, Heather Ann (named after Heather Angel), and Cecilia Dawn "CiCi" (named after Cecil B. DeMille). They divorced in 1969. After the marriage, according to film critic Don Daynard, she "continued her career but never graduated from the minors", featuring in such films as Barnyard Follies, In Old Cheyenne, and Brenda Starr, Reporter. She married actor Ray Mitchell in 1971, and they remained together until her death.

== Founding of the Valley Players Guild and retirement ==
From 1946, her career declined, more due to her desire to spend more time with her family than her not having acting offers. She founded the company Valley Players Guild in Palm Springs, California with her husband Ray Mitchell. The Valley Players Guild staged plays featuring veteran actors and actresses.

In addition to managing their company, she continued to act on occasion, with her biggest role after 1946 being a credited part in the 1956 epic The Ten Commandments, starring Charlton Heston, Yul Brynner, and Anne Baxter. Her last film appearance was a supporting role in the movie The Time Travelers (1964).

In 1963–1964, Woodbury was on the television program Adventure in Art on KCHU-TV, a UHF station in San Bernardino, California. The program consisted of "26 dramatized and illustrated series of exciting adventures in the world of art."

When Woodbury retired, she had appeared in 81 films, though a newspaper article published in 1963 reported that she had appeared in more than 300 films. Woodbury eventually settled in Desert Hot Springs, California, where she was residing at the time of her death at the age of 73.

== Partial filmography ==
- Eight Girls in a Boat (1934) as School Girl (uncredited)
- The Count of Monte Cristo (1934) as Dancing Girl (uncredited)
- One Exciting Adventure (1934) as Girl
- Folies Bergère de Paris (1935) as Girl in Bar (uncredited)
- Bride of Frankenstein (1935) as Queen (uncredited)
- The Call of the Wild (1935) as Show Girl (uncredited)
- Harmony Lane (1935) as French Singer - 'Oh Susannah' (uncredited)
- The Eagle's Brood (1935) as Dolores (billed as Nana Martinez)
- The Fighting Coward (1935) as Marie Russell
- Bulldog Courage (1935) as Helen Brennan
- Dangerous Waters (1936) as Valparaiso Bar Girl - Facing Wall (uncredited)
- The Rogues Tavern (1936) as Gloria Robloff
- Anthony Adverse (1936) as Half-Caste Dancing Girl (uncredited)
- Song of the Gringo (1936) as Lolita Valle
- The Lion's Den (1936) as Ann Mervin
- Charlie Chan at the Opera (1936) as Dancer in Opera (uncredited)
- God's Country and the Woman (1937) as French Woman in Elevator (uncredited)
- Midnight Court (1937) as Chiquita
- Nobody's Baby (1937) as Replacement Dancer (uncredited)
- They Gave Him a Gun (1937) as Toto - French Girl (uncredited)
- There Goes My Girl (1937) as Margot Whitney
- Luck of Roaring Camp (1937) as Elsie
- Super-Sleuth (1937) as Doris Duane
- Forty Naughty Girls (1937) as Rita Marlowe
- Charlie Chan on Broadway (1937) as Marie Collins
- Living on Love (1937) as Edith Crumwell
- Crashing Hollywood (1938) as Barbara Lang
- Night Spot (1938) as Marge Dexter
- Algiers (1938) as Aicha
- Passport Husband (1938) as Conchita Montez
- Cipher Bureau (1938) as Therese Brahm
- Always in Trouble (1938) as Pearl Mussendorfer
- While New York Sleeps (1938) as Nora Parker
- Chasing Danger (1939) as Hazila
- Mystery of the White Room (1939)
- Barnyard Follies (1940) as Dolly
- Go West (1940) as Melody (uncredited)
- In Old Cheyenne (1941) as Della Casey aka Dolores Casino
- Ride on Vaquero (1941) as Dolores
- I'll Sell My Life (1941) as Valencia Duncan
- King of the Zombies (1941) as Barbara Winslow
- Paper Bullets (1941) as Rita Adams
- Two Latins from Manhattan (1941) as Lois Morgan
- I Killed That Man (1941) as Geri Reynolds
- Confessions of Boston Blackie (1941) as Mona
- Dr. Broadway (1942) as Margie Dove
- A Yank in Libya (1942) as Nancy Brooks-Graham
- Sunset Serenade (1942) as Vera Martin
- Phantom Killer (1942) as Barbara Mason
- The Living Ghost (1942) as Vera Martin
- Shut My Big Mouth (1942 as Maria
- The Hard Way (1943) as Maria (uncredited)
- You Can't Beat the Law (1943) as Amy Duncan
- The Desperadoes (1943) as Sundown
- Here Comes Kelly (1943) as Margie Burke
- The Whistler (1944) as Antoinette 'Toni' Vigran (uncredited)
- The Chinese Cat (1944) as Leah Manning
- Flame of the West (1945) as Poppy Rand
- Brenda Starr, Reporter (1945) as Brenda Starr
- Bring on the Girls (1945) as Gloria
- Ten Cents a Dance (1945) as Babe
- Northwest Trail (1945) as Katherine Owens
- Blue Skies (1946) as Flo (uncredited)
- The Arnelo Affair (1947) as Claire Lorrison
- Yankee Fakir (1947) as Mary Mason
- Here Comes Trouble (1948) as Bubbles LaRue
- Boston Blackie's Chinese Venture (1949) as Red, the Bar-Girl
- Come Next Spring (1956) as Melinda Little (uncredited)
- The Ten Commandments (1956) as Korah's Wife
- The Time Travelers (1964) as Gadra (final film role)

== Bibliography ==
- Wilcoxon, Henry; Orrison, Katherine (1991). Lionheart in Hollywood: the autobiography of Henry Wilcoxon. Metuchen, NJ and London: The Scarecrow Press, Inc. ISBN 0-8108-2476-0.
- Harris, Peter (ed.); Daynard, Don (1971). "Henry Wilcoxon" in The New Captain George's Whizzbang #13 (Vol.3 No.1). Toronto: Vast Whizzbang Organization.
