= Paul Fix =

American film and television character actor (1901–1983)

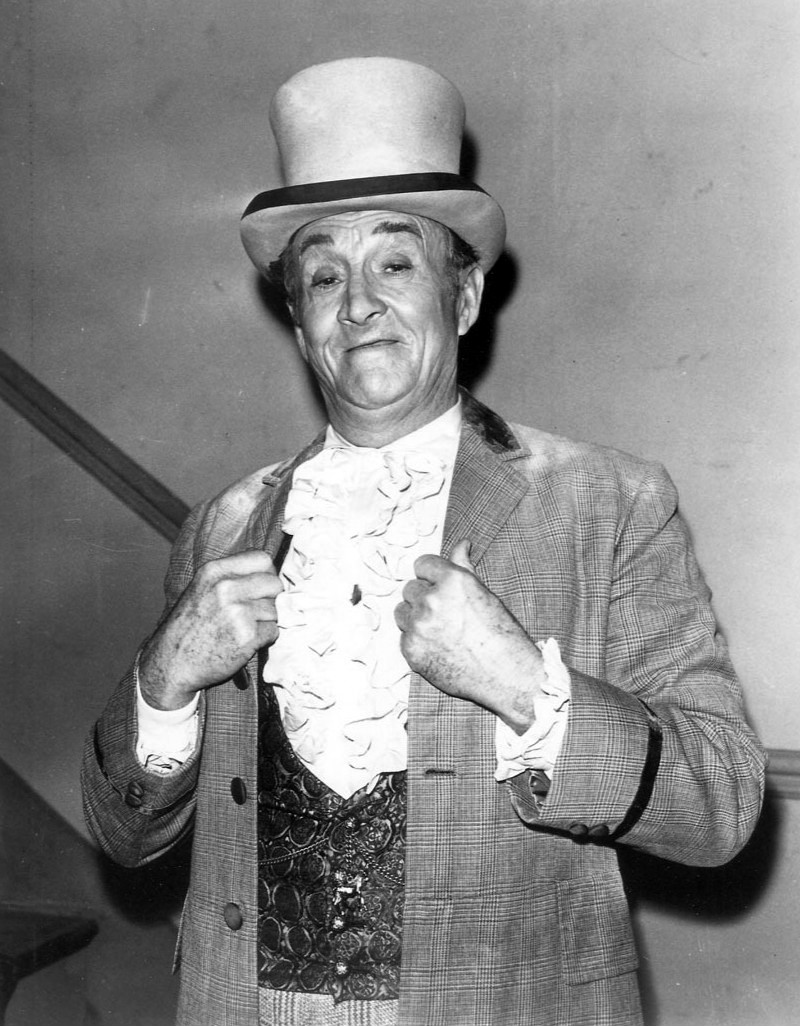
- Fix in a dual role in a 1962 episode of The Rifleman as "Charming Billy" Carraway
- Born: Peter Paul Fix; March 13, 1901; Dobbs Ferry, New York, U.S.
- Died: October 14, 1983 (aged 82); Los Angeles, California, U.S.
- Occupation: Actor
- Years active: 1925–1981
- Spouses: Frances Harvey (m. 1922; div. 1945) Beverly Pratt (m. 1949; died 1979)
- Children: 1
- Relatives: Harry Carey Jr. (son-in-law)

Peter Paul Fix (March 13, 1901 – October 14, 1983) was an American film and television character actor who was best known for his work in Westerns. Fix appeared in more than 100 movies and dozens of television shows over a 56-year career between 1925 and 1981. Fix portrayed Marshal Micah Torrance, opposite Chuck Connors's character in The Rifleman from 1958 to 1963. He later appeared with Connors in the 1966 Western film Ride Beyond Vengeance.

== Early life ==
Fix born to Wilhelm Fix and Louise Walz on March 13, 1901 in Dobbs Ferry, New York. His father was a brewer from Germany.

Following the United States' entry into World War I in April 1917, Fix joined the National Guard, initially serving in Peekskill, New York. After three months of duty there, he deserted and enlisted in the U.S. Army. After serving at Fort Slocum for three months, he again deserted and then enlisted in the U.S. Navy and was stationed in Providence, Rhode Island. While serving in the Navy, Fix was recruited to perform on stage in a Navy Relief Organization production of the comic opera H.M.S. Pinafore. Later, he served as a hospital corpsman aboard ships transporting American troops to and from Europe, and continued that assignment until he was officially discharged from military service on September 5, 1919.

== Stage and films ==
Following the war, Fix became a busy character actor, starting in local productions in New York. By the 1920s, he had moved to Hollywood, and in the 1930s, he became John Wayne's friend. He was Wayne's acting coach and eventually appeared as a featured player in many of Wayne's films.

Fix worked in early films such as Lucky Star (1929) with Janet Gaynor and Charles Farrell and Ladies Love Brutes (1930), and became a regular performer for the film's director, Frank Borzage, eight more times. Fix later appeared as Richard Bravo in The Bad Seed (1956), The Sea Chase (1955) and Giant (1956), portraying Elizabeth Taylor's father.

Fix appeared as the presiding judge in To Kill a Mockingbird (1962), as the sheriff in The Sons of Katie Elder (1965) and with Wayne in El Dorado (1966). In 1972, he was cast in the film Night of the Lepus, and the following year, he portrayed Pete Maxwell in Pat Garrett and Billy the Kid with James Coburn. In 1979, he appeared in Wanda Nevada. Fix cowrote the screenplay for Wayne's film Tall in the Saddle.

== Television ==
Fix had a recurring role as Marshal Micah Torrance on ABC's Western series The Rifleman, which was broadcast from 1958 to 1963.

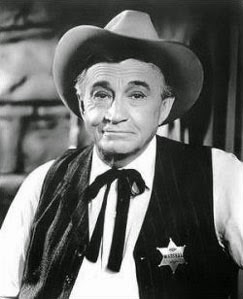
Fix in The Rifleman as his regular character in the series, Marshal Torrance.

On Christmas Day 1958, Fix appeared in the episode "Medal for Valor" on CBS's Dick Powell's Zane Grey Theatre. Fix plays a businessman who hires a desperate man to substitute for his son in the draft, later to interfere with the man's homesteading rights when it threatens his son's political aspirations.

Fix guest-starred on the short-lived detective series Meet McGraw, on Rory Calhoun's Western series The Texan on CBS and on John Payne's Western series The Restless Gun on NBC.

In 1957, Fix appeared as General Phil Sheridan in an episode of Tales of Wells Fargo with actor Dale Robertson, star of the series. Fix played the historical role of U.S. President Zachary Taylor in the 1960 episode "That Taylor Affair" of the NBC Western series, Riverboat, with Darren McGavin. Arlene Dahl was cast in this episode as Lucy Belle.

In 1961, Fix appeared as Ramsey Collins in the series finale, "Around the Dark Corner", of the NBC crime drama Dante. That same year, he played Dr. Abel in the episode "The Haven" on The DuPont Show with June Allyson. His other television credits include Adventures of Superman (1953–1954, with Anthony Caruso and Elisha Cook Jr.) and the adventure series, Northwest Passage.

Fix played Dr. Mark Piper in the second pilot episode of Star Trek, "Where No Man Has Gone Before". When the first season was filmed, his character was replaced by Leonard McCoy, played by DeForest Kelley.

Fix made five appearances as District Attorney Hale on Perry Mason (1957–1963), showing great skill as an examiner who did not ask objectionable questions unlike Hamilton Burger, who often experienced a judge's ire for asking leading questions. He guest-starred on such television series as Rawhide (1959), Wagon Train (1962), The Twilight Zone (1964), The F.B.I. (1965–1973), Voyage to the Bottom of the Sea (1966), The Time Tunnel (1966), The Wild Wild West (1966–1967), Gunsmoke (1967), Daniel Boone (1969), Owen Marshall: Counselor at Law (1971), The Rockford Files episode "The House on Willis Avenue" (as Joe Tooley), and two episodes of The Streets of San Francisco, one in 1973 and again in 1975, each a different character/storyline. He appeared on the NBC series Kentucky Jones (1964) as Judge Perkins in the episode "Spare the Rod". He played an aging suicidal novelist named Maxwell Hart on the Emergency! fourth-season episode "Kidding", where paramedic John Gage, played by Randolph Mantooth, was in charge of a small group of intellectual 10- and 11-year-old school children on a tour of Rampart General Hospital. In 1974, he made an appearance as an old friend of Steve Austin's in the TV series The Six Million Dollar Man in the episode "Population Zero". He also appeared as Kronus, a retired fleet commander on the original Battlestar Galactica.

Fix played the hardy pioneer James Briton "Brit" Bailey in the 1969 episode "Here Stands Bailey" of Death Valley Days.

== Personal life and death ==
In 1922 Fix married Frances Harvey, and the couple had one daughter. They divorced in 1945. He married his second wife, Beverly Pratt, on August 20, 1949. She died on November 13, 1979.

His daughter Marilyn married actor Harry Carey Jr., in 1944, and they had four children.

Fix died of kidney failure in Los Angeles at the age of 82. He is buried beside his second wife at Woodlawn Cemetery, Santa Monica.

== Selected filmography ==
- The Perfect Clown (1925) as Bellhop (uncredited)
- Hoodoo Ranch (1926)
- The First Kiss (1928) as Ezra Talbot
- Lucky Star (1929) as Joe
- Ladies Love Brutes (1930) as Slip
- Man Trouble (1930) as The Kid - A Gunman (uncredited)
- The Good Bad Girl (1931) as Roach
- The Fighting Sheriff (1931) as Jack Cameron
- Doctors' Wives as Interne (uncredited)
- The Avenger (1931) as Juan Marietta (uncredited)
- Sob Sister (1931) as Minor Role (uncredited)
- Bad Girl (1931)
- Young as You Feel (1931) as Desk Clerk (uncredited)
- Three Girls Lost (1931) as Tony Halcomb (uncredited)
- South of the Rio Grande (1932) as Juan Olivarez
- The Racing Strain (1932) as King Kelly
- Life Begins (1932) as Anxious Expectant Father (uncredited)
- The Last Mile (1932) as Eddie Werner - Cell 8
- Scarface (1932) as Hood with Gaffney (uncredited)
- Dancers in the Dark (1932) as Benny
- The Night of June 13 (1932) as Reporter (uncredited)
- Somewhere in Sonora (1933) as Bart Leadly
- The Important Witness (1933) as Tony
- Fargo Express (1933) as Mort Clark
- The Mad Game (1933) as Lou
- Devil's Mate (1933) as Malony
- The Avenger (1933) as Vickers
- The Important Witness (1933) as Tony
- The Sphinx (1933) as Dave Werner
- Emergency Call (1933) as Dr. Mason (uncredited)
- Zoo in Budapest (1933) as Heinie
- The Woman Who Dared (1933) as Racketeer
- Gun Law (1933) as Tony Adams
- The Westerner (1934) as Rustler Who Confesses (uncredited)
- The World Accuses (1934) as John Weymouth
- Rocky Rhodes (1934) as Joe Hilton
- The Count of Monte Cristo as Angry Citizen (uncredited)
- The Crosby Case (1934) as Engineer (uncredited)
- Little Man, What Now? (1934) as Lauderbock
- Reckless (1935) as Man on Mechanical Horse (uncredited)
- The Crimson Trail (1935) as Paul- Bellair Ranch Hand
- Mutiny Ahead (1935) as Teeter Smith
- His Fighting Blood (1935) as Phil Elliott
- Don't Bet on Blondes (1935) as Betting Man (uncredited)
- Men Without Names (1935) as The Kid
- Let 'Em Have It (1935) as Sam
- Millions in the Air (1935) as Hank - the Drunk
- Bar 20 Rides Again (1935) as Gila
- The Eagle's Brood (1935) as Henchman Steve
- Valley of Wanted Men (1935) as Mike Masters
- The Throwback (1935) as Spike Travis
- Bulldog Courage (1935) as Bailey
- The Desert Trail (1935) as Jim Whitmonlee
- Mariners of the Sky aka Navy Born (1936) as Joe Vezie
- The Road to Glory (1936) as Second Volunteer
- The Ex-Mrs. Bradford (1936) as Lou Pender (uncredited)
- The Bridge of Sighs (1936) as Harrison Courtney Jr. aka Harry West
- Phantom Patrol (1936) as Henchman Jo-Jo Regan
- Yellowstone (1936) a Dynomite
- Straight from the Shoulder (1936) as Trigger Benson
- Charlie Chan at the Race Track (1936) as Lefty (uncredited)
- 36 Hours to Kill (1936) as Gangster (uncredited)
- The Prisoner of Shark Island (1936) as David Herold
- After the Thin Man (1936) as Phil Brynes
- Wanted! Jane Turner (1936) as Crowley's Henchman
- The Accusing Finger (1936) as John 'Twitchy' Burke
- 15 Maiden Lane (1936) as Agitator (uncredited)
- Two in a Crowd (1936) as Bonelli's Henchman
- Winterset (1936) as Joe
- The Plot Thickens (1936) as Joe
- Border Cafe (1937) as 'Doley' Dolson
- Armored Car (1937) as Slim
- Her Husband Lies (1937) as Lefty Harker (uncredited)
- Woman in Distress (1937) as Joe Emory
- The Game That Kills (1937) as Dick Adams
- Big City (1937) as Comet Night Watchman (uncredited)
- On Such a Night (1937) as Maxie Barnes
- Souls at Sea (1937) as Violinest
- King of Gamblers (1937) as Charlie
- It Can't Last Forever (1937) as Mikey (uncredited)
- Paid to Dance (1937) as Nifty
- Daughter of Shanghai (1937) as Miles (uncredited)
- Mannequin (1937) as Smooch Hanrahan (uncredited)
- Conquest (1937) as Dumb Soldier (uncredited)
- Hot Water (1937) as Homer (uncredited)
- The Saint of New York (1938) as Phil Farrell - Doorman at the Silverclub (uncredited)
- Mr. Moto's Gamble (1938) as Gangster (uncredited)
- Smashing the Rackets (1938) as Maxie
- The Crowd Roars (1938) as Joe - Bodyguard on Plane (uncredited)
- Crime Ring (1938) as Slim (uncredited)
- Penitentiary (1938) as Bunch (uncredited)
- King of Alcatraz (1938) as 'Nails' Miller
- The Night Hawk (1938) as Spider
- Mr. Moto's Gamble (1938) as Gangster (uncredited)
- Crime Takes a Holiday (1938) as Louie
- Secrets of a Nurse (1938) as Smiley, Largo's Gunman (uncredited)
- When G-Men Step In (1938) as Clip Phillips - Fred's Henchman
- Walking Down Broadway (1938) as Man in Baccarat Club Bar (uncredited)
- The Buccaneer (1938) as Dying Pirate
- Behind Prison Gates (1939) as Convict Petey Ryan
- They All Come Out (1939) as Vonnie (uncredited)
- News Is Made at Night (1939) as Joe Luddy
- Heritage of the Desert (1939) as Henchman Chick Chance
- Star Reporter (1939) as Clipper
- Two Thoroughbreds (1939) as Stablemaster
- Heroes in Blue (1939) as Henchman (uncredited)
- Those High Grey Walls (1939) as Nightengale
- Mutiny on the Blackhawk (1939) as Jock - the Sailor
- The Girl and the Gambler (1939) as Charlie
- Undercover Doctor (1939) as Monk Jackson
- Code of the Streets (1939) as Tommy Shay
- Almost a Gentleman (1939) as Kidnapper (uncredited)
- Disbarred (1939) as Stone (uncredited)
- The Ghost Breakers (1940) as Frenchy Duval
- Glamour for Sale (1940) as Louis Manell
- Queen of the Mob (1940) as Gang Leader in Garage (uncredited)
- The Fargo Kid (1940) as Deuce Mallory
- The Great Plane Robbery (1940) as Nick Harmon
- Trail of the Vigilantes (1940) as Lefty
- Triple Justice (1940) as Fred Cleary
- Black Diamonds (1940) as Matthews
- The Crooked Road (1940) as Nick Romero
- Dr. Cyclops (1940) as Dr. Mendoza
- Virginia City (1940) as Murrell's Henchman (uncredited)
- Outside the Three-Mile Limit (1940) as Bill Swanson
- Strange Cargo (1940) as Benet
- Black Friday (1940) as William Kane
- Down Mexico Way (1941) as Henchman Davis
- A Missouri Outlaw (1941) as Mark Roberts
- Public Enemies (1941) as Scat
- Mob Town (1941) as Monk Bangor (uncredited)
- Unfinished Business (1941) as Reporter (uncredited)
- Hold That Ghost (1941) as Lefty (uncredited)
- Citadel of Crime (1941) as Nick Garro
- Roar of the Press (1941) as 'Sparrow' McGraun
- Pittsburgh (1942) as Mine Operator
- Escape from Crime (1942) as Dude Mevill
- Hitler – Dead or Alive (1942) as Joe 'The Book' Conway
- Youth on Parade (1942) as Nick Cramer (uncredited)
- Highways by Night (1942) as Gabby
- Mug Town (1942) as Marco
- That Other Woman (1942) as Tough Guy
- Dr. Gillespie's New Assistant (1942) as Husband (uncredited)
- Kid Glove Killer (1942) as Allison Stacy (uncredited)
- Alias Boston Blackie (1942) as Steve Cavereni
- Sleepytime Gal (1942) as Johnny Gatto
- South of Santa Fe (1942) as Joe Keenan aka Harmon
- Jail House Blues (1942) as Danny
- Captive Wild Woman (1943) as Gruen
- Sherlock Holmes and the Secret Weapon (1943) as Mueller (uncredited)
- In Old Oklahoma (1943) as Cherokee Kid
- Petticoat Larceny (1943) as Louie (uncredited)
- Bombardier (1943) as Big Guy - Spy (uncredited)
- The Unknown Guest (1943) as Fain
- The Fighting Seabees (1944) as Ding
- Tall in the Saddle (1944) as Bob Clews (also co-writer)
- Back to Bataan (1945) as Bindle Jackson
- Grissly's Millions (1945) as Lewis Bentley
- Flame of Barbary Coast (1945) as Calico Jim
- Dakota (1945) as Carp
- Tycoon (1947) as Joe
- Angel and the Badman (1947) as Mouse Marr (uncredited)
- Force of Evil (1948) as Bill Ficco
- The Plunderers (1948) as Calico
- Angel in Exile (1948) as Carl Spitz
- Red River (1948) as Teeler Yaces
- Wake of the Red Witch (1948) as Antonio "Ripper" Arrezo
- The Fighting Kentuckian (1949) as Beau Merritt
- She Wore a Yellow Ribbon (1949) as Gunrunner (uncredited)
- Fighting Man of the Plains (1949) as Yancy
- Hellfire (1949) as Dusty Stoner
- California Passage (1950) as Whalen
- Surrender (1950) as Deputy Williams
- Bullfighter and the Lady (1951) as Joseph Jamison (uncredited)
- Warpath (1951) as Pvt. Fiore
- The Great Missouri Raid (1951) as Sgt. Brill
- Ride the Man Down (1952) as Ray Cavanaugh
- What Price Glory (1952) as Gowdy (uncredited)
- Denver and Rio Grande (1952) as Engineer Moynihan
- Big Jim Mclain (1952) as Voice of Chauncey (uncredited)
- Fair Wind to Java (1953) as Wilson
- Island in the Sky (1953) as Wally Miller
- Hondo (1953) as Major Sherry
- Devil's Canyon (1953) as Gatling Guard
- Star of Texas (1953) as Luke Andrews
- The High and the Mighty (1954) as Frank Briscoe
- Johnny Guitar (1954) as Eddie
- Blood Alley (1955) as Mr. Tso
- The Sea Chase (1955) as Max Heinz
- Top of the World (1955) as Maj. George French
- Santiago (1956) as Trasker
- Star in the Dust (1956) as Mike MacNamara
- Stagecoach to Fury (1956) as Tim O'Connors
- Giant (1956) as Dr. Horace Lynnton
- Toward the Unknown (1956) as Lt. Gen. Bryan Shelby
- The Bad Seed (1956) as Richard Bravo
- Man in the Vault (1956) as Herbie
- Man in the Shadow (1957) as Herb Parker
- The Devil's Hairpin (1957) as Doc Addams
- Night Passage (1957) as Mr. Feeney
- Jet Pilot (1957) as Major Rexford
- Night Passage (1957) as Clarence Feeney
- Lafayette Escadrille (1958) as U. S. General
- The Notorious Mr. Monks (1958) as Benjamin Monks
- Guns Girls and Gangsters (1959) as Lon Largo
- Wagon Train : The Amos Billings Story (1962, TV Series) as Amos Billings
- To Kill A Mockingbird (1962) as Judge Taylor
- The Outrage (1964) as Indian
- Mail Order Bride (1964) as Sheriff Jess Linley
- The Sons of Katie Elder (1965) as Sheriff Billy Watson
- Shenandoah (1965) as Dr. Tom Witherspoon
- Baby the Rain Must Fall (1965) as Judge Ewing
- El Dorado (1966) as Dr. Miller
- Incident at Phantom Hill (1966) as General Hood
- Ride Beyond Vengeance (1966) as Hanley
- An Eye for an Eye (1966) as Brien Quince
- Nevada Smith (1966) as Sheriff Bonnell
- Welcome to Hard Times (1967) as Major Munn C.S.A.
- The Ballad of Josie (1967) as Alpheus Minisk
- Day of the Evil Gun (1968) as Sheriff Kelso
- Hellfighters (1968) as Dusty Stoner
- The Undefeated (1969) as General Joe Masters
- Young Billy Young (1969) as Charlie
- Secrets of the Pirate's Inn (1969) as Vern Padgett
- Dirty Dingus Magee (1970) as Chief Crazy Blanket
- Zabriskie Point (1970) as Roadhouse Owner
- Shoot Out (1971) as Brakeman Frenatore
- Something Big (1971) as Chief Yellow Sun
- Night of the Lepus (1972) as Sheriff Cody
- Pat Garrett and Billy The Kid (1973) as Maxwell
- Cahill U.S. Marshal (1973) as Old Man
- Grayeagle (1977) as Running Wolf
- Wanda Nevada (1979) as Texas Curly

== Film writer ==
- Tall in the Saddle (Screenplay)
- Ring of Fear (Original Screenplay)

== Television ==
- The Lone Ranger – episode – Million Dollar Wallpaper – Silk (1950)
- Adventures of Superman (Credits Paul Fix) – Episode Season 1 Episode 22 – Czar of the Underworld (1953)
- Adventures of Superman (Credits Peter Fix) – Episode Season 2 Episode 18 – Semi-Private Eye (1954)
- Gunsmoke - season 2, episode "Cholera" (1956)
- Perry Mason – episode - The Case of the Angry Mourner - District Attorney Hale (1957)
- The Restless Gun - episode - Jody - as Jake Burnett (1957)
- The Rifleman – 123 episodes appeared in, and credit only for 27 episodes – Marshall Micah Torrance, and Charming Billy for 1 episode (1958–1963)
- Wagon Train – episode – The Mark Hanford Story – Jake (1958)
- Perry Mason – Season 2 Episode 6 - The Case of the Buried Clock - District Attorney Hale (1958)
- Wagon Train – episode – The Amos Billings Story – Amos Billings (1962)
- Wagon Train – episode – The Brian Conlin Story – Sean Bannon (1964)
- Lassie – episode – The Sulky Race – Sam Snow (1959)
- Perry Mason – episode - The Case of the Potted Planter - District Attorney Hale (1963)
- Ripcord – episode – Jump to a Blind Alley – Josh Parker (1963)
- The Twilight Zone – Colbey (1964) – Episode Season 5 Episode 26 – "I Am the Night Color Me Black"
- The F.B.I. – episode – How to Murder an Iron Horse – Willard Oberley (1965)
- Death Valley Days – episode – A Picture of a Lady – Doc Lathrop, with Peter Whitney as Judge Roy Bean and Francine York as Lily Langtry (1965)
- Star Trek: The Original Series (1966) – Dr. Mark Piper in S1:E3, "Where No Man Has Gone Before"
- Daniel Boone – Quonab - S3/E2 "The Allegiances" (1966)
- A Man Called Shenandoah – episode – Plunder – Sam Winters (1966)
- The Wild Wild West - episode - Night of the green terror - Old Chief (1966)
- Voyage to the Bottom of the Sea - S3/E5 - The Terrible Toys - Burke (1966)
- Bonanza – episode – The Gold Detector – Barney (1967)
- Gunsmoke - episode - Fandango - Doc Lacey (1967)
- Gunsmoke – episode – Vengeance Part 1 – Sheriff Sloan (1967)
- The Big Valley – episode – The Stallion – Brahma (1967)
- The Guns of Will Sonnett – episode #1 – Ride the Long Trail – Olenhaussen - Stableman (1967)
- The Wild Wild West - S3 E7 "The Night of the Hangman" - Judge Blake (1967)
- Land of the Giants – episode #9 "The Creed" Doctor Brule (1968)
- Land of the Giants – episode #17 "Deadly Lodestone" Doctor Brule (1969)
- The Andy Griffith Show – episode – Barney Hosts a Summit Meeting – Mr. McCabe (1968)
- Daniel Boone (1964 TV series) – Chief Great Bear - S5/E16 "Three Score and Ten" (1969)
- The F.B.I. – episode – The Prey – Chester Cranford (1969)
- Death Valley Days season 17 episode 18 Here Stands Bailey - Brit Bailey (1969)
- The F.B.I. – episode – Incident in the Desert – Matt Williams (1970)
- Ironside – episode – The Laying on of Handy – Cripple (1970)
- Alias Smith and Jones – episode – The Day They Hanged Kid Curry – Tom Hansen (1971)
- Owen Marshall: Counselor at Law – episode – Make No Mistake – Dr. Mel Woodruff (1971)
- Alias Smith and Jones – episode – Night of the Red Dog – Clarence Bowles (1971)
- Bonanza – episode – For a Young Lady – Bufford Sturgis (1971)
- Mannix – episode – Scapegoat – Johnny Gunnarson (1972)
- Emergency! – episode – Fuzz Lady – Gus 'Pop' William (1972)
- Alias Smith and Jones – episode – Three to a Bed – Bronc (1973)
- The F.B.I. – episode – The Big Job – G.G. Farrell (1973)
- The Six Million Dollar Man – episode – Population: Zero – Joe Taylor (1974)
- Barnaby Jones – episode – Dark Legacy – Amos Barringer (1974)
- Doc Elliot – episode – The Pharmacist – Gus Turners (1974)
- The Waltons - episode - The Conflict - Senator Lucas Avery (1974)
- Barnaby Jones – episode – Death on Deposit – Alfred Stermer (1974)
- Barnaby Jones – episode – Double Vengeance – Jack Tatthal (1975)
- Emergency! – episode – Kidding – Maxwell Hart (1975)
- Lincoln – mini-series – episode – Prairie Law – Judge Thomas (1975)
- Ellery Queen – episode – The Adventure of the Sinister Scenario – Captain Benjamin Blake (1976)
- How The West Was Won – Mini series – episodes #1.2–1.4 – Portagee (1977–1978)
- The Rockford Files – episode – The House On Willis Avenue – Joseph Tooley (1978)
- Battlestar Galactica – episode – Take The Celestra – Commander Kronus (1979)
- Quincy M.E. – episode – For Want of A Horse – Jason Randall (1981) (final appearance)
