= Ralph Oberg =

American art director

- Born: August 27, 1899; California, United States
- Died: February 15, 1961 (aged 61); Los Angeles, California; United States
- Occupation: Art director
- Years active: 1931–1959 (film)

Ralph Oberg (1899–1961) was an American art director.

== Selected filmography ==
- Curtain at Eight (1933)
- The Sin of Nora Moran (1933)
- Unknown Blonde (1934)
- Down Mexico Way (1941)
- Bells of Capistrano (1942)
- The Lawless Eighties (1957)
- The Last Stagecoach West (1957)
- Taming Sutton's Gal (1957)
- Gunfire at Indian Gap (1957)

== Bibliography ==
- Pitts, Michael R. Poverty Row Studios, 1929-1940. McFarland, 2005.
