= Chasing Danger =

1939 film by Ricardo Cortez

- Directed by: Ricardo Cortez
- Screenplay by: Robert Ellis; Helen Logan
- Story by: Leonardo Bercovici
- Produced by: Sol M. Wurtzel
- Starring: Preston Foster; Lynn Bari; Wally Vernon; Henry Wilcoxon; Joan Woodbury; Harold Huber
- Cinematography: Virgil Miller
- Edited by: Norman Colbert
- Production company: 20th Century Fox
- Distributed by: 20th Century Fox
- Release date: May 5, 1939
- Running time: 60 minutes
- Country: United States
- Language: English

Chasing Danger is a 1939 American adventure film directed by Ricardo Cortez and written by Robert Ellis and Helen Logan. The film stars Preston Foster, Lynn Bari, Wally Vernon, Henry Wilcoxon, Joan Woodbury and Harold Huber. The film was released on May 5, 1939, by 20th Century Fox.

== Cast ==
- Preston Foster as Steve Mitchell
- Lynn Bari as Renée Claire
- Wally Vernon as Waldo Winkle
- Henry Wilcoxon as Captain Andre Duvac
- Joan Woodbury as Hazila
- Harold Huber as Carlos Demitri
- Roy D'Arcy as Corbin
- Stanley Fields as Captain of the S.S. Fontaine
- Pedro de Cordoba as Gurra Din
- Jody Gilbert as The Veiled Girl
