= The Eagle's Brood =

1935 film by Howard Bretherton

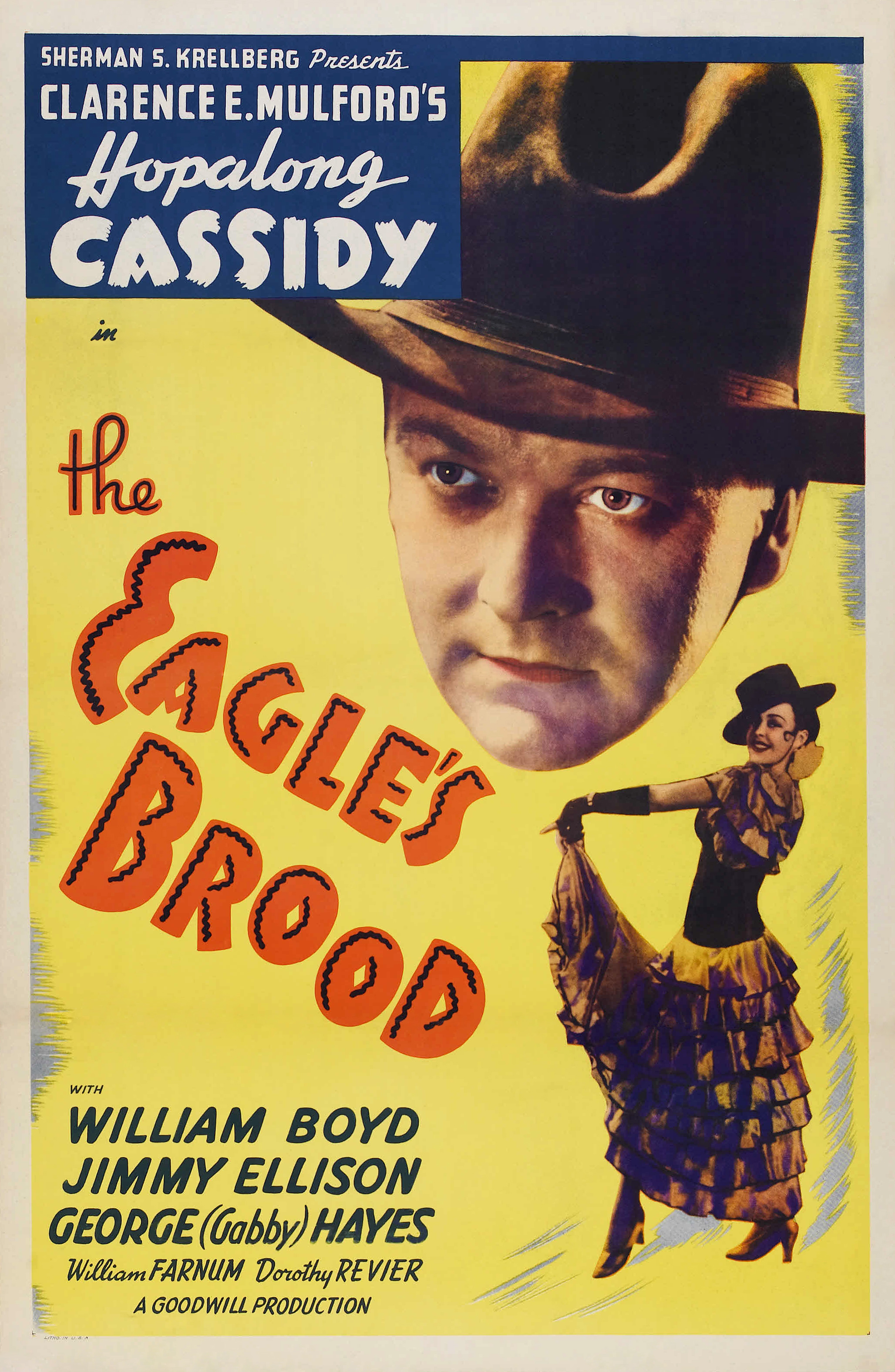
- Theatrical release poster
- Directed by: Howard Bretherton
- Screenplay by: Doris Schroeder; Harrison Jacobs
- Based on: Hopalong Cassidy and the Eagles Brood; 1931 novel by Clarence E. Mulford
- Produced by: Harry Sherman
- Starring: William Boyd; James Ellison; William Farnum; George "Gabby" Hayes; Addison Richards; Nana Martinez; Frank Shannon
- Cinematography: Archie Stout
- Edited by: Edward Schroeder
- Production company: Paramount Pictures
- Distributed by: Paramount Pictures
- Release date: October 25, 1935
- Running time: 61 minutes
- Country: United States
- Language: English

The Eagle's Brood is a 1935 American Western film directed by Howard Bretherton and written by Doris Schroeder and Harrison Jacobs. The film stars William Boyd, James Ellison, William Farnum, George "Gabby" Hayes, Addison Richards, Nana Martinez and Frank Shannon. The film was released on October 25, 1935, by Paramount Pictures.

== Plot ==
El Toro the outlaw saves Hoppy's life, so Hoppy agrees to help find his missing grandson.

== Cast ==
- William Boyd as Bill Hop-Along Cassidy
- James Ellison as Johnny Nelson
- William Farnum as El Toro
- George "Gabby" Hayes as Bartender Spike
- Addison Richards as Big Henry
- Nana Martinez as Dolores
- Frank Shannon as Henchman Mike
- Dorothy Revier as Dolly
- Paul Fix as Henchman Steve
- Al Lydell as Panhandle
- John Merton as Henchman Ed
- George Mari as Pablo Chavez
- Juan Torena as Esteban
- Henry Sylvester as Sheriff
