= David Silverstein =

American screenwriter

- Born: January 13, 1896; Pittsburgh, Pennsylvania
- Died: July 6, 1944 (aged 48); Staten Island, New York
- Occupation(s): Screenwriter, actor

David Silverstein (January 13, 1896 – July 6, 1944) was an American screenwriter and journalist who worked at MGM, Universal, and Columbia in the 1930s and 1940s.

== Biography ==
Silverstein was born in Pittsburgh, Pennsylvania, to Nathan Silverstein and Minnie Grobstein. His parents were Jewish Russian immigrants.

Silverstein served in the military during World War I, and he worked as a journalist before beginning his career in Hollywood. His first credit as a scenario writer came in 1932 with the release of Hatta Marri. He would go on to write 24 films over the course of his career.

Silverstein joined the Army Signal Corps during World War II in 1941; he joined other Columbia scenarists in writing training films at the Film Lab in Fort Monmouth, New Jersey. He died of injuries received in action in 1944, and was awarded a Purple Heart posthumously. He was survived by his wife, Alice, and their son.

== Selected filmography ==
- Career Girl (1944)
- Sabotage Squad (1942)
- I Killed That Man (1941)
- The Kid from Kansas (1941)
- Mystery Ship (1941)
- Melody and Moonlight (1940)
- Should a Girl Marry? (1939)
- Almost a Gentleman (1939)
- Saturday's Heroes (1937)
- You Can't Beat Love (1937)
- 15 Maiden Lane (1936)
- Ticket to Paradise (1936)
- Dancing Feet (1936)
- Streamline Express (1935)
- Woman Wanted (1935)
- The Scarlet Letter (1934)
- King Kelly of the U.S.A. (1934)
- Manhattan Love Song (1934)
- Unknown Blonde (1934)
- The Devil's Mate (1933)
