= One Exciting Adventure =

1934 film

- Directed by: Ernst L. Frank
- Written by: Franz Schulz; Billy Wilder; William Hurlbut; William B. Jutte; Samuel Ornitz; Milton Carruth; Ernst L. Frank
- Produced by: Ernst L. Frank; Henry Henigson
- Starring: Binnie Barnes; Neil Hamilton; Paul Cavanagh
- Cinematography: Norbert Brodine
- Edited by: Murray Seldeen
- Music by: Heinz Roemheld
- Production company: Universal Pictures
- Distributed by: Universal Pictures
- Release date: September 1, 1934
- Running time: 70 minutes
- Country: United States
- Language: English

One Exciting Adventure is a 1934 American comedy film directed by Ernst L. Frank and starring Binnie Barnes, Neil Hamilton and Paul Cavanagh. It is a remake of the 1933 German film What Women Dream.

== Cast ==
- Binnie Barnes as Rena Sorel
- Neil Hamilton as Walter Stone
- Paul Cavanagh as Lavassor
- Grant Mitchell as Fussli
- Eugene Pallette as Kleinsilber
- Ferdinand Gottschalk as Jeweler
- Henry Kolker as Customer
- Doris Lloyd as Customer
- Dick Winslow as Boy
- Edward Keane as Hotel manager
- G. P. Huntley as Man
- William Worthington as Man
- Dorothy Christy as Woman with Earrings
- Edward McWade as Grouchy Man
- Bess Flowers as Woman
- Ann Doran as Girl
- Joan Woodbury as Girl
- Phyllis Brooks as Minor role

== Bibliography ==
- Goble, Alan. The Complete Index to Literary Sources in Film. Walter de Gruyter, 1999.
