= Unknown Blonde =

1934 film

- Directed by: Hobart Henley
- Written by: Leonard Fields; David Silverstein
- Based on: Collusion by Theodore D. Irwin
- Produced by: Larry Darmour; Phil Goldstone
- Starring: Edward Arnold; Barbara Barondess; Dorothy Revier
- Cinematography: Ira H. Morgan
- Edited by: Otis Garrett
- Production company: Larry Darmour Productions
- Distributed by: Majestic Pictures
- Release date: April 23, 1934
- Running time: 67 minutes
- Country: United States
- Language: English

Unknown Blonde is a 1934 American pre-Code crime drama film directed by Hobart Henley and starring Edward Arnold, Barbara Barondess and Dorothy Revier. It was released by the independent Majestic Pictures. It was based on the 1932 novel Collusion by Theodore D. Irwin. The film's sets were designed by the art director Ralph Oberg.

== Plot ==
Frank Rodie emerges as a very successful divorce lawyer, embittered after his own wife tricks him into innocently appearing as a co-respondent in a case and then divorcing him so she could marry a wealthy stockbroker. His wife turns their daughter Judith against him and, now with her husband in financial difficulties, she is spending money that Frank sends for their daughter. He manages to get even by trapping his wife into a compromising situation after her husband sues for divorce. Finally, Frank is called in to save his daughter's reputation when she is dragged into a divorce case, eventually winning her appreciation.

== Cast ==
- Edward Arnold as Frank Rodie
- Barbara Barondess as Mrs. Van Brunt Jr.
- Barry Norton as Bob Parker
- John Miljan as Frank Wilson
- Dorothy Revier as Helen Rodie
- Leila Bennett as The Maid
- Walter Catlett as Publicity Man
- Helen Jerome Eddy as Miss Adams
- Claude Gillingwater as Papa Van Brunt Sr.
- Arletta Duncan as Judith Rodie
- Maidel Turner as Mrs Parker
- Franklin Pangborn as Male Co-Respondent
- Esther Muir as Mrs. Vail
- Clarence Wilson as Max Keibel
- Arthur Hoyt as Mr. Vail
- Franklyn Ardell as Rodie's Lawyer
- Kernan Cripps as Detective
- Henry Hall as Judge

== Bibliography ==
- Pitts, Michael R. Poverty Row Studios, 1929–1940: An Illustrated History of 55 Independent Film Companies, with a Filmography for Each. McFarland & Company, 2005.
