= Bulldog Courage (1935 film) =

1935 film

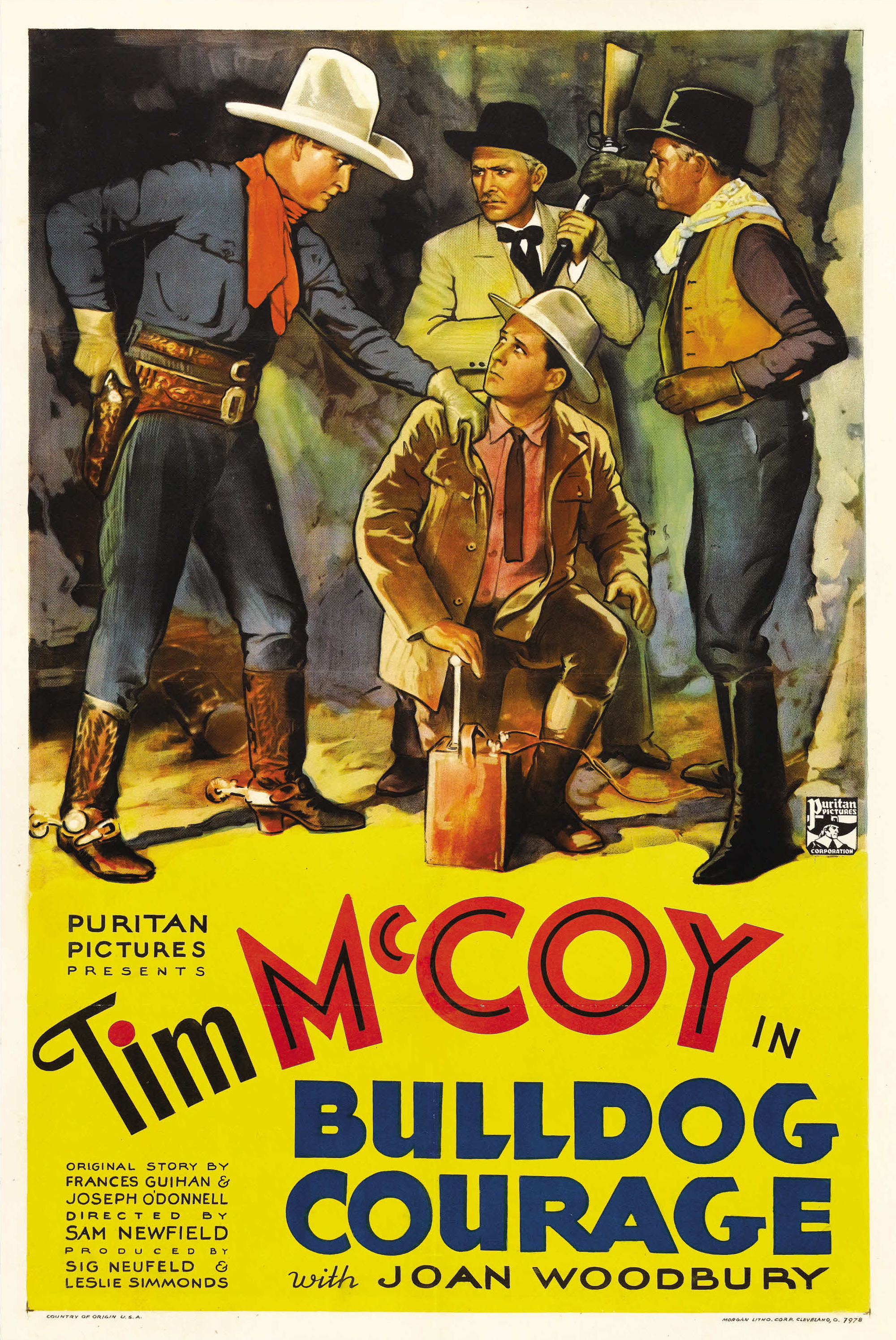
- Theatrical release poster
- Directed by: Sam Newfield
- Written by: Frances Guihan (screenplay); Joseph O'Donnell (screenplay)
- Produced by: Sigmund Neufeld; Leslie Simmonds
- Cinematography: Jack Greenhalgh
- Edited by: S. Roy Luby
- Music by: Oliver Wallace
- Distributed by: Puritan Pictures
- Release date: December 30, 1935
- Running time: 60 minutes
- Country: United States
- Language: English

Bulldog Courage is a 1935 American Western film directed by Sam Newfield, and produced by Sigmund Neufeld for Puritan Pictures.

== Plot ==
When the rich and powerful Mr. Williams seizes Slim Braddock's mine through the courts, Pete is unable to afford a legal defence or appeal. He takes matters into his own hands by robbing the proceeds of his mine from Williams until he is fatally shot by a sheriff's posse but his last words are that Williams will have another Braddock to contend with.

Slim's son Tim rides into town to also take the law into his own hands to help the impoverished locals in keeping their lucrative mines.

== Cast ==
- Tim McCoy as Slim Braddock / Tim Braddock
- Joan Woodbury as Helen Brennan
- Paul Fix as Bailey
- Eddie Buzard as Tim as a boy
- John Cowell as Pete Brennan
- Karl Hackett as Williams
- John Elliott as Judge Charley Miller
- Edmund Cobb as Cal Jepson
- Edward Hearn as Henchman Clayton
- Jack Rockwell as Sheriff Pendleton
