= Devil's Mate =

1933 film

- Directed by: Phil Rosen
- Written by: Leonard Fields; David Silverstein
- Produced by: Ben Verschleiser
- Starring: Mary Brian; Bruce Cabot; Grant Mitchell
- Cinematography: Gilbert Warrenton
- Edited by: Doane Harrison; Carl Pierson
- Production company: Monogram Pictures
- Release date: August 20, 1933 (US)
- Running time: 68 minutes
- Country: United States
- Language: English

The Devil's Mate is a 1933 American pre-Code mystery film directed by Phil Rosen, starring Peggy Shannon and Preston Foster.

It was remade by Rosen as I Killed That Man (1941).

== Plot ==
As murderer Maloney is being executed in the electric chair, he's willing to expose an underworld mob boss. He is killed by a poison dart before he can tell anything. Inspector O'Brien suspects McGhee, a ward healer and friend of Maloney; Parkhurst, a scholar, philanthropist, and candidate for the prison board; Clinton, a friend of Parkhurst; or Natural, a reporter for the "Chronicle" newspaper. Since McGhee is a nonsmoker and found in possession of an empty cigarette case, he is arrested.

== Cast ==
- Peggy Shannon as Nancy Weaver
- Preston Foster as Inspector O'Brien
- Ray Walker as Natural
- Hobart Cavanaugh as Parkhurst
- Barbara Barondess as Gwen
- Paul Porcasi as Nick
- Harold Waldridge as Joe
- Jason Robards Sr. as Clinton
- Bryant Washburn as District Attorney
- Harry Holman as McGee
- George 'Gabby' Hayes as Collins
- James Durkin as Warden
- Gordon De Main as Butler
- Paul Fix as Maloney
