= Prairie Roundup =

1951 film by Fred F. Sears

- Directed by: Fred F. Sears
- Written by: Joseph O'Donnell
- Produced by: Colbert Clark
- Starring: Charles Starrett; Mary Castle; Frank Fenton
- Cinematography: Fayte M. Browne
- Edited by: Paul Borofsky
- Music by: Mischa Bakaleinikoff
- Production company: Columbia Pictures
- Distributed by: Columbia Pictures
- Release date: January 15, 1951
- Running time: 55 minutes
- Country: United States
- Language: English

Prairie Roundup is a 1951 American Western film directed by Fred F. Sears and starring Charles Starrett, Mary Castle and Frank Fenton. It is the 52nd of 65 films in the Durango Kid series.

== Cast ==
- Charles Starrett as Steve Carson / The Durango Kid
- Mary Castle as Toni Eaton
- Frank Fenton as Buck Prescott
- The Sunshine Boys as Singing Cowhands
- Smiley Burnette as Smiley Burnette
- Lane Chandler as Red Dawson

== Bibliography ==
- Blottner, Gene. Columbia Pictures Movie Series, 1926-1955: The Harry Cohn Years. McFarland, 2011.
