= Barbara Barondess =

American actress (1907–2000)

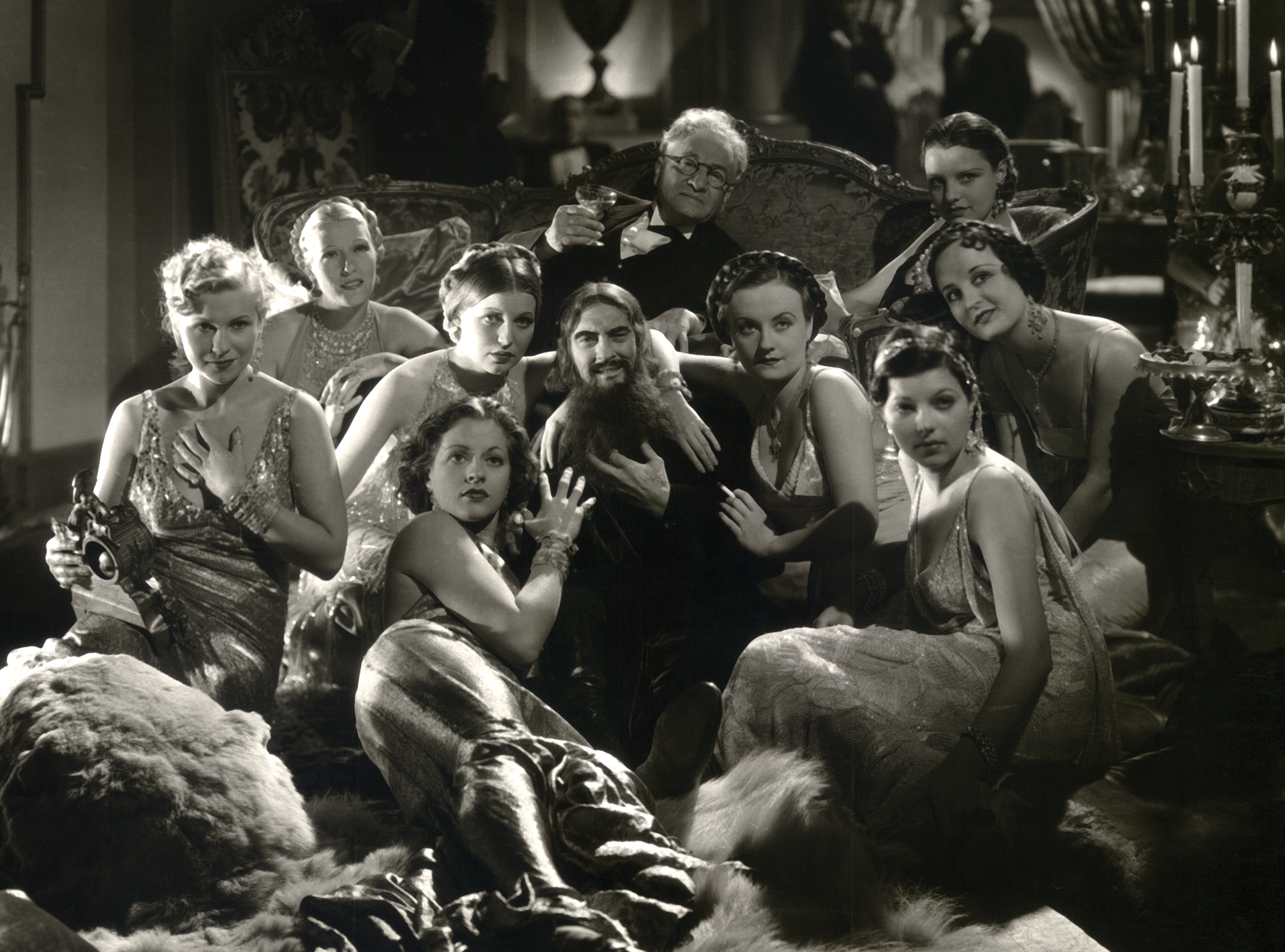
- Barbara Barondess as far left photo in "Rasputin and the Empress" in 1932.
- Born: Barbara McLean Barondess; August 4, 1907; Brooklyn, New York, U.S.
- Died: May 31, 2000 (aged 92); New York City, New York, U.S.
- Occupation: Actress
- Years active: 1925–1940 (film)

Barbara McLean Barondess (July 4, 1907 – May 31, 2000) was an American stage and film actress.

Barondess was born in New York City, but her family returned to Russia because of the luxury that life held for them there. Her uncle was a lumber magnate in Ukraine. By 1921, however, they left Russia to escape "anarchy and death". The family went from Russia to England and traveled in steerage from there to the United States with their jewels sewn into their underwear. Barondess was 14 years old when the family arrived at Ellis Island.

After Barondess left acting she became a dress designer, an interior decorator, and "a broker of fine arts and antiques". Clients for her interior design work included "many prominent motion picture personalities", and she created a room for the 10th Annual National Home-Furnishings Show in 1959.

On October 24, 1933, Barondess filed for divorce from producer Irving Jacobs after four years of marriage. She was married to the actor Douglas MacLean from 1938 to 1946. On May 28, 1953, she obtained a divorce from attorney Nathaniel S. Ruvell. Later in the 1950s she was married to Leonard J. Knaster.

Barondess founded the Barbara Barondess Theatre Lab Alliance in 1981 as a way to help performing arts professionals who were struggling and worked with it for 17 years. She wrote a memoir, One Life Is Not Enough (Communications Creativity, 1990).

Barondess died of cardiac arrest in New York City on May 31, 2000.

== Selected filmography ==
- The Reckless Lady (1926)
- Summer Bachelors (1926)
- Rasputin and the Empress (1932)
- Hold Your Man (1933)
- Devil's Mate (1933)
- Luxury Liner (1933)
- Soldiers of the Storm (1933)
- Queen Christina (1933)
- When Strangers Marry (1933)
- Eight Girls in a Boat (1934)
- The Pursuit of Happiness (1934)
- Change of Heart (1934)
- Beggar's Holiday (1934)
- The Fountain (1934)
- Unknown Blonde (1934)
- Diamond Jim (1935)
- People Will Talk (1935)
- Life Begins at 40 (1935)
- A Tale of Two Cities (1935)
- Lady Be Careful (1936)
- Easy Money (1936)
- The Plot Thickens (1936)
- Make a Wish (1937)
- Fit for a King (1937)
- Emergency Squad (1940)

== Bibliography ==
- Fleming E. J. Paul Bern: The Life and Famous Death of the MGM Director and Husband of Harlow. McFarland, 2009.
- Pitts, Michael R. Poverty Row Studios, 1929–1940: An Illustrated History of 55 Independent Film Companies, with a Filmography for Each. McFarland & Company, 2005.
