= Stories of the Century =

American Western television series (1954–1955)

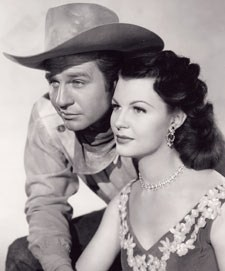
- Jim Davis and Mary Castle
- Genre: Western
- Written by: Maurice Tombragel; Joe Richardson; Milton Raison; Budd Lesser; Gerald Geraghty; Dwight Cummins
- Directed by: Franklin Adreon; William Witney; Joe Kane
- Starring: Jim Davis; Mary Castle; Kristine Miller
- Theme music composer: Herschel Burke Gilbert (ASCAP)
- Country of origin: United States
- Original language: English
- No. of seasons: 1
- No. of episodes: 39

Production
- Producers: Rudy Ralston; Edward J. White
- Editors: Jim Davis, narrator
- Running time: 30 minutes
- Production companies: Hollywood Television Service; Republic Pictures; Studio City Television Service

Original release
- Network: Syndication
- Release: January 23, 1954 – March 11, 1955

Stories of the Century is a 39-episode Western historical fiction television series starring Jim Davis that ran in syndication through Republic Pictures between 1954 and 1955.

== Synopsis ==
Jim Davis, who became famous decades later as the patriarch Jock Ewing in the Dallas television series, held a dual role as the show's narrator and Southwest Railroad detective Matt Clark. Mary Castle co-starred in twenty-six episodes as Clark's assistant, Frankie Adams; she was replaced by Kristine Miller, who appeared in thirteen episodes as Margaret "Jonesy" Jones. Clark and his female associates traveled the American West weekly, seeking to capture the most notorious badmen. They placed Clark at the right place and the right time to capture great moments in the history of the American Old West. Clark's appearances often seemed contrived, as when he appears just at the time young Robert Ford was assassinating Jesse James. Though Clark himself was fictional, the events he encountered were generally real, with their historicity enforced with newspaper accounts and some historical records.

The series was the first television production of Republic Pictures, later CBS Paramount Television, which then used the name Hollywood Television Service, and subsequently Studio City Television Service. The episodes were filmed at the Iverson Movie Ranch in Chatsworth in Los Angeles County, California. The series also filmed some scenes at nearby Vasquez Rocks.

In various episodes, Stories of the Century cast Marie Windsor as Belle Starr, Lee Van Cleef as Jesse James, Slim Pickens as a variation of the Sundance Kid rechristened the "Smiling Kid" in an episode about Butch Cassidy, Rick Jason as Joaquin Murrieta, Steve Brodie as Harry Tracy, John Dehner as Henry Plummer, Richard Jaeckel as Billy the Kid, and Bruce Bennett as William Quantrill of "Quantrill's Raiders".

== Production notes ==
In 1955, Stories of the Century became the first Western to win an Emmy Award in the category of "Western or Adventure Series". One of its competitors was The Roy Rogers Show.

In later rebroadcasts, as was common practice of the time (episodes that aired in reruns were usually given a separate title from new episodes), the program was entitled The Fast Guns.

The series has since lapsed into the public domain in the United States.

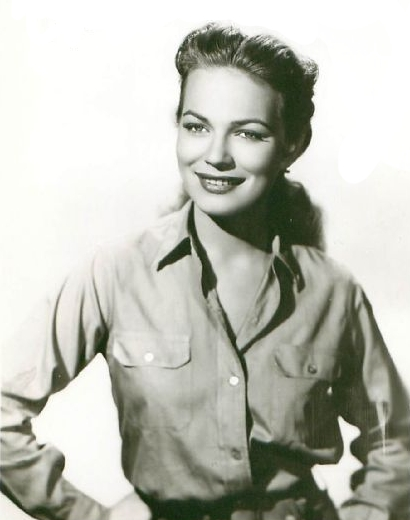
Kristine Miller in Stories of the Century

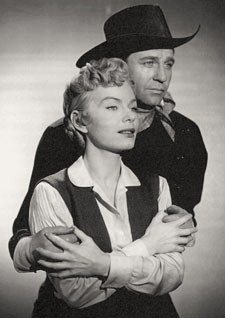
Jim Davis and Kristine Miller in Stories of the Century
