= Marilyn Hare =

American actress (1923–1981)

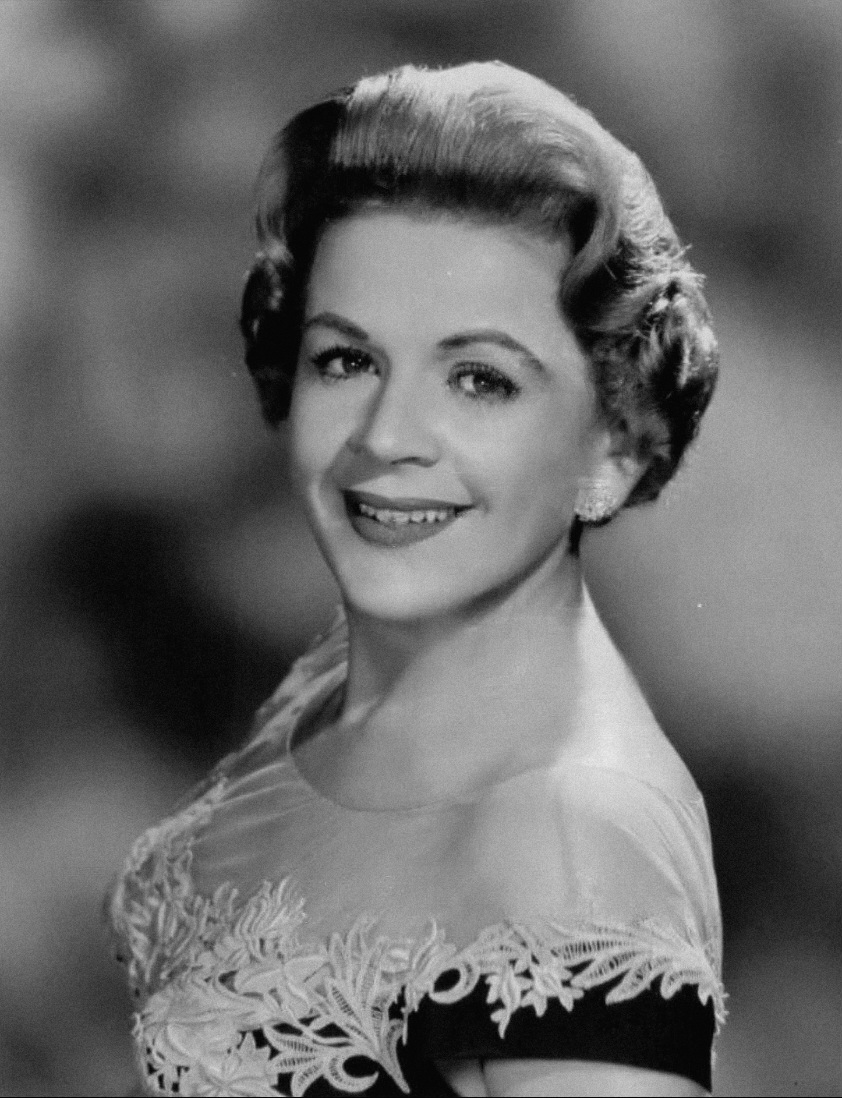
- Hare in 1958
- Born: October 13, 1923; Flushing, New York, U.S.
- Died: October 9, 1981 (aged 57); Encino, California, U.S.
- Resting place: Forest Lawn Memorial Park, Glendale, California
- Occupation: Actress
- Years active: 1939–1972
- Spouse: Joe Parker
- Children: 1
- Parent: Ernie Hare (father)

Marilyn Hare (October 13, 1923 – October 9, 1981) was an American actress, singer, and television personality active from the late 1930s through the early 1960s. A daughter of radio star Ernie Hare, one half of the famed duo The Happiness Boys, she began performing as a teenager in radio before moving into motion pictures with Republic Pictures during the 1940s. Best remembered for her World War II morale-boosting “10,000 Kisses” campaign, Hare later became a popular figure in early Los Angeles television, hosting programs such as You're Never Too Old and True to Life Theater.

== Early life ==
Marilyn Hare was born in 1923, she was the daughter of singer Ernie Hare. Following her father's death, she joined Billy Jones on the air to continue the duo's legacy. That broadcast gained the attention of film executives, who soon offered her a screen contract.

== Career ==
At the age 17, she was discovered while singing behind the scenes on the film Arkansas Judge when story editor Albert I. Cohen overheard her voice and offered her a screen test, Hare then signed with Republic Pictures.

In early 1941, Hare was chosen as the “Fiesta Girl” of Los Angeles’ All-Winter Sun Festival, traveling to Calexico to crown festival maids and deliver perfumed candles from Olvera Street.

During early 1942, Hare staged a morale stunt in which she vowed to kiss 10,000 soldiers at a California Army encampment near an aircraft plant. Standing on a soapbox, she sang “Kiss the Boys Goodbye” and by day's end had recorded 733 kisses on her “kissometer.” The story symbolized Hollywood's patriotic exuberance during the war.

Between 1941 and 1945, Hare appeared in musical and comedy films, including Angels with Broken Wings (1941), Hi, Neighbor (1942) with Jean Parker, John Archer, and Janet Beecher, and Ice-Capades Revue (1942) with Jerry Colonna, Vera Vague, Harold Huber, and Bill Shirley

Following her film years, Hare transitioned into television and radio. She co-hosted the senior-talent program You’re Never Too Old on KNXT and KLAC with Harry Koplan beginning in 1953.

In 1954, she began hosting True to Life Theater on Channel 13 (KCOP), a homemaking and entertainment series. For her work on the show, it was said she had “a personality as friendly as Miss America" and was "as natural as your next-door neighbor.”

By 1960, Hare remained a familiar local television personality. She appeared at the Women's Division of the Democratic State Central Committee's “Tea Time With Marilyn Hare” program in Long Beach, honoring civic leadership among women. She also had small roles on television series such as The Wild Wild West and My Three Sons.

== Personal life ==
Hare was married to director Joe Parker and they had two sons and a daughter together, Stephen, Christopher & Germaine Miles.

== Death ==
Hare died on October 9, 1981, in Encino, California, aged 58. She was buried in Forest Lawn Memorial Park, Glendale, California.

== Filmography ==
=== Film ===
| Year | Title | Role | Notes |
|---|---|---|---|
| 1941 | Angels with Broken Wings | Marilyn Lord | Feature film debut |
| 1941 | Ice-Capades | Audition Girl | Uncredited |
| 1942 | Lady for a Night | Mary Lou | |
| 1942 | A Tragedy at Midnight | | Uncredited |
| 1942 | Yokel Boy | Stenographer | |
| 1942 | Shepherd of the Ozarks | Susanna Weaver | |
| 1942 | Hi, Neighbor | Mary Lou | |
| 1942 | Ice-Capades Revue | Bubbles | |
| 1943 | West of Texas | Ellen Yaeger | |
| 1944 | Since You Went Away | Merchant Marine's Wife | Uncredited |
| 1956 | The House Without a Name | | Short film |

=== Television ===
| Year(s) | Title | Role | Episodes / Notes |
|---|---|---|---|
| 1956 | The 20th Century-Fox Hour | Miss Gallagher | 1 episode |
| 1961–1971 | My Three Sons | Effie / Mrs. Avery / Marge | 3 episodes |
| 1966 | The Dick Van Dyke Show | Third Lady | 1 episode |
| 1967 | The Wild Wild West | Lady in Stagecoach | 1 episode |
| 1969 | Family Affair | Joyce | 1 episode |
| 1972 | The Smith Family | Frances | 1 episode |
