= Follow the leader =

Follow the Leader may refer to:

== Film and television ==
=== Film ===
- Follow the Leader (1930 film), starring Ed Wynn
- Follow the Leader (1944 film), featuring the East Side Kids

=== Television ===
- "Follow the Leader", a 2000 episode of the television series Clifford the Big Red Dog.
- "Follow the Leader", a 2008 episode of the television series Wow! Wow! Wubbzy!
- "Follow the Leader" (Lost), a 2009 episode of the television series Lost
- Follow the Leader (TV series), a 1953 American television series

== Music ==
=== Songs ===
- "Follow the Leader", a song in the 1953 film Peter Pan
- "Follow the Leaders", a song by Killing Joke, 1981
- "Follow the Leader" (Eric B. & Rakim song), 1988
- "Follow the Leader", a song by Redd Kross from Show World, 1997
- "Follow the Leader", a song by The Soca Boys, 1998; was # 1 in Dutch Single Top 100
- "Follow the Leader" (Wisin & Yandel song), 2012

=== Albums ===
- Follow the Leader (Eric B. & Rakim album), 1988
- Follow the Leader (Korn album), 1998

== Other uses ==
- Follow the leader (game), a children's activity game
- Follow-the-leader, a drill used by marching bands
- Follow the leader, a type of participation dance
- "Follow the Leader", a 2000 Marvel Comics issue in the Gambit series
