= Singin' in the Corn =

1946 film directed by Del Lord

- Theatrical release poster
- Directed by: Del Lord
- Screenplay by: Isabel Dawn; Monte Brice; Elwood Ullman
- Story by: Richard Weil
- Produced by: Ted Richmond
- Starring: Judy Canova; Allen Jenkins; Guinn "Big Boy" Williams; Alan Bridge; Charles Halton; Robert Dudley
- Cinematography: George Meehan
- Edited by: Aaron Stell
- Production company: Columbia Pictures
- Distributed by: Columbia Pictures
- Release date: December 26, 1946
- Running time: 65 minutes
- Country: United States
- Language: English

Singin' in the Corn is a 1946 American Western comedy film directed by Del Lord and written by Isabel Dawn, Monte Brice and Elwood Ullman. The film stars Judy Canova, Allen Jenkins, Guinn "Big Boy" Williams, Alan Bridge, Charles Halton and Robert Dudley. It was released on December 26, 1946, by Columbia Pictures.

== Cast ==
- Judy Canova as Judy McCoy
- Allen Jenkins as Glen Cummings
- Guinn "Big Boy" Williams as Hank
- Alan Bridge as Honest John Richards
- Charles Halton as Obediah Davis
- Robert Dudley as Gramp McCoy
- Nick Thompson as Indian Chief
- Frances Rey as Ramona
- George Chesebro as Texas
- Ethan Laidlaw as Silk Stevens
- Frank Lackteen as Medicine Man
- Guy Beach as Judge
- Jay Silverheels as Indian Brave
- Rodd Redwing as Indian Brave
- Dick Stanley as Indian
- Charles Randolph as Indian
- Si Jenks as Old Man
- Pat O'Malley as O'Rourke
- Chester Conklin as Austin Driver
- Mary Gordon as Mrs. O'Rourke
