= Anyone Can Win =

American TV quiz series (1953)

- Genre: Quiz show
- Directed by: Sylvan Taplinger
- Presented by: Al Capp

Production
- Executive producer: Everett Rosenthal
- Producers: Sylvan Taplinger and Bernard J. Prockter

Original release
- Network: CBS
- Release: July 14 – September 1, 1953

Anyone Can Win is an American television quiz program that was broadcast on CBS from July 14, 1953, until September 1, 1953.

== Format ==
Cartoonist Al Capp moderated this series that posed general quiz questions to a different panel of four celebrities each week. In addition to direct questions, some charades were used. One celebrity in each episode wore a mask of Hairless Joe (a character in Capp's Li'l Abner comic strip), and remained unidentified until the episode's end. Capp said of his role, "Panelists and moderators are natural enemies while the show is on the air. As a panelist, I enjoyed harassing the moderator, and now as moderator I hope for a lively rascal or two on the panel."

Before each episode began, each member of the studio audience was asked to name the celebrity that he or she thought would have the most correct answers. After the quiz was completed, the audience members who had picked the winner shared $2000 in cash. Another aspect involved the home audience. When the show telephoned a viewer, if that person could identify the celebrity wearing the Hairless Joe disguise, he or she would win $500. If not, the prize value was increased by $500 per episode until someone made a correct identification.

The show used lights and a buzzer to indicate which panelist was to answer a question; correct answers were listed behind him or her "with more buzzing and more flashing lights." Guest panelists included Kay Francis, Patsy Kelly, Ilka Chase, and Jimmy Dykes.

== Production ==
Everett Rosenthal was the executive producer. The producers were Sylvan Taplinger and Bernard J. Prockter. Taplinger was also the director. The show was broadcast on Tuesdays from 9 to 9:30 p.m. Eastern Time, alternating weekly with Follow the Leader.

== Critical response ==
James Devane wrote in The Cincinnati Enquirer that Anyone Can Win "may well be the worst summer replacement on television." Devane found the use of lights and buzzers excessive, writing that the show "looks for all the world like something dreamed up by a pinball-machine addict. He added that even the contestants seemed unsure of the purpose of the show, which he described as "nothing but a half-hour of jolts, yawns, and bewilderment as to why the thing was put on in the first place."

Jo Coppola, writing in Newsday, called the program "another hodge-podge" and said that Capp's "particular talents are completely wasted" as the host of the show.

In a column in the San Mateo Times, Bob Foster described Anyone Can Win as "the most miserable effort to date" in the development of TV panel and quiz shows. Foster wrote that the "crude handling of the show" undermined what otherwise would have been a clever approach. He added that even the audience's opportunity to win money failed to create much excitement.

A review in the trade publication Broadcasting indicated that the program suffered to some extent because of the proliferation of panel programs on TV at that time and because of "the calibre of questions that researchers turned up." It also noted that Capp seemed unsuited for his role, noting "his uneasy manner and thoroughly stilted performance on the initial telecast".
