= Goodnight, Sweetheart (film) =

1944 film by Joseph Santley

- Theatrical release poster
- Directed by: Joseph Santley
- Screenplay by: Isabel Dawn; Jack Townley
- Story by: Frank Fenton; Joseph Hoffman
- Produced by: Edward J. White
- Starring: Robert Livingston; Ruth Terry; Henry Hull; Grant Withers; Thurston Hall; Lloyd Corrigan
- Cinematography: Bud Thackery
- Edited by: Ralph Dixon
- Music by: Joseph Dubin
- Production company: Republic Pictures
- Distributed by: Republic Pictures
- Release date: June 17, 1944
- Running time: 67 minutes
- Country: United States
- Language: English

Goodnight, Sweetheart is a 1944 American comedy film directed by Joseph Santley and written by Isabel Dawn and Jack Townley. The film stars Robert Livingston, Ruth Terry, Henry Hull, Grant Withers, Thurston Hall and Lloyd Corrigan. The film was released on June 17, 1944, by Republic Pictures.

== Plot ==
Goodnight, Sweetheart is a comedy that includes a couple's offbeat romance. Mainly, a reporter takes on the mayoral race of a candidate that has been endorsed by a rival newspaper.

== Cast ==
- Robert Livingston as Johnny Newsome
- Ruth Terry as Caryl Martin
- Henry Hull as Jeff Parker
- Grant Withers as Matt Colby
- Thurston Hall as Judge James Rutherford
- Lloyd Corrigan as Police Chief Davis
- Maude Eburne as Johnny's Landlady
- Ellen Lowe as Caryl's Landlady
- Olin Howland as Slim Taylor
- Lucien Littlefield as Collins
- Chester Conklin as Bottle Man
- Emmett Lynn as Pete
- William "Billy" Benedict as Bellboy
