= Rookies on Parade =

1941 film by Joseph Santley

- Film poster
- Directed by: Joseph Santley
- Written by: Sammy Cahn; Saul Chaplin; Karl Brown; Jack Townley; Milt Gross
- Produced by: Albert J. Cohen
- Starring: Bob Crosby; Ruth Terry; Eddie Foy Jr.; Marie Wilson
- Cinematography: Ernest Miller
- Edited by: Charles Craft
- Music by: Mort Glickman; Cy Feuer
- Production company: Republic Pictures
- Distributed by: Republic Pictures
- Release date: April 17, 1941
- Running time: 79 minutes
- Country: United States
- Language: English

Rookies on Parade is a 1941 musical comedy film directed by Joseph Santley and starring Bob Crosby, Ruth Terry, Eddie Foy Jr. and Marie Wilson It was produced and distributed by Republic Pictures. The film marked the studio's entry into the pre-World War II military comedy genre. The Army technical advisor was Captain Jack Voglin who performed the same duty for the 1941 films You're in the Army Now, You'll Never Get Rich and Buck Privates.

== Synopsis ==
Just as they write what they hope will be a hit musical comedy for Broadway, a team of songwriters are drafted into the army. Duke Wilson's former showgirl fiancée Lois is working as a hostess at the base where they are stationed and they decide to stage the musical there.

== Cast ==
- Bob Crosby as Duke Wilson
- Ruth Terry as Lois Rogers
- Gertrude Niesen as Marilyn Fenton
- Eddie Foy Jr. as Cliff Dugan
- Marie Wilson as Kitty Mulloy
- Cliff Nazarro as Joe Martin
- William Demarest as Mike Brady
- Sidney Blackmer as Augustus Moody
- Horace McMahon as Tiger Brannigan
- William Wright as Bob Madison
- Jimmy Alexander as Tommy
- Louis Da Pron as Harry Haxom
- Bill Shirley as Bill

== Release ==
Rookies on Parade was released in theaters on April 17, 1941.

== Bibliography ==
- Fetrow, Alan G. Feature Films, 1940-1949: a United States Filmography. McFarland, 1994.
- Hurst, Richard M. Republic Studios: Beyond Poverty Row and the Majors. Scarecrow Press, 2007.
