= Bill Shirley =

American actor and singer

- Born: William Jesse Shirley; July 6, 1921; Indianapolis, Indiana, U.S.
- Died: August 27, 1989 (aged 68); Los Angeles, California, U.S.
- Burial place: Crown Hill Cemetery and Arboretum, Indianapolis, Indiana, U.S., Section Community, Lot B-C-18; 39.827099°N 86.173018°W
- Occupations: Actor, singer, entertainer
- Years active: 1932–1989

William Jesse Shirley (July 6, 1921 – August 27, 1989) was an American actor and tenor/lyric baritone singer who later became a Broadway theatre producer. He is perhaps best known as the speaking and singing voice of Prince Phillip in Walt Disney's 1959 animated classic Sleeping Beauty and for dubbing Jeremy Brett's singing voice in the 1964 film version of My Fair Lady.

== Early years ==
William Jesse Shirley was born in Indianapolis, Indiana, on July 6, 1921. His father, Luther James Shirley, was a funeral director for Shirley Brothers Mortuaries. His mother, Inez Shirley (née Baldwin), was a well-known professional pianist. According to the Indianapolis Star, Inez first discovered her son's talent when he was around the age of five, when one day he began singing along to what she was playing on the piano. She directed him to the founder of the Ogden Chorale, who was taken with the child's vocal ability, expressive eyes, and "unusual" personality for a child of his age. From then on, Billy was known locally as a boy soprano and singing/acting prodigy. He sang at funerals from a very young age and from there became a very popular boy soloist with the Ogden Chorale, which sang at Christmas and Easter on the steps of the Soldiers' and Sailors' Monument. He performed with the Meglin Kiddies and was an active member of the Children's Civic Theater and the Irvington Playhouse.

At the age of eleven, he traveled with his family to California and was introduced to L. E. Behymer who arranged to introduce him to Sid Grauman. He listened to Billy sing, and the "boy with the golden voice" soon appeared in films by 20th Century Fox, Columbia and Paramount Studios. The family owned a dog, a Boston Terrier named Buddy. During the time he stayed in California, little Billy often wrote letters home requesting news about his pet.

Some of the boy's first acting roles were in rare or hard-to-find films, such as The Phantom President (1932) and As The Devil Commands (1933); the latter he sang Christmas carols in. Some press reports list the latter film's name as Acquitted, the name of a previous Columbia film from 1929.

Bill attended George W. Julian Elementary during his grade school years and attended Shortridge High School in adolescence. Among other things, he became a member of its student council along with such prominent figures as Madelyn Pugh and Kurt Vonnegut Jr.; he graduated in 1939. The following year, aged 19, Bill and his mother moved to Hollywood, where he studied voice and music at the Herbert Wall School of Music. His singing teacher there, the famous Andrés de Segurola, would accept Shirley as a pupil for no less than six months. Mrs. Shirley lived nearby to her son in Hollywood for sixteen years, and the two went to Indiana to visit family and friends quite often.

In early 1941, Shirley was introduced to Republic Studios president Herbert Yates by a mutual friend who worked at the studio and remembered that Shirley used to sing as a child. Shirley sang a few numbers for Yates, and was immediately signed up for a seven-year contract.

Shirley's roles in the Republic films were usually very small or supporting. He had a small, yet somewhat important, part in Flying Tigers, as a very young pilot who is mortally wounded during his first mission. The character of Dale was originally intended to die much earlier; however, directors were so impressed by his acting that his script was extended another four pages. He appeared in other rare and usually B-list films, such as Rookies on Parade (1941), Hi Neighbor (1942), Ice-Capades Revue (1942), and Sailors on Leave (1941).

On August 3, 1942, he enlisted in the Army. He served in recruitment and induction, as well as the Signal Corps Training Film division in Los Angeles, and the Quartermaster Corps and radio branch of the Special Service division in Ft. Warren, Wyoming. While in the Army he appeared in a Behymer Artists' Bureau presentation of Rigoletto, and was tagged by critics as "a potential find for the Metropolitan".

He was romantically linked to Jane Withers for four years.

== Career ==
After his Army service, he worked in radio, Broadway, the stage, in summer stock, and on television. He appeared in nightclubs, including a six-week engagement at Monte Proser's famous Copacabana in early 1947, the Latin Quarter in New York, the Mocambo in Los Angeles, and the Tropicana and Riviera in Las Vegas.

He found work for radio station KFI on two shows known as "Ladies Day" and "The Packard Hour". In 1949, he played Dutch Miller on "The Railroad Hour"'s presentation of Best Foot Forward, and played the role of the gondolier on episode of Ronald Colman's "Favorite Story" presentation of Edgar Allan Poe's "The Assignation". In 1947, he had a part in the musical "Look Ma I'm Dancin'!" as "Shauny O'Shay". During the tryout his part was cut severely, prompting him to leave the show. However, recordings of the production's soundtrack are still available that included Shirley's vocals, to avoid a potential musicians' strike. In late 1948, Darryl Zanuck received a Man-Of-The-Year award in a ceremony at the Mocambo. One scheduled singer was unable to appear, and asked Shirley to substitute for him.

Through producer George Jessel, Zanuck heard Bill sing and promptly put him under contract as a ghost singer for 20th Century-Fox. He dubbed vocals for films including Oh, You Beautiful Doll (1949) (Mark Stevens' singing voice) and Dancing In The Dark (1949), but was released by the studio for no known reason a few months later. For nearly a year, he was romantically linked to Colleen Townsend.

Although he had occasional vocal work, Shirley sometimes had difficulty furthering his career. Following a few performances in KFI's "Hollywood Bowl" in 1945 and "On Stage America" in 1946, Shirley alternated between radio and the stage. For a while, he performed often with singing actress Gale Robbins. In 1949, he starred with Robbins in the short-lived Broadway revue "A La Carte". He performed with her on an episode of Movietown Radio Theater (also known as Skippy Hollywood Theater) entitled "Show Business". In 1950, the pair performed as themselves on an episode of the Ed Wynn Show.

In 1952 he got his only leading role onscreen: as Stephen Foster in I Dream of Jeanie, although actor Ray Middleton received the top billing. The same year, he played Bruce Martingale, a singer at a local tavern, in Abbott and Costello Meet Captain Kidd. In late 1952, he joined a Hollywood USO troupe to entertain soldiers in Korea for the holidays. During this time, he came down with a throat infection which caused his doctors enough concern to consider a surgical procedure, leading to several cancelled engagements. By the first week of February he was reported better; by April, he had recovered sufficiently enough to take on the role of Johann Strauss Jr. in Edwin Lester's production of The Great Waltz. Rehearsals began the following month. He frequently performed with USO troupes, appearing with stars such as Debbie Reynolds and Keenan Wynn.

In November 1955, he appeared on Arthur Godfrey's "Talent Scouts" show and won first place, although this did not always bring about much publicity or notice that was not localized to his home state.

In July 1958, he returned to Indianapolis to play Curly in a Starlight Musicals production of Oklahoma!, alongside Grace Olsen and Will B. Able.

== Connections with Debbie Reynolds and Eddie Fisher ==
Shirley's career intersected with both Debbie Reynolds and Eddie Fisher during the late 1940s and early 1950s.

In January 1947, Shirley accepted a nightclub engagement at the Copacabana in New York City. Eddie Fisher later wrote that he had declined the same engagement, regarding it as unsuitable for his career at the time. Although Shirley and Fisher pursued separate careers, commentators have noted their similar appearance — dark curly hair, tenor vocal style, and "crooner" repertoire.

Contemporary reviews praised Shirley's professionalism despite intense stage fright, and described the audience's favorable response.

In Fisher's 1981 memoir My Life, My Loves, he recalled the episode with evident discomfort. He remembered watching Shirley's debut from backstage and wrote, "Proser hired the tenor Bill Shirley to replace me… I was backstage opening night when Bill sang Jerome Kern's 'All the Things You Are' and stopped the show." Fisher added that Monte Proser whispered to him, "See, kid...that could have been you." The moment, as described by Fisher, marked a turning point in his own career and seeded a lasting sense of rivalry. Evidence of reciprocal tension from Shirley is absent.

Following the December 1952 USO tour to Korea, Shirley became publicly linked with actress Debbie Reynolds. Both were reported to have experienced illness during or after the tour. By mid-February 1953, Shirley was seen escorting Reynolds to dinner in Los Angeles, and Photoplay Magazine (July 1954 issue) confirmed that she had been corresponding with him during the trip. Over the next year, newspapers regularly described Shirley as Reynolds' steady "new swain" or "new beau," with the San Francisco Examiner referring to her as "the love of his life" in July 1953. The two appeared publicly at concerts, parties, and charity functions, with coverage continuing into mid-1954.

Meanwhile, Fisher also performed in Korea and described the experience in his memoirs My Life, My Loves (1981) and Been There, Done That (1999). His accounts of the Korea tour emphasized discomfort of his own — mild illness, dental pain, and insects attracted to stage floodlights — and he noted feeling cast unfavorably in the press when Reynolds was allegedly hospitalized in Honolulu (though reports place her in Tokyo) on her return. In "My Life, My Loves", Fisher characterized Reynolds' announcement of her Korea tour as a "calculated play for sympathy" due to her being upset with him for long-postponing their wedding.

Contemporary coverage emphasizes Shirley's attentiveness toward Reynolds after the junket, while Fisher's retrospective account presents a contrasting perspective.

From May 1953 until June 1954, media outlets increasingly emphasized Reynolds and Shirley as a couple, their presence in each other's company suggesting ease, comfort, and authenticity. By spring 1954, Shirley was publicly described as Reynolds' preferred companion. Fisher's memoir emphasizes his own charitable efforts during the same timeframe when Shirley and Reynolds were publicly active in United Cerebral Palsy fundraisers and regularly photographed together. He stated, "I did them all… It had nothing to do with building my image." This coincides with growing press attention toward Shirley and Reynolds as a couple.

In June 1954, Eddie Fisher re-entered the narrative, shortly after Reynolds and Shirley had been described as a steady couple. Aided by his public relations team and close allies, a "formal introduction" and marriage proposal at the Cocoanut Grove between himself and Reynolds rapidly tipped publicity back to the favor of "America's Sweethearts". Fisher's memoir and press accounts from the period suggest his reappearance was timed to coincide with Reynolds' rising visibility alongside Shirley. While Fisher does not reference Shirley directly, the timing and tone of his recollections suggest a desire to reassert presence, both personally and publicly.

Reynolds, though hesitant, ultimately agreed to the engagement under significant public and professional pressure. Reynolds' acceptance of Fisher's proposal was widely publicized, yet biographical analyses suggests the moment was orchestrated by Fisher's public relations team, including best friend Mike Todd, Evelyn Keyes, and Milton Blackstone. Her prior companionship with Shirley gradually diminished from subsequent coverage, and no public statements were made to clarify the transition.

Mid-1954 marks a period of relative retreat or transition in Shirley's Hollywood career. Home in Indianapolis to offer services for the groundbreaking of Community Hospital East that September, he stated in a printed interview, hypothetically, that if he could not be an actor, he would like to work in publicity or be an agent. Having long believed that live audience response enhances performance, his post-1954 career trajectory pointed more towards the stage, summer stock, industrial shows, and advocacy for marginalized voices, particularly in civil rights and community theater, rather than exclusively "Hollywood".

A widely circulated photograph taken at Mountain Home Air Force Base in December 1954 shows Shirley in the background, uncredited, as Fisher adjusts Reynolds' cold-weather gear before a performance.

In the wake of Fisher's abrupt reentry and public proposal to Reynolds, widely seen as a strategic move to reclaim public favor, Shirley chose not to contest the narrative or speak publicly about it, despite the emotional cost. His silence on the matter, out of personal dignity and deep regard for Reynolds, was a protective move that effectively shielded her from scandal and allowed the transition to proceed without controversy.

By May 1955, he was signed by Liberty Records to record two songs, "The Devil's Keeping Busy" and "Sometime", written by Buddy Pepper and Inez James. The lyrics of both songs echo themes of heartbreak, betrayal, and lingering love, consistent with his personal circumstances at the time. "The Devil's Keeping Busy" in particular was noted for its "powerful" and "stirring" tone. By June 1955, a year after the proposal, Shirley moved to New York. Reynolds married Fisher later that year, and never referred to Shirley again.

== Sleeping Beauty ==
Bill Shirley and Mary Costa rehearsing for Sleeping Beauty (1959)

In May 1953, Shirley was approached by the Walt Disney Company to provide the speaking and singing voice for the character of Prince Phillip in its animated version of Sleeping Beauty. Shirley's singing range was tenor/baritone, and had a youthful quality which was ideal for the voice of the young Prince Phillip. Before they were cast as the voices of Aurora and Phillip, Mary Costa and Shirley were asked to audition together to make sure their voices complemented each other. During the film's production, Shirley and actor Ed Kemmer were used by the Disney animators as live action reference models for Prince Phillip; the animators had them perform many of the sequences from the movie while they drew the character. He had many rehearsals with Mary Costa, who was providing the voice for Princess Aurora.

They acted out their parts just as if they were to appear personally in the finished production. The two even kissed for the sound-track cameras. After their voices were recorded, the animators drew every motion of the characters' lips to fit each enunciated syllable from the actors' mouths, so that viewers would be able to "see" the voices and hear them. The animators would draw sixteen drawings for each syllable formed by the lips. Shirley would later remember that he said, "Whoa, Samson!" to a non-existent horse for a whole day before the sound engineers were satisfied with the inflection. And at that point, Samson had not even been sketched as a horse. To him, Samson was "a real character", and he thought that Walt Disney could popularize him as "another Pluto".

Shortly before the film was released, Shirley and Costa performed together at the Hollywood Bowl on a Disney themed night in 1958. In an interview, Costa recalled that she and the actresses playing the fairy godmothers (Verna Felton, Barbara Jo Allen, and Barbara Luddy) were endeared to Shirley, his good looks, and his shyness, adding that "we all had our crushes on him" and "he was so shy and we all had just genuine crushes on that Prince. He was really cute." In another interview she said, "We loved to tease him. Verna Felton who played Flora would always creep up behind him with a pencil and act like it was a baton [wand]. She'd do some fairy work on him and say he was going to be the greatest, handsomest, and all of this." Shirley and Costa sang the iconic song of the film,"Once Upon a Dream".

== Additional work ==
During the early 1950s, he was a regular guest on Bekins "Hollywood Music Hall" with actress Lucille Norman, who had worked with him in "Sweethearts on Parade". Along with other celebrities such as Jean Hersholt, Barbara Ruick, Bob Hope, and Zsa Zsa Gabor, he provided services for humanitarian efforts such as hospital groundbreakings, polio benefits, and cerebral palsy telethons.

Shirley performed in several Starlight Musical Theater Company productions, such as "The Great Waltz" (1953), a play in which he portrayed Johann Strauss II. Florence Henderson was featured as the composer's love interest.

Bill became exceptionally popular with Sacramento's Music Circus, as reported by such news items as the Sacramento Bee. Making his official debut in June 1952 as Bumerli in The Chocolate Soldier, older newspaper and magazine articles confirm that he apparently received much acclaim for his acting and singing, especially in his portrayals of Johann Strauss II of The Great Waltz, and Lt. Joseph Cable of South Pacific. His long list of performances earned him the moniker of "Mr. Music Circus".

Throughout the 1950s and 1960s, Shirley was also a prominent figure in industrial musicals. Such examples are "The Wide New World With Ford" for the Ford Motor Company in 1960 and "The Grip of Leadership" for Coca-Cola in 1961. Specific industrial show sponsors include Oldsmobile, Coca-Cola, Chevrolet, RCA, National Cash Register Co., Ford Motor Co., and the General Electric Co.

Another famous vocal role of Shirley's (again as an uncredited ghost singer) was the singing voice of Freddy Eynsford-Hill (played by Jeremy Brett) in the Warner Bros. film of My Fair Lady. Shirley sang one of the film's most memorable songs, "On the Street Where You Live". For a long while, Brett claimed that he himself had sung the song and that Mr. Shirley merely "sweetened the high tones." It was not until 1994 that Brett admitted in a televised interview that it was Shirley who sang the song, not him, although Brett claimed that he knew nothing about the dubbing until the film's opening night.

Bill Shirley is often stated to have retired from acting in 1963. However, he was a member of the Actors' Equity Association and continued to perform well after 1963, especially in industrial shows such as "Diesel Dazzle" and "A Step Ahead" in 1966, and returned to play Nat Miller in a Sacramento Music Circus production of "Take Me Along" in 1975. He had co-produced "Dames At Sea", which introduced Bernadette Peters, in the late 1960s.

== Death ==
For the last ten years of his life, he worked with Litton Industries in the real estate or electronics department, primarily in Beverly Hills. He retired from the company in May 1989, three months before his death from lung cancer, at age 68 on August 27, 1989, at the Guardian Convalescent Hospital in Los Angeles. He was interred in Indianapolis's Crown Hill Cemetery.

== Filmography ==
- The Phantom President (1932) – Bit
- As the Devil Commands (1933) – Orphan
- Rookies on Parade (1941) – Bill
- Ice-Capades (1941) – bit role (uncredited)
- Doctors Don't Tell (1941) – Tom Wayne
- Sailors on Leave (1941) – Bill Carstairs
- Mercy Island (1941) – Guide (uncredited)
- Hi, Neighbor (1942) – Dick
- Flying Tigers (1942) – Dale
- Ice-Capades Revue (1942) – Denny
- Three Little Sisters (1944) – Pvt. Ferguson (as William Shirley)
- Dancing in the Dark (1949) – Singer of title song over opening credits (uncredited)
- Oh, You Beautiful Doll (1949) – dubbed singing voice for Mark Stevens (uncredited)
- Come to the Stable (1949) – Male tenor singer with Twentieth Century-Fox Studio Orchestra (movie trailer only, unseen, uncredited)
- Nancy Goes to Rio (1950) – Dubbed voice of tenor in operetta – (uncredited)
- With a Song in My Heart (1952) – (partially dubbed singing voice for Richard Allan; uncredited)
- I Dream of Jeanie (1952) – Stephen Foster
- Abbott and Costello Meet Captain Kidd (1952) – Bruce Martingale
- Sweethearts on Parade (1953) – Bill Gamble
- Sleeping Beauty (1959) – Prince Phillip (voice)
- My Fair Lady (1964) – Freddy Eynsford-Hill (singing voice, uncredited)

== Radio ==
- "High School Parade Hour", WIRE (May or June 1938)
- "Fitch Bandwagon", WIRE (featuring Carl "Deacon" Moore's Orchestra) (September 1942)
- Hollywood Bowl, KFI (May 1945)
- "On Stage America", two episodes; original performance: February 19, 1946; second episode February 16, 1948
- "Ladies Day" KFI (1946)
- "Packard Hour" KFI
- "Favorite Story", three episodes; "The Assignation"; "Long Ago"; "Journey to Bethlehem" (12-21-48 broadcast) (1948)
- Railroad Hour, "Best Foot Forward" (March 30, 1949)
- Movietown Radio Theater "Show Business" (May 4, 1950)
- "Stars For Safety" WMAQ (January 31, 1953) with Art Baker, Robert Young, John Hodiak, and Barbara Logan.

== Television ==
- KTTV (February 6, 1949 program) - Himself
- "Ed Wynn Show" with Gale Robbins (S1 Episode 27) (1950) – Himself
- Movietown RSVP, KTLA (July 2, 1950)
- "Fashion Magic", CBS (two episodes; February and September 1951)
- "Hollywood Music Hall" with Lucille Norman (1954)
- Arthur Godfrey Show (week of February 19, 1956)
- "Music For A Summer Night" WKBW-TV (August 1959)

== Stage ==
- Behymer Artists Bureau - "Rigoletto" (1942)
- Opera Club's presentation of Die Fledermaus in March 1942
- Hollywood Grand Opera Company, Wilshire Ebell Theatre, "Rigoletto" (Duke of Mantua), December 1943
- Monte Proser's Copacabana, January 1947
- Chanticleer; Baltimore, Massachusetts (opened March 24, 1947)
- Ogunquit Playhouse stock engagement under George Abbott, circa June 27, 1947
- "Best Foot Forward" with Hugh Martin, Alice Pearce, Edith Fellows, Harold Lang; John Drew Memorial Theatre (August/September 1947)
- "Look Ma, I'm Dancin" (1947)
- Latin Quarter; Miami Beach (February - March 1948)
- George White's "Scandals"; Florentine Gardens (June - July 1948)
- Friar's Frolic; Shrine Auditorium (April 16, 1949)
- Latin Casino; Philadelphia, Pennsylvania (December 1948)
- "A La Carte"; El Capitan Theatre (1949)
- "Tsk! Tsk! Tsk! Paree" (April 1950)
- "Pardon Our French"; Broadway Theatre (October 5, 1950 - January 6, 1951)
- "It's About Time" Brattle Theatre Company (March 1951)
- C.L.C Club engagement (April 21, 1951)
- "Lend An Ear" Jamaica Theatre (July 1951)
- "The Great Waltz" with Florence Henderson and John Charles Thomas; Civic Light Opera Curran Theatre (June 8 - July 4, 1953)
- "That's Life" Alcazar Theatre (November 1954)
- Versailles Club contract as replacement for Jack Cassidy (1956)
- Versailles Theatre "The Thousand And Second Night" with Larry Daniels and Mildred Cook
- "Great Waltz" as Johann "Schani" Strauss II; with Lois Hunt, Terry Saunders, and John Raitt; Pitt Stadium, PA (June - July 1957)
- "South Pacific" as Lt. Joseph Cable; Neptune Music Circus, NJ (week of July 22, 1957)
- "South Pacific" as Lt. Joseph Cable; St. John Terrell's Music Circus (July 28 - August 11, 1957)
- "South Pacific" as Lt. Joseph Cable; Westchester Music Theater, Rye (August 1957)
- "Ziegfeld Follies" Riviera Hotel in Las Vegas (November 1958)
- "Paint Your Wagon" as Julio; Highland Park, Chicago, Illinois with John Carradine (July 1959)
- "Rosalie" as Lt. Fay; St. Louis Municipal Opera (July 1960)
- "The Great Waltz" as Johann Strauss II; South Shore Music Circus; Massachusetts (July 1960)
- "Anything Goes" as Billy Crocker; Meadowbrook Dinner Theater (March 1961)
- "Where's Charley?" as Jack; Bradford Roof Dinner Theater (April 1961)
- "The Great Waltz"; St. Louis Municipal Opera (July 3–9, 1961)
- "Yankee Doodle Comes to Town" with Billie Worth; Bristol Hippodrome (December 1962 - January 1963)

== Discography (partial) ==
- Decca "Selections from George Abbott's production 'Look Ma, I'm Dancin'! Originally issued as Decca DA-637 (78 rpm) March 15, 1948 and later as DL-5231 (LP) in 1950. Recorded on December 18 and 20, 1947 in New York.
- Decca L5253-L2554, A Face in the Crowd/Until Tonight; Paramount Symphony Orchestra; recorded December 10, 1949
- RCA Victor (20-5542), The Voices of Walter Schumann, "Magic is the Earth", 1953
- Liberty 55005, Sometime/The Devil's Keeping Busy, 1955
