= Grace Hayle =

American actress

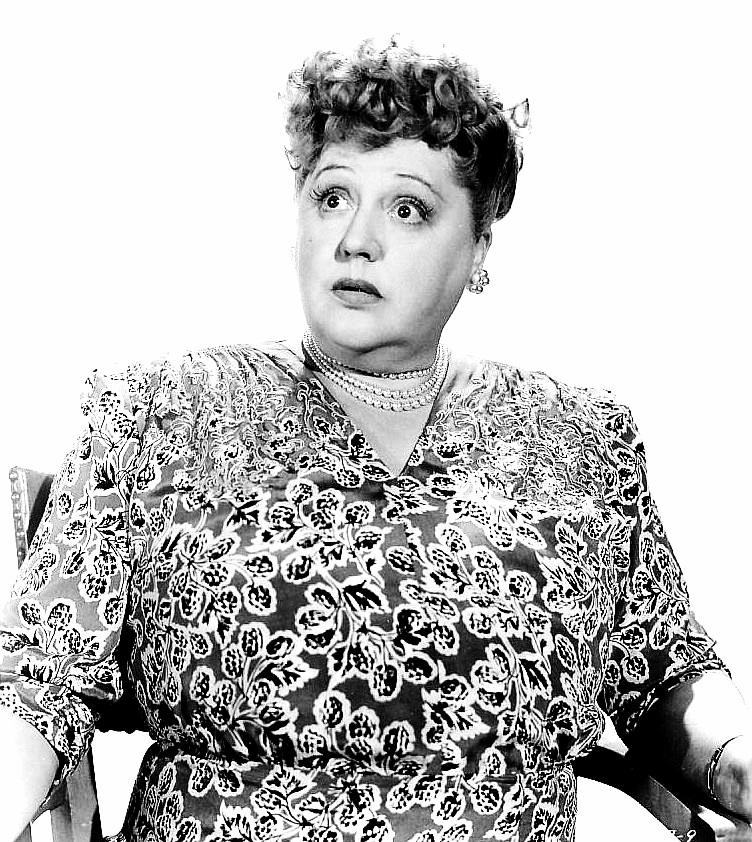
- Hayle in the 1940s
- Born: July 24, 1888
- Died: March 20, 1963 (aged 74); Los Angeles, California, U.S.
- Occupation: Actress
- Years active: 1932–1957

Grace Hayle (July 24, 1888 – March 20, 1963) was an American actress who appeared in more than 300 films.

In the fall of 1917, Hayle was the "new leading woman" with the Knickerbocker Players at the Knickerbocker Theatre in Philadelphia. She portrayed Laura Murdock in The Easiest Way a 1917 production with that group. On Broadway, she acted in Double Exposure (1918) and The Duchess Misbehaves (1946).

Hayle died on March 20, 1963, in Hollywood Presbyterian Hospital, aged 74.

== Selected filmography ==
- Back Street (1932) - Lady in Street (uncredited)
- Evenings for Sale (1932) - Pink Elephant Lady (uncredited)
- The Death Kiss (1932) - Chalmer's Nosy Neighbor (uncredited)
- Hard to Handle (1933) - Fat Lady with Vanishing Cream (uncredited)
- The Intruder (1933) - Ship Passenger (uncredited)
- The Mind Reader (1933) - Shill (uncredited)
- Diplomaniacs (1933) - Dowager on Boat (uncredited)
- Gold Diggers of 1933 (1933) - Society Reporter (uncredited)
- Professional Sweetheart (1933) - Fat Reporter (uncredited)
- Baby Face (1933) - Mrs. Hemingway (uncredited)
- Mary Stevens, M.D. (1933) - Wealthy Fat Lady (uncredited)
- Bureau of Missing Persons (1933) - Lady Who Wants Her Cook Back (uncredited)
- Bombshell (1933) - Mrs. Titcomb (uncredited)
- Goodbye Love (1933) - Lura 'Ducky' Groggs
- Design for Living (1933) - Woman on Staircase (uncredited)
- Lady Killer (1933) - Fido's Owner (uncredited)
- Bedside (1934) - Mrs. Mason (uncredited)
- The Cat and the Fiddle (1934) - Lettuce (uncredited)
- Wonder Bar (1934) - Fat Dowager (scenes deleted)
- Glamour (1934) - Miss Lang (uncredited)
- Laughing Boy (1934) - Mabel (uncredited)
- Sing and Like It (1934) - Miss Fishbeck - Little Theatre Stage Director
- Twenty Million Sweethearts (1934) - Mrs. Martha Brokman (uncredited)
- Straight Is the Way (1934) - Mrs. Clapman (uncredited)
- Romance in the Rain (1934) - Mrs. Crandall
- The Party's Over (1934) - Society Woman (uncredited)
- Chained (1934) - Edith's Friend - Shipboard Spinster (uncredited)
- Outcast Lady (1934) - First Gossiper (uncredited)
- 6 Day Bike Rider (1934) - Nervous Man's Big Girl Friend (uncredited)
- Music in the Air (1934) - Innkeeper's Wife (uncredited)
- The Whole Town's Talking (1935) - Reporter (uncredited)
- All the King's Horses (1935) - Henpecked Husband's Wife (uncredited)
- Living on Velvet (1935) - Talkative Woman at Party (uncredited)
- Roberta (1935) - Miss Jones - Newspaper Reporter (uncredited)
- The Casino Murder Case (1935) - Fat Lady at Auction (uncredited)
- Mister Dynamite (1935) - Dowager (uncredited)
- Party Wire (1935) - Eleanor (uncredited)
- Calm Yourself (1935)- Mrs. James K. Vallance (uncredited)
- Front Page Woman (1935) - Nell Bonnett (uncredited)
- Don't Bet on Blondes (1935) - Matron Looking at Racing Sheet (uncredited)
- Bright Lights (1935) - Fat Lady on Airplane (uncredited)
- Orchids to You (1935) - Giggly Woman (uncredited)
- She Married Her Boss (1935) - Agnes Mayo
- Music Is Magic (1935) - Laundry Manageress (uncredited)
- Mary Burns, Fugitive (1935) - Nurse Jennie
- Dancing Feet (1936) - Mrs. Worthington (uncredited)
- The Great Ziegfeld (1936) - Wife at Chicago World's Fair (uncredited)
- The First Baby (1936) - Effusive Woman (uncredited)
- The Moon's Our Home (1936) - Miss Hambridge
- Small Town Girl (1936) - Nurse Collins (uncredited)
- The Harvester (1936) - Mrs. Kramer
- Ticket to Paradise (1936) - Minnie Dawson
- A Son Comes Home (1936) - Tourist Mother (uncredited)
- Pepper (1936) - Sissie's Mother (uncredited)
- 15 Maiden Lane (1936) - Giddy Guest (uncredited)
- Without Orders (1936) - Fat Lady at Airport (uncredited)
- Theodora Goes Wild (1936)- Mrs. Cobb (uncredited)
- Reunion (1936) - Mrs. Williams (uncredited)
- Winterset (1936) - Woman (uncredited)
- Maytime (1937) - Mrs. Perkin (uncredited)
- Internes Can't Take Money (1937) - Patient (uncredited)
- A Star Is Born (1937) - Woman in Funeral Mob (uncredited)
- The Hit Parade (1937) - Cooking Expert (uncredited)
- Meet the Missus (1937) - Miss Corn Belt (uncredited)
- It Could Happen to You (1937) - Woman Reporter (uncredited)
- The Singing Marine (1937) - Fat Lady with Mob of Women (uncredited)
- Topper (1937) - Outraged Heavy Woman (uncredited)
- Music for Madame (1937) - Fat Wedding Guest (uncredited)
- Tovarich (1937) - Mrs. Van Hemert
- Wise Girl (1937) - Fat Mother with Baby Wilbur (uncredited)
- Man-Proof (1938) - Third Gossipy Woman (uncredited)
- Change of Heart (1938) - Elevator Passenger (uncredited)
- Battle of Broadway (1938) - Heavy Woman in Lobby (uncredited)
- Wives Under Suspicion (1938) - Lady in Courtroom (uncredited)
- Men Are Such Fools (1938) - Fat Woman in Elevator (uncredited)
- The Shopworn Angel (1938) - Mistress of Ceremonies (uncredited)
- Letter of Introduction (1938) - Autograph Seeker - Park Plaza (uncredited)
- Keep Smiling (1938) - Fat Woman at Auction (uncredited)
- Three Loves Has Nancy (1938) - First Woman Getting Autograph (uncredited)
- Carefree (1938) - Grace (uncredited)
- Secrets of an Actress (1938) - Fat Visitor in Dressing Room (uncredited)
- Straight Place and Show (1938) - Stout Woman (uncredited)
- Young Dr. Kildare (1938) - Stout Lady (scenes deleted)
- Five of a Kind (1938) - Autograph Seeker (uncredited)
- The Shining Hour (1938) - Mrs. Briggs (uncredited)
- Arrest Bulldog Drummond (1938) - Tourist (uncredited)
- Next Time I Marry (1938) - Fat Reporter (uncredited)
- Sweethearts (1938) - Telephone Operator (uncredited)
- Pacific Liner (1939) - Fat Passenger (uncredited)
- Boy Trouble (1939) - Fat Mother
- Yes, My Darling Daughter (1939) - Dibble's Customer (uncredited)
- Risky Business (1939) - Fan (uncredited)
- Mr. Moto in Danger Island (1939) - Mrs. Brown (uncredited)
- Undercover Doctor (1939) - Mrs. Croyne (uncredited)
- The Forgotten Woman (1939) - Fat Woman in Beauty Shop (uncredited)
- Coast Guard (1939) - Stout Woman (uncredited)
- Death of a Champion (1939) - Stout Woman (uncredited)
- The Star Maker (1939) - Rural Mother (uncredited)
- The Women (1939) - Cyclist (uncredited)
- Espionage Agent (1939) - Mrs. O'Grady
- First Love (1939) - Madame Margarita Catalini (uncredited)
- Our Neighbors – The Carters (1939) - Minor Role (uncredited)
- The Honeymoon's Over (1939) - Fat Woman (uncredited)
- Charlie McCarthy, Detective (1939) - Fat Woman (uncredited)
- The Shop Around the Corner (1940) - Plump Woman (uncredited)
- High School (1940) - Miss Cummings (uncredited)
- I Take This Woman (1940) - Mrs. Farthington (scenes deleted)
- The Farmer's Daughter (1940) - Torsavitch (uncredited)
- Road to Singapore (1940) - Chaperone on Yacht (uncredited)
- Ma! He's Making Eyes at Me (1940) - Mrs. Smythe (uncredited)
- Primrose Path (1940) - Drunk's Wife Leaving Bluebell (uncredited)
- 'Til We Meet Again (1940) - Fussy Woman Passenger (uncredited)
- Girl in 313 (1940) - Mrs. Hudson
- The Ghost Breakers (1940) - Screaming Woman (uncredited)
- Maryland (1940) - Mrs. Carrington (uncredited)
- Dr. Christian Meets the Women (1940) - Tom's Wife (uncredited)
- Wildcat Bus (1940) - Fat Woman (uncredited)
- Spring Parade (1940) - Mrs. Burkhart (uncredited)
- Third Finger, Left Hand (1940) - Mrs. Kelland (uncredited)
- The Great Dictator (1940) - Madame Napaloni
- Remedy for Riches (1940) - Investor in Line (uncredited)
- A Night at Earl Carroll's (1940) - Mrs. Alonzo Smith (uncredited)
- Honeymoon for Three (1941) - Fat Book Club Member (uncredited)
- You're the One (1941) - 2nd Woman in Ladies Steam Room
- Knockout (1941) - Mrs. Smithers (uncredited)
- The Wagons Roll at Night (1941) - Mrs. Grebnick (uncredited)
- West Point Widow (1941) - Dowager (uncredited)
- For Beauty's Sake (1941) - Fat Woman (uncredited)
- Puddin' Head (1941) - Dowager (uncredited)
- Unfinished Business (1941) - Woman (uncredited)
- Buy Me That Town (1941) - Woman (uncredited)
- International Lady (1941) - Weighty Dowager (uncredited)
- Birth of the Blues (1941) - Fat Woman in Cafe (uncredited)
- New York Town (1941) - Mrs. Bixby (uncredited)
- Marry the Boss's Daughter (1941) - Elevator Passenger (uncredited)
- The Night of January 16th (1941) - Heavy Woman (uncredited)
- Two-Faced Woman (1941) - Rhumba Dancer (uncredited)
- My Favorite Blonde (1942) - Woman in Theatre Box (uncredited)
- Ship Ahoy (1942) - Merton's Pianist (uncredited)
- Private Buckaroo (1942) - Dowager (uncredited)
- I Married an Angel (1942) - Mrs. Gabby (uncredited)
- Enemy Agents Meet Ellery Queen (1942) - Overweight Woman (uncredited)
- Just Off Broadway (1942) - Souvenir Hunter (uncredited)
- Henry Aldrich, Editor (1942) - Customer (uncredited)
- A Night to Remember (1942) - Irate Tenant at Bruhl's Address (uncredited)
- Madame Spy (1942) - Red Cross Woman (uncredited)
- Slightly Dangerous (1943) - Banana Split Customer (uncredited)
- All by Myself (1943) - Mrs. Stone (uncredited)
- Let's Face It (1943) - Mrs. Wigglesworth
- Footlight Glamour (1943) - Mrs. Cora Dithers (uncredited)
- Hi'ya, Sailor (1943) - Plump Hostess (uncredited)
- She's for Me (1943) - Dowager
- True to Life (1943) - Minor Role (uncredited)
- Beautiful But Broke (1944) - Birdie Benson
- Cover Girl (1944) - Food Critic Dipping Soup (uncredited)
- Cowboy and the Senorita (1944) - Fat Woman (uncredited)
- Mrs. Parkington (1944) - Fat Woman at Ball (uncredited)
- Murder in the Blue Room (1944) - Dowager (uncredited)
- Too Young to Kiss (1951) - Chubby Woman Attending Audition (uncredited)
- Flesh and Fury (1952) - Laughing Woman (uncredited)
- Washington Story (1952) - Phone Bit in Montage (uncredited)
- Don't Bother to Knock (1952) - Mrs. McMurdock (uncredited)
- The Turning Point (1952) - Mrs. Martin (uncredited)
- Ma and Pa Kettle at Waikiki (1953) - Party Guest (uncredited)
- Houdini (1953) - Woman Who Screams (uncredited)
- The Caddy (1953) - Matron at Party (uncredited)
- Money from Home (1953) - Mrs. Cheshire (uncredited)
- Dangerous Mission (1954) - Mrs. Alvord (uncredited)
- The Big Moment (1954)
- Athena (1954) - Mrs. Griswalde (uncredited)
- Foxfire (1955) - Tourist (uncredited)
- Never Say Goodbye (1956) - Gray-Haired Customer in Tavern (uncredited)
- Bigger Than Life (1956) - Mother at PTA Meeting (uncredited)
- Loving You (1957) - Mrs. Gunderson (uncredited) (final film role)
