= Judy Canova =

American comedian, actress, singer, and radio personality

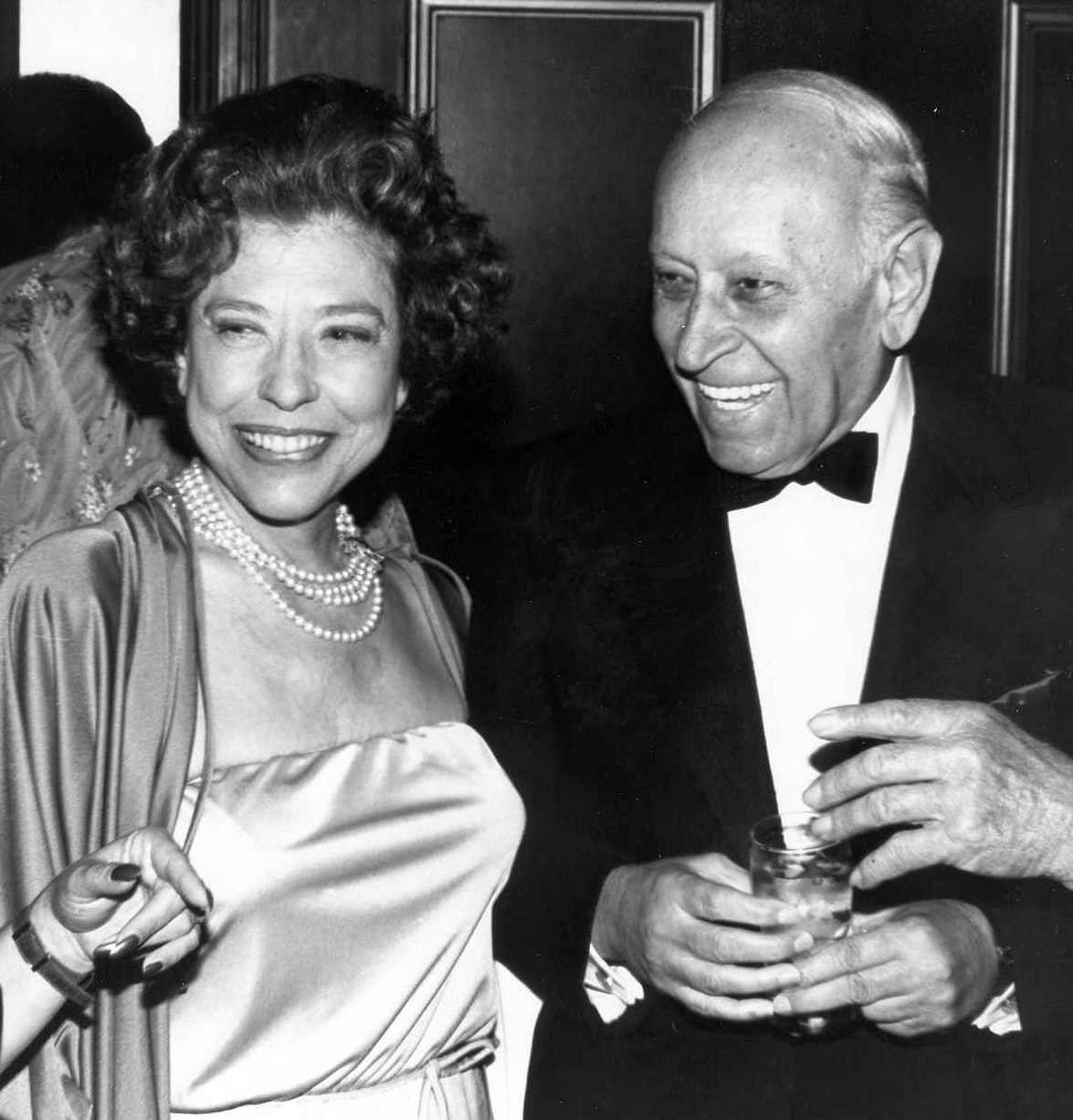
- Canova and George Raft (1979)
- Born: Juliette Canova (some sources indicate Julietta Canova); November 20, 1913; Starke, Florida, U.S.
- Died: August 5, 1983 (aged 69); Hollywood, California, U.S.
- Occupations: Comedian; actress; singer; radio personality
- Spouses: Robert Burns (m. 1936; div. 1939) James Ripley (m. 1941; ann. 1941) Chester B. England (m. 1943; div. 1950) Filberto Rivero (1950–1964)
- Children: 2, including Diana Canova

Judy Canova (November 20, 1913 – August 5, 1983), born Juliette Canova (some sources indicate Julietta Canova), was an American comedienne, actress, singer, and radio personality who appeared on Broadway and in films. She hosted her own eponymous network radio program, a popular series broadcast from 1943 to 1955.

== Biography ==
=== Early career ===
Canova was born in Starke, Florida, one of seven siblings, to Joseph Francis Canova, a businessman, and Henrietta E. Canova (née Perry), a singer. Canova claimed that her family originated in the Pyrenees of Spain, but other sources indicate that the family may have been from the island of Menorca.

She began her showbusiness career with a family vaudeville routine, joining her sister Annie and brother Zeke. Their performances as the Three Georgia Crackers took them from Florida theaters to the Village Barn, a Manhattan club. Canova sang, yodeled and played guitar, and she was typed as a wide-eyed likable country bumpkin, often barefoot and wearing her hair in braids, sometimes topped with a straw hat. She was sometimes introduced as the Ozark Nightingale or the Jenny Lind of the Ozarks.

=== Stardom: Radio, Broadway, films, and recordings ===
Canova's fame began as a teenager, when bandleader Rudy Vallée offered her a guest spot on his radio show The Fleischmann Hour. The Canova family performed on the radio often in the 1930s, and they made their Broadway theater debut in the revue Calling All Stars.

Canova signed with Warner Bros. and appeared in short subjects and minor features before signing with Paramount Pictures for one year. After she starred in the 1939 Broadway musical comedy Yokel Boy with Buddy Ebsen, executives at Republic Pictures, with a customer base largely in rural areas, signed Canova in 1940 shortly after the show ended its run. Canova quickly became Republic's leading female star, playing country women who typically blundered into trouble in such titles as Scatterbrain (1940), Sis Hopkins (1941) and Joan of Ozark (1942). However, Canova did not appear in Republic's film adaptation of Yokel Boy; her role was played by Joan Davis.

Canova left Republic in 1943 over a salary dispute and signed with Columbia Pictures for three feature films: Louisiana Hayride (1944), Hit the Hay (1945), and Singin' in the Corn (1946). She returned to Republic in 1951 to star in color comedy features, beginning with Honeychile, until 1955.

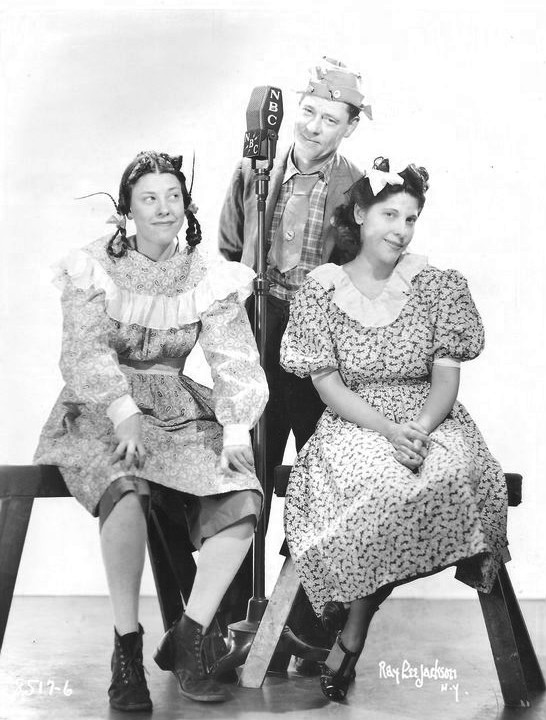
The Canovas as they appeared on The Chase and Sanborn Hour in 1938. From left: Judy, Zeke and Annie

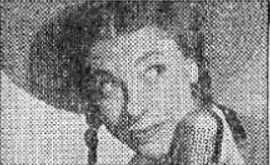
Photo from 1944 advertisement for the Judy Canova Show

=== Radio and television ===
In 1943, Canova starred in The Judy Canova Show, which ran for 12 years on radio, first on CBS and then on NBC. Playing herself as a love-starved Ozark "bumpkin" dividing her time between home and Southern California, Canova was accompanied by a cast that included voice master Mel Blanc (using voices that he later gave to cartoon characters Speedy Gonzales and Sylvester), Ruth Perrott, Ruby Dandridge, Joseph Kearns, and Sharon Douglas. Gale Gordon, Sheldon Leonard, Gerald Mohr, and Hans Conried also appeared sporadically.

Canova's radio and film careers ended in 1955. Although she made a smooth transition to television, her radio show was not made into a television series. She made frequent guest appearances on television shows such as The Colgate Comedy Hour, The Steve Allen Show, Matinee Theatre, Alfred Hitchcock Presents, The Mickey Mouse Club, and The Danny Thomas Show. She appeared as a mystery guest on the show What's My Line on July 18, 1954.

Canova appeared in two failed television series pilots. In 1967, she portrayed Mammy Yokum in an NBC adaptation of Al Capp's Li'l Abner. She also starred in The Murdocks and the McClays, a retelling of Romeo and Juliet set in the Virginia hills, which aired on ABC in August 1970 as the final installment in a three-part showcase of pilots titled Comedy Preview.

=== Singing ===
Canova recorded for the RCA Victor label. She also worked on Broadway and in Las Vegas nightclubs through the early 1970s, touring with the revival of No, No Nanette in 1971.

=== Business ===
In 1954, Canova and her husband obtained controlling interest in the Los Angeles–based company Camera Vision Productions, Inc, which developed an automated camera that was reported to reduce television and film production costs by as much as 50%.

=== Legacy ===
Canova is honored with two stars on the Hollywood Walk of Fame, one for her contributions to the film industry at 6821 Hollywood Boulevard and one for her radio career at 6777 Hollywood Boulevard.

== Personal life ==
Canova's first husband was New York insurance man Robert Burns, whom she married in 1936. While still married, she became romantically involved with Edgar Bergen in 1937, but divorced Burns in 1939. Canova was briefly married to James Ripley in 1941. Her third marriage, to Chester B. England in 1943, ended in divorce by 1950. She married her final husband, musician Filberto Rivero, in 1950. The marriage produced daughter Diana Canova, a singer and actress known for her television roles on Soap and I'm a Big Girl Now. That marriage ended in 1964.

Canova died in 1983 from cancer at age 69. Her ashes were interred in the secluded Columbarium of Everlasting Light section at Forest Lawn Memorial Park Cemetery in Glendale, California.

== Filmography ==
Features:

- In Caliente (1935) – Specialty Singer
- Going Highbrow (1935) – Annie
- Broadway Gondolier (1935) – Hillbilly Specialty (uncredited)
- Artists & Models (1937) – Toots
- Thrill of a Lifetime (1937) – Herself
- Scatterbrain (1940) – Judy Hull
- Sis Hopkins (1941) – Sis Hopkins
- Puddin' Head (1941) – Judy Goober
- Sleepytime Gal (1942) – Bessie Cobb
- True to the Army (1942) – Daisy Hawkins
- Joan of Ozark (1942) – Judy Hull
- Chatterbox (1943) – Judy Boggs
- Sleepy Lagoon (1943) – Judy Joyner
- Louisiana Hayride (1944) – Judy Crocker
- Hit the Hay (1945) – Judy Stevens / Helen Rand
- Singin' in the Corn (1946) – Judy McCoy
- Honeychile (1951) – Herself
- Oklahoma Annie (1952) – Herself
- The WAC from Walla Walla (1952) – Herself
- Untamed Heiress (1954) – Herself
- Carolina Cannonball (1955) – Herself
- Lay That Rifle Down (1955) – Herself
- The Adventures of Huckleberry Finn (1960) – Sheriff's Wife
- Cannonball! (1976) – Sharma Capri

Short subjects:

- The Song of Fame (1934) – Herself
- Husband's Holiday (1935)
- Meet the Stars #7: Meet Roy Rogers (1941) – Herself
- Meet the Stars #8: Stars Past and Present (1941) – Herself
- Screen Snapshots: Radio Shows (1945) – Herself
- Screen Snapshots: Fashions and Rodeo (1945) – Herself
- Screen Snapshots: The Judy Canova Show (1946) – Herself
- Screen Snapshots: Famous Hollywood Mothers (1947) – Herself

Television:

- NBC Matinee Theater (1955) (Season 1 Episode 12: "She's the One with the Funny Face")
- The Red Skelton Show (1956) (Season 5 Episode 24: "Clem's Feud")
- The Steve Allen Show (1957) (Season 3 Episode 6) as Country Girl
- The Danny Thomas Show (1958) (Season 5 Episode 24: "The Country Girl") as Elsie Hooper
- Alfred Hitchcock Presents (1960) (Season 5 Episode 33: "Party Line") as Helen Parch
- Vacation Playhouse (1965) (Season 3 Episode 11: "Cap'n Ahab") as Tillie Meeks
- Pistols 'n' Petticoats (1967)
  - (Season 1 Episode 17: "Daisy and the Gambler") as Daisy Frogg
  - (Season 1 Episode 22: "The Golden Fleece") as Sadie
- Lil Abner (1967) (TV movie) as Mammy Yokum
- The Murdocks and the McClays (1970) (TV movie) as Ira Murdock
- Love, American Style (1973) (Season 5 Episode 8: segment "Love and the Eat's Cafe") as Mrs. Hankins
- Police Woman (1974) (Season 1 Episode 2: "The Beautiful Die Young") as Arkie Lady
- The Love Boat (1977) (Season 1 Episode 9: "The Captain's Captain / Romance Roulette / Hounded") as P.J. Muldoon

== Listen to ==
- OTR Network Library: The Judy Canova Show (10 episodes), otr.net; accessed December 12, 2014.

== Bibliography ==
- Ohmart, Ben. Judy Canova: Singin' in the Corn, BearManor Media, 2010. ISBN 1-59393-316-9
