= The Moon's Our Home =

1936 film by William A. Seiter

- Directed by: William A. Seiter
- Written by: Faith Baldwin; Alan Campbell; Isabel Dawn; Boyce DeGaw; Dorothy Parker
- Produced by: Walter Wanger
- Starring: Henry Fonda; Margaret Sullavan; Walter Brennan; Henrietta Crosman
- Cinematography: Joseph A. Valentine
- Edited by: Dorothy Spencer
- Music by: Gerard Carbonara
- Production company: Walter Wanger Productions
- Distributed by: Paramount Pictures
- Release date: April 10, 1936
- Running time: 80 minutes
- Country: United States
- Language: English
- Budget: $402,573
- Box office: $417,663

The Moon's Our Home is a 1936 American comedy film directed by William A. Seiter and starring Henry Fonda, Margaret Sullavan and Walter Brennan. It was adapted from a novel of the same name written by Faith Baldwin and first published in serial form in Cosmopolitan magazine.

== Plot ==
New York novelist Anthony Amberton meets up with actress Cherry Chester. The two date and later marry, though neither knows of the other's fame. The real adventure begins on the honeymoon, when their relationship heats up with insults and arguments.

== Cast ==
- Margaret Sullavan as Cherry Chester / Sarah Brown
- Henry Fonda as Anthony Amberton / John Smith
- Henrietta Crosman as Lucy Van Steedan
- Walter Brennan as Lem
- Charles Butterworth as Horace Van Steedan
- Beulah Bondi as Mrs. Boyce Medford
- Dorothy Stickney as Hilda
- Brandon Hurst as Babson
- Lucien Littlefield as Ogden Holbrook
- Margaret Hamilton as Mitty Simpson
- Spencer Charters as Abner Simpson
- Margaret Fielding as Miss Manning
- Grace Hayle as Miss Hambridge
- Monte Vandergrift as Brakeman
- Richard Powell as Candy Butcher
- Harry Bowen as Reporter
- Harry Harvey as Reporter
- John Graham Spacey as Cherry's Chauffeur
- Corbet Morris as Secretary
- Georgie Cooper as Maid
- Robert Bolder as Butler
- Andrea Leeds as Perfume Salesgirl (credited as Antoinette Lees)
- Thelma White as Perfume Salesgirl
- J. Gunnis Davis as Footman

== Reception ==
The film recorded a loss of $111,845.

Writing for The Spectator in 1936, Graham Greene gave the film a good review, describing it as "a trivial charming comedy". Greene praised Dorothy Parker's comedy writing and the acting of Margaret Sullavan and Henry Fonda for providing "the sense of something fresh and absurd and civilized".

== On radio ==
Lux Radio Theatre aired a one-hour adaptation of the film on February 10, 1941, with James Stewart and Carole Lombard in the leading roles.
