= Scatterbrain (film) =

- Theatrical release poster
- Directed by: Gus Meins
- Screenplay by: Val Burton; Jack Townley; Paul Conlan
- Produced by: Gus Meins
- Starring: Judy Canova; Alan Mowbray; Ruth Donnelly; Eddie Foy Jr. Joseph Cawthorn; Wallace Ford
- Cinematography: Ernest Miller
- Edited by: Ernest J. Nims
- Music by: William Lava
- Production company: Republic Pictures
- Distributed by: Republic Pictures
- Release date: July 20, 1940
- Running time: 73 minutes
- Country: United States
- Language: English

Scatterbrain is a 1940 American comedy film directed by Gus Meins and written by Val Burton, Jack Townley and Paul Conlan. The film stars Judy Canova, Alan Mowbray, Ruth Donnelly, Eddie Foy Jr., Joseph Cawthorn and Wallace Ford. The film was released on July 20, 1940, by Republic Pictures.

== Plot ==
Eddie MacIntyre, press agent, talent scout, and right-hand man to J.R. Russell, Producer/Director of Perfection Pictures, is planning a scheme in which he will "plant" his girlfriend, actress Esther Harrington, in the Ozark Mountains, then "discover" her for the role of "Ruthybelle" in Perfection's upcoming production, "Thunder Over the Ozarks." With the full approval of Nicholas Raptis, Goldwynian president of Perfection Pictures, Eddie farms Esther out to a hillbilly family to remain until she is "discovered"---a discovery to be accompanied by fanfare and publicity. Russell has heard a recording or Esther's voice, but he has never seen her, and when he arrives in the Ozarks he "discovers" the wrong girl and signs up Judy Hull, daughter of the hillbilly family, instead of Esther. The mistake is not discovered until Judy and her Pappy arrive in Hollywood and she becomes Perfection's Public Problem Number One. Because there are no loopholes in her contract, Perfection is obligated to use her, but if they do her hillbilly antics will make them the laughingstock of the industry. Or so they think. But they finally discover a loophole that reads her contract is null and void if she marries before the film is produced. Russell informs Eddie that it is up to him to court and marry Judy so the contract can be voided. But Eddie's plan is to hire Professor De Lemma, a specialist in mind transference, to persuade Judy that she doesn't want to be a movie star and wants to return home to her cows, pigs, and chickens. But Judy does want to be a movie star, and Pappy has sold the farm, become a part of the Hollywood colony, and is playing polo with producers named Darrell.

== Cast ==
- Judy Canova as Judy Hull
- Alan Mowbray as J.R. Russell
- Ruth Donnelly as Miss Stevens
- Eddie Foy Jr. as Eddie MacIntyre
- Joseph Cawthorn as Nicholas Raptis
- Wallace Ford as Sam Maxwell
- Isabel Jewell as Esther Harrington
- Luis Alberni as Prof. DeLemma
- Billy Gilbert as Hoffman
- Emmett Lynn as Pappy Hull
- Jimmy Starr as Joe Kelton
- Matty Malneck as Orchestra Leader
- Marion Martin as Blonde Girl at Screen test (uncredited)
