= Remember Pearl Harbor (film) =

1942 film by Joseph Santley

- Theatrical release poster
- Directed by: Joseph Santley
- Screenplay by: Malcolm Stuart Boylan; Isabel Dawn
- Produced by: Albert J. Cohen (associate producer)
- Starring: Donald M. Barry; Alan Curtis; Fay McKenzie; Sig Ruman; Ian Keith; Rhys Williams; Diana Del Rio
- Cinematography: Ernest Miller
- Edited by: Charles Craft
- Music by: Emil Gerstenberger; Mort Glickman; Arnold Schwarzwald (all uncredited); Cy Feuer (musical director)
- Production company: Republic Pictures Corporation
- Distributed by: Republic Pictures
- Release date: May 18, 1942
- Running time: 75 minutes
- Country: United States
- Language: English

Remember Pearl Harbor is a 1942 American propaganda film directed by Joseph Santley and written by Malcolm Stuart Boylan and Isabel Dawn. The film stars Donald M. Barry, Alan Curtis, Fay McKenzie, Sig Ruman, Ian Keith and Rhys Williams. Remember Pearl Harbor was released on May 18, 1942, by Republic Pictures. (Note: After the attack on Pearl Harbor, Hollywood films readily absorbed the "stab-in-the-back" conspiracy that influences the low-budget actioneer, Remember Pearl Harbor.)

== Dedication in opening credits ==
We respectfully dedicate this picture to those gallant men, both American and Philippine, who bravely gave their lives so that the battle for freedom and democracy the world over can and will be won.

== Plot ==
On November 16, 1941, at the La Dessa U. S. army post in the Philippines, a Japanese aircraft carrier off the coast transmits a coded message to the contraband radio of Nazi spies who stick the message in a bottle of German liquor called Kümmel. The message states a Japanese battleship is approaching Pearl Harbor, Private Steve "Lucky" Smith (Donald M. Barry) meets his fellow soldiers Bruce Gordon (Alan Curtis) and "Portly" Porter (Maynard Holmes) in the Casa Marina bar, where Lucky and Steve try to attract Portly's sister, Marcia (Fay McKenzie). Portly arranges for Marcia to be the secretary to Andy L. Anderson (Rhys Williams), the owner of the bar. A businessman named Littlefield (Robert Emmett Keane) slips into Marcia's booth to read the message in the Kümmel bottle. Lucky comes to her defence by attacking Littlefield, with Bruce and Portly joining the fight.

Captain Hudson (Ian Keith) orders the soldiers to find the spy's radio. Though Lucky is in charge, he soon returns to the bar to find Marcia. Bruce and Portly, meanwhile, pick up a coded radio transmission from a Japanese boat and follow the beam to Littlefield's hideout. A gunfight erupts where Portly is killed and Littlefield escapes. When Lucky later admits to the captain that he was not there, the captain court-martials him and promotes Bruce to corporal. Lucky escapes from jail and soon after, Anderson, one of the spies, meets with Van Hoorten (Sig Ruman), another Nazi posing as a Dutch Indian. They discuss a plan to stockpile ammunition and gas for the Japanese troops who will invade.

Anderson is to kill Littlefield and arrange for the gas to be transported to their warehouse, but when Lucky turns to Anderson for help, Anderson slyly tips him off to Littlefield's hideout. That night, Lucky attacks Littlefield but Anderson shoots him, then gives Lucky the job of transporting some "crude oil" to his warehouse.

On the way, Bruce stops Lucky's truck and asks him to turn himself in. At the warehouse, Lucky realizes that his cargo is gasoline. Marcia and Lucky sneak into Van Hoorten's office that night and find ammunition and a Nazi flag. Van Hoorten bursts in and Lucky shoots him.

Bruce, who has tracked Lucky to the warehouse, hears a radio announcement that Pearl Harbor has been bombed. Before the three can leave, Japanese aircraft land nearby and the soldiers enter the office with Anderson. The three Americans escape, find a radio and send Captain Hudson a message for help.

When the American troops arrive, Hudson spots another Japanese aircraft carrier in the bay. Lucky courageously saves the Americans by flying a Japanese aircraft into the carrier in a suicide mission. Bruce receives a Distinguished Service Cross while Marcia collects the award on Lucky's behalf.

== Cast ==
- Donald M. Barry as Pvt. Steve "Lucky" Smith
- Alan Curtis as Bruce Gordon
- Fay McKenzie as Marcia Porter
- Sig Ruman as Dirk Van Hoorten
- Ian Keith as Capt. Hudson
- Rhys Williams as Señor "Andy" Anderson
- Robert Emmett Keane as Mr. Littlefield
- Maynard Holmes as Pvt. "Portly" Porter
- Diana Del Rio as Doralda
- Sammy Stein as MP Sgt. Adams
- Paul Fung as Japanese Bartender
- James B. Leong as Japanese Major

== Production ==
Principal photography on Remember Pearl Harbor, took place from March 12 to April 6, 1942.

== Reception ==
Reviewer Herbert Cohn of the Brooklyn Daily Eagle wrote:

"Remember Pearl Harbor" underneath its title, is a phony. It isn't about Pearl Harbor at all. ... [It is] about fifth columnists in the Philippines, a few thousand miles west of Pearl Harbor. And it isn't even a good picture about fifth columnists. It is pokey, except when the Japanese arrive toward the end and the army garrison at Manilla comes to life to be trapped by them.

Bosley Crowther in his review of Remember Pearl Harbor for The New York Times, despaired,"Pearl Harbor is something to remember, but Republic's 'Remember Pearl Harbor' definitely is not. For this cheap little action drama, which popped into Loew's Criterion yesterday, has nothing to recommend it save its title, nothing in the way of a story that isn't old. ."
