= Yokel Boy =

1942 film by Joseph Santley

- Directed by: Joseph Santley
- Screenplay by: Isabel Dawn
- Story by: Russell Rouse
- Based on: Yokel Boy by Lew Brown
- Produced by: Robert North
- Starring: Albert Dekker; Joan Davis; Eddie Foy Jr. Alan Mowbray; Roscoe Karns; Mikhail Rasumny
- Cinematography: Ernest Miller
- Edited by: Edward Mann
- Music by: Mort Glickman
- Production company: Republic Pictures
- Distributed by: Republic Pictures
- Release date: March 13, 1942
- Running time: 69 minutes
- Country: United States
- Language: English

Yokel Boy is a 1942 American comedy film directed by Joseph Santley and written by Isabel Dawn. It is based on the 1939 play Yokel Boy by Lew Brown. The film stars Albert Dekker, Joan Davis, Eddie Foy Jr., Alan Mowbray, Roscoe Karns and Mikhail Rasumny. The film was released on March 13, 1942, by Republic Pictures.

== Plot ==
Hollywood studio boss R. B. Harris is desperate for a box-office hit. Reading about a young man in Kansas who has gained a reputation as the movies' number one fan, Harris summons him, Joe Ruddy, to ask his advice about a new gangster story. Joe suggests hiring a real gangster. Joe goes to Chicago to see the notorious "Buggsy" Malone, first trying a nightclub where Buggsie's sister Molly is the featured singer. Molly manages to coax her brother into doing the movie, eager to get him to give up his criminal ways and even hiding a million dollars of his cash until he turns over a new leaf.

On the movie set, leading lady Vera Valaize is irate about the casting and Buggsie's rewriting of the scenes, so she walks off. Molly is asked by her brother to take over the part. During a bank robbery scene shot on location, a couple of Buggsie's cronies hatch a scheme to actually rob the bank. By the time Buggsie straightens everything out, he finds out Molly's fallen in love with Joe and arranges their wedding on the way home.

== Cast ==
- Albert Dekker as 'Buggsy' Malone
- Joan Davis as Molly Malone
- Eddie Foy Jr. as Joe Ruddy
- Alan Mowbray as R.B. Harris
- Roscoe Karns as Al Devers
- Mikhail Rasumny as Amatoff
- Lynne Carver as Vera Valaize
- Marc Lawrence as Henchman Trigger
- Tom Dugan as Professor
- James C. Morton as Sign Painter
- Pierre Watkin as Johnson
- Marilyn Hare as Stenographer
