= A Tragedy at Midnight =

1942 film by Joseph Santley

- Theatrical release poster
- Directed by: Joseph Santley
- Screenplay by: Isabel Dawn
- Story by: Hal Hudson; Sam Duncan
- Produced by: Robert North
- Starring: John Howard; Margaret Lindsay; Roscoe Karns; Mona Barrie; Keye Luke; Hobart Cavanaugh
- Cinematography: Ernest Miller
- Edited by: Edward Mann
- Music by: Mort Glickman; Arnold Schwarzwald
- Production company: Republic Pictures
- Distributed by: Republic Pictures
- Release date: February 2, 1942
- Running time: 68 minutes
- Country: United States
- Language: English

A Tragedy at Midnight is a 1942 American comedy film directed by Joseph Santley and written by Isabel Dawn. The film stars John Howard, Margaret Lindsay, Roscoe Karns, Mona Barrie, Keye Luke and Hobart Cavanaugh. The film was released on February 2, 1942, by Republic Pictures.

== Cast ==
- John Howard as Greg Sherman
- Margaret Lindsay as Beth Sherman
- Roscoe Karns as Det. Lt. Cassidy
- Mona Barrie as Alta Wilton
- Keye Luke as Ah Foo
- Hobart Cavanaugh as Charles Miller
- Paul Harvey as Landeck
- Lilian Bond as Lola
- Miles Mander as Dr. Hilary Wilton
- William Newell as Swanson
- Wendell Niles as Show Announcer
- Archie Twitchell as Henry Carney
