= Hi, Neighbor =

1942 film by Charles Lamont

- Theatrical release poster
- Directed by: Charles Lamont
- Screenplay by: Dorrell McGowan; Stuart E. McGowan
- Story by: Dorrell McGowan; Stuart E. McGowan
- Produced by: Armand Schaefer
- Starring: Jean Parker; John Archer; Janet Beecher; Marilyn Hare; Bill Shirley; Pauline Drake
- Cinematography: Ernest Miller
- Edited by: Howard O'Neill
- Music by: Mort Glickman
- Production company: Republic Pictures
- Distributed by: Republic Pictures
- Release date: July 27, 1942
- Running time: 72 minutes
- Country: United States
- Language: English

Hi, Neighbor is a 1942 American comedy film directed by Charles Lamont and written by Dorrell McGowan and Stuart E. McGowan. The film stars Jean Parker, John Archer, Janet Beecher, Marilyn Hare, Bill Shirley and Pauline Drake. The film was released on July 27, 1942, by Republic Pictures.

== Cast ==
- Jean Parker as Dorothy Greenfield
- John Archer as Dr. Hall
- Janet Beecher as Hattie Greenfield
- Marilyn Hare as Mary Lou
- Bill Shirley as Dick
- Pauline Drake as Amelia White
- Fred Sherman as Mr. Brown
- Myrtle Wiseman as Lulubelle
- Scotty Wiseman as Scotty
- Barbara Jo Allen as Vera Greenfield
- Don Wilson as Radio Announcer
- Roy Acuff as Roy Acuff
- Harry Cheshire as Professor Edgar Boggs
- Lillian Randolph as Birdie
