= Helen Barnes =

American actress

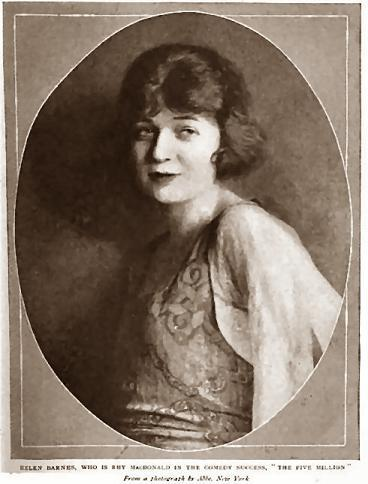
- Munsey's Magazine, 1920
- Born: Helen Gertrude Barnes; July 5, 1895; Shelton, Connecticut, U.S.
- Died: June 1, 1925 (aged 29) near Woodmont, Connecticut, U.S.
- Other names: Helen G. Barnes
- Occupation(s): Actress; dancer

Helen Gertrude Barnes (July 5, 1895 – June 1, 1925) was an American musical comedy actress and Ziegfeld Follies Girl.

== Early life ==
Helen Gertrude Barnes was born on July 5, 1895, in Shelton, Connecticut, the first of two daughters raised by William and Anna Barnes. Her father hailed from Pennsylvania and supported his family as a day laborer and later as a typewriter salesman. Barnes’s mother was born in England of Scottish parents and had come to America, presumably with her parents, at around the age of two. William and Anna married in 1894, and in July 1896 completed their family with the birth of their second daughter, Ruth. Not long after Ruth’s arrival the Barnes family relocated to Washington D.C.

== Career ==
She began her career at the age of nineteen as a member of the chorus line in the 1914/15 Broadway musical Watch Your Step at the New Amsterdam Theatre. In May 1915 Barnes began a four-year association with Florenz Ziegfeld, Jr. as performer in his annual Ziegfeld Follies shows at the same venue. Later in 1915 Barnes played Lotta Nichols in the musical comedy Stop! Look! Listen! over its four-month run at the Globe Theatre.

A New York Times reviewer wrote in a May 14, 1918, review of the play The Squab Farm by Frederic Hatton and Fanny Hatton, that Helen Barnes appeared to be the audience’s favorite squab. The play, a satire that compared a motion picture set to a barnyard, was performed at the Bijou Theatre with Helen Barnes playing the role of Hortense Hogan. The Squab Farm closed after a four-week run and had among its cast members sixteen-year-old Tallulah Bankhead.

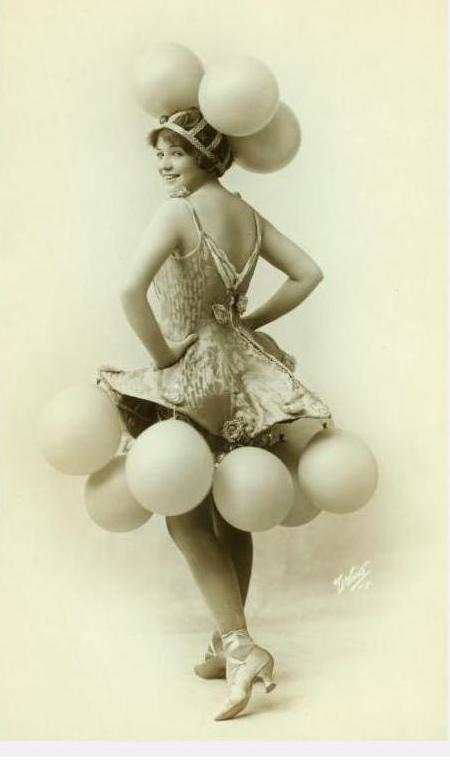
Helen Barnes as a Ziegfeld Dancer New York Public Library Digital Gallery

Barnes went on to play Georgie Van Alstyne in Oh, My Dear! (1918/19); Rhy Mac Donald in The Five Million (1919); Myrtilla Marne in An Innocent Idea (1920); and Tillie in Ladies' Night (1920/21).

== Travel ==
Helen Barnes turned to traveling in the early 1920s. She spent several months between 1920 and 1921 touring England and France and in 1922 embarked on a near year-long around the world tour in which she visited Scandinavia, Belgium, Monaco, Australia, New Zealand, India, Burma, Thailand, Ceylon, China, Hong Kong, Japan and Hawaii.

== Death ==
Helen Barnes died in the early morning hours of June 1, 1925, in an automobile accident not far from Woodmont, Connecticut. She and her boyfriend, John Griffin, a junior at Sheffield Scientific School and son of a well-to-do manufacturer from Indiana, were traveling at a high speed when their car struck a slow moving vehicle, careened into another and then rolled over a number of times killing the two almost instantly. Friends of Griffin felt the other driver, who was later cited for driving without a vehicle license, shared some the blame for the tragedy due to his erratic driving. Barnes and Griffin had gone out that morning to dine at an all-night hotdog stand in nearby East Haven. Though there had been no official announcement, Griffin had previously told friends that the two planned to marry.
