= Louisiana Hayride (film) =

1944 American comedy film

- Directed by: Charles Barton
- Written by: Manuel Seff; Paul Yawitz
- Produced by: Charles Barton; Sam White
- Starring: Judy Canova; Ross Hunter; Richard Lane; Lloyd Bridges
- Cinematography: L. William O'Connell
- Edited by: Otto Meyer
- Music by: Saul Chaplin
- Production company: Columbia Pictures
- Distributed by: Columbia Pictures
- Release date: July 13, 1944
- Running time: 67 minutes
- Country: United States
- Language: English

Louisiana Hayride is a 1944 American comedy film directed by Charles Barton and starring Judy Canova, Ross Hunter and Richard Lane. It was made by Columbia Pictures rather than Republic, with whom Canova mostly worked during the decade. The film's art direction was by Lionel Banks and Walter Holscher.

== Cast ==
- Judy Canova as Judy Crocker
- Ross Hunter as Gordon Pearson
- Richard Lane as J. Huntington McMasters
- Lloyd Bridges as Montague Price
- Matt Willis as Jeb Crocker
- George McKay as Canada Brown
- Minerva Urecal as Ma Crocker
- Hobart Cavanaugh as Malcolm Cartwright
- Jessie Arnold as Aunt Hepzibah (uncredited)
- Russell Hicks as H.C. Forbes
- Arthur Loft as Studio director
- Ernie Adams as Pawnbroker
- Eddie Kane as Warburton
- Nelson Leigh as Wiffle, Makeup Artist
- Robert Homans as Police Officer Conlon

== See also ==
- List of American films of 1944

== Bibliography ==
- Hischak, Thomas H. The Oxford Companion to the American Musical: Theatre, Film, and Television. Oxford University Press, 2008.
- Hurst, Richard M. Republic Studios: Beyond Poverty Row and the Majors. Scarecrow Press, 2007.
