= Glamour (1934 film) =

1934 American film directed by William Wyler

- Film poster
- Directed by: William Wyler
- Written by: Doris Anderson
- Produced by: B.F. Zeidman
- Starring: Paul Lukas; Constance Cummings; Phillip Reed
- Cinematography: George Robinson
- Edited by: Ted J. Kent
- Music by: Howard Jackson
- Production company: Universal Pictures
- Distributed by: Universal Pictures
- Release date: April 9, 1934
- Running time: 74 minutes
- Country: United States
- Language: English

Glamour is a 1934 American Pre-Code drama film directed by William Wyler and starring Paul Lukas, Constance Cummings and Phillip Reed.

== Plot ==
An ambitious chorus girl marries an up-and-coming composer.

== Cast ==
- Paul Lukas as Victor Banki
- Constance Cummings as Linda Fayne
- Phillip Reed as Lorenzo Valenti
- Joseph Cawthorn as Ibsen
- Doris Lloyd as Nana
- Lyman Williams as Forsyth
- Phil Tead as Jimmy
- Luis Alberni as Monsieur Paul
- Yola d'Avril as Renee
- Alice Lake as Secretary
- Louise Beavers as Millie
- Wilson Benge as Pritchard, the Butler
- Lita Chevret as Grassie
- Olaf Hytten as Dobbs
- Grace Hayle as Miss Lang
- May Beatty as Journalist
- Claire Du Brey as Nurse
- C. Montague Shaw as Throat Doctor
- Sheila Bromley as Chorus Girl
- Lois January as Chorus Girl

== Reception ==
The film was a box-office disappointment for Universal.

== Preservation status ==
UCLA archive and Library of Congress are in possession of prints.
