= Ice-Capades =

1941 film by Joseph Santley

- Directed by: Joseph Santley
- Written by: Isabel Dawn; Boyce DeGaw; Jack Townley; Robert Harari; Olive Cooper
- Produced by: Robert North
- Starring: James Ellison; Phil Silvers; Barbara Jo Allen; Renie Riano
- Cinematography: Jack A. Marta
- Edited by: Howard O'Neill
- Music by: Cy Feuer
- Production company: Republic Pictures
- Distributed by: Republic Pictures
- Release date: August 20, 1941
- Running time: 88 minutes
- Country: United States
- Language: English

Ice-Capades is a 1941 American comedy film directed by Joseph Santley and starring James Ellison, Phil Silvers, and Barbara Jo Allen. Its score, composed by Cy Feuer, was nominated for the Best Scoring of a Musical Picture. The film's sets were designed by the art director John Victor Mackay. It marked the screen debuts for the ice skaters Belita and Vera Ralston, both of whom went on to star in a number of films at Monogram and Republic respectively.

== Plot ==
Bob Clemens is a cameraman for newsreels. Assigned to shoot the Swiss ice skater Karen Vadja, he arrives too late, so decides to film a woman skating on a different New York rink and pass her off as Karen.

The scheme backfires when promoter Larry Herman takes a look at Bob's film and decides to make the skater a star. Unfortunately, it's actually amateur (and illegal immigrant) Marie Bergin in the newsreel footage, not the great figure skater from Switzerland. Chaos ensues as Bob tries to straighten everybody out.

== Cast ==
- James Ellison as Bob Clemens
- Phil Silvers as Larry Herman
- Renie Riano as Karen Vadja
- Alan Mowbray as Pete Ellis
- Jerry Colonna as Colonna
- Dorothy Lewis as Marie Bergin
- Barbara Jo Allen as Vera Vague
- Gus Schilling as Dave
- Tim Ryan as Jackson
- Harry Clark as Reed
- Carol Adams as Helen
- Vera Ralston as Ice Capades Skater
- Belita as Ice Capades Skater
- Megan Taylor as Ice Capades Skater
- Edward Gargan as Joe, the Bouncer
- William Newell as Harry Stimson
- Edwin Stanley as Lawyer
- Howard Hickman as Lawyer
- Lois Collier as Audition Girl
- Sally Cairns as Audition Girl
- Lynn Merrick as Audition Girl

== See also ==
- Ice Capades
- Ice-Capades Revue
- "Nice-Capades"
