= Doctors Don't Tell =

1941 film by Jacques Tourneur

- Theatrical release poster
- Directed by: Jacques Tourneur
- Screenplay by: Theodore Reeves; Isabel Dawn
- Story by: Theodore Reeves
- Produced by: Albert J. Cohen
- Starring: John Beal; Florence Rice; Edward Norris; Ward Bond
- Cinematography: Ernest Miller
- Edited by: Edward Mann
- Music by: Cy Feuer
- Production company: Republic Pictures Corp.
- Distributed by: Republic Pictures Corp.
- Release date: 27 August 1941
- Country: United States
- Budget: $760,000

Doctors Don't Tell is a 1941 American drama film directed by Jacques Tourneur and written by Theodore Reeves and Isabel Dawn. The film stars John Beal, Florence Rice, Edward Norris, Ward Bond, Douglas Fowley and Grady Sutton.

== Plot ==
Med student Ralph Sawyer operates on Diana Wayne, victim of a vehicular accident, saving her life. Later, Sawyer opens a medical practice with buddies Frank Blake and Peter Piper. Even though Sawyer woos Diana, she falls for Blake.

Blake purchases some much-needed medical supplies on the black market from scarred gangster Joe Grant and his bodyguard, Barney Millen. When Millen is shot during a shake-down attempt, Blake cares for him. Millen is arrested and Blake defends him at trial, claiming he fixed an acid burn and not a gunshot wound. Sawyer, who has a side job working for the medical examiner's office, discovers that most of his clients are thugs sent to the doctor's office by Joe Grant. He realizes that Blake lied in court.

Grant murders the shake-down victim, who tells the cops before he dies that a "man with a scar on his face" shot him. Grant forces Blake to remove Grant's facial scar or get exposed as a gangland doctor. Blake does so, but takes photos of the operation that documents what he's done. Diana walks in as the surgery is ending, and realizes her beau is in league with a criminal element.

Grant goes on trial. Blake sends his photos to Sawyer, who is forced by a judge to admit that Blake was the source of the images. Blake, realizing his future is finished no matter what, testifies in court against Grant. Grant is found guilty, and Millen shoots Blake when he leaves the courtroom. Millen himself is then killed by the cops. Sawyer, Piper, and Diana mourn Blake.

== Cast ==
- John Beal as Dr. Ralph Sawyer
- Florence Rice as Diana Wayne
- Edward Norris as Dr. Frank Blake
- Ward Bond as Barney Millen
- Douglas Fowley as Joe Grant
- Grady Sutton as Dr. Piper
- Bill Shirley as Tom Wayne
- Joseph Crehan as Judge Hoskins
- Paul Porcasi as Montez
- Russell Hicks as Supt. Duff
- Howard Hickman as Dr. Watkins

== Production ==
The Hollywood Reporter stated that the film has been on Republic Pictures schedule for about two years before it went into production. The film's opening credits state it was taken from a Liberty magazine story, but the screenplay Theodore Reeves and Isabel Dawn are original with only the title of the magazine article being used for the film.

Production began on the film in July 1941. How director Jacques Tourneur became involved in the development of Doctors Don't Tell is unknown. The films editor Edward Mann was allowed to film additional scenes in early August 1941.

== Release ==
Doctors Don't Tell was distributed by Republic Pictures and was released on August 27, 1941. Various running times are given to the film, ranging from 53, 65 and 67 minutes. The film's rights are currently held by Paramount Pictures, who acquired the Republic library in the 1990s.

== Reception ==
On discussing the film, Tourneur declared "I detest this film; it's my worst." Chris Fujiwara discussed the film in his book Nightfall: The Cinema of Jacques Tourneur, declared the film as "routine and banal", concluding it as the "antitheseis of the richly textured, subtle work that Tourneur had already shown he could do on a small budget"
