= Stop! Look! Listen! =

1915 musical

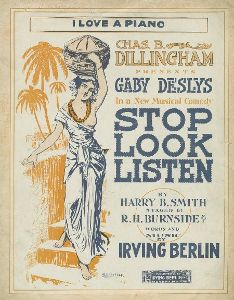
- Original sheet music to "I Love A Piano", a song from "Stop! Look! Listen!"
- Music: Irving Berlin
- Lyrics: Irving Berlin
- Book: Harry B. Smith
- Productions: 1915 Broadway

Stop! Look! Listen! is a musical in three acts with music and lyrics by Irving Berlin and book by Harry B. Smith. The piece had additional music by Henry Kailimai and Jack Alau and additional lyrics by G. H. Stover and Sylvester Kalama.

Stop! Look! Listen! opened on Broadway at the Globe Theatre on Christmas Day, 1915, and ran for 105 performances. The revue was produced by Charles Dillingham and directed by R.H. Burnside. The music director was Robert Hood Bowers, and Robert McQuinn designed the sets and costumes.

== Synopsis ==
Gaby, a young chorine, is determined to get the leading part in her current musical after the star, Mary Singer, was whisked away to Honolulu by her suitor, Gideon Gay, but Gaby is rejected by the show's creative team. She meets agent Abel Conner who agrees to help her, and they decide to trail the creative team to Honolulu where they are searching for a new star. Once everyone arrives in Honolulu, various farcical goings-on ensue to allow for specialties and songs, resulting in the creative team allowing Gaby to star in their show.

== Musical numbers ==
Act I

- Blow Your Horn – Owen Coyne and Girls
- Give Us a Chance – Gaby and Girls
- I Love to Dance – Gaby, Anthony St. Anthony and Chorus
- And Father Wanted Me to Learn a Trade – Abel Connor
- The Girl on the Magazine – Van Cortland Parke and Magazine Girls (4 Seasons)
- I Love a Piano – Abel Connor and Ensemble

Act II

- The Hula Hula (That Hula Hula) – Ensemble
- A Pair of Ordinary Coons – Rob Ayers and Frank Steele
- When I'm Out With You – Gaby, Van Cortland Parke and Ensemble
- On the Beach at Waiki-ki (music by Henry Kailimai; lyrics by G. H. Stover) – Hawaiian Octette
- One-Two-Three-Four (music by Jack Alau; lyrics by Sylvester Kalama) – Hawaiian Octette
- Take Off a Little Bit – Gaby and Girls
- Teach Me How to Love – Willie Chase and Vera Gay
- The Law Must Be Obeyed – Rob Ayers and Frank Steele
- Ragtime Melodrama – Principals and Ensemble

Act III

- When I Get Back to the U.S.A. – Van Cortland Parke and Ensemble
- Stop! Look! Listen! – Owen Coyne, Gideon Gay, Rob Ayers, Frank Steele, Abel Connor and Van Cortland Parke
- I'll Be Coming Home with a Skate On – Anthony St. Anthony
- Everything in America Is Ragtime – Gaby

== Reception ==
Green Book Magazine, January, 1916:

Sherlock Holmes couldn't find a plot in "Stop! Look! Listen!" the new Irving Berlin revue at the Globe. In comparison, "Watch Your Step" was a novel by Alexandre Dumas. This libretto merely pieces together some lively vaudeville, with tunes and ideas from Berlin, each scene being but preamble to a song, and each song preface to the particular "stunt" it introduces. To me, with the weakness already confessed, the piece suffers from general absence of destination, and from a considerable superfluity of articulate chorus girls. But I am a minority, and worse than that, I have lost my enthusiasm for legs.

Certainly there is no gainsaying the liveliness—the appropriate term, I believe, is "pep"—of "Stop! Look! Listen!" or the number of clever people and things in the performance. Foremost among the former are Harry Fox, who never appeared to better advantage, and a very interesting dance team, known to the varieties as Doyle & Dixon. Then there are Tempest & Sunshine; Blossom Seeley; Joseph Santley, also at his best; Helen Barnes, giving promise in her first part; and Justine Johnstone, who represents the farina-pudding school of art. Finally, to obey the implied injunction that the first shall be last, there is Gaby Deslys. Mr. Fox tells The Lady of the Lilies, "I think you're clever," and Mr. Fox is entitled to his opinion, but it isn't ours. To us, Mile. Deslys always has seemed quite an ordinary French soubrette, full of gurgles, gasps and aspirations. Here, however, she does two rather remarkable dances—one with Mr. Santley and one with Harry Pilcer —and wears some astounding costumes, including a hat that looks as though its plumage had been lifted from a pink hearse.

Mr. Berlin's lyrics are characteristic. There is real humor in a chorus of men's dressmakers, who are "glad you left it all to Percy! Oh, Mercy!" One's nerves weren't prepared, however, for "Don't be nervous. I'm here at your service!" The Berlin music shows the effect of overproduction, lacking freshness and inspiration, but this doesn't keep successive audiences from succumbing to the syncopation. Everybody's doing it at "Stop! Look! Listen!" even though the composer may be overdoing it! Mr. Berlin's "stunts" are as ingenious and entertaining as ever. There is a song, "I Love a Piano," strikingly reminiscent of "Alexander's Rag-time Band," accompanied by eight men at as many pianos, the effect of which is not less striking because the thing was done at a Friars' Frolic. A Vogue cover opens and closes to show six beautiful girls in six beautiful gowns; there is a cleverly contrived policeman's dance, programmed "The Law Must Be Obeyed;" and to take the place of the rag-time grand opera in "Watch Your Step," there is a rag-time melodrama.

R. H. Burnside's contribution to all this is some exceptionally interesting "business" and some attractive grouping. Ernest Albert and Homer Emens painted the two most wonderful of nine wonderful scenes, and the dresses, particularly those worn by the chorus in a song called "The Hula Hula," beggar description. Altogether, here is a quick and diverting entertainment, none the less sure of success because its words and music are not 'way above par.

At the Globe you must stop and look, but it isn't at all important that you listen!

== Roles and original cast ==
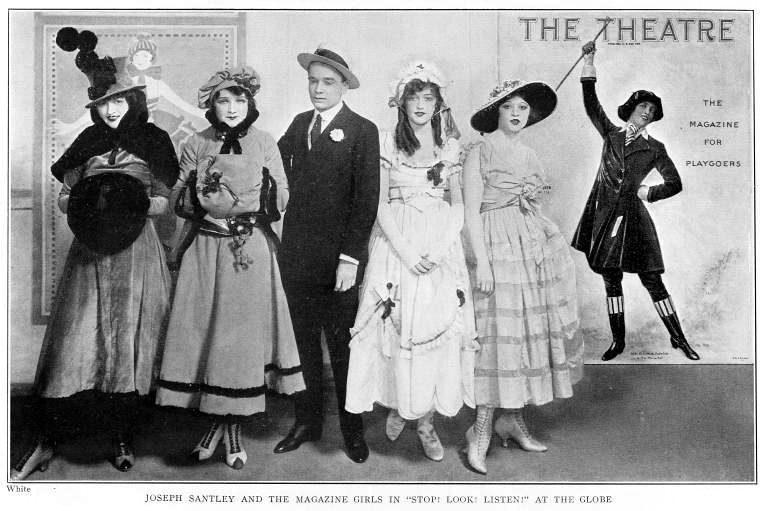
Photo from The Theatre magazine, February 1916: Joseph Santley (in Stop! Look! Listen!) with The Theatre magazine girls.

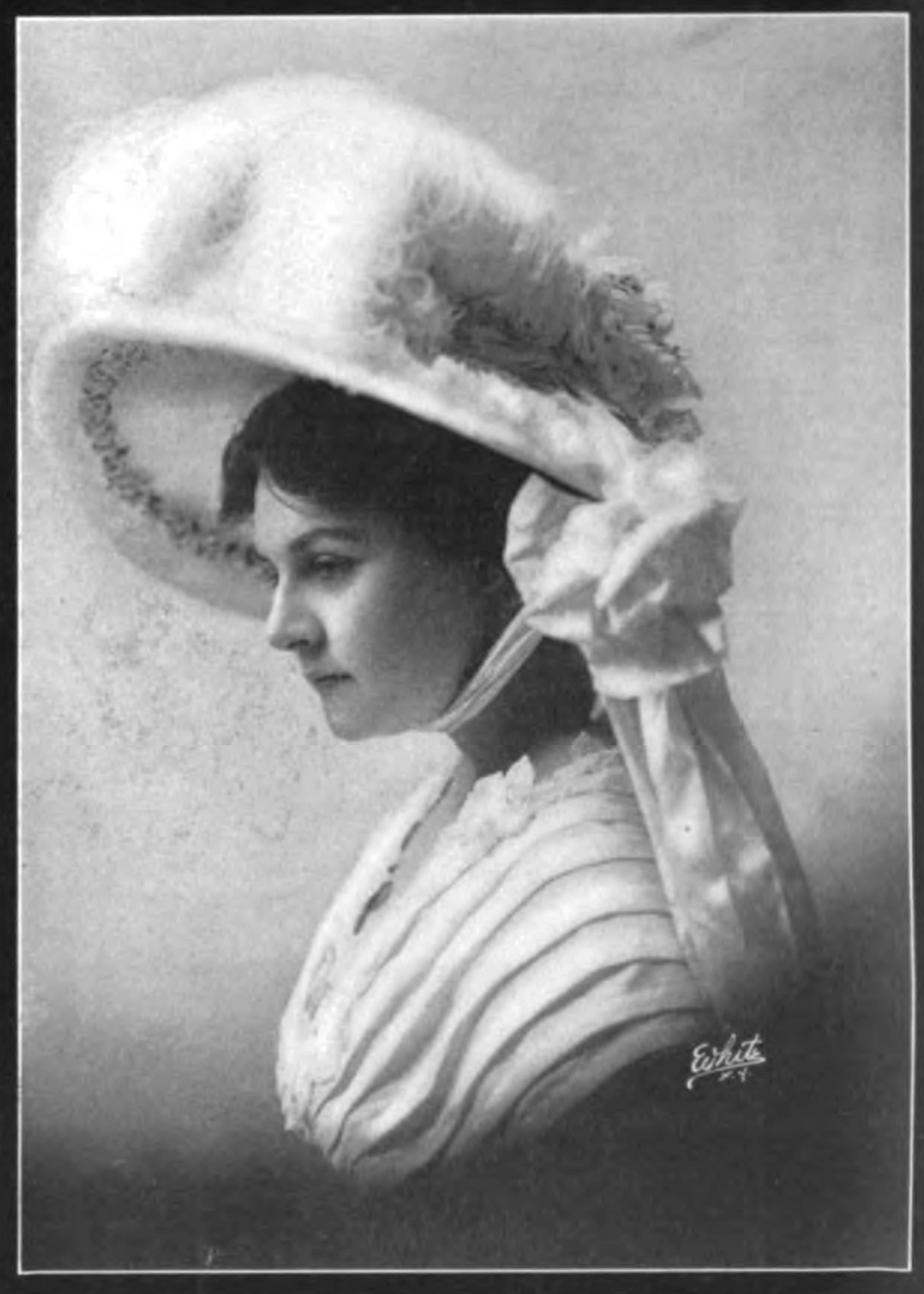
The American actress and singer Eva Francis.

- Frank Lalor: Gideon Gay
- Justine Johnstone: Mary Singer
- James Doyle: Rob Ayers
- Harland Dixon: Frank Steele
- Eva Francis: Mary Brown
- Gaby Deslys: Violette/Gaby
- Harry Fox: Abel Connor
- Helen Barnes: Lotta Nichols
- Joseph Santley: Van Cortland Parke
- Florence Tempest: Willie Chase
- Marion Sunshine: Vera Gay
- Marion Harris: Marion Bright
- Harry Pilcer: Anthony St. Anthony
- Julia Beaubien: Helen Winter
- Hazel Lewis: Winter
- Eleanor St. Clair: Spring
- Marion Davies: Summer
- Evelyn Conway: Autumn
- Florence Morrison: Mrs. Singer
- Blossom Seeley: Lilla Kiliana
- Renee Smythe: Gladys Canby
- Ethel Sykes: Carrie Waite
- Walter Wills: Owen Coyne
