= Oh, My Dear! =

Musical composed by Louis A. Hirsch

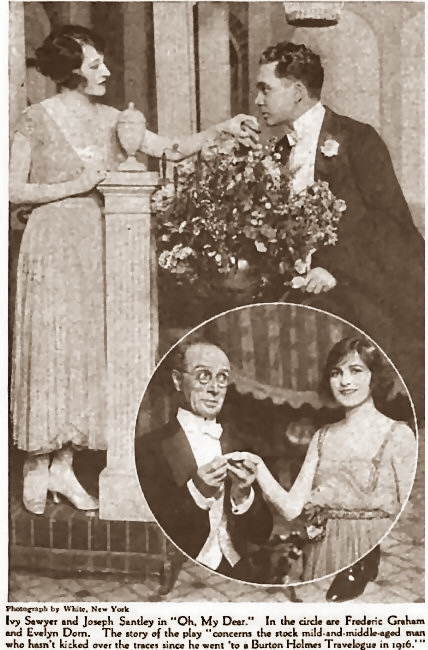
Oh, My Dear! (top) Ivy Sawyer with Joseph Santley, (circle) Frederic Graham and Evelyn Dorn Green Book Magazine, 1919

Oh, My Dear! was a musical comedy in two acts with book and lyrics by Guy Bolton and P. G. Wodehouse, and music by Louis A. Hirsch. It premiered under the direction of Robert Milton and Edward Royce at the Princess Theatre on Broadway on November 27, 1918, produced by William Elliott and F. Ray Comstock and ran for 189 performances, closing on May 10, 1919. The story takes place at Dr. Rockett's Health Farm in the State of New York.

== Reviews ==
A review in Music Trades on December 5, 1918, stated:

Like its musical comedy predecessors at the Princess Theatre, "Oh, My Dear!" is tastefully costumed, daintily mounted, and calculated to appeal to a large percentage of the public which made the previous O-perettas so popular. The basis of its comedy, aside from an occasional well-turned phrase, is the familiar theory that there is nothing so funny as a married man, unless it be two of them. It was to preserve domestic peace that the proprietor of a health resort was obliged to introduce the impeccable Joseph Santley as a young man with a Broadway reputation—not altogether a new situation— and it was to sustain that falsehood that a number of others had to be evolved. And so grew the plot, embellished from time to time with such musical-comedy observations as "Husbands are like dollar watches— you're darned lucky to get them guaranteed for one year."

Another in Green Book Magazine in January 1919 commented:

During twenty-five years of theatergoing one learns that there are two kinds of musical comedies—the "low-brow" sort, and those in which the girls aren't seen for ten minutes after the curtain rises. The exclamatory school presented at the Princess runs to cleverness rather than to comeliness, but the cleverest of librettists, lyric-writers and composers grow weary and a trifle stale, and so it happens that "Oh, My Dear!" lacks some of the freshness and sparkle of "Oh, Boy!" and "Oh, Lady! Lady!!" Guy Bolton's book is rather more frankly than usual of the scrap variety; P. G. Wodehouse's rhymes are not so startlingly felicitous; and Louis A. Hirsch's music, though pleasant to take, has a somewhat familiar flavor. The story concerns the stock mild-and middle-aged married man who hasn't kicked over the traces since he sneaked off "to a Burton Holmes Travelogue in 1916," and who gets himself into the stock complications by inducing someone to pass himself off as someone he isn't. Then the wife of the someone he isn't turns up, and we come to the stock situation in which a man and a woman who have been but casually acquainted are assigned to occupy the same chamber. This tangle is unraveled by a company including Frederic Graham, Roy Atwell, Joseph Allen, Ivy Sawyer, Joseph Santley, Georgia Caine and Juliette Day. "I Wonder Whether," "Our City of Dreams" and "You Never Know" are the best of the song numbers. In comparison, "Oh, My Dear!" suffers chiefly by being set beside its predecessors at the Princess—it is announced as "the sixth annual New York Princess Theater musical comedy production."

== Cast and crew ==
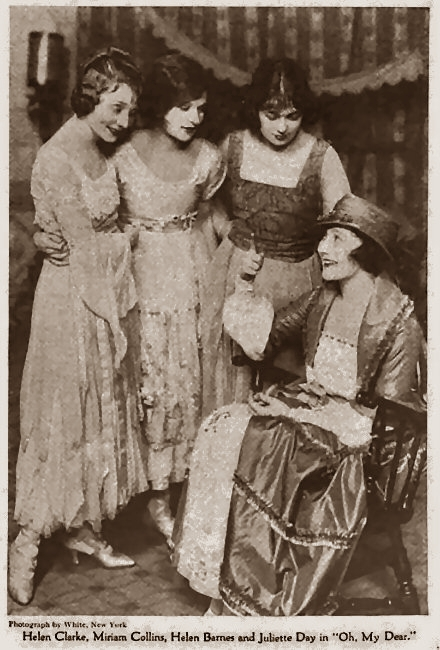
(L-R) Helen Clarke, Miriam Collins, Helen Barnes and Juliette Day - Green Book Magazine, 1919

- Musical Director: Max Hirschfeld
- Additional Music: Jean Schwartz
- Songs: Jerome Kern, Benjamin Hapgood Burt and Roy Atwell
- Scenic Design: Robert Milton
- Costume Design: Harry Collins
- Men's clothes: Designed by Croydon, Ltd
- Joseph Allen: Bagshott
- Roy Atwell: Broadway Willie Burbank
- Dorothy Bailey: Miss Beekman
- Helen Barnes: Georgie Van Alstyne
- Marjorie Bentley: Grace Spelvin
- Georgia Caine: Mrs. Rockett
- Clara Carroll: Miss Lennox
- Gene Carroll: Miss Schuyler
- Frances Chase: Miss Stuyvesant
- Helen Clarke: Babe
- Miriam Collins: Pickles
- Francis X. Conlan: Joe Plummer
- Juliette Day: Jennie Wren
- Evelyn Dorn: Hazel
- Sven Erick: Neal Clarke
- Robert Gebhardt : Harry Coppins
- Patricia Gordon: Miss Barclay
- Frederic Graham: Dr. Rockett
- Dorothy La Rue: Miss Bryant
- Alfa Lanee: Miss Audobon
- Victor Le Roy: Willie Love
- Rene Manning: Miss Franklin
- Florence McGuire: Nan Hatton
- Victoria Miles: Miss Rhinelander
- Bessie More: Miss Cortlandt
- Joseph Santley: Bruce Allenby
- Ivy Sawyer: Hilda Rockett
- Jennifer Sinclair: Miss Greeley
- Jacques Stone: Frank Lynn
