= Ivy Sawyer =

British-American singer, dancer, and actress (1898-1999

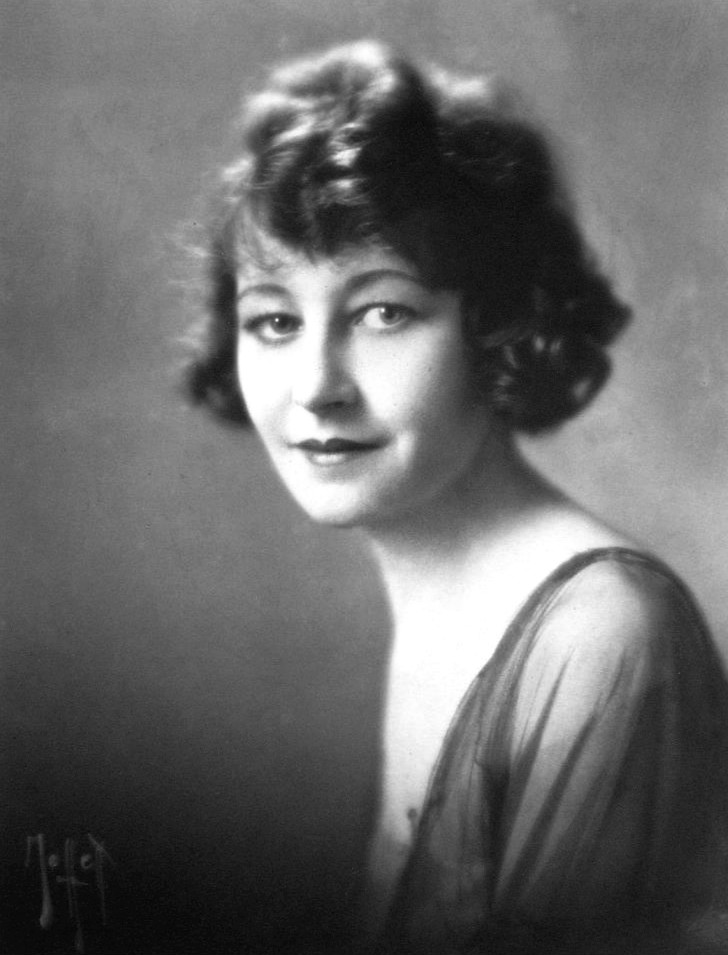
Sawyer in 1920.

Ivy Winifred Sawyer (February 13, 1898 – November 16, 1999) was a British-born American cabaret and ballroom dancer, singer, and stage actress.

The London-born Sawyer, daughter of Alfred and Emma R. (Malcolm) Sawyer, danced professionally with John Jarrot until she met and married fellow dancer/actor Joseph Santley. The two would dance and perform on stage together primarily in musical comedies for nearly two decades.

They made their Broadway debut together in 1916 in Betty at the Globe Theatre and two years later played in the musical comedy Oh, My Dear! at the Princess Theatre.

The couple appeared in the famous Irving Berlin Music Box Revues of the 1920s and later toured the United States, performing at major venues such as the National Theatre in Washington, D.C.

== Personal life ==
Where their dancing career ended, they moved to Los Angeles, California, where her husband became a director of musical comedy films. They had three children.

Ivy Sawyer-Santley was widowed in 1971 and died in California in 1999 at the age of 101.
