= Ice-Capades Revue =

1942 film by Bernard Vorhaus

- Directed by: Bernard Vorhaus
- Screenplay by: Bradford Ropes; Gertrude Purcell
- Story by: Robert T. Shannon; Mauri Grashin
- Produced by: Robert North
- Starring: Ellen Drew; Richard Denning; Jerry Colonna; Barbara Jo Allen; Harold Huber; Marilyn Hare
- Cinematography: John Alton
- Edited by: Thomas Richards
- Production company: Republic Pictures
- Distributed by: Republic Pictures
- Release date: December 24, 1942
- Running time: 79 minutes
- Country: United States
- Language: English

Ice-Capades Revue is a 1942 American comedy film directed by Bernard Vorhaus, and written by Bradford Ropes and Gertrude Purcell. The film stars Ellen Drew, Richard Denning, Jerry Colonna, Barbara Jo Allen, Harold Huber and Marilyn Hare. The film was released on December 24, 1942, by Republic Pictures.

== Plot ==
With her Massachusetts farm in debt, Ann Porter is amazed to hear a deceased uncle has bequeathed her his estate. When she and Aunt Nellie go to New York City to claim the inheritance, it turns out to be an ice-skating rink in rundown condition.

Jeff Stewart advises her to sell to ice-follies owner Duke Baldwin, but since Duke is a gangster who put her uncle out of business, Ann's not interested. She takes her skating troupe back to her farm's frozen pond and stages a show outdoors for friends and neighbors to see. A nutty professor, Theophilus J. Twitchell, is encountered by Nellie and vows to finance Ann's next show.

Jeff tries to make amends. He learns that Twitchell's "fortune" comes from a radio contest he intends to win. Jeff fixes it so that he secretly funds the professor's winnings. Duke tries to persuade Ann that he's still got Jeff in his pocket, but she sees through it and joins forces with Jeff to stage an all-new revue.

== Cast ==
- Ellen Drew as Ann Porter
- Richard Denning as Jeff Stewart
- Jerry Colonna as Theophilus J. Twitchell
- Barbara Jo Allen as Aunt Nellie
- Harold Huber as Duke Baldwin
- Marilyn Hare as Bubbles
- Bill Shirley as Denny
- Pierre Watkin as Wiley Stone
- Si Jenks as Homer
- Sam Bernard as Snake Eyes
- George Byron as Master of Ceremonies
- Vera Ralston as Ice-Capades Skater
- Megan Taylor as Ice-Capades Skater
- Lois Dworshak as Ice-Capades Skater
- Donna Atwood as Ice-Capades Skater
- Robert Dench as Ice-Capades Skater
- Rosemarie Stewart as Ice-Capades Skater
- Larry Jackson as Ice-Capades Skater
- Bernard Lynam as Ice-Capades Skater
- Red McCarthy as Ice-Capades Skater
- Phil Taylor as Ice-Capades Skater
- Joe Jackson Jr. as Ice-Capades Skater
- Eric Waite as Ice-Capades Skater
- Robin Lee as Ice-Capades Skater
- Babs Savage as Ice-Capades Skater
