= Isabel Dawn =

American actress and screenwriter

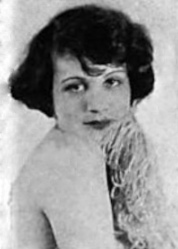
- Born: Isabel Lydia Seitz; October 20, 1897; Evansville, Indiana, US
- Died: June 29, 1966 (aged 68); Woodland Hills, California, US
- Resting place: Forest Lawn Cemetery
- Occupations: Actress, screenwriter

Isabel Dawn (born Isabel Lydia Seitz; October 20, 1897 – June 29, 1966) was an American screenwriter, actress, and journalist active primarily in the 1930s and 1940s.

== Biography ==
Born in Evansville, Indiana, to John Seitz and Viola Wright, Isabel worked at newspapers like The Evansville Courier and The Kokomo Dispatch and attended Valparaiso University before moving to New York City. Around this time, she married her first husband, Thomas Goss.

While in New York City, she and a fellow playwright were hit by a taxi; she spent a good deal of time in the hospital recovering. Her writing partner did not make it.

She appeared in a number of stage plays, radio plays, and films in New York and Los Angeles prior to her 1934 marriage to screenwriter Boyce DeGaw. She and DeGaw collaborated on a number of scripts together before divorcing around 1941. She later married Ray Herr.

Many of her screenplays were written for Republic Pictures; she frequently worked with director Joseph Santley.

She died in Woodland Hills, California, at the age of 66.

== Selected filmography ==
- If I Had a Million (1932)
- Don't Bet on Blondes (1935)
- The Moon's Our Home (1936)
- Wings Over Honolulu (1937)
- The Girl of the Golden West (1938)
- Behind the News (1940)
- Doctors Don't Tell (1941)
- A Man Betrayed (1941)
- A Tragedy at Midnight (1942)
- Yokel Boy (1942) (a.k.a. Hitting the Headlines)
- Remember Pearl Harbor (1942)
- Goodnight, Sweetheart (1944)
- Give and Take (1946)
