= Don't Bet on Blondes =

1935 film by Robert Florey

- Directed by: Robert Florey
- Written by: Isabel Dawn; Boyce DeGaw
- Produced by: Samuel Bischoff
- Starring: Warren William; Guy Kibee
- Cinematography: William Rees
- Edited by: Thomas Richards
- Music by: Leo F. Forbstein
- Distributed by: Warner Bros. Pictures
- Release date: July 13, 1935
- Running time: 59 minutes
- Country: United States
- Language: English

Don't Bet on Blondes is a 1935 American romantic comedy film.

== Plot ==
When top Broadway bookmaker Odds Owen loses $50,000 on a horse owned by Everett Markham, he investigates and finds out that the horse was doped. Owen visits Everett and lets him know that Everett will be selling his horses and paying back the $50,000.

Owen is inspired by hearing about Lloyd's of London. He decides to go into the business of underwriting unusual insurance policies.

Everett is a friend to actress Marilyn Youngblood. Marilyn supports her ne’er do well father, Colonel Youngblood, and she is dating rich playboy Dwight Boardman who is also a hypochondriac. Everett convinces Marilyn's father to take out a 3-year insurance policy against Marilyn getting married. If she gets married within three years, her father gets 50,000. Owen agrees to insure the policy.

Owen's men get rid of Dwight by convincing him that marriage could kill someone with a weak heart.

Marilyn starts seeing David Van Dusen. Owen's men go to the restaurant where Marilyn and Van Dusen are eating and pretend to be shady characters who know Van Dusen. One of them walks by and hands Van Dusen an envelope with money. Another hands him a gun wrapped in a handkerchief. Marilyn, convinced he is a gangster, breaks up with him.

Marilyn notices Owen nearby and remarks on how strange it is to see him again when she is breaking up with someone. Owen is attracted to Marilyn and starts dating her, ostensibly to keep her from dating anyone else.

Marilyn's father tells her about the insurance policy. She decides to make Owen fall for her and he does. To get back at Owen, Marilyn becomes engaged to Everett. Now Everett will have his revenge. Owen will lose $50,000 and Marilyn. Owen tells Everett he will not welch but he does not think Everett will marry Marilyn. Owen has fallen in love with her, placing him in a dilemma, caught between the heart and the wallet.

Marilyn's father begs Owen to stop the wedding. Marilyn, at the church, is hoping the same thing. Everett does not show up for the wedding. Owen appears in his place and Marilyn happily marries him. Owen's men pay off dozens of cabbies who have caused a traffic jam which prevented Everett from getting to the church.

== Cast ==
- Warren William as Oscar Owen
- Claire Dodd as Marilyn Youngblood
- Guy Kibbee as Colonel Youngblood
- William Gargan as Numbers
- Vince Barnett as Chuck aka 'Brains'
- Hobart Cavanaugh as Philbert O. Slemp
- Clay Clement as T. Everett Markham
- Errol Flynn as David Van Dusen
- Spencer Charters as Doc
- Walter Byron as Dwight Boardman
- Eddie Shubert as Steve
- Jack Norton as J. Mortimer 'Mousy' Slade
- Mary Treen as Owen's secretary
- Maude Eburne as Little Ellen Purdy
- Herman Bing as Professor Friedrich Wilhelm Gruber
- George Chandler as Henry Purdy

== Production ==
The film was originally known as Not on Your Life and was always intended as a vehicle for Warren William. Dolores del Río was originally announced as female co star. She was eventually replaced by Claire Dodd. Walter Byron replaced George Meeker. Filming completed 13 May 1935.

Errol Flynn appears briefly playing a bit part in his fifth movie, and second in Hollywood, just before his break-through role in Captain Blood later that year. He made the movie shortly after his marriage to Lili Damita.

== Reception ==
The Los Angeles Times called it a "sparkling comedy" in which Warren William "again proves himself a delightful and suave comedian."

Filmink magazine said the main faults of the film were "the wonky structure, William’s flat performance, and the lack of chemistry between William and Dodd. It’s kind of a shame that Flynn didn’t get the chance to play the lead, as he would have been a lot better, even at that stage of his career."
