= Follow the Leader (TV series) =

- Genre: Game show
- Written by: Bernie Gould; Paul Harrison
- Directed by: John Claar
- Presented by: Vera Vague

Production
- Producers: Bernie Gould; Paul Harrison
- Running time: 30 minutes

Original release
- Network: CBS
- Release: July 7 – August 18, 1953

Follow the Leader is an American television prime-time game show that was broadcast July 7, 1953 - August 18, 1953, on CBS with Vera Vague as hostess. It was on Tuesdays from 9 to 9:30 p.m. Eastern Time,

== Premise ==
Follow the Leader was based on the children's game of the same name. Contestants selected from the studio audience tried to imitate scenes acted out by Vague in pantomime. Each correctly reproduced movement earned $10 for the contestant and added $10 to the jackpot for that episode. Contestants' efforts were complicated by addition of "exaggerated props" that were not in Vague's original activity. Episodes typically included three two-minute skits enacted by Vague, followed by contestants' efforts to re-enact them. In the premiere episode:

- Vague packed for a weekend trip, with the contestant "hindered by collapsing props".
- A man who tried to imitate Vague's skit about a private investigator also found props collapsing.
- A woman imitating Vague's Apache dance with a dummy discovered that the "dummy" she hit over the head with a bottle was a live actor.

An applause meter was used to determine which contestant would be invited to participate in the next episode.

== Production ==
The program originated from Hollywood, with Bernie Gould and Paul Harrison as producers and writers. John Claar was the director.

== Critical response ==
A review in the trade publication Broadcasting described Follow the Leader as "better than average audience participation fare". It noted that the program differed from most audience-participation shows in that "the game was the focal point" rather than the celebrity host or hostess.

Bob Lanigan, in a review in the Brooklyn Eagle, wrote, "Vera Vague's voice is one of her greatest theatrical assets". He felt that use of pantomime wasted that asset, with Vague's speaking limited to brief interviews with participants. He called the show's episodes "bits of TV mediocrity" in which "each sketch is a boring repetition of its predecessor."

Syndicated newspaper columnist John Crosby wrote about Follow the Leader: "wondering what the devil it's doing on television. Can't people play their own parlor games in some reasonable privacy?"
