= Barbara Jo Allen =

American actress (1906–1974)

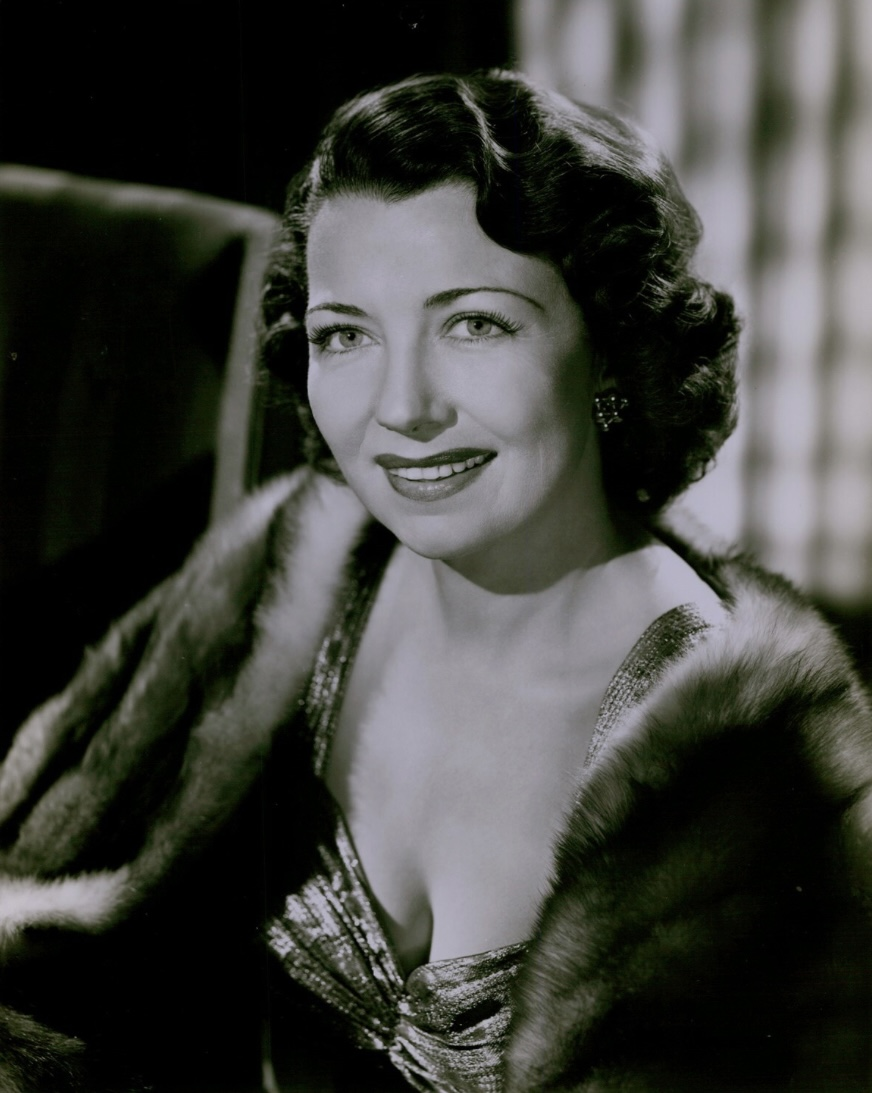
- Allen in 1954
- Born: Marian Barbara Henshall; September 2, 1906; Manhattan, New York, U.S.
- Died: September 14, 1974 (aged 68); Santa Barbara, California, U.S.
- Other name: Vera Vague
- Occupation: Actress
- Years active: 1920s-1963
- Spouses: Barton Yarborough (m. 1931; div. 1931); Charles H. Crosby (m. 1931; div. 1932); Norman Morrell (m. 1943)
- Children: 2

Barbara Jo Allen (born Marian Barbara Henshall; September 2, 1906 – September 14, 1974) was an American actress. She was also known as Vera Vague, the man-crazy spinster character she created and portrayed on radio and in films during the 1940s and 1950s. She based the character on a woman she had seen delivering a PTA literature lecture in a confused manner. As Vague, she popularized the catchphrase "You dear boy!"

== Early years ==
Allen was born on September 2, 1906, in Manhattan, New York, to Charles Thomas Henshall and Grace Esther Selby. Following her mother's death when Allen was 9, she went to live with an aunt and uncle in Los Angeles. She was educated at Los Angeles High School, UCLA, Stanford University, and the Sorbonne. Her acting ability first surfaced in school plays. Concentrating on language at the Sorbonne, she became proficient in French, Spanish, German, and Italian.

== Film, radio, and television ==
In 1933, Allen joined the cast of NBC's One Man's Family. In 1936 she became a regular on Signal Carnival, a weekly program on NBC's regional Pacific Red network; she left the Signal show in November 1941 to join Bob Hope's radio troupe.

In 1939 she was featured (as Barbara Jo Allen) in both the Leon Errol and Edgar Kennedy comedy shorts produced by RKO Radio Pictures.

From 1943 to 1952 (as Vera Vague) she made 16 two-reel comedies for Columbia Pictures. Two of them were nominated for Academy Awards as Best Short Subject: The Jury Goes Round 'N' Round (1945) and Hiss and Yell (1946).

During the summer of 1953, as Vera, she emceed an audience-participation series, Follow the Leader; it made its debut on July 7, 1953.

== Animation ==
She also did voices for animation, especially for the Walt Disney Animation Studios, most notably as the voice of Fauna, the green fairy, in Sleeping Beauty (1959), Goliath II's mother in Goliath II (1960), and the Scullery Maid in The Sword in the Stone (1963), her final film role.

== Recognition ==
Allen was the honorary mayor of Woodland Hills, California.

As Vera Vague, Allen has two stars on the Hollywood Walk of Fame, one for motion pictures at 1720 Vine Street and one for radio at 1639 Vine Street. Both were dedicated on February 8, 1960.

== Personal life ==
Allen's first marriage was to actor Barton Yarborough. They had one child together, Joan. Allen left Yarborough for millionaire lumber tycoon Charles Hooper Crosby; they were married on October 19, 1931, in Reno, Nevada, but the couple divorced after three months. She married advertising executive Norman Morrell (formerly the production manager of Bob Hope's radio show) in 1943.

Although Allen and Yarborough had separated in 1931, they continued to work together in One Man's Family. In 1946, they reunited for the two-reel comedy short Hiss and Yell.

== Death ==
Allen died from natural causes on September 14, 1974, aged 68, in Santa Barbara, California. She was cremated at Santa Barbara Cemetery on September 17 and her ashes were scattered in the Pacific Ocean.

== Filmography ==
Features:

- The Rookie Cop (1939) – Mrs. Thomas (uncredited)
- The Women (1939) – Receptionist (uncredited)
- Village Barn Dance (1940) – Vera
- Broadway Melody of 1940 (1940) – Ms. Konk (uncredited)
- Sing, Dance, Plenty Hot (1940) – Susan
- Melody and Moonlight (1940) – Adelaide Barnett
- Melody Ranch (1940) – Veronica Whipple
- The Mad Doctor (1941) – Louise Watkins
- Kiss the Boys Goodbye (1941) – Myra Stanhope
- Ice-Capades (1941) – Vera Vague
- Buy Me That Town (1941) – Henriette Teagarden
- Design for Scandal (1941) – Jane
- Larceny, Inc. (1942) – Mademoiselle Gloria
- Priorities on Parade (1942) – Mariposa Ginsbotham
- Hi, Neighbor (1942) – Vera Greenfield
- Mrs. Wiggs of the Cabbage Patch (1942) – Miss Tabitha Hazy
- The Palm Beach Story (1942) – Lady coming out of ladies room on train during the posse episode (uncredited)
- Ice-Capades Revue (1942) – Aunt Nellie
- Swing Your Partner (1943) – Vera Vague
- Get Going (1943) – Matilda Jones
- Cowboy Canteen (1944) – Vera Vague
- Moon Over Las Vegas (1944) – Auntie
- Henry Aldrich Plays Cupid (1944) – Mrs. Terwilliger a.k.a. Blue Eyes
- Rosie the Riveter (1944) – Vera Watson
- Girl Rush (1944) – Suzie Banks
- Lake Placid Serenade (1944) – Countess
- Snafu (1945) – Madge Stevens
- Earl Carroll Sketchbook (1946) – Sherry Lane
- Square Dance Katy (1950) – Gypsy Jones
- Mohawk (1956) – Aunt Agatha
- The Opposite Sex (1956) – Dolly DeHaven
- Sleeping Beauty (1959) – Fauna (voice)
- Born to Be Loved (1959) – Irene Hoffman
- The Sword in the Stone (1963) – Scullery Maid (voice) (final film role)

Short Subjects:

- Major Difficulties (1938)
- Moving Vanities (1939) – Mrs. Errol
- Ring Madness (1939) – Mrs. Errol
- Kennedy the Great (1939) – Mrs. John Potter
- Meet the Stars #1: Chinese Garden Festival (1940) – Vera Vague
- You Dear Boy (1943) – Vera
- Doctor, Feel My Pulse (1944) – Vera Vague
- Strife of the Party (1944) – Vera Clayton
- She Snoops to Conquer (1944) – Vera, the Reporter
- Screen Snapshots Series 24, No. 3 (1944) – Vera Vague
- The Jury Goes Round 'n' Round (1945) – Vera Vague
- Screen Snapshots: Radio Shows (1945) – Vera Vague
- Calling All Fibbers (1945) – Vera Vague
- Hiss and Yell (1946) – Vera Vague
- Headin' for a Weddin' (1946) – Vera Vague
- Reno-Vated (1946) – Vera Butts
- Cupid Goes Nuts (1947) – Vera Vague
- Screen Snapshots: Off the Air (1947) – Vera Vague
- Screen Snapshots: Smiles and Styles (1948) – Vera Vague
- Sitka Sue (1948, travelogue) – Vera Vague
- A Lass in Alaska (1948, travelogue) – Vera Vague
- A Miss in a Mess (1949) – Vera
- Clunked in the Clink (1949) – Vera Vague
- Wha' Happen? (1949) – Vera
- Clunked in the Clink (1949) – Vera Vague
- Nursie Behave (1950) – Vera Vague
- She Took a Powder (1951) – Vera Vague
- Happy Go Wacky (1952) – Vera Vague
- Screen Snapshots: Hollywood Life (1954) – Vera Vague
- Goliath II (1960) – Goliath II's Mother (voice, uncredited)
