= Follow the leader (game) =

Game

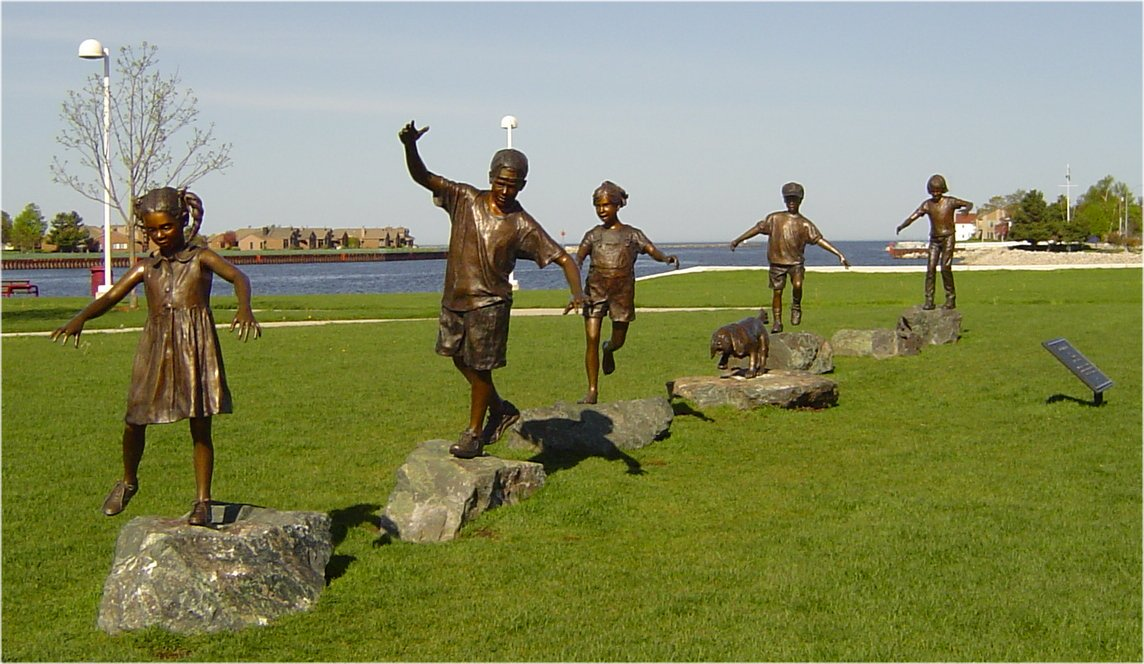
Sculpture called "Follow the Leader" in Ludington, Michigan harbor.

Follow the leader is a children's game. Players first choose a leader or "head of the line" and the remaining players (the followers) all line up behind the leader. The leader then moves around and all the players have to mimic the leader's actions. Any players who fail to follow or mimic the leader are out of the game. When only one follower remains, that player then becomes the new leader, and the game begins anew with all players joining the line once again.

== In popular culture ==
In 2007, Australian children's music group The Wiggles wrote a song "Follow the Leader" about the game for their album Getting Strong (Wiggle and Learn).

== See also ==
- List of traditional children's games
- Simon says
- Game of dares
- Tag
