= Joseph Santley =

Hollywood director and screenwriter (1890–1971)

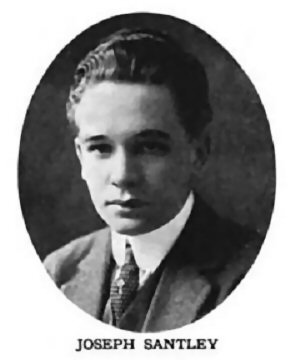
- Born: Joseph Ishmael Mansfield; January 10, 1890; Salt Lake City, Utah, U.S.
- Died: August 8, 1971 (aged 81); Los Angeles, California, U.S.
- Occupations: Actor; writer; singer; producer; director
- Spouse(s): Ivy Sawyer; 3 children

Joseph Mansfield Santley (born Joseph Ishmael Mansfield; January 10, 1890 – August 8, 1971) was an American actor, singer, dancer, writer, director, and producer of musical theatrical plays motion pictures and television shows. He adopted the stage name of his stepfather, actor Eugene Santley.

== Life and career ==
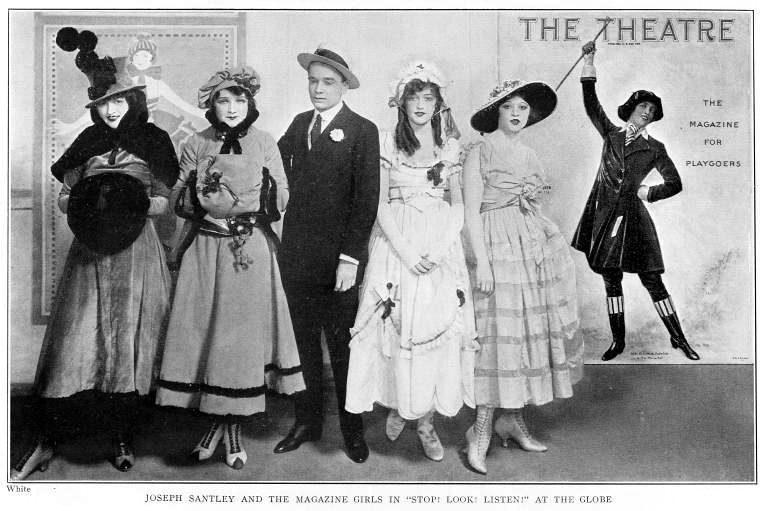
Joseph Santley (center) in Irving Berlin's Stop! Look! Listen! (1915)

Joseph Santley was born Joseph Ishmael Mansfield in Salt Lake City, Utah. His mother, Laurene Santley, was an actress. As a boy, he and older brother Fred began performing in live theatre appearing in summer stock and touring with their parents. In 1906, at age seventeen, Joseph Santley co-wrote and starred on Broadway in the play, Billy the Kid. In 1907, he acted in film for the first time for Sidney Olcott at the Kalem Company in a silent Western film short called The Pony Express.

Santley continued to work almost exclusively in musical comedy plays, returning to Broadway five more times as well as touring nationally. A gifted dancer and choreographer, Santley created the "Santley Tango" and the "Hawaiian Butterfly". He choreographed and starred in the 1913 Broadway musical When Dreams Come True by Silvio Hein and Philip Bartholomae; a piece written specifically for him.

He married actress/singer and cabaret dancer Ivy Sawyer in 1917. He and Sawyer had three children. The duo danced as a team, performing together in a number of Broadway musicals beginning with Betty and Oh, My Dear! and eventually other productions at major venues across the United States such as the National Theatre in Washington, D.C. Their final collective Broadway presentation was in 1927's Just Fancy, which Santley co-wrote, produced, and directed.

In 1928, Santley directed his first motion picture, a short talkie for Paramount Pictures that featured singer Ruth Etting. The next year, Paramount had Santley direct three more films that were short singing productions, one with Etting, another with crooner Rudy Vallee, plus a third titled High Hat with Broadway singing star Alice Boulden. He also directed A Ziegfeld Midnight Frolic, a musical film featuring Eddie Cantor along with Eddie Elkins and his orchestra.

All Americans (1929)

In 1929, Joseph Santley co-directed with Robert Florey the first Marx Brothers feature film, The Cocoanuts, a musical comedy for which he is most famous. Based on the George S. Kaufman play, and with music by Irving Berlin, the film was billed as "Paramount's All Talking-Singing Musical Comedy Hit." Santley also directed the musical short film, All Americans which featured song and dance numbers relating to nativism that arose in the 1920s.

His other notable directorial efforts include 1935's Harmony Lane, a biographical musical on the life of composer Stephen Foster. In 1940, he directed Melody Ranch starring "singing cowboy" Gene Autry. The film has been deemed "culturally significant" by the Library of Congress and selected for preservation in the United States National Film Registry.

During World War II, Santley worked for the war effort and in 1942 made the film Remember Pearl Harbor. In 1950, he made his last feature film but came back at age sixty-five to produce the 1954-55 television comedy The Mickey Rooney Show. In 1956, he put together two segments of Jazz Ball, a made-for-TV musical revue created from various filmed performances by jazz greats from the 1930s to the 1950s.

Joseph Santley died in 1971 in Los Angeles, survived by his wife and children.

== Partial filmography ==
- The Cocoanuts (1929)
- Swing High (1930)
- Young and Beautiful (1934)
- Million Dollar Baby (1934)
- Waterfront Lady (1935)
- Her Master's Voice (1936)
- Walking on Air (1936)
- She's Got Everything (1937)
- Always in Trouble (1938)
- Swing, Sister, Swing (1938)
- The Family Next Door (1939)
- Behind the News (1940)
- Ice-Capades (1940)
- Music in My Heart (1940)
- Melody Ranch (1940)
- Dancing on a Dime (1940)
- Down Mexico Way (1941)
- Remember Pearl Harbor (1942)
- Joan of Ozark (1942)
- Thumbs Up (1943)
- Sleepy Lagoon (1943)
- Jamboree (1944)
- Rosie the Riveter (1944)
- Hitchhike to Happiness (1945)
- Make Believe Ballroom (1949)
- When You're Smiling (1950)
