= List of American films of 1944 =

American films released in 1944

More than 400 American feature films were released in 1944. Going My Way won Best Picture at the 17th Academy Awards. The remaining four nominees were Double Indemnity, Gaslight, Since You Went Away and Wilson.

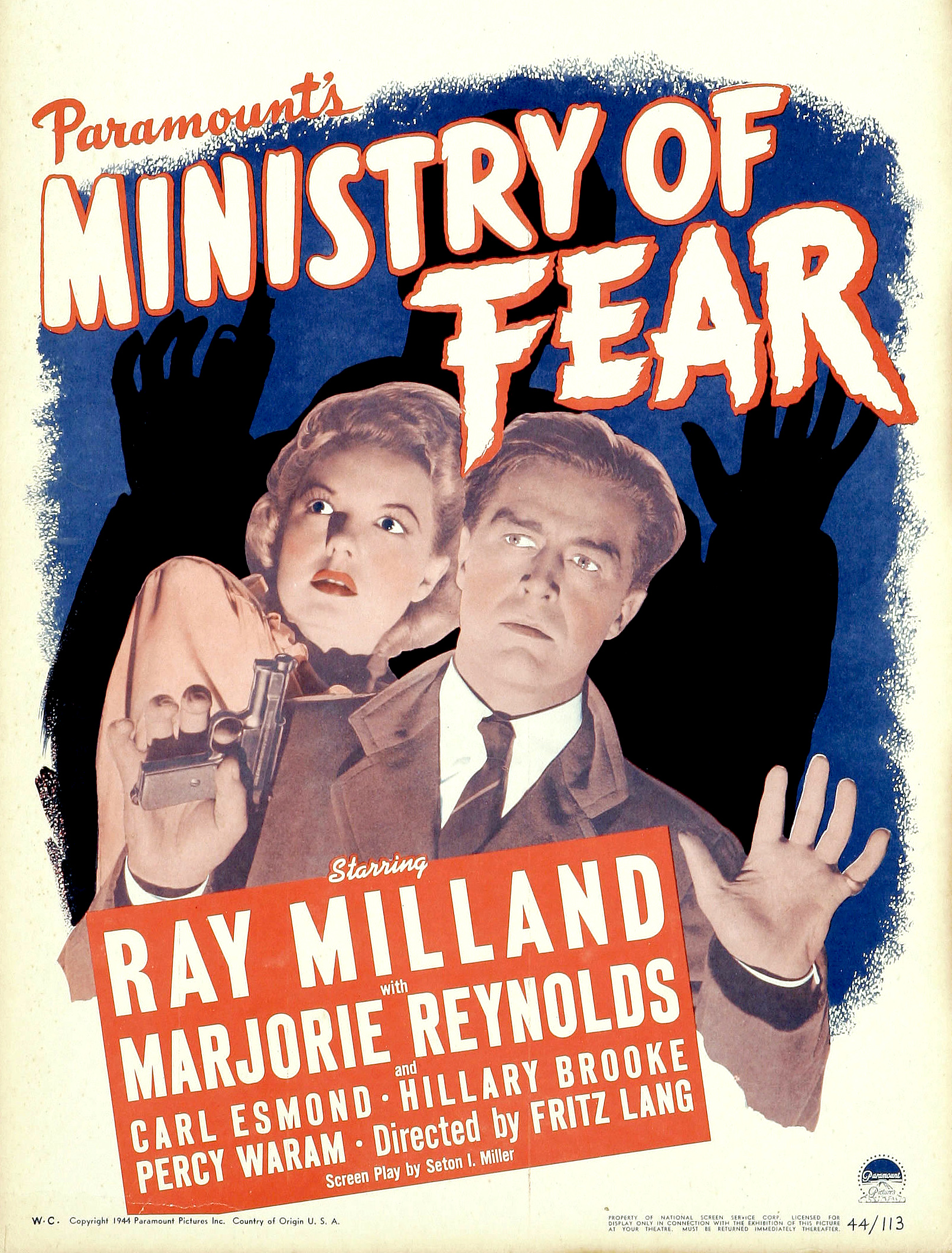
Ministry of Fear directed by Fritz Lang.

== A ==
Title	Director	Cast	Genre	Notes
Abroad with Two Yanks	Allan Dwan	William Bendix, Helen Walker, Dennis O'Keefe	Comedy	United Artists
Accent on Crime	Albert Herman	June Carlson, Fifi D'Orsay, Teala Loring	Crime drama	PRC
Action in Arabia	Leonide Moguy	George Sanders, Virginia Bruce, Lenore Aubert	Spy thriller	RKO
Address Unknown	William Cameron Menzies	Mady Christians, Morris Carnovsky, Paul Lukas	Drama	Columbia
The Adventures of Mark Twain	Irving Rapper	Fredric March, Alexis Smith, Donald Crisp	Adventure	Warner Bros.
Alaska	George Archainbaud	Kent Taylor, Margaret Lindsay, John Carradine	Crime adventure	Monogram
Ali Baba and the Forty Thieves	Arthur Lubin	Maria Montez, Jon Hall, Turhan Bey	Adventure	Universal
Allergic to Love	Edward C. Lilley	Martha O'Driscoll, Noah Beery Jr., David Bruce	Musical comedy	Universal
An American Romance	King Vidor	Brian Donlevy, Ann Richards, Walter Abel	Drama	MGM
And the Angels Sing	George Marshall	Fred MacMurray, Betty Hutton, Dorothy Lamour	Musical comedy	Paramount
And Now Tomorrow	Irving Pichel	Alan Ladd, Loretta Young, Susan Hayward	Drama	Paramount; based on Rachel Field book
Andy Hardy's Blonde Trouble	George B. Seitz	Lewis Stone, Mickey Rooney, Fay Holden	Romantic comedy	MGM
Are These Our Parents?	William Nigh	Helen Vinson, Lyle Talbot, Ivan Lebedeff	Romantic drama	Monogram
Arizona Whirlwind	Robert Emmett Tansey	Ken Maynard, Hoot Gibson, Bob Steele	Western	Monogram
Army Wives	Phil Rosen	Elyse Knox, Marjorie Rambeau, Rick Vallin	Romance	Monogram
Arsenic and Old Lace	Frank Capra	Cary Grant, Raymond Massey, Josephine Hull	Comedy	Warner Bros.; based on Joseph Kesselring play
Atlantic City	Ray McCarey	Constance Moore, Jerry Colonna, Charley Grapewin	Musical romance	Republic

== B ==
Title	Director	Cast	Genre	Notes
Babes on Swing Street	Edward C. Lilley	Ann Blyth, Peggy Ryan, Andy Devine	Musical comedy	Universal
Barbary Coast Gent	Roy Del Ruth	Wallace Beery, Binnie Barnes, John Carradine	Western comedy	MGM
Bathing Beauty	George Sidney	Esther Williams, Red Skelton, Basil Rathbone	Musical	MGM
Beautiful but Broke	Charles Barton	Joan Davis, John Hubbard, Jane Frazee	Musical comedy	Columbia
Belle of the Yukon	William A. Seiter	Randolph Scott, Gypsy Rose Lee, Dinah Shore	Western comedy	RKO
Beneath Western Skies	Spencer Gordon Bennet	Robert Livingston, Smiley Burnette, Frank Jaquet	Western	Republic
Bermuda Mystery	Benjamin Stoloff	Preston Foster, Ann Rutherford, Helene Whitney	Mystery	20th Century Fox
Between Two Worlds	Edward A. Blatt	John Garfield, Paul Henreid, Eleanor Parker	Mystery	Warner Bros.
The Big Bonanza	George Archainbaud	Jane Frazee, Richard Arlen, Lynne Roberts	Western	Republic
The Big Noise	Malcolm St. Clair	Laurel and Hardy, Doris Merrick, Veda Ann Borg	Comedy	20th Century Fox
Black Magic	Phil Rosen	Sidney Toler, Mantan Moreland, Jacqueline deWit	Mystery	Monogram
The Black Parachute	Lew Landers	John Carradine, Osa Massen, Larry Parks	War	Columbia
Block Busters	Wallace Fox	Leo Gorcey, Huntz Hall, Gabriel Dell	Comedy	Monogram
Blonde Fever	Richard Whorf	Philip Dorn, Mary Astor, Gloria Grahame	Comedy drama	MGM
Bluebeard	Edgar G. Ulmer	John Carradine, Jean Parker, Nils Asther	Thriller	PRC
Bordertown Trail	Lesley Selander	Smiley Burnette, Sunset Carson, Weldon Heyburn	Western	Republic
Boss of Boomtown	Ray Taylor	Rod Cameron, Tom Tyler, Fuzzy Knight	Western	Universal
Bowery Champs	William Beaudine	Leo Gorcey, Huntz Hall, Gabriel Dell	Crime comedy	Monogram; East Side Kids
Bowery to Broadway	Charles Lamont	Maria Montez, Jack Oakie, Susanna Foster	Comedy	Universal
Brand of the Devil	Harry Fraser	Dave O'Brien, Jim Newill, Guy Wilkerson	Western	PRC
Brazil	Joseph Santley	Tito Guízar, Virginia Bruce, Edward Everett Horton	Musical comedy	Republic; 3 Oscar nominations
Bride by Mistake	Richard Wallace	Alan Marshal, Laraine Day, Marsha Hunt	Comedy	RKO
The Bridge of San Luis Rey	Rowland V. Lee	Lynn Bari, Akim Tamiroff, Francis Lederer	Drama	United Artists; based on Thornton Wilder book
Broadway Rhythm	Roy Del Ruth	George Murphy, Ginny Simms, Nancy Walker, Lena Horne	Musical	MGM
Buffalo Bill	William A. Wellman	Joel McCrea, Maureen O'Hara, Linda Darnell	Western biography	20th Century Fox

== C ==
Title	Director	Cast	Genre	Notes
Call of the Jungle	Phil Rosen	Ann Corio, James Bush, John Davidson	Adventure	Monogram
Call of the Rockies	Lesley Selander	Smiley Burnette, Sunset Carson, Harry Woods	Western	Republic
Call of the South Seas	John English	Janet Martin, Allan Lane, William Henry	Action comedy	Republic
Can't Help Singing	Frank Ryan	Deanna Durbin, Robert Paige, Akim Tamiroff	Musical	Universal
The Canterville Ghost	Jules Dassin	Charles Laughton, Margaret O'Brien, Robert Young	Comedy fantasy	MGM
Career Girl	Wallace Fox	Frances Langford, Edward Norris, Iris Adrian	Musical	PRC
Carolina Blues	Leigh Jason	Kay Kyser, Ann Miller, Victor Moore	Musical	Columbia
Casanova Brown	Sam Wood	Gary Cooper, Teresa Wright, Frank Morgan	Comedy	RKO
Casanova in Burlesque	Leslie Goodwins	Joe E. Brown, June Havoc, Dale Evans	Comedy	Republic
Charlie Chan in the Chinese Cat	Phil Rosen	Sidney Toler, Joan Woodbury, Mantan Moreland	Crime comedy	Monogram; Charlie Chan
Charlie Chan in the Secret Service	Phil Rosen	Sidney Toler, Mantan Moreland, Arthur Loft	Crime comedy	Monogram; Charlie Chan
Cheyenne Wildcat	Lesley Selander	Wild Bill Elliott, Bobby Blake, Alice Fleming	Western	Republic
Chip Off the Old Block	Charles Lamont	Donald O'Connor, Peggy Ryan, Ann Blyth	Musical comedy	Universal
Christmas Holiday	Robert Siodmak	Deanna Durbin, Gene Kelly, Richard Whorf	Film noir	Universal
The Climax	George Waggner	Susanna Foster, Boris Karloff, Turhan Bey	Horror	Universal
Cobra Woman	Robert Siodmak	Maria Montez, Jon Hall, Sabu, Edgar Barrier	Adventure	Universal
Code of the Prairie	Spencer Gordon Bennet	Smiley Burnette, Sunset Carson, Peggy Stewart	Western	Republic
The Conspirators	Jean Negulesco	Hedy Lamarr, Paul Henreid, Sydney Greenstreet	Spy thriller	Warner Bros.
The Contender	Sam Newfield	Buster Crabbe, Arline Judge, Julie Gibson	Western	PRC
Cover Girl	Charles Vidor	Rita Hayworth, Gene Kelly, Phil Silvers	Musical	Columbia
Cowboy and the Senorita	Joseph Kane	Roy Rogers, Mary Lee, Dale Evans	Western	Republic
Cowboy Canteen	Lew Landers	Jane Frazee, Tex Ritter, Barbara Jo Allen	Musical	Columbia
Cowboy from Lonesome River	Benjamin H. Kline	Charles Starrett, Jimmy Wakely, Dub Taylor	Western	Columbia
Crazy Knights	William Beaudine	Billy Gilbert, Shemp Howard, Maxie Rosenbloom	Romantic comedy	Monogram
Crime by Night	William Clemens	Jane Wyman, Jerome Cowan, Eleanor Parker	Crime drama	Warner Bros.
Cry of the Werewolf	Henry Levin	Nina Foch	Horror	Columbia
The Curse of the Cat People	Robert Wise	Simone Simon, Jane Randolph	Horror	RKO
Cyclone Prairie Rangers	Benjamin H. Kline	Charles Starrett, Dub Taylor, Constance Worth	Western	Columbia

== D ==
Title	Director	Cast	Genre	Notes
Dancing in Manhattan	Henry Levin	Fred Brady, Jeff Donnell, William Wright	Musical comedy	Columbia
Dangerous Passage	William Berke	Robert Lowery, Phyllis Brooks, Charles Arnt	Film noir	Paramount
Dark Mountain	William Berke	Robert Lowery, Ellen Drew, Regis Toomey	Crime drama	Paramount
Dark Waters	Andre de Toth	Merle Oberon, Franchot Tone, Thomas Mitchell	Film noir	United Artists
Days of Glory	Jacques Tourneur	Gregory Peck	Romantic drama	RKO
Dead Man's Eyes	Reginald LeBorg	Lon Chaney Jr., Jean Parker	Horror	Universal
Dead or Alive	Elmer Clifton	Tex Ritter, Dave O'Brien, Guy Wilkerson	Western	PRC
Delinquent Daughters	Albert Herman	June Carlson, Fifi D'Orsay, Teala Loring	Crime, Drama	PRC
Destiny	Reginald LeBorg	Gloria Jean, Alan Curtis, Frank Craven	Crime drama	Universal
Detective Kitty O'Day	William Beaudine	Jean Parker, Peter Cookson	Mystery	Monogram
Dixie Jamboree	Christy Cabanne	Frances Langford, Guy Kibbee, Eddie Quillan	Musical	PRC
Double Exposure	William A. Berke	Chester Morris, Nancy Kelly	Crime comedy	Paramount
Double Indemnity	Billy Wilder	Fred MacMurray, Barbara Stanwyck, Edward G. Robinson	Film noir	Paramount. 7 Oscar nominations; remade in 1973
The Doughgirls	James V. Kern	Ann Sheridan, Alexis Smith, Jack Carson	Comedy	Warner Bros.
Dragon Seed	Harold S. Bucquet, Jack Conway	Katharine Hepburn, Walter Huston, Akim Tamiroff, Agnes Moorhead, Henry Travers	Film noir	MGM
The Drifter	Sam Newfield	Buster Crabbe, Al St. John	Western	PRC

== E-F ==
Title	Director	Cast	Genre	Notes
End of the Road	George Blair	Edward Norris, John Abbott, June Storey	Crime drama	Republic
Enemy of Women	Alfred Zeisler	Claudia Drake, Paul Andor, Donald Woods	Drama	Monogram
Enter Arsène Lupin	Ford Beebe	Charles Korvin, Ella Raines	Crime	Universal
The Eve of St. Mark	John M. Stahl	Anne Baxter, Michael O'Shea, Vincent Price	Drama	20th Century Fox; based on the play
Ever Since Venus	Arthur Dreifuss	Ina Ray Hutton, Hugh Herbert, Ann Savage	Musical comedy	Columbia
Experiment Perilous	Jacques Tourneur	Hedy Lamarr, George Brent	Film noir	RKO
Faces in the Fog	John English	Jane Withers, Paul Kelly, Lee Patrick	Drama	Republic
The Falcon in Hollywood	Gordon Douglas	Tom Conway, Rita Corday	Mystery	RKO; Falcon series
The Falcon in Mexico	William Berke	Tom Conway, Mona Maris	Mystery	RKO; Falcon series
The Falcon Out West	William Clemens	Tom Conway, Barbara Hale	Mystery	RKO; Falcon series
A Fig Leaf for Eve	Don Brodie	Jan Wiley, Eddie Dunn, Betty Blythe	Drama	Monogram
The Fighting Seabees	Edward Ludwig	John Wayne, Susan Hayward, William Frawley	War	Republic
The Fighting Sullivans	Lloyd Bacon	Anne Baxter, Thomas Mitchell, Ward Bond	Biography, drama	20th Century Fox
Firebrands of Arizona	Lesley Selander	Smiley Burnette, Sunset Carson, Peggy Stewart	Western	Republic
Follow the Boys	A. Edward Sutherland	George Raft, Vera Zorina, Jeanette MacDonald	War comedy	Universal
Follow the Leader	William Beaudine	Leo Gorcey, Huntz Hall, Gabriel Dell	Adventure	Monogram
Forty Thieves	Lesley Selander	William Boyd, Andy Clyde, Jimmy Rogers	Western	United Artists
Four Jills in a Jeep	William A. Seiter	Kay Francis, Carole Landis, Martha Raye	War musical	20th Century Fox
Frenchman's Creek	Mitchell Leisen	Joan Fontaine, Basil Rathbone, Nigel Bruce	Adventure	Paramount
Frontier Outlaws	Sam Newfield	Buster Crabbe, Marin Sais	Western	PRC
Fuzzy Settles Down	Sam Newfield	Buster Crabbe, Al St. John	Action	PRC

== G-H ==
Title	Director	Cast	Genre	Notes
Gambler's Choice	Frank McDonald	Chester Morris, Nancy Kelly	Crime	Paramount
Gangsters of the Frontier	Elmer Clifton	Tex Ritter, Dave O'Brien, Guy Wilkerson	Western	PRC
Gaslight	George Cukor	Charles Boyer, Ingrid Bergman, Angela Lansbury	Film noir	MGM; Oscar for Bergman
Gentle Annie	Andrew Marton	James Craig, Donna Reed, Marjorie Main	Romantic western	MGM
Ghost Catchers	Edward F. Cline	Olsen and Johnson, Gloria Jean, Martha O'Driscoll	Comedy, horror	Universal
Ghost Guns	Lambert Hillyer	Johnny Mack Brown, Raymond Hatton, Evelyn Finley	Western	Monogram
The Ghost That Walks Alone	Lew Landers	Arthur Lake, Janis Carter, Lynne Roberts	Mystery/comedy	Columbia
Gildersleeve's Ghost	Gordon Douglas	Harold Peary, Marion Martin, Richard LeGrand	Comedy/fantasy	RKO; last in series
Girl in the Case	William Berke	Edmund Lowe, Janis Carter	Mystery	Columbia
Girl Rush	Gordon Douglas	Wally Brown, Alan Carney, Frances Langford	Comedy western	RKO
The Girl Who Dared	Howard Bretherton	Lorna Gray, Peter Cookson, Veda Ann Borg	Mystery	Republic
Goin' to Town	Leslie Goodwins	Chester Lauck, Norris Goff, Barbara Hale	Comedy	RKO
Going My Way	Leo McCarey	Bing Crosby, Barry Fitzgerald, Frank McHugh, Gene Lockhart	Musical comedy	Paramount; won 7 Oscars
Goodnight, Sweetheart	Joseph Santley	Robert Livingston, Ruth Terry, Henry Hull	Musical comedy	Republic
The Great Mike	Wallace Fox	Stuart Erwin, Marion Martin	Comedy	PRC
The Great Moment	Preston Sturges	Joel McCrea, Betty Field	Biopic	Paramount
Greenwich Village	Walter Lang	Carmen Miranda, Don Ameche, William Bendix	Musical	20th Century Fox
Guest in the House	John Brahm	Anne Baxter, Ralph Bellamy, Aline MacMahon	Film noir	United Artists
Guns of the Law	Elmer Clifton	Dave (Tex) O'Brien, Jim Newill, Guy Wilkerson	Western	PRC
Gunsmoke Mesa	Harry Fraser	Dave (Tex) O'Brien, Jim Newill, Guy Wilkerson	Western	PRC
Gypsy Wildcat	Roy William Neill	Maria Montez, Jon Hall, Peter Coe	Adventure	Universal
Hail the Conquering Hero	Preston Sturges	Eddie Bracken, Ella Raines, William Demarest	Comedy	Paramount
The Hairy Ape	Alfred Santell	William Bendix, Susan Hayward, John Loder	Drama	United Artists; based on play by Eugene O'Neill
Hands Across the Border	Joseph Kane	Roy Rogers, Trigger, Ruth Terry	Western	Republic
Harmony Trail	Robert Emmett Tansey	Ken Maynard, Eddie Dean, Gene Alsace	Western	Astor
Hat Check Honey	Edward F. Cline	Leon Errol, Grace McDonald, Walter Catlett	Musical comedy	Universal
The Heavenly Body	Alexander Hall	William Powell, Hedy Lamarr	Comedy	MGM
Heavenly Days	Howard Estabrook	Jim Jordan, Marian Jordan, Barbara Hale	Comedy	RKO; Fibber McGee and Molly
Henry Aldrich, Boy Scout	Hugh Bennett	Jimmy Lydon, Charles Smith, John Litel	Comedy	Paramount
Henry Aldrich Plays Cupid	Hugh Bennett	Jimmy Lydon, Charles Smith, John Litel	Comedy	Paramount
Henry Aldrich's Little Secret	Hugh Bennett	Jimmy Lydon, Charles Smith, John Litel	Comedy	Paramount
Her Primitive Man	Charles Lamont	Louise Allbritton, Robert Paige, Robert Benchley	Comedy	Universal
Here Come the Waves	Mark Sandrich	Bing Crosby, Betty Hutton, Sonny Tufts	Musical comedy	Paramount
Hey, Rookie	Charles Barton	Ann Miller, Joe Besser, Larry Parks	Musical	Columbia
Hi, Beautiful	Leslie Goodwins	Martha O'Driscoll, Noah Beery Jr., Hattie McDaniel	Comedy	Universal
Hi, Good Lookin'!	Edward C. Lilley	Harriet Hilliard, Eddie Quillan, Kirby Grant	Musical comedy	Universal
Hidden Valley Outlaws	Howard Bretherton	Wild Bill Elliott, George "Gabby" Hayes, Anne Jeffreys	Western	Republic
Higher and Higher	Tim Whelan	Michele Morgan, Frank Sinatra	Musical	RKO
The Hitler Gang	John Farrow	Robert Watson, Roman Bohnen, Victor Varconi	Dreama	Paramount
Hollywood Canteen	Delmer Daves	Robert Hutton, Joan Leslie	Musical	Warner Bros.
Home in Indiana	Henry Hathaway	Walter Brennan, Lon McCallister, Jeanne Crain	Drama	20th Century Fox
Hot Rhythm	William Beaudine	Dona Drake, Robert Lowery, Irene Ryan	Musical	Monogram
The Hour Before the Dawn	Frank Tuttle	Veronica Lake, Franchot Tone, Binnie Barnes	Drama	Paramount
House of Frankenstein	Erle C. Kenton	Boris Karloff, Lon Chaney Jr., John Carradine, Glenn Strange	Horror	Universal

== I-J ==
Title	Director	Cast	Genre	Notes
I Accuse My Parents	Sam Newfield	Mary Beth Hughes, Vivienne Osborne	Crime drama	PRC
I Love a Soldier	Mark Sandrich	Paulette Goddard, Sonny Tufts	Drama	Paramount
I'll Be Seeing You	William Dieterle	Ginger Rogers, Shirley Temple	Drama	Selznick
I'm from Arkansas	Lew Landers	Slim Summerville, Iris Adrian	Comedy	PRC
The Impatient Years	Irving Cummings	Jean Arthur, Lee Bowman	Comedy	Columbia
The Impostor	Julien Duvivier	Jean Gabin, Richard Whorf, Ellen Drew	Drama	Universal
In the Meantime, Darling	Otto Preminger	Jeanne Crain, Frank Latimore, Gale Robbins	Drama	20th Century Fox
In Our Time	Vincent Sherman	Ida Lupino, Paul Henreid	Romance	Warner Bros.
In Society	Jean Yarbrough	Abbott and Costello, Marion Hutton	Comedy	Universal
The Invisible Man's Revenge	Ford Beebe	Jon Hall, John Carradine	Science fiction	Universal
Irish Eyes Are Smiling	Gregory Ratoff	Monty Woolley, June Haver	Comedy	20th Century Fox
It Happened Tomorrow	Rene Clair	Dick Powell, Linda Darnell	Fantasy, Comedy	United Artists; 2 Oscar nominations
Jam Session	Charles Barton	Ann Miller, Jess Barker	Musical	Columbia
Jamboree	Joseph Santley	Ruth Terry, Paul Harvey	Comedy	Republic
Janie	Michael Curtiz	Joyce Reynolds, Ann Harding	Comedy	Warner Bros.
Johnny Doesn't Live Here Anymore	Joe May	Simone Simon, James Ellison	Romance	Monogram
Jungle Woman	Reginald LeBorg	Evelyn Ankers, J. Carrol Naish	Horror	Universal

== K-L ==
Title	Director	Cast	Genre	Notes
Kansas City Kitty	Del Lord	Joan Davis, Bob Crosby, Jane Frazee	Musical	Columbia
The Keys of the Kingdom	John M. Stahl	Gregory Peck, Thomas Mitchell, Roddy McDowall	Drama	20th Century Fox
Kismet	William Dieterle	Ronald Colman, Marlene Dietrich, James Craig	Historical	MGM
Knickerbocker Holiday	Harry Joe Brown	Constance Dowling, Nelson Eddy, Charles Coburn	Comedy	United Artists
Ladies Courageous	John Rawlins	Loretta Young, Diana Barrymore, Anne Gwynne, Geraldine Fitzgerald	War	Universal
Ladies of Washington	Louis King	Trudy Marshall, Anthony Quinn, Sheila Ryan	Drama	20th Century Fox
The Lady and the Monster	George Sherman	Vera Ralston, Erich von Stroheim, Richard Arlen	Science fiction	Republic
Lady in the Dark	Kurt Weill	Ginger Rogers, Ray Milland, Jon Hall	Musical	Paramount
Lady in the Death House	Steve Sekely	Jean Parker, Lionel Atwill	Drama	PRC
Lady, Let's Dance	Frank Woodruff	Belita, James Ellison	Musical	Monogram
Lake Placid Serenade	Steve Sekely	Vera Ralston, Eugene Pallette	Drama	Republic
Land of the Outlaws	Lambert Hillyer	Johnny Mack Brown, Raymond Hatton	Western	Monogram
The Laramie Trail	John English	Robert Livingston, Smiley Burnette	Western	Republic
The Last Horseman	William Berke	Russell Hayden, Ann Savage	Western	Columbia
The Last Ride	D. Ross Lederman	Eleanor Parker, Richard Travis	Crime	Warner Bros.
Laura	Otto Preminger	Gene Tierney, Dana Andrews, Clifton Webb, Vincent Price, Judith Anderson	Film noir	20th Century Fox; from Vera Caspary novel; 5 Oscar nominations
Law Men	Lambert Hillyer	Johnny Mack Brown, Jan Wiley	Western	Monogram
Law of the Valley	Howard Bretherton	Johnny Mack Brown, Raymond Hatton, Lynne Carver	Western	Monogram
Leave It to the Irish	William Beaudine	James Dunn, Wanda McKay	Comedy crime	Monogram
Lifeboat	Alfred Hitchcock	Tallulah Bankhead, William Bendix	War, drama	20th Century Fox; Oscar for script
Lights of Old Santa Fe	Frank McDonald	Roy Rogers, Dale Evans	Western	Republic
The Lodger	John Brahm	Merle Oberon, George Sanders, Laird Cregar	Horror	20th Century Fox
Lost in a Harem	Charles Reisner	Abbott and Costello, Marilyn Maxwell	Comedy	MGM
Louisiana Hayride	Charles Barton	Judy Canova, Ross Hunter	Comedy	Columbia
Lumberjack	Lesley Selander	William Boyd, Andy Clyde, Ellen Hall	Western	United Artists

== M-N ==
Title	Director	Cast	Genre	Notes
Machine Gun Mama	Harold Young	Armida	Musical	PRC
Mademoiselle Fifi	Robert Wise	Simone Simon, Kurt Kreuger	Drama	RKO
Maisie Goes to Reno	Harry Beaumont	Ann Sothern, John Hodiak	Comedy	MGM
Make Your Own Bed	Peter Godfrey	Jane Wyman, Jack Carson	Comedy	Warner Bros.
Man from Frisco	Robert Florey	Michael O'Shea, Anne Shirley	Spy film	Republic
Marine Raiders	Harold D. Schuster	Pat O'Brien, Robert Ryan, Ruth Hussey	War	RKO
The Mark of the Whistler	William Castle	Richard Dix, Janis Carter	Mystery	Columbia
Marked Trails	John P. McCarthy	Hoot Gibson, Bob Steele, Veda Ann Borg	Western	Monogram
Marriage Is a Private Affair	Robert Z. Leonard	Lana Turner, John Hodiak	Comedy	MGM
Marshal of Gunsmoke	Vernon Keays	Tex Ritter, Russell Hayden, Jennifer Holt	Western	Universal
Marshal of Reno	Wallace Grissell	Wild Bill Elliott, Alice Fleming	Western	Republic
The Mask of Dimitrios	Jean Negulesco	Sydney Greenstreet, Peter Lorre	Film noir	Warner Bros.; from Eric Ambler novel
The Master Race	Herbert Biberman	George Coulouris	Drama	RKO
Meet Me in St. Louis	Vincente Minnelli	Judy Garland, Margaret O'Brien, Mary Astor	Musical	MGM; 4 Oscar nominations
Meet Miss Bobby Socks	Glenn Tryon	Bob Crosby, Lynn Merrick	Musical	Columbia
Meet the People	Charles Reisner	Lucille Ball, Dick Powell	Musical	MGM
Men on Her Mind	Wallace Fox	Mary Beth Hughes, Edward Norris	Musical	PRC
The Merry Monahans	Charles Lamont	Donald O'Connor, Peggy Ryan, Jack Oakie	Comedy	Universal
Million Dollar Kid	Wallace Fox	Leo Gorcey, Huntz Hall, Louise Currie	Comedy	Monogram
Ministry of Fear	Fritz Lang	Ray Milland, Marjorie Reynolds, Carl Esmond	Film noir	Paramount
Minstrel Man	Joseph H. Lewis	Benny Fields, Gladys George	Musical	PRC; 2 Oscar nominations
The Miracle of Morgan's Creek	Preston Sturges	Eddie Bracken, Betty Hutton, William Demarest	Comedy	Paramount
The Missing Juror	Oscar Boetticher, Jr.	Jim Bannon, Janis Carter	Mystery	Columbia
Mojave Firebrand	Spencer Gordon Bennet	Wild Bill Elliott, George "Gabby" Hayes, Anne Jeffreys	Western	Republic
The Monster Maker	Sam Newfield	J. Carrol Naish, Ralph Morgan, Tala Birell	Science fiction	PRC
Moon Over Las Vegas	Jean Yarbrough	Anne Gwynne, Barbara Jo Allen	Comedy	Universal
Moonlight and Cactus	Edward F. Cline	The Andrews Sisters, Leo Carrillo	Musical	Universal
Mr. Skeffington	Vincent Sherman	Bette Davis, Claude Rains	Drama	Warner Bros.; 2 Oscar nominations
Mr. Winkle Goes to War	Alfred E. Green	Edward G. Robinson, Ruth Warrick	Comedy	Columbia
Mrs. Parkington	Tay Garnett	Greer Garson, Walter Pidgeon, Edward Arnold	Drama	MGM
The Mummy's Curse	Leslie Goodwins	Lon Chaney, Virginia Christine	Horror	Universal
The Mummy's Ghost	Reginald LeBorg	Lon Chaney, John Carradine, Ramsay Ames	Horror	Universal
Murder in the Blue Room	Leslie Goodwins	Anne Gwynne, John Litel	Mystery	Universal
Murder, My Sweet	Edward Dmytryk	Dick Powell, Claire Trevor	Film noir	RKO
Music for Millions	Henry Koster	Jimmy Durante, June Allyson	Musical	MGM
Music in Manhattan	John H. Auer	Anne Shirley, Dennis Day	Musical	RKO
My Best Gal	Anthony Mann	Jane Withers, Jimmy Lydon	Comedy	Republic
My Buddy	Steve Sekely	Ruth Terry, Donald Barry	Drama	Republic
My Gal Loves Music	Edward C. Lilley	Bob Crosby, Grace McDonald	Musical	Universal
My Pal Wolf	Alfred L. Werker	Sharyn Moffett, Jill Esmond, Claire Carleton	Family	RKO
Mystery Man	George Archainbaud	William Boyd, Andy Clyde, Eleanor Stewart	Western	United Artists
Nabonga	Sam Newfield	Buster Crabbe, Julie London	Sci-fi	PRC
The National Barn Dance	Hugh Bennett	Jean Heather, Charles Quigley	Comedy	Paramount
National Velvet	Clarence Brown	Mickey Rooney, Elizabeth Taylor	Drama	MGM; won 2 Oscars
The Navy Way	William Berke	Robert Lowery, Jean Parker, Bill Henry	Drama	Paramount
Nevada	Edward Killy	Bob Mitchum, Anne Jeffreys	Western	RKO
Nine Girls	Leigh Jason	Ann Harding, Evelyn Keyes	Mystery	Columbia
A Night of Adventure	Gordon Douglas	Tom Conway, Audrey Long, John Carradine, Dean Jagger	Crime mystery	RKO
None but the Lonely Heart	Clifford Odets	Cary Grant, Ethel Barrymore	Drama	RKO. Oscar for Barrymore
None Shall Escape	Andre DeToth	Marsha Hunt, Alexander Knox, Henry Travers	War drama	Columbia
Nothing but Trouble	Sam Taylor	Laurel and Hardy	Comedy	MGM

== O-R ==
Title	Director	Cast	Genre	Notes
Oath of Vengeance	Sam Newfield	Buster Crabbe, Al St. John	Western	PRC
Oh, What a Night	William Beaudine	Jean Parker, Edmund Lowe	Crime Drama	Monogram
Oklahoma Raiders	Lewis D. Collins	Tex Ritter, Jennifer Holt	Western	Universal
The Old Texas Trail	Lewis D. Collins	Rod Cameron, Virginia Christine	Western	Universal
Once Upon a Time	Alexander Hall	Cary Grant, Janet Blair	Comedy	Columbia
One Body Too Many	Frank McDonald	Jack Haley, Jean Parker, Bela Lugosi	Horror comedy	Paramount
One Mysterious Night	Oscar Boetticher, Jr.	Chester Morris, Janis Carter	Crime drama	Columbia
Our Hearts Were Young and Gay	Lewis Allen	Gail Russell, Diana Lynn	Comedy	Paramount
Outlaw Roundup	Harry Fraser	Dave (Tex) O'Brien, Jim Newill, Guy Wilkerson	Western	PRC
Outlaw Trail	Robert Emmett Tansey	Hoot Gibson, Bob Steele	Western	Monogram
Outlaws of Santa Fe	Howard Bretherton	Don "Red" Barry, Helen Talbot	Western	Republic
Pardon My Rhythm	Felix E. Feist	Gloria Jean, Patric Knowles, Evelyn Ankers, Marjorie Weaver	Musical	Universal
Partners of the Trail	Lambert Hillyer	Johnny Mack Brown, Raymond Hatton, Christine McIntyre	Western	Monogram
Passage to Marseille	Michael Curtiz	Humphrey Bogart, Claude Rains, Sydney Greenstreet, Peter Lorre	War	Warner Bros.
Passport to Destiny	Ray McCarey	Elsa Lanchester, Gordon Oliver	Drama	RKO
The Pearl of Death	Roy William Neill	Basil Rathbone, Nigel Bruce, Evelyn Ankers	Crime	Universal; Sherlock Holmes
Phantom Lady	Robert Siodmak	Franchot Tone, Ella Raines	Film noir	Universal
Pin Up Girl	William LeBaron	Betty Grable, Martha Raye	Musical	20th Century Fox
The Pinto Bandit	Elmer Clifton	Dave (Tex) O'Brien, Jim Newill, Guy Wilkerson	Western	PRC
The Port of 40 Thieves	John English	Stephanie Bachelor, Tom Keene	Drama	Republic
Practically Yours	Mitchell Leisen	Claudette Colbert, Fred MacMurray	Comedy	Paramount
Pride of the Plains	Wallace Fox	Robert Livingston, Smiley Burnette	Western	Republic
The Princess and the Pirate	David Butler	Bob Hope, Virginia Mayo, Walter Brennan	Comedy	RKO
The Purple Heart	Lewis Milestone	Dana Andrews, Richard Conte, Farley Granger	War	20th Century Fox
The Racket Man	D. Ross Lederman	Hugh Beaumont, Tom Neal, Jeanne Bates	Crime	Columbia
Raiders of the Border	John P. McCarthy	Johnny Mack Brown, Raymond Hatton	Western	Monogram
Rainbow Island	Ralph Murphy	Dorothy Lamour, Eddie Bracken	Comedy	Paramount
Range Law	Lambert Hillyer	Johnny Mack Brown, Raymond Hatton	Western	Monogram
Rationing	Willis Goldbeck	Wallace Beery, Marjorie Main	Comedy	MGM
Reckless Age	Felix E. Feist	Gloria Jean, Henry Stephenson	Drama	Universal
Return of the Ape Man	Phil Rosen	Bela Lugosi, John Carradine, Frank Moran	Horror	Monogram
The Return of the Vampire	Lew Landers	Bela Lugosi, Nina Foch	Horror	Columbia
Riders of the Santa Fe	Wallace Fox	Rod Cameron, Jennifer Holt	Western	Universal
Riding West	William Berke	Charles Starrett, Shirley Patterson	Western	Columbia
Roger Touhy, Gangster	Robert Florey	Preston Foster, Victor McLaglen, Lois Andrews	Crime	20th Century Fox
Rogues' Gallery	Albert Herman	Robin Raymond, Frank Jenks	Drama	PRC
Rosie the Riveter	Joseph Santley	Frank Albertson, Jane Frazee	Musical	Republic

== S ==
Title	Director	Cast	Genre	Notes
Saddle Leather Law	Benjamin H. Kline	Charles Starrett, Dub Taylor	Western	Columbia
Sailor's Holiday	William Berke	Arthur Lake, Shelley Winters	Comedy	Columbia
The San Antonio Kid	Howard Bretherton	Wild Bill Elliott, Bobby Blake, Alice Fleming, Linda Stirling	Western	Republic
San Diego, I Love You	Reginald LeBorg	Jon Hall, Louise Allbritton	Comedy	Universal
San Fernando Valley	John English	Roy Rogers, Dale Evans	Western	Republic
The Scarlet Claw	Roy William Neill	Basil Rathbone, Nigel Bruce, Paul Cavanagh	Crime	Universal; Sherlock Holmes
Secret Command	A. Edward Sutherland	Pat O'Brien, Carole Landis, Chester Morris	Drama	Columbia
Secrets of Scotland Yard	George Blair	Edgar Barrier, Stephanie Bachelor, C. Aubrey Smith	Thriller	Republic
See Here, Private Hargrove	Wesley Ruggles, Tay Garnett	Robert Walker, Donna Reed, Keenan Wynn	Comedy	MGM
Sensations of 1945	Andrew Stone	Eleanor Powell, Dennis O'Keefe, W. C. Fields, Sophie Tucker, Cab Callaway, Woody Herman	Musical comedy	United Artists
Sergeant Mike	Henry Levin	Larry Parks, Jeanne Bates	Drama	Columbia
Seven Days Ashore	John H. Auer	Marcy McGuire, Virginia Mayo	Comedy	RKO
Seven Doors to Death	Elmer Clifton	June Clyde, Chick Chandler	Suspense	PRC
The Seventh Cross	Fred Zinnemann	Spencer Tracy, Hume Cronyn	War drama	MGM
Shadow of Suspicion	William Beaudine	Marjorie Weaver, Peter Cookson	Comedy crime	Monogram
Shadows in the Night	Eugene Forde	Warner Baxter, Nina Foch	Mystery	Columbia; Crime Doctor series
Shake Hands with Murder	Albert Herman	Iris Adrian, Frank Jenks	Mystery	PRC
She's a Soldier Too	William Castle	Beulah Bondi, Nina Foch	Drama	Columbia
She's a Sweetheart	Del Lord	Jane Frazee, Larry Parks	Musical	Columbia
Sheriff of Las Vegas	Lesley Selander	Wild Bill Elliott, Bobby Blake, Peggy Stewart	Western	Republic
Sheriff of Sundown	Lesley Selander	Allan Lane, Duncan Renaldo	Western	Republic
Shine On, Harvest Moon	David Butler	Ann Sheridan, Dennis Morgan, Jack Carson	Musical	Warner Bros.
Show Business	Edwin L. Marin	Eddie Cantor, George Murphy, Joan Davis	Musical	RKO
Silent Partner	George Blair	William Henry, Grant Withers	Thriller	Republic
Silver City Kid	John English	Allan Lane, Peggy Stewart	Western	Republic
Since You Went Away	John Cromwell	Claudette Colbert, Jennifer Jones, Shirley Temple, Joseph Cotten	Romance	United Artists
Sing a Jingle	Edward C. Lilley	Allan Jones, June Vincent	Musical	Universal
Sing Neighbor Sing	Frank McDonald	Roy Acuff and his Smoky Mountain Boys, Rachel, Lulubelle and Scotty, Harry "Pappy" Cheshire	Musical	Republic
The Singing Sheriff	Leslie Goodwins	Bob Crosby, Fay McKenzie	Musical western	Universal
Slightly Terrific	Edward F. Cline	Leon Errol, Anne Rooney	Musical	Universal
Something for the Boys	Lewis Seiler	Carmen Miranda, Phil Silvers, Perry Como	Musical comedy	20th Century Fox
Song of Nevada	Joseph Kane	Roy Rogers, Dale Evans	Western	Republic
Song of the Open Road	S. Sylvan Simon	Jane Powell, Bonita Granville, Edgar Bergen	Musical comedy	United Artists
Song of Russia	Gregory Ratoff	Robert Taylor, Susan Peters	War	MGM
Song of the Range	Wallace Fox	Jimmy Wakely, Dennis Moore	Western	Monogram
Sonora Stagecoach	Robert Emmett Tansey	Bob Steele, Hoot Gibson	Western	Monogram
The Soul of a Monster	Will Jason	Rose Hobart, George Macready	Horror	Columbia
South of Dixie	Jean Yarbrough	Anne Gwynne, Jerome Cowan	Musical	Universal
The Spider Woman	Roy William Neill	Basil Rathbone, Nigel Bruce, Gale Sondergaard	Mystery	Universal Pictures. Sherlock Holmes
Spook Town	Elmer Clifton	Dave O'Brien, Jim Newill, Guy Wilkerson	Western	PRC
Stagecoach to Monterey	Lesley Selander	Allan Lane, Peggy Stewart	Western	Republic
Standing Room Only	Sidney Lanfield	Fred MacMurray, Paulette Goddard	Comedy	Paramount
Stars on Parade	Lew Landers	Larry Parks, Lynn Merrick, Jeff Donnell	Musical	Columbia
Step Lively	Tim Whelan	Frank Sinatra, Gloria DeHaven	Musical	RKO
Storm Over Lisbon	George Sherman	Vera Ralston, Erich von Stroheim	Thriller	Republic
The Story of Dr. Wassell	Cecil B. DeMille	Gary Cooper, Laraine Day, Signe Hasso	War drama	Paramount
Strange Affair	Alfred E. Green	Allyn Joslyn, Evelyn Keyes, Edgar Buchanan	Mystery	Columbia
Strangers in the Night	Anthony Mann	William Terry, Virginia Grey	Thriller	Republic
Summer Storm	Douglas Sirk	Linda Darnell, George Sanders, Anna Lee	Drama	United Artists
Sunday Dinner for a Soldier	Lloyd Bacon	Anne Baxter, John Hodiak	Romance	20th Century Fox
Sundown Valley	Benjamin H. Kline	Charles Starrett, Jeanne Bates	Western	Columbia
The Suspect	Robert Siodmak	Charles Laughton, Ella Raines	Film noir	Universal
Sweet and Low-Down	Archie Mayo	Linda Darnell, Benny Goodman	Musical	20th Century Fox
Sweethearts of the U.S.A.	Lewis D. Collins	Una Merkel, Harry Parke, Teala Loring	Musical	Monogram
Swing Hostess	Sam Newfield	Martha Tilton, Iris Adrian	Musical	PRC
Swing in the Saddle	Lew Landers	Jane Frazee, Guinn Williams, Sally Bliss	Musical	Columbia
Swingtime Johnny	Edward F. Cline	Patty Andrews, Maxene Andrews, Laverne Andrews	Comedy, Musical	Universal

== T ==
Title	Director	Cast	Genre	Notes
Tahiti Nights	Will Jason	Jinx Falkenburg, Dave O'Brien, Mary Treen	Comedy	Columbia
Take It Big	Frank McDonald	Harriet Hilliard, Jack Haley, Ozzie Nelson	Comedy	Paramount
Take It or Leave It	Benjamin Stoloff	Phil Baker, Madge Meredith	Musical	20th Century Fox
Tall in the Saddle	Edwin L. Marin	John Wayne, Ella Raines, Ward Bond	Western	RKO
Tampico	Lothar Mendes	Edward G. Robinson, Lynn Bari, Victor McLaglen	War	20th Century Fox
Texas Masquerade	George Archainbaud	William Boyd, Andy Clyde	Western	United Artists
That's My Baby!	William Berke	Richard Arlen, Ellen Drew	Comedy	Republic
They Live in Fear	Josef Berne	Otto Kruger, Clifford Severn	Drama	Columbia
Thirty Seconds over Tokyo	Mervyn LeRoy	Spencer Tracy, Van Johnson	War drama	MGM
This Is the Life	Felix E. Feist	Donald O'Connor, Susanna Foster	Comedy	Universal
Thoroughbreds	George Blair	Tom Neal, Adele Mara	Drama	Republic
The Thin Man Goes Home	Richard Thorpe	William Powell, Myrna Loy, Gloria DeHaven	Mystery, Comedy	MGM, 5th of series
The Three Caballeros	Norman Ferguson, Clyde Geronimi, Jack Kinney	Aurora Miranda	Animated	Walt Disney, RKO
Three Is a Family	Edward Ludwig	Marjorie Reynolds, Charles Ruggles	Comedy	United Artists
Three Little Sisters	Joseph Santley	Mary Lee, Ruth Terry, Cheryl Walker	Comedy	Republic
3 Men in White	Willis Goldbeck	Lionel Barrymore, Van Johnson, Marilyn Maxwell	Drama	MGM
Three of a Kind	D. Ross Lederman	Billy Gilbert, June Lang	Comedy	Monogram
Thundering Gun Slingers	Sam Newfield	Buster Crabbe, Al St. John	Western	PRC
Till We Meet Again	Frank Borzage	Barbara Britton, Ray Milland	Drama	Paramount
Timber Queen	Frank McDonald	Mary Beth Hughes, Richard Arlen	Drama	Paramount
To Have and Have Not	Howard Hawks	Humphrey Bogart, Lauren Bacall. Walter Brennan, Hoagy Carmichael	Film noir	Warner Bros.; based on novel by Ernest Hemingway
Together Again	Charles Vidor	Irene Dunne, Charles Boyer	Romance	Columbia
Tomorrow, the World!	Leslie Fenton	Fredric March, Betty Field, Agnes Moorehead	Drama	United Artists
The Town Went Wild	Ralph Murphy	Freddie Bartholomew, Jimmy Lydon	Comedy	PRC
Trail to Gunsight	Vernon Keays	Eddie Dew, Lyle Talbot	Western	Universal
Trigger Law	Vernon Keays	Hoot Gibson, Bob Steele	Western	Monogram
Trigger Trail	Lewis D. Collins	Rod Cameron, Vivian Austin	Western	Universal
Trocadero	William Nigh	Rosemary Lane, Johnny Downs, Ralph Morgan	Comedy	Republic
Tucson Raiders	Spencer Gordon Bennet	Wild Bill Elliott, Peggy Stewart	Western	Republic
Twilight on the Prairie	Jean Yarbrough	Johnny Downs, Vivian Austin	Western musical	Universal
Two Girls and a Sailor	Richard Thorpe	Van Johnson, June Allyson	Comedy	MGM
Two-Man Submarine	Lew Landers	Tom Neal, Ann Savage	War	Columbia

== U-Z ==
Title	Director	Cast	Genre	Notes
U-Boat Prisoner	Lew Landers	Bruce Bennett, Erik Rolf	War drama	Columbia
The Uninvited	Lewis Allen	Ray Milland, Ruth Hussey, Donald Crisp	Horror	Paramount
Uncertain Glory	Raoul Walsh	Errol Flynn, Paul Lukas, Faye Emerson	Drama	Warner Bros.
The Unwritten Code	Herman Rotsten	Ann Savage, Tom Neal	War	Columbia
Up in Arms	Elliott Nugent	Danny Kaye, Dinah Shore, Dana Andrews	Comedy	RKO
Up in Mabel's Room	Allan Dwan	Marjorie Reynolds, Dennis O'Keefe, Gail Patrick	Comedy	United Artists
The Utah Kid	Vernon Keays	Hoot Gibson, Bob Steele, Beatrice Gray	Western	Monogram
Valley of Vengeance	Sam Newfield	Buster Crabbe, Evelyn Finley	Western	PRC
The Very Thought of You	Delmer Daves	Dennis Morgan, Eleanor Parker	Drama	Warner Bros.
Vigilantes of Dodge City	Wallace Grissell	Wild Bill Elliott, Linda Stirling	Western	Republic
Voice in the Wind	Arthur Ripley	Francis Lederer, Sigrid Gurie	Drama	United Artists
Voodoo Man	William Beaudine	Bela Lugosi, John Carradine, George Zucco	Horror	Monogram
Waterfront	Steve Sekely	J. Carrol Naish, Maris Wrixon	War, drama	PRC
A Wave, a WAC and a Marine	Phil Karlson	Elyse Knox, Ann Gillis, Sally Eilers	Romantic war comedy	Monogram
Week-End Pass	Jean Yarbrough	Martha O'Driscoll, Noah Beery Jr.	Comedy	Universal
Weird Woman	Reginald LeBorg	Lon Chaney Jr., Anne Gwynne	Horror	Universal; Inner Sanctum series
West of the Rio Grande	Lambert Hillyer	Johnny Mack Brown, Raymond Hatton, Christine McIntyre	Western	Monogram
Westward Bound	Robert Emmett Tansey	Ken Maynard, Hoot Gibson, Bob Steele	Western	Monogram
What a Man!	William Beaudine	Johnny Downs, Wanda McKay	Comedy	Monogram
When Strangers Marry	William Castle	Kim Hunter, Dean Jagger	Film noir	Monogram
When the Lights Go on Again	William K. Howard	Jimmy Lydon, Regis Toomey	Drama	PRC
The Whispering Skull	Elmer Clifton	Tex Ritter, Dave O'Brien, Guy Wilkerson	Western	PRC
The Whistler	William Castle	Richard Dix, Gloria Stuart, Joan Woodbury	Mystery	Columbia
The White Cliffs of Dover	Clarence Brown	Irene Dunne, Alan Marshal	War drama	MGM
Wild Horse Phantom	Sam Newfield	Buster Crabbe, Kermit Maynard	Western	PRC
Wilson	Henry King	Charles Coburn, Alexander Knox, Geraldine Fitzgerald, Thomas Mitchell	Bio-pic	20th Century Fox
Wing and a Prayer	Henry Hathaway	Don Ameche, Dana Andrews, Cedric Hardwicke	War	20th Century Fox; nominated for Best Screenplay
Winged Victory	George Cukor	Lon McCallister, Jeanne Crain, Edmond O'Brien, Judy Holliday	War drama	20th Century Fox
The Woman in the Window	Fritz Lang	Edward G. Robinson, Joan Bennett, Raymond Massey	Film noir	RKO
Wyoming Hurricane	William Berke	Russell Hayden, Dub Taylor	Western	Columbia
The Yellow Rose of Texas	Joseph Kane	Roy Rogers, Dale Evans, Trigger	Western	Republic
You Can't Ration Love	Lester Fuller	Betty Jane Rhodes, Marjorie Weaver, Marie Wilson	Comedy	Paramount
Youth Runs Wild	Mark Robson	Bonita Granville, Kent Smith	Drama	RKO

== Documentaries ==
Title	Director	Cast	Genre	Notes
Adventure in Music	Reginald LeBorg, Ernst Matray	José Iturbi, Emanuel Feuermann, Mildred Dilling	Musical	
The Fighting Lady	Edward Steichen		War Documentary	20th Century Fox
Hymn of the Nations	Alexander Hammid		War documentary	
Memphis Belle: A Story of a Flying Fortress	William Wyler		Documentary	Paramount
Target for Today	William Keighley		Documentary	Eighth Air Force in Poland
Tunisian Victory	Frank Capra, Hugh Stewart, John Huston		War Propaganda	MGM

== Serials ==
Title	Director	Cast	Genre	Notes
Black Arrow	Lew Landers	Mark Roberts, Adele Jergens, Robert Williams	Action western	Columbia Pictures serial
Captain America	Elmer Clifton, John English	Dick Purcell, Lorna Gray	Serial	Republic
The Great Alaskan Mystery	Lewis D. Collins, Ray Taylor	Milburn Stone, Marjorie Weaver, Edgar Kennedy	Spy serial	Universal
Haunted Harbor	Spencer Gordon Bennet	Kane Richmond, Kay Aldridge, Roy Barcroft	Serial	Republic
Mystery of the River Boat	Lewis D. Collins, Ray Taylor	Robert Lowery	Serial	Universal
Raiders of Ghost City	Lewis D. Collins, Ray Taylor	Dennis Moore, Lionel Atwill, Wanda McKay	Western serial	Universal
The Tiger Woman	Spencer Bennet	Allan Lane, Linda Stirling	Adventure serial	Republic
Zorro's Black Whip	Spencer Gordon Bennet	Linda Stirling	Western, serial	Republic

== Shorts ==
Title	Director	Cast	Genre	Notes
The 957th Day			Propaganda short	produced by the US Navy
Attack! Battle of New Britain			Propaganda short	
The Barber of Seville	James Culhane		Animated short	Lantz, Universal
The Battle of China	Frank Capra		War propaganda	
The Bodyguard	Hanna-Barbera	Tom and Jerry	Animated short	MGM
Bugs Bunny and the Three Bears	Chuck Jones	Merrie Melodies	Animated	Warner Bros.
Bugs Bunny Nips the Nips	I. Freleng	Merrie Melodies	Animated, war	Warner Bros.
Busy Buddies	Del Lord	The Three Stooges	Comedy Short	Columbia
Crash Goes the Hash	Jules White	The Three Stooges	Comedy Short	Columbia
Dancing Romeo	Cyril Endfield	Our Gang	Comedy Short	MGM
Five Were Chosen	Herbert Kline	Victor Kilian, Howard Da Silva, Leonid Kinskey	War drama	
Gents Without Cents	Jules White	The Three Stooges	Comedy Short	Columbia
Hare Force	Friz Freleng	Bugs Bunny	Animated short	Warner Bros.
Hell-Bent for Election	Charles M. Jones		Animated, war	
How to Play Golf	Jack Kinney		Animated	Disney, RKO
I Won't Play	Crane Wilbur	Janis Paige, Dane Clark	Short subject	Academy Award winner
Idle Roomers	Del Lord	The Three Stooges	Comedy, short	Columbia
Jammin' the Blues	Gjon Mili	Marie Bryant, Jo Jones, Illinois Jacquet	Short	
Little Red Riding Rabbit	Friz Freleng		Animated, short	Warner Bros.
The Million Dollar Cat	Bill Hanna, Joseph Barbera		Animated short	MGM
Mouse Trouble	Hanna-Barbera	Tom and Jerry	Animated short	MGM
Movie Pests	Will Jason	Pete Smith Specialty with Dave O'Brien, Harry Einstein	Comedy Short	MGM
The Negro Soldier	Stuart Heisler		War Propaganda	
No Dough Boys	Jules White	The Three Stooges	Comedy Short	Columbia
The Old Grey Hare	Robert Clampett		Animated short	MGM
The Price of Rendova			War Propaganda	
Puttin' on the Dog	Hanna-Barbera		Animated short	MGM
Return to Guam			Propaganda short	produced by U.S. Navy
Russian Rhapsody	Robert Clampett	Looney Tunes	Animated short	Warner Bros.
Safety Sleuth	Will Jason	Pete Smith Specialty with Dave O'Brien	Comedy Short	MGM
Sportsman's Memories		Pete Smith Specialty with Dave O'Brien	Comedy Short	MGM
Stage Door Cartoon	Friz Freleng		Animated short	Merrie Melodies
Tick Tock Tuckered	Bob Clampett		Animated short	Warner Bros.
What Makes a Battle			Propaganda short	taking of Marshall Islands
What's Cookin' Doc?	Bob Clampett	Bugs Bunny	Animated short	Warner Bros.
With the Marines at Tarawa	Louis Hayward		War propaganda	Battle of Tarawa
The Yoke's on Me	Jules White	The Three Stooges	Comedy, short	Columbia
The Zoot Cat	Hanna-Barbera	Tom and Jerry	Animated short	MGM

== See also ==
- 1944 in the United States
