= John Hamilton (actor) =

American actor (1887–1958)

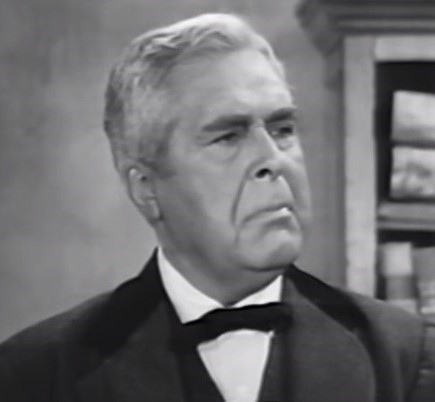
- Hamilton in The Adventures of Kit Carson (1951)
- Born: John Rummel Hamilton; January 16, 1887; Shippensburg, Pennsylvania, U.S.
- Died: October 15, 1958 (aged 71); Hollywood, California, U.S.
- Resting place: Hollywood Forever Cemetery
- Occupation: Actor
- Years active: 1908–1958
- Known for: Fictional character Perry White in Adventures of Superman (1952–1958)
- Spouse(s): Elizabeth J. Greenhow (m. 7 March 1939; div. 19??)
- Children: 1

John Rummel Hamilton (January 16, 1887 – October 15, 1958) was an American actor who appeared in many movies and television programs, including the role as the blustery newspaper editor Perry White in the 1950s television program Adventures of Superman.

== Biography ==
John R. Hamilton was born in Shippensburg, Pennsylvania, to John M. Hamilton and his wife Cornelia J. (Hollar) Hamilton. Hamilton was the youngest of four children, and his mother died eight days after his birth. Hamilton grew up in neighboring Southampton Township, Pennsylvania, where his father worked as a store clerk.

Hamilton's father was also appointed Shippensburg's trustee for the State Superintendent of Public Education, allowing Hamilton to attend college at Dickinson College and Shippensburg State Teacher's College. He opted to forgo teaching for a stage career, however.

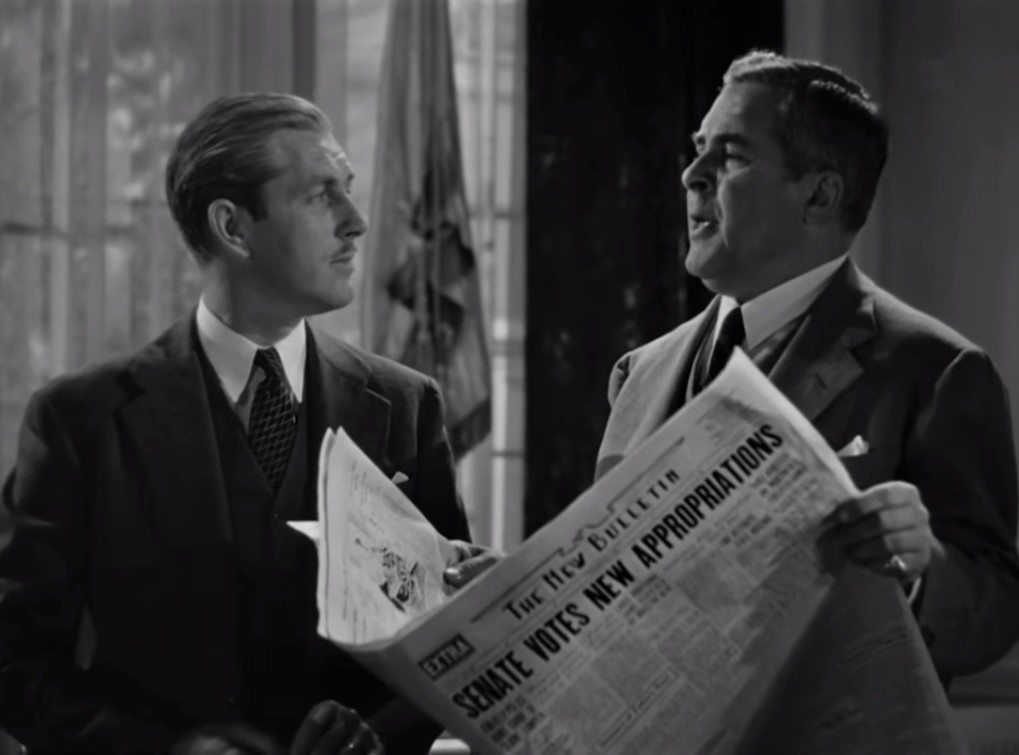
John Hamilton (right) in Meet John Doe (1941)

After becoming an actor, he worked in Broadway plays and in touring theatrical companies for many years prior to his 1930 movie debut. He was featured with Donald Meek in a series of short mysteries based on S.S. Van Dine stories for Warner Brothers. He played various types of characters, but most often figures of authority like judges and lawyers, politicians and commissioners, doctors and military officers. He appeared in more than three hundred movies, movie serials or television programs from the 1930s through the 1950s.

Among other roles, Hamilton appeared as a judge who passes sentence on soon-to-be-racketeer James Cagney for violation of the Volstead Act in The Roaring Twenties (1939). Hamilton also appeared as a police inspector in the John Huston film In This Our Life in 1942, and got several lines as DA Bryan quizzing Humphrey Bogart's Sam Spade in The Maltese Falcon (1941). He also played Professor Gordon in Flash Gordon Conquers the Universe (1940) and eventually the Daily Planet newspaper editor Perry White in the 1950s television series Adventures of Superman (1952–1958). After that, he appeared in television commercials for a brand of bifocals termed "Inviso No-Line Glasses."

== Death ==
John Hamilton died on October 15, 1958, in Glendale, California, of heart failure at the age of 71. He was survived by a son. He was interred in Hollywood Forever Cemetery.

== Selected filmography ==
- Dangerous Nan McGrew (1930) - Grant
- Heads Up (1930) - Capt. Whitney
- Success (1931) - The Father
- Rare Auto and Travel Thrills (1933)
- Keep 'Em Rolling (1934) - Major in France Battlefield (uncredited)
- Stand Up and Cheer! (1934) - Presidential Naval Aide (uncredited)
- Parole! (1936) - Police Inspector Hamilton (uncredited)
- The Final Hour (1936) - Department of Justice Chief (uncredited)
- Two-Fisted Gentleman (1936) - Frank Boyd
- Craig's Wife (1936) - Detective (uncredited)
- Two in a Crowd (1936) - Purdy
- Adventure in Manhattan (1936) - Chief of G-Men (uncredited)
- Legion of Terror (1936) - Cummings
- Love Letters of a Star (1936) - (uncredited)
- Three Smart Girls (1936) - Police Lieutenant (uncredited)
- Lady from Nowhere (1936) - Commissioner
- A Man Betrayed (1936) - Mr. Carlton
- Breezing Home (1937) - Chairman (uncredited)
- Two Wise Maids (1937) - Grover Wentworth
- Her Husband Lies (1937) - First Plainclothesman (uncredited)
- Seventh Heaven (1937) - Gendarme
- I Promise to Pay (1937) - Martin (uncredited)
- Criminals of the Air (1937) - Captain Wallace
- This Is My Affair (1937) - Warden
- Fifty Roads to Town (1937) - Captain Carroll
- Married Before Breakfast (1937) - Plainclothesman at Pier (uncredited)
- It Could Happen to You (1937) - Judge
- She Had to Eat (1937) - Police Captain (uncredited)
- The Singing Marine (1937) - Marine Colonel in Shanghai (uncredited)
- Bad Guy (1937) - Warden
- On Such a Night (1937) - Army Officer (uncredited)
- The Man Who Cried Wolf (1937) - A Judge (uncredited)
- That Certain Woman (1937) - American (scenes deleted)
- One Hundred Men and a Girl (1937) - Theatre Manager (uncredited)
- Dangerously Yours (1937) - Roberts (uncredited)
- Night Club Scandal (1937) - Governor
- Missing Witnesses (1937) - Police Chief Elmer H. Davis (uncredited)
- Murder Is News (1937) - David Corning
- Mr. Moto's Gamble (1938) - Philip Benton
- Over the Wall (1938) - Warden
- Doctor Rhythm (1938) - Insp. Bryce
- Hunted Men (1938) - Commissioner Police (uncredited)
- You Can't Take It with You (1938) - Kirby's Dining Guest (uncredited)
- Boys Town (1938) - Warden (uncredited)
- Personal Secretary (1938) - Truesdale (uncredited)
- Too Hot to Handle (1938) - Mr. Fairfield (uncredited)
- Mr. Wong, Detective (1938) - Simon Dayton
- Girls on Probation (1938) - Police Chief (uncredited)
- I Stand Accused (1938) - Defense Attorney Brower
- Angels with Dirty Faces (1938) - Police Captain (uncredited)
- Devil's Island (1939) - Captain of Second Convict Ship (uncredited)
- My Son Is a Criminal (1939) - Policeman (uncredited)
- Secret Service of the Air (1939) - Warden Jackson (uncredited)
- The Spirit of Culver (1939) - Maj. White
- Inside Story (1939) - Judge (uncredited)
- Three Smart Girls Grow Up (1939) - Harry - Conference Room Businessman (uncredited)
- First Offenders (1939) - Sheriff Slavin
- Blind Alley (1939) - Warden (uncredited)
- Forged Passport (1939) - Jack Rogers
- Confessions of a Nazi Spy (1939) - FBI Chief (uncredited)
- Rose of Washington Square (1939) - Judge
- It Could Happen to You (1939) - Minor Role (uncredited)
- Stronger Than Desire (1939) - Second Trial Judge (uncredited)
- The Forgotten Woman (1939) - Dr. May
- Waterfront (1939) - Detective Captain (uncredited)
- They Shall Have Music (1939) - Detective (uncredited)
- I Stole a Million (1939) - Dist. Atty. Wilson
- The Angels Wash Their Faces (1939) - Officer Merton (uncredited)
- Full Confession (1939) - The Judge (uncredited)
- Dust Be My Destiny (1939) - First Warden (uncredited)
- Espionage Agent (1939) - Code Room Instructor (uncredited)
- Smashing the Money Ring (1939) - Night Captain
- On Dress Parade (1939) - A Co. Maneuvers Colonel (uncredited)
- The Roaring Twenties (1939) - Judge
- Call a Messenger (1939) - Police Lt. Nelson (uncredited)
- Swanee River (1939) - Doctor (uncredited)
- Invisible Stripes (1939) - Captain Johnson (uncredited)
- Oh Johnny, How You Can Love (1940) - Jonathan Archer (uncredited)
- Brother Rat and a Baby (1940) - Judge (uncredited)
- Dr. Ehrlich's Magic Bullet (1940) - Hirsch (uncredited)
- Three Cheers for the Irish (1940) - Eddie - the Judge (uncredited)
- Johnny Apollo (1940) - Judge
- Flash Gordon Conquers the Universe (1940, Serial) - Professor Gordon [Chs. 1, 4]
- Tear Gas Squad (1940) - Chief Ferris
- Murder in the Air (1940) - Agent Hargrave (uncredited)
- The Man Who Talked Too Much (1940) - Governor (uncredited)
- They Drive by Night (1940) - Defense Attorney (uncredited)
- The Golden Fleecing (1940) - Judge (uncredited)
- Boom Town (1940) - McMasters' Defense Attorney (uncredited)
- Fugitive from a Prison Camp (1940) - Minor Role (uncredited)
- Tugboat Annie Sails Again (1940) - Capt. Broad
- Lady with Red Hair (1940) - Defense Attorney Graham (uncredited)
- The Great Plane Robbery (1940) - Dr. Jamison
- Flight Command (1940) - Pensacola Commander (uncredited)
- Cheers for Miss Bishop (1941) - President Watts
- Flight from Destiny (1941) - Judge (uncredited)
- Meet John Doe (1941) - Jim (uncredited)
- Strange Alibi (1941) - Judge in Geary Trial (uncredited)
- World Premiere (1941) - Bronson (uncredited)
- Hold Back the Dawn (1941) - Mac - Studio Receptionist (uncredited)
- Nine Lives Are Not Enough (1941) - Police Chief Turner (uncredited)
- It Started with Eve (1941) - Thomas - Headwaiter (uncredited)
- Passage from Hong Kong (1941) - Capt. Shouse (uncredited)
- The Maltese Falcon (1941) - District Attorney Bryan
- Blues in the Night (1941) - Doctor Treating Jigger (uncredited)
- They Died with Their Boots On (1941) - Colonel (uncredited)
- I Killed That Man (1941) - District Attorney
- Borrowed Hero (1941) - William Brooks
- The Body Disappears (1941) - Trial Judge (uncredited)
- Pacific Blackout (1941) - Police Captain (uncredited)
- Always in My Heart (1942) - Warden
- To the Shores of Tripoli (1942) - Gen. Gordon (scenes deleted)
- I Was Framed (1942) - Judge (uncredited)
- The Great Man's Lady (1942) - Sen. Grant
- In This Our Life (1942) - Police Inspector Millett
- Dr. Broadway (1942) - Joe - Inspector (uncredited)
- Syncopation (1942) - Mr. Ames (uncredited)
- Yankee Doodle Dandy (1942) - Recruiting Major (uncredited)
- The Big Shot (1942) - Judge
- Wings for the Eagle (1942) - Mr. Archer (uncredited)
- Escape from Crime (1942) - Rafferty
- Enemy Agents Meet Ellery Queen (1942) - Bracken - The Police Commissioner
- Across the Pacific (1942) - Court-Martial President
- Phantom Killer (1942) - John G. Harrison
- Lucky Jordan (1942) - Colonel (scenes deleted)
- Over My Dead Body (1942) - District Attorney Stuart Drinkwater
- Tennessee Johnson (1942) - State Chairman (uncredited)
- G-Men vs. the Black Dragon (1943, Serial) - Raymond Martin (uncredited)
- Aerial Gunner (1943) - Doctor (uncredited)
- Mission to Moscow (1943) - Charlie - American Newsman (uncredited)
- Daredevils of the West (1943, Serial) - Sen. Garfield [Ch. 8]
- Good Luck, Mr. Yates (1943) - J.C. Allison (uncredited)
- Gals, Incorporated (1943) - Doctor (uncredited)
- The Adventures of a Rookie (1943) - Col. Wilson (uncredited)
- So's Your Uncle (1943) - Mr. Craig
- Larceny with Music (1943) - Important banker
- Crazy House (1943) - Outraged Director (uncredited)
- Government Girl (1943) - Irate Man (uncredited)
- Swingtime Johnny (1943) - Caldwell
- What a Woman! (1943) - Senator (uncredited)
- Rookies in Burma (1943) - Army Major (uncredited)
- Standing Room Only (1944) - General (uncredited)
- Captain America (1944, Serial) - G.F. Hillman [Chs. 13-14]
- Up in Arms (1944) - Businessman in Theatre Lobby (uncredited)
- Action in Arabia (1944) - Mr. Hamilton (uncredited)
- Hi, Good Lookin'! (1944) - Mr. McGillicuddy (uncredited)
- Man from Frisco (1944) - Governor (uncredited)
- Goodnight, Sweetheart (1944) - District Attorney (uncredited)
- Christmas Holiday (1944) - Jury Foreman (uncredited)
- Allergic to Love (1944) - Dr. McLaughlan
- Wilson (1944) - Legislator in Wilson's Office (uncredited)
- The Girl Who Dared (1944) - Beau Richmond
- The Port of 40 Thieves (1944) - Mr. Fellows
- Maisie Goes to Reno (1944) -Judge Carter (uncredited)
- The Doughgirls (1944) - Businessman in Lobby (uncredited)
- Shadow of Suspicion (1944) - Mr. R.M. Cartell
- Music in Manhattan (1944) - Mr. Bradley, the Banker (uncredited)
- I'm from Arkansas (1944) - Harry Cashin - Vice President of Slowe Packing Company
- Zorro's Black Whip (1944, Serial) - Mr. Walsh - Banker [Chs.1-3,10-12]
- My Gal Loves Music (1944) - Doctor (uncredited)
- Army Wives (1944) - Gen. Lowry (uncredited)
- Crazy Knights (1944) - Mr. Gardner
- Hi, Beautiful (1944) - Board Member (uncredited)
- Meet Miss Bobby Socks (1944) - R. N. Swanson (uncredited)
- Lake Placid Serenade (1944) - Hopkins (uncredited)
- Sheriff of Las Vegas (1944) - Judge Homer T. Blackwell
- Mom and Dad (1945) - Dr. Burnell
- The Great Flamarion (1945) - Coroner (uncredited)
- Strange Illusion (1945) - Bill Allen
- Circumstantial Evidence (1945) - Gov. Hanlon
- I'll Tell the World (1945) - President (uncredited)
- The Naughty Nineties (1945) - Sheriff of Ironville (uncredited)
- On Stage Everybody (1945) - Mr. Smoothasilk (uncredited)
- Incendiary Blonde (1945) - Judge (uncredited)
- First Yank Into Tokyo (1945) - Dr. Stacey (uncredited)
- Sensation Hunters (1945) - Night Court Judge (uncredited)
- Johnny Angel (1945) - Harbor Master (uncredited)
- Voice of the Whistler (1945) - Doctor (uncredited)
- Northwest Trail (1945) - John Owens
- Girl on the Spot (1946) - Police Commissioner (uncredited)
- Because of Him (1946) - Critic (uncredited)
- The Phantom Rider (1946, Serial) - Sen. Williams [Chs. 7-8]
- The Madonna's Secret (1946) - Lambert
- Blondie's Lucky Day (1946) - Mr. Emory (uncredited)
- Johnny Comes Flying Home (1946) - C.H. Metters (uncredited)
- Home on the Range (1946) - State Official
- Badman's Territory (1946) - Commissioner Taylor (uncredited)
- One Exciting Week (1946) - Dr. Jones (uncredited)
- Renegades (1946) - Prosecuting Attorney (uncredited)
- Shadows Over Chinatown (1946) - Pronnet (uncredited)
- The Mysterious Mr. M (1946, Serial) - Dr. Kittridge (uncredited)
- Step by Step (1946) - Police Capt. Edmonds (uncredited)
- The Brute Man (1946) - Professor Cushman (uncredited)
- Wife Wanted (1946) - Judge (uncredited)
- The Secret of the Whistler (1946) - McLaren aka Mac (uncredited)
- Magnificent Doll (1946) - Mr. Witherspoon (uncredited)
- Raiders of the South (1947) - General Lawton
- I'll Be Yours (1947) - Board Chairman (uncredited)
- The Devil on Wheels (1947) - Mr. Davis (uncredited)
- The Beginning or the End (1947) - Dr. Harold C. Urey
- The Sea of Grass (1947) - Forrest Hamilton (uncredited)
- It Happened on Fifth Avenue (1947) - Harper (uncredited)
- Violence (1947) - Doctor Chalmers
- New Orleans (1947) - Police Chief (uncredited)
- That's My Gal (1947) - Assemblyman McBride
- Too Many Winners (1947) - Albert Payson
- The Trouble with Women (1947) - 2nd Judge
- The Secret Life of Walter Mitty (1947) - Dr. Remington (uncredited)
- News Hounds (1947) - Timothy X. 'Big Tim' Donlin
- The Unfinished Dance (1947) - Dr. Philburn (uncredited)
- The Foxes of Harrow (1947) - Ship's Cargo Official (uncredited)
- Key Witness (1947) - R. C. Hurlbert - Coroner (uncredited)
- Blondie in the Dough (1947) - Premier Biscuit Board Member (uncredited)
- The Fabulous Texan (1947) - President Ulysses S. Grant (uncredited)
- Bandits of Dark Canyon (1947) - Ben Shaw
- High Wall (1947) - Police Surgeon (uncredited)
- Song of My Heart (1948) - Czar
- The Judge Steps Out (1948) - Diner on Train (uncredited)
- The Gallant Legion (1948) - Speaker of the House (uncredited)
- The Checkered Coat (1948) - Marcus Anson
- Return of the Bad Men (1948) - Doc Greene (uncredited)
- The Babe Ruth Story (1948) - Businessman (uncredited)
- Walk a Crooked Mile (1948) - G.W. Hunter (uncredited)
- The Gentleman from Nowhere (1948) - Judge (uncredited)
- Desperadoes of Dodge City (1948) - Land Agent
- In This Corner (1948) - Admiral in Harris' Office
- Rusty Leads the Way (1948) - Board Member (uncredited)
- Sheriff of Wichita (1949) - Prison Warden
- The Judge (1949) - Lt. Edwards
- The Undercover Man (1949)
- Addio Mimí! (1949) - Doctor
- Canadian Pacific (1949) - Pere Lacomb
- Law of the Golden West (1949) - Isaac Cody, Bill's father
- The Wyoming Bandit (1949) - Marshal
- Bandit King of Texas (1949) - Marshal John Turner
- The James Brothers of Missouri (1949, Serial) - Lon Royer [Ch.1]
- Strange Bargain (1949) - Employee at Meeting (uncredited)
- Fighting Man of the Plains (1949) - Currier
- Alias the Champ (1949) - Police Commissioner Bronson
- Prison Warden (1949) - Mr. Webb (uncredited)
- Pioneer Marshal (1949) - Man with Bracelet
- Bodyhold (1949) - Commissioner Harley
- Davy Crockett, Indian Scout (1950) - Col. Pollard
- Bells of Coronado (1950) - Mr. Linden, Insurance Company Official
- Military Academy with That Tenth Avenue Gang (1950) - Judge Ralph Townsend
- The Reformer and the Redhead (1950) - Police Captain (uncredited)
- The Invisible Monster (1950, Serial) - Henry Miller [Chs. 1, 8, 12] (uncredited)
- Annie Get Your Gun (1950) - Ship Captain (uncredited)
- Duchess of Idaho (1950) - Board Member (uncredited)
- The Men (1950) - Justice of the Peace (uncredited)
- Bunco Squad (1950) - John Deming (uncredited)
- I'll Get By (1950) - Marine General (uncredited)
- Right Cross (1950) - Horse Owner (unconfirmed)
- The Missourians (1950) - Mayor Grant McDowall
- The Du Pont Story (1950) - Military Officer (uncredited)
- The Magnificent Yankee (1950) - Justice White (uncredited)
- The Flying Missile (1950) - Second Senator (uncredited)
- Al Jennings of Oklahoma (1951) - Schyler (uncredited)
- Belle Le Grand (1951) - Broker (uncredited)
- Sugarfoot (1951) - Judge Backus (uncredited)
- Night Riders of Montana (1951) - Doctor (uncredited)
- Inside Straight (1951) - Jim Walters (uncredited)
- Badman's Gold (1951) - The Marshal
- The Great Caruso (1951) - Forrest DeWitt - Charity High Bidder (uncredited)
- Million Dollar Pursuit (1951) - Police Inspector Morgan
- The Guy Who Came Back (1951) - Admiral (uncredited)
- Criminal Lawyer (1951) - Police Captain Loomis (uncredited)
- The Pace That Thrills (1952) - Sour Puss
- Target (1952) - Bailey
- Listen, Judge (1952) - Three Stooges short
- Cripple Creek (1952) - San Francisco Postmaster (uncredited)
- The Rose Bowl Story (1952) - Dr. Lansing (uncredited)
- Million Dollar Mermaid (1952) - Skeptic in Rector's Restaurant (uncredited)
- Never Wave at a WAC (1953) - Sen. Holbrook (uncredited)
- Marshal of Cedar Rock (1953) - Stover - Prison Warden
- Jack McCall, Desperado (1953) - Col. Cornish
- Iron Mountain Trail (1953) - Circuit Judge
- Run for the Hills (1953) - Mr. Harvester
- So This Is Love (1953) - Charlie, Show Backer (uncredited)
- El Paso Stampede (1953) - Rancher White (uncredited)
- Donovan's Brain (1953) - Mr. MacNish, Bank Manager (uncredited)
- Man of Conflict (1953) - Cornwall
- Sitting Bull (1954) - Clifton Staley (uncredited)
- Stamp Day for Superman (1954) - Perry White
- The Night of the Hunter (1955) - Townsman Who Greets Rachel (uncredited)
- Bobby Ware Is Missing (1955) - Stearns - Goodwin's Associate (uncredited)
- Chicago Confidential (1957) - Attorney Emory Morgan (uncredited)
- Outcasts of the City (1958)
- Adventures of Superman (1952–1958, TV Series) - Perry White (final appearance)
