= Chester Clute =

American actor (1891–1956)

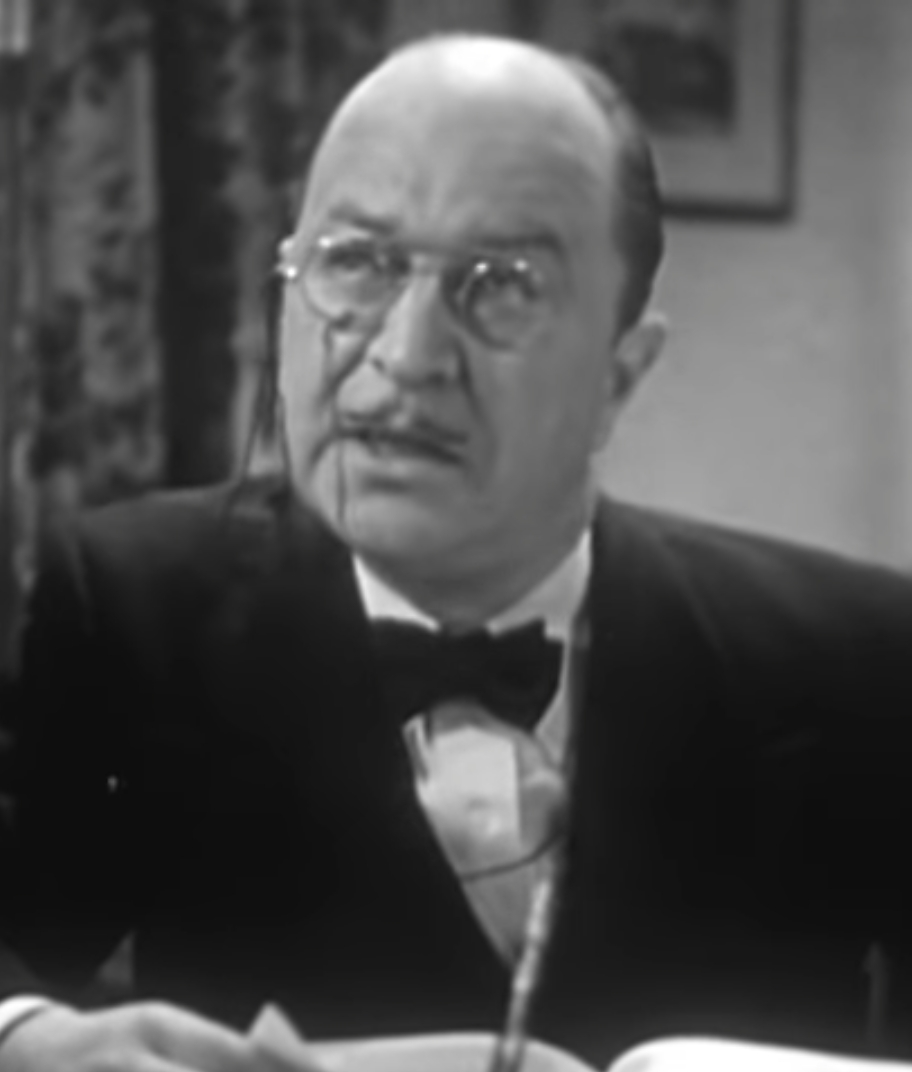
- Clute in Navy Blues (1937)
- Born: Chester Lamont Clute; February 18, 1891; Orange, New Jersey, U.S.
- Died: April 2, 1956 (aged 65); Woodland Hills, California, U.S.
- Resting place: Valhalla Memorial Park Cemetery
- Occupation: Actor
- Years active: 1930–1953

Chester Lamont Clute (February 18, 1891 – April 2, 1956) was an American character actor familiar in scores of Hollywood films from his debut in 1930. Diminutive, bald-pated with a bristling moustache, he appeared in mostly unbilled roles, consisting usually of one or two lines, in nearly 250 films.

== Early years ==
Chester Clute was born in Orange, New Jersey. His father played in the orchestra for a minstrel show, and Clute initially encountered show business when his father took him "at a very tender age" on a tour with the show. That experience kindled Clute's life-long interest in entertaining. He was the leading man in his high school's dramatic society, and he worked with amateur theatrical productions after he graduated.

== Career ==
After Clute finished high school he worked first with a construction company and then with an architectural firm. He left that job to join the Edward Forsberg Players stock company, which was in Newark, New Jersey, at the Orpheum Theater. He went from there to a three-year vaudeville stint in The Coward act. Then he returned to the theater as the leading man in a touring production of The Very Idea. In 1930 Warner Bros.-Vitaphone recorded Clute's Thank You Doctor vaudeville skit for use as a short feature sound film. After that he made the short comedy feature The Jaywalker.

Clute's Broadway credits included Ceiling Zero (1935), Page Miss Glory (1934), Triplets (1932), Oh, Promise Me (1930), The New Yorkers (1927), and She Couldn't Say No (1926).

Clute's experience included acting in Australia. A newspaper's review of his performance in Irene in Perth said, "His work is sound, and without effort he gets every ounce of humour out of the part. His portrayal of Madame Lucy is an outstanding feature of this bright musical frivol."

== Death ==
Clute died of a heart attack in Woodland Hills, California, aged 65. He is buried at Valhalla Memorial Park Cemetery.

== Selected filmography ==
- The Dentist (1932)
- Crash Donovan (1936) - Mr. Horner (uncredited)
- Navy Blues (1937) - Uncle Andrew
- There Goes My Girl (1937) - Stu Parker - Whelan's Idea Man
- Dance, Charlie, Dance (1937) - Alvin Gussett
- Exclusive (1937) - Garner
- She Asked for It (1937) - Photographer (uncredited)
- The Wrong Road (1937) - Dan O'Fearna
- The Great Garrick (1937) - M. Moreau
- Live, Love and Learn (1937) - Fake Art Critic Henderson (uncredited)
- Living on Love (1937) - Jessup
- Thoroughbreds Don't Cry (1937) - Man with Toupee (uncredited)
- 45 Fathers (1937) - Timid Juror (uncredited)
- Big Town Girl (1937) - Assistant Hotel Manager (uncredited)
- True Confession (1937) - Juror (uncredited)
- Change of Heart (1938) - Tom Jones (uncredited)
- Love Is a Headache (1938) - Pants Salesman (uncredited)
- The Jury's Secret (1938) - Secretary (uncredited)
- Arsène Lupin Returns (1938) - Reporter (uncredited)
- Reckless Living (1938) - Sucker (uncredited)
- He Couldn't Say No (1938) - Musgrave
- Mr. Moto's Gamble (1938) - Ticket Theft Victim (uncredited)
- Go Chase Yourself (1938) - Pushy Little Man in Bank (uncredited)
- Rascals (1938) - Mr. Roger Adams
- Letter of Introduction (1938) - Guest at Cocktail Party (uncredited)
- Mr. Chump (1938) - Ed Mason
- Keep Smiling (1938) - Auctioneer (uncredited)
- Sing You Sinners (1938) - Race Tout at Lunch Counter (uncredited)
- You Can't Take It with You (1938) - Hammond (uncredited)
- Personal Secretary (1938) - Levering (uncredited)
- Youth Takes a Fling (1938) - Salesman
- Touchdown, Army (1938) - Mr. Rawlings (uncredited)
- Service de Luxe (1938) - Chester Bainbridge
- Hard to Get (1938) - Mr. Pinkey (uncredited)
- Annabel Takes a Tour (1938) - Pitcarin, Rodney-Marlborough Hotel Manager
- Comet Over Broadway (1938) - Willis
- Artists and Models Abroad (1938) - Simpson
- Pardon Our Nerve (1939) - Mr. Flemingwell
- I Was a Convict (1939) - Evans
- Dodge City (1939) - Coggins (uncredited)
- East Side of Heaven (1939) - Phil (uncredited)
- Bachelor Mother (1939) - Oliver - Man in Park (uncredited)
- The Spellbinder (1939) - Dr. Hillary Schunk (uncredited)
- Miracles for Sale (1939) - Waiter with Sugar (uncredited)
- Dust Be My Destiny (1939) - Movie Theatre Manager (uncredited)
- Dancing Co-Ed (1939) - Braddock
- Television Spy (1939) - Harry Payne
- Too Busy to Work (1939) - Springer
- Laugh It Off (1939) - Eliot Rigby
- The Honeymoon's Over (1939) - Higginsby (uncredited)
- Thou Shalt Not Kill (1939) - Waiter (uncredited)
- Invisible Stripes (1939)
- Remember the Night (1940) - Jewelry Salesman (uncredited)
- The Man Who Wouldn't Talk (1940) - Pompous Man (uncredited)
- Blondie on a Budget (1940) - Ticket Agent (uncredited)
- The Doctor Takes a Wife (1940) - Johnson
- My Favorite Wife (1940) - Shoe Salesman (uncredited)
- Turnabout (1940) - Briggs (uncredited)
- Millionaires in Prison (1940) - Sidney Keats
- Wildcat Bus (1940) - Man Reading Repossession Notice (uncredited)
- Dance, Girl, Dance (1940) - Bailey #2
- Hired Wife (1940) - Martin Peabody - Justice of the Peace (uncredited)
- Public Deb No. 1 (1940) - Car Payment Man (uncredited)
- Too Many Girls (1940) - Lister
- A Little Bit of Heaven (1940) - Mr. Dixon
- Who Killed Aunt Maggie? (1940) - Justice of the Peace (uncredited)
- She Couldn't Say No (1940) - Ezra Pine
- Love Thy Neighbor (1940) - Judge
- This Thing Called Love (1940) - Bit Part (uncredited)
- Tall, Dark and Handsome (1941) - Floorwalker (uncredited)
- Footlight Fever (1941) - Mr. Holly - Parker's Secretary (uncredited)
- They Met in Argentina (1941) - B.A. Jackson, Hastings' Secretary (uncredited)
- She Knew All the Answers (1941) - Butter and Egg Man
- Hurry, Charlie, Hurry (1941) - Cardwell, Daniel's Secretary (uncredited)
- Manpower (1941) - Drug Store Clerk (uncredited)
- Sun Valley Serenade (1941) - Process Server
- Scattergood Meets Broadway (1941) - Quentin Van Deusen
- Unfinished Business (1941) - Mr. Beck (uncredited)
- The Smiling Ghost (1941) - Homely Woman's Husband (uncredited)
- Hold Back the Dawn (1941) - Man in Climax Bar (uncredited)
- Niagara Falls (1941) - Potter
- Three Girls About Town (1941) - Frank - Magician (uncredited)
- New York Town (1941) - Mr. Cobbler (uncredited)
- Look Who's Laughing (1941) - Mr. Blaize (scenes deleted)
- The Perfect Snob (1941) - Nibsie Nicholson
- Bedtime Story (1941) - Second Desk Clerk (uncredited)
- All Through the Night (1942) - Westmore Hotel Clerk (uncredited)
- The Fleet's In (1942) - Justice of the Peace (uncredited)
- A Tragedy at Midnight (1942) - Pierre (uncredited)
- Valley of the Sun (1942) - Wilbur (uncredited)
- The Lady Is Willing (1942) - Income Tax Man (uncredited)
- The Remarkable Andrew (1942) - Sam Marbery (uncredited)
- Larceny, Inc. (1942) - Mr. Buchanan
- The Wife Takes a Flyer (1942) - Adolphe Bietjelboer
- The Spoilers (1942) - Mr. Montrose - Clerk (uncredited)
- This Gun for Hire (1942) - Rooming House Manager
- Meet the Stewarts (1942) - Mr. Hamilton, Club Manager (uncredited)
- My Favorite Spy (1942) - Higgenbotham
- Yankee Doodle Dandy (1942) - Harold Goff
- Joan of Ozark (1942) - Salesman (uncredited)
- Tales of Manhattan (1942) - Mr. Langehanke (Fields sequence) (uncredited)
- Pardon My Sarong (1942) - Bus Company Checker (uncredited)
- Just Off Broadway (1942) - Sperty
- Henry Aldrich, Editor (1942) - Drug Store Clerk
- Get Hep to Love (1942) - Mr. Tolly (uncredited)
- The Forest Rangers (1942) - Judge (uncredited)
- George Washington Slept Here (1942) - Apartment Hunter (uncredited)
- Star Spangled Rhythm (1942) - Air-Raid Warden - Bob Hope Skit (uncredited)
- No Place for a Lady (1943) - Yvonne
- The Meanest Man in the World (1943) - Lawyer (uncredited)
- Sagebrush Law (1943) - Cowhand with Whiskey Jug (uncredited)
- Chatterbox (1943) - Wilfred Peckinpaugh
- The More the Merrier (1943) - Hotel Clerk (uncredited)
- Three Hearts for Julia (1943) - Man with Binoculars (uncredited)
- The Desperadoes (1943) - Rollo (uncredited)
- False Faces (1943) - Apartment Manager
- Du Barry Was a Lady (1943) - Dr. Pullit (uncredited)
- Crime Doctor (1943) - Headwaiter (uncredited)
- The Good Fellows (1943) - Abner Merritt (uncredited)
- Someone to Remember (1943) - Mr. Roseby
- The West Side Kid (1943) - Gwylim
- So's Your Uncle (1943) - Dinwiddle
- I Dood It (1943) - Hotel Manager With Flowers (uncredited)
- Crazy House (1943) - Fud
- Princess O'Rourke (1943) - Mr. Mookle (uncredited)
- Swing Fever (1943) - Mr. Milbane, Manager of Telephone Company (uncredited)
- Here Comes Elmer (1943) - Postelwaite
- What a Woman (1943) - Dormitory Clerk (uncredited)
- Sing a Jingle (1944) - Hendricks (uncredited)
- Henry Aldrich, Boy Scout (1944) - Mr. Pollup (uncredited)
- Hat Check Honey (1944) - Uniformed Officer
- Rationing (1944) - Roberts
- Bermuda Mystery (1944) - Angela's Father (uncredited)
- 3 Men in White (1944) - Mr. Burns (uncredited)
- Johnny Doesn't Live Here Any More (1944) - Mr. Collins
- Reckless Age (1944) - Jerkins
- Arsenic and Old Lace (1944) - Dr. Gilchrist
- Ever Since Venus (1944) - Milquetoast Customer (uncredited)
- San Diego, I Love You (1944) - Percy Caldwell
- My Gal Loves Music (1944) - Doctor (uncredited)
- Nothing but Trouble (1944) - Clerk in 1944 (uncredited)
- The Falcon in Hollywood (1944) - Hotel Manager (uncredited)
- The Town Went Wild (1944) - Mr. Kurtz (uncredited)
- Lake Placid Serenade (1944) - Haines (uncredited)
- Nothing But the Truth (1944)
- She Gets Her Man (1945) - Charlie, in Play
- Roughly Speaking (1945) - The Proprietor (uncredited)
- The Man Who Walked Alone (1945) - Mr. Monroe
- The Clock (1945) - Michael Henry, Judge's Clerk (uncredited)
- Earl Carroll Vanities (1945) - Mr. Weems
- Two O'Clock Courage (1945) - Mr. Daniels (uncredited)
- Swing Out, Sister (1945) - Mr. Gaston (uncredited)
- Blonde Ransom (1945) - Clerk
- Dangerous Partners (1945) - The Diner (uncredited)
- Wonder Man (1945) - Man on Bus (uncredited)
- Blonde from Brooklyn (1945) - Mr. Weams (uncredited)
- On Stage Everybody (1945) - Tupper (uncredited)
- Anchors Aweigh (1945) - Iturbi's Assistant
- Guest Wife (1945) - Urban Nichols
- Lady on a Train (1945) - Train Conductor (uncredited)
- Arson Squad (1945) - Sam Purdy
- Mildred Pierce (1945) - Mr. Jones (uncredited)
- Abbott and Costello in Hollywood (1945) - Mr. Burvis (uncredited)
- She Went to the Races (1945) - Wallace Mason
- Sing Your Way Home (1945) - Heathcliffe (uncredited)
- Saratoga Trunk (1945) - Hotel Clerk (uncredited)
- The Sailor Takes a Wife (1945) - Lone Diner (uncredited)
- The Gentleman Misbehaves (1946) - Quackenbush (uncredited)
- Cinderella Jones (1946) - Krencher
- To Each His Own (1946) - Clarence Ingham (uncredited)
- Two Sisters from Boston (1946) - George - Opera Stage Doorman (uncredited)
- One Exciting Week (1946) - Mayor Clarence Teeple
- Inside Job (1946) - Husband (uncredited)
- Night and Day (1946) - Music Publisher (uncredited)
- Canyon Passage (1946) - Portland Storekeeper (uncredited)
- Two Guys from Milwaukee (1946) - Manicure Customer - Mr. Carruthers (uncredited)
- Down Missouri Way (1946) - Prof. Shaw
- Spook Busters (1946) - Brown
- Angel on My Shoulder (1946) - Kramer (uncredited)
- No Leave, No Love (1946) - Mr. Tansey (uncredited)
- That Brennan Girl (1946) - Man in Night Club with Quarter (uncredited)
- The Secret Heart (1946) - Old Man (uncredited)
- The Time, the Place and the Girl (1946) - Jeff's Apartment Manager (uncredited)
- Easy Come, Easy Go (1947) - Waiter (uncredited)
- Suddenly It's Spring (1947) - Workman (uncredited)
- Hit Parade of 1947 (1947) - Radio Station Assistant (uncredited)
- It Happened on Fifth Avenue (1947) - Phillips (uncredited)
- A Likely Story (1947) - Doctor Brown (uncredited)
- Copacabana (1947) - Hotel Night Clerk (uncredited)
- Web of Danger (1947) - Cornflakes Eater
- Living in a Big Way (1947) - Union Leader (uncredited)
- The Crimson Key (1947) - Hotel Clerk (uncredited)
- The Perils of Pauline (1947) - Willie Millick (uncredited)
- Something in the Wind (1947) - Albert Beamis (uncredited)
- Joe Palooka in the Knockout (1947) - Hotel Clerk
- Always Together (1947) - Furrier (uncredited)
- Mary Lou (1948) - Cheever Chesney
- On Our Merry Way (1948) - Bank Teller (uncredited)
- On an Island with You (1948) - Tommy (uncredited)
- Best Man Wins (1948) - Villager (uncredited)
- Blondie's Reward (1948) - Leroy J. Blodgett
- Train to Alcatraz (1948) - Train Conductor Yelvington
- Joe Palooka in Winner Take All (1948) - Doniger
- Singin' Spurs (1948) - Mr. Totter
- The Strange Mrs. Crane (1948) - Fred Marlow
- Jiggs and Maggie in Court (1948) - Worker
- Blondie's Big Deal (1949) - Mayor A.K. Ramsey
- My Dream Is Yours (1949) - Party Guest (uncredited)
- Ringside (1949) - Timid Man
- The Girl from Jones Beach (1949) - Collection Agent (uncredited)
- Mighty Joe Young (1949) - Doctor (uncredited)
- In the Good Old Summertime (1949) - Sheet Music Customer (uncredited)
- Mary Ryan, Detective (1950) - Chester Wiggin (uncredited)
- Square Dance Jubilee (1949) - Yes-Man
- Bride for Sale (1949) - Mr. Baker (uncredited)
- Master Minds (1949) - Mike Barton
- The Great Lover (1949) - Passenger Drinking in Cabin (uncredited)
- Bodyhold (1949) - Little Spectator in Crowd (uncredited)
- The Good Humor Man (1950) - Meek Man (uncredited)
- Kill the Umpire (1950) - Man Talking to Wife on Phone (uncredited)
- Lucky Losers (1950) - Conventioneer from Paducah
- Joe Palooka in Humphrey Takes a Chance (1950) - Upperbottom
- Hit Parade of 1951 (1950) - Haberdashery Clerk (uncredited)
- Belle Le Grand (1951) - Secretary (uncredited)
- Stop That Cab (1951) - Lucy's Father
- Kentucky Jubilee (1951) - Mayor Horace Tilbury
- All That I Have (1951) - Juror Meek
- Colorado Sundown (1952) - Lawyer Davis
- Scared Stiff (1953) - Man with Spaghetti on Head (uncredited) (final film role)
