= Gladys Blake =

American actress (1910–1983)

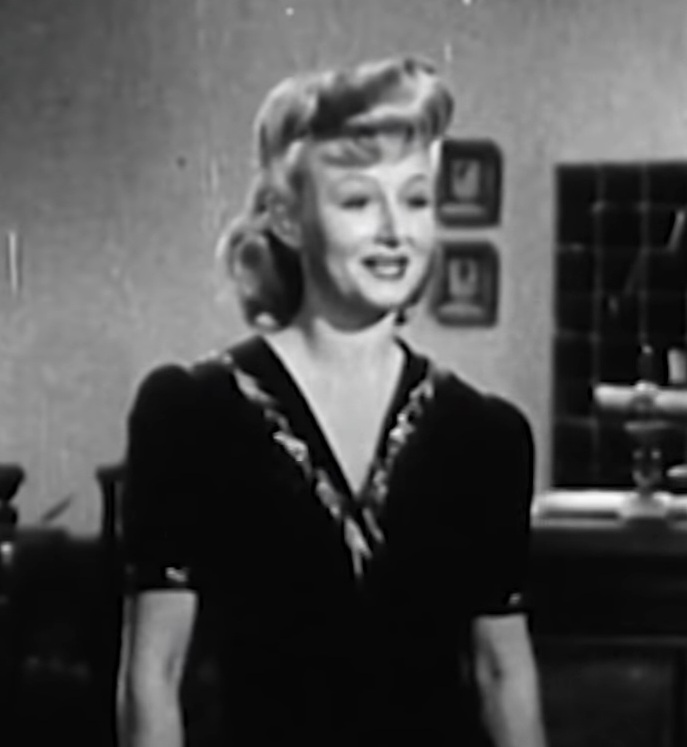
- Blake in Career Girl (1944)
- Born: Gladys Timmons; May 12, 1910; Luray, Virginia, U.S.
- Died: May 21, 1983 (aged 73); Sacramento, California, U.S.
- Occupation: Actress
- Years active: 1933–1952
- Spouse: Lee Gresham

Gladys Blake (born Gladys Timmons; May 12, 1910 – May 21, 1983) was an American character actress from the 1930s to the 1950s.

== Biography ==
Blake was born on January 12, 1910, in Luray, Virginia. Her mother, Ada Timmons, died when Gladys was less than a year old.

At fourteen, she entered the theater world in a stock company, before moving on to vaudeville. In vaudeville, she met her husband, Lee Gresham, and the two formed an act together. While performing in Los Angeles, they were noticed by producer Edward Small, which led to her beginning in the film industry.

Blake made her film debut in a small role in I Have Lived (1933), directed by Richard Thorpe. She had her first featured role later that same year in Rainbow over Broadway, which Thorpe also directed.

Over her 20-year career, she appeared in over 100 films. She was noted for playing very talkative supporting roles.

Appearing mostly in supporting or bit parts, she was occasionally given a featured role, as in Lucky Night (1939), which starred Myrna Loy and Robert Taylor; or Woman of the Year (1942), which starred Spencer Tracy and Katharine Hepburn, in which she played Flo Peters, the wife of a friend of Tracy's character. Even more rarely she would be given the lead in a film, such as in Racing Blood (1936). In the early 1940s, she played the recurring role of "Maisie" in several of the Dr. Kildare films starring Lew Ayres, Lionel Barrymore, and Laraine Day.

Other notable films in which she appeared include: Ship Ahoy (1942), starring Eleanor Powell and Red Skelton; the Abbott and Costello film, Who Done It?; the 1943 version of Phantom of the Opera, starring Claude Rains; The Naughty Nineties, again with Abbott and Costello; On the Town; The Yellow Cab Man, starring Red Skelton; and the 1952 epic, The Greatest Show on Earth.

Blake's final role was in 1952's This Woman is Dangerous, starring Joan Crawford and Dennis Morgan, in which she plays a garrulous hairdresser.

Blake died on May 21, 1983, aged 73, in Sacramento, California.

== Filmography ==
(Per AFI database)

- By Appointment Only (1933)
- I Have Lived (1933)
- Rainbow Over Broadway (1933)
- Sing Sinner Sing (1933)
- My Weakness (1933)
- The Important Witness (1933)
- Coming Out Party (1934)
- Marrying Widows (1934)
- One in a Million (1934)
- Servants' Entrance (1934)
- Racing Blood (1936)
- There's That Woman Again (1938)
- The Cisco Kid and the Lady (1939)
- Lucky Night (1939)
- The Women (1939)
- Fast and Furious (1939)
- Tell No Tales (1939)
- Money to Burn (1939)
- When Tomorrow Comes (1939)
- Broadway Melody of 1940 (1940)
- The Earl of Chicago (1940)
- I Love You Again (1940)
- Sailor's Lady (1940)
- Dr. Kildare's Crisis (1940)
- Street of Memories (1940)
- The Golden Fleecing (1940)
- Andy Hardy Meets Debutante (1940)
- Young as You Feel (1940)
- Niagara Falls (1941)
- Bachelor Daddy (1941)
- Dr. Kildare's Wedding Day (1941)
- The Lady from Cheyenne (1941)
- Lucky Devils (1941)
- Married Bachelor (1941)
- The People vs. Dr. Kildare (1941)
- We Go Fast (1941)
- West Point Widow (1941)
- Johnny Eager (1942)
- Mr. & Mrs. North (1942)
- Fly-by-Night (1942)
- Henry Aldrich, Editor (1942)
- The Magnificent Dope (1942)
- Seven Sweethearts (1942)
- Ship Ahoy (1942)
- Who Done It? (1942)
- Woman of the Year (1942)
- Fired Wife (1943)
- Footlight Glamour (1943)
- Jitterbugs (1943)
- The More the Merrier (1943)
- My Kingdom for a Cook (1943)
- Phantom of the Opera (1943)
- Star Spangled Rhythm (1943)
- A Stranger in Town (1943)
- Top Man (1943)
- Career Girl (1944)
- Johnny Doesn't Live Here Anymore (1944)
- In Society (1944)
- Hi, Beautiful (1944)
- Chip Off the Old Block (1944)
- Can't Help Singing (1944)
- Meet Miss Bobby Socks (1944)
- Practically Yours (1944)
- Reckless Age (1944)
- She's a Soldier Too (1944)
- Swingtime Johnny (1944)
- Army Wives (1944)
- Bewitched (1945)
- Her Highness and the Bellboy (1945)
- Her Lucky Night (1945)
- Let's Go Steady (1945)
- The Naughty Nineties (1945)
- Over 21 (1945)
- Rockin' in the Rockies (1945)
- There Goes Kelly (1945)
- Under Western Skies (1945)
- Because of Him (1946)
- The Gentleman Misbehaves (1946)
- Live Wires (1946)
- The Magnificent Rogue (1946)
- Nocturne (1946)
- Shadows Over Chinatown (1946)
- She Wrote the Book (1946)
- Strange Triangle (1946)
- To Each His Own (1946)
- Fear in the Night (1947)
- Scared to Death (1947)
- Dream Girl (1948)
- Hazard (1948)
- Michael O'Halloran (1948)
- Money Madness (1948)
- Night Has a Thousand Eyes (1948)
- Smart Woman (1948)
- The Time of Your Life (1948)
- The Accused (1949)
- Ladies of the Chorus (1949)
- On the Town (1949)
- Paid in Full (1950)
- The Yellow Cab Man (1950)
- The Greatest Show on Earth (1952)
- This Woman Is Dangerous (1952)
