= The Gentleman Misbehaves =

1946 film by George Sherman

- Directed by: George Sherman
- Written by: Robert Wyler; Richard Weil; John B. Clymer
- Produced by: Alexis Thurn-Taxis
- Starring: Bob Haymes; Osa Massen; Hillary Brooke
- Cinematography: Philip Tannura
- Edited by: Gene Havlick
- Music by: Mario Silva
- Production company: Columbia Pictures
- Distributed by: Columbia Pictures
- Release date: February 28, 1946
- Running time: 74 minutes
- Country: United States
- Language: English

The Gentleman Misbehaves is a 1946 American musical comedy film directed by George Sherman and starring Bob Haymes and Hillary Brooke. It was produced and distributed by Columbia Pictures.

== Cast ==
- Bob Haymes as Edgar Raleigh
- Osa Massen as Chincilla
- Hillary Brooke as Nina Mallory
- Frank Sully as Taxi Driver
- Dusty Anderson as Marian Rand
- Shemp Howard as Marty
- Sheldon Leonard as Trigger Stazzi
- Jimmy Lloyd as Jimmy Drake
- Gladys Blake as PBX Operator
- Chester Clute as Quackenbush
- Alphonse Martell as Captain
