= Betty Kean =

American actress (1914–1986)

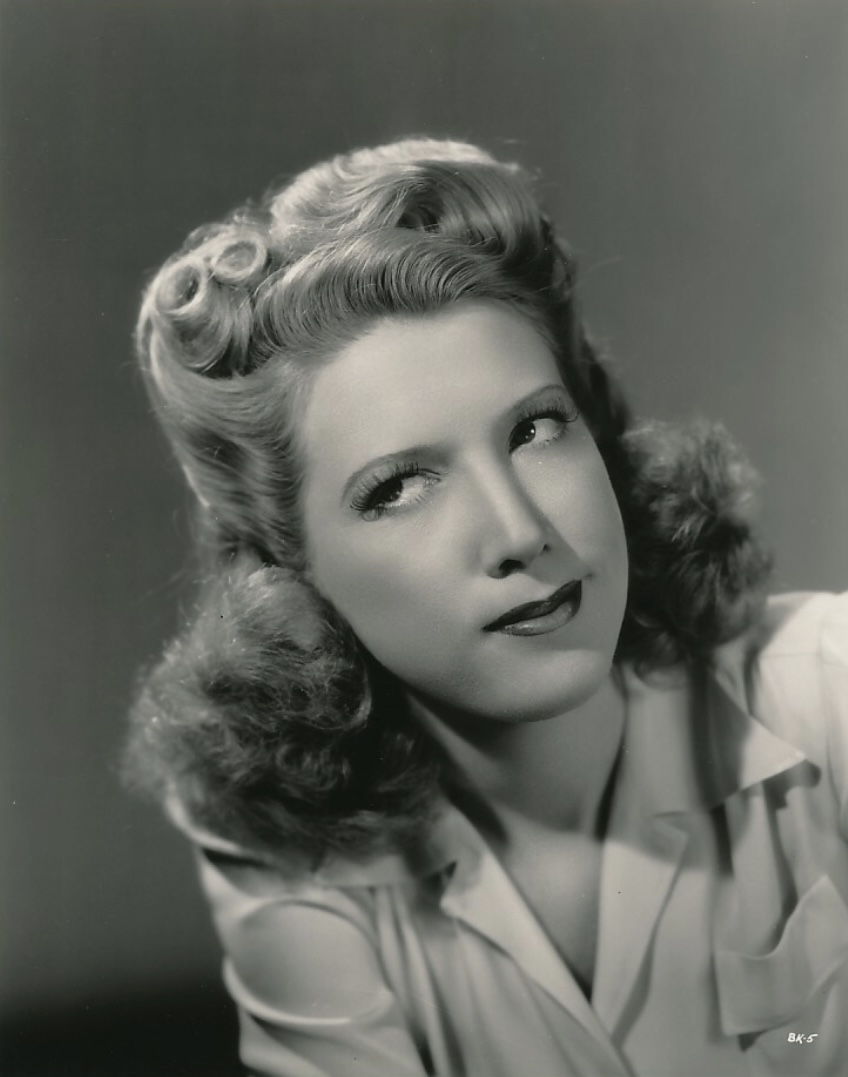
- Kean in 1944
- Born: December 15, 1914; Hartford, Connecticut, U.S.
- Died: September 29, 1986 (aged 71); Los Angeles, California, U.S.
- Occupation: Actress
- Years active: 1942–1986
- Spouses: Roy Sedley (m. 1934; ann. 1936) Frank Fay (m. 1937; div. 1939) Jim Backus (m. 1939; div. 1942) Lew Parker (m. 1956; died 1972)
- Children: 2

Betty Kean (December 15, 1914 – September 29, 1986) was an actress and part of the 1950s era comedy duo the Kean Sisters with her sister Jane Kean. She married four times, to actors including Jim Backus and her last husband Lew Parker. She died in 1986 of cancer in Hollywood.

== Early years ==
Kean was born in Hartford, Connecticut, the daughter of Robert and Helen Kean, in 1914. She was educated at the Chauncey Harris School and Hartford Public High School. Her parents produced shows in Hartford and played a key role in her involvement in show business. In addition to performing on Hartford stages, she acted on the Betty and Burt Show on WDRC radio in Hartford. When she was 14 years old, she performed for a summer with a vaudeville group.

== Career ==
Kean began her career as a dancer. When a slippery floor for one performance caused her to almost fall a couple of times, she improvised ("hammed it up a bit", she said later). Jack Benny was in the audience; after he told her that the performance was funny, she began incorporating comedy into her routine.

Kean starred in George White's Music Hall Varieties on Broadway in 1932. Her other Broadway credits included Crazy With the Heat (1941), The Sun Field (1942), Along Fifth Avenue (1949), and Ankles Aweigh (1955).

Kean's film debut came in Moonlight Masquerade (1942). She also appeared in Gals, Incorporated, Sing a Jingle and Hi, Good Lookin'!, among others.

During the 1950s she was part, along her sister Jane, of the comedy duo the Kean Sisters, which worked the nightclub circuit throughout the 1940s and 1950s and appeared on Broadway in the 1955 musical, Ankles Aweigh. They formed the team at the suggestion of TV host Ed Sullivan. After the sisters had appeared separately on episodes of his program, he suggested that they develop an act together for another episode. They went on to appear on his show about 20 times in addition to performing together in other settings.

On television, Kean portrayed Amy Tucker on Leave It to Larry. Other TV shows on which she appeared included Naked City, The Andy Griffith Show, My World and Welcome to It, and The Love Boat.

One of her last television appearances was in the February 22, 1986, episode of The Facts of Life, “The Lady Who Came to Dinner” as a traveling vaudevillian performer whom Tootie hires for the entertainment during Blair’s 21st birthday.

Her final film credit was Dreamscape in 1984.

== Personal life ==
Kean married Roy Sedley secretly on November 17, 1934. In June 1936 she sought an annulment based on the fact that when he was divorced 12 years earlier he was forbidden to marry again as long as his ex-wife lived. Kean said that she never lived with Sedley, and he did not contest the suit. The annulment was granted. She was also married to Frank Fay from 1937 to 1939, with whom she had one daughter, Cathy Jane Fay, to Jim Backus from 1939 to 1942 and lastly to Lew Parker from 1956 to 1972 with whom she had another daughter, Deirdre.

== Death ==
Kean died of cancer in Los Angeles on September 29, 1986, aged 69.

== Selected filmography ==
=== Film ===
- Moonlight Masquerade (1942) - Mikki Marquette
- Gals, Incorporated (1943) - Bets Moran
- Sing a Jingle (1944) - Myrtle
- Hi, Good Lookin'! (1944) - Peggy
- Slightly Terrific (1944) - Marie Mason
- Murder in the Blue Room (1944) - Betty
- My Gal Loves Music (1944) - Peggy Quinn
- The Fifth Floor (1978) - Sophy
- The Seduction (1982) - Mrs. Caluso
- Dreamscape (1984) - Grandma

=== Television ===
- Fireside Theatre - Meet My Sister (1949) TV Episode
- Naked City - Make It Fifty Dollars and Add Love to Nona (1962) TV Episode .... Mrs. Kelvin
- The Andy Griffith Show - A Visit to Barney Fife (1967) TV Episode .... Ma Parker
- My World and Welcome to It - Seal in the Bedroom (1969) TV Episode .... Mrs. Monroe
- That Girl - That Girl's Daddy (1970) TV Episode .... Mrs. McCarty
- Happy Days - Fonzie the Father (1976) TV Episode .... Millie
- Police Woman - Night of the Full Moon (1976) TV Episode .... Charlene's Landlady
- The Bob Newhart Show - Of Mice and Men (1977) TV Episode .... Flo
- The Love Boat - Ex Plus Y/Golden Agers/Graham and Kelly (1977) TV Episode .... Mrs. Svenson
- Diff'rent Strokes - Sam's Missing (1985) TV Episode .... Sally Winkle
- The Facts of Life - The Lady Who Came to Dinner (1986) TV Episode .... Louise Le Beau
