= Babes on Swing Street =

1944 film

- Film poster
- Directed by: Edward C. Lilley
- Screenplay by: Howard Dimsdale; Eugene Conrad
- Based on: Merrily We Sing story by Brenda Weisberg
- Produced by: Bernard W. Burton
- Starring: Ann Blyth; Peggy Ryan; Andy Devine; Leon Errol
- Cinematography: Jerome Ash
- Edited by: Fred R. Feitshans Jr.
- Distributed by: Universal Pictures
- Release date: October 27, 1944
- Running time: 69 minutes
- Country: United States
- Language: English

Babes on Swing Street is a 1944 musical comedy film directed by Edward C. Lilley and starring Ann Blyth, Peggy Ryan, and Andy Devine. It was produced by Universal Pictures.

== Plot ==
Barber's daughter Trudy Costello gives close shaves at her dad Joe's barber shop. She has other skills as well, so becomes excited when classmate Carol Curtis informs her that talent scouts are coming to town to audition young performers.

The kids decide to open a nightclub of their own, needing a place and the money to pay for it. Carol's wealthy aunt Martha wants no part of it, but amiable uncle Malcolm is willing to put up the fee. Malcolm is insure if he can get his hands on his inheritance yet, so he fools Martha into believing that a hall they own is being used for artistic purposes.

Rehearsals go smoothly until Carol's old rival Fern Wallace turns up and vies with her for the same boy's attention. Eventually, however, the show goes on, with Malcolm getting his money and Martha giving her reluctant blessing.

== Cast ==
- Ann Blyth as Carol Curtis
- Peggy Ryan as Trudy Costello
- Andy Devine as Joe Costello
- Leon Errol as Malcolm
- Alma Kruger as Martha
- June Preisser as Fern
- Kirby Grant as Dick
- Anne Gwynne as Frances

== See also ==
- List of American films of 1944
