= Arson Squad =

- Theatrical release poster
- Directed by: Lew Landers
- Screenplay by: Arthur St. Claire
- Produced by: Arthur Alexander
- Starring: Frank Albertson; Robert Armstrong; Grace Albertson; Byron Foulger; Chester Clute; Jerry Jerome; Arthur Loft
- Cinematography: Benjamin H. Kline
- Edited by: Holbrook N. Todd
- Production company: Alexander-Stern Productions
- Distributed by: Producers Releasing Corporation
- Release date: September 11, 1945
- Running time: 66 minutes
- Country: United States
- Language: English

Arson Squad is a 1945 American crime film directed by Lew Landers and written by Arthur St. Claire. The film stars Frank Albertson, Robert Armstrong, Grace Albertson, Byron Foulger, Chester Clute, Jerry Jerome and Arthur Loft. The film was released on September 11, 1945, by Producers Releasing Corporation.

== Cast ==
- Frank Albertson as Tom Mitchell
- Robert Armstrong as Capt. Joe Dugan
- Grace Albertson as Judy Mason
- Byron Foulger as Amos Baxter
- Chester Clute as Sam Purdy
- Jerry Jerome as Mike C. Crandall
- Arthur Loft as Cyrus P. Clevenger
- Rod Rogers as Nick
- Stewart Garner as Bill Roberts
- Frank Wayne as Tracy
- Ed Cassidy as Chief O'Neill
- Casey MacGregor as O'Malley
- Herman Scharff as John W. Rawlins
- Ezelle Poule as Miss McKee
