= Racing Blood (1936 film) =

1936 film by Victor Halperin

- Theatrical release poster
- Directed by: Victor Halperin
- Screenplay by: Joseph O'Donnell
- Based on: Lionized by Peter B. Kyne
- Produced by: Maurice Conn
- Starring: Frankie Darro; Kane Richmond; Gladys Blake; Arthur Housman; James Eagles; Matthew Betz; Si Wills; Fred Toones
- Cinematography: Robert Doran; William Hyer; Jack Greenhalgh
- Edited by: Martin G. Cohn
- Production company: Conn Pictures Corporation
- Distributed by: Conn Pictures Corporation
- Release date: November 15, 1936
- Running time: 61 minutes
- Country: United States
- Language: English

Racing Blood is a 1936 American crime film directed by Victor Halperin and written by Joseph O'Donnell. The film stars Frankie Darro, Kane Richmond, Gladys Blake, Arthur Housman, James Eagles, Matthew Betz, Si Wills and Fred Toones. The film was released on November 15, 1936, by Conn Pictures Corporation.

== Cast ==
- Frankie Darro as Frankie Reynolds
- Kane Richmond as Clay Harrison
- Gladys Blake as Phyllis Reynolds
- Arthur Housman as Legs
- James Eagles as Smokey Reynolds
- Matthew Betz as Tex O'Donnell
- Si Wills as Dopey
- Fred Toones as Sad Sam
- Bob Tansill as Magnus
