= Allergic to Love =

1944 film by Edward C. Lilley

- Directed by: Edward C. Lilley (as Edward Lilley)
- Screenplay by: Warren Wilson
- Story by: Warren Wilson; John Francis Larkin (as John Larkin); Jack Townley
- Starring: Martha O'Driscoll; Noah Beery Jr. David Bruce
- Cinematography: George Robinson
- Edited by: Philip Cahn
- Color process: Black and white
- Production company: Universal Pictures
- Distributed by: Universal Pictures
- Release date: July 21, 1944
- Running time: 60 minutes
- Country: United States
- Language: English

Allergic to Love is a 1944 American comedy musical romance film directed by Edward C. Lilley and starring Martha O'Driscoll, Noah Beery Jr. and David Bruce.

The film's plot centers on a bride (O'Driscoll) who appears to be allergic to her husband (Beery). Warren Wilson wrote the film's scenario and was associate producer.

== Plot ==
Arranged marriage. Bride-to-be develops allergies to future husband.

== Cast ==
- Martha O'Driscoll as Pat Bradley
- Noah Beery Jr. as Kip Henderson
- David Bruce as J. Roger Mace
- Franklin Pangborn as Stewart Ives III
- Fuzzy Knight as Charlie
- Maxie Rosenbloom as Max
- Henry Armetta as Louie
- Marek Windheim as Dr. Kardos
- Paul Stanton as Mr. Bradley
- Olive Blakeney as Mrs. Bradley
- Grady Sutton as Cuthbert
- William B. Davidson as Mr. Henderson (as William Davidson)
- John Hamilton as Dr. McLaughlan
- George Chandler as Joe
- Olin Howland as Sam Walker (as Olin Howlin)
- Lotte Stein as Mrs. Beamish
- Edna Holland as Miss Peabody
- Dudley Dickerson as Whitey
- Chinita as Chinita
- The Guadalajara Trio as The Guadalajara Trio
- Lola Montes as Musical Specialty (as Antonio Triana and Montes)
- Antonio Triana as Musical Specialty (as Antonio Triana and Montes

== See also ==
- List of American films of 1944
