= Meet Miss Bobby Socks =

1944 film directed by Glenn Tryon

- Theatrical release poster
- Directed by: Glenn Tryon
- Written by: Jaime Olguin
- Screenplay by: Muriel Roy Bolton
- Story by: Muriel Roy Bolton
- Produced by: Ted Richmond
- Starring: Bob Crosby; Lynn Merrick; Louise Erickson; Robert White; Howard Freeman
- Cinematography: George Meehan
- Edited by: Jerome Thoms
- Music by: George Duning
- Production company: Columbia Pictures
- Distributed by: Columbia Pictures
- Release date: October 12, 1944
- Running time: 68 minutes
- Country: United States
- Language: English

Meet Miss Bobby Socks is a 1944 American musical comedy film directed by Glenn Tryon and starring Bob Crosby and Lynn Merrick. The film was released by Columbia Pictures on October 12, 1944.

== Cast ==
- Bob Crosby as Don Collins
- Lynn Merrick as Helen Tyler
- Louise Erickson as Susan Tyler
- Robert White as Howard Barnes
- Howard Freeman as Tom Tyler
- Kim Loo Sisters as Speciality Act
- Louis Jordan as Louis Jordan
- The Tympany Five as themselves
- Bob Alden as Bob (uncredited)
- Venna Archer as Jitterbug (uncredited)
- Carla Balenda as Pillow (uncredited)
- Gladys Blake as Mrs. Loomis (uncredited)
- Marguerite Campbell as Bobby Sock Girl (uncredited)
- Bill Chaney as Jitterbug (uncredited)
- Mary Currier as Mrs. Tyler (uncredited)
- Daisy as Thirsty (uncredited)
- Pauline Drake as Receptionist (uncredited)
- Toni Eden as Bobby Sock Girl (uncredited)
- Raoul Freeman as Guard (uncredited)
- Helen Gerald as Bobby Sock Girl (uncredited)
- John Hamilton as R. N. Swanson (uncredited)
- Rex Lease as Guard (uncredited)
- Nelson Leigh as Henry Bricker (uncredited)
- Teddy Mangean as Messenger (uncredited)
- Alphonse Martell as Headwaiter (uncredited)
- Forbes Murray as Colonel (uncredited)
- Pat Parrish as Gloria (uncredited)
- Joey Ray as Announcer (uncredited)
- Syd Saylor as Harry Loomis (uncredited)
- Michel Silva as Michel (uncredited)
- John Tyrrell as Waiter Captain (uncredited)
- Pierre Watkin as Quinlan (uncredited)
- Florence Wix as Nightclub Patron (uncredited)
- Douglas Wood as Principal Whitaker (uncredited)

== Production ==
Robert White was cast on the basis of his performance on Broadway in Kiss and Tell. Filming took place in June 1944.

== See also ==
- Bobby-soxer
