= Larceny with Music =

1943 film

- Directed by: Edward Lilley
- Written by: Robert Harari
- Produced by: Howard Benedict
- Starring: Leo Carrillo, Allan Jones, Kitty Carlisle, Alvino Rey
- Cinematography: Paul Ivano
- Edited by: Paul Landres
- Music by: Charles Previn, Frank De Vol, Ted Cain
- Distributed by: Universal Pictures
- Release date: 1943
- Running time: 64 minutes
- Country: United States
- Language: English

Larceny with Music is a 1943 musical comedy featuring singer Allan Jones and band leader Alvino Rey.

== Plot ==
Believing unknown singer Ken Daniels is heir to a fortune, Hotel Deauville proprietor Gus Borelli hires him to headline with the Alvino Rey band. Hotel singer Pamela Mason is demoted to maid and waitress, after which she discovers that the Daniels inheritance was a rumor concocted for publicity by agent Mike Simms. Borelli threatens to kill Daniels when he realizes he was duped by a publicity gimmick, but doesn't as he notices his hotel showroom is packed with customers.

== Cast ==
- Leo Carrillo as Gus Borelli
- Kitty Carlisle as Pamela Mason
- Allan Jones as Ken Daniels
- William Frawley as Mike Simms
- Lee Patrick as Agatha Perkinson
- King Sisters
- Alvino Rey
