= Swing Out, Sister =

1945 film

- Directed by: Edward C. Lilley
- Written by: Henry Blankfort; Eugene Conrad (story); Edward Dein (story)
- Produced by: Bernard W. Burton
- Starring: Rod Cameron; Frances Raeburn; Arthur Treacher; Fuzzy Knight; Billie Burke
- Cinematography: Paul Ivano
- Edited by: Edward Curtiss
- Music by: Milton Rosen
- Distributed by: Universal Pictures
- Release date: May 18, 1945
- Running time: 60 minutes
- Country: United States
- Language: English

Swing Out, Sister is a 1945 American musical comedy film directed by Edward C. Lilley and starring Arthur Treacher, Rod Cameron and Billie Burke.

== Plot ==
Two people get jobs anonymously at a jazz club without telling their upper-class families.

== Cast ==
- Rod Cameron as Geoffrey Cabot
- Billie Burke as Jessica Mariman
- Arthur Treacher as Chumley
- Frances Raeburn as Penelope Mariman / "Donna Leslie"
- Jacqueline deWit as Pat Cameron
- Samuel S. Hinds as Rufus Mariman
- Fuzzy Knight as Clutch
- Milburn Stone as Tim Colby

== Cultural reference ==
The English pop duo Swing Out Sister took its name from the film.
