= Johnny Doesn't Live Here Anymore =

1944 film by Joe May

- Directed by: Joe May
- Written by: Alice Means Reeve
- Screenplay by: Philip Yordan; John H. Kafka
- Produced by: Maurice King (producer); Frank King (associate producer)
- Starring: Simone Simon; James Ellison; William Terry
- Cinematography: Ira H. Morgan
- Edited by: Martin G. Cohn
- Music by: W. Franke Harling
- Production company: Monogram Pictures
- Distributed by: Monogram Pictures
- Release date: July 8, 1944
- Running time: 79 minutes
- Country: United States
- Language: English

Johnny Doesn't Live Here Anymore is a 1944 American romantic comedy film starring Simone Simon, James Ellison, William Terry, and featuring Robert Mitchum in an early role. Produced by King Brothers Productions, it was co-written by Philip Yordan and directed by the Austrian director Joe May, and constitutes the final film directed by Joe May. It was based on a short story purchased by the King Brothers. The film has fantasy elements, with the main character being followed by a gremlin.

The film's interest and charm derives in large part from its extremely varied cast of supporting players. Although Robert Mitchum's role in the film has come to be emphasized for marketing purposes, he was not yet a star and only appears in the last twenty minutes or so of the film. Horror film staple Rondo Hatton gets a laugh in a brief cameo as an undertaker. Billy Laughlin, known at the time as "Froggy" in the Our Gang shorts, plays a set of twins who live in Simon's apartment building; it is his only non-Our Gang role and one of the few times he speaks in his natural voice on film.

== Plot ==
On a train headed from her home province of Quebec, Kathie Aumont accidentally spills salt. Deeply superstitious, she believes this condemns her to seven weeks of bad luck. She is correct, as she is thereafter pursued by a mischievous bad luck Gremlin named B.O. Rumpelstilskin (Jerry Maren, voiced by an uncredited Mel Blanc). When she arrives at her destination, she finds that her friend Sally, with whom she was going to live, is newly married. This leaves Kathie with nowhere to sleep. Luckily she meets a newly inducted Marine, Johnny. He gives her the key to his apartment and says she can stay there while he is away. Unluckily Johnny has also given keys to all his friends. Confusion, comedy and romance follows.

The wartime housing shortage in various large urban areas was a recurrent subject for American comedies during World War II. This film was distinctive in that it was a comedy-fantasy.

== Cast ==
- Simone Simon as Kathie Aumont
- James Ellison as Mike Burke
- William Terry as Johnny Moore
- Minna Gombell as Mrs. Collins
- Chick Chandler as Jack
- Alan Dinehart as Judge
- Gladys Blake as Sally
- Robert Mitchum as CPO Jeff Daniels
- Dorothy Granger as Irene
- Grady Sutton as George
- Chester Clute as Mr. Collins
- Fern Emmett as Shrew
- Jerry Maren as Gremlin
- Janet Shaw as Gladys
- Charles Williams as Court Recorder
- Rondo Hatton as B. Graves, Undertaker
- Billy Laughlin as Jerry Malone and Jerry's Brother
- Fred Toones as Train Porter (uncredited)
