= Edward C. Lilley =

Edward Clark Lilley (1896–1974) was a director of musicals, operettas, and films in the United States. He worked for Universal Pictures.

== Broadway ==
- Walk with Music (1940)
- Panama Hattie (1940)
- Virginia

== Filmography ==
- Moonlight in Vermont (1943)
- Never a Dull Moment (1943)
- Larceny with Music (1943)
- Honeymoon Lodge (1943)
- Sing a Jingle (1943)
- Hi, Good Lookin'! (1944)
- My Gal Loves Music (1944), director and producer
- Allergic to Love (1944)
- Babes on Swing Street (1944)
- Swing Out, Sister (1945)
