= Swingtime Johnny =

1944 film by Edward F. Cline

- Directed by: Edward F. Cline
- Screenplay by: Clyde Bruckman
- Story by: Warren Wilson
- Produced by: Warren Wilson
- Starring: Patty Andrews; Maxene Andrews; Laverne Andrews
- Cinematography: Jerome Ash
- Edited by: Edward Curtiss
- Color process: Black and white
- Production company: Universal Pictures
- Distributed by: Universal Pictures
- Release dates: December 16, 1943 (New York City); February 4, 1944 (United States)
- Running time: 60 minutes
- Country: United States
- Language: English

Swingtime Johnny is a 1944 American comedy musical film directed by Edward F. Cline and starring Patty Andrews, Maxene Andrews and Laverne Andrews.

== Plot ==
A factory that manufactures pipe organs is converted into a munitions supplier for the war effort. While celebrating the firm's 50th anniversary at a nightclub, Jonathan Chadwick, the company's president, makes a spectacle of himself over underdressed performer Linda Lane, unaware that her striptease is a part of her act.

Linda ends up landing a job as Jonathan's secretary at the plant. She also discovers that a rival company about to purchase the entire enterprise from Jonathan is defrauding him, falsely claiming that the plant's shell casings are defective. Linda intends to leave for New York to resume her singing career until Jonathan persuades her to stay.

== Cast ==
- Patty Andrews as Patty Andrews
- Maxene Andrews as Maxene Andrews
- Laverne Andrews as Laverne Andrews
- Harriet Nelson as Linda (as Harriet Hillard)
- Peter Cookson as Jonathan
- Tim Ryan as Sparks
- Matt Willis as Monk
- William 'Bill' Philips as Steve
- Tom Dugan as Grugg
- Ray Walker as Mike
- Marion Martin as Flashy Blonde
- John Hamilton as Caldwell
- John Sheehan as Raffle Wheel Barker
- Syd Saylor as Sea Food Barker
- Jack Rice as Bill
- Emmett Vogan as Chairman of the Board
- Herbert Heywood as Pop
- Alphonse Martell as Pierre
- Mitchell Ayres as Self (as Mitch Ayres)
- Mitchell Ayres Orchestra as Orchestra

== See also ==
- List of American films of 1944
