= Hi, Good Lookin'! =

1944 film by Edward C. Lilley

- Theatrical release poster
- Directed by: Edward C. Lilley
- Screenplay by: Paul Gerard Smith; Bradford Ropes; Eugene Conrad
- Story by: Paul Gerard Smith
- Produced by: Frank Gross
- Starring: Harriet Nelson; Eddie Quillan; Kirby Grant; Betty Kean; Roscoe Karns; Vivian Austin; Marjorie Gateson; Fuzzy Knight
- Cinematography: Jerome Ash
- Edited by: Edgar Zane
- Production company: Universal Pictures
- Distributed by: Universal Pictures
- Release date: March 22, 1944
- Running time: 62 minutes
- Country: United States
- Language: English

Hi, Good Lookin'! is a 1944 American comedy film directed by Edward C. Lilley and written by Paul Gerard Smith, Bradford Ropes and Eugene Conrad. The film stars Harriet Nelson, Eddie Quillan, Kirby Grant, Betty Kean, Roscoe Karns, Vivian Austin, Marjorie Gateson and Fuzzy Knight. The film was released on March 22, 1944, by Universal Pictures.

== Plot ==
In an effort to help a pretty girl realize her dreams as a singer, a radio station usher impersonates a station executive.

== Cast ==
- Harriet Nelson as Kelly Clark
- Eddie Quillan as Dynamo Carson
- Kirby Grant as King Castle
- Betty Kean as Peggy
- Roscoe Karns as Archie
- Vivian Austin as Phyllis
- Marjorie Gateson as Mrs. Clara Hardacre
- Fuzzy Knight as Joe Smedley
- Milburn Stone as Bill Eaton
- Frank Fenton as Gib Dickson
- Robert Emmett Keane as Homer Hardacre
- Ozzie Nelson as himself
- Jack Teagarden as himself
- The Delta Rhythm Boys as Themselves
- Tip, Tap and Toe
