= Lake Placid Serenade =

1944 film by Steve Sekely

- Directed by: Steve Sekely
- Written by: Dick Irving Hyland; Doris Gilbert; Frederick Kohner
- Produced by: Harry Grey
- Starring: Vera Ralston; Eugene Pallette; Barbara Jo Allen
- Cinematography: John Alton
- Edited by: Arthur Roberts
- Music by: Joseph Dubin; Charles Maxwell; Walter Scharf
- Production company: Republic Pictures
- Distributed by: Republic Pictures
- Release date: December 23, 1944
- Running time: 85 minutes
- Country: United States
- Language: English

Lake Placid Serenade is a 1944 American musical romance film directed by Steve Sekely and starring Vera Ralston, Eugene Pallette and Barbara Jo Allen. Following the German invasion of Czechoslovakia a Czech ice-skating champion goes to stay with her Uncle in the United States.

It was made by Republic Pictures as a slightly higher-budget production than most of the studios' B Movies. The film's sets were designed by the art director Russell Kimball.

== Plot ==
Vera Haschek (Vera Ralston), training for the Czechoslovak national figure skating championship, is given a pair of hand-made skates by her Grandfather (Lloyd Corrigan). She wins the contest, impressing the Countess (Barbara Jo Allen), an ice show impresario. She tries to sign Vera to a long-term contract, but Vera resists. The Countess puts Vera in a show at the Ice Carnival in Lake Placid, New York, and Vera becomes an audience favourite.

When Vera learns that Nazi Germany has invaded Czechoslovakia, she is worried about her grandfather. She learns she has a rich uncle, Carl Cermak (Eugene Pallette), living in the United States. She seeks him out at his Long Island home, and is welcomed into his family. Her cousin Susan (Ruth Terry) is happy to see her, but her cousin Irene (Stephanie Bachelor) snubs her. Vera meets Paul Jordan (Robert Livingston), her uncle's business partner. The two fall in love, but Paul leaves the next day for a business meeting—neither having told the other their name. Meanwhile, Irene, who is infatuated with Paul, gives him a pipe for Christmas. When Paul meets Vera again a week later, she sees the pipe and believes she is stealing Paul from Irene. She flees the Cermak home and returns to Lake Placid.

Susan, realizing that Paul and Vera are in love, arranges for Paul to go to Lake Placid and tricks him into meeting Vera. She again flees the meeting, leaving one of her special skates behind. Vera now agrees to sign the contract with the Countess; her one condition is that her real name never be used. She goes on tour, and is a huge hit.

Meanwhile, Uncle Carl has located Vera's grandfather and brought him to the United States. Uncle Carl sees Vera's photo in an advertisement for an ice show, and brings Grandfather and Paul to the show. Paul returns Vera's skate. Irene admits that Paul doesn't love her, and Vera and Paul are happily reunited.

== Cast ==
- Vera Ralston as Vera Haschek
- Eugene Pallette as Carl Cermak
- Barbara Jo Allen as The Countess
- Robert Livingston as Paul Jordan
- Stephanie Bachelor as Irene Cermak
- Walter Catlett as Carlton Webb
- Lloyd Corrigan as Jaroslaw 'Papa' Haschek
- Ruth Terry as Susan Cermak
- William Frawley as Jiggers
- John Litel as Walter Benda
- Ferdinand Munier as Kris Kringle
- Roy Rogers as himself
- John Dehner as Radio Announcer (uncredited)
- Frank Mayo as Reporter (uncredited)

== See also ==
- List of American films of 1944

== Bibliography ==
- Len D. Martin. The Republic Pictures Checklist: Features, Serials, Cartoons, Short Subjects and Training Films of Republic Pictures Corporation, 1935–1959. McFarland, 1998.
