= Standing Room Only (1944 film) =

1944 film by Sidney Lanfield

- Directed by: Sidney Lanfield
- Written by: Darrell Ware; Karl Tunberg
- Produced by: Buddy DeSylva
- Starring: Fred MacMurray; Paulette Goddard
- Cinematography: Charles Lang
- Edited by: William Shea
- Music by: Robert Emmett Dolan
- Distributed by: Paramount Pictures
- Release date: January 7, 1944
- Running time: 81 minutes
- Country: United States
- Language: English

Standing Room Only is a 1944 American comedy film directed by Sidney Lanfield and starring Fred MacMurray and Paulette Goddard.

== Plot ==
Working on the assembly line at the Todd toy manufacturing company, Jane Rogers makes a mistake and is called before company general manager Lee Stevens, a man she has admired from afar. Lee's secretary is fired, at the request of his sweetheart Alice, daughter of factory owner T. J. Todd.

Jane talks her way into the job, pretending to have secretarial skills. Lee is leaving for Washington, D.C., in an effort to save the company from financial ruin. He intends to see government official Glen Ritchie there and propose the Todd factory be used in the war effort.

Jane does everything wrong. She cancels their hotel reservation and the whole town is booked solid. She and Lee end up sleeping outdoors. Ritchie isn't able to see Lee two days in a row, so Jane, under orders to get them any kind of room, makes a deal to stay with Ira Cromwell and his wife, but only by becoming their servants.

Lee is aghast at the idea but desperate to see Ritchie so forced to stay in town. The accident-prone Jane continues to cause problems, forgetting to cook the turkey for the Cromwells' dinner party. One night their guest turns out to be Ritchie, and to further complicate matters, Todd and daughter Alice turn up, too. Dinner is a fiasco, but Ritchie agrees to give the toy factory a government contract and by now Jane and Lee are in love.

== Cast ==
- Paulette Goddard as Jane
- Fred MacMurray as Lee
- Roland Young as Cromwell
- Edward Arnold as Todd
- Hillary Brooke as Alice
- Porter Hall as Hugo
- Clarence Kolb as Ritchie
- Marie McDonald as Opal
- Veda Ann Borg as Peggy

== Radio adaptation ==
Standing Room Only was presented on the October 30th, 1944 episode of Lux Radio Theatre, with Goddard and MacMurray reprising their roles.

It was later presented on the November 23, 1952 episode of Broadway Playhouse; the 30-minute adaptation starred Goddard.
