= Army Wives (1944 film) =

1944 American film directed by Phil Rosen

- Directed by: Phil Rosen
- Screenplay by: B. Harrison Orkow
- Story by: Joel Levy Jr.
- Produced by: Lindsley Parsons
- Cinematography: Mack Stengler
- Edited by: William Austin
- Release date: 6 December 1944
- Running time: 68 minutes
- Country: United States
- Language: English

Army Wives is a 1944 American romantic comedy film directed by Phil Rosen.

== Cast ==
- Elyse Knox as Jerry Van Dyke
- Marjorie Rambeau as Mrs. Shannahan
- Rick Vallin as Barney
- Dorothea Kent as Louise
- Murray Alper as Mike
- Hardie Albright as Verne
- Kenneth Brown as Pat Shannahan
- Billy Lenhart as Billy Shannahan
- Eddie Dunn as Sgt. Shannahan
- Jimmy Conlin as Stan
- Ralph Sanford as Burke
- Dorothy Christy as Mrs. Lowry
- Phil Warren as Benson
- Ralph Lewis as Kirby

== See also ==
- List of American films of 1944
