= Sing a Jingle =

1944 film

- Directed by: Edward C. Lilley
- Written by: Eugene Conrad; John Grey; Fred Rath; Lee Sands
- Produced by: Edward C. Lilley
- Starring: Allan Jones; June Vincent; Samuel S. Hinds
- Cinematography: Jerome Ash
- Edited by: Charles Maynard
- Music by: Frank Skinner
- Production company: Universal Pictures
- Distributed by: Universal Pictures
- Release date: January 7, 1944
- Running time: 62 minutes
- Country: United States
- Language: English

Sing a Jingle is a 1944 American musical film directed by Edward C. Lilley and starring Allan Jones, June Vincent and Samuel S. Hinds.

== Partial cast ==
- Allan Jones as Ray King
- June Vincent as Muriel Crane
- Samuel S. Hinds as J.P. Crane
- Gus Schilling as Bucky
- Betty Kean as Myrtle
- Jerome Cowan as Andrews
- Edward Norris as Abbott
- Joan Castle as Vera Grant
- Dickie Love as Wilbur Crane
- Vivian Austin as Ann
- William Newell as Wiggins
- Dean Collins as Benny

== Bibliography ==
- John Russell Taylor & Arthur Jackson. The Hollywood Musical. McGraw-Hill Book Co., 1971.
