= My Gal Loves Music =

1944 film

- Theatrical release poster
- Directed by: Edward C. Lilley
- Screenplay by: Eugene Conrad; Edward Dein
- Story by: Patricia Harper
- Produced by: Edward C. Lilley
- Starring: Bob Crosby; Grace McDonald; Alan Mowbray; Betty Kean; Walter Catlett; Freddie Mercer
- Cinematography: Hal Mohr
- Edited by: Russell F. Schoengarth
- Production company: Universal Pictures
- Distributed by: Universal Pictures
- Release date: December 1, 1944
- Running time: 60 minutes
- Country: United States
- Language: English

My Gal Loves Music is a 1944 American comedy film directed by Edward C. Lilley and written by Eugene Conrad and Edward Dein. The film stars Bob Crosby, Grace McDonald, Alan Mowbray, Betty Kean, Walter Catlett and Freddie Mercer. The film was released on December 1, 1944, by Universal Pictures.

== Cast ==
- Bob Crosby as Mel Murray
- Grace McDonald as Judy Mason
- Alan Mowbray as Rodney Spoonyer
- Betty Kean as Peggy Quinn
- Walter Catlett as Dr. Bilbo
- Freddie Mercer as Clarence
- Paulina Carter as Child Pianist
- Tom Daly as Montague Underdunk
- Gayne Whitman as Announcer
- Chinita as Specialty
- Trixie as Specialty
