= The G-String Murders =

1941 novel by Gypsy Rose Lee

- First edition
- Author: Gypsy Rose Lee or possibly ghost-written by Craig Rice (authorship in dispute)
- Language: English
- Genre: Mystery, Detective Novel
- Publisher: Simon & Schuster
- Publication date: 1941
- Publication place: United States
- Media type: Print (Hardback & Paperback)

The G-String Murders is a 1941 detective novel written by American burlesque performer Gypsy Rose Lee. There have been claims made that the novel was written by mystery writer Craig Rice, but others have suggested that there is sufficient documented evidence in the form of manuscripts and correspondence to prove Lee wrote at least a large portion, if not the whole, of the novel under the tutelage of editor/friend George Davis with some essential guidance from her good friend Rice. The novel has been published under the titles Lady of Burlesque and The Strip-Tease Murders. Set in a burlesque theater, Lee casts herself as the detective who solves a set of homicides in which strippers in her troupe are found strangled with their own G-strings.

In 2005, Feminist Press of the City University of New York republished the book as one of its Women Write Pulp series.

== Plot summary ==
Gypsy Rose Lee narrates her way through a tale of a double murder, backstage at the "Old Opera" burlesque theatre on 42nd Street, New York City.

The story depicts a world populated by strippers, comics, and costume salesmen, where crime is part of the norm and where women struggle to earn a living.

The narrative is a "wise-cracking" and humorous tale of murder in a burlesque house, and with the unusual weapon of the title. Eventually, Gypsy discovers that an elderly male stagehand, Stachi, is the assailant, given that he was traumatised when he discovered that his grand-daughter, Lolita La Verne, was one of the performers. Fortunately, he is apprehended before he can kill Gypsy in his turn, due to a prearranged police trap in which she offered herself as 'bait.'

== Characters ==
- Gypsy Rose Lee, narrator
- Lolita La Verne, stripper
- Gee Gee Graham, stripper
- Biff Brannigan, comedian
- Siggy, costume salesman

== Literary significance and criticism ==
"Anyone keen about sex in fiction will admire this workmanlike job for its account of a performing group, its use of technicalities—if that's the word—about stripping, and its handling of the clues by a likeable lieutenant… This is one of a handful of books about backstage murder that are tolerable. It is not made worse by being told in the first person, or by a bit of sentimental lovey-dovey between the narratrix and one of the cast of characters."

== Adaptations ==
The novel was filmed in 1943 as Lady of Burlesque, directed by William Wellman, starring Barbara Stanwyck as Dixie Daisy (the Lee character), Michael O'Shea as her romantic interest, and Pinky Lee. It is a fairly faithful, if bowdlerized, representation, but notable for the addition of music and songs, including "Take It Off the E String, Play It on the G String", sung by Stanwyck. The film attempts to show what the censors of 1943 would allow with respect to the precise nature of "bumps" and "grinds" as well as the slapdash nature of burlesque shows.

== Sources ==
- Lee, Gypsy Rose. The G-String Murders. New York: Feminist Press of the City University of New York, 2005, ISBN 1-55861-504-0.
