= Violence (1947 film) =

1947 American drama film noir directed by Jack Bernhard

- Theatrical release poster
- Directed by: Jack Bernhard
- Written by: Louis Lantz; Stanley Rubin
- Produced by: Jack Bernhard; Bernard Brandt
- Starring: Nancy Coleman; Michael O'Shea; Sheldon Leonard
- Cinematography: Henry Sharp
- Edited by: Jason H. Bernie
- Music by: Edward J. Kay
- Production company: Bernhard-Brandt Productions
- Distributed by: Monogram Pictures
- Release date: May 12, 1947 (United States)
- Running time: 72 minutes
- Country: United States
- Language: English

Violence is a 1947 American drama film noir starring Nancy Coleman, Michael O'Shea, and Sheldon Leonard, and directed by Jack Bernhard.

== Plot ==
The film opens in the Los Angeles basement of the United Defenders (UD), a fascist organization for veterans. Fred Stalk and another goon are interrogating Joe Donahue, who wants to leave the group after discovering it is a scam. Stalk kills Donahue. UD leader True Dawson is just concluding a meeting. As attendees leave, UD secretary Ann Mason covertly photographs them with her watch.

Stalk privately tells Dawson that Donahue has been killed. Dawson expounds on their ruse to rile up veterans and bilk them with UD dues and Defender novelties. Dawson is confident he can make people angry enough to keep taking their money.

Ann is really an investigative reporter for a muckraking magazine in Chicago, working undercover in L.A. At her apartment she reads a letter from her editor suggesting she has enough material on the UD to return home and file her story. Claiming she is taking a personal trip to Chicago, she says farewell to her colleagues.

In Chicago, Ann is tailed by Steve Fuller from the UD. She urges her driver to lose him. He crashes the cab. Steve locates her in the hospital where she is unharmed but suffering from amnesia. He convinces her that they are engaged and takes her back to Los Angeles.

Remembering nothing, Ann resumes her work at the UD, even joining Dawson in one of his fundraising pitches. Sally Donahue looks for her husband at the UD. Steve finds some of the letters Sally wrote to Joe stashed in Stalk's room at the headquarters. He suspects the UD killed Donahue.

Ann reports Steve's allegations to Dawson, but the seeds of doubt grow in her. As she questions Stalk about Donahue, he slaps her, reviving her memory. She ends up in the basement tied to Steve, who reveals he is an undercover L.A. detective.

The UD is part of a network of anti-union strongarm activity. A shadowy overseer, Mr. X, instructs Dawson to rough up a group of veterans protesting for affordable housing. Dawson plans to use the resulting melee as a cover for murdering Ann and Steve.

They escape from the basement and warn the protesters of the trap. Anne and Steve force Dawson to take them to Stalk, who is now convinced that Dawson will pin the rap on him. The two men shoot each other. The UD is exposed, but the shadowy Mr. X behind it escapes detection and capture.

== Cast ==
- Nancy Coleman as Ann Dwyer, alias Ann Mason
- Michael O'Shea as Steve Fuller
- Sheldon Leonard as Fred Stalk
- Peter Whitney as Joker
- Emory Parnell as True Dawson
- Pierre Watkin as Ralph Borden
- Frank Reicher as Pop, apartment concierge/security/switchboard/elevator operator
- Cay Forrester as Sally Donahue
- John Hamilton as Doctor in Chicago
- Richard Irving as Protest Rally Orator
- Carole Donne as Beth Taffel, Borden's secretary
- Jimmy Clark as Joe Donahue
- William Gould as Mr. X

== Background ==
The Columbian Workers Movement was a neo-Nazi group based in Atlanta. A hatred of African-Americans, Jews, and $3 were the only requirements for entry. The group had national ambitions, and it was widely understood to be a front for the Ku Klux Klan. The Non-Sectarian Anti-Nazi League infiltrated the organization with several operatives, most notably Stetson Kennedy. One of the operatives was Renee Forrest who posed as a secretary for the Columbians. In December 1946, Jack Bernhard publicized a revision of the screenplay to emulate the Anti-Nazi League's sting.

Louis Lantz was a member of the U.S. Communist Party when he met future Violence co-screenwriter Stanley Rubin in 1941. He encouraged Rubin to attend some Communist discussions. After attending a few, Rubin realized they were diatribes instead of discussions, and he lost all interest. In 1953, six years after the film was made, the House Un-American Activities Committee interviewed Rubin about his attendance at Communist Party meetings in the early 1940s. Since they were still friends, Rubin asked Lantz to appear with him. Even though Lantz was no longer a Communist, he refused to participate in the Red Scare.

== Production ==
In July 1946, the Los Angeles Times reported that B&B Pictures bought the rights to John W. Stearn's novel Violence. Jack Bernhard planned on traveling to Chicago to talk with Stearn about the film and then on to New York to persuade Melville Cooper to star in it.

Later that year, the paper hailed the casting of Nancy Coleman as a welcome return to the screen after leaving Warner Bros. They also praised the "astuteness" of hiring Michael O'Shea. Walter Tetley was also reported to have joined the cast.

== Legacy ==
Violence was one of several noir films that dealt with veterans' issues after WWII, such as Crossfire and Boomerang!. The acute anxiety and proneness to manipulation of some returning GIs is exploited by Dawson who boasts, "We can make the vets behave any way we want...We'll prime them with hate...for labor...management...the party that's in...the party that's out." There was a general public fear about some returning soldiers being violent and a threat to social order. The screenplay also addresses the housing shortage that veterans faced after the war. One of the protestors argues, "We fought for our country...Give us a chance to live in it."

Leonard Maltin describes the film's material as "juicy" but "bungled by clumsy storytelling and some terrible performances".

Eddie Muller has shown Violence on Turner Classic Movies's Noir Alley.
