= It's a Pleasure (film) =

1945 film by William A. Seiter

It's a Pleasure!
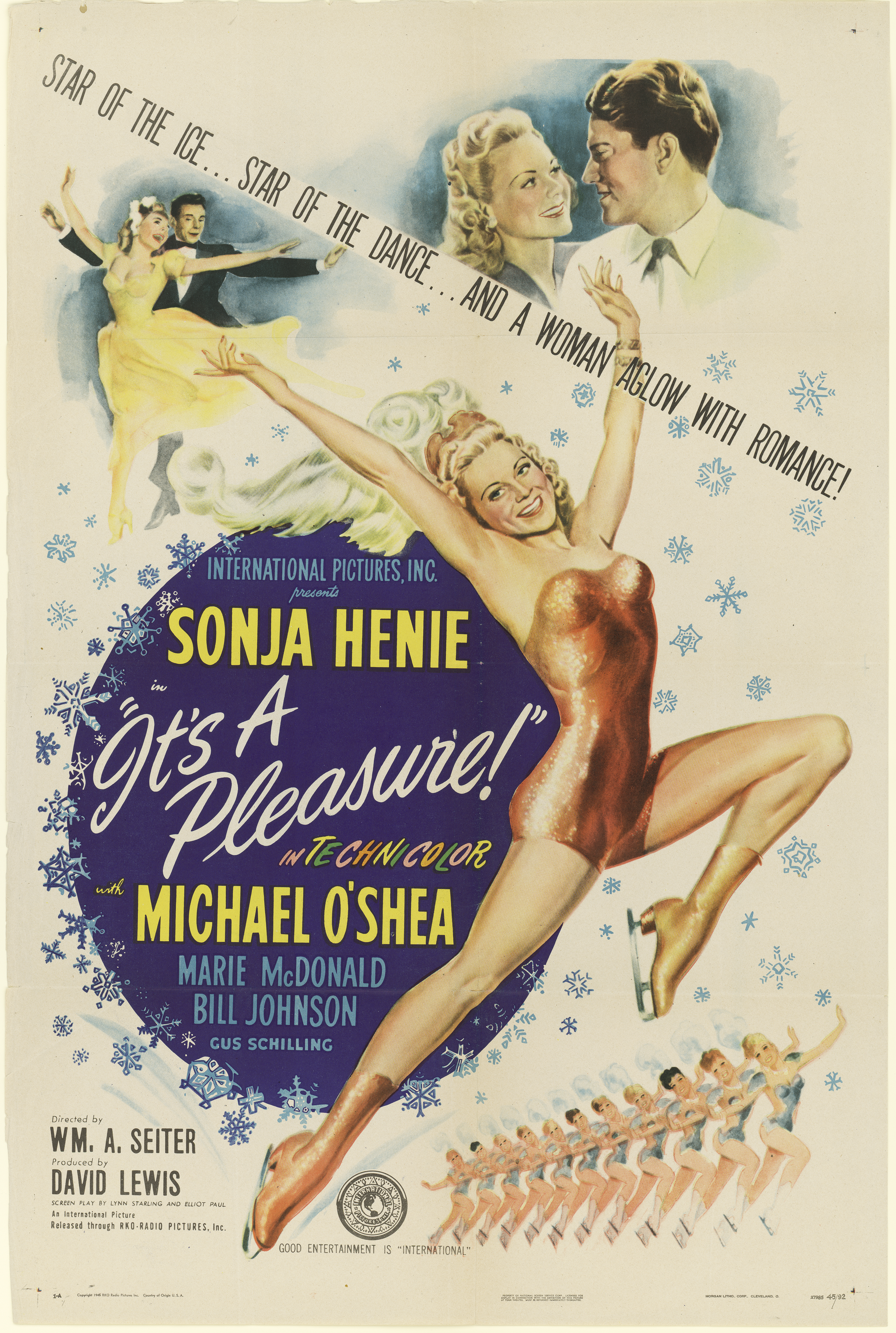
- Theatrical release poster
- Directed by: William A. Seiter
- Written by: Lynn Starling; Elliot Paul
- Produced by: David Lewis
- Starring: Sonja Henie; Michael O'Shea
- Cinematography: Ray Rennahan
- Edited by: Ernest Nims
- Production company: International Pictures
- Distributed by: RKO Radio Pictures
- Release date: March 3, 1945 (U.S.)
- Running time: 90 minutes
- Country: United States
- Language: English

It's a Pleasure! is a 1945 American Technicolor Comedy-drama musical film directed by William A. Seiter and starring Sonja Henie, Michael O'Shea and Marie McDonald.

== Plot ==
Don Martin's career in ice hockey screeches to a halt when he punches a referee. Banned from the sport for life, he is consoled by Chris Linden, a lovely skater who performs for the crowd during the hockey games' intermissions.

Chris has a crush on Don and introduces him to Buzz Fletcher, who runs an ice-skating revue. Don joins the show as a performer and marries Chris, but has a drinking problem. Buzz's bored wife Gail develops a romantic interest in Don and is furious when he resists. She gets him drunk and ruins his opportunity to perform a solo in the show.

Complications arise and result in Chris leaving her husband and going away for two years on tour with the show. Gail's guilty conscience gets the better of her and she reunites Chris and Don in the end.

== Cast ==
- Sonja Henie as Chris Linden
- Michael O'Shea as Don Martin
- Marie McDonald as Gail Fletcher
- Bill Johnson as Buzz 'Buzzard' Fletcher
- Gus Schilling as Bill Evans
- Iris Adrian as Wilma
- Cheryl Walker as Loni
- Peggy O'Neill as Cricket
- Arthur Loft as Jack Weimar
- David Janssen as Davey / boy referee (uncredited)

== Production ==
Sonja Henie had made nine pictures for 20th Century Fox ending with Wintertime. In December 1943 she signed a contract to make a movie for the newly formed International Pictures which was run by William Goetz who had been head of production at Fox briefly while Henie worked there. The film was to be part of International's initial slate of four pictures costing $5 million being distributed by RKO, the others being Casanova Brown, Belle of the Yukon and Once Off Guard.

According to producer David Lewis, Goetz had no story for Henie and asked Lewis if he had anything. Lewis lunched with Charles Brackett when Billy Wilder came in and Lewis asked Wilder if he had any ideas. Lewis wrote Wilder "came up with the title Of Ice And Woman and proceeded to sit down and dictate a few pages, a total takeoff on the play Burlesque. Although it was all done as sort of a lark, the idea had merit, and I took it to Goetz. He liked it (or was grasping at straws) and called Wilder, who offered it as a gift."

Geotz asked Lewis to produce the film but David Loper was associate producer. Lewis said "with Goetz’s backing, Loper tried to take over. He had no story judgment and was only interested, as was [Mitchell] Leisen, in decor. The film could have no pretensions with Henie and Michael O'Shea (a talented actor but out of place), but I hoped to get a coherent background for Henie’s skating skills, most of which had been expertly exploited in her Twentieth Century- Fox films. Since she had to dominate the film, and, as our only skater, was limited in her choreography, all we had to offer was a Technicolor view of her."

Bill Johnson had been in Something for the Boys and was borrowed from MGM; it was his screen debut.

International leased two ice skating rinks, at Westwood Ice Garden and the Polar Palace in Hollywood. Filming started August 1, 1944.

Michael O'Shea was cast in August 1944, borrowed from Hunt Stromberg. In late August Hedda Hopper announced that Henie was refusing to talk to producer David Lewis and was only talking to designer Don Loper.

In November 1944 International announced they would make a second film with Henie, The Countess of Monte Cristo. It was not made until several years later, at Universal International.

Lewis wrote that Seiter "one of the sweetest and most patient directors I have ever worked with, kept things moving, and Lynn Starling contributed fresh dialogue to Elliot Paul’s rather heavy-handed script."

== Reception ==
The New York Times called it a "flaccid fable."

Lewis said the film "was, as expected, mediocre, but the film showed a profit. Goetz nonetheless abandoned further commitments with Henie, everyone agreeing that audiences were no longer excited about her and her icy antics."

== Notes ==
- Lewis, David (1993). Curtis, James (ed.). The Creative Producer. Metuchen: Scarecrow Press. ISBN 0-8108-2720-4.
