= The Court of Missing Heirs =

American old-time radio human interest drama

- Other names: The Board of Missing Heirs; Are You a Missing Heir?
- Genre: Human interest drama
- Country of origin: United States
- Language: English
- Home station: WBBM
- Syndicates: ABC; CBS
- Written by: Ira Marion
- Directed by: John Loveton; Charles Harrell; Rodney Erickson
- Produced by: Wilson Meade; Alfred Shebel
- Narrated by: James Marshall
- Original release: October 11, 1937 – April 6, 1947
- Sponsored by: Sterling Products

The Court of Missing Heirs is an American old-time radio human interest drama. It was broadcast on CBS October 11, 1937 – September 29, 1942, and on ABC March 31, 1946 – April 6, 1947. It also went by the titles The Board of Missing Heirs and Are You a Missing Heir?.

== Format ==
Each episode of The Court of Missing Heirs featured two dramatizations of real-life situations involving people who died leaving estates that had been unclaimed.

After having handled probate cases that involved unclaimed estates, attorney James Waters originally planned to use the concept of finding missing heirs in a book. When publishing companies rejected his manuscript, he adapted the idea to radio. Waters and Alfred Shebel used actual court records to conduct the research for each episode. In 1942, the program reached the $1 million mark in helping people collect legacies that had been unclaimed.

The program originated at WBBM in Chicago, Illinois, and was sponsored by Sterling Products.

== Personnel ==
The program had no continuing characters. Actors frequently heard on it included Walter Kinsella, Kenny Delmar, Jeanette Nolan, Everett Sloane, and Carl Frank. The narrator was James Marshall.

Everard Wilson Meade and Alfred Shebel were producers. Directors were John Loveton, Charles Harrell, and Rodney Erickson. Ira Marion was the writer, and Rosa Rio provided the music.

== Selected cases resolved by the program ==
- 1936 - A nephew of Michael Cusack, who died in Chicago, was located in regard to an approximately $6,000 estate.
- 1940 - Mrs. Myrtle Garvey Juranics received $4,000 from the unclaimed estate of her husband.
- 1941 - The son and daughter of Joseph J. Hoagland received approximately $4,500 after his death.

== References in popular culture ==
Producer and director Tim Whelan based the RKO film Seven Days' Leave (1942) on an episode of The Court of Missing Heirs that he heard. The film included scenes of a broadcast of the program.

Joseph Spalding's 1942 play Spider Island features a character, Star Mayo, who learns from The Court of Missing Heirs program that she has inherited Spider Island and wants to claim her property.

== Legal action ==
In 1943, producers Waters and Shebel sued Herbert and Dorothy Fields, writers of the play Something for the Boys, charging plagiarism. An article in the May 8, 1943, issue of Billboard reported that Walters and Shebel "allege that the idea of the show starring Ethel Merman was stolen from their program." 20th Century Fox, which produced a film version of the play and had "a financial interest in the show", was also a defendant.
