= Michael O'Shea (actor) =

American actor (1906–1973)

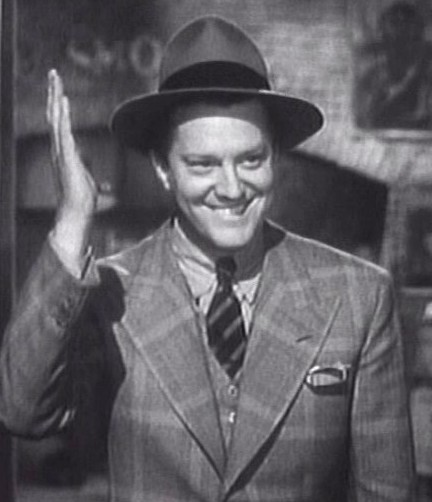
- O'Shea in Lady of Burlesque (1943)
- Born: Edward Francis Michael Patrick Joseph O'Shea; March 17, 1906; Hartford, Connecticut, U.S.
- Died: December 4, 1973 (aged 67); Dallas, Texas, U.S.
- Occupation: Actor
- Years active: 1930s–1971
- Spouse(s): Grace Watts (m. 1927; div. 1947) Virginia Mayo (m. 1947)
- Children: 3

Edward Francis Michael Patrick Joseph O'Shea (March 17, 1906 – December 4, 1973) was an American actor, comedian, musician and band leader who appeared on the stage, in feature films and on television in a career that spanned the 1940s through the early 1970s.

== Early life ==
O'Shea was born in Hartford, Connecticut on March 17, 1906. He held jobs as a newspaper copy boy, a Western Union messenger and a tobacco farmer before embarking on his career in showbusiness.

== Career ==
O'Shea played drums and the banjo. Much like his character from Lady of Burlesque (1943), Biff Brannigan, O'Shea acted as a comedian and emcee at speakeasies. He assembled a dance band, Michael O'Shea and His Stationary Gypsies, and later performed on radio and the legitimate stage, where he was billed for a time as Eddie O'Shea. He worked on radio shows such as Superman, Mr District Attorney, The March of Time and Gangbuster.

O'Shea received acclaim for his performance in the 1942 play The Eve of St. Mark on Broadway. The play was a hit and film producers began approaching O'Shea with offers for screen tests.

=== Early films ===
O'Shea's work in The Eve of St. Mark led to an offer to play Barbara Stanwyck's leading man in the film Lady of Burlesque (1943) for producer Hunt Stromberg, released through United Artists, which became a sizeable hit.

Samuel Bronston offered O'Shea the title role in the biopic Jack London (1943), also released through United Artists. The cast included Virginia Mayo, who would become O'Shea's second wife.

O'Shea was asked to reprise his stage role in the film version of The Eve of St. Mark (1944), produced by Twentieth-Century Fox, with whom he had contracted for two more films, including Where Do We Go From Here?, a project that did not materialize.

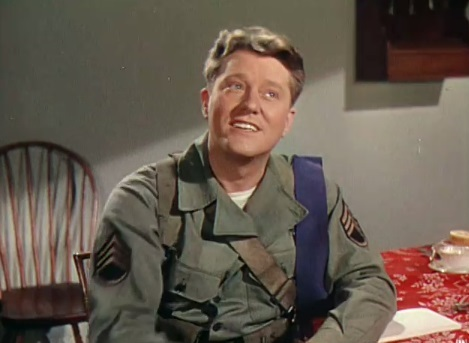
O'Shea in Something for the Boys (1944)

O'Shea played the lead role in Man from Frisco (1944), a fictional account of the career of Henry Kaiser for Republic Pictures and directed by Robert Florey. At Fox he appeared in the musical Something for the Boys (1944) with Carmen Miranda.

O'Shea next starred in the International Pictures feature It's a Pleasure! (1945), playing a hockey star who marries figure skater Sonja Henie. Back at Fox, he played the lead in Circumstantial Evidence (1945).

=== Return to Broadway ===
O'Shea returned to Broadway with a role in the revival of The Red Mill (1945–47), produced by Hunt Stromberg Jr. which ran for 531 performances.

=== Supporting actor in film ===
Following the run of The Red Mill, O'Shea returned to films with a supporting part in Mr. District Attorney (1947) for Columbia.

O'Shea was Nancy Coleman's leading man in Violence (1947) for Monogram Pictures and played Natty Bumppo in Last of the Redmen (1947) for Columbia. He played a supporting role in Smart Woman (1948) and the lead in Parole, Inc. (1949).

O'Shea supported Mickey Rooney in The Big Wheel (1949) at United Artists and played the lead in The Threat (1949) for RKO.

He supported John Payne in Captain China (1950) and Dan Duryea in The Underworld Story (1950). He had a support role in Disc Jockey (1951) before appearing in three films for Twentieth Century-Fox: Fixed Bayonets (1951) for Sam Fuller, The Model and the Marriage Broker (1951) for George Cukor and Bloodhounds of Broadway (1952).

=== Television ===
After O'Shea's career in film waned, he took many roles in television, appearing in programs such as The Revlon Mirror Theater, Ethel Barrymore Theatre, Damon Runyon Theater, Adam-12, and Schlitz Playhouse of Stars.

O'Shea had a supporting part in It Should Happen to You (1954).

=== It's a Great Life ===
O'Shea starred in the NBC sitcom It's a Great Life from 1954 to 1956 as Denny Davis, a former GI trying to find a civilian job. He was nominated for an Emmy Award in 1955.

O'Shea worked as a panelist on TV shows and in 1960 filmed a pilot for a TV sitcom with his wife Virginia Mayo, McGarry and His Mouse, but it was not sold as a series. He guest-starred on episodes of Adventures in Paradise, Daktari and Adam-12. In 1964, O'Shea returned briefly to New York stage in the production of I Was Dancing.

== Personal life ==
O'Shea was married twice, first to Grace Watts, by whom he had two children. They were divorced in 1947.

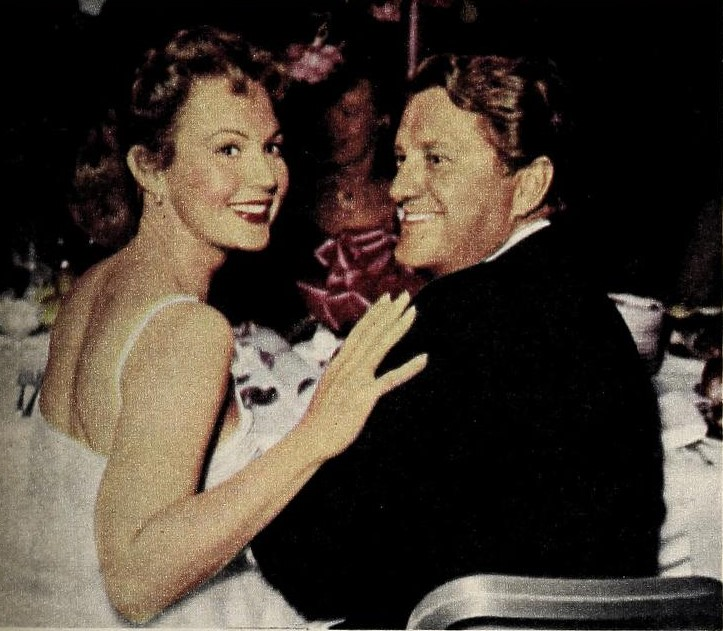
O'Shea with his wife Virginia Mayo (1955)

O'Shea next wed actress Virginia Mayo, in 1947, whom he had met while filming Jack London in 1943. They subsequently appeared on the stock stage together in productions such as George Washington Slept Here, Tunnel of Love and Fiorello!. The couple had one child, Mary Catherine O'Shea, born in 1953. That year, O'Shea's first wife sued him for unpaid alimony.

In 1957, O'Shea pleaded guilty to discharging a firearm after firing two shots into a tractor tire because boys had "hot-rodded" it near his home. In August 1959, he was arrested after brandishing a pistol in a Philadelphia restaurant following an argument between his wife and another customer over the air conditioning.

O'Shea kept his bricklayer's union card and was a reserve deputy sheriff in the Ventura County Sheriff's Office.

He died of a heart attack in Dallas in 1973 just before embarking on tour with Mayo in a production of Forty Carats.

== Partial filmography ==
- Lady of Burlesque (1943)
- Jack London (1943)
- Something for the Boys (1944)
- Man from Frisco (1944) – Matt Braddock
- The Eve of St Mark (1944)
- Circumstantial Evidence (1945)
- It's a Pleasure (1945)
- Last of the Redmen (1947)
- Violence (1947)
- Mr. District Attorney (1947)
- Parole, Inc. (1948)
- Smart Woman (1948)
- The Threat (1949)
- The Big Wheel (1949)
- The Underworld Story (1950)
- Captain China (1950)
- The Model and the Marriage Broker (1951)
- Fixed Bayonets! (1951)
- Disc Jockey (1951)
- Bloodhounds of Broadway (1952)
- It Should Happen to You (1954)
