= Edge of Darkness (1943 film) =

1943 film by Lewis Milestone

- Theatrical release poster
- Directed by: Lewis Milestone
- Screenplay by: Robert Rossen
- Based on: The Edge of Darkness; 1942 novel by William Woods
- Produced by: Henry Blanke
- Starring: Errol Flynn; Ann Sheridan; Walter Huston; Nancy Coleman
- Cinematography: Sid Hickox
- Edited by: David Weisbart
- Music by: Franz Waxman
- Production company: Warner Bros. Pictures
- Distributed by: Warner Bros. Pictures
- Release dates: April 9, 1943 (premiere-New York City); April 24, 1943 (United States)
- Running time: 119 minutes
- Country: United States
- Language: English
- Budget: $1,653,000
- Box office: $3,669,000 $2.3 million (US rentals)

Edge of Darkness (a.k.a. Norway in Revolt) is a 1943 World War II film directed by Lewis Milestone that features Errol Flynn, Ann Sheridan, and Walter Huston. The feature is based on a script written by Robert Rossen which was adapted from the 1942 novel The Edge of Darkness by William Woods.

== Plot ==
Norway, 1942. In the Nazi-occupied fishing village of Trollness, Dr. Martin Stensgard and his wife hold on to the pretense of gracious living and ignore the occupiers. The doctor would also prefer to stay neutral, but is torn. Kaspar Torgersen, his brother-in-law, the wealthy owner of the local fish cannery, collaborates with the Nazis. However, the doctor's daughter, Karen, is a resistance member, romantically involved with its leader, Gunnar Brogge. Complicating matters further, the doctor's son, Johann, has just returned from school in Oslo. Unfortunately, he comes under the influence of his Nazi-sympathizer uncle. Though she loves her brother, Karen makes it known to the townsfolk that Johann is a Quisling.

A key group of resistance members, headed by Gunnar and Karen, anxiously await a secret arrival of arms from a British submarine. They hide the weapons in a cellar and call upon the townsfolk to delay violence until the opportune moment. One evening, Karen, on her way to a meeting, is grabbed by a German soldier and disappears, while Gunnar frantically searches the town for her. She eventually appears at the meeting, clothes torn and face bruised, indicative that she has been raped. Gunnar loses his perspective after seeing what the Germans have done and prepares to attack without delay. But Karen and the others convince him that it is still not yet the time.

After the meeting, Karen's father, in anger, murders a German soldier. The Nazi commandant orders all suspected resistance leaders held for public execution. The next morning, they dig their own graves in the town square. Then, they hear singing and discover the townsfolk have armed themselves with the smuggled arsenal. The local pastor fires a machine gun from the church tower, and the townsfolk follow suit. They re-capture their village and load the women and children onto fishing boats bound for England. At the local hotel, which serves as German headquarters, and where Karen's brother has moved, preparations are made for defense. Gunnar, Karen, her father, and other resistance members march through the forest toward the hotel. Johann, experiencing a change of heart, warns the rebels from the hotel they are walking into a crossfire trap. The Germans kill Johann, then engage in battle with the rebels, who finally seize the hotel. The Nazi commandant commits suicide. Later, surviving resistance members take to the hills to continue their fight against occupation.

== Cast ==
- Errol Flynn as Gunnar Brogge
- Ann Sheridan as Karen Stensgard
- Walter Huston as Dr. Martin Stensgard
- Helmut Dantine as Captain Koenig
- Ruth Gordon as Anna Stensgard
- Judith Anderson as Gerd Bjarnesen
- Roman Bohnen as Lars Malken
- Monte Blue as Jens Peterson
- Tom Fadden as Hammer (uncredited)
- Francis Pierlot as Old Man Mortenson
- Art Smith as Knut
- Richard Fraser as Pastor Aalesen
- Morris Carnovsky as Sixtus Andresen
- Charles Dingle as Kaspar Torgersen
- Nancy Coleman as Katja, Koenig's Polish mistress
- John Beal as Johann Stensgard
- Kurt Katch as German Landing Party Captain
- Henry Brandon as Major Ruck

== Production ==
=== Original Novel ===
Edge of Darkness was based on the debut novel of William Woods. Warner Bros. Pictures bought the film rights in January 1942 for $30,000. The novel was published on April 9, the second anniversary of the German invasion of Norway.

=== Development ===
Henry Blanke was assigned to produce, Robert Rossen to write the script and Lewis Milestone to direct. Milestone later told the press:

It is twelve years now since I made All Quiet on the Western Front. That film embodied the retrospective disillusionment toward another war. In Edge of Darkness we are making a picture that has done away with disillusionment. We know the enemy we are fighting and we are facing the stern realities of the present war. The moral in Edge of Darkness is that 'united we stand, divided we fall'. That is the keystone for victory in all the democracies.

"I can't think of a story about which I could be more enthusiastic," said Blanke about Edge of Darkness.

The job of writing the script was given to Robert Rossen. Milestone later said Rossen "hit on an idiom for the dialogue that had nothing to do with Norway but derived mainly from the language he knew best - the speechways of New York's East Side. Since nobody else knew the difference the idiom worked admirably."

=== Casting ===
Ann Sheridan and Humphrey Bogart were announced as stars.

Eventually Bogart dropped out and was replaced by Errol Flynn.

The cast included Helmut Dantine who had just signed a long-term contract with Warners following his appearance in Casablanca.

There were a large number of actors cast who were best known for their stage work, including Judith Anderson and Ruth Gordon.

Milestone later said "an extremely mixed cast gave some damned good performances."

=== Shooting ===
Shooting was to begin in August 1942 but was postponed for two weeks so Errol Flynn could recuperate from bad health. He was meant to do this on his yacht but Hedda Hopper reported he slipped down to Mexico City with a friend for some hunting, and that he "hasn't wanted to do it [the film] from the first", in part because his role was relatively small. Bruce Cabot was listed as a possible replacement if Flynn did not return. Warners pressured Flynn and he eventually returned for filming.

(It was later reported that Flynn had signed a new contract with Warners for four films a year, in one of which he was to also act as producer.)

Most of the film was shot at Warner Bros. Studios Burbank with some exteriors in the town of Monterey. Warners rented two of the biggest piers in Monterey and a fleet of Monterey sailing boats; they lined the streets with Norwegian and Nazi flags and signs and cast several locals as extras. The unit returned from Monterey on September 16 to resume studio shooting.

Erskine Caldwell reportedly operated as a technical adviser on the film because he had some experience of Norway.

During filming, Warners added six grave markers with the names of Nazi saboteurs recently executed in the US, for extra realism. Filming ended in November.

Edge of Darkness was one of several films set in occupied Europe, others being Commandos Strike at Dawn and The Moon is Down.

Milestone later said "Flynn kept underrating himself. If you wanted to embarrass him, all you had to do was to tell him how great he was in a scene he'd just finished playing: he'd blush like a young girl and muttering 'I'm not an actor' would go away somewhere and sit down."

=== Music ===
Franz Waxman did the score. He used two main pieces, the Lutheran chorale "A Mighty Fortress is Our God" and the national hymn of Norway. According to one review, "the rest is frankly color orchestration and the necessary filling in. The result is a magnificent build up to an overwhelming emotional climax."

== Reception ==
Contemporary reviews were positive. Bosley Crowther of The New York Times called the film "melodrama [but] strong melodrama, to be sure." Variety described it as "a dramatic, tense, emotion-stirring story of the ravaging of Norway, superbly acted by a fine cast and firmly directed by Lewis Milestone." Harrison's Reports called it "Excellent! ... Lewis Milestone's direction is masterful, and the performances, from the stars to the bit players, are superb." David Lardner of The New Yorker compared the film to The Moon Is Down, writing that both were worth seeing but that Edge of Darkness was slightly better due to rounder characterizations. Filmink magazine called it "definitely Errol's most communist (ish) movie."

The film was one of the five most requested movies by the US Army in April 1943 - the others being My Friend Flicka, Hit Parade of 1943, Flight for Freedom and Hello, Frisco, Hello. The Sons of Norway organization also arranged special screenings of the film.

After the 1943 Argentine Revolution, the pro-Nazi Vice-president Juan Perón banned Edge of Darkness in Buenos Aires because of its sympathetic portrayal of the Norwegian resistance movement and the unambiguously evil characterization of the Nazi occupiers.

Flynn was to follow the movie with To the Last Man (which became Northern Pursuit) and Captain Horatio Hornblower (which was postponed and then made with Gregory Peck).

=== Box Office ===
According to Warner Bros. records, the film earned $2,039,000 within the U.S. ($37.9 million in 2025) and $1,630,000 ($30.3 million in 2025) abroad.
