= The Underworld Story =

1950 film by Cy Endfield

- Theatrical release poster
- Directed by: Cy Endfield
- Screenplay by: Henry Blankfort; Adaptation: Cy Endfield
- Story by: Craig Rice
- Produced by: Hal E. Chester
- Starring: Dan Duryea; Herbert Marshall; Gale Storm; Howard Da Silva; Michael O'Shea
- Cinematography: Stanley Cortez
- Edited by: Richard V. Heermance
- Music by: David Rose
- Production company: FilmCraft Productions
- Distributed by: United Artists
- Release date: July 26, 1950 (United States)
- Running time: 91 minutes
- Country: United States
- Language: English

The Underworld Story is a 1950 American film noir crime film directed by Cy Endfield and starring Dan Duryea, Herbert Marshall, Gale Storm, with Howard Da Silva and Michael O'Shea in support. Da Silva plays the loud-mouthed gangster Carl Durham, one of his last roles before becoming blacklisted.

The newspaperman played by Duryea is similar in tone (a reporter that does anything for publicity for himself regardless of ethics) to Kirk Douglas in Billy Wilder's Ace in the Hole (1951). This B-movie was shot in black and white by director Cy Endfield and cinematographer Stanley Cortez.

== Plot ==
When big-city newspaper reporter Mike Reese writes and publishes a story (after breaking his promise to withhold it) that results in the murder of a state's witness against a local mobster, he loses his job. He soon finds that no one else will hire him, so he extracts money from the mobster (who is actually grateful for the story Reese published), moves to small-town Lakeville, and buys a half-interest in the newspaper, The Lakeville Sentinel. The newspaper is owned by Catherine Harris, who immediately has differences with Reese on how things should operate. Reese, trying to use the paper as a step up, latches onto a murder of a woman who happens to be the daughter-in-law of a newspaper magnate, his former employer. When a local black woman is suspected (revealed to the audience early as a scapegoat), Reese turns the story into a media circus, and soon his reporting is back in the spotlight again. Eventually, he finds himself having to decide if he will reform his opportunistic ways.

== Cast ==
- Dan Duryea as Mike Reese
- Herbert Marshall as E.J. Stanton
- Gale Storm as Catherine Harris
- Howard Da Silva as Carl Durham
- Michael O'Shea as District Attorney Ralph Munsey
- Mary Anderson as Molly Rankin
- Gar Moore as Clark Stanton
- Melville Cooper as Maj. Redford
- Frieda Inescort as Mrs. Eldridge
- Art Baker as Lt. Tilton
- Harry Shannon as George "Parky" Parker
- Alan Hale Jr. as Shaeffer
- Stephen Dunne as Chuck Lee
- Roland Winters as Stanley Becker
- Sue England as Helen
- Lewis L. Russell as Calvin
- Frances Chaney as Grace

== Production ==
The film was known as The Whip.

== Reception ==
=== Critical response ===
The New York Times film critic, Bosley Crowther, panned the film. He wrote, "It is so poorly made, so haphazard and so full of detectable holes that it carries no impact or conviction, regardless of credibility. Mr. Chester and his associates are free to proclaim, if they wish, that newspaper men are no good. We think the same of his film."

Film historian and critic Glenn Erickson wrote in 2010 about the film's theme, "The Underworld Story plays like the work of angry men. The title isn't very appropriate, as the story doesn't center on gangsters. Its main focus is the misuse of the power of the press, with side excursions into racism, class arrogance and the influence of organized crime. As in Billy Wilder's Ace in the Hole, raw greed leads to gross injustice. Like Wilder's venal Chuck Tatum, the reporter in The Underworld Story thinks of little beyond the next fast buck. 'Times are tough all over,' says a cynical official. 'Pretty soon a man won't be able to sell his own mother.'"

== Adaption ==
- Avon Periodicals: The Underworld Story (1950)
