= Last of the Redskins =

1947 film by George Sherman

Last of the Redskins (a.k.a. Last of the Redmen)
- Directed by: George Sherman
- Screenplay by: Herbert Dalmas; George H. Plympton
- Based on: The Last of the Mohicans by James Fenimore Cooper
- Produced by: Sam Katzman
- Starring: Jon Hall; Michael O'Shea
- Cinematography: Ray Fernstrom; Ira H. Morgan
- Edited by: James Sweeney
- Color process: Cinecolor
- Production company: Sam Katzman Productions
- Distributed by: Columbia Pictures
- Release dates: July 10, 1947 (Los Angeles); August 1, 1947 (United States)
- Running time: 79 minutes
- Country: United States
- Language: English

Last of the Redskins also known as Last of the Redmen is a 1947 American Western film, directed by George Sherman and starring Joh Hall and Michael O'Shea. The film was shot in Vitacolor, but released in Cinecolor.

Unlike other adaptations, the film includes a boy brother of Cora and Alice Munro and does not feature Chingachgook, nor does it feature a romance between Uncas and Cora. The battle of Fort William Henry is not shown and most of the characters in the film ride horses rather than moving by foot.

It was the first of several collaborations between Jon Hall and Sam Katzman.

== Plot ==
During the French and Indian War, in 1757, the family of Colonel Munro, daughters Alice and Cora and son Davy come from England to visit their father, who is commanding Fort William Henry in the American colonies. The French are masters of the military intelligence situation, as they have their loyal Indian allies masquerading as scouts for the English and are able to intercept and kill all runners from the British outposts.

General Webb, the commander of Fort Edward where the Munros have arrived, has fallen for French ruses, by believing that General Montcalm's French and Indian forces are advancing from the South. General Webb's Indian Scout Magua testifies to the truth of this information, convincing General Webb to send his forces South and send the Munro family to the believed safety of their father, General Munro, to the north, at Fort William Henry. The only person who does not believe Magua is the Colonial Scout Hawkeye and his Indian companion, Uncas. Hawkeye's rough ways, honesty and vocal common sense has alienated him from the British military command.

In reality, Magua was once flogged by General Munro for being drunk and sees the chance to torture and murder the Munro children as a pinnacle of revenge. Leading the Munros, accompanied by Major Duncan, Heyward and a small British military escort into an Iroquois ambush; Magua is thwarted by the arrival of Hawkeye and Uncas, who rescue the Major and the Munros. The Major wins Hawkeye over by declaring that he would be placing his pride over the lives of the party if he didn't give command of the evasion party to the experienced Hawkeye. The group manages to evade Magua's pursuing Indians for a brief period, but Hawkeye arranges for a better chance for escape by having Heyward and the Munros captured, then rescued by Hawkeye and Uncas.

On their escape from the camp, the party runs across the garrison of Fort William Henry who declare that they gave an honourable surrender of the fort to the French and were allowed to keep their arms, but not their ammunition. Hawkeye suspects the Indians will massacre the party and organises a defence.

== Cast ==
- Jon Hall as Major Duncan Heyward
- Michael O'Shea as Hawk Eye / Natty Bumpo
- Evelyn Ankers as Alice Munro
- Julie Bishop as Cora Munro
- Buster Crabbe as Magua
- Rick Vallin as Uncas
- Buzz Henry as Davy Munro

== Production ==
The film was announced in June 1946. It marked producer Sam Katzman's first feature at Columbia, although he had been making serials for them. He borrowed Jon Hall from Sam Goldwyn.

Julie Bishop was signed in August 1946. That month George Sherman was attached to direct.

== Reception ==
The New York Times said "go to it, kids, and squirm with excitement the way we once used to do, on Saturday afternoon. And don't be too harsh on the actors – they are really nice people, trying hard to make a living."

== See also ==
- List of American films of 1947
