= Something for the Boys (film) =

1944 film by Lewis Seiler

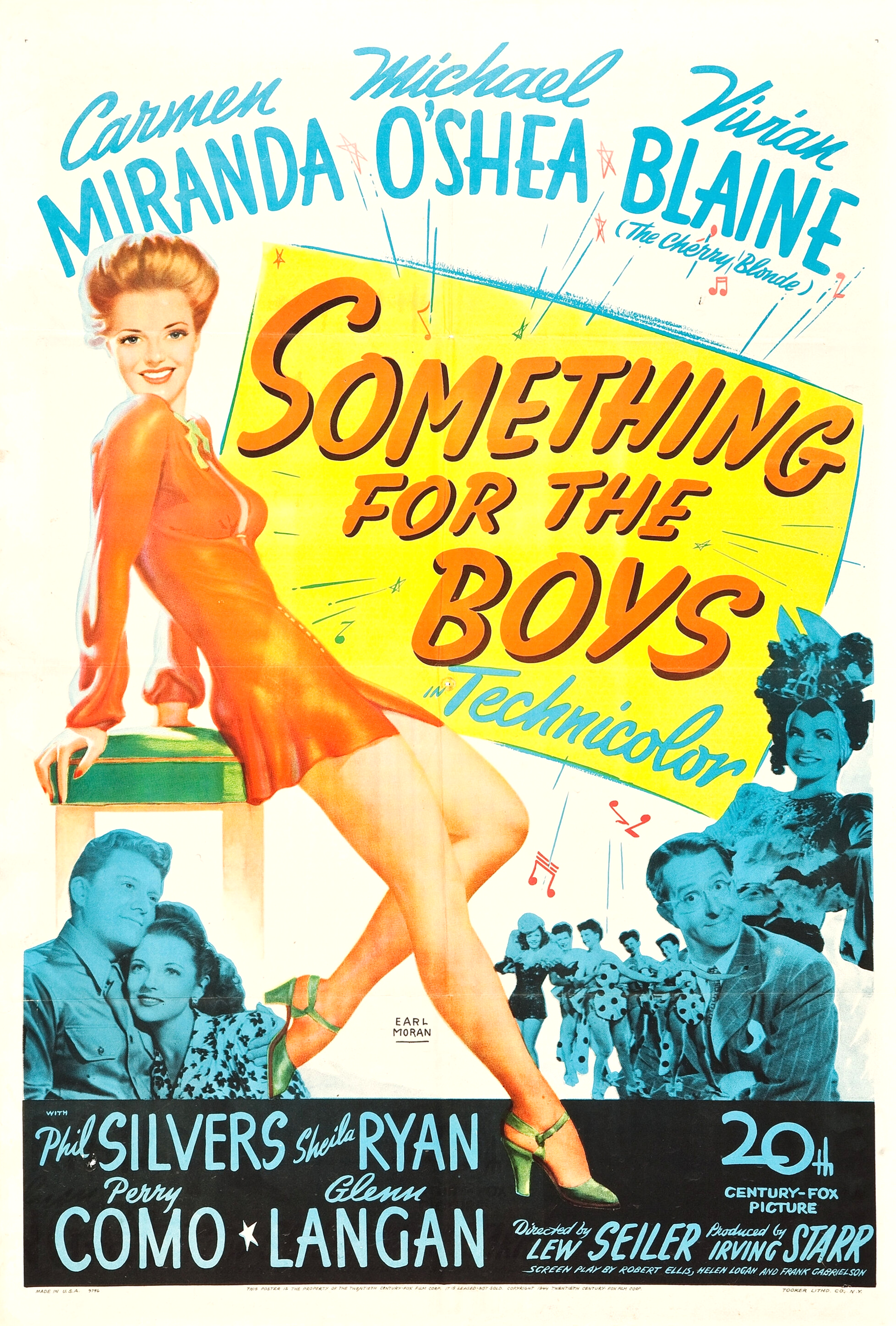
- Theatrical release poster
- Directed by: Lewis Seiler
- Screenplay by: Robert Ellis; Helen Logan; Frank Gabrielson
- Based on: Something for the Boys by Herbert Fields; Dorothy Fields; Cole Porter
- Produced by: Irving Starr
- Starring: Carmen Miranda; Michael O'Shea; Vivian Blaine; Phil Silvers; Sheila Ryan; Perry Como; Glenn Langan
- Cinematography: Ernest Palmer
- Edited by: Robert Simpson
- Music by: Leigh Harline; Cyril J. Mockridge
- Production company: Twentieth Century-Fox
- Distributed by: Twentieth Century-Fox
- Release date: November 1, 1944
- Running time: 87 minutes
- Country: United States
- Language: English
- Box office: $1,250,000

Something for the Boys is a 1944 American musical comedy film directed by Lewis Seiler. It stars Carmen Miranda, Michael O'Shea, Vivian Blaine, Phil Silvers, Sheila Ryan, Perry Como, and Glenn Langan.

The screenplay, based on the 1943 Broadway musical with songs by Cole Porter, follows three cousins who, during World War II, inherit a mansion. Chiquita Hart (Miranda), Harry (Silvers), and Blossom (Blaine) decide to turn the place into a guesthouse for military wives, combining service with artistic performances.

Actress Judy Holliday, who would go on to win an Academy Award for Best Actress six years later for Born Yesterday (1950), makes a brief appearance with just one line of dialogue.

== Plot ==
Cousins actress Blossom Hart, defense plant worker Chiquita Hart, and inventor Harry Hart learn that they are heirs to a large plantation in Masonville, Georgia. As they are all poor, they are thrilled by the inheritance, but when lawyer Jefferson Calhoun takes them to Magnolia Manor, they discover that the formerly glorious plantation house is now in ruins. They also learn that paying the plantation's property and inheritance taxes will place them deeply in debt.

Staff Sgt. Ronald "Rocky" Fulton, a well-known orchestra leader before joining the military, arrives with some of his men, including Sgt. Laddie Green. Fulton explains that the married servicemen of nearby Camp Dixon want to rent rooms in the manor for their wives. The men help the cousins restore the manor. Fulton, who has begun a romance with Blossom, suggests that they stage a musical show to raise funds for the renovations. On the day that the show is to open, Blossom is stunned by the arrival of Melanie Walker, a snobbish, rich woman whom Fulton is forced to admit is his fiancée. When Melanie announces the changes that she intends to make to the manor, Blossom is infuriated and refuses to speak to Fulton, but he tells Chiquita that he loves only Blossom.

The show is a great success, and the next morning, Chiquita advises Blossom to fight for Fulton if she loves him. Lt. Ashley Crothers visits and discovers that Harry is hosting a dice game for the soldiers, none of whom have wives staying at the manor. Crothers arrests the soldiers and recommends that the house be restricted for all military personnel. Col. Grubbs approves Crothers' suggestion, and soon the wives are packing to leave.

After Harry learns that carborundum from the defense plant is causing Chiquita's dental fillings to receive radio programs, he decides to build an invention around the idea. One afternoon, Fulton visits to talk to Blossom, who refuses to see him. He is supposed to be on duty for war games and is captured by the enemy army, which has taken the manor as its headquarters. Fulton enlists the aid of Chiquita and Harry, who build a transmitter to send a message to his unit through Chiquita's teeth. The message is sent and the cousins distract the enemy army with a song-and-dance show while Fulton's army assembles for its attack. His side prevails in the maneuvers, and in appreciation of the help offered by Blossom, Chiquita, and Harry, the manor is reopened for the military men and their wives. At a celebratory party, Fulton announces that he has been selected for officer candidate school and Blossom reconciles with him.

== Cast ==
- Carmen Miranda as Chiquita Hart
- Michael O'Shea as Sergeant Ronald 'Rocky' Fulton
- Vivian Blaine as Blossom Hart
- Phil Silvers as Harry Hart
- Sheila Ryan as Melanie Walker
- Perry Como as Sergeant Laddie Green
- Glenn Langan as Lieutenant Ashley Crothers
- Thurston Hall as Colonel Jefferson L. Calhoun
- June Haver as Chorine
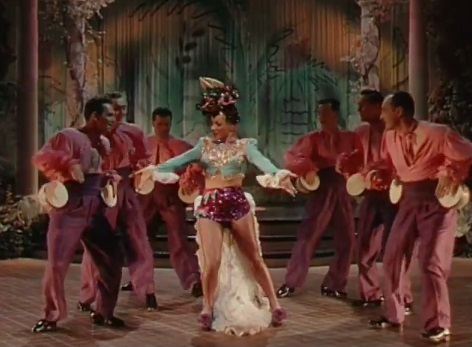
Carmen Miranda

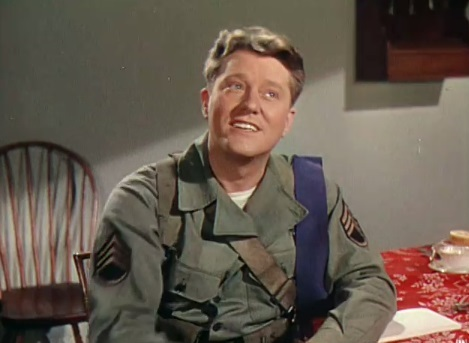
Michael O'Shea

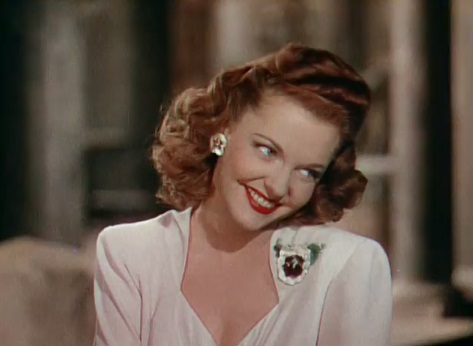
Vivian Blaine

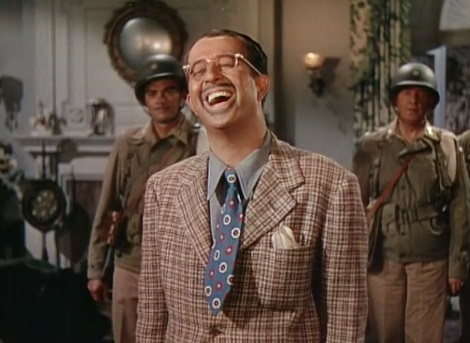
Phil Silvers

== Production ==
The film is based on the 1943 Broadway musical of the same name, which features songs by Cole Porter and was a vehicle for Ethel Merman, who played Blossom. However, the film version only uses the title song from Porter's soundtrack and does not feature any other songs from the stage show. The role of Chiquita was expanded for Carmen Miranda; in the musical, it is Blossom who receives messages through her fillings.

According to records from 20th Century Studios, in November 1942, the studio advanced $62,500 to Michael Todd and Savoy Productions for the production of the musical, then acquired the film rights in 1943. Under the agreement with Todd, the studio was not allowed to release the film until at least the summer of 1944 to avoid competing with the touring musical. William Perlberg was initially set to produce the film, with Irving Cummings to direct, and Betty Grable cast in the lead role.

In January 1944, H. Bruce Humberstone was assigned to direct the film, and Brenda Marshall was cast as the female lead. Humberstone auditioned the Jeepers, a seven-piece orchestra, but they do not appear in the final film.

Writers Harry Segall, Marian Spitzer, Eddie Welch, Snag Werris, Samuel Hoffenstein, and Betty Reinhardt worked on various versions of the script. Darryl F. Zanuck, the head of production at Twentieth Century-Fox, wanted the same writers who wrote the dialogue for Greenwich Village (a 1944 film starring Miranda) to write Miranda's dialogue for Something for the Boys, because "they wrote specifically for her, with mispronunciations, etc., and she is very funny when she gets this style of writing."

The medley "Southland Routine," performed by Phil Silvers, includes excerpts from the songs "Southland" by Silvers, Harold Adamson, and Jimmy McHugh; "Dixie's Land" by Dan Emmett; "All Over God's Heaven," a traditional spiritual; "Shortnin' Bread," with lyrics by Jacques Wolfe; "Indian Dance" by Urban Theilman; and "Climin' Up Dem Golden Stairs" by Adamson and McHugh. Studio records contain letters from composers Jule Styne and Sammy Cahn, who claimed that the "Southland Routine" was based on their work. In early 1945, the studio paid the composers $3,000 to settle the claim. The owners of the radio program The Court of Missing Heirs filed a copyright infringement lawsuit against the producers and owners of Something for the Boys.

== Release ==
The film was released on November 1, 1944.

In June 2008, Something for the Boys was released on DVD as part of Fox's Carmen Miranda Collection.

== Reception ==
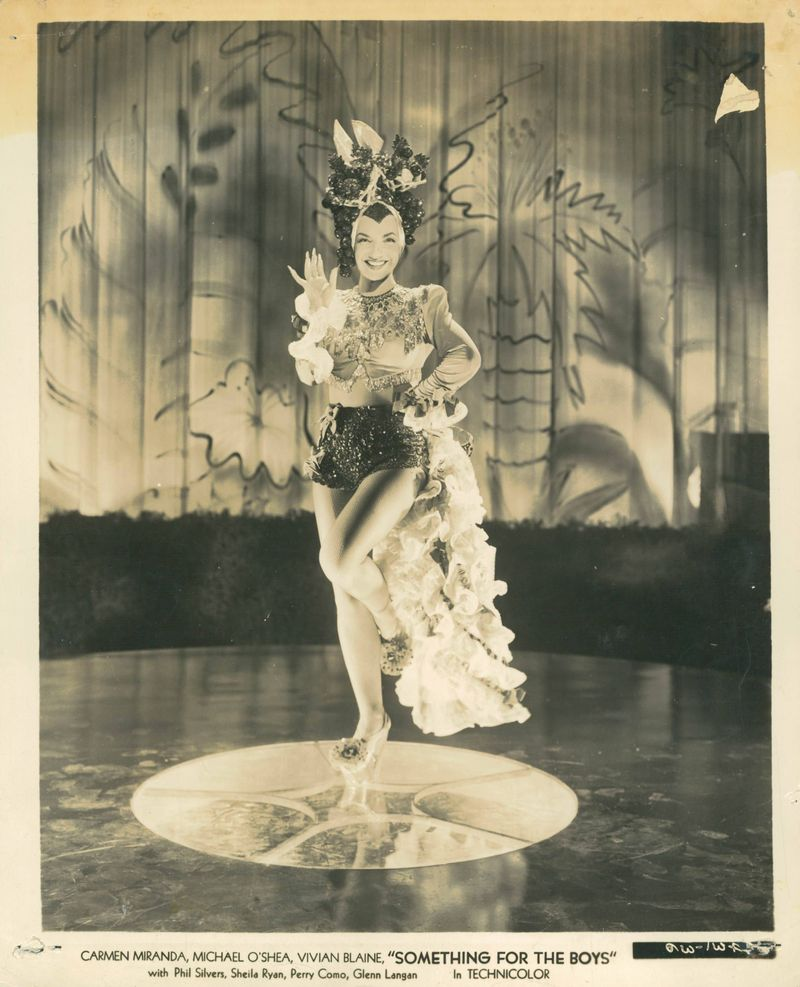
Carmen Miranda in Something For the Boys.

Bosley Crowther’s review in the New York Times of Something for the Boys describes the film as a musical comedy fable that clearly caters to the tastes of the male audience of the time. The movie is filled with beautiful women in Technicolor, with an abundance of blonde, brunette, and redheaded girls, all dressed in charming and well-fitted outfits, which is highlighted as the major appeal for the male audience. The cast includes Phil Silvers, Carmen Miranda, Vivian Blaine, Perry Como, and Michael O'Shea, and Crowther praises their performances. Silvers uses lowbrow comedy with his usual exaggerated performance, Blaine has a “vaudeville show” presence and sings some songs in a shy manner, while Carmen Miranda stands out with her energetic performance of "Samba Boogie." Perry Como, with his smooth singing in "I Wish We Didn't Have to Say Goodnight," also grabs attention. The review suggests that the film is a visual and musical spectacle, with an excess of female beauties and vibrant dance numbers primarily aimed at a male audience, although there is something for everyone, including the girls. Overall, Something for the Boys is described as a beautiful and overly colorful film, focused on pleasing the audience with plenty of music, humor, and visual charm.

In its review, Time describes the film as a production without major highlights or innovations. Carmen Miranda replaces Ethel Merman from the stage version, playing the girl whose energy and “radioactive teeth” help the soldier hero, played by Michael O'Shea, win a fictional battle and earn a promotion. The film also features O'Shea and Vivian Blaine dealing with a love interest and a selection of Cole Porter songs, along with six other new but less memorable songs. The magazine notes that the film has some pleasant musical numbers, well-lit and with a Technicolor aesthetic, and highlights Phil Silvers' comic energy, which, while likable, is described as overly “silly” and somewhat imprecise. Overall, Something for the Boys is considered a film with nothing particularly notable or impactful, with some good performances but lacking originality or depth.

Variety’s review points out that while the film includes some fun situations, the story, overall, does not have a significant impact on the dialogue or plot. The comedy is described as uneven, with some good laughs here and there, especially in moments of slapstick. Phil Silvers is noted for his effort on the comedic side, and his performance in a slapstick number is praised for providing minutes of reliable humor. The review concludes that, despite some good performances and moments of humor, the film fails to create a lasting impact.

Dave Kehr's review in the Chicago Reader of Something for the Boys suggests that despite the promise of a Cole Porter soundtrack and a star-studded cast, including Carmen Miranda, Vivian Blaine, Phil Silvers, and Perry Como, the film fails to be as entertaining as expected. Kehr points out that the musical has its moments, but it does not consistently maintain the pace or comedic impact. Despite its potential, the review suggests that the film does not live up to expectations, even though there are some fun elements here and there.
