= Man from Frisco =

1944 film by Robert Florey

- Directed by: Robert Florey
- Written by: Arnold Manoff (screenplay); George Worthing Yates (story)
- Produced by: Albert J. Cohen
- Cinematography: Jack A. Marta
- Edited by: Ernest J. Nims
- Distributed by: Republic Pictures
- Release date: June 15, 1944
- Running time: 91 minutes
- Country: United States
- Language: English
- Budget: $750,000

Man from Frisco (1944) is a United States feature-length spy and war film by Republic Pictures directed by Robert Florey and starring Michael O'Shea (1906–1973) and Anne Shirley.

== Plot ==
Matt Braddock is a civil engineer during the Second World War who has new ideas for shipbuilding. Braddock tries to establish yards for building prefabricated ships on the West Coast, but he is hindered by the former superintendent of the shipyard, Joel Kennedy.

A disappointed lover fails to deliver an important message on welds and it leads to the collapse of a new ship's superstructure and the death of a boy.

The subject of the film shows some degree of wartime propaganda. The lead character is said to be based on the real-life Henry J. Kaiser, and the film is set in the Kaiser Shipyards. Like the later Betrayal from the East (1945), Man from Frisco included actual radio reports of the negotiations with the Japanese before their attack on Pearl Harbor of December 7, 1941.

== Cast ==
- Michael O'Shea – Matt Braddock
- Anne Shirley – Diana Kennedy
- Gene Lockhart – Joel Kennedy
- Dan Duryea – Jim Benson
- Stephanie Bachelor – Ruth Warnecke
- Ray Walker – Johnny Rogers
- Tommy Bond – Russ Kennedy
- Robert Warwick – Bruce McRae
- Olin Howland – Eben Whelock (as Olin Howlin)
- Ann Shoemaker – Martha Kennedy
- Russell Simpson – Dr Hershey
- Stanley Andrews – Chief Campbell
- Forbes Murray – Maritime Commissioner
- Erville Alderson – Judge McLain
