= Parole, Inc. =

1948 Film Noir

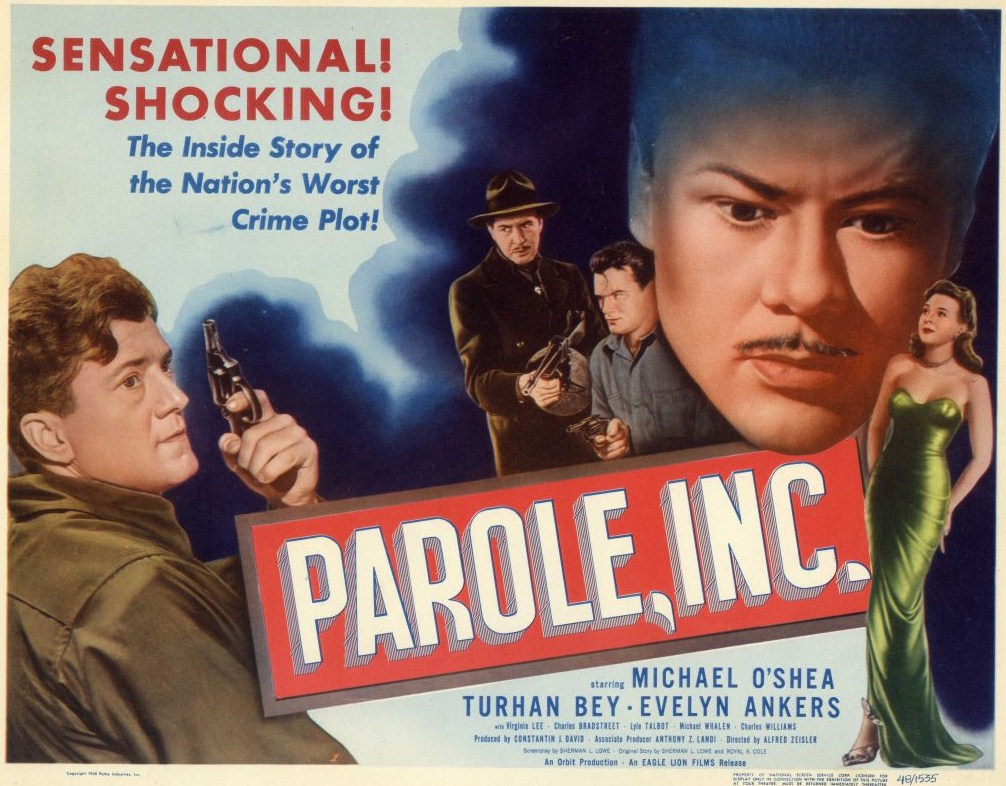
- Theatrical release poster
- Directed by: Alfred Zeisler
- Screenplay by: Sherman L. Lowe
- Story by: Royal K. Cole; Sherman L. Lowe
- Produced by: Constantin J. David
- Starring: Michael O'Shea; Turhan Bey; Evelyn Ankers; Virginia Lee
- Cinematography: Gilbert Warrenton
- Edited by: John Faure
- Music by: Alexander Laszlo
- Production companies: Equity Pictures; Orbit Productions
- Distributed by: Eagle-Lion films
- Release date: November 24, 1948 (Los Angeles)
- Running time: 71 minutes
- Country: United States
- Language: English

Parole, Inc. is a 1948 American crime film directed by Alfred Zeisler and starring Michael O'Shea, with Turhan Bey and Evelyn Ankers in support.

The film depicts an undercover FBI investigation of corruption within the state parole board of California targeting a bribery racket releasing career criminals.

== Plot ==
FBI agent Richard Hendricks lies in a hospital bed, dictating the results of his investigation for a report to the California governor. In long flashback scenes it is revealed that a number of dubious paroles granted to dangerous career criminals cause the governor and state attorney general to suspect corruption with the state prison parole board.

Hendricks goes undercover as "Rick Carson" to portray an ex-convict attempting to buy a parole for a criminal partner currently in jail. He infiltrates the gang of a recent dubious parolee, strongarm Harry Palmer, and asks him how to purchase a parole. Two thousand dollars is the price, which "Carson" pretends to get through a phony stickup to get the ball rolling. The perpetrators of the scandal are secretive and willing to take extreme measures to prevent their exposure.

== Cast ==
- Michael O'Shea as Richard Hendricks/Rick Carson
- Turhan Bey as Barney Rodescu
- Evelyn Ankers as Jojo Dumont
- Virginia Lee as Glenda Palmer
- Charles Bradstreet as Harry Palmer
- Lyle Talbot as Police Commissioner Hughes
- Michael Whalen as Kid Redmond
- Charles Williams as Titus Jones
- James Cardwell as Duke Vigili
- Paul Bryar as Charley Newton
- Noel Cravat as Blackie Olson
- Charles Jordan as Monty Cooper

== Reception ==
In a contemporary review, critic Edwin Schallert of the Los Angeles Times called the film "exceptionally good" and wrote: "Michael O'Shea as a government investigator does a fine, clean-cut job which will have the studios questing for him with regularity. The film is well directed by Alfred Zeisler, and has an okay documentary flavor."
