= Disc Jockey (film) =

1951 American film

- Directed by: Will Jason
- Written by: Clarke Reynolds
- Produced by: Maurice Duke
- Production company: Allied Artists
- Distributed by: Allied Artists
- Release date: 1951
- Country: United States
- Language: English

Disc Jockey is a 1951 American film directed by Will Jason and starring Ginny Simms, Tom Drake, Jane Nigh and Michael O'Shea. It was produced and distributed by Allied Artists.

== Plot ==
An American radio disc jockey is about to lose his program's sponsor because the sponsor believes that audiences are deserting radio for television. The disc jockey resolves to prove otherwise by collaborating with disc jockeys in major cities across the country.

== Cast ==
- Ginny Simms as Vickie Peters
- Tom Drake as Johnny
- Jane Nigh as Marion
- Michael O'Shea as Mike Richards
- Jerome Cowan as Chris Marley
- Red Nichols
- Tommy Dorsey
- Russ Morgan
- George Shearing
- Herb Jeffries as H. J. Ball
- Sarah Vaughan
- Nick Lucas
- Foy Willing and Riders of the Purple Sage
- The Weavers
- Jack Fina

== Production ==
Filming took place in May 1951.
