= Circumstantial Evidence (1945 film) =

1945 film

- Theatrical release poster
- Directed by: John Larkin
- Screenplay by: Robert F. Metzler; Samuel Ornitz
- Story by: Sam Duncan; Nat Ferber
- Produced by: William Girard
- Starring: Michael O'Shea; Lloyd Nolan
- Cinematography: Harry Jackson
- Edited by: Norman Colbert
- Music by: David Buttolph
- Distributed by: Twentieth Century-Fox
- Release date: April 20, 1945 (United States)
- Running time: 68 minutes
- Country: United States
- Language: English

Circumstantial Evidence is a 1945 American film noir directed by John Larkin and starring Michael O'Shea, Lloyd Nolan and Trudy Marshall.

== Plot ==
When Joe Reynolds confronts a cantankerous baker who has confiscated his son's toy hatchet, Kenny the baker is killed in the scuffle. Three witnesses see Joe raising the hatchet and assume that he has used it to kill Kenny, but Joe insists that Kenny died when his head struck an oven. On trial, Joe is sentenced to death on the strength of the witnesses' testimony.

Joe is on death row and his appeals for a retrial are denied. Sam Lord, the town mailman and coordinator of youth activities, believes in Joe's innocence and organizes a boys' boxing match, including Joe's son, with the governor and a prominent judge in attendance. After the match, several of the boys stage a fake incident very similar to the murder in an effort to demonstrate how witnesses can mistake what they see. The governor and judge are moved by the stunt and indicate that Joe's case deserves a review. The governor grants a stay of execution.

Unaware of the events at the boxing match, Joe is desperate and seizes upon an opportunity to escape after forcing his way into the prison's medical ward. An accomplice has arranged for Joe to secretly depart on a ship under an assumed identity. However, when Joe reaches town, he learns of the chance for clemency and is convinced by Sam at gunpoint to sneak back into prison. He is nearly caught but reaches the medical ward just in time for an unexpected visit from the doctor.

The charges against Joe are dismissed and he is reunited with his son.

== Cast ==
- Michael O'Shea as Joe Reynolds
- Lloyd Nolan as Sam Lord
- Trudy Marshall as Agnes Hannon
- Billy Cummings as Pat Reynolds
- Ruth Ford as Mrs. Simms
- Reed Hadley as Prosecutor
- Roy Roberts as Marty Hannon
- Scotty Beckett as Freddy Hanlon

Uncredited (in order of appearance)

- Byron Foulger as Bolger
- John Eldredge as Judge White
- Selmer Jackson as Warden
- John Hamilton as Governor Hanlon
- Ben Welden as Kenny, the murdered baker
- Dorothy Adams as Bolger's wife
- Edward Earle as Doctor
- William B. Davidson as Chairman
- Ralph Dunn as Officer Cleary
- Ray Teal as Policeman
- Lee Phelps as Policeman
- Thomas E. Jackson as Detective
- Sam Flint as Prison board member
- George Melford as Prison board member
- John Davidson as Lawyer
- J. Farrell MacDonald as Jury foreman
- Max Wagner as Truck driver
- James Flavin as Guard
- Ken Christy as Guard
- Eddie Dunn as Guard
- Lee Shumway as Guard
- Lester Dorr as Prisoner
- Emmett Vogan as Bridge player
- Harry Strang as Prison guard

== Reception ==
In a contemporary review for The New York Times, critic Bosley Crowther wrote:

Darryl Zanuck must have had his back turned when Circumstantial Evidence slipped out the front gate of the Twentieth Century-Fox Studio. For a sillier and more tediously worked-out piece of crime melodrama ... hasn't reached Broadway in a long, long time. "Circumstantial Evidence" is so full of hackneyed and incredible plot turns that one can never get even slightly interested in the involved set of circumstances ... Mr. O'Shea's innocence could have been established in the second-reel had the scenarists let the county coroner examine the victim. That would have been logical police procedure, but then there is nothing logical about this picture.
