= The Threat (1949 film) =

1949 film by Felix E. Feist

- Theatrical release poster
- Directed by: Felix E. Feist
- Screenplay by: Dick Irving Hyland; Hugh King
- Story by: Hugh King
- Produced by: Hugh King
- Starring: Michael O'Shea; Virginia Grey; Charles McGraw
- Cinematography: Harry J. Wild
- Edited by: Samuel E. Beetley
- Music by: Paul Sawtell
- Distributed by: RKO Radio Pictures
- Release date: December 1, 1949 (United States)
- Running time: 66 minutes
- Country: United States
- Language: English

The Threat is a 1949 American film noir starring Michael O'Shea, Virginia Grey and Charles McGraw, and directed by Felix E. Feist.

== Plot ==
Detective Ray Williams (Michael O'Shea) is recuperating from a broken rib as his wife Ann (Julie Bishop) tries to persuade him to get a desk job, especially with their new baby on the way. However, a call from the police inspector (Robert Shayne) informs him that homicidal criminal "Red" Kluger (whom Ray apprehended) has escaped from Folsom Prison. As Ray is about to leave in his police car, he is kidnapped by Kluger (Charles McGraw) and his men. They also kidnap district attorney Barker MacDonald (Frank Conroy). Kluger has sworn that he would kill both men for sending him to prison. Lastly, nightclub singer Carol (Virginia Grey), who apparently ratted Kluger out, is kidnapped. However, she repeatedly denies being the rat and claims the rat was Tony, Kluger's partner. Kluger doesn't believe her; he has arranged for Tony to come up from Mexico City to the small desert town of Banning to give Red and his gang part of the proceeds from the robbery that Kluger went to prison for and provide them with a small plane to escape the country in. Kluger makes no secret of his plans to kill Ray and MacDonald once he's made a getaway. Kluger also takes another hostage, Joe Turner, the unsuspecting driver of a truck the gang hires to haul an unspecified load to Palm Springs. The load turns out to be a car containing Kluger, all of his gang except for one henchman (who rides up front with Joe to keep an eye on him), Carol, and the two kidnap victims. The gang successfully eludes the police roadblocks and makes their way to a shack outside Banning, where they await Tony, handcuffing Ray and MacDonald in a back room. Joe tries to escape with a gun he had taken from the truck earlier, but Kluger convinces him to give up the gun by pointing out that the other henchmen will shoot him if he shoots Kluger, and then kills him once he is unarmed.

By threatening to torture the older MacDonald, Kluger forces Ray to give the police a false lead on the radio to throw them off. Ray surreptitiously leaves a clue for his wife that he is in danger by asking the police radio man to tell his wife to give his regards to their unborn child, Dexter, which his wife finds suspicious due to Ray's previous statements that he'd name the newborn Dexter only if he had a gun to his back. As the henchmen drink beer and doze in the heat, Carol manages to slip the handcuff keys to Ray and MacDonald in the back room. Ray and MacDonald subdue and tie up the henchmen, then call out to Kluger to come get them. Kluger shoots through the door to the back room, spreading his bullets and hitting Ray in the leg. When Kluger hears Tony's plane overhead, he rushes outside to signal to it. Despite his wound, Ray climbs up into the rafters above the door to the back room, as MacDonald tries to bait Kluger to come to them. As Kluger approaches the door, Ray jumps Kluger, knocking Kluger's gun away. Kluger overpowers Ray and incapacitates him by smashing a chair over his head. Before Kluger can retrieve his gun and finish Ray off, Carol picks up the gun and shoots Kluger twice, killing him. Ray gets up and thanks her, saying that he will deal with Tony.

The film ends with Ray talking with Ann about the naming of their child, and she reveals that only one will be named Dexter – because they're having twins.

== Cast ==
- Michael O'Shea as Detective Ray Williams
- Virginia Grey as Carol
- Charles McGraw as Arnold "Red" Kluger
- Julie Bishop as Ann Williams
- Frank Conroy as District Attorney Barker MacDonald
- Robert Shayne as Inspector "Murph" Murphy
- Anthony Caruso as Nick Damon
- Don McGuire as Joe Turner
- Frank Richards as Lefty
- Michael McHale as Detective Jensen

== Reception ==
When released The New York Times gave the film a positive review, writing, "...[the film is] reasonably well written...[and] Charles McGraw is first-rate as the gravel-voiced, square-jawed, ruthless gangster, while Michael O'Shea, Virginia Grey and Frank Conroy chip in with adequate portrayals of the cop, district attorney and gangster's moll. Crime, after all, does not pay, but Mr. McGraw can make it diverting."
