= Blonde Ransom =

1945 film by William Beaudine

- Directed by: William Beaudine
- Written by: M. Coates Webster; Robert T. Shannon
- Produced by: Gene Lewis
- Starring: Donald Cook; Virginia Grey; Pinky Lee
- Cinematography: Maury Gertsman
- Edited by: Paul Landres
- Music by: Frank Skinner
- Production company: Universal Pictures
- Distributed by: Universal Pictures
- Release date: May 1945
- Running time: 68 minutes
- Country: United States
- Language: English

Blonde Ransom is a 1945 American comedy film directed by William Beaudine and starring Donald Cook, Virginia Grey, and Pinky Lee.

== Plot ==
Duke Randall owns of the Paradise Gardens, a nightclub in Manhattan. A considerable poker loss makes him the debtor of Ice Larson, a gangster. To repay his debt he is given one week or Larson will receive the club in exchange. On his way home Duke has a car accident: he crashes his car to avoid Vicki Morrison's, a rich woman; she takes him home unconscious. There he meets William Morrison, Vicki's uncle. At night, back at the Paradise Gardens, he receives the visit of Larson, and later of Vicki. A dispute ensues. Later, Vicki is kidnapped.

== Cast ==
- Donald Cook as Duke Randall
- Virginia Grey as Vicki Morrison
- Pinky Lee as Pinky Lee
- Collette Lyons as Sheila
- George Barbier as Uncle William Morrison
- Jerome Cowan as Ice Larson
- George Meeker as Forbes
- Ian Wolfe as Oliver
- Joe Kirk as Bender
- Charles Delaney as McDaily
- Frank Reicher as Judge
- William B. Davidson as Police Captain
- Chester Clute as Clerk
- Janina Frostova as Gypsy Dancer

== Bibliography ==
- Marshall, Wendy L. William Beaudine: From Silents to Television. Scarecrow Press, 2005.
