= It Should Happen to You =

1954 film by George Cukor

It Should Happen to You!
- Theatrical release poster
- Directed by: George Cukor
- Written by: Garson Kanin
- Produced by: Fred Kohlmar
- Starring: Judy Holliday; Peter Lawford; Jack Lemmon; Michael O'Shea
- Cinematography: Charles Lang
- Edited by: Charles Nelson
- Music by: Frederick Hollander
- Production company: Columbia Pictures
- Distributed by: Columbia Pictures
- Release dates: January 15, 1954 (New York City); March 1954 (United States)
- Running time: 87 minutes
- Country: United States
- Language: English
- Box office: $1.4 million

It Should Happen to You is a 1954 American romantic comedy film starring Judy Holliday, Peter Lawford and Jack Lemmon; it was Lemmon's first major film appearance. The film was directed by George Cukor, and partly filmed on location in New York City. Screenwriter Garson Kanin originally intended the script as a vehicle for Danny Kaye, but Kanin's wife, Ruth Gordon, suggested casting Judy Holliday instead. The title was initially A Name for Herself.

Lemmon had a contentious meeting with studio boss Harry Cohn, who feared that critics might use jokes about the name "Lemmon" in headlines panning the film. He wanted Lemmon to change his name to "Lennon". Lemmon countered that if he did that, people might confuse his name with "Lenin" and associate his name with communism—a legitimate concern in the 1950s.

== Plot ==
Gladys Glover is a young woman who yearns for fame. Strolling through Central Park, she meets Pete Sheppard, who is a documentary maker. Gladys tells him she has just been fired and has $1,000 saved up. Despite her savings, she is discouraged at having got nowhere in two years and she wants to make a name for herself. Pete, who is clearly taken with her, gets her address by offering to drop her a postcard when the documentary is finished so she can see herself in it. He encourages her to follow her dreams before the two part ways.

Wandering despondently, Gladys's attention is caught by a large billboard overlooking Columbus Circle that is available for rent. She has visions of her name on the billboard, and manages to secure it. Within a few days the sign is up and she is thrilled. However, it turns out the Adams Soap company has traditionally booked the sign and is upset to learn that another client has obtained it. She is called to a meeting where Evan Adams III attempts to induce her to give up the sign by offering her more money. Gladys is not interested. She is called to another meeting and is offered six signs in exchange for the one. This time, she accepts. Now, there are six huge signs in New York, one in lights, each saying simply "Gladys Glover".

Meanwhile, Pete has taken an apartment adjacent to Gladys, and the two become friends. Pete is, however, exasperated by Gladys's fascination with her signs and her requests he tour the city with her to see them. City-goers are intrigued by the mysterious signs. Gladys shops in Macy's department store, and when she gives her name, the word spreads quickly and dozens of people flock to get her autograph.

Soon, Gladys is being asked to appear on television shows, where she is treated as a figure of fun. Pete is not pleased with her portrayal on television, but Gladys does not seem to realize that she is not being depicted in the most flattering light. As she becomes more known to the public, Evan Adams III hires her to do a series of advertisements for Adams Soap. While Gladys pursues what is becoming a lucrative career, relations between her and Pete become strained, as he sees no merit in her ambition to be famous. At the same time, Adams is showing an increasing interest in her. The situation reaches a crisis when Gladys breaks a date with Pete and his parents in order to attend what Adams says is a business conference to discuss a cross-country publicity tour. The conference turns out to be an attempted seduction, and she leaves. When she arrives home she finds a film from Pete confessing that he loves her, and that the film is his farewell.

Gladys's advertising career continues, but she begins to find the jobs more humiliating, and their emptiness frustrating. She recalls Pete's frequent questions as to why she wants to be above the crowd instead of being happy as part of the crowd. When a plane is named after her by the USAF, she is asked to speak at a ceremony, but breaks off, realizing the truth behind Pete's words.

She finally resolves to end her quest for fame, and arranges for a plane to skywrite a message to Pete, which he reads while filming a crowd sequence in the zoo.

Ultimately, Gladys and Pete are married and while driving on their honeymoon discussing their future plans, Gladys's attention is caught by an empty billboard available for rent. Pete notices this and asks what she is looking at, and Gladys replies as she embraces him: "Nothing, absolutely nothing!"

== Cast ==
- Judy Holliday as Gladys Glover
- Peter Lawford as Evan Adams III
- Jack Lemmon as Pete Sheppard
- Michael O'Shea as Brod Clinton
- Vaughn Taylor as Entrikin
- Connie Gilchrist as Mrs. Riker
- Walter Klavun as Bert Piazza
- Whit Bissell as Robert Grau
- Constance Bennett as Herself, TV panelist
- Ilka Chase as Herself, TV panelist
- Wendy Barrie as Herself, TV panelist
- Melville Cooper as Dr. Manning, TV panelist

A teenage John Saxon also appears in the film, as an uncredited extra in Central Park.

== Reception ==
On Rotten Tomatoes, this film holds a rating of 100%, based on eight reviews, indicating an encouraging response.

When the film appeared, Bosley Crowther, writing in The New York Times, called it "a neat piece of comic contrivance that will contribute to the joy of man" with "intelligence, compassion, and lots of gags." Holliday is "brilliantly droll", and the script "a compound of clever situation and broad but authentic character, wrapped up in free splurged emotions and witty, idiomatic dialogue." He said the role in which Jack Lemmon was cast, referring to him as the "new young man", was "played superbly".

The Brooklyn Eagle found it a "lightweight but plenty funny" film that "depends on inspired dialogue and the Judy Holliday personality for its appeal....Her dialogue ... always has an unexpected twist, and Judy handles it with her now famous skill. However, the story is so meager that the film leaves a kind of void in its wake. It is more of a character study, if that term can be applied to a Judy Holliday film, than a plot-sized picture....It's sophisticated and bright as it stands, but it could have been expanded into a more involved story without losing any of its comedy."

The Buffalo Evening News was enthusiastic without reservation: "It is difficult to communicate the charm of 'It Should Happen to You' with a simple account of the story....If you think this is too thin for the most delightful comedy since 'Born Yesterday,' you reckon without its Lafayette star, Judy Holliday; its screenwright, Garson Kanin; and the wittiest director surviving the late Lubitsch, George Cukor."

== Awards ==
- The film was nominated for an Oscar for Best Costume Design (Black-and-White).
- The film was also nominated for Writers Guild of America Award (Screen) for Best Written American Comedy.
