= The Great Garrick =

1937 film by James Whale

- Theatrical release poster
- Directed by: James Whale
- Screenplay by: Ernest Vajda; Rowland Leigh (uncredited)
- Based on: Ladies and Gentlemen; 1937 play by Ernest Vajda
- Produced by: Mervyn LeRoy
- Starring: Brian Aherne; Olivia de Havilland; Edward Everett Horton
- Cinematography: Ernest Haller
- Edited by: Warren Low
- Music by: Adolph Deutsch
- Production company: Warner Bros. Pictures
- Distributed by: Warner Bros. Pictures
- Release date: October 30, 1937 (USA)
- Running time: 89 minutes
- Country: United States
- Language: English

The Great Garrick is a 1937 Warner Bros. historical comedy film starring Brian Aherne, and Olivia de Havilland. An ensemble cast includes Edward Everett Horton, Melville Cooper, Lionel Atwill, and Luis Alberni in support, and Marie Wilson and Lana Turner in credited bit parts.

Directed by James Whale, it is based on the play Ladies and Gentlemen by Ernest Vajda about the famous eighteenth-century British actor David Garrick, who travels to France for a guest appearance at the Comédie Française. When the French actors hear rumors that he said he will teach them the art of acting, they devise a plot to teach him a lesson. Though often overlooked by critics in favor of Whale's horror films, The Great Garrick was chosen by Jonathan Rosenbaum for his alternative list of the Top 100 American Films.

== Plot ==
In London in 1750, renowned English actor David Garrick announces at the end of a performance that he has been invited to Paris to appear with the prestigious Comédie-Française. A fop declares that the French want Garrick to teach them how to act, and the audience raises the chant, "Teach the French!"

The playwright Beaumarchais, who was there, attributes the remark to Garrick himself, which outrages the Parisian theatre company. He devises a plot to cut Garrick down to size. The troupe, led by their president, Picard, takes over the inn where he will be staying en route to lay on an ambush.

On the road there Garrick meets Jean Cabot, an elderly admirer who once acted in a play with him and now works as a prompter for the Comédie. Cabot—who was tossed out of the actors-only meeting when he protested Garrick's potential innocence—has ridden non-stop to warn his idol. Garrick refuses to listen to the details of the plot, and insists they will stop as planned despite the misgivings of his valet/companion Tubby over their safety.

When Garrick and Tubby arrive at the inn, the "blacksmith" smashes a sound carriage wheel to ensure they cannot flee. Garrick simply ignores his antagonists’ further antics, however extreme: tumbling luggage, violent swordplay, gunshots in a lovers quarrel, a mad waiter, it matters not.

Virginial young beauty Germaine, Lady de la Corbe, appears at the inn. Her coach has broken down in flight from her father and an odious marriage he has arranged. Believing she is one of the actresses, Garrick plays along, offering her his room when no other is available. Over the course of the evening they court romantically at every turn.

Upon parting, Garrick overhears the drunken "blacksmith" reviewing his script. He tosses the miscreant into a pond and disguises himself in his place. After telling the aghast company that he has killed Garrick, the spooked actors ready to flee. Catching them off their guard, Garrick reveals himself and derides the Comédie's performance, then pivots in place and expresses his admiration for the troupe and disclaims he ever said he would go to Paris to teach it how to act.

Afterwards, he storms at Germaine for her bad acting and even worse sex. Infuriated, she bewails that she does not have the necessary experience to fool him. Garrick assails her to quit the stage.

Downstairs, Picard apologizes on behalf of the company and begs Garrick to join them in Paris. He graciously accepts.

At his premiere in the lead of Don Juan Garrick searches backstage for Germaine. He learns from Picard that she was just a random traveler. Realizing that she had been truthful in expressing her love for him, and that he indeed loved her, he declares that he is too distraught to perform ever again. He goes out to express his regrets to the audience and spies Germaine in a box, beaming. Dumbstruck, he sees prompter Cabot hold up a sign assuring him that she understands his error and all is well.

Inspired, Garrick expresses his passion for her veiled in showers of praise for La Belle France. She tosses him a flower, triggering a rain of blossoms from the audience.

== Cast ==
- Brian Aherne as David Garrick
- Olivia de Havilland as Germaine
- Edward Everett Horton as Tubby
- Melville Cooper as M. Picard
- Lionel Atwill as Beaumarchais
- Luis Alberni as Basset
- Lana Turner as Auber
- Marie Wilson as Nicolle
- Linda Perry as Molee
- Fritz Leiber Sr. as Horatio
- Etienne Girardot as Jean Cabot
- Dorothy Tree as Mme. Moreau
- Craig Reynolds as M. Janin
- Paul Everton as Innkeeper of Adam and Eve
- Trevor Bardette as M. Noverre
- Milton Owen as Thierre
- Albert Dekker as LeBrun
- Chester Clute as M. Moreau

== Production ==
The film was made by James Whale for Warner Bros. Pictures shortly after the troubled production of The Road Back, which had met with controversy and opposition from the Nazi government, and strained his relationship with his bosses at Universal Pictures where he had worked for the past six years. The Garrick film was intended to be a more light-hearted effort. However, both it and his next film Port of Seven Seas were failures at the box office. Whale eventually returned to Universal where he saw out his contract largely by making B Movies.

== Reception ==
The New York Times critic Frank Nugent praised the film and Aherne's performance:

Of the many legends about David Garrick, that almost legendary figure of the 18th-century theater, count as one of the most amusing The Great Garrick ... Brian Aherne (presents) Garrick as the young and handsome swashbuckler we rather hoped to find. ... (The film) is an agile and picturesque farce within a farce... most amusingly presented and humorously resolved.

Variety called it:

... a production of superlative workmanship fabricated from old prints of the period, and acting by a fine cast in the flamboyant manner demanded by the script...not without some very amusing angles. Fact is, it is a farce, should be played as a farce with speed and increasing hilarity. Such, however, is not the case. Whale's direction is geared to a slow tempo. His romantic passages between Aherne and De Havilland are quite charming, but much too long.

In 1998, Jonathan Rosenbaum of the Chicago Reader included the film in his unranked list of the best American films not included on the AFI Top 100. In a 2001 review, Rosenbaum calls it "conceivably the most neglected of James Whale’s better works" and a "hilarious period farce". Rosenbaum writes: "Boisterous and high-spirited, this sport of a movie helps to justify critic Tom Milne’s claims that Whale was a kind of premodernist Jean-Luc Godard; rarely have the art and pleasure of acting, demonstrated here in countless varieties of ham, been demonstrated with as much self-reflexive energy (...), and Whale’s enjoyable cast (...) takes full advantage of the opportunity."

In 2006, Dennis Schwartz wrote that this "neglected period farce deserves more attention and love; it's one of Whale's most joyous films and shows he can make great comedies outside of the horror genre... It's a thoroughly enjoyable romantic comedy, with the ensemble cast in fine form and under Whale's able direction it catches all the fun in the farce."
