= Dangerously They Live =

1941 film by Robert Florey

- Directed by: Robert Florey
- Written by: Marion Parsonnet
- Produced by: Bryan Foy; Benjamin Stoloff
- Starring: John Garfield; Nancy Coleman; Raymond Massey
- Cinematography: L. William O'Connell
- Edited by: Harold McLernon
- Music by: William Lava
- Production company: Warner Bros. Pictures
- Distributed by: Warner Bros. Pictures
- Release date: December 24, 1941
- Running time: 77 minutes
- Country: United States
- Language: English

Dangerously They Live is a 1941 American World War II spy thriller film directed by Robert Florey and starring John Garfield, Nancy Coleman and Raymond Massey. The plot concerns Nazi spies who try to pry information out of a British agent.

== Plot ==
In New York City, German agents arrange for Jane Greystone to take a taxi driven by one of their own men. The abduction goes awry when the taxi collides with another vehicle. Both driver and passenger are taken to the hospital in an ambulance attended by intern Dr. Mike Lewis. On the way, Jane regains consciousness and claims to have amnesia, and she cannot remember who she is. The driver reports this to his superiors. Mike is excited, as this is his area of study, and persuades Dr. Murdock to let him take the case.

John Goodwin appears and claims that Jane is his daughter. However, after he leaves, Jane tells Mike that he is lying, and that she is actually working for British intelligence. Mike doesn't believe her, especially when Goodwin returns with famous specialist Dr. Ingersoll, from whom Mike had taken a class.

When Jane adamantly refuses to go home with her "father," Ingersoll suggests that Mike accompany her in order to ease her mind, and Jane agrees. In private, she tells Mike that she wants to discover as much as she can about the Nazi spy ring. Mike finds it suspicious that the Goodwin mansion is heavily staffed, and he is not permitted to go anywhere without an escort. When Steiner, a reluctant German agent, balks at kidnapping, he is kept prisoner at the mansion. He manages to pass a note to Mike, warning him that Jane is in great danger. This finally convinces Mike that she has been telling the truth.

Mike manages to get away, but this only confirms Ingersoll's suspicion that Jane is faking her amnesia. By the time Mike returns with Sheriff Dill, the mansion is deserted except for Ingersoll. Still trusting his old teacher, Mike accompanies him to the district attorney. Ingersoll, however, has him committed as a doctor who became too close to the psychotics whom he was studying. A guard offers to let Mike escape for $500, but turns out to be working for the spies, and Mike ends up back in Ingersoll's hands.

By threatening Mike, Ingersoll coerces Jane to disclose the location of a large convoy, which he passes along to a U-boat wolfpack. Mike manages to wrestle a gun away from a henchman. After informing Ingersoll that she provided the wrong information, Jane notifies the authorities, who send bombers to sink the U-boats.

Later, Mike and Jane are in an auto accident. Jane once again pretends to have lost her memory, but regains it when Mike kisses her.

== Cast ==
- John Garfield as Dr. Michael Lewis
- Nancy Coleman as Jane Greystone
- Raymond Massey as Dr. Ingersoll
- Lee Patrick as Johnson, hospital superintendent of nurses
- Moroni Olsen as John Goodwin
- Esther Dale as Dawson, Goodwin's housekeeper
- John Ridgely as Nazi Henchman
- Christian Rub as Mr. Steiner
- Frank Reicher as Jarvis, Goodwin's butler
- Ben Welden as Eddie, Nazi henchman
- Cliff Clark as Sheriff John Dill
- Roland Drew as Dr. Murdock
- Arthur Aylesworth as Gate Keeper
- John Harmon as George, the taxi driver
- Gavin Muir as Captain Hunter
- Ilka Grüning as Mrs. Steiner
- Frank M. Thomas as Ralph Bryan
- James Seay as Carl
- Henry Victor as U-Boat Captain Horst
- Charles Drake as Joe
- Murray Alper as Miller
- Leslie Denison as Flight Lieutenant Tyler
- Tod Andrews as Dr. Craig
- Dick Wessel as Grant
- Joan Winfield as Nurse
- Audra Lindley as Nurse
- Sven Hugo Borg as U-Boat Under Officer
- Lon McCallister as Newsboy
- Jack Mower as Mailman
- Henry Rowland as Telegraph Operator

== Bibliography ==
- Fetrow, Alan G. Feature Films, 1940-1949: a United States Filmography. McFarland, 1994.
- Gelman, Howard. The Films of John Garfield. Citadel Press, 1975.
