= In Our Time (1944 film) =

1944 film by Vincent Sherman

- Directed by: Vincent Sherman
- Screenplay by: Elias St. Joseph; Howard Koch
- Produced by: Jerry Wald
- Starring: Ida Lupino; Paul Henreid; Nancy Coleman; Mary Boland; Victor Francen; Alla Nazimova
- Cinematography: Carl E. Guthrie
- Edited by: Rudi Fehr
- Music by: Franz Waxman
- Production company: Warner Bros. Pictures
- Distributed by: Warner Bros. Pictures
- Release date: February 19, 1944
- Running time: 110 minutes
- Country: United States
- Language: English

In Our Time is a 1944 American romantic drama film set in the days leading up to World War II. It stars Ida Lupino and Paul Henreid.

== Plot ==
In March 1939, English antiques dealer Mrs. Bromley and her assistant Jennifer "Jenny" Whittredge travel through Poland making purchases. In Warsaw, Jenny meets Count Stefan Orwid and, after a whirlwind courtship, he asks her to marry him.

However, Stefan's aristocratic family, particularly his sister Janina and his wealthy, diplomat uncle Count Pawel Orwid, is less than welcoming to the English commoner. His mother Zofyia merely wants to keep peace in the family. Only his other uncle, the ineffectual Leopold Baruta, welcomes her. Nonetheless, the wedding takes place.

Afterwards, Jenny encourages Stefan to break his family's dependence on Count Pawel's financial aid by persuading his peasant tenants to adopt more modern and efficient farming methods. It works; the harvest is bountiful, and Stefan accepts Jenny's suggestion that they invite the workers to a celebration party in his mansion. Count Pawel makes a surprise visit to express his strong disapproval of Jenny's democratic ideas. However, they are interrupted by the bombing of nearby Warsaw. War has broken out, despite Count Pawel's desperate attempts to placate Nazi Germany.

Stefan joins his Polish Army cavalry regiment, leaving Jenny to supervise the rest of the harvest. Days go by with conflicting radio reports. Finally, a dazed, wounded Stefan returns to the estate. His regiment was wiped out after charging tanks. He gathers the peasants and asks them to burn the crop and anything else that could be of use to the invaders. They patriotically agree. Count Pawel shows up to take the family to Romania. Stefan, Jenny, and Leopold remain behind to fight.

== Cast ==
- Ida Lupino as Jennifer Whittredge
- Paul Henreid as Count Stefan Orwid
- Nancy Coleman as Janina Orwid
- Mary Boland as Mrs. Bromley
- Victor Francen as Count Pawel Orwid
- Alla Nazimova as Zofia Orwid (as Nazimova)
- Michael Chekhov as Uncle Leopold Baruta
- Cyd Charisse as Ballerina

== Controversy ==
The movie presents a vision of Poland before and during the September 1939 campaign that was a propagandistic assault on the country. Mieczysław B. Biskupski describes it as a "piece of historical rubbish", which claims that despite everything the West had done, the war is essentially Poland's fault. The country is presented as being based on "meaningless symbols based on a distant past" with questionable patriotism; serfdom is still present (in reality, it was abolished in the 19th century), and the majority of Poles are depicted as pro-German, pro-Nazi, and sinister. The film also follows the myth that Polish cavalry had conducted charges on German tanks.

In the first versions of script, the opening montage was to present a map of the Poland from 16th century, which then would be burned down; afterwards, the map with the Second Polish Republic was planned to appear. In Biskupski's words, this was supposed to show that the previous downfall of Poland was solely the fault of the Polish nation, while carefully omitting Russia's role.

There are also doubts about the crew. Screenwriter Howard Koch had close ties with CPSU, and was probably its member in the 1930s. Director Vincent Sherman claimed that he had read about Polish history, but described it as the "South before the Civil War", thinking that peasants were supporting the landed gentry and large estates. Biskupski also notes, that the Daily Worker praised the movie, calling all the forces loyal to the Polish government-in-exile "reactionary".

== See also ==
- List of American films of 1944

== Bibliography ==
- Biskupski, M. B. B. (January 8, 2010). Hollywood's War with Poland, 1939-1945. University Press of Kentucky. ISBN 978-0-8131-7352-8.
