= Lady of Burlesque =

1943 film by William A. Wellman

- Theatrical release poster
- Directed by: William A. Wellman
- Written by: James Gunn
- Based on: The G-String Murders; 1941 novel by Gypsy Rose Lee
- Produced by: Hunt Stromberg
- Starring: Barbara Stanwyck; Michael O'Shea; J. Edward Bromberg; Charles Dingle; Frank Conroy; Gloria Dickson; Marion Martin; Iris Adrian; Victoria Faust; Pinky Lee; Frank Fenton; Janis Carter; Eddie Gordon
- Cinematography: Robert De Grasse
- Edited by: James E. Newcom
- Music by: Arthur Lange
- Distributed by: United Artists
- Release date: May 1, 1943
- Running time: 91 minutes
- Country: United States
- Language: English
- Budget: $719,572
- Box office: $1,850,000

Lady of Burlesque (also known as The G-String Murders and in the UK, Striptease Lady) is a 1943 American musical comedy mystery film directed by William A. Wellman, produced by Hunt Stromberg, and starring Barbara Stanwyck and Michael O'Shea. It is a faithful, if sanitized, adaptation of the 1941 novel The G-String Murders by burlesque performer and stripper Gypsy Rose Lee.

== Plot ==
A significant portion of the film is taken up with onstage performances, including comic bits and toned-down striptease acts. There is also a lot of backstage action not directly related to the evolving murder mystery but highlighting the characters and lifestyles of the performers and crew.

At a New York City burlesque theatre, performer Dixie Daisy (the stage name of Deborah Hoople) is becoming an audience favorite with her singing and striptease act. Backstage she has mixed interactions with other performers, some of whom are catty and jealous while others are quite friendly, especially Gee Gee Graham. Comic Biff Brannigan tries to get friendly with her, but Dixie turns him away, not having had good experiences with comics before.

During a police raid on the theatre for violating "public decency" laws, the backstage lights go out, and someone tries to strangle Dixie but stops when a stagehand comes by. A number of the performers and crew are thrown in jail but the theatre's owner and producer S.B. Foss bails them out and awards each a share in the company to keep them with him. A few nights later, another performer, Lolita LaVerne, is found strangled with a g-string after a violent argument with her boyfriend, gangster Louie Grindero. As a police investigation begins, the g-string believed to be the murder weapon goes missing and a number of possible suspects, both from the theatre and outside—including Dixie herself—come under suspicion. The coroner, though, reveals that Lolita's death was actually due to poison, and Biff reveals that he had hidden the g-string after someone had slipped it into his pocket, earning Dixie's appreciation. Biff, however, is arrested but released when new evidence is discovered.

When Biff and Daisy are on stage for a comedy skit, the body of another rival, Princess Nirvena, falls out of a prop; she has also been strangled with a g-string. The murders and related events begin to tie up, and Inspector Harrigan, the lead investigator, recommends shutting down the theatre for safety. Dixie, though, rallies the employees with a never-give-in speech, reminding them that they all now have ownership stakes in the company.

Dixie remains behind as everyone else leaves for the night. The aged stagehand Stacchi appears, confesses to the murders and tries to strangle Dixie. The police and Biff burst in and rescue her. It transpires that Dixie and her friend Gee Gee had decided to set a trap for the killer. Biff fills in additional information, having discovered that Stacchi was actually Lolita's grandfather, driven to an insane hatred of burlesque performers. With all problems resolved, Biff proposes to Dixie and she accepts.

== Cast ==
- Barbara Stanwyck as Deborah Hoople, aka Dixie Daisy, corresponding to Gypsy Rose Lee's character in her own book
- Michael O'Shea as Biff Brannigan, the romantic interest
- J. Edward Bromberg as S.B. Foss
- Iris Adrian as Gee Gee Graham, a worldly showgirl
- Gloria Dickson as Dolly Baxter
- Victoria Faust as Lolita La Verne
- Stephanie Bachelor as The Princess Nirvena
- Charles Dingle as Inspector Harrigan
- George Chandler as Jake, the prop boy
- Marion Martin as Alice Angel
- Pete Gordon as Officer Pat Kelly (as Eddie Gordon)
- Frank Fenton as Russell Rogers
- Pinky Lee as Mandy, a supporting player
- Frank Conroy as 'Stacchi' Stacciaro
- Lew Kelly as The Hermit
- Claire Carleton as Sandra
- Gerald Mohr as Louie Grindero

== Production ==
The film was produced by Hunt Stromberg, costumes by Edith Head, and filmed on a 21-day shooting schedule on (rented) sound stages at RKO's Encino movie ranch.

The film depicted as much as censors would allow with respect to the nature of "bumps and grinds", as well as the slapdash nature of burlesque shows. When reviewing the film script, which still carried Gypsy Rose Lee's original title, Joseph Breen, head of the Production Code Administration, the movie industry's self-censorship board, commented, "We are concerned about the prominent use of the object known as the 'G-String' as the murder weapon. It is our impression that the use of this extremely intimate female garment will be considered offensive . . . "

== Soundtrack ==
Songs include "Take It Off the E String, Play It on the G String", by Sammy Cahn (listed as "Sammy Kahn") and Harry Akst, sung by Stanwyck.

Other songs include

- "The Broadway Melody", written by Nacio Herb Brown
- "So This Is You", written by Cahn and Akst, performed by Frank Fenton (uncredited)
- "Burlique Bugle", by Gene Rose
- "Mama Inez", by Eliseo Grenet
- "Kamarinskaia" (Russian folk tune)
- "Ochi chyornye" (Russian folk tune)
- "Two Guitars" (Russian folk tune)
- "Temptation", Nacio Herb Brown
- "Ida, Sweet As Apple Cider", by Eddie Leonard
- "Paradise", by Nacio Herb Brown
- "Ireland Must Be Heaven", by Fred Fisher, Howard Johnson and Joseph McCarthy

== Reception ==
The film made $2 million and earned a hefty profit of $650,000.

Arthur Lange was nominated for the Academy Award for Best Music Score of a Drama or Comedy Picture.

The failure of the original copyright holder to renew the film's copyright resulted in it falling into public domain, meaning that virtually anyone could duplicate and sell a VHS/DVD copy of the film. Therefore, many of the versions of this film available on the market are either severely (and usually badly) edited and/or of extremely poor quality, having been duped from second- or third-generation (or more) copies of the film.

== Gallery ==
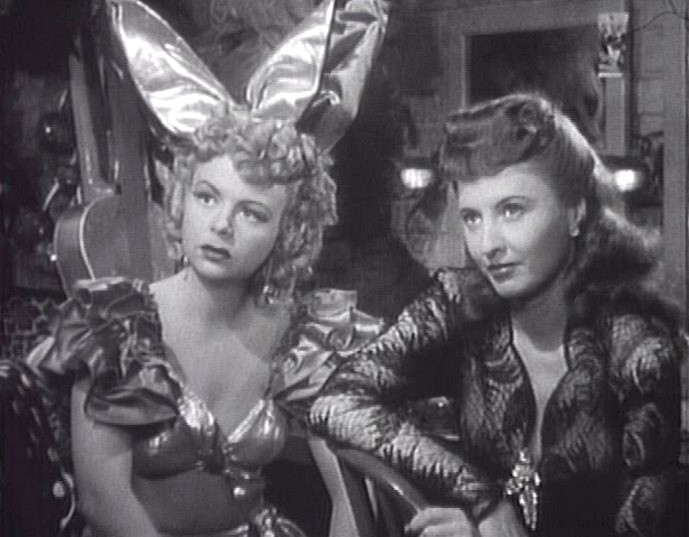
Iris Adrian and Barbara Stanwyck

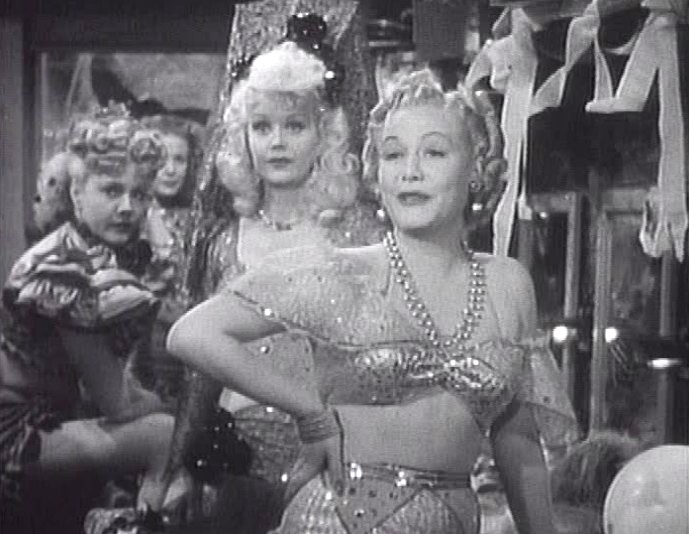
Marion Martin and Gloria Dickson
