= Pinky Lee =

American burlesque comic and host of a children's television program

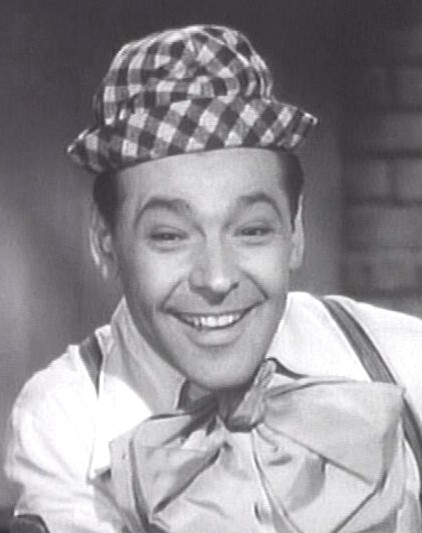
- Lee in Lady of Burlesque, 1943
- Born: Pincus Leff; May 2, 1907; Saint Paul, Minnesota, U.S.
- Died: April 3, 1993 (aged 85); Mission Viejo, California, U.S.
- Resting place: Mount Sinai Memorial Park Cemetery
- Occupation: Acting
- Years active: 1937–1979
- Spouse: Bebe Dancis Lee (m. 1932)
- Children: 2

Pinky Lee (May 2, 1907 – April 3, 1993) was an American actor of stage, screen, radio, and television. He is best known as a children's-TV personality of the 1950s.

== Biography ==
Born Pincus Leff in Saint Paul, Minnesota, Lee began his career as Pincus Leff with showman Gus Edwards in vaudeville. In January 1925, he was hired by Betty Felsen to be a dancer in the acclaimed Boderick & Felsen vaudeville dancing act. Pincus Leff soon became a featured tap dancer in the act and was often mentioned in advertisements, notices, and reviews. He was part of the act throughout 1925 during its headline tour on the B. F. Keith Circuit throughout the Mid-West and East. In early 1926, he left the act to pursue his career on stage and in film and television. He worked as a comic of the "baggy pants" variety on stage, becoming an expert at slapstick and comic dancing. In 1929 he was getting excellent notices for his participation in "Speed Show", an 18-minute stage prologue preceding the first-run film The Singing Fool: "Pinkie Leff, the only member allowed an encore though his wonderful acrobatic and eccentric steps."

When vaudeville died out, Pinkie Leff adopted the stage name of Pinky Lee and became a burlesque comedian, adding rapid-fire jokes to his repertoire. This new addition made him a radio star; he adopted a "sailor" character in a succession of NBC Radio programs. In 1937 he made his motion picture debut for Educational Pictures, starring in a 10-minute comedy short, Dental Follies, filmed in New York. During the 1940s, he was heard on Drene Time and other radio programs.

Easily recognized by his trademark lisp and high-energy antics, his signature costume was a loud plaid suit with baggy checkered pants and an undersized hat. During his routines, whenever anybody irritated him (which happened frequently) he would unleash his catchphrase: "Oooooh! You make me so mad!"

=== Television ===
Pinky Lee was one of the pioneers of commercial television, beginning in 1947. In 1950, he had his own 30-minute primetime variety television series on NBC, The Pinky Lee Show, featuring vaudevillians and burlesque comics. In 1951–52 he starred with Vivian Blaine in a 15-minute sitcom, Those Two.

He returned on January 4, 1954, with The Pinky Lee Show, a children's show sponsored by Tootsie Roll. An Emmy-nominated afternoon children's program that spawned later imitators such as Pee-Wee's Playhouse, it was followed each day by the popular Howdy Doody Show. Lee opened each show with his trademark theme song, "Yoo Hoo, It's Me!":

Yoo hoo, it's me,
My name is Pinky Lee.
I skip and run bring lots of fun
To every he and she.
It's plain to see
That you can tell it's me
With my checkered hat
And my checkered coat,
The funny giggle in my throat
And my silly dance
Like a billy goat.
Put 'em all together,
Put 'em all together,
And it's whooooo?
(Audience): PINKY!!!!!

Others in the cast: Betty Jane Howarth, Jimmy Brown, Molly Bee, Jack McCoy, Mel Koontz, Cindy Sue, Susabelle, Ken Mayer, Isabel Dwan, Sidney Fields, Margie Lizst, Milton Newberger and Jymme Shore. Adding to the show's bounce and style was its musical director and master organist Gaylord Carter, who underscored every moment with appropriate accompaniment.

On September 20, 1955, Lee collapsed on camera during a live show due to illness. His normal antics were so energetic that apparently the cameraman and the show's director assumed the fall an ad lib part of his performance. The "Peanut Gallery", an audience usually composed almost entirely of pre-adolescent children who were coached by a staff member, continued their enthusiastic cheering and applause from the on-stage bleachers. After as much as ten seconds of writhing by the stricken Lee, the camera abruptly panned to the still-cheering audience. The following afternoons Pinky Lee was not present. This effectively ended his leading role on the show, which continued without him until June 9, 1956.

Rumors that he had died of a heart attack, prompted by the incident, persisted for decades. Occasionally, newspaper items mentioned the "late" Lee – even though he was performing at a dinner theater in the same city as one of the reporting newspapers. The incident also spawned rumors that Lee had been institutionalized after going insane on live television.

In 1957, Lee hosted The Gumby Show, the original appearance of that clay animation character. In 1963, Lee attempted a return to kids' TV, hosting a local children's comedy program on KABC-TV in Los Angeles. This series was nationally syndicated for the 1964–65 TV seasons, but the program fell prey to creative interference from the show's producers and station management. Lee fought the interference, but his efforts were for naught. The Pinky Lee Kids TV Show went off the air after one season. One episode was released on DVD/VHS by Shokus Video, and a DVD with two episodes was released by Alpha Video.

Lee returned to television in 1983, appearing on NBC's Yummy Awards, a mock awards show hosted by Ricky Schroder that honored the best children's TV programming of the year.

=== Movies and theatre ===
Lee can be seen in films, including Lady of Burlesque, Earl Carroll Vanities, Pals of the Golden West, South of Caliente, and Blonde Ransom; and Lee appeared on television shows, including Ed Sullivan's Toast of the Town.

Lee also appeared in regional theatres throughout the U.S. in Sugar Babies and other shows in the late 1980s.

== Personal life ==
Lee was married to Bebe, with whom he had two children, Patricia Bonnie Lee and Morgan David Lee. Lee's brother-in-law was well-known Tin Pan Alley songwriter Al Sherman. Lee was the uncle of the Sherman Brothers, Robert and Richard, with whom he worked from time to time in the 1950s.

== Later years ==
In later years, Lee worked as a teacher and appeared in regional musical theater productions. He died in 1993 in Mission Viejo, California. His interment was at Mount Sinai Memorial Park Cemetery.

== Filmography ==
=== Film ===
| Year | Title | Role | Notes |
|---|---|---|---|
| 1937 | Dental Follies | Dentist | |
| 1943 | Lady of Burlesque | Mandy | |
| 1945 | Earl Carroll Vanities | Pinky Price | |
| 1945 | Blonde Ransom | Pinky Lee | |
| 1946 | One Exciting Week | Itchy | |
| 1951 | Pals of the Golden West | Photographer | |
| 1951 | South of Caliente | Pinky | |
| 1951 | Pals of the Golden West | Pinky | |
| 1954 | Hawaiian Nights | Pinky – the Valet | |
| 1960 | Ocean's 11 | Riviera Employee | Uncredited |

=== Television ===
| Year | Title | Role | Notes |
|---|---|---|---|
| 1951 | Those Two | Regular | |
| 1957 | The Gumby Show | Host | |
| 1957 | The Pinky Lee Show | Pinky Lee/Host | 5 episodes |
| 1960 | The Ed Sullivan Show | Comedian | 1 episode |
| 1979 | Here It Is, Burlesque! | Skits | TV Movie |

== Legacy ==
He was an inspiration for the Pee-wee Herman character.
