= Nancy Coleman =

American actress (1912–2000)

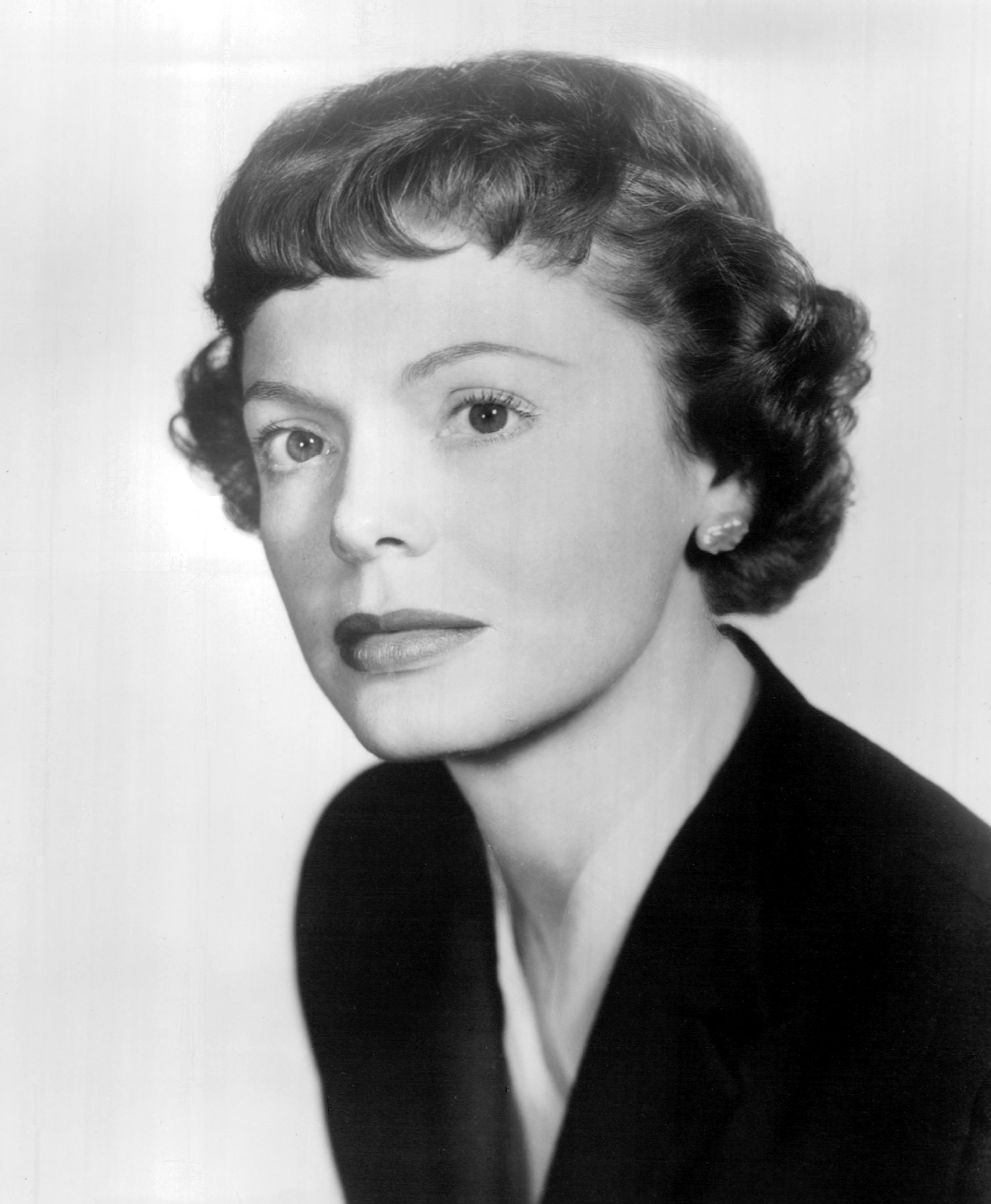
- Coleman in 1956
- Born: December 30, 1912; Everett, Washington, U.S.
- Died: January 18, 2000 (aged 87); Brockport, New York, U.S.
- Resting place: Lake View Cemetery
- Education: University of Washington
- Occupation: Actress
- Years active: 1938–1985
- Spouse: Whitney Bolton (m. 1943; died 1969)
- Children: 2

Nancy Coleman (December 30, 1912 – January 18, 2000) was an American film, stage, television and radio actress. After working on radio and appearing on the Broadway stage, Nancy Coleman moved to Hollywood to work for Warner Bros. studios.

== Early life ==
Coleman was born December 30, 1912, in Everett, Washington, where her father, Charles Sumner Coleman, was editor of The Daily Herald. Her mother, Grace Sharplass Coleman, was "an accomplished violinist." The family lived in Everett, Washington, where she graduated with honors from Everett High School.

She attended the University of Washington in Seattle where she majored in English and was a member of the Alpha Lambda chapter of Kappa Alpha Theta. After graduating, she was accepted at Columbia University's Teacher's College in New York. She attended the university, but dropped out, moving to San Francisco, California, where she worked as an elevator operator at a department store.

== Career ==
Early in her career as an actress, Coleman portrayed Alice Hughes on the radio version of the soap opera Young Doctor Malone. Coleman also appeared as the lead in the 04/13/1943 episode of "Suspense", entitled "Fear Paints a Picture". On television, she played Helen Emerson on Valiant Lady.

Coleman's Broadway credits include Liberty Jones (1941), The Sacred Flame (1952), and The Desperate Hours (1955).

Memorable roles include playing the mistress to a Nazi (played by Helmut Dantine) in Edge of Darkness and co-starring with Paul Henreid in In Our Time. In the 1950s, Coleman began making guest appearances on television. She also played Anne Brontë in the film Devotion (1946) opposite Olivia de Havilland and Ida Lupino.

== Personal life ==
Coleman married Whitney Bolton, a drama critic and publicity director, on September 16, 1943. They remained wed until his death in 1969. She gave birth to twin girls, Charla Elizabeth and Grania Theresa, on July 13, 1944.

== Filmography ==
Year	Title	Role	Notes
1941	Dangerously They Live	Jane	
1942	Kings Row	Louise Gordon	
1942	The Gay Sisters	Susie Gaylord	
1942	Desperate Journey	Kaethe Brahms	
1943	Edge of Darkness	Katja	
1944	In Our Time	Janina Orwid	
1946	Devotion	Anne Brontë	
1946	Her Sister's Secret	Antoinette 'Toni' DuBois	
1947	Violence	Ann Dwire, alias Ann Mason	
1947	Mourning Becomes Electra	Hazel Niles	
1953	That Man from Tangier	Mary Ellen	
1969	Slaves	Mrs. Stillwell	

== Bibliography ==
- Bubbeo, Daniel (2001). The Women of Warner Brothers: The Lives and Careers of 15 Leading Ladies with Filmographies for Each. McFarland. ISBN 978-0-786-41137-5.
