= Melville Cooper =

English actor (1896–1973)

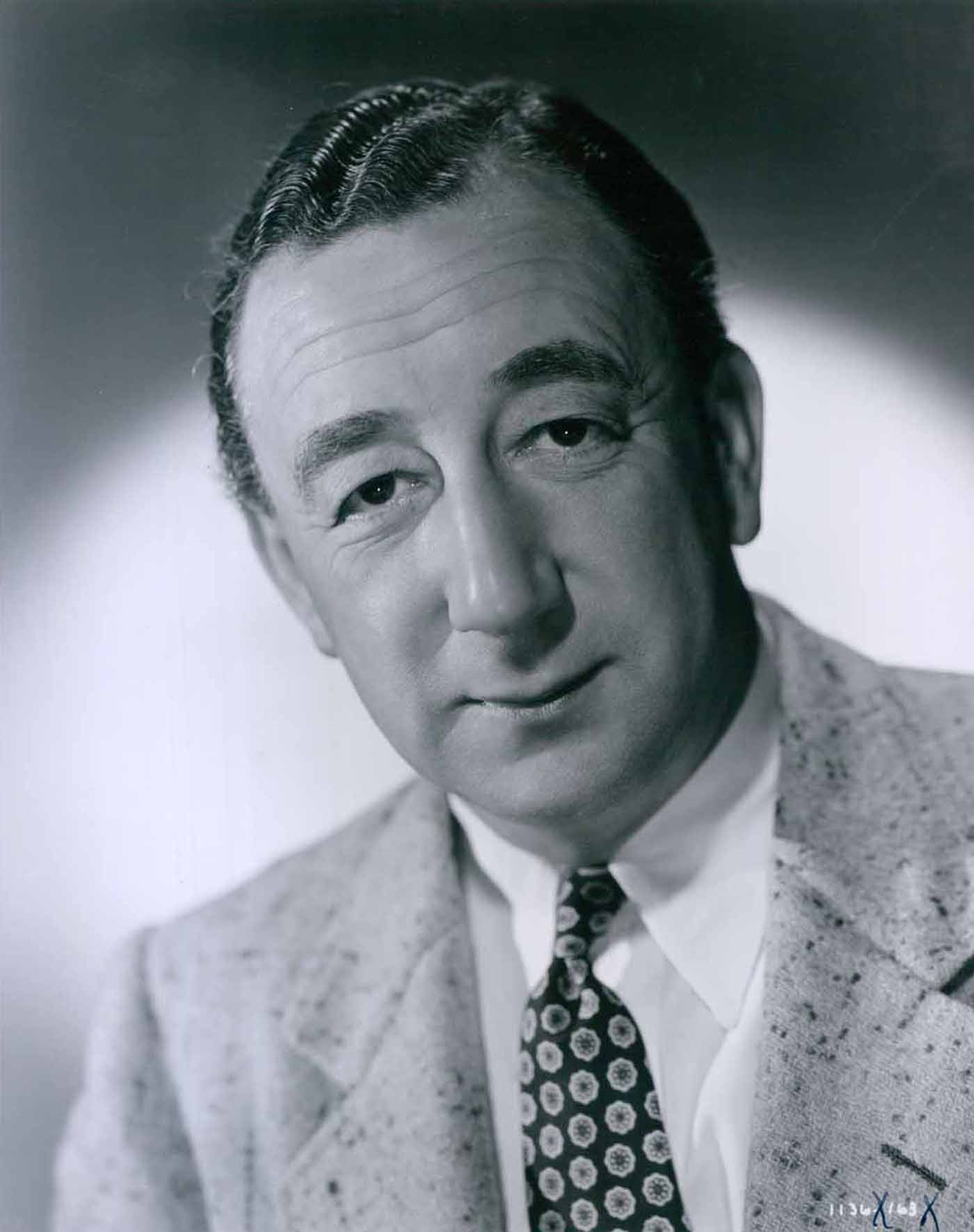
- Cooper in 1940
- Born: George Melville Cooper; 15 October 1896; Aston, Birmingham, Warwickshire, England
- Died: 13 March 1973 (aged 76); Los Angeles, California, U.S.
- Occupation: Actor
- Years active: 1914–1961
- Spouses: Gladys Grice (divorced); Rita Page (?–1954); Elizabeth Sutherland (?–1973)
- Children: 1

George Melville Cooper (15 October 1896 – 13 March 1973) was an English actor. His many notable screen roles include the High Sheriff of Nottingham in The Adventures of Robin Hood (1938), Mr. Collins in Pride and Prejudice (1940) and the wedding-rehearsal supervisor Mr. Tringle in Father of the Bride (1950).

== Biography ==
George Melville Cooper was born on 15 October 1896 in Aston, Birmingham, Warwickshire to W.C.J. and Frances (née Brennan) Cooper. He was brought up in Britain and attended public schools, including King Edward's School in Birmingham. He began to develop an interest in acting as a teenager. At the age of eighteen, he made his professional stage debut in a production at Stratford-upon-Avon. His budding acting career was interrupted by his military service in the Scottish regiment during the First World War, in which he was captured on the Western Front and held prisoner by the Germans for a brief time.

After the war, Cooper resumed his stage career, appearing in numerous stage productions, including The Farmer's Wife, Back to Methuselah, The Third Finger and Journey's End. He transitioned to film work in the early 1930s, appearing in Black Coffee (1931) with Austin Trevor and Adrianne Allen, Alexander Korda's The Private Life of Don Juan (1934) with Douglas Fairbanks and Merle Oberon and The Scarlet Pimpernel (1934) with Leslie Howard and Merle Oberon. In 1934, after receiving good reviews for his performance in The Private Life of Don Juan, Cooper moved to the United States.

In Hollywood, Cooper was generally cast as a snobbish, ineffectual society type or as a confidence trickster. His more memorable roles in the 1930s include M. W. Picard in The Great Garrick (1937) with Olivia de Havilland, Bingham the butler in Four's a Crowd (1938) with Errol Flynn and Olivia de Havilland, Boulin in Dramatic School with Luise Rainer and Paulette Goddard, and the cowardly Sheriff of Nottingham in The Adventures of Robin Hood (1938) with Errol Flynn and Olivia de Havilland. During the 1940s, Cooper continued to appear in some of the more popular films of the decade, including Alfred Hitchcock's Rebecca (1940) with Joan Fontaine, Pride and Prejudice (1940) with Greer Garson, The Lady Eve (1941) and You Belong to Me (1941) with Barbara Stanwyck and Henry Fonda, This Above All (1942) with Joan Fontaine, Random Harvest (1942) with Greer Garson, Henry Hathaway's 13 Rue Madeleine (1947) with James Cagney and The Red Danube (1949) with Walter Pidgeon. Cooper also appeared in Harvey, with James Stewart.

In the 1950s, he continued to appear in popular feature films, such as Father of the Bride (1950), It Should Happen to You (1954), and Around the World in 80 Days (1956), his second supporting role in an Academy Award-winning film. In addition to his film work throughout the decade, Cooper appeared in numerous television series, including Musical Comedy Time (1950–51), Fireside Theatre (1951), Kraft Television Theatre (1952), Robert Montgomery Presents (1952–53), Broadway Television Theatre (1952–53), Schlitz Playhouse of Stars (1954), Lux Video Theatre (1951–55), The Red Skelton Show (1956), Studio 57 (1957), Playhouse 90 (1957), Alfred Hitchcock Presents (1957), Shirley Temple's Storybook (1958), and Whirlybirds (1959). Cooper's final television appearance was on The Best of the Post (1961).

Towards the end of his career, Cooper focused on stage work and appeared in such productions as The Liar (1950), Much Ado About Nothing (1952), Escapade (1953), My Fair Lady (1956–62) and Hostile Witness (1966). Cooper's final acting role was Brassett in the revival of Charley's Aunt, which closed on 11 July 1970.

After a brief first marriage to Gladys Grice that ended in divorce, Cooper married actress Rita Page. Their marriage produced one child and ended with her death in London on 19 December 1954. Cooper's third marriage to Elizabeth Sutherland lasted until his death.

Cooper died of cancer on 13 March 1973 in Los Angeles, California.

== Filmography ==
- Black Coffee (1931) as Inspector Japp
- The Calendar (1931) as Mr. Wayne
- Wives Beware (1932) as Mack
- To Brighton with Gladys (1933) as Slingby
- Forging Ahead (1933) as Smedley
- Leave It to Me (1933) as Honorable Freddie
- The Private Life of Don Juan (1934) as Leporello
- The Scarlet Pimpernel (1934) as Romney
- The Bishop Misbehaves (1935) as Collins
- Rendezvous (1935) as Doorman (uncredited)
- The Gorgeous Hussy (1936) as Cuthbert
- The Last of Mrs. Cheyney (1937) as William
- Personal Property (1937) (scenes cut)
- Thin Ice (1937) as Krantz
- The Great Garrick (1937) as M. Picard
- Tovarich (1937) as Charles Dupont
- Women Are Like That (1938) as Mainwaring
- The Adventures of Robin Hood (1938) as High Sheriff of Nottingham
- Gold Diggers in Paris (1938) as Pierre aka Fernand LeBrec
- Four's a Crowd (1938) as Bingham
- Garden of the Moon (1938) as Maurice
- Hard to Get (1938) as Case
- Comet Over Broadway (1938) as Emerson
- Dramatic School (1938) as Boulin
- The Dawn Patrol (1938) as Sergeant Watkins
- I'm from Missouri (1939) as Hearne
- Blind Alley (1939) as George Curtis
- The Sun Never Sets (1939) as Cosey
- Two Bright Boys (1939) as Hilary Harrington
- Too Many Husbands (1940) as Peter
- Rebecca (1940) as Coroner
- Escape to Glory (1940) as Ship's Mate Penney
- Pride and Prejudice (1940) as Mr. Collins
- Murder Over New York (1940) as Herbert Fenton
- The Lady Eve (1941) as Gerald
- Scotland Yard (1941) as Dr. Crownfield
- The Flame of New Orleans (1941) as Brother-in-Law
- You Belong to Me (1941) as Moody
- This Above All (1942) as Wilbur
- The Affairs of Martha (1942) as Dr. Clarence Sommerfield
- Life Begins at Eight-Thirty (1942) as Barty
- Random Harvest (1942) as George
- Immortal Sergeant (1943) as Pilcher
- Hit Parade of 1943 (1943) as Bradley Cole
- Holy Matrimony (1943) as Dr. Caswell
- My Kingdom for a Cook (1943) as Angus Sheffield (uncredited)
- 13 Rue Madeleine (1946) as Pappy Simpson
- Heartbeat (1946) as Roland Latour
- The Imperfect Lady (1947) as Lord Montglyn
- Enchantment (1948) as Jones, the Jeweler
- The Red Danube (1949) as Private David Moonlight
- Love Happy (1949) as Throckmorton
- And Baby Makes Three (1949) as Gibson, Fletcher's Butler
- Father of the Bride (1950) as Mr. Tringle
- The Underworld Story (1950) as Major Redford
- The Petty Girl (1950) as Beardsley
- Let's Dance (1950) as Charles Wagstaffe
- It Should Happen to You (1954) as Guest Panelist #4
- Moonfleet (1955) as Felix Ratsey
- The King's Thief (1955) as Henry Wynch
- Diane (1956) as 1st Court Physician
- Around the World in 80 Days (1956) as Mr. Talley - Steward R.M.S 'Mongolia'
- Bundle of Joy (1956) as Adams, the Butler
- Alfred Hitchcock Presents (1957) (Season 2 Episodes 25, 26, 27: "I Killed the Count Part 1", "I Killed the Count Part 2", "I Killed the Count Part 3") as Mullet (Episodes 25, 26, 27) / Pat Lummock (Episodes 26 and 27)
- The Story of Mankind (1957) as Major Domo
- From the Earth to the Moon (1958) as Bancroft

== Radio appearances ==
Year	Program	Episode/source
1952	Theatre Guild on the Air	The Pickwick Papers
