= Something for the Boys =

Musical

- Music: Cole Porter
- Lyrics: Cole Porter
- Book: Herbert Fields; Dorothy Fields
- Productions: 1943 Broadway; 1944 WestEnd; 1944 film

Something for the Boys is a musical with music and lyrics by Cole Porter and a book by Herbert Fields and Dorothy Fields. Produced by Mike Todd, the show opened on Broadway in 1943 and starred Ethel Merman in her fifth Cole Porter musical.

== Productions ==
Out-of-town tryouts began on December 18, 1942, at the Shubert Theatre in Boston, Massachusetts.

The musical opened on Broadway at the Alvin Theatre on January 7, 1943, and closed on January 8, 1944, after 422 performances. It starred Ethel Merman (Blossom Hart), Bill Johnson (Rocky Fulton), Betty Garrett (Mary-Frances), Paula Laurence (Chiquita Hart), and Allen Jenkins (Harry Hart). The director was Hassard Short, choreography was by Jack Cole, costumes were by Billy Livingston, and the set design was by Howard Bay. A national tour starred Joan Blondell, who went on to marry producer Mike Todd.

The musical premiered in the West End at the Coliseum Theatre on March 30, 1944 and closed on May 20, 1944. It starred Evelyn Dall (Blossom), Daphne Barker (Chiquita), Bobby Wright (Harry), Leigh Stafford (Rocky) and Jack Billings (Laddie).

In 1981, an Off-Off-Broadway production at AMDA Studio One starred Patti Karr, Virginia Martin, and Carleton Carpenter.

The most recent production of the show was by Grace College in Winona Lake, Indiana, in May 2013 on the Rodeheaver Auditorium stage. Director Michael Yocum was able to find almost all of the original orchestrations, making this one of the first productions in decades to feature the original score.

== Plot ==
Three cousins inherit a Texas ranch that is next to a military base. Blossom Hart is a worker in the war department, Chiquita Hart is a nightclub dancer/singer, and Harry Hart is a carnival pitchman. Although none of the cousins knows each other, they join together to convert the ranch into a boarding house for soldiers' wives. However, Lieutenant Colonel Grubbs thinks the activities at the house are suspicious, and he tries to close it down. Meanwhile, Blossom and Rocky Fulton, a bandleader in the Army band, begin a romance, much to the displeasure of his fiancée, Melanie.

== Recordings ==
In 1985, the original cast recording was released on the AEI Records label, derived from long-lost transcriptions made for shortwave radio transmission.

A version of the title song was recorded by Ethel Merman for her Ethel Merman Disco Album in 1979.

PS Classics released a complete recording in December 2018, using the original orchestrations. The cast included Elizabeth Stanley (Blossom Hart), Danny Burstein (Harry Hart), Andréa Burns (Chiquita Hart), Edward Hibbert, Sara Jean Ford, and Philip Chaffin (Rocky Fulton).

== Songs ==
Act I

- See That You're Born in Texas - Ensemble
- When My Baby Goes to Town - Staff Sgt. Rocky Fulton
- Something for the Boys - Blossom Hart and Boys
- When We're Home on the Range - Blossom Hart, Chiquita Hart and Harry Hart
- Could It Be You? - Staff Sgt. Rocky Fulton and Boys
- Hey, Good Lookin' - Blossom Hart and Staff Sgt. Rocky Fulton
- Hey, Good Lookin' (Reprise) - Betty-Jean, Corp. Burns, Girls and Boys
- He's a Right Guy - Blossom Hart
- The Leader of a Big Time Band - Blossom Hart

Act II

- I'm in Love with a Soldier Boy - Mary-Frances, Girls and Boys
- There's a Happy Land in the Sky - Blossom Hart, Chiquita Hart, Harry Hart, Mr. Tobias Twitch and Staff Sgt. Rocky Fulton
- He's a Right Guy (Reprise) - Blossom Hart
- Could It Be You? (Reprise) - Staff Sgt. Rocky Fulton and Ensemble
- By the Mississinewa - Blossom Hart and Chiquita Hart

== Response ==
A LIFE reviewer wrote that the musical was "gay and glittering" and that "from start to finish, the show belongs to the exuberant Ethel Merman".
