= Edna May Wonacott =

American former child actress (1932–2022)

- Born: February 6, 1932; Willits, California, U.S.
- Died: June 26, 2022 (aged 90); Yuma, Arizona, U.S.
- Occupation: Film actress
- Years active: 1943–1952
- Spouse: Robert Green (m. 1951; died 2008)
- Children: 3

Edna May Wonacott (February 6, 1932 – June 26, 2022) was an American child actress, best known for her role as Ann Newton in the 1943 movie Shadow of a Doubt. The director, Alfred Hitchcock, and film producer Jack H. Skirball handpicked the then-nine year old for the film while she was waiting for the bus. At that time she had no experience as an actress.

Wonacott received a seven-year contract and Hitchcock predicted that she would become a star within a year. Other than Shadow of a Doubt, she made minor (uncredited) appearances in several films, including The Bells of St. Mary's and The Model and the Marriage Broker, then retired at age 20.

== Personal life and death ==
Wonacott was the daughter of Mr. and Mrs. Elie Wonacott of Santa Rosa, California. In 1951, she married Robert Royce Green and had three sons. As of 2010, she resided in Yuma, Arizona, under the name Edna Green. She died there in June 2022, at the age of 90.

== Filmography ==
Year	Title	Role	Notes
1943	Shadow of a Doubt	Ann Newton	
1944	Hi, Beautiful	Young Girl	Uncredited
1945	Under Western Skies	Faith	
1945	This Love of Ours	Youngster	Uncredited
1945	The Bells of St. Mary's	Delphine Ford	Uncredited
1951	Sunny Side of the Street	Bobby-Soxer	Uncredited
1951	The Model and the Marriage Broker	2nd Miss Perry	Uncredited
