= Richard D. Adams =

United States Navy admiral (1909–1987)

Richard Donald Adams
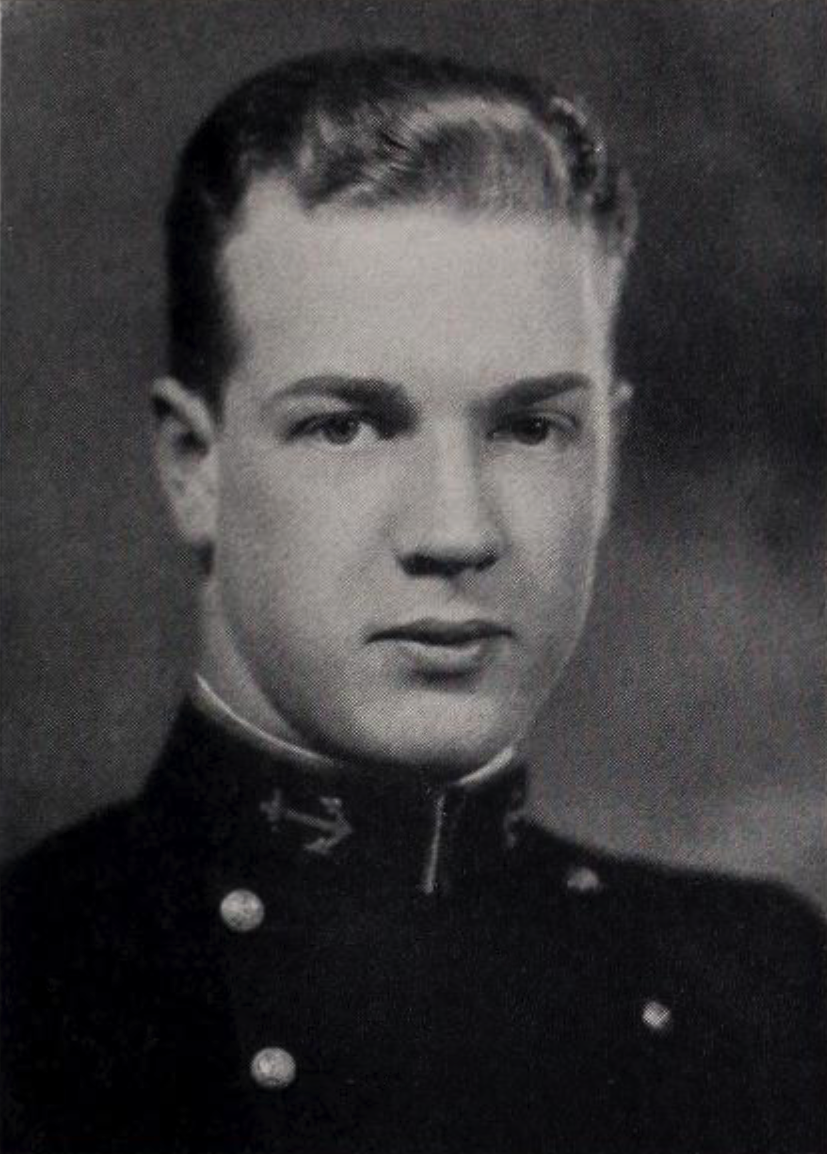
- Born: June 14, 1909; Ambridge, Pennsylvania, U.S.
- Died: September 5, 1987 (aged 78); San Francisco, California, U.S.
- Burial place: Golden Gate National Cemetery
- Education: United States Naval Academy
- Spouse(s): Martha O'Driscoll (m. 1943; div. 1947); Lorene Marjorie Hoffer
- Military career
- Allegiance: United States
- Branch: United States Navy
- Service years: 1932–1965
- Rank: Rear admiral
- Commands: Naval Reserve Sub-Repair Division 12-34; Naval Reserve (Surface) Brigade 12-2; Naval Reserve Group 12-6 (L)
- Conflicts: World War II •Philippines campaign •Battle of Tarawa

Richard Donald Adams (June 14, 1909 – September 5, 1987) was an American officer in the United States Navy who served during World War II, and attained the rank of rear admiral. Adams was also known as the first husband of actress Martha O'Driscoll, with the union ending in a well-publicised divorce.

== Early life ==
Adams was born in Ambridge, Pennsylvania, son of Arthur D. and Mary Adams (née Patterson). After graduating from Ambridge High School in 1927, Adams attended the Bellefonte Academy. In 1929 Adams received his appointment to the United States Naval Academy and graduated with the class of 1932.

== Junior officer ==
After his graduation from Annapolis, Adams was commissioned as an ensign in the United States Navy. Adams spent the first years of his naval career on board the USS Lexington (CV-2) and as an Engineering Officer of USS Sturtevant (DD-240). From June 1934 until August 1935, Adams served as a student aviator at the Naval Air Station in Pensacola, Florida. During this time, Adams met his future wife and actress, 23-year-old Martha O'Driscoll. In 1937, LTJG Adams resigned his commission and received a commission in the Naval Reserve.

After transferring to the Naval Reserve, Adams was employed as an engineer by the National Supply Company, which produced Superior brand Diesel engines. Adams wrote several instruction manuals while employed there. In June 1939, Adams took on employment as a power sales engineer with the Engineering Equipment and Supply Company in Manila, Philippine Islands. In May 1941, he was called to active duty.

== World War II ==
Recalled to active duty, Adams was assigned to the submarine tender USS Otus as engineering officer. The USS Otus was assigned to the Asiatic Fleet in the Philippines. On December 10, 1941, she was slightly damaged when the Japanese conducted an air raid on the Cavite Navy Yard. The USS Otus was then withdrawn from the Philippines. In November 1942, Adams was transferred to the USS Barnes (CVE-20) as an engineering officer. On September 18, 1943, LTCD Adams married Martha O'Driscoll in a ceremony at Beverly Hills, California. In March 1944, LCDR Adams was transferred to the Mare Island Naval Shipyard. He and served there until his release from active duty in February 1946.

== Divorce ==
Adams met Martha O'Driscoll in 1935 while spending time at the O'Driscoll home in Beverly Hills. They were married September 18, 1943 in Beverly Hills and separated several months later. In August 1944, LCDR Adams' mother announced to the newspapers of O'Driscoll's intention to divorce her son. O'Driscoll announced her intention to divorce in January 1945, but because of the Soldiers' and Sailors' Civil Relief Act of 1940 it would be delayed until the end of the war. When Adams was released from active duty in March 1946, he contested the divorce. In March 1947, O'Driscoll established a new residence at the Hotel El Rancho in Las Vegas, Nevada with the intention of filing for divorce a second time. On July 18, 1947, O'Driscoll was granted her divorce from Adams. Less than 48 hours later, O'Driscoll married Navy veteran and Chicago businessman Arthur I. Appleton. At the same time, she announced her intention to retire as an actress.

== Reserve career ==
Adams took command of Naval Reserve Sub-Repair Division 12–34 in September 1950. In April 1953, he received a new assignment as Commanding Officer of Naval Reserve (Surface) Brigade 12–2, at Treasure Island, California. In the summer of 1955, Adams attended the Senior Reserve Officers' course at the Naval War College, Newport, Rhode Island. In March 1956, CDR Adams spent two weeks at the Naval Amphibious Training Unit at Coronado, California. Beginning in July 1956, CDR Adams spent one year on recruiting duty on Treasure Island, California. At the same time, Adams was a Senior Member of the Naval Reserve Policy Board for the 12th Naval District. He was also member and subcommittee chairman and later committee chairman, of the National Naval Reserve Policy Board in Washington, D.C. From January 1958 until June 1963, Adams attended the Naval Reserve Officers School and took courses in public relations, international law, international relations, and guided missiles.

In April 1963, CDR Adams was promoted to rear admiral. After a short time with the Bureau of Naval Personnel, RADM Adams took command of the Naval Reserve Group 12-6 (L) at Treasure Island, California. This placed RADM Adams in command of more than 30 naval divisions. For two weeks in 1963, Adams was placed on active duty as commander of the US Naval Base in New Orleans, Louisiana. In January 1964, RADM Adams reported for duty to support the public relations for the Commandant of the 12th Naval district. Adams retired from the Naval Reserve in 1965.

== Later life ==
Since the war, Adams had been self-employed, being owner of RD Adams Company, San Francisco, engaged in rental and sales of materials handling equipment, and providing inspection services. He was also manager of an exporting firm, Overseas Industrial Services, also in San Francisco.

Rear Admiral Adams was a member of the Navy League, US Naval Reserve Association, the Naval Order of the United States, the American Society of Mechanical Engineers, and the American Society of Naval Engineers. He died September 5, 1987, aged 78, and was interred at Golden Gate National Cemetery.
