= Blonde Alibi =

1946 film

- Theatrical release poster
- Directed by: Will Jason
- Screenplay by: George Bricker
- Story by: Gordon Kahn
- Produced by: George Bricker, Ben Pivar
- Starring: Tom Neal; Martha O'Driscoll; Donald MacBride; Peter Whitney
- Cinematography: Maury Gertsman
- Edited by: Edward Curtiss
- Music by: Edgar Fairchild
- Production company: Universal Pictures
- Distributed by: Universal Pictures (US), General Film Distributors (UK)
- Release date: March 1946
- Running time: 62 minutes
- Country: United States
- Language: English

Blonde Alibi is a 1946 American black-and-white noir thriller directed by Will Jason and starring Tom Neal, Martha O'Driscoll, Donald MacBride, and Peter Whitney.

== Cast ==
- Tom Neal as Rick Lavery
- Martha O'Driscoll as Marian Gale
- Donald MacBride as Insp. Carmichael
- Peter Whitney as Police Lt. Melody Haynes
- Samuel S. Hinds as Prof. Slater
- Robert Armstrong as Williams
- Elisha Cook Jr. as Sam Collins
- Marc Lawrence as Joe DeRita
- Oliver Blake as Pat Tenny
- John Berkes as Louie Comey

== Home media ==
In 2004 the film was released on DVD by Teakwood Video.
