= Under Western Skies (1945 film) =

1945 film

- Theatrical release poster
- Directed by: Jean Yarbrough
- Screenplay by: Stanley Roberts; Clyde Bruckman
- Story by: Stanley Roberts (Original Story)
- Produced by: Warren Wilson
- Starring: Martha O'Driscoll; Noah Beery, Jr.
- Cinematography: Charles Van Enger
- Edited by: Philip Cahn
- Production company: Universal Pictures
- Distributed by: Universal Pictures
- Release date: January 19, 1945
- Running time: 56 minutes
- Country: United States
- Language: English

Under Western Skies is a 1945 American Western musical film directed by Jean Yarbrough and starring Martha O'Driscoll and Noah Beery, Jr. It is set in the fictional town of Rim Rock, Arizona.

== Plot ==
Katie Wells is part of a traveling musical troupe that arrives in town after having been waylayed by local bandit King Carlos Randall who is smitten by the pretty entertainer. Randall and his gang follow the troupe into town and disrupt the show when Sheriff James Whitcolm Wyatt accosts them.

Rim Rock school teacher Tod Howell begins courting Wells, but plans are thwarted when Randall kidnaps Wells. Sheriff Wyatt rescues Wells, and she and Howell are married.

== Cast ==
- Martha O'Driscoll as Katie Wells
- Noah Beery, Jr. as Tod Howell
- Leo Carrillo as King Carlos Randall
- Leon Errol as Willie Wells
- Irving Bacon as Sheriff James Whitcolm Wyatt
- Dorothy Granger – Maybelle Watkins
- Ian Keith as Professor Moffett
- Jennifer Holt as Charity
- Edna May Wonacott as Faith
- Earle Hodgins as Mayor Dave Mayfield
- Al Shaw as Barton Brother Act (as Shaw and Lee)
- Sam Lee as Barton Brother Act (as Shaw and Lee)
- Dorothy Granger as Maybelle
- Jack Rice as Neil Mathews
