= Grady Sutton =

American actor (1906–1995)

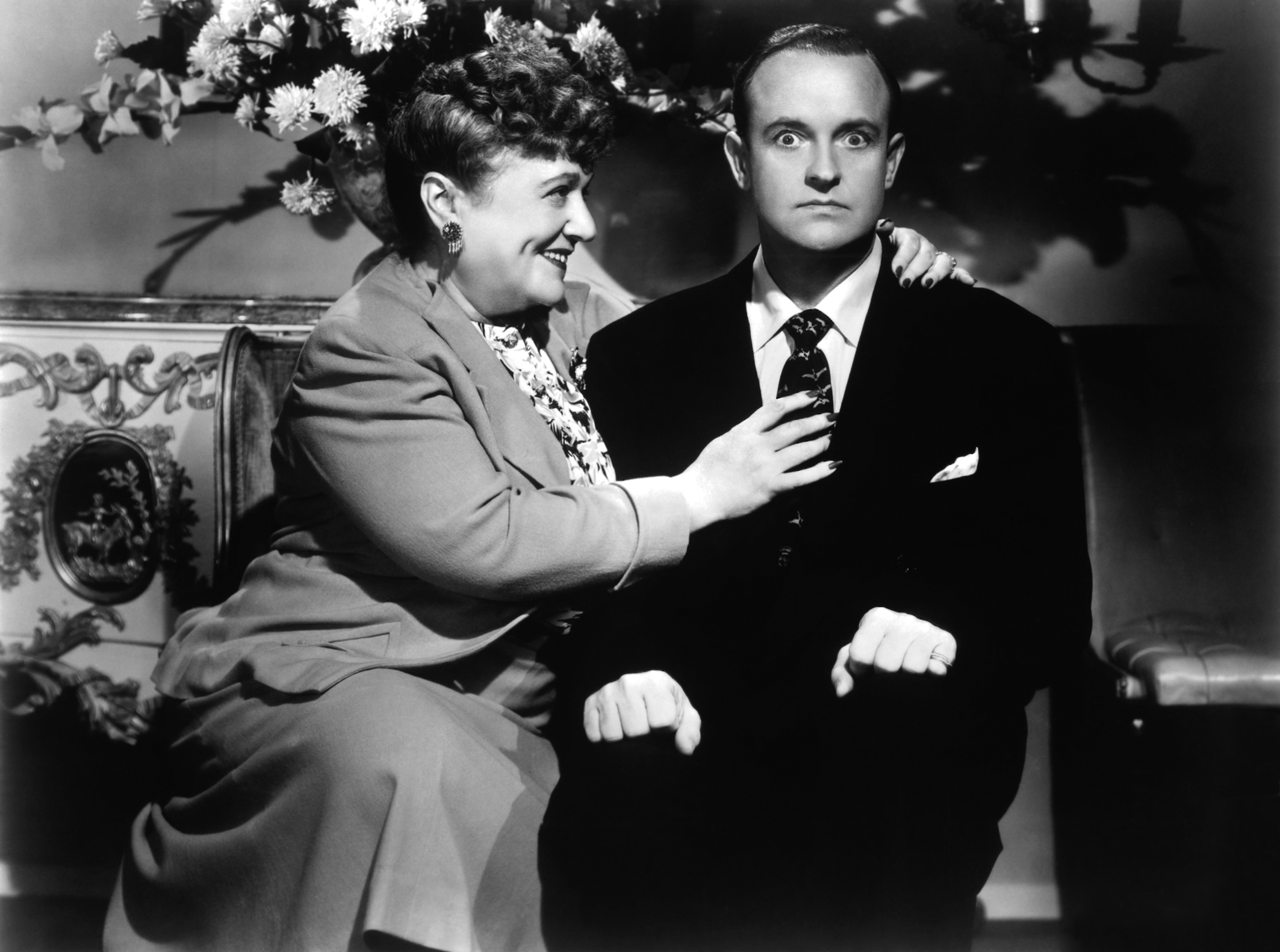
- Florence Bates with Sutton in My Dear Secretary (1948)
- Born: Grady Harwell Sutton; April 5, 1906; Chattanooga, Tennessee, U.S.
- Died: September 17, 1995 (aged 89); Woodland Hills, Los Angeles, California, U.S.
- Occupation: Actor
- Years active: 1925–1979

Grady Harwell Sutton (April 5, 1906 – September 17, 1995) was an American film and television character actor from the 1920s to the 1970s. He appeared in more than 180 films.

== Early years ==
Sutton was born in Chattanooga, Tennessee, the son of Mr. and Mrs. W. P. Sutton. Raised in Florida, he attended St. Petersburg High School, where he was a member of the swimming team.

== Career ==
Sutton began his career during the silent film era and made the transition to sound films with the college themed shorts The Boy Friends. He moved on to countless character roles, where he frequently played dimwitted country boys. His best-known roles were as Frank Dowling, Katharine Hepburn's dancing partner, in Alice Adams (1935) and as a foil to W.C. Fields in four films, The Pharmacist (1933), Man on the Flying Trapeze (1935), You Can't Cheat an Honest Man (1939), and The Bank Dick (1940).

Film historian William J. Mann characterizes Sutton as a typical "Hollywood Sissy"; that is, a homosexual actor who ordinarily portrayed an effeminate character for comedic effect. He didn't reveal that he was gay until much later in his career for fear of being blackballed.

He had a non-speaking cameo as a guest at a formal event in the 1964 film My Fair Lady, in which he mimed some comic schticks. The commentator on the DVD pointed him out and referred to him as "an old W.C. Fields actor".

On television, Sutton appeared in an episode of The Odd Couple, as well as some commercials. He continued to work throughout the 1950s and 1960s, finally retiring from acting in 1979.

== Death ==
On September 17, 1995, Sutton died at the Motion Picture & Television Country House and Hospital in Woodland Hills, California at the age of 89.

== Filmography ==
=== Film ===
Year	Title	Role	Notes
1925	The Mad Whirl	Minor Role	Uncredited
1925	The Freshman	Student who goes to dean	Uncredited; Alternative title: College Days
1926	Skinner's Dress Suit	Party Guest	Uncredited
1926	Brown of Harvard	One of the Dickeys	Uncredited
1926	The Boy Friend		Uncredited
1926	The Whole Town's Talking	Party Guest	Uncredited
1929	Why Be Good?	Guest at Junior's First Party	Uncredited
1929	The Sophomore	Cupie - Freshman Fraternity Brother	Uncredited
1929	Sailor's Holiday	Sailor Extra in Cafe	Uncredited
1929	Welcome Danger	Man at Party	(silent version) (scenes deleted)
1929	So This Is College	Football Spectator	Uncredited
1929	Hit the Deck	Sailor	Uncredited
1930	Wild Company	Anita's Boyfriend	Uncredited
1930	Let's Go Native	Diner	Uncredited
1932	This Reckless Age	Stepladder Schultz	
1932	Movie Crazy	Man afraid of mice	Uncredited
1932	The Age of Consent	Student at Dormitory	Uncredited
1932	Pack Up Your Troubles	the wrong Eddie	
1932	Hot Saturday	Archie	
1933	The Story of Temple Drake	Bob	Uncredited
1933	College Humor	Timid freshman	
1933	Ace of Aces	Party Guest with Newspaper	Uncredited
1933	The Sweetheart of Sigma Chi	Pledge	
1933	Only Yesterday	Charlie Smith, Party Guest	Uncredited
1934	Bachelor Bait	Don Beldon	
1934	Gridiron Flash	Pudge Harrison	
1935	Laddie	Peter Dover	
1935	Stone of Silver Creek	Jimmy	
1935	Born to Gamble	College Man at Senior Prom	Uncredited
1935	Man on the Flying Trapeze	Claude Neselrode	Alternative title: The Memory Expert
1935	Alice Adams	Frank Dowling	
1935	Dr. Socrates	Grocery Store Clerk	Uncredited
1936	The Singing Kid	Young Man	(scenes deleted)
1936	Palm Springs	Bud	
1936	The Crime of Dr. Forbes	Student Doctor	Uncredited
1936	My Man Godfrey	Charlie Van Rumple	Uncredited
1936	King of the Royal Mounted	RCMP Const. Slim Callum	
1936	Valiant Is the Word for Carrie	Mat Burdon	
1936	Pigskin Parade	Mortimer Higgins	
1936	Two Minutes to Play	Hank Durkee	
1937	She's Dangerous	Drunk	Uncredited
1937	Waikiki Wedding	Everett Todhunter	
1937	We Have Our Moments	Clem Porter	
1937	Turn Off the Moon	Truelove Spencer	
1937	Dangerous Holiday	Max	
1937	Behind the Mike	Curly Conway	
1937	Stage Door	Butch	
1937	Love Takes Flight	Donald	
1938	Joy of Living	Florist	Uncredited
1938	Vivacious Lady	Culpepper	
1938	Having Wonderful Time	Gus	Alternative title: Having a Wonderful Time
1938	Three Loves Has Nancy	George Wilkins, Jr.	
1938	The Mad Miss Manton	D.A.'s Secretary	
1938	A Man to Remember	Raymond	Uncredited
1938	Hard to Get	Stanley Potter	
1939	You Can't Cheat an Honest Man	Chester Dalrymple	Uncredited
1939	Blondie Meets the Boss	Camera Store Clerk	Uncredited
1939	Three Smart Girls Grow Up	Clarence, a Guest	Uncredited
1939	They Made Her a Spy	Quiet Man on Train	Uncredited
1939	The Flying Irishman	Clothing Salesman	Uncredited
1939	Blind Alley	Holmes	Uncredited
1939	It's a Wonderful World	Lupton Peabody	
1939	Naughty but Nice	Mr. Mankton	Uncredited
1939	In Name Only	Paul Graham - Escort	Uncredited
1939	The Angels Wash Their Faces	Gildersleeve (Mayor's secretary)	Alternative title: Angels Wash Their Faces
1939	Three Sons	Grimson	
1940	City of Chance	R.O. Champion	Uncredited
1940	Millionaire Playboy	Jerry	Uncredited
1940	Torrid Zone	Sam, Steve's Secretary	
1940	Anne of Windy Poplars	Gibson's Secretary	Uncredited
1940	Millionaires in Prison	Jock, Vander's Nephew	Uncredited
1940	We Who Are Young	New Father	Uncredited
1940	Lucky Partners	Reporter	Uncredited
1940	He Stayed for Breakfast	Salesman	
1940	Sky Murder	Buster - Chris' Boyfriend	Uncredited
1940	Too Many Girls	Football Coach	Uncredited
1940	The Bank Dick	Og Oggleby, Bank Teller	
1941	Mr. District Attorney	Hat Salesman	Uncredited
1941	She Knew All the Answers	Ogleby	
1941	Hurry, Charlie, Hurry	Dore Dare, a Tailor	Uncredited
1941	Blondie in Society	Doghouse Salesman	Uncredited
1941	Flying Blind	Chester Gimble	
1941	Father Takes a Wife	Tailor	
1941	Doctors Don't Tell	Dr. Piper	
1941	You Belong to Me	Department Store Clerk	Uncredited
1941	Three Girls About Town	Meeting Doorman	Uncredited
1941	Cadet Girl	Elmer - Train Passenger	Uncredited
1941	Bedtime Story	Bert, Fashion Designer	Uncredited
1942	Four Jacks and a Jill	Nightclub Patron	Uncredited
1942	The Bashful Bachelor	Cedric Wiehunt	
1942	Whispering Ghosts	Jonathan Flack	
1942	The Affairs of Martha	Justin I. Peacock, Jr	
1942	Somewhere I'll Find You	Man in Private Dining Room	Uncredited
1943	The More the Merrier	Diner server	Uncredited
1943	Young Ideas	Minor Role	
1943	A Lady Takes a Chance	Malcolm Scott	Alternative title: The Cowboy and the Girl
1943	What a Woman	Mr. Clark	Alternative title: The Beautiful Cheat
1944	Week-End Pass	Pajama Man	
1944	Nine Girls	Photographer	
1944	Since You Went Away	Soldier Hunting for Susie Fleming	Uncredited
1944	Johnny Doesn't Live Here Anymore	George	
1944	The Great Moment	Homer Quimby	
1944	Allergic to Love	Cuthbert	
1944	Casanova Brown	Tod	Uncredited
1944	Goin' to Town	Cedric	
1944	Hi, Beautiful	Attendant	
1945	Grissly's Millions	Robert Palmor Jr.	
1945	Her Lucky Night	Joe	
1945	Salty O'Rourke	Floorwalker	Uncredited
1945	A Royal Scandal	Boris	Uncredited
1945	Brewster's Millions	Packard - Costume Designer	Uncredited
1945	Pillow to Post	Alex, Coast Oil Flunky	Uncredited
1945	Three's a Crowd	Willy Davaney	
1945	Captain Eddie	Lester Thomas	
1945	A Bell for Adano	Pfc. Edward - Algiers Mail Clerk	Uncredited
1945	On Stage Everybody	Cathcart	Uncredited
1945	Anchors Aweigh	Bertram Kraler - Susan's beau	
1945	Guest Wife	Joe's Admirer	Uncredited
1945	Ziegfeld Follies	Texan ('Number Please')	Uncredited
1945	Song of the Prairie	William Van Welby	
1945	She Went to the Races	Hotel Clerk	Uncredited
1945	Sing Your Way Home	Book Shop Proprietor	Uncredited
1945	Hit the Hay	Wilbur Whittlesey	
1945	The Stork Club	Peter - Salesman	Uncredited
1946	Idea Girl	Percy Witherspoon	Uncredited
1946	Partners in Time	Cedric Weehunt / Caleb Weehunt	
1946	Dragonwyck	Astor House clerk	Uncredited
1946	Two Sisters from Boston	Recital Guest	Uncredited
1946	Holiday in Mexico	Tom, Iturbi's Assistant	Uncredited
1946	It's Great to Be Young	Ambrose Kenton	Uncredited
1946	No Leave, No Love	Hat Salesman	Uncredited
1946	Nobody Lives Forever	Horace	Uncredited
1946	The Magnificent Rogue	George Sheffield	
1946	Plainsman and the Lady	Male Secretary	Uncredited
1946	My Dog Shep	John H. Latham	
1946	Susie Steps Out	Dixon	
1946	The Fabulous Suzanne	Marstenson	
1946	The Show-Off	Mr. Hotchkiss	Uncredited
1947	Beat the Band	Harold	
1947	Philo Vance's Gamble	Mr. Willetts	
1947	Love and Learn	Pedestrian Against Divorce	Uncredited
1947	Always Together	Jack, the Soda Jerk	Uncredited
1947	My Wild Irish Rose	Brown	
1948	Romance on the High Seas	Ship Radio operator	Uncredited; Alternative title: It's Magic
1948	My Dear Secretary	Sylvan Scott	
1948	Jiggs and Maggie in Court	Mr. Twiddle	
1948	Last of the Wild Horses	Curly, the cook	
1948	Daily Double	Ulysses the waiter	Short film
1949	Grand Canyon	Halfnote	
1949	Air Hostess	Ned Jenkins	
1954	Living It Up	Gift Shop Owner	Uncredited
1954	A Star Is Born	Artie Carver	Uncredited
1954	White Christmas	Mr. Herring	Uncredited
1955	The Naked Dawn	Cabaret Brawler	Uncredited
1961	Madison Avenue	Dilbock	Uncredited
1962	Billy Rose's Jumbo	Driver	
1962	The Chapman Report	Simon	Uncredited
1963	Come Blow Your Horn	Clothing Store Manager	Uncredited
1963	4 for Texas	Bank Clerk	
1964	My Fair Lady	Ascot Extra / Guest at Ball	Uncredited
1965	Tickle Me	Mr. Dabney	
1965	The Bounty Killer	Minister	
1966	The Chase	Mr. Siftifieus	Uncredited
1966	Paradise, Hawaiian Style	Mr. Cubberson	
1968	Star!	First Salesman at Cartier's	Uncredited
1968	I Love You, Alice B. Toklas!	Funeral Director	Alternative title: Kiss My Butterfly
1970	The Great Bank Robbery	Rev. Simms	
1970	Myra Breckinridge	Kid Barlow	
1970	Suppose They Gave a War and Nobody Came	Rev. Dinwood	
1970	Dirty Dingus Magee	Corporal	Uncredited
1971	Support Your Local Gunfighter	Storekeeper	
1979	Rock 'n' Roll High School	School Board President	(final film role)

=== Television ===
Year	Title	Role	Notes
1952	Studio One	Mr. Caslon	1 episode
1954	I Married Joan	Newsroom Walk Through	1 episode
1954	Dear Phoebe	Store Manager	1 episode
1955	Waterfront	Ramsdale	1 episode
1955	Stage 7	Blonde's Companion / Desk Clerk	2 episodes
1955	The Milton Berle Show	Harold Helot	1 episode
1955–56	The Adventures of Ozzie and Harriet	Mr. Van Buskirk / The Photographer	2 episodes
1956	The Life and Legend of Wyatt Earp	Store Clerk	1 episode
1957	Code 3	Ray Pence	1 episode
1960	The Ann Sothern Show	Swann	2 episodes
1960	Shirley Temple's Storybook	Simon	1 episode
1960	Death Valley Days	Joe Shelton	1 episode
1960	Sugarfoot	Charles	1 episode
1960–62	Lawman	Stiles / Ben Toomey	13 episodes
1961	Cheyenne	Photographer	1 episode
1961	Rawhide	Desk Clerk	1 episode
1961–62	Father of the Bride	Oscar	2 episodes
1962	77 Sunset Strip	Doorman	1 episode
1962	General Electric Theater	The Questioner	1 episode
1963	Dennis the Menace	Alvin Jessup	1 episode
1964	Dr. Kildare	Christopher Blair	1 episode
1964	Mickey	Mr. Freebish	1 episode
1965	Burke's Law	Hubie	1 episode
1965	Petticoat Junction	Chef	1 episode
1966	The Red Skelton Hour	Torture Device Customer	1 episode
1966–67	The Pruitts of Southampton	Sturgis	11 episodes
1967	Batman	Irving Cash	1 episode
1972	Hawaii Five-O	Minister	1 episode
1974	The Odd Couple	Pops Belkin	1 episode
