= Martha O'Driscoll =

American actress (1922–1998)

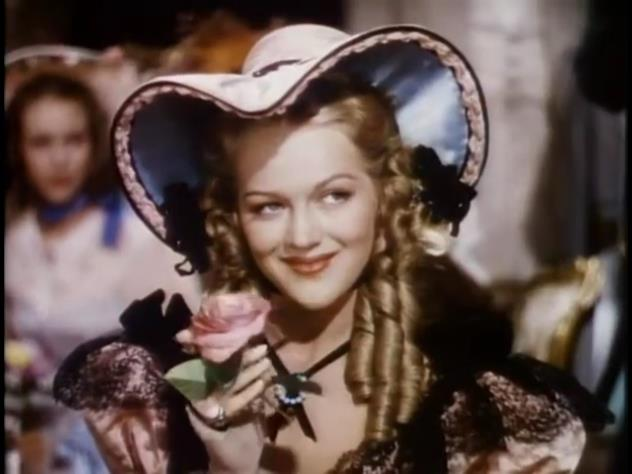
- O'Driscoll in Cecil B. DeMille's Reap the Wild Wind (1942)
- Born: March 5, 1922
- Died: November 3, 1998 (aged 76); Ocala, Florida, U.S.
- Occupations: Actress; dancer; socialite
- Years active: 1936–1947
- Spouses: Richard D. Adams (m. 1943; div. 1947) Arthur I. Appleton (m. 1947)
- Children: 4

Martha O'Driscoll (March 5, 1922 – November 3, 1998) was an American film actress from 1937 until 1947. She retired in 1947 after marrying her second husband, Arthur I. Appleton, president of Appleton Electric Company in Chicago.

== Early life ==
O'Driscoll's mother was a financial partner in the Mar-Ken Professional Children's School, Hollywood, Los Angeles. The school's director, Mrs. Bessire, had a son, William Kent Bessire. The two women decided to name the school after their children—Mar came from Martha and Ken from Kent. The school remained open until the early 1960s.

== Career ==
Trained in singing and dancing, O'Driscoll was seen by choreographer Hermes Pan in a local theater production in Phoenix; Pan suggested to her mother that O'Driscoll might do well in movies. Her mother and she moved to Hollywood in 1935, but Pan was out of town, so they answered an advertisement for dancers. O'Driscoll was given a role in Collegiate (1935), a musical in which Betty Grable had an early leading role.

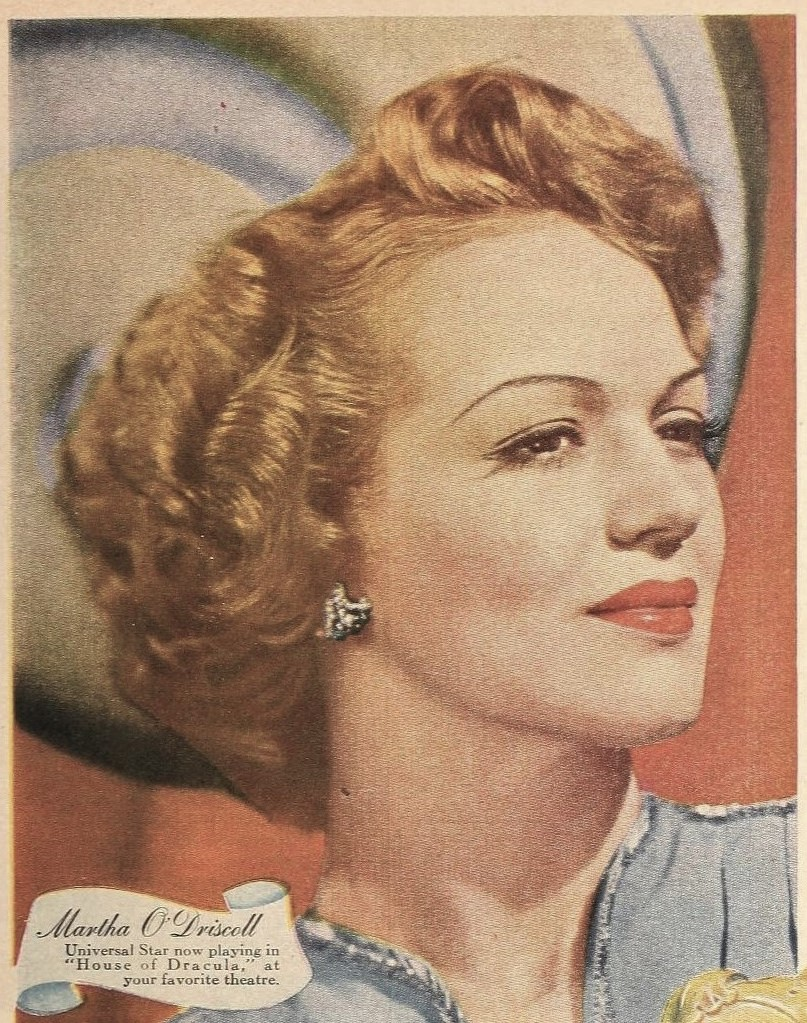
O'Driscoll in 1946

O'Driscoll was given more visible parts and began pitching products in magazine advertisements for Max Factor and Royal Crown Cola, among many others. These ads also promoted her upcoming pictures. She had other small dancing roles in Here Comes the Band, The Big Broadcast of 1936, and The Great Ziegfeld. In the last, she was spotted by a Universal talent scout, who arranged for her to have a screen test, followed by a contract. Her roles were initially small; in her first Universal film, She's Dangerous (1937), she was not credited by name. In the Deanna Durbin vehicle Mad About Music (1937), she was billed as "Pretty Girl". Her face appeared on such advertisements as Charm-Kurl Supreme Cold Wave and Max Factor Hollywood Face Powder. Universal lent O'Driscoll to MGM for parts in The Secret of Dr Kildare (1939) and Judge Hardy and Son (1940), starring Mickey Rooney.

RKO, however, gave O'Driscoll her first two starring roles, as romantic interest to the cowboy Tim Holt in Wagon Train (1940) and notably as Daisy Mae in the first screen version of Al Capp's popular comic strip Li'l Abner (1940), which also featured Buster Keaton.

Paramount became interested in the actress and acquired her contract, casting her first as a maid in Preston Sturges's classic comedy, The Lady Eve (1941). Later, she appeared in Cecil B. DeMille's Reap the Wild Wind (1942). DeMille was too busy filming to appear at Grauman's Theater to plant his prints in concrete for the Walk of Fame, so instead they brought concrete in a mold to him. O'Driscoll, along with Hedda Hopper and Sid Grauman, were photographed at his side during that moment.

O'Driscoll was then given the lead in the B film Pacific Blackout (1942), starring Robert Preston. The actress followed this with a role in Young and Willing (1943). The studio lent her back to Universal, which cast her in Olsen and Johnson's Crazy House (1943), then to RKO for Richard Wallace's stylish thriller, The Fallen Sparrow (1943) with Maureen O'Hara.

In the early 1940s, O'Driscoll toured with Errol Flynn and the USO, performing for the troops all over the world.

O'Driscoll co-starred with Noah Beery Jr., in five films. She also starred in the cult classic House of Dracula with Lon Chaney Jr., and John Carradine; and in Week-End Pass (both 1945). The following year, she made her last Universal film, Blonde Alibi, receiving top billing as a girl who sets out to prove her lover (Tom Neal) innocent of murder. Her last film was Edgar G. Ulmer's Carnegie Hall (1947).

== Personal life ==
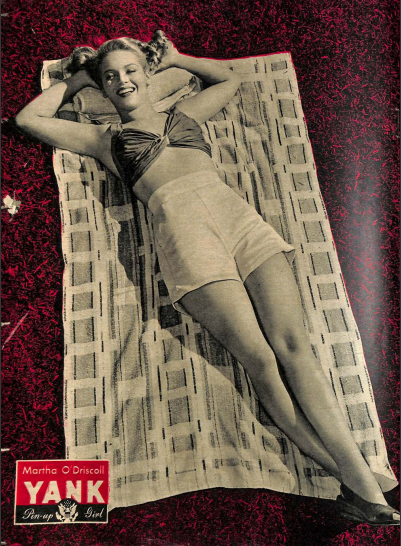
Pin-up photo of O'Driscoll for Yank, the Army Weekly in 1944

Lieutenant Commander Richard D. Adams (U.S. Navy) met O'Driscoll in 1935 while spending time at the O'Driscoll home in Beverly Hills. They were married September 18, 1943 in Beverly Hills and separated ten months later. In August 1944, Adams' mother announced to the newspapers of O'Driscoll's intention to divorce her son. O'Driscoll announced her intention to divorce in January 1945, but because of the Soldiers' and Sailors' Civil Relief Act of 1940 it would be delayed until the end of the war. When Adams was released from active duty in March 1946, he contested the divorce. In March 1947, O'Driscoll established a new residence at the Hotel El Rancho in Las Vegas, Nevada with the intention of filing for divorce a second time. On July 18, 1947, O'Driscoll was granted her divorce from Adams. O'Driscoll then married Navy veteran and Chicago businessman Arthur I. Appleton, president of the Appleton Electric Company, founded by his father. At the same time, she announced her intention to retire as an actress. The couple had four children: James, John, Linda, and William.

O'Driscoll served as an officer in such Chicago-based organizations as the Sarah Siddons Society, the Ways and Means Committee of Chicago's Junior League, and the Women's Board of the Chicago Boys' Clubs; she was also treasurer of the World's Adoption International Fund. In the 1980s and 1990s, she was a guest speaker at numerous movie-nostalgia conventions.

In 1976, the Appletons started Bridlewood Farm, a thoroughbred breeding, training and racing farm located in Ocala, Florida. Recognized as Florida Breeder of the Year in 1991, Appleton's farm bred, raised and trained some 100 stakes winners, including 12 grade one winners. Among them are Florida-bred millionaires Jolie's Halo, Super Nakayama, Forbidden Apple, Southern Image, David Junior, Wild Event, Eden's Storm, Black Bar Spin and In Summation. Florida-bred Horse of the Year honors went to Forbidden Apple in 2001 and In Summation in 2004. Among the most high-profile horses to first train at Bridlewood Farm was Smarty Jones, winner of the 2004 Kentucky Derby-G1, Belmont Stakes-G1 and 2004 Champion 3-year-old Colt.

The Appletons split their time between a home on Northbrook, Illinois, the farm in Ocala, and an estate on exclusive Indian Creek Island in Miami-Dade.

In 1984, the Appletons built and took delivery of a 138-foot (42 m) Feadship yacht, also named Bridlewood. The Appletons also had two aircraft, Top Mama One and Top Mama Two.

In 1984, the couple, along with Arthur Appleton's sister, Edith, built the Appleton Museum of Art in Ocala.

After retirement, O'Driscoll and Appleton spent the remainder of their years between their home in Chicago, Bridlewood Farm, and their home near Miami on Indian Creek Island.

O'Driscoll died on November 3, 1998, aged 76, in Indian Creek.

== Partial filmography ==
- Three Cheers for Love (1936) .... Chorine (uncredited)
- She's Dangerous (1937) .... Blonde Girl (uncredited)
- Mad About Music (1938) .... Pretty Girl (uncredited)
- Girls' School (1938) .... Grace
- The Secret of Dr. Kildare (1939) .... Mrs. Roberts
- Judge Hardy and Son (1939) .... Leonora V. 'Elvie' Horton
- Laddie (1940) .... Sally Pryor
- Forty Little Mothers (1940) .... Janette
- Wagon Train (1940) .... Helen Lee
- Li'l Abner (1940) .... Daisy Mae Scraggs
- The Lady Eve (1941) .... Martha
- Her First Beau (1941) .... Julie Harris
- Henry Aldrich for President (1941) .... Mary Aldrich
- Pacific Blackout (1941) .... Mary Jones
- The Remarkable Andrew (1942) .... Beamish's secretary
- Reap the Wild Wind (1942) .... Ivy Devereaux
- Youth on Parade (1942) .... Sally Carlyle
- My Heart Belongs to Daddy (1942) .... Joyce Whitman
- Young and Willing (1943) .... Dottie Coburn
- Paramount Victory Short No. T2-4: The Aldrich Family Gets in the Scrap (1943, Short) .... Mary Aldrich
- We've Never Been Licked (1943) .... Deede Dunham
- The Fallen Sparrow (1943) .... Whitney 'The Imp' Parker
- Crazy House (1943) .... Marjorie Nelson, alias Marjorie Wyndingham
- Week-End Pass (1944) .... Barbara 'Babs' Bradley aka Barbara Lake
- Prices Unlimited (1944, Short)
- Follow the Boys (1944) .... Martha O'Driscoll
- Ghost Catchers (1944) .... Susanna Marshall
- Allergic to Love (1944) .... Pat Bradley
- Hi, Beautiful (1944) .... Patty Callahan
- Under Western Skies (1945) .... Katie Wells
- Here Come the Co-Eds (1945) .... Molly McCarthy
- Her Lucky Night (1945) .... Connie
- Shady Lady (1945) .... Gloria Wendell
- The Daltons Ride Again (1945) .... Mary Bohannon
- House of Dracula (1945) .... Miliza Morrelle
- Blonde Alibi (1946) .... Marian Gale
- Down Missouri Way (1946) .... Jane Colwell
- Criminal Court (1946) .... Georgia Gale
- Carnegie Hall (1947) .... Ruth Haines (final film role)
