= Pacific Blackout =

1941 film by Ralph Murphy

- Directed by: Ralph Murphy
- Written by: Franz Schulz; Curt Siodmak; Lester Cole
- Produced by: Sol C. Siegel
- Starring: Robert Preston; Eva Gabor; Martha O'Driscoll
- Cinematography: Theodor Sparkuhl
- Edited by: Thomas Scott
- Music by: Gerard Carbonara
- Production company: Paramount Pictures
- Distributed by: Paramount Pictures
- Release date: December 31, 1941
- Running time: 76 minutes
- Country: United States
- Language: English

Pacific Blackout is a 1941 American mystery thriller film directed by Ralph Murphy and starring Robert Preston, Eva Gabor and Martha O'Driscoll. It was produced and distributed by Paramount Pictures.

== Plot ==
Inventor and engineer Robert Draper is unjustly convicted for the murder of his partner. Just as he is being sent to prison, the prison truck crashes in the midst of a civil defense blackout, propelling him into a search for the real killers who framed him. Czech-American screenwriter Franz Schulz was billed as Francis Spencer for the film.

== Cast ==
- Robert Preston as Robert Draper
- Martha O'Driscoll as Mary Jones
- Philip Merivale as John Runnell
- Eva Gabor as Marie Duval
- Louis Jean Heydt as Harold Kermin
- Thurston Hall as Williams, Civil Defense Official
- Mary Treen as Irene
- J. Edward Bromberg as Pickpocket
- Spencer Charters as Cornelius
- Cy Kendall as Hotel Clerk
- Russell Hicks as Commanding Officer
- Paul Stanton as Judge
- Clem Bevans as Night-watchman
- Robert Emmett Keane as Defense Attorney
- Edwin Maxwell as District attorney
- Rod Cameron as Pilot
- unbilled players include John Banner, Monte Blue, Wade Boteler, Ralph Dunn, Bess Flowers, Jack Norton, Betty Farrington and Lee Shumway

== Bibliography ==
- Parish, James & Robert & Pitts, Michael R. The Great Spy Pictures. Scarecrow Press, 1974.
