= Appleton Museum of Art =

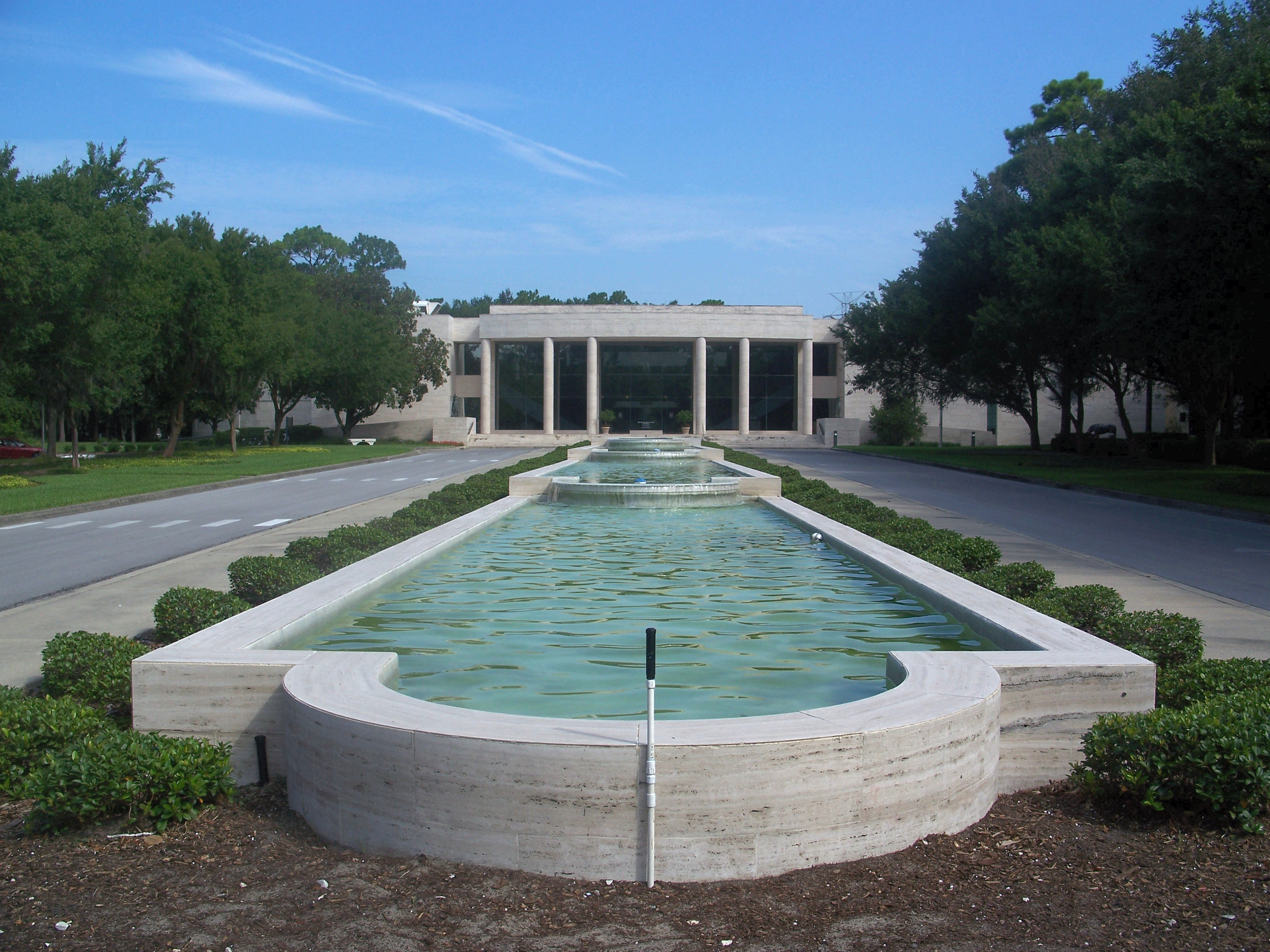

- Location within Florida
- Established: 1987
- Location: 4333 East Silver Springs Boulevard; Ocala, Florida
- Coordinates: 29.205349°N 82.076497°W
- Type: Art museum
- Director: Jason Steuber
- Website: www.appletonmuseum.org

The Appleton Museum of Art is an art museum in Ocala, Florida, United States. It has affiliated and administered by the College of Central Florida since 2004.

The Appleton Museum of Art houses a permanent collection of more than 24,000 works including art and artifacts representative of European, American, Asian, African, Contemporary and pre-Columbian styles. It also displays special exhibits on a temporary basis throughout the year. The museum collects works specifically from Florida artists and showcases history and progression of Central Florida culture.

== History ==
Business magnate Arthur I. Appleton and his wife, the former Martha O'Driscoll bought land in the Ocala area during the mid-1970s and established Bridlewood Farm, a thoroughbred breeding and training facility. Construction of the Appleton Museum of Art began in 1984 on 44 acres of forested land on East Silver Springs Boulevard in 1984. Under the guidance of Mr. Appleton and Museum Director, Moussa Domit, the building opened to the public in 1987 as the Appleton Museum of Art. Built by more than 300 tradesmen from 130 companies, the museum is clad in 80,000 square feet of Italian travertine marble and the flooring consists of 15,000 square feet of Bolivian Capao Bonito granite. The marble and stone work was done by Antagon/Paleni of Montreal and the glass came from Pilkington Glass of England.

The Edith-Marie Appleton Wing, funded by and named after Arthur I. Appleton's sister, was built in 1996, and a 2,662-square-foot art storage facility was added in 2009, bringing the museum's total size to just under 82,000 square feet.

In 2013, the Appleton Museum of Art earned accreditation by the American Alliance of Museums and achieved reaccreditation in 2023.

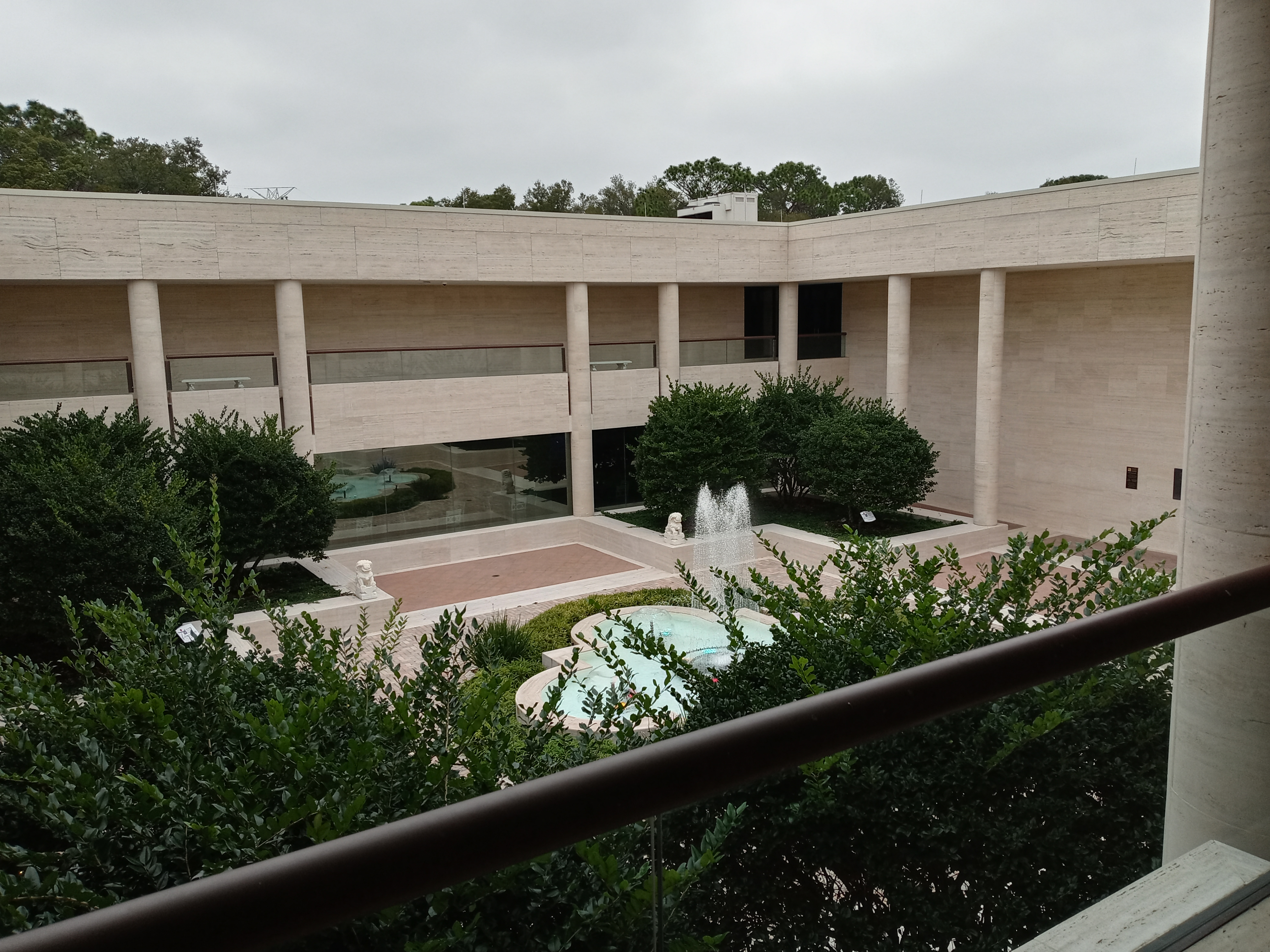
Appleton Museum of Art's open-air courtyard, as viewed from a second story balcony.

== Museum Features ==
The Appleton Art Museum is located within the Appleton Cultural Center, a complex east of the city's downtown area, which it shares with the Ocala Civic Theatre. The two-story travertine marble building is surrounded by a fountain and a long reflecting pool, and the surrounding landscaped grounds span 11.3 acres.

The Appleton Museum of Art's interior features include six art galleries, totaling several thousand square feet, and a 250-seat auditorium and cafe surrounding an open-air courtyard.

Additionally, the Edith-Marie Appleton Wing includes the Artspace, a family makerspace, the Clay Lab with 11 pottery wheels, and the Art Lab, another studio art classroom.

== Collections ==
The Appleton Museum is home to eight permanent art collections, spanning multiple time periods and themes, and temporary exhibitions that rotate in and out of the museum periodically.

=== Permanent Collections ===
==== Florida Artists ====
One of the missions of the Appleton Museum of Art is to support local Florida artists by collecting and displaying their artworks. This mission is made possible with the help of sponsors such as the Ina Gotler-Colen and Gladys Shafran Kashdin Endowed Acquisitions Fund for Florida Artists and the David and Lisa Midgett Foundation.

==== Equine Art ====
The town that the Appleton Museum of Art was built in, Ocala, Florida, is lauded as the Horse Capital of the World, and as Ocala is known for both its horse farms and its equestrian centers, it is no surprise that the Appleton Museum wanted to showcase its history with horses by making one of its permanent collections an homage to Ocala's equestrian legacy. After all, when Arthur I. Appleton and his wife first bought property in Ocala, they built and established a horse farm by the name of Bridlewood Farm. The Equine collection represents over 3,000 years of equine history from around the world, from Eurasian Steppe Bronze Age horse-bridle bits to more contemporary works.

==== European Art ====
Covering a wide variety of European art, the European collection spans the 17th through the 19th centuries, and includes artworks from many different mediums, including painting, sculpture, and decorative arts. The artworks in this collection cover various artistic movements, such as Romanticism, Post-Romanticism, Realism, Orientalism, and the pre-Raphaelites, and come from such European nations as: France, Italy, the Netherlands, Russia, Great Britain, and Germany.

==== Pre-Columbian Art ====
This collection of art focuses on artifacts from the Pre-Columbian Era in the Americas. The objects in this collection were created by indigenous peoples from Mexico, Central America, and South America prior to any significant influence from Europeans. This collection includes artwork and artifacts from such cultures as the Maya, Wari, Moche, Veracruz, and Chimú. The objects available for viewing in this collection include ceramics, bowls, items made from gold and precious jade, statues, effigies, and censers.

==== Asian Art ====
The Asian Art exhibit is one of the largest collections at the Appleton, and includes religious and secular works from across Asia. Art depicting Buddha come in the form of sculptures and textiles from India, Tibet, Thailand, and Myanmar (formerly Burma). There are a number of historical Chinese artifacts, including ceramic pieces of Tang Dynasty horse and guardian figures, rare celadon funerary vases, and Chinese Export Ware, which were made in China exclusively for export to western nations in a time when Orientalism was very popular in western culture. There are also a variety of art and artifacts originating in Japan, including a variety of miniature sculptures called netsukes, Meji era bronzes, and kimonos.

==== African Art ====
Much of the art in this collection was purchased by Arthur I. Appleton from the collection of Dr. Victor David DuBois after DuBois's death. Dubois built his collection of African Art during his years working for the United States Government in Africa. Most of the pieces in this collection represent West African cultures, and many were obtained by Dubois directly from the people who made and used them. One notable piece from the collection is a 20th century Dance Headdress with Hare Crest, called a Sibondël, created and used by the Baga people of the Republic of Guinea. Another notable piece is a full set of Maiden Spirit Dance Regalia, from the Agbogo Mmuo (also spelled, Agbogho Mmuo), which is the Maiden Spirit Dance of the Igbo people of Nigeria.

==== Modern and Contemporary Art ====
This collection features works of both Modern art and the Contemporary art, focusing on artwork from the 1950s to present day. The artwork in this collection include paintings, sculptures, photography, and drawings, and features pieces by such notable artists as: Salvador Dali, Andy Warhol, and Takao Tanabe.

==== Maritime Art ====
The art in this collection features various depictions of the sea and humans' interactions with the sea, focusing mostly on paintings of historic sailing ships, and models of historic sailing ships. These pieces of art were created mostly during the 19th and 20th centuries, and were collected by Arthur I. Appleton, who served in the United States Navy during World War II. This collection features artwork by British artists William Adolphus Knell, Captain Richard Brydges Beechey, Henry Scott, and Montague Dawson.

== Represented artists ==
The following artists, among others, have art displayed in the museum.

- Karel Appel
- John James Audubon
- Antoine-Louis Barye
- Ralph Albert Blakelock
- William-Adolphe Bouguereau
- Jules Breton
- Alexander Calder
- Jean-Baptiste Carpeaux
- Albert-Ernest Carrier-Belleuse
- Thomas Couture
- Pierre Auguste Cot
- Barent Fabritius
- Emile Galle
- Elizabeth Jane Gardner
- Jean-Léon Gérôme
- Robert Gordy
- Ralph Hurst
- Charles Jacque
- Nicolaes Maes
- Mario Nuzzi
- Claes Oldenberg
- Philip Pearlstein
- Robert Rauschenberg
- Auguste Rodin
- Severin Roesen
- James Rosenquist
- Henri Rousseau
- Joseph van Severdonck
- Thomas Sully
- Takao Tanabe
- Louis Comfort Tiffany
- Joe Tilson
- James Abbott McNeill Whistler
