= Week-End Pass =

1944 American film

- Theatrical release poster
- Directed by: Jean Yarbrough
- Screenplay by: Clyde Bruckman
- Story by: Warren Wilson
- Produced by: Warren Wilson
- Starring: Martha O'Driscoll; Noah Beery Jr. George Barbier; Andrew Tombes; Irving Bacon; Dennis Moore
- Cinematography: William A. Sickner
- Edited by: Edward Curtiss
- Production company: Universal Pictures
- Distributed by: Universal Pictures
- Release date: February 14, 1944
- Running time: 65 minutes
- Country: United States
- Language: English

Week-End Pass is a 1944 American comedy film directed by Jean Yarbrough and written by Clyde Bruckman. The film stars Martha O'Driscoll, Noah Beery Jr., George Barbier, Andrew Tombes, Irving Bacon and Dennis Moore. The film was released on February 14, 1944, by Universal Pictures.

== Cast ==
- Martha O'Driscoll as Barbara 'Babs' Bradley / Barbara Lake
- Noah Beery Jr. as Johnny Adams
- George Barbier as Commander 'Pops' Bradley
- Andrew Tombes as Constable
- Irving Bacon as Sheriff Todd
- Dennis Moore as Ray
- Edgar Dearing as Motor Cop
- Pierre Watkin as John James 'J.J.' Kendall
- Lotte Stein as Hilda
- Eddie Acuff as Waikowsky
- Jack Rice as Jenkins
- Perc Launders as Murphy
- The Delta Rhythm Boys as Themselves
- Lew Diamond as himself
- Mayris Chaney as himself
- Bill Shawn as himself
- Grady Sutton as Pajama Man
- Carol Hughes as Maisie
