= Shadow of a Doubt =

1943 film by Alfred Hitchcock

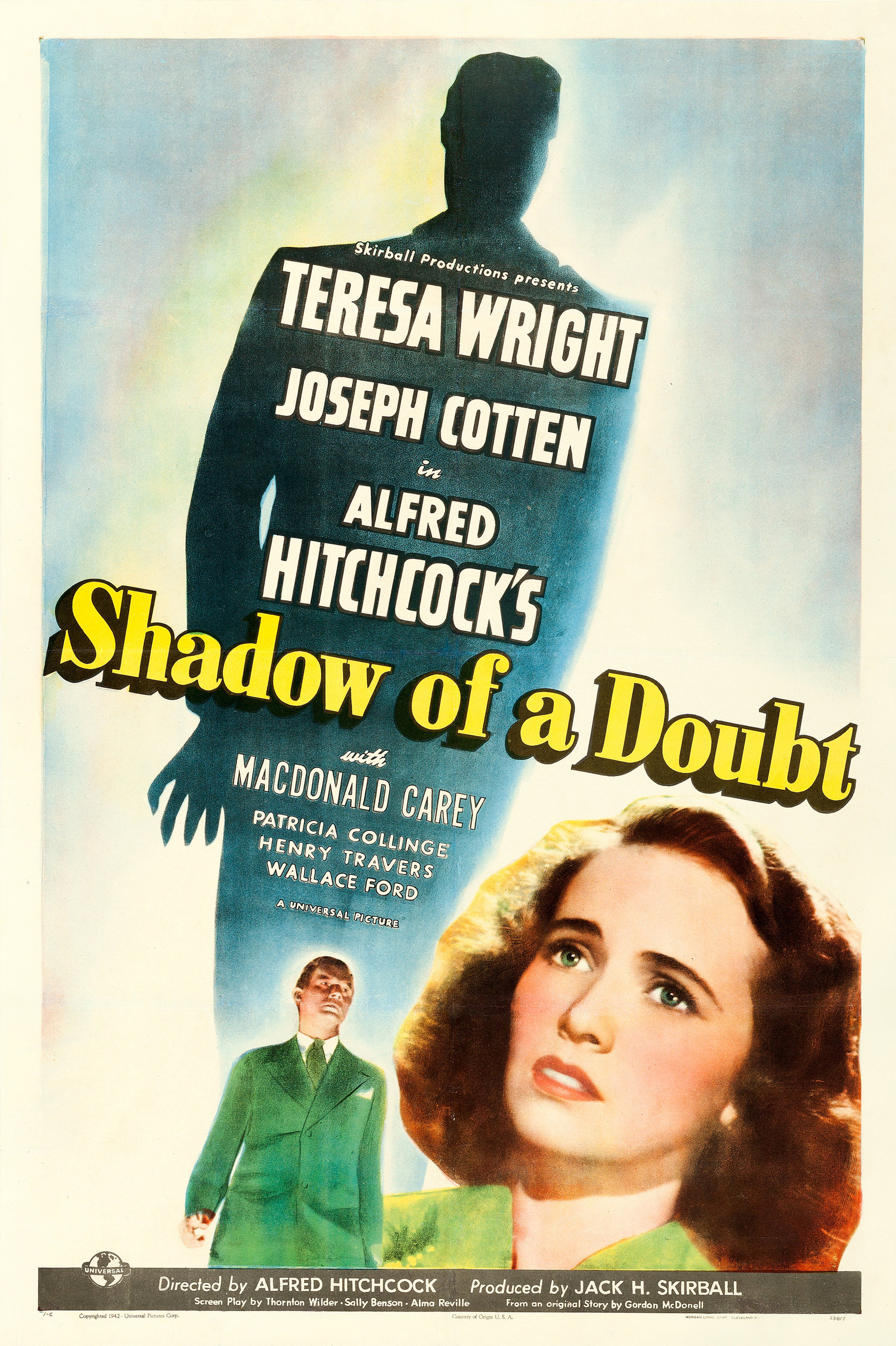
- Theatrical release poster, Style C
- Directed by: Alfred Hitchcock
- Screenplay by: Thornton Wilder; Sally Benson; Alma Reville
- Story by: Gordon McDonell
- Produced by: Jack H. Skirball
- Starring: Teresa Wright; Joseph Cotten; Macdonald Carey; Patricia Collinge; Henry Travers; Wallace Ford
- Cinematography: Joseph A. Valentine
- Edited by: Milton Carruth
- Music by: Dimitri Tiomkin (original); Franz Lehár
- Production company: Skirball Productions
- Distributed by: Universal Pictures
- Release date: January 12, 1943
- Running time: 108 minutes
- Country: United States
- Language: English
- Box office: $1.2 million (U.S. rentals)

Shadow of a Doubt is a 1943 American psychological thriller film noir directed by Alfred Hitchcock, and starring Teresa Wright and Joseph Cotten. Written by Thornton Wilder, Sally Benson, and Alma Reville, the film was nominated for an Academy Award for Best Story for Gordon McDonell.

The story follows Charlotte "Charlie" Newton and her family who live in very quiet Santa Rosa, California. An unexpected visit by Charles Oakley, her charming and sophisticated Uncle Charlie, brings much excitement to the family and the small town. That excitement turns to fear as young Charlie slowly begins to suspect that her uncle may be concealing a dark secret.

When asked by critics as to an overarching theme for the film Hitchcock responded: "Love and good order is no defense against evil".

In 1991, the film was selected for preservation in the United States National Film Registry by the Library of Congress, being deemed "culturally, historically, or aesthetically significant". Hitchcock's favorite of all his films, Shadow of a Doubt was also the one he enjoyed making the most.

== Plot ==
Charles Oakley spots two detectives outside his Newark, New Jersey, hotel room and gives them the slip. He telegraphs his sister Emma Newton in Santa Rosa, California, to let her know he will visit. His niece Charlotte "Charlie" Newton is thrilled by the prospect, seeing it as a welcome break from the family's tedious routine. Uncle Charlie arrives bearing extravagant gifts for everyone, including an emerald ring for his niece. Young Charlie notices the ring is engraved with someone else's initials.

Two men, Jack Graham and Fred Saunders, appear at the Newton home pretending to survey a typical American family. They go to great lengths to take Uncle Charlie's picture. Young Charlie deduces they are undercover detectives. They explain that her uncle is one of two suspects in a nationwide manhunt. Charlie refuses to believe it at first, but she learns that the initials engraved inside her emerald ring match those of one of the victims of the Merry Widow Murderer. She eyes her uncle with growing suspicion and dread.

During dinner one night, Uncle Charlie rants about rich widows, describing them as "fat, wheezing animals." Horrified, young Charlie storms out of the house. Uncle Charlie follows her and takes her to a seedy bar. He admits he is one of the murder suspects and begs her for help. She reluctantly agrees to keep his secret as the disgrace would destroy her mother, who adores her younger brother.

The two detectives confide in young Charlie that the picture they took of her uncle has been sent east for identification by a witness. News breaks that the other Merry Widow suspect was killed while being chased by police; everyone assumes he was the actual murderer. Uncle Charlie is delighted to be cleared, but young Charlie still suspects him. Later she falls down the back porch stairs, which she discovers were deliberately sabotaged.

Uncle Charlie reveals he wants to settle down in Santa Rosa. Young Charlie is appalled, but he reminds her there is no proof that he is a killer since he has taken back the emerald ring. Young Charlie says she will kill him if he stays. Later that night, Uncle Charlie attempts to murder Young Charlie by trapping her in the garage while the car belches exhaust fumes, but a neighbor hears her struggling and alerts the Newtons. Uncle Charlie makes a show of saving her.

Young Charlie steals the emerald ring from her uncle's room and puts it on. When Uncle Charlie sees it on her finger, he abruptly announces he is leaving for San Francisco—coincidentally on the same train as Mrs. Porter, a rich widow. At the station, Uncle Charlie invites his niece on board to see his compartment. When the train starts to move, he stops her from leaving and explains he has to kill her because she knows too much. He tries to throw Young Charlie from a train door, but instead she manages to push him into the path of an oncoming train, killing him.

At his funeral, Uncle Charlie is honored by the townspeople, who are unaware of his crimes. Young Charlie laments to Jack that she knows he was the Merry Widow Murderer, but they resolve to keep Uncle Charlie's crimes a secret.

== Cast ==
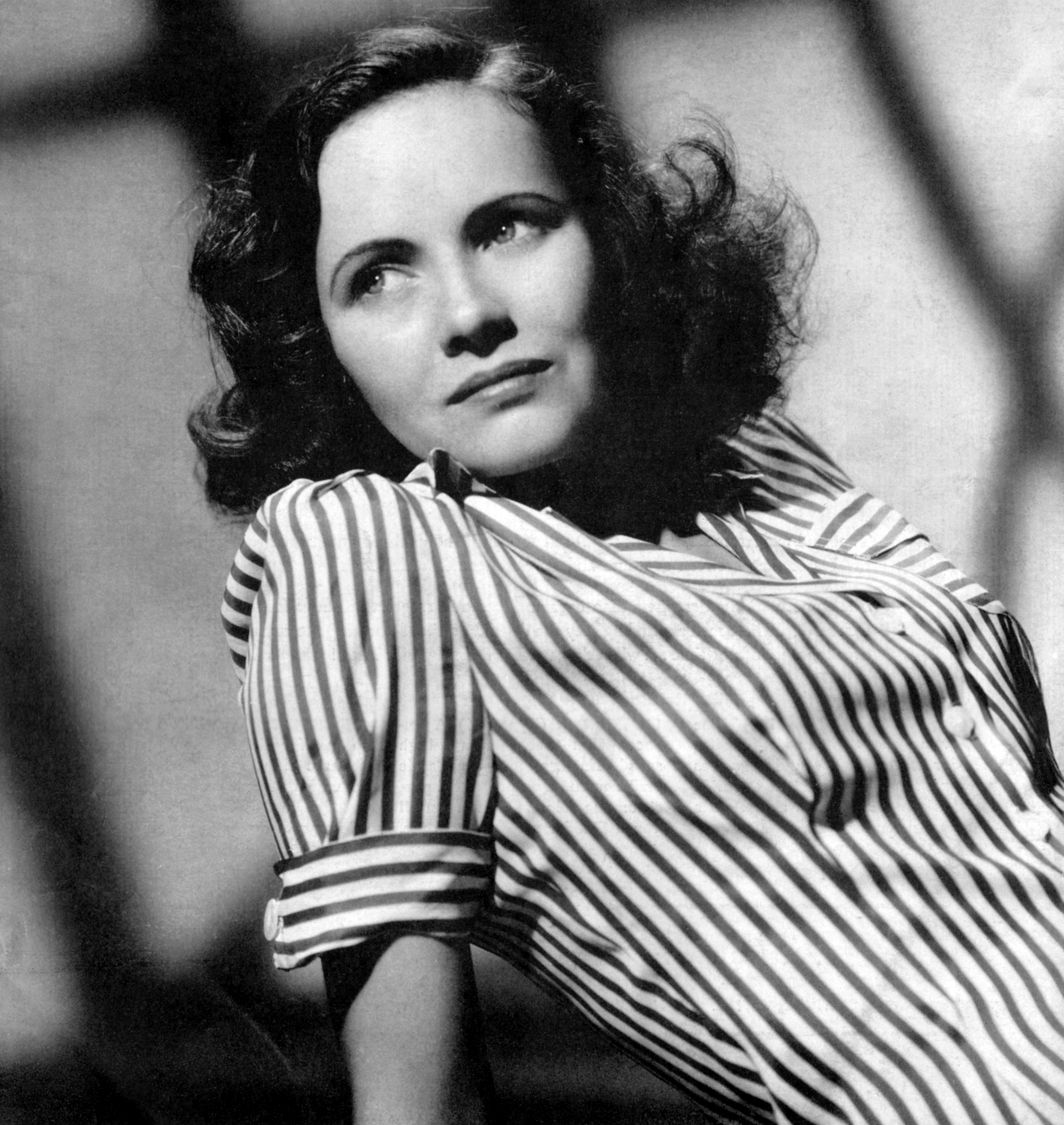
Promotional portrait of Teresa Wright for Shadow of a Doubt, the film for which she received her first top billing

=== Credited ===
- Teresa Wright as Charlotte "Charlie" Newton who initially idolizes her loving uncle. Wright was given the screenplay, and pursued the role of Charlie due to her adoration of Hitchcock's work.
- Joseph Cotten as Charles "Uncle Charlie" Oakley. Cotten had a previously established working relationship with Hitchcock which may have helped him get the role in the film.
- Macdonald Carey as Detective Jack Graham
- Henry Travers as Joseph Newton, Young Charlie's father, who loves to read crime stories.
- Patricia Collinge as Emma Newton, Young Charlie's mother and Uncle Charlie's sister. Emma was named after Hitchcock's mother, who died during production of the film.
- Wallace Ford as Detective Fred Saunders
- Hume Cronyn as Herbie Hawkins, a neighbor and crime fiction buff. He discusses ideas for the perfect murder with Charlie's father.
- Edna May Wonacott as Ann Newton. Wonacott was chosen for the role of Ann Newton by Alfred Hitchcock while they were waiting for a bus. She had no previous acting experience, and had to be coached by Hitchcock's daughter between takes. Wonacott had received a seven-year contract with a film studio, and Hitchcock believed she would have a successful acting career.
- Charles Bates as Roger Newton
- Irving Bacon as Station Master
- Clarence Muse as Pullman Porter
- Janet Shaw as Louise Finch
- Estelle Jewell as Catherine

=== Uncredited ===
- Alfred Hitchcock as Man playing cards on train
- Minerva Urecal as Mrs. Henderson
- Isabel Randolph as Mrs. Margaret Green
- Earle S. Dewey as Mr. Norton
- Eily Malyon as Librarian
- Edward Fielding as Doctor on Train
- Vaughan Glaser as Dr. Phillips
- Virginia Brissac as Mrs. Phillips
- Sarah Edwards as Wife of Doctor on Train
- Ruth Lee as Mrs. MacCurdy
- Grandon Rhodes as Reverend MacCurdy
- Edwin Stanley as Mr. Green
- Frances Carson as Mrs. Potter
- Byron Shores as Detective
- John McGuire as Detective
- Constance Purdy as Mrs. Martin
- Shirley Mills as Young girl

=== Hitchcock's cameo ===
Alfred Hitchcock appears about 16 minutes into the film, on the train to Santa Rosa, playing bridge with Doctor and Mrs. Harry. Charlie is traveling on the train under the assumed name of Otis, and is lying down due to a migraine. Mrs. Harry is eager to help him, but her husband is not interested and keeps playing bridge. Doctor Harry replies to Hitchcock that he does not look well while Hitchcock is holding a full suit of spades, the best hand for bridge.

== Production ==
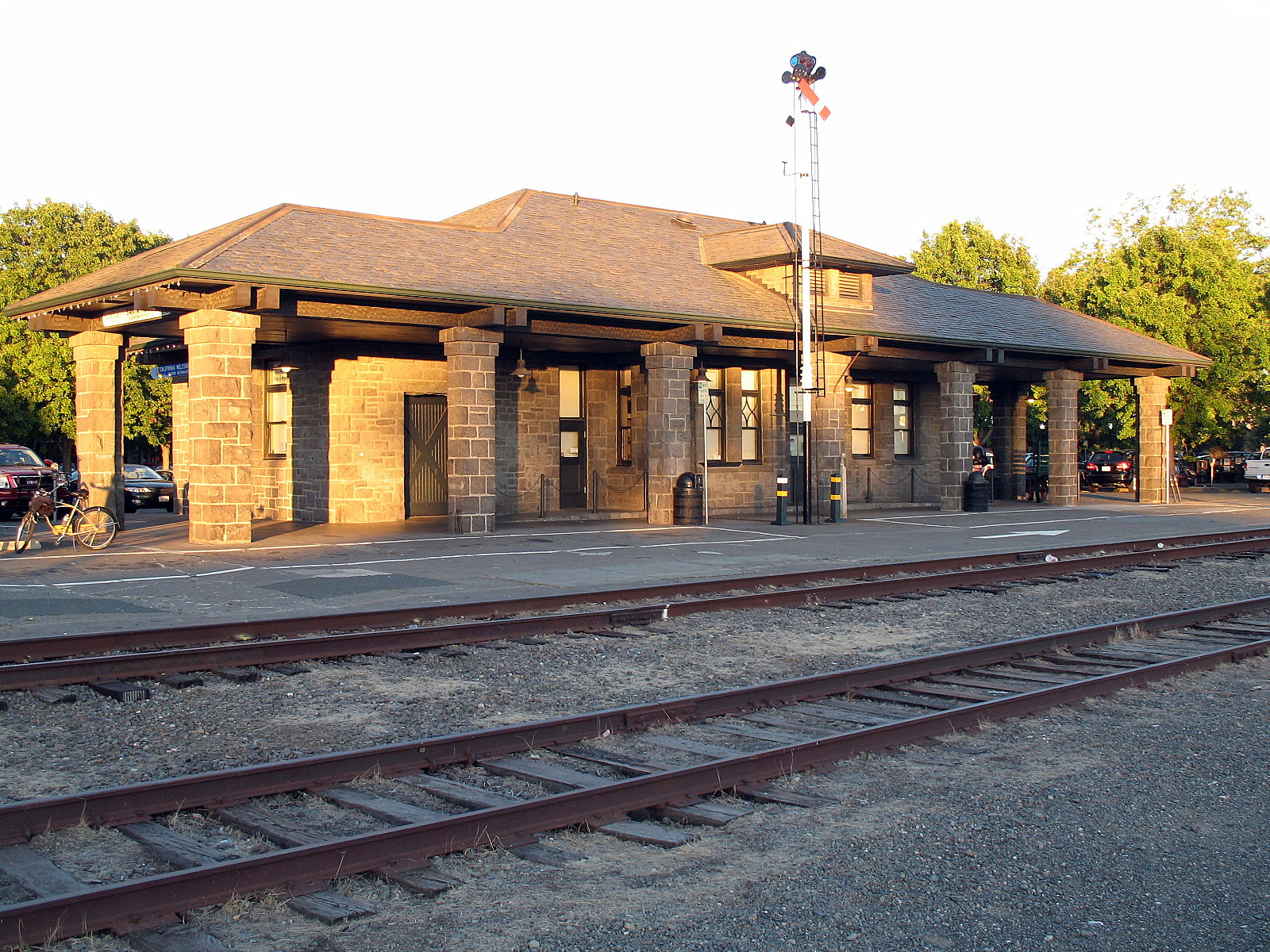
Santa Rosa railroad depot in 2010

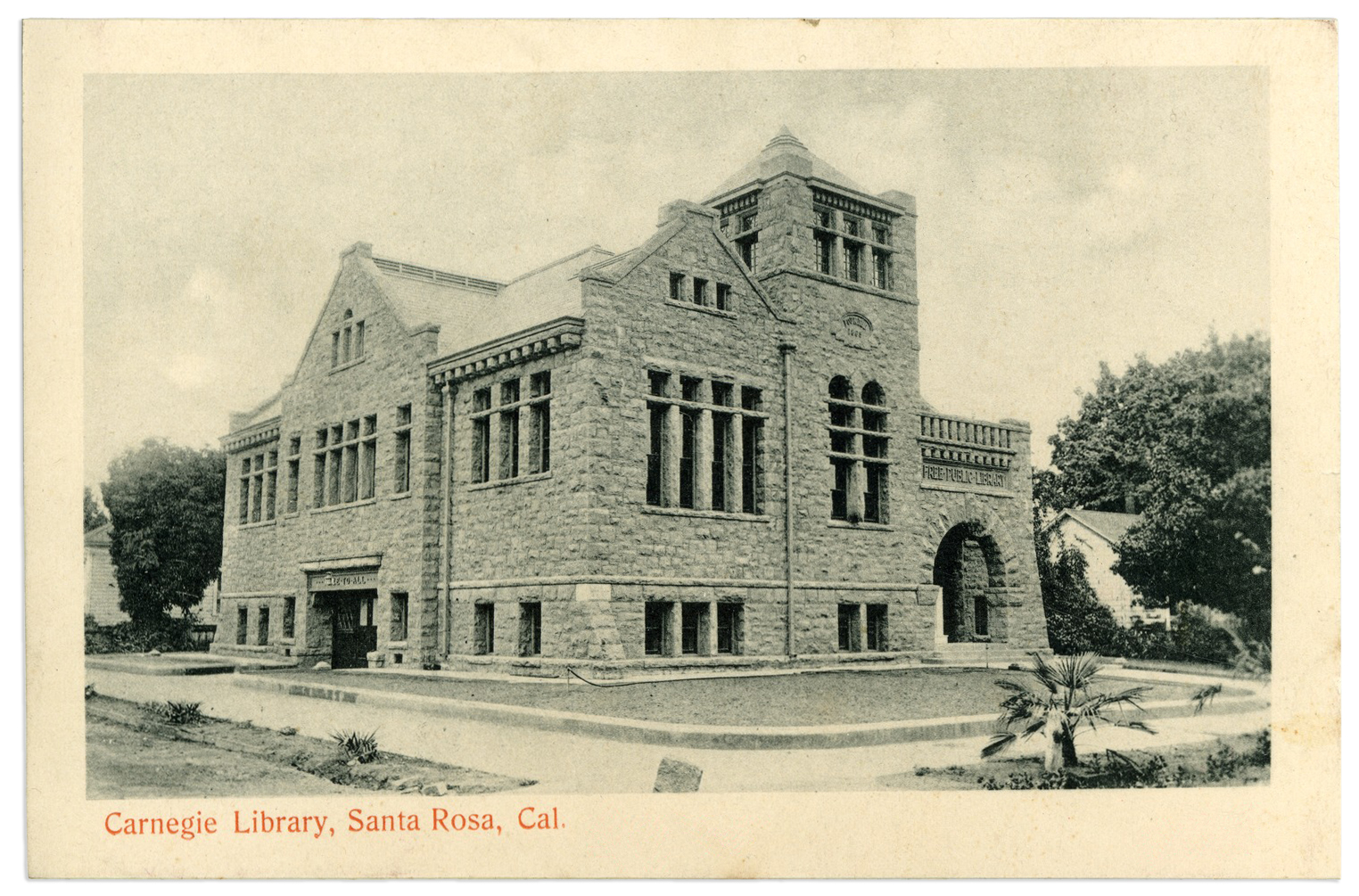
1905 postcard of the Santa Rosa library

The project began when the head of David Selznick's story department, Margaret McDonell, told Hitchcock that her husband Gordon had an interesting idea for a novel that she thought would make a good movie. His idea, called "Uncle Charlie", was based on the true story of Earle Nelson, a serial killer of the late 1920s known as "the Gorilla Man".

Shadow of a Doubt was both filmed and set in Santa Rosa, California, which was portrayed as a paragon of a supposedly peaceful, small American city. Although the film, made in 1943, alludes to World War II (with a headline featuring Admiral Tojo and a bar with a crowd of servicemen), the mood is that of a peaceful prewar American town. Since Thornton Wilder wrote the original script, the story is set in a small American town, a popular setting of Wilder's, but with an added Hitchcock touch to it. The director specifically wanted Wilder to work on McDonell's nine-page treatment because he admired Our Town. In Patrick McGilligan's biography of Hitchcock, he said the film was perhaps the most American film that Hitchcock had made up to that time.

The opening scenes take place in the East Ward (aka the "Ironbound"/"Down Neck" section of Newark, New Jersey). The city skyline and landmarks such as the Pulaski Skyway are featured in the opening shot. The location shots were used to comply with the wartime War Production Board restrictions of a maximum cost of $5,000 for set construction.

An Italianate-style house, built in 1872, was used for exterior shots of the Newton family home. As of 2024, it is still standing, located at 904 McDonald Avenue in Santa Rosa.

The stone railway station in the film was built in 1904 for the Northwestern Pacific Railroad and is one of the few commercial buildings in central Santa Rosa to survive the earthquake of April 18, 1906. The station is currently a visitor center and passenger service is provided by the Sonoma–Marin Area Rail Transit system. The library was a Carnegie Library which was demolished in 1964 due to seismic concerns. Some of the buildings in the center of Santa Rosa that are seen in the film were damaged or destroyed by earthquakes in 1969; much of the area was cleared of debris and largely rebuilt.

The film was scored by Dimitri Tiomkin, his first collaboration with Hitchcock (later collaborations were with Strangers on a Train, I Confess, and Dial M for Murder). In his score, Tiomkin quotes the Merry Widow Waltz of Franz Lehár, often in somewhat distorted forms, as a leitmotif for Uncle Charlie and his serial murders. During the opening credits, the waltz theme is heard along with a prolonged shot of couples dancing. The image recurs frequently throughout the film, and Lehár's melody is an earworm for several characters. When Young Charlie is on the verge of identifying it at the dinner table, Uncle Charlie distracts her.

== Cinematography ==
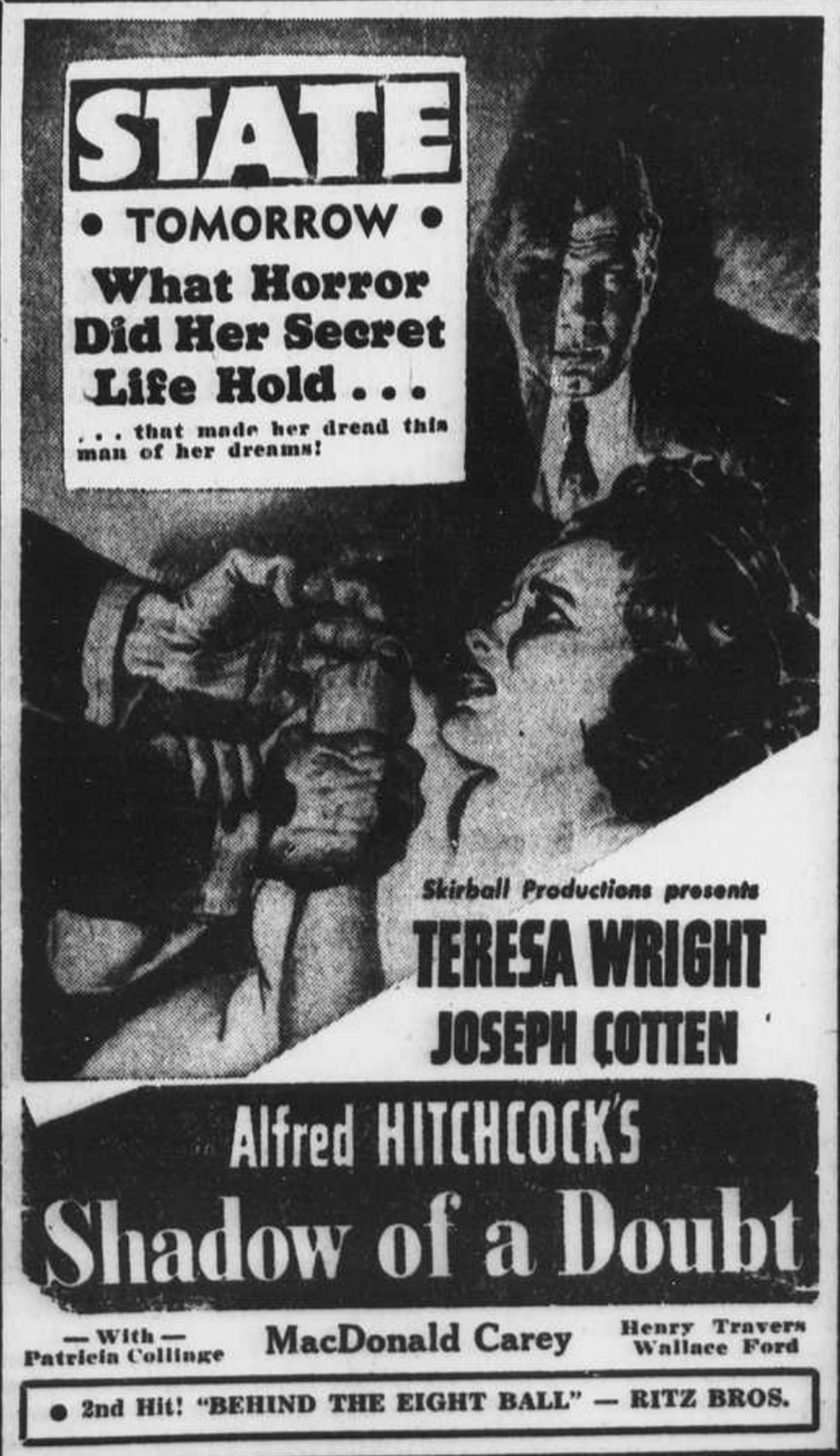
Theatrical advertisement from 1943

Cinematographer Joseph A. Valentine described his work on the film: "Our Santa Rosa location was chosen because it seemed to be typical of the average American small city, and offered, as well, the physical facilities the script demanded. There was a public square, around which much of the city's life resolves. There was an indefinable blending of small town and city, and of old and new, which made the town a much more typical background of an average American town than anything that could have been deliberately designed. The Santa Rosans were very cooperative, and most of our problems in these scenes were the ordinary ones of rigging scrims and placing reflectors or booster lights where they were needed."

== Reception ==
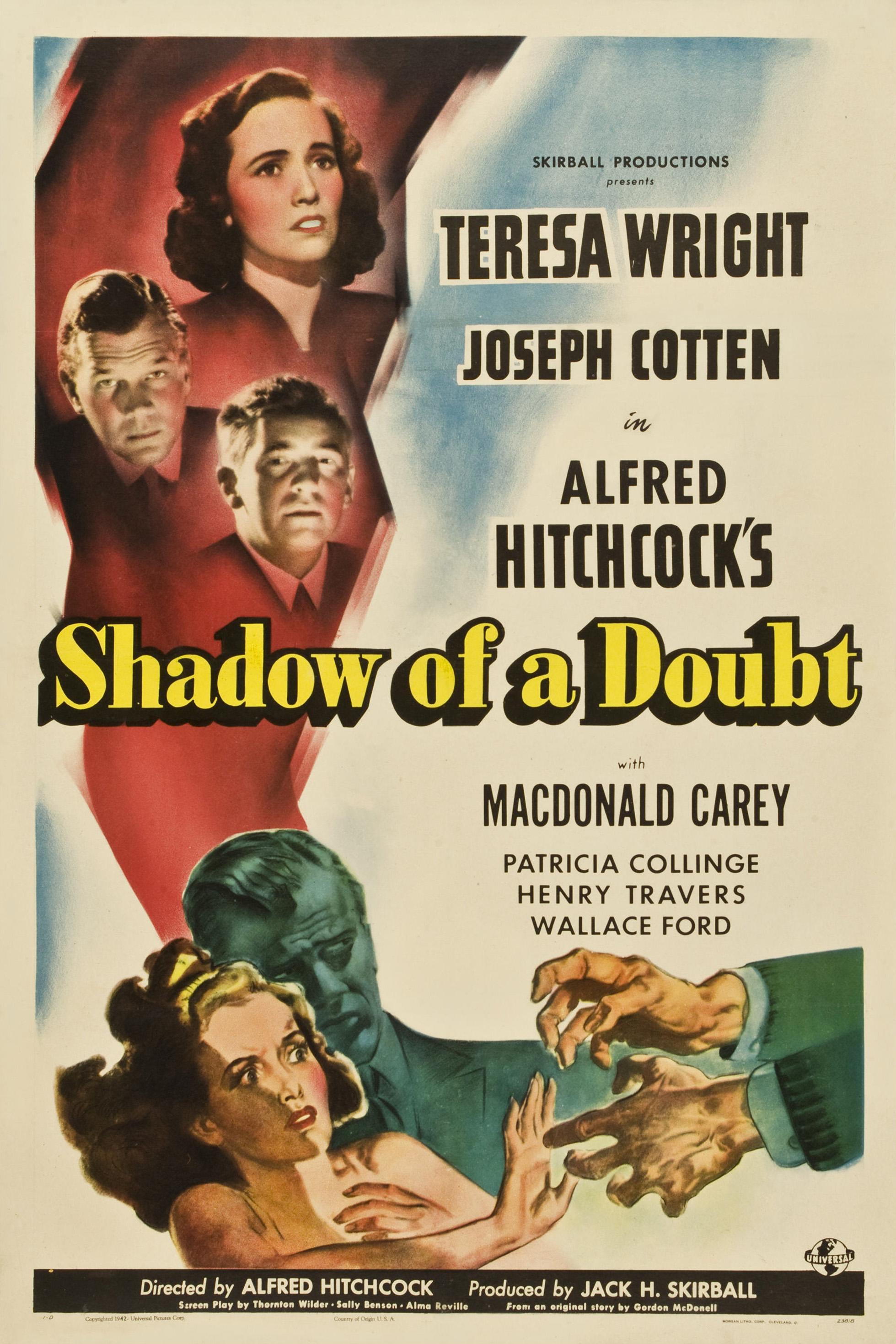
Alternate "Style D" theatrical release poster

Upon release, the film received unanimously positive reviews. Bosley Crowther, critic for The New York Times, loved the film, stating that "Hitchcock could raise more goose pimples to the square inch of a customer's flesh than any other director in Hollywood". Time called the film "superb", while Variety stated that "Hitchcock deftly etches his small-town characters and homey surroundings". The entertainment trade paper The Film Daily praised every aspect of the production, and predicted a big box office for theaters presenting Hitchcock's latest work:

Of all the startling feature films directed by Alfred Hitchcock—superman of suspense and wizard of mystery—this one is geared most highly to thrill American audiences and to pour coin into the coffers of U.S. theaters....There are no red herrings yanked across the trail in this attraction, as was the case in his recent hit, Suspense [sic]. The story moves inflexibly toward an ending which the onlooker more or less clearly expects, but which elicits the periodic hope that the worst fears of Teresa Wright will not be realized. ...Production values under Jack H. Skirball are first-rate, as is Joseph Valentine’s photography. There is not a shadow of a doubt about this picture’s success.

In a 1964 interview on Telescope, host Fletcher Markle noted, "Mr. Hitchcock, most critics have always considered Shadow of a Doubt, which you made in 1943, as your finest film." Hitchcock replied immediately, "Me too." Markle then asked, "That is your opinion of it still?" Hitchcock replied, "Oh, no question." At the time, Hitchcock's most recent work was Marnie. When later interviewed by François Truffaut, Hitchcock denied the suggestion that Shadow of a Doubt was his "favourite". But in the audio interview with Truffaut, Hitchcock confirmed it was his favourite film, and later reiterated that Shadow of a Doubt was his favorite film in his interview with Mike Douglas in 1969 and in his interview with Dick Cavett in 1972. Hitchcock's daughter Pat Hitchcock also said that her father's favorite film was Shadow of a Doubt. Hitchcock also enjoyed making Shadow of a Doubt the most, due to his "pleasant memories of working on it with Thornton Wilder" according to his conversation with Truffaut.

Today, the film is still regarded as a major work of Hitchcock's. In 1985, critic Dave Kehr called it Hitchcock's "first indisputable masterpiece." In 2005, film critic David Denby of The New Yorker called it Hitchcock's most "intimate and heart-wrenching" film. In his 2008 book Bambi vs. Godzilla, David Mamet calls it Hitchcock's finest film. In his 2011 review of the film, film critic Roger Ebert gave the film four stars out of four and included it in his Great Movies list. In 2017, the film was included in the BFI's list of 100 essential thrillers. In 2022, Time Out magazine ranked the film at No. 41 on their list of "The 100 best thriller films of all time".

With 48 reviews on the website Rotten Tomatoes, the film received a 100% approval rating, with a weighted average of 9.20/10. The site's consensus reads: "Alfred Hitchcock's earliest classic — and his own personal favorite — deals its flesh-crawling thrills as deftly as its finely shaded characters". On Metacritic it has a score of 94 out of 100, based on reviews from 15 critics, indicating "universal acclaim".

== Adaptations and remakes ==
=== Radio ===
The film was adapted for Cecil B. DeMille's Lux Radio Theater; it aired on January 3, 1944, with its original leading actress Teresa Wright and William Powell as Uncle Charlie. (Patrick McGilligan said Hitchcock had originally wanted Powell to play Uncle Charlie, but MGM refused to lend the actor for the film). The Academy Award Theater production of Shadow of a Doubt was aired on September 11, 1946.

The film was adapted to the radio series Ford Theater, playing on February 18, 1949, with Ray Milland and Ann Blyth. In 1950, Shadow of a Doubt was featured as a radio-play on Screen Directors Playhouse, starring Cary Grant as Uncle Charlie and Betsy Drake as the young Charlie.

The Screen Guild Theater adapted the film twice with Joseph Cotten, the first with Vanessa Brown as young Charlie, and the second with Deanna Durbin in the role.

=== Film ===
The film has been remade twice: in 1958 as Step Down to Terror, and again (under the original title) as a 1991 TV movie in which Mark Harmon portrayed Uncle Charlie.

Shadow of a Doubt influenced the beginning of Park Chan-wook's 2013 film Stoker.

== See also ==
- List of films with a 100% rating on Rotten Tomatoes, a film review aggregator website.
