= Hi, Beautiful =

1944 film directed by Leslie Goodwins

- Theatrical release poster
- Directed by: Leslie Goodwins
- Screenplay by: Dick Irving Hyland
- Story by: Eleanore Griffin; William Rankin
- Produced by: Dick Irving Hyland
- Starring: Martha O'Driscoll; Noah Beery Jr. Hattie McDaniel; Walter Catlett; Tim Ryan; Florence Lake; Grady Sutton; Lou Lubin; Virginia Sale
- Cinematography: Paul Ivano
- Edited by: Edward Curtiss
- Music by: Frank Skinner
- Production company: Universal Pictures
- Distributed by: Universal Pictures
- Release date: December 18, 1944
- Running time: 64 minutes
- Country: United States
- Language: English

Hi, Beautiful is a 1944 American comedy film directed by Leslie Goodwins and written by Dick Irving Hyland. The film stars Martha O'Driscoll, Noah Beery Jr., Hattie McDaniel, Walter Catlett, Tim Ryan, Florence Lake, Grady Sutton, Lou Lubin and Virginia Sale. The film was released on December 18, 1944, by Universal Pictures.

== Cast ==
- Martha O'Driscoll as Patty Callahan
- Noah Beery Jr. as Jeff Peters
- Hattie McDaniel as Millie
- Walter Catlett as Gerald Bisbee
- Tim Ryan as Babcock
- Florence Lake as Mrs. Bisbee
- Grady Sutton as Attendant
- Lou Lubin as Louis
- Virginia Sale as Wife
- Tom Dugan as Bus Driver
- Dick Elliott as Passenger
- Jimmie Dodd as Soldier
