= Arthur I. Appleton =

American businessman (1915–2008)

- Born: Arthur Ivar Appleton; October 14, 1915; Chicago, Illinois, U.S.
- Died: January 15, 2008 (aged 92)
- Education: Dartmouth College
- Occupation: Businessman
- Spouse: Martha O'Driscoll (m. 1947; died 1998)
- Children: 4

Arthur Ivar Appleton (October 14, 1915 – January 15, 2008) was an American businessman from the Northbrook area of Chicago. He lived part of the year in Chicago and split time between his Indian Creek estate near Miami Beach, Florida, and his thoroughbred farm, Bridlewood Farm in Ocala, Florida. He was one of the leading thoroughbred horse breeders and owners in the United States. He made his fortune in the family's electrical supply business, Appleton Electric Company, founded by his father, Albert Ivar Appleton, in Chicago in 1903.

== Early life and education ==
Appleton was born in Chicago on October 14, 1915, the son of the founder of the Appleton Electric Company, Swedish industrialist Albert I. Appleton, and Lillian W. Appleton. Appleton loved art and antiques from an early age. His mother was a concert pianist, singer and collector of fine art, who instilled in Arthur and his sister, Edith-Marie, her love of beautiful things. Appleton entered Dartmouth College at age 16, receiving his degree from the Amos Tuck School of Business Administration and Finance in 1936. Appleton served in the Navy during World War II, achieving the rank of lieutenant. Appleton married actress Martha O'Driscoll in 1947. She gave up her acting career to raise a family and they had four children, James, John, Linda and Williams. The Appletons lived in the Northbrook area, and they had another home in Indian Creek Village, Florida.

== Career ==
Appleton joined the family business, which manufactured electrical products used in chemical and steel plants as well as indoor and outdoor lighting equipment. In 1947, Appleton became president and chairman of Appleton Electric Company. He contributed many inventions to the electronics field, acquiring more than 160 patents. Upon his retirement in 1982, the business was sold to Emerson Electric. He was also involved in real estate development in California and the oil business in Oklahoma. He appeared on the Forbes 400 list one time, in 1984, with a net worth of $200 million.

== Horse breeding and racing ==
Appleton was interested in thoroughbred horse racing in Chicago and later in Florida; he served on the board of Gulfstream Park in Hallandale Beach. In the 1970s, he started accumulating the land that became Bridlewood Farm in Ocala, Florida. The farm bred over 90 stakes winners. Notable horses he bred include Southern Image and David Junior. The farm also trained 2004 Kentucky Derby and Preakness Stakes winner Smarty Jones. Bridlewood was sold to media mogul John C. Malone in 2013.

== Appleton Museum of Art ==
Appleton, his wife, and his sister started the Appleton Museum of Art in 1987. It was Ocala's first art museum.

== Death ==
Appleton died at home on January 15, 2008, at the age of 92.

== See also ==
- Appleton Stakes
