= Allene Crater =

American actress

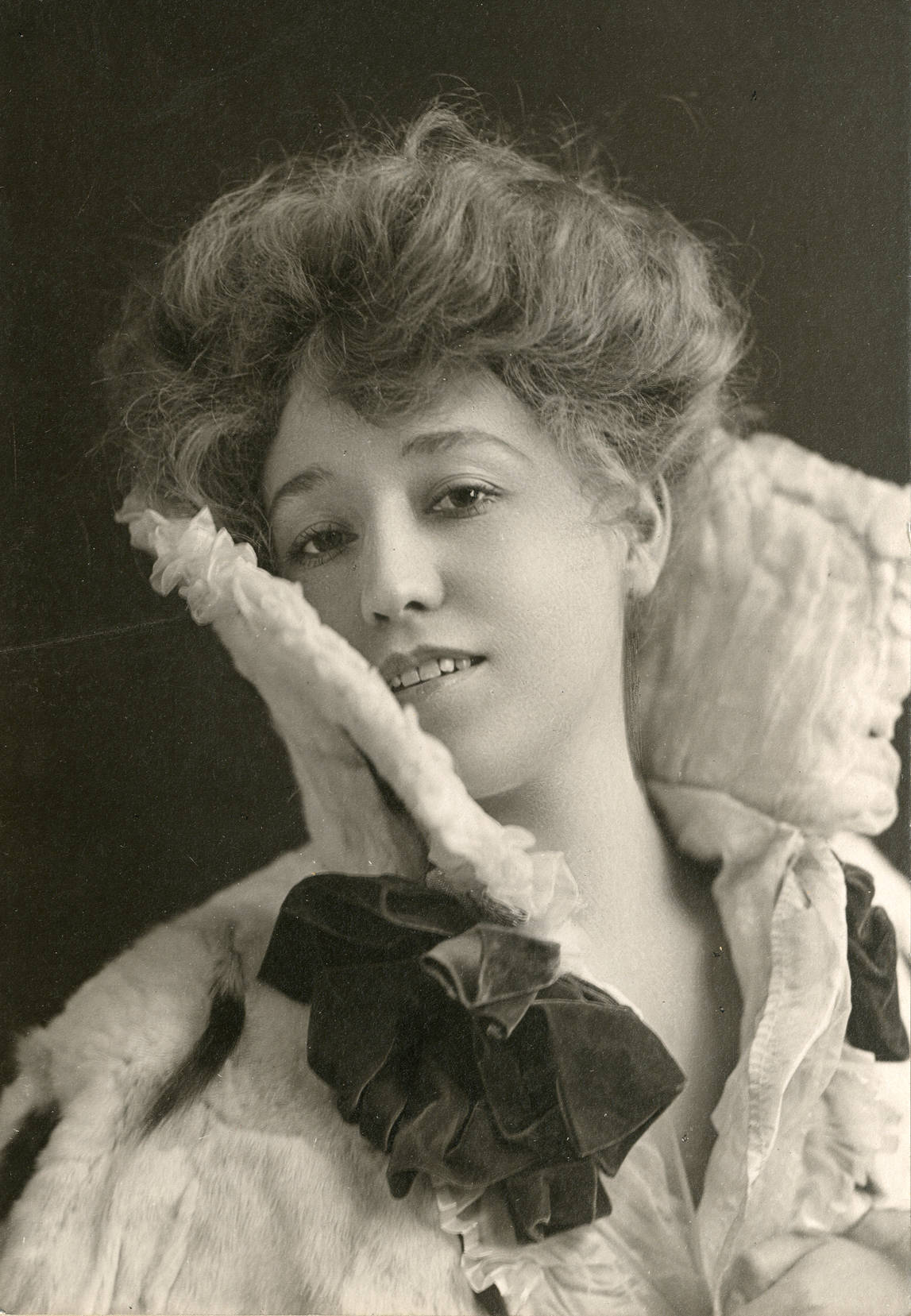
- Allene Crater in The Wizard of Oz
- Born: Allene Crater; December 1876; Denver, Colorado
- Died: August 13, 1957 (aged 80)
- Occupation: Actress
- Spouse: Fred Stone (m. 1904)
- Relatives: Dorothy Stone, Paula Stone, Carol Stone (children)

Allene Crater (December 1876 – August 1957) was an American actress born in Denver, Colorado. She became interested in theater while in high school, performing in local productions and was able to attend college due to her father's respectable income. She made her stage debut at the age of 13 and went on to play various roles in stage productions, earning praise from critics for her performances. Notably, she was part of the cast of the 1902 musical The Wizard of Oz, where she portrayed a lunatic girl searching for her lover. During this production, she met Fred Stone, her future husband, and they performed together for around a year before marrying in July 1904. They had three daughters together, Dorothy, Paula and Carol.

She died in 1957 after suffering a heart attack, with news of her death being initially withheld from her husband due to concerns about his own ill health.

== Early life ==
Crater was born in Denver, Colorado in December 1876. Her father, George E Crater, was a life insurance agent, while her mother Alice was a housewife, according to the 1880 United States census. She was the youngest of four children, the closest in age to her being her sister Edith, approximately 2 years older. The family lived in a quiet neighborhood and her father's respectable income afforded for Crater and her siblings to attend college. Alongside her sister, she was the envy of local children, as they each owned their own Shetland pony which they drove through the city on a cart. Unbeknownst to her at the time, her future husband Fred Stone would occasionally watch Crater and her sister casually from the sidewalk. Crater and her sister became interested in theater while in high school and performed in several local productions.

== Career ==
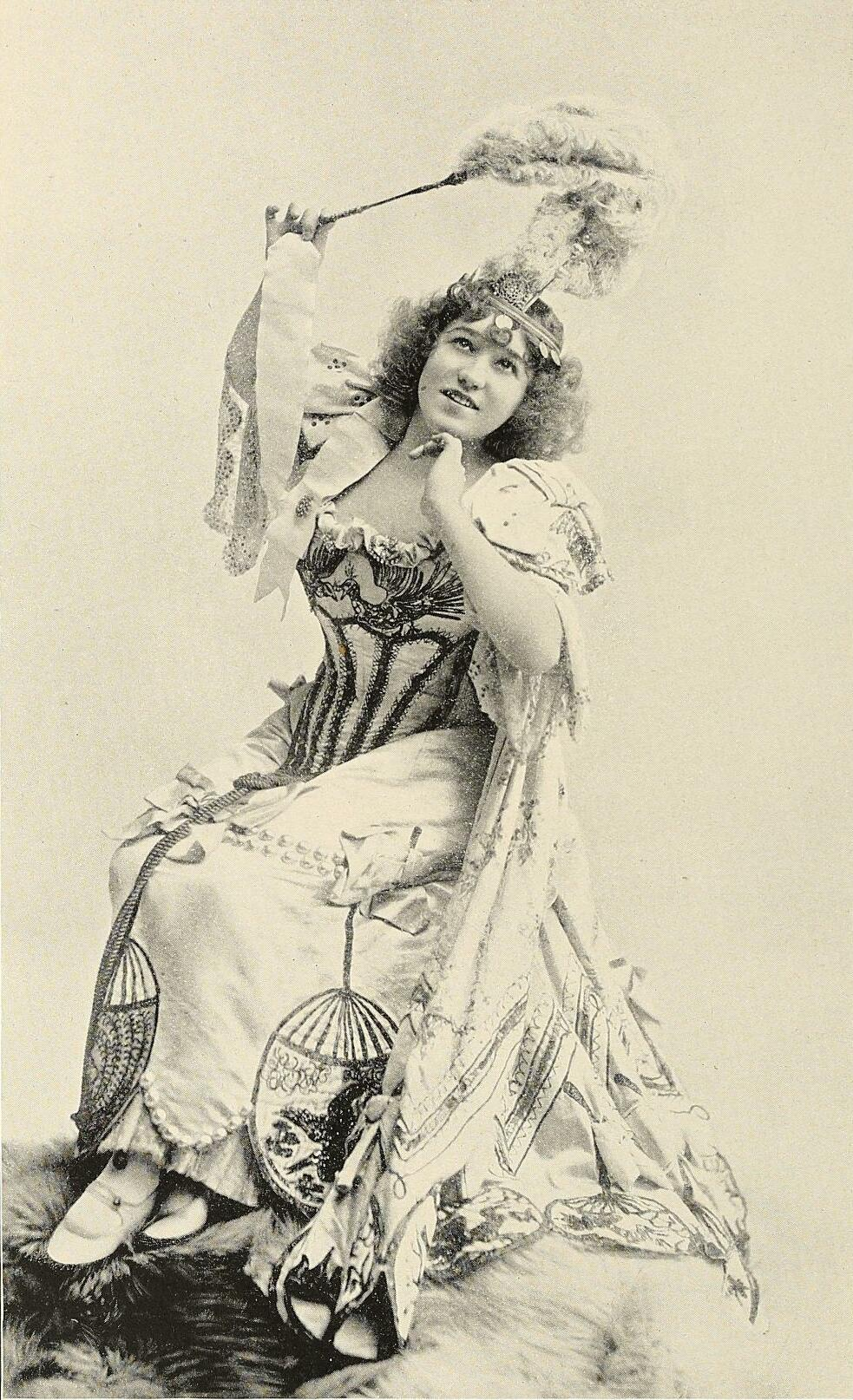
Photograph taken c. 1895

=== Early performances ===
She made her debut on stage at the age of 13, after securing a small part as a peasant with the help of the manager of the Denver stock company. On the night of her debut, she bid her parents goodnight at home before sneaking out through the back door and making her way to the theater. During her early performances, she was spotted by David Handerson and his 'Sinbad' company. Henderson offered her a job with his company and she went on to travel with them for two years. One of her earliest professional roles was playing Princess Badroulbadour in the 1894 stage musical Aladdin Jr., where it was remarked that she sang and danced "with a delightful naivete". She started performing in this role from May 1894, During later performances in 1895, critics described her as "a dream of a girl, fresh and sweet", while noting she had been one of the surprises at the opening performance.

=== Late 1890s ===
In 1898, the stage manager of the Parry Opera Company remarked that she was among the hardest working during rehearsals, noting she had secured the role in Aladdin due to the original actress getting hysterical under the bluster of the stage director. Other performances towards the end of the 1890s included The Ballet Girl in 1897 and Miss Simplicity, where she was noted as singing a number of known songs. She was signed by Harry Conor in early 1899 for the musical A Trip to Chinatown, shortly before traveling to Australia.

=== 20th century ===
Around 1902, while in England, she took the part of the Salvation Army girl in a London version of the musical The Belle of New York, although upon her return to America, she had reportedly lost her voice and had to take a hiatus from the stage. The following year, she was cast in the 1903 Broadway musical The Wizard of Oz, where she played a lunatic girl searching for her lover. She made her debut in August 1903, following a week of rehearsing. It was during this production where Crater met Stone, having not appeared in any stage production for around a year up until that point due to undertaking musical study. Despite acting alongside Carter regularly in the production, Stone took little notice of her when backstage for the first few months, due to his focus on his performance and that he was already engaged to another actress from Chicago.

Crater performed in several musicals during the early 20th century, often with a hiatus between productions, including having been absent for several years when she performed in the musical Jack O'Lantern.

== Personal life ==
Crater met her future husband Fred Stone while working professionally on the musical production of The Wizard of Oz, which they performed together for around four years. They married after a seven-month courtship, in July 1904. The couple only announced their marriage the following month, which surprised friends and family. Together, they had three daughters, the eldest being Dorothy Stone and two younger daughters Paula and Carol. They were life-long friends of Frank E. Butler and Annie Oakley.

Crater died in hospital on August 13, 1957, following a heart attack. The news of her death was initially kept from her husband, due to concerns that he would not cope well with the news; he was only informed once a doctor was present, over a week later.

== Performances ==
=== Stage ===
- Aladdin Jr. (1894–95)
- The Ballet Girl (1897)
- Miss Simplicity (1898)
- A Trip to Chinatown (1899)
- The Wizard of Oz (1902)
- The Red Mill (1906–07)
- The Old Town (1910)
- The Lady of the Slipper (1912–13)
- Chin-Chin (1914–15)
- Jack O'Lantern (musical) (1917–18)
- Stepping Stones (1923–24)
- Criss Cross (1926–27)
- Ripples (1930)
