= Lunt-Fontanne Theatre =

Broadway theater in Manhattan, New York

- Globe Theatre (1910–1957)
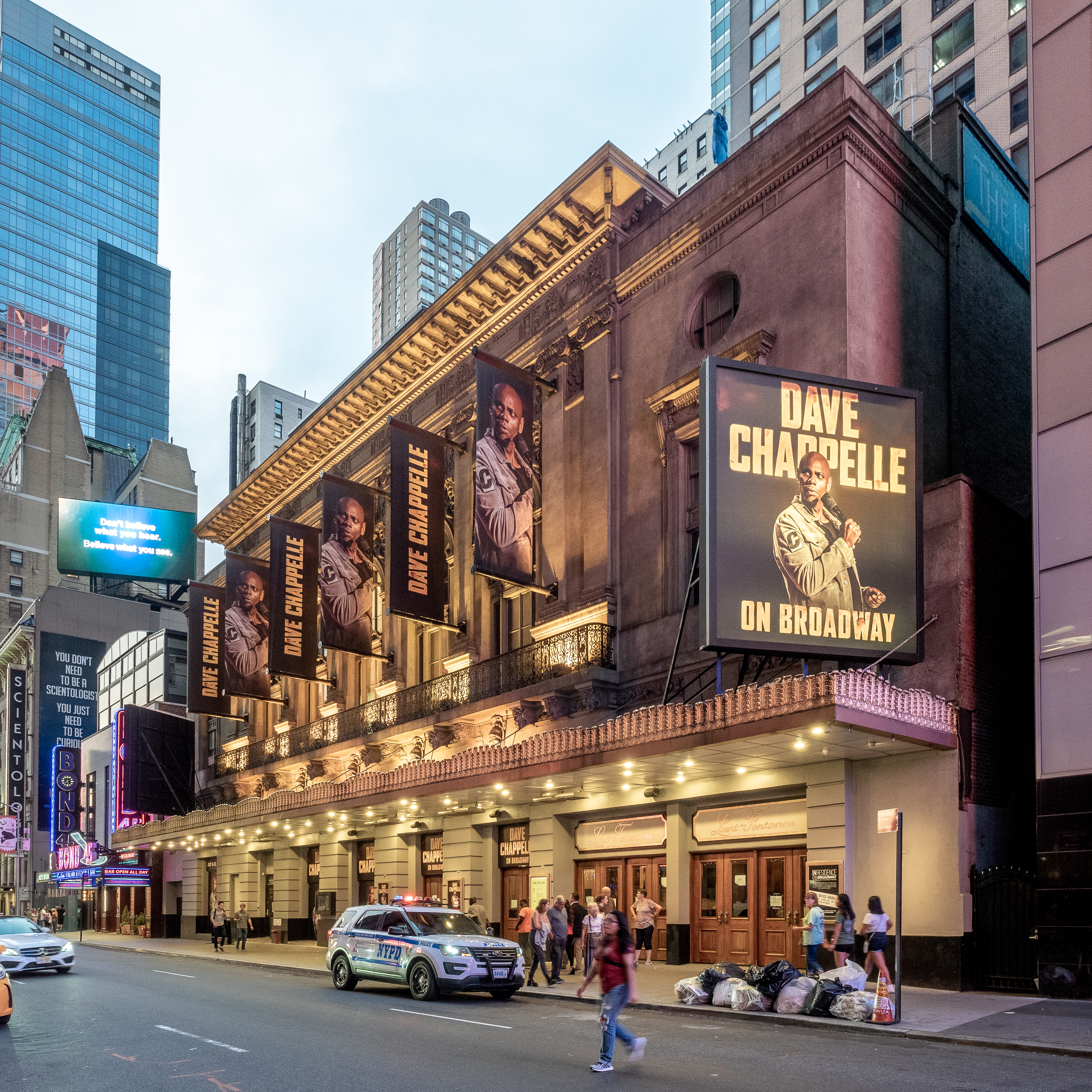
- Seen in 2019
- Interactive map of Lunt-Fontanne Theatre
- Address: 205 West 46th Street; Manhattan, New York; United States
- Coordinates: 40°45′33″N 73°59′09″W
- Owner: Stahl Organization and Nederlander Organization
- Operator: Nederlander Organization
- Capacity: 1,505 (Note: This capacity is approximate and may vary depending on the show.)
- Type: Broadway
- Production: Blue Man Group: A New Holiday Surprise

Construction
- Opened: January 10, 1910 (116 years ago)
- Closed: 1931
- Reopened: May 5, 1958
- Rebuilt: 1957
- Years active: 1910–1931; 1958–present
- Architect: Carrère and Hastings

Website
- broadwaydirect.com/venue/lunt-fontanne-theatre/

New York City Landmark
- Designated: December 8, 1987
- Reference no.: 1350
- Designated entity: Facade

The Lunt-Fontanne Theatre, originally the Globe Theatre, is a Broadway theater at 205 West 46th Street in the Theater District of Midtown Manhattan in New York City, New York, U.S. Opened in 1910, the Lunt-Fontanne Theatre was designed by Carrère and Hastings in the Beaux-Arts style for Charles Dillingham. The theater is named after theatrical couple Alfred Lunt and Lynn Fontanne; its original name was inspired by that of the Globe Theatre, London's Shakespearean playhouse. The current configuration of the interior, dating to 1958, has about 1,505 seats across two levels and is operated by the Nederlander Organization. The facade is a New York City designated landmark.

The theater's only surviving facade is on 46th Street and was once the carriage entrance. The ground level contains the theater's entrance on the east, as well as exits from the auditorium and stage house. On the upper stories, the facade contains a five-bay-wide central pavilion with arches, flanked by simpler pavilions on either side. Another entrance on Broadway, with an ornate lobby, was demolished in 1958. The auditorium originally contained three levels and box seating prior to its reconfiguration. The tiled roof and the auditorium's ceiling were designed with retractable sections, which are no longer in use.

The Globe Theatre opened on January 10, 1910. Most of the Globe's early shows were revues and musicals, including several productions by Dillingham. The Globe was converted into a movie house operated by the Brandt chain in the 1930s. City Playhouses Inc., a partnership between developers Robert W. Dowling and William Zeckendorf, bought it in 1957. After the firm Roche and Roche completely renovated the interior, the former Globe was renamed and reopened on May 5, 1958. City Playhouses sold the Lunt-Fontanne to producers Cy Feuer and Ernest H. Martin in 1960, and it was then sold to developer Stanley Stahl in 1965. The Nederlanders have operated the theater since 1973.

== Site ==
The Lunt-Fontanne Theatre is on 206 West 46th Street, on the north sidewalk between Eighth Avenue and Broadway, near Times Square in the Theater District of Midtown Manhattan in New York City, New York, U.S. The rectangular land lot covers 13,957 square feet (1,296.6 m^{2}). The theater has a frontage of 139 feet (42 m) on 46th Street and a depth of about 100 feet (30 m).

The Lunt-Fontanne shares the block with the Paramount Hotel (including Sony Hall) and Lena Horne Theatre to the west, as well as the Hotel Edison to the north. Other nearby buildings include the Samuel J. Friedman Theatre to the northwest; the Ethel Barrymore Theatre and Morgan Stanley Building to the north; the Palace Theatre, Embassy Theatre, and I. Miller Building to the east; the New York Marriott Marquis to the south; and the Richard Rodgers Theatre, Music Box Theatre, and Imperial Theatre to the southwest.

== Design ==
The Lunt-Fontanne Theatre was designed by Carrère and Hastings in the Beaux-Arts style. It was constructed for Charles Dillingham, opening in 1910 as the Globe Theatre. The Lunt-Fontanne is the only surviving theater of four that Carrère and Hastings designed, as well as the last theater designed by that firm. Thompson–Starrett Co. was the main contractor. The Nederlander Organization operates the theater.

=== Facade ===
==== 46th Street ====
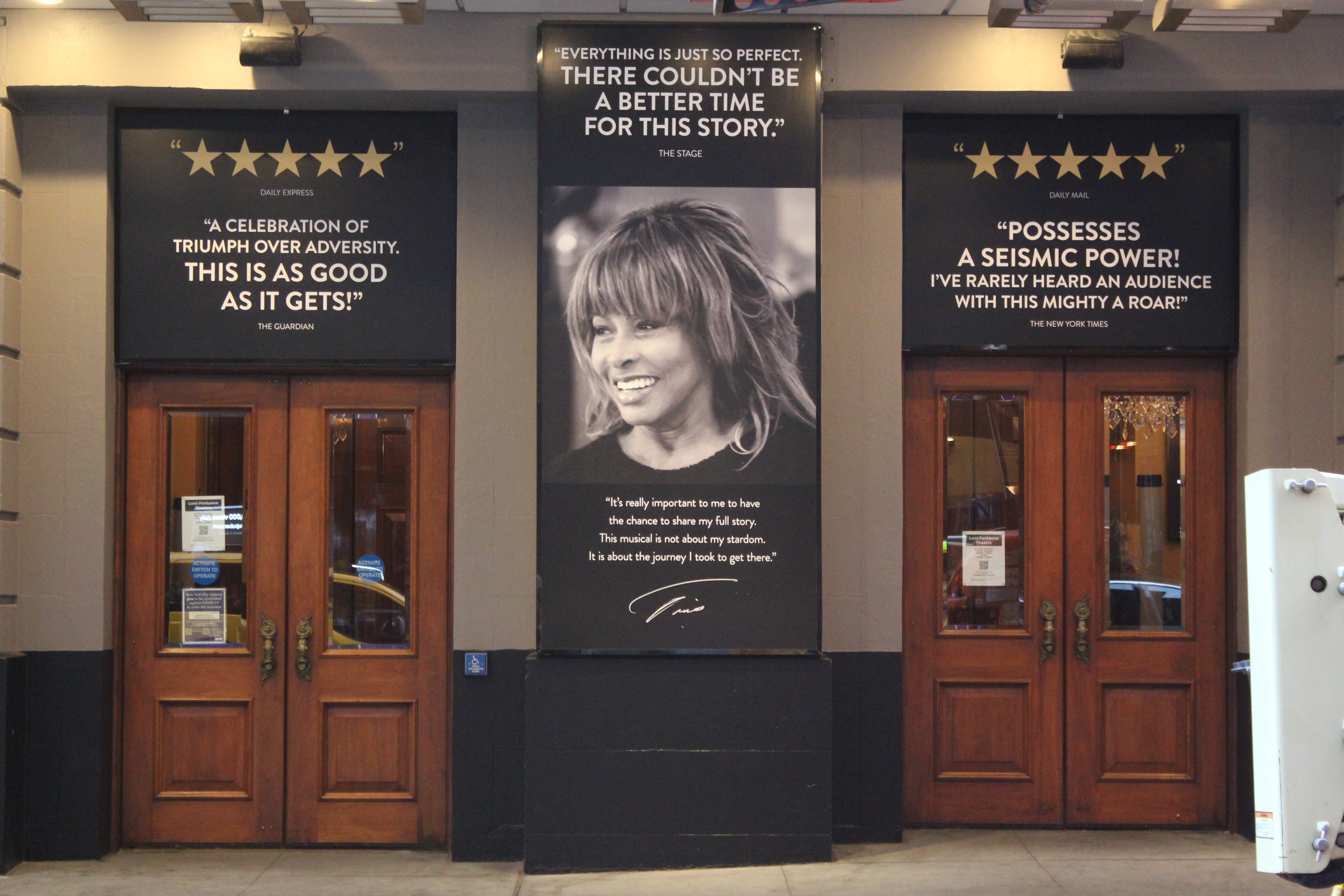
Entrance doorways

The primary elevation of the Lunt-Fontanne's facade is on 46th Street and was originally the carriage entrance. It is symmetrically arranged, though the facade is shorter than its width. The first story, at ground level, was designed as a raised basement. The facade is divided into a central pavilion with five vertical bays, which is flanked by slightly recessed outer pavilions. This arrangement, described as being in a modified Italian Renaissance style, was reminiscent of Carrère and Hastings's earlier design for the Century (New) Theatre on Central Park West. (Note: According to the Landmarks Preservation Commission, the main differences were in decorative details. The Century Theatre had square doorways as opposed to the Globe's round arches, and the Century had a rounded corner with two identical facades.) The westernmost portion of the facade contains the stage house, which is faced in brick and is recessed behind the main portion of the facade.

The first story contains a granite water table, blocks of rusticated stone, and doorways in each bay. The recessed doorways are originally designed as archways, which are partially concealed by the marquee. The westernmost door is the stage door. The easternmost two sets of doors lead into the ticket lobby, and the other doors contain auxiliary exits from the auditorium. Each of the lobby and auditorium doors contain paneled-wood doors with bronze handles, and the openings are also flanked by display boxes. The marquee above the doorways was added after the theater opened; it contains a band with foliate decorations, above which acanthus leaves rise vertically. The first story is topped by a frieze containing foliate decorations and flowers. Above the five central doorways are archivolts with sculpted heads, as well as modillion blocks with alternating somber and snarling faces. The arches and faces served to identify the building's theatrical use.

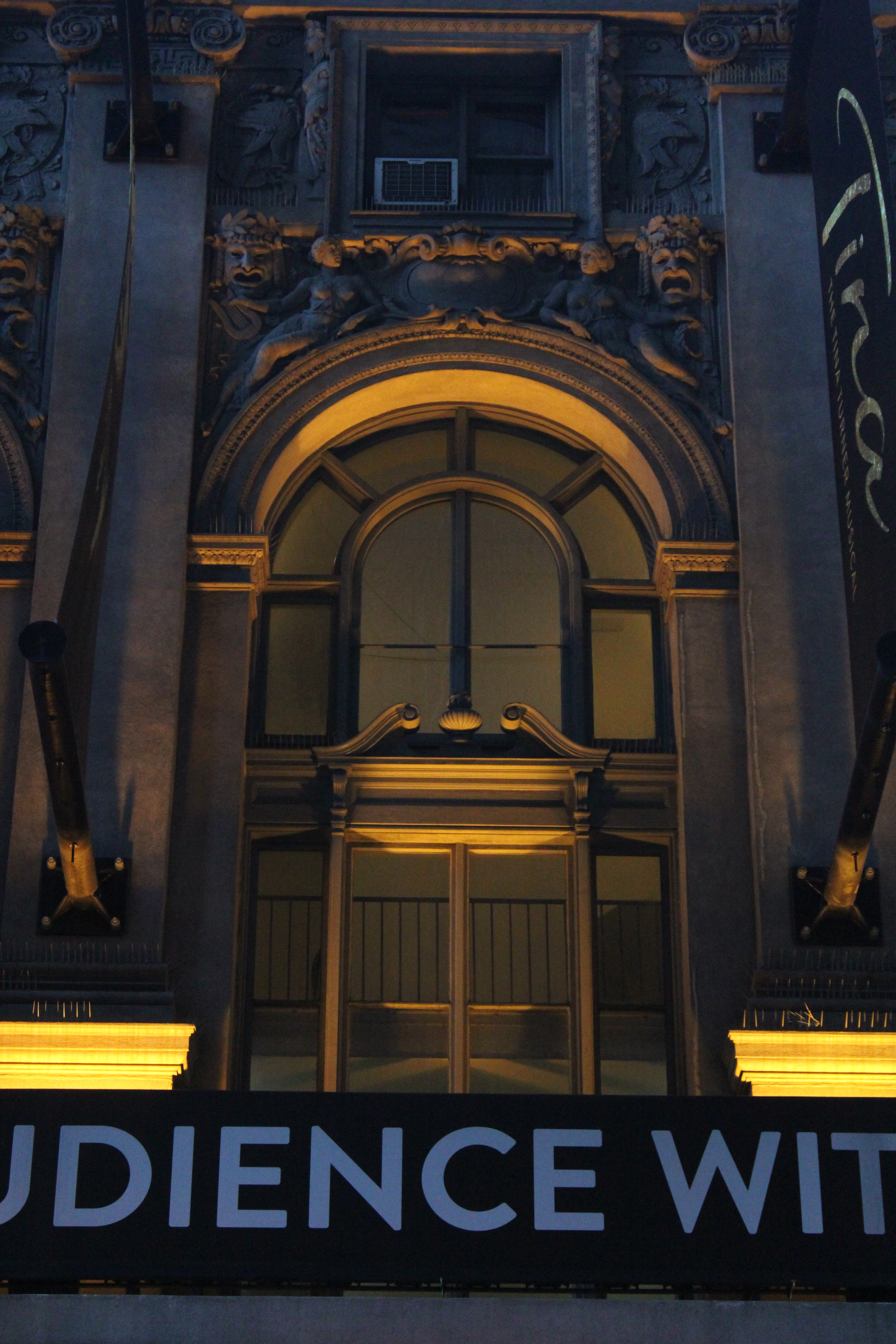
Arched window in one of the five center bays

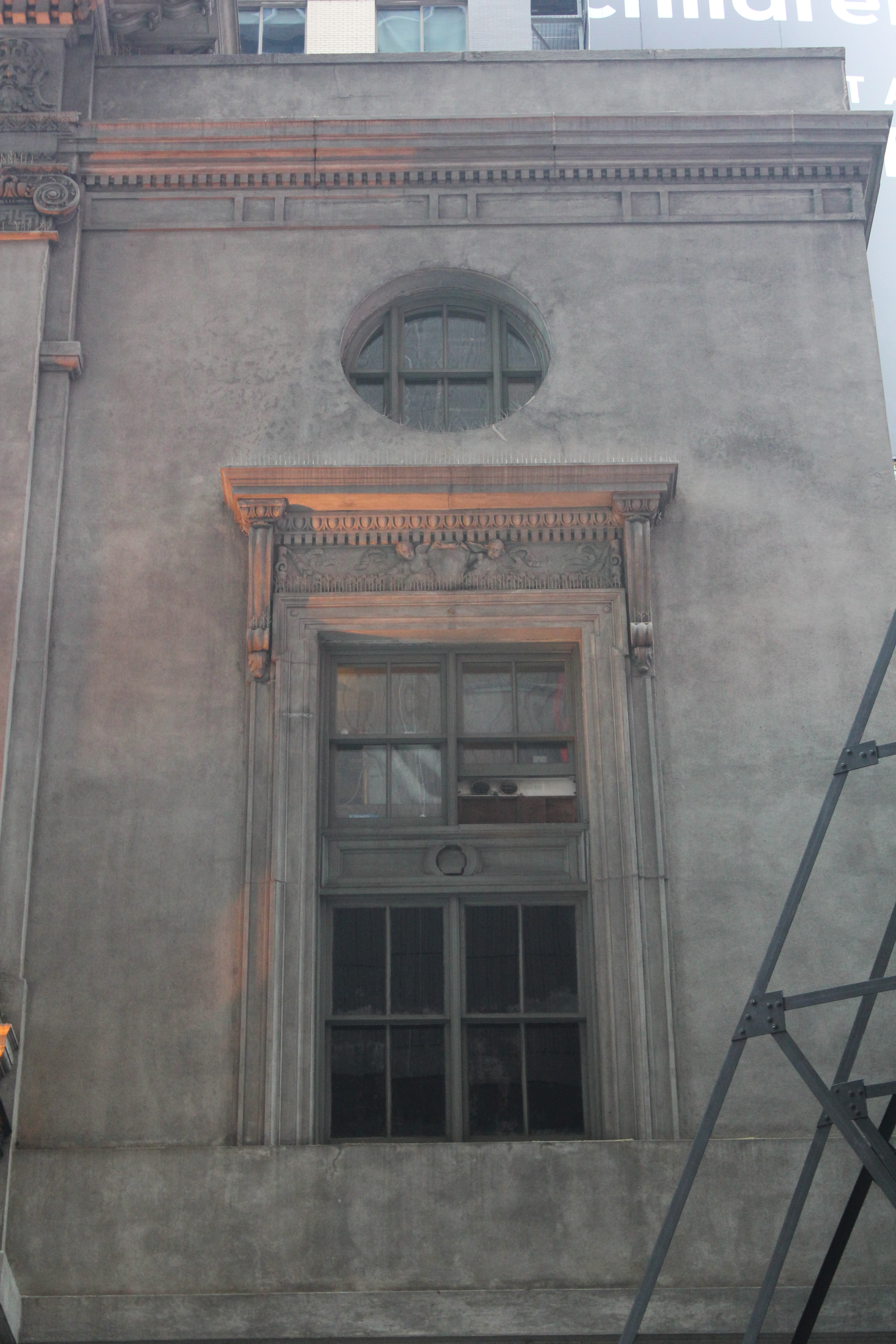
Outer pavilion

On the upper stories, the five central bays form a pavilion with double-height arches. A terrace projects slightly from the second floor, above the first story's modillions, with a balustrade made of wrought iron. This terrace was originally connected to the auditorium's first balcony level. There are pilasters between each arch, topped by capitals in the Ionic style. Each of the archways contains a multi-paneled window, with a broken pediment and a spandrel bar dividing the second and third floor. Above the centers of the arches are terracotta cartouches. The spandrels at the arches' corners contain semi-nude or nude female figures, holding theatrical masks that depict comedy and tragedy. The fourth floor of the center bays has square openings with sash windows, which are surrounded by eared frames and flanked by carvings of caryatids. The caryatids are topped by depictions of bows and helmets in the center three arches, as well as musical instruments in the outer two arches. A wave molding also runs above the fourth floor.

The outer bays are faced in stucco. These have double-height windows at the second and third floors, with molded window frames and projecting lintels above. There is a circular window at the fourth story above each double-height window. Simple sash windows are placed on the side of the western pavilion, which projects from the stage house. A frieze with panels, as well as a course with dentils, runs above the outer pavilions. Above that is a cornice, which runs the whole width of the facade. The central pavilion has a deeply projecting parapet, below which are brackets and a decorative band of heads, cartouches, and panels. The theater's tiled roof is above the parapet.

==== Former Broadway entrance ====
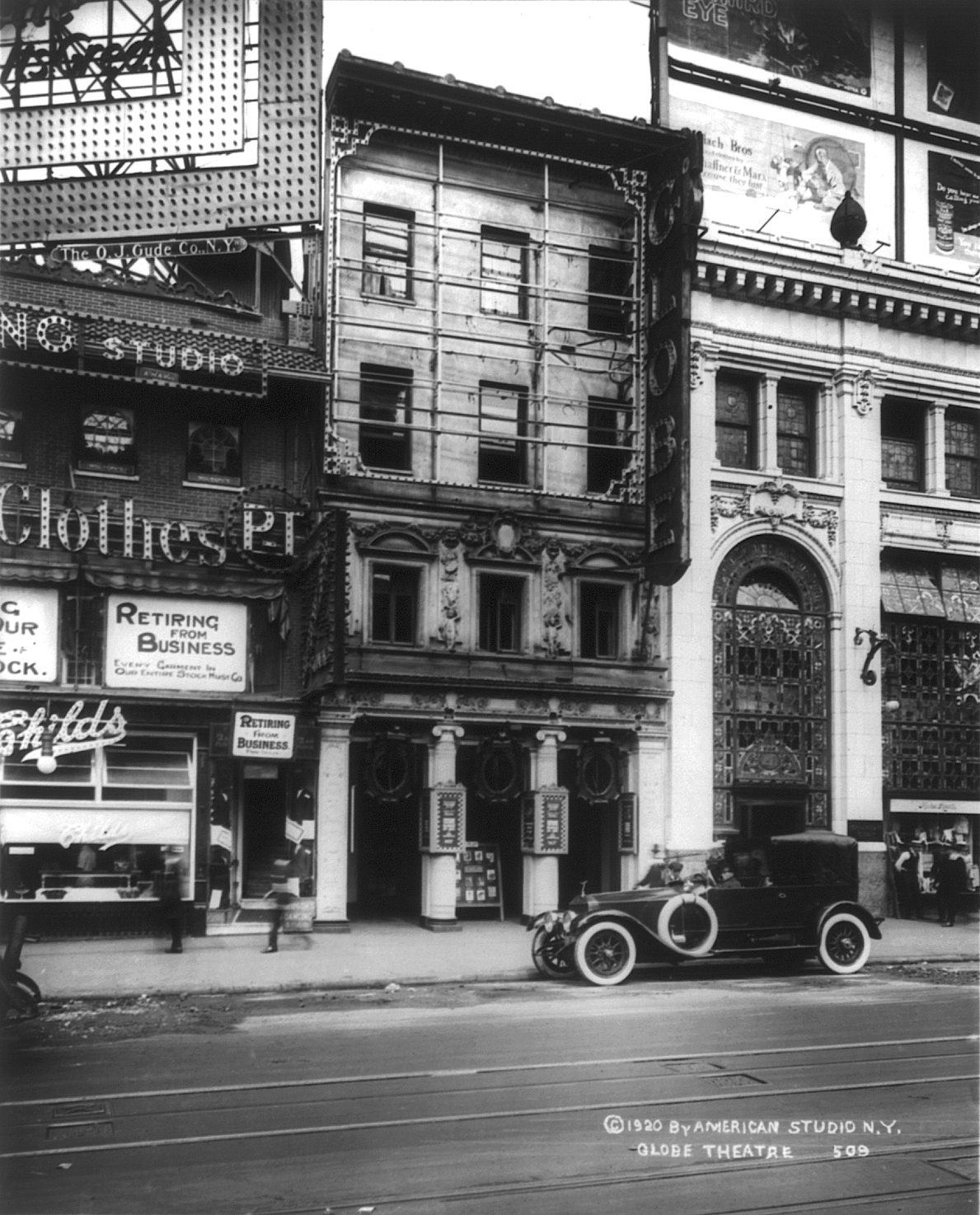
Broadway entrance

The Globe Theatre was built with an entrance on 1555 Broadway, (Note: One source erroneously cites this as 1515 Broadway, which is the address of One Astor Plaza two blocks south.) between 46th and 47th Streets. The Broadway elevation was described in the New York Dramatic Mirror as the main entrance, though other sources stated that the Broadway entrance was secondary to that on 46th Street. The Broadway elevation was four stories high and measured 24 feet (7.3 m) wide. It had been adapted from a brownstone residence and contained signs in front of it. The facade was flanked by Ionic pilasters and contained interspersed stone panels. The second floor was decorated with "elaborately ornamented" arched casement windows. There were also masks, garlands, cherubs, pediments, and a cornice on the facade. The entrance led to the box-office vestibule and a corridor to the auditorium.

The Broadway entrance is no longer extant. It was cut off from the Lunt-Fontanne Theatre in 1957 when the theater was renovated. While the Broadway elevation physically existed for half a century afterward, it did not serve as an entrance, and tall signs were built in front of the four-story facade. In 2006, the old Broadway entrance was demolished, along with a neighboring Howard Johnson's restaurant at 1551 Broadway. The Broadway entrance was replaced with an American Eagle Outfitters store.

=== Interior ===
==== Original interior ====
The Globe Theatre's original interiors included ornamental plaster from Crane & Mahoney, metal lath from Arthur Greenfield Inc., and limestone from Farnum Cheshire. The structural frame was made of steel and concrete. The theater had an Italian Renaissance design with a color palette of gold, blue, and ivory white, as well as "rose du Barry" curtains. At ground level, the promenade from Broadway was decorated in gold and rose. The entire 46th Street frontage functioned as a large exit corridor. The entrance vestibule from 46th Street was designed as a promenade with a similar color scheme to the rest of the theater. The promenade from 46th Street measured 88 feet (27 m) long and 27 feet (8.2 m) wide. A foyer at the second story (originally the first balcony level) led to the terrace on the 46th Street frontage of that story. Dillingham's offices were housed on the upper stories, above the auditorium.

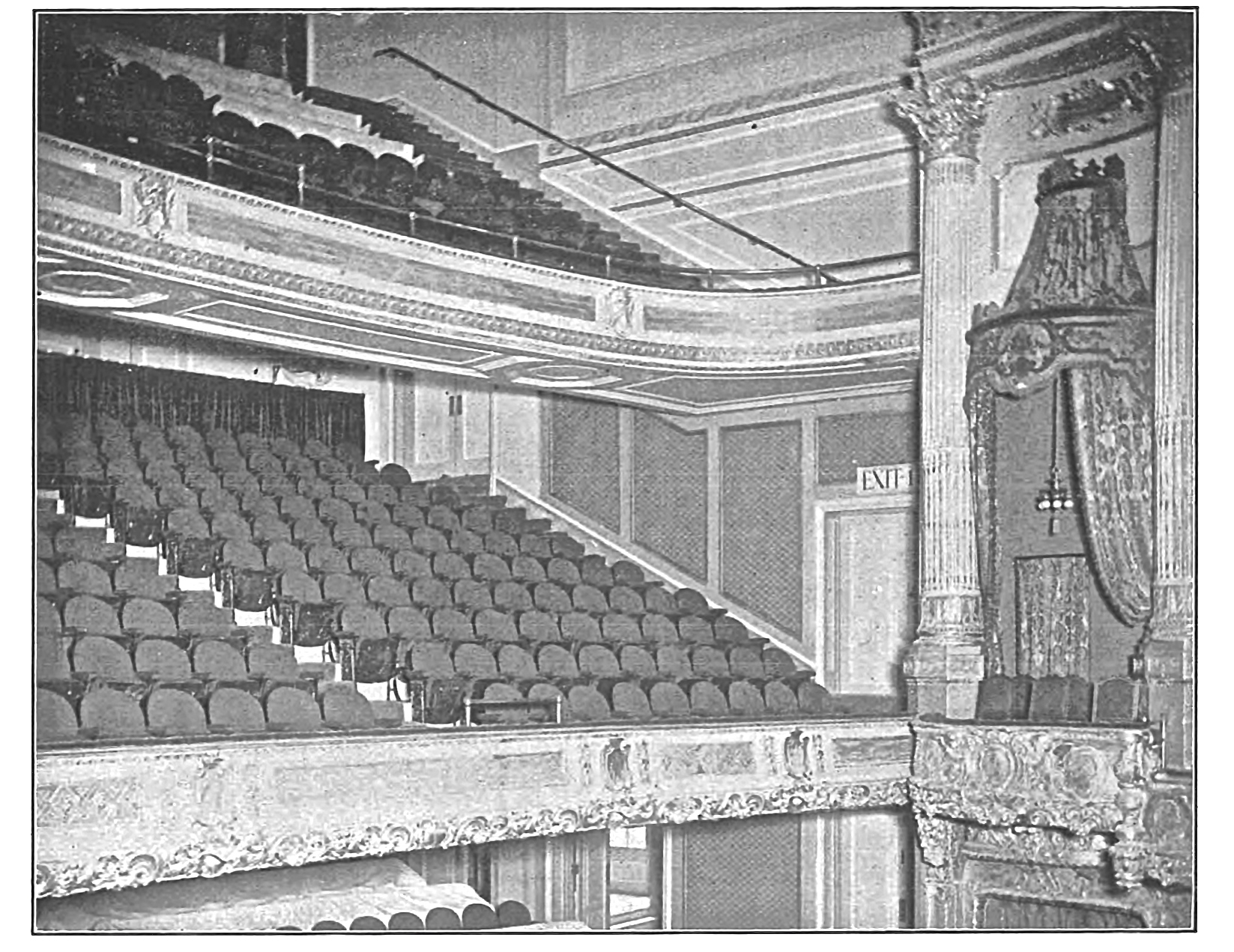
Original auditorium with balconies

The auditorium was designed in a fan shape; according to contemporary publications, that shape allowed both optimal acoustics and sightlines. The fan shape also allowed the audience to be closer to the performers than in other theaters, creating a more intimate house. The auditorium had an orchestra level, two balconies, boxes, and a stage behind the proscenium arch. There were 1,416 seats in total; the orchestra alone had 15 rows of seats. The seats could be individually cooled by ice or heated by hot air from vents underneath. At the rear of the second balcony level, three holes could provide spotlight illumination. There were twelve boxes, arranged in two tiers on both sides of the auditorium. The boxes were at the front of the theater and stepped down toward the proscenium; they were separated by Corinthian columns. Rose-colored curtains were also hung above the upper tier of boxes.

The auditorium had a coved ceiling when it was built. The original design included a retractable ceiling, as well as a movable roof 20 feet (6.1 m) above. According to contemporary sources, the ceiling had a retractable oval panel, which would be moved "when weather permits" to allow starlight and keep the auditorium cooler in summer. The historian William Morrison could not find a reference to the ceiling ever opening; he said that retracting the roof would have been difficult because of debris buildup. The proscenium arch was surrounded by a molded frame on all sides in a way that suggested "a rich frame to a picture". The large stage was capable of accommodating all the necessary theatrical equipment.

The backstage areas had "modern and convenient dressing rooms", including showers for the actors. An elevator connected the stage to a six-story dressing room wing in the rear. The theater had provisions for fireproofing, such as modern standpipe and sprinkler equipment, automatic alarms, and watchmen's systems.

==== Modifications ====
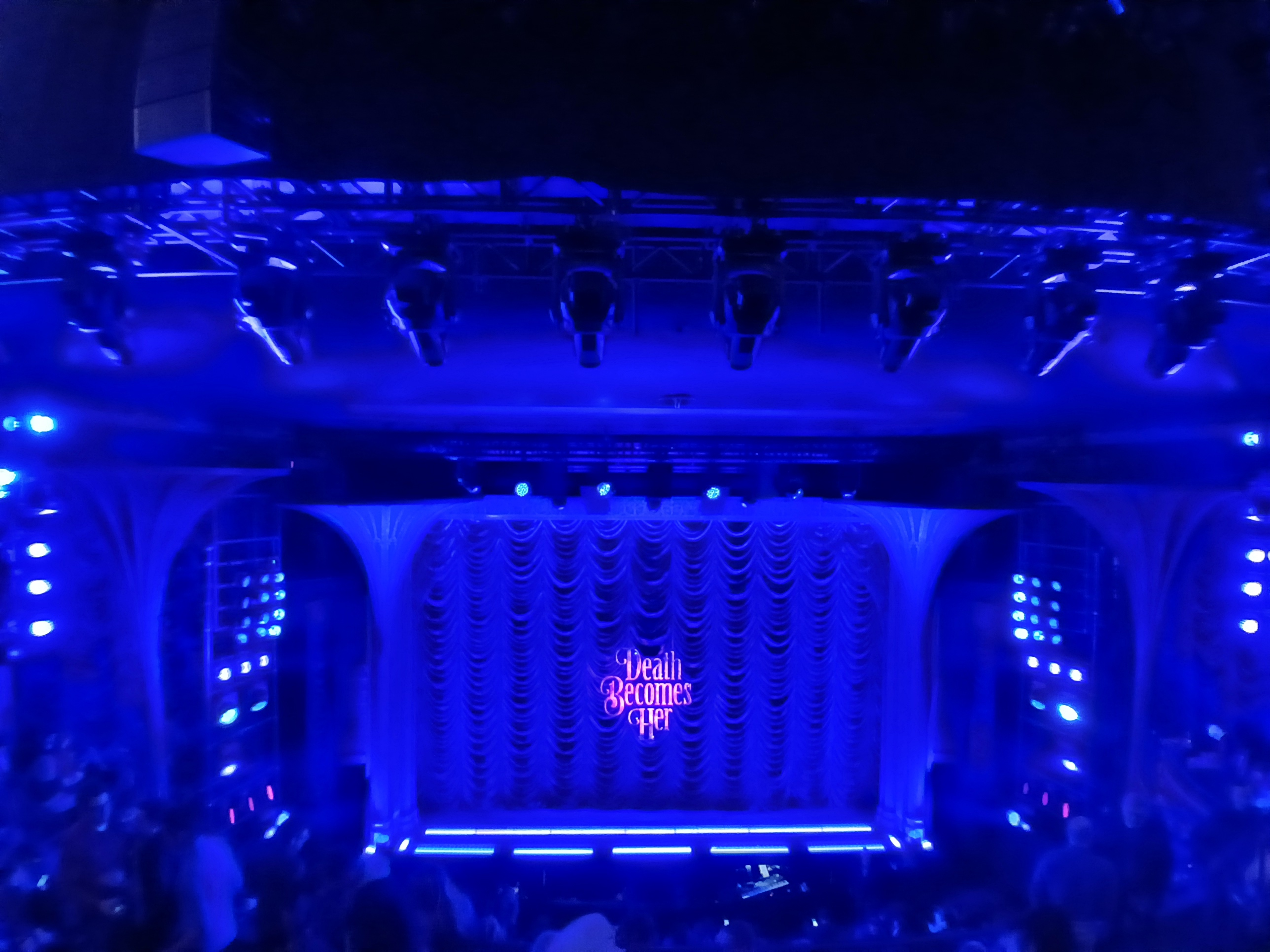
The modern auditorium's proscenium arch

When the theater was renovated in 1958, most of the old Globe's interiors were removed and redecorated in an 18th-century style. According to Robert Dowling, who helped redevelop the theater, the promenade was redecorated in a rococo style with "exotic" wall decorations. The mezzanine contained a lounge with paneled mirrors, as well as murals depicting opera houses in Europe. Blue rococo floor coverings were installed throughout the theater, with a layer of thick foam underneath.

In the auditorium, the two levels of balconies were removed, and a single balcony level with 700 seats was installed. The orchestra level was arranged with 800 seats. In both levels, the first few rows were upholstered in rococo blue silk above rubber foam cushions, with additional cushions for short guests. Tickets to the front-row seats were higher than those for the remaining seats, which were salvaged from the old Globe's interiors. Modern estimates of the seating capacity vary: Playbill cites a capacity of 1,470 seats, while the Broadway League cites 1,519 seats. Broadway Direct—the website of the Lunt-Fontanne Theatre's owner, the Nederlander Organization—gives a capacity of 1,505 seats.

After the renovation, the proscenium measured 49 feet (15 m) across, while the stage was 34 feet (10 m) deep. A new curtain with a sunburst design was installed, and a mural with depictions of theatrical muses was painted on the ceiling. The ceiling mural, painted by Edward Melcarth, was decorated with clouds, which hid ventilation openings. The retractable ceiling was also removed with the renovation. The rear (west) wall was moved about 30 feet (9.1 m) west, and the remaining walls were retained.

== History ==
Times Square became the epicenter for large-scale theater productions between 1900 and the Great Depression. Manhattan's theater district had begun to shift from Union Square and Madison Square during the first decade of the 20th century. From 1901 to 1920, forty-three theaters were built around Broadway in Midtown Manhattan, including the Globe Theatre. The Globe was developed by Charles Dillingham, who first was a theatrical critic and then an associate of impresario Daniel Frohman in the late 1890s. Dillingham began to produce more of his own plays in the first decade of the 20th century, upon Frohman's urging.

=== Globe Theatre ===
==== Development and early years ====
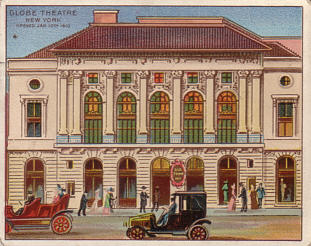
Cigarette trading card showing the Globe Theatre, c. 1910s

The Dillingham Theatre Company bought a 30.6-by-83.4-foot (9.3 by 25.4 m) plot at 1555 Broadway and a 139-by-100-foot (42 by 30 m) assemblage at 203–217 West 46th Street in November 1907. Dillingham hired Carrère and Hastings to design a theater along Broadway and 46th Street. The Dillingham Theatre Company took title to the land in January 1908, and plans for the theater were filed that March. Dillingham originally wanted to call his new theater the Gaiety, but George M. Cohan and Sam H. Harris were also planning a theater with the same name across 46th Street. In March 1909, Thompson-Starrett was hired as the main contractor. The same month, Dillington announced he would name his theater in honor of the Globe Theatre, the Shakespearean playhouse in London. That October, Carrère and Hastings filed plans to renovate the existing brownstone at 1555 Broadway, adapting it as the Globe's entrance.

The theater opened on January 10, 1910, with the musical The Old Town featuring Dave Montgomery and Fred Stone. The year of its opening, the Globe also hosted The Echo, which featured the now-popular song Skidamarink, as well as a four-week limited engagement from French actress Sarah Bernhardt. The theater's early offerings were mostly revues and musicals because Dillingham largely produced musicals. The Slim Princess with Elsie Janis, which premiered in 1911, was the next musical by Dillingham to be staged at the Globe, and Bernhardt returned for another limited engagement the same year. Janis, Montgomery, and Stone returned in 1912 for The Lady of the Slipper, which was a hit with 232 performances. Montgomery and Stone also starred in Chin-Chin, which opened in 1914 and had 295 performances at the Globe. Dillingham also staged the musical Stop! Look! Listen! at the Globe in 1915, with a ragtime score composed by Irving Berlin.

The first straight play at the Globe premiered in 1916, with J. Hartley Manners's The Harp of Life. The play featured Manners's wife Laurette Taylor along with young British actress Lynn Fontanne (a later namesake of the theater). Fred Stone returned the next year in Jack O' Lantern, following the death of Stone's partner Montgomery. The Canary, featuring Julia Sanderson and Joseph Cawthorn, premiered in 1918; the Globe also hosted a limited run of that year's Ziegfeld Follies. The decade ended with She's a Good Fellow with Joseph Santley and the Duncan Sisters in 1919, the run of which was truncated by the 1919 Actors' Equity Association strike. Dillingham had produced all of the theater's musicals and plays during the 1910s, while Jerome Kern and Anne Caldwell collaborated on many of the musical scores.

==== 1920s and early 1930s ====
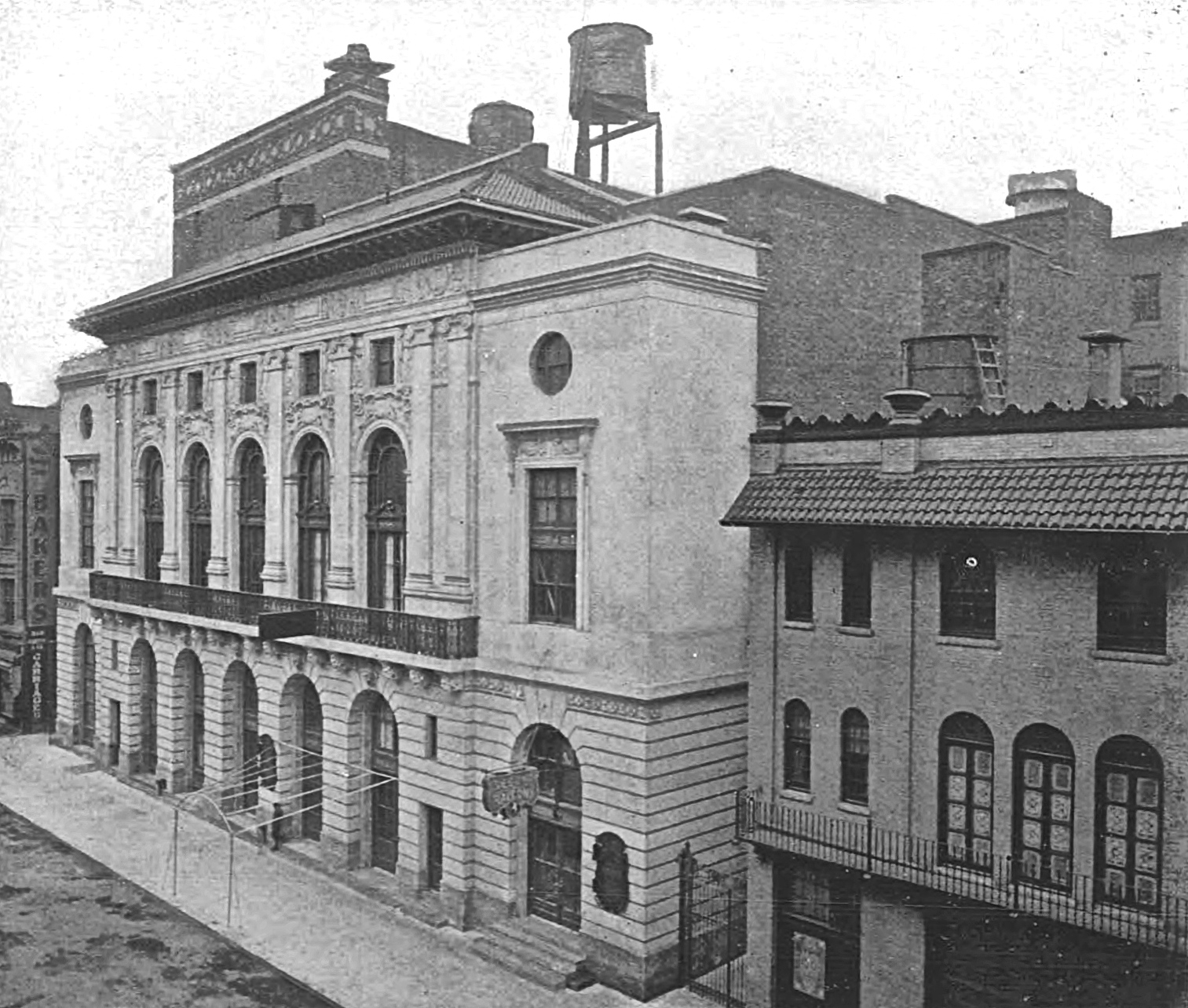
Early view of the theater from 46th Street, looking west

Dillingham had originally leased the theater from the Dillingham Theatre Company, operated by the Gould family. In April 1920, he bought the theater outright for $1.25 million, with plans to remodel the property for his offices. That July, W. T. Smith filed plans for a seven-story office wing at 1555 Broadway. Elaborate revues at the Globe, which were staged starting in the late 1910s, continued into the 1920s. These included the 1920 edition of George White's Scandals, the Globe's first show that did not have Dillingham as a writer. It was followed the same year by another Dillingham play, Tip Top with Stone and the Duncan Sisters, running 241 performances. The 1921 edition of the Ziegfeld Follies was staged at the Globe, and Kern and Caldwell's production Good Morning, Dearie opened the same year. Further editions of George White's Scandals premiered in 1922 and 1923. The former edition's score inspired the opera Porgy and Bess, while the latter saw little success.

Dillingham leased the theater to Oliver Morosco in January 1923 for the production of Lady Butterfly at the then-exorbitant price of $6,000 a week. Fred Stone and his daughter Dorothy performed later that year in the musical Stepping Stones, another Dillingham production. This was followed in 1924 by comedian Ed Wynn's The Grab Bag, which ran 184 performances. A major hit came to the Globe in 1925 with the opening of No, No, Nanette, where featured performer Louise Groody became the first musical-comedy performer to earn over $1 million. Florenz Ziegfeld Jr. was slated to run the Ziegfeld Follies at the Globe the following year, but he was not allowed to use the name due to a disagreement with his partners Klaw and Erlanger. As a result, in 1926, he hosted No Foolin' (subsequently Ziegfeld's American Revue) at the Globe. The same year, Dillingham produced Criss Cross with Fred and Dorothy Stone, and Oh, Please! featured Beatrice Lillie. Fred Stone also planned to return to the Globe in 1928, appearing in Three Cheers with Dorothy, but he was replaced at the last minute with Will Rogers; the play ran through early 1929.

=== Bankruptcy and cinematic use ===
By 1930, the Globe Theatre was leased to Radio-Keith-Orpheum (RKO) as a movie house, at least until a new RKO theater was finished on the site of the old Columbia Theatre. That year, the Dillingham Theater Company obtained a $200,000 second mortgage on the theater. Upon the expiry of RKO's lease in July 1931, the Globe returned to legitimate use. The play The Cat and the Fiddle, which opened later that year, was the last legitimate production at the Globe before the theater became a cinema for 25 years. Due to the Globe's financial troubles, The Cat and the Fiddle was moved to George M. Cohan's Theatre in May 1932. At the time, the second mortgage holder, Spear Securities, sought to foreclose on the theater. Dillingham's friends, including Fred Stone, attempted to recover the theater on his behalf.

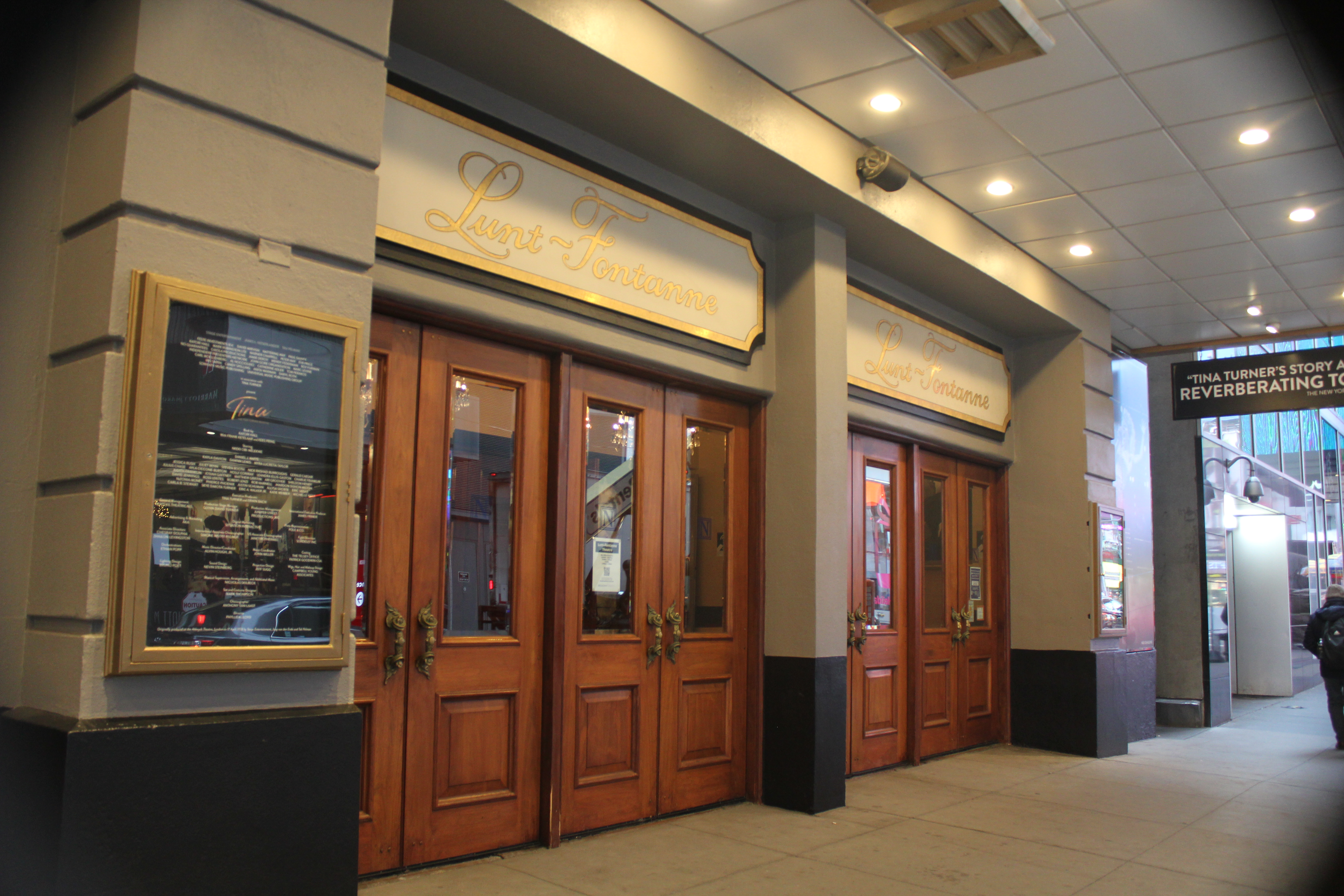
Theater entrance on 46th Street

Dillingham ultimately went into bankruptcy in 1933 with debts of over $7 million. A major factor in the bankruptcy was the Great Depression, during which many Broadway theaters were impacted by declining attendance. Spear Securities acquired the theater at a foreclosure auction in October 1932 for $1.125 million. Brandt Theatres subsequently began to lease the Globe for films. By the next year, the theater was owned by the Globe Land Corporation, and the New York Public Library held a $1.1 million first mortgage on the theater. Under Brandt's management, the Globe largely showed reruns, which drew complaints from the operator of the rival Roxy Theatre.

In February 1936, Harry Brandt of Brandt Theatres announced that he had purchased the Globe for $1.15 million, subject to existing mortgages. He then announced that he would renovate the Globe to serve as headquarters for his company. Brandt announced in 1938 that the Globe would begin to offer five-act vaudeville, followed by one film. The Globe hosted numerous premieres of films, including The Road Back in 1937 and The Roosevelt Story in 1947. Among the other films screened at the theater were Souls at Sea (1937), One of Our Aircraft Is Missing (1942), Eagle Squadron (1942), Somewhere in France (1943), Make Mine Music (1946), The Macomber Affair (1947), Anna (1951), Destination Gobi (1953),Three Hours to Kill (1954), and On the Threshold of Space (1956). In 1951, Al Beckman and Johnny Pransky considered acquiring the Globe for their vaudeville circuit.

=== Lunt-Fontanne Theatre ===
==== Renovation and reopening ====
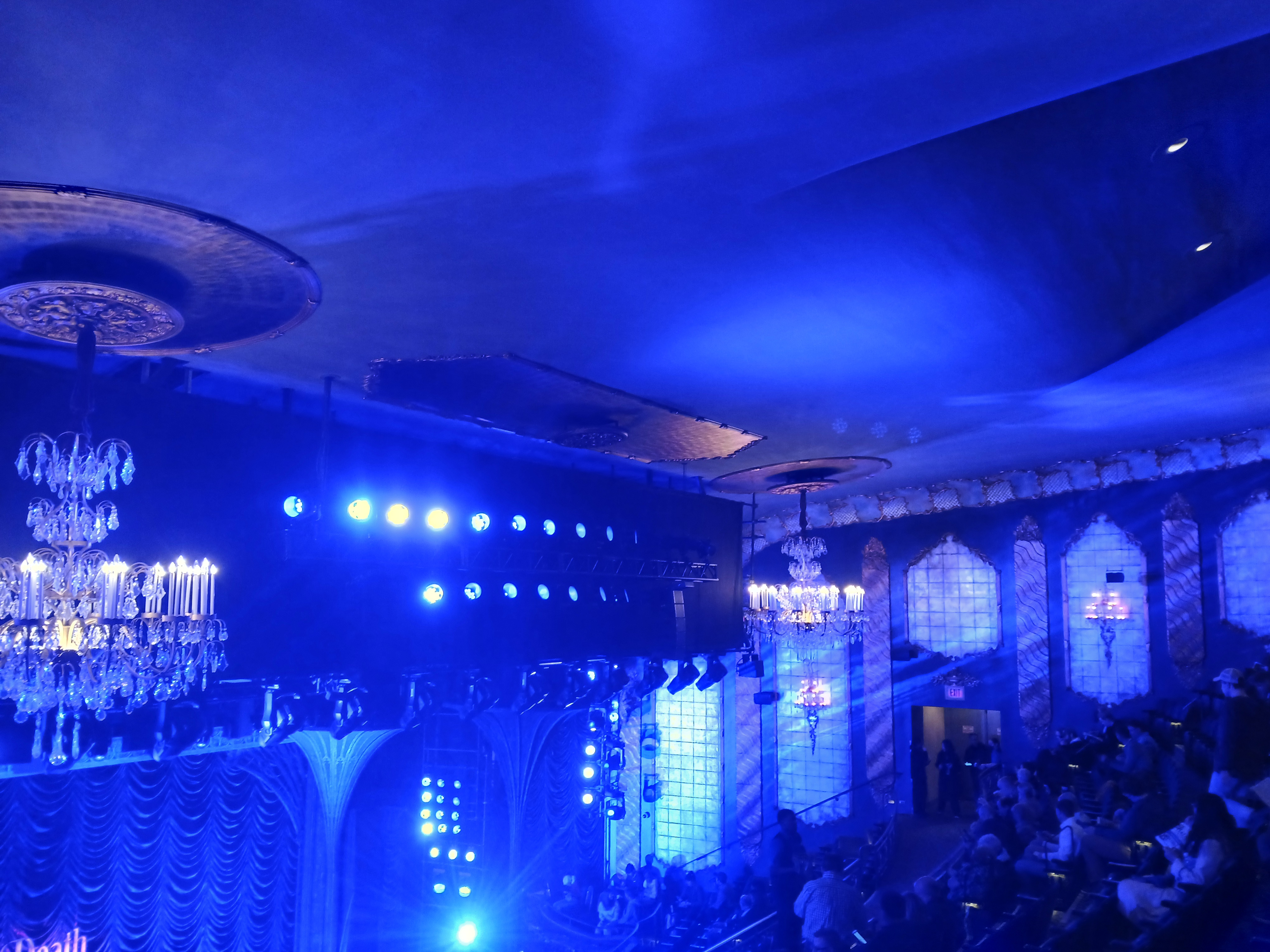
Right hand wall of the auditorium

By 1955, Roger L. Stevens, Robert Whitehead, and Robert W. Dowling were negotiating to acquire the Globe Theatre for legitimate use. Stevens and Dowling reneged after conducting a study, which found they would have to spend $400,000 to renovate the theater and that the venue would only be able to fit about 1,300 people. The next June, Stevens partnered with William Zeckendorf in another bid to acquire the theater, with Cy Feuer and Ernest Martin as the producers. Despite some delays in September 1956, Stevens, Whitehead, Dowling, and Zeckendorf ultimately acquired the theater in 1957 under the City Playhouses name. Stevens and Whitehead were affiliated with Producers Theatre, while Dowling was affiliated with the City Investing Company, both of which had a 40 percent ownership stake. Zeckendorf's company Webb and Knapp owned the remaining 20 percent of the theater.

The firm of Roche and Roche renovated the interior extensively, replacing the two balcony levels with a single balcony, as well as closing and sealing the Broadway entrance. In addition, the original decorations were largely eliminated and replaced with 18th-century design details. The renovated theater had a plexiglass marquee on 46th Street with scalloped decorations, under which was a black-and-white sidewalk. When the theater was purchased, it was supposed to reopen in January 1958. The premiere attraction was planned to be the musical Zuleika, which was then swapped with Shakespeare's Much Ado About Nothing. In February 1958, the Globe was renamed in honor of Alfred Lunt and Lynn Fontanne, who planned to retire after the inaugural show at the theater.

The Lunt-Fontanne Theatre opened on May 5, 1958, with Friedrich Dürrenmatt's The Visit, starring Lunt and Fontanne. Dowling, Stevens, and Whitehead had been threatened with a fine if they had not opened Visit by May 5. This production was the last one to feature Lunt and Fontanne on Broadway. Later that year, Zeckendorf's company Webb and Knapp sold the former entrance building at 1555 Broadway to the Rubinstein-Klein Realty Corporation. The revival of Much Ado About Nothing, with John Gielgud and Margaret Leighton, opened in 1959. It was followed the same year by the Rodgers and Hammerstein musical The Sound of Music, which had 1,443 performances during the next three years, including some at the Mark Hellinger Theatre.

==== 1960s to 1980s ====
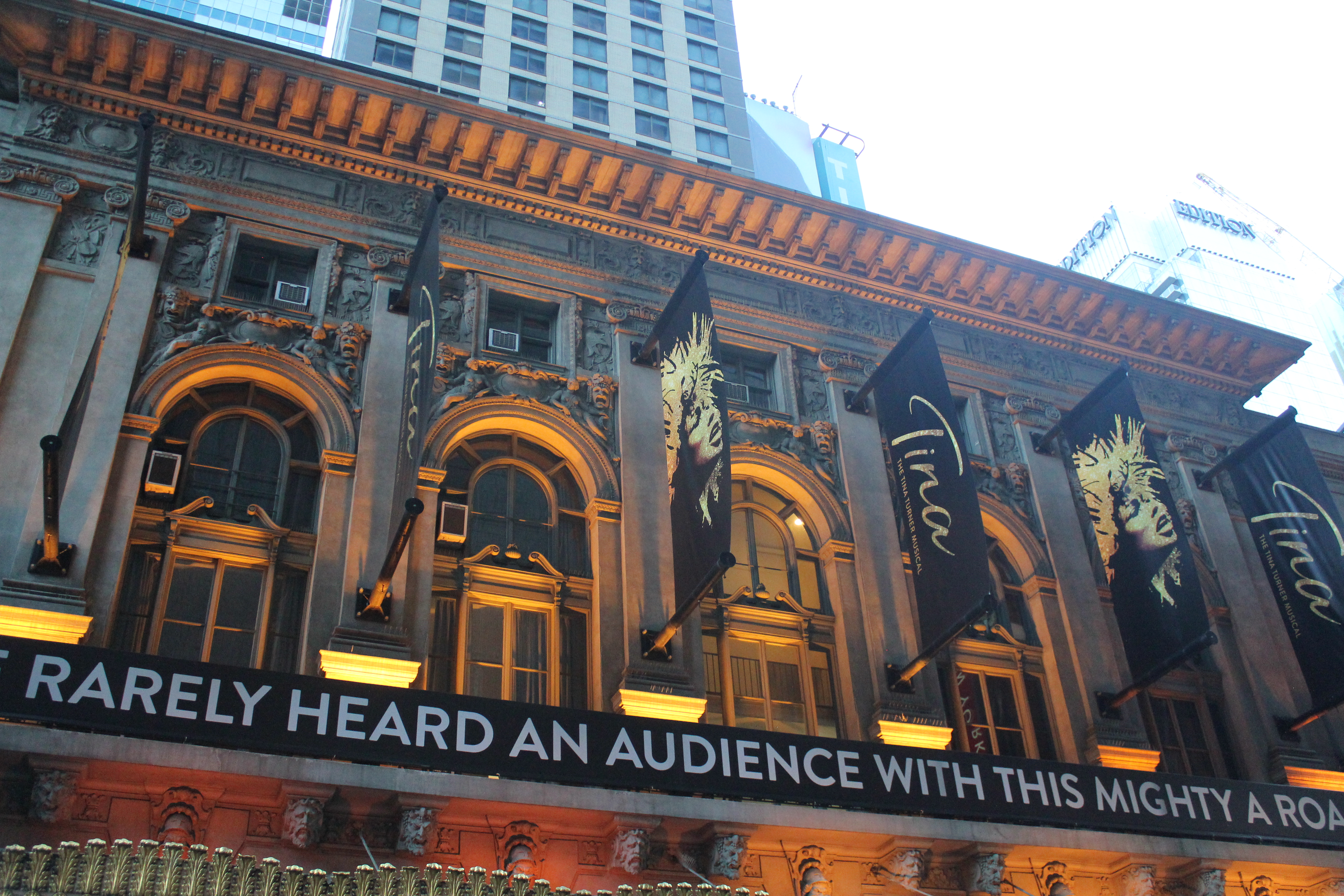
Viewed from across 46th Street

In 1960, City Playhouses leased the theater to producers Cy Feuer and Ernest H. Martin for $2 million. The musical Little Me with Sid Caesar opened in 1962; in spite of critical acclaim, the musical's run ended early due to a newspaper strike. The following year, Martha Graham and her dance company performed at the Globe. Richard Burton appeared in a revival of Hamlet in 1964, the longest run of the play on Broadway; it was followed by several short musical runs. Feuer and Martin obtained total control of the Lunt-Fontanne the same year, when they bought the remaining ownership stake from the Kratter Corporation for $1 million. The partners sold the Lunt-Fontanne to developer Stanley Stahl in 1965. That year, the theater staged Skyscraper with Julie Harris's first musical appearance, followed in 1966 by Walking Happy with Norman Wisdom.

Shows of the late 1960s included Marlene Dietrich's Broadway debut in 1967, followed the same year by How Now, Dow Jones. Another revival of Hamlet was staged at the Lunt-Fontanne in 1969, this time with Nicol Williamson. The theater then underwent a renovation and was leased for one year by Lester Osterman. Afterward, Hal Linden and Keene Curtis starred in the musical The Rothschilds. The Nederlander Organization started operating the Lunt-Fontanne Theatre in 1973. For much of that decade, the Lunt-Fontanne staged many revivals. Among them were A Funny Thing Happened on the Way to the Forum in 1972, The Pajama Game in 1973, Hello, Dolly! in 1978, and Peter Pan in 1979. The theater also hosted original productions during the 1970s, such as Rex in 1976.

In 1981, Duke Ellington's revue Sophisticated Ladies opened at the Lunt-Fontanne, running for 767 performances. This was followed by two revivals staged in 1983 by Zev Buffman: Private Lives and The Corn Is Green. In addition, Peggy Lee made her Broadway premiere the same year in a limited solo engagement. This was followed by a revival of The Wiz in 1984, and Jerry Weintraub purchased a stake in the operation of the Lunt-Fontanne the same year. A revival of The Iceman Cometh followed in 1985. The originals Uptown... It's Hot! and Smile were staged in 1986, as well as a transfer of The Gospel at Colonus in 1988. In addition to these, the Lunt-Fontanne hosted special appearances, including illusionist Doug Henning (1984); Grateful Dead vocalist Jerry Garcia (1987); rock band Joan Jett and the Blackhearts (1989); and singer Freddie Jackson (1989). Stahl and James M. Nederlander considered leasing out the Lunt-Fontanne as a movie theater in 1989, citing a downturn in theatrical bookings; The Threepenny Opera opened later that year. The theater also hosted the 43rd Tony Awards in 1989, followed the next year by the 44th Tony Awards.

The New York City Landmarks Preservation Commission (LPC) had started to consider protecting the Lunt-Fontanne as a landmark in 1982, with discussions continuing over the next several years. The LPC designated the Lunt-Fontanne's facade as a landmark on December 8, 1987, but the modified interior was denied landmark status. This was part of the commission's wide-ranging effort in 1987 to grant landmark status to Broadway theaters. The New York City Board of Estimate ratified the designations in March 1988. The Nederlanders, the Shuberts, and Jujamcyn collectively sued the LPC in June 1988 to overturn the landmark designations of 22 theaters, including the Lunt-Fontanne, on the merit that the designations severely limited the extent to which the theaters could be modified. The lawsuit was escalated to the New York Supreme Court and the Supreme Court of the United States, but these designations were ultimately upheld in 1992.

==== 1990s to present ====
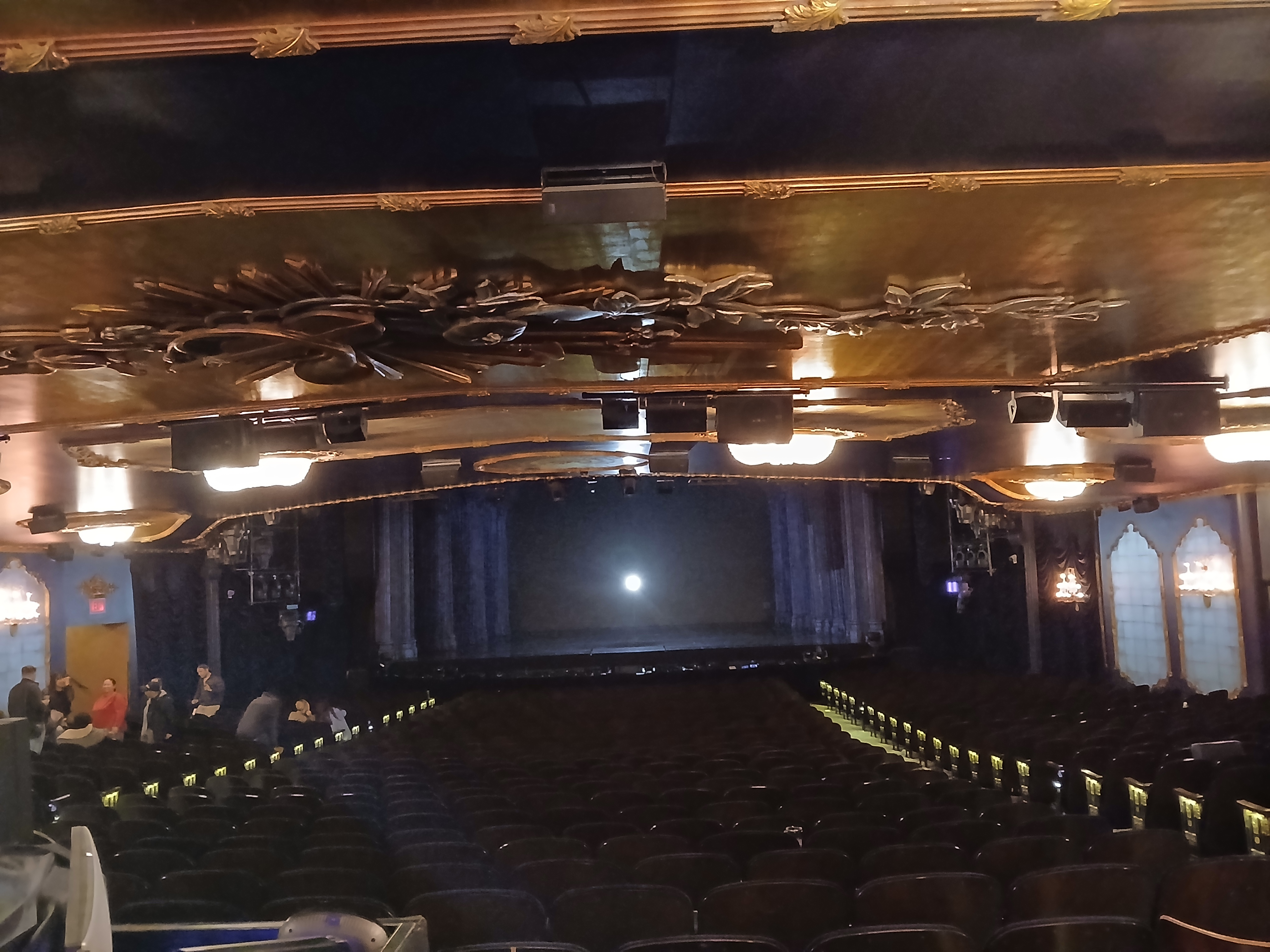
View underneath balcony from orchestra level

A second revival of Peter Pan, featuring Cathy Rigby, was staged at the Lunt-Fontanne in 1990, as was a concert by Harry Connick Jr. A 1991 transfer of Oh, Kay! closed during previews; The comedy Catskills on Broadway opened later the same year and ran for 13 months; multiple box-office employees were suspended after stealing ticket revenue from the show. Several flops were then staged at the Lunt-Fontanne, including the musical Ain't Broadway Grand in 1993, as well as The Best Little Whorehouse Goes Public and Comedy Tonight in 1994. Carol Channing, who had previously performed at the Lunt-Fontanne during the 1978 revival of Hello, Dolly!, returned for another revival in 1995, which ran 118 performances. The Royal Shakespeare Company produced A Midsummer Night's Dream in 1996, and the Sovremennik Theatre had eight Russian-language performances of two productions later that year.

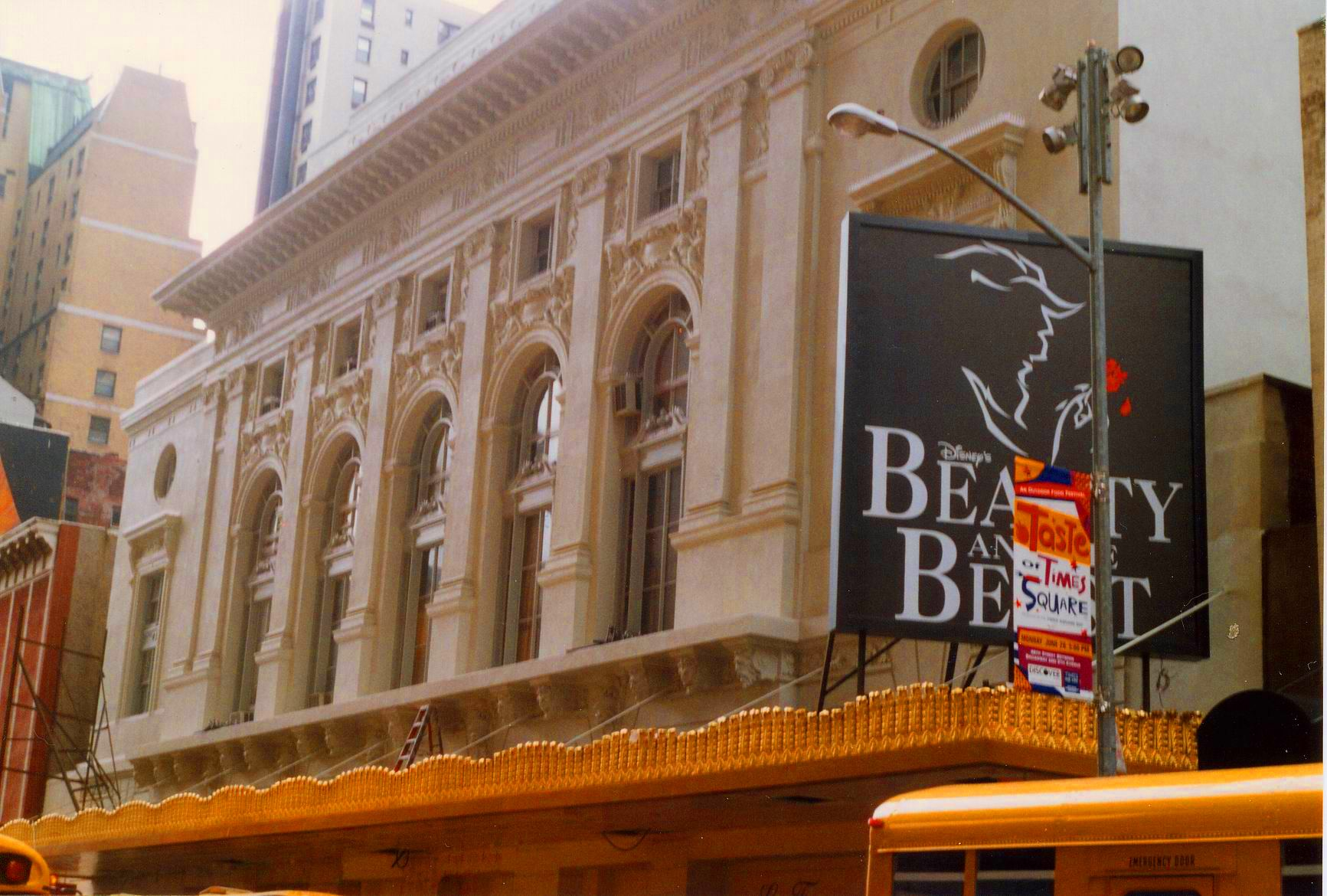
The theater, staging Beauty and the Beast

The musical Titanic opened in 1997 and was a hit, earning enough money to fund renovations of the theater. In addition, the theater's owners sold some air rights to the developers of the neighboring Planet Hollywood Hotel in 1998. After Titanic's run ended in March 1999, the theater was closed for much of the year while Sachs Morgan Studio renovated it, changing the lighting and paint scheme. The Planet Hollywood Hotel was being built during the same time, requiring contractors on that hotel to carefully monitor the Lunt-Fontanne for damage. Beauty and the Beast opened at the Lunt-Fontanne in late 1999, transferring from the Palace Theatre with a downsized cast, and ran until 2007. The Lunt-Fontanne was again renovated, and the bar area was demolished and rebuilt to accommodate a new building to the east. The Lunt-Fontanne reopened later that year with preview performances of The Little Mermaid, which officially opened in 2008 and ran until 2009.

The Lunt-Fontanne generally hosted shorter musicals and appearances in the 2010s. These included The Addams Family in 2010 and 2011; Ghost the Musical and A Christmas Story: The Musical in 2012; Motown: The Musical from 2013 to 2015; and Finding Neverland in 2015. As part of a settlement with the United States Department of Justice in 2014, the Nederlanders agreed to improve disabled access at their nine Broadway theaters, including the Lunt-Fontanne. The theater hosted a limited engagement by Frankie Valli & the Four Seasons and Kristin Chenoweth's solo My Love Letter to Broadway in 2016; the musical Charlie and the Chocolate Factory in 2017; and Summer: The Donna Summer Musical in 2018. Numerous performers had limited engagements at the Lunt-Fontanne in 2019 before the opening of Tina that November. Tina set the theater's box-office record in December 2019, grossing $1,834,339 across eight performances.

The theater closed on March 12, 2020, due to the COVID-19 pandemic, reopening on October 8, 2021, with performances of Tina, which ran until August 2022. A revival of Sweeney Todd starring Josh Groban and Annaleigh Ashford opened at the theater in early 2023 and concluded its run in May 2024. Death Becomes Her opened at the theater in November 2024 and closed in June 2026 after over 650 performances. This was followed by a limited engagement of the Blue Man Group's show, A New Holiday Surprise, which is playing at the theater from November 2026 through January 2027. A stage adaptation of The Warriors is scheduled to open at the Lunt-Fontanne in April 2027.

== Notable productions ==
Productions are listed by the year of their first performance. This list only includes Broadway shows; it does not include films screened at the theater. No theatrical productions were hosted between 1936 and 1958.

=== Globe Theatre ===
Notable productions at the theater
| Opening year | Name | Refs. |
|---|---|---|
| 1910 | The Girl in the Train | |
| 1911 | A Gentleman of Leisure | |
| 1913 | Mlle. Modiste | |
| 1915 | Stop! Look! Listen! | |
| 1916 | Betty | |
| 1918 | Hitchy-Koo | |
| 1918 | Ziegfeld Follies of 1918 | |
| 1920 | George White's Scandals of 1920 | |
| 1921 | Ziegfeld Follies of 1921 | |
| 1922 | George White's Scandals of 1922 | |
| 1922 | The Bunch and Judy | |
| 1923 | George White's Scandals of 1923 | |
| 1923 | Stepping Stones | |
| 1925 | Aren't We All? | |
| 1925 | No, No, Nanette | |
| 1926 | Criss Cross | |
| 1928 | Three Cheers | |
| 1931 | The Cat and the Fiddle | |

=== Lunt-Fontanne Theatre ===
Notable productions at the theater
| Opening year | Name | Refs. |
|---|---|---|
| 1958 | The Visit | |
| 1958 | Goldilocks | |
| 1959 | Les Ballets Africains | |
| 1959 | Much Ado About Nothing | |
| 1959 | The Sound of Music | |
| 1962 | Little Me | |
| 1963 | Arturo Ui | |
| 1964 | Luther | |
| 1964 | Hamlet | |
| 1964 | Wiener Blut | |
| 1964 | Ben Franklin in Paris | |
| 1965 | Bajour | |
| 1965 | Skyscraper | |
| 1966 | Walking Happy | |
| 1967 | Marlene Dietrich | |
| 1967 | How Now, Dow Jones | |
| 1968 | Her First Roman | |
| 1968 | You Know I Can't Hear You When the Water's Running | |
| 1969 | Come Summer | |
| 1969 | Hamlet | |
| 1969 | La Strada | |
| 1970 | Look to the Lilies | |
| 1970 | The Rothschilds | |
| 1972 | A Funny Thing Happened on the Way to the Forum | |
| 1972 | Ambassador | |
| 1973 | 6 Rms Riv Vu | |
| 1973 | The Pajama Game | |
| 1974 | The Sunshine Boys | |
| 1975 | Raisin | |
| 1976 | Rex | |
| 1976 | My Fair Lady | |
| 1977 | Primitive Mysteries | |
| 1977 | The Shadow Box | |
| 1978 | Hello, Dolly! | |
| 1978 | A Broadway Musical | |
| 1979 | Beatlemania | |
| 1979 | Peter Pan | |
| 1981 | Sophisticated Ladies | |
| 1983 | Private Lives | |
| 1983 | The Corn Is Green | |
| 1984 | The Wiz | |
| 1985 | The Iceman Cometh | |
| 1986 | Uptown... It's Hot! | |
| 1986 | Smile | |
| 1988 | The Gospel at Colonus | |
| 1989 | The Threepenny Opera | |
| 1990 | Peter Pan | |
| 1991 | Oh, Kay! | |
| 1994 | The Best Little Whorehouse Goes Public | |
| 1995 | Hello, Dolly! | |
| 1996 | Three Sisters | |
| 1996 | A Midsummer Night's Dream | |
| 1997 | Titanic | |
| 1999 | Beauty and the Beast | |
| 2008 | The Little Mermaid | |
| 2010 | The Addams Family | |
| 2012 | Ghost the Musical | |
| 2012 | A Christmas Story: The Musical | |
| 2013 | Motown: The Musical | |
| 2015 | Finding Neverland | |
| 2016 | Frankie Valli and the Four Seasons on Broadway! | |
| 2016 | Kristin Chenoweth: My Love Letter to Broadway | |
| 2017 | Charlie and the Chocolate Factory | |
| 2018 | Summer: The Donna Summer Musical | |
| 2019 | Morrissey | |
| 2019 | Pure Yanni | |
| 2019 | Mel Brooks on Broadway | |
| 2019 | Regina Spektor: Live On Broadway | |
| 2019 | Criss Angel Raw—The Mindfreak Unplugged | |
| 2019 | Dave Chappelle on Broadway | |
| 2019 | Manilow Broadway | |
| 2019 | Tina: The Musical | |
| 2023 | Sweeney Todd | |
| 2024 | Death Becomes Her | |
| 2026 | Blue Man Group: A New Holiday Surprise | |
| 2027 | The Warriors | |

== See also ==
- List of Broadway theaters
- List of New York City Designated Landmarks in Manhattan from 14th to 59th Streets
