= Charles Collins (actor) =

American singer and actor (1904–1999)

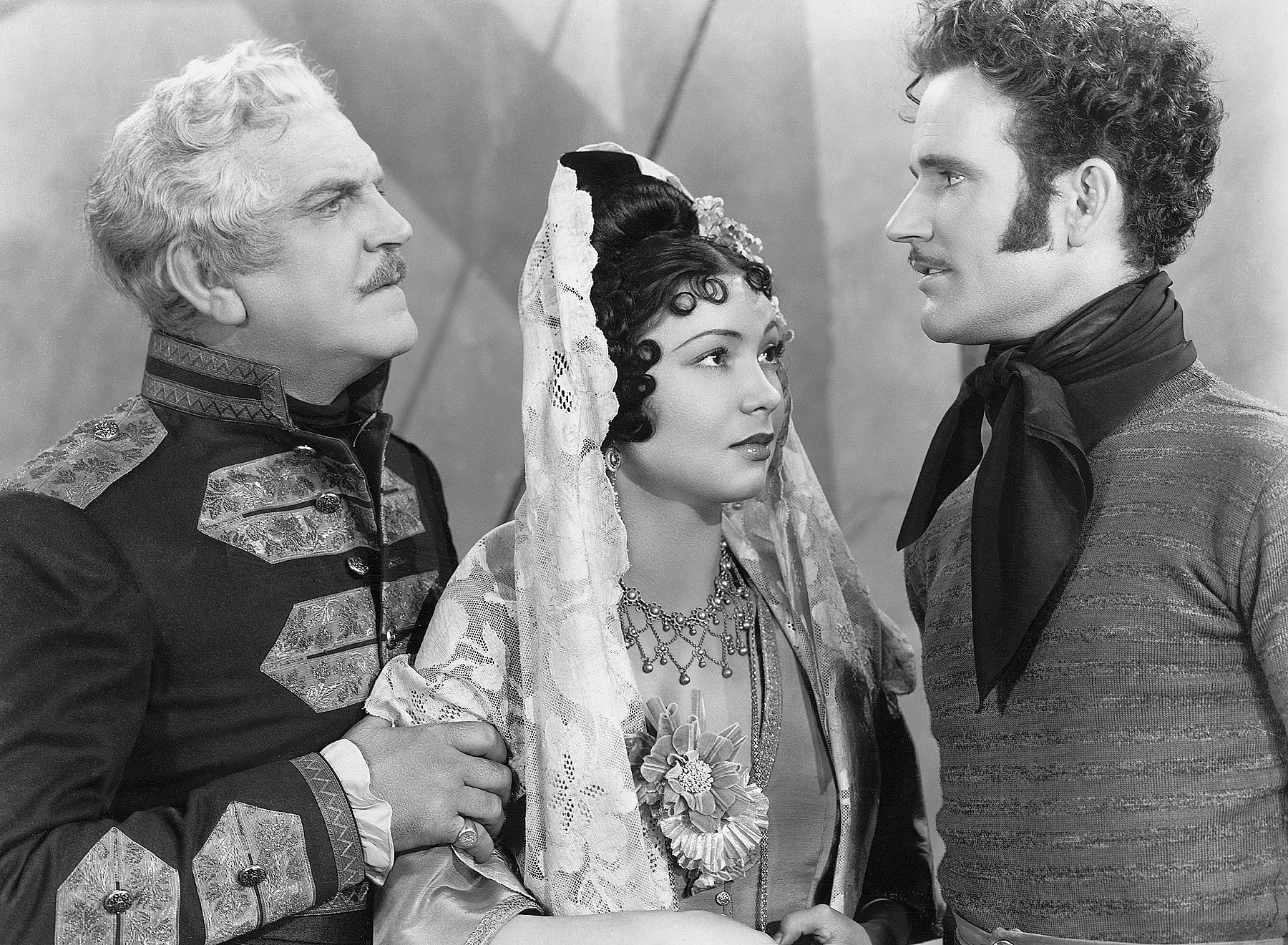
- Frank Morgan, Steffi Duna and Collins in Dancing Pirate (1936)
- Born: January 7, 1904; Frederick, Oklahoma
- Died: June 26, 1999 (aged 95); Montecito, California

Charles Clyde Collins (7 January 1904 – 26 June 1999) was an American singer and actor. He was particularly known for his work within musical comedy, between Broadway, films and television series.

== Biography ==
Collins made his Broadway debut in 1927 in Harry Akst's Artists and Models. He went on to star in several Broadway productions during the 1930s, including Ripples (1930), where he met Dorothy Stone. He married Dorothy in London on 14 September 1931.

He starred in Smiling Faces (1932), Say When (1935), Conjur Man Dies (1936), Macbeth (1936), and Sea Legs (1937) (with Dorothy). During this time he also began to appear in Hollywood musical films beginning with Shave It with Music in 1932 (with Dorothy). His other film roles during this decade included the roles of Baxter in Paree, Paree (1934) (with Dorothy Stone and Bob Hope), and Jonathan Pride in Dancing Pirate (1936). He also recorded music for the 1934 film Those Were the Days.

Collins appeared in two films during the 1940s: Syncopation (1942) and Swing Hostess (1944). He recorded the song "Don't Dilly Dally on the Way" for the 1946 film London Town. He returned to Broadway in 1945 to portray Boris Kolenkhov in You Can't Take It with You (with Dorothy Stone and Fred Stone), and again in 1947 to portray Gaston in The Red Mill (with Dorothy). In 1951 he made his first television appearance as a guest star on the Adventures of Wild Bill Hickok program. He appeared in small parts in three more films during the 1950s, Confidence Girl (1952), The Steel Trap (1952), and A Blueprint for Murder (1953), after which his career considerably slowed down.

After an absence from Broadway of more than 25 years, Collins returned to New York in 1973 for his final Broadway appearance in the musical Shelter. He later served as the stage manager for the Broadway musical Platinum.
