= Paree, Paree =

- Directed by: Roy Mack
- Written by: Cyrus Wood; E. Ray Goetz; Herbert Fields
- Produced by: Samuel Sax
- Starring: Bob Hope; Dorothy Stone
- Cinematography: Ray Foster
- Distributed by: Warner Brothers
- Release date: September 8, 1934
- Running time: 21 minutes
- Country: United States
- Language: English

Paree, Paree is a 1934 black-and-white Vitaphone musical short starring Bob Hope and Dorothy Stone. Cole Porter wrote the lyrics and music for this musical comedy short.

== Premise ==
A wealthy man (Bob Hope) makes a bet with his friends that he could win a girl (Dorothy Stone) without her knowing of his riches.

== Cast ==
- Bob Hope as Peter Forbes
- Dorothy Stone as Lulu Carroll
- Billie Leonard as Violet
- Rodney McLennan as Michael Cummings (credited as Rodney McLennon)
- Charles Collins as Baxter
- Charles La Torre as Flower Vendor

== Songs ==
Four of the songs in this short were first used in Porter's 1929 Broadway musical Fifty Million Frenchmen, then in the 1931 film adaptation of the same name, which was filmed in Technicolor.

- "Paree, What Did You Do to Me" – Female singer
- "You Don't Know Paree" – Orchestra
- "You Do Something to Me" – Peter and Lulu
- "Find Me a Primitive Man" – Violet
- "You've Got That Thing" – Peter
- Finale: "You've Got That Thing" (reprise) – Company

These songs were from Fifty Million Frenchmen.

== Home media ==
This short was released on DVD in the special features of the MGM movie musical Silk Stockings (1957).
