= Under the Top =

1919 film by Donald Crisp

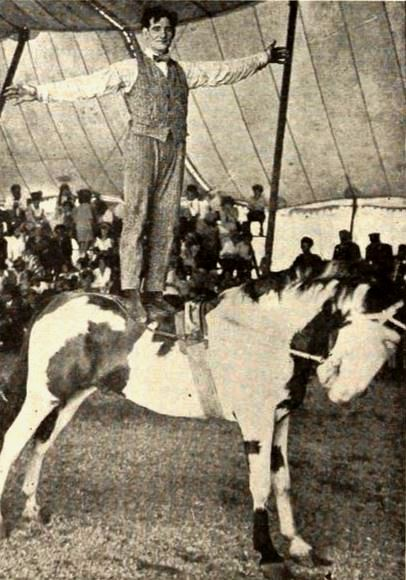
- Film still with Stone
- Directed by: Donald Crisp
- Screenplay by: John Emerson; Gardner Hunting; Anita Loos
- Produced by: Jesse L. Lasky
- Starring: Fred Stone; Ella Hall; Lester Le May; Sylvia Ashton; James Cruze; Guy Oliver
- Cinematography: Henry Kotani
- Production companies: Artcraft Pictures Corporation; Famous Players–Lasky Corporation
- Distributed by: Paramount Pictures
- Release date: January 5, 1919
- Running time: 50 minutes
- Country: United States
- Language: Silent (English intertitles)

Under the Top is a 1919 American silent comedy film directed by Donald Crisp, written by John Emerson, Gardner Hunting, and Anita Loos, and starring Fred Stone, Ella Hall, Lester Le May, Sylvia Ashton, James Cruze, and Guy Oliver. It was released on January 5, 1919, by Paramount Pictures.

Only a fragment of this film has managed to survive.

== Cast ==
- Fred Stone as Jimmie Jones
- Ella Hall as Pansy O'Neill
- Lester Le May as Terry O'Neill
- Sylvia Ashton as Lotta Crust
- James Cruze as 'Foxy' Stillmore
- Guy Oliver as Jay Trimmer
- Charles Stanton Ogle as Otto B. Shott
- Noah Beery, Sr. as Prof. De Como
- J. Cummings as Justice of the Peace
- Jane Wolfe as Mrs. Jones
- Julia N. Stark as Wardrobe lady
