= Paula Stone =

American actress

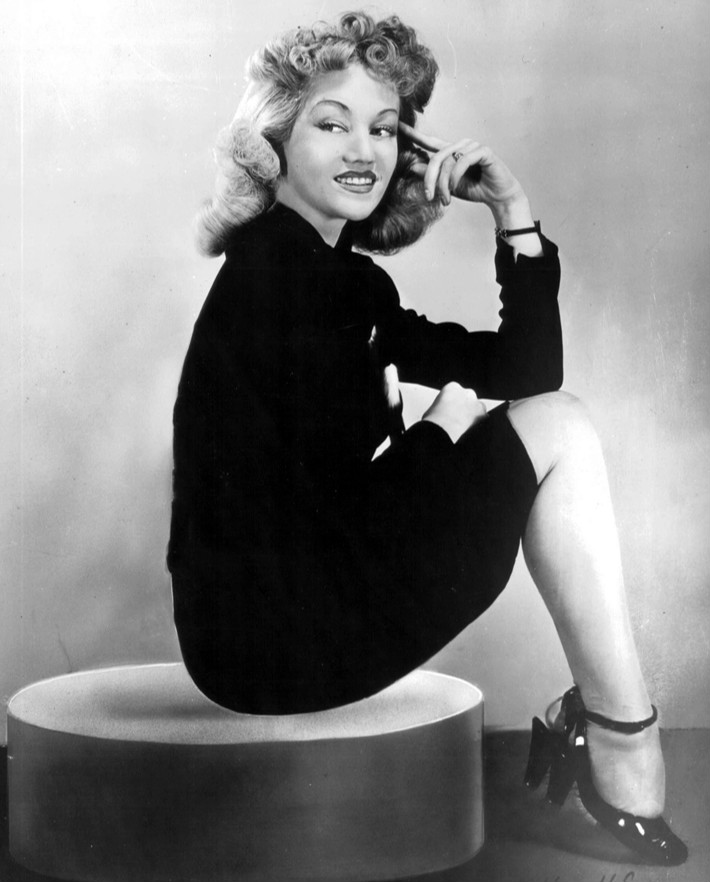
- Stone in 1945
- Born: January 20, 1912; New York City, U.S.
- Died: December 23, 1997 (aged 85); Sherman Oaks, California, U.S.
- Occupation: Actress
- Years active: 1935-1971
- Spouse(s): Michael Sloan; Duke Daly (1939-1943) (his death)
- Children: 2
- Parents: Fred Stone (father); Allene Crater (mother)

Paula Stone (January 20, 1912 – December 23, 1997) was an American theater and motion pictures actress from New York City.

== Early life ==
She was the daughter of Fred Stone, a stage actor, dancing comedian, and owner of the Fred Stone theatrical stock company. Her mother, Allene Crater Stone, acted with her father and was a singer. The family had a ranch near Lyme, Connecticut, as well as a home in Forest Hills, Queens, New York.

== Theater ==
Stone made her debut in May 1925, at the Illinois Theater in Chicago, Illinois, in Stepping Stones. She was 13 years old. Her sister Dorothy Stone made her stage debut at 16. Dorothy performed with Fred Stone at the Globe Theater in Manhattan in Criss-Cross in December 1926. Stone was then 14 and training to be a stage actress within two years. Her first ambition was to be a singer like her mother. Another sister, Carol (age 12), also aspired to go into theater work.

Stone appeared with Fred and Dorothy in Ripples, a show which debuted in New Haven, Connecticut, in January 1930. The first New York show of the same production came at the New Amsterdam Theater in February. Stone and her father teamed in Smiling Faces, produced by the Shubert Theater owners in 1931. Mack Gordon and Harry Revel wrote the music and lyrics. The musical had its first night in Springfield, Massachusetts.

Stone toured in You Can't Take It With You, Idiots Delight, and other plays. In November 1940 she was cast with Marcy Wescott for the Dennis King musical show. It debuted at the Forrest Theater in Philadelphia, Pennsylvania.

When her husband was reported missing during World War II, Stone began doing camp and canteen shows with her father. The two collaborated again in a play produced by the Theatre Guild in September 1950.

Stone produced Sweethearts, Carnival in Flanders, Rumple, The Rain Prince and The Red Mill. She and Michael Sloane co-produced the Broadway musical Top Banana (1951).

== Films ==
She signed with RKO Radio for a singing and dancing role in a musical in May 1935. Her second motion picture role featured her opposite Dick Foran in Treachery Rides The Range (1936), a Warner Bros. release. The movie sought to illustrate injustices perpetrated by buffalo traders against Cheyenne Indians. Foran and Stone provided the romantic interest. Her first motion picture paired her with William Boyd in Hop-Along Cassidy (1935).

She had the role of Mabel, best friend of the leading lady Pearl, in The Girl Said No (1937). The movie was directed by Andrew L. Stone and received an Academy Award nomination. Her final motion picture was Laugh It Off (1939), a musical released by Universal Pictures.

== Radio ==
Stone took singing lessons. She was hired by WNEW in New York City, to broadcast the news and gossip of Broadway to servicemen. She wrote the scripts for this program and later secured her own show on the Mutual Radio Network called Leave It to the Girls, a program that would allow a panel of quick-witted women to discuss problems and issues sent in by listeners. Stone served as moderator, and Girls ran for four years on the Mutual network, finishing its run in 1949. In 1950 she hosted Hollywood USA. The show related entertainment news and she interviewed celebrities. On June 9, 1952, she debuted the Paula Stone Show on the Mutual Broadcasting System. She sought to mix her own knowledge of Hollywood people with interviews of celebrities, including Dennis Morgan, Johnnie Ray, Joan Crawford, Carlton Carpenter, and Debbie Reynolds.

== Television ==
In 1954 Stone worked for Broadway Angels, Inc., in New York City. She was the MC of Angel Auditions, a television show which examined prospective Broadway shows. The plays were tried in summer stock and considered for production on Broadway.

== Marriage ==
Stone wed orchestra leader Duke Daly (whose real name was Linwood A. Dingley) on July 16, 1939, at the Wilshire Methodist Church in Los Angeles. Daly, 30, resided in Miami, Florida, before moving to Beverly Hills in June 1939. He joined the Canadian RAF in January 1942 and flew many missions over Germany before he was killed in action on the return leg of a nighttime bombing raid over Duisburg, Germany, on May 13, 1943. Stone later married Michael Sloane in 1946. She had a son and a daughter.

Stone died on December 23, 1997, at Sherman Oaks Medical Center in Sherman Oaks, California, aged 85.

== Filmography ==
Year	Title	Role	Notes
1935	Hop-Along Cassidy	Mary Meeker	
1936	Two Against the World	Miss Symonds	
1936	Treachery Rides the Range	Ruth Drummond	
1936	The Case of the Velvet Claws	Norma Veite	
1936	Trailin' West	Lucy Blake	
1936	Red Lights Ahead	Edna Wallace	
1937	Swing It, Professor	Teddy Ross	
1937	Atlantic Flight	Gail Strong	
1937	The Girl Said No	Mabel	
1938	Convicts at Large	Ruth Porter	
1939	Idiot's Delight	Les Blondes - Beulah	
1939	Laugh It Off	Linda Lane	

== Notes ==
- "Film and Drama". Long Beach Press-Telegram. September 23, 1950. p. 10.
- "Walter Winchell On Broadway". Nevada State Journal. October 14, 1952. p. 4.
- "Rialto Gossip". New York Times. May 17, 1925. p. X1.
- "Some Advantages Of Having Relatives". New York Times. December 5, 1926. p. X9.
- "Fred Stone Falls In A Solo Flight; Breaks Both Legs". New York Times. August 4, 1928. p. 1.
- "Fred Stone Bounces Back In Ripples". New York Times. January 29, 1930. p. 30.
- "Jests Of Airplane Mishap". New York Times. February 12, 1930. p. 29.
- "Theatrical Notes". New York Times. September 17, 1931. p. 21.
- "Screen Notes". New York Times. May 25, 1935. p. 12.
- "The Screen". New York Times. May 30, 1936. p. 7.
- "News Of The Screen". New York Times. March 1, 1937. p. 15.
- "Paula Stone To Be Married". New York Times. August 6, 1937. p. 21.
- "Paula Stone To Be Wed". New York Times. July 13, 1939. p. 22.
- "Engaged For Dennis King Show". New York Times. November 13, 1940. p. 28.
- "Paula Stone And Phil Brito Are Heard On KPAC". Port Arthur News. August 28, 1945. p. 28.
