= Smiling Faces =

Smiling Faces is an American musical with music by Harry Revel, lyrics by Mack Gordon (and additionally, for the song "Do Say You Do", by Harold Adamson), and a musical book by Harry Clarke. Produced by Lee Shubert and Jacob J. Shubert, the production opened on Broadway at the Shubert Theatre where it ran from August 30, 1932, through September 24, 1932, for a total of 31 performances. The cast included Dorothy Stone as Peggy Post, Roy Royston as Robert Bowington, Fred Stone as Monument Spleen, Adora Andrews as Cordonia Potts, Charles Collins as Arthur Lawrence, Hope Emerson as Amy Edwards, Doris Patston as Mildred McKay, Barbara Williams as Helen Sydney, Eddie Garvey as Edward Richter, Isabel O'Madigan as Sybilla Richter, Ali Yousuff as Horatio Dalrymple, and Bradford Hatton as George Black.

Smiling Faces is set at the home of Robert Bowington in Southampton, New York on Long Island; a ballroom at a country club; and at the Grand Hotel in Havana, Cuba. The plot centers around Peggy Post, a film actress making a movie on Long Island, as she attempts to marry well in order to attract the attention of a second potential suitor who is her true romantic target.
