= Dancing Pirate =

1936 film by Lloyd Corrigan

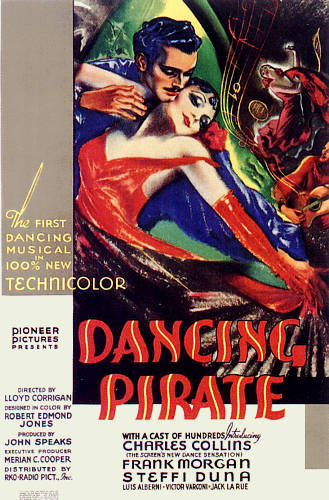
- Poster
- Directed by: Lloyd Corrigan
- Written by: Ray Harris (screenplay); Francis Edward Faragoh (screenplay); Jack Wagner (adaptation); Boris Ingster (adaptation); Emma-Lindsay Squier (story)
- Produced by: Merian C. Cooper (executive producer); John Speaks (producer)
- Starring: See below
- Cinematography: William V. Skall
- Edited by: Archie Marshek
- Music by: Alfred Newman; Richard Rodgers & Lorenz Hart (songs)
- Production company: Pioneer Pictures
- Distributed by: RKO Pictures
- Release date: May 22, 1936
- Running time: 83 minutes
- Country: United States
- Language: English

Dancing Pirate is a 1936 American musical comedy film directed by Lloyd Corrigan. It is the second film shot in the three strip Technicolor process and the first musical in that format. Produced by the makers of Becky Sharp, the film was based on the December 1930 Colliers Magazine story Glorious Buccaneer by Emma-Lindsay Squier a serious and action filled romance that may have been inspired by the story of Joseph Chapman. The film features the debut of stage star Charles Collins and the cast includes Rita Hayworth as one of The Royal Cansino Dancers. Other dancers in the film were Pat Nixon and Marjorie Reynolds.

The film is set in the 1820s. A dance teacher from Boston is enslaved by pirates, but escapes when the pirate ship lands in Spanish California. The local authorities mistake him for a pirate and sentence him to death. His execution is delayed in order for him to give dance lessons to the local women. When disgruntled former soldiers turn to banditry, the captive teacher counters their efforts by orchestrating a revolt of the indigenous peoples of California.

== Plot ==
Set in Boston in the 1820s, the film tells of dance teacher Jonathan Pride, shanghaied by pirates and forced to be a slave aboard his own ship. Jonathan is able to join a provisioning party that lands on the coast of California, then a part of the Spanish Empire where he makes his escape; his only possessions being his umbrella and music box that he uses for his dancing lessons.

He is seen by a shepherd who warns the nearest town whose excitable population transform Jonathan's arrival into a full-fledged pirate invasion. The Alcalde Don Emilio Perena leads the militia into shooting up their own town whilst Jonathan is later captured in the boudoir of the Alcade's daughter Serafina. Jonathan is sentenced to death.

When Serafina and the women of the town discover Jonathan's profession of dancing teacher, his execution is delayed until he teaches the waltz to the women of the town.

Meanwhile, Serafina's suitor Don Balthazar, a Captain of the Guards of the Presidio of Monterey, and some of his soldiers visit the town to not only marry Serafina and Don Balthazar, but unbeknownst to the town he has been cashiered from the Army along with his men who seek to loot the town. Don Balthazar also plans on secretly executing his rival Jonathan.

Jonathan makes his escape and motivates the local downtrodden but peaceful Native Americans into an uprising through teaching them a torrid war dance. The Native Americans use their only weapons, their lassoes, to capture the former soldiers who are now bandits. Don Balthazar challenges Jonathan to a duel with swords but Jonathan employs his dancing skills and his umbrella to defeat and capture the Don.

== Cast ==
- Charles Collins as Jonathan Pride
- Frank Morgan as Mayor Don Emilio Perena
- Steffi Duna as Serafina Perena
- Luis Alberni as Pamfilo (the Jailer)
- Victor Varconi as Don Balthazar (Monterey Captain of the Guards)
- Jack La Rue as Lt. Chago (Baltazar's Aide)
- Alma Real as Blanca (Serafina's Maid)
- William V. Mong as Tecolote (Old Indian)
- Mitchell Lewis as Pirate Chief
- Julian Rivero as Shepherd
- John Eberts as Mozo
- The Royal Cansino Dancers as Dancers
- Rita Hayworth as Specialty Dancer (uncredited)

== Soundtrack ==
- Charles Collins, Steffi Duna and chorus - "When You're Dancing the Waltz" (By Richard Rodgers and Lorenz Hart)
- Steffi Duna - "Are You My Love?" (Music by Richard Rodgers, lyrics by Lorenz Hart)

== Home Media ==
A restored color version of the film was released on DVD by Film Masters on April 14, 2026.
