= Carol Stone (actress) =

American actress (1915–2011)

- Stone in 1944
- Born: Carol Montgomery Stone; 1 February 1915; New York City, U.S.
- Died: 10 June 2011 (aged 96); Altadena, California, U.S.
- Occupation: Actress
- Years active: 1934–1963
- Spouse: Robert W. McCahon (m. 1940; div. 1950)
- Parents: Fred Stone (father); Allene Crater (mother)
- Relatives: Dorothy Stone (sister); Paula Stone (sister)

Carol Montgomery Stone (February 1, 1915 – June 10, 2011) was an actress who played "Big Nose Kate",or Kate Holliday, the common-law wife of Doc Holliday, in ten episodes in the 1957–58 season of the ABC/Desilu western television series The Life and Legend of Wyatt Earp.

== Early years ==
Born in New York City, Stone was the youngest daughter of actor Fred Stone. Her mother was actress Allene Crater; her sisters, Dorothy Stone and Paula Stone. The author Rex Beach is her uncle. Her middle name came from her father's longtime comedy partner David C. Montgomery.

Although Stone came from a "family tradition of musical comedy", seeing a production of Elizabeth the Queen in 1930 turned her focus to more serious acting. From 1930 to 1933 she studied acting with Frances Robinson-Duff, who taught the Delsarte acting technique.

== Career ==
Stone's stage debut occurred on July 20, 1933, in a production of Mr. Prohack at the John Drew Memorial Theatre in East Hampton, Long Island. Her New York debut came in November 1933 in Spring in Autumn at Henry Miller's Theatre. She played in stock theater in New England and in the metropolitan New York area.

Stone's TV debut came on January 2, 1951, when she appeared in Burlesque on CBS.

== Personal life ==
On July 31, 1940, Stone married Robert William McCahon at her father's home in Forest Hills, Queens, New York. He was the son of Mr. and Mrs. Thomas J. McCahon of Brookline, Massachusetts. They divorced in 1950 and had no children.
