= Dorothy Stone (actress) =

American actress

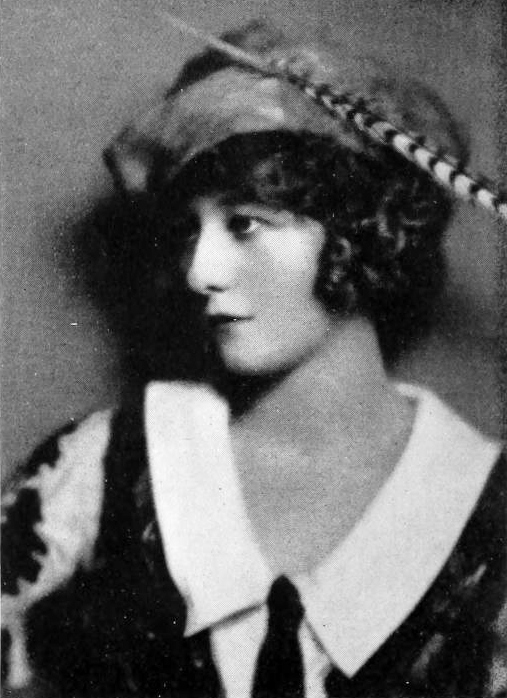
- Stone in Stepping Stones c. 1923
- Born: June 3, 1905; Brooklyn, New York, U.S.
- Died: September 24, 1974 (aged 69); Montecito, California, U.S.
- Occupations: Actress; singer; dancer
- Years active: early 1920s–1945
- Spouse: Charles Collins (1931 - )
- Parents: Fred Stone (father); Allene Crater (mother)
- Relatives: Paula Stone (sister); Carol Stone (sister)

Dorothy Stone (June 3, 1905 – September 24, 1974) (a/k/a Dorothy B. Stone and Dorothy Stone Collins) was an actress, dancer, and singer in theater and motion pictures, born in Brooklyn, New York.

== Early life ==
Born on June 3, 1905, Dorothy Stone was the daughter of Fred Stone, a stage actor, dancing comedian, and owner of the Fred Stone theatrical stock company. Her mother, Allene Crater, acted with her father and was a singer. Her parents were in agreement that she would be called Dorothy, after the main character in The Wonderful Wizard of Oz, in which her parents had performed in the 1902 musical version. Her sisters were Paula Stone and Carol Stone. The family had a ranch at Lyme, Connecticut.

Despite her mother not wishing for her to enter show-business, Stone entered the industry at an early age and in July, 1921, was thrown and kicked by a pony she rode in the second annual circus and Wild West show of the Lights Club, an organization composed of theatrical people living on Long Island. Dorothy, known as the "Queen of Chin Chin Ranch", was shaken up by her fall and bruised by kicks from the pony but not otherwise injured.

== Theater ==
Dorothy's Broadway debut was in 1923 in Jerome Kern’s Stepping Stones in which she played the character of Roughette Hood among a cast which included her father, Fred Stone (as Peter Plug), Oscar Ragland (as Otto DeWolfe), and Jack Whiting (as Captain Paul). She was a big hit in the show and The New York Times reported that the audience was cheering her before the first act was over.

Dorothy performed with her father again at the Globe Theater in Manhattan, in Criss Cross in October 1926. This was followed by Three Cheers in 1928 (with Will Rogers taking her father's place because of an airplane accident). The headline of the review by Brooks Atkinson in the New York Times read "Dorothy Stone Captivates as Dancer and Singer."

In August, 1929, when Ruby Keeler (Al Jolson's wife) had to withdraw due to illness from the cast of Ziegfeld's Show Girl, Dorothy took over to headlines that read "Dorothy Stone scores a hit on 'Show Girl' (...) receives an Ovation."

Dorothy next appeared with her father (having recovered from his accident), mother, and Paula (making her stage debut) in Ripples, a show which debuted in New Haven, Connecticut, in January 1930. The first New York production of the show came to the New Amsterdam Theater in February. As Brooks Atkinson of the New York Times reported, "Fred Stone is back."

Dorothy, Paula, and their father teamed in Smiling Faces, produced by the Shubert Theater owners in 1932. Mack Gordon and Harry Revel wrote the music and lyrics. The musical had its pre-Broadway tryout in Springfield, Massachusetts.

Dorothy took over the roles played by Marilyn Miller in the Irving Berlin musical, As Thousands Cheer in 1934. "She tossed them off with charm and with the sprightly air that is the trade-mark of the Stones."

With her husband, Charles Collins, Dorothy appeared in the musical comedy Sea Legs (1937), which got bad notices. About Charles and Dorothy, however, Brooks Atkinson said they "are an attractive couple with a neat gift for dancing."

She played Essie in the 1945 revival of You Can't Take It with You in which her father (at age 70) appeared as Martin Vanderhof, and her husband, Charles Collins, as Boris Kolenkhov.

She also appeared with her husband and Eddie Foy, Jr. in the revival of The Red Mill in 1945.

== Film career ==
Dorothy's first film was a short entitled Shave It With Music (1932), with her father Fred Stone. However, her next film, also a short, starred Bob Hope in his first credited role: Paree, Paree (1934), with songs by Cole Porter from Fifty Million Frenchmen.

Her other film credits include:

- Revolt of the Zombies (1936)
- Radio Hook Up (1938)
- Latin Hi-Hattin (1938)
- I'll Be Seeing You (1944)

== Personal life ==
In 1931, she married her dancing partner, Charles Collins, in London. She died at her home in Montecito, California, on September 24, 1974, at the age of 69.
