= Stepping Stones (musical) =

- Sheet Music Cover
- Music: Jerome Kern
- Lyrics: Anne Caldwell
- Book: Anne Caldwell and R. H. Burnside

Stepping Stones is a "fantastical musical play" (musical comedy) in two acts with book by Anne Caldwell and R. H. Burnside, lyrics by Anne Caldwell, and music by Jerome Kern. The show was produced by Charles Dillingham at the Globe Theater, and opened November 6, 1923.

The musical director was Victor Baravalle and the music was orchestrated by Robert Russell Bennett. The show was staged by R. H. Burnside and choreographed by Mary Read and John Tiller. Scenic design by Wilhelm, Robert McQuinn, and P. Dodd Ackerman. Costume design by Robert McQuinn, Wilhelm, Cora MacGeachy, Will R. Barnes, and Brooks-Mahieu Company. It ran for 281 performances, closing on October 4, 1924. The show was closed as a result of an actor's strike and then had touring performances on the road until 1926.

The cast headlined Fred Stone (Peter Plug), Dorothy Stone (Roughette Hood), Oscar Ragland (Otto DeWolfe), Evelyn Herbert (Lupina), and Jack Whiting (Captain Paul).

The plot is basically a musical comedy version of the adventures of Roughette Hood (i.e. Little Red Riding Hood) (Dorothy Stone) with Otto DeWolfe (Oscar Ragland), a villain. She is rescued from the villain in song, dance, and acrobatic comedy by Peter Plug (Fred Stone), an errand boy and wild plumber from the Pampas.

Gerald Boardman points out that, "Most critics devoted their opening paragraphs to extolling the seventeen-year-old Dorothy Stone. . . . [Fred] Stone's clowning and acrobatics were applauded (he parachuted down for his first entrance), and Dillingham's lavish, tasteful hand was complimented as well. . . . In the Herald Alexander Woollcott reported that the evening was 'abrim with sweet melodies by Jerome Kern...'"

In 1948, Helen Carroll and the Satisfiers released a new recording of "Raggedy Ann", one of the songs from the musical.

== Songs ==
Act 1

- "The Nursey Clock"
- "Little Angel Cake"
- "Because You Love the Singer"
- "Little Red Riding Hood"
- "Wonderful Dad"
- "Pie"
- "Babbling Babette"
- "In Love with Love"
- "The Wood Nymphs"
- "Our Lovely Rose" / "Wonderful Dad" Reprise

Act 2

- "Once in a Blue Moon"
- "Hold You Upon My Knee"
- "The Mystic Hussars"
- "The Skeleton Janitor"
- "Raggedy Ann"
- "Dear Little Peter Pan"
- "In Love with Love" Reprise / "Stepping Stones"
