= Fifty Million Frenchmen =

- A Musical Comedy Tour of Paris
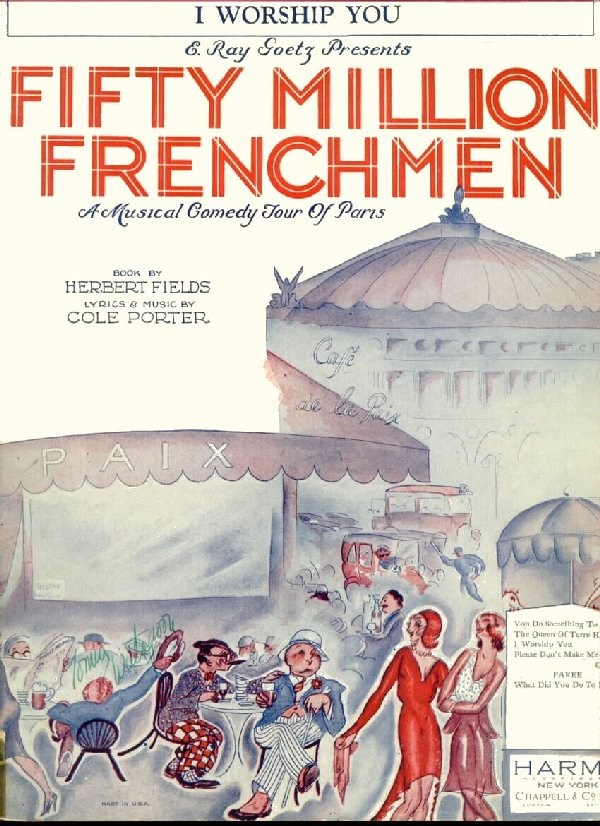
- Original sheet music cover
- Music: Cole Porter
- Lyrics: Cole Porter
- Book: Herbert Fields
- Productions: 1929 Broadway

Fifty Million Frenchmen is a musical comedy with a book by Herbert Fields and music and lyrics by Cole Porter. It opened on Broadway in 1929 and was adapted for a film two years later. The title is a reference to the hit 1927 song "Fifty Million Frenchmen Can't Be Wrong" by Willie Raskin, Billy Rose, and Fred Fisher, which compared free attitudes in 1920s Paris with censorship and prohibition in the United States. The musical's plot is consistent with the standard boy-meets-girl plots of musical comedies of the first half of the twentieth century.

== History ==
Fifty Million Frenchmen was the first of seven Porter musicals to have the book written or co-written by Herbert Fields. This was also the first musical directed by Monty Woolley.

== Synopsis ==
Peter Forbes, a young American millionaire, journeys to Paris and bets his friends Billy Baxter and Michael Cummins that he can live without his money for a month and, while doing so, get engaged to Looloo Caroll, a young woman he adores. She is in Paris with her parents and her best friend Joyce. The catch is that Peter has one month, until July 4, to throw their engagement party at the Chateau Madrid. Trying to woo Looloo while penniless, he endures humiliation. His first job is as a tour guide, but much to his dismay, he has caught the eye of Violet Hildegarde, a fur-buyer who sends risqué French postcards to her children ("Where Would You Get Your Coat?"). An aspiring singer, May DeVere, also becomes interested in Peter. Since Peter has no time, Looloo and Billy have begun flirting.

Everyone goes to the racetrack, where Louis Pernasse tells Peter that the race is fixed and Toujours Moi will win, and he takes Peter's and May's money to place a bet. It appears that the horse has lost and Peter tears up his ticket, but the winner is disqualified and he has won. However, Looloo thinks he is being selfish in not sharing his winnings (since she had lent him some money) and leaves him ("You Don't Know Paree").

In another week, Pernasse is preparing a party for Looloo's mother, who plans to match her with a poor but titled Grand Duke ("The Queen of Terre Haute"). Mr. Carroll, distressed at the cost, gets drunk, and Looloo does not attend, as she has no desire to marry the Grand Duke.

On July 4, Peter is a dance-host at the Chateau Madrid. As all arrive, Billy and Michael are still chasing Violet and Joyce. Peter, with the pressure of the time-limit bet, proposes. Just then Pernasse tells him to dance with a customer and Looloo starts to leave, confused and embarrassed. Peter and Pernasse have words about the torn-up ticket and Looloo realizes that he was telling the truth. She trusts him and they become engaged as midnight arrives.

== Songs ==
Act 1

- "A Toast to Volstead" – California Collegians and Men's Ensemble
- "You Do Something to Me" – Peter Forbes and Looloo Carroll
- "The American Express" – Ensemble
- "You've Got That Thing" – Michael Cummins and Joyce Wheeler
- "Find Me a Primitive Man" – May De Vere, Boule de Neige, Oscar and Ensemble
- "Where Would You Get Your Coat?" – Violet Hildegarde
- "Do You Want to See Paris?" – Peter Forbes, California Collegians and Tourists
- "At Longchamps Today" – Ensemble
- "Yankee Doodle" – Ensemble
- "The (Happy) Heaven of Harlem" – Boule de Neige, Oscar and Chorus
- "Why Shouldn't I Have You?" – Joyce Wheeler, Michael Cummins and Chorus

Act 2

- "Somebody's Going to Throw a Big Party" – Ensemble
- "It Isn't Done" – Ensemble
- "I'm In Love" – Looloo Carroll, Ensemble and Ceballos' Hollywood Dancers
- "The Tale of the Oyster" – Violet Hildegarde
- "Paree, What Did You Do to Me?" – Joyce Wheeler and Michael Cummins
- "You Don't Know Paree" – Peter Forbes
- "I'm Unlucky at Gambling" – May De Vere and Ceballos' Hollywood Dancers

== Productions ==
Fifty Million Frenchmen premiered on Broadway at the Lyric Theatre on November 27, 1929 and closed on July 5, 1930 after 254 performances. The opening was a month after the Stock Market Crash of 1929. Directed by Monty Woolley with choreography by Larry Ceballos and scenic design by Norman Bel Geddes, the cast featured William Gaxton as Peter Forbes, Genevieve Tobin as Looloo Carroll, Betty Compton as Joyce Wheeler, and Lester Crawford as Billy Baxter.

Medicine Show Theatre Ensemble staged an Off-Off Broadway production Feb. 3-20, 1983. The theatre's artistic director Barbara Vann directed. Later to be a famed composer in his own right, Michael-John Lachiusa was the musical director.

A concert version was staged in 1991 with the book adapted by Tommy Krasker and produced by the French Institute/Alliance Francaise in association with Evans Haile at the Mainstage 14th Street Y in New York City. A studio cast recording was made with the cast members of this concert.

In 2002 the Discovering Lost Musicals Charitable Trust presented a concert at The Royal Opera House's Linbury Studio Theatre in London.

The 42nd Street Moon concert in San Francisco was presented in December 2003.

The APPLAUSE! Musicals Society concert was held February 13–16, 2008 at the Shadbolt Centre for the Arts in Burnaby, British Columbia, directed by Scott Ashton Swan.

Medicine Show Theatre, 549 W. 52nd St. in New York, revived its 1983 production of Fifty Million Frenchmen, again directed by Obie-winner Barbara Vann, Oct. 24-Nov. 18, 2012. Bob Goldstone, pianist for the Broadway production of Evita, was musical director. CurtainUp reviewer Elizabeth Ahlfors called the production, "Pure silliness... Non-stop frivolity." Will Friedwald of The Wall Street Journal called it a "spirited production of that Cole Porter gem."

In January 2013, Medicine Show Theatre did seven additional performances of its Oct.-Nov. 2012 production of Fifty Million Frenchmen, with the same cast and crew.

== Critical response ==
Stephen Citron, in his book Noel & Cole, wrote that the musical received mixed reviews, citing critics Brooks Atkinson and Richard Watts who both deemed it "pleasant", saying there was not an "outstanding hit song in the show." Gilbert Gabriel, on the other hand, said it was "the best thing in seven years!" Porter champion Irving Berlin took out an advertisement stating in part: "The best musical comedy I have seen in years..." The show had what was, for the time, a long run.

According to Charles Schwartz, writing in the biography Cole Porter, the musical's book by Herbert Fields "had a lot to do with capturing the frothy Gallic essence implicit in the title..." and he also noted the "near-perfect cast" and "sure-handed direction" of Monty Woolley.

== Film adaptations ==
- Fifty Million Frenchmen, directed by Lloyd Bacon and filmed entirely in Technicolor, was released in 1931 by Warner Bros. The cast included Ole Olsen, Chic Johnson, William Gaxton, Helen Broderick, John Halliday, Claudia Dell, Lester Crawford, and Evalyn Knapp. The songs were omitted from the 1931 film.
- In 1934, a two-reeler entitled Paree, Paree was made from the musical, and this version included the songs "You Do Something to Me", "Paree, What Did You Do To Me", "Find Me a Primitive Man", and "You've Got That Thing". The film starred Bob Hope in the William Gaxton role.
