= Criss Cross (musical) =

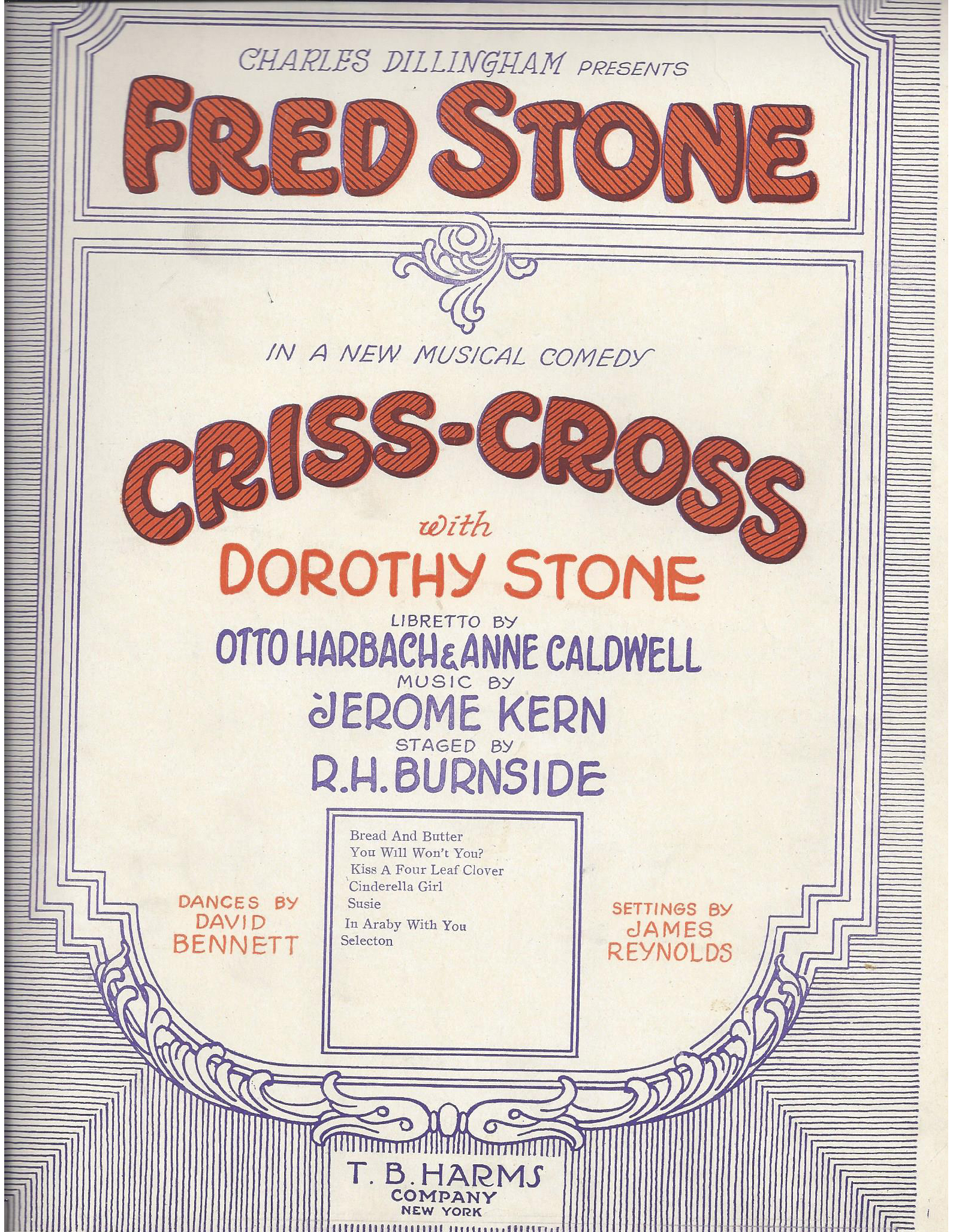
- Sheet Music Cover
- Music: Jerome Kern
- Lyrics: Otto Harbach and Anne Caldwell
- Book: Otto Harbach and Anne Caldwell

Criss Cross is a musical comedy in two acts and prologue, with book and lyrics by Otto Harbach and Anne Caldwell and music by Jerome Kern. Set in France and Algiers, the plot concerns a successful aviator, Christopher Cross (Fred Stone) who manages to help Captain Carleton save Dolly Day from the designing schemes of IIphrahim Benani to rob her of her birthright and a considerable fortune.

The show was produced by Charles Dillingham at the Globe Theatre, and opened October 12, 1926. The cast headlined Fred Stone (Christopher Cross) and Dorothy Stone (Dolly Day) and included Roy Hoyer (Captain Carleton) and Oscar Ragland (IIphrahim Benani). The musical director was Victor Baravalle and the music was orchestrated by Robert Russell Bennett and Maurice DePackh. The show was staged by R. H. Burnside and choreographed by Dave Bennett. Scenic design and costume design by James Reynolds. It ran for 210 performances, closing on April 9, 1927.

As well stated by Gerald Bordman, "From the start Criss Cross was rarely perceived as a Kern show. [Fred] Stone dominated any of his vehicles with his homey clowning and live acrobatics. ... Kern and his associates hardly ever received more than a perfunctory mention."

On October 23, 1927, Criss Cross toured to Philadelphia where it was the inaugural show at the new Erlanger Theatre.

== Songs ==
Prologue

- “Indignation Meeting”
- “Hydrophobia Blues”
- “Cinderella Girl”
- “Cinderella’s Ride”
- “She’s on Her Way”

Act 1

- “Flap-aDoodle”
- “Leaders of the Modern Regime”
- “You Will – Won’t You?”
- “In Araby With You”
- “Travelogue”

Act 2

- “Dear Algerian Land”
- “Dreaming of Allah”
- “The Dancers of the Café Kaboul”
- “The Rose of Delight”
- “The Golden Sprite”
- “Dance of the Camel Boys”
- “I Love My Little Susie”
- “The Ali Baba Babies”
- “The Four Leaf Clovers”
- “Portrait Parade”
