= Fred Stone =

American actor (1873–1959)

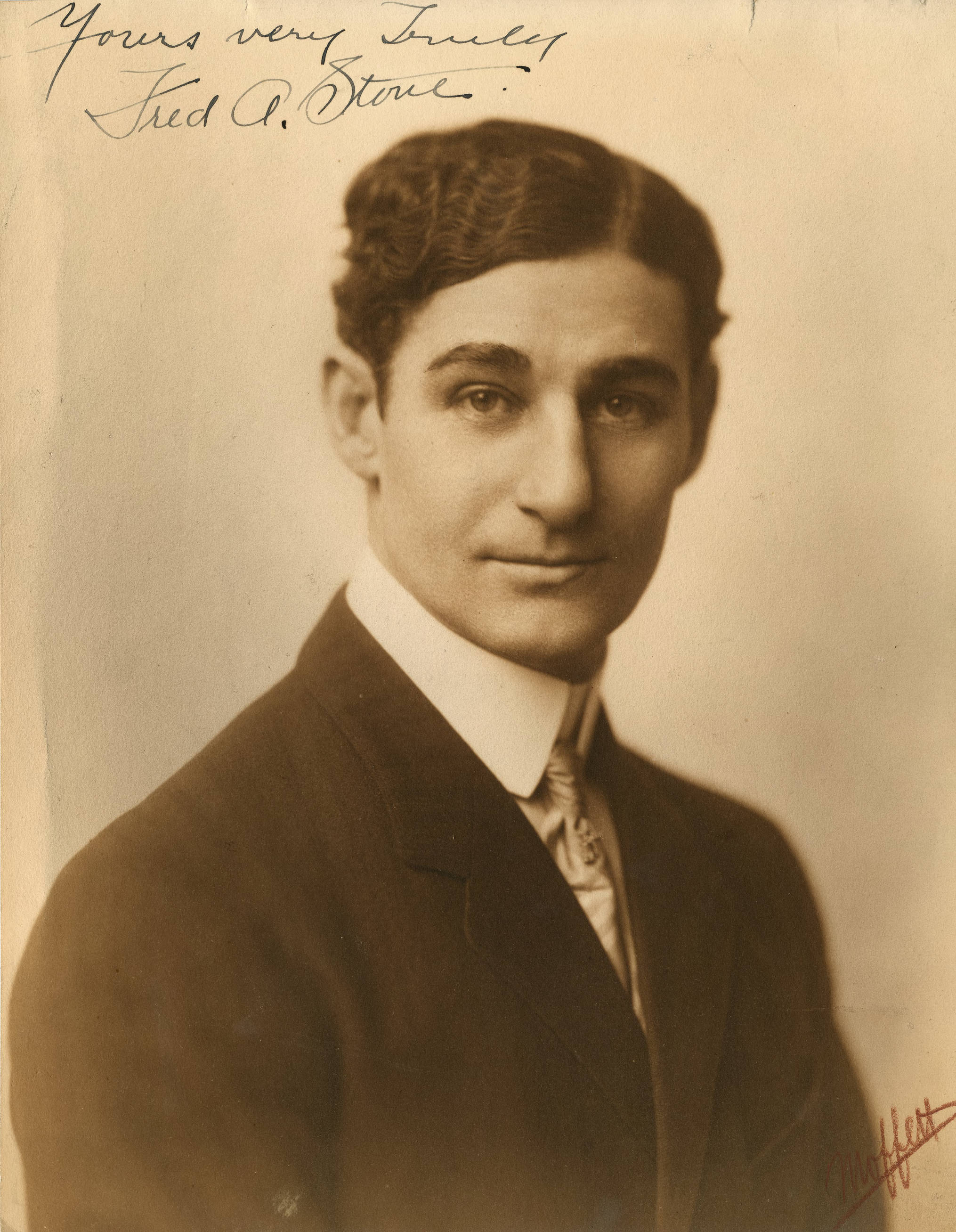
- Stone in 1911
- Born: Fred Andrew Stone; August 19, 1873; Valmont, Colorado, U.S.
- Died: March 6, 1959 (aged 85); North Hollywood, California, U.S.
- Burial place: Forest Lawn Memorial Park (Hollywood Hills)
- Occupations: Stage, film actor
- Years active: 1901–1945
- Spouse: Allene Crater (m. 1904; died 1957)
- Children: Dorothy Stone; Paula Stone; Carol Montgomery Stone
- Relatives: Milburn Stone (nephew); Madge Blake (niece)

Fred Andrew Stone (August 19, 1873 – March 6, 1959) was an American actor. Stone began his career as a performer in circuses and minstrel shows, went on to act in vaudeville, and became a star on Broadway and in feature films, which earned him a star on the Hollywood Walk of Fame.

== Biography ==
Stone was born in Valmont, Colorado, on August 19, 1873. In his early years his family moved frequently. By 1875 the family had moved to Longmont, CO, where his brother Joseph was born. The family then moved through a series of Kansas towns including Garden City (1876), Dodge City (1877), Burrton, Halstead (1878), and Wellington (1881).

He was particularly famous for appearing on stage opposite David C. Montgomery. They had a 22-year partnership until Montgomery's death in 1917. They performed in shows such as The Wizard of Oz premiering in 1902, the Victor Herbert operetta The Red Mill in 1906, and Chin-Chin, a Modern Aladdin, in 1914. In 1939, he appeared in a radio program promoting the new MGM film The Wizard of Oz, in which he got to meet the actor who played the Scarecrow, Ray Bolger, who was a great admirer of Stone's work, and although Bolger was too young to have seen Stone play the Scarecrow in the stage play, he did see Stone in The Red Mill.

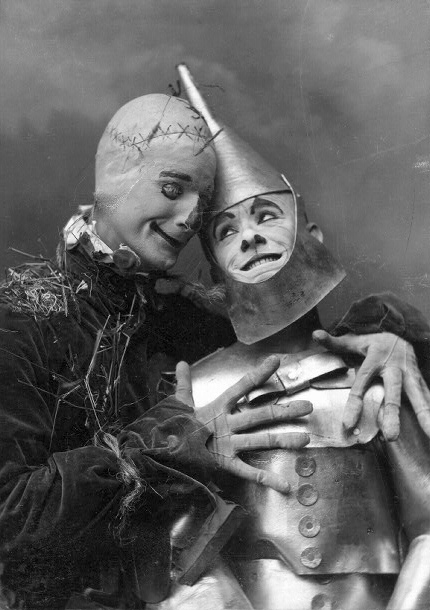
Fred Stone as the Scarecrow (left) and David C. Montgomery as the Tin Woodman in the 1902 stage extravaganza The Wizard of Oz

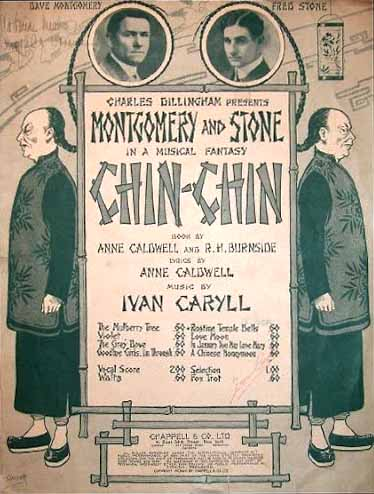
Poster art for Broadway show Chin-Chin (1914)

In 1917, he appeared on Broadway in Jack O'Lantern, which, according to Vanity Fair theater critic P.G. Wodehouse "should be the greatest success he has ever had. Fred Stone is unique. In a profession where the man who can dance can't sing and the man who can sing can't act he stands alone as one who can do everything."

Johnny Gruelle, the creator of Raggedy Ann, was a fan of Fred Stone and L. Frank Baum. Gruelle wrote a scenario for a stage show, which never was produced, in which the Scarecrow of Oz, played by Fred Stone, met Raggedy Ann. In 1923, Fred Stone and his daughter, Dorothy Stone, starred as Raggedy Andy and Raggedy Ann, respectively, in a musical extravaganza titled Stepping Stones with music by Jerome Kern and lyrics by Anne Caldwell.

Stone's feature film career began in comedy westerns; his first, The Goat, was filmed in 1918. He starred in 19 feature films. In the 1935 film Alice Adams, as Mr. Adams, he was the third lead, following Katharine Hepburn and Fred MacMurray. He made his home in Bayside, New York, where he was a neighbor and friend of boxing champion-turned-actor James J. Corbett. Around 1917, Stone built a small estate in the exclusive private community of Forest Hills Gardens. The excess grounds were sold as building lots for two other homes. However, the original mansion still stands. In it are symbols of his acting career, including a theater in the basement and a separate room of store costumes.

In 1926, after the death of his good friend Annie Oakley, he was given her unfinished autobiography.

Stone and his wife, Allene Crater, whom he met in the company of The Wizard of Oz, had three daughters, Dorothy, Paula, and Carol. Crater also appeared, in a small part, with Stone in Jack O'Lantern. A Vanity Fair review of the play said of Crater: "My only complaint is that the structure of the entertainment makes it impossible for Allene Crater, who in the little bit she does shows herself one of the most refreshing comediennes on the musical stage, to have a really good part." As an adult, Dorothy became her father's stage partner.

In 1928, Stone was critically injured in an airplane crash attempting a stunt. In addition to many other broken bones, his legs were crushed and he was told he never would dance again. His good friend Will Rogers filled in for Fred in Three Cheers, a stage show written for Fred and his daughter, Dorothy. Rogers was a hit, and Stone worked at therapy relentlessly until he proved his doctors wrong and returned to the stage in Ripples (1930).

Stone received an honorary degree from Rollins College, a small liberal-arts college located in Winter Park, Florida, in 1939. At that time, a small theatre was named in his honor. The original Fred Stone Theatre—a smaller flexible space sitting adjacent to the college's larger principal venue, the Annie Russell Theatre, named after another great American actor and benefactor—was a wooden bungalow that was razed in the early 1970s. A nearby wood and brick-faced Greek revival-styled hall, converted into a 90-seat black-box performance space, was rededicated as the Fred Stone Theatre during this period, and although it has been moved to another location on campus, it still stands and is active as a performance venue for smaller experimental productions, as well as student-directed and -choreographed works. (The Rollins Archives have extensive information on the career of Stone, including numerous photographs, and is chief among private institutions in the U.S. continuing to educate young actors about the history of this great American thespian. Rollins College claims many famous theatrical alumni, including Anthony "Tony" Perkins, best known for his role as Norman Bates in Alfred Hitchcock's Psycho, and character actress Dana Ivey.)

Fred Stone became ill and blind and was hospitalized on August 25, 1957, the year his wife died. He died on March 6, 1959, at his home in North Hollywood, California and is buried at Forest Lawn Memorial Park (Hollywood Hills).

== Legacy ==
George Ade wrote Fred Stone Jingles for Good Little Girls and Good Little Boys (20 pages, 8 poems, 10 interior photos by Charles Dillingham, George A Powers Printing Co., 1921). Stone's autobiography Rolling Stone was published in 1945 (McGraw-Hill Book Company, Inc.). P. G. Wodehouse mentions him in the short story "The Aunt and the Sluggard", a Jeeves and Bertie Wooster story.

== Broadway shows ==
- The Girl from Up There (1901)
- The Wizard of Oz (1903)
- The Red Mill (1906)
- The Old Town (1910)
- The Lady of the Slipper (1912)
- Chin-Chin (1914)
- Jack O'Lantern (1917)
- Tip Top (1920)
- Stepping Stones (1923)
- Criss Cross (1926)
- Three Cheers (1928)
- Ripples (1930)
- Smiling Faces (1932)
- Jayhawker (1934)
- You Can't Take It With You (1936 and 1945)
- Lightnin' (1938)

== Filmography ==
Year	Title	Role	Notes
1915	Destiny	Parishioner	
1918	The Goat	Chuck McCarthy	
1919	Under the Top	Jimmie Jones	
1919	Johnny Get Your Gun	Johnny Wiggins	
1921	The Duke of Chimney Butte	Jeremeah Lambert	
1922	Billy Jim	Billy Jim	
1924	Broadway After Dark	Himself	cameo appearance
1935	Alice Adams	Virgil Adams	
1936	The Trail of the Lonesome Pine	Judd Tolliver	
1936	The Farmer in the Dell	Ernest 'Pa' Boyer	
1936	Grand Jury	Commodore George Taylor	
1936	My American Wife	Lafe Cantillon	
1937	Hideaway	Frankie Peterson	
1937	Life Begins in College	Coach Tim O'Hara	
1937	Quick Money	Mayor Jonas Tompkins	
1939	Konga, the Wild Stallion	Yance Calhoun	
1939	No Place to Go	Andrew Plummer	
1940	The Westerner	Caliphet Mathews	
