= Jot Em Down, Texas =

- Unincorporated community
- Location within the state of Texas Jot Em Down (the United States)
- Coordinates: 33°22′58″N 95°51′30″W
- Country: United States
- State: Texas
- County: Delta
- Elevation: 535 ft (163 m)
- Time zone: UTC-6 (Central (CST))
  - Summer (DST): UTC-6 (CDT)
- Area codes: 903, 430
- GNIS feature ID: 2034639

Jot Em Down is a small unincorporated community in Delta County, Texas, United States. According to the Handbook of Texas, the community had a population of 10 in 2000.

== History ==
By 1885, the area was populated and included in the James H. Larabee survey. Bagley was depicted as an unidentified community with one business and sporadic homes at a location on dirt roads between the Jernigan Creek forks on the county highway map from 1936. The Jot 'Em Down Gin Corporation, named for Lum and Abner's imaginary radio store, was established immediately after Dion McDonald constructed a new store in that same year. Jot 'Em Down was later adopted as the village name on maps by the state highway department. Jot 'Em Down had six farms on a map from 1964. The 1984 county highway map still featured the village, but it did not list any businesses. In 1990 and 2000, Jot 'Em Down reported ten people living there. The community also went by the names Mohegan and Muddig Prairie.

Today, "Jot 'Em Down" has been noted for its unusual place name.

== Geography ==
Jot Em Down is located at the intersection of Farm to Market Roads 904 and 1532, 9 mi (14 km) west of Cooper and 4 mi (6.4 km) south of Pecan Gap in extreme western Delta County.

== Education ==
In 1885, the Bagley School first opened. The school had one instructor and 46 kids enrolled in 1905. 1949 saw the consolidation of the Pecan Gap district and the Bagley school. Local kids were enrolled in the Fannindel Independent School District in neighboring Fannin County by 1970.

== See also ==
- Lum 'n' Abner Jot 'Em Down Store and Museum
- Mulberry, Surry County, North Carolina
- Pine Ridge, Arkansas
- Pine Ridge, Oklahoma
