= Two Weeks to Live =

1943 film

- Directed by: Malcolm St. Clair; Charles Kerr (assistant)
- Written by: Roswell Rogers (writer); Michael L. Simmons (writer)
- Produced by: Ben Hersh (producer); Jack William Votion (executive producer)
- Starring: See below
- Cinematography: Jack MacKenzie
- Edited by: W. Duncan Mansfield
- Music by: Lucien Moraweck
- Distributed by: RKO Pictures
- Release date: February 26, 1943
- Running time: 76 minutes
- Country: United States
- Language: English

Two Weeks to Live is a 1943 American Lum and Abner film directed by Malcolm St. Clair.

== Plot ==
The full film

Abner Peabody, proud owner of the Jot 'Em Down general store in Pine Ridge, Arkansas, inherits railroad stock from his Uncle Ernest. Because of this, he becomes the sole owner of the C&O Railroad. He assumes that it is the Chicago and Ohio Railroad. His general store partner, Lum Edwards, quickly involves himself in the business by appointing himself president. Lum comes up with the idea of selling some of the stock to the town's inhabitants, thus getting money to buy the land on which the railway is built and its surroundings.

Abner agrees with the plan, and they raise nearly $10,000 from selling stock. The money is enough to buy the land and to go to Chicago, where Uncle Ernest's attorney, J.J. Stark, keeps his office. Upon their arrival they find that it is a broken-down local railroad that coincidentally is abbreviated C&O. The assets are worth no more than $200, and the rail and cars are hopelessly worn down. They send a telegram to Pine Ridge saying not to buy the land, but it arrives too late. The land has already been purchased.

Having invested every last penny in the business, the two partners leave the attorney's office in despair. On top of this, Abner trips in the stairs down from the office and falls hard to the ground. The building manager insists he should see a doctor. After a case of mistaken identities at the doctor's office, Abner receives notice that he is dying and only has two weeks left to live.

Back in the hotel when they are in their room, a window-washer named Gimpel walks in through the window with his imaginary dog. The man suggests Abner starts taking high-risk jobs to make money. Since he will die soon anyway, he has nothing to lose.

The first job that appears is as tester of a new drug that a scientist has concocted. The drug is supposed to have a personality-changing effect. The next is as a death-defying gorilla dancer. Then he is offered $1,000 to sleep one night in a supposedly haunted house, which he refuses, being too afraid of the dark. He performs a dangerous daredevil stunt, climbing from one airplane to another while they are up in the air. However, it turns out the man who hired Abner for the stunt disappears with the $5,000 payment, and they have to start all over again.

Gimpel comes with another suggestion, that they should sue the building for not having kept the stairs safe enough. They decide to do so and appoint Lum as Abner's legal representative. He does not perform very well, since he mistakes the building manager's settlement offer as $10 instead of $10,000, and in the end only manages to settle for a reimbursement sum of $65.

Soon a representative of the stock buyers, Elmer Keaton, come to the hotel to demand their money back, since they have found out the stock is practically worthless. Lum convinces Abner to spend the night at the haunted house to make some money. Both men are unaware that the woman, Mrs. Carmen, who offered Abner the job, plans to blow the house up, and claim that the dead and scorched body found in the ruins is her husband, so she can get the money from his life insurance policy.

Mrs. Carmen gives Abner a violin case and a good luck charm before sending off to the haunted house. Abner has no idea that the case contains the bomb and that the charm has the woman's husband's name on it, so that the coroner can identify the body to her advantage.

Abner manages to go to the wrong house, and the one he enters is coincidentally inhabited by Nazi spies. When Abner sees the spies he throws the case and flees. The bomb explodes and disintegrates the house, and all the spies with it.

When the two weeks have all but passed, Abner gets the offer to make $10,000 to ride a rocket to Mars. Still thinking he will soon die, Abner accepts, but changes his mind, since he will not live long enough to complete the job. He goes back to his hotel room to wait for his death, and Lum joins him.

Lum has caught a very bad cold, and the hotel staff send for a doctor, who arrives to their room a while later. The doctor determines Abner to be perfectly healthy, but also that Lum is dying. Lum decides to take the job as a rocket passenger instead of Abner. Before the two men make it to the launch pad, Gimpel answers the phone in their room and receives news that Stark has sold their land for $20,000. Stark starts for the launch pad while Lum seats himself in the rocket. When Abner hears the good news, he has to sit down, and does so on the launch button, sending Lum off into space. The rocket malfunctions and crashes back down to Earth, landing in Mars, Iowa.

== Cast ==
- Chester Lauck as Lum Edwards
- Norris Goff as Abner Peabody
- Franklin Pangborn as Mr. Pinkney
- Kay Linaker as Mrs. Madge Carmen
- Irving Bacon as Omar Tennyson Gimpel
- Herbert Rawlinson as J.J. Stark Sr.
- Ivan F. Simpson as Professor Albert Frisby
- Rosemary La Planche as Miss LaPlanche, Dr. O'Brien's Nurse
- Dorothy Ann Seese as Dorothy (uncredited)

== Retrospective appraisal ==
Describing Two Weeks to Live as “delightful”, film historian Ruth Anne Dwyer is reminded of the St. Clair and Buster Keaton collaboration on the silent films The Goat (1921) and The Blacksmith (1922).

The comic possibilities of “problem-solving by immoderate means”' is revisited in Two Weeks to Live with Abner’s repeated efforts to solve Lum’s financial troubles. The extremes to which he goes is fundamental to generating humor. Keaton remarked on the formula used in the climax to The Goat: “[W]e had the characters in serious trouble which permitted bigger laughs, and the biggest of all coming when the catastrophe threatened…Often the plot was based on a melodramatic situation.”

Dwyer adds that director St. Clair’s “Lum and Abner” comedies earned him an assignment by 20th Century Fox direct Laurel and Hardy in their final pictures.
