= Alexander-Julian Gibbson =

Nigerian-American fashion stylist

- Born: Houston
- Education: Howard University
- Occupation: Fashion stylist Photographer
- Years active: 2010
- Notable work: Lenge Lenge Video
- Website: alexanderjulian.info

Alexander-Julian Gibbson is a Nigerian-American stylist, content creator and a freelance style, travel and culture editor. He is also a visual artist widely known for his works with GQ Magazine, Vogue Magazine and his styling work for Nigerian musician, Patoranking.

== Early life ==
Gibbson was raised in Houston, Texas by his Nigerian parents from Onitsha and Asaba, both cities in Nigeria respectively. He attended the Hightower High school in Texas and later obtained a Bachelor of Arts in journalism from Howard University, a private, federally chartered historically black university (HBCU) in Washington, D.C.

== Career ==
Gibbson's career in the fashion industry began in 2010 as a stylist and he went on to work with global brands including Coca-Cola, XXL, Atlantic Records, Vogue, GQ, and FENDI America as a content and creative consultant for their campaigns and advertisements.

At age 22, Gibbson became an Editor at GQ, a role he held for 3 years at the Condé Nast publication until his exit in 2018. GQ, FLAUNT, elektro, XXL, Essence and V magazines also employed his services as stylist for several editorials.

In 2019, Essence fashion director, Marielle Bobo reached out to him to help source African designers for their summer issue featuring Ciara, Iman and Teyana Taylor, a role he referred to as an "honor".

As a travel and style editor he has written and curated content extensively for Vice, i-D magazine, Highsnobiety, Vogue Italia, Travel Noire, Coveteur and Travel and Leisure on authentic fashion amongst African and other cultures.

His groundbreaking article for i-D explored Tahiti culture before British and French Influence and the role costumes played in Polynesian culture and dance. The article also highlighted fashion designers who were carrying the island's culture to the next generation.

=== "Lenge Lenge" video ===
Gibbson was in charge of the styling for Patoranking's "Lenge Lenge" video off his Wilmer album in 2019. His styling work paid homage to afrobeat creator and activist Fela Kuti and his 27 wives, known as the Kalakuta Queens. The video was directed by Luke Biggins and Rebekah Bird. OkayAfrica in an article said that in the video "Patoranking epitomized Fela in style and jest as beautiful black women, donning face paint inspired by the Queens, surrounded him and posed in fresh threads by designers from Africa and the diaspora. The minimal vibe of the video has the eyes focus solely on the fabulous looks."

=== World Wearable Arts Awards ===
He is credited with the styling and art direction some of the pieces for the World Wearable Arts Awards in 2018. The event which started in 1987 is annual contest that showcases spectacular designs by creatives from around the world.

== Personal life ==
Alexander is currently based in New York City and travels the world to document style, culture and travel stories.
