= Mansfield Memorial Museum =

Museum

Coordinates: 40°45′32″N 82°31′01″W

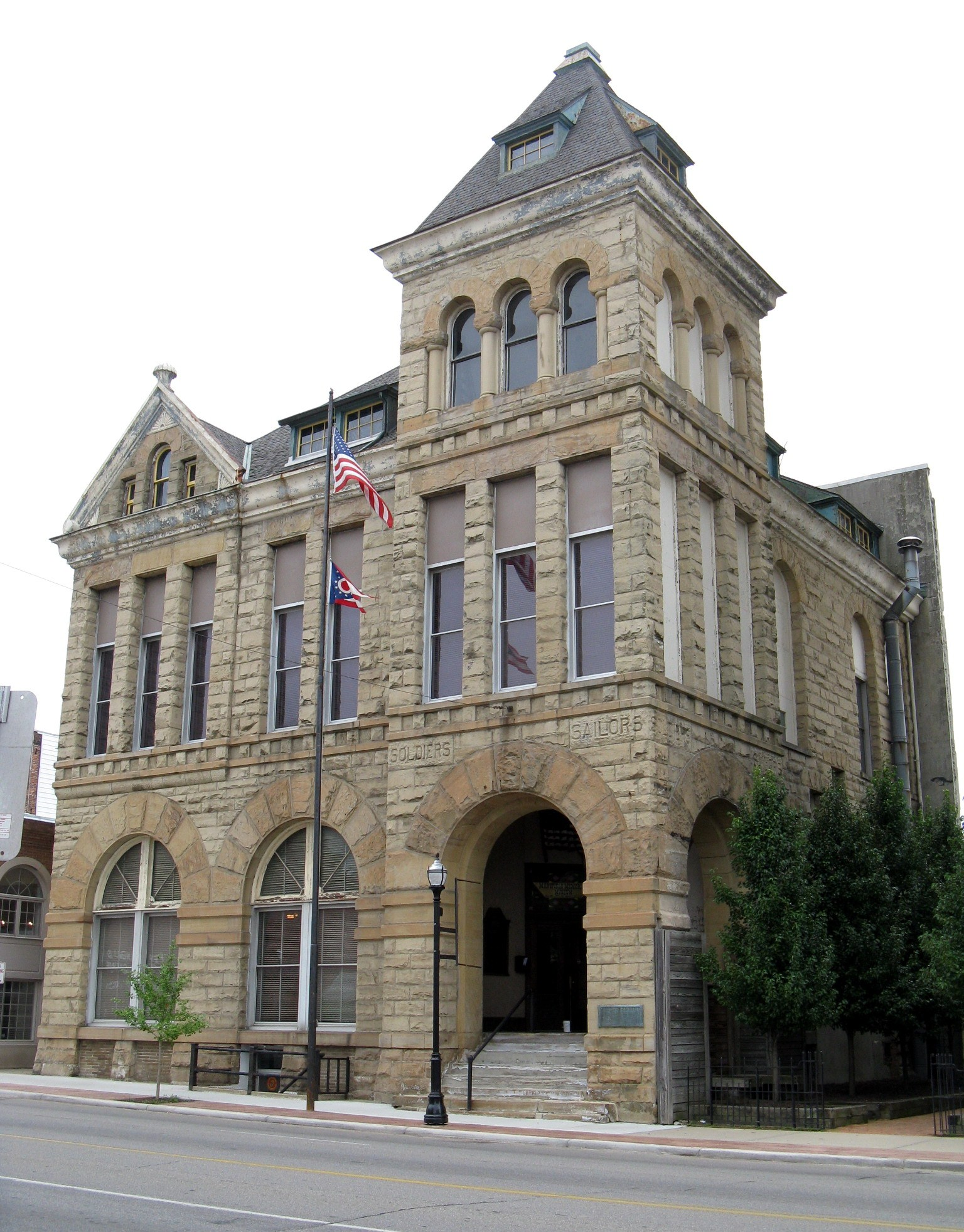
- Soldiers & Sailors Memorial Building, founded in 1889 houses the Mansfield Memorial Museum
- Former name: Soldiers and Sailors Memorial Hall
- Established: 1887
- Location: Mansfield, Ohio

The Mansfield Memorial Museum, originally Soldiers and Sailors Memorial Hall, is in downtown Mansfield, Ohio. It was founded in 1887 and opened to the public in 1889 as the Soldiers and Sailors Memorial Hall. The museum's collections include various exhibits including Native American artifacts, American Civil War memorabilia, and collections from Asia and Africa. The museum originally housed a library and theater. Oscar Cobb of Chicago designed the building. The building was built by noted architect F.F. Schnitzer, and is listed on the National Register of Historic Places.

The Grand Army of the Republic has space upstairs in the building.

Elektro, an early robot originally featured at the Westinghouse pavilion at the 1939 New York Worlds' Fair, is part of the museum's collection.

== See also ==
- Soldiers' Memorial Library
