= NAB Broadcasting Hall of Fame =

Yearly honor from the National Association of Broadcasters

The NAB Broadcasting Hall of Fame is a yearly honor from the National Association of Broadcasters. One inductee from radio and one from television are named at the yearly NAB conference.

== Radio ==
For a list of award winners, see footnote

- 1977: Jack Benny, Fred Allen, Lowell Thomas, Edward R. Murrow, Milton Cross, David Sarnoff, Ted Husing, Edwin Armstrong, Herbert Hoover, Gene Autry, Freeman Gosden, Charles Correll, Bob Hope, Graham McNamee
- 1978: Arthur Godfrey, Jim Jordan, Marian Jordan, Walter Winchell, Guglielmo Marconi
- 1979: Paul Harvey, Orson Welles
- 1980: Bing Crosby, George Burns
- 1981: Ronald Reagan, Kate Smith
- 1982: Edgar Bergen, Don McNeill
- 1983: Chester Lauck, Norris Goff, Benny Goodman
- 1984: Red Skelton, Bob Elliot, Ray Goulding
- 1985: Casey Kasem, Fred Palmer
- 1986: Mel Allen, Earl Nightingale
- 1987: Robert Trout, Gordon McLendon, Todd Storz
- 1988: Roy Acuff, William B. Williams
- 1989: Red Barber, Nathan Safir
- 1990: Charles Osgood, Hal Jackson
- 1991: Douglas Edwards
- 1992: Larry King
- 1993: Grand Ole Opry
- 1994: Harry Caray
- 1995: Gary Owens
- 1996: Don Imus
- 1997: Wally Phillips
- 1998: Rush Limbaugh
- 1999: Wolfman Jack
- 2000: Tom Joyner
- 2001: Bruce Morrow
- 2002: Dick Orkin
- 2003: Scott Shannon
- 2004: Mormon Tabernacle Choir, Music and the Spoken Word
- 2005: Jack Buck
- 2006: Dick Purtan
- 2007: Rick Dees
- 2008: Larry Lujack
- 2009: Vin Scully
- 2010: Ron Chapman
- 2011: Gerry House
- 2012: Bob Uecker
- 2013: Dave Ramsey
- 2014: Steve Harvey
- 2015: Kevin and Bean
- 2016: Mike & Mike (Mike Greenberg and Mike Golic)
- 2017: Delilah
- 2018: Elvis Duran
- 2019: Cathy Hughes
- 2020: John Records Landecker
- 2021: All Things Considered
- 2022: Jim Bohannon
- 2023: Adrian "Stretch Armstrong" Bartos and Bobbito Garcia
- 2024: Donnie Simpson

== Television ==
For list of award winners, see footnote

- 1977: William S. Paley
- 1988: Lucille Ball and Milton Berle
- 1989: Sid Caesar and Ernie Kovacs
- 1990: The Honeymooners, Sylvester L. Weaver
- 1991: Jerry Lewis
- 1992: Star Trek
- 1993: 60 Minutes
- 1994: Roone Arledge
- 1995: Carol Burnett
- 1996: M*A*S*H
- 1997: The Today Show
- 1998: Bob Keeshan
- 1999: All in the Family
- 2000: Saturday Night Live
- 2001: Ted Koppel
- 2002: Rowan and Martin's Laugh-In
- 2003: The Wonderful World of Disney
- 2004: Roger King
- 2005: The Tonight Show with Jay Leno
- 2006: Regis Philbin
- 2007: Meet the Press
- 2008: Bob Barker
- 2009: Bob Newhart
- 2010: NBC Sports
- 2011: Carsey Werner Company
- 2012: Garry Marshall, Betty White
- 2013: American Idol
- 2014: Everybody Loves Raymond
- 2015: Shonda Rhimes
- 2016: Chuck Lorre
- 2017: María Elena Salinas
- 2018: Wheel of Fortune and Jeopardy!
- 2019: Fox NFL Sunday
- 2020: America's Funniest Home Videos
- 2021: Lester Holt
- 2022: The Price Is Right
- 2023: ABC's Wide World of Sports
- 2024: America's Most Wanted

== See also ==
- Television Hall of Fame
- National Radio Hall of Fame
- National Sports Media Association Hall of Fame (including sportscasters)
