= Partners in Time (film) =

1946 film by William Nigh

- Theatrical release poster
- Directed by: William Nigh
- Screenplay by: Charles E. Roberts
- Produced by: Ben Hersh
- Starring: Chester Lauck; Norris Goff; Pamela Blake; John James; Teala Loring; Danny Duncan
- Cinematography: Jack MacKenzie
- Edited by: S. Roy Luby
- Music by: John Leipold; Lucien Moraweck
- Production company: Jack Votion Productions Inc.
- Distributed by: RKO Pictures; Monarch Film Corporation (UK)
- Release date: April 25, 1946
- Running time: 74 minutes
- Country: United States
- Language: English

Partners in Time is a 1946 American comedy film directed by William Nigh and written by Charles E. Roberts. Based on the radio comedy program Lum and Abner, the film stars Chester Lauck, Norris Goff, Pamela Blake, John James, Teala Loring and Danny Duncan. It was released on April 25, 1946, by RKO Pictures.

== Cast ==
- Chester Lauck as Lum Edwards
- Norris Goff as Abner Peabody
- Pamela Blake as Elizabeth Meadows
- John James as Tim Matthews
- Teala Loring as Janet Smith
- Danny Duncan as Grandpappy Spears / Constable Spears
- Grady Sutton as Cedric Weehunt
- Dick Elliott as Squire Skimp
- Phyllis Kennedy as Abagail
- Ruth Lee as Miss Martha Thurston
- Charles Jordan as Gerald Sharpe
- Ruth Caldwell as Josie
