= Mulberry, North Carolina =

Mulberry, North Carolina may refer to the following census-designated places:

- Mulberry, Surry County, North Carolina
- Mulberry, Wilkes County, North Carolina
