= The Bashful Bachelor =

1942 film

- Movie poster
- Directed by: Malcolm St. Clair; Charles Kerr (assistant)
- Written by: Chester Lauck (story) and Norris Goff (story); Chandler Sprague (screenplay)
- Produced by: Jack William Votion
- Cinematography: Paul Ivano
- Edited by: W. Duncan Mansfield
- Distributed by: RKO Pictures
- Release date: April 24, 1942 (U.S.)
- Running time: 78 minutes
- Country: United States
- Language: English
- Budget: $165,000 (estimated)
- Box office: $675,000 (US)

The Bashful Bachelor is a 1942 American comedy film directed by Malcolm St. Clair. It is the second of seven films based on the Lum and Abner radio series created by and starring Chester Lauck and Norris Goff.

== Plot ==
Small town store owner Lum Edwards (Chester Lauck) in Pine Ridge has a thorn in his side because his partner in the Jot-em-Down general store, Abner Peabody (Norris Goff), has exchanged the store delivery car for a race track horse. And because Lum doesn't have the guts to approach the woman he is in love with, Geraldine (ZaSu Pitts), and propose to her once and for all, he lays a complex scheme to impress her in a fake "rescue" mission. He fails tremendously in this mission, and nearly gets everyone killed in doing so. However, he doesn't give up, but tries again, and finally succeeds in impressing her. His problems continue when his proposal, to be delivered to Geraldine by his partner Abner, is instead delivered to a very prone bachelorette, Widder Abernathy (Constance Purdy). She jumps at the possibility of marrying Lum, and the game is afoot. Lum doesn't get out of trouble until the town sheriff (Irving Bacon) finds widow Widder's disappeared husband.

== Cast ==
- Chester Lauck as Lum Edwards
- Norris Goff as Abner Peabody
- ZaSu Pitts as Geraldine
- Grady Sutton as Cedric Wiehunt
- Oscar O'Shea as Squire Skimp
- Louise Currie as Marjorie
- Constance Purdy as Widder Abernathy
- Irving Bacon as Sheriff / Fire Chief
- Earle Hodgins as Joseph Abernathy
- Benny Rubin as Pitch Man
