= Dreaming Out Loud (film) =

1940 American film directed by Harold Young starring Chester Lauck

- Directed by: Harold Young
- Written by: Robert Hardy Andrews (writer); Howard J. Green (writer); Barry Trivers (story)
- Produced by: Sam Coslow; Jack William Votion (as Vocos Productions/Post Pictures Inc.)
- Starring: Chester Lauck; Norris Goff; Frances Langford
- Cinematography: Philip Tannura
- Edited by: Otto Ludwig
- Music by: Lucien Moraweck
- Distributed by: RKO Radio Pictures
- Release date: September 30, 1940
- Running time: 81 minutes
- Country: United States
- Language: English

Dreaming Out Loud is a 1940 American comedy film based on the radio series Lum and Abner, directed by Harold Young starring Chester Lauck and Norris Goff. It is also known as Money Isn't Everything.

== Plot ==
Lum Edwards and Abner Peabody are two elderly men owning the Jot 'Em Down general store, which is the center of life in Pineridge, Arkansas. They try to lend a helping hand to their unfortunate town neighbors. An alcoholic, Wes Stillman, loses his daughter Effie Lou in a traffic accident, when she is hit by a passing car. Wes is beyond himself with grief and cannot stop blaming himself for not taking better care of her. In order to bring relief to Wes, Lum and Abner see to it that Wes is appointed deputy sheriff, and in charge of putting traffic offenders to justice. Wes gets to serve as deputy directly under police Constable Caleb Weehunt.

Another neighbor in distress is up next. The store also serves as the town's post office, where Alice is working as post-mistress. Doctor Kenneth Barnes, son of Doctor Walter "Doc Walt" Barnes, cannot marry his fiancé Alice, because her aunt Jessica Spencer demands she make a better choice financially – and she has a feud with Doc Walt. Kenneth is working as a doctor in the next town; but, doesn't make enough to support a wife and their younger brother; so, they have to wait. Lum and Abner try to get the doctor a mobile medical unit which would let him support his wife and her younger brother Jimmy when he arrives from his present working place in Adamstown. But the wealthy aunt doesn't budge because she doesn't approve of Doc Walt. When Jimmy falls very ill with pneumonia, Doc Walt saves his life, using a special oxygen inhalator that he himself invented. Doc Walt dies in his efforts to save the boy. Ridden by guilt, Aunt Jessica finally coughs up the money to buy Ken a mobile medical unit, so that he can save more lives. Soon after, the person who hit Effie Lou is caught and arrested. It turns out it was Jessica's secretary Will Danielson.

== Cast ==
- Chester Lauck as Lum Edwards
- Norris Goff as Abner Peabody
- Frances Langford as Alice
- Frank Craven as Dr. Walter Barnes
- Bobs Watson as Jimmy
- Irving Bacon as Wes Stillman
- Clara Blandick as Jessica Spencer
- Robert Wilcox as Dr. Kenneth Barnes
- Donald Briggs as Will Danielson
- Robert McKenzie as Constable Caleb Weeunt
- Phil Harris as Peter Atkinson
- Sheila Sheldon as Effie Lou Stillman
- Troy Brown Jr. as Washington

== Soundtrack ==
- Frances Langford – "Dreaming out Loud" (By Sam Coslow)
