= Nathan Safir =

American radio executive (c. 1913 – 1996)

- Born: 1913 or 1914; Hartford, Connecticut or New Haven, Connecticut, US
- Died: September 7, 1996; San Antonio, Texas, US
- Occupation: Radio executive

Nathan Safir (1913 or July 14, 1914 – September 7, 1996) was an American radio executive and broadcaster who was active in the development of Spanish-language radio in the United States after the Second World War.

== Early life ==
Safir was born to Russian parents in Connecticut, but was raised in Monterrey, Mexico, and attended the University of Texas at Austin, graduating with a bachelor's degree in journalism. He did not speak English at the age of 12 and was sent to be educated at the Texas Military Institute. Safir's first job after graduation was with the Laredo Times newspaper; he then became the assistant news editor for station WOAI in San Antonio before moving to competing station KABC. He started what was said to be the city's first Spanish-language radio program at station KTSA in 1940.

== Later life ==
After serving in the infantry in World War II (during which time he hosted Spanish-language shows for Armed Forces Radio in London), Safir became a pioneer in Spanish-language broadcasting in San Antonio, helping to develop KCOR (1350 AM), an all-Spanish radio station in San Antonio started in 1946 by Raúl Cortez. Station development was slow: by 1954, there were just ten Spanish-language radio stations in the country, and people sometimes thought the station broadcast directly from Mexico. Safir would also serve three years as general manager of KCOR's television expansion, KCOR-TV (later KWEX-TV), as well as 44 years as general manager of the radio station, retiring in 1990. During his time at the station, he was said to oversee "the whole ball of wax", from programming to community involvement.

In his later career, Safir was recognized as one of the leading lights of Spanish-language radio, being elected president of the Spanish Radio Broadcasters of America and the Texas Association of Broadcasters. In 1984, Tichenor Media, which owned KCOR and other Spanish-language media properties, created a Tichenor Spanish Media Group and named Safir its president, with CEO McHenry Tichenor calling him "the premier Spanish broadcaster in the U.S." and "the dean in the field". He was inducted into the NAB Broadcasting Hall of Fame by the National Association of Broadcasters in 1989; NAB chairman Lowry Mays, founder of San Antonio-based Clear Channel Communications, noted that "he has never wavered or doubted the ultimate success of the Spanish format".

Safir died on September 7, 1996, from complications of diabetes. An obituary in the San Antonio Express-News described him as "a trailblazer in Spanish-language broadcasting in the United States".
