= Pine Ridge, Arkansas =

Unincorporated community in Arkansas, US

Pine Ridge is an unincorporated community in Oden Township, Montgomery County, Arkansas, United States. It is located at 34°35′9″N 93°54′36″W.

The original name was Waters, but the name was changed in 1936 to Pine Ridge through a vote of the city's town council. Waters was the basis for the fictional town of Pine Ridge, Arkansas on the radio show Lum and Abner, and the name of the real town was changed to honor and match the fictional one that made it famous. Since that time, Pine Ridge has lost its incorporation and no longer has a municipal government. The two oldest buildings in Pine Ridge, the Huddleston Store and McKinzie Store, both of which date to the first decade of the 20th century, are listed on the National Register of Historic Places and currently serve as a Lum and Abner museum and replica of the "Jot'em Down" general store heard in the radio series.

== See also ==
- Jot Em Down, Texas
- Jot-Um-Down, North Carolina
- Pine Ridge, Oklahoma
