= Lum and Abner =

American network radio comedy program

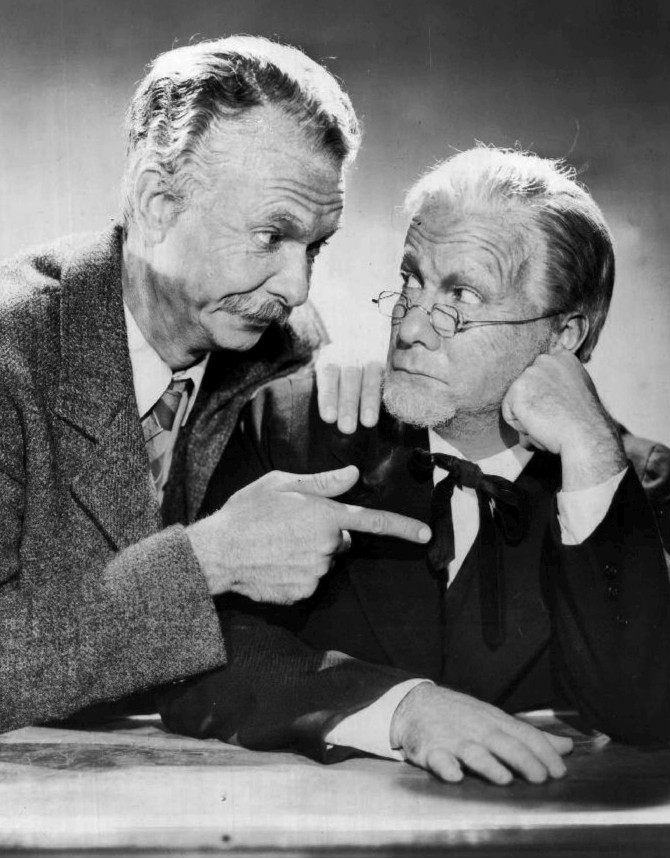
Chester Lauck and Norris Goff as Lum and Abner in 1949

Lum and Abner was an American network radio comedy program created by Chester Lauck and Norris Goff that was produced from 1931 to 1954. Modeled on life in the small town of Waters, Arkansas, near where Lauck and Goff grew up, the show proved immensely popular. In 1936, Waters changed its name to "Pine Ridge" after the show's fictional town.

== Synopsis ==
The series was created by co-stars Chester Lauck (who played Columbus "Lum" Edwards) and Norris Goff (Abner Peabody). Lum always pronounced his own name as Ed'erds and was very annoyed if Abner or anyone brought up his full first name. The two characters performed as a double act, with Lum generally playing the straight man to Abner's attempts to break free from Lum's influence. As co-owners of the Jot 'em Down Store in the fictional town of Pine Ridge, Arkansas, the pair are constantly stumbling upon moneymaking ideas only to find themselves fleeced by nemesis Squire Skimp, before finally finding a way to redeem themselves. Lum and Abner played the hillbilly theme with deceptive cleverness.

In addition to the title characters, Lauck also played Grandpappy Spears and Cedric Weehunt while Goff played Abner, Squire Skimp, Llewelyn "Mousey" Grey, Dick Huddleston, and most of the other characters.

Lum and Abner, like most sitcoms of the era, had a live house band, in this case a string band in keeping with the show's hillbilly humor. Marshall Jones, before his adoption of the "Grandpa" persona that made him famous years later, was among the band's first members.

== Show history ==
Lauck and Goff had known each other since childhood and attended the University of Arkansas together where they both joined the Sigma Chi fraternity. They performed locally and established a blackface act which led to an audition at radio station KTHS in Hot Springs, Arkansas. Prior to the audition, the two men decided to change their act and portray two hillbillies, due to the large number of blackface acts already in existence. After only a few shows in Hot Springs, they were picked up nationally by NBC, and Lum and Abner, sponsored by Quaker Oats, ran until 1932. Lauck and Goff performed several different characters, modeling many of them on the real-life residents of Waters, Arkansas.

Advertisement for Lum and Abner radio program

When the Quaker contract expired, Lauck and Goff continued to broadcast on two Texas stations, WBAP (Fort Worth) and WFAA (Dallas). In 1933, The Ford Dealers of America became their sponsor for approximately a year. Horlicks Malted Milk, the 1934–37 sponsor, offered a number of promotional items, including almanacs and fictional Pine Ridge newspapers. During this period, the show was broadcast on Chicago's WGN (AM), one of the founding members of the Mutual Broadcasting System. Effective July 1, 1935, the program was also carried on WLW (Cincinnati, Ohio), KNX (Los Angeles, California), and KFRC (San Francisco, California). Along with The Lone Ranger, Lum and Abner was one of Mutual's most popular programs. In 1936, Dick Huddleston of Waters petitioned the United States Post Office to change the town's name to Pine Ridge. Postum beverage sponsored Lum and Abner in 1938–40, before Alka-Seltzer picked up the duo. Miles Laboratories, manufacturers of Alka-Seltzer and One-A-Day Vitamins, became the longest-running sponsor, backing the program from 1941 until 1948. Over the course of its life, Lum and Abner appeared on all four major radio networks: NBC, Mutual, CBS and ABC (formerly NBC Blue).

In 1948, the show changed from a 15-minute "comedic soap opera" to a 30-minute self-contained show. New writers were added, including Flying Tiger ace Robert T. Smith, along with an orchestra and a live audience. The new format was unpopular and the series came off the air in 1950. Lauck and Goff experimented with other formats during the hiatus, finally changing back to a 15-minute, Monday-Friday show on ABC in 1953, but the revived show was discontinued the following year due to competition from television and Goff's failing health (Goff would eventually recover and continue making media appearances well into the 1960s). The duo twice made attempts to transition to television, but neither effort was picked up by a television network.

=== Episode status ===
The team broadcast more than 5,000 shows, of which over 1,630 episodes exist today. The archive is extensive between 1935 and 1948, a rarity for 15-minute shows that were typically never recorded (most of its contemporary daytime programs have fewer than 100 episodes remaining). As with most old-time radio shows, very little pre-1935 content (in this case, two episodes) survive. Only a handful of post-1948 programs and some of the 1953–54 revival have survived; most recordings of those shows are believed to have been destroyed.

=== Films ===
Like several of their contemporaries, Lauck and Goff had the opportunity to bring their characters to life in movies. The Lum & Abner radio show of March 29, 1940, "The Store Closes to Shoot a Movie," announced a break in the radio series in order to make the first film of the series, Dreaming Out Loud, which was released the same year. At a rate of roughly one per year, another five films would be produced in the series.

- Dreaming Out Loud (1940)
- The Bashful Bachelor (1942)
- Two Weeks to Live (1943)
- So This Is Washington (1943)
- Goin' to Town (1944)
- Partners in Time (1946)

Ten years after the film series ended, by which point Lum and Abner had long left radio, a seventh film was released. 1956's Lum and Abner Abroad was originally made for television, with the film divided into three episodes. Conceived as a three-part pilot for a TV series and filmed on location in Yugoslavia, it featured none of the staff from previous films or the radio series other than Lauck and Goff themselves. The series was never picked up, with the three episodes airing as a film in theaters.

- Lum and Abner Abroad (1956)

== Legacy ==
As well as inspiring the program and its characters, Pine Ridge, Arkansas is also home to the Lum and Abner Museum, which opened in the 1970s and is listed on the National Register of Historic Places. A replica of the Jot 'em Down Store stands adjacent to the Museum. Other rural locations named after the show include Jot Em Down, Texas; Jot-Um-Down, North Carolina; and Pine Ridge, Oklahoma.

== The National Lum and Abner Society ==
The National Lum and Abner Society, formed in 1984, published a bimonthly newsletter, The Jot 'Em Down Journal, until 2007. Between 1985 and 2005 the organization held 20 annual conventions (skipping 2004) in Pine Ridge and Mena, Arkansas, playing host to numerous veterans of the Lum and Abner radio programs and motion pictures. Since 2007, the NLAS has existed as an organization with free membership with its Jot 'Em Down Journal transferred to the NLAS website. Founding officers Sam Brown, Tim Hollis, and Donnie Pitchford have remained connected to the organization since the beginning.

NLAS Convention guest stars included radio–television–cinema veterans Roswell Rogers, Clarence Hartzell, Jerry Hausner, Elmore Vincent, Wendell Niles, Bobs Watson, Les Tremayne, Louise Currie, Willard Waterman, Parley Baer, Cathy Lee Crosby, Forrest Owen, Mary Lee Robb, Kay Linaker, Frank Bresee, Fred Foy, Barbar Fuller, Sam Edwards, Dick Beals, Rhoda Williams, Robie Lester, Ginny Tyler, Nancy Wible, and Dallas McKennon. Additionally, various family members and personal friends of Chester Lauck and Norris Goff were present.

The first NLAS "Reunion" took place in June 2011 as part of the annual Lum and Abner Festival in Mena, Arkansas to celebrate the 80th Anniversary of the Lum and Abner show as well as the 75th anniversary of the changing of the name of Waters, Arkansas to Pine Ridge. All 23 years of the NLAS publication The Jot 'Em Down Journal are now available free of charge (see External links below for the National Lum and Abner Society) in PDF format as well as audio for the blind (or anyone who chooses to listen).

A final NLAS Convention was held in 2015 featuring guest stars John Rose (cartoonist of Barney Google and Snuffy Smith) and Mike Curtis (writer of Dick Tracy).

Plans are underway for a series of radio programs containing the audio contents of all 1985-2025 NLAS Conventions.

== Lum and Abner comic strip ==
Early in 2011, negotiations between Ethan C. Nobles of firstarkansasnews.net, the Chester Lauck family and cartoonist Donnie Pitchford resulted in a new comic strip series based on the classic radio programs and its characters. Beginning June 5, 2011, Lum and Abner officially began appearing in a "Sunday strip" format with a new installment each Sunday. The comic strip made its newspaper debut in The Mena Star of Mena, Arkansas on Thursday, July 28, 2011. It has since been signed by The Standard of Amity, Arkansas, and the nationally distributed Today's Grocer.

Each strip is accompanied by an audio dramatization with voices, sound effects and music, a feature designed with blind fans of "old time radio" in mind, but one that any reader may access.

In April 2013, radio producer Joe Bevilacqua entered into an agreement with Donnie Pitchford to broadcast the Lum and Abner comics as part of his weekly radio show The Comedy-O-Rama Hour. The first two Lum and Abner radio comics premiered April 13, 2013.

The success of these broadcasts prompted the release of 100 All New “Lum & Abner” Comic Strips, an audiobook written and directed by Donnie Pitchford featuring a full cast. The three-hour-long audio theater is available from Waterlogg Productions and Blackstone Audio.

On Sunday, July 20, 2014, the characters of Lum and Abner were awarded a cameo appearance in the Harvey Award-winning Dick Tracy comic strip, written by Mike Curtis and illustrated by Joe Staton. Lum and Abner were introduced during the crossover in which Tracy rescues Annie, whose own comic strip ended in 2010.

In 2021, the comic strip celebrated the 90th anniversary of the first Lum and Abner radio broadcast as well as the 85th anniversary of the naming of Pine Ridge, Arkansas, along with the 10th anniversary of the strip.

== Gallery ==
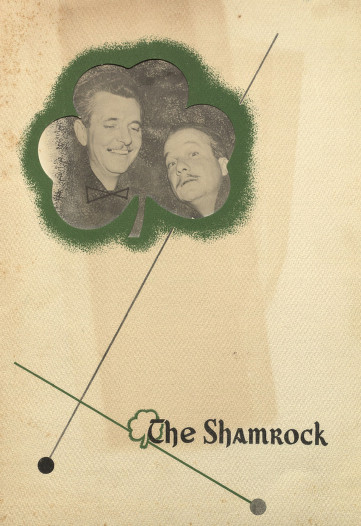
Shamrock Hotel program/menu featuring Lum and Abner – cover (c. 1950, Houston, Texas)

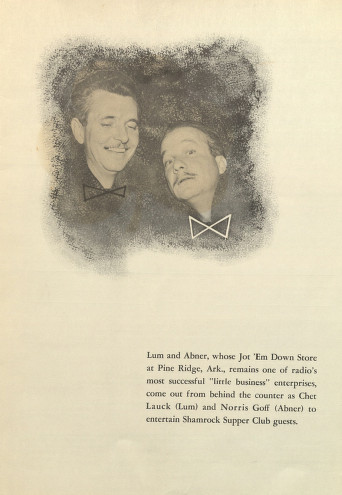
Shamrock Hotel program/menu featuring Lum and Abner – biography and photo (c. 1950, Houston, Texas)

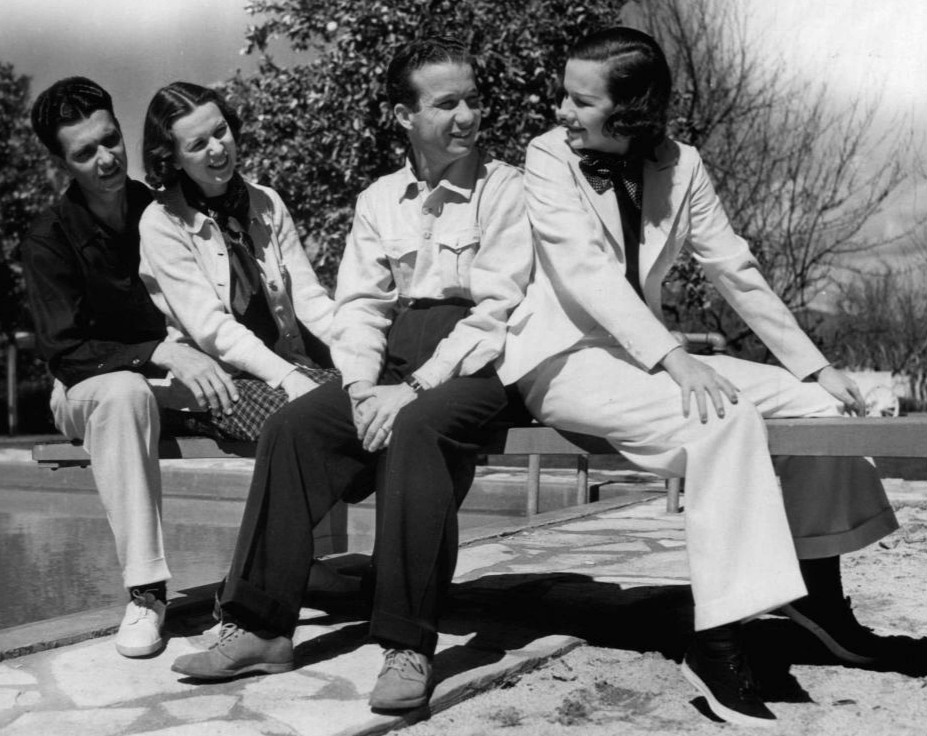
Chester and Mrs. Lauck with Norris and Mrs. Goff, 1941
