= Adora Andrews =

American actress

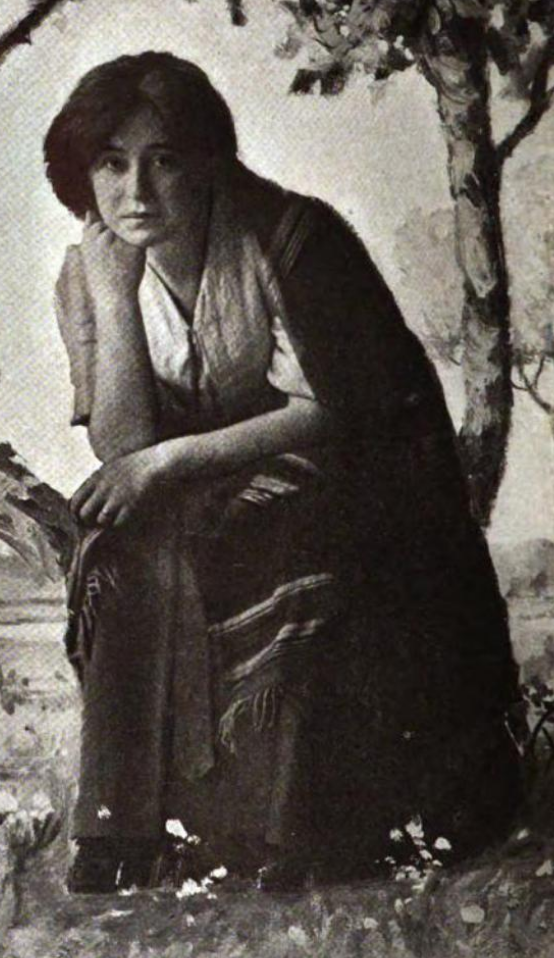
- Adora Andrews, from a 1908 publication.
- Born: March 19, 1872; Denver, Colorado
- Died: September 18, 1956 (aged 84); Rye, New York
- Occupation: Actress

Adora Andrews (March 19, 1872 – September 18, 1956) was an American actress, working mainly on stage from the 1890s to the late 1930s.

== Early life ==
Andrews was born in Denver, Colorado.

== Career ==
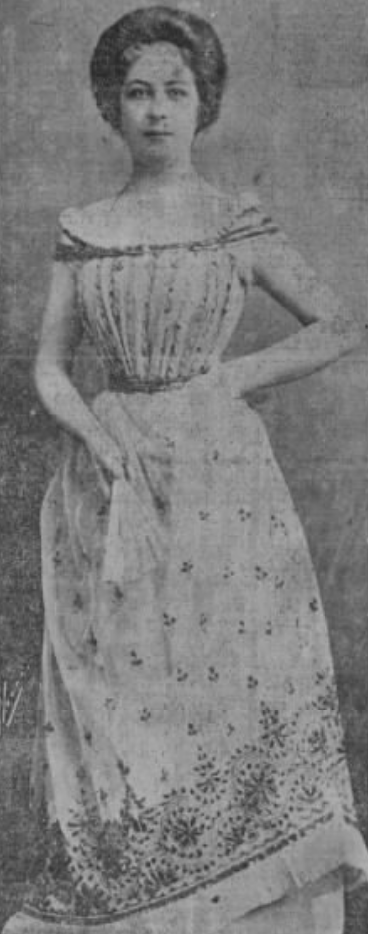
Adora Andrews wearing a beetlewing dress, 1898.

As a young woman, Andrews was noted for her gowns and hairstyles. In 1898, her photograph appeared in newspapers, because she was wearing a white silk gown decorated with "5000 beetle wings", used like beads for a decorative trim. Also in 1898, she posed for a series of illustrations for creating a hairstyle with a pompadour roll. "I can't tolerate the Paris pompadour, with its tight pug at the back," she explained. "I arrange mine lower, in the regular figure 8".

Andrews was primarily a stage actress, beginning in stock companies with Sadie Martinot and Charles Frohman. Her Broadway credits included roles in Arizona (1900-1901), Her First Divorce (1913), Roly-Boly Eyes (1919), Lollipop (1924), Money from Home (1927), The 19th Hole (1927-1928), Smiling Faces (1932), False Dreams, Farewell (1934), and Tovarich (1936-1937). She also starred in the national touring company of The Great Divide (1908), and was a principal in the summer stock company at Cook Opera House in Rochester. In 1908, she starred in The Rose of the Rancho when it opened the Grand Opera House in Winnipeg. On film, Andrews is best known for her role in The Middleton Family at the New York World's Fair (1939).

== Personal life ==
Andrews died at a nursing home in Rye, New York in 1956, aged 84 years.
