= Goin' to Town (1944 film) =

1944 film directed by Leslie Goodwins

- Theatrical poster for the film
- Directed by: Leslie Goodwins; John E. Burch (assistant)
- Written by: Charles E. Roberts; Charles R. Marion
- Produced by: Frank Melford
- Starring: Chester Lauck; Norris Goff; Florence Lake; Andrew Tombes
- Cinematography: Robert Pittack
- Edited by: Pete Fritch
- Music by: Lud Gluskin
- Production company: Jack Wm. Votion Productions
- Distributed by: RKO Radio Pictures
- Release date: September 28, 1944
- Running time: 69 minutes
- Country: United States
- Language: English

Goin' to Town is a 1944 American comedy film directed by Leslie Goodwins from an original screenplay by Charles E. Roberts and Charles R. Marion, based upon the successful radio program Lum and Abner created by Chester Lauck and Norris Goff. It was the fifth of seven films in the Lum and Abner series, and was released by RKO Radio Pictures on September 28, 1944. The film stars Lauck and Goff, along with Florence Lake and Andrew Tombes.

== Plot ==
Lum Edwards and Abner Peabody own a general store in Pine Ridge. When oil tycoon M. A. Parker is stranded in the town awaiting his car being repaired, he decides to play a practical joke on the two small-town rubes, and feigns interest in purchasing their store, alleging that there is an oil deposit below the premises. He offers Lum and Abner $20,000 for their property, but the two believe he is trying to steal their property by offering them far less than the property is truly worth. Rather than take Parker's money, the pair convince their friends and neighbors to donate money to drill for oil.

As the days go by and they do not strike oil, Lum and Abner get their fellow citizens to invest more and more funds. Eventually, however, there comes a day when their oil speculation company runs out of money. Desperate to get their investors' money back, the pair head to Chicago to sell their property to Parker. While waiting to see him, the duo is overheard discussing their oil property by Jimmy Benton, who works for Parker's chief rival. He approaches Lum and Abner and offers them a large sum of money for their property, enough to pay back all their investors. Parker's partner, Clarke, overhears Benton's offer, and not wanting to lose out on such a lucrative prospect, offers the pair even more money. Lum and Abner agree to sell to Clarke, and return to Pine Ridge, able to pay back all their investors with interest, as well as making a tidy profit for themselves. Parker and Clarke, meanwhile, are left with a worthless piece of property.

== Cast ==
(cast list as per AFI database)

- Chester Lauck as Lum Edwards
- Norris Goff as Abner Peabody
- Barbara Hale as Sally
- Florence Lake as Abigail
- Grady Sutton as Cedric
- Dick Elliott as Squire
- Herbert Rawlinson as Wentworth
- Dick Baldwin as Jimmy Benton
- Ernie Adams as Zeke
- Jack Rice as Clarke
- Sam Flint as Dr. Crane
- Andrew Tombes as M. A. Parker
- George Chandler as Jameson
- Ruth Lee as Mrs. Wentworth
- Danny Duncan as Grandpappy Spears
- Marietta Canty as Camelia

== Production ==
In July 1944, RKO announced that Goin' to Town would be one of at least 50 films on their 1944–45 production schedule, although work had already begun on the picture in April. The film was slated to be one of five RKO productions to be screened at New York City tradeshows from September 18–22.

== Reception ==
The Film Daily found little merit with the film, feeling that it would only appeal to fans of the radio program. They called the production quality "routine", and the direction of Leslie Goodwins, "pedestrian". Harrison's Reports also gave the picture a lukewarm review, echoing the sentiment that it would only find an audience among the existing fans of the Lum and Abner radio show. Motion Picture Daily was more kind. While they agreed that the film's comedy would find the best reception among the radio show's audience, they felt that it would have a broader appeal, saying that the picture made "...no passes at subtlety or finesse and concentrates on characterization and the broad sweep of rustic humor. The trade name for this is corn, but it's Grade 'A' corn...."

== See also ==
- List of American films of 1944
