= Lum and Abner Abroad =

- Theatrical release poster
- Directed by: James V. Kern
- Screenplay by: Carl Herzinger
- Story by: Carl Herzinger; James V. Kern
- Produced by: James V. Kern
- Starring: Chester Lauck; Norris Goff; Jill Alis; Lila Audres; Gene Gary; Chris Peters
- Cinematography: Krešo Grčević; Oktavijan Miletić
- Edited by: Blanche Jens; Maurice Wright
- Production company: Nasbro Pictures Inc.
- Distributed by: Nasbro Pictures Inc.
- Release date: January 1, 1956
- Running time: 72 minutes
- Country: United States
- Language: English

Lum and Abner Abroad is a 1956 European comedy film directed by James V. Kern and written by Carl Herzinger. The film stars Chester Lauck, Norris Goff, Jill Alis, Lila Audres, Gene Gary, and Chris Peters. The film was released on January 1, 1956.

== Plot ==
The film consists of three two-reel episodes. In each, Lum and Abner visit a different city in Europe.

- In Zagreb, Yugoslavia, the two involve themselves in the disappearance of an American reporter, who is engaged to a local ballerina.
- In Paris, France, a thief and his femme fatale co-conspirator plot to use Lum and Abner as pawns to smuggle a valuable figurine out of the country.
- In Monte Carlo, Monaco, Lum and Abner are mistaken for two much wealthier Americans; a deadbeat duchess sees them as an easy mark and hopes to get a cut of the duo's losses at the local casino. To her dismay, the two hit a lucky streak and end up making 100 times their wager.

== Cast ==
- Chester Lauck as Lum Edwards
- Norris Goff as Abner Peabody
- Jill Alis as Marianne Passavetz
- Lila Audres as Collette Bleu
- Gene Gary as Nikolai Brasnovich
- Chris Peters as Croupier
- Nada Nučić as Lisa Dubroc
- Branko Špoljar as Papa Passavetz
- Jim Kiley as Tommy Ellis
- Steven Voyt as Frankenshpinin
- Vera Misita as Duchess Dubroc
- Vlado Štefančić as Mischa Dramascu
- Josip Batistić as Dignitary

== Background ==
Lum and Abner Abroad was originally conceived as a television series and a comeback vehicle for the Lum and Abner characters. The duo had appeared in six feature films and a long-running radio series between 1935 and 1950, but other than a short-lived radio revival in 1953, had not appeared in media since then. Lum and Abner had made at least one previous effort to transition to television under the more familiar format of the radio show; like Lum and Abner Abroad, that effort was also unsuccessful, although the pilot episode of the other series also survives.

The six previous Lum and Abner features, produced independently in Hollywood, followed the radio format of Lum and Abner as residents of "Pine Ridge, Arkansas." Lum and Abner Abroad, however, was a European production, with filming and accommodations based in Yugoslavia. According to co-star Chester Lauck, the Yugoslavian crew was so inexperienced and the conditions so primitive that director James V. Kern had to improvise technical shortcuts, like hanging a microphone on a pole to function as a makeshift boom. Kern was credited as both producer and director; the film became Kern's last theatrical film, as he had shifted to television by the 1950s.

Had Lum and Abner Abroad been sponsored as a series, the three shorts would have constituted three half-hour episodes of the series. As the series was not picked up, they were instead hastily strung together and released as a feature film. Although the international actors spoke English and were not dubbed, the finished film lacked the usual Hollywood production polish, and no major distributor would release it. It was acquired by Howco Productions, a South Carolina-based distributor whose customers were largely based in the American South, and thus might attract Lum and Abner's rural fan base. (The film's main title reads: "Actually Filmed in Europe (Not Pine Ridge).")

== Reception ==
A retrospective review at TV Guide praised Lum and Abner's performances but criticized the poor editing (fade-outs and fade-ins for commercial breaks were left in the theatrical prints) and simplistic script, giving the film one out of five stars.
