= Mena High School =

Location
- 700 South Morrow St; Mena, Arkansas 71953; United States; 34°34′49″N 94°13′16″W

Information
- Type: Public secondary
- Established: August 1922 (104 years ago)
- School district: Mena School District
- NCES District ID: 0509750
- CEEB code: 040650
- NCES School ID: 050975000713
- Principal: Zachary Sweet
- Teaching staff: 70.74 (on FTE basis)
- Grades: 9–12
- Enrollment: 493 (2023-2024)
- Student to teacher ratio: 6.97
- Campus type: Rural
- Colors: Black and red
- Athletics conference: 4A Region 4
- Sports: Football, Volleyball, Soccer, Track, Basketball, Cheer, Baseball, Softball, Golf, Tennis, Wrestling, Marching Band, Cross Country
- Mascot: Bearcat
- Team name: Mena Bearcats
- Accreditation: Arkansas Department of Education; AdvancED (1930–)
- Affiliations: Arkansas Activities Association
- Website: www.menaschools.org/o/mena-high-school

Mena High School is an accredited public secondary school located in Mena, Arkansas, United States. The school provides comprehensive education to more than 550 students annually in grades nine through twelve. Mena High School is the largest of three public high schools in Polk County and is the sole high school administered by the Mena School District.

== History ==
In 1975, two female students were expelled from Mena High School after spiking the punch at a party with two bottles of beer. Feeling the punishment was excessive, the students took legal action, and the case was eventually heard by the Supreme Court of the United States, which ruled that school boards have a responsibility to assure that the constitutional rights of students are upheld.

== Academics ==
The assumed course of study for students is to complete the Smart Core curriculum developed by the Arkansas Department of Education (ADE), which requires students complete at least 22 units for graduation. Students complete regular (core and career focus) courses and exams and may select Advanced Placement classes and exams with opportunities for college credit via AP exam. As of 2008–09, Mena High School offered 14 programs of study in career and technical education in 12 career pathways as determined by the Arkansas Department of Career Education. The school is accredited by the ADE and has been accredited by AdvancED since 1930.

== Extra Curriculars & Fine Arts ==
Students may participate in various musical and performing arts including band (concert band, jazz band), choir and theater (drama, stagecraft) The high school conducts on-campus performances at Mena's Ouachita Little Theatre, and on campus performances in the Performing Arts Center.

== Athletics ==
The Mena High School mascot is the bearcat with the school colors of red and black.

For the 2012–14 seasons, the Mena Bearcats participate in the 4A Classification within the 4A Region 4 Conference as sanctioned by the Arkansas Activities Association with student-athletes competing in football, volleyball, baseball, basketball (boys/girls), cross country (boys/girls), golf (boys/girls), soccer (boys/girls), softball, tennis (boys/girls), track and field (boys/girls).

- Football: Home football games are played at Randall Whorton Field at Boyd Stadium. The Mena Bearcats won a state football championship in 1976, and were state runner up in 2014.
- Soccer: Home boys and girls soccer games are also played at Randall Whorton Field at Boyd Stadium.
- Basketball: Home basketball games are played in the Union Bank Arena.
- Volleyball: Volleyball games are also played in the Union Bank Arena.

== Notable alumni ==
- Norris "Tuffy" Goff (1924)—Comedian in radio and film known for his portrayal of Abner Peabody on the rural comedy Lum and Abner.
- Chester Lauck (1920)—Comedian in radio and film known for his portrayal of Lum Edwards on the rural comedy Lum and Abner.
