= Dick Baldwin =

American actor (1911–1996)

- Baldwin in 1937
- Born: Robert Baldwin; January 9, 1911; St. Louis, Missouri, U.S.
- Died: October 28, 1996 (aged 85); Lebanon, Oregon, U.S.
- Occupation: Actor
- Years active: 1937-1944 (film)
- Spouse: Cecilia Parker (m. 1938; died 1993)

Dick Baldwin (born Robert Baldwin; January 9, 1911 – October 28, 1996) was an American film actor.

== Biography ==
Baldwin was born Robert Baldwin in St. Louis. His father, John H. Baldwin, owned the Baldwin Famous Shows carnival; his mother was Susan Turpin Baldwin. He attended Soldan High School and St. Louis University High School, graduating from the latter in 1925. His name was changed after he began working in films.

In his youth, Baldwin danced in the vaudeville act of Edith Clasper. In 1925 he was a member of the chorus in productions of the St, Louis Municipal Opera. After he finished high school he began performing with Paul Simmons's singers, a group that played the Orpheum Circuit for 37 consecutive weeks. That was followed by 40 weeks as a dancer with Fred Stone and Dorothy Stone in Three Cheers. After that production ended, he spent a year with Edith Clasper's Dancing Partners on the Orpheum Circuit in 1929. Next came a job as master of ceremonies for the Paramount-Publix theater chain, after which he danced, played third saxophone, and sang with Frank and Milt Britton's band in 1932. He and Virginia Watson formed a vaudeville team that performed in the New York area, and he worked with the Charles Emerson Cook Players in Atlanta.

Emanuel Cohen signed Baldwin to a film contract on December 30, 1936. His debut as a film singer came in Life Begins in College (1937).

On Broadway he was the stage manager for A Young Man's Fancy (1947).

Baldwin married actress Cecilia Parker on June 1, 1938, in Ventura, California. She died in 1993. They had a son.

== Filmography ==
Year	Title	Role	Notes
1937	Life Begins in College	Bob Hayner	
1937	Love and Hisses	Steve Nelson	
1938	International Settlement	Wally Burton	
1938	Mr. Moto's Gamble	Bill Steele	
1938	One Wild Night	Jimmy Nolan	
1938	Spring Madness	Doc	
1944	Knickerbocker Holiday	First Pal	Uncredited
1944	The Hairy Ape	Third Engineer	Uncredited
1944	Goin' to Town	Jimmy Benton	(final film role)

== Bibliography ==
- Philippa Gates. Detecting Men: Masculinity and the Hollywood Detective Film. SUNY Press, 2012.
