= Edith Clasper =

American dancer

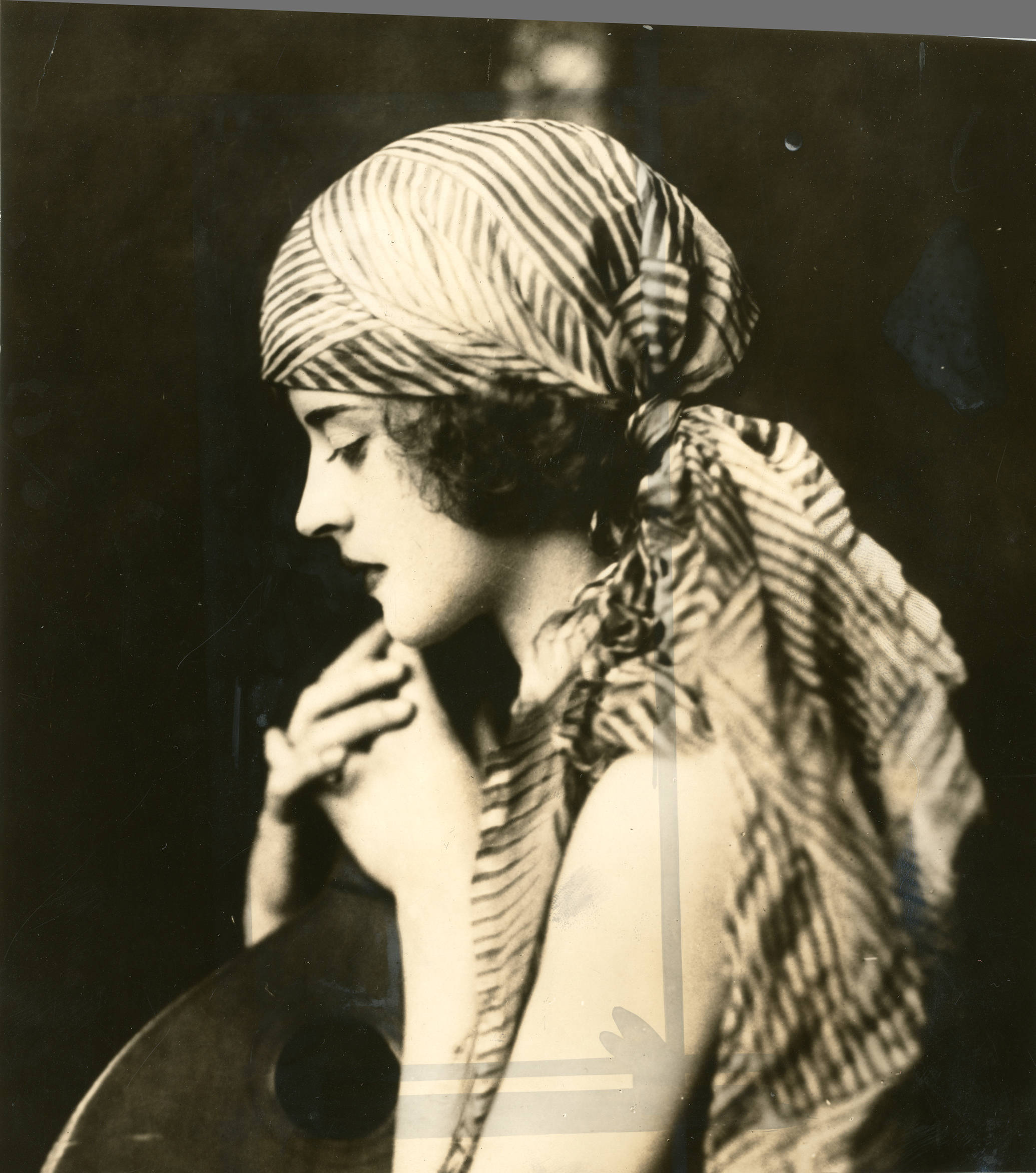
- Edith Clasper in 1924
- Born: October 12, 1894; Stranton, Hartlepool, U.K.
- Died: May 1984 (aged 89); United States
- Occupations: Dancer, vaudeville performer
- Years active: 1920s

Edith Crosbie Clasper (October 12, 1894 – May 1984) was an English-born American dancer active on the vaudeville stage in the 1920s.

== Early life and education ==
Clasper was born in Stranton, Hartlepool, the daughter of Robert Clasper and Barbara Crosbie Clasper. Her mother was born in Scotland. Her father died in 1898. Clasper moved to the United States as a little girl, with her widowed mother, and lived with relatives in Chicago.

== Career ==
Clasper was billed as "the daintiest of dancers". She headlined on tours of the United States and Canada in the 1920s, as the leader of Edith Clasper and Boys, a comedy dance act. She cautioned beginning dancers that "it is just downright hard work" and advised them to "dance, not only with your heels, but with your head." In 1920 she was stricken mid-performance with appendicitis in Madison, Wisconsin; her male assistants carried her off-stage and continued the act, while she took a train back to Chicago for medical attention.

The Pacific Coast Musical Review reported in 1920 that Clasper "has every asset necessary to the successful dancer — appearance, youth, grace, abandon, and poetry." The Montreal Star observed in 1923 that Clasper "obviously delights to dance. There is a freshness about her work that is infectious." Variety magazine reported on her stage costumes in detail.

In his youth, actor Dick Baldwin was one of the male dancers in Clasper's act.

== Personal life ==
Later in life, Clasper worked as a baby nurse for a family on Park Avenue. She became a naturalized United States citizen in 1953. She died in 1984, at the age of 89.
