= Chester Lauck =

American comedic actor (1902–1980)

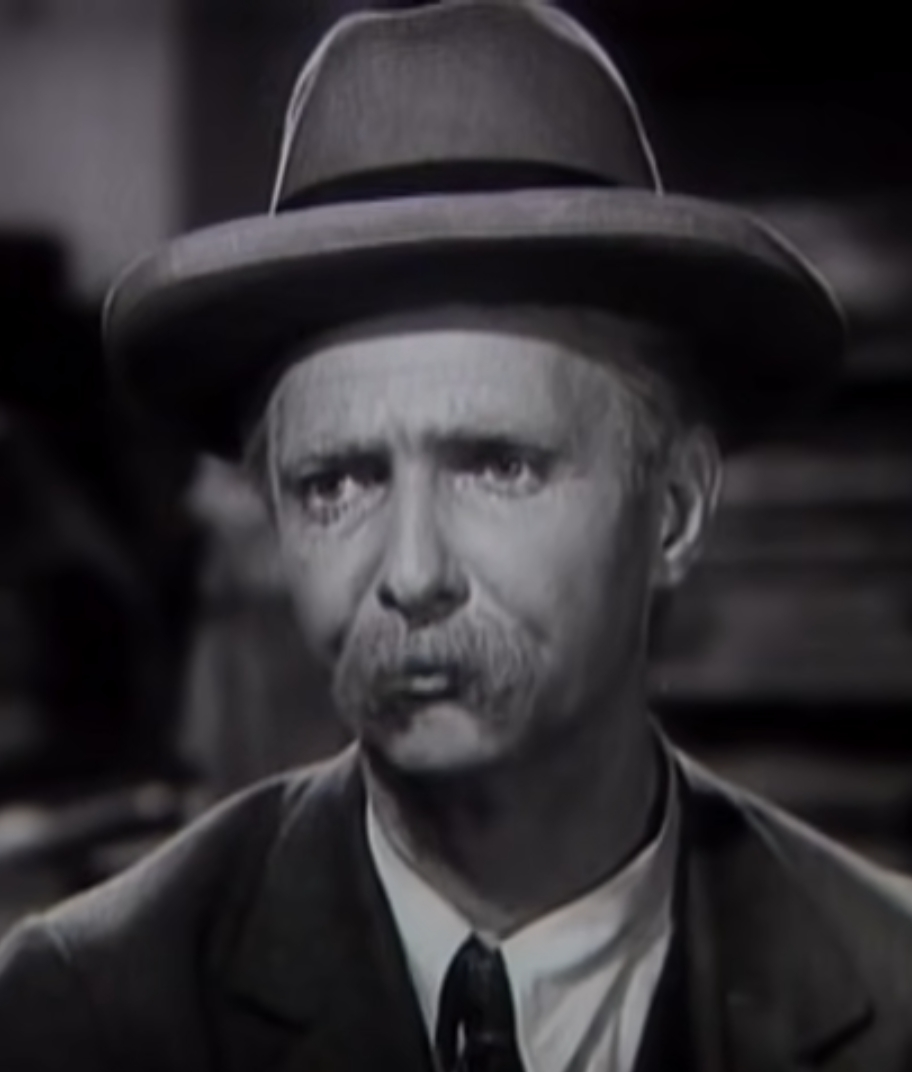
- Lauck as Lum in The Bashful Bachelor (1942)
- Born: Chester Lauck; February 9, 1902; Alleene, Arkansas, U.S.
- Died: February 21, 1980 (aged 78); Hot Springs, Arkansas, U.S.
- Occupation: Actor
- Years active: 1931–1954

Chester "Chet" Lauck (February 9, 1902 – February 21, 1980) was a comic actor who played the character of Lum Edwards on the classic American radio comedy Lum and Abner.

== Early life and career ==
Chester Lauck was born in Alleene, Arkansas, and raised in Mena, Arkansas. His parents were Mr. and Mrs. W. J. Lauck; his father was a bank president and lumber man. He graduated from Mena High School in 1920. After attending the University of Arkansas and the University of Oklahoma, he established the Citizen's Finance Company in Mena.

In Mena, Chet met his future comedy partner Norris Goff. Though both began as blackface comics, they soon found success on Hot Springs, Arkansas radio station KTHS with a weekly rural comedy skit, basing their characters on acquaintances from Waters, Arkansas. This led to an NBC network radio series, broadcast first from Chicago, Illinois, in 1931. The radio series aired on Mutual, CBS, and ABC at various times during its 1931–54 run. It was sponsored by Quaker Oats, the Ford Dealers of America, Horlick's Malted Milk, Postum, Alka-Seltzer, and Frigidaire.

In addition to starring as storekeeper Lum (full name Columbus Edwards, with surname usually pronounced "Eddards"), Lauck also played several other recurring characters, including Cedric Weehunt, Grandpappy Spears, and Snake Hogan. He reprised his radio role, opposite Goff, in seven motion pictures between 1940 and 1956. Lauck adopted grey hair and a moustache on-camera, to better match the picture most audiences would have of his radio character.

For a brief time during the 1950s he bought and upgraded a ranch fifteen miles west of Las Vegas, later bought by Howard Hughes. It was turned into Spring Mountain Ranch State Park.

In 1956, Lauck was executive assistant with Continental Oil in Houston, Texas. He was a vice president for public relations there for 12 years. He appeared as himself as well as Lum in a series of television commercials for Conoco on the programs Whirlybirds (1957–60) and The Blue Angels (1960–61). On August 27, 1957, he appeared as a guest challenger on To Tell the Truth.

Upon retirement from Continental Oil, Lauck moved to Hot Springs, Arkansas, and opened his own public relations agency with longtime associate Harlan Hobbs and son Chester Lauck Jr. Lauck Sr. was highly regarded as an after-dinner speaker and maintained a hectic schedule of appearances across the nation. During his California years, Lauck owned race horses which competed in Santa Anita. He served a five-year term on the Arkansas State Racing Commission.

In his later years, Lauck recorded new introductions for commercial cassette releases of the series and for syndication.

== Personal life and death ==
Lauck and his wife, the former Harriet Wood, had a son and two daughters. Lauck died in a hospital in Hot Springs, Arkansas, on February 21, 1980, aged 78.

== Honors ==
Lauck was inducted into the National Association of Broadcasters Hall of Fame in the radio division.

== Filmography ==
Year	Title	Role	Notes
1940	Dreaming Out Loud	Lum Edwards	
1942	The Bashful Bachelor	Lum Edwards	
1943	Two Weeks to Live	Lum Edwards	
1943	So This Is Washington	Lum Edwards	
1944	Goin' to Town	Lum Edwards	
1946	Partners in Time	Lum Edwards	
1956	Lum and Abner Abroad	Lum Edwards	(final film role)
