= The Middleton Family at the New York World's Fair =

1939 sponsored film

- The film's poster
- Directed by: Robert R. Snody
- Written by: Reed Drummond; G.R. Hunter
- Starring: Marjorie Lord; Jimmy Lydon; Ruth Lee; Harry Shannon; Adora Andrews; Douglas Stark; George J. Lewis; Georgette Harvey
- Cinematography: William O. Steiner
- Edited by: Sol E. Feuerman
- Music by: Edwin E. Ludig
- Color process: Technicolor
- Production company: Audio Productions Inc.
- Distributed by: Westinghouse Electric
- Release date: 1939
- Running time: 55 minutes
- Country: United States
- Language: English

The Middleton Family at the New York World's Fair is a 1939 sponsored film directed by Robert R. Snody produced by Westinghouse for their exhibit at the 1939 New York World's Fair.

In 2012, the film was selected for preservation in the National Film Registry, being deemed "culturally, historically, or aesthetically significant."

== Cast ==
- Marjorie Lord as Babs
- Jimmy Lydon as Bud
- Ruth Lee as Mother
- Harry Shannon as Father
- Adora Andrews as Grandma
- Douglas Stark as Jim Treadway
- George J. Lewis as Nicholas Makaroff
- Georgette Harvey as Maid

== Plot ==
The full film

The film follows a middle class family from Indiana who are visiting their grandmother in Huntington, Long Island and plan to go to the 1939 New York World's Fair. Younger son Bud is worried about opportunities for his future, while college age daughter Babs is going out with Nicolas Makaroff, her art teacher. Her family, however, likes her former boyfriend, Jim, who is working at the Fair.

Once at the Fair, much is made of the benefits of modern technology, especially electronics. The time capsule is presented as are demonstrations of television. Much time is taken up with how much electrical technology has aided housewifes and improved the conditions of housekeeping. For instance a demonstration is made by two women washing dishes, one by hand and the other with a dishwasher. Grandma considers the improvement to housework by electrical appliances women's "emancipation proclamation".

Not all are impressed, however. Makaroff scoffs that this is just a celebration of capitalism and that electronic labor saving devices, such as weavers, would put people out of jobs. Jim points out that there are more textile factories today than 100 years ago. A demonstration is finally given of Elektro, a robot who can speak and talk.

Back at home Bud writes a letter about what life would be like without the improvements of electricity. Makaroff gives Babs a ring that he says is priceless and comes from Moscow. After touring a shop in the city, the family finds many such rings and Babs breaks up with Makaroff, going back to Jim. When the family returns to the fair, they say they are really looking into the world of the future, while Grandma reminisces that she was a young girl at the World's Columbian Exposition, which first saw electric lights in America.
