= International Settlement (film) =

1938 film by Eugene Forde

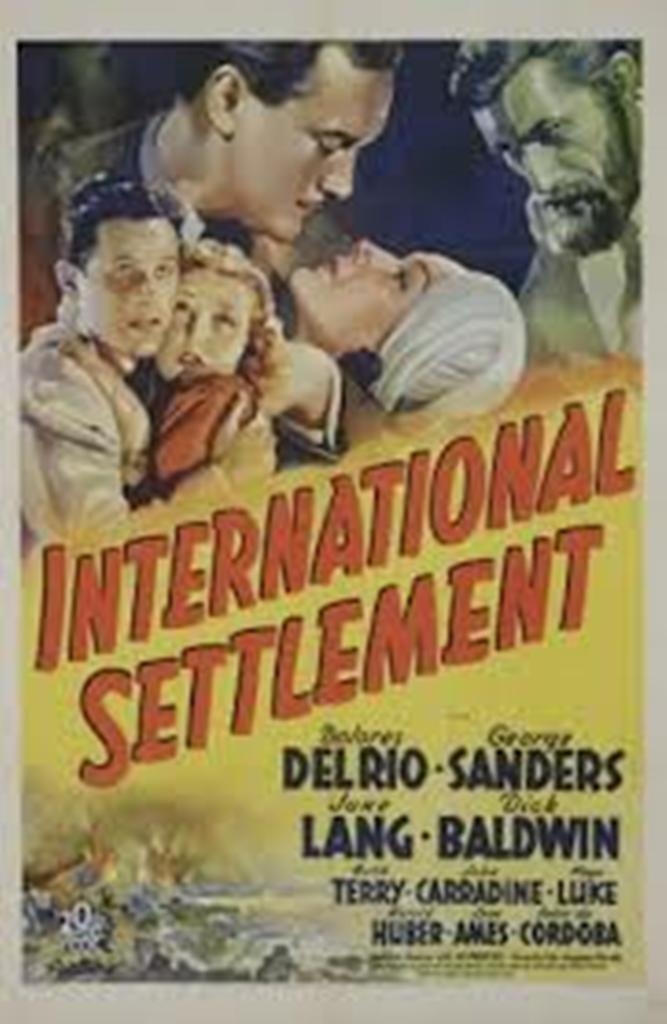
- Directed by: Eugene Forde
- Written by: Lou Breslow; Frank Fenton
- Produced by: Darryl F. Zanuck; Sol M. Wurtzel
- Starring: Dolores del Río; George Sanders; June Lang
- Edited by: Nick DeMaggio
- Music by: Samuel Kaylin
- Production company: 20th Century-Fox
- Distributed by: 20th Century-Fox
- Release date: February 4, 1938
- Running time: 75 minutes
- Country: United States
- Language: English

International Settlement is a 1938 American drama film directed by Eugene Forde and starring Dolores del Río, George Sanders and June Lang. It is set in the Shanghai International Settlement during the Sino-Japanese War. In the film, a gun runner falls in love with a beautiful French singer.

== Plot ==
The "International Settlement" is in the heart of Shanghai, where Western foreign powers had long controlled a protected enclave divided among 13 nations. Japanese forces have successfully overrun Peiping (Beijing) and are now heading for Shanghai. Newsreel footage (actual) shows Japanese bombers attacking Peiping and Chinese refugees fleeing south.

Del Forbes, a vagabond adventurer with a dapper mustache, sailing for China, is broke enough to agree to impersonate a fellow passenger, ailing munitions dealer Zabellu. Too ill to leave the ship, Zabellu pays Forbes to impersonate him in an illegal arms deal for which he's owed some 200,000 pounds, which Forbes understands is "nearly a million dollars!!"

Forbes gets the last hotel room in the British sector of the International Settlement, crowded with frightened people escaping from the Japanese invasion of Peiping in the north. Playing a suave, slightly condescending British cad, Forbes ignores the annoying advances of Joyce, a naïve American girl. Instead, he falls hard for Lenore, a stunning nightclub singer he first meets when she breaks into his room and tries to kill him She misses, but Forbes decides she is far too beautiful to turn over to the police, promptly inviting her to dinner later.

Forbes rickshaws to the "native city" – the Chinese quarter outside the Settlement – to carry through the deal with shady Joseph Lang and his partner Murdock. Forbes fights off an attack as he leaves with the money but when he delivers it to the ship, he learns Zabellu has died of natural causes. Forbes is now walking around Shanghai with the equivalent of a million dollars around his waist.

He meets Lenore for a romantic dinner, with a night of passion promised. He even tells her that his current situation has him "beginning to care whether I'm alive." Unaware that she's the wife of shady American munitions dealer Monte Silver, who also wants the money, Forbes goes with her to the Green Dragon, a bar in the Chinese quarter, where Monte is waiting for him. Just when Forbes realizes he's been set up by the woman he loves, Japanese bombers start attacking Shanghai; the two men struggle and Monte shoots Forbes in the arm. Lenore rushes into the room, where wounded Forbes has just enough time to congratulate her on her deception when the bar is hit by a bomb. Silver staggers off, leaving Lenore and Forbes unconscious in its wreckage.

With explosions all around them (including actual newsreel footage of the bombing of Shanghai), Lenore wakens and braves the bombing in the streets to search for a doctor for the dying Forbes, and finds one bandaging wounded Chinese peasants. Doctor Wong frees the unconscious Forbes from the beam that's crushed him and explains that only a transfusion will save his life. Though risky to attempt outside a hospital, the continued bombing has them trapped, so when Lenore begs to donate her compatible blood, Dr. Wong improvises a workable transfusion which saves Forbes' life. When Forbes wakes – unaware of what she's just done – he bitterly rejects Lenore again before collapsing. Lenore rushes off to get help and finds Joyce and her buddy, a ditzy newsreel cameraman, in the Chinese quarter but they arrive too late: the building where Forbes lay has been destroyed.

With Monte killing everyone in his way, he and Lenore board a ship heading for America with the money. They are surprised to find Forbes, alive if not entirely happy until Joyce explains all Lenore has done to save him. He visits her cabin just in time to watch Lenore point her gun at Monte as she takes the money and leave with Forbes. As they depart, Monte is killed by some other victim of his previous misdeeds.

== Cast ==
- Dolores del Río as Lenore Dixon
- George Sanders as Del Forbes
- June Lang as Joyce Parker
- Dick Baldwin as Wally Burton
- Ruth Terry as Vera Dale
- John Carradine as Murdock
- Keye Luke as Doctor Wong
- Harold Huber as Joseph Lang
- Leon Ames as Monte Silvers
- Pedro de Cordoba as Maurice Zabello
