= Constance Purdy =

American actress (1887–1960)

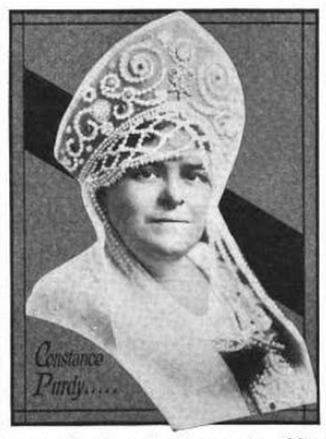
- Purdy from a 1914 publication
- Born: September 3, 1887; St. Louis, Missouri, U.S.
- Died: April 1, 1960 (aged 72); Los Angeles, California, U.S.
- Resting place: Forest Lawn Memorial Park, Glendale, California
- Occupation: Actress
- Years active: 1934–1952

Constance Purdy (August 3, 1887 – April 1, 1960) was an American film actress and classical music performer.

== Early life ==
Purdy was born in St. Louis, Missouri, on August 3, 1887, to American railroad executive Thomas C. Purdy and Janet Campbell Purdy. As a young girl she reportedly sang for Tsar Nicholas in Russia. At the age of 16 Purdy studied voice in Paris, rooming with future opera diva and film actress Geraldine Farrar, before embarking on a career as a contralto singer, lecturer, and translator of traditional Russian songs. Her friend and personal representative Mabel F. Hammond, often accompanied her on piano.

== Career ==
Purdy did not enter into film acting until 1934, with her first appearance, uncredited, being in the film Pursued starring Rosemary Ames. The 1930s saw her in four film appearances, only one of which was credited, that being in the 1935 film Thunder in the Night starring Edmund Lowe and Karen Morley. Most of her film appearances were in the 1940s, playing fifty different roles from 1940 to 1949, of which only six were credited. During the 1950s she had four film appearances, one of which was credited, and one television series appearance. She appeared in a 1951 episode of the TV series The Lone Ranger entitled "Trouble at Black Rock." During this period Purdy remained active in music circles, teaming up with Grace Widney Mabee, chair of the National Film Music Council, to launch Film Music Notes, and serving as the journal's co-editor.

== Death ==
Purdy retired after 1952, and was living in Los Angeles at the time of her death on April 1, 1960, aged 72. Her gravesite is at Forest Lawn Memorial Park in Glendale.

== Partial filmography ==
- Pursued (1934) - Tourist Welfare Worker (uncredited)
- Thunder in the Night (1935) - Cafe Owner's Wife (uncredited)
- Star for a Night (1936) - Townswoman (uncredited)
- Lloyd's of London (1936) - Singer (uncredited)
- The Bashful Bachelor (1942) - Widder Abernathy
- Rings on Her Fingers (1942) - Shopper (uncredited)
- Hi, Neighbor (1942) - Mrs. Wilson (uncredited)
- Now, Voyager (1942) - Rosa (uncredited)
- Shadow of a Doubt (1943) - Mrs. Martin (uncredited)
- The Powers Girl (1943) - School Board Member (uncredited)
- Air Raid Wardens (1943) - Disturbed Sleeper (uncredited)
- White Savage (1943) - Blossom
- Doughboys in Ireland (1943) - Miss Wood (uncredited)
- My Kingdom for a Cook (1943) - Woman in Employment Office (uncredited)
- Flesh and Fantasy (1943) - Sally (uncredited)
- Swing Out the Blues (1943) - Mrs. Ridgeway (uncredited)
- True to Life (1943) - Woman in Subway (uncredited)
- This Is the Life (1944) - Mrs. Ferguson (uncredited)
- Going My Way (1944) - Mrs. Quimp's Neighbor at Window (uncredited)
- Sensations of 1945 (1944) - Mme. Angostina (uncredited)
- Double Indemnity (1944) - Shopper in Market (uncredited)
- Louisiana Hayride (1944) - Mrs. Vandergrift (uncredited)
- Summer Storm (1944) - (uncredited)
- The National Barn Dance (1944) - Opera Singer (uncredited)
- My Buddy (1944) - Woman (uncredited)
- One Mysterious Night (1944) - Woman in Daley's Office (uncredited)
- And Now Tomorrow (1944) - Carrie (uncredited)
- Together Again (1944) - Fat Townswoman (uncredited)
- Adventures of Kitty O'Day (1945) - Woman in Ladies Spa (uncredited)
- Roughly Speaking (1945) - Tub Customer (uncredited)
- A Tree Grows in Brooklyn (1945) - (uncredited)
- Swing Out, Sister (1945) - Mrs. Bradstreet
- Bedside Manner (1945) - Mrs. Moriarty (uncredited)
- Penthouse Rhythm (1945) - Party Guest (uncredited)
- Rhapsody in Blue (1945) - Party Guest (uncredited)
- Love Letters (1945) - Fat Old Hag (uncredited)
- Men in Her Diary (1945) - Mrs. Williams (uncredited)
- This Love of Ours (1945) - Character Woman (uncredited)
- Spellbound (1945) - Dr. Brulov's Housekeeper (uncredited)
- Scarlet Street (1945) - Art Gallery Patron (uncredited)
- Miss Susie Slagle's (1946) - Mrs. Gerrity (uncredited)
- Cluny Brown (1946) - Onlooker Outside Bookstore (uncredited)
- One Exciting Week (1946) - Mrs. Lumley (uncredited)
- Vacation in Reno (1946) - Eleanor's Mother (uncredited)
- The Shocking Miss Pilgrim (1947) - Sarah Glidden (uncredited)
- Living in a Big Way (1947) - Committee Woman (uncredited)
- Unconquered (1947) - Fat Mother at the Ball (uncredited)
- Song of Love (1947) - Mrs. Hein (uncredited)
- Merton of the Movies (1947) - Landlady (uncredited)
- That Hagen Girl (1947) - Ruth Laverty - Gossip (uncredited)
- Jiggs and Maggie in Society (1947) - Mrs. Kelsey Chelsae Blackwell
- I Remember Mama (1948) - Fat Night Nurse (uncredited)
- Hollow Triumph (1948) - Mrs. Neyhmer (uncredited)
- Family Honeymoon (1948) - Helen Hockinson (uncredited)
- In the Good Old Summertime (1949) - Gushing Woman (uncredited)
- Madame Bovary (1949) - Mme. Foulard (uncredited)
- Love Happy (1949) - Woman with Chihuahua Dog (uncredited)
- Blonde Dynamite (1950) - Second Dowager at Opera
- Please Believe Me (1950) - Fat Woman (uncredited)
- Pretty Baby (1950) - Stout Lady (uncredited)
- The Snows of Kilimanjaro (1952) - Guest (uncredited)
