= Spring Madness =

1938 film by S. Sylvan Simon

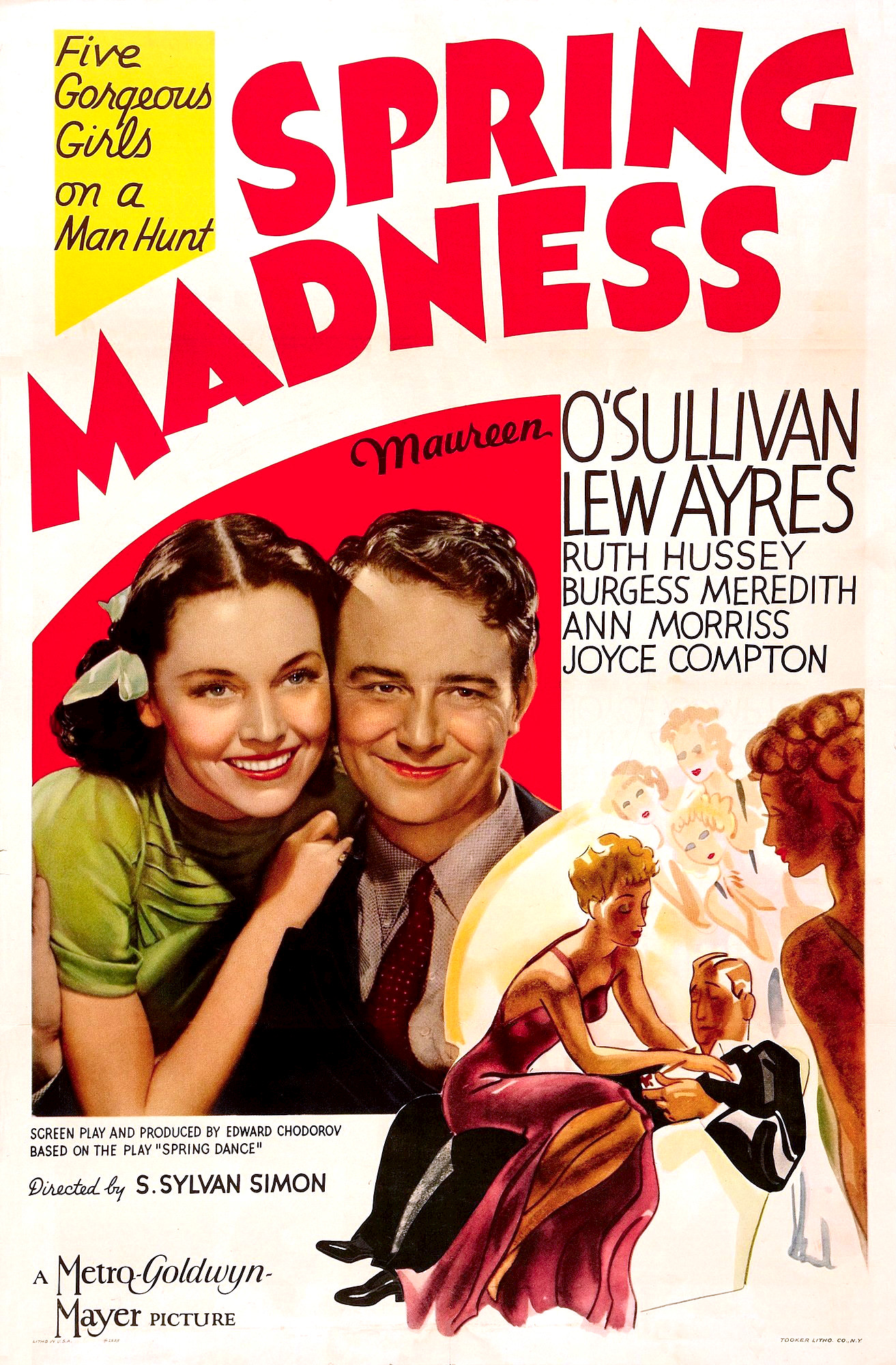
- Directed by: S. Sylvan Simon
- Screenplay by: Edward Chodorov
- Based on: Spring Dance; 1936 play by Philip Barry
- Produced by: Edward Chodorov
- Starring: Maureen O'Sullivan; Lew Ayres; Ruth Hussey; Burgess Meredith
- Cinematography: Joseph Ruttenberg
- Edited by: Conrad A. Nervig
- Music by: William Axt
- Production company: Metro-Goldwyn-Mayer
- Distributed by: Loew's Inc.
- Release date: November 11, 1938
- Running time: 67 minutes
- Country: United States
- Language: English

Spring Madness is a 1938 American romantic comedy film based on the play of the same title by Philip Barry. It was directed by S. Sylvan Simon for Metro-Goldwyn-Mayer, and stars Maureen O'Sullivan, Lew Ayres, Ruth Hussey and Burgess Meredith.

== Plot ==
In their last semester at Harvard, Sam Thatcher and his roommate, who is nicknamed "The Lippencott", have grand ideas of seeing the remote corners of the world, they having booked passage on a freighter from New York to Siberia, the trip immediately after they graduate. They plan to live and observe the economic life there for two years before they settle down. They've had such plans since they were freshmen, not wanting to be tied down to the American rat race immediately following graduation. Sam, however, has not mentioned any of these plans to his girlfriend, Alex Benson, also a student in her final semester at the New England College for Women.

Alex wants Sam to attend the college's spring dance with her to be able to show him off to the other girls, the dance a rite of passage to a serious commitment. Sam doesn't want to lead Alex on by attending but also doesn't want to miss one last opportunity to see her. His plan to graduate and attend the dance hits a snag when the sailing is moved up by two weeks, it now at the end of the weekend of the dance. Lipp, who has a mole in a mutual friend named Hat who goes to the college every weekend to visit with his girl, Frances, a friend of Alex's, doesn't trust Sam, who he feels may leave him in the lurch by not going on the trip to Siberia. Knowing that Sam, against his word, will be going to the college to see Alex anyway, Lipp decides to ambush him at the college to make sure he says his goodbyes and heads to New York for the sailing. The weekend thus becomes a race between Alex's friends, who, without Alex's knowledge, do whatever they can to ensure Sam doesn't want to make that ship, and Lipp who knows there's something afoot behind all those feminine curls. Added to the fray is the fact that the dance is being attended by boys from all the Ivy League schools, who have a friendly or not so friendly rivalry with Harvard.

== Cast ==
- Maureen O'Sullivan as Alexandra Benson
- Lew Ayres as Sam Thatcher
- Ruth Hussey as Kate McKim
- Burgess Meredith as The Lippencott
- Ann Morriss as Frances
- Joyce Compton as Sally Prescott
- Julie Bishop as Mady Platt (as Jacqueline Wells)
- Frank Albertson as Hat
- Truman Bradley as Walter Beckett
- Marjorie Gateson as Miss Ritchie
- Renie Riano as Mildred (misspelled Renee Riano in film's closing credits)
- Sterling Holloway as Buck
- Dick Baldwin as Doc
- J.M. Kerrigan as Mr. Maloney (uncredited)
