= Huddleston Store and McKinzie Store =

- U.S. National Register of Historic Places
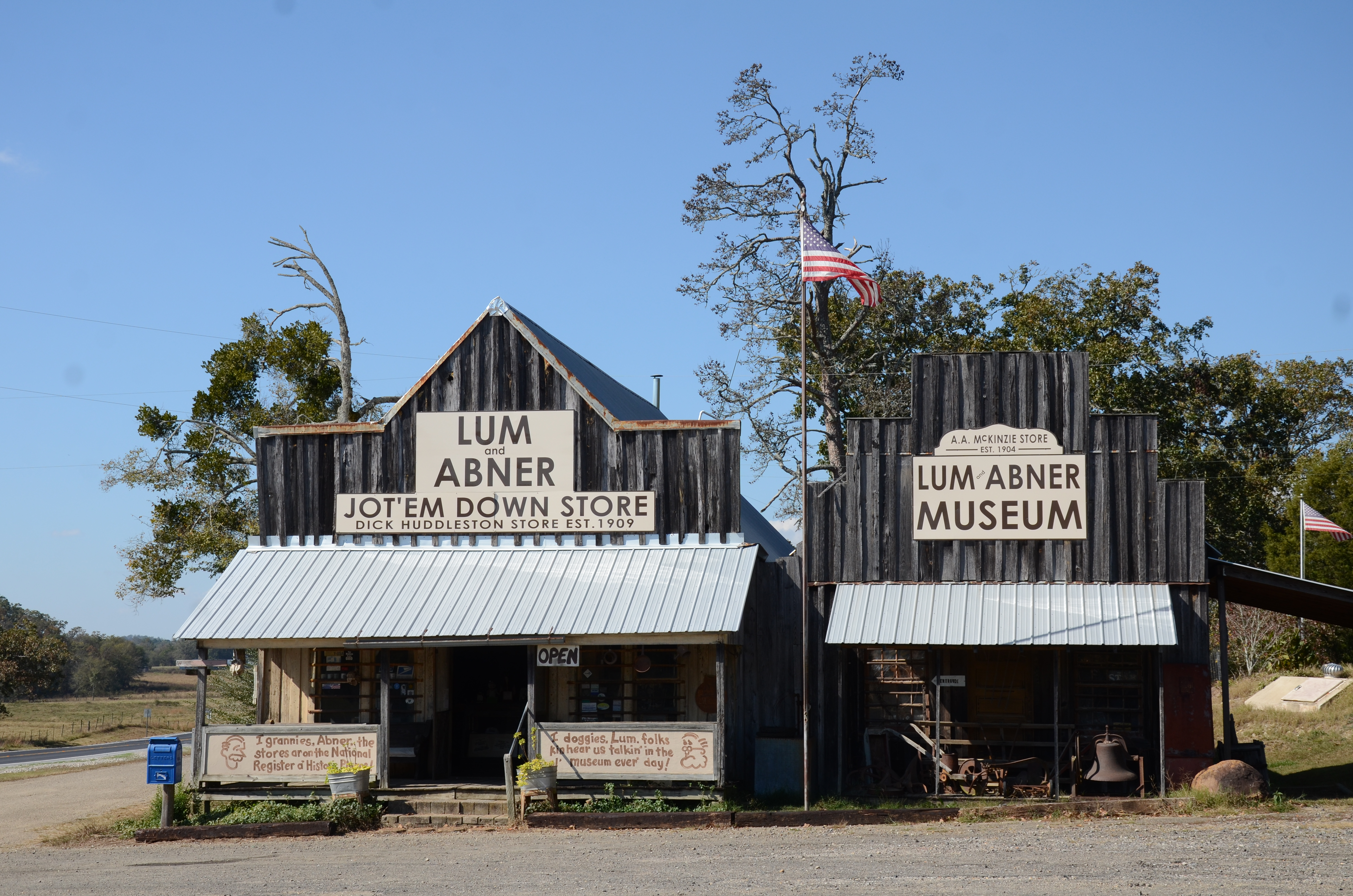

- Location within Arkansas Location within the United States
- Location: AR 88, Pine Ridge, Arkansas
- Coordinates: 34°35′0″N 93°54′18″W
- Area: less than one acre
- Built: 1904
- Architect: Dick Huddleston, A.A. McKinzie
- NRHP reference No.: 84000007
- Added to NRHP: October 4, 1984

The Huddleston Store and McKinzie Store, also known as the Lum 'n' Abner Jot 'Em Down Store and Museum, are a historic museum property on Arkansas Highway 88 in Pine Ridge, Arkansas. These two wood-frame retail buildings are all that remain of the pre-1920 buildings of the town; they were constructed by Dick Huddleston in 1912 and A.A. McKinzie in 1904, respectively. They now house a museum devoted to the radio show Lum and Abner, a comedy program featuring a fictional Pine Ridge based on this town, which was originally called Waters. It was renamed to Pine Ridge to honor the radio show's setting.

The property was listed on the National Register of Historic Places in 1984.
