= One Wild Night (film) =

1938 film by Eugene Forde

- Theatrical release poster
- Directed by: Eugene Forde
- Screenplay by: Charles Belden; Jerome Cady
- Story by: Edwin Dial Torgerson
- Produced by: John Stone
- Starring: June Lang; Dick Baldwin; Lyle Talbot; J. Edward Bromberg; Sidney Toler; Andrew Tombes
- Cinematography: Harry Davis
- Edited by: Nick DeMaggio
- Production company: 20th Century Fox
- Distributed by: 20th Century Fox
- Release date: June 10, 1938
- Running time: 72 minutes
- Country: United States
- Language: English

One Wild Night is a 1938 American comedy film directed by Eugene Forde. The screenplay was written by Charles Belden and Jerome Cady after a story by Edwin Dial Torgetson. The film stars June Lang, Dick Baldwin, Lyle Talbot, J. Edward Bromberg, Sidney Toler and Andrew Tombes. The film was released on June 10, 1938, by 20th Century Fox.

== Plot ==
Four men withdraw large quantities of money from the same bank and then disappear, now reporter Jewel and crime student Jimmy Nolan investigate the possible extortion ring.

== Cast ==
- June Lang as Gale Gibson aka Jennifer Jewel
- Dick Baldwin as Jimmy Nolan
- Lyle Talbot as Singer Martin
- J. Edward Bromberg as Norman
- Sidney Toler as Lawton
- Andrew Tombes as Police Chief William Nolan
- William Demarest as Editor Collins
- Romaine Callender as Ogden Hepple
- Jan Duggan as Mrs. Halliday
- Spencer Charters as Lem Halliday
- Harlan Briggs as Mayor
