= Ruth Lee =

American actress

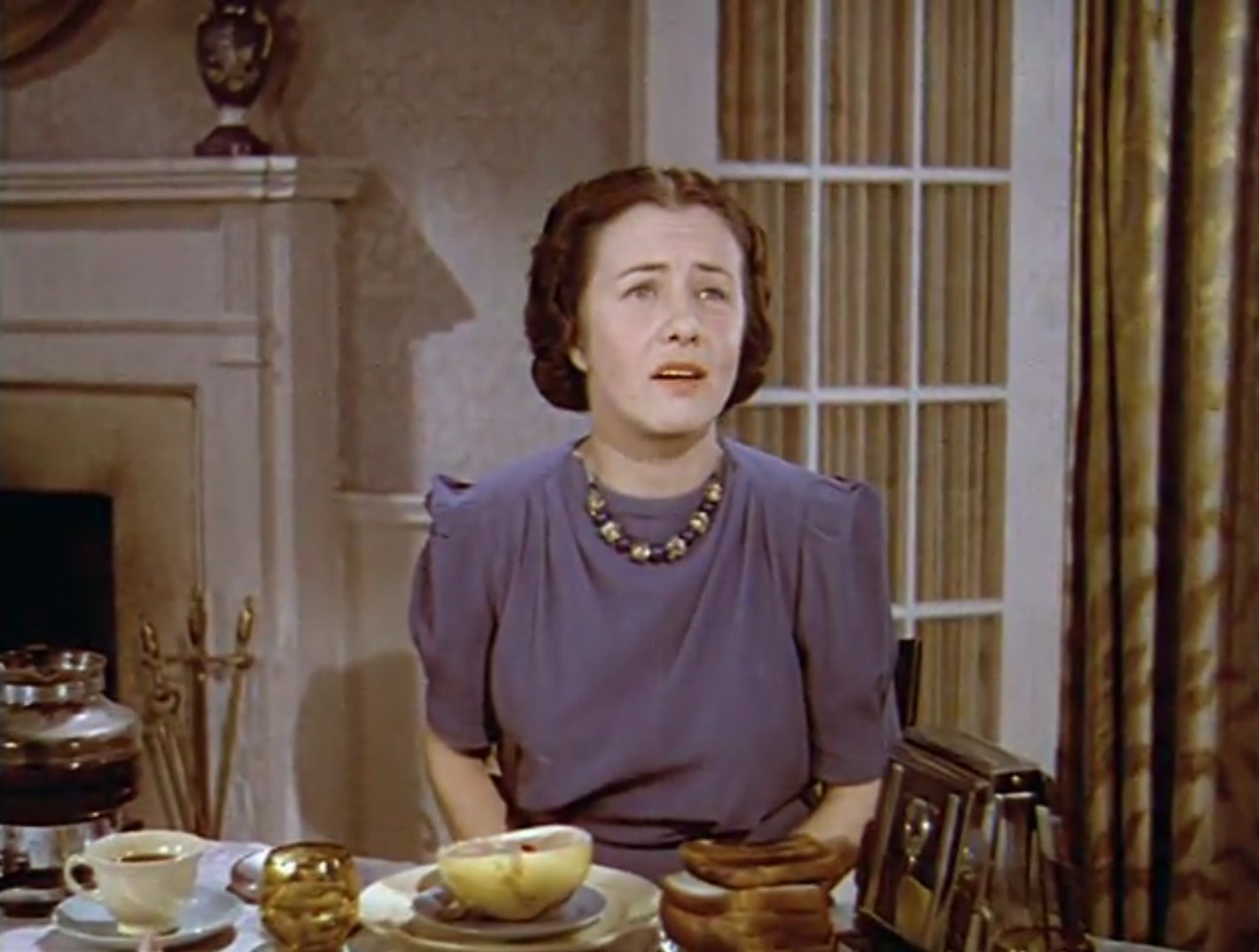
- Lee in The Middleton Family at the New York World's Fair (1939)
- Born: September 14, 1895; Minneapolis, Minnesota, US
- Died: August 3, 1975 (aged 79); Woodland Hills, Los Angeles, California, US
- Occupation: Actress
- Years active: 1932–1960

Ruth Lee (September 14, 1895 – August 3, 1975) was an American stage and film actress. She was born in Minneapolis, Minnesota, and graduated from a dramatic school there.

Lee acted in stock theater with the National Theatre in Washington, D.C. Her other activities on stage included three years with the Shubert Theater in Minneapolis. She also acted in New York, including on Broadway. Her Broadway debut was as a member of the chorus in Apple Blossoms (1919), and her final Broadway role was Muriel Payne in Your Loving Son (1941).

She was married to the actor Grandon Rhodes. Lee died in Woodland Hills, Los Angeles, California at the age of 79.

== Partial filmography ==
- The Rich Are Always with Us (1932) - Second Gossiper in 1920 (uncredited)
- Sued for Libel (1939) - Radio Actress (uncredited)
- The Middleton Family at the New York World's Fair (1939) - Mother
- Not a Ladies' Man (1942) - Jennie Purcell
- Get Hep to Love (1942) - Woman (uncredited)
- Behind the Eight Ball (1942) - Woman (uncredited)
- Shadow of a Doubt (1943) - Mrs. MacCurdy (uncredited)
- Silver Skates (1943) - Mrs. Martin
- Rhythm of the Islands (1943) - Miss Widdicomb
- Good Morning, Judge (1943) - Paula (uncredited)
- Hers to Hold (1943) - Miss Crawford (uncredited)
- Mexican Spitfire's Blessed Event (1943) - Mrs. Fred Walters (uncredited)
- The Adventures of a Rookie (1943) - Mrs. Linden (uncredited)
- Moonlight in Vermont (1943) - Miss Evans
- Tucson Raiders (1944) - Hannah Rogers
- Sensations of 1945 (1944) - Mrs. Gustafson (uncredited)
- The Soul of a Monster (1944) - Woman in Sedan (uncredited)
- Goin' to Town (1944) - Mrs. Wentworth
- The Town Went Wild (1944) - Lucille Conway
- Music for Millions (1944) - Nurse (uncredited)
- Hi, Beautiful (1944) - Mother (uncredited)
- Here Come the Co-Eds (1945) - Miss Holford
- Keep Your Powder Dry (1945) - Classroom Instructor (uncredited)
- The Man Who Walked Alone (1945) - Aunt Harriett
- G. I. Honeymoon (1945) - Mrs. Barton
- Corpus Christi Bandits (1945) - Mom Christie
- I'll Tell the World (1945) - Ethel (uncredited)
- The Naughty Nineties (1945) - (uncredited)
- On Stage Everybody (1945) - Barbara (uncredited)
- Anchors Aweigh (1945) - Kindergarten Teacher (uncredited)
- Mama Loves Papa (1945) - Mabel
- Divorce (1945) - Liz Smith
- Swingin' on a Rainbow (1945) - Landlady (uncredited)
- Week-End at the Waldorf (1945) - The Woman (uncredited)
- Sing Your Way Home (1945) - Bridget's Mother (scenes deleted)
- The Daltons Ride Again (1945) - Mrs. Maggie Bohannon (uncredited)
- Idea Girl (1946) - Abigail Hawthorne
- Swing Parade of 1946 (1946) - Matron (uncredited)
- Partners in Time (1946) - Miss Martha Thurston
- Ding Dong Williams (1946) - Laura Cooper
- Cuban Pete (1946) - Woman on Table (uncredited)
- The Stranger (1946) - Minor Role (uncredited)
- The Dark Horse (1946) - Mrs. Aldrich
- Holiday in Mexico (1946) - (uncredited)
- Sister Kenny (1946) - Mother (uncredited)
- Magnificent Doll (1946) - Mrs. Gallentine (uncredited)
- The Magnificent Rogue (1946) - Lita Andrews
- Monsieur Verdoux (1947) - Gossipy Woman Hanging Clothes (uncredited)
- Dark Delusion (1947) - Nurse (uncredited)
- The Secret Life of Walter Mitty (1947) - Commentator (uncredited)
- Cass Timberlane (1947) - Nurse (uncredited)
- The Judge Steps Out (1948) - Welfare Worker (uncredited)
- Larceny (1948) - Patricia Carson (uncredited)
- Annie Was a Wonder (1949, Short) - Mrs. Nesbitt
- Henry, the Rainmaker (1949) - Schoolteacher
- Cover Up (1949) - Mrs. Abbey
- It Happens Every Spring (1949) - Miss Collins - Prof. Greenleaf's Secretary (uncredited)
- Everybody Does It (1949) - Recital Guest / Party Guest (uncredited)
- The Lady Takes a Sailor (1949) - Miss Brand (uncredited)
- Whirlpool (1950) - Miss Hall (uncredited)
- Your Witness (1950) - Miss Hubert - Heyward's New York Secretary
- Shadow on the Wall (1950) - First Nurse (uncredited)
- The Company She Keeps (1951) - Matron (uncredited)
- Payment on Demand (1951) - Aunt Edna (uncredited)
- Insurance Investigator (1951) - Miss Pringle
- When I Grow Up (1951) - Bully's Mother
- Chain of Circumstance (1951) - Nurse (uncredited)
- As You Were (1951)
- On Dangerous Ground (1951) - Helen (uncredited)
- Young Man with Ideas (1952) - Secretary (uncredited)
- Skirts Ahoy! (1952) - Mrs. Yarbrough (uncredited)
- Crime Wave (1953) - 3rd Police Broadcaster (uncredited)
- The Long, Long Trailer (1954) - Mrs. Tewitt (uncredited)
- Gypsy Colt (1954) - Miss Hartner (uncredited)
- Hell's Outpost (1954) - Mrs. Moffit
- Lucy Gallant (1955) - Hazel (uncredited)
- Alfred Hitchcock Presents (1956) (TV – Season 1 Episode 14: "A Bullet for Baldwin") - Neighbor
- Terror at Midnight (1956) - Mrs. Lang (uncredited)
- High Society (1956) - Ruth - Jazz Festival Organizer (uncredited)
- These Wilder Years (1956) - Miss Adelaide Finch (uncredited)
- Hot Shots (1956) - Mrs. Morley (uncredited)
- Jet Pilot (1957) - Mother (uncredited)
- Wild Is the Wind (1957) - Party Guest
- Decision (1958) (TV – Season 1 Episode 6: "Indemnity") - Waitress
- Toby Tyler (1960) - Wife in Audience (uncredited)
