= So This Is Washington =

1943 film by Ray McCarey

- Theatrical release poster
- Directed by: Ray McCarey
- Screenplay by: Leonard Praskins; Roswell Rogers
- Story by: Roswell Rogers; Edward James
- Based on: the radio program, Lum and Abner created by Chester Lauck and Norris Goff
- Produced by: Ben Hersh; Jack William Motion
- Starring: Chester Lauck; Norris Goff
- Cinematography: Harry J. Wild
- Edited by: W. Duncan Mansfield
- Music by: Lucien Moraweck
- Production company: Jack Wm. Votion Productions
- Distributed by: RKO Radio Pictures
- Release date: August 17, 1943 (US)
- Running time: 64 minutes
- Country: United States
- Language: English

So This Is Washington is a 1943 American comedy film directed by Ray McCarey starring Chester Lauck. The film was nominated for the Academy Award for Best Sound Recording (James L. Fields). It is also known as Dollar A Year Man.

== Plot ==
Abner Peabody runs the Jot 'Em Down general store in Pine Ridge, Arkansas. When listening to the radio one day, he hears Chester Marshall, head of the Civilian Aid on the War Effort Board, pleading to the people and asking for help to come up with inventions and ideas that could be used to improve life during wartime.

Abner decides to build a chemistry lab in his own basement. Soon he develops a new improved formula for manufacturing synthetic rubber. His partner Lum Edwards wants them to go to Washington D.C. to present their work to Marshall.

When the two men arrive in Washington, they have a hard time finding housing for their stay. They are offered lodging by an unknown man they meet in a park, but it turns out the room they are given is the bedroom displayed in a department store window. As they wake up in the morning, they are chased out of the store, but they encounter an old friend of theirs who is a newspaper columnist, Robert Blevine.

Robert invites them to stay at his house instead, and accompanies them to see Marshall. They have to wait in line to see him though, since hordes of people have gathered for the same reason. Robert is scolded by Marshall's secretary because of his harsh articles in the paper about him, while Abner and Lum go see the sights around the city.

While resting on a park bench, Lum listens to a conversation a senator has with another man, about drought problems in his state. Lum interrupts the conversation and advises the senator to plant worms to remedy the soil. Lum goes on to advise a congressman on stopping migration from small-towns to the big cities.

Lum and Abner develop quite the reputation around Washington, and word gets around that they are great consultants. They get a lot of visitors wanting to get their advice even as they are sitting on the park bench. After a while, Marshall shows up by the bench, and the two men show him their rubber invention. He is very pleased with their discovery and calls for an immediate press conference.

During the press conference, Abner is hit in the head by a falling statue, and knocked unconscious. When he wakes up again, he has lost his near memory and forgotten his rubber formula. The press doesn't believe he ever had a working formula and Marshall is publicly humiliated. Marshall gets an ultimatum, to produce Abner's formula in a week or he will lose his job.

Marshall decides to accompany Lum and Abner home to Pine Ridge, to try to extract the formula from Abner in his home environment. Abner ultimately gets his memory back as he hits his head once again, and finally remembers the formula on the last day of the ultimatum deadline.

Both Lum and Abner are rewarded for their great service to the country, and appointed heads of a special committee on farming problems and Marshall's reputation is restored.

== Cast ==
- Chester Lauck as Lum Edwards
- Norris Goff as Abner
- Alan Mowbray as Chester W. Marshall
- Mildred Coles as Jane Nestor – Marshall's Secretary
- Roger Clark as Robert Blevins
- Sarah Padden as Aunt Charity Speers
- Matt McHugh as Stranger in Park Renting 'Rooms'

== Soundtrack ==
- The band – "For He's a Jolly Good Fellow" (Traditional)
- "Columbia, the Gem of the Ocean" (Music and Lyrics by David T. Shaw, Arranged by Thomas A. Beckett)
- "Battle Hymn of the Republic" (Music by William Steffe, Lyrics by Julia Ward Howe)
