= Soldiers' Memorial Library =

- U.S. National Register of Historic Places
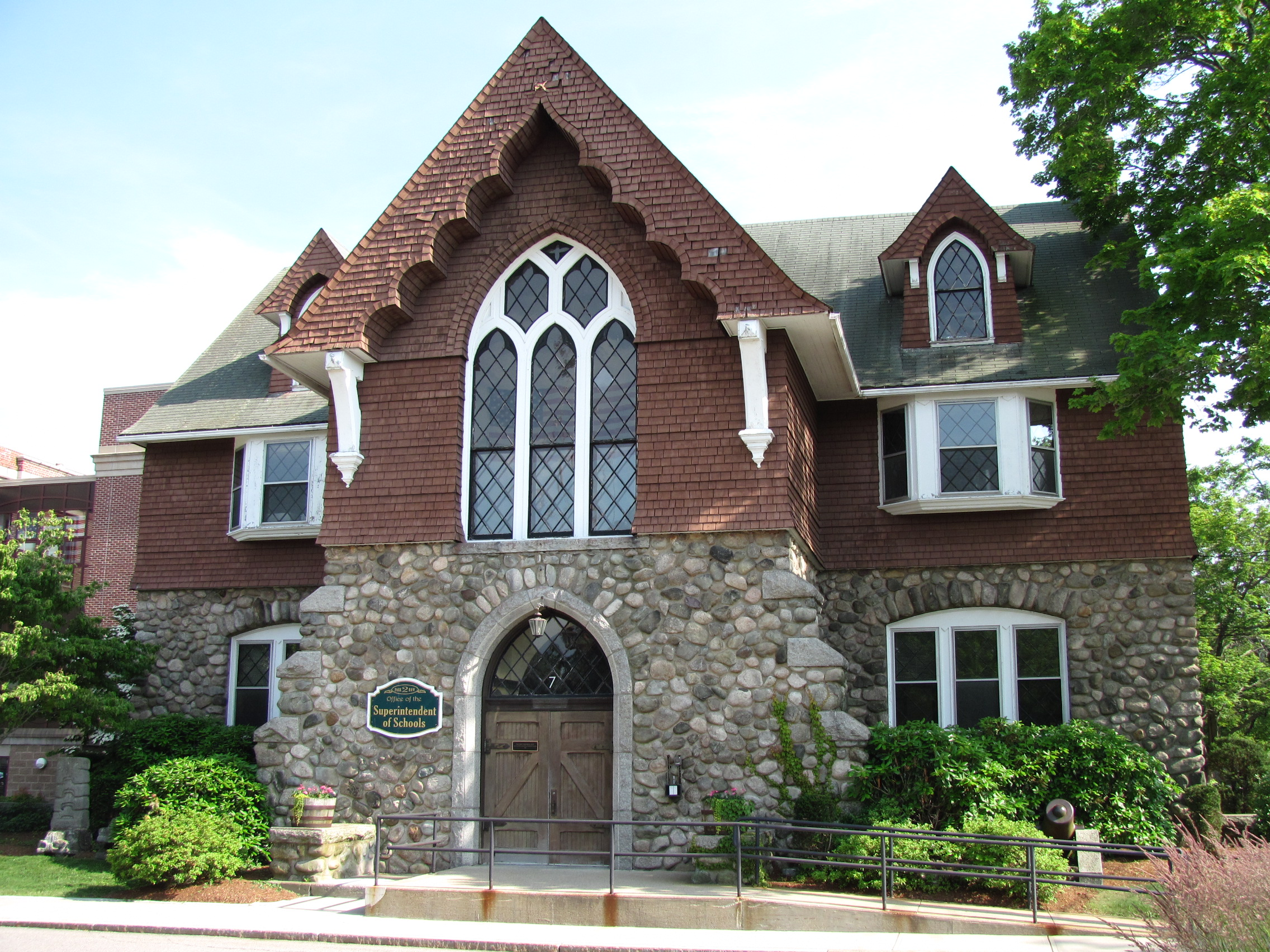
- Soldiers' Memorial Library

- Location within Massachusetts Location within the United States
- Location: Mansfield, Massachusetts
- Coordinates: 42°1′24″N 71°13′2″W
- Built: 1901
- Architect: Peabody & Stearns
- Architectural style: Shingle Style, Late Gothic Revival
- NRHP reference No.: 95000681
- Added to NRHP: June 2, 1995

Soldiers' Memorial Library is a historic library building at the junction of Park Row and Union Street in Mansfield, Massachusetts. The 2 1/2-story Gothic Revival structure was designed by the noted firm of Peabody and Stearns, and built in 1899–1901. The building and land were primarily a gift from Elizabeth F. Noble. It was designed to house the public library on the ground floor, and provide a memorial to the town's American Civil War soldiers on the upper floor.

The building was listed on the National Register of Historic Places in 1995. In 2013 the building was housing school administrative offices.

== See also ==
- National Register of Historic Places listings in Bristol County, Massachusetts
