= Elektro =

Early robot

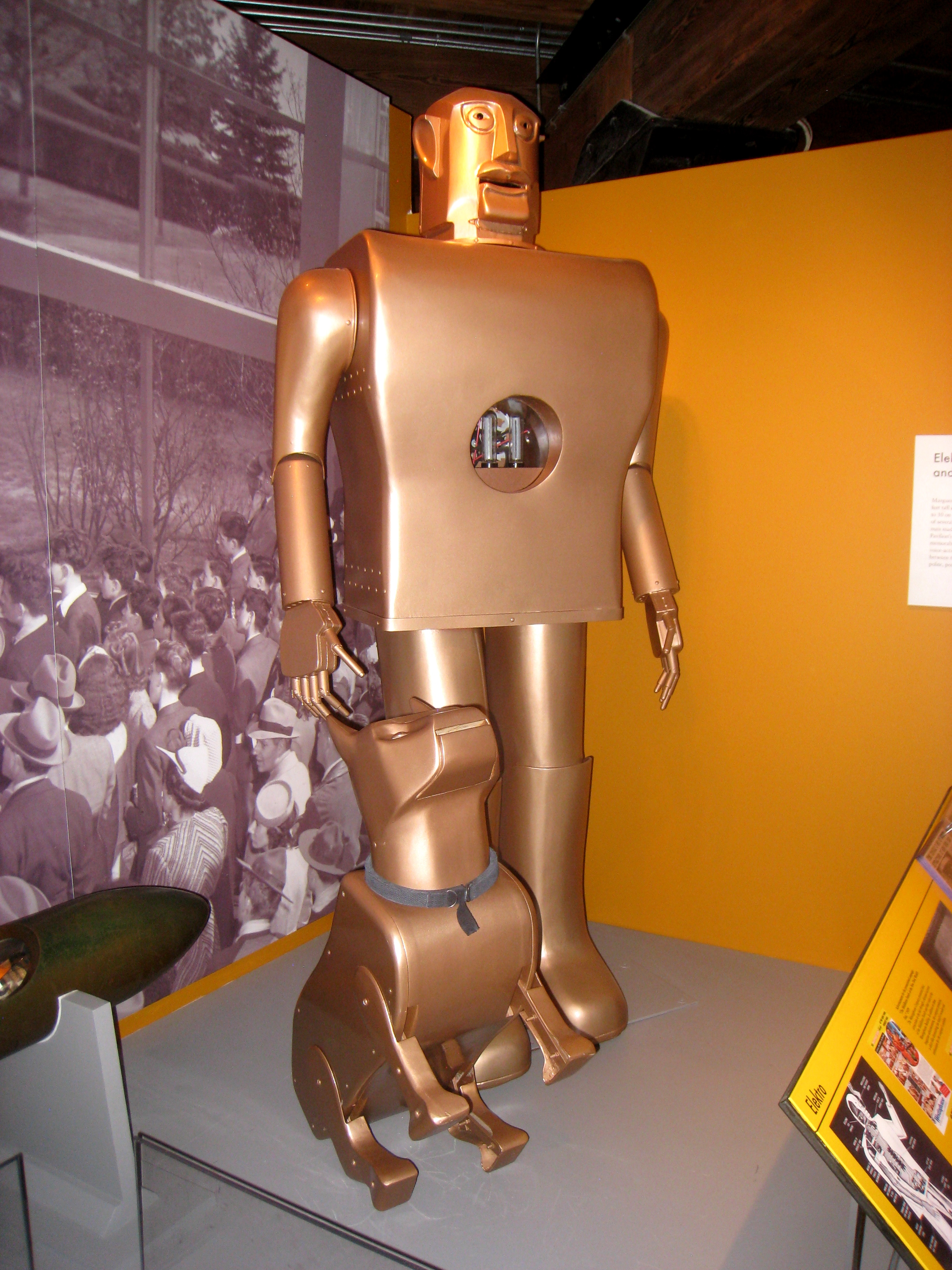
Replicas of Elektro the moto-man and his little dog Sparko

Elektro is a robot built by J.M. Barnett, Jack Weeks Sr., Harold Gorsuch, and other engineers at the Westinghouse Electric Corporation's Mansfield, Ohio, facility between 1937 and 1938.

== Physical specifications ==
Seven feet tall (2.1 m), weighing 265 pounds (120 kg), humanoid in appearance, he could walk by voice command, speak about 700 words (using a 78-rpm record player), smoke cigarettes, blow up balloons, and move his head and arms. Elektro's body consisted of a steel gear, cam and motor skeleton covered by an aluminum skin. His photoelectric "eyes" could distinguish red and green light.

== Exhibit history ==
Elektro was on exhibit at the 1939 New York World's Fair and was joined at that fair in 1940, with "Sparko", a robot dog that could bark, sit, and beg to humans.

Several minutes of color sound footage of Elektro in action can be seen at 33:55 in the movie, The Middleton Family at the New York World's Fair, a fully-produced hour-long movie made by Westinghouse, which showcased the Westinghouse pavilion.

Elektro toured North America in 1950 in promotional appearances for Westinghouse, and was displayed at Pacific Ocean Park in Ocean Park, Santa Monica, California, "which was in operation from 1958 to 1967, as part of the House of Tomorrow exhibit.

Elektro appeared as "Thinko", in Sex Kittens Go to College (1960).

In 2026, Elektro was placed on permanent display in the North Cental Ohio Industrial Museum located inside the Ohio State Reformatory in his hometown of Mansfield, Ohio.

== Property dispute ==
All original pieces of Elektro were eventually located and restored. Elektro was on display at The Mansfield Memorial Museum in Mansfield, Ohio. Elektro is currently the subject of a property dispute by Weeks' family, Schaut's heirs and the Mansfield Memorial Museum. In 2013, a replica of Elektro was exhibited at The Henry Ford Museum in Dearborn, Michigan.

Sparko's fate is unknown. In the 1960s, his head was given to Harold Gorsuch, a retiring Westinghouse engineer.
