= Pine Ridge, Oklahoma =

Unincorporated community in Oklahoma, US

- Unincorporated community
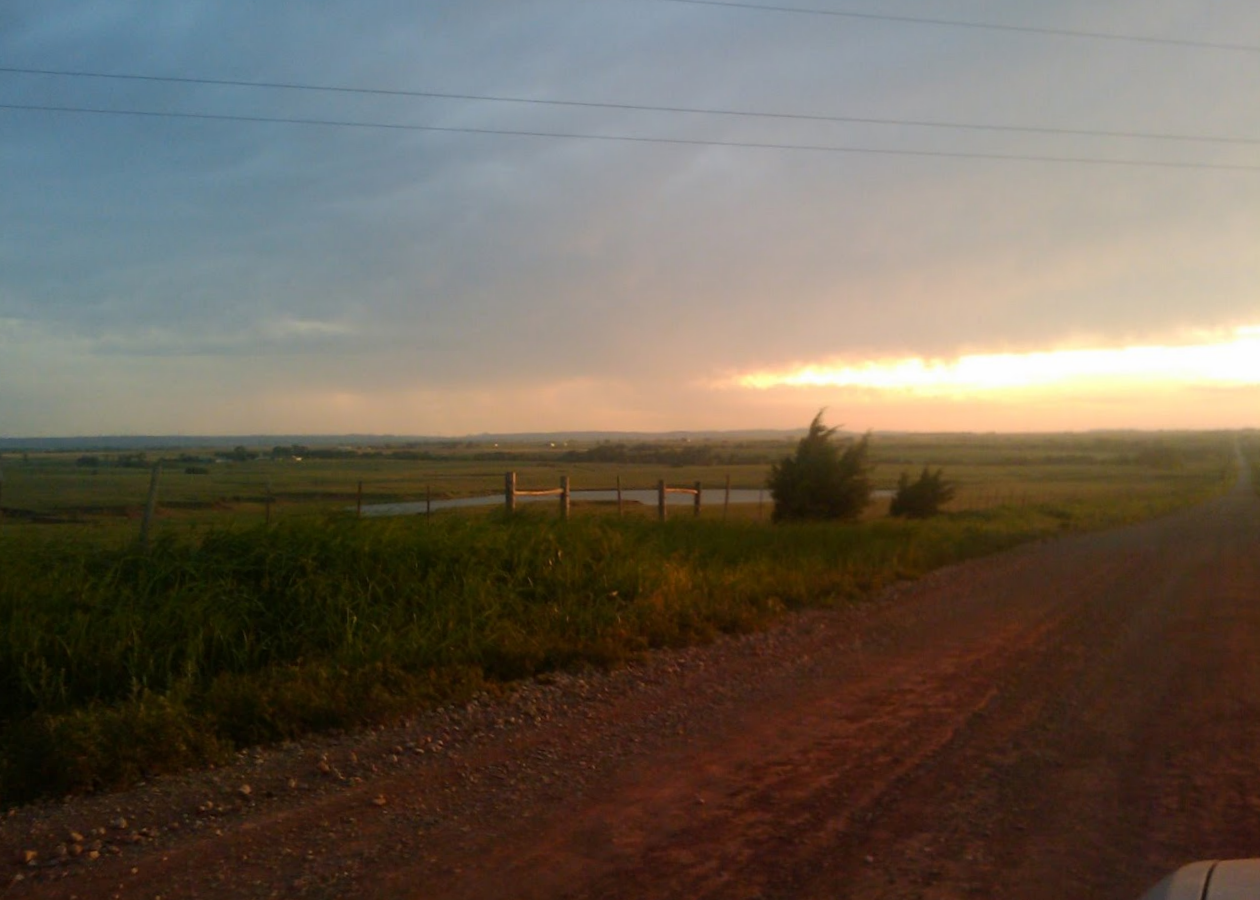
- Sunset on June 6, 2009 at Pine Ridge

- Location within the state of Oklahoma Pine Ridge (the United States)
- Coordinates: 35°01′7.5″N 98°28′5.31″W
- Country: United States
- State: Oklahoma
- County: Caddo
- Elevation: 1,460 ft (445 m)
- Time zone: UTC-6 (Central (CST))
  - Summer (DST): UTC-5 (CDT)
- GNIS feature ID: 1100741

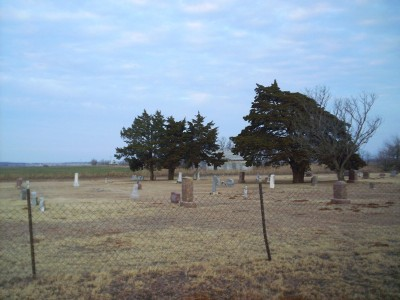
The Pleasant View Cemetery at Pine Ridge has graves from many of the early pioneers of the community.

Pine Ridge is an unincorporated community in Hale Township, Caddo County, Oklahoma, United States. It is located 6 miles (10 km) south of Fort Cobb at the junction of County Road 1380 and County Street 2550.

== History ==
According to locals, the community got its name from the community of Pine Ridge, Arkansas, that was the setting of the radio show Lum and Abner which aired from 1934 to 1952. Legend says that the owner of the grocery store named it "Pine Ridge" after the radio show and over time the name was adopted as the name of the whole community.

During the community's heyday in the 1940s there was a hub of activity at the main junction of the Ozark Trail and the Fort Cobb road, with a grocery store and two churches, Hopewell Missionary Baptist Church and Pine Ridge Church of Christ (founded on May 1, 1949 but later merged into the Fort Cobb Church of Christ.

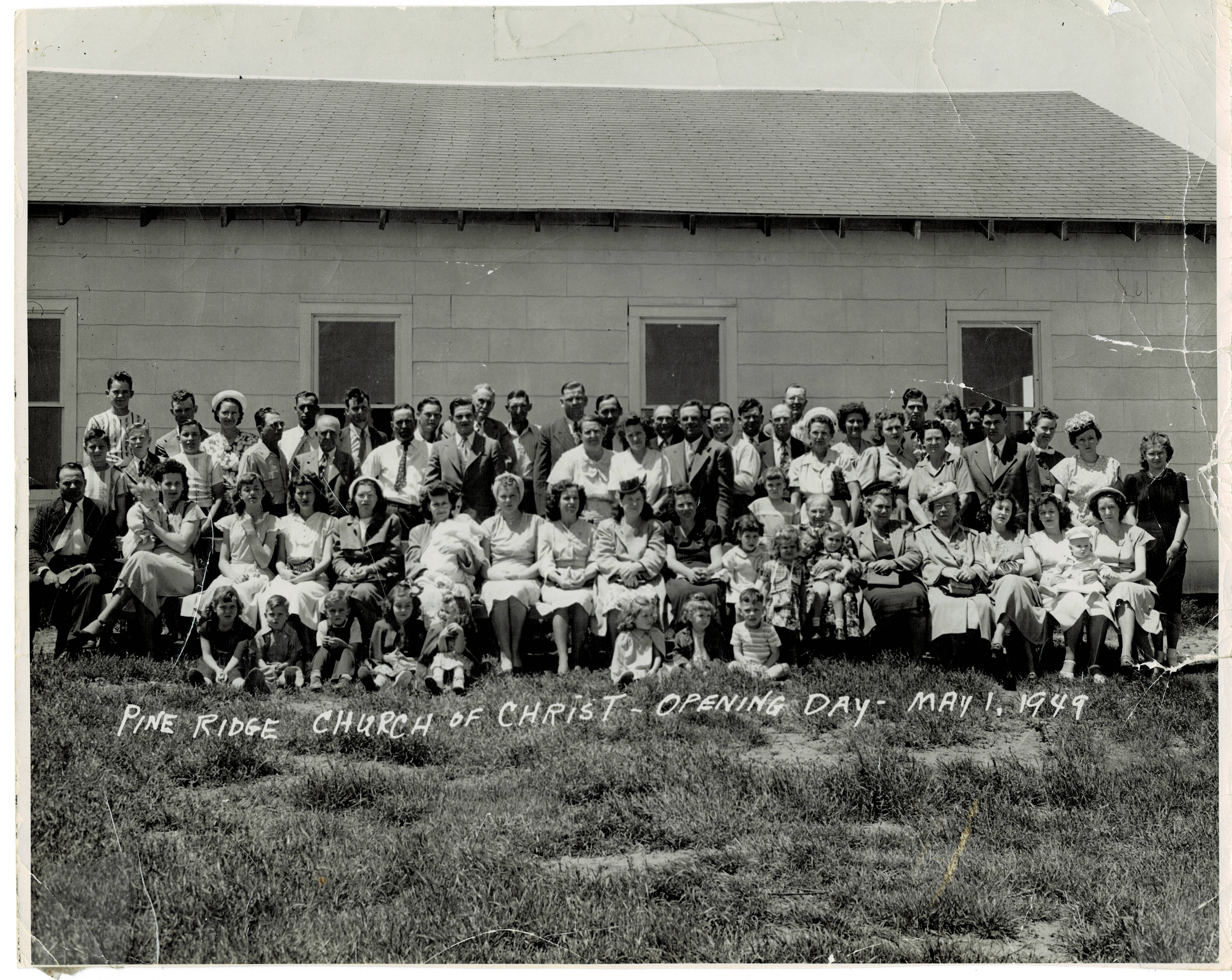
Pine Ridge Church of Christ, opening day May 1, 1949

By the 1950 and 1960's the community went into a time of decline with the grocery store closing and eventually the closing of the churches, sometimes by way of merger with congregations in the neighboring communities of Fort Cobb, Apache and Carnegie. And in at least one case, an entire church building was moved from Pine Ridge to Saddle Mountain, a distance of approximately 25 miles.

By the 1980s, the only visible signs of the community were the Pine Ridge Electrical sub-station, the remains of a church building and the Pleasant Valley Cemetery, but this changed in the late 2010s when the 3 Megawatt Pine Ridge solar generation facility was constructed at the Pine Ridge corner.

In 2022, the Caddo Wind Farm (a 300 Megawatt system) was completed at Pine Ridge, with more than 90 GE-powered wind turbines operating in the Pine Ridge area. Much of the electricity generated by the facility is being purchased by McDonald's, Hormel and OshKosh. According to the power generating company, the site will "avoid more than 697,048 metric tons per year of carbon dioxide emissions that would have been produced if the electricity had been generated using fossil fuels - the equivalent of taking 149,261 cars off the road for a year." According to another source, the site creates enough electricity to power 110,000 households.

== Present ==
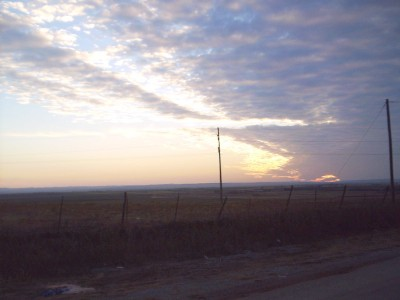
Winter at Pine Ridge

Pine Ridge is located at the junction of the blacktop road going directly south from Fort Cobb and the old Ozark Trail.

The Pine Ridge community mostly consists of land dedicated to wheat and hay farming and cattle ranching, as well as the Pine Ridge solar generation facility. There was also a winery east of Pine Ridge on the Ozark Trail (Woods and Waters Winery and Vineyard) until its closing during the COVID-19 pandemic.

Public school students in Pine Ridge attended school at Broxton until the school district was consolidated with Fort Cobb in the 1990s. Telephone numbers for the Pine Ridge area are split between the Fort Cobb and Apache prefixes. Electric service is provided by CK Energy Electric Cooperative (merged from the former Caddo and Kiwash electric cooperatives in 2016).

Pine Ridge is in State House District 56 and in State Senate District 26.
