= Pine Ridge (Lum and Abner) =

Fictional town

Pine Ridge, Arkansas, was the fictional setting for the radio program Lum and Abner, which ran for 13 weeks every year from 1932 to 1954 on WNBC. It was based on the town of Waters, Arkansas, and some of its residents. Subsequently, the real town of Waters changed its name to Pine Ridge by a vote of the city council, and the community of Pine Ridge, Oklahoma also was named after the fictional town.

Lum Edwards and Abner Peabody were the main characters. The radio show was a comedic look at rural life in the Depression and World War II era. Other characters in the show included Mousey Gray, Cedric Wehunt, and Squire Skimp. In the series, Lum and Abner were the owners of the Jot 'Em Down Store. Some of their misadventures included a failed experiment in creating a bank (first season), getting swindled by a counterfeit money printer (Diogenes Smith – who introduced the phrase "Wonderful World" into the series), and Lum trying himself for a crime he didn't commit (after all, he was simultaneously the town's only prisoner and Justice of the Peace).
