= Mulberry, Surry County, North Carolina =

Unincorporated community in North Carolina, US

Coordinates: 36°19′37″N 80°48′10″W

Mulberry is an unincorporated community in Surry County, North Carolina. The center of the community is roughly the intersection of Mulberry Church Road and Poplar Springs Road. Located on Mulberry Church Road is Mulberry Primitive Church and cemetery, the oldest church in the community and the origin of the community's name.

The community is sometimes referred to as Jot-Um-Down for a former local community store that took this nickname from the Lum and Abner radio show. Landmarks in Mulberry include the Mulberry Primitive Baptist Church and cemetery, Bessie's Chapel church and Jot-Um-Down Volunteer Fire Department. A nineteenth century United States post office, named Venable, stood near here and was named for then area resident and Surry County sheriff, Stephen G. Venable.

== See also ==
- Jot Em Down, Texas
