= Norris Goff =

American comedic actor (1906–1978)

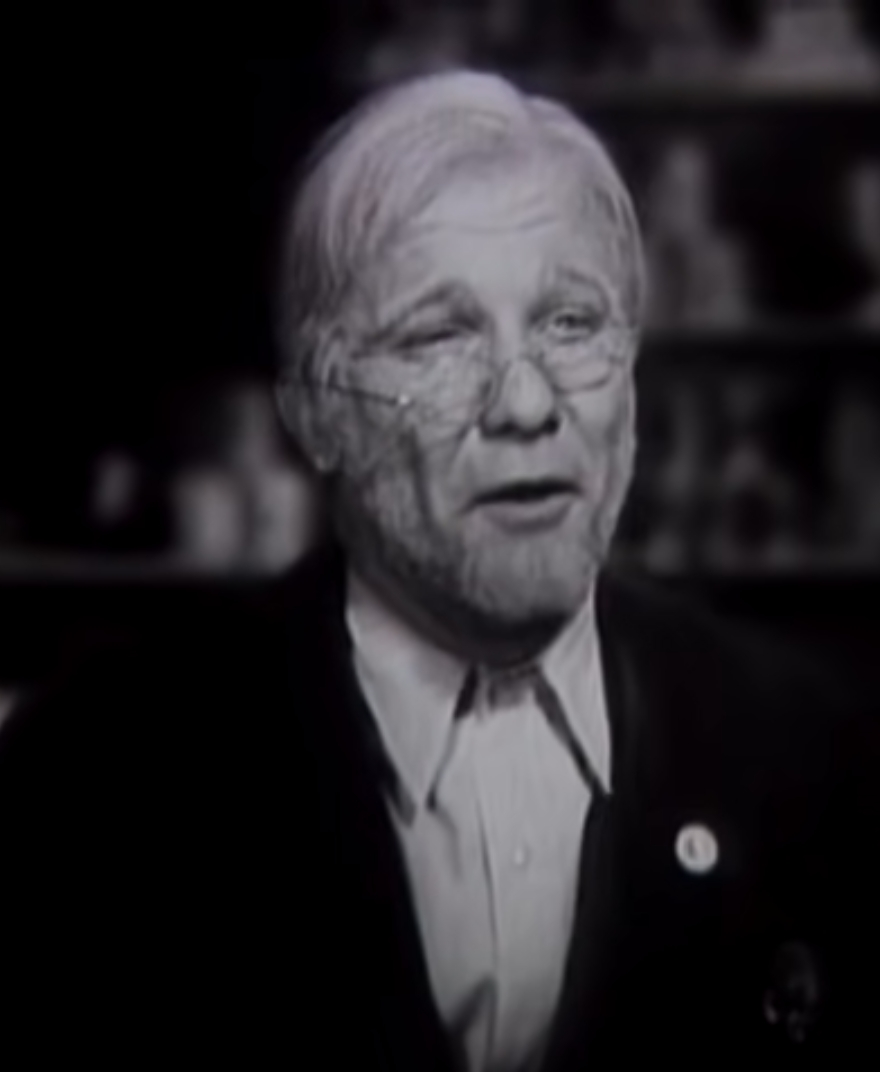
- Goff as Abner in The Bashful Bachelor (1942)
- Born: May 30, 1906; Cove, Arkansas, U.S.
- Died: June 12, 1978 (aged 72); Palm Springs, California, U.S.
- Occupation: Actor
- Years active: 1931–1954

Norris Goff (May 30, 1906 – June 12, 1978) was an American comedian in radio and film best known for his portrayal of Abner Peabody on the rural comedy Lum and Abner.

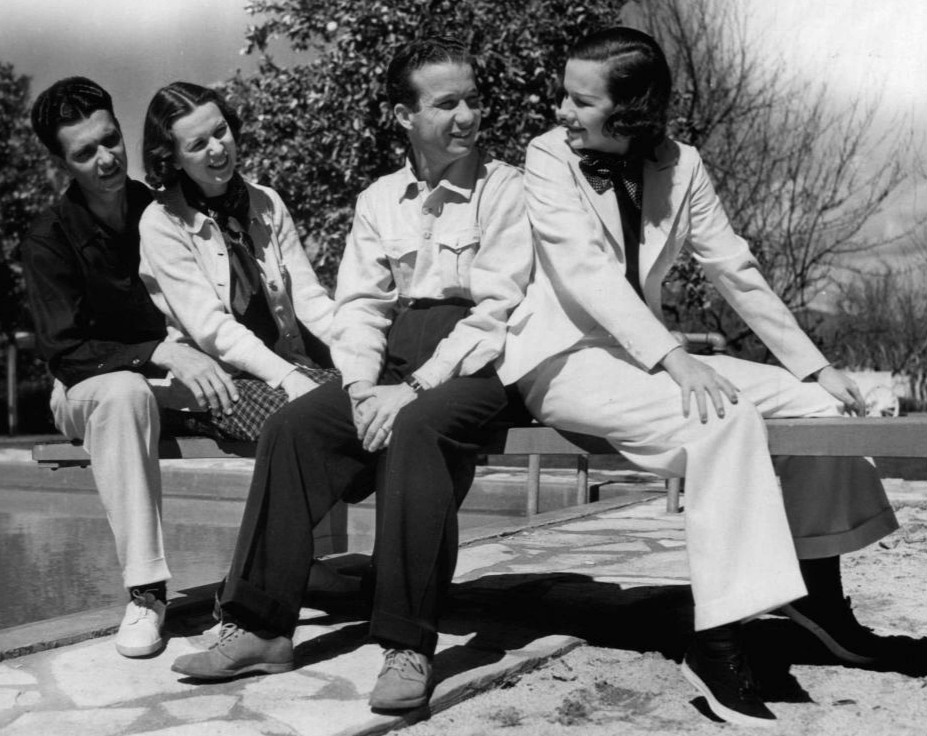
From left: Chester and Mrs. Lauck, Norris and Mrs. Goff in 1941.

== Biography ==
Nicknamed "Tuffy," Goff was born in Cove, Arkansas, but soon moved to Mena, Arkansas where he met his longtime friend and partner Chester Lauck (Lum) and graduating from Mena High School in 1924. Despite their fame as backwoodsmen, both actors graduated from the University of Arkansas, where Goff became a member of the Sigma Chi fraternity.

Goff and his partner had experience as blackface entertainers, but had also worked up a hillbilly skit based on their own life experiences and friends. Performing on local radio, they soon landed their own network series in 1931. In addition to playing the role of the likable but naive, checker-playing Abner (who worked with Lum at the "Jot 'Em down Store" in fictitious Pine Ridge), Goff co-wrote the earliest episodes with Lauck, and played many of the other recurring characters, including postmaster Dick Huddleston (named after a real life friend in Mena), con-man Squire Skimp, Mousy Gray, and in the sentimental annual Christmas show, Doc Miller.

Goff and Lauck also guest starred as Lum and Abner on radio series such as Bing Crosby's Kraft Music Hall; Goff also made a handful of solo appearances, notably guesting as the father of Andy Devine in an episode of The Jack Benny Program. Goff reprised his role as Abner for seven films between 1940 and 1956. Unlike Lauck, who virtually retired outside of playing Lum, Goff continued to make occasional guest appearances on television in the 1960s. Goff appeared in one episode apiece of two situation comedies with rural themes: Gomer Pyle, U.S.M.C. (as Gomer's grandfather) and The Andy Griffith Show (playing a local storekeeper).

Upon retirement he lived in Palm Springs, California. He died of a stroke at the age of 72 in Palm Desert, California.

== Filmography ==
| Year | Title | Role | Notes |
|---|---|---|---|
| 1940 | Dreaming Out Loud | Abner Peabody | |
| 1942 | The Bashful Bachelor | Abner Peabody | |
| 1943 | Two Weeks to Live | Abner Peabody | |
| 1943 | So This Is Washington | Abner Peabody | |
| 1944 | Goin' to Town | Abner Peabody | |
| 1946 | Partners in Time | Abner Peabody | |
| 1956 | Lum and Abner Abroad | Abner Peabody | |
