= List of Sigma Chi members =

This is a list of notable alumni of the Sigma Chi fraternity. Many Sigma Chi members have been awarded the Significant Sig Award by the Sigma Chi headquarters, indicated by a superscript ^{S}.

== Athletics and sports entertainment ==
=== Baseball ===
Name	Original chapter	Notability	Ref.
Bill Buckner^{S}	USC, 1972	MLB – Los Angeles Dodgers (1969–76), Chicago Cubs (1977–84), Boston Red Sox (1984–87 & 1990), Los Angeles Angels (1987–88), Kansas City Royals (1988–89); All-Star (1981); NL Batting Champion (1980)	
Mark DeRosa	University of Pennsylvania, 1997	MLB – Atlanta Braves (1998–2004), Texas Rangers (2005–06), Chicago Cubs (2007–08), Cleveland Indians (2009), St. Louis Cardinals (2009), San Francisco Giants (2010–11), Washington Nationals (2012), Toronto Blue Jays (2013)	
Joe Gordon	Oregon, 1936	2nd baseman 1938–1950 for the New York Yankees and Cleveland Indians; 1942 American League MVP; 5-time World Series Champion; 9-time All-Star; manager of Indians, Tigers, A's and Royals; member of the Baseball Hall of Fame	
Dick Groat^{S}	Duke University, 1953	MLB player, shortstop, Pittsburgh Pirates	
Bob Keegan	Bucknell, 1944	MLB pitcher with the White Sox, threw a no-hitter on August 20, 1957	
Jim Palmer^{S}	Arizona State, 1967	MLB, Baltimore Orioles; Major League Baseball Hall of Famer pitcher	
Nolen Richardson	Georgia, 1926	MLB third baseman with the New York Yankees, Detroit Tigers and Cincinnati Reds; head baseball coach, University of Georgia	
Freddy Sale	Georgia, 1924	MLB pitcher with the Pittsburgh Pirates	
Vernon "Catfish" Smith	Georgia, 1932	College Football Hall of Fame; hHead baseball coach, University of Georgia	
Bobby Valentine^{S}	USC, 1972	Former manager of the Boston Red Sox, former ESPN analyst for Sunday Night Baseball,, Former player in the MLB	
Bill Werber^{S}	Duke University, 1930	MLB, primarily with the Cincinnati Reds, Boston Red Sox, New York Yankees	
Josh Willingham^{S}	University of North Alabama, 1999	MLB player, left fielder, Kansas City Royals	

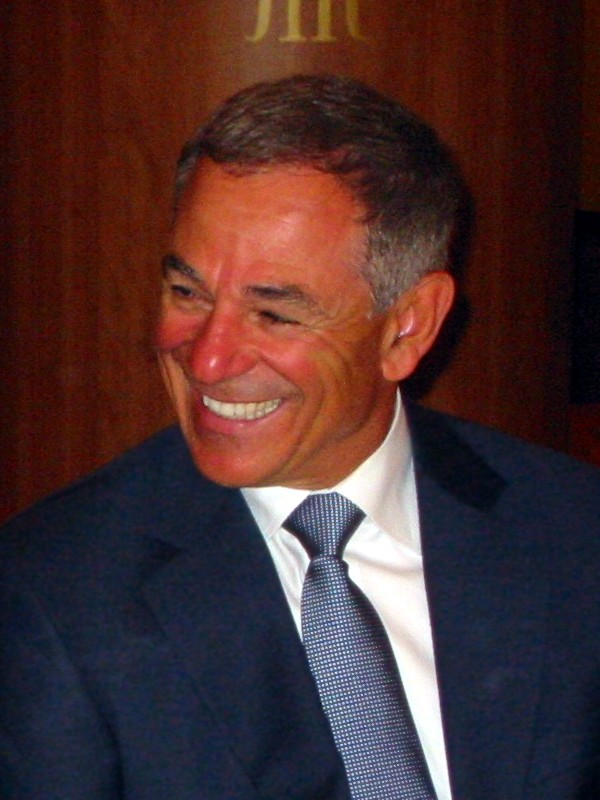
Bobby Valentine

=== Basketball ===
Name	Original chapter	Notability	Ref.
Stan Albeck	Bradley, 1955	Head basketball coach, NBA – Cleveland Cavaliers 1979–80; San Antonio Spurs 1980–83; New Jersey Nets 1983–85; Chicago Bulls 1985–86; NCAA – Bradley Braves 1986–91	
Steve Belko	Idaho, 1939	Head men's basketball coach, Oregon 1956–1971, Idaho State, 1950–1956	
Brad Brownell	DePauw University, 1991	Head men's basketball coach, Clemson University	
Bryan Colangelo^{S}	Cornell University, 1987	President and general manager of the Toronto Raptors	
W.A. Cunningham	Vanderbilt University, 1906	University of Georgia head football coach and head basketball coach 1910–1919	
Ron Greene	Murray State University, 1962	Former head coach at Mississippi State University, Murray State University, Indiana State University; 1978 Southeastern Conference Coach of the Year	
Bob Hill^{S}	BGSU, 1971	Head coach, NBA Seattle SuperSonics, 2006; San Antonio Spurs 1994–1996; Indiana Pacers 1990–1993	
Gavin Maloof^{S}	Chattanooga, 1978	Owner of the Sacramento Kings and Monarchs; owner of Maloof Sports & Entertainment	
Johnny Orr^{S}	Beloit College, 1951	Basketball coach, Michigan and Iowa State	
Eric Piatkowski	University of Nebraska–Lincoln, 1993	Guard/forward, L.A. Clippers, Houston Rockets, Chicago Bulls, Phoenix Suns	
Jack Sikma^{S}	Illinois Wesleyan University, 1976	Center, NBA Seattle SuperSonics (1977–86), NBA Milwaukee Bucks (1986–91); assistant coach, NBA Seattle SuperSonics (2003–07), NBA Houston Rockets (2007–11), NBA Minnesota Timberwolves (2011–14)	
Eddie Sutton^{S}	Oklahoma State, 1958	Oklahoma State basketball coach (retired), Big 12 Coach of the Year	
Jay Wright^{S}	Bucknell, 1983	Former men's basketball coach, Villanova University, 6-time Big East Coach of the Year and 2-time Naismith National Coach of the Year, reached four Final Fours (2009, 2016, 2018, 2022) and won two national championships in 2016 and 2018 with Villanova	

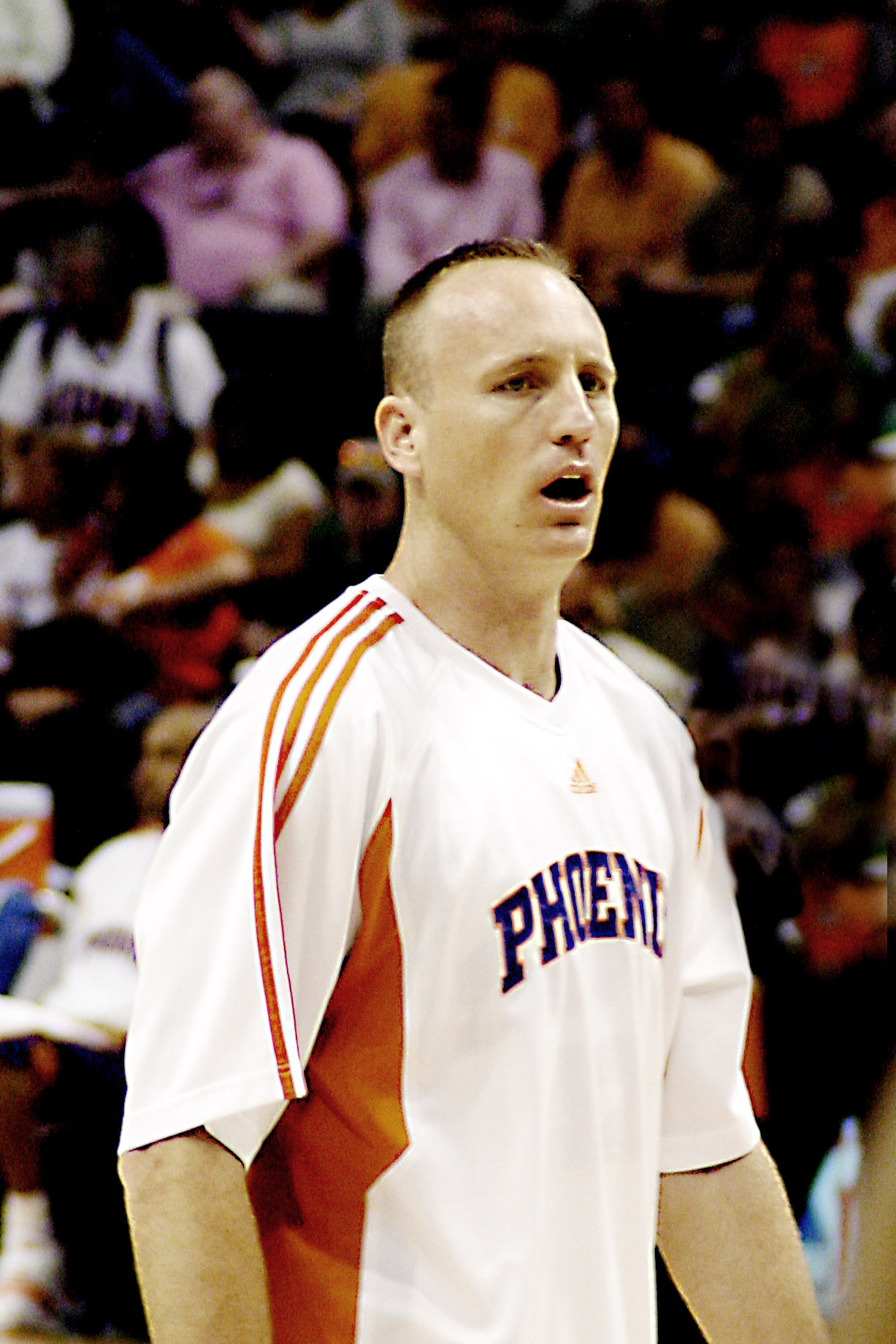
Eric Piatkowski

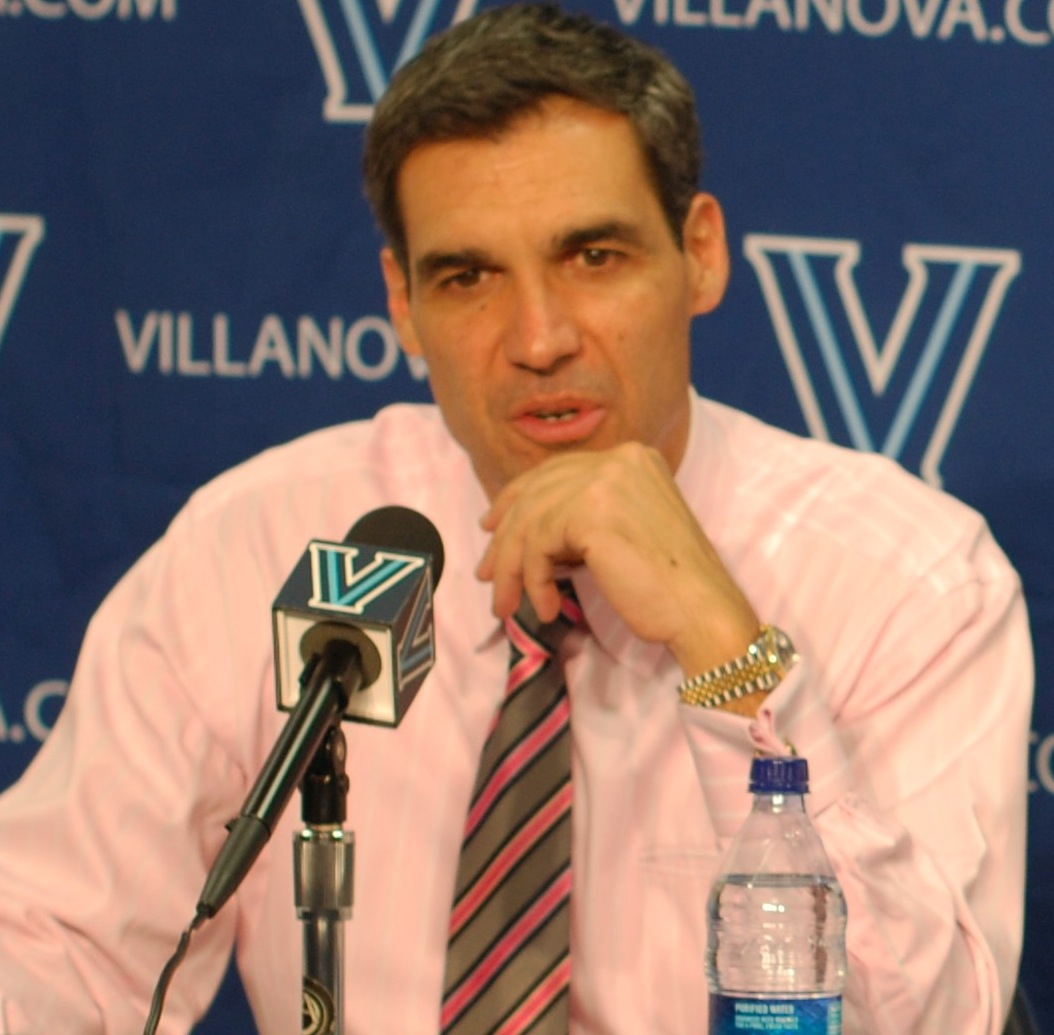
Jay Wright

=== Football ===
Name	Original chapter	Notability	Ref.
Kenneth "Bud" Adams^{S}	University of Kansas, 1944	Owner of Tennessee Titans	
Fred Akers	University of Arkansas	Head coach, University of Texas, 1977–86; head coach, University of Wyoming 1975–76	
Bill Arnsparger^{S}	Miami, 1950	New York Giants head coach, Miami Dolphins defensive coordinator, LSU Tigers head coach, University of Florida athletic director, San Diego Chargers defensive coordinator	
Red Badgro	University of Southern California	End, NFL New York Yankees, 1927–1928, New York Giants, 1930–1935, and Brooklyn Dodgers, 1936	
Matthew Baker	UNC-Chapel Hill, 2006	Quarterback (practice squad), NFL Dallas Cowboys	
Drew Bennett	UCLA, 2001	Wide receiver, NFL St. Louis Rams	
Drew Brees^{S}	Purdue, 2001	Quarterback, New Orleans Saints, 2010 Super Bowl winner & MVP	
Glenn Cadrez	University of Houston 1992	Linebacker, NFL New York Jets, 1992–1995, Denver Broncos, 1995–2000, Kansas City Chiefs, 2001–2002	
Derek Carrier	Beloit College, 2012	NFL tight end for the Oakland Raiders	
Howard "Hopalong" Cassady^{S}	Ohio State University, 1956	Football, running back, 1955 Heisman Trophy recipient, 1956–1961/1963 Detroit Lions, 1962 Cleveland Browns, and 1962 Philadelphia Eagles	
Brad Culpepper	Florida, 1992	Defensive tackle, NFL Minnesota Vikings 1992–	
W.A. Cunningham	Vanderbilt University, 1906	University of Georgia head football coach and head basketball coach 1910–1919	
Brad Daluiso^{S}	UCLA	Placekicker, New York Giants	
Mike Ditka^{S}	Pittsburgh, 1961	Tight end and later head coach, NFL Chicago Bears, Pro Football Hall of Fame, 1988	
Jim Everett^{S}	Purdue, 1986	Former NFL quarterback, Los Angeles Rams, 1986–93; New Orleans Saints, 1994–1996; San Diego Chargers, 1997	
Paul Fersen	Georgia, 1972	NFL offensive tackle, New Orleans Saints	
Jim Finn	University of Pennsylvania 1999	Fullback, NFL New York Giants	
Jeff Graham	Ohio State University, 1988	NFL wide receiver, Green Bay Packers, Cleveland Browns, Washington Redskins, Chicago Bears	
Bob Griese^{S}	Purdue, 1967	Pro Football Hall of Fame quarterback for the Miami Dolphins	
Len Hauss	Georgia, 1964	Washington Redskins 5-time Pro Bowl and 3-time All-Pro center; 70 Greatest Redskins; NFLPA president 1978–1980	
Woody Hayes^{S}	Denison, 1935	NCAA football coach, Ohio State University, 1951–1978; College Football Hall of Fame	
Mark Herrmann^{S}	Purdue, 1980	Quarterback, NFL Denver Broncos, 1982; Baltimore Colts, 1983–1986	
Mike Holmgren^{S}	USC, 1970	President of the Cleveland Browns; former coach of the Seattle Seahawks and Green Bay Packers	
Brad Hoover	Western Carolina University, 2000	Fullback, NFL Carolina Panthers	
Don Hutson^{S}	Alabama, 1935	Green Bay Packers, Pro Football Hall of Fame	
Kliff Kingsbury^{S}	Texas Tech, 2002	Quarterback, Texas Tech, 1998–2002, offensive coordinator, Texas A&M 2012; coach, Texas Tech University, 2013–present	
Johnny Majors^{S}	Tennessee, 1957	Football coach, Iowa State, 1968–1972; Pittsburgh, 1973–1976; Tennessee, 1977–1992; College Football Hall of Fame, 1987	
Bob McNair^{S}	University of South Carolina, 1958	Owner of NFL Houston Texans	
Urban Meyer^{S}	Cincinnati, 1986	Head football coach, Ohio State University, University at Florida; 2006, 2008, 2014 National Championship coach	
Harold "Brick" Muller^{S}	University of California, Berkeley, 1922	First player in Western United States to earn All-American honors (1921, 1922), Rose Bowl MVP (1921), silver medalist in high jump as member of track and field team representing the US in the 1920 Summer Olympics, College Football Hall of Fame (1951), Breitbard Hall of Fame	
Bronko Nagurski^{S}	Minnesota, 1930	Fullback and defensive tackle, NFL Chicago Bears, 1930–1937, 1943; Pro Football Hall of Fame charter member, 1963	
Merlin Olsen^{S}	Utah State, 1962	Defensive tackle, Los Angeles Rams, Pro Football Hall of Fame	
Ryan Pace^{S}	Eastern Illinois, 1999	General manager, NFL Chicago Bears, 2015–present	
Sean Payton^{S}	Eastern Illinois, 1987	Head coach, NFL New Orleans Saints, 2006–present; quarterback, AFL Chicago Bruisers, 1987	
John Pont^{S}	Miami, 1952	Head football coach, Miami University, Yale University, Indiana University, Northwestern University	
Larry Rakestraw	Georgia, 1964	Quarterback, NFL Chicago Bears, 1966–68	
John Robinson^{S}	Oregon, 1958	Head coach, NFL Los Angeles Rams; NCAA football USC Trojans, 1976–1982	
Lou Saban^{S}	Indiana University, 1944	Head coach, NFL Denver Broncos, 1967–1971; Buffalo Bills, 1972–1976	
Clark Shaughnessy	Minnesota, 1914	Head coach, Tulane University, 1915–1920, 1922–1926, Loyola University New Orleans, 1927–1932, University of Chicago, 1933–1939, Stanford University, 1940–1941, University of Maryland, 1942, 1946, University of Pittsburgh, 1943–1945, NFL Los Angeles Rams 1944–1949, University of Hawaiʻi 1965; College Football Hall of Fame, 1968	
Phillippi Sparks^{S}	Arizona State, 1991	Defensive back, New York Giants and Dallas Cowboys, National Football League	
Hank Stram^{S}	Purdue, 1945	Head coach, NFL Kansas City Chiefs, 1963–1974; Pro Football Hall of Fame, 2003	
T. J. Yates	University of North Carolina, 2011	NFL quarterback for the Atlanta Falcons	
Fielding H. Yost^{S}	West Virginia, 1897	Head coach, University of Michigan, 1901–1923, 1925–1926; College Football Hall of Fame, 1951	
Ed White^{S}	University of California, Berkeley, 1969	NFL Minnesota Vikings (1969–1977), San Diego Chargers (1978–1985), Consensus All-American (1969), 4x Pro Bowl (1975–77, 1979), College Football Hall of Fame, University of California Hall of Fame, Pac-12 All Century Team, Breitbard Hall of Fame, East-West Shrine Game Hall of Fame, 50 Greatest Minnesota Vikings, San Diego Chargers Hall of Fame	

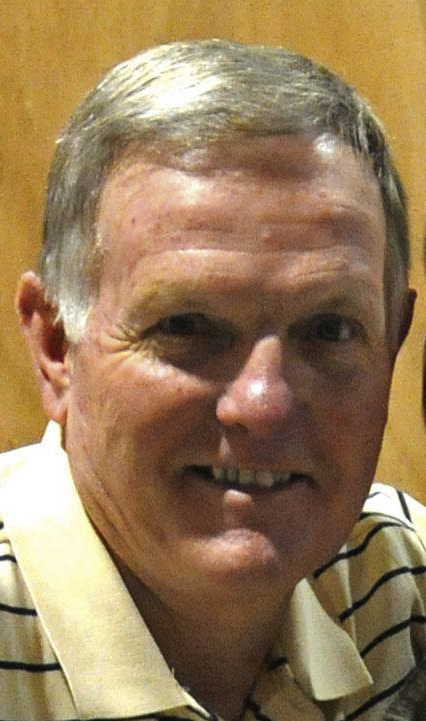
Bob Griese

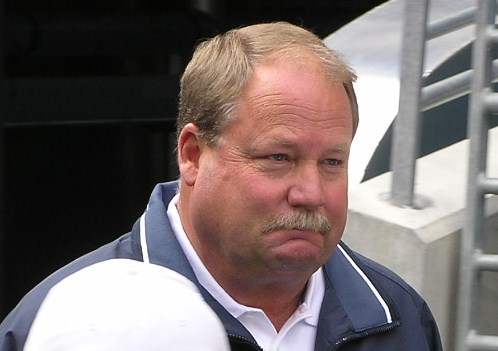
Mike Holmgren

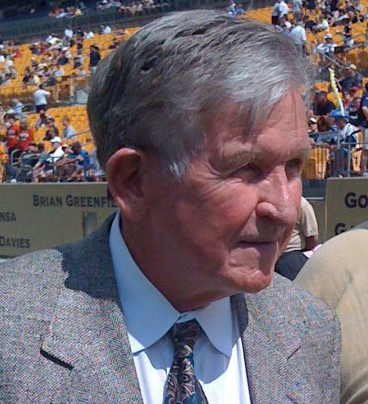
Johnny Majors

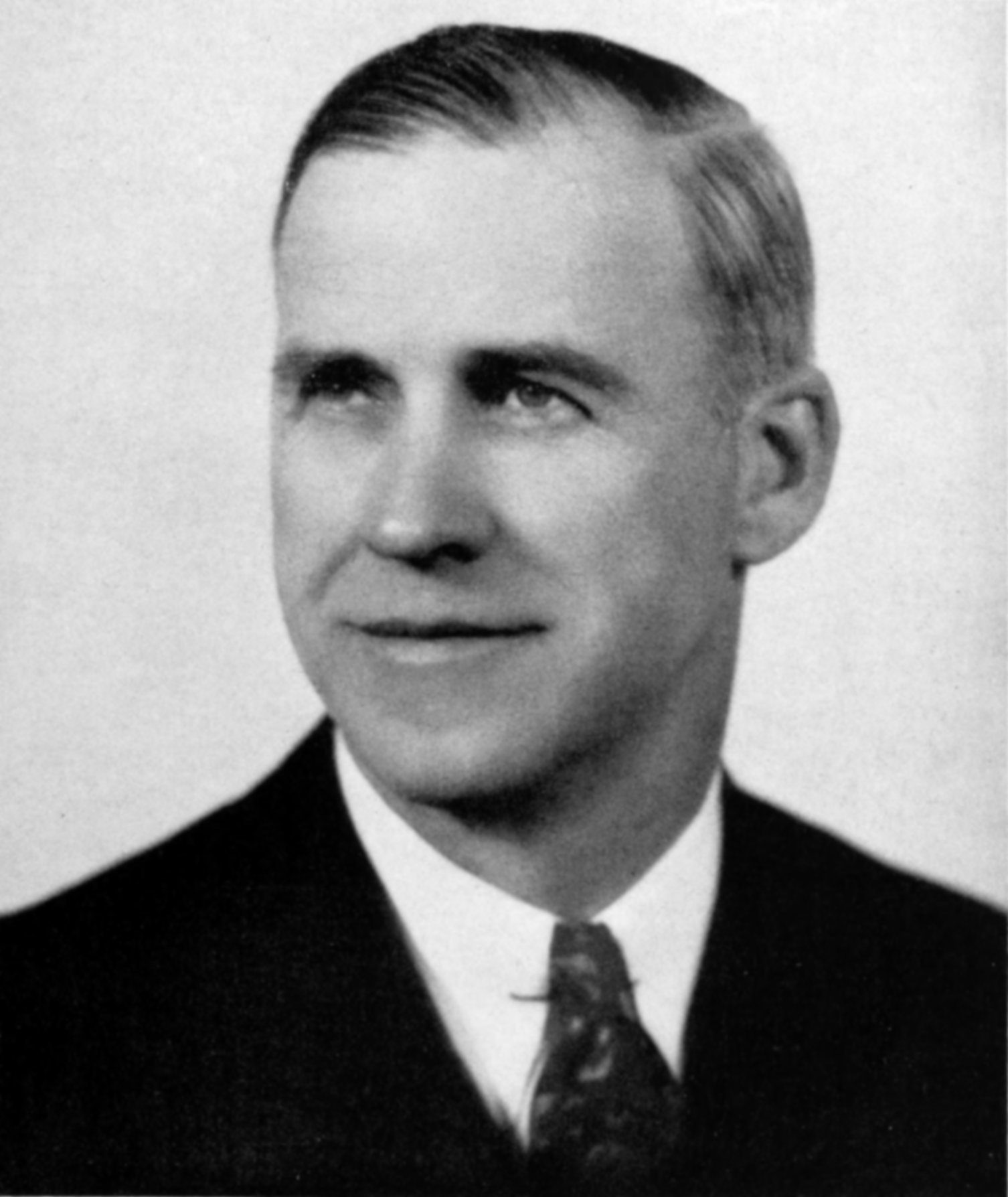
Clark Shaughnessy

=== Golf ===
Name	Original chapter	Notability	Ref.
Notah Begay III	Stanford, 1995	Professional golfer, PGA Tour	
Luke Donald^{S}	Northwestern, 2001	Professional golfer, PGA Tour	
William H. Lane	Tennessee, 1947	Chairman of Augusta National Golf Club and Masters Tournament	
Casey Martin	Stanford, 1995	Current head coach of the Oregon's golf team and former professional golfer, PGA Tour, plaintiff, PGA Tour, Inc. v. Casey Martin, 2001	
Bo Van Pelt^{S}	Oklahoma State, 1998	Professional golfer, PGA Tour	

=== Other ===
Name	Original chapter	Notability	Ref.
Dwight "Dike" Eddleman	Illinois, 1949	Silver medalist, high jump, 1948 Olympics; NBA All-Star; generally considered the University of Illinois's greatest athlete	
Eric Fonoimoana^{S}	UCSB, 1993	Gold medalist, men's beach volleyball, 2000 Olympics	
Jeff Gorton	Bridgewater MA, 1990	Hockey, Montreal Canadiens, executive vice president of hockey operations	
T. J. Middleton	Georgia, 1990	Tennis professional; 1994 Wimbledon mixed doubles finalist; 2004 Over 35 Wimbledon doubles champion	
Billy Packer	Wake Forest, 1962	CBS Sports sportscaster	
Reid Patterson	Georgia, 1954	1956 Melbourne Olympic Games swimmer; former 50 meter freestyle world record holder and 200 meter freestyle relay world record holder	
W.O. Payne	Georgia, 1900	Athletic director at the University of Georgia 1936–1943; Payne Hall on the Georgia campus is named in his honor	
Tony Trabert^{S}	University of Cincinnati, 1952	Tennis champion, International Tennis Hall of Fame member	
Carl F. Ullrich^{S}	Cornell University, 1950	Athletic director at West Point 1980–1990, executive director of the Patriot League 1989–1993	
Darrin Van Horn	University of Kentucky, 1990	Professional boxer, 1989 IBF Junior Middleweight Champion, 1991 IBF Super Middleweight Champion	
O'Neill Williams	Emory, 1965	Professional fisherman and outdoor personality; host of TV's O'Neill Outside on Sun Sports, SportSouth and Versus channels	

== Business and technology ==
Name	Original chapter	Notability	Ref.
Roy Chapman Andrews^{S}	Beloit College, 1906	Explorer, adventurer naturalist, director of the American Museum of Natural History	
Philip Anschutz^{S}	University of Kansas, 1961	Entrepreneur, Anschutz Entertainment Group	
Jim Barksdale	Mississippi, 1965	CEO of Netscape, 1995–99	
Reggie Bradford	Georgia, 1990	Former CMO of WebMD and former president of Tandberg Television; founder of ViTrue, Inc.	
George W. Bryan	Mississippi State University, 1965	Senior vice president of Sara Lee Corporation, CEO of Sara Lee Foods, and founder of Old Waverly Golf Club	
Alex d'Arbeloff^{S}	Massachusetts Institute of Technology 1949	Co-founder, Teradyne	
David Dillon	Kansas, 1973	CEO of Kroger	
T. Coleman du Pont	MIT, 1885	Former president, DuPont Chemical	
Andy Dunn^{S}	Northwestern, 2000	CEO of Bonobos	
Keith Ferrazzi^{S}	Yale, 1986	Business consultant and author	
William "Bill" George	Georgia Tech, 1964	CEO, Medtronic 1991–2001, board member of Goldman Sachs, Novartis, ExxonMobil	
Gordon Gould^{S}	Union College, 1941	One of the primary inventors of the laser; National Inventors Hall of Fame	
Michael Graves^{S}	Cincinnati, 1958	Award-winning post-modern architect	
Toxey Haas^{S}	Mississippi State University, 1978	Founder and CEO, Haas Outdoors, Inc. (Mossy Oak)	
Harvey Hancock	University of Utah, 1925	Aviation executive; Northern California campaign manager for two successful races by Richard Nixon: 1950 United States Senate, and 1952 presidential campaign, under Dwight D. Eisenhower	
James Haslam Jr.^{S}	Tennessee	Founder and owner of Pilot Travel Centers	
E.W. "Ed" Kelley^{S}	Indiana University, 1939	Founder, Kelley & Partners Ltd; chairman, Steak 'n Shake; namesake of Kelley School of Business (Indiana University)	
Dara Khosrowshahi^{S}	Brown University, 1991	Businessman, CEO of Uber, CEO of Expedia	
Keith J. Krach^{S}	Purdue University, 1979	U.S. under secretary of state, chairman/CEO of DocuSign and Ariba; chairman of Purdue University Board of Trustees; 64th grand consul of Sigma Chi	
Kenneth Langone^{S}	Bucknell University, 1957	Co-founder of Home Depot; New York University's Medical Center is named after him and his wife	
J. Michael Luttig^{S}	Washington and Lee University, 1976	Executive vice president, general counsel, and on board of directors for Boeing	
Doug Manchester	San Diego State University	San Diego real estate developer, owner of the San Diego Union Tribune	
E.W. Marland^{S}	Michigan, 1893	Founder of the Marland Oil Company	
J. Willard Marriott, Jr.^{S}	University of Utah, 1954	President of Marriott International	
John S. McMillin	DePauw University	Lawyer, businessman, and political figure; served as Sigma Chi's first grand consul	
Ron W. Miller^{S}	University of Southern California, 1977	CEO of The Walt Disney Company	
Robert Montgomery	University of Alabama, 1952	Lawyer known for winning large settlements against the tobacco industry	
Thomas F. Olin^{S}	University of Michigan, 1952	Chairman and co-chief executive officer, Archway Cookies, Inc.	
Edward "Ted" Rogers^{S}	University of Toronto, 1956	Former president and CEO of Rogers Communications Inc.	
Ed Seykota	MIT, 1969	Self-made money manager and investor	
Matthew Simmons	Utah, 1965	Founder and chairman emeritus of Simmons & Company International; author of Twilight in the Desert; energy adviser to George W. Bush	
Bob Swanson^{S}	MIT, 1969	Co-founder of Genentech	
C. Bruce Tarter	MIT, 1961	Former director of Lawrence Livermore National Laboratory	
Dr. Gerard van Belle^{S}	Whitman College, 1990	Noted astrophysicist at Lowell Observatory, the European Southern Observatory, and Jet Propulsion Laboratory/Caltech	
Charles Watson^{S}	Oklahoma State University, 1972	Founder, former CEO, Dynegy	

== Education ==
Name	Original chapter	Notability	Ref.
Gregory H. Adamian^{S}	Wesleyan, 1948	Former president and chancellor of Bentley University	
David B. Ashley^{S}	MIT, 1973	President of the University of Nevada, Las Vegas	
John Gabbert Bowman^{S}	University of Iowa, 1899	Chancellor of the University of Pittsburgh 1921–1945; the Cathedral of Learning, the second tallest educational building in the world, is dedicated to him	
Joel Cunningham^{S}	Chattanooga, 1965	Vice chancellor and president of the University of the South 2000–2010	
Constantine William Curris^{S}	University of Kentucky, 1962	President of Murray State University 1973–1983 and University of Northern Iowa 1983–1995	
George H. Denny	University of Virginia, 1896	15th president of the University of Alabama; Bryant–Denny Stadium and the Denny Chimes are named in his honor	
Lamar Dodd^{S}	Georgia Tech, 1930	Head of Art Department at University of Georgia; Lamar Dodd School of Art named in his memory at the University of Georgia	
Carl H. Eigenmann	Indiana University, 1886	Professor and ichthyologist; many species of fish are named in his honor	
Rufus Fitzgerald^{S}	University of Tennessee-Knoxville, 1919	Chancellor of the University of Pittsburgh 1945–1955; the Fitzgerald Field House is named in his honor	
Tomlinson Fort, Jr.	Georgia, 1952	Head of Chemical Engineering, Carnegie-Mellon and Vanderbilt University; provost and vice president of Cal Poly	
John Howard Harris	Bucknell University, 1869	President of Bucknell University 1889–1919, longest presidential term in the University's history; Harris Hall on campus is named in his honor	
Cecil C. Humphreys^{S}	University of Tennessee-Knoxville, 1936	President of Memphis State University 1960–1972	
Mark E. Keenum^{S}	Mississippi State, 1984	President of Mississippi State University, 2009–present	
James R. Killian^{S}	MIT 1925	10th president of MIT, special assistant for science and technology to President Dwight D. Eisenhower, 1957–1959	
Robert Lindgren^{S}	University of Florida, 1976	President of Randolph-Macon College	
Bernie Machen^{S}	Vanderbilt University, 1966	Eleventh president of the University of Florida (2003–present); former president of the University of Utah (1997–2003)	
William Andrew MacKay^{S}	Dalhousie University, 1950	Former president of Dalhousie University	
Robert D. McTeer^{S}	Georgia, 1964	Chancellor of the Texas A&M University System	
William C. Powers	University of California, Berkeley, 1968	President of the University of Texas at Austin 2006–2015	
J. Wayne Reitz^{S}	Colorado State, 1930	Fifth president of the University of Florida (1955–1967)	
Robert H. Shaffer^{S}	Depauw University, 1936	Pioneer in the field of student affairs	
Elvis Jacob Stahr, Jr.^{S}	University of Kentucky, 1936	Dean of College of Law at Kentucky, 1948–1957; president of West Virginia University 1959–1961; secretary of the Army 1961–1962; president of Indiana University, 1962–68	
Charles Hyde Warren	Yale University	Professor and dean at Yale University	

== Entertainment ==
=== Actors ===
Name	Original chapter	Notability	Ref.
Warren Beatty^{S}	Northwestern University, 1959	Film actor, Academy Award winner, Golden Globe winner, BAFTA winner	
Clancy Brown^{S}	Northwestern University, 1981	Film actor, The Shawshank Redemption, Highlander; voice of Mr. Krabs	
Ty Burrell	Oregon, 1987	Film actor, film director, television actor, Modern Family	
David Canary^{S}	University of Cincinnati, 1960	Television actor, All My Children	
Jim Caviezel^{S}	University of Washington, 1990	Actor, film The Passion of the Christ, TV series Person of Interest	
William Christopher^{S}	Wesleyan University, 1958	Television actor, M*A*S*H	
Charles Cioffi^{S}	Michigan State University, 1971	Movie and television actor, Shaft	
Eric Close	University of Southern California, 1989	Television actor, Without a Trace	
Buster Crabbe^{S}	University of Southern California, 1931	Actor, Buck Rogers, Flash Gordon; Olympic swimmer	
Brian Dennehy^{S}	Columbia University, 1960	Tony Award-winning actor	
Evan Farmer	Tulane University, 1995	Host, While You Were Out	
Clarence Gilyard^{S}	California State University, Long Beach, 1981	Film actor, Top Gun; television actor, Walker, Texas Ranger	
Tony Hale^{S}	Samford University, 1992	Actor, Arrested Development, Veep	
Woody Harrelson^{S}	Hanover College, 1983	Academy Award-twice nominated, Emmy-nominated actor	
Archie Kao	George Mason University, 1996	Film actor	
Pat Kilbane	Beloit College, 1990	Comedic actor	
Chester Lauck^{S}	University of Arkansas, 1926	Radio comedy, Lum and Abner	
David Letterman^{S}	Ball State University, 1969	Television personality, host, The Late Show with David Letterman	
Peter Lupus^{S}	Butler University, 1954	Television actor, Mission: Impossible	
Neal McDonough	Syracuse University, 1988	Film Actor, 88 Minutes, The Guardian	
Ted McGinley^{S}	University of Southern California, 1981	Film & television actor, Married... with Children, Hope & Faith	
Burr McIntosh^{S}	Lafayette, 1884	Silent film actor, supporting actor	
Patrick Muldoon	University of Southern California, 1991	Actor, Melrose Place, Starship Troopers	
Fred Newman	Georgia, 1974	Actor, voice actor and composer; Men in Black, Harry and the Hendersons, Gremlins, Grand Theft Auto 2	
Lee Norris	Wake Forest University, 2004	Actor, One Tree Hill	
Brad Pitt^{S}	University of Missouri, 1982	Film actor	
Ben Savage	Stanford University, 2004	Television actor, Boy Meets World	
Sonny Seiler^{S}	Georgia, 1954	Film actor, Midnight in the Garden of Good and Evil, The Legend of Bagger Vance; owner of University of Georgia mascot Uga	
Tom Selleck^{S}	University of Southern California, 1967	Television actor, Magnum, P.I.	
Jay Stewart	Butler, 1939	Television game show announcer, Let's Make a Deal, Deal of the Century	
Regis Toomey^{S}	Pittsburgh, 1921	Film actor, Meet John Doe, The Big Sleep	
Rip Torn^{S}	University of Texas, 1952	Film and television actor, Men in Black, The Larry Sanders Show	
John Wayne^{S}	University of Southern California, 1929	Film actor	
Don Wilson^{S}	University of Colorado at Boulder, 1923	Announcer, The Jack Benny Program	

=== Film and television production ===
Name	Original chapter	Notability	Ref.
Stephen J. Cannell^{S}	University of Oregon, 1964	Emmy-winning television producer	
Ethan Drogin^{S}	Harvard University, 1998	Television producer and writer	
Kerry McCluggage^{S}	University of Southern California, 1976	Sigma Chi Board of Governors, president of Paramount Television, founder of UPN Network	
Tom Shadyac^{S}	University of Virginia, 1981	Movie Director of films Ace Ventura: Pet Detective, The Nutty Professor, Liar Liar, Bruce Almighty, and I Am	
Mark Tinker^{S}	Syracuse University, 1973	Television producer and director, St. Elsewhere, NYPD Blue	

=== Music ===
Name	Original chapter	Notability	Ref.
Wade Bowen	Texas Tech University	Texas country singer and songwriter	
Luke Bryan^{S}	Georgia Southern University	Country musician and songwriter	
Tom Collins^{S}	University of Tennessee	Country music producer, Country Music Association board chairman	
Brett James	Baylor University	Grammy Award-winning songwriter	
Bobby Ogdin^{S}	University of Tennessee	Member of Elvis Presley's TCB Band, recording session pianist for major artists	
Cole Swindell^{S}	Georgia Southern University	Country artist, songwriter, and performer	
Drew Taggart^{S}	Syracuse University	One-half of the multi-platinum and Grammy-nominated The Chainsmokers	
Michael Utley^{S}	University of Arkansas	Musician and songwriter, founding member of Jimmy Buffett's Coral Reefer Band	

=== News ===
Name	Original chapter	Notability	Ref.
Bret Baier^{S}	DePauw University, 1992	Anchor, Special Report with Bret Baier, Fox News Channel	
Greg Gutfeld	University of California, Berkeley, 1987	Host of Red Eye w/ Greg Gutfeld on the Fox News Channel	
David Hartman^{S}	Duke University, 1956	Actor, former host, Good Morning America	
Lewis Craig Humphrey	Centre College, 1896	Editor of Louisville Evening Post and Louisville Herald-Post	
John McWethy	DePauw University, 1969	Emmy-winning correspondent, ABC news	
Clayton Morris	University of Pittsburgh, 1999	Host, Fox & Friends on Fox News Channel	
Andy Rooney	Colgate University, 1942	Television personality and essayist, 60 Minutes	
Bob Trumpy^{S}	University of Utah, 1967	Color commentator, NBC Sports; tight end, National Football League Cincinnati Bengals, 1968–1977	
Steve Weissman	Northwestern University, 2001	Host, SportsCenter on ESPN	

=== Radio ===
Name	Original chapter	Notability	Ref.
Keith Bilbrey^{S}	Tennessee Tech, 1974	Announcer on the Grand Ole Opry, WSM (AM) radio DJ, WSMV-TV	
Dave Fogel^{S}	University of Missouri, 1982	Radio DJ	
Norris Goff^{S}	University of Oklahoma, 1928	Radio comedy, Lum and Abner	

== Legal ==
Name	Original chapter	Notability	Ref.
Earl Anzai	Emory University, 2008	Attorney general of Hawaii (1999–2002)	
William Barker^{S}	Chattanooga, 1964	Chief justice, Tennessee Supreme Court, 1995–2009	
Michael Bryant^{S}	University of British Columbia, 1987	Attorney general of Ontario 2003–2007, MPP	
Randy Crane	University of Texas, 1985	Youngest ever United States district judge for the Southern District of Texas 2002–present	
Jose Alejandro Gonzalez, Jr.	University of Florida, 1952	Justice, United States District Court for the Southern District of Florida 1978–1996	
Mark Herring	University of Virginia, 1983	Attorney general of Virginia, 2014–present	
Wayne Kidwell	University of Idaho, 1960	Justice, Idaho Supreme Court 1999–2005, attorney general of Idaho 1975–1979	
J. Michael Luttig^{S}	Washington and Lee University, 1976	Former Federal Judge on the United States Court of Appeals for the Fourth Circuit, 1991–2006	
Frank Murphy^{S}	Michigan, 1912	United States attorney general, 1939–1940; associate justice of the Supreme Court of the United States, 1940–1949	
Hardy Myers	University of Mississippi, 1961	Attorney general of Oregon 1996–2008	
William O'Kelley^{S}	Emory University, 1951	Senior judge, United States District Court 1970–present	
Matthew Olsen	University of Virginia, 1984	Prosecutor and director of the National Counterterrorism Center (NCTC), 2011–2014	
James C. Paine^{S}	University of Florida, 1952	Justice, United States District Court for the Southern District of Florida 1979–1992	
William Rogers^{S}	Colgate University, 1934	United States attorney general, 1957–1961	
Bolon B. Turner^{S}	University of Arkansas, 1922	Judge of the United States Tax Court, 1934–1962; later national president of Sigma Chi, 1963–1967	
David Viviano^{S}	Hillsdale College, 1994	Justice, Michigan Supreme Court, 2013–present	
Robert Wefald^{S}	University of North Dakota, 1964	Attorney general of North Dakota 1981–1984	
James D. Whittemore^{S}	University of Florida, 1974	Justice, United States District Court for the Middle District of Florida, Tampa Division, 2000–present	

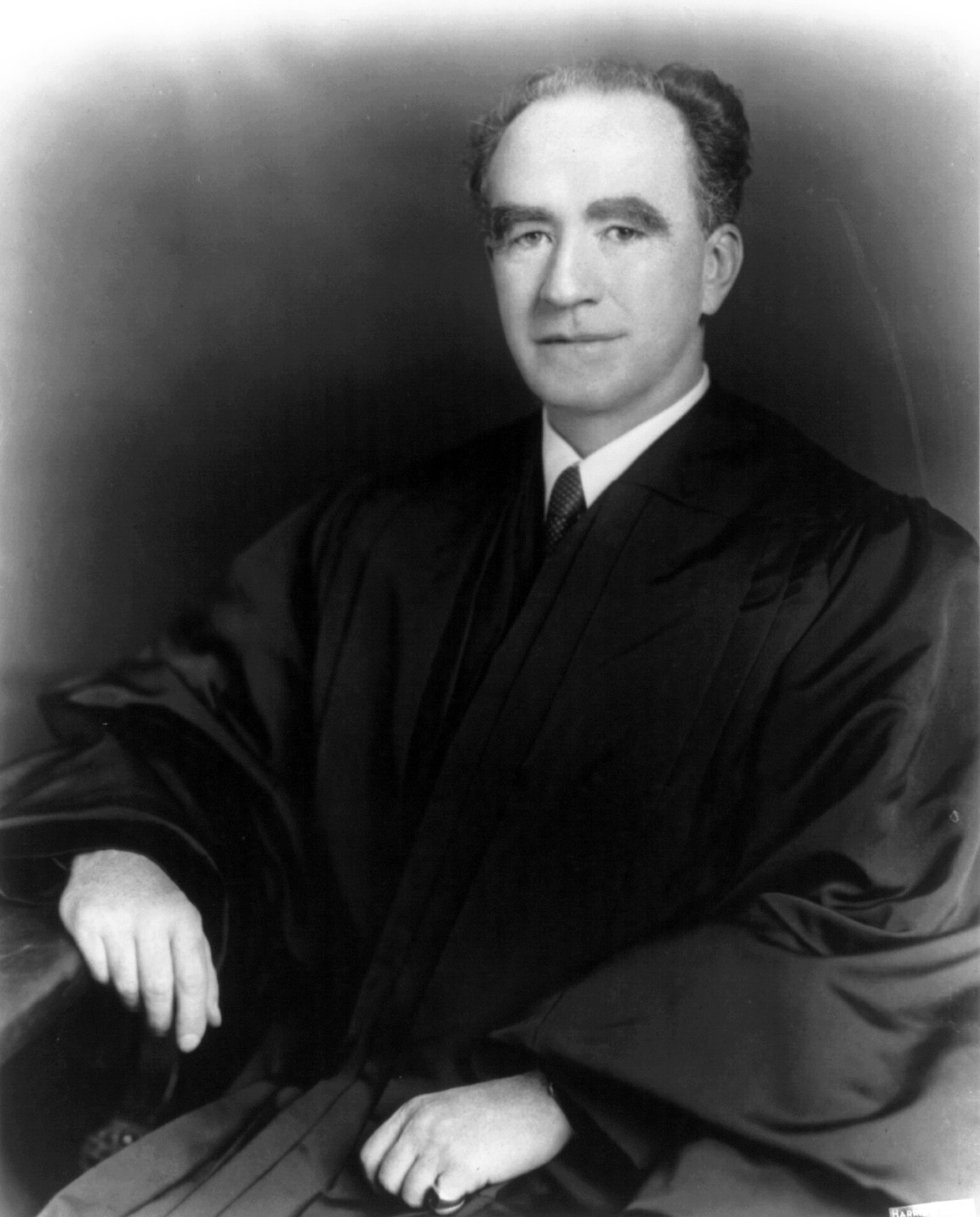
Frank Murphy

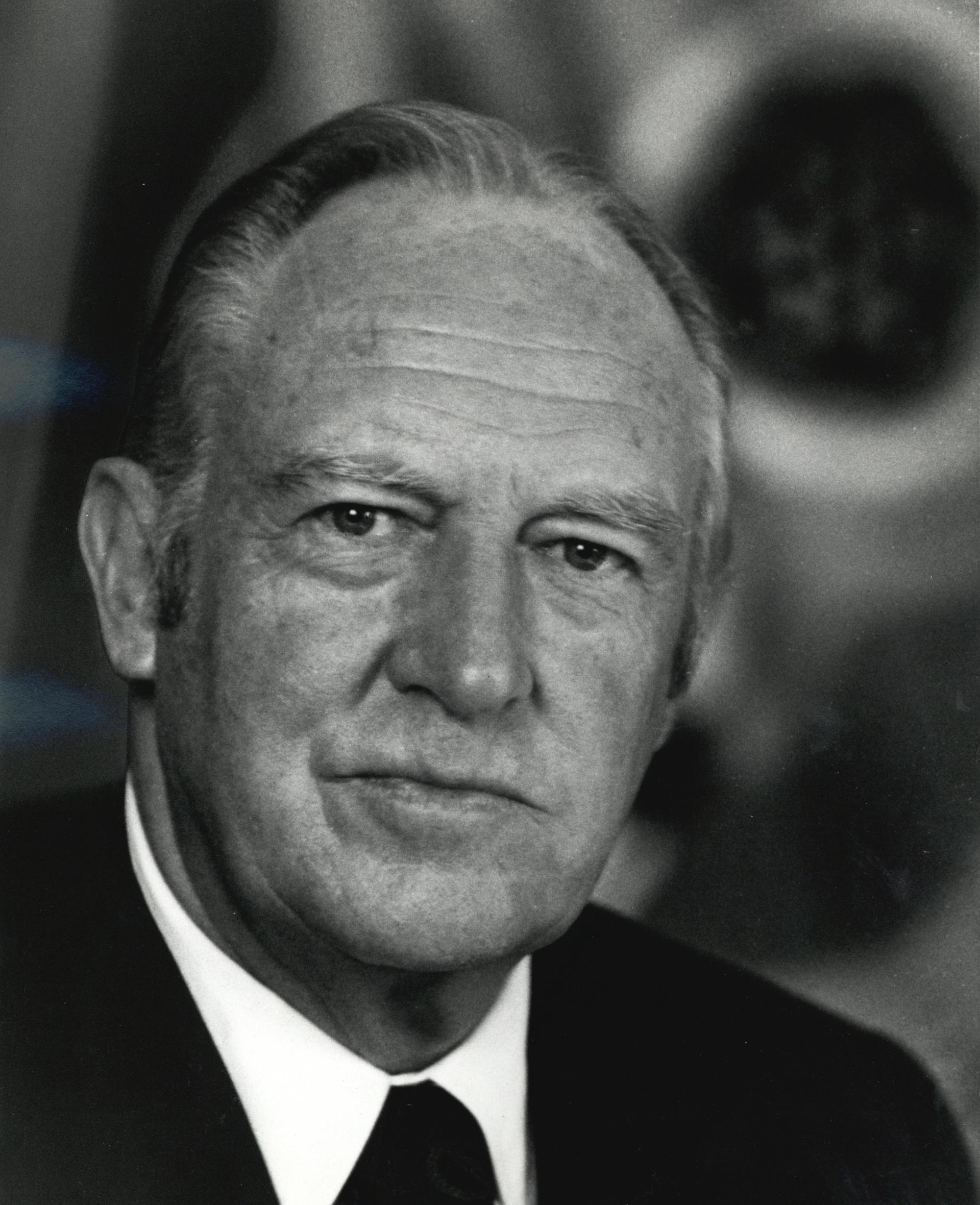
William Rogers

== Medicine ==
Name	Original chapter	Notability	Ref.
Alfred Blalock	Georgia, 1919	Noted research surgeon at Vanderbilt University and Johns Hopkins and developer of the Blalock-Taussig Shunt; his work on blue baby syndrome was documented in the 2004 movie Something the Lord Made	
Joshua Butler	Texas State University Texas, 2002	Director of Audioprothology	
William DeVries^{S}	MD, University of Utah, 1966	Cardiothoracic surgeon, performed first successful artificial heart implant surgery on Barney Clark, 1982	
Merrill Moore	Vanderbilt University, 1924	Psychiatrist and poet; neurologist at the Harvard Medical School	
Kary Mullis	Georgia Institute of Technology, 1964	Won the 1993 Nobel Prize in Chemistry for his development of the polymerase chain reaction (PCR), a central technique in biochemistry and molecular biology which allows the amplification of specified DNA sequences	
Russell M. Nelson	University of Utah, 1945	Cardiothoracic surgeon, performed the first open heart surgery west of the Mississippi, current president of the Church of Jesus Christ of Latter Day Saints	
Jerry A. Shields	Murray State University, 1960	Ophthalmologist	

== Military ==
Name	Original chapter	Notability	Ref.
Colonel Charles A. Beckwith	Georgia, 1952	Credited with creating Delta Force	
Captain Maurice Britt^{S}	Arkansas, 1941	Recipient of the Medal of Honor	
General John K. Cannon, USAF	University of Utah, 1914	Commanding general of USAFE; namesake of Cannon Air Force Base	
Brigadier General Robert Cardenas^{S}	New Mexico, 1955	Inductee of the National Aviation Hall of Fame for his role as the pilot on the mothership B-29 bomber and operations officer on the X-1 program	
Colonel William Eckhardt	University of Mississippi, 1963	Chief prosecutor in the My Lai cases	
Lieutenant General Paul E. Funk^{S}	Montana State University, 1961	Father of General Paul E. Funk II, commanding general of III Corps; commanding general of the US Army Armor Center and Fort Knox; commanding general of the 3d Armored Division during the Persian Gulf War; commanding general of National Training Center and Fort Irwin; assistant division commander of the 9th Infantry Division; brigade commander of the 194th Separate Armored Brigade; and battalion commander of 5th Battalion, 33rd Armor Regiment	
General Paul E. Funk II^{S}	Montana State University, 1984	Commanding general of TRADOC; commanding general of III Corps; commanding general of the 1st Infantry Division; brigade commander of 1st Brigade, 1st Cavalry Division; and battalion commander of 1st Squadron, 7th Cavalry Regiment	
Major General Patrick J. Hurley^{S}	George Washington University, 1913		
Colonel James R. Lockett	Georgia, 1874	Charter member of the Delta Chapter; Camp Lockett was named in his honor	
General Merrill A. McPeak^{S}	San Diego State University, 1957	Former USAF chief of staff	
Major General Michael Myatt	Sam Houston State University 1961	Commanding general of the 1st Marine Division during the Persian Gulf War; former president of the Marines' Memorial Club	
Captain Robert Prince	Stanford University, 1941	Known for leading the Raid at Cabanatuan as portrayed by James Franco in The Great Raid	
General Victor E. "Gene" Renuart, USAF	Indiana 1971	Former commander of United States Northern Command	
Lt. Gen. Keller E. Rockey^{S}	Gettysburg College, 1909	Commanded the Fifth Marine Division in the Battle of Iwo Jima	
Secretary of the Air Force Russell A. Rourke^{S}	University of Maryland, 1953	Former U.S. secretary of the Air Force	
Major General Benjamin Piatt Runkle	Miami University, 1857	Sigma Chi founder and Civil War commander	
Technical Sergeant Forrest L. Vosler^{S}	Syracuse University, 1948	Recipient of the Medal of Honor	

== Nonprofits ==
Name	Original chapter	Notability	Ref.
Stewart McLaurin	University of Alabama	President of the White House Historical Association	
Hector A. "Tico" Perez^{S}	University of Central Florida	National commissioner of the Boy Scouts of America	

== Politics and government ==
Those with careers spanning multiple categories are usually included with their highest or most prestigious office.

=== Presidents of the United States ===
Name / Original chapter / Notability / Ref.; Grover Cleveland / Honorary brother at University of Michigan, 1893 / President of the United States, 1885–1889, 1893–1897

=== United States cabinet and White House staff ===
Name	Original chapter	Notability	Ref.
Jim Brady^{S}	Illinois, 1962	White House press secretary, 1981–1989 during the Reagan administration	
Johnny DeStefano	Saint Louis University, 2001	Assistant to the president and counselor to the president, 2018, during the Trump administration	
Stanley K. Hathaway^{S}	University of Wyoming, 1946	U.S. secretary of the interior, 1975 during the Ford administration	
Patrick J. Hurley^{S}	George Washington University, 1913	U.S. secretary of war 1929–1933 during the Hoover administration	
Cody Keenan^{S}	Northwestern University, 2002	Director of speech writing, 2013–2017 during the Obama administration	
Bert Lance	Georgia, 1952	Director, United States Office of Management and Budget, 1977 during the Carter administration	
Thomas F. McLarty III^{S}	Arkansas, 1969	White House chief of staff, 1993–1994 during the Clinton administration	
Thomas Perez	Brown University, 1983	Secretary of the United States Department of Labor 2013–2017	
William P. Rogers^{S}	Colgate University, 1934	U.S. secretary of state, 1969–1973 during the Nixon administration	
Charles G. Ross	Missouri, 1905	White House press secretary, 1945–1950 during the Truman administration	

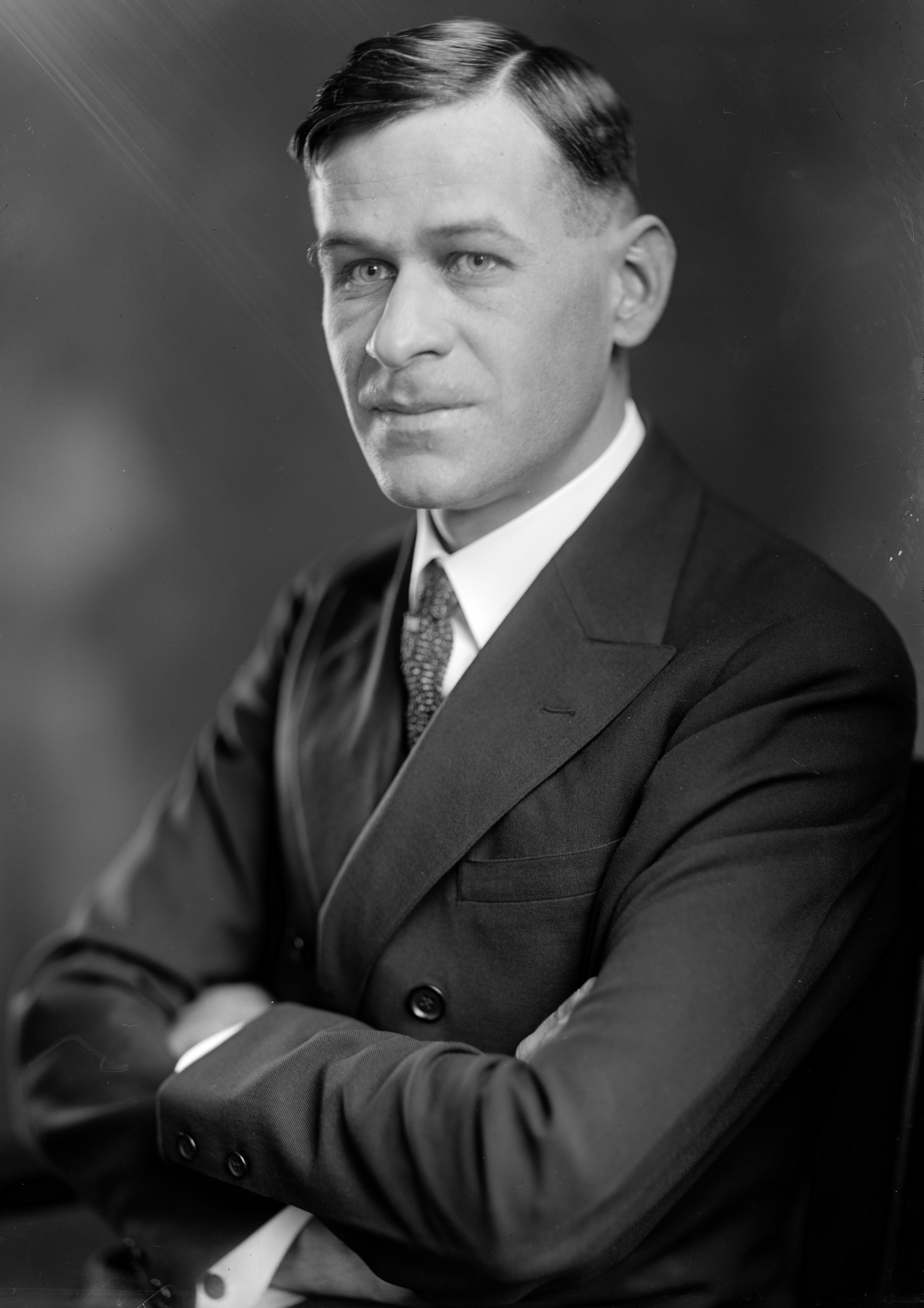
Charles Ross

=== United States Senate ===
Name	Original chapter	Notability	Ref.
James Abdnor	University of Nebraska, 1945	U.S. senator for South Dakota 1981–1987	
Lamar Alexander^{S}	Vanderbilt, 1962	U.S. senator for Tennessee 2002–2021	
Mark Andrews^{S}	North Dakota State University, 1949	U.S. senator for North Dakota 1981–1987	
C. Saxby Chambliss^{S}	Georgia, 1966	U.S. senator for Georgia 2003–2015	
Bob Corker^{S}	University of Tennessee, Knoxville, 1974	U.S. senator for Tennessee 2007–2019	
Thomas du Pont	MIT, 1885	U.S. senator for Delaware 1921–1922, 1925–1928	
John Ensign^{S}	UNLV, 1980	U.S. senator for Nevada 2001–2011	
Michael Enzi^{S}	George Washington, 1966	U.S. senator for Wyoming 1996–2021	
J. William Fulbright^{S}	University of Arkansas, 1924	U.S. senator for Arkansas 1945–1974	
Ruben Gallego^{S}	Harvard, 2004	U.S. senator from Arizona 2025–present; former U.S. representative for Arizona 2015–2025	
Jake Garn^{S}	University of Utah, 1954	U.S. senator for Utah 1974–1993	
Barry Goldwater^{S}	University of Arizona, 1932	U.S. senator for Arizona 1953–1965, 1969–1987	
William Langer	University of North Dakota, 1905	U.S. senator for North Dakota 1933–1934, 1937–1939	
Herman Welker	University of Idaho, 1925	U.S. senator for Idaho 1951–1957	

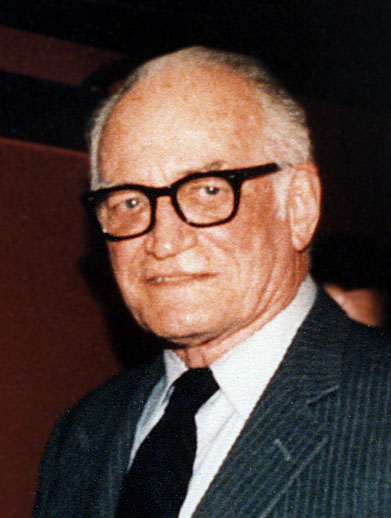
Barry Goldwater

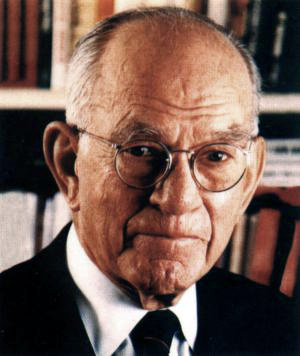
J. William Fulbright

=== United States House of Representatives ===
Name	Original chapter	Notability	Ref.
James Abdnor	University of Nebraska, 1945	U.S. representative for South Dakota 1973–1981	
Mark Andrews^{S}	North Dakota State University, 1949	U.S. representative for North Dakota 1963–1981	
Kelly Armstrong^{S}	University of North Dakota, 2001	U.S. representative for North Dakota 2019–present	
Dan Bishop	University of North Carolina at Chapel Hill, 1986	U.S. representative for North Carolina 2019–present	
Tim Burchett^{S}	University of Tennessee, 1985	U.S. representative for Tennessee 2019–present	
Sam Farr	Willamette University, 1963	U.S. representative for California 1993–2017	
John Garamendi^{S}	University of California, Berkeley, 1966	U.S. representative for California 2009–present	
Jim Gerlach^{S}	Dickinson, 1980	U.S. representative for Pennsylvania 2003–2015	
Barry Goldwater, Jr.^{S}	Arizona, 1962	U.S. representative for California 1969–1983	
Garret Graves^{S}	University of Alabama, 1991	U.S. representative for Louisiana 2015–present	
Brooks Hays^{S}	George Washington, 1922	U.S. representative for Arkansas 1943–1959	
Van Hilleary	University of Tennessee, Knoxville, 1981	U.S. representative for Tennessee 1995–2003	
Steny Hoyer^{S}	University of Maryland, 1963	U.S. representative for Maryland 1981–present, majority leader 2019–2021, minority leader 2021–present	
Henry Hyde^{S}	Duke University, 1946	U.S. representative for Illinois 1975–2007	
Isaac M. Jordan	Miami University, 1857	Sigma Chi founder and U.S. representative for Ohio 1883–1885	
Henderson Lovelace Lanham	Georgia, 1910	U.S. representative for Georgia 1947–1957	
E.W. Marland^{S}	Michigan, 1893	U.S. representative for Oklahoma 1933–1935	
Mark Meadows^{S}	University of South Florida, 1981	U.S. Representative for North Carolina 2013–2020	
George M. O'Brien	Northwestern University, 1938	U.S. representative for Illinois 1973–1986	
Steven Palazzo^{S}	University of Southern Mississippi	U.S. representative for Mississippi 2011–present	
Jerry M. Patterson	University of Arizona, 1956	U.S. representative for California 1975–1985	
Dean Phillips^{S}	Brown University, 1991	U.S. representative for Minnesota 2019–present	
Chip Pickering^{S}	Mississippi, 1986	U.S. representative for Mississippi 1997–2009	
B. Carroll Reece^{S}	Chattanooga, 1910	U.S. representative for Tennessee 1921–1931	
Todd Rokita^{S}	Wabash College, 1992	U.S. representative for Indiana 2011–2018; secretary of state of Indiana, 2002–2010	
Bill Shuster^{S}	Dickinson College, 1983	U.S. representative for Pennsylvania 2001–2018	
E.G. "Bud" Shuster^{S}	University of Pittsburgh, 1954	U.S. representative for Pennsylvania 1972–2001	
Ike Skelton^{S}	University of Missouri, 1953	U.S. representative for Missouri 1977–2011	
Thomas Spight	Mississippi, 1861	U.S. representative for Mississippi 1898–1911	
Mo Udall^{S}	University of Arizona, 1949	U.S. representative for Arizona 1961–1991	
Roger Williams	Texas Christian University, 1971	U.S. representative for Texas 2013–present	

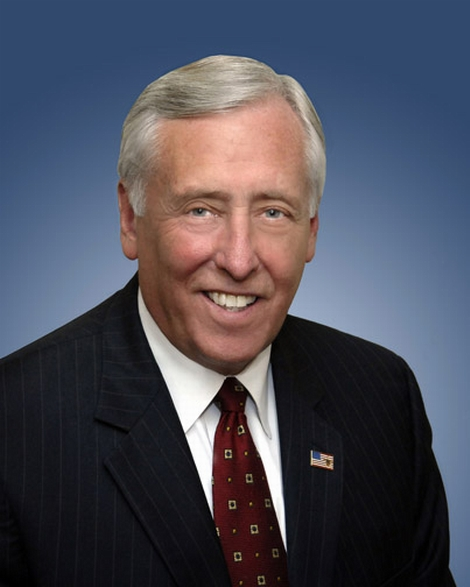
Steny Hoyer

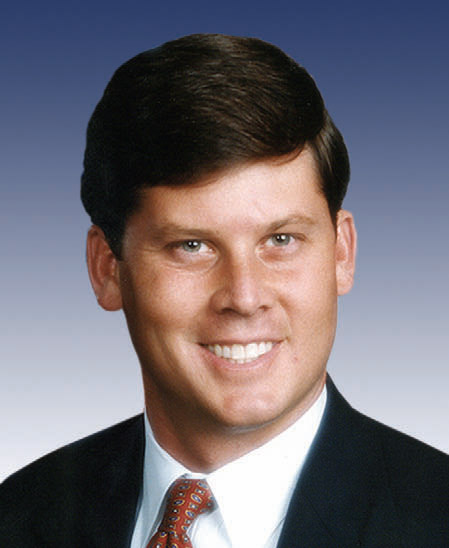
Chip Pickering

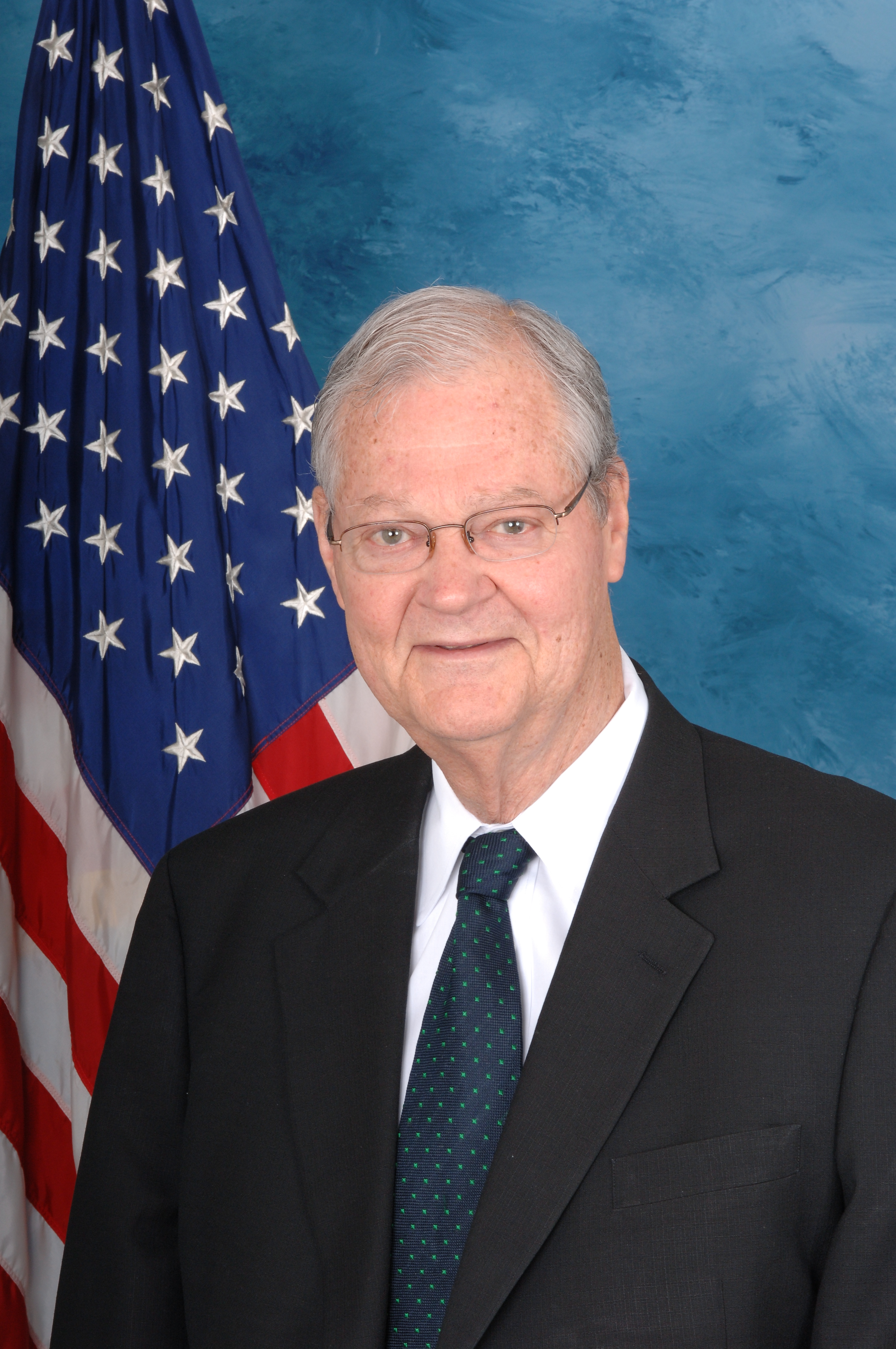
Ike Skelton

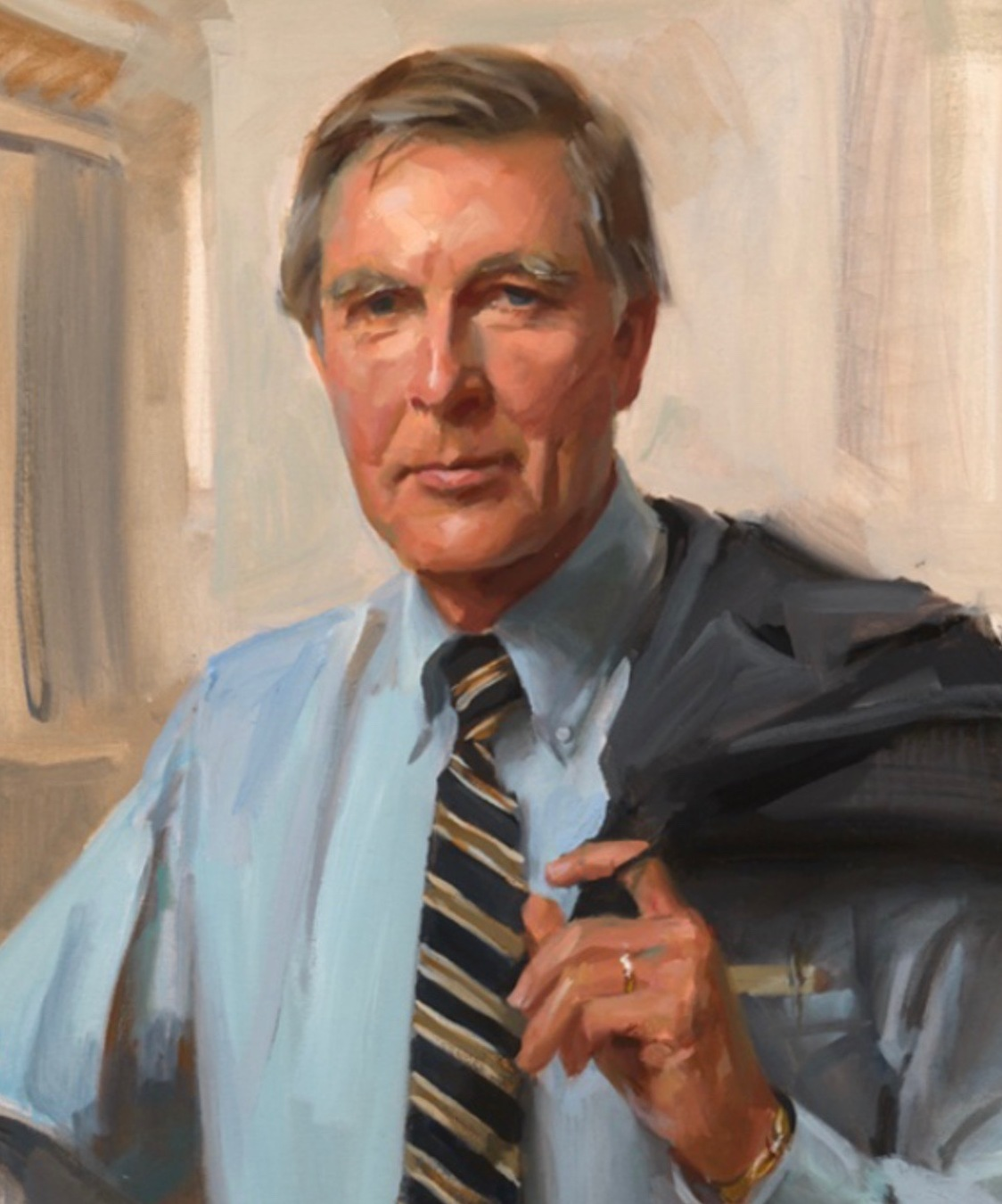
Mo Udall

=== Governors and lieutenant governors of U.S. states ===
Name	Original chapter	Notability	Ref.
Lamar Alexander^{S}	Vanderbilt, 1962	Governor of Tennessee 1979–1987	
Andy Beshear	Vanderbilt, 2002	Governor of Kentucky 2019–present	
John Bohlinger^{S}	Montana, 1959	Lieutenant governor of Montana 2005–2013	
Maurice Britt^{S}	University of Arkansas, 1941	Lieutenant governor of Arkansas	
Garland T. Byrd	Georgia, 1949	Lieutenant governor of Georgia 1959–1963	
Jay Dardenne^{S}	LSU, 1976	Lieutenant governor of Louisiana 2010–2016	
Kirk Fordice^{S}	Purdue, 1956	Governor of Mississippi 1992–2000	
John Garamendi^{S}	University of California, Berkeley, 1966	Lieutenant governor of California 2007–2009	
Bill Haslam^{S}	Emory, 1980	Governor of Tennessee 2011–2019	
Stanley K. Hathaway^{S}	University of Wyoming, 1946	Governor of Wyoming 1967–1975	
Jon Huntsman, Jr.^{S}	University of Pennsylvania, 1987	Governor of Utah 2005–2009	
E.W. Marland^{S}	Michigan, 1893	Governor of Oklahoma 1935–1939	
Frank Murphy^{S}	Michigan, 1912	Governor of Michigan 1937–1939	
Chase Osborn^{S}	Purdue University	Governor of Michigan 1911–1913	

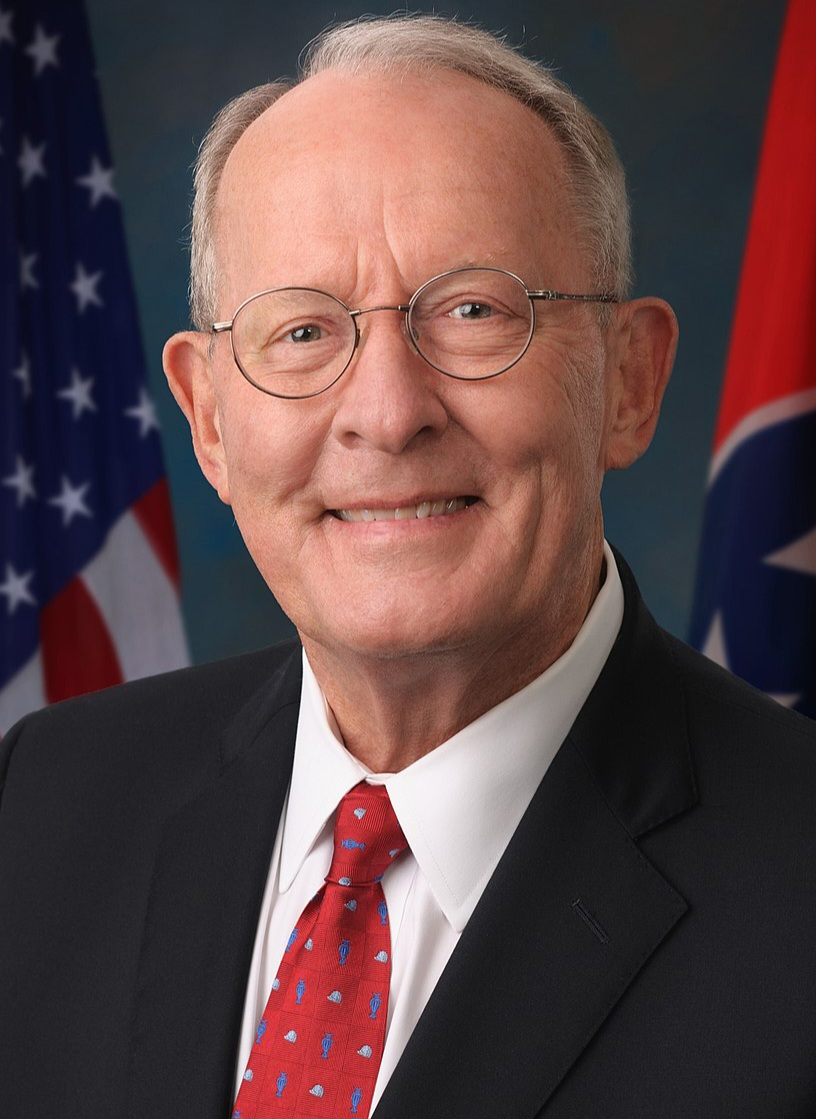
Lamar Alexander

=== Other U.S. state offices ===
Name	Original chapter	Notability	Ref.
Bob Babbage	Eastern Kentucky University, 1973	Kentucky secretary of state and Kentucky auditor of public accounts	
Ward R. Bliss	Bucknell University, 1874	Pennsylvania state representative 1889–1905	
Jerry Gaetz	University of Oklahoma, 1973	North Dakota state senator in 1964	
Mark Herring	University of Virginia, 1983	Attorney general of Virginia 2014–present	
Bruce Jacob^{S}	Florida State University, 1957	Florida assistant attorney general, 1960–1962	
John C. Land III^{S}	University of South Carolina, 1966	South Carolina Senate, 36th District 1976–present; Senate Democratic minority leader 2000–present	
Roy Earl Parrish	West Virginia University, 1908	West Virginia state senator 1915–1918	
Thomas J. Philips	Bucknell University	Pennsylvania state representative	

=== Ambassadors ===
Name	Original chapter	Notability	Ref.
John Alan Beesley^{S}	University of British Columbia, 1950	Canadian ambassador to Austria, International Atomic Energy Agency, United Nations Industrial Development Organization, United Nations in Geneva and General Agreement on Tariffs and Trade	
William Tapley Bennett Jr.^{S}	Georgia, 1937	U.S. ambassador to the Dominican Republic, Portugal, and NATO	
Edward Gnehm^{S}	George Washington University, 1966	U.S. ambassador to Kuwait 1991–1994, Australia 2000–2001, and Jordan 2001–2004	
Jon Huntsman, Jr.^{S}	University of Pennsylvania, 1987	U.S. ambassador to China 2009–2011, U.S. ambassador to Russia 2017–present	
Patrick J. Hurley^{S}	George Washington University, 1913	U.S. ambassador to China 1944–1945	
Ken Taylor	University of Toronto	Canadian ambassador to Iran; helped six Americans escape from Iran during the hostage crisis during a covert rescue known as the Canadian Caper	

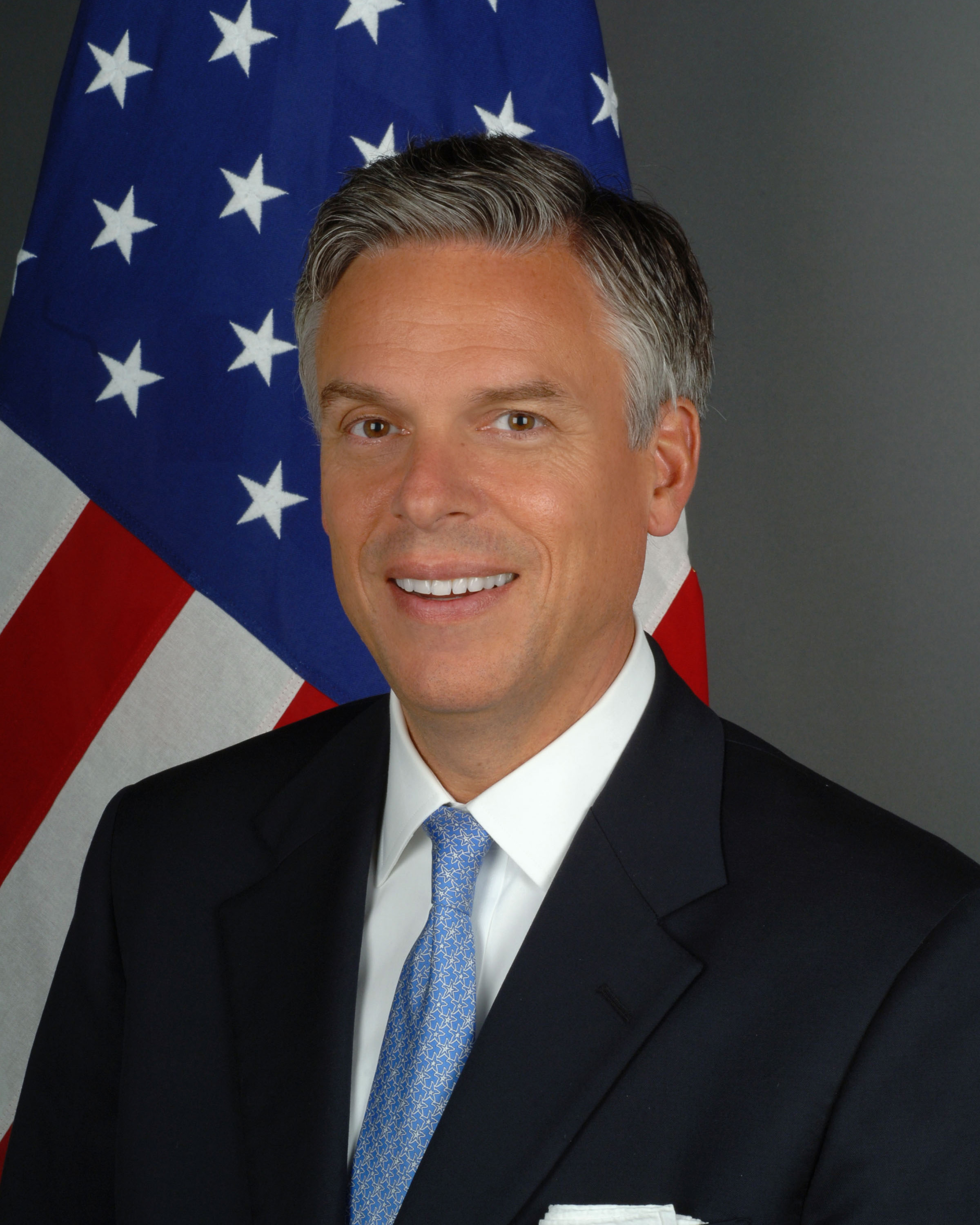
Jon Huntsman, Jr.

=== Canadian politics ===
Name	Original chapter	Notability	Ref.
Hon. Alexander Bradshaw Campbell	Dalhousie University, 1955	Premier of Prince Edward Island	
Hon. Richard Bennett Hatfield	Dalhousie University, 1956	Premier of New Brunswick	
Hon. Jack Layton	McGill University, 1969	Leader of the New Democratic Party and leader of the Official Opposition	
Stephen Lecce	University of Western Ontario, 2008	Member of Provincial Parliament, Parliamentary assistant to the premier of Ontario, Ontario minister of education	
Hon. Stewart Donald McInnes	Dalhousie University, 1958	Member of Parliament, minister of Supply and Services, minister of Public Works, minister responsible for the Canada Mortgage and Housing Corporation	

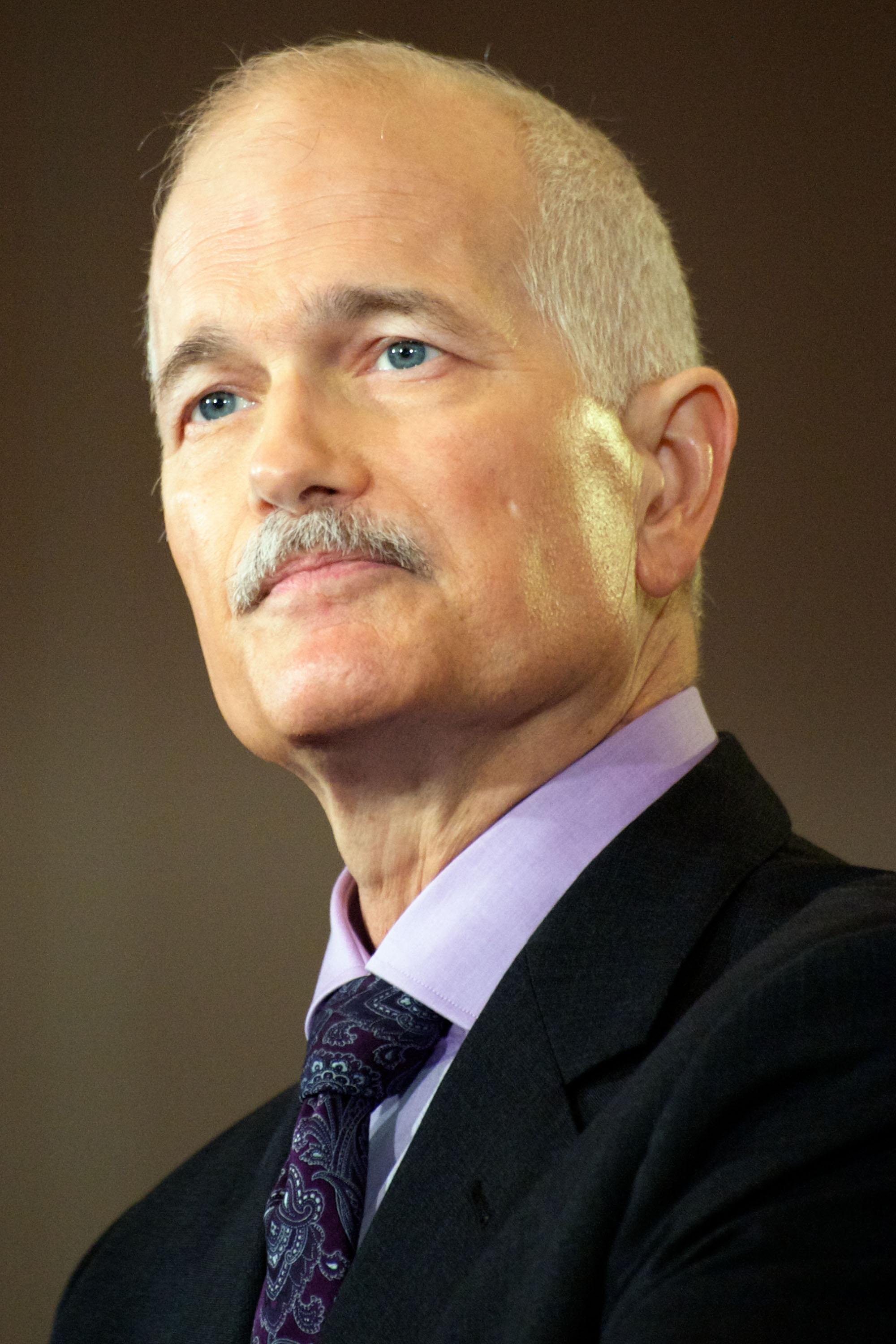
Jack Layton

=== Other government positions ===
Name	Original chapter	Notability	Ref.
Edwards Barham	Louisiana State University, 1955	Member of the Louisiana State Senate 1976–1980	
Neal Blaisdell	Bucknell, 1926	Former mayor of Honolulu, Hawaii 1955–1969; sitting mayor when Hawaii became a state in 1959	
Dave Greenspan^{S}	Troy University	Member of the Ohio House of Representatives 2017–2020	
Jonathan Jarvis^{S}	The College of William & Mary, 1975	Director of the United States National Park Service 2009–2016	
E. Earl Patton^{3}	Georgia Institute of Technology, 1949	Georgia state senator and Republican candidate for the U.S. Senate in 1968	
David Poythress	Emory, 1964	Georgia politician: former commissioner of labor; secretary of state; adjutant general of the Georgia National Guard; and candidate for governor	
Lloyd Rowland^{S}	Memphis, 1972	Deputy director, National Geospatial-Intelligence Agency; presidential rank of distinguished executive; retired colonel, USAF; awards include the Distinguished Flying Cross for combat operations, presidential meritorious rank, the Legion of Merit	
Nicholas Scoppetta^{S}	Bradley University, 1958	New York City fire commissioner 2002–2009	
Russell Wilson	University of Cincinnati, 1900	4-term mayor of Cincinnati	

=== U.S. astronauts ===
Name	Original chapter	Notability	Ref.
Scott Altman^{S}	Illinois, 1981	United States Navy; Space Shuttle astronaut, STS-90, STS-106, STS-109, STS-125	
Jake Garn^{S}	University of Utah, 1954	First member of Congress to fly into space (STS-51-D), 1985	
Greg Harbaugh^{S}	Purdue 1978	Space Shuttle astronaut, STS-39, STS-54, STS-71, STS-82	
John W. Young^{S}	Georgia Tech, 1952	United States Navy; astronaut, Gemini 3, Gemini 10, Apollo 10, Apollo 16, Space Shuttle, ninth person to walk on the Moon	

== Theology ==
Name	Original chapter	Notability	Ref.
M. Russell Ballard	University of Utah, 1947	Quorum of the Twelve, The Church of Jesus Christ of Latter-day Saints	
Theodore M. Burton	University of Utah, 1932	First Quorum of Seventy, The Church of Jesus Christ of Latter-day Saints	
Terence Finlay^{S}	University of Western Ontario, 1959	Retired archbishop of the Anglican Church of Canada	
Titus Lowe^{S}	Ohio Wesleyan, 1900	Bishop, Methodist Episcopal Church and The Methodist Church	
Arthur Wheelock Moulton^{S}	Hobart College, 1939	Bishop and president of the Pacific Province for the Episcopal Church	
William B. Oden^{S}	Oklahoma State University, 1957	Bishop, United Methodist Church	
Hugh W. Pinnock	University of Utah, 1958	First Quorum of the Seventy and Presidency of the Seventy in the Church of Jesus Christ of Latter-day Saints	
William McFerrin Stowe^{S}	University of Miami, 1938	Bishop, the Methodist Church	

== Writing and journalism ==
Name	Original chapter	Notability	Ref.
Mike Adams^{S}	Mississippi State University, 1887	Conservative political columnist, writer, author and professor at University of North Carolina, Wilmington	
George Ade^{S}	Purdue University, 1887	Writer, newspaper columnist (Fables in Slang), humorist	
Hervey Allen^{S}	Pittsburgh, 1915	Author of Anthony Adverse, and co-editor of Rivers of America Series	
H. Jackson Brown Jr.^{S}	Emory, 1962	Author of Life's Little Instruction Book, New York Times Best Seller list	
W. Bruce Cameron^{S}	Westminster College, 1978	Author, 8 Simple Rules for Dating My Teenage Daughter	
Milton Caniff^{S}	Ohio State University, 1930	Cartoonist, Terry and the Pirates, Steve Canyon	
Will Clarke	Louisiana State University, 1993	Author of The Worthy, Lord Vishnu's Love Handles	
Michael Connelly	University of Florida, 1980	Author of The Concrete Blond, The Lincoln Lawyer, Harry Bosch character novels	
Todd A. Fonseca	Marquette University, 1988	Author of The Time Cavern	
Stephen F. Hayes	DePauw University, 1993	Journalist, author and official biographer for former Vice President Dick Cheney	
Brett Murphy	Pittsburgh, 2013	Journalist with ProPublica, and winner of the 2024 Pulitzer Prize for Public Service reporting; former actor, Fever Pitch, Hope & Faith, Damages, Saturday Night Live	
Mark Oldman	Stanford University, 1991	Wine expert, TV host, and author, How to Drink Like a Billionaire	
Mike Peters^{S}	Washington University in St. Louis, 1965	Cartoonist (Mother Goose & Grimm); Pulitzer Prize–winning editorial cartoonist, Dayton Daily News	
Booth Tarkington^{S}	Purdue University, 1893	Pulitzer Prize–winning novelist for The Magnificent Ambersons and Alice Adams	

== Notes ==
^{S} - Recipient of the Significant Sig Award
