= David Kent Harrison =

American mathematician

- Born: April 6, 1931; Massachusetts
- Died: December 21, 1999 (aged 68); Barnstable, Massachusetts
- Education: Princeton University
- Occupation: Mathematician
- Awards: Guggenheim Fellowship

David Kent Harrison (April 6, 1931, Massachusetts – December 21, 1999, Barnstable, Massachusetts) was an American mathematician, specializing in algebra, particularly homological algebra and valuation theory.

He completed his PhD at Princeton University in 1957; his dissertation, titled On torsion free abelian groups, was written under the supervision of Emil Artin.

Harrison was a faculty member from 1959 to 1963 at the University of Pennsylvania and from 1963 to 1993 at the University of Oregon, retiring there as professor emeritus in 1993.

He developed a commutative cohomology theory for commutative algebras. Along with his colleague Marie A. Vitulli, he developed a unified valuation theory for rings with zero divisors that generalized both Krull and Archimedean valuations.

He was a Guggenheim Fellow for the academic year 1963–1964. He supervised 28 doctoral students including Joel Cunningham. Ann Hill Harrison endowed the Harrison Memory Award for outstanding mathematical students at the University of Oregon. He is survived by his son, composer and pianist Michael Harrison, a Guggenheim Fellow for the academic year 2018–2019, and his daughter Jo Ellen Harrison.

== Selected publications ==
- Harrison, D. K. (1959). "Infinite abelian groups and homological methods". Annals of Mathematics. 69 (2): 366–391. doi:10.2307/1970188. hdl:10338.dmlcz/101186. JSTOR 1970188.
- Harrison, D. K. (1963). "Abelian extensions of arbitrary fields". Transactions of the American Mathematical Society. 106 (2): 230–235. doi:10.1090/S0002-9947-1963-0142545-X.
- with J. M. Irwin, C. L. Peercy, and E. A. Walker: Harrison, D. K.; Irwin, J. M.; Peercy, C. L.; Walker, E. A. (1963). "High extensions of Abelian groups". Acta Mathematica Hungarica. 14 (3–4): 319–330. doi:10.1007/BF01895718. S2CID 117185748.
- "On the structure of Ext". In: Abelian Groups (Proc. Sympos., New Mexico State Univ., 1962). 1963. pp. 195–209.
- Abelian extensions of commutative rings. American Mathematical Society. 1965.
- with Stephen U. Chase and Alex F. T. W. Rosenberg: Galois theory and cohomology of commutative rings. American Mathematical Society. 1965.
- Finite and infinite primes for rings and fields. Memoirs of the American Mathematical Society, No. 68. 1966; 62 pp.
- with Joel Cunningham: Witt rings. Department of Mathematics, University of Kentucky. 1970.
- with Hoyt D. Warner: Harrison, David; Warner, Hoyt (1973). "Infinite primes of fields and completions". Pacific Journal of Mathematics. 45 (1): 201–216. doi:10.2140/pjm.1973.45.201.
- Harrison, D.K (1975). "A Grothendieck ring of higher degree forms" (PDF). Journal of Algebra. 35 (1–3): 123–138. doi:10.1016/0021-8693(75)90039-3.
- Harrison, David (1979). "Double coset and orbit spaces". Pacific Journal of Mathematics. 80 (2): 451–491. doi:10.2140/pjm.1979.80.451.
- Harrison, D. K. (1985). "Bipowers in number fields". Proceedings of the American Mathematical Society. 95 (2): 174–178. doi:10.1090/S0002-9939-1985-0801318-2.
  - Harrison, D. K. (1986). "Erratum to: Bipowers in number fields". Proceedings of the American Mathematical Society. 97 (2): 378. doi:10.1090/S0002-9939-1986-0835904-1.
- with Cornelius Greither: "A Galois correspondence for radical extensions of fields" (PDF). Journal of Pure and Applied Algebra. 46: 257–270. 1986.
- with Bodo Pareigis: "Witt rings of higher degree forms". Communications in Algebra. 16 (6): 1275–1313. 1985.
- with M. A. Vitulli: Harrison, D.K.; Vltulli, M A. (1989). "Complex-valued places and CMC subsets of a field". Communications in Algebra. 17 (10): 2529–2537. doi:10.1080/00927878908823860.
- with Frank DeMeyer and Rick Miranda: Demeyer, Frank; Harrison, David; Miranda, Rick (1989). Quadratic forms over Q and Galois extensions of commutative rings. Memoirs of the American Mathematical Society, Volume 77, Number 394. Providence, Rhode Island. ISBN 9780821824573.
- with C. Greither: Greither, Cornelius; Harrison, D. K. (1989). "On the monoid of tame extensions". Transactions of the American Mathematical Society. 311 (2): 657–682. doi:10.1090/S0002-9947-1989-0978371-7.
