= Hilbert–Speiser theorem =

Result on cyclotomic fields, characterising those with a normal integral basis

In mathematics, the Hilbert–Speiser theorem is a result on cyclotomic fields, characterising those with a normal integral basis. More generally, it applies to any finite abelian extension of Q, which by the Kronecker–Weber theorem are isomorphic to subfields of cyclotomic fields.

Hilbert–Speiser Theorem. A finite abelian extension K/Q has a normal integral basis if and only if it is tamely ramified over Q.

This is the condition that it should be a subfield of Q(ζ_{n}) where n is a squarefree odd number. This result was introduced by Hilbert (1897, Satz 132, 1998, theorem 132) in his Zahlbericht and by Speiser (1916, corollary to proposition 8.1).

In cases where the theorem states that a normal integral basis does exist, such a basis may be constructed by means of Gaussian periods. For example if we take n a prime number p > 2, Q(ζ_{p}) has a normal integral basis consisting of all the p-th roots of unity other than 1. For a field K contained in it, the field trace can be used to construct such a basis in K also (see the article on Gaussian periods). Then in the case of n squarefree and odd, Q(ζ_{n}) is a compositum of subfields of this type for the primes p dividing n (this follows from a simple argument on ramification). This decomposition can be used to treat any of its subfields.

Cornelius Greither, Daniel R. Replogle, and Karl Rubin et al. (1999) proved a converse to the Hilbert–Speiser theorem:

Each finite tamely ramified abelian extension K of a fixed number field J has a relative normal integral basis if and only if J =Q.

There is an elliptic analogue of the theorem proven by Anupam Srivastav and Martin J. Taylor (1990). It is now called the Srivastav-Taylor theorem (1996).
