= Vitrue, Inc. =

Provider of social media publishing software services

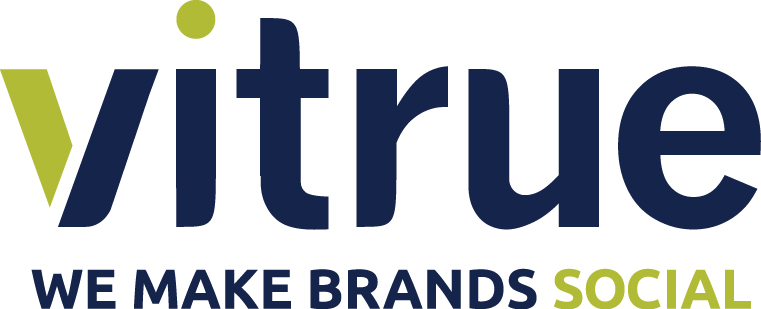
- Industry: social media publishing software
- Founded: May 2006
- Founder: Reggie Bradford
- Successor: Oracle Corporation
- Headquarters: Atlanta
- Products: software-as-a-service (SaaS)
- Services: Publishing, management, moderation & measurement of customer relations across the social web

Vitrue, Inc. is a provider of social media publishing software, offering software-as-a-service (SaaS) tools that integrate with Facebook and Twitter.

== History ==
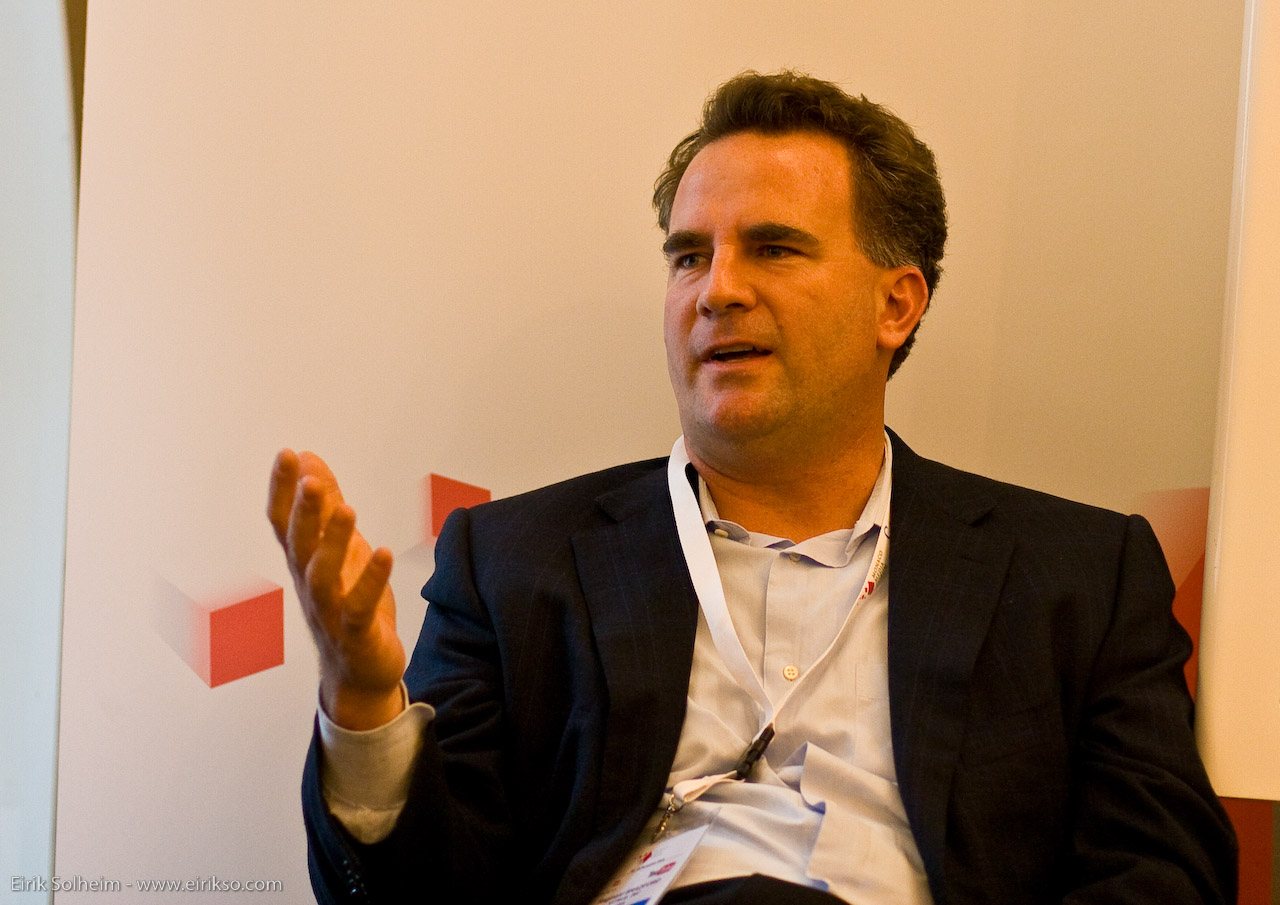
Reggie Bradford in 2008

Vitrue, Inc. was co-founded in Atlanta in May 2006 by entrepreneur Trevor Wright and former Tandberg Television president Reggie Bradford with venture capital from Neil Sequeira of General Catalyst Partners. The company offers software and services to manage customer relations across the social web.

Vitrue publisher launched a suite of scheduling, moderation, and analytics tools for marketers in 2009. In May 2010, the company released Vitrue Tabs.

Vitrue acquired Sharkle, founded by Trevor Wright, in May 2006. As of 2011, Virtue is undergoing global expansion.

On May 23, 2012, Oracle Corporation announced the acquisition of Vitrue for $300 million.

Competitors in the space include Hearsay Social and Social Ware.
