= Lloyd Rowland =

US Air Force NGA deputy director

Lloyd Rowland retired as the Deputy Director of the National Geospatial-Intelligence Agency (NGA). As Deputy Director he assisted the Director in formulating policy and managing agency activities in order to accomplish NGA's mission. Rowland was appointed Deputy Director effective October 1, 2006, and was awarded the Presidential Rank Award of Distinguished Executive.

Previously, Rowland served in numerous leadership positions throughout NGA such as Business Executive, Deputy Director of the Office of Business Transformation, Director of Global Operations, Associate Deputy Director of Operations, Director of Geospatial Information, Deputy Director of the Central Imagery Tasking Office, and Associate Director of Assessments. Mr. Rowland was appointed to the Defense Intelligence Senior Executive Service (DISES) in 1996.

== Military career ==
Rowland spent 24 years in the United States Air Force. During this time he commanded a squadron in Operation Desert Storm and had various postings throughout the U. S., Europe, the Middle East, and Asia. His career focused on combat search and rescue and reconnaissance force employment and imagery management.

His awards include the Distinguished Flying Cross for combat operations, Presidential Meritorious Rank, the Legion of Merit, the Defense Superior Service Medal, and the Air Medal.

== Education and training ==
Rowland has degrees from Memphis State University and the University of Southern California. His professional education includes Squadron Officer School, Armed Forces Staff College, the Air War College, the Intelligence Community Senior Leaders Program, the Intelligence Fellows Program, and the Harvard Senior Managers in Government Program.

He is a member of the President's Advisory Council at Wesley Theological Seminary in Washington, D. C., and is a board member of the Intelligence and National Security Alliance, and advisor to the United States Geospatial-Intelligence Foundation Board of Directors.

This article contains information from the United States Federal Government and is in the public domain.
