= Cornelius Greither =

German mathematician (born 1956)

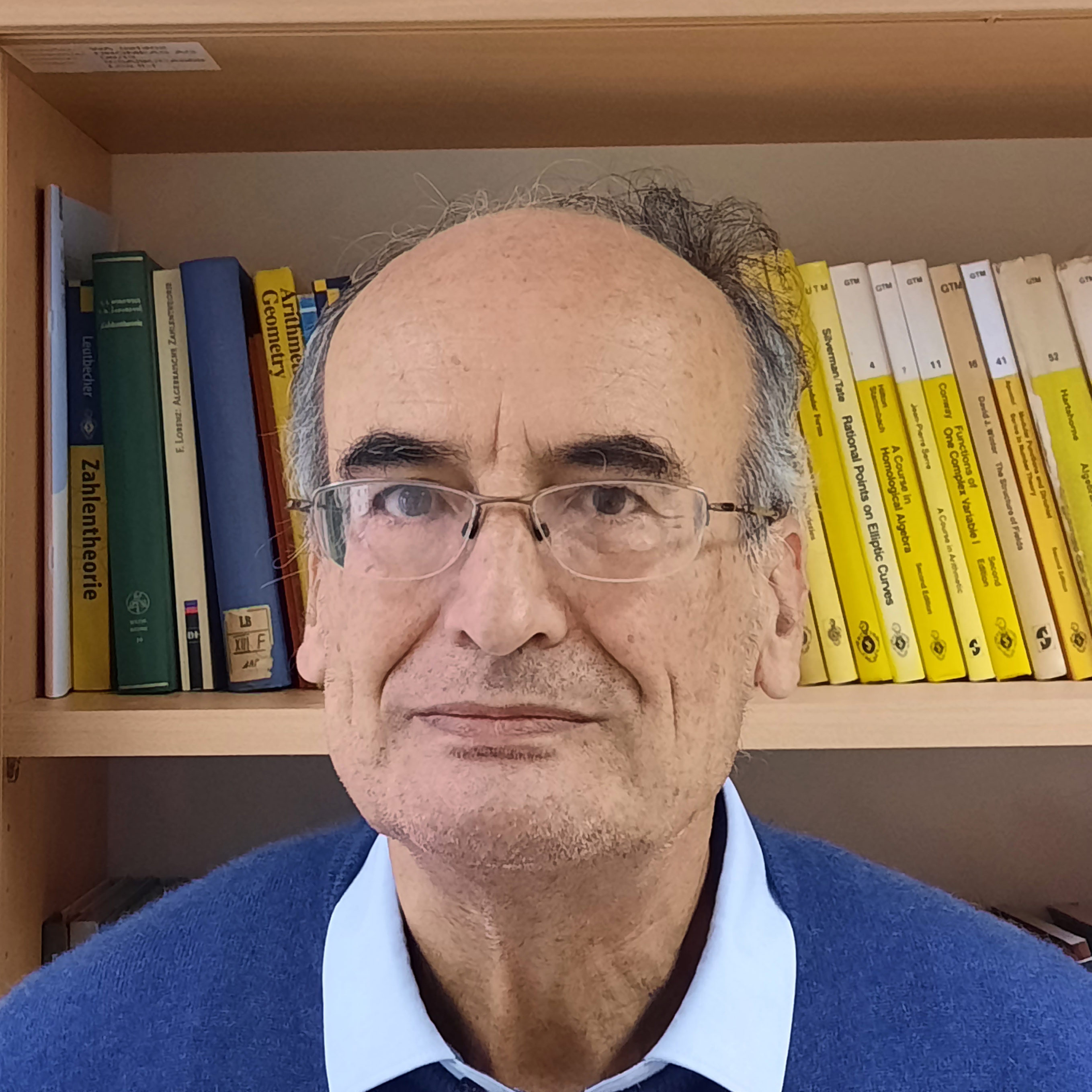
- Born: 1956 (age 69–70)
- Education: LMU Munich
- Scientific career
- Fields: Mathematics
- Workplaces: University of the Bundeswehr Munich

Cornelius Greither (born 1956) is a German mathematician specialising in Iwasawa theory and the structure of Galois modules.

== Education and career ==
Greither completed his PhD in 1983 at LMU Munich under the supervision of Bodo Pareigis: his thesis bears the title Zum Kürzungsproblem kommutativer Algebren. He habilitated in 1988 at same university, with thesis title Cyclic Galois extensions and normal bases.

In 1992, Greither proved the Iwasawa main conjecture for abelian number fields in the $p=2$ case. In 1999, together with D. R. Rapogle, K. Rubin, and A. Srivastav, he proved a converse to the Hilbert–Speiser theorem.

Greither was a full professor at the University of the Bundeswehr Munich. He retired in 2022, and he is now an emeritus.

Greither is on the editorial boards of the journals Archivum Mathematicum (Brno), New York Journal of Mathematics, as well as the Journal de Théorie des Nombres de Bordeaux. Until 2014, he was an associate editor of Annales mathématiques du Québec.
