= Joel Cunningham =

Joel Cunningham (born 15 June 1944) was the fifteenth vice chancellor of the University of the South and the former president of Susquehanna University. He grew up in Oak Ridge, Tennessee and graduated summa cum laude from the University of Chattanooga in 1965 with majors in mathematics and psychology and completed his master's and doctoral degrees in mathematics from the University of Oregon. Cunningham is a member of the Sigma Chi fraternity. He began his career in academe as a member of the faculty at the University of Kentucky, where he taught mathematics for five years. He made his first return to Tennessee, to his alma mater, in fact, when he was appointed dean of continuing education and mathematics faculty member at the University of Tennessee at Chattanooga, in 1974. He served a year as an American Council on Education Fellow with the Chancellor of the University of Tennessee, Knoxville, and the President of the University of Tennessee. He left Chattanooga in 1979 to become vice president for academic affairs, dean of the faculty, and professor of mathematics at Susquehanna University in Pennsylvania. In 1984 he was named president there where he remained until 2000, when he was elected vice chancellor by Sewanee's board of trustees and made his second Tennessee homecoming. He served in this position until 2010.

Highlights of Cunningham's service include a wide range of construction projects that take in both new facilities and major renovations, and a capital campaign, The Sewanee Call, which exceeded its $185 million goal to raise more than $205 million. The first two major projects completed under Cunningham were Humphreys Hall, the first new residence hall in more than 30 years, and Nabit Art Building, a project long sought and long deferred. Cunningham gained control of the Phi Delta Theta house for conversion to university use as the McGriff Alumni House. Gailor Hall was renovated to become the Gailor Center for Languages and Literature, St. Luke's Hall was converted into a desirable residence hall, and All Saints' Chapel was refurbished. Cunningham presided over the celebration of the sesquicentennial anniversary of the university's founding in 2007–08, which coincided with the end of the successful capital campaign and the dedication of the state-of-the-art science building Spencer Hall. During the final year of Dr. Cunningham's service, a major renovation and addition to Snowden Hall took shape as a new home for the forestry, geology and natural resources departments. He joined the faculty full-time after stepping down as vice chancellor.
