= Howard =

Howard is a masculine given name derived from the English surname Howard. The Oxford Dictionary of English Christian Names (1945) notes that "the use of this surname as a christian name is quite recent and there seems to be no particular reason for it except that it is the name of several noble families". The surname has a number of possible origins; in the case of the noble house, the likely source is the Norse given name Hávarðr, composed of the elements há ("high") and varðr ("guardian").

Diminutives include Howie and Ward. Howard reached peak popularity in the United States in the 1920s, when it ranked as the 26th most popular boys' name. As of 2018, it had fallen to 968th place.

== People with the given name ==
- Howard Allen (1949–2020), American serial killer
- Howard Duane Allman (1946–1971), American guitar virtuoso
- Howard Anderson (disambiguation), name of several people
- Howard Andrew (1934–2021), American poker player
- Howard Ashman (1950–1991), American playwright, lyricist and stage director
- Howard Baker (disambiguation), name of several people
- Howard Berman (born 1941), American attorney and politician
- Howard Bragman (1956–2023), American crisis manager and publicist
- Howard W. Brill (born 1943), chief justice of the Arkansas Supreme Court
- Howard Graham Buffett (born 1954), American businessman, politician, philanthropist, photographer, farmer, and conservationist
- Howard Burnett (athlete) (born 1961), Jamaican track and field athlete
- Howard J. Burnett (1929–2019), American president of Washington & Jefferson College
- Howard Carpendale (born 1946), German singer
- Howard Carter (disambiguation), name of several people
- Howard S. Chasanow (1937–2017), justice of the Maryland Court of Appeals
- Howard Chaykin (born 1950), American comic book artist and writer
- Howard Y T Cheng (born 1981), champion apprentice jockey in Hong Kong
- Howard Cosell (1918–1995), sports broadcaster
- Howard "Ward" Cunningham (born 1949), American founder of WikiWikiWeb
- Howard B. Cushing (1838–1871), American soldier during the Civil War
- Howard David (fl. 1990s–2010s), American sportscaster
- Howard Davies (disambiguation), name of several people
- Howard Davis (disambiguation), name of several people
- Howard Dean (born 1948), American politician
- Howard Donald (born 1968), English singer
- Howard Devoto (born Howard Trafford, 1952), English singer-songwriter
- Howard Duff (1913–1990), American actor
- Howard Eastman (born 1970), Guyanese-British boxer
- Howard Ehmke (1894–1959), American baseball pitcher
- Howard Eisenberg (born 1926), American author and journalist
- Howard Eisley (born 1972), American basketball player and coach
- Howard Engel (1931–2019), Canadian mystery writer
- Howard Eskin (born 1951), American sports radio personality
- Howard Evans (disambiguation), name of several people
- Howard Fast (1914–2003) American novelist and television writer
- Howard Fineman (1948–2024), American journalist and television commentator
- Howard Florey (1898–1968), Australian pharmacologist
- Howard Gardner (born 1943), American developmental psychologist
- Howard Goodall (born 1958), British musician, musicologist and TV presenter
- Howard Grant (boxer) (born 1966), Jamaican-Canadian boxer
- Howard Hanson (1896–1981), American composer, conductor, educator, and music theorist
- Howard Hawks (1896–1977), American producer
- Howard Head (1914-1991), American businessman
- Howard Hesseman (1940–2022), American actor
- Howard Hotson (fl. 2000–2020s), British historian
- Howard A. Howe (1901–1976), American virologist
- Howard Hughes (1905–1976), American aviation pioneer and film mogul
- Howard Jacobson (born 1942), British novelist and journalist
- Howard Johnson (disambiguation), name of several people
- Howard Jones (disambiguation), name of several people
- Howard Judd (1935–2007), American physician and medical researcher
- Howard Kazanjian (born 1942), Armenian-American film producer
- Howard Keel (1919–2004), singer and actor born Harry Keel
- Howard Kendall (1946–2015), English football player and manager
- Howard Kirshbaum (born 1938), associate justice of the Colorado Supreme Court
- Howard Andrew Knox (1885–1949), American physician
- Howard Kurtz (born 1953), American journalist and author
- Howard Lassoff (1955–2013), American-Israeli basketball player
- Howard Lederer (born 1964), professional poker player
- Howard Lesnick (1931–2020), American, Jefferson B. Fordham Professor of Law, University of Pennsylvania Law School
- Howard Long (1905–1939), American convicted murderer
- H. P. Lovecraft (1890–1937), American writer (full name Howard Phillips Lovecraft)
- Howard Lutnick (born 1961), United States Secretary of Commerce
- Howard Hamilton Mackey (1901–1987), American architect, educator
- Howard McNear (1905–1969), American radio and television actor
- Howard Marks (1945–2016), teacher, drug smuggler and author
- Howard Matthews (1885–1963), English footballer
- Howard W. Mattson (1927–1998), American chemist and journalist
- Howard Metzenbaum (1917–2008) American politician and businessman
- Howard Morris (1919–2005), American actor, comedian, and director
- Howard T. Odum (1924–2002), American ecologist
- Howard Payne (athlete) (1931–1992), English hammer thrower
- Howard Pyle (1853–1911), American illustrator, painter, and author
- Howard Schatz, American fine art photographer
- Howard Roberts (1929–1992) American guitarist, educator, and session musician
- Howard Schultz (born 1953), American businessman and CEO of Starbucks
- Howard Shane, American Autism researcher
- Howard Shore (born 1946), Canadian composer
- Howard Sims (1917–2003) African-American tap dancer
- Howard da Silva (1909–1986), American actor, director and musical performer
- Howard Smalley (born 1942), New Zealand cricketer
- Howard Smith (disambiguation), name of several people
- Howard Smothers (born 1973), American football player
- Howard Spira, American gambler who was paid by George Steinbrenner to find dirt on baseball player Dave Winfield
- Howard Stableford (born 1959), British television and radio presenter
- Howard Staunton (1810–1874), British chess player and Shakespearean scholar
- Howard Stern (born 1954), American talk-radio host
- Howard Stelzer (born 1974) American electro-acoustic music composer
- Howard K. Stern (born 1968), attorney for Anna Nicole Smith
- Howard Stidham (born 1954), American football player
- Howard Stupp (born 1955), Canadian Olympic wrestler
- Howard Tayler (born 1968), American cartoonist
- Howard Turner (1897–1976), American football player
- Howard Unruh (1921–2009), American spree killer
- Howard Van Smith (1909–1987), American journalist
- Howard Wales (1943–2020), American musician
- Howard Walker (disambiguation), name of several people
- Howard Walter (1883–1918), American Congregationalist minister and hymnist
- Howard Washington (born 1998), American-Canadian basketball player
- Howard Watt (1911–2005), South African rugby union player
- Howard Watts III (born 1987), American politician
- Howard Webb (born 1971), English professional football referee
- Howard Weyers (1934–2018), American football player and assistant coach
- Howard Wilkinson (born 1943), English football manager
- Howard Williams (disambiguation), name of several people
- Howard Wilson (American football) (born 1995), American football player
- Howard Wilson (physicist), British physicist
- Howard Zinn (1922–2010), American historian, academic, author, playwright, and social activist

== People known as Howie ==
- Howie Auer (1908–1985), American football player
- Howie B (born 1963), Scottish musician and producer Howard Bernstein
- Howie Beck (born 1970), Musical artist
- Howie Bedell (born 1935), American baseball player
- Howie Braun (1912–1996), American basketball player and coach
- Howie Brode (born 1963), American racing driver
- Howie Brown (1922–1975), American football player
- Howie Camnitz (1881–1960), American baseball player
- Howie Camp (1893–1960), American baseball player
- Howie Carl (1938–2005), American basketball player
- Howie Carr (born 1952), American journalist
- Howie Carter (1904–1991), American baseball player
- Howie Casey (born 1937), English R&B and rock saxophonist
- Howie Charbonneau (born 1955), American soccer player
- Howie Chizek (1947–2012), American sports announcer
- Howie Choset (born 1968), American roboticist
- Howie Clark (born 1974), American baseball player
- Howie Colborne (born 1950), Canadian ice hockey player
- Howie Crittenden (1933–2013), American basketball player
- Howie Dallmar (1922–1991), American basketball player and coach
- Howie Davis, American basketball executive
- Howie Day (born 1981), American singer-songwriter
- Howie Dickenman (born 1946), American basketball player-coach
- Howie DiSavino III (born 2001), American racing driver
- Howie Dorough (born 1973), American musician with Backstreet Boys
- Howie Draper (born 1967), Canadian hockey coach
- Howie Epstein (1955–2003), American musician
- Howie Ferguson (1930–2005), American football player
- Howie Fitzgerald (1902–1959), American baseball player
- Howie Fox (1921–1955), American baseball player
- Howie Glover (1935–2021), Canadian ice hockey player
- Howie Gorman (1913–1984), American baseball player
- Howie Goss (1934–1996), American baseball player
- Howie Gregory (1886–1970), American baseball player
- Howie Haak (1911–1999), American Major League Baseball scout
- Howie Hansen (1925–1952), American gridiron football player
- Howie Hawkins, American politician and activist
- Howie Haworth (1893–1953), American baseball player
- Howie Heggedal (1949–2017), Canadian ice hockey player
- Howie Hoffman (1921–1996), American basketball player
- Howie Horwitz (1918–1976), American television producer
- Howie Hubler, American trader
- Howie Hughes (1939–2025), Canadian ice hockey player
- Howie Janotta (1924–2010), American basketball player
- Howie Johnson (1925–2015), American golfer
- Howie Jolliff (born 1938), American basketball player
- Howie Jones (baseball) (1897–1972), American baseball player
- Howie Jones (rugby union) (1907–1983), Welsh rugby union player
- Howie Judson (1925–2020), American baseball player
- Howie Kane (1941–2023), American singer
- Howie Kendrick (born 1983), American baseball player
- Howie King (born 1969), Irish footballer
- Howie Klein (1948–2025), American political activist and record company executive
- Howie Koplitz (1938–2012), American baseball player
- Howie Krist (1916–1989), American baseball player
- Howie Landa, American basketball player and coach
- Howie Lee (1931–2014), Canadian ice hockey player
- Howie Livingston (1922–1994), American football player
- Howie Lockhart (1896–1956), Canadian ice hockey player
- Howie Long (born 1960), American former football player and actor
- Howie MacDonald (born 1965), Canadian fiddler and entertainer
- Howie Mandel (born 1955), Canadian comedian and actor
- Howie McCarty (1919–1974), American basketball player
- Howie McClennan (1907–2002), American labor union leader
- Howie McFarland (1910–1993), American baseball player
- Howie Meeker (1923–2020), Canadian hockey player, TV sports announcer, MP
- Howie Menard (born 1942), Canadian ice hockey player
- Howie Miller, Cree comedian
- Howie Montgomery (born 1940), American basketball player
- Howie Morales (born 1973), American politician
- Howie Morenz (1902–1937), Canadian ice hockey player
- Howie Moss (1919–1989), American baseball player
- Howie Nave (born 1956), American comedian
- Howie Nunn (1935–2012), American baseball player
- Howie O'Daniels (1907–1991), American football, basketball, and baseball coach
- Howie Odell (1910–2000), American football player and coach
- Howie Parker (1926–2009), American football player
- Howie Payne (born 1970), English musician
- Howie Pollet (1921–1974), American baseball player
- Howie Pyro (1960–2022), American bassist
- Howie Rader (1921–1991), American basketball player
- Howie Reed (1936–1984), American baseball player
- Howie Richmond (1918–2012), American music industry executive
- Howie Rose (born 1954), American sportscaster
- Howie Roseman (born 1975), American football executive
- Howie Ruetz (1927–1999), American football player
- Howie Scannell Jr. (born 1966), Canadian racing driver
- Howie Schneider (1930–2007), American cartoonist and author
- Howie Schultz (1922–2009), American baseball & basketball player
- Howie Schumm (1940–2015), Canadian football player
- Howie Schwab (1960–2024), American television personality
- Howie Schwarzman (1927–2020), American magician
- Howie Seago (born 1953), American actor and director
- Howie Severino (born 1961), Filipino broadcast journalist
- Howie Shanks (1890–1941), American baseball outfielder
- Howie Shannon (1923–1995), American basketball player
- Howie Shia, Canadian animator
- Howie Slater (1903–1964), American football player
- Howie Smith (born 1943), American jazz musician
- Howie Stange (1924–1990), American singer-songwriter
- Howie Storie (1911–1968), American baseball player
- Howie Tamati (born 1953), New Zealand international rugby league footballer and coach
- Howie Tee (1964–2025), American DJ
- Howie Tipton (1911–1966), American football player
- Howie Turner (1922–2004), American gridiron football player
- Howie Vogts (1929–2010), American football coach
- Howie Weinberg (born 2000), American audio engineer
- Howie Westervelt (1921–1992), American dirt modified racing driver
- Howie Williams (born 1936), American football player
- Howie Williams (basketball) (1927–2004), American basketball player
- Howie Williamson (1904–1969), American baseball player
- Howie Winter (1929–2020), American mobster
- Howie Wright (born 1947), American basketball player
- Howie Yanosik (born 1933), Canadian ice hockey player
- Howie Yeager (1915–2000), American football player
- Howie Young (1937–1999), Canadian ice hockey player, actor

== Fictional characters ==
- Howard Beale, from the film Network
- Howard Bellamy (Doctors), in the British soap opera Doctors
- Howard Cunningham (Happy Days), in the TV series Happy Days
- Howard Colvin, from The Wire
- Howard Hamlin, from Better Call Saul
- Howard Huge, a comic strip dog
- Howard McBride, in the animated series The Loud House
- Howard Moon, in the TV series The Mighty Boosh
- Howard Roark, protagonist of Ayn Rand's novel The Fountainhead
- Howard Stark, father of Tony Stark/Iron Man
- Howard Wolowitz, on the TV series The Big Bang Theory
- Howard the Duck, a comic book character
