= George Bell (basketball) =

American police officer and basketball player (1957–2025)

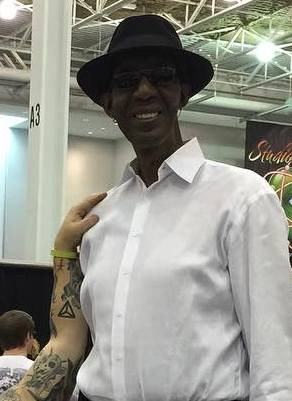
George Bell at the Hampton Tattoo Festival, 2016

George Bell, Jr. (June 12, 1957 – March 19, 2025) was an American basketball player, known for his tall stature of 7 ft 8 in (2.34 m). Guinness World Records recognized him as the tallest person in the United States in 2007. Bell played basketball as a college student and as a professional, signing with the Harlem Wizards. After his retirement from competitive sports, he worked as a deputy sheriff in Norfolk, Virginia.

== Early life, family and education ==
Bell was born in Portsmouth, Virginia. He first showed signs of his impending tallness when he stood 5 ft 4 in (1.63 m) at 9 years old. Bell said he had a medical condition called gigantism, which caused excessive growth hormone secretion during childhood. He stated that through high school he never grew so tall that he felt out of place. By the time he was in his early 20s, however, his height had exceeded 7 ft (2.1 m). Although he believed later that he was 7 ft 7 in (2.31 m), the measurements for the Guinness book showed he had grown another inch. He said he did not suffer from some of the other effects of gigantism, such as an enlarged heart, although he did have to take medications.

He attended college at Morris Brown College and Biola University, playing basketball for both schools.

== Career ==
Bell played basketball professionally with the Harlem Wizards show team. He retired from basketball at age 30.

He was a deputy sheriff in Norfolk, Virginia, from December 2000 to May 2014.

=== In the media ===
Bell was featured on the AMC show Freakshow, throughout its two seasons. In an interview for the show, he revealed that he had appeared as an alien who landed on top of the L.A. Coliseum at the closing ceremonies of the 1984 Summer Olympics in Los Angeles. He also appeared on season 4 of American Horror Story.

== Personal life and death ==
Bell and his ex-wife Joyce raised a daughter, Dawnié Bell.

He died at his home in Durham, North Carolina on March 19, 2025. He was 67 years old.
