= Samuel J. Briskin =

American film producer

- Briskin in 1935
- Born: February 8, 1896; Riga, Russian Empire, or New York City, U.S.
- Died: November 14, 1968 (aged 72); Los Angeles, California, U.S.
- Occupation: Film producer
- Years active: 1925–1968

Samuel J. Briskin (February 8, 1896 – November 14, 1968) was one of the foremost producers of Hollywood's Golden Age, and head of production during his career at three of the "Big 8" major film studios: Columbia Pictures (twice), Paramount Pictures, and RKO Pictures. In the late 1950s, he was briefly on the board of directors of another major, Metro-Goldwyn-Mayer. During World War II, Briskin served in the army's Signal Corps as a film producer, attaining the rank of lieutenant colonel. After the war he co-founded Liberty Films with Frank Capra. They were later joined by William Wyler and George Stevens. The studio only produced two films, but both are now considered classics: It's a Wonderful Life and State of the Union. All three of his brothers were also film producers, as well as one of his sons, and his sister was married to the eventual Chairman of Columbia, where Briskin spent the last decade of his life as a vice-president and head of production until his death in 1968 from a heart attack.

== Early life ==
Briskin was born on February 8, 1896, in either Riga, Russia, or New York City. His parents were Benjamin and Rose Briskin. Two of his brothers, Irving and Murray, also became film producers, while his sister, Ida, married a film studio executive. Briskin also had one other brother, Barnett (Barney), who was also in the film industry as a theater manager and in sales capacities. While some sources have his birthplace is Riga, Russia, others indicate that he was born in New York, after his parents immigrated there. Briskin was a product of the public school system. He obtained his college degree in accounting from the College of the City of New York.

== Career ==
=== Silent era ===
After graduating college, Briskin worked as an accountant. Briskin entered the film industry as an accountant at Cohn-Brandt-Cohn Film Sales in 1920. In 1924, when the Cohn brothers incorporated CBC as Columbia Pictures, he left the studio and created an independent production company with George H. Davis named Banner Productions. The company was scheduled to produce 8 films, four on the east coast and four in California. The company was incorporated in May 1924, and produced over 20 films between 1925 and 1927. Briskin gave his brother, Irving, his start in the film industry, as an auditor for Banner. Irving would go on to be a film producer in his own right. The company's first film was The Truth About Women, a 1924 melodrama directed by Burton King, and starring Hope Hampton and Lowell Sherman. The picture was filmed at the Whitman Bennett Studios near Yonkers, New York. The next film Briskin would produce was The Man Without a Heart, again directed by King and filmed at the Bennett Studios, this time starring Kenneth Harlan and Jane Novak. In addition to producing the films, Briskin would also travel around the country making sales deals for the company's films. In 1925 Briskin would produce the melodrama, The Phantom Express, starring Ethel Shannon and George Periolat. This was followed in 1926 by the film Brooding Eyes, starring the legendary Lionel Barrymore.

1926 saw Briskin take a film crew on location to Sonora, Mexico, shooting for Whispering Canyon, starring Jane Novak and Robert Ellis. Late in 1926 Briskin's sister, Ida Briskin, was wed to Abe Schneider, an exec at Columbia Pictures. Late in 1926, George Davis died suddenly, and Briskin dissolved Banner.

=== The advent of sound and Columbia Pictures ===
After Banner, Briskin returned to work at Columbia Pictures, where he began producing for them in 1926, and in 1928 he was given control over 18 of their productions. By 1929, Briskin had risen to be a top executive at the studio, sharing honors with studio head Harry Cohn, in giving the closing address at Columbia's annual sales meeting in July 1929. By the end of 1929, Briskin was the assistant general manager of Columbia, and on a visit to New York City signed several Broadway playwrights to long-term contracts with the studio, including Elmer Harris, Jo Swerling, and Paul Hervey Fox. Not only was Briskin active in the production office at Columbia, but he also played on Columbia's baseball team, which competed in the Motion Picture Baseball League. It was while working at Columbia that Briskin met Frank Capra. In 1930, Briskin's brother Irving, who he had employed while at Banner, joined him as a producer at Columbia.

By the early 1930s, Briskin had gained a reputation of being a very thrifty producer. However, he was also known for putting the quality of the product over saving money. Joseph Walker, the cinematographer for the 1931 film Dirigible, directed by Frank Capra, explained why the film had not used stock footage of blimps, which would have been much less expensive:

[Briskin], the studio's general manager, who personally supervised the making of the picture, and who is perhaps more keenly exacting in the matter of getting a full dollar's worth of production for every dollar spent than any other executive in the business, was wise enough to see that an otherwise superlative production would fall flat if such scenes were made "merely adequate". Therefore he spared no expense in assuring absolute authenticity in every detail of the production.

In 1931 Harry Cohn became the first studio head to implement the new unit production system, wherein producers were given specific responsibility over individual films, rather than supervising dozens of pictures in a given year. Briskin was one of the first four of this new class of producer selected by Cohn, while still maintaining his assistant general manager status. In 1932 Briskin went from assistant general manager, to general manager at Columbia, the announcement being made by in early June by Sam Cohn.

In February 1933, Briskin's home was burglarized, the thieves absconding with $24,000 (in 1933 dollars) in jewels. Also in 1933, Briskin was appointed as the studios' representative for the producers-actors code committee. In February 1934 Briskin was named as the chairman of the Research Council of the Academy of Motion Picture Arts and Sciences (AMPAS). The following month Briskin was also appointed to the finance committee overseeing the Research Council. By 1934, Briskin's brother, Irving, was one of the Columbia's unit producers.

In 1934 Briskin was selected to be one of the personnel representing the film studios in their negotiations with the Motion Picture Theater Owners of America. Among the others representing the producers included Louis B. Mayer, Hal Roach, Jack L. Warner, B. B. Kahane, and Harold Lloyd. By this point, Briskin was considered one of the most important studio executives in the industry, being included a group called by some "the brain trust", which also included Hal B. Wallis, Jack L. Warner, B. B. Kahane, Harold Lloyd, Hal Roach, and Irving Thalberg. In June 1934 Briskin, acting as a representative for 8 major studios, met with representatives from film camera manufacturers, in an attempt to reach an agreement between the two sides to pool their resources in order to develop a silent film camera. In September 1934, Briskin signed a new contract with Columbia, after having been courted by Paramount. Later that month, he was elected to the producers branch of AMPAS, as well as being appointed a member of the executive committee. When the 1932 agreement between studios and freelance screenwriters expired in 1935, Briskin was selected as one of five producers, the others being Sol Wurtzel, Irving Thalberg, Hal Wallis, and Henry Herzbrun, to represent the studios in the negotiations. In addition to representing the producers in their negotiations with the writers, Briskin was also selected as one of six producers to negotiate the new contract with the actors' guild. In August 1935 Briskin was renegotiating his contract with Columbia. Speculation began that he was being approached by other studios, including MGM.

=== RKO years ===
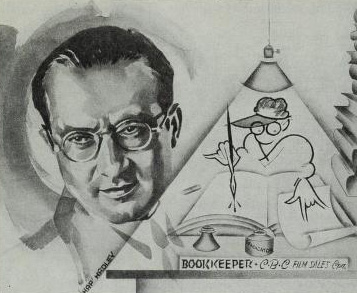
Cartoon image of Briskin from The Film Daily in 1936.

In September 1935, after seven years, Briskin resigned from Columbia, failing to reach an agreement with Harry Cohn over stock options. For years, many in the film industry knew that Briskin was responsible for many of the successes at Columbia, even though studio head Harry Cohn was taking the credit. Shortly after, reports began to circulate that he was headed to 20th Century-Fox. Shortly after that report, he was offered a front-office position at MGM, but turned it down because he wanted to be more actively involved in film production, which was followed by a denial from Fox that he was headed to that studio. One of the rumors which circulated was that Briskin was part of a group aligned with Consolidated Film Industries, which was attempting a takeover of Universal. By year's end, Briskin had agreed to a deal with Warner Bros. to produce 12 films, however that deal never reached fruition and Briskin ended up agreeing to a deal with RKO to join the studio as their vice-president in charge of production. The position was newly created especially for Briskin. B. B. Kahane remained as the overall head of RKO Studios, running all aspects other than production, but there was concern that Briskin would have conflict with long-term RKO producer, Pandro S. Berman. Conflict was averted when Berman received a one-year extension on his contract, wherein he had sole authority over his productions, answering only directly to Kahane.

Briskin in 1936

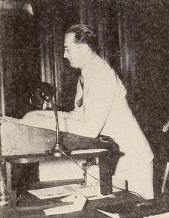
Briskin addressing the RKO sales conference at the Waldorf Astoria in New York City in 1936

That arrangement did not last long, and by February 1936, Briskin's role at the studio was changing. While still with the same title, he was no longer subservient to Kahane, having full control over all RKO production. In February 1936 Briskin was mentioned along with a handful of other producers as being in such demand that they could write their own ticket, the others mentioned included Thalberg, David O. Selznick, Darryl F. Zanuck, Hunt Stromberg, and Sol Wurtzel. By April of that year, Briskin was putting his mark on RKO. He purchased quite a few properties, signed numerous actors, and lured successful producers to the studio, such as Edward Small. Later that year, RKO gained the rights to the successful Irish play, The Plough and the Stars, by playwright Seán O'Casey. This led to Briskin being responsible for bringing Barry Fitzgerald to Hollywood for his American film debut. Fitzgerald was one of four members of the play's original cast at the Abbey Theatre in Dublin, who Briskin signed to appear in the film version of the same name. By the middle of the year, RKO was solidly Briskin's, with the full backing of studio head Leo Spitz, This led to Kahane, who had been with the studio since its inception, resigning in August, several months prior to the expiration of his contract, and heading to a vice-presidency at Columbia. For the upcoming 1936–37 production season, Briskin announced that he intended to have at least three star-caliber performers in each film. In September, Briskin was elected to the AMPAS board of governors, along with several others including Clark Gable, Darryl Zanuck, and Cecil B. DeMille. The following month, Briskin initiated a policy wherein the younger players under contract to RKO could appear in stage productions in stock and little theater companies for short periods, in order for the actors to gain experience. Also in October, Briskin was chosen to succeed Louis B. Mayer as chairman of the motion picture community chest. In 1936 Briskin led RKO to its most productive year up to that date. Before the end of the year, a new medium was being introduced, television. When asked about the threat this new entertainment source might pose to the film industry, Briskin thought that TV would actually help films. He felt that it might be the "... greatest thing that could happen to the industry." Rationalizing that "... 10 years ago when radio broadcasting began many feared people would sit at home with earphones and listen to the free radio entertainment. Instead, the movies have had their best years since radio broadcasting came in ..." In December, reports began to surface that he was up for a long-term contract at RKO, however, due to an impending reorganization, he was only given a one-year extension, with a promise of a long-term deal once the reorganization was complete. Briskin made the decision to begin color films at RKO. He was also responsible for bringing the Poverty Row producer, Maury M. Cohen, into RKO.

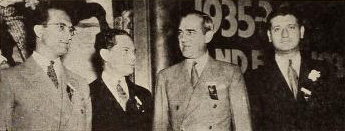
Left to right: Briskin, Leo Spitz, Ned E. Depinet, and Jules Levy, at the RKO sales conference in New York, 1936.

In 1937 Briskin was responsible for bringing Milton Berle to the screen. During a strike by the Federated Motion Picture Crafts union in 1937, there was concern that they would be joined by members of the Screen Actors Guild. Briskin was one of four producers chosen by the producers guild to negotiate with the actors' union to head off them joining the walkout. As the new film season started in the summer of 1937, Briskin announced that RKO would have a significant increase in their overall production budget from $14.5 million in the 1936–37 season, to $18 million for the 1937–38 season. In mid-July 1937, it was announced that Briskin had received a long-term extension on his contract, however, several months later it was revealed that the deal had never been finalized, and that Briskin was considering leaving RKO. In early November the change became official when Briskin resigned as RKO's head of production. Briskin had been offered a three-year deal by the studio, which he rejected. Rumors began to circulate about where Briskin was headed. In early December it was being reported that Briskin would be heading to Paramount, although he denied those reports.

=== Return to Columbia ===
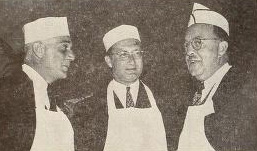
Briskin (center), along with Jack Cohn (right) at the 1939 Columbia Pictures convention in Atlantic City.

As 1938 began, there was much speculation as to where Briskin would go next. He was considered one of the top film executives in the industry. In mid-May, it was reported that Briskin was in negotiations with Sam Cohn to return to his former studio, Columbia, in the role of general manager. However, his name was still being discussed for other major positions throughout the industry, such as the production head at Universal Pictures. On May 26 it was announced that Briskin and Columbia had reached a 7-year agreement for him to take over as the head of the production at the studio, where he resumed his former position of general manager on May 30. As part of the agreement, Briskin was issued stock options on 10,000 shares of Columbia stock, with a value of $13.875 per share. Briskin's return to Columbia would also reunite him with his brother, Irving, who had been a producer at Columbia for several years. Samuel Briskin's would be one of the top money earners in Hollywood in 1938, his earnings topping $106,000, putting him in the top 10 at Columbia.

Later in 1938, when there was a pending hearing and lawsuit alleging unfair labor practices by the studios against directors, Briskin was chosen to be one of three producers representing the studios, alongside Darryl Zanuck and E. J. Mannix. Sitting across the table were W. S. Van Dyke, Howard Hawks, and Briskin's friend, Frank Capra. In 1939, Briskin was once again involved in potential legal proceedings, being one of a number of producers who were called to testify before the National Labor Relations Board, regarding alleged infractions by the studios against the Screen Writers Guild (SWG). During the hearings, it was alleged that Briskin had opposed the proposed merger between the SWG and the Authors Guild. After the outbreak of hostilities in Europe and Asia at the beginning of World War II, AMPAS created the Motion Picture Defense Committee, which was a sub-committee of the organization's Research Council. Headed by the council's chairman, Darryl F. Zanuck, Briskin was one of several producers named to the committee. The group was formed to advise various arms of the U.S. government in the creation and production of training films. Shortly after the committee's formation, it was decided that the facilities of Hollywood film studios would be made available to the army to use for filming and production. In mid-November 1940 Briskin, along with the committee's chair Major Nathan Levinson, participated in interviews with members of the Screen Writers Guild, in order to select writers to go to Monmouth, New Jersey to work with army personnel on developing scripts for training films.

=== The war years ===
In 1941 the U.S. Government announced an effort to increase cooperation between the different countries in North and South America, through the use of film. Nelson D. Rockefeller chaired the government committee, and requested the help of the Association of Motion Picture Producers. Y. Frank Freeman, the associations chairman, appointed Briskin the chair of the committee on South American Film Facilities. When the Motion Picture Defense Committee was expanded in 1941, Briskin continued to be one of the six producers. In April 1941, Harry Cohn promoted Briskin to Head of Production at Columbia. Briskin joined the Army Signal Corps as a reserve officer, commissioned as a major, and was put in charge of the film division of the War Committee. After the attack on Pearl Harbor by the Japanese on December 7, 1941, there was concern that film professionals in Hollywood who were officers in the armed forces reserves might be called to active duty. By May 1942, Briskin was acknowledged as the vice-chair of the Motion Picture Defense Committee. In that month, he and chair Nathan Levinson created a sub-committee in order to find more technicians to enlist in the Signal Corps. In June Briskin was rewarded with a six-year contract by Columbia, at a rate of $2000 per week, as well as stock options.

In August 1942 Briskin's duties at Columbia were divided between Harry Cohn and Sydney Buchman, in anticipation of his being called up to active duty in the army. Briskin was called to active duty by September, with Buchman resigning his position as President of the Screen Writers Guild to handle Briskin's responsibilities at Columbia. While on active duty, Columbia continued to keep Briskin under contract, although at a reduced salary of $300 per week. One of Briskin's roles in the Army Signal Corps was recruiting industry personnel to serve as cameramen and photographers for the army. In a report lamenting the loss of talent from Hollywood to the armed services, Briskin was one of four producers cited, along with Darryl Zanuck, Hal Roach, and John Hay Whitney. In late March 1943 Briskin suffered a heart attack while on active military service. Briskin received a medical discharge from the Army Signal Corps in May 1944. During his military service, Briskin was awarded the Legion of Merit. In July 1944, Briskin returned to Columbia, detaching from the army with the rank of lieutenant colonel. Shortly after his return to civilian life, Briskin parted ways with Columbia in September 1944.

=== Liberty Films ===
Shortly after Briskin left Columbia, it was announced that he would begin a production company with his long-time friend, Frank Capra, the company's highlight to be an annual Capra film. Because Capra was still on active duty in the army, Briskin was in charge of opening the company offices, and negotiating distribution deals, preparing the company to begin production as soon as Capra was discharged. Initially, the company was simply known as Capra-Briskin.

As this was happening, Briskin was asked to return to active duty, this time in the navy, for a brief stint in the beginning of March, 1945; he was assigned to the Photographic Sciences Laboratory, where he was to evaluate the Navy's filming activity. By the end of the month, he had finished his study, and submitted his findings to Captain Gene Markey, head of the Navy's Photographic Services, after which he returned to Hollywood to continue setting up Capra-Briskin. With Capra still in the service, Briskin incorporated the new film studio, with the name Liberty Films, in late April 1945. One of the first properties they went after was the hugely successful play, Harvey. In July, they convinced William Wyler to join their fledgling company, and he became part-owner, agreeing to start work for the company as soon as he was discharged from the army, and produce one film per year for the studio. In August, Briskin negotiated a deal with RKO Studios for Liberty Pictures to film 9 movies at the RKO studio, and in September Wyler announced that the company would produce 3 films a year for their deal with RKO. Before the end of the year George Stevens had also become a part owner in the venture.

The company announced in November 1945 that its first production would be James Stewart in It's a Wonderful Life, produced and directed by Capra. In Spring 1946 it was announced that Liberty would be getting a fifth partner, producer-director Victor Fleming, although that deal never saw fruition. The film was released in November 1946, but was a financial failure. Although it was in the top 7% of that year's films as ranked by box office gross, it was unable to recoup its high production cost of $2.3 million, much less show a profit. After the film's release, Briskin became an outspoken advocate for the policy of longer runs for films, allowing them to recoup the cost of production. Without longer runs, he told The Film Daily, the quality of films would decline, as production costs continued to escalate.

While the studio was receiving positive critical reviews, it was struggling financially. In March 1947, rumors began to circulate regarding the company being taken over by one of the major studios. The studio's next film, State of the Union, starring Spencer Tracy and Katharine Hepburn, was scheduled to be distributed by MGM. In addition to the MGM deal with Capra, Briskin sought out distribution deals with other major studios, including Paramount. The partners sought a major studio to buy Liberty Films before bank foreclosure, although Wyler and Stevens were "violently opposed" to the idea at first. In April rumors began to circulate that a deal was in the offing for a sale of the company to Paramount Pictures. Those rumors were confirmed the following month when Paramount bought Liberty. The four partners were given a total of between $3,450,000 and $4,000,000 in Paramount stock, and Capra, Wyler, and Stevens were offered five-picture contracts at Paramount. Briskin was given a studio executive position at Paramount which was specifically created for him, but Stevens decided not to accept the Paramount offer and continued as an independent producer. The deal took several months to reach fruition, finally culminating when the US Treasury signed off on the tax setup in September 1947. Briskin would stay at Paramount as a senior production executive through 1950.

=== The Paramount years ===
As the new decade dawned, it was speculated that Briskin would sign an agreement with Paramount Studios, in charge of production under Y. Frank Freeman, in the new position, Briskin would function as the de facto head of production for the studio. After accepting the position, his tenure was short lived, as he resigned in January 1951, due to an undisclosed illness, although he remained employed by the studio. By April, it was announced that Briskin would remain at Paramount, and had signed a five-year contract to produce for the studio. In July 1951 Briskin was selected to head up the "Movie Town U.S.A." radio advertising campaign for the Council of Motion Picture Companies (COMPO). The Movietime campaign was scheduled to debut on October 8, 1951, with over 200 acting stars and other Hollywood personalities volunteering their time to make personal appearances in all 48 of the U.S. State capitals, although those locations were later changed to 33 major cities, due to a scheduling conflict with many of the state governors. In addition to his responsibilities at Paramount and with COMPO, in late 1951 Briskin partnered with Sol Lesser to produce 6 films, which were distributed by United Artists. All the films were scheduled for a 1952 release, and Briskin was partly responsible for the financing along with Edward Small, as well as having production oversight. At the time, it was considered a very important independent partnership by the Hollywood community. The partnership, known as Associated Players and Producers, was short-lived, producing only one of the six films agreed to with Universal, Kansas City Confidential, a film noir starring John Payne.

In January 1953, Briskin was appointed to the executive board of the Screen Producers Guild.

While at Paramount, in 1955, he produced the highly commercially successful Strategic Air Command, starring James Stewart. After the success of Strategic Air Command, Paramount obtained the rights to The Sons of Katie Elder, and assigned the project to Briskin to produce, with Alan Ladd starring. However, when Ladd brought out the remainder of his contract with Paramount, the film was put on hold, and would not be produced until 1965, by a different producer, Hal B. Wallis. In May 1956, Briskin asked to be released from the final two years of his agreement with Paramount, to which the studio agreed. The one condition was that Briskin finish work on his remaining film commitment to the studio, The Joker is Wild, starring Frank Sinatra, which was being produced by an independent film company, A.M.B.L. Productions, under an agreement with Paramount.

=== MGM controversy and return to Columbia ===
In 1957 Briskin was embroiled in a controversy related to the control of MGM. As part of a battle between Joseph R. Vogel and Joseph Tomlinson, Briskin was brought in as a member of the Board of Directors of MGM, along with MGM's former production head, Louis B. Mayer, and also as a producer for the studio. However, the special board meeting which was held to appoint the two executives was held to be illegal by the Delaware Chancery Court, and the Mayer and Briskin appointments were overturned. The conflict continued on throughout the year, until MGM held a stockholders' meeting in October. During the meeting, the shareholders agreed to expand the board by adding ten new directors. Tomlinson's group was clearly routed, gaining only a single seat of the ten; that single seat was Briskin.

Briskin in 1959

His seat on MGM's board would last less than a year. After the unexpected death of studio head Harry Cohn in late February 1958, Columbia's board of directors selected a committee to pursue hiring his replacement. In early April it was confirmed that Briskin was one of those who they were considering. In April 1958 Briskin resigned from MGM, in order to return to Columbia, this time as vice president in Charge of West Coast Activities. In addition to his executive production roles, Briskin was also made one of 9 members of Fico's board of directors. Fico was a company formed with the express purpose of buying up shares of Columbia stock on the open market as a way to display confidence in the company. By the end of 1958, Briskin was vice president and general manager of the studio. In April 1959, Briskin announced an ambitious plan for Columbia, wherein they scheduled 99 films for release over an 18-month span, and studio head Abe Schneider (also Briskin's brother-in-law) tagged Briskin to head the program. Among the films scheduled for production during this span included Anatomy of a Murder, A Raisin in the Sun, and Suddenly, Last Summer. Also in 1959, Briskin made Glenn E. Miller Productions a Columbia affiliate, the new arm specializing film production for military and defense purposes. Something Briskin had experience in during World War II. In July, Briskin's brother, Irving, sold his independent television production company to Screen Gems (now Sony Pictures Television), Columbia's wholly owned subsidiary. After the sale, he went back to work at Columbia, where he had been prior to forming his own company. Shortly after, Briskin, reunited with his brother, announced that he was re-integrating Screen Gems back into Columbia, and it would no longer operate as a separate entity. Under Briskin, in July 1959 production hit an all-time high at Columbia, with over $11.5 million in production at one time. In August, despite rising production costs, Briskin took the unprecedented step of lowering the fees Columbia charged independent producers under contract to the studio. In September 1959 it was announced that Briskin had been elected to Columbia's board of directors, a position he held until his death. At the same time as Briskin was being elected to Columbia's board, it was announced that his son, Jerry, would be joining him at Columbia, working in the Screen Gems division as the producer for the television series, Manhunt. In December, Briskin's contract with Columbia was up for renewal by their shareholders.

== Filmography ==
As the head of production for several film studios, Briskin was in overall charge of all productions at those studios, in an executive producer capacity. However, over his career he would directly produce several films. They are listed below.

Year	Film	Director	Lead actors	Production company	Notes
1925	Wasted Lives	John Gorman	Elliott Dexter, Cullen Landis, Edith Roberts	Banner Productions	
1926	The Millionaire Policeman	Edward J. Le Saint	Herbert Rawlinson, Eva Novak	Banner Productions	The copyright on this film has it based on a novel by Briskin.
1934	Broadway Bill	Frank Capra	Warner Baxter, Myrna Loy	Columbia Pictures	
1934	The Captain Hates the Sea	Lewis Milestone	Victor McLaglen, Wynne Gibson, Alison Skipworth, John Gilbert, Helen Vinson	Columbia Pictures	Final film performance of Gilbert.
1934	No Greater Glory	Frank Borzage	George Breakston, Jimmy Butler	Columbia Pictures	Credited as Samuel Briskin
1934	Sisters Under the Skin	David Burton	Elissa Landi	Columbia Pictures	
1934	Twentieth Century	Howard Hawks	John Barrymore, Carole Lombard	Columbia Pictures	
1935	The Girl Friend	Edward N. Buzzell	Ann Sothern, Jack Haley	Columbia Pictures	Credited as Sam J. Briskin
1957	Strategic Air Command	Anthony Mann	James Stewart, June Allyson	Paramount Pictures	
1957	The Joker Is Wild	Albert S. Rogell	Frank Sinatra, Mitzi Gaynor, Jeanne Crain, Eddie Albert	Paramount Pictures	

== Personal life and death ==
One of Briskin's children, Gerald (Jerry), also became a producer in the film industry, working at the same company as his father, Columbia. He also followed his father into the armed services during World War II, becoming a sergeant in the Signal Corps. Through Jerry, Briskin became a grandfather on May 23, 1944. Briskin's wife's name was Sara, and they had one other child, a son named Bernard. Throughout his life Briskin was a well-known philanthropist, and was quite active in Temple Israel in Los Angeles, as well as Cedars-Sinai Hospital, where he served as president. On Halloween 1968 (October 31), Briskin had a major heart attack and was admitted in critical condition to the hospital. He died two weeks later on November 14, 1968, at UCLA Medical Center, where he was under treatment.
