= Ron Cavenall =

American retired basketball player

Personal information
- Born: April 30, 1959 (age 67) Beaumont, Texas, U.S.
- Listed height: 7 ft 1 in (2.16 m)
- Listed weight: 230 lb (104 kg)

Career information
- High school: Charlton-Pollard (Beaumont, Texas)
- College: Texas Southern (1977–1981)
- NBA draft: 1981: undrafted
- Playing career: 1983–1993
- Position: Center
- Number: 8, 40

Career history
- 1983: Sydney Supersonics
- 1983: Harlem Wizards
- 1983–1984: Washington Generals
- 1984–1985: New York Knicks
- 1986: Westchester Golden Apples
- 1986: Springfield Fame
- 1987–1988: Wyoming Wildcatters
- 1988: New Jersey Nets
- 1989: Cedar Rapids Silver Bullets
- 1989–1990: Quad City Thunder
- 1990: Sioux Falls Skyforce
- 1990: Yakima Sun Kings
- 1990–1991: Grand Rapids Hoops
- 1992: Capital Region Pontiacs
- 1992–1993: Columbus Horizon

Career highlights
- CBA blocks leader (1988)
- Stats at NBA.com
- Stats at Basketball Reference

Ronnie Goodall Cavenall (born April 30, 1959) is an American former basketball player who played briefly in the National Basketball Association (NBA), among other leagues.

== Career ==
Cavenall played college basketball for the Texas Southern Tigers, and went undrafted in the 1981 NBA draft as a senior. After playing for the Sydney Supersonics in the Australian National Basketball League, Cavenall returned to America to play with the Washington Generals, while also playing for the basketball show team Harlem Wizards. While playing for the Wizards, he caught the attention of Rick Pitino, who was then an assistant for the New York Knicks, who invited Cavenall to join the Knicks in the 1984 NBA Summer League. He made the team's final roster, playing in 53 games with 2 starts and averaging 1.8 points and 3.1 rebounds during 12.3 minutes of playing time in the 1984-85 NBA season.

Cavenall was not resigned by the Knicks at the end of the season. He spent the following few years playing for three teams in the CBA, before receiving another call-up to the NBA to play for the New Jersey Nets in 1988. Cavenall only played five games for the team in limited minutes, and was waived in December of that year.

He spent the rest of his career playing for various teams in the CBA, with his final season being in 1992–1993 with Columbus Horizon.

== Personal life ==
Cavenall currently lives in Houston, Texas.

== NBA career statistics ==
=== Regular season ===
Year	Team	GP	GS	MPG	FG%	3P%	FT%	RPG	APG	SPG	BPG	PPG
1984–85	New York	53	2	12.3	.326	.00	.564	3.1	.4	.2	.8	1.5
1988–89	New Jersey	5	0	3.2	.667	.000	.400	.4	.0	.0	.4	1.2
Career		58	2	11.5	.337	.000	.545	2.9	.3	.2	.8	1.4
