= Merry Christmas, George Bailey =

- Based on: The Greatest Gift by Philip Van Doren Stern
- Directed by: Matthew Diamond
- Starring: Bill Pullman; Penelope Ann Miller; Nathan Lane; Sally Field; Martin Landau
- Country of origin: United States
- Original language: English

Production
- Running time: 60 minutes

Original release
- Network: PBS
- Release: December 25, 1997

Merry Christmas, George Bailey is a 1997 television broadcast directed by Matthew Diamond and starring Bill Pullman, Penelope Ann Miller, Nathan Lane, Sally Field and Martin Landau. It is an adaptation of the 1946 film It's a Wonderful Life, which is based on the 1943 short story "The Greatest Gift" by Philip Van Doren Stern. Filmed live, it is a recreation of Lux Radio Theater's 1947 production of It's A Wonderful Life.

== Cast ==
- Bill Pullman as George Bailey
- Martin Landau as Pa Bailey/Mr. Potter
- Penelope Ann Miller as Mary Hatch Bailey
- Nathan Lane as Clarence
- Sally Field as George's mother
- Joe Mantegna as Nick the bartender
- Christian Slater as Harry/Sam Wainwright
- Minnie Driver as Violet Bick
- Jerry Van Dyke as Uncle Billy
- Carol Kane as Mary's mother
- Bronson Pinchot
- Robert Guillaume as Mr. Gower
- Mae Whitman as Zuzu

== See also ==
- List of Christmas television specials
