= It's a Wonderful Life =

1946 film by Frank Capra

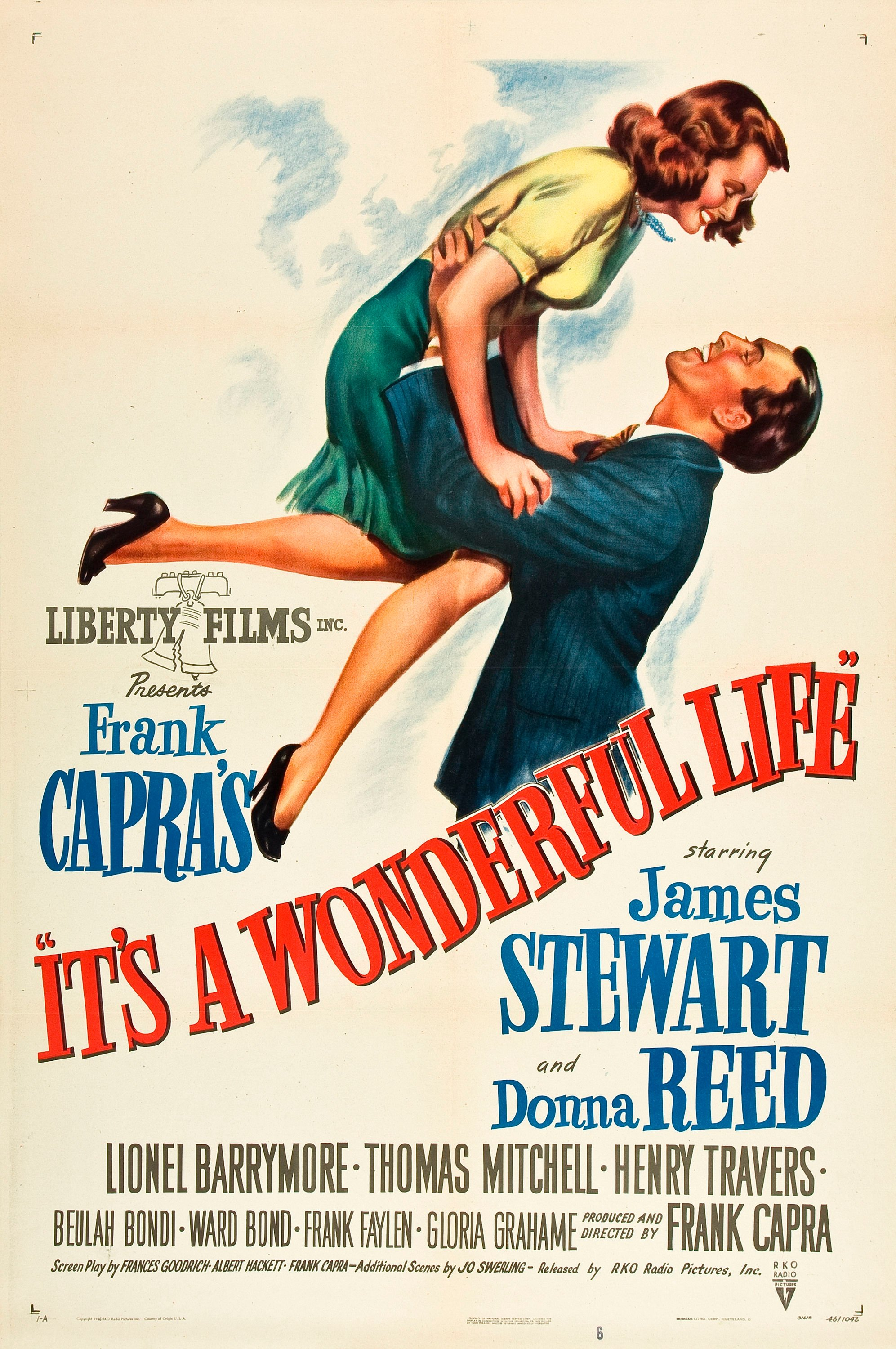
- Theatrical release poster
- Directed by: Frank Capra
- Screenplay by: Frances Goodrich; Albert Hackett; Frank Capra; Additional scenes: Jo Swerling
- Based on: "The Greatest Gift" by Philip Van Doren Stern
- Produced by: Frank Capra
- Starring: James Stewart; Donna Reed; Lionel Barrymore; Thomas Mitchell; Henry Travers; Beulah Bondi; Ward Bond; Frank Faylen; Gloria Grahame
- Cinematography: Joseph Walker; Joseph Biroc
- Edited by: William Hornbeck
- Music by: Dimitri Tiomkin
- Production company: Liberty Films
- Distributed by: RKO Radio Pictures
- Release date: December 20, 1946
- Running time: 131 minutes
- Country: United States
- Language: English
- Budget: $3.18 million (Note: The original budget had been set at $3 million.)
- Box office: $3.3 million

It's a Wonderful Life is a 1946 American Christmas fantasy drama film directed and produced by Frank Capra. It is based on the short story and booklet "The Greatest Gift", self-published by Philip Van Doren Stern in 1943, which itself is loosely based on the 1843 Charles Dickens novella A Christmas Carol.

The film stars James Stewart as George Bailey, a man who has given up his personal dreams to help others in his community and whose intended suicide on Christmas Eve brings about the intervention of his guardian angel, Clarence Odbody. Clarence shows George all the lives he touched and what the world would be like if he had not existed.

Although it was nominated for five Academy Awards, including Best Picture, It's a Wonderful Life initially received mixed reviews and was unsuccessful at the box office. Theatrically, the film's break-even point was $6.3 million, about twice the production cost, a figure it did not come close to achieving on its initial release. Because of the film's disappointing sales, Capra was seen by some studios as having lost his ability to produce popular, financially successful films. Its copyright in the U.S. expired in 1974 following a lack of renewal and it entered the public domain, allowing it to be broadcast without licensing or royalty fees, at which point it became a Christmas classic.

It's a Wonderful Life is now considered to be one of the greatest films of all time and among the best Christmas films. It has been recognized by the American Film Institute as one of the 100 best American films ever made. It was no. 11 on the American Film Institute's 1998 greatest movie list, no. 20 on its 2007 greatest movie list, no. 8 on its list of greatest love stories, and no. 1 on its list of the most inspirational American films of all time. In 1990, It's a Wonderful Life became one of 25 films selected for preservation in the United States National Film Registry by the Library of Congress for being deemed as "culturally, historically, or aesthetically significant". Capra revealed that it was his favorite among the films he directed and that he screened it for his family every Christmas season. It was one of Stewart's favorite films. A modern remake of the film, written and directed by Kenya Barris, is in development at Paramount Pictures as of January 2024.

== Plot ==
On Christmas Eve 1945, in Bedford Falls, New York, George Bailey contemplates suicide. The prayers of his family and friends reach Heaven, where guardian angel second class Clarence Odbody is assigned to save George to earn his wings. Clarence is shown flashbacks of George's life, beginning when 12-year-old George rescued his younger brother Harry from drowning in a frozen pond, leaving George deaf in his left ear. George later saves pharmacist Mr. Gower from accidentally poisoning a customer.

Before starting college, George plans a world tour. He is reintroduced to Mary Hatch, who has had a crush on him since childhood. When his father dies from a stroke, George postpones his travel to settle the family business, Bailey Brothers Building and Loan. Avaricious board member Henry F. Potter, who owns most of the town's businesses, seeks to dissolve the company, but the board of directors votes to keep it open if George runs it. George works alongside his uncle Billy and gives his tuition savings to Harry, with the understanding Harry will run the company when he graduates. When Harry returns from college married and with a job offer from his father-in-law, George resigns himself to running the Building and Loan. George and Mary rekindle their relationship and marry, but forego their honeymoon and use the money to keep the company solvent during a run on the bank. Under George, the company establishes Bailey Park, a housing development to compete with Potter's slums. Potter entices George with a high-paying job, but George rebuffs him when he realizes that Potter's goal is to close the Building and Loan.

On Christmas Eve, the town prepares a hero's welcome for Harry, a Navy fighter pilot awarded the Medal of Honor for preventing a kamikaze attack on a troopship. Billy goes to deposit $8,000 ($143,068 in 2025) of the Building and Loan's money in Potter's bank. He taunts Potter with a newspaper headline about Harry, but absentmindedly wraps the cash in Potter's newspaper. Potter keeps the money while Billy cannot recall how he misplaced it. While a bank examiner performs an audit, George fruitlessly retraces Billy's steps. Frustrated and angered by Billy's blunder, which may lead to scandal and jail, George resents the sacrifices he has made and the family that has kept him trapped in Bedford Falls. He appeals to Potter for a loan, but has only a meager life insurance policy for collateral. Potter scoffs that George is worth more dead than alive and, accusing him of bank fraud, phones the police.

George flees Potter's office, gets drunk at a bar and prays for help. Contemplating suicide, he goes to a bridge, but before he can jump, Clarence falls into the water below and George rescues him. When George wishes he had never been born, Clarence takes him into an alternate timeline in which he never existed and Bedford Falls is called Pottersville, an unsavory town occupied by sleazy entertainment venues and callous people. No one knows George, not even his mother and Mary, who is an "old maid". He learns that Uncle Billy was committed to an institution after the Building and Loan failed and Mr. Gower was jailed for manslaughter for poisoning the customer. George also discovers Harry's grave; without George to save him, Harry drowned as a child, and without Harry to save them, the troops aboard the transport were killed.

George races back to the bridge and begs Clarence, and then God, for his life back. His wish granted, he gleefully rushes home to await his arrest. Meanwhile, Mary and Billy have rallied the townspeople, who donate more than enough to replace the missing money. Harry arrives and toasts George as "the richest man in town". Among the donations is a gift from Clarence, The Adventures of Tom Sawyer, with the inscription, "Remember, no man is a failure who has friends. Thanks for the wings!" When a bell on their Christmas tree rings, George's youngest daughter, Zuzu, explains that "every time a bell rings, an angel gets his wings".

== Cast ==
- James Stewart as George Bailey
- Donna Reed as Mary Hatch Bailey
- Lionel Barrymore as Mr. Potter
- Thomas Mitchell as Uncle Billy
- Henry Travers as Clarence
- Samuel S. Hinds as Pa Bailey
- Beulah Bondi as Mrs. Bailey
- Todd Karns as Harry Bailey
- Frank Faylen as Ernie
- Ward Bond as Bert
- Gloria Grahame as Violet Bick
- H. B. Warner as Mr. Gower
- Frank Albertson as Sam Wainwright
- Mary Treen as Cousin Tilly
- Virginia Patton as Ruth Dakin
- Charles Williams as Cousin Eustace
- Sara Edwards as Mrs. Hatch
- Bill Edmunds as Mr. Martini
- Lillian Randolph as Annie
- Argentina Brunetti as Mrs. Martini
- Bobbie Anderson as Little George
- Ronnie Ralph as Little Sam
- Jean Gail as Little Mary
- Jeanine Ann Roose as Little Violet
- Danny Mummert as Little Marty Hatch
- Georgie Nokes as Little Harry Bailey
- Sheldon Leonard as Nick
- Frank Hagney as Potter's Bodyguard
- Ray Walker as Joe (Luggage Shop)
- Charlie Lane as Real Estate Salesman
- Edward Kean as Tom (Building & Loan)
- The Bailey Children
  - Carol Coomes as Janie
  - Karolyn Grimes as Zuzu
  - Larry Simms as Pete
  - Jimmy Hawkins as Tommy

Uncredited cast members include:

- Stanley Andrews as Mr. Welch, the teacher's husband
- Al Bridge as the sheriff with the arrest warrant against George
- Marian Carr as Jane Wainwright
- Adriana Caselotti as the singer at Martini's
- Ellen Corby as Miss Davis, a townswoman
- Dick Elliott as the bald man on his front porch
- Tom Fadden as the bridge tollhouse keeper
- Joseph Granby as the Angel Joseph (voice)
- Charles Halton as bank examiner Mr. Carter
- Harry Holman as high school principal Mr. Partridge
- Harold Landon as Marty Hatch
- J. Farrell MacDonald as the man whose great-grandfather planted the tree George drives into
- Moroni Olsen as the Senior Angel (voice)
- Mark Roberts as Mickey, the student with the swimming pool floor key
- Almira Sessions as Potter's secretary
- Carl "Alfalfa" Switzer as Freddie Othello, the student who tries to flirt with Mary
- Jimmy as Uncle Billy's pet raven

== Production ==
=== Background ===
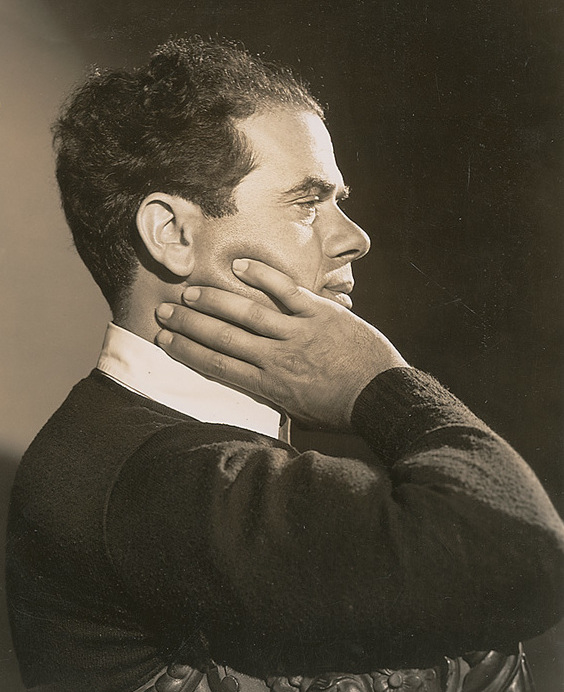
Director Frank Capra

The original story, "The Greatest Gift", was written by Philip Van Doren Stern in November 1939. After it was rejected by several publishers, he had it printed as a 24-page pamphlet and mailed to 200 family members and friends for Christmas 1943. (Note: It was not a true "Christmas card", but rather, a 24-page pamphlet.) The story came to the attention of either Cary Grant or RKO producer David Hempstead, who showed it to Grant's agent. In April 1944, RKO Pictures bought the rights to the story for $10,000, hoping to turn it into a vehicle for Grant.

Dalton Trumbo, Clifford Odets, and Marc Connelly each worked on versions of the screenplay before RKO shelved the project. In Trumbo's draft, George Bailey is an idealistic politician who grows more cynical as the story progresses, then tries to end his life after losing an election. The angel shows him Bedford Falls not as it would be if he had never been born, but if he had gone into business instead of politics. Grant went on to make another Christmas movie staple, The Bishop's Wife. (Note: The project went through many hands, including Howard Hughes', who reportedly was interested.)

RKO studio chief Charles Koerner urged Frank Capra to read "The Greatest Gift". Capra's new production company, Liberty Films, had a nine-film distribution agreement with RKO. Capra immediately saw its potential, and wanted it for his first Hollywood film after making documentaries and training films during the war. RKO sold Capra the rights for $10,000 and threw in the three earlier scripts for free. (However, Capra claimed the rights and the scripts cost him $50,000.) Capra salvaged a few scenes from Odets' earlier screenplay and worked with writers Frances Goodrich and Albert Hackett, Jo Swerling, Michael Wilson, and Dorothy Parker (brought in to "polish" the script), on many drafts of the screenplay.

It was not a harmonious collaboration. Goodrich called Capra "that horrid man" and recalled, "He couldn't wait to get writing it himself." Hackett, Goodrich's husband, said, "We told him what we were going to do, and he said 'That sounds fine.' We were trying to move the story along and work it out, and then somebody told us that [Capra] and Jo Swerling were working on it together, and that sort of took the guts out of it. Jo Swerling was a very close friend of ours, and when we heard he was doing this we felt rather bad about it. We were getting near the end and word came that Capra wanted to know how soon we'd be finished. So my wife said, 'We're finished right now.' We quickly wrote out the last scene and we never saw him again after that. He's a very arrogant son of a bitch."

Later, a dispute ensued over the writing credits. The final screenplay, renamed by Capra It's a Wonderful Life, was credited to Goodrich, Hackett, and Capra, with "additional scenes" by Jo Swerling. Capra said, "The Screen Writers' Arbitration committee decided that Hackett and Goodrich and I should get the credit for the writing. Jo Swerling hasn't talked to me since. That was five years ago."

Some in Seneca Falls, New York believe Capra was inspired to model Bedford Falls after the town following a visit in 1945. The town has an annual "It's a Wonderful Life Festival" on the second weekend in December. On December 10, 2010, the "It's a Wonderful Life" Museum opened in Seneca Falls, with Karolyn Grimes, who played Zuzu in the movie, cutting the ribbon. However, film historian Jeanine Basinger, curator of the Frank Capra archives at Wesleyan University and author of The 'It's A Wonderful Life' Book, has said no evidence exists for Seneca Falls' claim. "I have been through every piece of paper in Frank Capra's diaries, his archives, everything. There's no evidence of any sort whatsoever to support this. That doesn't mean it isn't true, but no one is ever going to prove it." Basinger said that Capra always described Bedford Falls as an "Everytown".

Philip Van Doren Stern said in a 1946 interview, "Incidentally, the movie takes place in Westchester County. Actually, the town I had in mind was Califon, N.J.." The historic iron bridge in Califon is similar to the bridge that George Bailey considered jumping from in the movie.

=== Casting ===
Trailer for the film

In his autobiography, Capra recalled: "Of all actors' roles I believe the most difficult is the role of a Good Sam who doesn't know that he is a Good Sam. I knew one man who could play it ... James Stewart. ... I spoke to Lew Wasserman, the MCA agent who handled Jimmy, told him I wanted to tell Jimmy the story. Wasserman said Stewart would gladly play the part without hearing the story." Stewart and Capra had previously collaborated on You Can't Take It with You (1938) and Mr. Smith Goes to Washington (1939).

Henry Fonda, Stewart's best friend, was also considered. Both actors had returned from the war with no employment prospects. Fonda, however, was cast in John Ford's My Darling Clementine (1946), which was filmed at the same time that Capra shot It's a Wonderful Life. For 17 supporting roles in the film, Capra considered more than 170 established actors.

Jean Arthur, Stewart's co-star in You Can't Take It With You and Mr. Smith Goes to Washington, was first offered the role of Mary, but had recently dropped out of the Broadway show Born Yesterday from exhaustion shortly before its premiere. Capra next considered Olivia de Havilland, Martha Scott, Ann Dvorak, and Ginger Rogers before borrowing Donna Reed from MGM. Rogers turned it down because she considered it "too bland". In chapter 26 of her autobiography Ginger: My Story. she questioned her decision by asking her readers: "Foolish, you say?"

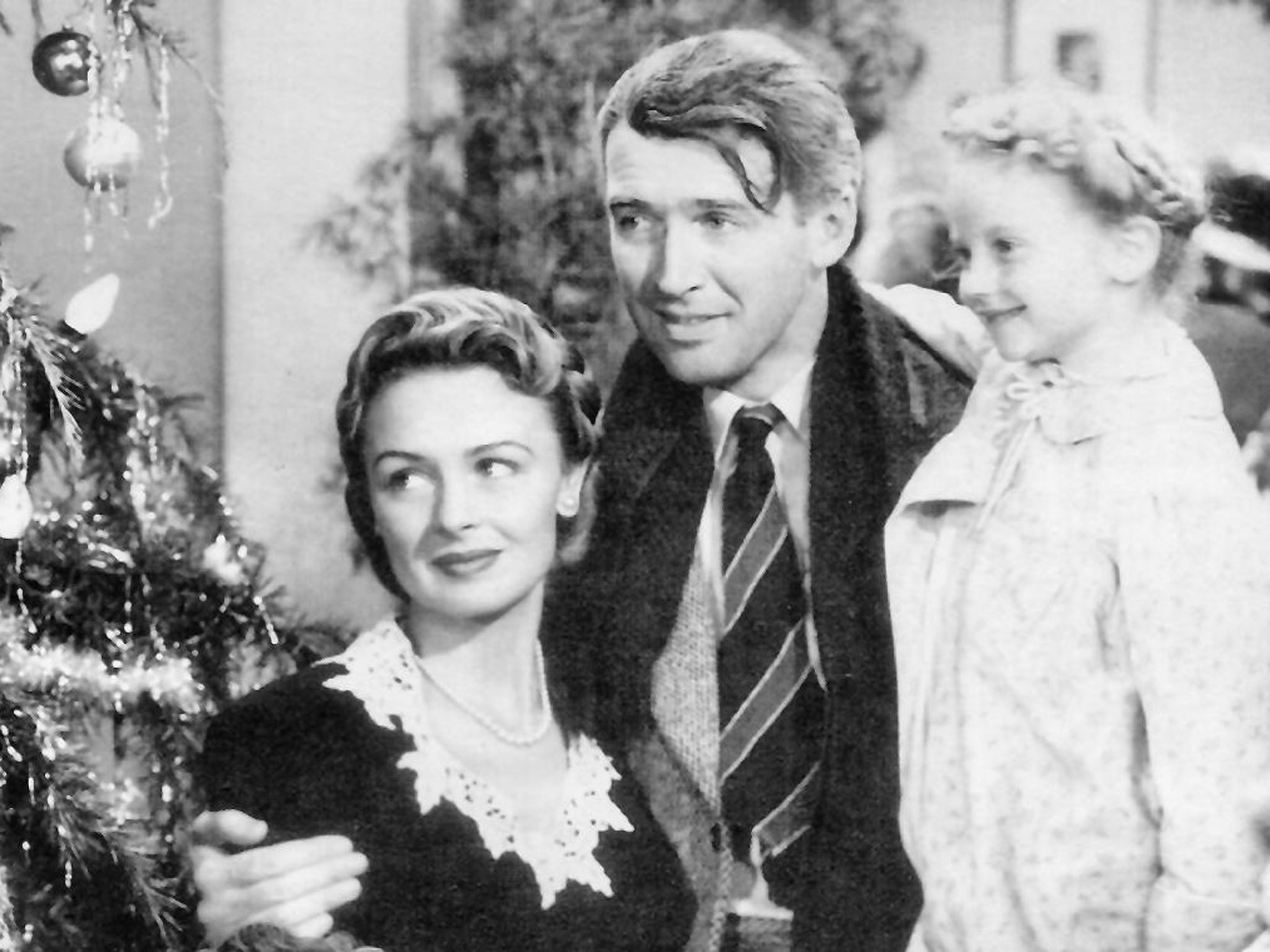
George Bailey (James Stewart), Mary Bailey (Donna Reed), and their youngest daughter Zuzu (Karolyn Grimes)

A long list of actors was considered for the role of Potter (originally named Herbert Potter): Edward Arnold, Charles Bickford, Edgar Buchanan, Louis Calhern, Victor Jory, Raymond Massey, Thomas Mitchell, and Vincent Price. Lionel Barrymore, who eventually was cast, was a famous Ebenezer Scrooge in radio dramatizations of A Christmas Carol at the time, and was a natural choice for the role. Barrymore also worked with Capra and Stewart on Capra's 1938 Best Picture Oscar winner, You Can't Take It with You.

Before Capra cast Ward Bond as Bert, he also considered Sam Levene, Barton MacLane, Robert Mitchum, John Alexander and Irving Bacon for the role.

Before Capra cast Thomas Mitchell as Uncle Billy, he also considered Walter Brennan and W. C. Fields for the role.

H. B. Warner, who was cast as Mr. Gower, the pharmacist, had studied medicine before going into acting. He was also in some of Capra's other films, including Mr. Deeds Goes to Town, Lost Horizon, You Can't Take It with You, and Mr. Smith Goes to Washington. In the silent era, he had played the role of Jesus Christ in Cecil B. DeMille's The King of Kings (1927). The name Gower came from Capra's employer Columbia Pictures, which had been located on Gower Street for many years. Also on Gower Street was a drugstore that was a favorite for the studio's employees.

Charles Williams, who was cast as Eustace Bailey, and Mary Treen, who was cast as Matilda "Tilly" Bailey, were both B-list actors, having appeared in 90 films each before It's a Wonderful Life.

Jimmy the raven (Uncle Billy's pet) appeared in You Can't Take It with You and each subsequent Capra film.

=== Filming ===
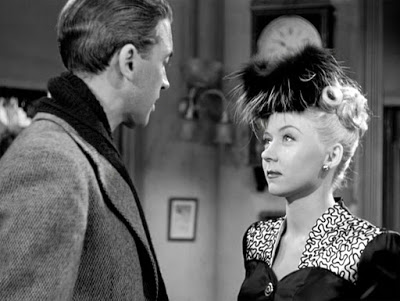
James Stewart and Gloria Grahame as George Bailey and Violet Bick

It's a Wonderful Life was shot at RKO Radio Pictures Studios in Culver City, California, and the 89-acre RKO movie ranch in Encino, where "Bedford Falls" was adapted from Oscar-winning sets originally designed by art director Max Ree for the 1931 epic film Cimarron. Covering 4 acres (1.6 ha), the town consisted of a main street stretching 300 yards (three city blocks) with 75 stores and buildings, and a residential neighborhood. Capra added a tree-lined center parkway, built a working bank set, and planted 20 full-grown oak trees. Pigeons, cats, and dogs were allowed to roam the mammoth set to give the "town" a lived-in feel.

Due to the requirements of filming in an "alternate reality", as well as different seasons, the exterior set was extremely adaptable. RKO studio's head of special effects, Russell Shearman, developed a new compound using water, soap flakes, foamite, and sugar to create "chemical snow" for the film. Before then, movie snow was usually made from untoasted cornflakes, which were so loud when stepped on that dialogue had to be redubbed afterwards.

Filming started on April 15, 1946, and wrapped on July 27, 1946, exactly on deadline for the 90-day principal photography schedule.

The angelic figures depicted at the beginning of the film is an image of Stephan's Quintet, a group of five interacting galaxies.

Only two locations from the film survive. The first, the swimming pool that was unveiled during the high-school dance sequence, is located in the gymnasium at Beverly Hills High School and was still in use as of December 2023. The second is the "Martini home" in La Cañada Flintridge, California. RKO's movie ranch in Encino was razed in 1954. (Note: Photographs of parts of the RKO set can be seen on retroweb.com.)

The scene where young George saves his brother Harry from drowning was different in an early draft of the script. The boys play ice hockey on the river (which is on Potter's property) as Potter watches with disdain. George shoots the puck, but it goes astray and breaks the "No Trespassing" sign and lands in Potter's yard. Potter becomes irate and his gardener releases attack dogs, which cause the boys to flee. Harry falls in the ice and George saves him with the same results.

In another draft, after he unsuccessfully attempts to consult his father about Mr. Gower and the pills, George considers asking Uncle Billy, but he is on the phone with the bank examiner. Billy lights his cigar and throws his match in the wastebasket. George turns to Tilly (who, along with Eustace, are his cousins, although not Billy's kids), but she is on the phone with her friend, Martha. She says, "Potter's here, the bank examiner's coming. It's a day of judgment." The wastebasket suddenly catches fire and Billy cries for help. Tilly runs in and puts the fire out with a pot of coffee. George decides to deal with the Gower situation by himself.

According to Bobbie Anderson, who played young George, was slapped for real by H. B. Warner (who played Mr. Gower and whose character was drunk in the scene) and made his ear bleed, reducing him to tears. Warner hugged him after the scene was shot.

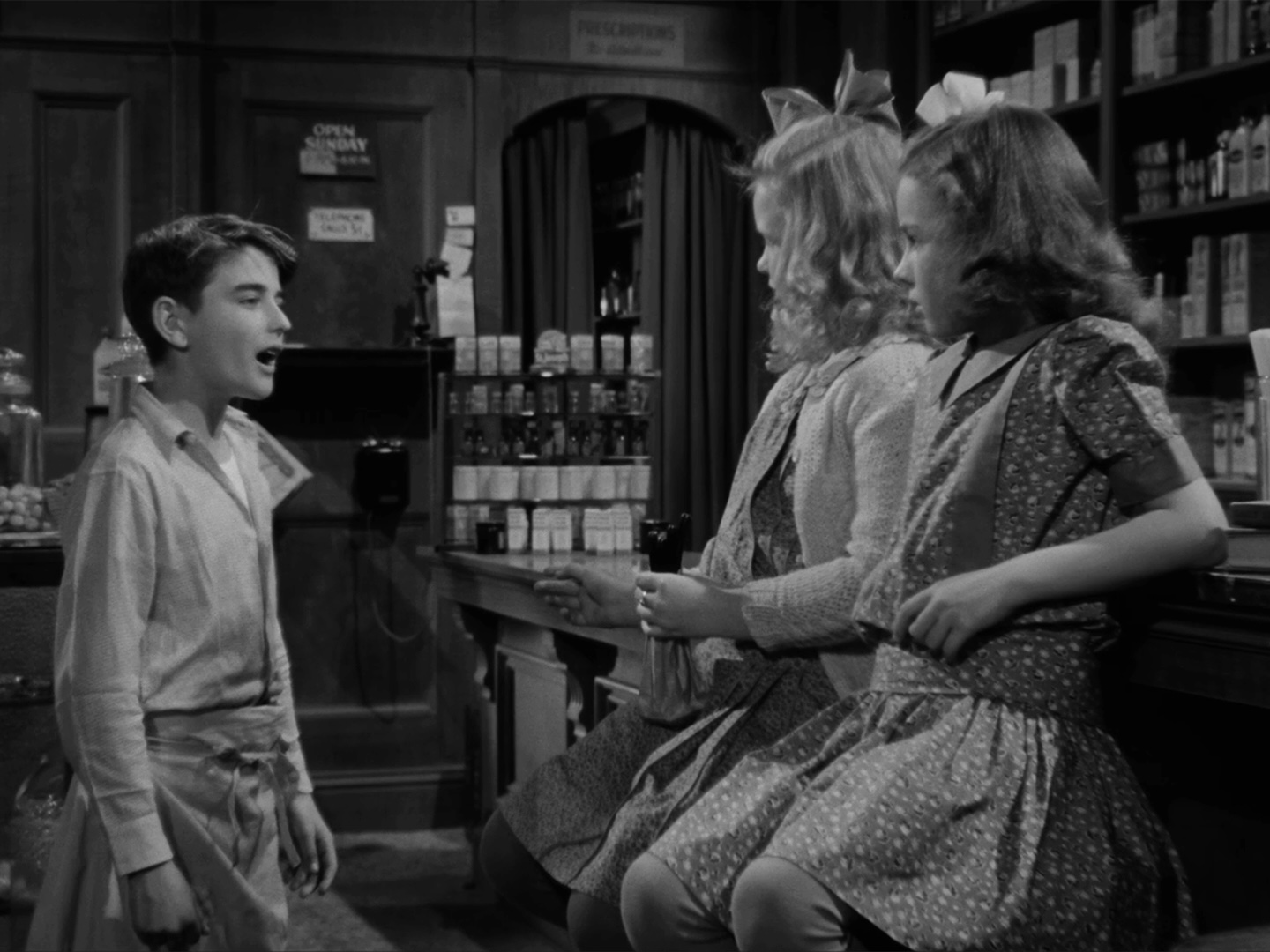
Young George (Bobbie Anderson) with Violet and Mary in Mr. Gower's drugstore

Composer Dimitri Tiomkin had written "Death Telegram" and "Gower's Deliverance" for the drugstore sequence, but Capra elected to forgo music in those scenes. Tiomkin had worked on many of Capra's previous films, but those changes, and others, led to a falling out between the two men. Tiomkin felt as though his work was being seen as a mere suggestion. In his autobiography Please Don't Hate Me, he called the incident, "an all around scissors job".

In the scene where Uncle Billy gets drunk at Harry and Ruth's welcome home/newlyweds' party and staggers away off camera, a crash is heard off screen. Mitchell, as Uncle Billy, yells, "I'm all right! I'm all right!", implying that Uncle Billy had knocked into some trash cans. A technician had actually knocked over some equipment; Capra left in Mitchell's impromptu ad lib and rewarded the technician with $10 (equal to $141.84 in 2021), thanking him for his 'sound improvement'.

According to rare stills that have been unearthed, several sequences were filmed but subsequently cut. Alternative endings were also considered. Capra's first script had Bailey fall to his knees to recite "The Lord's Prayer" (the script also called for an opening scene with the townspeople in prayer). Feeling that an overly religious tone undermined the emotional impact of the family and friends rushing to George's rescue, the closing scenes were rewritten.

Capra found the film's original cinematographer Victor Milner slow and pretentious, and when Milner became ill, Capra borrowed Joseph Walker from Columbia. Walker had lensed 19 previous Capra films. But when Rosalind Russell demanded that Walker return to Columbia Pictures to shoot her next film, Walker trained veteran camera operator Joseph Biroc to be his replacement. Although working with three cinematographers was difficult for Capra, in Walker's opinion it turned out very well because the scenes each cinematographer shot were so different that they did not have to match each other's visual styles.

== Reception ==
=== Critical response ===
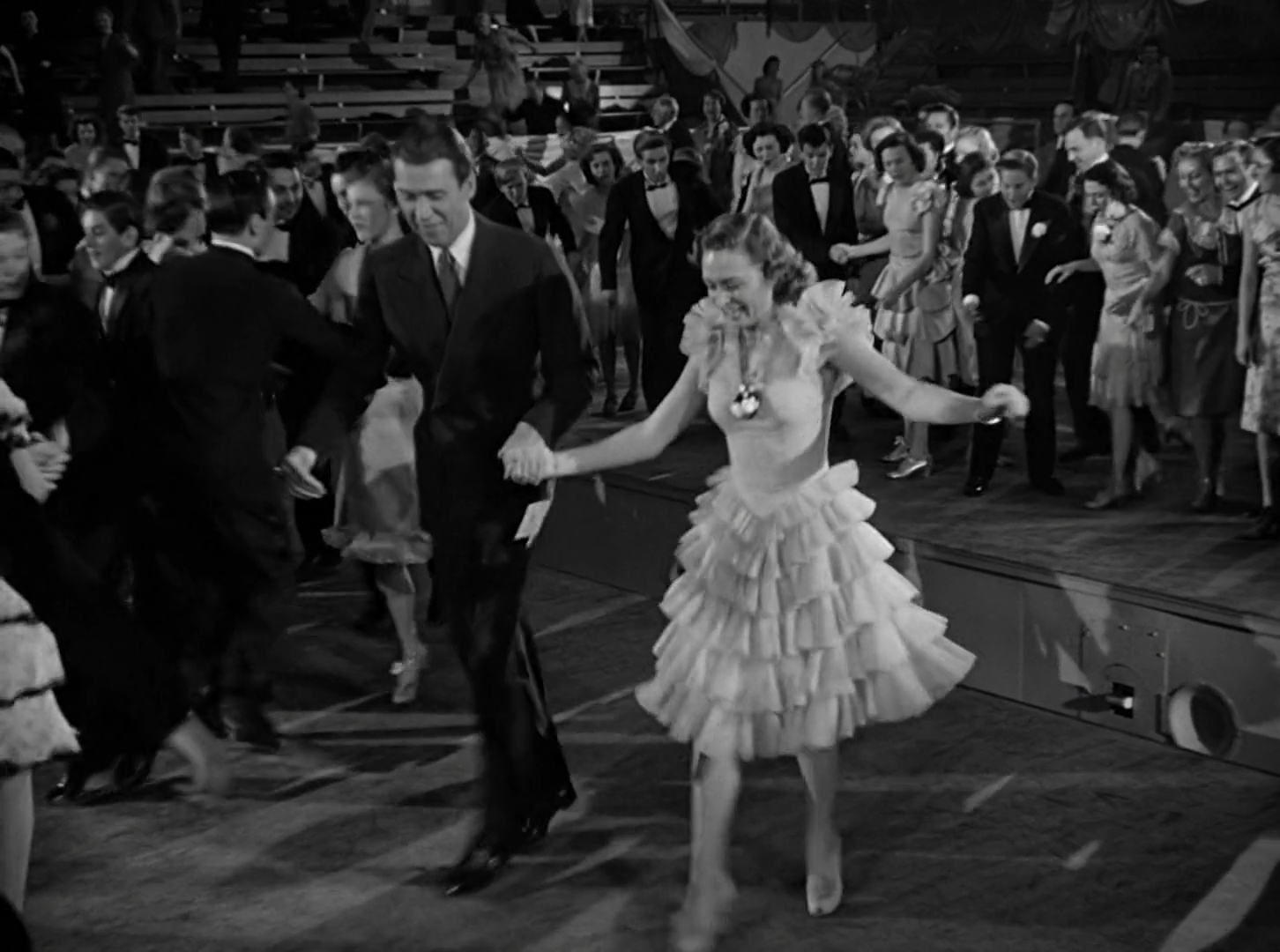
George and Mary dancing near the opening in the floor in the film's high school gym (filmed at Beverly Hills High School)

According to a 2006 book, "A spate of movies appeared just after the ending of the Second World War, including It's a Wonderful Life (1946) and Stairway to Heaven (1946), perhaps tapping into so many people's experience of loss of loved ones and offering a kind of consolation." It's a Wonderful Life premiered at the Globe Theatre in New York City on December 20, 1946, to mixed reviews. While Capra thought the contemporary critical reviews were either universally negative, or at best dismissive, Time said, "It's a Wonderful Life is a pretty wonderful movie. It has only one formidable rival (Goldwyn's The Best Years of Our Lives) as Hollywood's best picture of the year. Director Capra's inventiveness, humor, and affection for human beings keep it glowing with life and excitement."

In his review for Variety, Bert Briller wrote, "It's a Wonderful Life will enjoy just that at the b.o. [box office], and eminently deserves to do so." He added: "Capra may not have taken here the stride forward in film-making technique he achieved in It Happened One Night, but no past Capra celluloid possessed any greater or more genuine qualities of effectiveness." Briller praised Reed's performance, writing, "In femme lead, Donna Reed will reach full-fledged stardom with this effort."

Bosley Crowther, writing for The New York Times, complimented some of the actors, including Stewart and Reed, but concluded, "the weakness of this picture, from this reviewer's point of view, is the sentimentality of it—its illusory concept of life. Mr. Capra's nice people are charming, his small town is a quite beguiling place and his pattern for solving problems is most optimistic and facile. But somehow, they all resemble theatrical attitudes, rather than average realities."

Writing in The Nation in 1946, critic James Agee stated, " ... Frank Capra's first film since those he made for the army, is one of the most efficient sentimental pieces since A Christmas Carol. Often, in its pile-driving emotional exuberance, it outrages, insults, or at least accosts without introduction, the cooler and more responsible parts of the mind; it is nevertheless recommended. ... "

The film, which went into general release on January 7, 1947, placed 26th ($3.3 million) in box-office revenues for 1947 (out of more than 400 features released), one place ahead of another Christmas film, Miracle on 34th Street. The film was supposed to be released in January 1947, but was moved up to December 1946 to make it eligible for the 19th Academy Awards held in March 1947. This move was seen as worse for the film, as 1947 did not have quite the stiff competition as 1946. If it had entered the 1947 awards, its strongest competitor would have been Miracle on 34th Street. The number-one grossing movie of 1947, The Best Years of Our Lives, made $11.5 million.

The film recorded a loss of $525,000 at the box office for RKO.

On May 26, 1947, the Federal Bureau of Investigation issued a memo stating, "With regard to the picture It's a Wonderful Life, [redacted name] stated in substance that the film represented rather obvious attempts to discredit bankers by casting Lionel Barrymore as a 'scrooge-type' so that he would be the most hated man in the picture. This, according to these sources, is a common trick used by Communists. [In] addition, [redacted name] stated that, in his opinion, this picture deliberately maligned the upper class, attempting to show the people who had money were mean and despicable characters." Film historian Andrew Sarris observed as "curious" that "the censors never noticed that the villainous Mr. Potter gets away with robbery without being caught or punished in any way".

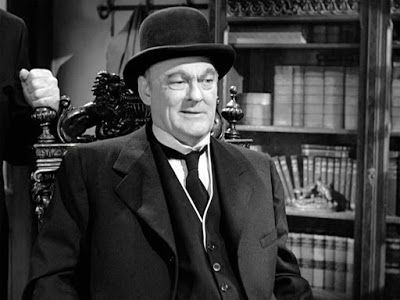
Henry Potter (Lionel Barrymore) was placed in AFI's 100 Years ... 100 Heroes & Villains as number six of villains, while George Bailey was voted number 9 of heroes.

In 1990, It's a Wonderful Life was deemed "culturally, historically, or aesthetically significant" by the United States Library of Congress and selected for preservation in their National Film Registry.

In 2002, Channel 4 in the United Kingdom ranked It's a Wonderful Life as the seventh-greatest film ever made in its poll "The 100 Greatest Films". The channel airs the film to British viewers annually on Christmas Eve.

In June 2008, AFI revealed its 10 Top 10, the best 10 films in 10 "classic" American film genres, after polling over 1,500 people from the creative community. It's a Wonderful Life was acknowledged as the third-best film in the fantasy genre.

Somewhat more iconoclastic views of the film and its contents are occasionally expressed. In his review for The New Republic in 1947, film critic Manny Farber wrote, "To make his points, [Capra] always takes an easy, simple-minded path that doesn't give much credit to the intelligence of the audience", and adds that it has only a "few unsentimental moments here and there". (Note: "Mugging Main Street" was reprinted in Farber on Film, Library of America, 2009, pp. 307–309.) Wendell Jamieson, in a 2008 article for The New York Times which was generally positive in its analysis of the film, observed that far from being simply a sweetly sentimental tale, It's a Wonderful Life "is a terrifying, asphyxiating story about growing up and relinquishing your dreams, of seeing your father driven to the grave before his time, of living among bitter, small-minded people. It is a story of being trapped, of compromising, of watching others move ahead and away, of becoming so filled with rage that you verbally abuse your children, their teacher, and your oppressively perfect wife."

... one of the most profoundly pessimistic tales of human existence ever to achieve a lasting popularity.

— Film historian Andrew Sarris in "You Ain't Heard Nothin' Yet": The American Talking Film History & Memory, 1927–1949.

In a 2010 essay for Salon, Richard Cohen described It's a Wonderful Life as "the most terrifying Hollywood film ever made". In the "Pottersville" sequence, he wrote, George Bailey is not seeing the world that would exist had he never been born, but rather "the world as it does exist, in his time and also in our own". Nine years earlier, another Salon writer, Gary Kamiya, had expressed the opposing view that "Pottersville rocks!", adding: "The gauzy, Currier-and-Ives veil Capra drapes over Bedford Falls has prevented viewers from grasping what a tiresome and, frankly, toxic environment it is ... We all live in Pottersville now."

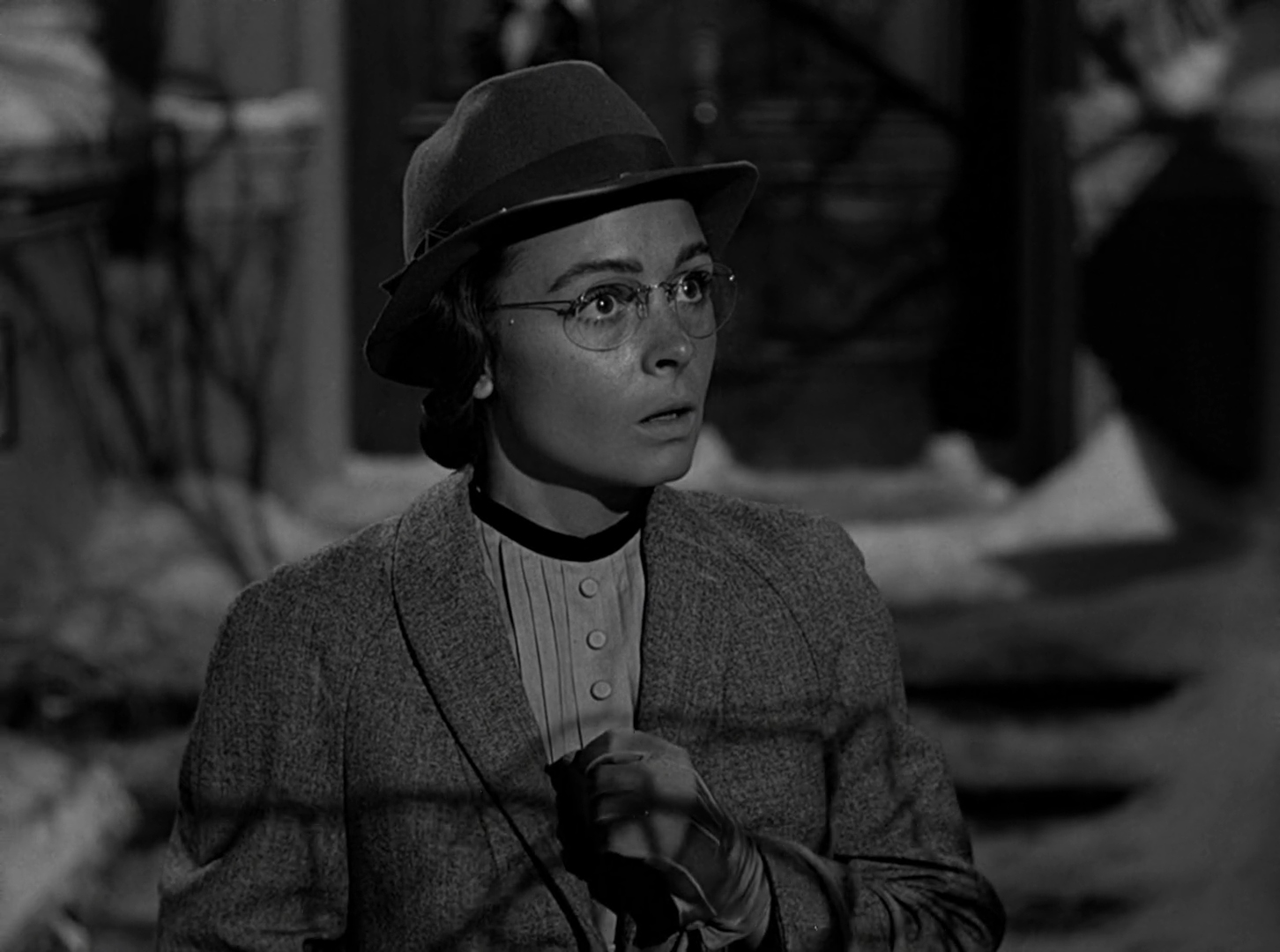
Mary Hatch (Donna Reed), spinster librarian, in the world where George Bailey was never born

The film's elevation to the status of a beloved classic came three decades after its initial release, when it became a television staple during Christmas season in 1976. This came as a welcome surprise to Frank Capra and others involved with its production. "It's the damnedest thing I've ever seen", Capra told The Wall Street Journal in 1984. "The film has a life of its own now, and I can look at it like I had nothing to do with it. I'm like a parent whose kid grows up to be President. I'm proud ... but it's the kid who did the work. I didn't even think of it as a Christmas story when I first ran across it. I just liked the idea." In a 1946 interview, Capra described the film's theme as "the individual's belief in himself" and that he made it "to combat a modern trend toward atheism". It ranked 283rd among critics, and 107th among directors, in the 2012 Sight & Sound polls of the greatest films ever made.

The film's positive reception has continued. On review aggregator Rotten Tomatoes, the film holds an approval rating of 94% based on 97 reviews, with an average rating of 9.0/10. The website's critical consensus reads, "The holiday classic to define all holiday classics, It's a Wonderful Life is one of a handful of films worth an annual viewing." On Metacritic, the film has a score 89 out of 100, based on 17 critics, indicating "universal acclaim".

Many filmmakers have praised the film, including Steven Spielberg, Akira Kurosawa, Frank Darabont, David Lynch, Don Hertzfeldt, and Guillermo del Toro. Spielberg once said of the film: "It's a Wonderful Life shows that every human being on this Earth matters – and that's a very powerful message." He ranked the film first on his list of 20 favorite films. Orson Welles played Mr. Potter in the made-for-television remake It Happened One Christmas; when asked by Henry Jaglom what he thought of the movie, Welles said, "There's no way of hating that movie."

== Awards and honors ==
Prior to its Los Angeles release, Liberty Films mounted an extensive promotional campaign that included a daily advertisement highlighting one of the film's players, along with comments from reviewers. Jimmy Starr wrote, "If I were an Oscar, I'd elope with It's a Wonderful Life lock, stock and barrel on the night of the Academy Awards". The New York Daily Times published an editorial that declared the film and James Stewart's performance to be worthy of Academy Award consideration.

It's a Wonderful Life received five Academy Award nominations:

Year	Award	Result	Nominee / Winner
1946	Best Picture	Nominated	Liberty Films; Lost to Samuel Goldwyn Productions – The Best Years of Our Lives
1946	Best Director	Nominated	Frank Capra; Lost to William Wyler – The Best Years of Our Lives
1946	Best Actor	Nominated	James Stewart; Lost to Fredric March – The Best Years of Our Lives
1946	Best Film Editing	Nominated	William Hornbeck; Lost to Daniel Mandell – The Best Years of Our Lives
1946	Best Sound Recording	Nominated	John Aalberg; Lost to John P. Livadary – The Jolson Story

The Best Years of Our Lives, a drama about servicemen attempting to return to their pre-World War II lives, won most of the awards that year, including four of the five for which It's a Wonderful Life was nominated. (The award for "Best Sound Recording" was won by The Jolson Story.) The Best Years of Our Lives, directed by William Wyler, Capra's business partner along with George Stevens in Liberty Films, was also an outstanding commercial success, ultimately becoming the highest-grossing film of the decade, in contrast to the more modest initial box-office returns of It's a Wonderful Life.

It's a Wonderful Life received a Golden Globe Award for Capra as Best Motion Picture Director. He also won a "CEC Award" from the Cinema Writers Circle in Spain, for Mejor Película Extranjera (Best Foreign Film). Jimmy Hawkins won a "Former Child Star Lifetime Achievement Award" from the Young Artist Awards in 1994; the award recognized his role as Tommy Bailey as igniting his career, which lasted until the mid-1960s.

The film was included by the Vatican in a list of important films compiled in 1995, under the category of "Values". In November 2025, the film was included in a list released by the Vatican of Pope Leo XIV's favorite films.

In 2006, Writers Guild of America West ranked its screenplay 20th in WGA's list of 101 Greatest Screenplays. The February 2020 issue of New York Magazine lists It's a Wonderful Life as among "The Best Movies That Lost Best Picture at the Oscars".

== Release ==
=== Ownership and copyright issues ===
After being acquired by Paramount Pictures and becoming its subsidiary, Liberty Films closed in 1951. Four years later, Paramount sold the film rights to independent distributor M. & A. Alexander.

The acquisition by the aforementioned distributor included key rights to the original television syndication, the original nitrate film elements, the music score, and the film rights to the story on which the film is based, "The Greatest Gift". (Note: Capra's re-editing of the original score by Dimitri Tiomkin was restored to the Tiomkin version by Willard Carroll in the 1980s and released on a CD in 1988.) National Telefilm Associates (NTA) took over the rights to the film soon thereafter.

A clerical error at NTA prevented the copyright from being renewed properly in 1974. Despite the lapsed copyright, television stations that aired it still had to pay royalties because—though the film's images had entered the public domain—the film's story was still restricted as a derivative work of the published story "The Greatest Gift", the copyright of which Philip Van Doren Stern had renewed in 1971. (Note: The United States copyright of "The Greatest Gift" will expire in 2038, 95 years after its publication.)

The film became a perennial holiday favorite in the 1980s, possibly due to its repeated showings each holiday season on hundreds of local television stations. It was mentioned during the deliberations on the Copyright Term Extension Act of 1998.

In 1993, Republic Pictures, which was the successor to NTA, relied on the 1990 U.S. Supreme Court ruling in Stewart v. Abend (which involved another Stewart film, Rear Window) to enforce its claim to the copyright. While the film's copyright had not been renewed, Republic claimed to own the film rights to "The Greatest Gift"; thus, the plaintiffs were able to argue its status as a derivative work of a work still under copyright. With Viacom's acquisition of Republic Pictures in the 90s, this led to Paramount Pictures apparently owning the film again since its acquisition of Liberty Films. However Philip Stern's estate claims that Republic Pictures never obtained the rights to the story and that they still own them, thus making the claim illegal and leaving them with the grounds to sue.

That year, Republic made a deal with Turner Broadcasting System, authorizing only three airings of the movie, all on cable's TNT and TBS. However, the studio's attempt to reassert control was widely ignored since there were still some existing distribution deals that Republic had to honor.

In 1994, the studio sold exclusive television rights to NBC. "We're thrilled that we will have the opportunity to broadcast this picture", said NBC Entertainment President Warren Littlefield at the time. "We will broadcast the original director's cut in black and white, full-length, the way Frank Capra intended this picture to be seen." NBC traditionally shows the film on Christmas Eve. It had, for a time in the late 1990s, aired the film on Thanksgiving but removed that airing due to low ratings and began airing the National Dog Show instead.

Alternate cuts have been made by other studios to take advantage of the film's unique status in the public domain. In 2020, Legend Films made an abridged cut of the film for Rifftrax that removed the Pottersville segment completely which they later released sans commentary the following year. Another rescored version also appeared on streaming services such as Plex.

=== Colorization ===
Capra met with Wilson Markle about having Colorization Inc. colorize It's a Wonderful Life based on an enthusiastic response to the colorization of Topper from actor Cary Grant. The company's art director, Brian Holmes, prepared 10 minutes of colorized footage from It's a Wonderful Life for Capra to view, which resulted in Capra signing a contract with Colorization Inc., and his "enthusiastic agree[ment] to pay half the $260,000 cost of colorizing the movie and to share any profits" and giving "preliminary approval to making similar color versions of two of his other black-and-white films, Meet John Doe (1941) and Lady for a Day (1933)".

However, the film was believed to be in the public domain at the time, and as a result, Markle and Holmes responded by returning Capra's initial investment, eliminating his financial participation, and refusing outright to allow the director to exercise artistic control over the colorization of his films, leading Capra to join in the campaign against the process.

Three colorized versions have been produced. The first was released by Hal Roach Studios in 1986. The second was authorized and produced by the film's permanent owner, Republic Pictures, in 1989. Both Capra and Stewart took a critical stand on the colorized editions. The Hal Roach color version was re-released in 1989 to VHS via Video Treasures. A third, computer-colorized version was produced by Legend Films in 2007 and has been released on DVD, Blu-ray, and streaming services.

=== 80th Anniversary Re-Release ===
Paramount Pictures (the studio that absorbed Republic Pictures and Liberty Films) has announced that It's a Wonderful Life will return to UK cinemas in 4K for a two-week run, beginning December 11, 2026, to celebrate the film's 80th anniversary.

In parallel, Paramount Home Entertainment has also released a limited-edition, 4K-remastered version of the film as a Deluxe Gift Set, available on DVD and Blu-ray.

== Home media ==
=== VHS and LaserDisc ===
Throughout the 1980s and early 1990s, when the film was still thought to be public domain, It's a Wonderful Life was released on VHS by a variety of home video companies. Among the companies that released the film on home video before Republic Pictures stepped in were Meda Video (which would later become Media Home Entertainment), Kartes Video Communications (under its Video Film Classics label), GoodTimes Home Video, and Video Treasures (now Anchor Bay Entertainment). After Republic reclaimed the rights to the film, all unofficial VHS copies of the film still in the hands of video distributors were supposed to have been destroyed. On September 17, 1996, a 50th anniversary LaserDisc was released by Republic Pictures Home Video.

Artisan Entertainment (under license from Republic) took over home video rights in the late 1990s. Artisan was later sold to Lions Gate Entertainment, which continued to hold US home video rights until late 2005, when they reverted to Paramount, which also owns video rights throughout Region 4 (Latin America and Australia) and in France. Video rights in the rest of the world are held by different companies; for example, the UK rights were once with Universal Studios, but have since reverted to Paramount.

==== Technological first: CD-ROM ====
In 1993, due in part to the confusion of the ownership and copyright issues, Kinesoft Development, with the support of Republic Pictures, released It's a Wonderful Life as one of the first commercial feature-length films on CD-ROM for the Windows PC (Windows 3.1). Predating commercial DVDs by several years, it included such features as the ability to follow along with the complete shooting script as the film was playing. (Note: Voyager Company's Hard Day's Night, released in May 1993, slightly predated the Kinesoft product. It was originally advertised as an audio CD.)

Given the state of video playback on the PC at the time of its release, It's a Wonderful Life for Windows represented another milestone, as the longest-running video on a computer. Prior to its release, Windows could play back only about 32,000 frames of video, or about 35 minutes at 15 frames per second. Working with Microsoft, Kinesoft was able to enhance the video features of Windows to allow for the complete playback of the entire film—all of this on a PC with a 486SX processor and 8 MB of RAM.

Computer Gaming World said in April 1994, "The picture quality still has a way to go before it reaches television standards", but was "a noble effort" that would "please fans of the film".

=== DVD and Blu-ray ===
The film has seen multiple DVD releases since the format became available in 1996–97. In 2001, the Brisbane-based Magna Pacific released it in Australia, followed by MRA Entertainment in 2004. Republic issued the film twice in 2002: once in August and again with different packaging in September. On October 31, 2006, Paramount released a newly remastered "60th Anniversary Edition". On November 13, 2007, Paramount released a two-disc "Special Edition" DVD containing both the original theatrical black-and-white version and a new colorized version produced by Legend Films using advanced colorization technology. On November 3, 2009, Paramount re-released the previous DVD set as a "Collector's Edition" and debuted a Blu-ray edition, both including the black-and-white and colorized versions of the film.

=== 2017 restoration ===
In 2017, the film was restored in 4K resolution, available via streaming services and DCP.

=== Abridged version ===
An abridged version of the film was released in 2021 by Legend Films with 24½ minutes removed. The entire scene of George in the alternate Pottersville is excised and as a result, drastically changes the ending of the film. This abridged version is the result of removing the scene based on "The Greatest Gift" by Philip Van Doren Stern, which has a different copyright than the film itself, allowing the film to be a rights-free version for full access to the public domain.

=== Soundtrack albums ===
On November 18, 1997, Dimitri Tiomkin's score was released by Nick at Nite Records. This was a label for the Nick at Nite block on the Nickelodeon channel, which was owned by Viacom, the company that acquired the rights to the film the following year. For the film's 75th anniversary, the soundtrack was re-released by Paramount's own in-house label Paramount Music on December 3, 2021. This release was done in association with La-La Land Records.

== Adaptations in other media ==
The film was twice adapted for radio in 1947, first on Lux Radio Theater (March 10) and then on the Screen Guild Theater (December 29), then again on the Screen Guild Theater broadcast of March 15, 1951. James Stewart and Donna Reed reprised their roles for all three radio productions. Stewart also starred in a May 8, 1949, radio adaptation presented on the Screen Directors Playhouse.

A stage adaptation written by American playwright Joe Landry, presented through the framing device of a live radio broadcast in the 1940s, premiered at Stamford Center for the Arts in 1996 and has since received numerous professional productions. According to the Educational Theatre Association, this adaptation was the third most produced full-length play in U.S. high schools from 2020 to 2021.

A musical stage adaptation of the film, titled It's a Wonderful Life – The Musical, was written by Bruce Greer and Keith Ferguson. This version premiered at the Majestic Theatre, Dallas, Texas, in 1998. It was an annual Christmas show at the theater for five years. It has since been performed at other venues around the United States.

In July 2019, it was revealed that another stage musical adaptation was in development with music and lyrics by Paul McCartney (making his musical theater debut), lyrics and book by Lee Hall and produced by Bill Kenwright. The musical was set to debut in late 2020 but is yet to premiere.

In 1997, PBS aired Merry Christmas, George Bailey, taped from a live performance of the 1947 Lux Radio Theatre script at the Pasadena Playhouse. The presentation, which benefited the Elizabeth Glaser Pediatric AIDS Foundation, featured an all-star cast including Bill Pullman as George, Nathan Lane as Clarence, Martin Landau as Mr. Potter, Penelope Ann Miller as Mary, and Sally Field as Mother Bailey.

The Last Temptation of Clarence Odbody is a 2011 novel written by John Pierson. The novel imagines the future lives of various characters if George had not survived his jump into the river.

A new "cinematic audio" adaptation by David Ossman of the Firesign Theatre was produced and directed by Ossman and his wife Judith Walcutt of Otherworld Media in December 2019 at the Whidbey Island Center for the Arts. Their version combined elements of traditional and radio theater, with costumes, sets, makeup, and lighting effects, as well as live music, live sound effects, and over 20 microphones.

=== Remakes ===
It Happened One Christmas was a 1977 television movie remake of the classic film, the screenplay of which Lionel Chetwynd based on both the original Van Doren Stern short story and the 1946 screenplay. This remake employed gender-reversal, with Marlo Thomas as the protagonist Mary Bailey, Wayne Rogers as George Hatch, and Cloris Leachman as the angel Clara Oddbody. (Note: Note the spelling difference for "Oddbody".) Leachman received her tenth Emmy nomination for this role. Orson Welles was cast as Mr. Potter. (Note: Welles signed on for projects like this in the 1970s so he could fund his own projects, including F for Fake, the then-unfinished The Other Side of the Wind, and his documentary Filming Othello.) Following initial positive reviews, the made-for-television film was rebroadcast twice in 1978 and 1979, but has not been shown since on national rebroadcasts or issued to home media. (Note: Local televisions stations do occasionally replay the movie.)

Merry Christmas, George Bailey was a 1997 PBS television movie adaptation of the film directed by Matthew Diamond and starring Bill Pullman as George Bailey, Penelope Ann Miller as Mary, Nathan Lane as Clarence, and Martin Landau as Potter.

The Christmas Spirit was a retelling of the movie starring Nicollette Sheridan as Charlotte Hart. This was a made-for-TV film aired on December 1, 2013, on the Hallmark Channel and was executive produced by Sheridan under her company, Wyke Lane Productions, and Brad Krevoy Television. The film was directed and written by Jack Angelo. Spirit was set in the present day, with the Hart character working to save a "quiet New England town from a ruthless real estate developer". The film was planned to begin a film series about the Hart character. The film had 3.372 million viewers overall.

=== Parodies and references ===
The episode Married... with Children episode "It's a Bundyful Life" (1989), Al wish he was never born, and gets a visit from his guardian angel that shows him of life would have been without him.

In the 1995 Beavis and Butt-Head Christmas special episode, in the segment "It's a Miserable Life", Butt-Head's guardian angel show him how much better the world would have been without him.

In 2002, the television film It's a Very Merry Muppet Christmas Movie premiered on NBC. The film is a homage to It's a Wonderful Life. In the film, Kermit the Frog wishes that he had never been born after money to save the Muppet Theater is lost.

In 2006, One Tree Hill's "Songs to Love and Die By" Lucas, after suffering cardiac arrest, is visited by his Uncle Keith who shows him how the lives of his friends would have been impacted without his kindness.

In season 4, episode 7 of The O.C., "The Chrismukk-huh?" (2006) Ryan and Taylor both injure themselves falling of a ladder and wake up in an alternate universe where Ryan never came to Newport.

In the 2008 episode of iCarly, "iChristmas", Carly wishes for a normal brother and is shown what her life would be like with a different version of Spencer.

"The Greatest Gift", the 2011 Warehouse 13 season 3 Christmas episode, tells a similar story after agent Pete Lattimer touches Stern's brush.

The 2023 horror film, It's a Wonderful Knife, follows Winnie Carruthers in place of George Bailey wishing she had never been born 1 year after the murder of her friend and her boyfriend’s ongoing affair. Instead of being shown the lives she’s changed, she sees the amount of lives she’s saved by killing the angel, the murderer, as in this alternate reality the angel had been running free for over a year.

=== Spin-off ===
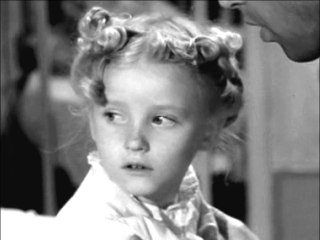
Karolyn Grimes as Zuzu Bailey

In 1990, the made-for-television film Clarence stars Robert Carradine in a new tale of the helpful angel, Clarence Odbody.

=== Cancelled sequel ===
A purported sequel was in development for a 2015 release, and was to be called It's a Wonderful Life: The Rest of the Story. It was to be written by Bob Farnsworth and Martha Bolton and follow the angel of George Bailey's daughter Zuzu (played once again by Karolyn Grimes), as she teaches Bailey's evil grandson how different the world would have been if he had never been born. Producers were considering directors and hoped to shoot the film with a $25–$35 million budget in Louisiana early in 2014.

The film had been announced as being produced by Star Partners and Hummingbird Productions, neither of which are affiliated with Paramount, owners of the original film (Farnsworth claimed that It's a Wonderful Life was in the public domain). Later, a Paramount spokesperson claimed that they were not granting permission to make the film; "To date, these individuals have not obtained any of the necessary rights, and we would take all appropriate steps to protect those rights", the spokesperson said.

=== Modern remake ===
On January 19, 2024, it was announced that Kenya Barris will write and direct a modern remake of the film for Paramount, with the intention to cast a person of color in the role of George Bailey. On the announcement, Barris remarked: "I feel like Christmas movies are amazing and I think the idea of taking something that has that long of a history and a tale behind it and putting an amazing piece of talent to tell that story ... It's a guy who's trying to help out his community and things are going to turn around on him. I think that's the perfect story to tell for a person of color — Black or brown — to get into that because our communities have some issues and someone trying to help that community out. I think that's the perfect vehicle to tell that story from."

== Sesame Street urban legend ==
It is commonly believed that the characters of Bert and Ernie on Sesame Street were named after Bert the cop and Ernie the cab driver. However, in a correction for the 1999 "Annual Xmas Quiz" in the San Francisco Chronicle, which made this claim, series writer Jerry Juhl confirmed that, per producer Jon Stone, the shared names were a coincidence. The 1996 holiday special Elmo Saves Christmas references the rumor, during a scene where Bert and Ernie walk by a TV set, which is playing the movie. The pair are surprised by the line: "Bert! Ernie! What's the matter with you two guys? You were here on my wedding night!"

== See also ==
- List of Christmas films
- List of cult films
- List of films about angels
- List of films considered the best
- List of films featuring the deaf and hard of hearing
- "Buffalo Gals", the 1844 song George Bailey and Mary Hatch liked to sing
- Butterfly effect
- Dastar Corp. v. Twentieth Century Fox Film Corp. (a legal case partially relating to another example of an out-of-copyright adaptation of a work still under copyright)
- A Wonderful Life, a 1951 short film produced by the National Council of Churches of Christ
- Mr. Destiny, a 1990 film
- The Family Man, a 2000 film
- Parallel universes in fiction
- Zu Zu Ginger Snaps
