= Knox Cubes =

Intelligence test

The Knox Cube Imitation Test (KCIT, or CIT, or KCT) was developed as a nonverbal intelligence test developed by Dr. Howard Andrew Knox, a medical officer at Ellis Island. It was first published as a pamphlet in 1913, and then in 1914 as a paper in The Journal of the American Medical Association.

Knox wrote:

From different sources have come many requests for the description of the tests worked out and conclusions reached in the practical work that has been done on Ellis Island on mental defectives. For this reason I present this paper, based on tests which I have made on over 4,000 suspected defectives in the last eighteen months and many more made by my associates ... all were considered sufficiently near the required standard to be allowed to pass, except 400 certified as feeble-minded and (in a few cases) as imbeciles.

There were several other tests presented in his paper besides the cube test. In the cube test, 4 black 1" cubes were placed in a row, each cube separated by 4 inches from its neighbors. The test administrators takes a smaller cube and taps on the 4 1" cubes in increasingly complicated sequences. The test subject is requested, sometimes only by sign language, to repeat the sequence. If the cubes are numbered 1 through 4, the sequences in order are:

a. 1,2,3,4
b. 1,2,3,4,3
c. 1,2,3,4,2
d. 1,3,2,4,3
e. 1,3,4,2,1

and so on.

Knox suggested that sequence a (1-2-3-4) is reasonable for a child of 4 years of age, sequence b (1-2-3-4-3) is suitable for a 5-year-old, sequence c (1-2-3-4-2) can be accomplished by a 6-year-old, sequence d (1-3-2-4) can be done by the average 8-year-old, and copying sequence e (1-3-4-2-3-1) is expected by most 11-year-olds. Some of these sequences were repeated as part of other published tests such as Arthur (1947) and Wright & Stone (1979).

Performance on the Knox Cube Imitation Test is correlated with both verbal IQ and performance IQ.

== See also ==
- Henry H. Goddard
- Vineland Training School
- Simon (game)
- N-back
