= Liberty Films =

Defunct American motion picture company co-owned by Frank Capra and Samuel J. Briskin

Liberty Films Inc.
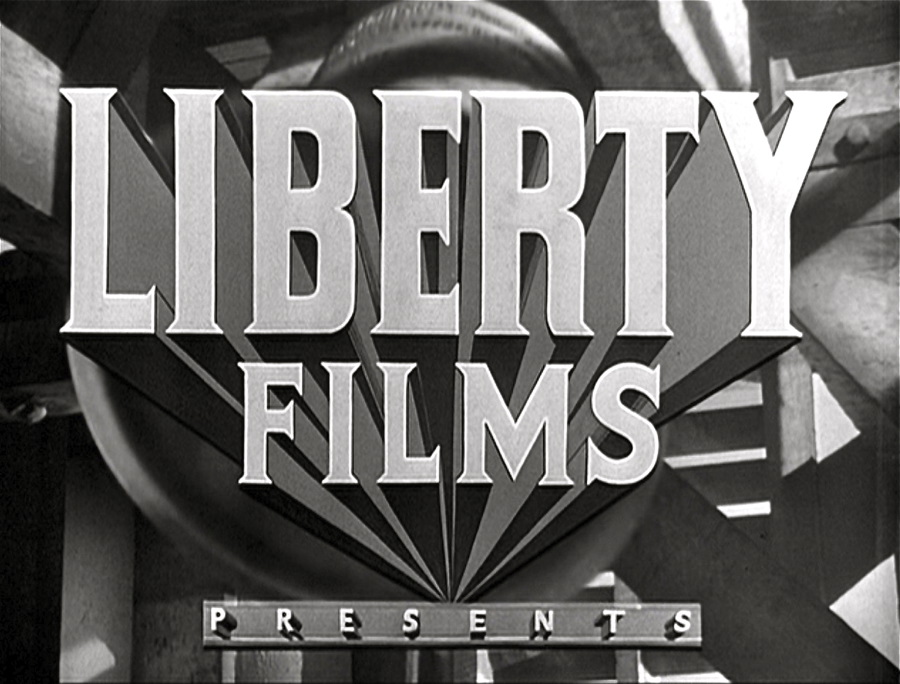
- Type: Independent
- Industry: Film
- Founded: April 1945
- Founder: Frank Capra; Samuel J. Briskin
- Defunct: 1951
- Successors: Library: Paramount Pictures (It's a Wonderful Life); Universal Television (State of the Union)
- Headquarters: California, United States
- Key people: Frank Capra; Samuel J. Briskin; William Wyler; George Stevens
- Products: Films
- Owner: Independent (1945–1947); Paramount Pictures (1947–1951)

Liberty Films was an independent motion picture production company founded in California by Frank Capra and Samuel J. Briskin in April 1945. It produced only two films, the Christmas classic It's a Wonderful Life (1946), originally released by RKO Radio Pictures, and the film version of the hit play State of the Union (1948), originally released by Metro-Goldwyn-Mayer. (Note: In later years, Capra bought the film and re-released it himself, so current prints do not show Leo the Lion roaring at the beginning.) Liberty Films' logo was the Liberty Bell ringing loudly.

== History ==
Capra had made two previous attempts at independent production. He formed Frank Capra Productions in 1939 and produced Meet John Doe, but dissolved it when he joined the U.S. Army Signal Corps in December 1941. Later during World War II he unsuccessfully sought a production partnership with director Leo McCarey.

All four eventual partners in Liberty Pictures had spent most of World War II as officers making motion pictures for the Army Signal Corps, and were hesitant to return to working under the Hollywood studio system. Capra explained his dissatisfaction in an article for the New York Times:

Had the motion picture been a product which demanded uniformity as its ultimate goal, the results would have been highly satisfactory. But unfortunately it was, and is, a combination of mechanical perfection and creative endeavor. And in applying the mass-production yardstick to both the mechanics and creative side of film-making, the latter became molded into a pattern. The efforts and achievements of the individual producers and directors had to meet with the approval of each studio's chief executive.… Producers and directors working under him found that instead of creating as they pleased, letting their own imagination and artistry have full rein, with the public the final judge of the worth and merit of their efforts, they were of necessity obliged to make pictures for the approval of the one man at the top. Thus the creative side of film-making, from the selection of the story, the writers who would put it into script form, the casting of the players, the designing of their costumes and the sets which provided their backgrounds, the direction, the cutting and editing of the final film was tailored (consciously or unconsciously) to the tastes of the studio's head man.

Briskin had been production chief at Columbia Pictures, where Capra had worked since 1927. Within months of Liberty's incorporation, directors William Wyler and George Stevens became partners.

Liberty was capitalized at $1,000,000, and it had a standing bank credit of $3,500,000, for which the four owners were individually and collectively responsible. The ownership was divided unequally among the partners: 32 percent to Capra as president and organizer, 18 percent to Briskin, 25 percent each to Wyler and Stevens. But their voting rights were equal. By dissolving Liberty a few years hence, as the partners planned, they would pay only a 25% capital gains tax on the profits instead of the 90% income tax they would pay on their high salaries at a studio.

=== Production schedule ===
Liberty contracted in August 1945 to produce nine features for distribution by RKO, three each from the three producer-directors, who were each expected to deliver one picture per year. The production offices of Liberty Films were housed at RKO Studios.

The company announced in November 1945 that its first production would be James Stewart in It's a Wonderful Life, produced and directed by Capra. Capra's next pictures were to be adaptations of Jessamyn West's novel The Friendly Persuasion and Alfred Noyes' novel No Other Man. William Wyler planned to direct an adaptation of Stendhal's The Red and the Black. George Stevens was announced to produce and direct One Big Happy Family, written by Joseph Fields.

The film rights to the play State of the Union were acquired in late 1946, with an intended release before the presidential election in 1948. To obtain Spencer Tracy for the lead role, when he was under contract to Metro-Goldwyn-Mayer, Liberty Films agreed to pay for use of MGM's production facilities to make the picture, and to pay MGM's parent company a percentage distribution fee.

=== Fate of studio ===
Liberty's first release, It's a Wonderful Life, in December 1946, was a financial failure. Although it was in the top 7% of that year's films as ranked by box office gross, it was unable to recoup its high production cost of $2.3 million, much less show a profit.

The partners sought a major studio to buy Liberty Films before bank foreclosure, although Wyler and Stevens were "violently opposed" to the idea at first; Paramount Pictures bought the company in May 1947. The four partners were given a total of $3,450,000 in Paramount stock, and Capra, Wyler, and Stevens were given five-picture contracts at Paramount.

In the purchase, Paramount acquired Liberty's interest in three movies: It's a Wonderful Life, I Remember Mama (which George Stevens was filming at RKO), (Note: I Remember Mama was an RKO production; Liberty Films' financial interest came from leasing Stevens' services as director.) and State of the Union (not yet filmed). The multi-picture deal at Paramount resulted in Capra directing Riding High and Here Comes the Groom; Stevens directing A Place in the Sun, Something to Live For, and Shane; and Wyler directing The Heiress, Detective Story, Carrie, Roman Holiday, and The Desperate Hours.

The company was finally dissolved in April 1951. Capra later wrote that the creation of Liberty Films was to "(1) influence the course of Hollywood films, (2) make four former Army officers independently rich, and (3) virtually prove fatal to my professional career."

=== Film library ===
==== It's a Wonderful Life ====
Incorporated into its pre-1950 catalog, Paramount sold the rights to the film to U.M. & M. TV Corporation in 1955, along with numerous of its short subjects. These were later sold to National Telefilm Associates, and in turn became Republic Pictures, which was sold to Paramount's then-owner, Viacom, in 1999 - hence Paramount (via Melange Pictures) now once again owns It's a Wonderful Life.

==== State of the Union ====
While selling the 1946 film, Paramount continued to own State of the Union for another three years, until MCA acquired most of Paramount's pre-1950 theatrical sound features in 1958 and formed EMKA, Ltd. to hold the copyright. Since MCA bought the US branch of Decca Records, which then owned Universal Studios, in 1962, this explains why NBCUniversal (via EMKA) owns the rights to State... today.

== Filmography ==
- It's A Wonderful Life (1946)
- State of the Union (1948)
