= Howard Davis =

Howard Davis is the name of:

- Howard Davis (professor of architecture) (born 1948), American writer and professor of architecture at the University of Oregon
- Howard Davis (musician) (1940–2008), British violinist
- Howard Davis (sprinter) (born 1967), Jamaican athlete
- Howard Davis (chemical engineer) (1937–2009), American chemical engineer
- Howard Davis (field hockey) (born 1932), British Olympic hockey player
- Howard Davis Jr. (1956–2015), American amateur and professional boxer, won Olympic gold, 1976
- Howard McParlin Davis (1918–1994), American professor of art history at Columbia University
- Howard W. Davis (1885–1959), member of the California State Assembly and the Los Angeles City Council
- Howard Stratton Davis (1885–1969), English architect
- H-Bomb Davis (Howard Davis, born 1971), drummer, member of the alternative band Evans Blue

== See also ==
- Howard Davies (disambiguation)
