= Howard Baker (disambiguation) =

Howard Baker (1925–2014) was a U.S. senator from Tennessee and ambassador to Japan.

Howard Baker may also refer to:

- Howard Baker (baseball) (1888–1964), Major League Baseball player
- Benjamin Howard Baker (1892–1987), English association football player and high jumper
- Howard Baker (poet) (1905–1990), American poet
- Howard Baker Sr. (1902–1964), U.S. representative
- Howard Baker (ice hockey), Canadian ice hockey player

== See also ==
- Howard H. Baker Jr. Center for Public Policy, Knoxville, Tennessee
