= Howard Davies =

Howard Davies may refer to:

- Howard Davies (rugby union) (1916–1987), Wales rugby union international
- Sir Howard Davies (economist) (born 1951), former Director of the London School of Economics and former British financial regulator
- Howard Davies (director) (1945–2016), English theatre director
- Howard R. Davies (1895–1973), English originator of the historic HRD motorcycle marque and motorcycle racer
- Howard Davies (hurdler) (1906–1993), South African hurdler
- Howard Davies (sprinter) (born 1944), British sprinter
- Howard Davies (actor) (1879–1947), English-born American actor in The Man Who Laughs (1928 film)

== See also ==
- Howard Davis (disambiguation)
- John Howard Davies (1939–2011), English child actor who later became a television director and producer
