= Howard McParlin Davis =

American art historian (1914–1994)

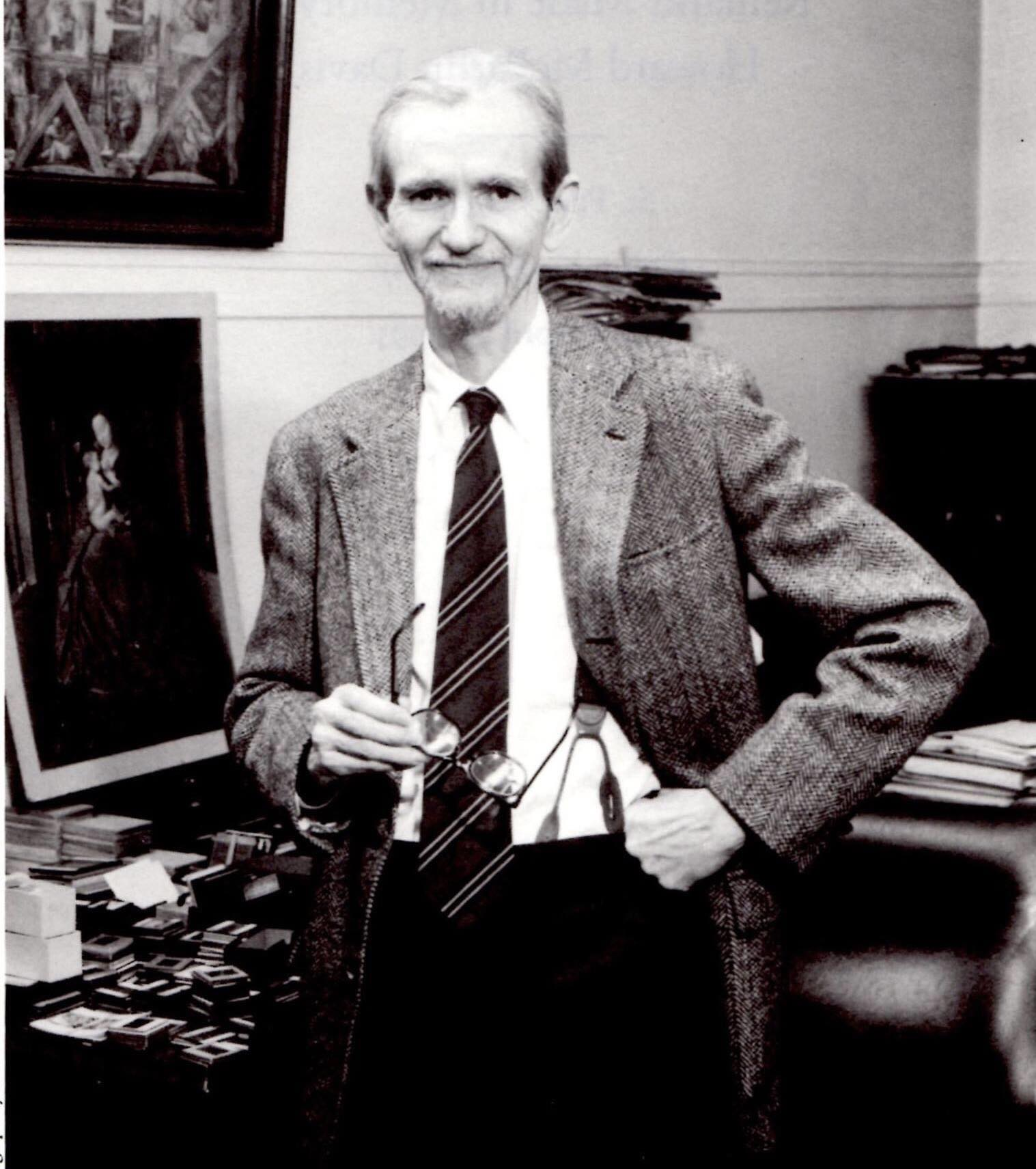
- Born: September 18, 1914; Baltimore, Maryland, United States
- Died: September 9, 1994 (aged 79); New York City, New York, United States
- Occupation: Art historian

Howard McParlin Davis (September 18, 1914 – September 9, 1994) was a longtime professor of Art History at Columbia University. "His classes in Italian Renaissance painting and on Northern European painting were among the most popular undergraduate courses at Columbia," and thanks to him, "[g]enerations of Columbia College students graduated with an especially deep appreciation of the art of Giotto and of Jan van Eyck."

== Early life and education ==
Born in Baltimore, Davis graduated from Princeton in 1936 (double major in French language, French literature). Thanks to a Carnegie Fellowship, he studied at the Institut d'Art et d'Archèologie (Paris) in the summer of 1937. A Belgian-American Educational Foundation Fellowship enabled him to study in Brussels in 1938. In 1939 he earned a Master of Fine Arts degree in art history, again from Princeton. With a Fulbright Senior Research Grant he spent 1950–51 in Italy researching Gian Lorenzo Bernini.

== Career ==
Before the end of his graduate studies, he had found employment at the Metropolitan Museum of Art in New York, first in medieval art and then in prints. His teaching career began in 1942 at Hunter College (NY); he moved to Columbia in 1944 and stayed there until he hit its mandatory retirement age of 70. He was chairman of the department of art history and archaeology from 1969 to 1972 and was named Moore Collegiate Professor of Art History in 1980.

Davis' publications include "Fantasy and Irony in Pieter Bruegel's Prints" (1943), "Gravity in the Paintings of Giotto" (1971), and "Bees on the Tomb of Urban VIII" (1989). However, it was as a teacher, rather than a scholar, that he was best known.

== Awards and recognition ==
He earned awards over the years, notably Columbia's Mark Van Doren Award in 1968, the Great Teacher Award of the Society of Older Graduates of Columbia in 1970, and the College Art Association of America's award for Distinguished Teaching of Art History in 1984. An accolade of another sort was his portrayal in Charles Kuralt's America.

== Death and legacy ==
Davis died of heart disease just nine days short of his 80th birthday. His only child, Alison McParlin Davis-Murphy, is a writer, photographer, and guitarist living in Los Angeles.

In 2020, a gift from an anonymous donor enabled Columbia University to establish an endowed professorship in honor of Davis. The Howard McP. Davis Professorship of Art History "will support a Columbia art historian of European art and architecture in the period from 1300 to 1700."
