= Howard Anderson =

Howard Anderson may refer to:

== People ==
- Howard A. Anderson Jr. (1920–2015), American visual effects artist and title designer
- Howard C. Anderson Jr., North Dakota politician
- Howard P. Anderson (1915–2000), Virginia politician
- Howard Anderson (ice hockey), for Trail Smoke Eaters (senior)
- Howard A. Anderson, American visual effects artist, see Academy Award for Best Visual Effects

== Fictional characters ==
- Howard Anderson, character in Babies for Sale
- Howard Anderson, character in Legion (2010 film)
