= Howard Baker (ice hockey) =

Canadian ice hockey player

- Height: 5 ft 10 in (178 cm)
- Weight: 170 lb (77 kg; 12 st 2 lb)
- Position: Defence
- Played for: Toronto Blueshirts
- Playing career: 1914–1915

Howard Baker was a Canadian professional lacrosse and ice hockey player from Cornwall, Ontario. He played as a defenceman with the Toronto Blueshirts of the National Hockey Association during the 1914–15 season.

Prior to turning out with the Toronto Blueshirts in hockey, Baker had played lacrosse with the Irish-Canadians of Montreal, Quebec.
