= Howard Walker =

Howard Walker may refer to:

- Howard Walker (ice hockey) (born 1958), Canadian ice hockey player
- Howard Walker (politician) (born 1954), American politician from Michigan
- Howard Kent Walker (born 1935), US diplomat
