= Howard Williams =

Howard Williams may refer to:

- Howard Williams (humanitarian) (1837–1931), English activist, historian, and writer
- Howard Williams (archaeologist), British archaeologist
- Howard Williams (TV presenter), British TV presenter with Basil Brush glove puppet
- Howard Williams (conductor) (1947), British opera, orchestral and choral conductor
- Howard Williams (ceramicist) (1935), New Zealand ceramist and art writer
- Howard Williams (field hockey), British and Welsh field hockey international
- Andy Williams (Howard Andrew Williams, 1927–2012), American singer and television host
- Howie Williams (basketball) (Howard Earl Williams, 1927–2004), American basketball player
- Howie Williams (born 1936), American football safety
- Howard Lloyd Williams (born 1950), British political scientist and philosopher
