= Howard Evans =

Howard Evans may refer to:

- Howard Evans (journalist) (1839–1915), British Radical and Nonconformist journalist
- Howard Ensign Evans (1919–2002), American entomologist
- Howard Evans (trumpeter) (1944–2006), British trumpeter
