= Howie Davis =

American basketball executive

Howie Davis was a native of Far Rockaway, New York who founded the Harlem Wizards basketball team. He worked for many years as a sports promoter. He was a promoter for the Brooklyn Dodgers and the Staten Island Stapes football teams. He raised over 150 million dollars for schools.
