= Howard Andrew Knox =

Howard Andrew Knox (March 7, 1885 – July 27, 1949) was an American medical doctor and eugenicist specializing in heart and rheumatic diseases. Serving as an assistant surgeon at Ellis Island during the early 1900s, he made major contributions to intelligence testing through the methods he devised to screen immigrants for mental deficiencies. However, at the time of his death, he was most well known as a veteran, a general physician, and a contributing member of his community, and his contributions to intelligence testing had become largely forgotten. Although his work in this area has become largely overlooked, his contributions have served as an important link between early intelligence research and present day intelligence testing.

== Personal life ==
Howard Andrew Knox was born on March 7, 1885, in Romeo, Michigan. He was the only child of Howard Reuben Knox and Jennie Mahaffy Knox. Howard's father was originally from Ashtabula County, Ohio, and worked as a traveling salesman. Jennie was born in Romeo, although she spent her youth in Ireland until moving back to Ohio as an adolescent to help her father on his farm. Howard's parents were married in 1879, after which Howard Senior moved in with Jennie to help on her father's farm in Romeo. When Howard A. was born, the three generations moved together to Ashtabula, Ohio, near Lake Erie. Howard's parents eventually divorced when his father moved to Virginia for work, although his father remained in touch until his death in the 1920s. In 1894, at the age of nine, Howard's mother remarried to a man named Leander Blackwell, who, as a medical doctor himself, may have influenced Howard's career path.

Knox met his wife, Marion Dorothy Henderson, while he was at his first job after graduating from medical school. Little is known about Marion, other than that she was the third cousin of Knox's mother's side of the family. Knox and Marion were married in 1906, and divorced in 1910 after Knox's ailing mother moved in with the married couple, which led to a marital dispute.

In early 1911, Knox took leave from the Army to marry Gladys Barnett Reed, a woman of family wealth from Brooklyn, New York. Details of how they met are unknown, but it is clear that by marrying Gladys, Knox advanced into a higher social class. They had a daughter, Dorothea, on October 28, 1911; and a second daughter, Gladys Sprague Knox, on January 24, 1913. In 1914, Howard and Gladys Knox divorced.

Knox married Maka Harper in 1916 and had a daughter, Carolyn Knox (later Carolyn Knox Whaley), and two sons, Howard Knox and Robert Harper Knox.

== Education ==
After graduating from high school in Willimantic, Connecticut, Knox enrolled in the Medical School at Dartmouth College in Hanover, New Hampshire. Only a few months after enrolling, his stepfather was killed in a tragic accident involving a freight train at a railway crossing, for which his mother later brought suit against the Central Vermont Railway Company Compounding this loss, Knox's grandfather also died several months later, and he withdrew from his studies at Dartmouth for a period of time to help his mother. He returned to his studies and received his medical doctorate on March 27, 1908.

While in medical school, Knox had completed some specialization in psychiatry. Upon graduating he took a staff job at the Worcester Insane Hospital, in Worcester, Massachusetts, near his mother. Although the hospital had originally been a promising model for many institutions, by the time Knox took the job, it was in deep decline.

However, a new opportunity opened for Knox, when in 1908 Congress approved a reorganization of the Army's medical department, officially designating the Army's regular physicians within the Medical Department as the Medical Corps. In order to be trained in the area of military medicine, physicians were called to become part of the Army through the Medical Reserve Corps. Knox applied to this program several months later and was accepted into the Medical Reserve Corps with the rank of first lieutenant.

== Career ==
=== US Army (1908-1911) ===
Knox began his military career as a surgeon at Fort Michie, on Great Gull Island in Long Island Sound, off of New London, Connecticut. Most coastal forts, especially those that were relatively isolated from major cities (like Fort Michie), had their own hospitals. Knox and his wife arrived at Fort Michie on October 3, 1908 and lived there for about a year. It was here that Marion gave birth to their daughter, Violet in 1909; however, Violet was not healthy and died within a few months.

After receiving high reviews from his commanding officer in 1909, Knox decided to seek a position at the Army Medical Corps. To do so, he underwent training for one year at The Army Medical School in Washington, D.C. After a year, he graduated forty-fourth in his class of fifty-four students in April 1910. His first station was as an assistant to the general surgeon at Fort Hancock in New Jersey. That summer, he made first lieutenant in the U.S. Army Medical Corps. Not long after, Knox's mother became sick and moved in with him and Marion. A matrimonial dispute occurred, which is not well documented, but it is clear that Marion left and later filed a complaint with the War Department stating that Knox had left her and failed to provide financial support. He claimed that Marion refused to live with him unless his mother left the house. The War Department was satisfied with this response and determined that no action would be taken; however, it has been suggested that this event may have colored Knox's reputation with the Army.

In the summer of 1910, Knox was placed at Fort Ethan Allen, which had opened only three years earlier in 1908 near Lake Ontario, as an Army training center. During his first month, he worked at the stationary hospital at Pine Camp, which would have served those injured during training at Pine Camp. During his time here he did take ten days leave to return to Fort Hancock where he again served as the assistant to the general surgeon. Here he drafted his first publication, a brief case report on a young patient with filariasis. In January 1911, Knox took an official leave from the Army to marry Gladys Barnett Reed

After Fort Ethan Allen, Knox was assigned as assistant to the surgeon at the infirmary of the Third Provisional Regiment in Fort Crockett, which had recently reopened after sustaining hurricane damage in 1900. Here he was on duty beginning March 18, 1911. In April however, he requested to be restationed at Fort Hancock near his mother, to assist her as she needed to have surgery. Although his commanding officer supported his transition, the paperwork was not received by the adjutant general until nearly a week later. The surgeon general was consulted, who had previously been the president of the Army Medical School during Knox's enrollment and had written a positive evaluation for him then. However, at this time, he noted that several events had rendered Knox's future with the Army to be uncertain, and thus recommended resignation. Knox officially resigned from the Army at the end of April, 1911.

=== Civilian career ===
After leaving the Army, Knox and his wife moved to Sheffield in Berkshire County, Massachusetts. Here, he started his own practice as a general physician. In 1910, lectures given by Sigmund Freud and Carl Jung were published in the American Journal of Psychology, and their work was well known among psychologists as well as medical doctors during this time. Knox was among those interested physicians, and he showed an interest in intelligence.

His first article on the topic was published in 1913 in the Journal of the American Medical Association, in which he demonstrated not only an interest in intelligence testing but also in its cultural sensitivity. In this article, Knox focuses on the differentiation between those with "mental aberration" or active insanity, versus those "mental defectives" classified as "morons and constitutional inferior types." During this time, Alfred Binet was publishing his research on intelligence testing. In this JAMA article, Knox draws reference to Binet's research and the development of intelligence tests during the time. He pointed out that although intelligence tests can differentiate the less intelligent, less well developed class of people, if administered to individuals from another culture or country, the individuals might be incorrectly classified as morons. He wrote, "if these peasants are questioned about conditions existing in the land from which they come, most of them will show average intelligence."

Knox continued to show interest in psychology in his next article, also published in 1913. In this article he wrote about a case he had seen in Sheffield, a man who had persistent persecutory delusions. Knox stated that for a period of time, he had listened to this man recount his delusions and wrote down the details in his notebook. After a period of time, the man appeared to recover; and Knox believed that by writing down his delusions, he had validated the patient which contributed to his improvement.

In October 1911, Knox attempted to rejoin the Army and applied to the office of the surgeon general for readmission. His application was received in 1912, but his application was not well received. Although it is not clear precisely why Knox fell out of favor of the Army, there are several possibilities. It is possible that his discovery and reported treatment of rampant venereal disease while at Fort Hancock was frowned upon, as at the time venereal disease was quite stigmatizing and his treatment of it might have been considered immoral. It is also possible that the rapid dissolution of his marriage to Marion, and quick remarriage to Gladys, painted him as an unreliable man. In any case, he was not permitted readmission to the Army.

Nevertheless, he did find success in another branch of the government. In October 1911, in addition to reapplying to the Army, Knox also applied to the Public Health and Marine Hospital Service. Officers were only selected from the pool of applicants twice per year, so it was not until April 1912 that he went before a board of examiners. Knox scored an average of 84.99 percent, which led to his appointment with the Public Health and Marine Hospital Service in New York City. In May he was assigned to work in the immigration station at Ellis Island.

At the time there was a movement to restrict immigration into the US, as it was widely believed that "morons" or feebleminded individuals were the cause of many societal problems and that border authorities were weakening the nation by allowing far too many of these individuals to enter the country. Ellis Island on New York Harbor was the hub for arrival when the immigration station there was rebuilt in 1900. At first, emigrants were lined up and inspected primarily for medical ailments, initially based on the individual's overall appearance. More scrutizing inspections were conducted if an individual was flagged for some ailment. For the most part, until this time, any concern regarding mental disorders was limited to psychiatric illnesses. However, as Francis Galton's ideas regarding eugenics. became more popular in the early 1900s, concerns for that feebleminded individuals were weakening society grew, and mental deficiency among emigrants also became a concern. Another important contributing factor was the development of intelligence tests during this time. Both Alfred Binet and his student Theodore Simon were leaders in this development. Henry Goddard, a prominent eugenicist of the time who had been using Binet and Simon’s scale to measure intelligence in adults, suggested that these could be used to identify feebleminded or mentally deficient individuals at Ellis Island who posed a threat to the integrity of society. By 1910, the concerns for mentally defective people entering the United States had grown to such an extent that the officials at Ellis Island invited Henry Goddard to teach the physicians about intelligence testing. However, after spending an entire day there, Goddard had no recommendations for the physicians, as he was impressed by both the size of the problem as well as the physicians ability to detect defect given the number of individuals coming through the immigration station.

Knox’s appointment at Ellis Island allowed him to make what was his most significant contribution to medical science. Early in their time at Ellis Island, both Knox and his colleague, Glueck recognized two issues with using the Binet and Simon scales to measure intelligence in emigrants. First, the scale tested semantic knowledge that was specific to geographic location or culture. Individuals from other cultures might not fare well on these tests, and thus the measures could inaccurately classify them as mentally defective, when tests specific to their own location or culture would not. Further, the normative data used for comparing any individual score to an "average" individual of the same age was based on French or American schoolchildren, which would not be appropriate for determining mental fitness for entering the United States.

Knox set out to address the first problem, in his article published in the November issue of the New York Medical Journal in 1913. In this paper, he put forth two new performance tests, that were not based on verbal or cultural knowledge. The Cube Imitation Test, also known as Knox Cubes, consisted of four large black cubes and one small black cube. The examiner moves the small cube slowly and deliberately in various patterns in relation to the larger four cubes. The examinee is asked to imitate the movements conducted by the examiner. Each trial increases in difficulty and complexity. He also introduced a form board test (called the Geographical Puzzle, or "G" Test), which involved fitting pieces into proper places on a board, requiring both motor coordination as well as decision making. He believed that together these two tests could determine with increased accuracy whether an emigrant was mentally deficient, as neither required specific cultural knowledge for successful performance.

It appeared as if Knox had found his niche, as he published follow up articles on the Cube Imitation Test and other intelligence tests to be used at Ellis Island. In late 1913, he published a short article as a follow up of the original Cube Imitation Test paper, in which he introduced a new form board, which normally developing six-year-olds were reportedly easily able to complete. He argued that adults who were not able to complete the task in the same time as six-year-olds should be classified as Imbeciles; thus, it was called the Imbecile Test In this article he also introduced another test, which he called the Moron test, which was also a form board that could be completed by ten-year-olds rather quickly, and thus, adults who could not complete this test in the same amount of time were determined to be morons. In this article he argued that normally developing six In 1914, he published an article that addressed the issue of examining intelligence in emigrants over the age of 12. Through 1914, Knox published a number of articles in which he introduced various tests used at Ellis Island, as well as various batteries or combinations of tests used together, including the Construction Blocks Test, the Knox-Kempf profile test (also known as the Feature Profile Test), and the Ship Test, as well as a series of tests that could be used as make up tests for adults who had failed their original round of mental age tests. On his series of make-up tests, Knox also introduced the idea that various start points should be implemented on tests involving tasks which could be reportedly mastered at various ages; specifically, if an individual was assumed to be at a mental age of 9, they should begin the series of tests on the item that was ostensibly able to be successfully completed by a nine year old.

Before long, Knox's tests became well known among medical doctors and psychologists throughout the United States. Other physicians at Ellis Island also published similar articles expressing concerns similar to Knox's regarding the cultural sensitivity of many of the established intelligence tests, indicating that he was not alone in his concerns. Yet, Knox left Ellis Island in May 1916, and did not return to the field of intelligence testing.

In 1916, Knox remarried to a woman named Maka Harper. They took a short honeymoon, and during this time he resigned from Ellis Island. He moved back to Ashtabula, Ohio, where he had lived until the age of nine. He lived here for a short time and then moved to Skillman, New Jersey to take a position as the clinical director in the New Jersey State Village for Epileptics. He worked here for five months, after which he opened a private practice in Hudson City, New Jersey. In 1922, he and his family moved to New Hampton, New Jersey, where he lived until he died of arteriosclerosis in 1949.
