= Howie King =

Irish footballer

Personal information
- Full name: Howard King
- Date of birth: 8 August 1969 (age 57)
- Place of birth: Dublin, Ireland
- Position: Striker

Youth career
- -1989: Home Farm

Senior career*
Years	Team	Apps	(Gls)
1988–1989	Shamrock Rovers	14	(1)
1989–1991	Bray Wanderers	2	(0)
1991–1992	Lisburn Distillery	25	(8)
1992–1993	Limerick	27	(5)
1993–1994	Bohemians	20	(1)
1994–1999	Limerick	138	(36)
1999–2000	Kilkenny	20	(1)
Total		246	(52)
- * Club domestic league appearances and goals

Howie King (born 9 September 1969) is an Irish former soccer player.

King was a midfielder or forward who represented Shamrock Rovers, Bray Wanderers and Bohemians amongst others during his career in the League of Ireland. He was part of Limerick's 1993 League of Ireland Cup winning squad, scoring the first goal in a 2–0 victory over St. Patrick's Athletic, and signed for Bohs in the summer of that year.

He made his League of Ireland debut for Rovers against Athlone Town on the opening day of the 1988–89 League of Ireland Premier Division season on 4 September 1988. In his one season at Rovers he made 14 appearances scoring one goal against Cork City on 13 November 1988.
