= Harlem Wizards =

Professional basketball team

- Leagues: Independent
- Founded: 1962
- History: 1962–present Harlem Wizards
- Arena: Worldwide
- Location: Fairfield, NJ
- Team colors: Purple, Red, Gold
- President: Todd Davis
- Ownership: Todd Davis
- Website: www.harlemwizards.com
Primary	Men's Mental Health	Breast Cancer Awareness

The Harlem Wizards is a professional basketball team created in 1962 by sports promoter Howie Davis. Unlike most basketball teams, the Harlem Wizards are not primarily focused on winning games. Instead, their aim is to entertain the crowd using a variety of basketball tricks and alley oops. They perform fundraisers at local schools for the students and the rest of the community, displaying their fancy trickery through dribbling, passing, shooting, and dunking. Through these fundraisers, they have raised millions of dollars for "charitable organizations, schools, and foundations around the world." The audience is not only there to watch the Wizards, but also to participate in the show. The Wizards get the crowd involved, often bringing children out onto the floor to be part of a basketball trick or a comedy act.

The Wizards are a comedy basketball team that tour the country. The theme for the Wizards' 2010–2011 campaign was the "Basketball and Beyond Tour." They hold the second longest known winning streak in all of professional sports—over 5,000 games after the Harlem Globetrotters 24-year, 8,829 game streak

== History ==
According to harlemwizards.com, in 1943, Harlem Wizards creator Howie Davis was working as a Sports Promoter and the Sergeant and Recreation Director at Wright-Patterson Air Force Base in Dayton, Ohio. The World Professional Basketball Tournament in Chicago asked Davis to provide an emergency 8th team to compete in the tournament. Within one week, Davis assembled the Dayton Dive Bombers. The Dive Bombers' first round opponent in the tournament was the previous World Champion, the Harlem Globetrotters. The Dive Bombers pulled the upset and the Globetrotters' manager, Abe Saperstein, refused to even shake Davis' hand after the game. Davis was intrigued by this event, and twenty years later, he decided to create his own show basketball team, the Harlem Wizards.

Before Davis got into sports management and promotion, Howie Davis played semi-professional baseball for a couple years. He eventually managed the Brooklyn Dodgers football team, the Staten Island Stapes, and the Kokomo Clowns, who actually played in clown outfits. Before creating the Harlem Wizards, he was also a scout for the San Francisco Giants.

In 1962, Davis created the Wizards, wanting to expand on Saperstein's idea of the Globetrotters. Davis wanted the Wizards to be an even more competitive, creative, and entertaining team than the Globetrotters.

When Howie Davis died in 1992, his son, Todd Davis, took over as the President of the Harlem Wizards organization.

Since 1962, the Wizards have played over 10,000 games, both in the United States and abroad. They have played on five continents and in 22 countries.

== Current roster ==
Harlem Wizards roster
Players

Pos.	No.	Player	Height	Weight	DOB	From
F	000	Dwayne "Swoop" Simpson (C)	6 ft 7 in (2.01 m)			Southern Connecticut
F	0	Jason "Wavey" Barrera	6 ft 1 in (1.85 m)			Mount Saint Vincent
G	1	Arthur "King Arthur" Lewis	5 ft 9 in (1.75 m)			Bowie State
F	2	Lamarvin "Showtime" Jackson (C)	6 ft 6 in (1.98 m)			Little Rock
G	3	Jimmy "Live Action" Bosque	6 ft 3 in (1.91 m)			Borough of Manhattan CC
G	4	James "Road Runner" Tyndal	5 ft 9 in (1.75 m)			Buffalo State College
G	5	Eric "Broadway" Jones (C)	6 ft 2 in (1.88 m)			Urbana
G	6	Roman "La Fiesta" Hernandez	5 ft 5 in (1.65 m)			Montclair State
F	7	Gerald "Skywalker" Warrick	6 ft 6 in (1.98 m)			Point Park
G	8	Devon "Livewire" Curry	6 ft 2 in (1.88 m)			Pasco-Hernando CC & Western Texas College
G	9	Arnold "A-Train" Bernard	5 ft 6 in (1.68 m)			Missouri State
C	10	Patric "The Artist" Massey	6 ft 10 in (2.08 m)			Columbia College
G	12	Joseph "Jet" Bunce-Grenon	6 ft 0 in (1.83 m)			Regis College
F	13	Rob "Smooth" Young	6 ft 4 in (1.93 m)			Bloomfield College
F	15	Lloyd "Loonatik" Clinton	6 ft 5 in (1.96 m)			Allen University
C	20	TJ "Tomahawk" Stukes	6 ft 9 in (2.06 m)			Pittsburg State
G	21	Jack "Blackjack" Ryan	6 ft 0 in (1.83 m)			Brooklyn
F	22	Brandon "Werm" Lacue	6 ft 3 in (1.91 m)			Howard College
F	23	Leon "Space Jam" Sewell	6 ft 2 in (1.88 m)			Bethel (TN)
G	24	Rashaan "Rocket" Barner (C)	6 ft 0 in (1.83 m)			William Paterson University
F	25	Jordan "Ice" Southerland	6 ft 3 in (1.91 m)			NA
F	26	Jordan "Hang-Time" Hoose	6 ft 5 in (1.96 m)			Morrisville State College
F	30	Roscoe "Sarge" Johnson Jr.	6 ft 5 in (1.96 m)			Allegany College of Maryland
C	31	John "Big J" Smith	6 ft 9 in (2.06 m)			Staten Island
G	33	David "D.P." Paul	6 ft 6 in (1.98 m)			Staten Island
F	50	Courtland "Astro" Holloway	6 ft 5 in (1.96 m)			Tohono Oʼodham Community College

Coaches
Head coach
- (United States) Swoop
- (United States) Broadway
- (United States) Showtime
- (United States) Rocket

Legend
- (DP) Unsigned draft pick
- (FA) Free agent
- (S) Suspended
- Injured

Roster

== Former players ==
- Tiny Archibald
- Hollis Copeland
- Mario Elie
- Connie Hawkins
- Hawthorne Wingo
- Sam Worthen
- Luis Da Silva "Trikz"
