= A Wonderful Life (musical) =

1986 musical

- Music: Joe Raposo
- Lyrics: Sheldon Harnick
- Book: Sheldon Harnick
- Basis: Frank Capra's film It's a Wonderful Life
- Productions: 1986 University of Michigan; 1991 Washington DC; 2005 Broadway concert 2006 Millburn, New Jersey

A Wonderful Life is a 1986 musical with a book and lyrics by Sheldon Harnick and music by Joe Raposo.

Based on the 1946 Frank Capra film It's a Wonderful Life starring James Stewart, the story closely follows the original plot, set in 1945, telling the story of a suicidal man whose guardian angel reveals to him how different the world and everyone whose life he has touched would be if he'd never been born. The film was based on the 1943 short booklet by Philip Van Doren Stern, The Greatest Gift.

== Background and production history ==
Harnick and Raposo worked for many years to put together a musical version of It's a Wonderful Life, but just as the musical's book was completed, a controversy arose over the rights to the underlying Stern story that delayed production of the show. During this delay, Raposo died of cancer in 1989.

A Wonderful Life was performed initially at the University of Michigan in 1986. The first professional production took place at the Wagon Wheel Playhouse in Warsaw, Indiana, in 1988, followed by a staged reading at the Paper Mill Playhouse, Millburn, New Jersey, in 1990. It was produced at Washington, DC's Arena Stage, running from November 15, 1991, to January 5, 1992.

On December 12, 2005, a staged concert version was directed by Carl Andress and choreographed by Denis Jones at the Shubert Theatre in New York City for the benefit of the Actors' Fund of America. Among the Broadway notables who participated were Brian Stokes Mitchell as George Bailey, David Hyde Pierce as guardian angel Clarence, Judy Kuhn as Mary Bailey, Dominic Chianese as Mr. Potter, Karen Ziemba as The MC, Philip Bosco as Joseph, Marian Seldes as Mrs. Hatch, Ronn Carroll as Tom Bailey, Marc Kudisch as Sam Wainwright, Michael Berresse as Harry Bailey, Nancy Anderson as Violet, Chuck Cooper as Uncle Billy, George S. Irving as Mr. Martini, Jayne Houdyshell as Mrs. Martini, and Phylicia Rashad as Millie Bailey. The event was hosted by Actors Fund President Joseph Benincasa and Vice Chair of the Actors Fund Bebe Neuwirth.

The Paper Mill Playhouse presented a fully staged production, from November 8, 2006 through December 17, 2006. The production was staged by James Brennan with Tom Helm as music director. It received moderately positive reviews. Theatre Under The Stars produced the work in 2007, and it has received other regional productions.

== Song list ==
Act I

- George's Prayer
- This Year Europe
- One of the Lucky Ones/Can
- You Find Me a House
- In a State
- A Wonderful Life
- If I Had a Wish
- One of the Lucky Ones
- Reprise
- Wings
- Good Night
- Not What I Expected
- Panic at the Loan Building
- A Wonderful Life - Reprise

Act II

- Can You Find Me a House - Reprise
- When You Own Your Own Home
- First Class All the Way
- I Couldn't Be with Anyone but You
- Welcome a Hero
- Christmas Gifts
- Precious Little
- Unborn Sequence
- A Wonderful Life - Reprise
- Welcome the Hero - Reprise
- Christmas Gifts - Reprise
