= The Gould Hotel =

Coordinates: 42.910695°N 76.799319°W

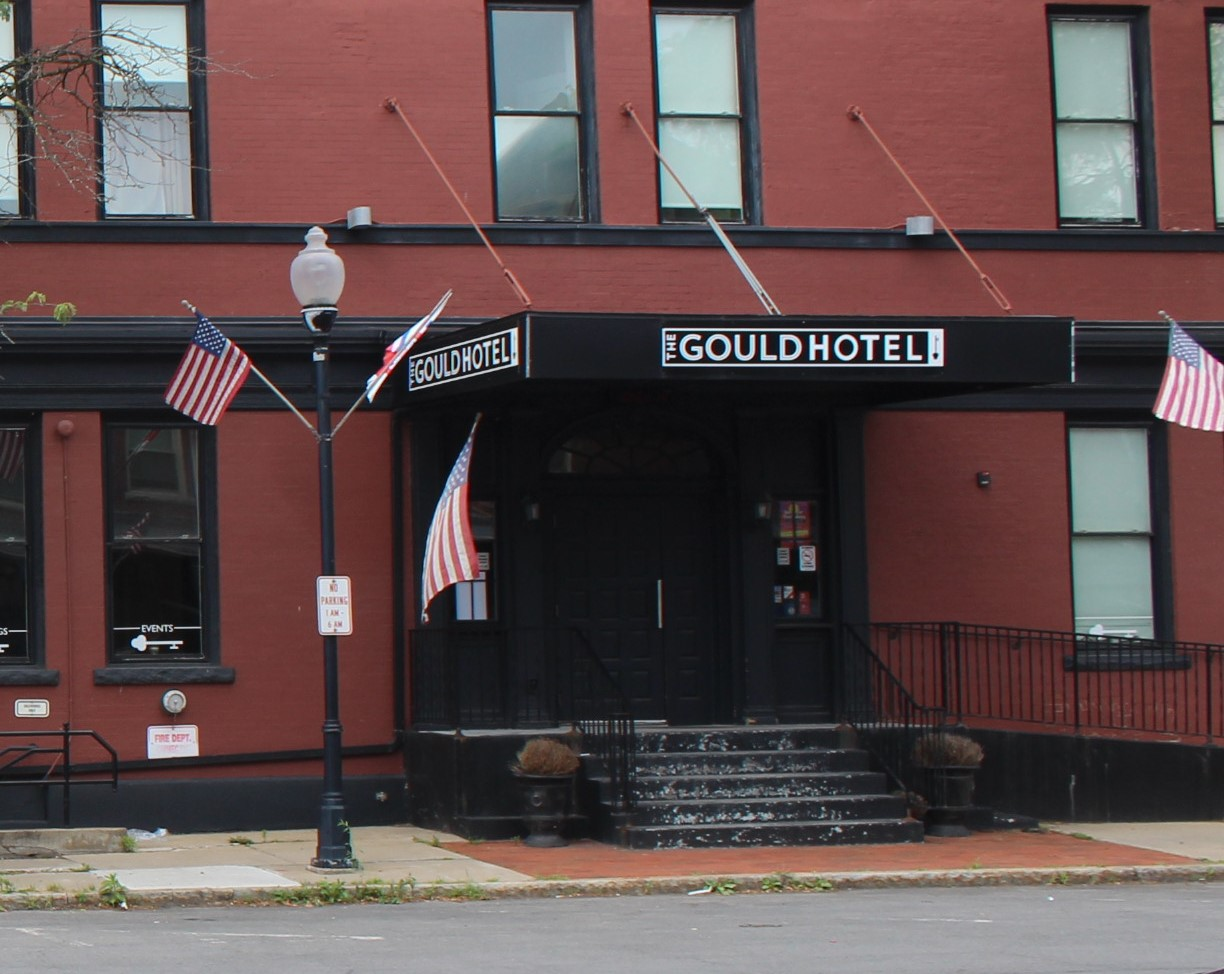
- Interactive map of the The Gould Hotel area

General information
- Type: Hotel
- Location: Seneca Falls, New York, U.S.
- Opened: 1920

The Gould Hotel is a hotel in Seneca Falls, New York. When it was built in 1920 it was described as “the most complete and perfectly equipped of the smaller hotels of New York State." More than 80 years later, a $6.2 million renovation occurred.

For a time it was known as The Hotel Clarence, named after guardian angel Clarence Odbody from the 1946 film It's a Wonderful Life, and residents claim that when director Frank Capra visited this small Upstate New York town in 1945 he was inspired to model the films' town of Bedford Falls after it. The town has an annual "It's a Wonderful Life" festival in December to commemorate its connection to the Hollywood hit.
