= It Happened One Christmas =

- Genre: Comedy; Fantasy
- Based on: It's a Wonderful Life
- Written by: Lionel Chetwynd
- Directed by: Donald Wrye
- Starring: Marlo Thomas; Orson Welles; Wayne Rogers; Cloris Leachman
- Music by: Stephen Lawrence
- Country of origin: United States
- Original language: English

Production
- Producers: Marlo Thomas; Carole Hart
- Cinematography: Conrad Hall
- Editors: Robbe Roberts; Bill Martin
- Running time: 110 minutes
- Production companies: Daisy Productions; Universal Television

Original release
- Network: ABC
- Release: December 11, 1977

It Happened One Christmas is a 1977 American made-for-television Christmas fantasy-comedy-drama film directed by Donald Wrye, starring Marlo Thomas, Wayne Rogers, Orson Welles, and Cloris Leachman. It originally premiered as The ABC Sunday Night Movie on December 11, 1977.

== Plot ==
The film, a gender-reversed version of the 1946 film It's a Wonderful Life, centers on Mary Bailey Hatch, a young woman who dreams of seeing the world but is forced by circumstances to remain in her small hometown as head of the family's Building & Loan business. On a Christmas Eve, in a moment of financial crisis, a severely depressed Mary contemplates suicide, but is rescued by her guardian angel, Clara Oddbody (Cloris Leachman). Clara shows Mary the positive effect that she has had on everyone she has met throughout her life.

== Cast ==
- Marlo Thomas as Mary Bailey Hatch
- Wayne Rogers as George Hatch
- Orson Welles as Henry F. Potter
- Cloris Leachman as Clara Oddbody
- Barney Martin as Uncle Willie
- Karen Carlson as Violet
- Dick O'Neill as Mr. Gower
- Doris Roberts as Ma Bailey
- Richard Dysart as Peter Bailey
- Cliff Norton as Martini
- Archie Hahn as Ernie Baker
- Christopher Guest as CDR Harry Bailey, USN

== Production ==
Lionel Chetwynd's teleplay, directed by Donald Wrye, varies little from the original screenplay, even using most of the original dialogue. Thomas served as executive producer for the project.

Revisions in the script include fleshing out and exploring some of the characters who are citizens of Bedford Falls to a greater extent than in the original. When George, Harry (Mary's brother), and the Hatchs' friends, Bert and Ernie, go off to fight in the World War II, each sends letters to Mary describing their experiences. All four characters are shown in uniform, interspersed with actual war footage. Another brief scene depicts George, wounded in battle and discharged, attempting to readjust to civilian life after the war has ended. The characters of Ma Bailey (played by Doris Roberts), Violet Bick (played by Karen Carlson), and Sam Wainwright (played by an uncredited Jim Lovelett) are practically reduced to bit parts, in contrast to the more full-bodied performances interpreted by Beulah Bondi, Gloria Grahame, and Frank Albertson, respectively, in the 1946 film.

The musical score is by Stephen Lawrence and the cinematography by Conrad Hall.

== Promotion and release ==
The film premiered on Sunday, December 11, 1977, and was an infrequent instance when The ABC Sunday Night Movie showcased a made-for-television film rather than a theatrical release. It was the fourth-most watched prime time television program for the week, with a Nielsen rating of 27.5, or 20 million homes.

== Reception ==
It Happened One Christmas was first broadcast at a time when It's a Wonderful Life was rarely aired on television and, as a result, many viewers were unfamiliar with its source. However, once the original 1946 film returned to the airwaves on an annual basis, the remake slipped into obscurity.

=== Reviews ===
The reviews were mixed. After its initial airing a New York Times follow-up article revealed that Frank Capra, the director of the 1946 film It's A Wonderful Life, had denounced the remake as "plagiaristic." The ratings, however, were good enough that it was rebroadcast on ABC twice, in 1978 and 1979. But by that time the original It's A Wonderful Life had begun its resurgence on television and eventually eclipsed the remake.

== Availability ==
It Happened One Christmas is rarely shown today, and has not, as of 2017, been issued on DVD. It can be viewed at the Paley Center for Media (formerly The Museum of Television & Radio) in New York City and Beverly Hills, California.

== Award nominations ==
Emmy Award nominations (1978):

- Outstanding Supporting Actress in a Limited Series or Movie (Cloris Leachman)
- Outstanding Art Direction for a Miniseries or Movie (John J. Lloyd – Art Director)
- Outstanding Art Direction for a Miniseries or Movie (Hal Gausman – Set Decorator)

== See also ==
- List of Christmas films
- List of films about angels
- Mary Hatch Bailey
