= Bedford Falls =

Bedford Falls may refer to:

- Bedford Falls (It's a Wonderful Life), fictional town in the 1946 film
- Bedford Falls Productions, a TV and film production company
- a fictional town in the 1990 book Better Than Life by Grant Naylor
