= Mary Hatch Bailey =

Fictional character in It's a Wonderful Life

- It's a Wonderful Life character
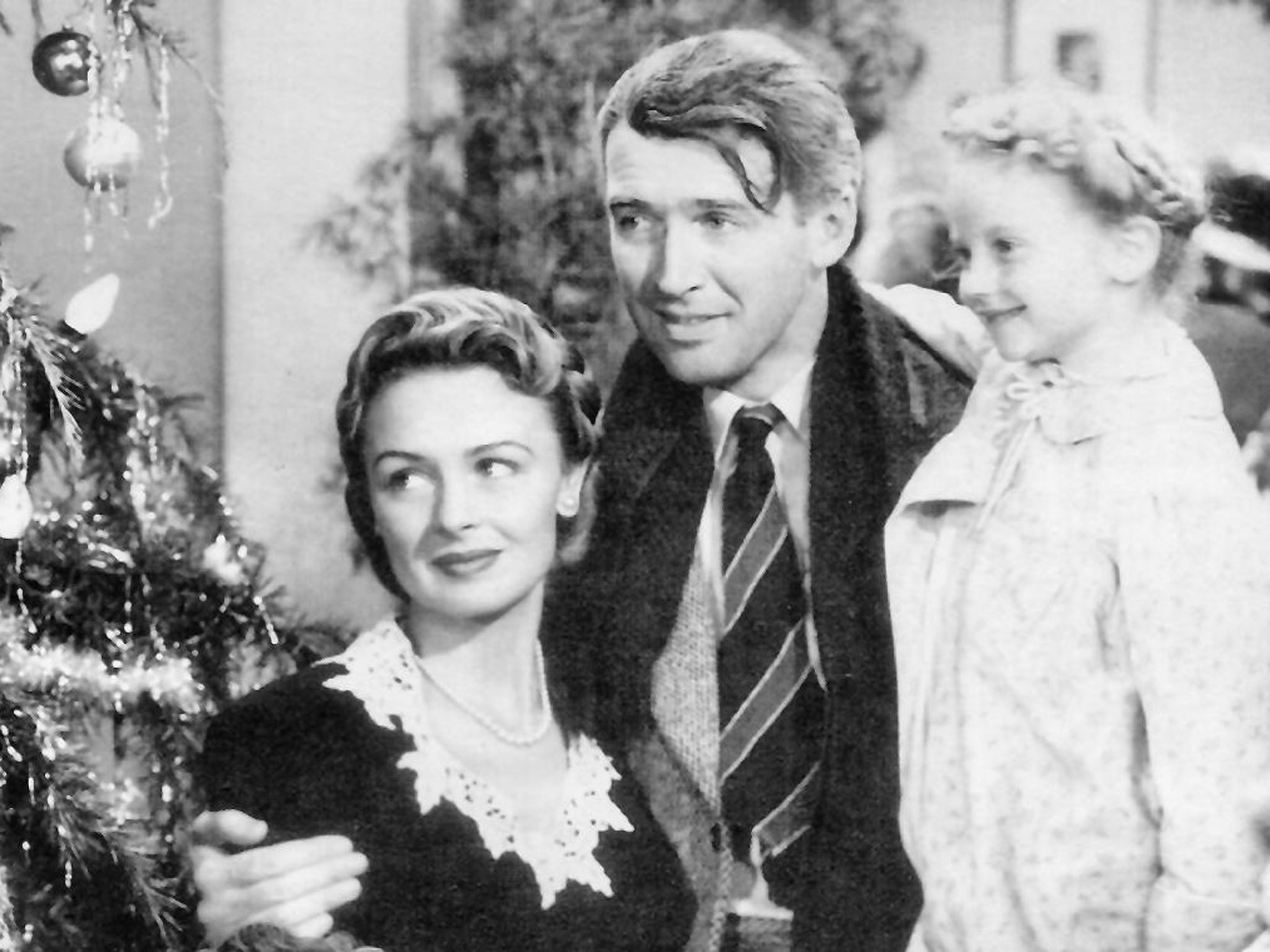
- Donna Reed (left) as Mary Hatch Bailey

In-universe information
- Full name: Mary Hatch Bailey; Born 1910; Bedford Falls, New York, U.S.
- Occupation: Housewife
- Spouses: George Bailey (m. 1932–)
- Children: Pete (born 1934); Janie (born 1935); Zuzu (born 1940); Tommy (born 1941)
- Relatives: Father: Unknown; Mother: J. W. Hatch; Brother: Marty Hatch; Brother-in-law: Harry Bailey; Mother-in-law: Irene Bailey; Father-in-law: Peter Bailey (deceased)

Mary Hatch Bailey is a fictional character in Frank Capra's 1946 film It's a Wonderful Life. She is the sweetheart and later wife of protagonist George Bailey (played by James Stewart as an adult and Bobby Anderson as a child). Mary is played by Donna Reed as an adult and Jean Gale as a child. She is loosely based on Mary Pratt, a character in Philip Van Doren Stern's 1943 short story The Greatest Gift.

Mary Hatch is viewed by some as either the hero of the film or a key, significant, and strong character in the film's story, including its romance.

== Story line ==
Mary Hatch is the younger sister of Marty Hatch, a friend of George Bailey, whom she has loved since childhood. Her first appearance is when she is a little girl in a pharmacy ordering malts with her schoolmate Violet Bick and being waited on by a young George working the soda fountain. George reveals his plans to leave Bedford Falls and be an explorer, inspired by National Geographic. Knowing George's disability from the rescue of his brother, she whispers her love for him in his deaf ear. They become reacquainted as young adults at a high school dance in 1928, where they discuss their respective plans for the future. They are interrupted by news that George's father has suffered a stroke. Mary goes away to college, and works for a time in New York before returning to Bedford Falls.

In 1932, when George's brother Harry returns from college with a new wife, and a job offer from his father-in-law, George realizes he will not be able to leave the Building and Loan, at least in the foreseeable future. George, despite knowing that his friend, Sam Wainwright, is courting Mary, goes to her house at the urging of his mother. George insists that he has no intention of getting married, but realizes that he loves Mary. It is very clear that George's mother is right that Mary loves him and not Sam. Mary herself hints at this by preparing for George's visit by playing their favorite song Buffalo Gals, as well as hanging up a caricature of George lassoing the Moon, reflecting their walk home from the dance.

George and Mary are married, but their planned honeymoon is interrupted by a run on the banks, which affects the Building and Loan. Potter's newly acquired bank has called in its loan, and depositors are clamoring to withdraw their funds. Potter, a stockholder in the Building and Loan, threatens to shut it down if it closes early. Mary offers the money saved for their honeymoon to keep the Building and Loan solvent.

That evening, George's friends Bert the cop and the cab driver Ernie escort him to his "new" home: the Old Granville house, a derelict mansion Mary had wished for years before. Over time they work on repairing the house. During World War II George is exempt from the draft because of partial deafness, but serves as an Air-Raid Warden. Mary becomes a volunteer for the war effort, such as running the local branch of the USO, while raising their four children (Pete, Janie, Tommy, and Zuzu).

In 1945, when George's uncle misplaces an $8,000 deposit, George faces bankruptcy and a charge of embezzlement, leaving his family behind. Angry and depressed, George contemplates suicide. His guardian angel, Clarence Odbody, then shows George what life would have been like had he never been born. Among other changes in this alternate existence, Mary is a spinster librarian.

George returns home to find that Mary has rallied their friends and family to raise the missing money.

== Behind the scenes ==
Donna Reed would later state that It's a Wonderful Life was her favorite film of her career. She also said it was "the most difficult film I ever did. No director ever demanded as much of me." Before Reed got the role, it was offered to Olivia de Havilland, Ginger Rogers, Jean Arthur, and Ann Dvorak.

In the "wishing" scene outside the old Granville house, Capra was surprised to see Reed accurately throw a stone to break a window, a skill she acquired playing baseball with her brothers on their Iowa farm. Capra, according to Jimmy Hawkins, later opined that making Mary a librarian was a mistake.

Mary's character also appeared in a live radio play based on the film, and was played by Ariel Woodiwiss.

Some fans of the film have cosplayed as Mary, including those in Seneca Falls, New York, which the film's fictional town of Bedford Falls is reportedly based on.

== See also ==
- It Happened One Christmas, 1977 film

== Sources ==
- Rhys, Morgan (2012). "The Internet Movie Database," Mary Hatch Biography
