= Young People (1940 film) =

1940 film by Allan Dwan

- Theatrical release poster
- Directed by: Allan Dwan
- Starring: Shirley Temple
- Cinematography: Edward Cronjager; Arthur C. Miller
- Edited by: James B. Clark
- Music by: Harry Warren, Mack Gordon
- Production company: Twentieth Century-Fox Film Corporation
- Distributed by: Twentieth Century-Fox Film Corporation
- Release date: August 23, 1940; (New York City)
- Running time: 70 minutes
- Country: United States
- Language: English

Young People is a 1940 American musical drama film directed by Allan Dwan and starring Shirley Temple and Jack Oakie. This would be Shirley's final film as a child actress.

== Plot ==
Believing that it is good for their adopted daughter Wendy (Shirley Temple), Joe Ballantine (Jack Oakie) and his wife Kit (Charlotte Greenwood) decide to retire their vaudeville act and move the family to a small New England town. However, despite Wendy's many attempts to charm the locals, the "show folk" are given the cold shoulder. That is, until a hurricane hits the town, and because of the generosity, strength and conviction in the face of disaster, it appears that the troupers just might win over the residents in their new hometown after all.

== Cast ==
- Shirley Temple as Wendy Ballantine
  - Young Wendy is portrayed by an uncredited lookalike; the film incorporates archive footage from Curly Top and Stand Up and Cheer! to depict a young Wendy
- Jack Oakie as Joe Ballentine
- Charlotte Greenwood as Kit Ballentine
- Arleen Whelan as Judith
- George Montgomery as Mike Shea
- Kathleen Howard as Hester Appleby
- Minor Watson as Dakin
- Frank Swann as Fred Willard
- Frank Sully as Jeb
- Mae Marsh as Maria Liggett
- Sarah Edwards as Mrs Stinchfield
- Irving Bacon as Otis
- Charles Haltin as Moderator
- Arthur Aylesworth as Doorman
- Olin Howard as Station Manager
- Harry Tyler as Dave
- Darryl Hickman as Tommy
- Shirley Mills as Mary Ann
- Diane Fisher as Susie
- Bobby Anderson as Jerry Dakin

== Reception ==
Bosley Crowther of The New York Times wrote, "For patrons who can take so much precocity, it should be one of the more charming of the miracle child's films. Mr. Oakie and Miss Greenwood make a couple of amusing hoofers, and there are several nice songs to catch the ear. If this is really the end, it is not a bad exit at all for little Shirley, the superannuated sunbeam. But we rather suspect she'll be back." Variety wrote that the film "makes up in tunefulness and spontaneity what it lacks on the story side ... Miss Temple, relieved of the responsibility of carrying the entire picture on her shoulders, drops neatly into the groove assigned her." Film Daily wrote, "Shirley Temple's latest and last offering for 20th-Century Fox is loaded with entertainment and finds the youngster as appealing and attractive as ever." Harrison's Reports wrote, "Good! Although the story is lightweight, it has plentiful human interest, a few good musical numbers, comedy, and engaging performances." "Miss Temple has obviously retired in the full tide of her powers," John Mosher wrote in The New Yorker. "In 'Young People,' her swan song, so to speak, she shows no weariness, no slacking up, no arthritic pangs."

As with Temple's previous film, The Blue Bird, Young People was a box office disappointment.
