= The Greatest Gift =

1943 short story by Philip Van Doren Stern

- Short story by Philip Van Doren Stern
- Country: United States
- Language: English
- Genre: Fantasy

Publication
- Publisher: Cluster Publishing Ltd
- Media type: Print (hardback)
- Publication date: 1943 (written); 1944 (published)
- Pages: 48 pp

"The Greatest Gift" is a 1943 short story written by Philip Van Doren Stern, loosely based on the Charles Dickens 1843 novella A Christmas Carol, which became the basis for the film It's a Wonderful Life (1946). It was self-published as a booklet in 1943 and published as a book in 1944.

== Plot summary ==
George Pratt, a man who is dissatisfied with his life, contemplates suicide. As he stands on a bridge on Christmas Eve, he is approached by a strange, unpleasantly dressed but well-mannered man with a bag. The man strikes up a conversation, and George tells the man that he wishes he had never been born. The man tells him his wish has been granted and that he was never born. The man tells George he should take the bag with him and pretend to be a door-to-door brush salesman if anyone addresses him.

George returns to his town and discovers that no one knows him. His friends have taken different and often worse paths through life due to his absence. His little brother, whom he had saved from death in a swimming accident, perished without George to rescue him. George finds the woman he knows as his wife married to someone else. He offers her a complimentary upholstery brush, but he is forced to leave the house by her husband. Their son pretends to shoot him with a toy cap gun, and shouts, "You're dead. Why won't you die?"

George returns to the bridge and questions the strange man. The man explains that George wanted more when he had already been given the greatest gift of all: the gift of life. George digests the lesson and begs the man to return his life. The man agrees. George returns home and finds everything restored to normal. He hugs his wife and tells her that he thought he had lost her. She is confused. As he is about to explain, his hand bumps a brush on the sofa behind him. Without turning around, George knows the brush was the one he had presented to her earlier.

== History ==
Stern finished the 4,100 word short story in 1943 after writing an outline in February 1938 and working on the story since November 1939. Unable to find a publisher, he sent the 200 copies he had printed as a 21-page booklet to friends as Christmas presents in December 1943. The story came to the attention of RKO Pictures producer David Hempstead, who showed it to actor Cary Grant. Grant became interested in playing the lead role. RKO purchased the motion picture rights for $10,000 in April 1944. After several screenwriters worked on adaptations, RKO sold the rights to the story in 1945 to Frank Capra's production company for the same $10,000, which he adapted into It's a Wonderful Life.

The story was first published as a book in December 1944, with illustrations by Rafaello Busoni. Stern also sold it to Reader's Scope magazine, which published the story in its December 1944 issue, and to the magazine Good Housekeeping, which published it under the title The Man Who Was Never Born in its January 1945 issue (published in December 1944).

According to the American Film Institute and Turner Classic Movies, Stern did not copyright the story until 1945, when he sold the film rights. However, copyright records show that Stern submitted a copyright application in December 1943 with the self-publication of the pamphlet/greeting card. Stern renewed the copyright in 1971, the 28th year after the publication of the original December 1943 booklets. Republic Pictures has used the belated copyright on the original story to enforce an indirect copyright on It's a Wonderful Life, which entered the public domain in 1975 despite not owning the copyright of the original story.

== Film ==
At the suggestion of RKO studio chief Charles Koerner, Frank Capra read The Greatest Gift and immediately saw its film potential. In 1945, RKO, anxious to unload the project, sold the rights to Capra's production company, Liberty Films, which had a nine-film distribution agreement with RKO, for $10,000, and threw in three script adaptations for free. Capra claimed the script was purchased for $50,000. Capra, along with writers Frances Goodrich and Albert Hackett, with Jo Swerling, Michael Wilson, and Dorothy Parker brought in to "polish" the script, turned the story and fragments from the three scripts into a screenplay that Capra renamed It's a Wonderful Life. The script underwent many revisions throughout pre-production and during filming. Final screenplay credit went to Goodrich, Hackett and Capra, with "additional scenes" by Jo Swerling.

In the film, the main character (renamed George Bailey) was played by James Stewart, the stranger (re-imagined as an angel named Clarence Odbody) was played by Henry Travers, and George's wife (renamed Mary Hatch) was played by Donna Reed. The names for some characters in the film were taken from characters in the story, but given different personalities or roles in the story (e.g., Mr. Potter owned a photography studio in the story, but was a conniving banker in the film). In the reality in which George was never born, Mary never marries in the film, but in the story she marries a man named Art Jenkins.

== Editions ==
- The greatest gift : a Christmas tale / Philip Van Doren Stern; with an afterword by Marguerite Stern Robinson; illustrations by Andrew Davidson, First Simon & Schuster hardcover edition 1943, New York : Simon & Schuster, 2014, ISBN 978-1-4767-7886-0

== See also ==
- List of Christmas-themed literature
