= Clarence Odbody =

Guardian angel in It's a Wonderful Life

- It's a Wonderful Life character
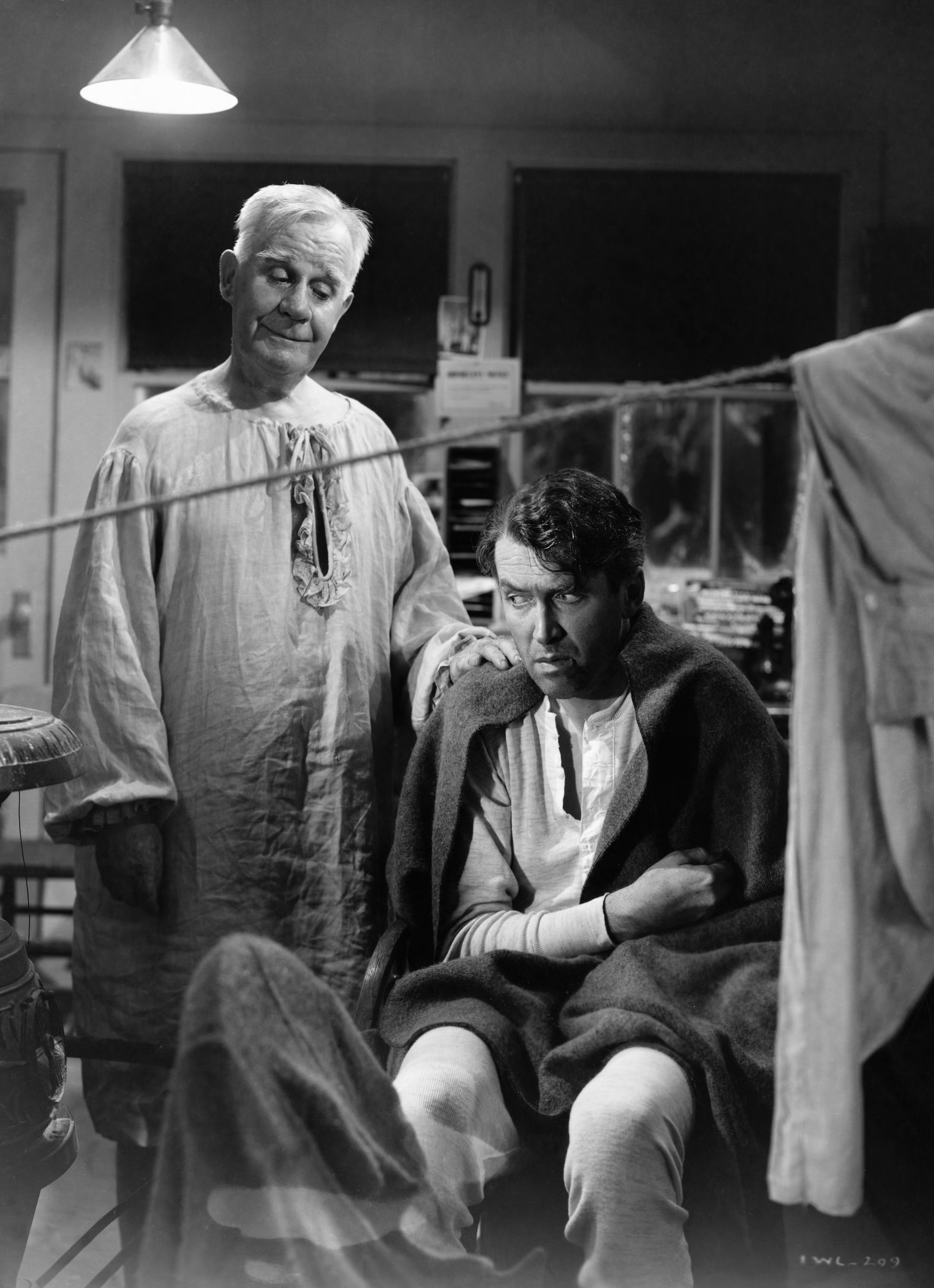
- Henry Travers portrayed guardian angel Clarence Odbody in Frank Capra's 1946 film It's a Wonderful Life

In-universe information
- Full name: Clarence Odbody, AS2
- Occupation: Clockmaker; Guardian Angel

Clarence Odbody, also spelled Clarence Oddbody (born May 1653, died 1745) is a guardian angel character in Frank Capra's 1946 film It's a Wonderful Life, where he was portrayed by Henry Travers, and in the 1990 sequel, Clarence, where he was played by Robert Carradine.

Odbody is loosely based on "a stranger" in Philip Van Doren Stern's 1943 short story The Greatest Gift.

In 1977's It Happened One Christmas, a remake of the 1946 film, a gender-reversed Clarence appeared as Clara Oddbody, played by Cloris Leachman. The 1986 musical A Wonderful Life features Odbody, who was played by David Hyde Pierce in its 2005 rendition.

In the 1946 film, Odbody is the implied subject when, in the well-known quote, Zuzu Bailey (played by Karolyn Grimes) says "Every time a bell rings, an angel gets his wings."

== Biography ==
=== In It's a Wonderful Life ===
On Christmas Eve, 1945, George Bailey, a banker in the town of Bedford Falls facing financial ruin and disgrace, is contemplating committing suicide by jumping off a bridge into an icy river because the payout on his $15,000 life insurance policy would solve the problems confronting his business and family. Shortly before this, many in the community of Bedford Falls sense George's dismay and offer prayers. Two celestial beings hear all these prayers as well as observe George's intent to kill himself, and decide to send an angel to save him. For this task, the only available angel is Clarence Odbody, an AS2 (Angel Second Class), who after 200 years has yet to win his wings. To prepare for this assignment, Clarence is shown several scenes from George's life that show some of his selfless acts. Sent to Earth, Clarence finds George standing on a bridge about to leap into the river. Before George can jump off, Clarence jumps in the water, which prompts George to dive in to rescue him. Both are rescued by the bridge keeper, who allows them to dry off in his shack.

As Clarence dries off, he reveals he is an angel (causing the tollkeeper to flee in fear), but George is still unconvinced and believes that if killing himself is such a bad idea, maybe everybody would be better off if he had never been born in the first place. Clarence sees to this (presumably appealing to his superiors, as he shouts to the sky "You don't have to make all that fuss about it."), and this transforms the snowiness into a windy night.

George discovers that a great many things and people are not better off from his absence. His Uncle Billy, formerly in charge of the Bailey Building and Loan, lost his business when he accidentally gave the day's receipts to Potter in a folded-up newspaper, had a nervous breakdown, and spent the rest of his life in an insane asylum.

His mother was embittered and ran a boardinghouse for the perpetually down-and-out. His war-hero brother, Harry, had fallen through creek ice and drowned as a child, as George was not there to save him. As a result, the soldiers Harry saved from two Kamikaze planes died as well.

He sees that his old boss Emil Gower, the town druggist, had accidentally poisoned the child's prescription and is now a derelict hobo, shunned by everyone after having served twenty years in prison for manslaughter. George was not around to prevent Gower's deadly mistake when he worked there.

George finds that his alternate timeline wife, Mary Hatch, is a spinster librarian. Violet, a girl who formerly had a crush on George, has never received the compassion and help George had given her. Without his kindness, she became stuck in the cruel sex industry: treated horribly in life by men who were not at all like George. Then there is Ernie the cabbie and Bert the cop, both divorced, poor and miserable, living in barely habitable shacks in Potter's Field, the most derelict area of town. Clarence tells George that he was not there to build Bailey Park, where hardworking people could live in dignity with their families.

George finds that the town has been renamed "Pottersville" in honor of the wealthy but heartless Henry F. Potter, who appears to have taken over Bedford Falls and turned it into a sleazy and dangerous place filled with whiskey bars, crime, pawnshops, violence, seedy entertainment establishments, and unhappy people with meaningless, amoral lives.

As George comes to realize the disaster that would befall all those he loves if he had never lived, he desperately desires to return to his life, even though it means he would be going to jail. George is then restored to his previous life, a life which he now enthusiastically embraces. He returns to his home, where all his family and friends are gathering to give George whatever is needed to make up for what Mr. Potter stole, culminating in an advance of $25,000 from his wealthy industrialist friend Sam Wainwright. Clarence hides his copy of The Adventures of Tom Sawyer on the tree where George will find it first. The dedication reads "Thanks for the wings!" whereupon a bell on the family Christmas Tree rings, signifying the feat.

=== In Clarence ===
In the 1990 film Clarence, in December 1989, Clarence again comes to Earth to assist a human, Rachel Logan, who is in need of his care. Asked to help her by a fellow angel, Logan's deceased husband, he assists her to again appreciate life and her children, and saves her from suicide by bringing her to heaven for a brief visit with her husband. During his time on Earth he also shows that he has the power to take on the looks of a human, in this case, Rachel's son Brent, whom he portrays so the boy does not get expelled from high school.

== Quotes ==
- "Strange, isn't it? Each man's life touches so many other lives, and when he isn't around he leaves an awful hole, doesn't he?"
- "You see, George, you've really had a wonderful life. Don't you see what a mistake it would be to throw it away?"
- In the 1946 film, Clarence tells Nick the bartender that his age is "two hundred and ninety three, uhh, next May". In Clarence, he reveals that he was born in Boston.
- After George Bailey's life is restored to him in the 1946 film, he runs through Bedford Falls and passes the Bijou movie theater. The theater marquee shows that the film that was playing on Christmas Eve in 1945 was The Bells of St. Mary's, in which Henry Travers co-starred as Horace P. Bogardus.

== 2011 novel ==
The Last Temptation of Clarence Odbody is a 2011 novel written by John Pierson which imagines the future lives of various It's a Wonderful Life characters if George had not survived his jump into the river.

== See also ==
- List of films about angels
