= Honeychile =

1951 film by R. G. Springsteen

- Theatrical release poster
- Directed by: R. G. Springsteen
- Screenplay by: Charles E. Roberts; Jack Townley; Barry Trivers
- Produced by: Sidney Picker
- Starring: Judy Canova; Eddie Foy, Jr. Alan Hale, Jr. Walter Catlett; Claire Carleton; Karolyn Grimes
- Cinematography: Jack A. Marta
- Edited by: Richard L. Van Enger
- Music by: Victor Young
- Production company: Republic Pictures
- Distributed by: Republic Pictures
- Release date: October 20, 1951
- Running time: 89 minutes
- Country: United States
- Language: English
- Budget: $352,172
- Box office: $577,857

Honeychile is a 1951 American comedy film directed by R. G. Springsteen, written by Charles E. Roberts, Jack Townley and Barry Trivers and starring Judy Canova, Eddie Foy, Jr., Alan Hale, Jr., Walter Catlett, Claire Carleton and Karolyn Grimes. The film was released on October 20, 1951 by Republic Pictures.

== Cast ==
- Judy Canova as Judy Canova
- Eddie Foy, Jr. as Eddie Price
- Alan Hale, Jr. as Joe Boyd
- Walter Catlett as Al Moore
- Claire Carleton as Betty Loring
- Karolyn Grimes as Effie
- Brad Morrow as Larry
- Roy Barcroft as Walter Judson
- Leonid Kinskey as Chick Lister
- Gus Schilling as Window Washer
- Irving Bacon as Abner
- Fuzzy Knight as Ice Cream Vendor
- Roscoe Ates as Bob
- Ida Moore as Harriet
- Sarah Edwards as Sarah
- Emory Parnell as Mayor
- Dick Elliott as Sheriff
- Dick Wessel as Bartender
- William Fawcett as Ben Todd
- Robin Winans as Boy
- Stanley Blystone as Mr. Olson
- Donia Bussey as Mrs. Olson
- John Crawford as Marvin McKay
- Cecil Elliott as Woman
- Cecil Weston as Woman

== Reception ==
After accounting for the costs of distribution, advertising and prints, the film recorded a loss of $182,795.
