= Karolyn Grimes =

American actress (born 1940)

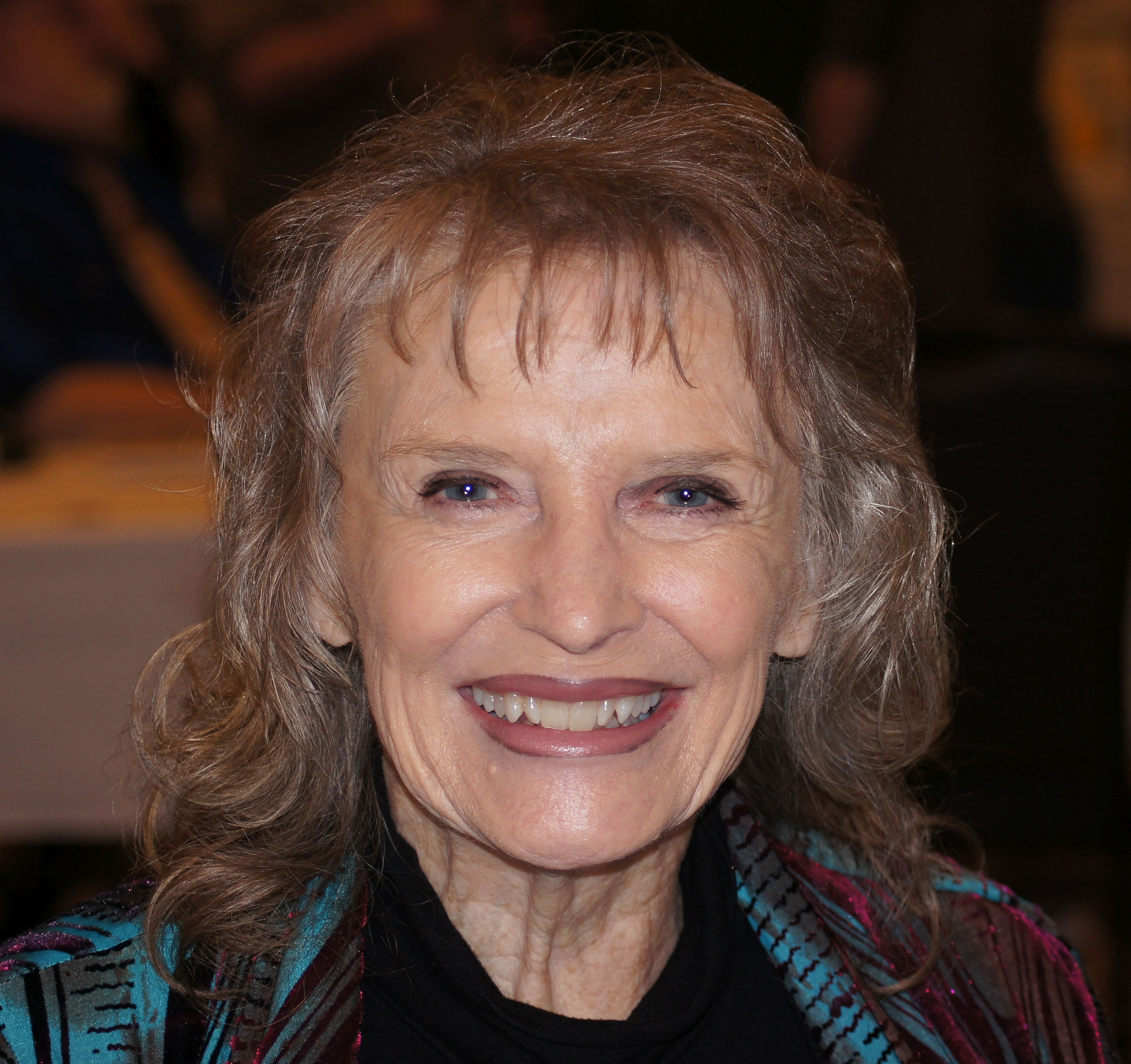
- Grimes in 2019
- Born: July 4, 1940 (age 86); Hollywood, California, U.S.
- Occupation: Actress
- Years active: 1945–1954, 2016, 2020
- Notable work: It's a Wonderful Life (1946) and The Bishop's Wife (1947)
- Spouse(s): Hal Barnes (m. 19??; div. 19??) Mike Wilkerson (m. 1968; died 1993)
- Children: 4

Karolyn Grimes (born July 4, 1940) is an American actress. She is best known for her role as Zuzu Bailey in the 1946 Frank Capra film It's a Wonderful Life, delivering the film's famous line "Every time a bell rings, an angel gets his wings". She also played Debby Brougham in the 1947 film The Bishop's Wife.

== Early life ==
Grimes was born in Hollywood, California. Her father worked as a store manager for Safeway. From an early age her mother took her for all sorts of lessons, training in violin, piano, singing and dance, and took her to auditions. However, when Grimes was 8, her mother's health began to decline. She was suffering from early onset Alzheimer's disease, an aggressive form of the malady. Six years later she died, at the age of 44. Grimes was just 14 years old at the time. Without her mother she was unable to continue in acting. The following year her father was killed in an automobile accident, and Karolyn was an orphan at the age of 15. By ruling of the District Court, she was sent from Hollywood to live with her uncle and his wife in Osceola, Missouri. It was a very difficult adjustment for her. Life in rural Missouri was a far cry from life in southern California, and her aunt was strict, mean and unstable. Karolyn adjusted to the changes, and found support from among the townspeople, who were aware of what she was going through. She attended the University of Central Missouri and became a medical technologist.

== Career ==
Grimes' film debut came when she was 6 months old. She first attracted attention playing Fred MacMurray's daughter in 1945's Pardon My Past. Her most famous role came as Zuzu in It's a Wonderful Life in 1946. The following year she appeared in six pictures, most notably as the daughter of David Niven and Loretta Young in The Bishop's Wife.

In total, Grimes starred in 16 motion pictures as a child actor; however, it is as Zuzu that she is best remembered. She was honored as a famous Missourian with a star on the Missouri Walk of Fame in Marshfield, Missouri. She also received the city's highest honor, the Edwin P. Hubble Medal of Initiative in 2007 at the annual Marshfield Cherry Blossom Festival.

Every year since 2001 Karolyn Grimes has visited the town of Seneca Falls, New York believed to be the real life inspiration for the film It's a Wonderful Life.' She has headlined the Town's annual 'It's a Wonderful Life Festival for 23 times as of 2025. Fellow film co-stars Jimmy Hawkins, Carol Coombs, and Jeanine Roose have also appeared alongside her at various times.

During the summer of 2018 Karolyn Grimes filmed a documentary entitled Angels Among Us using the town of Seneca Falls as a starting point for a journey around the world to discover real life people who are living like angels-in-training by helping others. The documentary features cameo appearances from fellow It's a Wonderful Life actors Hawkins, Coombs and Roose. A special 45 minute version of the documentary was shown at the It's a Wonderful Life Festival and via Prime Video and Spectrum Cable twice between 2019 and 2021. It will be rereleased in full length in 2026 in honor of It's a Wonderful Life's 80th Anniversary.

In 2019 the first season of a follow-up series also entitled Angels Among Us was filmed at MPT, the PBS affiliate in Baltimore, MD. Production of future episodes ceased due to covid. The series is not currently available on DVD or streaming.

Starting in 2024, Grimes launched a radio show and podcast with her partner Dr. Chris Brunell entitled Zuzu All Grown Up in which she interviews do-good-ers who are "earning their wings" and explores topics about makes a wonderful life both of which topics pay tribute to the film. More than 150 episodes of the series have been produced which concluded its second season on January, 7, 2026, with a third season set for an early Spring 2026 debut. The series airs on various platforms include IHeart Radio, Spotify, Roku, Apple Podcasts and Amazon Fire devices. url=https://www.zuzunetwork.com

== Personal life ==
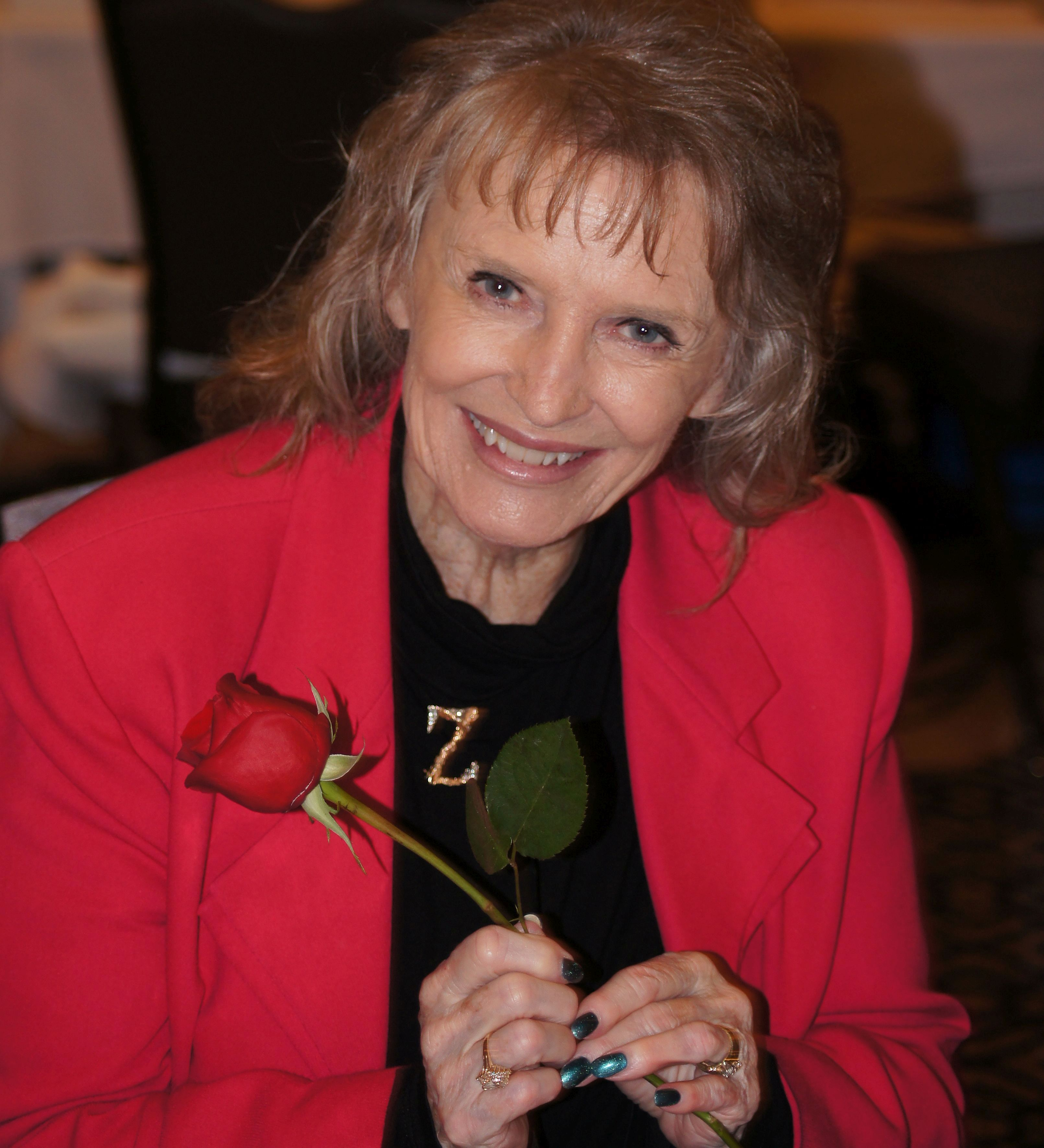
Grimes in 2019

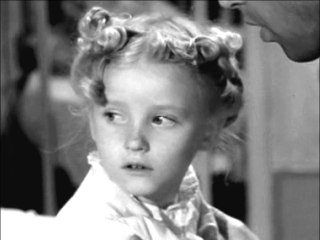
Grimes in It's a Wonderful Life, 1946

She married, had two children, divorced, married again to a man with three children, and then had two more children with her second husband. Renewed interest in It's a Wonderful Life in the early 1980s led Jimmy Stewart to wonder what had happened to the little girl who had played "ZuZu". Grimes was 39 years old by the time Stewart's secretary tracked her down.

Her youngest child took his own life at age 18, and a few years later her second husband died of cancer. In the mid-1980s she began receiving cards and letters from fans who loved It's a Wonderful Life. Repeated showings on local and cable television each holiday season created a broad base of admirers, and the movie became a perennial holiday favorite. After the death of her second husband, she came to appreciate the depth of the film, particularly the deep desperation portrayed by Stewart. The struggles George Bailey faced seemed echoed in the hardships of her own life. She took the movie's message to heart, and came to be a strong advocate for the film. Grimes has been closely tied to the movie, as the character she portrayed uttered one of cinema's most famous lines: "Look, Daddy. Teacher says, 'Every time a bell rings, an angel gets his wings.'"

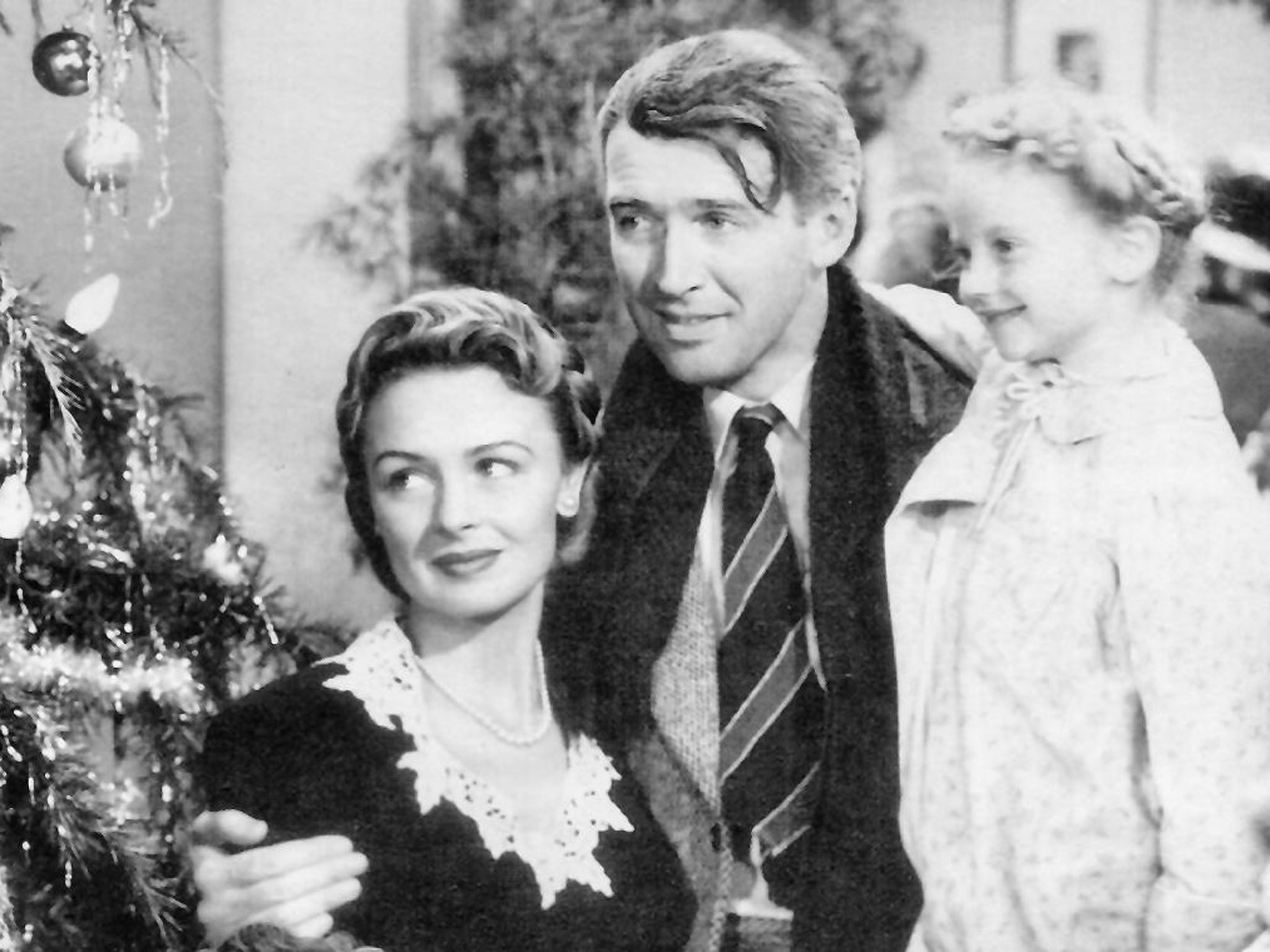
Donna Reed, James Stewart and Karolyn Grimes in It's a Wonderful Life (1946)

Grimes has been called upon to introduce the film at screenings nationwide, meeting with people and signing autographs for those who had come to love the picture and its portrayal of hope. In the 1990s, the Target store chain chose "It's a Wonderful Life" as its marketing theme for Christmas, and contracted with a number of the actors to be store ambassadors. "They reunited the Bailey kids and we went on tour all over the United States," Grimes said. "It was fabulous. I had the best time ever. I didn't realize how much people loved this film. They seemed to just embrace us so much and put us in their hearts."

Through her speaking engagements, she met a psychologist who worked at the Benedict House, a homeless shelter in the Bremerton area, whom she married. Grimes moved to the Seattle area. She continues to be invited to big-screen showings of It's a Wonderful Life at dinner theaters worldwide, where she is asked to share stories of her memories of Jimmy Stewart, Donna Reed and the making of the picture. In addition, she appears annually at the "It's a Wonderful Life" event held in Seneca Falls, New York, the town that inspired Bedford Falls in the film. She also wrote a holiday cookbook with recipes interspersed with pictures and stories of her time on the set of the movie. In 2023 she recited her famous line "Every time a bell rings, an angel gets his wings" for the Christmas single "A Day in the Life of a Christmas Tree", by Danish singer, Anders Knudsen.

== Filmography ==
=== Film ===
Year	Title	Role	Notes
1945	That Night with You	Orphan	Uncredited
1945	Pardon My Past	Stephanie Pemberton	
1946	Sister Kenny	Carolyn	Scenes deleted
1946	Blue Skies	Mary Elizabeth Adams	
1946	It's a Wonderful Life	Zuzu Bailey	
1947	Sweet and Low	Tammie	Short film
1947	Philo Vance's Gamble	Pat Roberts	Uncredited
1947	The Private Affairs of Bel Ami	Laurine de Marelle	
1947	Mother Wore Tights	Iris, age 6	Uncredited
1947	Unconquered	Little Girl	Uncredited
1947	The Bishop's Wife	Debby Brougham	
1948	Albuquerque	Myrtle Walton	Also known as Silver City
1949	Lust for Gold	Martha Bannister	Also known as For Those Who Dare
1950	Rio Grande	Margret Mary	
1951	Honeychile	Effie	
1952	Hans Christian Andersen	Copenhagen Match Girl	Uncredited
2020	Canaan Land	Talk Show Guest	First film in 68 years
2026	Jimmy	cameo	Biopic about Jimmy Stewart

=== Television ===
Year	Title	Role	Notes
1953	Fireside Theatre		Episode: "His Name Is Jason"
1954	The Ford Television Theatre		Episode: "The Good of His Soul"
2016	Cassandra's Castle	Sister Bernadice	First acting role in 62 years
