= Bedford Falls (It's a Wonderful Life) =

- Fictional town
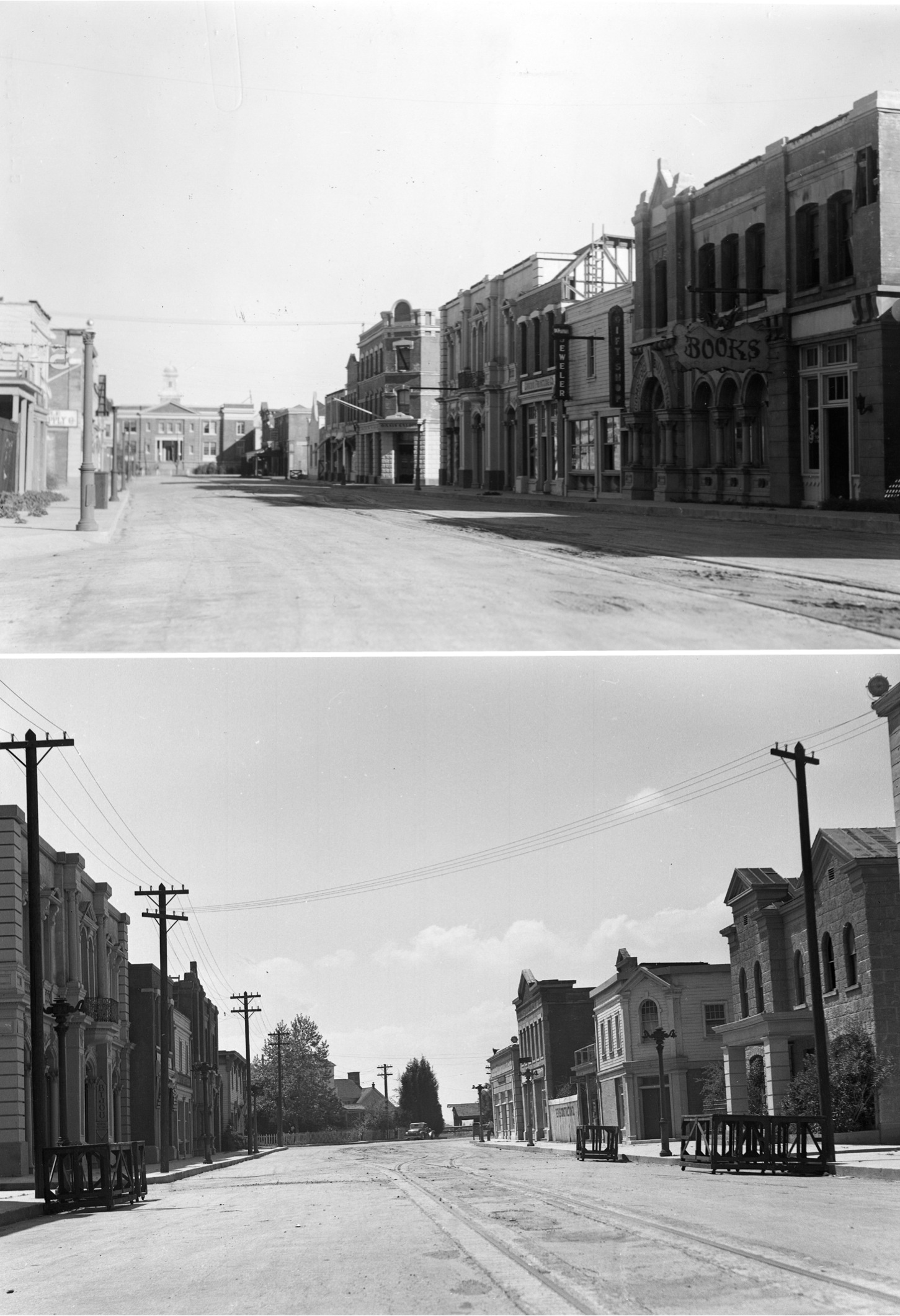
- Top: Genesee Street looking toward the courthouse. Bottom: Genesee Street looking toward the Station. Shots used in the film Cimarron (1931).
- Country: United States of America
- State: New York
- County: Bedford County
- Website: www.therealbedfordfalls.com

Bedford Falls is the fictional town in which Philip Van Doren Stern's 1943 short booklet The Greatest Gift, and RKO Pictures 1946 film adaptation It's a Wonderful Life, are set.

== Inspiration ==
In 1945, Frank Capra visited Seneca Falls, New York to look for inspiration for the town of Bedford Falls.

The name Bedford Falls derives from both Seneca Falls and a hamlet in Westchester County, New York, called Bedford Hills. Evidence that Bedford Hills served as the geographic inspiration for Bedford Falls comes from a photograph of a scene that was not included in the movie. The photograph shows the character of George Bailey running along the snow covered roads of Main Street, past a sign indicating nearby towns. The towns -- Katonah, NY, Chappaqua, NY, Aspetuck, CT, and Kitchawan, NY—lie to the north, south, east, and west, respectively, relative to Bedford Hills.

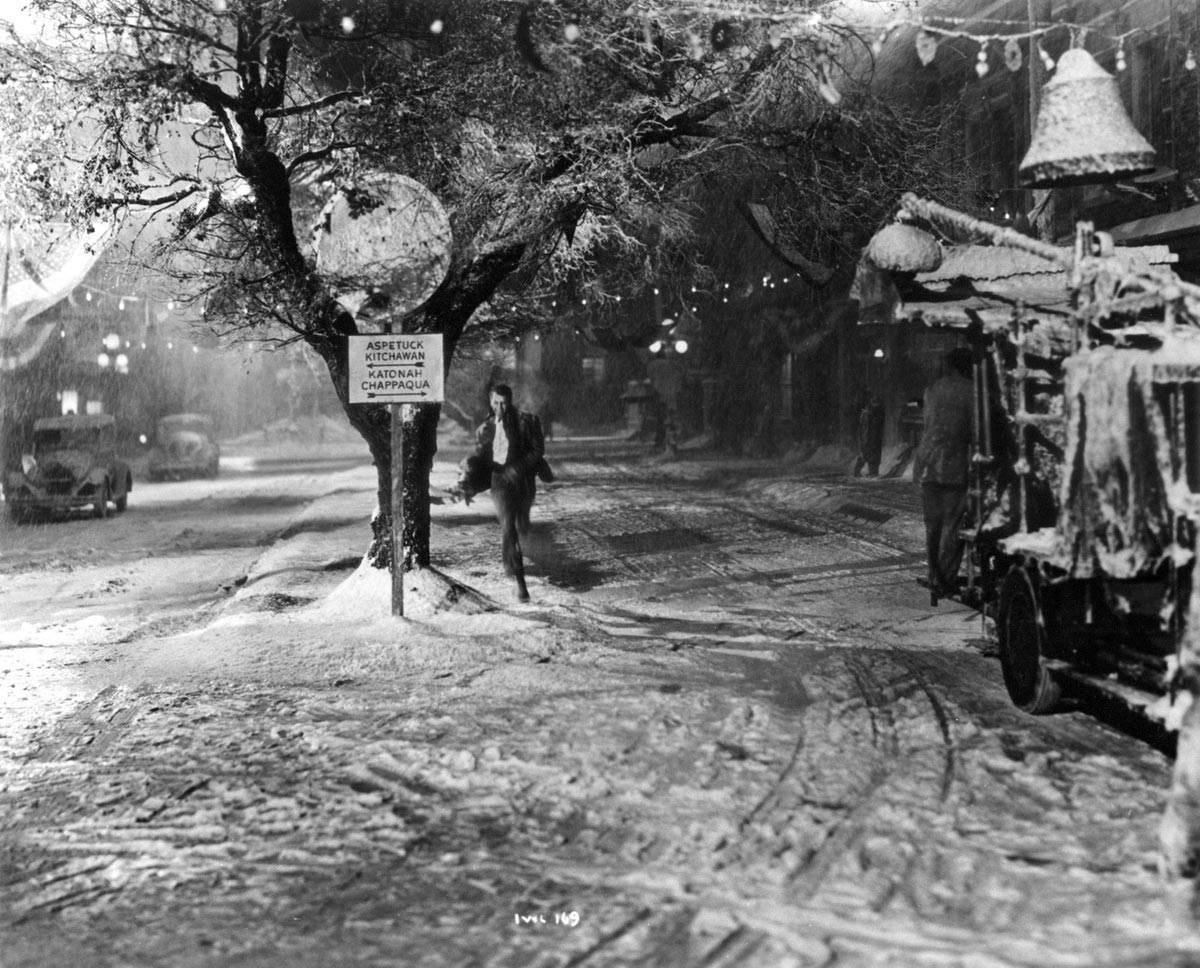
On-set photograph of Jimmy Stewart in the 1946 film It's a Wonderful Life. The scene, which shows a street sign indicating nearby towns, was not used in the film.

Locations indicated on an on-set street sign from It's a Wonderful Life. Bedford Hill, New York

The real town and the fictional town are very similar as they are both mill towns, they both had a grassy median down the main street (Seneca Falls does not anymore), both communities boast Victorian architecture and a large Italian population, and they both have very similar toll bridges. The locations are both close to Buffalo, Elmira, and Rochester, New York.

In Seneca Falls, there was a local businessman named Norman J. Gould, who owned Gould Pumps, and was one of the richest men in town. Gould also had great control over politics and economics of the area, much as Henry F. Potter did in the film.

The Bailey family and the Building and Loan may have been inspired by the George B. Bailey Insurance Agency. Located in Dryden, NY, the Agency was founded in 1936 by George Bailey and was later run by his son, Billy.

== Streets and locations ==
=== Genesee Street ===
Genesee Street is the main road through Bedford Falls. At the north end is a courthouse with a street heading east down Bridge Street, which departs the town. The street is 300 yards long, with over 30 stores and buildings, including a public library, a dance academy, a trust and savings bank, an emporium, a Western Union and American Airlines office, a barber shop, a florist, a beauty shop, a bakery, an antique shop, a "World Luggage and Sports Shop", a hardware store, a candy shop, an art store, a music store, and a theater (Bijou Theater).

There is also a drug store (Gower's Drugs), a toy shop, a meat market, a newspaper office (the Bedford Falls Sentinel), a tailor's shop, a bicycle shop, a garage, a bowling alley and pool house, a hotel, a grocery, two cafés (including the Tiptop Café), a bonds store, a gas company, a telephone exchange, a police station and a building and loan (Bailey Brothers) that George (James Stewart) ends up running with his Uncle Billy (Thomas Mitchell) after George's father dies.

Down the center of the street, there is a tree-lined parkway with fifteen oak trees. The parkway is split off into three, as two roads cut through Genesee Street. One is Jefferson Avenue, which goes to the high school and Potter's Field, and the other is Washington Avenue. At the south side of the town, a road heads east, to New England and Sycamore streets. Another road goes southwest to the railway station.

The Bailey Building and Loan is at the corner of Genesee Street and Jefferson Avenue.

The real Genesee Street, although non-continuous, stretches from Utica, NY to Buffalo, mostly along the route of New York State Route 5.

=== New England Street and Sycamore Avenue ===
New England Street holds eight residential houses. One house belongs to Peter (Samuel S. Hinds) and Ma Bailey (Beulah Bondi) and is where George and his younger brother, Harry, grew up as kids.

Sycamore Avenue holds six properties. One of them was where Mary (Donna Reed) grew up. Another house down the street is 320 Sycamore, known as the Old Granville House. It was an abandoned house that became known to youngsters as the place to throw rocks at, and if you smashed a window you could make a wish. Both George and Mary threw rocks at the house after a high school party.

George wished for a future of traveling and becoming an architect. Mary wouldn't tell George her wish but later in the film she told him she had wished to marry him and live in the house. The wish actually came true when in 1932, on the night of George and Mary's wedding, she bought it as their home. Through the years they redecorated the house, raised four children there, and lived the rest of their lives in the house.

=== Bridge Street ===
Bridge Street is at the north side of the town and connects to Genesee Street from the east next to the courthouse and runs out of the town via a toll bridge. Many other residents live up Bridge Street including the man who owns the tree George drives his car into when drunk. It is also the location of Giuseppe Martini's bar called "Martini's" (Romeo Restaurant), and behind the bar is the town's canal.

The toll bridge on the outskirts of the town is the location where George thinks about committing suicide but is saved by guardian angel Clarence Odbody. When the two are in the water (after George jumps in to "save" Clarence) and the toll man shines his torch-light into the water, many of the houses on Bridge Street above the riverbank can be seen.

On the other side of the canal is a toll-house where George and Clarence go to get dry. In one shot of the toll-house there are many lit-up houses over the hills in the countryside, showing that the little town of Bedford Falls does actually spread out quite a bit.

=== Railway station ===
The Bedford Falls railway station is the main form of transport to get in and out of the town. The location was used only once in the film when Harry (Todd Karns) comes back from university with his wife Ruth Dakin (Virginia Patton) as George and Uncle Billy were waiting there. While waiting there George says to Uncle Billy that a train whistle is one of the three most exciting sounds in the world, along with anchor chains and plane motors.

=== Bailey Park and Potter's Field ===
Bailey Park and Potter's Field are two different housing developments. Potter's Field is owned by Henry F. Potter and through his bank, while Bailey Park is owned by residents who have received mortgages through the Bailey Brothers Building and Loan. Bailey Park was built just south of Mount Bedford and north of the town. Potter's Field is a play on the term potter's field, which refers for a place for the burial of unknown or indigent people.

Most people who live in the Potter homes are very poor and cannot afford to live anywhere else. Even this slum housing is not truly affordable, as Potter's organization charges very high rents for their properties, while skimping on amenities. This had provided the impetus for the Building and Loan to open their own Bailey Park development, which featured higher-quality homes at more affordable prices, and chance for people of modest means to build equity in them. Many residents, including the Martini family (William Edmunds and Argentina Brunetti) are able to move out of Potter's Field to Bailey Park with the help of the Building and Loan.

== 320 Sycamore ==
320 Sycamore
- Former names: Old Granville House; The Waldorf Hotel

General information
- Type: House
- Architectural style: Victorian
- Location: Sycamore Avenue, Bedford Falls

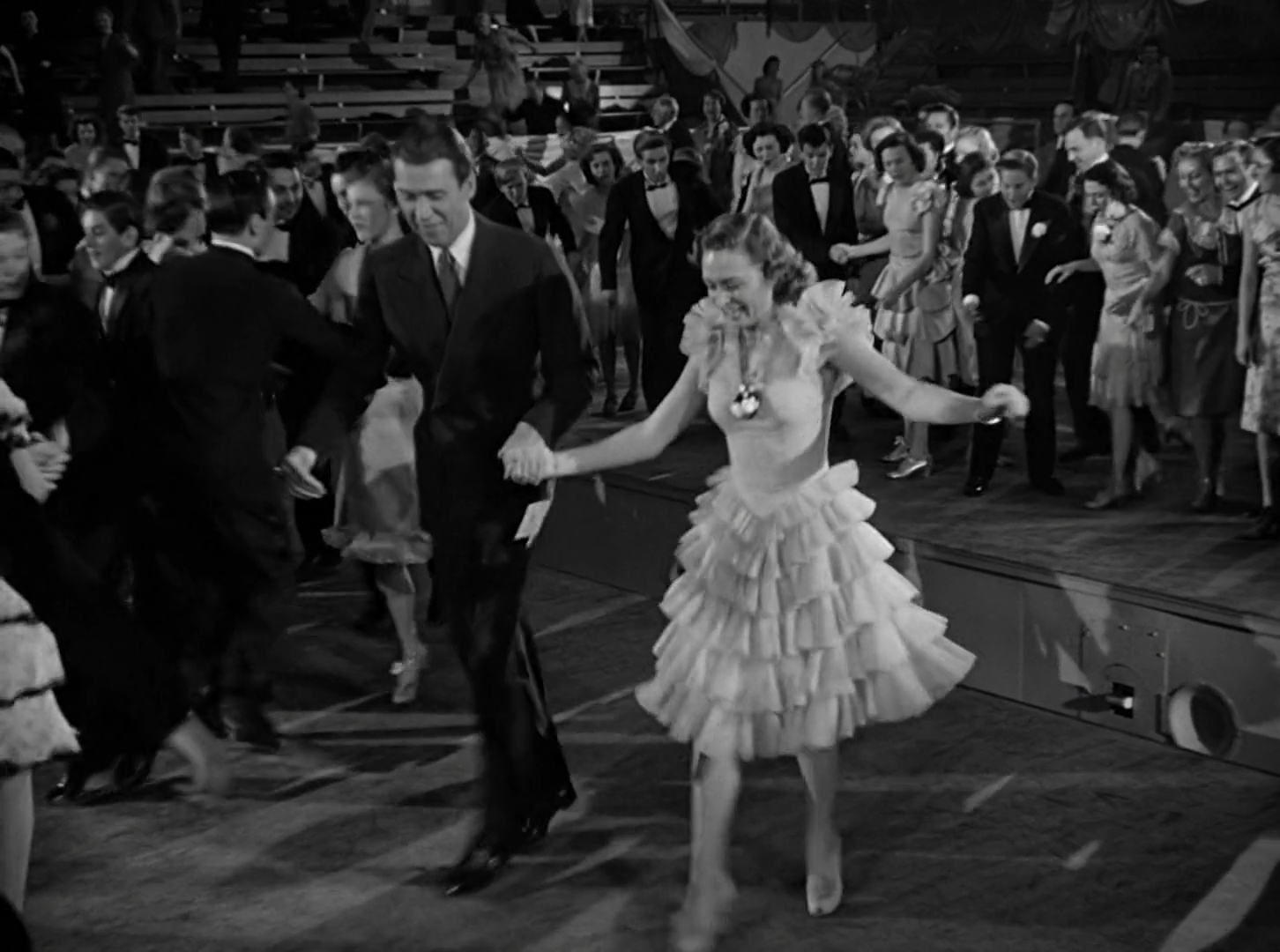
Stewart and Reed, as George Bailey and Mary Hatch, danced near the opening in the floor in the Beverly Hills High School gym

320 Sycamore is the fictional street address in Bedford Falls of the Bailey family. It is situated on Sycamore Street in the southeast of the town.

Before the Baileys bought the house, it was owned by a family named Granville, who left the derelict house vacant and it became perceived as a ghost house. The local teenagers made a game of throwing rocks at the Old Granville House, and if they broke a window they could make a wish. Mary bought the house in October 1932, on the day she and George were married. Over the years the young couple restored the house, improving it with such things as new ceilings and floors, and raised their four children in it.

== Filming location ==
The film was shot at RKO Radio Pictures Studio in Culver City, California, and the 89 acre RKO movie ranch in Encino, where "Bedford Falls" consisted of Art Director Max Ree's Oscar-winning sets originally designed for the 1931 epic film Cimarron that covered four acres (1.6 ha), assembled from three separate parts, with a main street stretching 300 yards (three city blocks), with 75 stores and buildings, and a residential neighborhood. Capra built a working bank set, added a tree-lined center parkway, and planted 20 full grown oak trees to existing sets for It's a Wonderful Life.

Pigeons, cats, and dogs were allowed to roam the mammoth set in order to give the "town" a lived-in feel. Due to the requirement to film in an "alternative universe" setting as well as during different seasons, the set was extremely adaptable. RKO created "chemical snow" for the film in order to avoid the need for dubbed dialogue when actors walked across the earlier type of movie snow, made up of crushed cornflakes. Filming started on April 15, 1946, and ended on July 27, 1946, exactly on deadline for the 90-day principal photography schedule.

RKO's movie ranch in Encino, a filming location of "Bedford Falls", was razed in 1954. (Note: Photographs of parts of the RKO set can be seen on retroweb.com. "Modern Streets."retroweb.com. Retrieved: December 29. 2011.) There are only two surviving locations from the film. The first is the swimming pool that was unveiled during the famous dance scene where George courts Mary. It is located in the gymnasium at Beverly Hills High School and is still in operation as of 2023. The second is the Martini home, at 4587 Viro Road in La Cañada Flintridge, California.

== Other connections ==
Since mid-December 2015 the small Scottish village of Birgham has been unofficially twinned with Bedford Falls, even having their road signs amended to include the reference.

In popular music, the fictional setting also served as the namesake for the Georgian indie rock band Bedford Falls.
