= Clarence (1990 film) =

1990 television film directed by Eric Till

- Genre: Comedy; Fantasy
- Based on: It's a Wonderful Life
- Screenplay by: Lorne Cameron
- Directed by: Eric Till
- Starring: Robert Carradine; Kate Trotter
- Music by: Louis Natale; Charles T. Cozens
- Countries of origin: United States; Canada; New Zealand
- Original language: English

Production
- Executive producers: Terry Botwick; Michael MacMillian; Harry Young
- Producer: Mary Kahn
- Production location: Toronto
- Cinematography: Glen MacPherson
- Editor: Bruce Lange
- Running time: 87 minutes
- Production companies: Atlantis Films; The Family Channel; NorthStar Entertainment Group; South Pacific Pictures; Television New Zealand

Original release
- Network: The Family Channel
- Release: November 24, 1990

Clarence is a 1990 made-for-television film directed by Eric Till. It is a spin-off of the 1946 film It's a Wonderful Life following the character of Clarence Odbody from that film. The film premiered on The Family Channel on November 24, 1990.

== Plot ==
Clarence Odbody has gotten younger since earning his wings after helping George Bailey back in 1946. He had an unspecified problem with his last assignment to help someone, and he would prefer to stay in heaven working on clocks. He only agrees to return to Earth because the widow of a new angel is considering suicide. The fellow angel (Richard Fitzpatrick) was a computer expert who died before he could perfect a voice-activated computer cartoon that is part of his educational computer games that teach kindness.

The new angel's widow, Rachel, (Kate Trotter) is raising two children, trying to improve her husband’s invention, and keep the family company solvent while dealing with a greedy man (Louis Del Grande) who wants to buy the company and use its technology to create violent children’s games. Clarence is constantly monitored by a recording angel and is forbidden to tell anyone he is an angel. If he does not succeed in helping Rachel, he will not be able to return to heaven.

== Cast ==
- Robert Carradine as Clarence Odbody
- Kate Trotter as Rachel Logan
- Louis Del Grande as Brimmer
- Richard Fitzpatrick as Jeremy
- Barbara Hamilton as Mrs. Duckworth
- Jamie Rainey as Casey
- Nicolas Van Burek as Brent
- Jason McSkimming as Joseph
- Larry Aubrey as Bert
- Rachel Blanchard as Jill

== Release ==
The film was made for TV and did not have a theatrical release. It was first broadcast on The Family Channel on November 24, 1990.

== See also ==
- List of Christmas films
- List of films about angels
