= Henry Travers =

British-American actor (1874–1965)

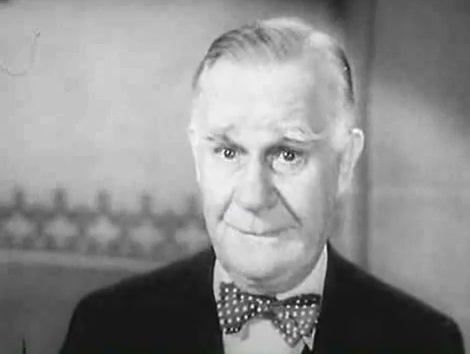
- Travers in The Bells of St. Mary's (1945)
- Born: Travers John Heagerty; 5 March 1874; Prudhoe, Northumberland, England
- Died: 18 October 1965 (aged 91); Hollywood, California, U.S.
- Resting place: Forest Lawn Memorial Park, Glendale, California
- Occupation: Actor
- Years active: 1894–1949
- Notable work: It's a Wonderful Life
- Spouses: Amy Forrest-Rhodes (m. 1931; died 1954) Anna (Ann) Glud Murphy (m. 1955)

Travers John Heagerty (5 March 1874 – 18 October 1965), known professionally as Henry Travers, was an English film and stage character actor who specialised in portraying slightly bumbling but amiable and likeable older men. His best known role to today's audiences was the guardian angel Clarence Odbody in the 1946 film It's a Wonderful Life. He also received an Academy Award nomination for his supporting role in Mrs. Miniver (1942). Other notable films include The Invisible Man (1933), Dark Victory (1939), High Sierra (1941), and The Bells of St. Mary's (1945).

== Early life ==
Travers John Heagerty was born on 5 March 1874 in Prudhoe, Northumberland, the son of Daniel Heagerty, a doctor originally from Ireland, and Ellen Gillman Hornibrook, also a native of Ireland (County Cork). She was previously married to William H. Belcher, a merchant seaman. He died in 1869. Travers had a half-brother, Samuel William Belcher, by his mother's previous marriage. He had a brother, Daniel George Belsaigne Heagerty, and a sister, Mary Sophia Maude Heagerty. Travers grew up in Berwick-upon-Tweed, and many biographies wrongly report him as being born there.

The Travers family lived in Prudhoe for a couple of years before moving from Woodburn, on the A68 road near Corsenside, Northumberland, in about 1866, to Tweedmouth, Berwick-upon-Tweed, in about 1876. Initially, he trained as an architect at Berwick, before taking to the stage under the name Henry Travers.

== Career ==
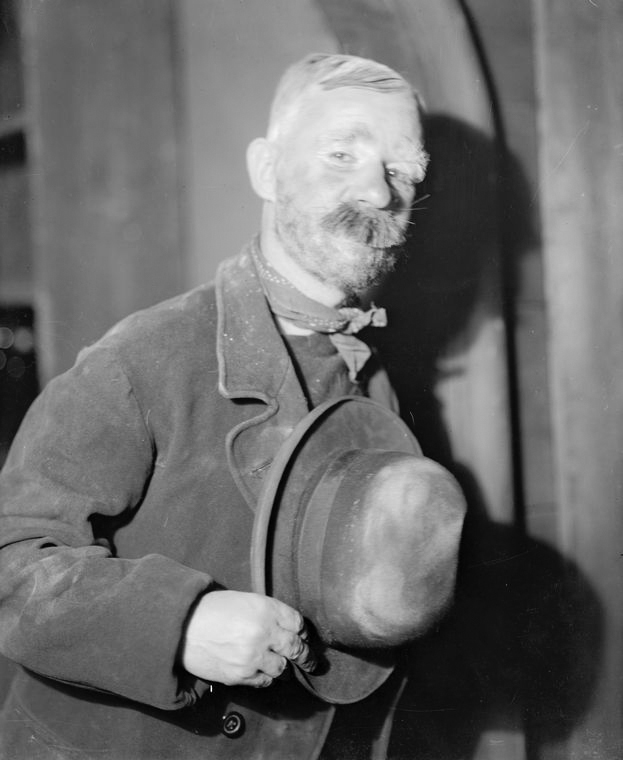
Henry Travers as the Burglar in the Theatre Guild's Broadway production of Heartbreak House (1920)

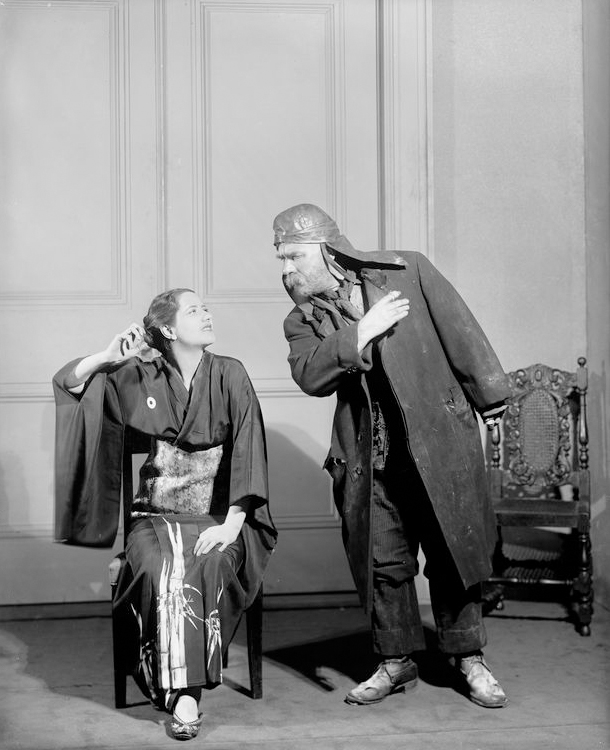
Lynn Fontanne (Eliza) and Henry Travers (Alfred Doolittle) in the Theatre Guild production of Pygmalion (1926)

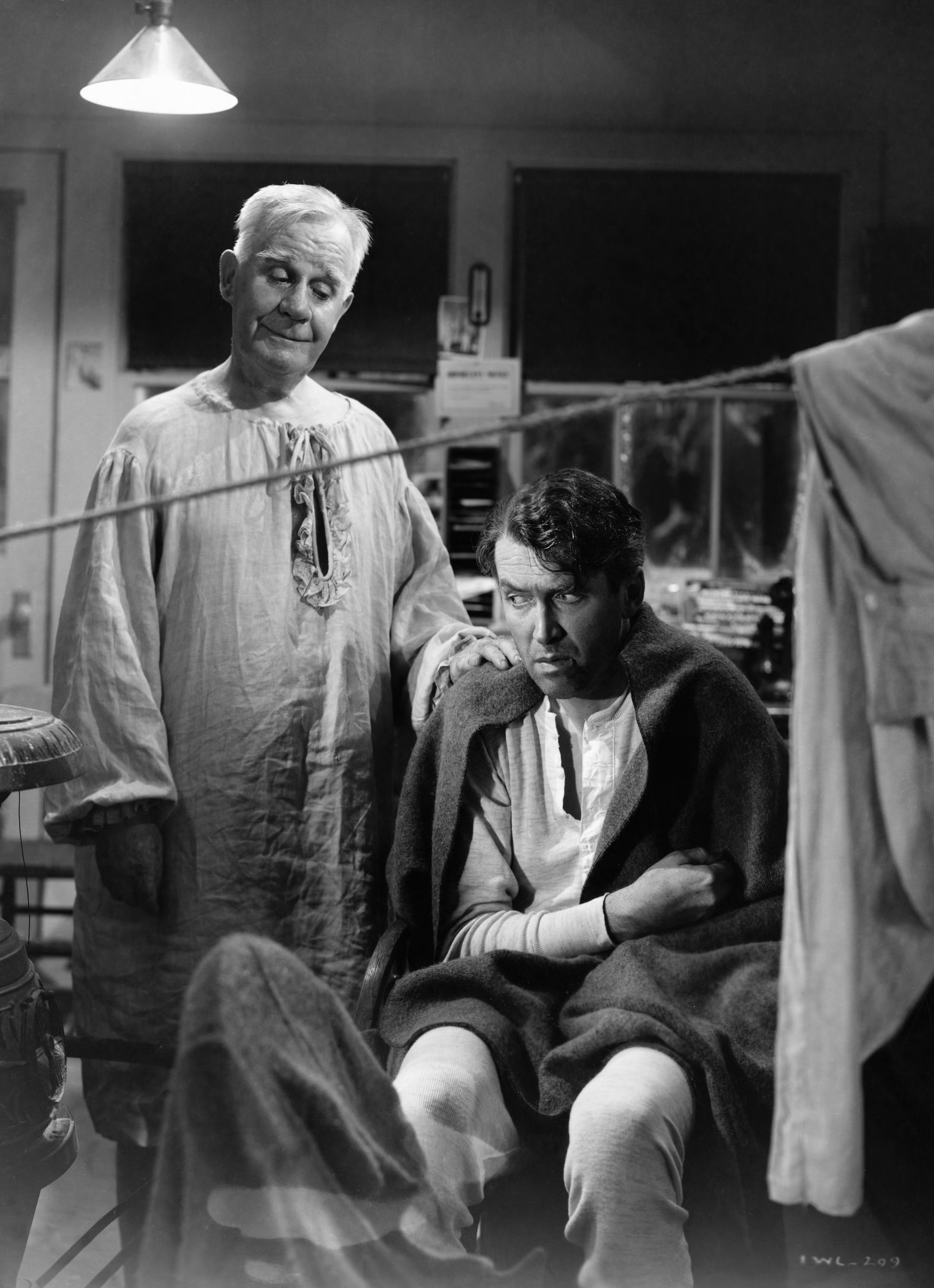
Travers in his most memorable role, as guardian angel Clarence Odbody opposite James Stewart in It's a Wonderful Life (1946)

Travers gained early experience acting in repertory theatre in England. He was billed as Travers Heagerty for a December 1895 production. He played character roles almost from the beginning of his acting career in 1894, often figures who were much older than himself. He made his Broadway debut in The Price of Peace (1901) but returned to England. Travers settled in the United States and played frequently from November 1917 until December 1938 on Broadway in over 30 plays, and was described in The New Yorker as 'one of the most consistent performers now in the American theatre, and at the same time one of its least appreciated'. His last play on Broadway You Can't Take It with You was his best known, where he acted in over 380 performances in two years. In the Oscar-winning movie You Can't Take It With You, Lionel Barrymore played the role which Travers had portrayed on Broadway.

His first film was Reunion in Vienna in 1933. In the same year, he played the father of Gloria Stuart in the horror film The Invisible Man. He often portrayed doctors, judges, and fathers of the main figures in supporting roles. Travers specialised on portraying slightly wry and bumbling but friendly and lovable older men. He appeared with Greer Garson and Ronald Colman in Random Harvest (1942) and with Bing Crosby and Ingrid Bergman in The Bells of St. Mary's (1945). Alfred Hitchcock employed Travers as a Comic relief in Shadow of a Doubt (1943), where he played a bank clerk with a passion for criminal magazines. The character actor also portrayed the railway station master Mr. Ballard with a love for roses who finally wins the annual flower show in his village shortly before dying in a WWII bombardment in Mrs. Miniver. He received an Academy Award-nomination as Best Supporting Actor for this appearance.

Travers's best remembered role was as James Stewart's somewhat befuddled but kind-hearted guardian angel Clarence Odbody in Frank Capra's 1946 film It's a Wonderful Life. Travers plays the guardian angel who saves Stewart from committing suicide, and then shows him how wonderful his life really is. Though the film was a financial flop, it later became a Christmas perennial.

Travers retired in 1949 after his supporting role in The Girl from Jones Beach. Overall, he acted in 52 films.

== Personal life ==
Travers' first wife was actress Amy Forrest-Rhodes. They were married from 1931 until her death in 1954. In 1955, he married Ann G. Murphy, who survived him.

== Death ==
After several years in retirement, Travers died as a result of arteriosclerosis in 1965, at the age of 91. He is interred with his second wife in Forest Lawn Memorial Park in Glendale, California.

The Maltings Theatre in Berwick-upon-Tweed has a performance space, The Henry Travers Studio, named after him.

== Filmography ==
- Reunion in Vienna (1933) as Father Krug
- Another Language (1933) as Pop Hallan
- My Weakness (1933) as Ellery Gregory
- The Invisible Man (1933) as Dr. Cranley
- Death Takes a Holiday (1934) as Baron Cesarea
- Born to Be Bad (1934) as Fuzzy
- The Party's Over (1934) as Theodore
- Ready for Love (1934) as Judge Pickett
- Maybe It's Love (1935) as Mr. Halevy
- After Office Hours (1935) as Cap
- Captain Hurricane (1935) as Capt. Ben
- Four Hours to Kill! (1935) as Mac Mason
- Escapade (1935) as Concierge
- Pursuit (1935) as Thomas 'Tom' Reynolds
- Seven Keys to Baldpate (1935) as Adalbert 'Lem' Peters / The Hermit
- Too Many Parents (1936) as Wilkins
- The Sisters (1938) as Ned Elliott
- You Can't Get Away with Murder (1939) as Pop
- Dodge City (1939) as Dr. Irving
- Dark Victory (1939) as Dr. Parsons
- On Borrowed Time (1939) as Dr. Evans
- Stanley and Livingstone (1939) as John Kingsley
- The Rains Came (1939) as Rev. Homer Smiley
- Remember? (1939) as Judge Milliken
- Primrose Path (1940) as Gramp
- Edison, the Man (1940) as Ben Els
- Anne of Windy Poplars (1940) as Matey
- Wyoming (1940) as Sheriff
- High Sierra (1941) as Pa
- A Girl, a Guy and a Gob (1941) as Abel Martin
- The Bad Man (1941) as Mr. Hardy
- I'll Wait for You (1941) as Mr. Miller
- Ball of Fire (1941) as Prof. Jerome
- Mrs. Miniver (1942) as Mr. Ballard
- Pierre of the Plains (1942) as Percival Wellsby
- Random Harvest (1942) as Dr. Sims
- Shadow of a Doubt (1943) as Joseph Newton
- The Moon Is Down (1943) as Mayor Orden
- Madame Curie (1943) as Eugene Curie
- None Shall Escape (1944) as Father Warecki
- Dragon Seed (1944) as Third Cousin
- The Very Thought of You (1944) as Pop Wheeler
- Thrill of a Romance (1945) as Hobart Glenn
- The Naughty Nineties (1945) as Capt. Sam Jackson
- The Bells of St. Mary's (1945) as Horace P. Bogardus
- Gallant Journey (1946) as Thomas Logan
- The Yearling (1946) as Mr. Boyles
- It's a Wonderful Life (1946) as guardian angel Clarence Odbody
- The Flame (1947) as Dr. Mitchell
- Beyond Glory (1948) as Pop Dewing
- The Accused (1949) as Blakely, Romley's Assistant (uncredited)
- The Girl From Jones Beach (1949) as Judge Bullfinch (final film role)
