= Bobby Anderson (actor) =

American actor (1933–2008)

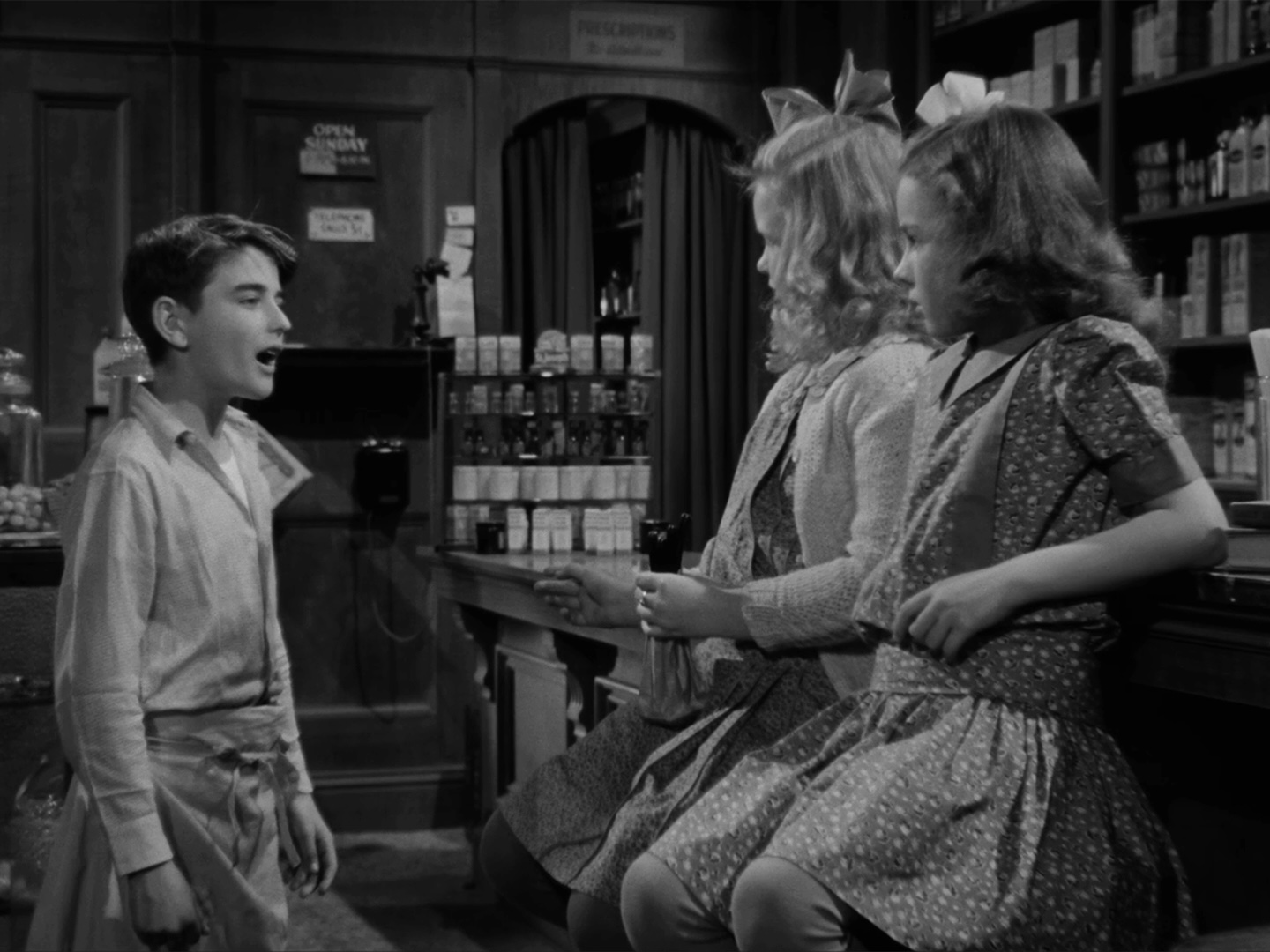
- Bobby Anderson (left) with young Mary and Violet in It's a Wonderful Life (1946)
- Born: Robert James Anderson; March 6, 1933; Hollywood, California, U.S.
- Died: June 6, 2008 (aged 75); Palm Springs, California, U.S.
- Occupation: Child Actor/Television producer
- Years active: 1940–1996
- Spouse: Victoria Anderson
- Children: 6

Robert James Anderson (March 6, 1933 – June 6, 2008) was an American child actor and television producer, whose roles included young George Bailey in It's a Wonderful Life.

== Early life ==
Robert James Anderson was born on March 6, 1933, in Hollywood, California, to a show business family. He was the son of Eugene Randolph Anderson, an assistant director and production manager, and Marie Augusta Fleischer, and his brothers and cousins were editors and production managers in their own right. He was also the nephew, by marriage, of directors William Beaudine and James Flood, both of whom were married to Anderson's mother's sisters.

== Career ==
Anderson's film career as an actor was brief. One of his earliest roles was in The Grapes of Wrath (1940) as a hungry boy. Anderson is perhaps best-known for his featured role as young George Bailey in the early scenes of the film classic It's a Wonderful Life (1946). He also had a credited role in another holiday movie, The Bishop's Wife (1947), starring Loretta Young, Cary Grant and David Niven. His film career slowed when he entered adulthood. He appeared in a number of TV shows including Spin and Marty and he made his last film in 1956.

Anderson enlisted in the Navy during the Korean War, serving as a photographer on aircraft carriers. After his time in the Navy, he went on to work behind the scenes in assistant directing, then later production with Disney, Warner Bros, Universal, HBO, United Artists, Columbia, and 20th Century Fox on such films and TV shows as The Apartment, Hawaii, The Heart Is a Lonely Hunter, Code Red, Police Story, and Ripley's Believe It or Not!.

He also worked as a line producer and production consultant for films such as Passenger 57, Demolition Man and Heat.

== Death ==
Anderson died of cancer on June 6, 2008, at age 75 at his home in Palm Springs, California.

== Partial filmography ==
Year	Title	Role	Notes
1940	The Grapes of Wrath	Hungry Boy	Film debut
1940	Maryland	Lee Danfield - Age 7	
1940	Young People	Jerry Dakin	
1940	Youth Will Be Served	Boy	Uncredited
1941	The Officer and the Lady	Jimmy	Uncredited
1943	Mystery of the 13th Guest	Harold as a Child	Uncredited
1943	Tender Comrade	Boy	Uncredited
1945	A Tree Grows in Brooklyn	Augie	Uncredited
1945	The Strange Affair of Uncle Harry	Child	Uncredited
1945	Colorado Pioneers	Parish Boy	Uncredited
1946	Gentleman Joe Palooka	Young Boy	Uncredited
1946	It's a Wonderful Life	Little George	
1947	The Fabulous Texan	Boy	Uncredited
1947	The Bishop's Wife	Defense Captain	
1948	Ruthless	Horace Vendig as Child	
1948	Silver River	Boy	Uncredited
1949	Kidnapped	Ransome - Cabin Boy	
1949	Samson and Delilah	Boy	Uncredited
1951	A Place in the Sun	Eagle Scout	Uncredited
1953	Born to the Saddle	Ricky Summers	
