= George Bailey (It's a Wonderful Life) =

Fictional character in It's a Wonderful Life

- It's a Wonderful Life character
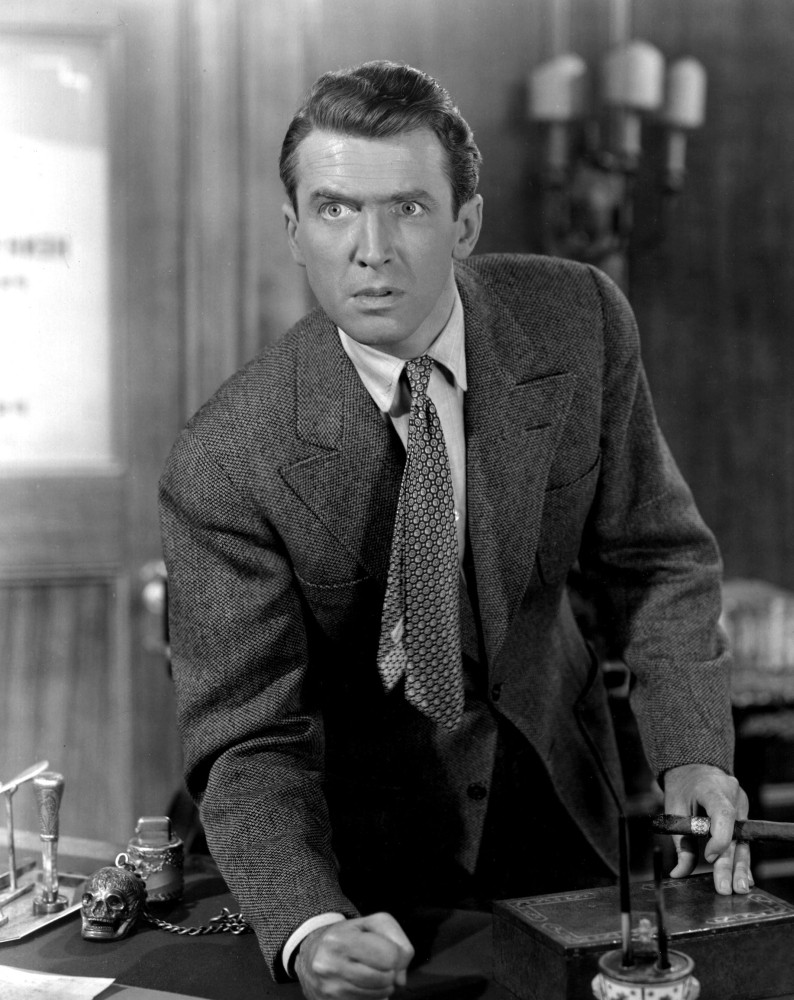
- James Stewart as George Bailey in It's a Wonderful Life

In-universe information
- Full name: George Bailey; Born 1907; Bedford Falls, New York, U.S.
- Occupation: Banker
- Family: Peter Bailey (father; deceased); Irene Bailey (mother); Harry Bailey (brother)
- Spouses: Mary Hatch (m. 1932–)
- Children: Pete (born 1934); Janie (born 1935); Zuzu (born 1940); Tommy (born 1941)
- Relatives: Billy Bailey (uncle); Laura Bailey (aunt; deceased); Eustace Bailey (cousin); Tilly Bailey (cousin); Ruth Bailey (sister-in-law); Marty Hatch (brother-in-law)

George Bailey is a fictional character and the protagonist in Frank Capra's 1946 film It's a Wonderful Life. The character is a building and loan banker who sacrifices his dreams to help his community of Bedford Falls to the point where he feels life has passed him by. Eventually, due to difficulties in keeping the building and loan solvent, Bailey falls into despair so deep that he contemplates suicide, until a guardian angel, Clarence Odbody, gives him a valuable perspective on the worth of his life. George finds through Odbody's angelic power and gift what the lives of his family and friends and the social structure of Bedford Falls would be like without him.

Bailey is played by James Stewart as an adult and Bobby Anderson as a child, and is loosely based on George Pratt, a character in Philip Van Doren Stern's 1943 booklet The Greatest Gift.

The character was portrayed by Pete Davidson in a 2020 television special.

== Fictional biography ==
=== Early life ===
In the winter of 1919, George (aged 12, played by Bobby Anderson) and his friends Bert, Ernie Bishop, Marty Hatch, Sam Wainwright, and his brother Harry are sledding on a frozen river. Harry breaks through the ice and George jumps into the freezing water to save him. In doing so, George became ill with an infection that waylaid him for some time and caused him to lose hearing in his left ear.

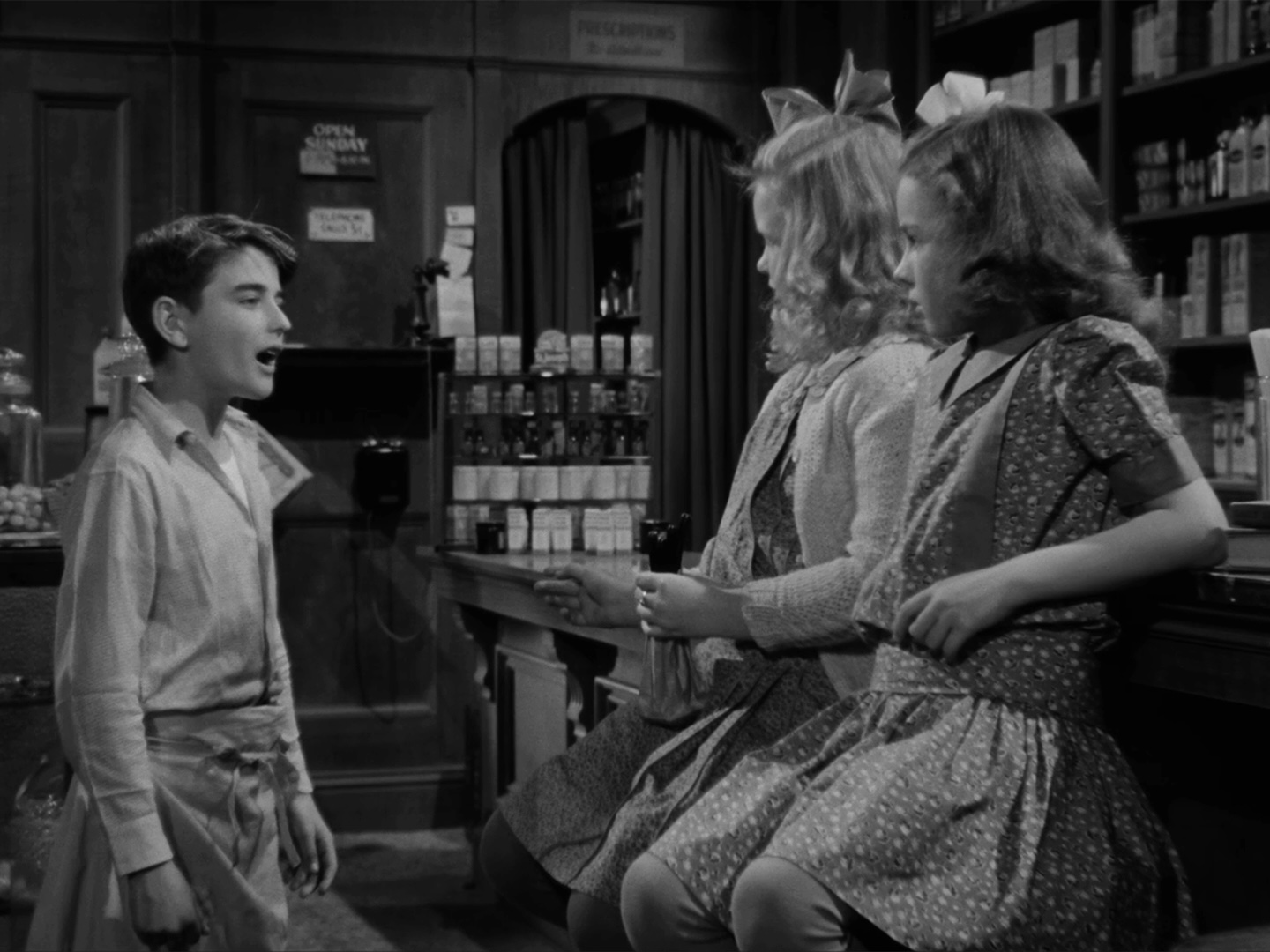
Young Mary and young Violet visit young George at Mr. Gower's drugstore

In May 1919, George returns to his after school job at Mr. Gower's drugstore, where he first attends to the soda fountain when two customers are Marty's sister Mary and her friend Violet Bick. George announces his plan to be an explorer and travel the world, citing National Geographic as an inspiration where Mary whispers her love for George in his deaf ear. George then finds a telegram informing Gower that his son has died in the Spanish flu pandemic. A visibly distraught Gower directs George to deliver medicine to a customer, but George realizes that, in his distress, he had inadvertently put poison into the capsules. He seeks advice from his father, who is president of the Bailey Brothers Building & Loan, but his father is meeting with Henry F. Potter, one of the shareholders. When he returns to the store, Gower angrily berates him for not delivering the capsules, until George blurts out Gower's mistake. Realizing this would have been fatal, Gower tearfully thanks George, who promises that he will never tell anyone what happened.

=== Young adult ===
In June 1928, George (played by James Stewart) is preparing for an overseas trip. He gets invited to Harry's graduation party. Before going George talks with his father about his plans for the future, in which architecture has replaced exploring, but he still desires to leave Bedford Falls and see the world. Peter Bailey explains that the work they have done in the building & loan is a way to make their mark on the world, but endorses George's decision to leave town "if he is unwilling to crawl to Potter". At the high school, he meets up with Marty, who reintroduces him to Mary, now a teenager. A rival suitor of Mary's attempts to embarrass George by tricking him and Mary into falling into a swimming pool situated beneath the dance floor, but George and Mary take it in stride and the partygoers consider it a splash. While walking Mary home they are interrupted by Uncle Billy, who comes by in a car and says that George is needed as his father has had a stroke.

Three months later in August, George is in a meeting with the board of directors of the Building & Loan to appoint a new successor to the late Peter Bailey. Potter argues that the Building & Loan should be dissolved, whereas George recommends his father be succeeded by his brother Billy. The directors tell George that the Building & Loan will only stay open if he agrees to remain and carry on his father's work. George foregoes a trip to Europe and his plans for college, giving the funds saved toward tuition to his younger brother under the condition that Harry take his place at the Building & Loan after graduation.

In 1932, George and Uncle Billy are waiting at the Bedford Falls railroad station for Harry to come home from college, when Harry arrives with his new wife, Ruth. Her father has offered Harry a job, which means he would not be taking George's place at the Building & Loan. Harry says that he will keep his promise to allow George his chance at the university. However, George cannot bear to allow his brother to throw away such an opportunity, so he remains in Bedford Falls. While the family is celebrating Harry's return, Ma Bailey mentions to George that Mary Hatch is also back from college and he should pay her a visit. He eventually goes to Mary's home to visit her, only to find that she is being courted by his friend, the now wealthy Sam Wainwright. However, George is encouraged to pursue Mary by Mrs. Bailey, who has concurred with Mrs. Hatch that while Sam would be a good provider, his constant absence would be problematic for Mary.

=== Pre-war ===
A few months later, George and Mary are married. Their plans for a honeymoon in New York City and Bermuda are interrupted by a run on the banks which also affects the Building & Loan. Potter's bank calls their loan, and panicked depositors want their money, threatening to take their business to the bank. As a stockholder, Potter threatens to shut the Building & Loan if they are forced to close early. Mary and George use the money saved for their honeymoon to keep the Building & Loan solvent.

In 1934, thanks to the Building & Loan, the Martini family move out of 'Potter's Field' to the new 'Bailey Park', (this home is the only original building from the movie that still exists) a residential development created by George that proves successful enough to seriously threaten Mr. Potter's rental interests. Potter offers George a job. Although this would bring a significant increase in social status and salary, as well as opportunities for travel, George declines. George returns home to learn that Mary is pregnant. Their first child is a son, whom they name Peter after George's late father. Their second child is a daughter, Janie.

=== The war years ===
1939–1945

During the war years, George and Mary have another two children, a daughter nicknamed "ZuZu" and a son, Thomas. George is classified 4-F (not eligible/unfit for military service) by the draft board due to his ear. Ernie becomes a paratrooper and parachutes into France on D-Day. Marty helps capture the Bridge at Remagen, Sam produces plastic hoods for planes, and Bert goes to Africa to fight, where he was wounded and eventually got the Purple Heart and Silver Star. While all of this is happening, George serves as an Air Raid Warden, remaining in Bedford Falls. Despite having to look after four children, Mary still has time to run the United Service Organizations in the town, and Mr. Potter becomes head of the draft board. Harry Bailey has the crowning achievement of Bedford Falls. Harry, who became a Navy pilot, engages in a risky interception of a kamikaze that was about to attack an Army transport, saving the lives of fifteen soldiers, to which he is awarded the Congressional Medal of Honor.

=== Post war ===
Christmas Eve 1945

On Christmas Eve morning, Uncle Billy is on his way to the bank to deposit $8,000 of the Building & Loan's cash funds (the equivalent of $140,219.11 in 2024). Holding a newspaper which has Harry on the front page, he greets Potter and taunts him about Harry's success in the war. Potter angrily snatches the paper, but Billy inattentively allows the money to be snatched with it. Potter notices the money and keeps it, knowing that misplacement of bank money would result in bankruptcy for the Building & Loan and criminal charges for George. When Billy discovers his error, he is confused and embarrassed, telling George that he has misplaced the money, and doesn't know where it is. George is extremely worried, especially as a bank examiner had arrived that day to do an audit. George and Billy go through the town taking every step Billy took in the morning and it goes to a dead end. When George goes home, Mary knows straight away something is wrong with him. To add to his anger, he finds out his youngest daughter Zuzu has come home with a cold, which George blames on her teacher. When the teacher calls, he berates her on the phone. His frustration culminates into smashing models of bridges and buildings he had made in his earlier years.

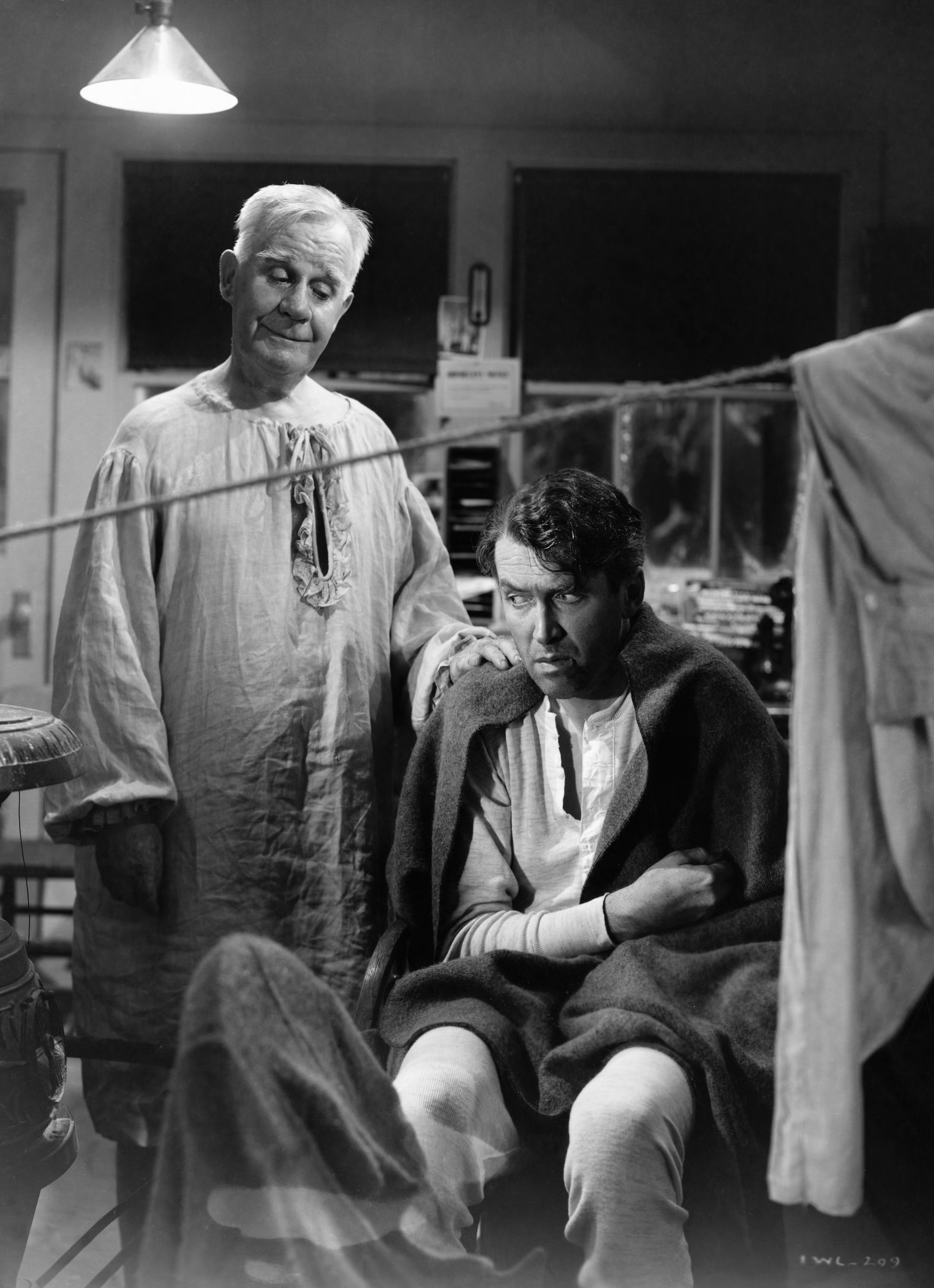
Henry Travers as guardian angel Clarence Odbody, after "rescuing" George

A desperate George appeals to Potter for a loan. Potter sarcastically turns George down, and then swears out a warrant for his arrest for bank fraud. George, now completely depressed, gets drunk at the bar owned by his friend, Martini, where he silently prays for help. He also gets a punch to the face from the husband of Zuzu's teacher, who is drinking there. The belligerent husband gets thrown out by Mr. Martini, the bar's owner and the patriarch of one of the families who moved into Bailey Park. Mr. Martini angrily says that any man who would raise his fists to George is never welcome here. George drunkenly drives his car into a tree and comes to a bridge intending to commit suicide, feeling he is "worth more dead than alive", echoing Potter's mocking of George's life insurance policy. Before he can leap, another man jumps in first and pretends to be drowning. After George rescues him, the man reveals himself to be George's guardian angel, Clarence Odbody. George does not believe him, and he bitterly wishes he had never been born. Inspired by this comment, Clarence shows George what the town would have been like without him.

Alternate Universe

In this alternative scenario, Bedford Falls is instead named Pottersville, and is home to sleazy nightclubs, pawn shops, and amoral people. The bar George frequented is now run by Nick, whom George knew as a bartender to Martini, but now has a gruff personality. Mr. Gower was sent to prison for poisoning the child and is despised and homeless. George's friend Violet Bick is a taxi-dancer who gets arrested. Bert is still a policeman, albeit with a darker personality and more brutal in his duties. Ernie still works as a taxi driver, but now desperately poor due to divorce and his family forsaking him. Uncle Billy has been in an insane asylum since he lost his brother and the family business. George's own mother, a woman defeated by the world, fails to recognize him. George then goes to Bailey Park, which is now a cemetery. Harry is dead as a result of George not being there to save him from drowning, resulting in the deaths of the servicemen not saved by Harry's heroism. (A deleted scene exists in which George learns why the bar is Nick's and not Martini's; George finds the graves of the Martini family near Harry's and realizes the family perished in a tenement blaze as George was unable to provide them affordable housing to move out of Potter's slums.) Mary is a shy spinster who works at the public library. When George desperately tries to convince her he is her husband, she considers it creepy and intimidating and yells for help. Her cries are answered by Bert, who thinks nothing of opening fire on George as he flees.

Return to Life

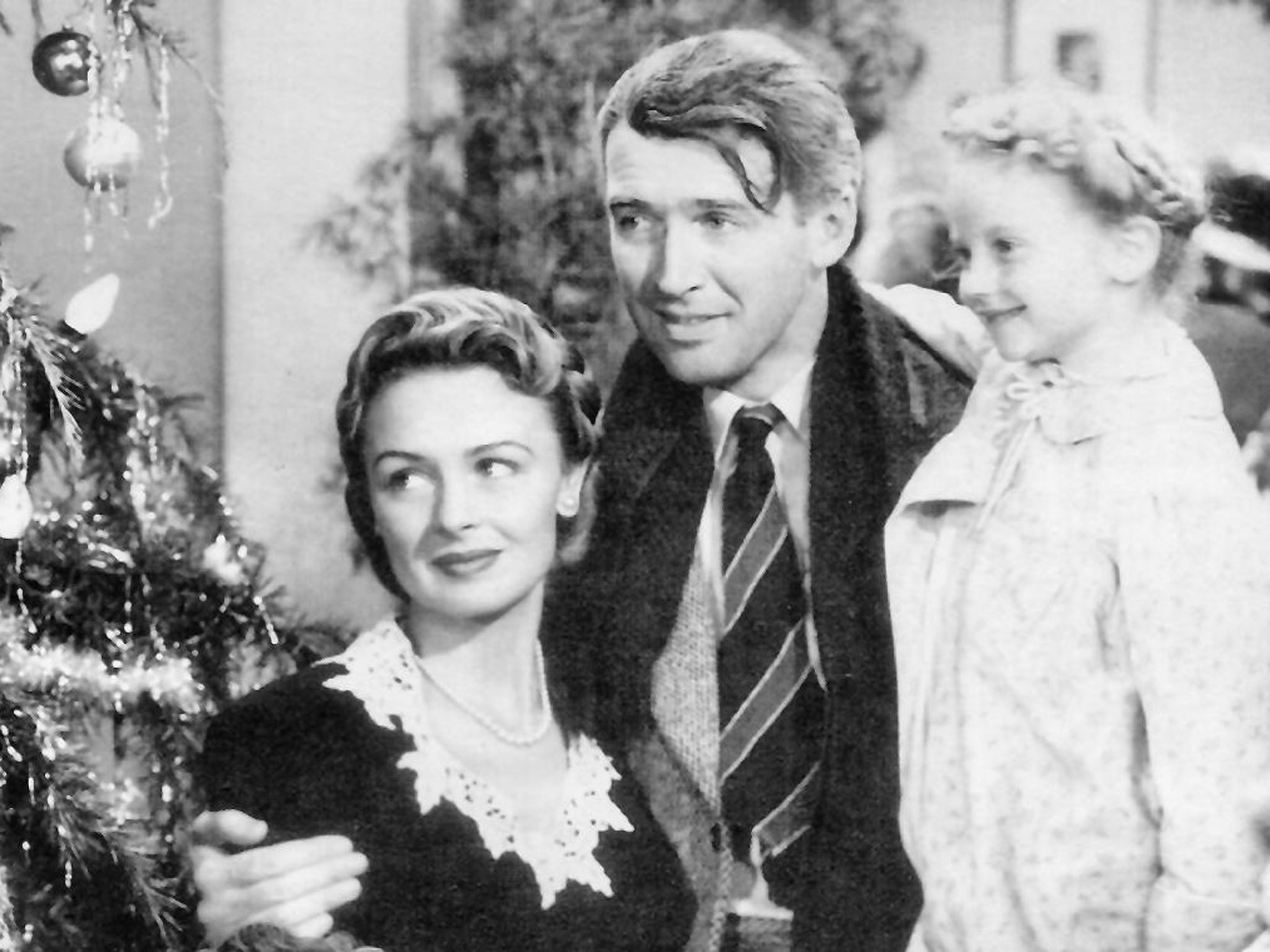
George, Mary and their youngest daughter Zuzu.

George runs back to the bridge and begs to be allowed to live again. Bert shows up at the bridge. When Bert is not there to arrest him but glad he has found him as everyone was worried to his whereabouts, George joyously hugs Bert then runs home. Running through town, George is overjoyed to see it is once again Bedford Falls and wishes everyone he passes a Merry Christmas, even Mr. Potter. At home, Mary, Uncle Billy, and a flood of townspeople arrive with more than enough donations to save George and the Building & Loan; Sam Wainwright extends a $25,000 line of credit by telegram (the equivalent of $438,184.72 in 2024). As they celebrate, the town's sheriff tears the warrant for his arrest and joins in the festivities. Harry also arrives to support his brother, and toasts George as "The richest man in town." In the pile of donated funds, George finds a copy of The Adventures of Tom Sawyer (from Clarence) inscribed, "Dear George: Remember, no man is a failure who has friends. P.S. Thanks for the wings!" A bell on the Christmas tree rings, and his daughter Zuzu says, "Teacher says every time a bell rings, an angel gets his wings!" George agrees and looks up to Heaven, realizing that he truly has a wonderful life.

== Contemporary reception ==
Bosley Crowther, reviewing for The New York Times, described Bailey as "a young fellow who wants to break away from his small-town life and responsibilities but is never able to do so because slowly they close in upon him". Crowther said Frank Capra's character as "a personable fellow who wants to travel and do big things but ultimately finds himself running a building-and-loan association in a one-horse town, married and locked in constant struggle with the greedy old banker of the town". Kate Cameron of New York Daily News described Bailey as a "guy who wished he had never been born, when the going gets too tough, and was permitted to see what his home town would have been like without him". Variety's Bert Briller wrote, "At 30 a small-town citizen feels he has reached the end of his rope, mentally, morally, financially." Briller said of the guardian angel showing him the impact of his life, "The recounting of this life is just about flawless in its tender and natural treatment."

Crowther commended James Stewart's performance as Bailey, "As the hero, Mr. Stewart does a warmly appealing job, indicating that he has grown in spiritual stature as well as in talent during the years he was in the war." Cameron said, "[Stewart] carries most of the burden of this long picture on his still slender shoulders and for the most part gives an endearing performance." The Hollywood Reporter's Jack D. Grant wrote, "James Stewart is distinctively Jimmy Stewart as George Bailey, his initial role in Hollywood after five years in the armed forces."

== Analysis ==
A large number of interpretations of It's a Wonderful Life have been advanced, and as George Bailey is the protagonist, many of those interpretations hinge on interpretations of his role in the film. Bailey is conventionally interpreted as the hero of the film, and he was listed ninth on the American Film Institute's 2003 list of the 50 greatest screen heroes. While the film shows some obvious instances of heroic behavior in Bailey's youth, such as saving his brother Harry from drowning and preventing Mr. Gower from poisoning a customer, doubts about the worth of Bailey's adulthood actions turn into the central question of his life. Bailey's deficiencies as a hero are highlighted by the facts that the film's climactic scene portrays Bailey as the person being rescued and that "Capra was forced to invoke a deus ex machina, a guardian angel, to convince Bailey of the worth of his life."

Citing generosity as Bailey's most admirable trait, Time magazine lists George Bailey among their top ten movie dads.

== See also ==
- 1946 in film
