= Mr. Potter =

Fictional character in It's a Wonderful Life

- It's a Wonderful Life character
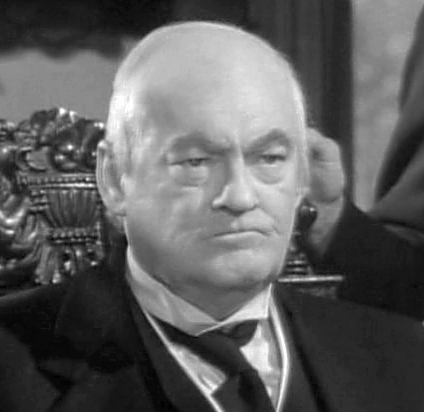
- Lionel Barrymore as Mr. Potter
- First appearance: It's a Wonderful Life
- Created by: Frank Capra
- Portrayed by: Lionel Barrymore

In-universe information
- Full name: Henry F. Potter
- Gender: Male
- Occupation: Banker
- Nationality: American

Henry F. Potter (commonly referred to as Mr. Potter or just Potter) is a fictional character in the 1946 Frank Capra film It's a Wonderful Life, portrayed by veteran actor Lionel Barrymore. Potter is a robber baron and the main antagonist of the film, stealing misplaced money from protagonist George Bailey, seeking to dissolve his building and loan association, and driving him to contemplate suicide.

== Casting ==
Lionel Barrymore was cast as Mr. Potter. Dan Duryea and Charles Bickford were also considered for the role. Although Barrymore won an Academy Award for Best Actor in A Free Soul in 1931, in the 1940s he was best known as the voice of Ebenezer Scrooge in the CBS radio dramatizations of A Christmas Carol. At the time of filming, Barrymore had become a wheelchair-user due to a hip injury and severe arthritis. Consequently, he played Potter as a wheelchair user due to polio; his wheelchair is pushed in all scenes by a wordless assistant played by Frank Hagney.

== Story line ==
Within the events of the film's storyline, Mr. Potter serves as the film's antagonist. Elderly, disabled, and miserly, Potter owns most of the businesses in the fictitious town of Bedford Falls, including the bank. One business that he does not completely own is the Bailey Brothers Building & Loan, though he holds a minority stake giving him a seat on the company's board of directors. The Building & Loan is a constant source of aggravation for him, not only because of its perpetual failure to earn a profit, but also because the Building & Loan causes him to lose renters for what George Bailey calls "slums", as the mortgages it provides enable the renters to buy their own homes, many of which are in a subdivision called "Bailey Park". Over the course of the film, Potter makes several failed attempts to have the Building & Loan shut down. These attempts comprise nearly all of Potter's scenes in the film.

- Potter's first appearance is in a flashback when Clarence Odbody is made to do research on George Bailey. He is taken to George's childhood where a horse-drawn carriage is seen. Clarence thinks such an expensive and ornate carriage must belong to a king, to which his superior Joseph answers "That is Henry Potter, the meanest and richest man in the town". Potter arrives at the Bailey Building & Loan, where he berates Peter Bailey for hesitating to evict people. A young George Bailey tells off Potter to his face.
- During a board meeting three months after Peter Bailey's death, Potter moves to dissolve the Building & Loan. Part of Potter's speech against the company is that George Bailey underwrote a $5,000 loan to Ernie Bishop, a struggling taxi driver, using their friendship as creditability. Potter says such loans will result in "a discontented, lazy rabble instead of a thrifty working class". Potter's motion is thwarted when George makes an impassioned speech about its necessity in giving residents an alternative to the bank, and calls Potter a "warped, frustrated old man". George's speech resonates with the board; they are willing to vote Potter down, but only if George becomes head of the company, to which George reluctantly agrees.
- Just as George and his new wife Mary are leaving town to start their honeymoon, George notices unusual activity at the Building & Loan. He discovers that Potter called in the bank's loan to the B&L, triggering a bank run, strategically timed to coincide with George's absence. Potter offers the shareholders fifty cents on the dollar for their shares in an attempt to become the company's majority shareholder. He is again foiled when George and Mary sacrifice their $2,000 honeymoon bankroll to keep the Building & Loan open and solvent while persuading depositors to take only what cash they need instead of demanding their entire deposit at once.
- Potter offers George a job working directly for him, at a salary several times what George presently earns, and with the possibility of travel outside Bedford Falls, which he knows George has always wished to do. But when George realizes that working for Potter would mean the end of the Building & Loan, he rejects the offer.
- On Christmas Eve 1945, George's Uncle Billy goes to the bank to make an $8,000 cash deposit (equivalent to $143,068 in 2025) and encounters Mr. Potter. Billy takes Potter's newspaper and opens it to the front page, gloating over the heroic war record of George's brother Harry, but then absent-mindedly puts his deposit in the folded newspaper before Potter snatches it back. Once in his office, Potter finds the money and realizes Uncle Billy's mistake, but decides to keep it, knowing that it will ruin the Baileys. George later visits Potter to ask for a loan to cover the lost funds. Potter duplicitously accuses George of using company money to gamble or patronize a mistress. When Potter asks George for collateral, all he has is a $500 equity in a life insurance policy with a face value of $15,000; Potter declares that George is worth more dead than alive, and then swears out warrants against him for criminal malfeasance and misappropriation of funds. Potter's final appearance in the film occurs later that evening. George, deliriously happy on his way home, shouts "Merry Christmas" to Potter through his office window. Potter responds, "Happy New Year to you – in jail!" Little does Potter know that George, on the verge of suicide and wishing he had never been born, had just been shown a vision by his guardian angel, Clarence Odbody, of what the town would have been like had George never existed. In this alternate reality, the Building & Loan has long since folded, and the town has become a sleazy, amoral place called Pottersville. As George reaches home he finds that Mary has asked neighbors and friends to scatter through town to raise what funds they can to help George. To top it all off, they receive a wire from George's wealthy friend, Sam Wainwright, who instructs his office to advance George up to $25,000, which more than covers the loss and yet again blocks Potter's attempt to close the Building & Loan.

== Reception ==
Richard Corliss of Time magazine described Barrymore's portrayal as, "... Scrooge, the Grinch and Simon Legree in one craggy, crabby package".

Mr. Potter ranks at #6 on the American Film Institute's list of the 50 Greatest Villains in American film history. Some commentators attempt to argue for Mr. Potter, promoting him as a symbol of entrepreneurial capitalism. In truth, at the time of the film's release the FBI made a file on the film that cited an unnamed expert in the film industry who thought the portrayal of Potter as a banker was unfair. The FBI placed the film on their list of suspected communist propaganda, keeping it there until 1956. The FBI's internal memo said that the film "represented a rather obvious attempt to discredit bankers by casting Lionel Barrymore as a 'scrooge-type' so that he would be the most hated man in the picture. This ... is a common trick used by communists."

== Influences ==
The Simpsons creator Matt Groening drew inspiration from Mr. Potter for the character Mr. Burns.

Barrymore's portrayal of Mr. Potter inspired Allen Swift's portrayal of mad scientist Simon Barsinister in the Underdog cartoon series.

In an interview with Michael Parkinson in 2002, Peter Kay stated that he named the Phoenix Nights character Brian Potter after Mr. Potter.
