= Philip Van Doren Stern =

American writer and historian (1900–1984)

- Born: September 10, 1900; Wyalusing, Pennsylvania, US
- Died: July 31, 1984 (aged 83); Sarasota, Florida, US
- Education: Rutgers University
- Occupations: Author; editor; Civil War historian
- Notable work: "The Greatest Gift"

Philip Van Doren Stern (September 10, 1900 – July 31, 1984) was an American writer, editor, and Civil War historian whose story "The Greatest Gift", published in 1943, inspired the classic Christmas film It's a Wonderful Life (1946).

== Early life ==
Philip Van Doren Stern was born in Wyalusing, Pennsylvania, into a family of humble means. His Pennsylvania-born father, Isadore Ullman, was a traveling merchant of Bavarian Jewish descent, who came to Wyalusing from West Virginia with his New Jersey-born wife, the former Anne Van Doren. Stern grew up in Jersey City, New Jersey, and attended Lincoln High School in Jersey City before graduating from Rutgers University–New Brunswick.

== Career ==
After graduating from Rutgers in 1924, Stern worked in advertising before switching to a career as a designer and editor in publishing.

He was a historian and author of some 40 works, and was best known for his books on the Civil War that a New York Times obituary called "authoritative" and "widely respected by scholars". As an editor, he worked at Pocket Books, Simon & Schuster, and Alfred A. Knopf. He compiled and annotated short story collections by and the writings and letters of Abraham Lincoln, Edgar Allan Poe, and Henry David Thoreau.

During World War II, he was a member of the planning board of the United States Office of War Information. He was the general manager of the Armed Services Editions, which resized popular books to fit in the pockets of military uniforms. He compiled and edited many collections and anthologies of short stories, pictorial books, annotations, and books on historical subjects.

Stern edited, compiled, and introduced The Viking Portable Poe in 1945, a compact collection of letters, short stories, poems, and essays by Edgar Allan Poe. Stern wrote the biographical introduction to the collection, selected the contents included, and wrote introductory essays on the varying genres. The collection became a standard single-volume anthology of Poe's works for almost fifty years.

Stern died on July 31, 1984, at the age of 83.

== "The Greatest Gift" ==
=== Short story ===
Stern is most remembered for a short story he wrote in 1943. In February 1938 Stern awoke with the story in mind. Inspired by a dream that was reminiscent of the 1843 Charles Dickens novella A Christmas Carol, Stern wrote a 4000-word short story called "The Greatest Gift". He began it in 1939 and finished it in 1943, but was unable to find a publisher for it. He sent 200 printed copies to friends as Christmas cards in December 1943. His daughter, Marguerite Stern Robinson, recalled, "I was in the third grade and remember delivering a few of these cards to my teachers and my friends ... My father, who was himself from a mixed religious background, explained to me that while this story takes place at Christmas time, and that we were sending it as a Christmas card to our friends, it is a universal story for all people in all times."

The story was published as a book in December 1944, with illustrations by Rafaello Busoni. Stern also sold it to Reader's Scope magazine, which published it in its December 1944 issue, and to the magazine Good Housekeeping, which published it under the title "The Man Who Was Never Born" in its January 1945 issue (published in December 1944). A small edition was produced in 1996 and yet another in 2011.

In a 1946 interview, Stern said that the story's setting of Bedford Falls had been modeled on Califon, New Jersey.

=== It's a Wonderful Life ===
One of those pamphlets came to the attention of RKO Pictures producer David Hempstead, who showed it to actor Cary Grant. Grant became interested in playing the lead role, and RKO purchased the motion picture rights for $10,000 in April 1944. After several screenwriters worked on adaptations, RKO sold the rights to the story in 1945 to Frank Capra's production company, Liberty Films, for the same $10,000. Capra adapted the story into It's a Wonderful Life in 1946.

In December 1946, James Stewart, who played George Bailey in the film, wrote to Van Doren Stern, calling the story "an inspiration to everyone concerned with the picture ... the fundamental story was so sound and right."

== Major works ==
- An End to Valor: The Last Days of the Civil War, 1958
- The Case of The Thing in the Brook, a mystery under the pseudonym Peter Storme, 1941
- Prehistoric Europe: From Stone Age Man to the Early Greeks
- A Pictorial History of the American Automobile, 1903–1953
- Edgar Allan Poe, Visitor from the Night of Time, 1973
- When the Guns Roared, 1965
- They Were There, 1959
- Soldier Life in the Union and Confederate Armies, 1961
- Henry David Thoreau: Writer and Rebel, 1972
- The Life and Writings of Abraham Lincoln
- Secret Missions of the Civil War
- The Man Who Killed Lincoln: The Story of John Wilkes Booth, 1939, dramatized and staged in New York in 1940
- The Annotated Walden: Walden; or, Life in the Woods by Henry David Thoreau
- The Annotated Uncle Tom's Cabin, 1964
- Robert E. Lee, The Man and the Soldier; A Pictorial Biography
- The Confederate Navy: A Pictorial History
- "The Greatest Gift", 1943
- Lola: A Love Story, 1949; historical novel based on the life of Lola Montez
- Tin Lizzie : The Story of the Fabulous Model T Ford
- The Portable Poe, 1945, edited, selected and with an introduction and notes by Stern
