= Ali Baba and the Forty Thieves (1944 film) =

1944 film by Arthur Lubin

- Theatrical release poster
- Directed by: Arthur Lubin
- Written by: Edmund Hartmann
- Produced by: Paul Malvern
- Starring: Maria Montez; Jon Hall; Turhan Bey; Andy Devine; Fortunio Bonanova; Frank Puglia; Ramsay Ames; Moroni Olsen; Kurt Katch
- Cinematography: W. Howard Greene; George Robinson
- Edited by: Russell F. Schoengarth
- Music by: Edward Ward
- Distributed by: Universal Pictures
- Release date: January 14, 1944 (US)
- Running time: 87 minutes
- Country: United States
- Language: English
- Box office: 3,634,679 admissions (France)

Ali Baba and the Forty Thieves is a 1944 American adventure film from Universal Pictures, directed by Arthur Lubin, and starring Maria Montez, Jon Hall, and Turhan Bey. The film is derived from The Book of One Thousand and One Nights, but its storyline departs greatly from the folk tale of the same name, wedding that story to an actual historic event. The film is one of series of "exotic" tales released by Universal during the Second World War; others include Cobra Woman, Arabian Nights, and White Savage.

== Plot ==
Baghdad, A.D. 1258. After Mongolian forces conquer Bagdad, the caliph Hassan escapes captivity, along with his young son Ali. While staying at the estate of Prince Cassim, Ali and Cassim's daughter Amara, fearing they will be separated, betroth themselves via a blood-bond. Later, Cassim betrays Hassan to the Mongols' leader, Hulagu Khan. Young Ali watches his father die, and vowing revenge, he escapes capture and makes for the desert. At one point, he spies a mountainside where a group of riders exits a hidden cave. Ali enters the cave and finds it filled with treasure. When the riders return, they find the boy asleep in their hideout. Upon learning he is the son of Hassan, and impressed by his courageous spirit, they allow him to stay. Their leader, Old Baba, adopts him as his son, dubbing him Ali Baba.

Ten years later, the band of 40 thieves have become Robin Hood-style resistance fighters, robbing the Mongols and giving to the poor and downtrodden. Their leader Ali Baba, now a grown man, plots the kidnapping of the Khan's bride-to-be, who turns out to be the grown-up Amara. The two childhood friends thus have a chance encounter at an oasis, but they don't recognize each other, and their reunion is cut short when Ali is ambushed and captured. He is taken to the Khan, who orders him pilloried in the public square. Before his ensuing execution, Cassim visits Ali to question him and recognizes him as the caliph's son, but keeps this knowledge from the Khan. Ali is rescued by Amara's servant Jamiel and his pack of thieves, who kidnap Amara before making a getaway to Mount Sesame. Old Baba, however, is mortally wounded and dies on the way back.

Later, Jamiel tracks the thieves to their hideout. After convincing Ali of his loyalty to the thieves' cause, Ali sends him to deliver a ransom demand to Hulagu Khan: Cassim for the return of his bride. As they wait at Cassim's estate for the exchange, Ali recognizes Amara as his lost childhood friend and commands her release. When Amara returns to Bagdad, her father confesses Ali Baba's true identity to her and the Khan. Amara declines to marry the Khan, but gives in after her father initiates a ruse of being allegedly tortured for her refusal.

Upon learning of Amara's decision, Ali decides to launch the final attack on the Mongols on the Khan's wedding day by planning to smuggle his band of thieves into the city inside forty jars of oil, meant as a wedding gift. One of Cassim's spies discovers the plan as she overhears Jamiel reporting to Amara, but the spy is found out herself, whereupon Ali implements a slight change. At the day of the wedding, the thieves sneak in with the crowd and infiltrate the palace. The jars turn out to be filled with sand, and the Khan kills Cassim for his failure. When Ali is arrested, the thieves attack the palace guards while Amara and Jamiel open the palace gates for the mob. Hulagu Khan is killed, and Jamiel hoists the Arabian flag atop the palace's highest tower.

== Cast ==
- Maria Montez as Amara
- Jon Hall as Ali Baba
- Turhan Bey as Jamiel
- Andy Devine as Abdullah
- Kurt Katch as Hulagu Khan
- Frank Puglia as Prince Cassim
- Fortunio Bonanova as Old Baba
- Moroni Olsen as Caliph Hassan
- Ramsay Ames as Nalu
- Chris-Pin Martin as Fat Thief
- Scotty Beckett as Ali Baba as a Child
- Yvette Duguay as Amara as a Girl
- Noel Cravat as Mongol Captain
- Jimmy Conlin as Little Thief
- Harry Cording as Mahmoud

== Production ==
The role of Jamiel was meant to be played by Sabu. However, when he went into the army, the role was taken by Turhan Bey.

Maria Montez admitted she only acted "three or four times" in the film.

== Reception ==
Diabolique magazine said the film "isn't as good as White Savage but is still bright fun" arguing that Bey's casting "throws the movie off. Sabu was a big kid but Bey is more mature, suave, grown up, with careful pro-noun-ci-ation. Sabu was never a sexual rival to Hall, but Bey he could be and Lubin gives all these close ups of him looking dreamy (the director and Lubin had clearly decided to build him into a star). It was clearly just the tonic for audiences after a hard day at the munitions factory. The public turned up in droves, and the film has never stopped playing on television."

== See also ==
- List of American films of 1944
- The Sword of Ali Baba, a 1965 remake of the film's plot
