= Tangier (1946 film) =

1946 film by George Waggner

- Original film poster
- Directed by: George Waggner
- Screenplay by: M. M. Musselman; Monty F. Collins
- Story by: Alice D. G. Miller
- Produced by: Paul Malvern
- Starring: Maria Montez; Robert Paige; Sabu; Preston Foster; Louise Allbritton; Kent Taylor; J. Edward Bromberg
- Cinematography: Woody Bredell; A.S.C.
- Edited by: Edward Curtiss
- Music by: Milton Rosen (music score and direction)
- Color process: Black and white
- Production companies: A George Waggner Production; A Universal Picture
- Distributed by: Universal Pictures Company, Inc.
- Release date: June 6, 1946
- Running time: 76 minutes
- Country: United States
- Language: English

Tangier is a 1946 American film noir mystery film directed by George Waggner and starring Maria Montez, Robert Paige and Sabu. It is set in the international city of Tangier, Morocco and was one of the last Universal Pictures films before the studio's reorganization as Universal-International in July 1946.

The film features a variety of well-known Universal players completing their contracts, such as Montez, Paige and Louise Allbritton.

The film was produced at the insistence of Montez, who had grown weary of her typecasting in Technicolor oriental adventures.

== Plot ==
In Tangier prior to the withdrawal of Spain, disgraced American war correspondent Paul Kenyon, café dancer Rita and local entrepreneur Pepe join forces to battle Adolpho Fernandez, a Nazi diamond smuggler.

== Cast ==
- Maria Montez as Rita
- Robert Paige as Paul Kenyon
- Sabu as Pepe
- Preston Foster as Col. Jose Artiego
- Louise Allbritton as Dolores
- Kent Taylor as Ramon
- J. Edward Bromberg as Alex Rocco
- Reginald Denny as Fernandez
- Charles Judels as Dmitri
- Erno Verebes as Capt. Cartiaz
- Billy Green as Mike
- Dorothy Lawrence as maid
- Francis McDonald as Sanchez
- George Lynn as lieutenant
- Joan Fulton as Rocco's Blonde
- Pat Alphin in minor role

== Production ==
=== Development ===
Maria Montez became famous in the 1940s appearing in a series of Universal Pictures films set in exotic locales and filmed in color alongside Jon Hall and Sabu, such as Arabian Nights, White Savage and Cobra Woman. In September 1943, Universal announced the upcoming Flame of Stamboul, from a script by Alice D. G. Miller, to star Montez, Hall and Turhan Bey (in a role intended for Sabu, who was serving with the military). Paul Malvern was to produce and the film was to be shot in color.

Miller's script was set in Turkey, which had been neutral for most of World War II. However, Universal was concerned about upsetting the Turkish government and filming was postponed.

In March 1945, the project was reactivated as Tangier, and Steve Fisher was hired to rewrite the script. The film was relocated to Tangier and the villains were changed to be agents from Franco's Spain. Later, the nationality of the villains was again changed to an unspecified location.

Montez had been in a dispute with Universal over her casting in romantic fantasy films. She said: "Sudan is making more money than any of the others and Universal thinks that on that account I should appear in more of these films. But I wanted to quit these films when they are at their peak, not on the downbeat. It isn't only that the pictures are all the same, but the stories are one just like the other." However, Montez also said: "Tangier is modern. I play a Spanish girl. I like that."

=== Filming ===
Filming began on September 24, 1945. As Bey and Hall were serving with the armed forces, their roles were played by Sabu and Robert Paige, respectively. It was Sabu's first film after his return from military duty.

Montez was pregnant during filming. Her daughter Maria Christina "Tina" Aumont was born February 14, 1946, one week before the film's February 21 copyright.

Choreography was led by Lester Horton.

=== Songs sung by Sabu ===
- She'll Be Comin' Round the Mountain

Traditional

- Love Me Tonight

Lyrics by George Waggner
Music by Gabriel Ruiz

- Polly Wolly Doodle

Traditional

== Reception ==
In a contemporary review for The New York Times, critic A. H. Weiler wrote: "Miss Montez' array of clothes is far more impressive than the picture's plot and the people involved in it. ... Preston Foster has been allotted the film's meatiest line. 'There seems to be an element of confusion here,' he says at one point, neatly explaining everything."

== See also ==
- List of American films of 1946
