= South Seas genre =

Literary and film genre

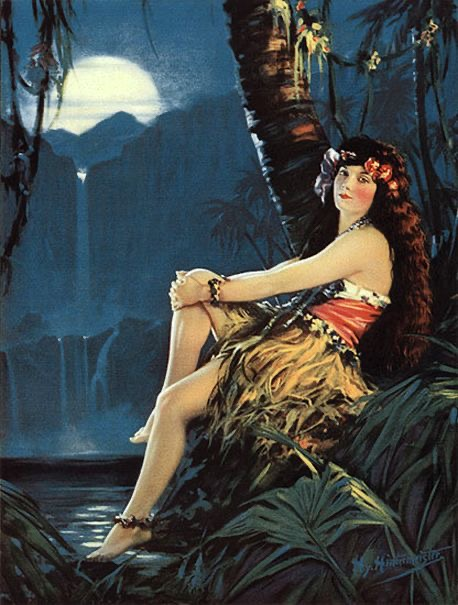
"South Sea Island idyll" by Henry Hintermeister based on Gilda Gray in Aloma of the South Seas in the 1920s

The South Seas genre is a genre spanning various expressive forms including literature, film, visual art, and entertainment that depicts the islands of the southern Pacific Ocean through an escapist narrative lens. Stories may sometimes take place in tropic settings like the Caribbean or Bermuda. Many Hollywood films were produced on studio backlots or on Santa Catalina Island. The first feature non-documentary film made on location was Lost and Found on a South Sea Island, shot in Tahiti.

The genre was known for its portrayal of tropical men as savages and cannibals, and women as shapely, innocent, exotic beauties. The genre was seen as financially lucrative by the movie studios in the 1940s, despite criticisms that the genre was unrealistic and not well-informed. Typical examples include 1941's South of Tahiti and White Savage (1943). Island themed films also served as a kind of travelogue for a middle class film going public that could not afford what was deemed the ultimate once in a lifetime romantic getaway. Those that could afford tropical island vacations had to endure a weeks long ocean liner journey. Later in the 20th century and with the advent of jet travel such lengthy treks to island paradises would be more feasible.

== Noted authors ==
- J. Allan Dunn: The Island of the Dead (1915), Beyond the Rim (1916), etc.
- Robert Dean Frisbie: The Book of Puka Puka (1929), etc.
- Jack London: Adventure (1911), South Sea Tales, etc.
- W. Somerset Maugham: The Moon and Sixpence (1919), "Rain," etc.
- Herman Melville: Typee (1846), Omoo (1847), etc.
- James A. Michener: Tales of the South Pacific (1947)
- Charles Nordhoff and James Norman Hall: Mutiny on the Bounty (1932)
- Frederick O'Brien: White Shadows in the South Seas (1919)
- Henry De Vere Stacpoole: The Blue Lagoon (1908)
- Robert Louis Stevenson: In the South Seas (1896)
- Charles Warren Stoddard: South-Sea Idyls (1873), Summer Cruising in the South Seas (1874), etc.

== Select films ==
South Sea stories in film and television
Year	Title	Filmmakers	Notes
1914	Hearts Adrift	Starring Mary Pickford, Harold Lockwood	Based on a story by Cyrus Townsend Brady
1914	McVeagh of the South Seas	Starring Harry Carey	Based on a story by Harry Carey, who also directed
1917	The Bottle Imp	Starring Sessue Hayakawa, George Kuwa	Based on the short story by The Bottle Imp by Robert Louis Stevenson
1919	The Isle of Conquest	Starring Norma Talmadge, Wyndham Standing	Based on By Right of Conquest by Arthur Hornblow, Jr.
1920	The Idol Dancer	Starring Clarine Seymour, Richard Barthelmess	Based on Blood of the Covenants by Gordon Ray Young
1920	The Love Flower	Starring Carol Dempster, Richard Barthelmess	Based on a story "Black Beach" by Ralph Stock
1920	Idols of Clay	Starring Mae Murray, David Powell	Based on a screen story by Ouida Bergère
1921	Passion Fruit	Starring Doraldina, Edward Earle, Stuart Holmes	Based on a screen story by Carey Wilson
1921	Tropical Love	Starring Ruth Clifford, Reginald Denny	Based on Peaks of Gold by Guy McConnell
1921	The Lotus Eater	Starring John Barrymore, Colleen Moore, Anna Q. Nilsson	Based on a novel by Albert Payson Terhune
1922	Lost and Found on a South Sea Island	Starring House Peters, Sr., Pauline Starke, Antonio Moreno	Based on a screen story by Carey Wilson
1922	South of Suva	Starring Mary Miles Minter, John Bowers, Walter Long	Based on a story by Ewart Adamson
1922	Ebb Tide	Starring Lila Lee, James Kirkwood and Raymond Hatton	Based on novel by Robert Louis Stevenson
1923	The Blue Lagoon	Starring Molly Adair, Arthur Pusey	Based on the novel by Henry De Vere Stacpoole
1923	The White Flower	Starring Betty Compson, Edmund Lowe	written and directed by Julia Crawford Ivers; ...filmed entirely on location in Hawaii
1923	Where the Pavement Ends	Starring Alice Terry, Ramon Novarro	Based on a screen story by John Russell
1923	The Ragged Edge	Starring Alfred Lunt, Mona Palma(as Mimi Palmeri), George MacQuarrie	Based on The Ragged Edge by Harold McGrath
1923	South Sea Love	Starring Shirley Mason, J. Frank Glendon, Francis McDonald	Based on With the Tide by Fanny Hatton
1924	Sinners in Heaven	Starring Richard Dix, Bebe Daniels	Based on a novel by Clive Arden
1925	Soul-Fire	Starring Richard Barthelmess, Bessie Love	Based on the Broadway play Great Music by Martin Brown
1925	Never the Twain Shall Meet	Starring Anita Stewart, Bert Lytell	Based on book by Peter B. Kyne
1926	Moana	documentist film with all Samoan cast	written, produced and directed by Robert J. Flaherty
1926	Aloma of the South Seas	Starring Gilda Gray, Warner Baxter, Percy Marmont and William Powell	Based on play by John B. Hymer and LeRoy Clemens
1926	The Savage	Starring Ben Lyon, May McAvoy	Based on a short story by Ernest Pascal
1926	Paradise	Starring Milton Sills, Betty Bronson and Noah Beery, Sr.	Based on 1925 novel by Cosmo Hamilton and John Russell
1927	Hula	Starring Clara Bow, Clive Brook	Based on a novel by Armine von Tempski...filmed in Hawaii
1928	Sadie Thompson	Starring Gloria Swanson, Lionel Barrymore and Blanche Friderici	Based on Rain
1928	White Shadows in the South Seas	Starring Monte Blue, Raquel Torres and Robert Anderson	Based on the novel of the same name by Frederick O'Brien...directed by W. S. Van Dyke
1929	Scarlet Seas	Starring Richard Barthelmess, Betty Compson	Based on a story by W. Scott Darling
1929	The Pagan	Starring Ramon Novarro, Dorothy Janis, Renee Adoree, Donald Crisp	Based on story by John Russell...directed by W. S. Van Dyke
1929	The Delightful Rogue	Starring Rod La Rocque, Rita La Roy	
1929	South Sea Rose	Starring Lenore Ulric, Charles Bickford and Kenneth MacKenna	
1930	Isle of Escape	Starring Monte Blue, Betty Compson, Myrna Loy	
1930	The Love Trader	Starring Leatrice Joy, Roland Drew, Barbara Bedford	
1931	Tabu: A Story of the South Seas	Starring Matahi, Anne Chevalier and Bill Bambridge	
1932	Bird of Paradise	Starring Dolores del Río and Joel McCrea	Based on a play by Richard Walton Tully
1932	Rain	Starring Joan Crawford, Walter Huston and William Gargan	Based on "Rain"
1932	Mr. Robinson Crusoe	Starring Douglas Fairbanks, William Farnum and Maria Alba	
1933	In the Wake of the Bounty	Directed by Charles Chauvel, starring Errol Flynn	Semi-documentary
1935	Mutiny on the Bounty (1935)	Starring Charles Laughton, Clark Gable and Franchot Tone	Based on the novel by Nordhoff and Hall
1935	Last of the Pagans	Starring Ray Mala, Lotus Long and Rudolph Anders	Based on Typee
1936	Isle of Fury	Starring Humphrey Bogart, Margaret Lindsay and Donald Woods	
1936	The Jungle Princess	Starring Dorothy Lamour and Ray Milland	
1937	Lovers and Luggers	Starring Lloyd Hughes, Shirley Ann Richards and Sidney Wheeler	Set on Thursday Island
1937	The Hurricane	Starring Dorothy Lamour, Jon Hall	
1937	Ebb Tide	Starring Oscar Homolka, Frances Farmer and Ray Milland	Based on novel by Stevenson
1938	Vessel of Wrath	Starring Charles Laughton, Elsa Lanchester and Robert Newton	Based on novel by Maugham
1938	Her Jungle Love	Starring Dorothy Lamour and Ray Milland	
1938	The Isle of Pingo Pongo		Cartoon
1938	Sinners in Paradise	Starring Madge Evans, John Boles, Bruce Cabot, Marion Martin and Gene Lockhart	
1940	Road to Singapore	Starring Dorothy Lamour, Bob Hope and Bing Crosby	
1940	Typhoon	Starring Dorothy Lamour, Robert Preston and Lynne Overman	
1940	Seven Sinners	Starring John Wayne	
1940	South of Pago Pago	Starring Jon Hall Frances Farmer	
1941	Aloma of the South Seas	Starring Jon Hall and Dorothy Lamour	
1941	Some More of Samoa	Starring The Three Stooges, Mary Ainslee and Dudley Dickerson	Short subject
1941	South of Tahiti	Starring Brian Donlevy, Broderick Crawford, Andy Devine and Maria Montez	
1942	Son of Fury: The Story of Benjamin Blake	Starring Tyrone Power and Gene Tierney	
1942	Reap the Wild Wind	Starring John Wayne, Paulette Goddard, Ray Milland	Based on Saturday Evening Post story by Thelma Strabel; directed by Cecil B. DeMille
1942	Pardon My Sarong	Starring Abbott and Costello, Virginia Bruce and Robert Paige	
1942	The Moon and Sixpence	Starring George Sanders, Herbert Marshall and Doris Dudley	Based on a novel by Maugham
1942	The Tuttles of Tahiti	Starring Jon Hall and Charles Laughton	Based on the novel by Nordhoff and Hall
1942	Beyond the Blue Horizon	Starring Dorothy Lamour	
1943	White Savage	Starring Jon Hall, Maria Montez	
1943	Isle of Forgotten Sins	Starring John Carradine, Gale Sondergaard and Sidney Toler	Rereleased as Monsoon
1943	Wings Over the Pacific	Starring Inez Cooper, Edward Norris and Montagu Love	
1943	Rhythm of the Islands	Starring Allan Jones, Jane Frazee and Andy Devine	
1943	Wackiki Wabbit	Starring Bugs Bunny, Jane Frazee and Andy Devine	Cartoon
1944	Bugs Bunny Nips the Nips	Starring Bugs Bunny	Cartoon
1944	Cobra Woman	Starring Maria Montez, Jon Hall	
1944	Rainbow Island	Starring Dorothy Lamour, Eddie Bracken and Gil Lamb	
1947	High Barbaree	Starring Van Johnson, June Allyson and Thomas Mitchell	Based on novel by Nordhoff and Hall
1947	Adventure Island	Starring Rory Calhoun, Rhonda Fleming and Paul Kelly	Based on Ebb Tide by Stevenson
1948	On an Island with You	Starring Esther Williams, Peter Lawford and Ricardo Montalbán	
1948	Wake of the Red Witch	Starring John Wayne, Gail Russell and Gig Young	
1948	Forbidden Women	Starring Mona Lisa, Fernando Poe, Berting Labra, Bimbo Danao	directed by Eduardo de Castro
1949	The Blue Lagoon	Starring Jean Simmons, Donald Houston, James Hayter	Based on the novel by Henry De Vere Stacpoole
1949	Omoo-Omoo, the Shark God	Starring Ron Randell, Devera Burton and Trevor Bardette	Loosely based on the Herman Melville novel Omoo
1950	Mutiny on the Bunny	Starring Bugs Bunny and Yosemite Sam	Cartoon
1950	Kon-Tiki		Documentary
1950	Pagan Love Song	Starring Esther Williams, Howard Keel and Minna Gombell	
1950	On the Isle of Samoa	Starring Jon Hall	
1950	South Sea Sinner	Starring Macdonald Carey, Shelley Winters and Luther Adler	Remake of Seven Sinners
1951	Bird of Paradise	Starring Louis Jourdan and Jeff Chandler	Based on a play by Richard Walton Tully
1951	China Corsair	Starring Jon Hall	
1951	Smuggler's Island	Starring Jeff Chandler, Evelyn Keyes and Philip Friend	
1951	Hula-La-La	Starring The Three Stooges, Jean Willes and Kenneth MacDonald	Short subject
1952	Saturday Island	Starring Linda Darnell, Tab Hunter, Donald Gray	Based on (from the novel "Saturday Island" by); Alternate title Island of Desire
1952	Caribbean Gold	Starring John Payne, Arlene Dahl, Cedric Hardwicke	Based on novel Carib Gold by Ellery Clark
1952	Road to Bali	Starring Dorothy Lamour, Bob Hope and Bing Crosby	Parody of the genre
1953	Miss Sadie Thompson (1953)	Starring Rita Hayworth, Aldo Ray and Charles Bronson	Based on "Rain"
1953	Botany Bay	Starring Alan Ladd, James Mason and Patricia Medina	Based on novel by Nordoff and Hall
1953	South Sea Woman	Starring Burt Lancaster and Virginia Mayo	
1953	The Girls of Pleasure Island	Starring Don Taylor, Leo Genn and Elsa Lanchester	
1953	Return to Paradise	Starring Gary Cooper, Barry Jones and Roberta Haynes	Based on a short story by James Michener
1953	All the Brothers Were Valiant	Starring Robert Taylor, Stewart Granger and Ann Blyth	
1954	His Majesty O'Keefe	Starring Burt Lancaster, Joan Rice and André Morell	
1954	Drums of Tahiti	Starring Dennis O'Keefe and Patricia Medina	
1954	Beachhead	Starring Tony Curtis, Frank Lovejoy and Mary Murphy	
1954	The Beachcomber	Starring Glynis Johns, Robert Newton and Donald Sinden	Based on novel by Maugham
1954	King of the Coral Sea	Starring Chips Rafferty, Charles Tingwell, Ilma Adey and Rod Taylor	Set on Thursday Island
1955	Pearl of the South Pacific	Starring Virginia Mayo, Dennis Morgan and David Farrar	
1956	The Revolt of Mamie Stover	Starring Jane Russell and Richard Egan	
1956	The Women of Pitcairn Island	Starring James Craig, Lynn Bari and John Smith	
1956	The Proud and Profane	Starring William Holden, Deborah Kerr and Thelma Ritter	
1957	Fire Down Below	Starring Rita Hayworth, Robert Mitchum and Jack Lemmon	Set in the Caribbean
1957	Hell Ship Mutiny	Starring Jon Hall, John Carradine and Peter Lorre	Television pilot
1957	The Admirable Crichton	Starring Kenneth More, Diane Cilento, Cecil Parker and Sally Ann Howes	Based on (Based on the Play by) J.M. Barrie; Alternate title; Paradise Lagoon
1957	Heaven Knows, Mr. Allison	Starring Robert Mitchum and Deborah Kerr	
1957	Naked Paradise	Starring Beverly Garland, Richard Denning and Dick Miller	Filmed on Kauai by Roger Corman back to back with She Gods of Shark Reef
1958	Lost Lagoon	Starring Jeffrey Lynn, Lelia Barry	
1958	Island Women	Starring Marie Windsor, Vince Edwards, Marilee Earle	
1958	She Gods of Shark Reef	Starring Bill Cord, Don Durant and Lisa Montell	Filmed on Kauai by Roger Corman back to back with Naked Paradise
1958	The Stowaway	Starring Martine Carol, Roger Livesey and Arletty	
1958	Twilight for the Gods	Starring Rock Hudson, Cyd Charisse and Arthur Kennedy	
1958	South Pacific	Starring Rossano Brazzi, Mitzi Gaynor and John Kerr	Based on the musical made from James A. Michener Tales of the South Pacific
1958	Enchanted Island	Starring Dana Andrews, Jane Powell and Don Dubbins	Based on Typee
1959	Forbidden Island	Starring Jon Hall, Nan Adams and John Farrow	
1959	The Restless and the Damned	Starring Edmond O'Brien, Richard Basehart and Andrea Parisy	
1961	The Devil at 4 O'Clock	Starring Spencer Tracy, Frank Sinatra and Kerwin Mathews	Based on novel by Max Catto
1961	Blue Hawaii	Starring Elvis Presley, Joan Blackman and Angela Lansbury	Based on novel by Max Catto
1959-62	Adventures in Paradise	Starring Gardner McKay	Television series
1959-63	Hawaiian Eye	Starring Anthony Eisley, Robert Conrad, Connie Stevens and Poncie Ponce	Television series
1962	Mutiny on the Bounty (1962)	Starring Marlon Brando, Trevor Howard and Richard Harris	Based on novel by Nordoff and Hall
1962	Tiara Tahiti	Starring James Mason, John Mills and Herbert Lom	
1962	No Man Is an Island	Starring Jeffrey Hunter, Marshall Thompson and Barbara Perez	
1963	Donovan's Reef	Starring John Wayne, Lee Marvin and Elizabeth Allen	
1964-67	Gilligan's Island	Starring Bob Denver, Alan Hale Jr., Jim Backus, Natalie Schafer, Tina Louise, Russell Johnson and Dawn Wells.	
1966	Hawaii	Starring Julie Andrews, Max von Sydow and Richard Harris	Based on novel by Michener
1966	Lt. Robin Crusoe, U.S.N.	Starring Dick Van Dyke, Nancy Kwan and Akim Tamiroff	
1970	The Hawaiians	Starring Charlton Heston, Tina Chen and Geraldine Chaplin	Based on novel by Michener
1979	The Hurricane	Starring Jason Robards, Mia Farrow and Max von Sydow	Based on the novel by Nordohff and Hall
1980	The Blue Lagoon	Starring Brooke Shields and Christopher Atkins	
1981	Who Finds a Friend Finds a Treasure	Starring Terence Hill, Bud Spencer and Sal Borgese:	
1982	Paradise	Starring Willie Aames and Phoebe Cates	
1983	Nate and Hayes	Starring Tommy Lee Jones, Michael O'Keefe, Max Phipps and Jenny Seagrove	Also released as Savage Islands. Story of Bully Hayes
1984	The Bounty	Starring Mel Gibson and Anthony Hopkins	
1990	Joe Versus the Volcano	Starring Tom Hanks, Meg Ryan and Lloyd Bridges	
1991	Return to the Blue Lagoon	Starring Milla Jovovich and Brian Krause	
1998	Six Days, Seven Nights	Starring Harrison Ford, Anne Heche and David Schwimmer	
1999	Molokai: The Story of Father Damien	Starring David Wenham, Kate Ceberano and Jan Decleir	
2001	South Pacific	Starring Glenn Close, Harry Connick Jr. and Rade Sherbedgia	Adaptation of musical
2002	Whale Rider	Starring Keisha Castle-Hughes, Rawiri Paratene	Based on the novel The Whale Rider by Witi Ihimaera; directed by Niki Caro
2003	Paradise Found	Starring Kiefer Sutherland, Nastassja Kinski and Alun Armstrong	Biopic of Paul Gauguin
2011	Rebellion	Starring Mathieu Kassovitz, Iabe Lapacas and Malik Zidi	
2012	The Legend	Starring Barry Primus, Thierry Helaine and Mi Kwan Lock	
2012	Blue Lagoon: The Awakening	Starring Indiana Evans, Brenton Thwaites and Denise Richards	Television film
2012	Kon-Tiki	Starring Pål Sverre Hagen, Anders Baasmo Christiansen and Tobias Santelmann	

== Bibliography ==
- Langman, Larry Return to Paradise: A Guide to South Sea Island Films Scarecrow Press, 1998
- Reyes. Luis I. Made in Paradise: Hollywood's Films of Hawaii and the South Seas Mutual Publishing Company October 1, 1995
- Dixon, Chris & Brawley, Sean Hollywood's South Seas and the Pacific War Searching for Dorothy Lamour Palgrave Macmillan; July 25, 2012
