= Jungle Hell =

1955 film written and directed by Norman A. Cerf

Jungle Hell a/k/a The Jungle Boy
- Directed by: Norman A. Cerf
- Screenplay by: Norman A. Cerf
- Based on: story by Norman A. Cerf
- Produced by: Norman A. Cerf
- Starring: Sabu
- Cinematography: Gilbert Warrenton
- Music by: Nicholas Carras
- Production companies: Taj Mahal Productions, Inc.
- Release date: 1955
- Running time: 85 minutes
- Country: United States
- Language: English

Jungle Hell is a 1955 American film written, produced and directed by Norman A. Cerf. The film was made from episode fragments of an unsold television pilot starring Sabu entitled Jungle Boy. Sabu fought against the low-budget film's release. Additional footage of a flying saucer was added to the film in the 1960s with narration.

== Pre-credits text ==
"With grateful acknowledgement to the Ministry of Information, Division of Films, of the government of India, and to His Highness the Maharajah of Mysore for their aid and co-operation in the production of this motion picture."

== Plot ==
Dr. Morrison has been sent into the jungles of India to investigate reports about a strange set of burning rocks, which have left many natives with radiation burns. With Jungle Boy (Sabu) as his assistant, Morrison gives the natives medical treatment, angering the local holy man (or "witch doctor"), who perceives Morrison as a threat to his power and influence over the natives. In the course of uncovering the mystery, the Doctor, Jungle Boy and other explorers encounter what appear to be flying saucers, the sources of the radiation.

== Cast ==
- Sabu as The Jungle Boy
- K. T. Stevens as Dr. Pamela Ames
- David Bruce as Dr. Paul Morrison
- George E. Stone as Mr. Trosk
- Naji as Shan-Kar
- Robert Cabal as Kumar
- Serena Sande as Shusheila
- Ted Stanhope as Dr. Angus Caldwell
- Jacqueline Lacey as Secretary
- Paul Dastagir as The Child

== Cast note ==
Paul Dastagir is the son of Sabu and Marilyn Cooper who met when she was cast in the 1949 Sabu film Song of India. "Dastagir" is a family name Sabu used when he served in the U.S. Army Air Force during World War II, but his son later gained notability as singer, songwriter, producer and guitarist using the name Paul Sabu.

== See also ==
- List of American films of 1955
