= Pirates of Monterey =

1947 film by Alfred L. Werker

- Directed by: Alfred L. Werker
- Written by: Sam Hellman; Margaret Buell Wilder
- Based on: story by Edward Lowe; Bradford Ropes
- Produced by: Paul Malvern
- Starring: Maria Montez; Rod Cameron; Gilbert Roland
- Cinematography: W. Howard Greene; Harry Hallenberger; Hal Mohr
- Edited by: Russell F. Schoengarth
- Music by: Milton Rosen
- Production company: Universal-International Pictures
- Distributed by: Universal-International Pictures
- Release date: December 1, 1947 (United States)
- Running time: 77 minutes
- Country: United States
- Language: English

Pirates of Monterey is a 1947 American Technicolor western adventure film directed by Alfred L. Werker and starring Maria Montez, Rod Cameron and Gilbert Roland. It was the last film Montez made for Universal Pictures.

== Plot ==
It is 1840 and California is ruled by the Mexican government. Kent is transporting rifles from Mexico City to California to be used by soldiers there. Wealthy aristocrat Marguerita Novarro and her maid are rescued by Phillip Kent when their carriage breaks loose.

The women hide and ride with Kent's caravan to Santa Barbara. Although she is wealthy and can pay, Kent says he will forego any remuneration from Marguerita in exchange for the first dance at a festival. As love blossoms, they continue north to Monterey with the caravan, where Kent is reunited with an old friend, Lt. Carlos Ortega, only to learn that Ortega is engaged to be married to Marguerita.

An attack by Royalists leaves Ortega seriously injured. Manuel De Roja is taken prisoner by Kent and turned over to one of Ortega's men, but the officer in charge turns out to be Manuel's own brother, Major De Roja.

Now in love, Marguerita and Kent try to leave Monterey together but are captured by De Roja's men. A jealous Ortega searches and is also taken captive, but after an escape, Kent kills De Roja in a battle with swords. Mexico's soldiers rout the royalists, and a grateful Ortega gives his blessings to Marguerita and Kent.

== Cast ==
- Maria Montez as Marguerita Novarro
- Rod Cameron as Phillip Kent
- Gilbert Roland as Major De Roja
- Gale Sondergaard as Senorita De Sola
- Philip Reed as Lt. Carlos Ortega
- Michael Raffetto as Sgt. Gomara

== Production ==
Rod Cameron had impressed Universal with his performance opposite Yvonne De Carlo in Salome, Where She Danced and the studio wanted to put him in a similar technicolor film with Maria Montez. This was meant to be Frontier Gal but Montez refused to make the movie and went on suspension. De Carlo acted opposite Cameron instead.

Eventually Montez agreed to make this movie with Cameron, which was announced in April 1946. Erle C. Kenton was originally meant to direct.

Mikhail Rasumny was borrowed from Paramount to appear in the film.

== Reception ==
The Chicago Tribune wrote that "With the exception of sprightly little Mikhail Rasumny, who contributes a bit of comedy occasionally, this film is dull business, peopled by elaborately costumed but expressionless characters."

The Los Angeles Times said the film "doesn't, by any stretch of the imagination, class as an "epic", but it is beautifully photographed in Technicolor and contains enough fightin', feudin', and fussin' to satisfy fans of shoot-'em-up cinema fare."

The New York Times claimed "the script for this rawhide romance was obviously ground out mechanically by an old typewriter on the Universal lot, set for 200 pages, while the writers played gin or slept. And the gent who is credited as director—Alfred Werker, who also has been around—plainly fulfilled his assignment in the same tired, mechanical way."

The Christian Science Monitor said "only the very young will be able to excite themselves about" the film.

Universal were reportedly so pleased with Philip Reed's performance they offered him a seven-year contract at one film a year.
