= Siren of Atlantis =

1949 film by Gregg G. Tallas

- Directed by: Arthur Ripley (uncredited); John Brahm (uncredited reshoots); Gregg G. Tallas (credited)
- Written by: Rowland Leigh; Robert Lax; Thomas Job
- Based on: novel Atlantida by Pierre Benoit
- Produced by: Seymour Nebenzal
- Starring: Maria Montez; Jean-Pierre Aumont; Dennis O'Keefe
- Cinematography: Karl Struss
- Edited by: Gregg G. Tallas
- Music by: Michel Michelet
- Production company: Atlantis Productions
- Distributed by: United Artists
- Release date: January 1949 (U.S.)
- Running time: 76 minutes
- Language: English
- Budget: $1,800,000 (est.)
- Box office: $335,000 (as at 1950)

Siren of Atlantis, also known as Atlantis the Lost Continent, is a 1949 American black-and-white fantasy-adventure film, distributed by United Artists, that stars Maria Montez and her husband Jean Pierre Aumont. It was the first feature she made after leaving Universal Pictures.

== Plot ==
André de Saint-Avit of the French Foreign Legion is discovered unconscious in the African desert. He claims he stumbled upon the lost kingdom of Atlantis, ruled by the beautiful Queen Antinea, who drove him to commit murder.

== Cast ==
- Maria Montez as Queen Antinea
- Jean Pierre Aumont as André de Saint-Avit
- Dennis O'Keefe as Jean Morhange
- Morris Carnovsky as Le Mesge
- Henry Daniell as Blades

== Production ==
=== Development ===
The film was based on the novel Atlantida by Pierre Benoit, which had been previously filmed in 1921 and 1932. The latter version had been directed by G.W. Pabst and produced by Seymour Nebenzal in Berlin with German and French dialogue.

In September 1946 it was announced Nebenzal bought the rights to film the novel and had signed Maria Montez to star. The film would be distributed through United Artists.

Jay Dratler was originally signed to write the screenplay. A number of other writers also worked on it, including an uncredited Douglas Sirk. Sirk says he was approached to direct the film by Rudi Joseph, who had been Pabst's assistant. Sirk turned it down claiming the Pabst version was a very good film that simply should have been re-released. He was also a worried producer:

Didn't have the money to do the necessary fantastic sets. You know, Atlantis depends on inspiring people's fantasies. The old Pabst picture had great sets, but you do need money to construct a hidden city and that kind of thing. It's no good trying to shoot this sort of film on a small budget, as Nebenzal wanted – and then he wanted me to use some of the long-shot material from the old Pabst and so on.

Sirk did agree to do some uncredited work on the screenplay with Rowland Leigh but said he was "fairly sure I didn't do any shooting" on the film.

It proved difficult to come up with a screenplay that satisfied the censors. In the novel, the queen had an insatiable appetite for male lovers and turns them into statues when she has finished with them. The Joseph Breen office wrote to Nebenzal complaining about the depiction of "hasheesh and illicit sex". As a result, adjustments to the screenplay were made.

Montez's husband Jean Pierre Aumont was borrowed from MGM to appear opposite his wife. Dennis O'Keefe was then signed to support them. Filming was to start in December 1946 but was postponed because Montez needed to have surgery and was also required to star in another film for Universal.

=== Shooting ===
The film started shooting on 17 February 1947 at a cost of $1.3 million under the direction of Arthur Ripley. Lionel Banks, who had worked on Lost Horizon, did the sets. It was filmed at Samuel Goldwyn Studios.

Aumont later wrote that "the decors were a fantastic mishmash, including naugahyde doors which seemed to have come right out of the office of the frenetic producer rather than the mysterious palace of Antinea." He also said the filmmakers made him wear three-inch heels so that he was taller than Dennis O'Keefe, who was two-inches taller than Aumont.

Montez said during filming that she hoped to give a good performance along with the "sex and stuff people expect of me... Not that I have anything against glamour. But I would like a role I could get my teeth into. After all, I have two years typing to overcome, of going from one to another until I was groggy. And it is the hardest thing to do that sort of vamp – like Theda Bara – and not be laughable."

Aumont recalls that dromedaries were imported from a neighboring zoo. Camels were needed, however, so a second hump was attached to each of them using rubber cement. A leopard, who acted in the film, was dosed with tranquilizers and sent to live with Aumont and Montez for a few days to become accustomed to them.

After filming wrapped, both Aumont and Montez signed three year contracts with the producer to make one film a year. "It is a picture of which I am very proud", said Montez. Aumont wrote that the film "for some mysterious reason, didn't fare too badly."

=== Reshoots ===
Test screenings in Las Vegas went poorly and the producer became convinced that audiences did not understand the Pierre Benoit story because it was "too philosophical". Douglas Sirk saw the film and thought that "for various reasons not to do with Ripley, but mainly with the cast, it did not come off." Sirk was asked to salvage the film "but I didn't want to have anything to do with it anymore."

Nebenzal managed to raise an estimated $250,000 for further reshoots done over two weeks in July, with John Brahm directing. Morris Carnovsky's role was reduced since he was not available and his character was replaced with a new one played by Henry Daniell. Maria Montez and Aumont returned and "violence and movement" was introduced, according to the producer. Neither Ripley nor Brahm were willing to take credit for the final version, so the editor Gregg G. Tallas, who put together the two versions, was credited as the film's director.

Choreography in the film was by Lester Horton.

== Reception ==
The film had trouble securing distribution in the US, requiring re-editing. However, it has now come to be appreciated as a camp classic.

It was also known simply as Atlantis.

=== Box office ===
The film performed poorly at the box office and was described as "a calamity from a financial standpoint." The producer later revealed at a trial (see below) that the film needed to gross $3.5 million to break even and as of 1950 had only grossed $335,000. It did perform respectably in France, however, with 2,188,732 paid admissions.

=== Critical reception ===
The Los Angeles Times said the film "does have its moments of action and violence but too much of it is given over to the philosophical introspection (or thinking aloud) of the characters."

== Lawsuit ==
In October 1948 Montez sued Nebenzal for $38,000. She claimed under her contract on 2 October 1946 she was to be paid $100,000, half during filming and the rest within nine months. Although the film finished 12 June 1947, Montez said she had only received $62,000. The matter went to trial in 1950 and Montez had to fly back to the US from Europe to give evidence. Judgement was returned in Montez's favor and it was ruled she was entitled to the whole amount.
