= Revenge of the Pirates =

1951 Italian film

- Directed by: Primo Zeglio
- Starring: Maria Montez; Jean-Pierre Aumont
- Cinematography: Gábor Pogány
- Edited by: Mario Serandrei
- Music by: Carlo Rustichelli
- Release date: 18 October 1951
- Country: Italy
- Language: Italian

Revenge of the Pirates (Italian: La vendetta del corsaro) is a 1951 Italian adventure film directed by Primo Zeglio. It was the last movie of Maria Montez.

It is also known as The Pirates Revenge and Duel Before the Mast.

== Plot ==
In 1675, Enrico di Roccabruna turns pirate to avenge his father's death.

== Cast ==
- Jean-Pierre Aumont as Enrico di Roccabruna
- Maria Montez as Consuelo
- Milly Vitale as Luana
- Roberto Risso as Miguel
- Paul Muller as Espinosa
- Franca Tamantini as Conchita
- Saro Urzì as Aguirre
- Mimì Aylmer as Isabella
- Mario Castellani as Armagnac
- Sidney Gordon as Van Hiess
- Enrico Glori as Governor
- Franca Marzi

== Production ==
The film was shot in Rome. Jean Pierre Aumont says he and Montez celebrated their eighth wedding anniversary during filming on 13 July 1951. She would be dead by September.
