= Jean-Pierre Aumont =

French actor and soldier (1911–2001)

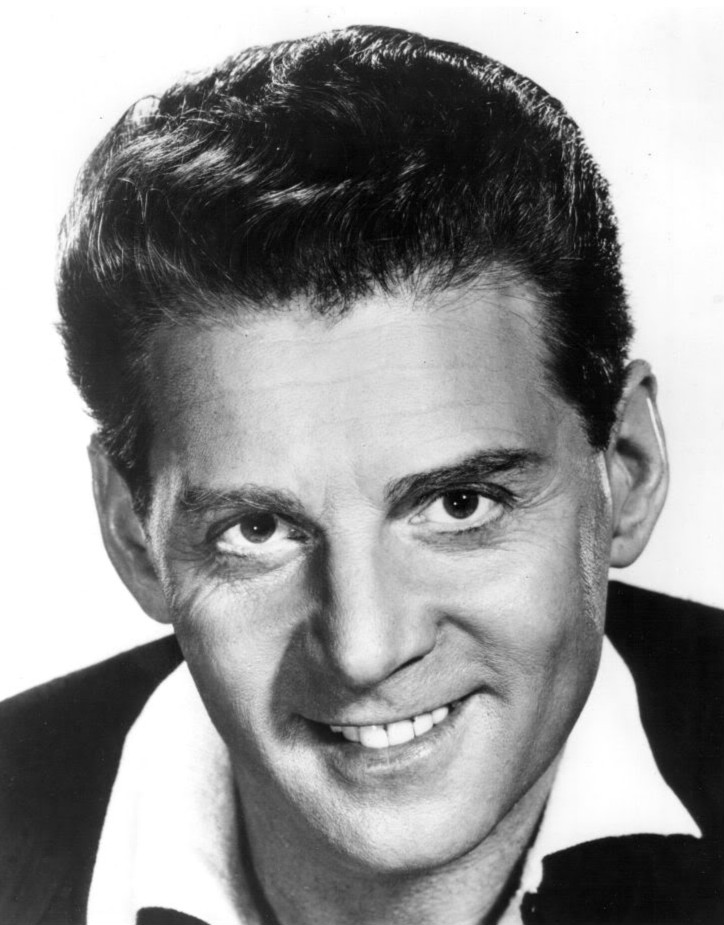
- Aumont in 1959
- Born: Jean-Pierre Philippe Salomons; 5 January 1911; Paris, France
- Died: 30 January 2001 (aged 90); Gassin, France
- Occupation: Actor
- Years active: 1931–1996
- Spouses: Blanche Montel (m. 1938; div. 1940) Maria Montez (m. 1943; died 1951) Marisa Pavan (m. 1956)
- Children: 3, including Tina Aumont
- Relatives: François Villiers (brother); Georges Berr (great-uncle)

Jean-Pierre Aumont (born Jean-Pierre Philippe Salomons; 5 January 1911 – 30 January 2001) was a French film and theatre actor. He was a matinée idol and a leading man during the 1930s, but his burgeoning career was interrupted by the Second World War. He served in the Free French Forces, and receiving both the Légion d'Honneur and the Croix de Guerre for his actions.

After the war, Aumont resumed his career, in Hollywood as well as his native France, typically playing suave romantic leads. In 1991, he received an Honorary César for his contributions to the French film industry.

== Early life ==
Aumont was born Jean-Pierre Philippe Salomons in Paris, the son of Suzanne (née Cahen; 1885–1940), an actress, and Alexandre Salomons, owner of La Maison du Blanc (a linen department store). His mother's uncle was well-known stage actor Georges Berr (died 1942). His father was from a Dutch-Jewish family; his mother's family were French Jews. Aumont's younger brother was the noted French film director François Villiers.

== Career ==
At age 16, Aumont began studying drama at the Paris Conservatory, where his mother also studied. His professional stage debut occurred at the age of 19. His film debut came one year later when Jean de la Lune (Jean of the Moon) was produced in 1931.

However, his most important, career-defining role came in 1934 when Jean Cocteau's play La Machine infernale (The Infernal Machine), was staged. While his film and stage career began rising quickly, World War II began. Aumont remained in France until 1942 when he realized that as a Jew he would have to flee the Nazis. He migrated from the unoccupied zone of Vichy France to New York City, then to Hollywood, California to pursue his film career.

He began working for MGM, but after finishing The Cross of Lorraine, he joined the Free French Forces. He was sent to North Africa, where he participated in Operation Torch in Tunisia. He then moved with the Allied armies through Italy and France. He was wounded twice. The first was on a mission with his brother; the second was more serious. Aumont's Jeep was blown up near a land-mined bridge. General Diego Brosset, commander of the 1st Free French Division, to whom Aumont was aide de camp, was killed. For his bravery during the fighting, Aumont received the Légion d'Honneur and the Croix de Guerre.

After the war, Aumont quickly resumed his movie career, starring with Ginger Rogers in Heartbeat (1946) and as the magician in Lili (1953) with Leslie Caron. He worked with a number of prominent theatre director and stars, including his (then) wife Maria Montez. In the mid-1950s, Aumont began working in television, appearing on several anthology programs, such as Robert Montgomery Presents and as a guest on the show What's My Line?. In the 1960s and 1970s, he appeared in various theater productions, including the musicals Tovarich with Vivien Leigh, Jacques Brel Is Alive and Well and Living in Paris, South Pacific, and Gigi.

One of his later performances was in A Tale of Two Cities (1989). Two years later, in 1991, aged 80, he received an honorary César Award as well as being decorated with the cross of Commandeur des Arts et des Lettres.

== Personal life ==
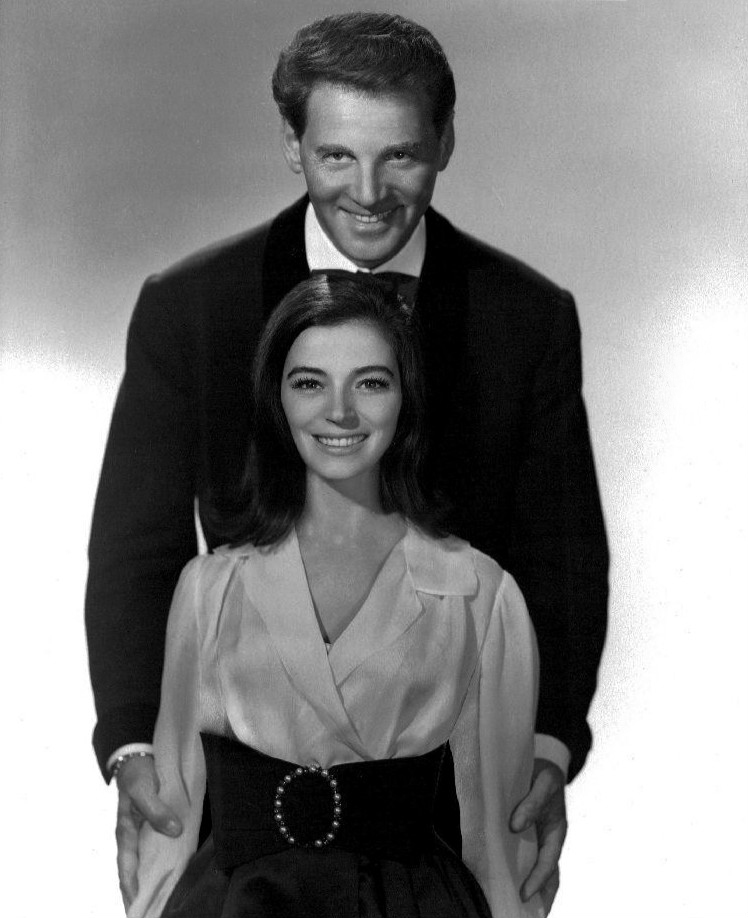
Pavan and Aumont in 1965

Aumont was married four times to three women. His first wife was French actress Blanche Montel, to whom he was married from 1938 to 1940, ultimately divorcing. While in Hollywood, Aumont married Maria Montez, a Dominican actress. She was known as the Queen of Technicolor, and their marriage was very happy. However, Montez drowned in her bathtub on 7 September 1951 after suffering an apparent heart attack at the family's villa in Suresnes. Montez and Aumont had one child, a daughter, Tina (1946–2006).

In 1955, Aumont was dating Grace Kelly at the time she first met Prince Rainier III of Monaco.

In 1956, Aumont married Italian actress Marisa Pavan. The couple starred in John Paul Jones (1959), in which Pavan played the romantic interest of the lead, and Aumont appears as King Louis XVI. They divorced, but later remarried and remained together until his death. Aumont and Pavan had two sons, Jean-Claude and Patrick.

== Death ==
Jean-Pierre Aumont died 30 January 2001 of a heart attack in Gassin, France, aged 90, and was cremated.

== Filmography ==
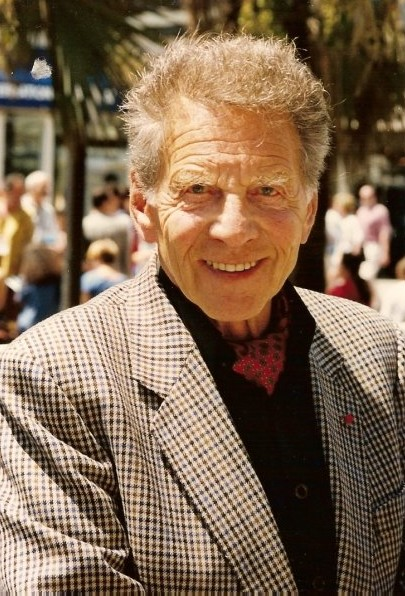
Aumont at the 1993 Cannes Film Festival

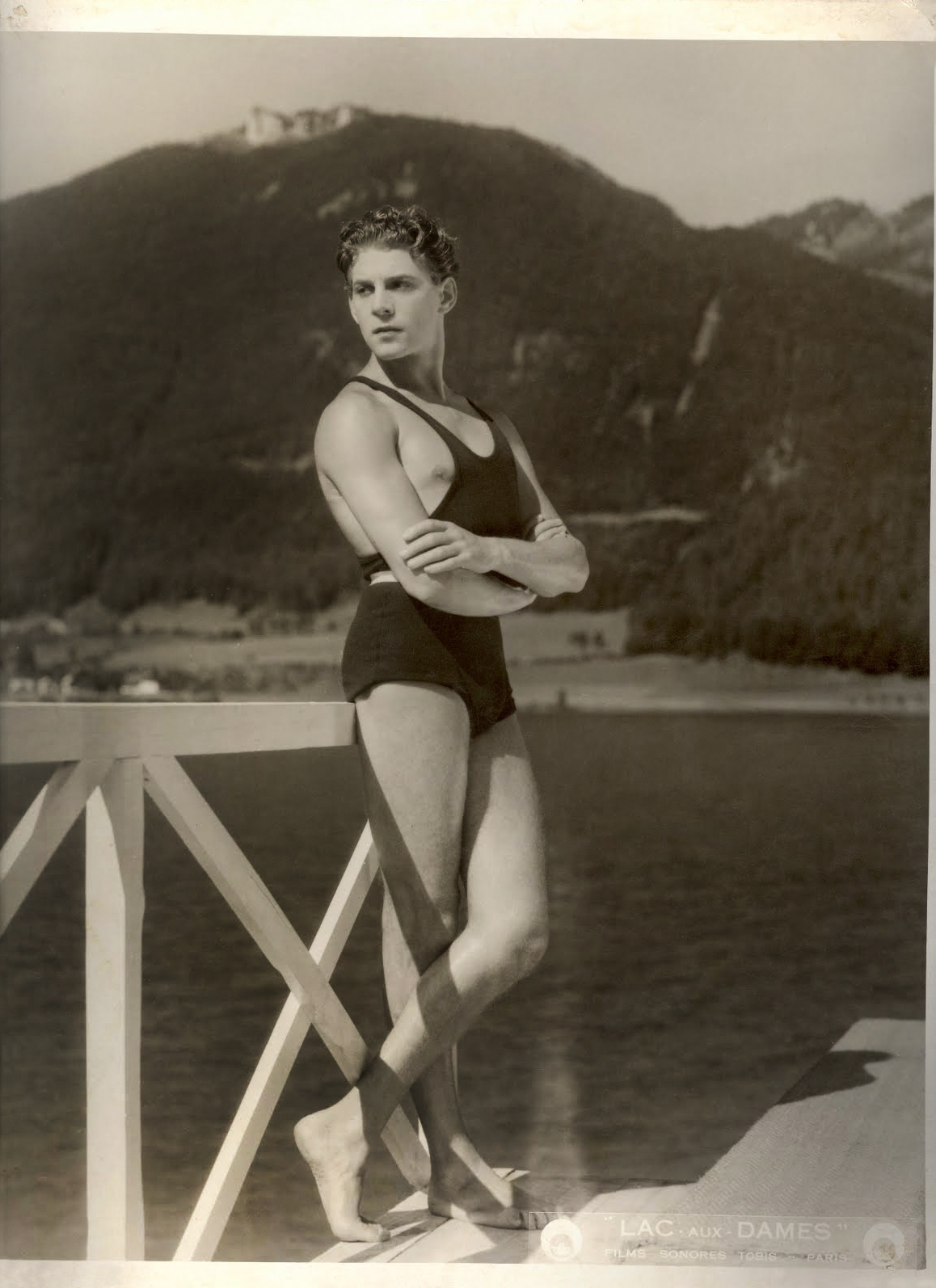
Unknown photographer. 'Jean-Pierre Aumont in "Lac aux Dames"' 1934

=== Film ===
Jean-Pierre Aumont film credits
| Year | Title | Role | Notes | Ref. |
|---|---|---|---|---|
| 1931 | Jean de la Lune | Alexandre (uncredited) | Director: Jean Choux | |
| 1931 | Checkmate | Jacques | Director: Roger Goupillières | |
| 1932 | Should We Wed Them? | Jim | Director: Pierre Billon and Karel Lamač | |
| 1933 | On the Streets | Jacques | Director: Victor Trivas | |
| 1933 | La merveilleuse tragédie de Lourdes | Georges | Director: Henri Fabert | |
| 1933 | Le voleur | Fernand Lagardes | Director: Maurice Tourneur | |
| 1933 | Ève cherche un père | Jacques de la Motte | Director: Mario Bonnard | |
| 1934 | A Day Will Come | Henri de Langillier | Director: Gerhard Lamprecht and Serge Véber | |
| 1934 | Lake of Ladies | Eric Heller | Director: Marc Allégret | |
| 1934 | Maria Chapdelaine | Lorenzo Surprenant | Director: Julien Duvivier | |
| 1935 | Les yeux noirs | Karpoff | Director: Victor Tourjansky | |
| 1935 | The Crew | L'aspirant Jean Herbillon | Director: Anatole Litvak | |
| 1935 | Beautiful Days | Pierre – le premier amoureux de Sylvie | Director: Marc Allégret | |
| 1936 | Taras Bulba | André Boulba | Director: Alexis Granowsky | |
| 1936 | La Porte du large | Pierre Villette | Director: Marcel L'Herbier | |
| 1937 | Cargaison blanche | Henri Voisin | Director: Georges Lacombe | |
| 1937 | The Messenger | Gilbert Rollin | Director: Raymond Rouleau | |
| 1937 | Bizarre, Bizarre | Billy | Director: Marcel Carné | |
| 1937 | Maman Colibri | Georges de Chambry | Director: Jean Dréville | |
| 1938 | The Woman from the End of the World | Lt. Robert Jacquet | Director: Jean Epstein | |
| 1938 | Chéri-Bibi | Raoul Palas | Director: Léon Mathot | |
| 1938 | Beautiful Star | Jean-Pierre | Director: Jacques de Baroncelli | |
| 1938 | S.O.S. Sahara | Paul Moutier | Director: Jacques de Baroncelli | |
| 1938 | Le Paradis de Satan | Jean Larcher | Director: Félix Gandéra | |
| 1938 | Hôtel du Nord | Pierre | Director: Marcel Carné | |
| 1943 | Assignment in Brittany | Bertrand Corlay / Capt. Pierre Matard | as Pierre Aumont. Director: Jack Conway | |
| 1943 | The Cross of Lorraine | Paul Dupré | as Jean Pierre Aumont. Director: Tay Garnett | |
| 1946 | Heartbeat | Pierre de Roche | as Jean Pierre Aumont. Director: Sam Wood | |
| 1947 | Song of Scheherazade | Nikolai Rimsky-Korsakov | Director: Walter Reisch | |
| 1948 | Affairs of a Rogue | Prince Leopold | Director: Alberto Cavalcanti | |
| 1949 | Siren of Atlantis | Andre St. Avit | Director: Gregg G. Tallas | |
| 1949 | Wicked City | Eric Martin, alias Hans Norben | Director: François Villiers | |
| 1949 | Golden Arrow | Andre Marchand | Director: Gordon Parry | |
| 1950 | The Happy Man | Henri Perlis | Director: Gilles Grangier | |
| 1950 | The Straw Lover | Stanislas Michodier | Director: Gilles Grangier | |
| 1951 | Revenge of the Pirates | Enrico di Roccabruna | Director: Primo Zeglio | |
| 1951 | Last Meeting | Michele Bonesi | Director: Gianni Franciolini | |
| 1952 | Wolves Hunt at Night | Cyril | Director: Bernard Borderie | |
| 1953 | Lili | Marc | as Jean Pierre Aumont. Director: Charles Walters | |
| 1953 | Koenigsmark | Le précepteur Raoul Vignerte | Director: Solange Térac | |
| 1953 | The Sparrows of Paris | Césarin | Director: Maurice Cloche | |
| 1954 | Royal Affairs in Versailles | Cardinal de Rohan | Director: Sacha Guitry | |
| 1954 | Charge of the Lancers | Capt. Eric Evoir | Director: William Castle | |
| 1955 | Napoléon | Régnault de Saint-Jean d'Angély | Director: Sacha Guitry | |
| 1955 | Eighteen Hour Stopover | Robert Vitrac | Director: René Jolivet | |
| 1955 | Mademoiselle from Paris | Maurice Darnal | Director: Walter Kapps | |
| 1956 | Hilda Crane | Prof. Jacques De Lisle | Director: Philip Dunne | |
| 1957 | The Seventh Sin | Paul Duvelle | Director: Ronald Neame | |
| 1959 | John Paul Jones | King Louis XVI | Director: John Farrow | |
| 1960 | The Enemy General | Lionel Durand | Director: George Sherman | |
| 1960 | The Devil at 4 O'Clock | Jacques | as Jean Pierre Aumont. Director: Mervyn LeRoy | |
| 1961 | The Blonde from Buenos Aires | the Actor | Director: George Cahan | |
| 1961 | Le Puits aux trois vérités | a spectator at the vernissage | Director: François Villiers | |
| 1962 | The Seven Deadly Sins | the husband | Segment: "L'Orgueuil". Director: Roger Vadim | |
| 1962 | Una domenica d'estate | Valerio | Director: Giulio Petroni | |
| 1962 | Carnival of Crime | Mike Voray | Director: George Cahan | |
| 1962 | Five Miles to Midnight | Alan Stewart | Director: Anatole Litvak | |
| 1963 | Portuguese Vacation | Jean-Pierre | Director: Pierre Kast | |
| 1969 | Castle Keep | Henri Tixier, Count of Maldorais | Director: Sydney Pollack | |
| 1970 | El coleccionista de cadáveres | Claude Marchand | Director: Santos Alcocer and Edward Mann | |
| 1971 | Biribi | Le général | Daniel Moosmann | |
| 1971 | L'Homme au cerveau greffé | Le professeur Jean Marcilly | Director: Jacques Doniol-Valcroze | |
| 1973 | Day for Night | Alexandre | Director: François Truffaut | |
| 1974 | Two Missionaries | Monsignor Delgado | Director: Franco Rossi | |
| 1975 | The Happy Hooker | Yves St Jacques | Director: Nicholas Sgarro | |
| 1975 | Cat and Mouse | Monsieur Richard | Director: Claude Lelouch | |
| 1975 | Mahogany | Christian Rosetti | Director: Berry Gordy | |
| 1975 | Catherine & Co. | Marquis de Puisargue | Director: Michel Boisrond | |
| 1977 | Des journées entières dans les arbres | Jacques – le fils préféré | Director: Marguerite Duras | |
| 1978 | Blackout | Henri Lee | Director: Eddy Matalon | |
| 1978 | Two Solitudes | Jean-Claude Tallard | Director: Lionel Chetwynd | |
| 1979 | Something Short of Paradise | Jean-Fidel Milieu | Director: David Helpern | |
| 1981 | Allons z'enfants | Commandant Félix | Director: Yves Boisset | |
| 1982 | Don't Look in the Attic | Ugo Ressia | Director: Carlo Ausino | |
| 1982 | Difendimi dalla notte | Giacomo Guerra | Director: Claudio Fragasso | |
| 1983 | Nana | Count Muffat | Director: Dan Wolman | |
| 1983 | La java des ombres | Monsieur Jean | Director: Romain Goupil | |
| 1986 | On a volé Charlie Spencer! | Le héros, séq. Hôtel du Nord | Director: Francis Huster | |
| 1987 | Sweet Country | Mr. Araya | Director: Michael Cacoyannis | |
| 1988 | À notre regrettable époux | Alexandre Mouton-Sabrat, dit Moutonni Sabracco | Director: Serge Korber | |
| 1991 | Becoming Colette | Captain Colette | Director: Danny Huston | |
| 1991 | A Star for Two | Alphonse | Director: Jim Kaufman | |
| 1992 | Los mares del sur | Marqués de Munt | Director: Manuel Esteban | |
| 1992 | Les enfants du diable | Le curé | Director: Claude Gaignaire | |
| 1994 | Giorgino | Sebastien | Director: Laurent Boutonnat | |
| 1995 | Jefferson in Paris | D'Hancarville | Director: James Ivory | |
| 1996 | The Proprietor | Franz Legendre | Director: Ismail Merchant | |

=== Television ===
Jean-Pierre Aumont television credits
| Year | Title | Role | Notes | Ref. |
|---|---|---|---|---|
| 1966 | Flipper | Guy Courtney | Episode: "Dolphins Don't Sleep" | |
| 1979 | Beggarman, Thief | Jean Delacroix | TV movie. Director: Lawrence Doheny | |
| 1980 | The Memory of Eva Ryker | Inspector Laurier | TV movie. Director: Walter Grauman | |
| 1984 | The Blood of Others | Monsieur Blomart | TV movie. Director: Claude Chabrol | |
| 1985 | Le regard dans le miroir | Vasco Pessoa | TV miniseries. Director: Jean Chapot | |
| 1986 | Sins | Comte De Ville | TV miniseries. Director: Douglas Hickox | |
| 1992 | Counterstrike | Jean-Jacques Truffaut | Episode: "I Remember It Well" | |
