= McVeagh of the South Seas =

1914 film

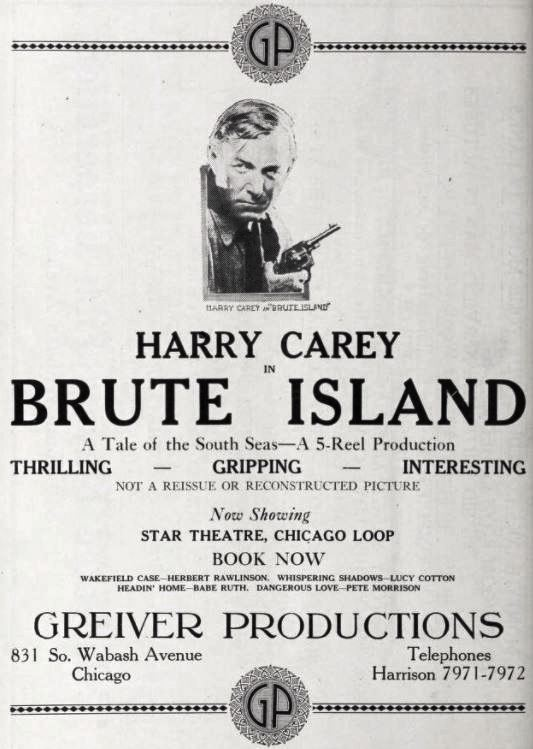
- 1921 advertisement under the reissue title Brute Island
- Directed by: Harry Carey; Cyril Bruce; Gregory Allen (Assistant Director)
- Written by: Harry Carey
- Produced by: The Progressive Motion Picture Company
- Starring: Harry Carey
- Distributed by: Alliance Films Corporation
- Release date: November 2, 1914
- Running time: 5 reels
- Country: United States
- Language: Silent (English intertitles)

McVeagh of the South Seas is a 1914 American drama film directed by and starring Harry Carey. The film was reissued under the title Brute Island and has been released on DVD under that title.

== Plot ==
A shipwreck near the Solomon Islands leaves San Franciscan Harmon Darrell (Terry) and his daughter Nancy (Butler) adrift in a lifeboat. Cyril McVeagh (Carey) a ship's captain reduced to drunkenness and brutality by his shattered love affair with Nancy, rules one of the islands, accompanied only by his deranged mate "Pearly" Gates (Russell) and the island's natives. McVeagh is about to marry Liana (Foster), a native who loves him but is desired by Pearly, when Nancy arrives on the island, horrified at McVeagh's dissipation. Tanarka, Liana's former betrothed, leads a native rebellion against McVeagh, who sends Nancy away in a boat before the attack. McVeagh struggles with his crazed mate in his burning shack before Pearly recovers his reason and the two hurriedly leave the island. Liana, believing McVeagh dead, remains behind to mourn him, while McVeagh sets a course for San Francisco and civilization.

== Cast ==
- Harry Carey as Cyril Bruce McVeagh
- Fern Foster as Liana
- Herbert Russell as "Pearly" Gates
- Kathleen Butler as Nancy Darrell
- Jack Terry as Harmon Darrell

== See also ==
- Harry Carey filmography
- South Seas genre
