= Frank Skinner (composer) =

American film composer and arranger

- Born: December 31, 1897; Meredosia, Illinois, United States
- Died: October 9, 1968 (aged 70) Hollywood, California, United States
- Genre: Film score
- Occupation: Composer

Frank Skinner (December 31, 1897 – October 9, 1968) was an American film composer and arranger.

== In Popular Culture ==
In 2014, Dallas pre-swing orchestra The Singapore Slingers released a fifteen-track CD homage to Skinner's arrangements.

== Partial filmography ==
- The Rage of Paris (1938)
- Son of Frankenstein (1939)
- Big Town Czar (1939)
- Charlie McCarthy, Detective (1939)
- The Spirit of Culver (1939)
- The Sun Never Sets (1939)
- Rio (1939)
- Destry Rides Again (1939)
- The Invisible Man Returns (1940)
- The House of the Seven Gables (1940)
- Green Hell (1940)
- My Little Chickadee (1940)
- Hired Wife (1940)
- When the Daltons Rode (1940)
- Seven Sinners (1940)
- Back Street (1941)
- The Wolf Man (1941, with Hans J. Salter, uncredited)
- South of Tahiti (1941)
- Appointment for Love (1941)
- Hellzapoppin (1941)
- Too Many Blondes (1941)
- The Lady from Cheyenne (1941)
- Lady in a Jam (1942)
- Who Done It? (1942)
- Jail House Blues (1942)
- Saboteur (1942)
- Broadway (1942)
- Ride 'Em Cowboy (1942)
- Eagle Squadron (1942)
- Sherlock Holmes and the Voice of Terror (1942)
- Nightmare (1942)
- Sherlock Holmes and the Secret Weapon (1942)
- Arabian Nights (1942)
- Pittsburgh (1942)
- Hers to Hold (1943)
- White Savage (1943)
- Two Tickets to London (1943)
- Sherlock Holmes in Washington (1943)
- The Amazing Mrs. Holliday (1943)
- Fired Wife (1943)
- We've Never Been Licked (1943)
- Gung Ho! (1943)
- Hi, Beautiful (1944)
- Destiny (1944)
- The Suspect (1944)
- Frontier Gal (1945)
- The Runaround (1946)
- Black Angel (1946)
- Night in Paradise (1946)
- Swell Guy (1946)
- The Egg and I (1947)
- Ride the Pink Horse (1947)
- Smash-Up, the Story of a Woman (1947)
- The Exile (1947)
- I'll Be Yours (1947)
- For the Love of Mary (1948)
- Family Honeymoon (1948)
- The Naked City (1948)
- Hazard (1948)
- Abbott and Costello Meet Frankenstein (1948)
- Tap Roots (1948)
- The Fighting O'Flynn (1949)
- The Life of Riley (1949)
- The Lady Gambles (1949)
- Tulsa (1949)
- Sword in the Desert (1949)
- The Gal Who Took the West (1949)
- Free for All (1949)
- Francis (1950)
- Comanche Territory (1950)
- Louisa (1950)
- One Way Street (1950)
- The Desert Hawk (1950)
- The Sleeping City (1950)
- Harvey (1950)
- Double Crossbones (1951)
- Katie Did It (1951)
- Bedtime for Bonzo (1951)
- Francis Goes to the Races (1951)
- Bright Victory (1951)
- The Mark of the Renegade (1951)
- The Lady Pays Off (1951)
- The Raging Tide (1951)
- Week-End with Father (1951)
- No Room for the Groom (1952)
- Bonzo Goes to College (1952)
- It Grows on Trees (1952)
- The World in His Arms (1952)
- Because of You (1952)
- Desert Legion (1953)
- Thunder Bay (1953)
- The Man from the Alamo (1953)
- Wings of the Hawk (1953)
- The Stand at Apache River (1953)
- Back to God's Country (1953)
- Forbidden (1953)
- Taza, Son of Cochise (1954)
- Magnificent Obsession (1954)
- Chief Crazy Horse (1955)
- The Shrike (1955)
- Foxfire (1955)
- One Desire (1955)
- All That Heaven Allows (1955)
- Never Say Goodbye (1956)
- Star in the Dust (1956)
- The Rawhide Years (1956)
- Written on the Wind (1956)
- The Snow Queen (1957 film) (1957)
- The Tattered Dress (1957)
- Interlude (1957)
- Tammy and the Bachelor (1957)
- Man of a Thousand Faces (1957)
- My Man Godfrey (1957)
- This Happy Feeling (1958)
- The Tarnished Angels (1958)
- Kathy O' (1958)
- The Perfect Furlough (1958)
- Imitation of Life (1959)
- Portrait in Black (1960)
- Midnight Lace (1960)
- Back Street (1961)
- Tammy and the Doctor (1963)
- Captain Newman, M.D. (1963)
- The Ugly American (1963)
- Bullet for a Badman (1964)
- Shenandoah (1965)
- The Appaloosa (1966)
- Madame X (1966)
