= South of Tahiti =

1941 film by George Waggner

- Directed by: George Waggner
- Screenplay by: Gerald Geraghty
- Story by: Ainsworth Morgan
- Produced by: George Waggner
- Starring: Brian Donlevy; Broderick Crawford; Andy Devine; Maria Montez
- Cinematography: Elwood Bredell
- Edited by: Frank Gross
- Music by: Frank Skinner
- Color process: Black and white
- Production company: Universal Pictures
- Distributed by: Universal Pictures
- Release date: October 17, 1941
- Running time: 78 minutes
- Country: United States
- Language: English

South of Tahiti is a 1941 American south seas adventure film directed by George Waggner and starring Brian Donlevy, Broderick Crawford and Andy Devine. It helped launch fourth-billed Maria Montez as a pin-up star. The response was such that Universal Pictures then cast her in Arabian Nights.

== Plot ==
Three pearl hunters wind up stranded on a South Pacific island. While one of them falls in love with the daughter of a tribal leader, his two companions are more concerned with robbing the tribe's golden treasure.

== Cast ==
- Brian Donlevy as Bob
- Broderick Crawford as Chuck
- Andy Devine as Moose
- Maria Montez as Melahi
- Henry Wilcoxon as Captain Larkin
- H. B. Warner as High Chief Kawalima
- Armida as Tutara
- Abner Biberman as Tahawa
- Ignacio Sáenz as Kuala
- Frank Lackteen as Besar
- Barbara Pepper as Julie
- Belle Mitchell as Taupa
- Frank Brownlee as Harbor Master
- Tom Steele as Brawling Sailor

== Production ==
The film was intended to be Montez's first starring vehicle. It was originally known as Captive Wild Woman and was to star Montez, Brian Donlevy, Broderick Crawford and Andy Devine. Then its name was changed to White Savage. Gerald Geraghty and Ainsworth Morgan were originally reported as working on the script.

Henry Wilcoxon was then announced for the role of the main villain. The script was rewritten so his character survived at the end.

== See also ==
- List of American films of 1941

== Bibliography ==
- Fetrow, Alan G. Feature Films, 1940-1949: a United States Filmography. McFarland, 1994.
