= Boss of Bullion City =

1940 film by Ray Taylor

- Film poster
- Directed by: Ray Taylor
- Screenplay by: Arthur St. Claire; Victor McLeod
- Story by: Arthur St. Claire
- Produced by: Will Cowan
- Starring: Johnny Mack Brown
- Cinematography: William A. Sickner
- Edited by: Paul Landres
- Production company: Universal Pictures
- Distributed by: Universal Pictures
- Release date: March 1, 1940
- Running time: 61 minutes
- Country: United States
- Language: English

Boss of Bullion City is a 1940 American Western film directed by Ray Taylor and starring Johnny Mack Brown.

Maria Montez appears as the female lead. It was the first time she played a leading role and was the only one of her film roles where she speaks some Spanish.

== Plot ==
Tom Bryant exposes a corrupt sheriff.

== Cast ==
- Johnny Mack Brown as Tom Bryant
- Fuzzy Knight as Burt Pennycracker
- Nell O'Day as Martha Hadley
- Maria Montez as Linda Calhoun
- Harry Woods as Sheriff Jeff Salter
- Melvin Lang as Deputy Fred Wallace
- Dick Alexander as Steve
- Earle Hodgins as Mike Calhoun
- Karl Hackett as Deputy Tug
- George Humbert as Mario
