= Passion Fruit (film) =

1921 film

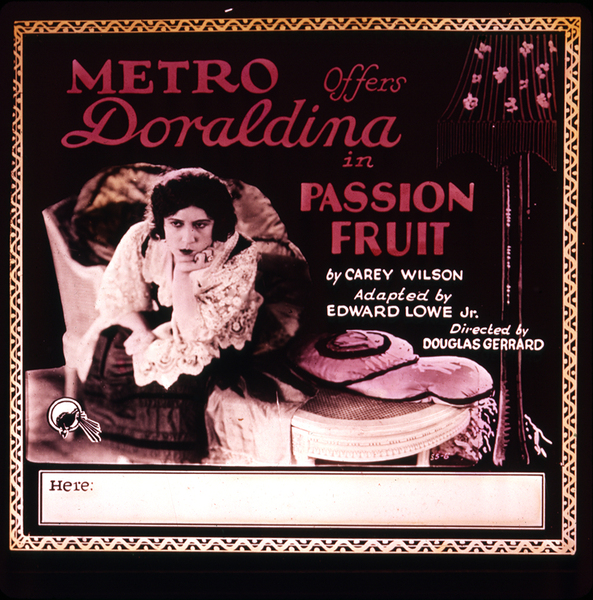
- Lantern slide
- Directed by: John Ince (or Douglas Gerrard per slide)
- Written by: Edward T. Lowe
- Based on: screen story by Carey Wilson
- Produced by: Metro Pictures; Louis B. Mayer
- Starring: Doraldina
- Cinematography: Rudolph Bergquist
- Distributed by: Metro Pictures
- Release date: February 7, 1921
- Running time: six reels
- Country: USA
- Language: Silent..English intertitles

Passion Fruit is a lost 1921 silent film south seas romance directed by John Ince and starring dancer Doraldina. It was produced and distributed by Metro Pictures.

The production was filmed in Monterey, California. There is conflicting information as to the director; some sources list John Ince as director while period adverts have Douglas Gerrard as the director.

== Cast ==
- Doraldina - Regina Dominant
- Edward Earle - Pierce Lamont
- Stuart Holmes - Anders Rance
- Sidney Bracey - The Ancient
- Florence Turner - Nuanua
- W. H. Bainbridge

== See also ==
- South Seas genre
