= Wicked City (1949 film) =

1949 film by François Villiers

- Directed by: François Villiers
- Written by: Jean-Pierre Aumont; François Villiers
- Based on: the novel Hans Le Marin by Edouard Peisson
- Produced by: Andre Sarrut
- Starring: Maria Montez; Jean-Pierre Aumont; Lilli Palmer
- Cinematography: Jean Bourgoin
- Edited by: Henri Taverna
- Music by: Joseph Kosma
- Color process: Black and white
- Production companies: Films Caravelle; Sagitta Film
- Distributed by: DisCina
- Release date: 16 November 1949 (Paris)
- Running time: 91 minutes
- Country: France
- Language: French
- Budget: 80,000 francs (US $250,000)
- Box office: 1,891,994 admissions (France)

Wicked City (French: Hans le marin; alternate title: The Last Port) is a 1949 French crime film directed by François Villiers and starring the husband-and-wife team of Jean-Pierre Aumont and Maria Montez. It was Montez's first film in Europe.

Wicked City and The Man on the Eiffel Tower were the first French-American film co-productions following World War II.

== Plot ==
Hans is a Canadian sailor docked in Marseilles who is having an affair with cabaret owner Dolores. When he is robbed and left for dead, he awakens to discover that Dolores has disappeared. He takes on a job as a nightclub bouncer and has a fling with gypsy girl Tania.

== Cast ==
- Maria Montez as Dolores - I'entraîneuse
- Jean-Pierre Aumont as Eric Martin, alias Hans Norhen
- Lilli Palmer as Tania - la gitane
- Marcel Dalio as Aimé - un nervi
- Pierre Bertin as Le monsieur sérieux
- Grégoire Aslan as Le Brésilien (as Coco Aslan)
- Roland Toutain as Le rabatteur
- Roger Elin as Emilio
- Catherine Damet as Suzy - une entraîneuse
- Georges Hubert as L'inspecteur
- Lita Recio as La patronne
- Georges Jamin as Le commissaire
- Dinan as Himself
- Frédéric O'Brady as Le chef des gitans (as O'Brady)
- Jean-Marie Simon as Le petit (as Poupy Simon)
- Jean Roy as Victor - un nevri
- Kosta Alex as Himself
- Lawson Mooney as Himself
- Jacques Guelis as Himself
- Claude Malfrayt as Petit rôle
- Les Ballets Choucoune as Himself
- Noël Chiboust as Et Son Quartett

== Production ==
Aumont served with the Free French army during World War II and was wounded by shrapnel near Marseilles in 1944. While recuperating, he read the novel Hans le marin by Edouard Peisson, and in 1946 he, his wife and his brother François Villiers visited Peisson to negotiate to purchase the film rights. Aumont was to write the script, Villiers was to direct and Montez and Aumont would star. The goal was to show Montez "is an actress as well as a manikin."

Andre Sarrut of Safia Productions agreed to pay the production costs of the film, up to 80,000 francs (then US$250,000). Aumont was to produce through his company with Montez, Christina Productions. Christina provided the services of Aumont, Montez and Lilli Palmer; in exchange, Christina's share would be paid off first out of American box-office receipts.

Filming began in Marseilles in July 1948. Approximately 60% of the film was shot on location, with the remainder filmed at the Joinville Studios in Paris.
