= Song of India (film) =

1949 film by Albert S. Rogell

- Directed by: Albert S. Rogell
- Screenplay by: Art Arthur; Kenneth Perkins
- Story by: Jerome Odlum
- Produced by: Albert S. Rogell
- Starring: Sabu; Gail Russell; Turhan Bey; Anthony Caruso; Aminta Dyne; Fritz Leiber
- Cinematography: Henry Freulich
- Edited by: Charles Nelson
- Music by: Alexander Laszlo based on N. Rimsky-Korsakoff's Song of India
- Production company: Columbia Pictures
- Distributed by: Columbia Pictures
- Release date: February 28, 1949
- Running time: 77 minutes
- Country: United States
- Language: English

Song of India is a 1949 American adventure film directed and produced by Albert S. Rogell and starring Sabu, Gail Russell and Turhan Bey. It was produced and distributed by Columbia Pictures.

== Plot ==
Jungle adventure drama about a young man and his wild animal friends attempting to thwart a government-approved hunting expedition.

== Cast ==
- Sabu as Ramdar
- Gail Russell as Princess Tara
- Turhan Bey as Prince Gopal
- Anthony Caruso as Major Doraj
- Aminta Dyne as Aunt Shayla
- Fritz Leiber as Namaram
- Trevor Bardette as Rewa
- Robert H. Barrat as Maharajah of Ramjat

Uncredited (in order of appearance)
Ian MacDonald	uniformed messenger who reads Prince Gopal's proclamation
Ethan Laidlaw	communications sergeant who says, "number seven just tripped, your highness"
John George	villager walking past Ramdar as he arrives to greet Namaram
Jay Silverheels	villager who turns his back on Ramdar when he returns to the village
Al Kikume	Sergeant Tandu, leading the soldiers in search of Princess Tara
Rodd Redwing	Kumari, villager sent by Namaram to "go... seek him out... if need be... try the temple"

== Production ==
Filming took place on 19 June 1948, after two weeks of second unit filming. Gail Russell was borrowed from Paramount Pictures.
