= Gypsy Wildcat =

1944 film by Roy William Neill

- Original film poster
- Directed by: Roy William Neil
- Screenplay by: James P. Hogan; Gene Lewis; James M. Cain
- Story by: James P. Hogan; Ralph Stock
- Produced by: George Waggner
- Starring: Maria Montez; Jon Hall; Peter Coe
- Cinematography: W. Howard Greene; George Robinson
- Edited by: Russell F. Schoengarth
- Music by: Edward Ward
- Production company: Universal Pictures
- Distributed by: Universal Pictures
- Release date: August 2, 1944 (United States)
- Running time: 77 minutes
- Country: United States
- Language: English
- Box office: 2,426,447 admissions (France)

Gypsy Wildcat is a 1944 Technicolor adventure film directed by Roy William Neil starring Maria Montez, Jon Hall and Peter Coe. It was co-written by James M. Cain.

== Plot ==
A king's messenger (Jon Hall) protects a Gypsy dancer (Maria Montez) from a wicked baron who knows her secret.

== Cast ==
- Maria Montez as Carla
- Jon Hall as Michael
- Peter Coe as Tonio
- Nigel Bruce as High Sheriff
- Leo Carrillo as Anube
- Gale Sondergaard as Rhoda
- Douglass Dumbrille as Baron Tovar
- Curt Bois as Valdi
- Harry Cording as Captain Marver

== Production ==
After the success of Arabian Nights Universal requested a series of films starring Montez, Hall and Sabu. It was followed by White Savage and Cobra Woman. The studio then requested three more, Ali Baba and the Forty Thieves, a gypsy tale, Zorya, and a tale of the modernisation of Turkey.

James Hogan was signed to write and direct Zorya which became Gypsy Girl then Gypsy Wildcat. He fell ill so he was replaced by Roy William Neill.

James M Cain was hired to work on the dialogue. He later said he agreed to do it because Universal guaranteed him two weeks work. They showed him a Maria Montez film "so I would know what kind of a creature I was writing for", he said years later. "Well, when she came on screen, I suddenly realized that I knew this girl personally. Her voice and every gesture were completely familiar to me. But I have yet to figure out where I met this girl. I think she must have checked hats some place in Hollywood."

Cain said he took and script "worked on it day and night, got order into the story and simplified it. I turned in the script and thought, "I've done something that makes sense"." When he left the studio, he walked past the office of producer George Waggner to say thanks and saw him rewriting the script. Cain said he was sorry the producer did not like it. Waggner said he was "delighted with what" Cain had done but said Montez "couldn't play your dialogue. It has to be translated into the kind of baby talk she can handle... I'm pinching myself for the wonderful thing you've done with this bad dream I threw at you. Now I can put this thing in front of a camera."

Cain said the script "was the beginning of a new phase of my picture career. After that I was a professional at the business; after that, I did all right" even though he did not have many credits.

Filming started October 1943.

The role of Tonio was meant to be played by Turhan Bey. However he was loaned at the last minute to MGM to play a role in Dragon Seed and was replaced by Peter Coe. Coe was a former swimming champion, Acquacade performer and stage actor. He later claimed that he and Montez had an affair.

Neill reportedly was one of Maria Montez's few directors to not fight with her.

"My other pictures were just corn", said Montez. "This one is more golden bantam. I'm tired of being a fairy tale princess all the time. In every picture I have royal blood. I told the studio I wanted to do something else. I thought everything was fixed when they put me in Gypsy Wildcat. But do you know what happens at the end of that picture? I turn out to be a countess."

== See also ==
- List of American films of 1944
