= Doraldina =

American dancer (1888–1936)

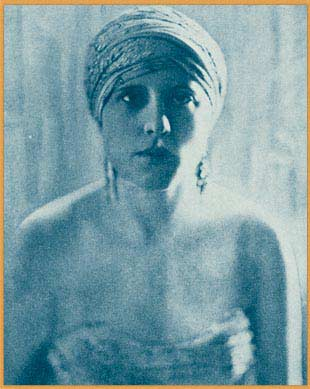
- Born: Dora Saunders; 1888; San Francisco, California
- Died: February 13, 1936; Los Angeles, California
- Occupation: actress
- Spouse: Frank Saunders

Doraldina (1888–1936) was an American dancer and one of the Metro Pictures film stars. She was Dora Saunders after her marriage to Frank Saunders. Though given a splendid opportunity to display her histrionic talents as an actress, she would, nevertheless, retain in her pictures the familiar Hawaiian setting with which her legion of admirers had come to associate her.

Beginning her career as a manicurist in a San Francisco hotel, Doraldina's rise to fame and stardom came as a fitting climax to a career during which she put forth every effort to please a discriminating public. Studying the dancing art first in New York City, and then in Barcelona, Spain, she returned to New York where her career as dancer, actress, and screen star made of her a national figure. Her first Metro production was Passion Fruit (1921). Her cause of death was a heart attack.

== Filmography ==
- The Naulahka (1918)
- The Woman Untamed (1920)
- Passion Fruit (1921)
