= Al Kikume =

American actor and musician

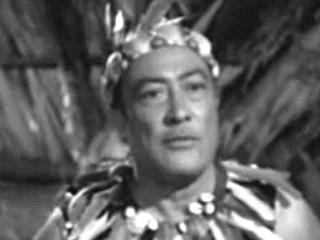
- Kikume in Bela Lugosi Meets a Brooklyn Gorilla, 1952
- Born: Elmer Kikumi Gozier; October 9, 1894; Kauaʻi County, Hawaii, U.S.
- Died: March 27, 1972 (aged 77); Los Angeles, California, U.S.
- Other name: Elmer Kikume
- Occupations: Actor, stuntman, musician, bandleader
- Years active: 1933–1954
- Spouse(s): Virgil Edna Smith (m. circa 1911; died 1925)
- Children: Bernard Kikume Gozier (aka Bernie Gozier)

Al Kikume (born Elmer Kikumi Gozier; October 9, 1894 – March 27, 1972) was an American actor, musician, and bandleader of Hawaiian descent. He was a frequently featured musical performer—on radio, preceding silent film screenings, and at miscellaneous live events—during the 1920s and early thirties, as well as a familiar face among supporting actors in Hollywood jungle movies during the thirties, forties and fifties.

== Early life and career ==
Kikume was born in Kauaʻi County, Hawaii. Known for his association with Honolulu's Royal Hawaiian Band, as well as revivals of the Broadway play, Bird of Paradise, Kikume's first credited screen appearance was as "Chief Mehevi" in John Ford's The Hurricane (1937).

== Personal life and death ==
By no later than 1911, Kikume was married to Virgil Edna Smith, with whom he had one son, Bernard Kikume Gozier, aka Bernie Gozier. Gozier went on to have a substantial Hollywood career of his own, both as bit player and stuntman, appearing in at least one film, Green Dolphin Street, alongside his father.

Kikume died in Los Angeles on March 27, 1972.

== Partial filmography ==
- Hula (1937) – Native musician accompanying Clara Bow's hula dance
- Tarzan the Fearless (1933)
- The Perils of Pauline (1933) serial
- Charlie Chan At the Olympics (1937)"
- The Hurricane (1937) – Chief Mehevi
- Air Devils (1938) – Don Kahano
- Mandrake the Magician (1939) serial
- Typhoon (1940)
- South of Pago Pago (1940)
- Jungle Girl (1941) serial
- Perils of Nyoka (1942) serial
- White Savage (1943)
- She Gets Her Man (1945) – Joe
- Song of the Sarong (1945)
- Green Dolphin Street (1947)
- On the Isle of Samoa (1950) – Chief Tihati
- Bela Lugosi Meets a Brooklyn Gorilla (1952)
