= Sabu (actor) =

Indian-American actor (1924–1963)

Sabu Dastagir
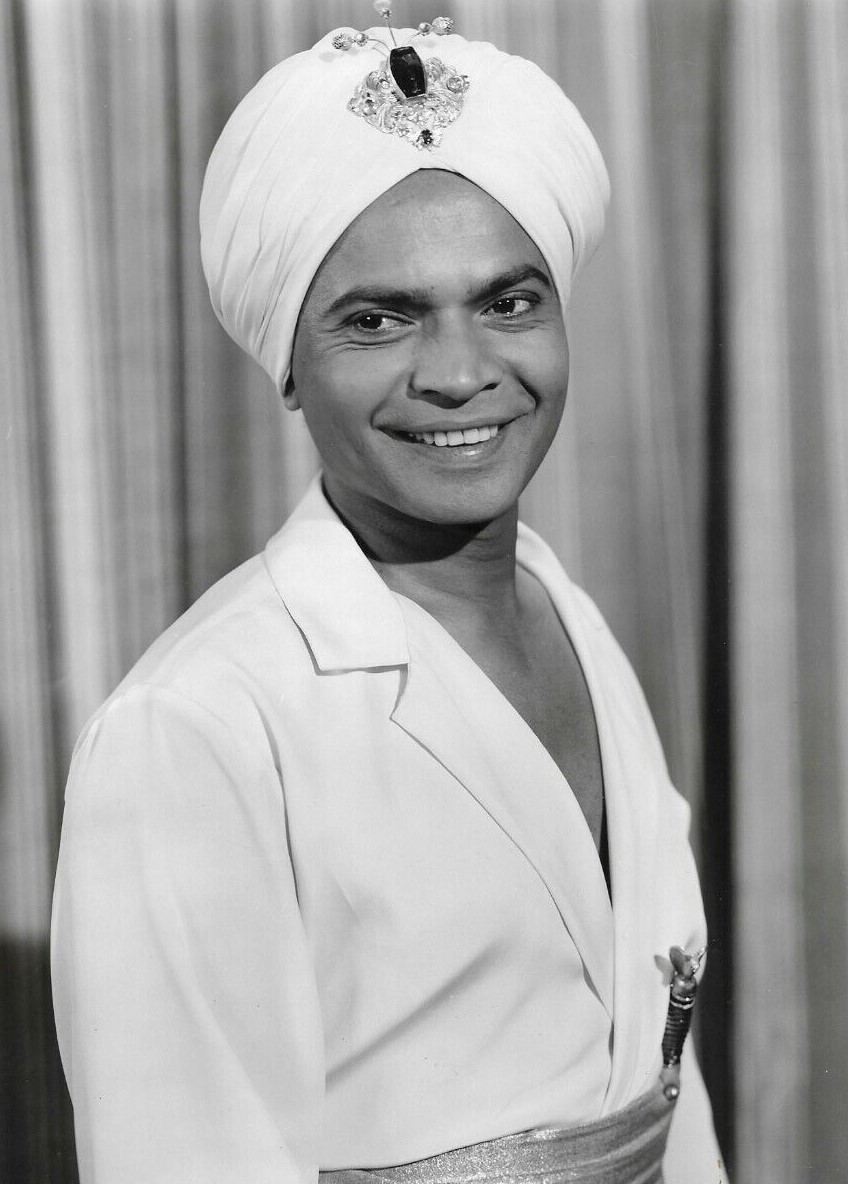
- Dastagir in Sabu and the Magic Ring (1957)
- Born: Selar Sabu; 27 January 1924; Karapura, Mysore, Kingdom of Mysore, British India (now Karnataka, India)
- Died: 2 December 1963 (aged 39); Chatsworth, Los Angeles, California, U.S.
- Other name: Sabu
- Citizenship: British subject; United States (after 1944)
- Occupation: Actor
- Years active: 1937–1963
- Spouse: Marilyn Cooper (m. 1948)
- Children: 2, including Paul Sabu
- Military career
- Allegiance: United States
- Branch: United States Army Air Forces
- Service years: 1944–45
- Rank: Sergeant
- Units: Far East Air Force; 307th Bomb Group; 370th Bombardment Squadron
- Conflicts: World War II; Southwest Pacific Theatre
- Awards: Distinguished Flying Cross (DFC)

Sabu Dastagir (born Selar Sabu; 27 January 1924 – 2 December 1963) was an Indian and American actor, typically credited mononymously Sabu. He is primarily known for his work in films during the 1930s–1940s in Britain and the United States. He notably played starring roles in Elephant Boy (1937), The Drum (1938), The Thief of Bagdad (1940), and Black Narcissus (1947). Screenonline described him as "Britain's first above-the-title film star of Indian origin - indeed, for many years India's only truly international star."

== Early life ==
Sabu was born in 1924 in Karapura, Mysore, Kingdom of Mysore, then a Princely State of British India. His father was a mahout (elephant keeper/trainer) and was Deccani. His mother was Assamese. While most reference books list his full name as "Sabu Dastagir" (which was the name he used legally), research by journalist Philip Leibfried suggests that his birth name was in fact Selar Sabu.

== Career ==
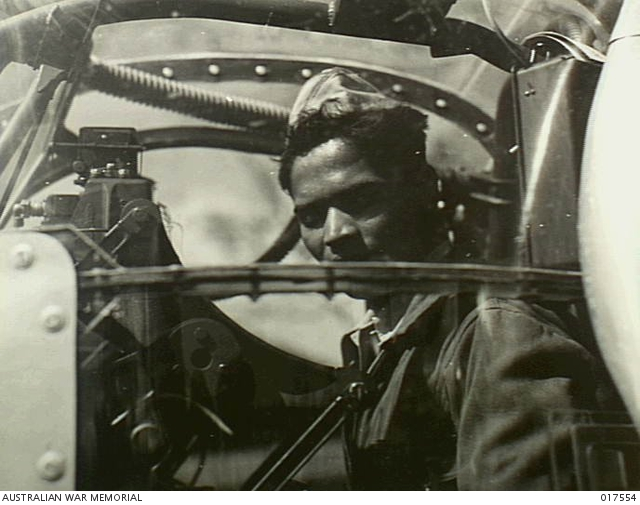
Sabu served in the U.S. Army Air Forces during World War II.

When he was 13, Sabu was discovered by documentary filmmaker Robert Flaherty, who cast him in the role of an elephant driver in the 1937 British film Elephant Boy. This was adapted from "Toomai of the Elephants", a story by Rudyard Kipling. In 1938 producer Alexander Korda commissioned A. E. W. Mason to write The Drum as a starring vehicle for the young actor. Sabu is perhaps best known for his role as Abu in the 1940 fantasy adventure film The Thief of Bagdad. Director Michael Powell said that Sabu had a "wonderful grace" about him. In 1942, Sabu played another role based on a Kipling story, namely Mowgli in Rudyard Kipling's Jungle Book, directed by Zoltan Korda, which was shot entirely in California. He starred alongside Maria Montez and Jon Hall in three films for Universal Pictures: Arabian Nights (1942), White Savage (1943) and Cobra Woman (1944).

=== Military service ===
After becoming an American citizen in 1944, Sabu joined the U.S. Army Air Forces and served as a tail gunner and ball-turret gunner on B-24 Liberators. He flew several dozen missions with the 370th Bombardment Squadron of the 307th Bomb Group in the Pacific, and was awarded the Distinguished Flying Cross for his valor and bravery. In 2024, U.S Air Force celebrated his success by conducting portrait unveiling ceremony in the Pentagon’s World War II hallway. Seven United States Air Force Academy cadets joined the event and spoke of the event’s significance.

=== Post-war career ===
His career declined after World War II. He was unable to secure equivalent roles in Hollywood that British films had offered. He occasionally did gain significant parts, such as roles in the British films Black Narcissus and The End of the River (both 1947). Through most of the 1950s he starred in largely unsuccessful European films. In 1952, he starred in the Harringay Circus with an elephant act.

He was considered for the role of Birju in Mehboob Khan's 1957 film Mother India, which would have marked his debut in Hindi films, but was denied a work permit and the role ended up going to Sunil Dutt. Sabu never got to appear in a film made in his native country. In 1963, he made a comeback to Hollywood with a supporting role in Rampage opposite Robert Mitchum. He played another supporting role alongside Brian Keith in the Disney film A Tiger Walks. This would turn out to be his final role. He died three months before the film was released on March 12, 1964.

== Personal life ==
On 19 October 1948, Sabu married little-known actress Marilyn Cooper (whose only film part, as Princess Tara in Song of India in 1949, was not credited), with whom he had two children. Their marriage lasted until his death. Their son, Paul Sabu, established the rock band Sabu in the 1980s. Their daughter, Jasmine Sabu (died 2001), was an animal trainer for the motion picture industry.

Sabu was the subject of a paternity suit. A dancer with whom he had appeared in Black Narcissus, Brenda Marian Julier, alleged that he was the father of her daughter Michaela, born in 1948. At the time of the trial, in October 1950, Julier had married Frank Ernst. The jury found in favor of Sabu by a vote of 9 to 3. However, in March 1952, an appeals court reversed the verdict and ordered a new trial, finding the trial judge's jury instructions were erroneous and prejudicial, and that Sabu's attorney had effectively put Julier on trial. The day the second trial was scheduled to begin, in July 1953, the actor settled the case without admitting paternity. He agreed to defray Julier's costs, set up a trust fund, and pay monthly support until the child reached 21. At that time, Ernst stated his intent to adopt the girl.

In November 1950, a fire destroyed the second storey of his Los Angeles home. Arthur E. Wall and Andre Perez were arrested for arson shortly afterward; Perez pleaded guilty in July 1951. He revealed that he was asked to set the fire by Wall, Sabu's friend, who told him the actor needed the insurance money. Sabu's insurer, Northwestern Mutual, had originally paid out his claim, but sued him in November 1952 after learning about the purported arson.

Sabu's brother, known as Shaik Dastagir, managed his career. In 1960, Shaik was shot dead at his home during a botched robbery. The perpetrator, 18-year-old Jimmy E. Shields, was a former employee at the brothers' furniture store. He was convicted of involuntary manslaughter and sentenced to 1 to 10 years in prison.

=== Death ===
On 2 December 1963, Sabu died suddenly in Chatsworth, California, of a heart attack, age 39. He is interred at the Forest Lawn – Hollywood Hills Cemetery.

== Legacy ==
During the peak of his career, Sabu was one of the few Indian-born film actors to gain an international profile. (Note: Bombay-born Merle Oberon was a major leading lady during the Golden Age of Hollywood, but concealed her Anglo-Indian origin for most of her life.) The British Film Institute's Screenonline described him as "Britain's first above-the-title film star of Indian origin - indeed, for many years India's only truly international star."

American professional wrestler Sabu (real name Terrance Brunk) adopted his ring name from the actor, of whom his uncle Ed "The Sheik" Farhat was an admirer.

Singer-songwriter John Prine wrote a song about Sabu, imagining his culture shock touring America on a promotional trip in winter, "Sabu Visits the Twin Cities Alone," recorded for his 1978 album Bruised Orange. The chorus goes, "Hey look, Ma, here comes the elephant boy / Bundled all up in his corduroy / Headed down south towards Illinois / From the jungles of East St. Paul." Prine called it the strangest song he wrote.

== Filmography ==
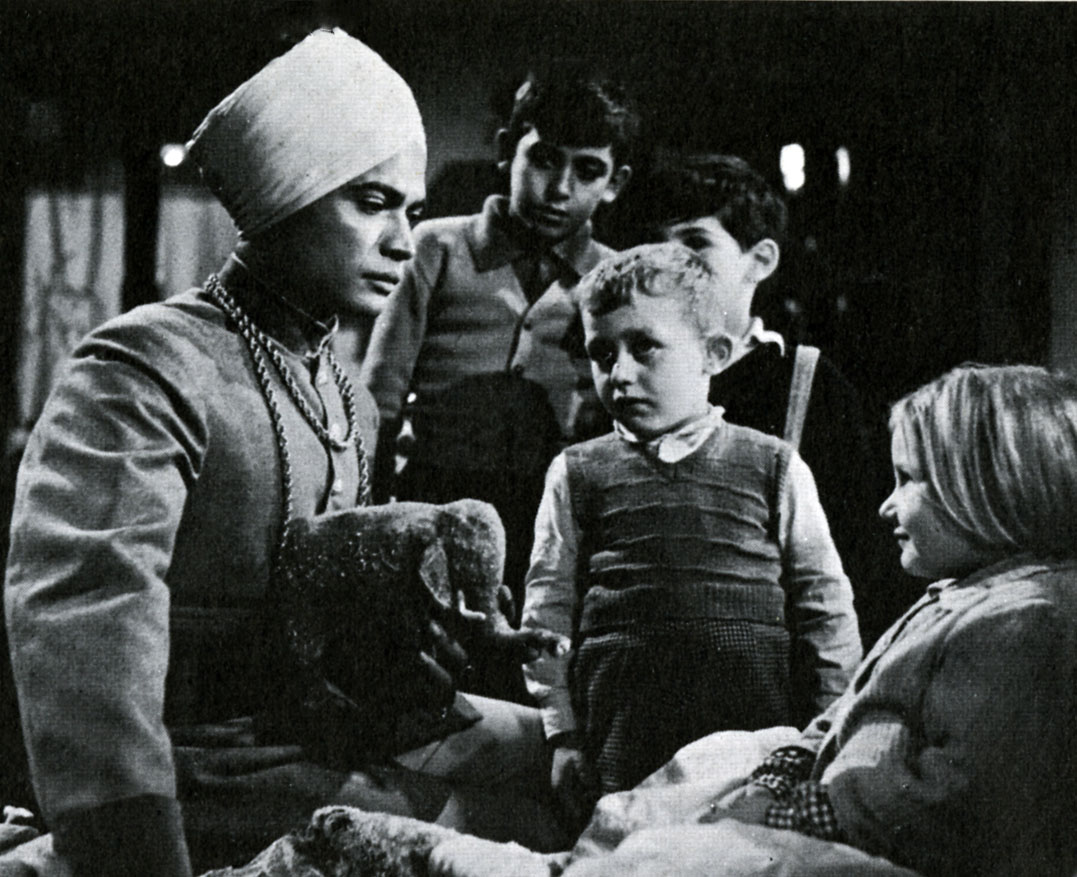
Sabu in Hello Elephant (1952)

Year	Title	Role	Notes
1937	Elephant Boy	Toomai	
1938	The Drum	Prince Azim	
1940	The Thief of Bagdad	Abu	
1942	Jungle Book	Mowgli	
1942	Arabian Nights	Ali Ben Ali	
1943	White Savage	Orano	
1944	Cobra Woman	Kado	
1946	Tangier	Pepe	
1947	Black Narcissus	The Young General	
1947	The End of the River	Manoel	
1948	Man-Eater of Kumaon	Narain	
1949	Song of India	Ramdar	
1951	Savage Drums	Tipo Tairu	
1952	Hello Elephant	Sultan of Nagore	
1952	Bagdad		
1954	The Treasure of Bengal	Ainur	
1956	Jaguar	Juano	
1956	Jungle Hell	Sabu the Jungle Boy	
1956	The Black Panther	Sabu the Jungle Boy	Short
1957	Sabu and the Magic Ring	Sabu the Jungle Boy	
1960	Mistress of the World	Dr. Lin-Chor	
1963	Rampage	Talib	
1964	A Tiger Walks	Ram Singh	Posthumously release
