= Frontier Gal =

1945 film by Charles Lamont

- Theatrical release poster
- Directed by: Charles Lamont
- Screenplay by: Michael Fessier; Ernest Pagano
- Produced by: Howard Benedict
- Starring: Yvonne De Carlo; Rod Cameron
- Cinematography: Charles P. Boyle; George Robinson
- Edited by: Ray Snyder
- Music by: Frank Skinner (score); Songs by Edgar Fairchild (music) and Jack Brooks (lyricist)
- Production company: Fessier Pagano Productions
- Distributed by: Universal Pictures
- Release dates: December 14, 1945 (New York City); December 21, 1945 (United States)
- Running time: 85 minutes
- Country: United States
- Language: English

Frontier Gal is a 1945 American Western film directed by Charles Lamont and starring Yvonne De Carlo and Rod Cameron.

== Plot ==
Johnny Hart heads for Red Gulch, looking for the mystery man who murdered his partner. He quickly meets Lorena Dumont, a beautiful barkeep who is loved by Blackie, a jealous crook who doesn't like her interest in Johnny one bit.

After he resists her seduction by saying he has another girl back home, Johnny is forced to wed an angry Lorena at gunpoint. She then turns him over to the sheriff after learning that Johnny is a wanted fugitive with a price on his head. He escapes, spends a night of passion with Lorena, then is recaptured by the law.

Six years in prison later, Johnny returns to Red Gulch seeking revenge. He now knows Blackie's the one who killed his partner. Johnny's former girlfriend is summoned to meet him, but it turns out he fathered a child with Lorena who's now five years old. Blackie takes the little girl hostage, but Johnny kills him and reunites a grateful Lorena with their little girl.

== Cast ==
- Yvonne De Carlo as Lorena Dumont
- Rod Cameron as Johnny Hart
- Sheldon Leonard as Blackie
- Beverly Simmons as Mary Ann (as Beverly Sue Simmons)
- Andy Devine as Big Ben
- Fuzzy Knight as Fuzzy
- Andrew Tombes as Judge Prescott
- Clara Blandick as Abigail
- Jan Wiley as Sheila Winthop
- Frank Lackteen as Cherokee
- Jack Overman as Buffalo

== Production ==
The film was to have starred Maria Montez and Rod Cameron. In April 1945 Montez refused to play the role.

She was replaced by Yvonne De Carlo who had just played her first leading role in Salome, Where She Danced. De Carlo says Montez turned down the role because she did not want to work with Rod Cameron and did not want to play the mother of a young girl. De Carlo later wrote "the studio knew I would play opposite Rin Tin Tin if they told me to, and would gladly agree to be the mother of the seven dwarfs."

Filming started in April.

The main villain role was meant to be played by Peter Coe. He had just received a medical discharge for the Marine Corps, and Universal became worried he was not up to it, so the role was given to Alan Curtis. Then Curtis refused to play the role and he was replaced by Sheldon Leonard.

== See also ==
- List of American films of 1945
