= Arabian Nights (1942 film) =

1942 film

- Theatrical release poster
- Directed by: John Rawlins
- Written by: Michael Hogan (story and screenplay); True Boardman (additional dialogue)
- Produced by: Walter Wanger
- Starring: Jon Hall; Maria Montez; Sabu; Leif Erikson; Billy Gilbert; Edgar Barrier; Shemp Howard; Thomas Gomez; Turhan Bey; Elyse Knox; Acquanetta; Carmen D'Antonio
- Cinematography: Milton Krasner, A.S.C. (director of photography); William V. Skall, A.S.C. W. Howard Greene, A.S.C. (associates)
- Edited by: Philip Cahn
- Music by: Frank Skinner
- Color process: Technicolor
- Production company: Walter Wanger presents
- Distributed by: Universal Pictures Company, Inc.
- Release date: December 25, 1942 (US)
- Running time: 87 minutes
- Country: United States
- Language: English
- Budget: $904,765
- Box office: $3,453,416

Arabian Nights is a 1942 American adventure film in Technicolor, directed by John Rawlins and starring Jon Hall, Maria Montez and Sabu. The film is derived from The Book of One Thousand and One Nights but owes more to the imagination of Universal Pictures than the original Arabian stories. Unlike The Thief of Bagdad (1940) and other films in the genre, it features no monsters or supernatural elements.

The film is one of series of "exotic" tales released by Universal Pictures during World War II. Others include Cobra Woman, Ali Baba and the Forty Thieves and White Savage. This is the first feature film that Universal made using the three-strip Technicolor film process, although producer Walter Wanger had worked on two earlier Technicolor films for other studios: The Trail of the Lonesome Pine (1936) at Paramount and the 1937 Walter Wanger's Vogues of 1938 for United Artists.

== Plot ==
In ancient Persia, the young women of a royal harem read the story of Sherazade, unfolding the film's story. Sherazade, a dancer in a wandering circus, captures the attention of Kamar, the brother of the caliph, Haroun al-Rashid. Kamar's infatuation influences his attempts to seize the throne from Haroun and make Sherazade his queen. His revolt fails, and he is sentenced to slow death by exposure, but Kamar's men storm the palace and free their leader. Wounded and forced to flee, Haroun chances upon Sherazade's circus and is spotted by the young acrobat Ali Ben Ali. Aware of Haroun's identity, Ali hides him in the circus. Later, upon awakening from his injuries, Haroun beholds Sherazade and falls in love with her.

Meanwhile, Kamar assumes the throne, but Sherazade is not to be found. He orders the captain of his guard to find her, but a scheming grand vizier, Nadan, approaches the captain with the order to make Sherazade 'disappear.' After finding them, the captain sells the troupe into slavery. When the captain is found out, Nadan murders him in order to conceal his treachery. Haroun, Sherazade, and the acrobats escape the slave pens, but are found by Kamar's army and taken to a tent city in the desert. Kamar reunites with Sherazade and proposes, but she has fallen in love with Haroun instead. Nadan, recognizing the caliph, uses this knowledge to blackmail Sherazade into helping him remove Kamar from the throne, in return for safe conduct for Haroun out of the caliphate. In secret, however, he plans to have Haroun killed once he has crossed the border.

Upon learning of this insidious scheme, Ali and his fellow performers rescue Haroun, who then decides to free Sherazade with the help of the acrobats. But Haroun and the others are quickly captured, and Sherazade finally learns his true identity. Kamar engages Haroun in a sword fight, while the acrobats set fire to the tents; and the arrival of the caliph's loyal troops, summoned by Ali, triggers a massive battle. In the end, as Kamar prepares to deliver the deathstroke to Haroun, Nadan assassinates Kamar. But as he prepares to do in Haroun, Ahmad and Ali interfere, forcing him to flee. Nadan is stopped by a thrown spear and dies inside a burning tent, leaving Haroun, Sherazade, and their loyal friends to celebrate victory.

== Cast ==
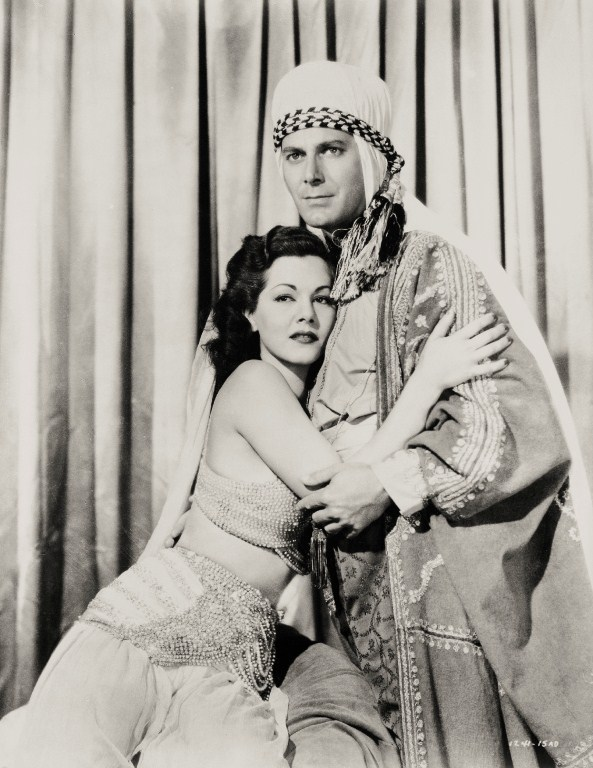
Maria Montez as Sherazade and Jon Hall as Haroun-Al-Rashid, publicity photograph for the film.

- Jon Hall as Haroun-Al-Raschid
- Maria Montez as Sherazade
- Sabu as Ali Ben Ali
- Leif Erikson – Kamar
- Billy Gilbert – Ahmad
- Edgar Barrier – Nadan
- Richard Lane – Corporal
- Turhan Bey – Captain
- John Qualen – Aladdin
- Shemp Howard – Sinbad
- William "Wee Willie" Davis – Valda
- Thomas Gomez – Hakim
- Jeni Le Gon – Dresser
- Robert Greig – Eunuch
- Charles Coleman – Eunuch
- Adia Kuznetzoff – Slaver
- Emory Parnell – Harem Sentry
- Harry Cording – Blacksmith
- Robin Raymond – Slave Girl
- Carmen D'Antonio – Harem Girl

Uncredited (in order of appearance)
Suzanne Ridgeway	harem girl
Amzie Strickland	harem girl
Linda Brent	harem girl
Jean Trent	harem girl
Rebel Randall	harem girl
Murdock MacQuarrie	bidder
Frank Lackteen	bidder
Robert Barron	bidder
André Charlot	bidder
Ernest Whitman	Nubian slave
Acquanetta	Ishya
Lane Chandler	majordomo
Eva Puig	old woman
Kermit Maynard	guard
Eloise Hardt	virgin
Ken Christy	provost marshal
Mickey Simpson	hangman
Duke York	archer
Elyse Knox	slave girl

== Production ==
Walter Wanger had just joined Universal for whom he had made Eagle Squadron. Looking for a follow-up he noted the box office success of The Thief of Bagdad which starred Sabu, who was under contract to Universal. The studio announced they would make the film on 24 March 1942. Montez, Hall and Sabu were always meant to star.

John Rawlins was assigned to direct and filming started in June. Even before filming began Universal announced the trio of leads would appear in a follow-up Cobra Woman. Shortly after that the studio said they would appear in another film White Savage.

The movie was the first shot in color on the Universal lot in 12 years.

Parts of the film were shot in the Coral Pink Sand Dunes State Park in Utah.

== Reception ==
Bosley Crowther of The New York Times panned Arabian Nights, complaining that it "bears just about as much resemblance to the body of stories generally known by that name as a pulpwood fiction resembles Hans Christian Andersen's fairy tales ... It is not the story of Sinbad, the fabulous sailor, nor of Aladdin and his lamp, nor does it contain a Magic Carpet nor even a Flying Horse. It is just a conventional fiction, dressed up in flashy costumes..." Variety liked the film better, calling it "a colorful and actionful entertainment in tune with present audience requirements ... script and direction keep things moving at consistently fast clip, with dialog crisp throughout." Harrison's Reports called it "an exciting, fast-moving extravaganza" though "hampered by a weak story." Film Daily wrote: "The film captures with tremendous success all the riotous color and excitement of Araby of the story books ... [Wanger] must have spent a fortune in costumes and sets and has dressed the whole production in a show of color that has never been equalled on the screen." David Lardner of The New Yorker called the film "muddled" and suggested that Hollywood had been experiencing difficulty finding new roles for Sabu ever since Elephant Boy.

=== Box office ===
The film was a commercial success and earned a profit of $1,851,921. It earned rentals of $1.7 million in 1943. In the UK it earned £164,198.

It was one of the most popular films in France in 1946 with admissions of 4,498,985.

== Awards ==
Arabian Nights was nominated for four Academy Awards: Best Score, Best Cinematography, Best Sound Recording (Bernard B. Brown) and Best Art Direction (Alexander Golitzen, Jack Otterson, Russell A. Gausman and Ira S. Webb).
