= Cobra Woman =

1944 film by Robert Siodmak

- Theatrical release poster
- Directed by: Robert Siodmak
- Screenplay by: Gene Lewis; Richard Brooks
- Story by: W. Scott Darling
- Produced by: George Waggner
- Starring: Maria Montez; Jon Hall; Sabu; Edgar Barrier; Lois Collier; Mary Nash; Lon Chaney
- Cinematography: George Robinson, A.S.C. W. Howard Greene, A.S.C.
- Edited by: Charles Maynard
- Music by: Edward Ward
- Production company: Universal Pictures Company, Inc.
- Distributed by: Universal Pictures
- Release date: May 12, 1944
- Running time: 71 minutes
- Country: United States
- Language: English

Cobra Woman is a 1944 American South Seas adventure film from Universal Pictures, directed by Robert Siodmak that stars Maria Montez, Jon Hall and Sabu. Shot in Technicolor, this film is typical of Montez's career at Universal, and, although mostly forgotten in the 21st century by the general public, is venerated by film buffs as a camp classic for its legendary phallic snake-dance and Montez's character Naja's exaggerated accent when speaking the line: "Give me that Cobra jewel".

Avant-garde filmmaker Kenneth Anger has called it his favorite film. Leonard Maltin's Movie Guide gives the film three stars out of four and calls it a camp classic.

== Plot ==
The beautiful Tollea is abducted and taken to Cobra Island, where she discovers that the Queen is her grandmother. The queen's servant Hava warns Ramu, who expected to marry Tollea, not to go after her, but he sets sail for the forbidden island, with his young friend Kado accompanying him as a stowaway.

A panther attacks Ramu, who is saved by a dart from Kado's deadly blowgun. They continue the search for Tollea, unaware that the high priestess of the island is Naja, her twin sister. The queen has ordered Tollea to be forcibly returned to Cobra Island only so she can displace her evil sister.

Mistaking her for Tollea, Ramu becomes involved with Naja, who falls in love with him. Kado is captured and tortured by Naja's brutal chief minister Martok, but refuses to reveal Ramu's whereabouts. Martok proceeds to murder the Queen.

When they finally meet, Naja attempts to kill her sister with a spear, but plunges to her own death instead. The evil Martok insists that Tollea perform a forbidden cobra dance, whereupon the island's volcano begins to violently erupt. It ceases when Martok is killed by Hava. When Ramu is about to return home, Tollea asks him to remain by her side and help her rule Cobra Island.

== Cast ==
- Maria Montez as Tollea/Naja
- Jon Hall as Ramu
- Sabu as Kado
- Edgar Barrier as Martok
- Mary Nash as Queen
- Lois Collier as Veeda
- Samuel S. Hinds as Father Paul
- Moroni Olsen as MacDonald
- Lon Chaney as Hava

Uncredited (in order of appearance)
| George Magrill | guard |
| Eddie Parker | guard |
| Dale Van Sickel | guard |
| Vivian Austin | handmaiden |
| Fritz Leiber | Venreau |
| Belle Mitchell | native woman |
| John Bagni | native |
| Carmen D'Antonio | dancer |
| Charles Soldani | priest |

== Production ==
Trailer for Cobra Woman

Universal announced the film in June 1942 starring Maria Montez, Jon Hall and Sabu, even before shooting had begun on their production of Arabian Nights. It was meant to follow that film but was pre-empted by White Savage. Filming took place in May 1943.

Robert Siodmak later called the film "silly but fun...Montez couldn't act from here to there but she was a great personality and completely believed in her roles: if she was playing a princess you had to treat her like one all through lunch but if she was a slave girl you could kick her around anyhow and she wouldn't object: Method Acting before its time you might say."

== Critical reception ==
A contemporary review of the film by Bosley Crowther in The New York Times reported that "the submissive audience is witchingly rocked to sleep with as wacky an adventure fable as was ever dished up outside the comic strips." He also wrote that Cobra Island "is ruled by a viperous doll who snake-dances in the sacred temple, surrounded by a bevy of night-gowned toots," that "Miss Montez plays dual roles — those of the good twin and the bad twin — without a trace of distinction between," and that the film "is better than the funny papers, on which it was obviously based." Writing in AllMovie, critic Hans Wollstein described the film as "the quintessential romantic Montez-John Hall melodrama," "Hollywood escapism at its zenith," and "a rather choice slice of cinematic ham." A description of the film at Turner Classic Movies notes that "the absurdity of the plot of Cobra Woman was a source of creative inspiration for such diverse individuals as actor, director and playwright Charles Ludlam of the Ridiculous Theatrical Company and novelist Gore Vidal.

== In popular culture ==
Universal's theatrical release poster can be seen in the 2013 film Mama.

== See also ==
- List of American films of 1944
