= White Savage =

1943 film by Arthur Lubin

- Realart rerelease film poster
- Directed by: Arthur Lubin
- Screenplay by: Richard Brooks
- Story by: Peter Milne
- Produced by: George Waggner
- Starring: Maria Montez; Jon Hall; Sabu; Turhan Bey; Sidney Toler; Thomas Gomez; Don Terry; Paul Guilfoyle
- Cinematography: William E. Snyder; Lester White
- Edited by: Russell F. Schoengarth
- Music by: Frank Skinner
- Production company: Universal Pictures
- Distributed by: Universal Pictures
- Release date: April 23, 1943 (United States)
- Running time: 76 minutes
- Country: United States
- Language: English
- Box office: $1.4 million (US rentals)

White Savage is a 1943 American Technicolor South Seas adventure film directed by Arthur Lubin and starring Maria Montez, Jon Hall and Sabu. The film was re-released by Realart in 1948 on a double-feature with the same three stars in Cobra Woman (1944) and again in 1953, under the title White Savage Woman. It was choreographed by Lester Horton.

== Plot ==
Princess Tahia is the ruler of the tropical Temple Island. Sam Miller schemes to marry her and get hold of the gold bars lining the submerged floor of the island's temple (about which the innocent islanders remain blissfully unconcerned). Heroic shark hunter Kaloe wins the day and the heart of Tahia.

== Cast ==
- Maria Montez as Princess Tahia
- Jon Hall as Kaloe
- Sabu as Orano
- Thomas Gomez as Sam Miller
- Sidney Toler as Wong
- Paul Guilfoyle as Erik
- Turhan Bey as Tamara
- Don Terry as Chris
- Constance Purdy as Blossom
- Al Kikume as Guard
- Frederic Brunn as Sully
- Anthony Warde as Clerk

== Production ==
White Savage had been the original title for Maria Montez's first starring vehicle, South of Tahiti (1941). Arabian Nights was so popular that Universal commissioned two follow-up movies to star Montez, Jon Hall and Sabu: White Savage and Cobra Woman. Gene Lewis wrote the original script for White Savage. Montez's costumes in some scenes were considered to be too skimpy, requiring those scenes to be cut.

== Reception ==
Diabolique said "Not as well known as Montez's later camp classic Cobra Woman (1944) (to be fair, all her American films are camp classics), White Savage is actually a better movie – Montez and Hall seem to genuinely like each other (not always the case in their films), Richard Brooks’ script is clever and there's plenty of action and gorgeous photography."
