= Turhan Bey =

Austrian actor (1922–2012)

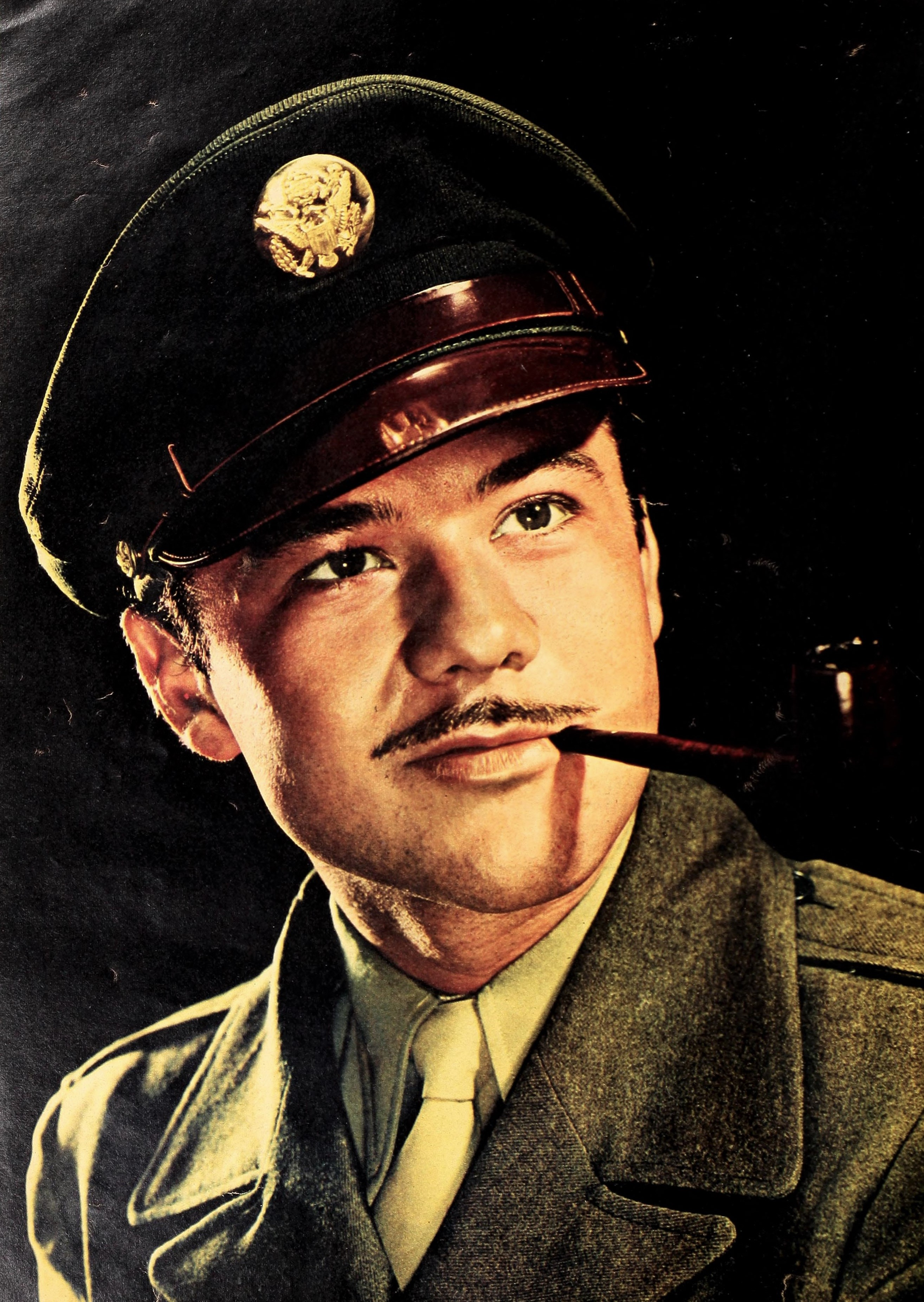
- Bey in 1946
- Born: Turhan Gilbert Selahattin Şahultavi; 30 March 1922; Vienna, Austria
- Died: 30 September 2012 (aged 90); Vienna, Austria
- Occupation: Actor
- Years active: 1941–1953; 1990–1998

Turhan Bey (born Turhan Gilbert Selahattin Şahultavi, 30 March 1922 – 30 September 2012) was an Austrian-born actor of Turkish and Czech-Jewish origins. Active in Hollywood from 1941 to 1953, he was dubbed "The Turkish Delight" by his fans. After his return to Austria, he pursued careers as a photographer and stage director. Returning to Hollywood after a 40-year hiatus, he made several guest appearances in 1990s television series including SeaQuest DSV, Murder, She Wrote and Babylon 5 as well as a number of films. After retiring, he appeared in a number of documentaries, including a German-language documentary on his life.

== Life and career ==
Bey was born Turhan Gilbert Selahattin Şahultavi in Vienna, Austria, on 30 March 1922, as the son of Turhan Bey, a Turkish diplomat, and Irma Meyer, a Czech-Jewish woman.

After the Anschluss annexing Austria to Nazi Germany and his parents' divorce, he and his mother immigrated to the United States in October 1938, initially settling in New Hampshire. In 1939, they moved to Los Angeles.

=== Acting ===
Bey was an acting student at Ben Bard's School of Dramatic Art and was active in the Pasadena Playhouse.

When he enrolled in classes to improve his English, he was asked to play a role in a teacher's play.

Bey says it was Bard who helped come up with his stage name. He said, "He knew that 'Bey' was a term of respect in Turkey so said 'Why don't we just make it Turhan Bey?'"

In December 1939, he appeared in Bard's Talent Scout Revue on stage. "Vivid playing and several fine characterizations distinguished the evening", reported the Los Angeles Times.

A talent scout from Warner Brothers was in the audience, was impressed and signed him to a contract, under the name of Turhan Bey.

=== Warner Bros ===
Bey appeared in a number of films in small roles, usually playing someone sinister: Shadows on the Stairs (1941), and Footsteps in the Dark (1941) with Errol Flynn. Warners then dropped him.

=== Universal ===
Bey moved to Universal, where he had small roles in Raiders of the Desert (1941) (which had an early appearance from Maria Montez), and Burma Convoy (1941).

He went to RKO to appear in The Gay Falcon (1941), the first in The Falcon series of B movies. He returned to Universal for a small role in Bombay Clipper (1942), starring Montez and directed by John Rawlins.

Bey had a slightly bigger part in Unseen Enemy (1942), directed by Rawlins, playing a Japanese spy. He was in the serial Junior G-Men of the Air (1942). Bey was in Drums of the Congo (1942), then went back to RKO for The Falcon Takes Over (1942), an adaptation of Farewell My Lovely.

Bey played a South Sea islander in Danger in the Pacific (1942) and a Japanese officer in Destination Unknown (1942). He had a role as an Egyptian follower of Kharis in The Mummy's Tomb (1942) with Lon Chaney Jr. which he later said was his favorite film.

Bey's first "A" movie in color was Arabian Nights (1942) with Maria Montez, Jon Hall and Sabu directed by Rawlins; Bey had a support role as a captain. The movie was a huge success and led to a series of exotic adventure stories starring Montez. Bey was noticed too, with one reviewer's calling him "a handsome snake in the grass."

Bey was in The Adventures of Smilin' Jack (1942), then had his best chance to date with White Savage (1943). This was a follow-up to Arabian Nights, reuniting Montez, Hall and Sabu; Bey was cast in the role of Montez's wastrel brother. Arthur Lubin directed and the movie was a hit.

Warner Bros borrowed Bey to play a small role in Background to Danger (1943), a George Raft movie set in Turkey.

=== Stardom ===
Bey was receiving a lot of fan mail, and Universal began to build him into a star. Hedda Hopper called him a "Turkish Valentino."

He was top billed in the horror film The Mad Ghoul (1943), with Evelyn Ankers.

When Sabu enlisted in the army, Bey took his place in Ali Baba and the Forty Thieves (1944), a Technicolor spectacular with Montez and Hall directed by Lubin. Bey was top billed, and the film was very popular. Bey had a cameo in Universal's all-star Follow the Boys (1944).

Bey was meant to be reunited with Montez and Hall in Gypsy Wildcat (1944) when MGM borrowed him to play a Chinese man in Dragon Seed (1944) starring Katharine Hepburn and Walter Huston. His part in Wildcat went to Peter Coe.

Dragon Seed earned over $4 million but lost money due to its high cost. Bey said the experience of working at MGM was "very exciting" although he "almost preferred the way Universal worked, because it was faster and less time consuming."

Back at Universal, Bey was the romantic male lead in the big-budget The Climax (1944) with Boris Karloff and Susanna Foster, an unsuccessful attempt to duplicate the success of Phantom of the Opera (1943). He had a key role in the musical Bowery to Broadway (1944), a vehicle for Jack Oakie.

In 1944, a poll by exhibitors of "Stars of Tomorrow" listed Bey at number nine.

In May 1944, Universal announced it would star him in Return of the Sheik.

Universal put Bey and Foster in the Western Frisco Sal (1945). He was more comfortably cast in Sudan (1945), with Montez and Hall.

MGM wanted Bey for a part in Weekend at the Waldorf, but Universal and Walter Wanger wanted him for another film so he could not do it (George Zucco played the role). The Wanger film was Night in Paradise (1946), with Bey playing Aesop opposite Merle Oberon for director Arthur Lubin. Bey admitted to often arriving late on set, something he later regretted. Arthur Lubin claimed that by this time "he was very conceited, he was very sure of himself, he was getting very difficult to direct." The movie was a box-office flop and damaged Bey's standing in Hollywood.

=== Army service ===
As a Turkish subject, Bey had not been eligible to be called by the draft board. That changed when Turkey declared war on Germany in February 1945, and in June, Bey was inducted into the army at Fort MacArthur.

He served at Santa Ana Army Air Base for a time and performed in The Loves of Carmen at Camp Roberts in 1944.

Bey was in the army for 18 months, which halted his career's momentum.

When he got out, Universal offered him a film that Bey refused, and he was put on suspension. It sold his contract, which had three years to go, to Eagle-Lion.

Bey later recalled his time at Universal as "very pleasant, very constructive; the end, unfortunately, a big flop but c'est la vie...It was a studio of cooperation where the biggest producer was never too big to listen to you...I should have been a little more serious about my work but I was very young." Lubin said Bey leaving Universal was "too bad because that boy had a fabulous photogenic personality."

=== Eagle-Lion Productions ===
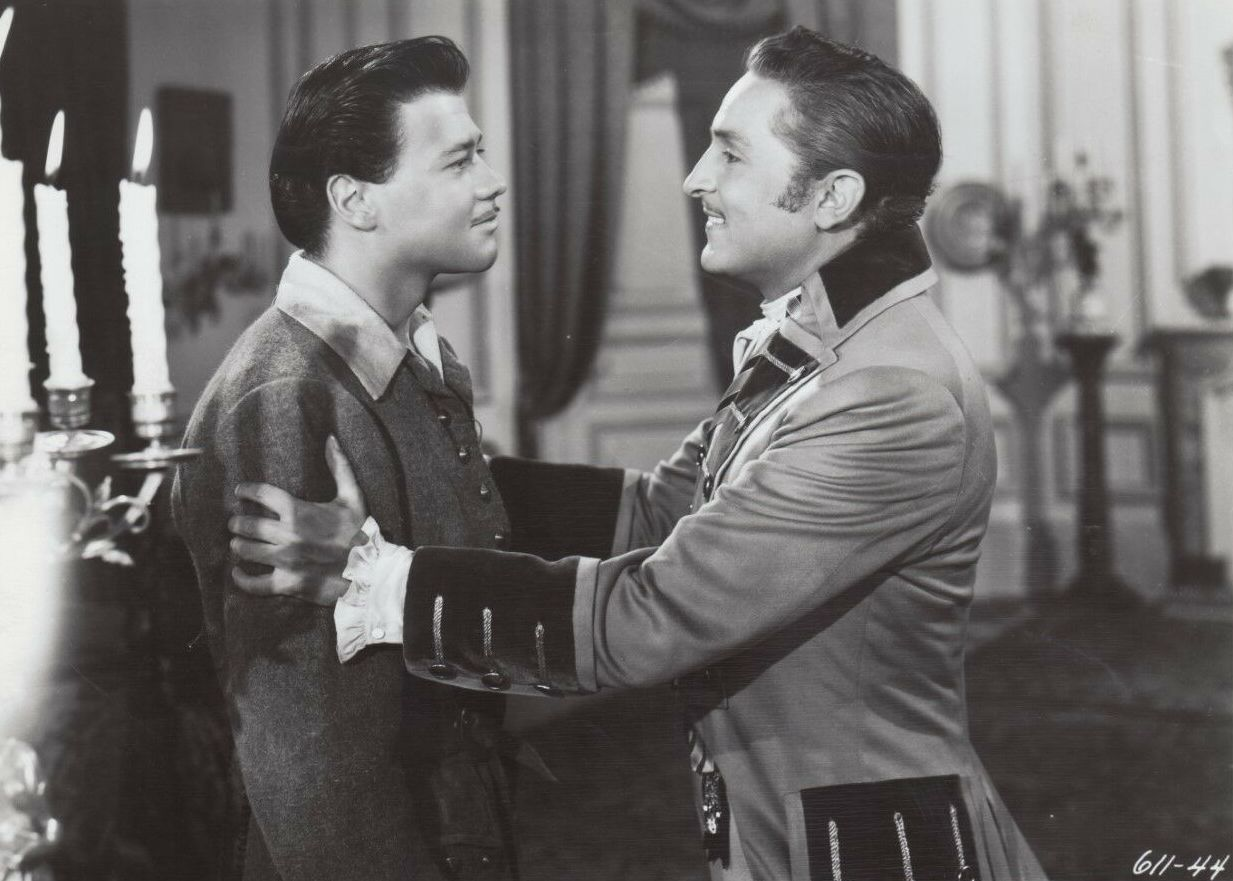
Bey with Arturo de Córdova in Adventures of Casanova (1948)

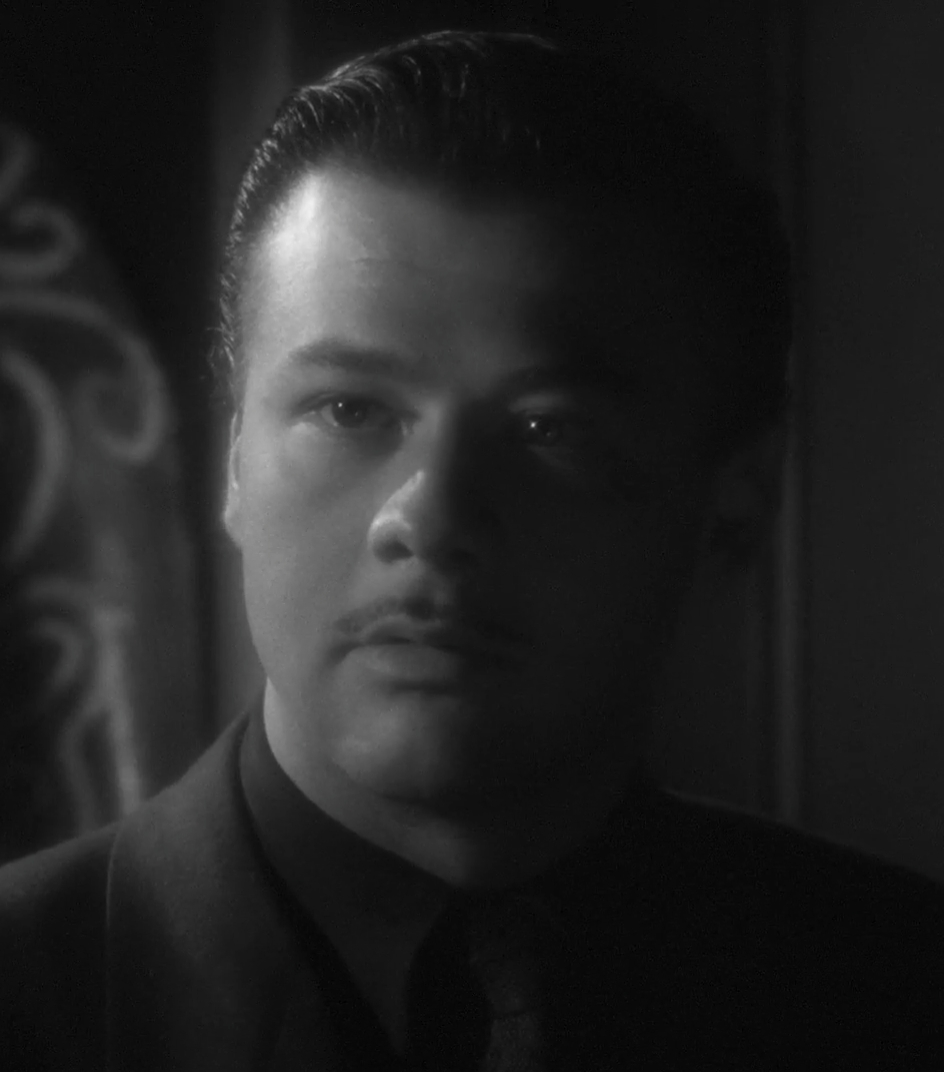
Bey in The Amazing Mr. X (1948)

Bey made four films with Eagle-Lion. The first was the comedy Out of the Blue (1947) with George Brent and Virginia Mayo. Bey followed it with the swashbuckler Adventures of Casanova (1948), supporting Arturo de Córdova. Bey made the thriller The Amazing Mr. X (1948) with Lynn Bari. His fourth film for Eagle-Lion was Parole, Inc (1948) with Michael O'Shea.

In August 1948, he appeared on stage in The Second Man in Princeton.

=== Final films as star ===
Bey made Song of India (1949) at Columbia with Sabu and Gail Russell. The film was not a success.

He bought an interest in a cafe in Palm Springs. The same year, he tried to get financing for a film on Sir Edward Coke, A Lion Under the Throne.

In Austria he produced, but did not star in, Stolen Identity (1953).

He returned to Hollywood and was cast in Sam Katzman's Prisoners of the Casbah (1953), billed after Gloria Grahame and Cesar Romero. He announced he had set up his own production company, Metropolitan Pictures, and wanted to produce but not star in Dikov, a film about a boy and his bird.

=== Return to Hollywood ===
Turhan returned to the United States in the early 1990s. He appeared in episodes of SeaQuest 2032, Murder, She Wrote, VR.5, and The Visitor. He also guest-starred in two episodes of the TV series Babylon 5: first as the emperor of the Centauri Republic (who also had the name Turhan), and later as a Minbari Ranger named Turval.

Bey was in the Fred Olen Ray thriller Possessed by the Night (1994), the drama Healer (1994), The Skateboard Kid 2 (1995), and Grid Runners (1995).

The documentary Vom Glück verfolgt. Wien – Hollywood – Retour, made in 2002 by Andrea Eckert, was about him.

Another documentary in which he appeared was film historian Scott MacQueen's Extra Bonus, filmed in 2000.

== Personal life ==
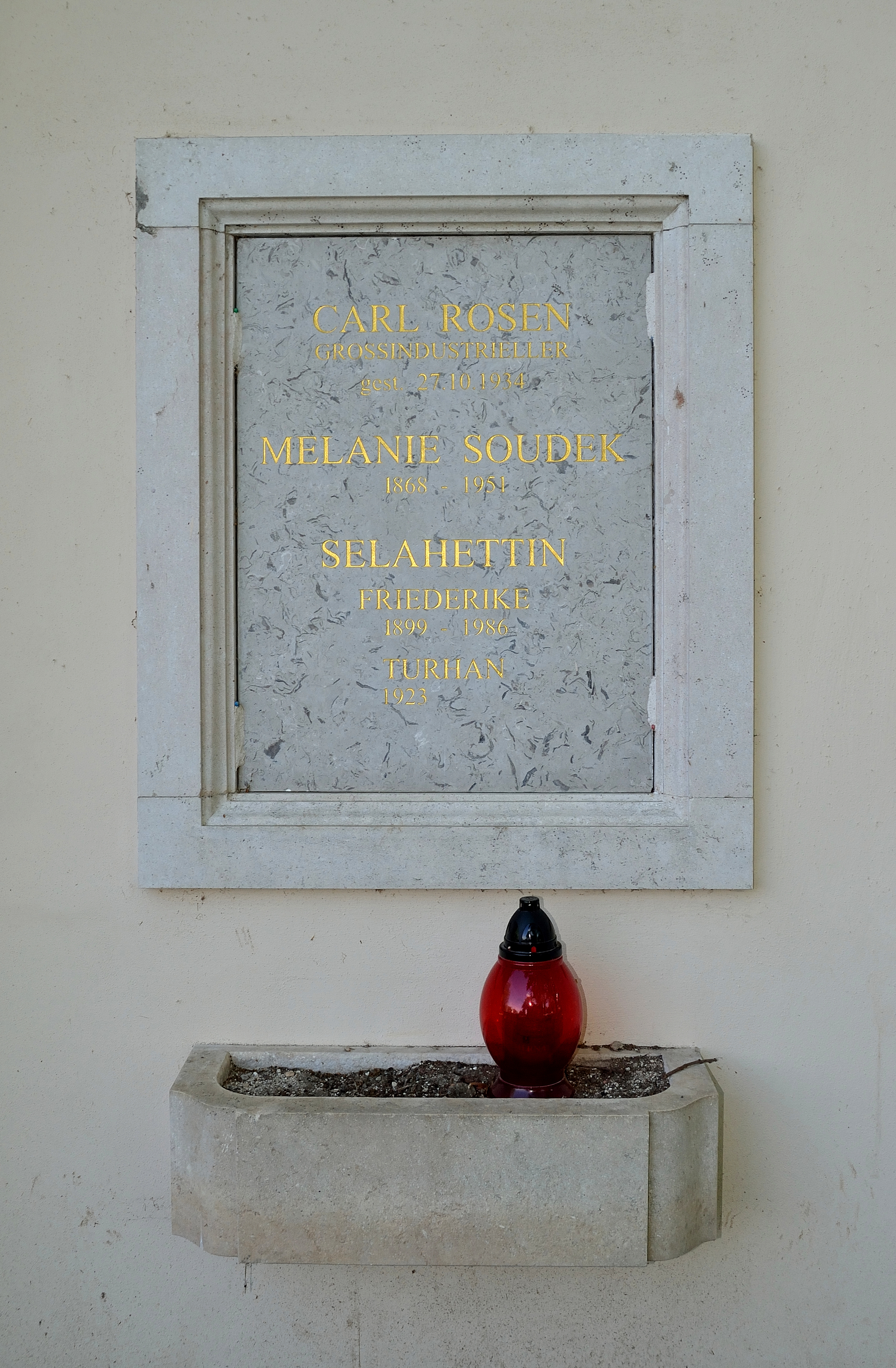
Feuerhalle Simmering, grave of Turhan Bey and his mother Friederike

Bey was romantically linked with Lana Turner at one time. In September 1944, he had a brawl over Turner with the latter's ex-husband Stephen Crane. His relationship with Turner ended when he went into the army.

=== Death ===
Turhan died on 30 September 2012 from Parkinson's disease. He was cremated at Feuerhalle Simmering, where his ashes are buried next to his mother's.

== In popular culture ==
In the 1948 Warner Brothers "Merrie Melodies" cartoon, "A-lad-in-His Lamp", a map of the Bagdad area appears. On the map, there is a geographic feature called "Turhan Bay".

Turhan Bey's long absence from Hollywood was referenced in the first part of the 1969 Get Smart episode "To Sire, with Love". Maxwell Smart claims that after appearing in an unspecified movie involving mummies, Bey was cursed, and his career never recovered.

In a 1980 episode of Alice titled "Dog Day Evening", Vera uses Turhan Bey's name in a rhyming game.

In a season three episode of M*A*S*H, titled "Bombed," Henry Blake, after losing the first good toothbrush he's received in six months, laments that he had teeth like Turhan Bey while using it.

In the Hogan's Heroes episode "The Battle Of Stalag 13" (1966, Season 2, Episode 5), Hogan enlists Klink's secretary Hilda's help in signaling for Plan X; telling her "part of which includes a free autographed photo of Turhan Bey".

== Filmography ==
Actor
Year	Film	Role	Notes
1941	Shadows on the Stairs	Ram Singh	
1941	Footsteps in the Dark	Ahmed	
1941	Raiders of the Desert	Hassen Mohammed	
1941	Burma Convoy	Mr. Yuchau	
1941	The Gay Falcon	Manuel Retana	
1941	Bombay Clipper	Captain Chundra	
1942	Unseen Enemy	Ito	
1942	Junior G-Men of the Air	Henchman Araka	
1942	The Falcon Takes Over	Jules Amthor	Uncredited
1942	Danger in the Pacific	Tagani	
1942	Drums of the Congo	Juma	
1942	Destination Unknown	Captain Muto	
1942	The Mummy's Tomb	Mehemet Bey	
1942	Arabian Nights	Captain of the Guard	
1943	The Adventures of Smilin' Jack	Kageyama	Serial film
1943	White Savage	Tamara	
1943	Captive Wild Woman	End Narrator	Voice, Uncredited
1943	Background to Danger	Hassan	
1943	Crazy House	Turhan Bey	Uncredited
1943	The Mad Ghoul	Eric Iverson	
1944	Ali Baba and the Forty Thieves	Jamiel	
1944	Dragon Seed	Lao Er Tan – Middle Son	
1944	The Climax	Franz Munzer	
1944	Bowery to Broadway	Ted Barrie	
1945	Frisco Sal	Dude Forante	
1945	Sudan	Herua	
1946	Night in Paradise	Aesop	
1947	Out of the Blue	David Gelleo	
1948	Adventures of Casanova	Lorenzo	
1948	The Amazing Mr. X	Alexis	
1948	Parole, Inc.	Barney Rodescu	
1949	Song of India	Gopal	
1953	Prisoners of the Casbah	Ahmed	
1993	SeaQuest DSV	Dimitri Rossovich	TV series (one episode: "Treasure of the Mind")
1994	Possessed by the Night	Calvin	
1994	Healer	Igor Vostovich	
1995	Murder, She Wrote	Sherif Faris	TV series (one episode: "Death 'N Denial")
1995	VR.5	Abernathy	TV series (one episode: "Reunion")
1995	Grid Runners	Dr. Cameron	
1995–1998	Babylon 5	Centauri Emperor Turhan / Turval	2 episodes
1997	The Visitor		TV series (one episode: "The Black Box")
2000	The Skateboard Kid II	Zeno	
2002	Vom Glück verfolgt. Wien – Hollywood – Retour	Himself	TV documentary

Producer
Year	Film	Notes
1953	Stolen Identity	Producer

== Bibliography ==
- Feramisco, Thomas M.; Koster, Peggy Moran (2008), The Mummy Unwrapped: Scenes Left on Universal's Cutting Room Floor, McFarland, ISBN 978-0-7864-3734-4.
- Garrett, Eddie (2005), I Saw Stars in the 40s and 50s, Trafford Publishing, ISBN 1-4120-5838-4.
- Lamparski, R. (1980) Jane Russell Presents Whatever Became Of, Bantam Premium: New York.
- Weaver, Tom (2003). Double Feature Creature Attack: A Monster Merger of Two More Volumes of Classic Interviews. McFarland. ISBN 9780786482153.
