= Night in Paradise (1946 film) =

1946 film by Arthur Lubin

- Theatrical release poster
- Directed by: Arthur Lubin
- Screenplay by: Ernest Pascal
- Based on: Peacock's Feather by George S. Hellman
- Produced by: Walter Wanger
- Starring: Merle Oberon; Turhan Bey
- Cinematography: W. Howard Greene; Hal Mohr
- Edited by: Milton Carruth
- Music by: Frank Skinner
- Color process: Technicolor
- Production company: Walter Wanger Productions
- Distributed by: Universal Pictures
- Release date: May 3, 1946
- Running time: 84 minutes
- Country: United States
- Language: English
- Budget: $1,602,641
- Box office: $2,032,486

Night in Paradise is a 1946 American fantasy comedy film directed by Arthur Lubin and starring Merle Oberon and Turhan Bey. It was produced by Walter Wanger for distribution by Universal Pictures.

In 560 BC King Croesus of Lydia incurs the wrath of the sorceress Queen Attossa he had promised to marry, when he chooses the beautiful Delarai of Persia instead. Attossa, in disembodied form, mocks Croesus nearly to the point of madness, so he seeks a solution from the fortune-teller Aesop, who is very young and handsome, but believes that people only receive wisdom with age, arrived from the Isle of Samos in disguise of an old man with a hunch, a limp, and a cane. But Aesop also has eyes for Delarai.

This expensive, lavish Technicolor production of plaster Grecian temples and painted skies was Wanger's second attempt to film the novel, and ended up costing $1.6 million and losing Universal some $800,000. One source describes it as a kitschy "Maria Montez vehicle without Maria Montez".

== Plot ==
In 560 BC King Croesus of Lydia incurs the wrath of the sorceress Queen Attossa he had promised to marry, when he chooses the beautiful Delarai of Persia instead. Attossa, in disembodied form, mocks Croesus nearly to the point of madness, so he seeks a solution from the fortune-teller Aesop, who is very young and handsome, but believes that people only receive wisdom with age, arrived from the Isle of Samos in disguise of an old man with a hunch, a limp, and a cane. But Aesop also has eyes for Delarai.

One day, Delarai invites Aesop to interpret a charm. As he does, he goes as his young self but with a different name, Jason. Delarai doesn't know at first, but as she sees the same scar on Jason's hand as Aesop's hand, she knows, and reveals that a hunch and a limp may be faked, but a scar remains a scar, and they fall in love with each other, but Atossa and the people in the palace suspect something is going on with Aesop and Delarai.

Croesus wanted the Oracle to tell him the truth and sends Aesop to retrieve it. As Aesop is packing, Delarai talks him out of it but fails. Aesop goes anyway, and Delarai cries herself to sleep. Aesop does go fetch it from a priest, but the priest refuses, saying his life is valuable. Aesop claims that if a priest's words do not mean anything, then his life means less and strangles him. He takes the priest's clothes and hides his face in the hood.

Delarai comes to the temple, wanting to seek for Aesop, but before she could say anything, Aesop reveals his young face slightly, and Delarai breaks out a smile. As the security guards see her smile, they unmask Aesop, and Aesop and Delarai run hand in hand. They are forced to jump off a cliff. They jump in each other arms, and Attosa reveals her image at sea, saying that Aesop and Delarai actually survived because of their faith, their love, and a little help from Attosa.

They live in a small cottage with a lake and a garden. Delarai is mending and Aesop's hand around on her shoulder, 12 boys come out saying "daddy!" which reveals that they got married and have children. "Another fable to bed?" asks the eldest son. Aesop replies "not tonight, tonight is mommy's night." Delarai and Aesop smile and they have a family hug.

== Cast ==
- Merle Oberon as Delarai
- Turhan Bey as Aesop
- Thomas Gomez as King Croesus
- Gale Sondergaard as Attosa
- Ray Collins as Leonides
- Ernest Truex as Scribe
- George Dolenz as Frigid Ambassador
- John Litel as Archon
- Jerome Cowan as Scribe
- Douglass Dumbrille as High Priest
- Paul Cavanagh as Cleomenes
- Marvin Miller as Scribe
- Moroni Olsen as High Priest
- Richard Bailey as Lieutenant
- William 'Wee Willie' Davis as Salabaar
- Unbilled players include Julie London
- Unbilled singer Juli Lynne Charlot (opening title song)
- Eula Morgan as Townswoman (unbilled)

== Production ==
The film was based on a novel by George S. Hellman, Peacock's Feather, which was published in 1931. In 1934 Hellman announced he had dramatised his own novel. The same year Walter Wanger announced he would make a film based on the novel as the third movie for his newly formed Walter Wanger Productions, after The President Vanishes and Private Worlds. It was to star Ann Harding. However the film was not made.

The project was reactivated in 1944 with Universal agreeing to make it with Wagner. The stars were to be Turhan Bey and Louise Abritten with Arthur Lubin to direct. In December 1944 Hedda Hopper reported that the film would star Maria Montez and that Wagner wanted Claude Rains for a key role. However, by January 1945 Merle Oberon had the lead.

Arthur Lubin claims the studio "was very much against making" the film and tried to get him to persuade Wanger not to make it. He also says that Bey "was very conceited, he was very sure of himself and was getting very difficult to direct" and that during filming "he was carrying on several love affairs with other stars who annoyed Miss Oberon... very, very much." Lubin says one day during filing "he got very, very difficult. He tore off his wig and said that he did not want anything more to do with me, he wouldn't be directed by me." This ended the relationship between Lubin and Bey and the two men ever saw each other again.

== Reception ==
=== Critical ===
Diabolique magazine later wrote "This is painful to watch, one of Lubin's worst movies; those Maria Montez-Jon Hall films were full of movement and pace but Paradise is basically a lot of hanging around a palace, relying on its two leads to provide star power they simply didn’t have. In a year where 90 million Americans went to the movies once a week, the film managed to lose $800,000 and killed Bey's career as a leading man."

Lubin said Bey "was very badly cast. In fact it was a bad script. It was a horrible picture, the only good thing about it was the sets... even Merle Oberon was terrible." However Lubin sais "I enjoyed sitting there looking at these huge sets and all these beautiful naked and semi naked girls and swimming pools and seeing hundreds of men on platforms photographing the damn picture."

=== Box office ===
The film recorded a loss of $790,711.
