= Pillow Talk =

1959 American romantic comedy film by Michael Gordon

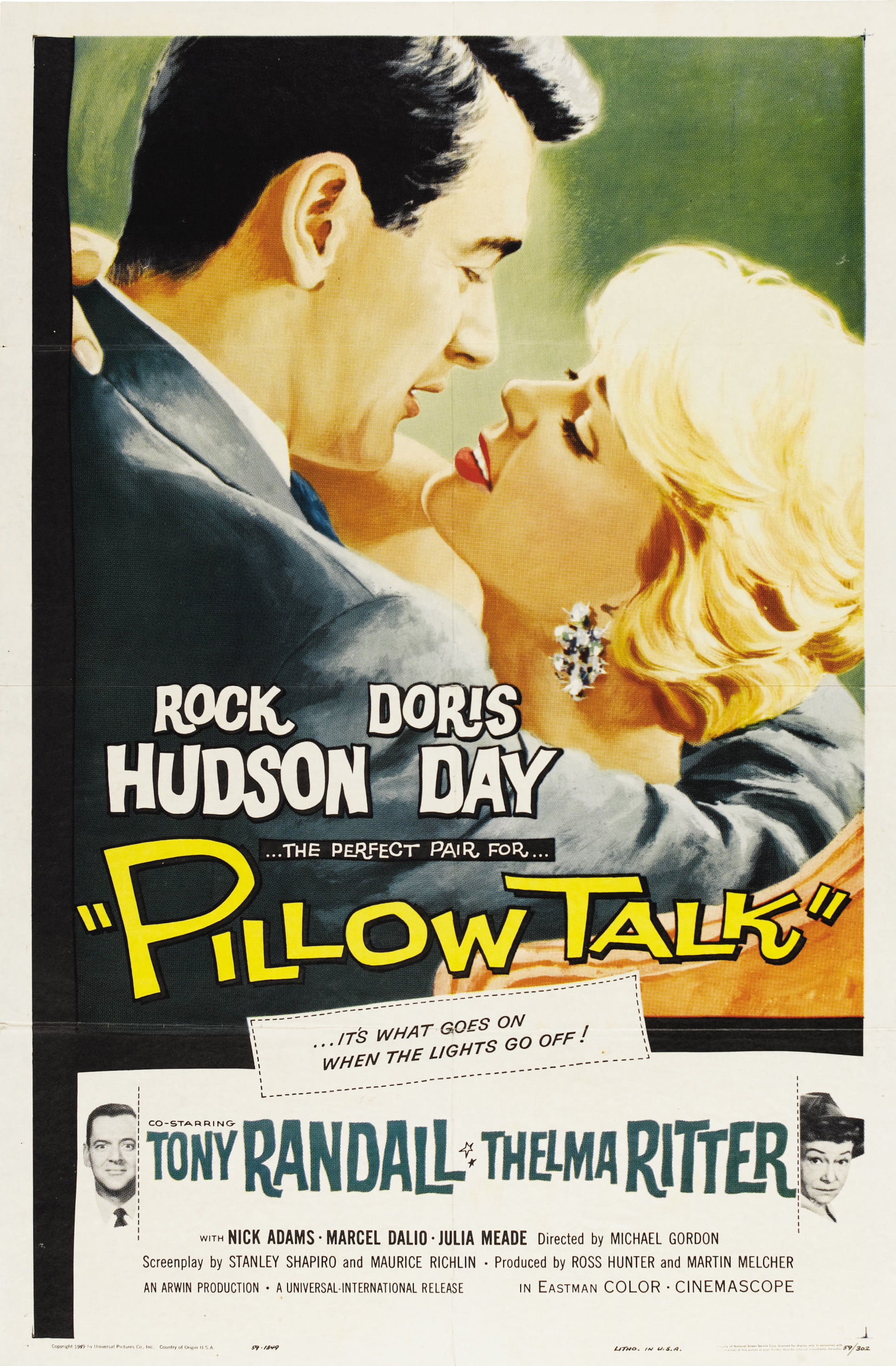
- Theatrical release poster
- Directed by: Michael Gordon
- Screenplay by: Stanley Shapiro; Maurice Richlin
- Story by: Russell Rouse; Clarence Greene
- Produced by: Ross Hunter; Martin Melcher
- Starring: Rock Hudson; Doris Day; Tony Randall; Thelma Ritter
- Cinematography: Arthur E. Arling
- Edited by: Milton Carruth
- Music by: Frank De Vol
- Color process: Eastmancolor
- Production companies: Arwin Productions; Avernus Productions
- Distributed by: Universal Pictures
- Release date: October 6, 1959 (New York)
- Running time: 102 minutes
- Country: United States
- Language: English
- Budget: $1.6 million
- Box office: $7.6 million (US and Canada rentals) $18,750,000 (Domestic)

Pillow Talk is a 1959 American romantic comedy film in CinemaScope directed by Michael Gordon and starring Rock Hudson and Doris Day. The supporting cast features Tony Randall, Thelma Ritter, Nick Adams, Allen Jenkins, Marcel Dalio and Lee Patrick. The film was written by Russell Rouse, Maurice Richlin, Stanley Shapiro, and Clarence Greene.

It tells the story of Jan Morrow (Day), an interior decorator, and Brad Allen (Hudson), a womanizing composer and bachelor, who share a telephone party line. When she unsuccessfully files a complaint against him for constantly using the line to woo his conquests, Brad finds out she is pretty and decides to trick her by masquerading as a Texas rancher. The scheme seems to work until their mutual friend Jonathan Forbes (Randall) finds out about it and exposes Brad.

According to a "Rambling Reporter" (August 28, 1959) item in The Hollywood Reporter, RKO originally bought the script, by Russell Rouse and Clarence Greene, in 1942 but, because it was not produced, the writers bought it back in 1945. In 1947, they sold it as a play, but bought it back once again four years later, finally selling it in 1958 to Arwin Productions, the company owned by Doris Day's husband, Martin Melcher. Although the film was originally titled Pillow Talk, according to a February 2, 1959 "Rambling Reporter" item in The Hollywood Reporter, the title "displeased" the PCA, and was changed to Any Way the Wind Blows. In August 1959, however, the original title was reinstated.

The film won the Academy Award for Best Original Screenplay, and was nominated for Best Actress in a Leading Role (Doris Day), Best Actress in a Supporting Role (Thelma Ritter), Best Art Direction-Set Decoration, Color (Richard H. Riedel, Russell A. Gausman, Ruby R. Levitt) and Best Music, Scoring of a Dramatic or Comedy Picture.

It the first of three romantic comedies in which Day, Hudson and Randall starred together, the other two being Lover Come Back (1961) and Send Me No Flowers (1964).

Upon its release, Pillow Talk brought in a then staggering domestic box-office gross of $18,750,000 and marked a comeback in Rock Hudson's career, after the failure of A Farewell to Arms two years earlier.

On July 14, 1980, Jack Martin reported that Pillow Talk was the "biggest hit of 1959".

In 2009, it was selected for preservation in the National Film Registry by the Library of Congress for being "culturally, historically or aesthetically significant".

== Plot ==
Jan Morrow is an interior decorator in New York City. She lives alone and claims to be happy when questioned on that subject by her drunken housekeeper, Alma. The only irritant in her life is the party line that she shares with Brad Allen, a Broadway composer and playboy who lives in a nearby apartment building. She cannot obtain a private phone line for her business, which she runs from home, because the telephone company has been overwhelmed by recent demand for new phone lines.

Jan and Brad, who have only ever "met" on the telephone, develop a feud over the use of the party line. Brad constantly uses the phone to chat with one young woman after another, singing to each of them an "original" love song supposedly written just for her, though he only changes the name or language he sings in. Jan needs the line for work and tries to make him more considerate. Brad suggests that the single Jan is jealous of his popularity and has a problem in 'the bedroom department'. He charms the telephone inspector who is sent to investigate Jan's complaint. Later, Brad and Jan agree to share the phone line on alternate half hours.

One of Jan's clients is millionaire Jonathan Forbes, who repeatedly asks her to marry him. She refuses. Unknown to Jan, Jonathan is also Brad's old college buddy and his current Broadway benefactor. Jonathan makes Brad aware of his latest love interest and Brad realises this must be his feuding partner. He is intrigued.

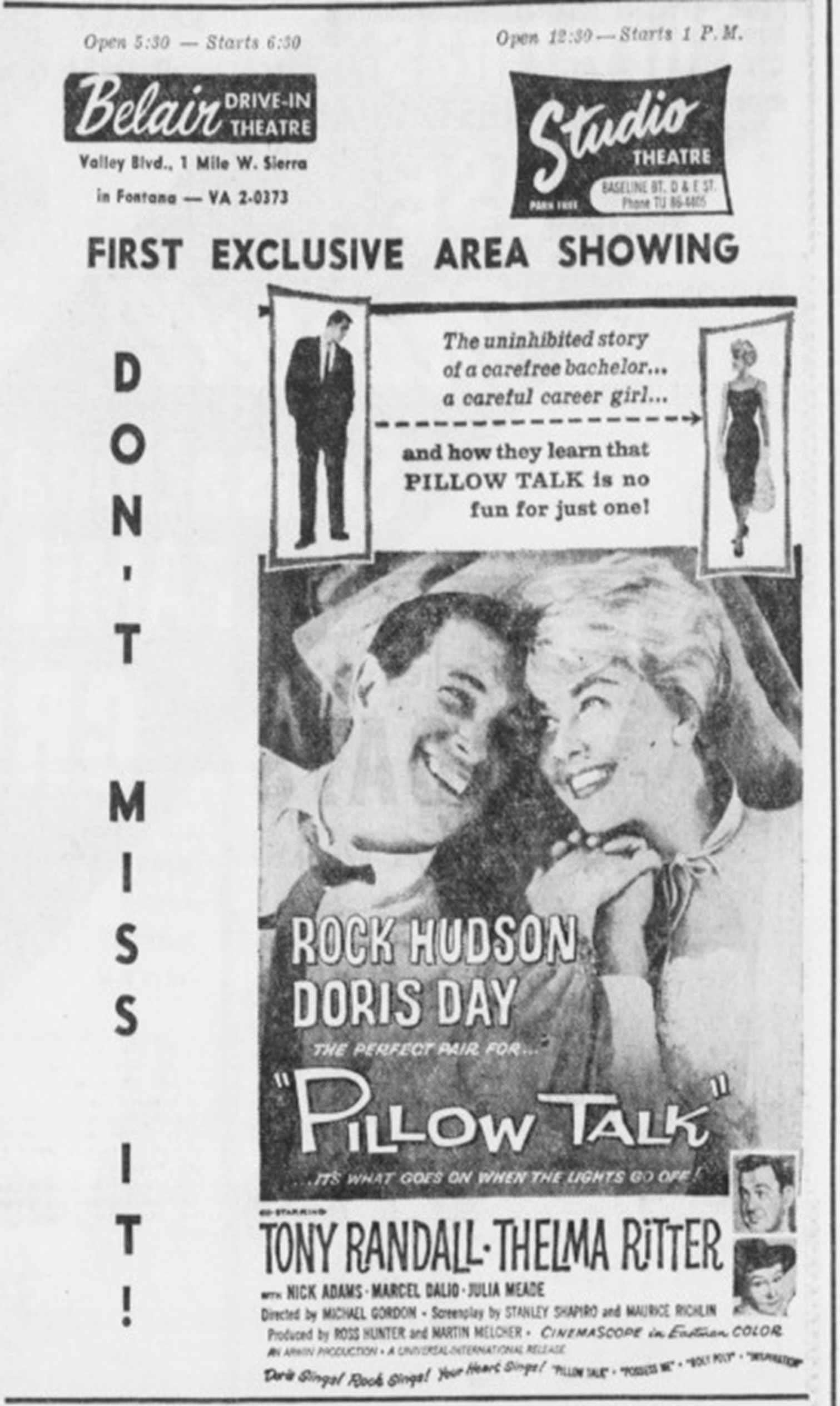
Advertisement from 1959

One evening in a nightclub, Brad sees Jan dancing and learns who she is. Attracted to her, he fakes an accent and invents a new persona: Rex Stetson, a wealthy Texan rancher. He succeeds in wooing Jan, in part because he has Brad make insinuations that he can then work to Rex's favour. For example, Brad suggests Rex will stop by his hotel room on their date and try to seduce her; when Rex does this but only shows Jan the view, she thinks he is a perfect gentleman. When Jan brags to Brad about this, he suggests Rex may be gay. This leads Jan to question Rex about his attraction to her, thereby allowing him to kiss her.

Jonathan uses a private eye to find out who Jan is dating. After discovering the truth about Brad's masquerade, he forces Brad to put Jan in a taxi and send her home. Brad is to leave New York and go to Jonathan's cabin in Connecticut to complete his new songs. However, Brad double crosses him by inviting Jan to join him. Once there, kissing ensues until Rex leaves to fetch logs for the fire and Jan stumbles upon a copy of Rex's sheet music. She plunks the melody on the nearby piano and recognizes Brad's 'inspiration' song. She confronts Brad and asks to be taken home by Jonathan, who has just arrived at the cabin.

In New York, Jonathan is less in love with Jan because she cries so much over Brad. He is pleased to learn that the playboy has fallen in love, while conversely Jan will have nothing to do with Brad. Brad turns to Alma for advice. Alma, pleased to meet Brad after listening in on the party line for so long, suggests he hire Jan to decorate his apartment so they will be forced to collaborate. Jan only concedes so that her employer will not lose the commission. Brad leaves all the design decisions up to Jan, telling her only to design a place that she would want to live in herself.

Still resentful, Jan decorates Brad's apartment in the most gaudy decor she can muster. Horrified by what he finds, Brad storms into Jan's apartment and carries her in her pajamas through the street back to his apartment to explain herself. Brad mentions all the changes he has made to end his bachelor lifestyle because he thought they were getting married. Her face lights up and, as he leaves in anger, she uses one of his "playboy" remote control switches to lock the door. She flips another switch and the player piano pounds out a honky-tonk version of Brad's standard love song. He turns around, their eyes meet, and they embrace.

Some time later, Brad goes to tell Jonathan that he is going to be a father, only to be pulled by Dr. Maxwell (an obstetrician) and Nurse Resnick into their office for an examination, when he says that he is going to have a baby.

== Cast ==
- Rock Hudson as Brad Allen
- Doris Day as Jan Morrow
- Tony Randall as Jonathan Forbes
- Thelma Ritter as Alma
- Nick Adams as Tony Walters
- Julia Meade as Marie
- Allen Jenkins as Harry
- Marcel Dalio as Mr. Pierot
- Lee Patrick as Mrs. Walters
- Mary McCarty as Nurse Resnick
- Alex Gerry as Dr. Maxwell
- Hayden Rorke as Mr. Conrad
- Valerie Allen as Eileen
- Jacqueline Beer as Yvette
- Arlen Stuart as Tilda
- Perry Blackwell as Perry
- Karen Norris as Miss Dickenson

== Production ==
=== Development ===
The film's script was turned down and bought back by RKO a few times in the late 1940s and early 1950s until Martin Melcher (the husband of Doris Day at the time) and his Arwin Productions label bought the script and took it to Universal. According to Day in A.E. Hotchner's biography Doris Day: Her Own Story, the film was titled Pillow Talk, but the title displeased the Production Code Administration (PCA). Melcher tried to get co-producer Ross Hunter to change the name to Any Way the Wind Blows, the name of a song he was about to publish, but Hunter stuck with the original name. The original ending planned for the film was to have Jan, after using the trick switch to lock the door and then smiling at Brad, shut off the light and say "All apartments look alike in the dark." This open-ending was changed in the final film to show that Jan and Brad got married and are now expecting a baby.

Director Michael Gordon had been blacklisted and was working on Broadway. He said producer Ross Hunter saw The Tender Trap on Broadway which Gordon had directed and "he felt that the play exhibited the general temper and spirit that he wanted" for Pillow Talk. Gordon recalled he was known "as that intellectual, intense Jew out of the Group Theater, and I wasn't associated with comedies. But I've always like comedy and relished working in comedy." Gordon said "I was very happy to be gainfully employed in Hollywood again, although I must honestly say that deep in my heart I had some misgivings about the rampant chauvinism of Pillow Talk. But it was fun to do, and I enjoyed working with Doris Day very much."

=== Casting ===
The film is noted for reinventing the screen images of Rock Hudson and, particularly, Doris Day. Hunter identified Day's potential to be sexy, and recruited legendary costume designer Jean Louis, who designed 18 or 24 costumes for Day to wear. Hunter said to Day, "You are sexy, Doris, and it's about time you dealt with it...if you allow me to get Jean Louis to do your clothes, I mean a really sensational wardrobe that will show off that wild fanny of yours, and get some wonderful makeup on you, and chic you up and get a great hairdo that lifts you, why, every secretary and every housewife will say, 'Look at that—look what Doris has done to herself. Maybe I can do the same thing'".

Day acknowledged that the film transformed her image from "the girl next door" to classy sex symbol, describing that the plot, for the time, was very sexy, involving a climactic scene in which the leading man carries her out of bed in her pajamas and out into the streets. In addition, Laykin et Cie lent $500,000 worth of jewels for Day to wear.

This is Hudson's first comedy film, after a slew of dramas that he made throughout the 1950s including All That Heaven Allows (1956) and A Farewell to Arms (1957). It was Hunter who saw Hudson's potential to do comedy. The advice he received from director Michael Gordon was "Comedy is the most serious tragedy in the world. Play it that way and you can't go wrong. If you ever think of yourself as funny, you haven't got a chance." On February 2, 1959, Thelma Ritter was cast as Alma, Jan's housekeeper, while Lee Patrick was cast as Mrs. Walters the following month. Hope Emerson was recruited by Hunter to play an Indian princess called "Dessert Flower" in the film. She does not appear in the final cut. A cameo appearance by Day's friend and actress Miriam Nelson occurs in the scene where Brad ducks into Dr. Maxwell's (the obstetrician) office to avoid running into Jan. Nelson was given the walk-on part as a patient in the waiting room so she could have lunch with Day in the commissary.

Gordon said he had "problems" with producer Marty Melcher, who was Day's husband and manager, "because he could not understand why I said that Doris was not going to have a number to sing. She sang in the picture, but informally. I said, 'She's an interior decorator in this film, not a singer. Doris herself was willing to go along with that."

=== Filming ===
According to Hudson, the final scene, in which Brad storms into Jan's apartment and yanks her out of bed, and carries her through the streets of Manhattan, back to his re-decorated apartment, was actually shot first. Due to back problems, Hudson carried Day on a shelf with her sheets and blankets over her to get through the many takes. According to Hudson, "I could have managed if only one take had been involved, but we went on endlessly, primarily because there was a bit actor who played a cop on the street, and as we passed him Doris' line was 'Officer, arrest this man,' and the cop was supposed to say to me, 'How you doing, Brad?' but that stupid actor kept calling me Rock (01:39:36). So back to our marks we went for another take and another and another. I'll bet we did that scene twenty times. That's why the shelf for Doris to sit on." Also, Hudson related that when he pulled Doris Day out of bed, he forgot to let go of her ankles "…with the result that my leading lady crashed to the floor."

Day and Hudson developed chemistry during filming and the cast and crew acted as if they were family. Hudson recalled that, as per a Modern Screen article, "they had to add a week on to the shooting schedule because we could not stop laughing". Day clarified this during interviews she had with Merv Griffin on The Merv Griffin Show and Johnny Carson on The Tonight Show (1976), during her 1976 press tour to promote her biography Doris Day: Her Own Story by A.E. Hotchner. "Every day on the set was a picnic—sometimes too much of a picnic, in that we took turns at breaking each other up." According to an article in the October 1959 issue of Saturday Review, Jean Louis designed 24 costumes for Doris Day and Laykin et Cie loaned the production $500,000 worth of jewels. The film is notable for its usage of split-screens during which Jan and Brad/Rex have telephone conversations. Triple split-screens are featured at the beginning of the film when Brad is using the party line to flirt with Eileen and Yvette.

== Songs ==
Day sings three songs in the film: "Pillow Talk" during the opening credits, "Roly Poly" in the piano bar with Blackwell and Hudson, and "Possess Me" on the drive up to Jonathan's cabin. Singer Perry Blackwell performs three songs in the piano bar: "I Need No Atmosphere", "Roly Poly" (in part), and "You Lied"—a song directed at Hudson's character, Brad. Hudson sings "Inspiration" in the film to three of his conquests: Eileen, Yvette and Marie. It then becomes an instrumental motif to represent Brad and his playboy ways: when the telephone inspector comes to interview Brad (00:13:24), when Brad calls Jan to apologize for his behavior and ask her on a date (00:26:26) and when Jan realizes that "Rex" was Brad the whole time after discovering the sheet music of the song and playing its notes on the piano in Jonathan's home during their stay in Connecticut (01:17:54). For their commercial releases, Doris Day recorded the title song for Columbia Records and Rock Hudson recorded "Roly Poly" and the title song for Decca Records.

== Release ==
=== Promotions ===
Universal's efforts to promote the film were significant. The studio sponsored press tours by the cast, director and producers in cities across the United States throughout the late summer and early fall of 1959. Promotional materials included original production photos and press material (a copy of which is available at the New York Public Library for Performing Arts at Lincoln Center), print advertisements and recordings sent to radio stations with Day and Hudson narrating introductions to audio clips from the film. Also, Hudson recorded a voice message that would play when people called a number given by K-B's Ontario Theatre in local newspaper and magazine ads for the film. Even though the number was only expected to receive about 60,000 calls daily, it was so successful it wound up receiving twice that many, or 120,000 calls a day. The posters for the film differed in content in the United States and international markets. In the United States, the posters were clean and non-explicit, with no trace of the film's verbal and visual innuendo. Consistent with the European Foreign-Language films being introduced in the states, the ads running in Europe were more explicit. For example, the Danish release poster features an illustration of Doris Day in the bathtub from a high-angle, showing the water inside and giving a sexy appearance.

=== Premieres ===
Producer Ross Hunter convinced Sol Schwartz, owner of the Palace Theatre on Broadway, to book Pillow Talk for a two-week run following its premiere on October 6, 1959. Cast members Hudson and Day attended the event with celebrities, including Gloria Swanson and Tallulah Bankhead. A second premiere also took place at the same time at the re-opened Murray Hill Theatre on 34th Street as a way to benefit the United Nations International School, where Tony Randall was present. An international premiere at the Egyptian Theatre in Hollywood also took place on October 13, with Hudson, Day, Esther Williams and Jeff Chandler in attendance.

=== Box office ===
The film was a box office hit, grossing $18,750,000 domestically. It was number one at the U.S. box office for seven consecutive weeks. This made Hunter's vision of pairing Day and Hudson together so successful, that they earned Allied's "male and female star of the year" awards for 1959.

=== Critical reception ===
The film received mostly positive reviews from critics upon its release. Bosley Crowther of The New York Times wrote "A nice, old-fashioned device of the theatre, the telephone party line, serves as a quaint convenience to bring together Rock Hudson and Doris Day in what must be cheerfully acknowledged one of the most lively and up-to-date comedy-romances of the year." Variety described the film as "dripping with the trappings of glamor. The premise is dubious, but an attractive cast, headed by Rock Hudson and Doris Day, give the good lines the strength to overcome this deficiency. It plays." Harrison's Reports agreed, writing: "Although the basic premise of the plot is slightly incredulous, and the plot itself wafer thin, the entire production is endowed with superb production values that more than compensate for the script deficiencies." Paul V. Beckley of the New York Herald Tribune wrote, "Pillow Talk is a melange of legs, pillows, slips, gowns and decor and is about as light as it could get without floating away, but it has a smart, glossy texture and that part of the population likely to be entranced at the sight of a well groomed Rock Hudson being irresistible to a silver-haired Doris Day will probably enjoy it." John McCarten of The New Yorker was dismissive, calling the film "an attempt at farce that is hardly what I would call farcical." The Monthly Film Bulletin wrote that director Michael Gordon "maintains a lively pace and handles his players with an expert feeling for timing and emphasis. Doris Day gives possibly her best comedy performance to date; Tony Randall works several more variations on his tired dilettante act; and Rock Hudson's beefcake charmer has all the necessary physical ingredients for success."

The film holds a 94% rating on Rotten Tomatoes, based on 31 reviews, with an average rating of 7.2/10. Metacritic, which uses a weighted average, assigned the film a score of 73 out of 100, based on 10 critics, indicating "generally favorable" reviews.

== Accolades ==
Award	Category	Nominee(s)	Result	Ref.
Academy Awards	Best Actress	Doris Day	Nominated	
Academy Awards	Best Supporting Actress	Thelma Ritter	Nominated	
Academy Awards	Best Original Screenplay	Story by Russell Rouse and Clarence Greene; Screenplay by Stanley Shapiro and Maurice Richlin	Won	
Academy Awards	Best Art Direction – Color	Art Direction: Richard H. Riedel; Set Decoration: Russell A. Gausman and Ruby R. Levitt	Nominated	
Academy Awards	Best Scoring of a Dramatic or Comedy Picture	Frank De Vol	Nominated	
Bambi Awards	Best Actor – International	Rock Hudson	Won	
Bambi Awards	Best Actress – International	Doris Day	Nominated	
Golden Globe Awards	Best Motion Picture – Musical or Comedy		Nominated	
Golden Globe Awards	Best Actress in a Motion Picture – Musical or Comedy	Doris Day	Nominated	
Golden Globe Awards	Best Supporting Actor – Motion Picture	Tony Randall	Nominated	
Laurel Awards	Top Comedy		Won	
Laurel Awards	Top Male Comedy Performance	Rock Hudson	Nominated	
Laurel Awards	Top Female Comedy Performance	Doris Day	Won	
Laurel Awards	Top Female Supporting Performance	Thelma Ritter	Nominated	
National Film Preservation Board	National Film Registry		Inducted	
Photoplay Awards	Gold Medal		Won	
Writers Guild of America Awards	Best Written American Comedy	Stanley Shapiro and Maurice Richlin	Nominated	

=== Honors ===
- 1959: The New York Times 10 Best Films of 1959
- 2002: AFI's 100 Years...100 Passions – #99

== Unproduced sequel ==
In 1960, Baby Talk, a sequel starring Hudson and Day, was announced. In 1980, a sequel was planned for the film, set 20 years after the original film ended. The story involved Jan and Brad having their first daughter (who would have been played by Kristy McNichol), and getting a divorce, which allows Jonathan (who would have been played again by Tony Randall) to have another chance of proposing to Jan. She schemes to get Brad back while Brad does a scam of his own. According to David Kaufman's biography Doris Day: The Untold Story of the Girl Next Door, Day was enthusiastic about the project and wanted to be involved. Hudson also expressed interest in returning. Ross Hunter was set to produce again, with Delbert Mann (who directed Day and Hudson in Lover Come Back) directing the script written by Bruce Kane. Despite making changes according to Day's wishes and getting approval from Universal to make the sequel, the project did not materialize; Day's retirement was one of the reasons.

== See also ==
- List of American films of 1959
- Down with Love, an homage 2003 film that contains elements of Pillow Talk (with Tony Randall himself making a cameo)
