= Any Way the Wind Blows =

Any Way the Wind Blows may refer to:

- Any Way the Wind Blows (film), a 2003 film by dEUS' singer-songwriter-director Tom Barman
- Any Way the Wind Blows, a 2002 novel by E. Lynn Harris
- Any Way the Wind Blows, a 2021 novel by Rainbow Rowell

== Music ==
- Any Way the Wind Blows, the fourth volume in the officially released Zappa bootleg box set Beat the Boots
- Anyway the Wind Blows: The Anthology, a 1997 compilation album by J. J. Cale
- Anyway the Wind Blows, 1995 album by Brother Phelps

=== Songs ===
- "Any Way the Wind Blows" (1958 song), a 1958 song most notably sung by Doris Day
- "Any Way the Wind Blows" (Southern Pacific song), 1989
- "Any Way the Wind Blows", a song by Anaïs Mitchell from the musical Hadestown
- "Any Way the Wind Blows", a song by the Mothers of Invention from Freak Out!, 1966
- "Any Way the Wind Blows", a song by Sara Bareilles from Little Voice, 2007
- "Any Way the Wind Blows", theme song to the popular Tropical Heat series sung by Fred and Larry Mollin
- "Anyway the Wind Blows", a song by J. J. Cale from Okie, 1974
- "Anyway the Wind Blows", a song by Syl Johnson from Back for a Taste of Your Love, 1973

== See also ==
- "Bohemian Rhapsody", a 1975 song by Queen
