= Top Man =

Top Man may refer to:

- Top Man (film), 1943 American film
- Topman, stand-alone fashion business
- Top Man, a character in Mega Man 3
- "Top Man", a song by Blur from their 1995 album The Great Escape
