= Good Morning, Judge (1943 film) =

1943 film by Jean Yarbrough

- Directed by: Jean Yarbrough
- Written by: Warren Wilson; Maurice Geraghty; Winston Miller
- Produced by: Paul Malvern
- Starring: Dennis O'Keefe; Louise Allbritton; Mary Beth Hughes
- Cinematography: John W. Boyle
- Edited by: Edward Curtiss
- Music by: Milton Rosen
- Production company: Universal Pictures
- Distributed by: Universal Pictures
- Release date: May 7, 1943
- Running time: 67 minutes
- Country: United States
- Language: English

Good Morning, Judge is a 1943 American comedy film directed by Jean Yarbrough and starring Dennis O'Keefe, Louise Allbritton and Mary Beth Hughes. When a songwriter is sued for plagiarism, he falls in love with the female lawyer acting against him.

== Cast ==
- Dennis O'Keefe as David Barton
- Louise Allbritton as Elizabeth Christine Smith
- Mary Beth Hughes as Mira Bryon
- J. Carrol Naish as Andre Bouchard
- Louise Beavers as Cleo
- Samuel S. Hinds as J.P. Gordon
- Frank Faylen as Ben Pollard
- Ralph Peters as Harry Pollard
- Oscar O'Shea as Magistrate
- William Forrest as Judge William Foster
- Marie Blake as Nicky Clark
- Don Barclay as Biscuit Face

== Bibliography ==
- Elizabeth Leese. Costume Design in the Movies. Courier Corporation, 1991.
