= Edward Locke =

American dramatist

Edward J. Locke (1869–1945) was an American playwright born in the United Kingdom.

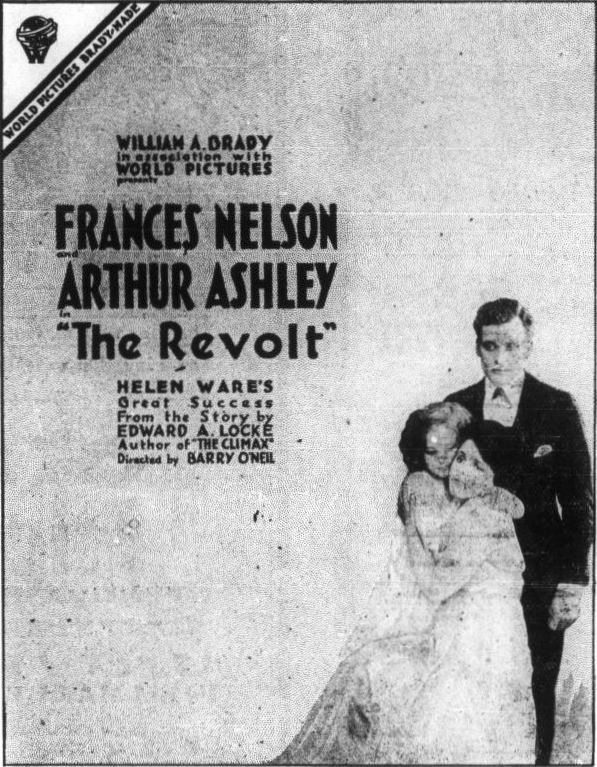
Advertisement for The Revolt

He became a theatre and vaudeville actor while still in his teens. He wrote some vaudeville sketches and plays, the most successful of which was The Climax, which has been filmed twice (the first time in 1930, the second in 1944), though one version bore little resemblance to the play. The Case of Becky was also the subject of a movie. The Revolt (1915) was made into the World Pictures' The Revolt the following year.

== Works ==
- Fighting Fate (1905)
- The Climax (1909)
- The Case of Becky (1912)
- The Silver Wedding (1913)
- The Revolt (1914), featuring child actor Rosana Logan
- The Bubble (1915)
- The Dancer (1919)
- The Woman Who Laughed (1922)
- Mike Angelo (1923)
- The Love Call (1927)
- 57 Bowery (1928)
