= This Is the Life (1944 film) =

1944 film by Felix E. Feist

- Directed by: Felix E. Feist
- Written by: Wanda Tuchock
- Based on: the play Angela Is Twenty-Two by Sinclair Lewis and Fay Wray
- Produced by: Bernard W. Burton
- Starring: Donald O'Connor; Susanna Foster; Peggy Ryan
- Cinematography: Hal Mohr
- Distributed by: Universal Pictures
- Release date: June 2, 1944
- Running time: 87 min.
- Country: United States
- Language: English

This Is the Life is a 1944 American musical romantic comedy film directed by Felix E. Feist starring Donald O'Connor, Susanna Foster, and Peggy Ryan. It is one of the several films that Universal Studios rushed O'Connor and Ryan through before O'Connor was drafted into the Army to serve in World War II.

== Plot ==
On her 18th birthday, orphan Angela Rutherford is given an inheritance of $6000. Her wisecracking friend Jimmy Plum arranges for a professional band to perform a number for her party, "You're a Lollapalooza", sung and danced by Jimmy and the band's Sally McGuire. Afterward, Sally tells Jimmy she likes him, but he is in love with Angela, who in turn is infatuated with Army surgeon Major Hilary Jarret. Angela is certain that Jimmy's father, Dr. Plum, will arrange a deferment so that Jimmy can follow in his footsteps and go to medical school, but Jimmy insists he is going to enlist.

While gazing at a sleeping Hilary, Angela fantasizes that she is serenading him with "Ciri-Biri-Bin". When he wakes up, Angela makes it clear she is attracted to him, causing him to deflect her advances and return to New York City to try to get reinstated into the Army, having recovered from malaria. Angela and her aunt Betsy follow him. She takes singing lessons, showing him what she has learned with a rendition of "L'amour, toujours, l'amour".

After Hilary is declared unfit for active service, Angela wears him down in his depressed state and gets him to agree to an engagement. Jimmy travels to New York and is ready to give up when he finds out, even though Hilary encourages him to fight for Angela.

Jimmy encounters photographer Harriet West and learns she has some connection with Hilary, so he arranges a "chance" reunion at a nightclub. It turns out that Harriet is Hilary's ex-wife. The couple are still attracted to each other, but Harriet remembers their clashes over their careers. Everybody resents Jimmy's schemes and ask him to desist, but he persists. Finally, after Jimmy gets Angela to eavesdrop on a conversation between Hilary and Harriet, she realizes they still love each other. They get back together, while Jimmy enlists in the Army.

== Cast ==
- Donald O'Connor as Jimmy [Plum]
- Susanna Foster as Angela [Rutherford]
- Peggy Ryan as Sally McGuire
- Louise Allbritton as Harriet [West Jarrett]
- Patric Knowles as Hilary Jarret
- Dorothy Peterson as Aunt Betsy
- Jonathan Hale as Doctor Plum
- Eddie Quillan as Gus
- Frank Jenks as Eddie
- Frank Puglia as Music Teacher
- Maurice Marsac as Leon
- Virginia Brissac as Mrs. Tiggett
- Ray Eberle and His Orchestra
- Bobby Brooks Quartette
- unbilled players include Mantan Moreland

== Songs ==
- "You're a Lollapalooza", written by Grace Shannon and Bill Crago, sung and danced by O'Connor and Ryan
- "Ciri-Biri-Bin", written by Alberto Pestalozza, sung by Foster
- "All or Nothing at All", composed by Arthur Altman with lyrics by Jack Lawrence, sung by Ray Eberle
- "At Sundown", sung by Bobby Brooks with the Ray Eberle Orchestra
- "Yippee-I-Voot", written by Buddy Pepper, Inez James and Sidney Miller, sung by Ryan and O'Connor
- "With a Song in My Heart", music by Richard Rodgers, lyrics by Lorenz Hart, sung by Foster
- "Gremlin Walk", written by Inez James and Sidney Miller, sung by Ryan
- "It's the Girl", written by Buddy Pepper and Inez James, sung by O'Connor and Foster
- "Open Thy Heart", written by Georges Bizet, English version by Eugène Oudin, sung by Foster
