= Russell A. Gausman =

Set decorator

- Born: July 4, 1892; St. Louis, Missouri
- Died: May 20, 1963 (aged 70); Los Angeles, California
- Occupation: Set decorator
- Years active: 1925-1960

Russell A. Gausman (July 4, 1892 – May 20, 1963) was an American set decorator. He won two Academy Awards and was nominated for five more in the category Best Art Direction. He worked on nearly 700 films between 1925 and 1960. He was born in St. Louis, Missouri and died in Los Angeles, California.

== Academy Awards ==
Gausman won two Academy Awards for Best Art Direction and was nominated for five more:

Won

- Phantom of the Opera (1943)
- Spartacus (1960)

Nominated

- The Flame of New Orleans (1941)
- Arabian Nights (1942)
- The Spoilers (1942)
- The Climax (1944)
- Pillow Talk (1959)

== Partial filmography ==
- Destry Rides Again (1939)
- The Bank Dick (1940)
- The House of the Seven Gables (1940)
- The Flame of New Orleans (1941)
- Arabian Nights (1942)
- The Spoilers (1942)
- Shadow of a Doubt (1943)
- Phantom of the Opera (1943)
- The Climax (1944)
- The Woman in Green (1945)
- The Exile (1947)
- Brute Force (1947)
- Winchester '73 (1950)
- The Lawless Breed (1952)
- Meet Danny Wilson (1952)
- Bend of the River (1952)
- Has Anybody Seen My Gal? (1952)
- No Room for the Groom (1952)
- East of Sumatra (1953)
- Column South (1953)
- Law and Order (1953)
- Thunder Bay (1953)
- The Golden Blade (1953)
- Tanganyika (1954)
- Playgirl (1954)
- The Veils of Bagdad (1954)
- The Glenn Miller Story (1954)
- Foxfire (1955)
- Man Without a Star (1955)
- The Far Country (1955)
- Smoke Signal (1955)
- The Spoilers (1955)
- Backlash (1956)
- Toy Tiger (1956)
- Showdown at Abilene (1956)
- A Day of Fury (1956)
- Man in the Shadow (1957)
- Night Passage (1957)
- Joe Dakota (1957)
- Away All Boats (1957)
- The Incredible Shrinking Man (1957)
- Day of the Bad Man (1958)
- A Stranger in My Arms (1959)
- Pillow Talk (1959)
- Spartacus (1960)
