= Frisco Sal =

1945 film by George Waggner

- Directed by: George Waggner
- Screenplay by: Curt Siodmak
- Based on: story by Siodmak
- Starring: Susanna Foster
- Production company: Universal Pictures
- Distributed by: Universal Pictures
- Release date: 1945
- Running time: 94 minutes
- Country: United States
- Language: English

Frisco Sal is a 1945 American Western film directed by George Waggner and starring Susanna Foster and Turhan Bey. It was co written by Curt Siodmak.

== Plot ==
Sad tidings have brought Sally, a young woman, from New England to the Barbary Coast. She is trying to find who murdered her brother. Sally is glad to get a job signing at Dude's saloon. Just as she develops feelings for Dude, she begins to wonder if he might be behind her brother's murder.

== Cast ==
- Susanna Foster as Sally
- Turhan Bey as Dude
- Alan Curtis as Rio
- Andy Devine as Bunny
- Thomas Gomez as Dan
- Collette Lyons as Mickey
- Samuel S. Hinds as Doc
- Fuzzy Knight as Hallelujah
- Billy Green as Billy

== Production ==
The film was originally called Frisco Kate and was to star Foster and Ella Raines'.

Filming started in September 1944.
