= George S. Hellman =

American author, editor, and art collector (1878-1958)

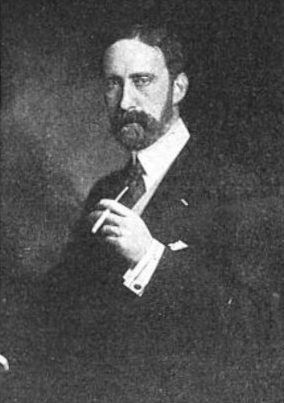
- Born: George Sidney Hellman; November 14, 1878; New York City, US
- Died: July 16, 1958 (aged 79); Monsey, New York, US
- Occupations: Writer, editor, art collector

George Sidney Hellman (November 14, 1878 – July 16, 1958) was an American author, editor, and art collector.

== Biography ==
George S. Hellman was born in New York City on November 14, 1878, the grandson of Joseph Seligman. Hellman assisted J. P. Morgan with the development of his book collection that later became the Morgan Library. In 1909, he helped Morgan acquire the book collection of Stephen H. Wakeman for $165,000, which included an important selection of works by Nathaniel Hawthorne.

Hellman wrote one of the first biographies of Washington Irving in 1925. Scholars were divided on the work's historical merit as the book focused more on Irving's life rather than his literary career. Hellman's approach was criticized as "informal and anecdotal", but the book was also described as "the best biography of Irving that has been written". Hellman became a trustee of the Arts Council of the City of New York in 1927. In 1938 he began work on the first biography of Benjamin Cardozo, though Irving Lehman, Hellman's friend and Cardozo's executor, denied him access to Cardozo's personal papers.

Hellman was also a known as a collector of drawings. Part of his collection, including works by Caravaggio, Carracci, and Fragonard, was shown in 1920 at Anderson Galleries. Hellman's 1927 book Lanes of Memory describes his experiences as an art collector and the development of his collection.

Hellman died in 1958 in Monsey, New York.

== Bibliography ==
- The Hudson and Other Poems. New York: G.P. Putnam, 1909.
- Memoirs of the Comte de Mercy Argenteau. 1917.
- Letters of Henry Brevoort to Washington Irving. 1918.
- Letters of Washington Irving to Henry Brevoort. 1918.
- The True Stevenson: A Study in Clarification. Boston: Little, Brown, 1925.
- Washington Irving, Esquire: Ambassador at Large from the New World to the Old. New York: A.A. Knopf, 1925.
- Lanes of Memory. New York: A.A. Knopf, 1927.
- Peacock's Feather. Indianapolis: Bobbs-Merrill, 1931.
- Benjamin N. Cardozo, American Judge. New York: McGraw-Hill, 1940.
