= The Flame of New Orleans =

1941 film directed by René Clair

- Directed by: René Clair
- Written by: Norman Krasna
- Produced by: René Clair; Joe Pasternak
- Starring: Marlene Dietrich; Bruce Cabot; Roland Young; Mischa Auer
- Cinematography: Rudolph Maté
- Edited by: Frank Gross
- Music by: Frank Skinner
- Production company: Universal Pictures
- Distributed by: Universal Pictures
- Release date: April 6, 1941 (U.S.)
- Running time: 79 minutes
- Country: United States
- Language: English
- Budget: $817,000

The Flame of New Orleans is a 1941 American historical comedy film directed by René Clair and starring Marlene Dietrich and Bruce Cabot in his first comedy role. The supporting cast features Roland Young, Andy Devine and Franklin Pangborn. It was made and distributed by Universal Pictures. It was the last of three films Dietrich made with producer Joe Pasternak who called it "in many ways, our most interesting."

The movie was nominated for an Oscar for Best Art Direction by Martin Obzina, Jack Otterson and Russell A. Gausman.

== Plot ==
The legend of "Claire of New Orleans" is born after two fishermen find a wedding dress floating on the Mississippi River. According to the legend, the Countess Claire Ledux disappeared on her wedding day in 1840, and when the dress was found, the people of New Orleans assumed that the bride had committed suicide by throwing herself in the river. Then the story of Claire Ledux is revealed in the film.

When Claire arrives in New Orleans for the first time she has a strong ambition to become Mrs. Charles Giraud, wife to a rich and renowned banker. She gets her opening one night at the opera, when she manages to get the seat next to the banker. Trying to catch the unsuspecting banker's attention she fakes fainting in her seat. The banker immediately rushes to her rescue and Claire's mission is accomplished. Desperate to see the beautiful Claire again, Charles sends his valet over to Claire's maid Clementine after the opera. The maid forwards the message, asking Claire to meet with Charles in the park. Claire and the maid make a plan to let a man harass Claire in the park, so that Charles can come to her "rescue". But even the simplest plans go wrong, and on the way to the park Claire's carriage runs over a monkey by accident. The monkey belongs to river boat captain Robert Latour. He stops the carriage, but since Clementine believes this is the man they hired to make a fuzz with them, she tells the driver to go on and ignore the man. Robert Latour is aggravated by this behaviour and tips the carriage over.

After this incident, where Charles was not only stood up by Claire since the carriage never arrived, but also deprived of a chance to come to her aid, he swears to avenge Robert Latour's insolent behaviour. He also vows to properly take care of and guard Claire every night from now on.

Attending a Mardi Gras festivity, Claire recognizes Robert Latour in the crowd, and points him out to Charles, who is quick to challenge Robert to a duel. Robert gets to choose weapons, and he chooses knives, something Charles isn't quite prepared for. Robert gets a distinct advantage over Charles in the duel, and Claire steps in to interrupt what she fears will be the end of the banker's life. She tells Charles that she mistook Robert for someone else, thus ending the battle.

To settle the matter once and for all, Robert invites Claire to dinner on his rover boat the following night. He borrows 150 dollars to pay for the feast. But while Claire is getting ready for her meeting with Robert, Charles arrives and throws her a proposal of marriage there on the spot. Claire accepts his proposal, and sends a message via her maid to Robert, cancelling the dinner without telling him the real reason. Robert fears that Claire is taken ill and in need of a doctor. He rushes over to her house to offer his assistance, but sees Charles through the window, and realizes the real reason for her rejection.

Only two days before their wedding Charles throws a party in Claire's honor. To the party comes many distinguished guests, and among them are the newly arrived Russian gentleman Zolotov. This man sees Claire and recognizes her from St. Petersburg. During the evening Zolotov tells stories of Claire to a friend of his, Bellows, and Charles' brother-in-law hears them talk. Charles hears of the stories and is upset, challenging Zolotov to a duel. Zolotov has no wish to enter a duel with the banker, and swears he must have been mistaken, since the girl he knew was known to fake fainting to get a man's attention. At this point Claire faints and is carried out of the room.

The next day Charles comes to visit Claire in her home in order to break off their engagement. He doesn't get to meet Claire, but is instead confronted by a woman named Lili - in reality Claire, playing her illegitimate cousin from St. Petersburg. A woman of highly questionable reputation, seen from Charles' point of view. Charles agrees to meet with Lili that same night at the Oyster Bed Café, located down by the docks. Charles brings Zolotov and Bellows to the restaurant, and demands that Lili leave town never to return - he doesn't wish to be associated with the kind of woman she is. Feeling threatened, Lili decides to leave, but before she does she bumps into Robert Latour. Robert opens his heart to Lili and tells her he is in love with Claire, and has been since he first met with her. Charles finds Lili and Robert talking, and promises to settle Robert's loan debt if he takes Lili out of New Orleans. Robert agrees to this.

Robert passes by Claire's house and peers through the window, seeing Lili inside. He puts two and two together and realizes that Lili and Claire are the same person. He doesn't confront her, but tells what he has found out to Charles. They conspire to abduct Claire and hide her away on Robert's boat until the wedding. Once Robert arrives back to his boat with Claire, he sets her free and she decides to stay the night. The morning after Claire tells Robert that they will never see each other again.

The wedding is held as planned a day later, but when Claire sees Robert as one of the guests, she realizes that he is the one she loves and fakes fainting again. In the turmoil that follows, Claire disappears and is nowhere to be found. She sails away with Robert on his boat, and throws her wedding dress into the Mississippi river.

== Cast ==
- Marlene Dietrich as Countess Claire Ledoux, aka Lili
- Bruce Cabot as Robert Latour
- Roland Young as Charles Giraud
- Mischa Auer as Zolotov
- Andy Devine as Andrew, The First Sailor
- Frank Jenks as Second Sailor
- Eddie Quillan as Third Sailor
- Laura Hope Crews as Auntie
- Franklin Pangborn as Bellows
- Theresa Harris as Clementine, Claire's Maid
- Clarence Muse as Samuel, Carriage Driver
- Melville Cooper as Brother-in-Law
- Anne Revere as Giraud's Sister
- Bob Evans as William
- Emily Fitzroy as Giraud's Cousin Amelia
- Anthony Marlowe as singer
- Shemp Howard as the Oyster Bed Cafe Waiter (uncredited)

== Production ==
=== Development ===
The star was Marlene Dietrich who had revived her career at Universal appearing in Destry Rides Again (1939) produced by Joe Pasternak. In May 1940 Universal announced it would make two Dietrich films over the following year: Seven Sinners and The Countess of New Orleans. Both were to be among the studio's bigger budgeted productions.

In October 1940 Universal announced the director of Countess would be René Clair, who had arrived in Lisbon from France in August. It was Clair's first Hollywood movie although he had directed two English-language films in England. Dietrich later said Clair's hiring was Pastenak's idea and "at first I resisted, but finally out of loyalty to my old principle that doing your duty was all that mattered, I yielded." Pasternak wrote in his memoirs that he suggested Clair, asked Dietrich "What do you say?" and she said "I think it'd be wonderful."

In November Universal said they hoped to make the film in the next month. However this did not happen. In December Universal said the film would now be called The Flame of New Orleans and star Andy Devine, Roland Young and Broderick Crawford alongside Dietrich. (Crawford ended up not appearing in the film.)

Hal Wallis says George Raft "made a lot of noise" trying to play the male lead opposite Dietrich but Warners, who had Raft under contract, would not let him.

Bruce Cabot's casting was announced in January 1941. "Bruce is all right but I don't think he's Dietrich calibre," wrote Hedda Hopper. "However I can be convinced. But I'll wait till the picture's finished."

Clair later admitted he preferred to spend a long time working on the script "in great detail and very slowly" so that by the time it was done "an assistant director should be able to shoot it." However this was difficult for Flame because of his lack of command of the English language.

=== Shooting ===
Filming started 6 January 1941. Dietrich and Cabot reportedly feuded during production. She later called him "an awfully stupid actor, unable to remember his lines or cues. Nor could Clair, who didn’t speak a word of English, lend him a helping hand. Besides, Cabot was very conceited. He wouldn’t accept any help. I finally resigned myself to paying for his lessons, so that he would at least know his lines. The crew loathed Clair (surely because of the language barrier) to such an extent that the technicians almost pushed me off the set the moment they heard the order: “Pack up your things”."

During filming the New York Times reported that the Hays Office were concerned about the movie, in part because Clair was French, and it starred Dietrich as a woman of ill repute in "a colorful city during the most colorful period of its career." In particular, the Hays Office was worried about several specific scenes. Clair offered to shoot the scenes in two different ways so if the Hays Office objected Joe Pasternak would have an alternative. Krasna was on set and reworked the script constantly with Clair in order to help it get past the censors.

Krasna later said he felt that Marlene Dietrich could not play comedy, saying she had "a frozen face", and needed experienced comedic actors to play opposite her like Cary Grant and Adolphe Menjou; he thought Bruce Cabot and Roland Young were miscast (calling the leads "three people who didn't move"). He also relates that the Hays Office insisted that two reels of the film be removed for censorship reasons.

== Reception ==
=== Critical ===
Hedda Hopper said the film was like "molasses in January... Clair's direction lacks the zip we demand... the flame simmered down to a slow burn." The film received poor reviews on the whole.

Pasternak wrote "the critics were, I thought, unfair to Rene" and he felt "if Clair had made this same picture in France and it had come over here with a French soundtrack and the usual subtitles, the critical ladies and gentlemen would have been talking about "Gallic wit," "the deft French touch," and "Latin sauciness." As it was, they jumped on us hard for trying to do something a little different." He also felt that unconsciously "they berated Rene Clair for making films in this country instead of France, not realizing that Rene had come here in search of that freedom which his pictures have always sung."

Pasternak also felt "the critics were most cruel to" Dietrich "chiding her for being mannered again and all the rest of it. She thought she was spoofing her old self, but apparently the gentle satire was lost." Pasternak wrote "Marlene didn't mind" because the war was going badly for the Allies "and Marlene's heart was not entirely centered on making motion pictures. She was thinking about the war and her adopted country's imminent part in it. Myself, I was trying to get out of my contract with Universal."

=== Box office ===
Clair called the film "a big flop, and a great handicap in my American career. When I started in Hollywood, they were enthusiastic about welcoming people they knew in Europe. We really had great possibilities. But you know how Hollywood is. If they get too much on you and you fail, finish; that happened to me in Flame of New Orleans. Maybe it was a little too subtle for that time."

Clair later said "I don't know now if it's as good or as bad as it's supposed to be. I think technically it's very good, but the spirit, you know, was half European and half American, so I don't know. It was my first film in America and I was very much impressed. I didn't know really if the people would like the film. You know, you never do a film alone, but you are always impressed by the atmosphere, the air you breathe. I didn't do any American films which depicted the modern way of life. I was always trying to escape."

Dietrich said the film "was a flop. I played a double role (sisters) and, as always, wore lavish costumes, but that wasn’t enough. I didn’t particularly like Rene Clair, but I didn’t hate him as much as the rest did."

Pasternak wrote "I did not think it made the bookkeepers at Universal very happy."

The box office disappointment of the movie, along with other Pasternak productions Nice Girl and A Little Bit of Heaven, led to Universal being difficult with the budgets of Pasternak's movies, and contributed to the producer leaving Universal and going to MGM.
