= The Stage Door =

- Starring: Louise Allbritton; Scott McKay
- Country of origin: United States
- Original language: English

Original release
- Network: CBS

The Stage Door is an American drama series that aired live on CBS Tuesday night from 9:00 pm to 9:30 eastern time from February 7, 1950 to March 28, 1950. Based on the play The Stage Door by Edna Ferber and George S. Kaufman, earlier made into a film in 1937.

== Synopsis ==
The series centered on Celia and Hank, two aspiring broadway performers who were also in love with each other.

== Cast ==
- Louise Allbritton as Celia Knox
- Scott McKay as Hank Merlin
- Tom Pedi as Rocca.

== Production ==
Carol Irwin was the producer, with Ralph Nelson as director. Frank Gabrielson and Willard Keefe were writers. The program originated from WCBS-TV and was sustaining.
