= Destination Unknown (1942 film) =

1942 film

- Directed by: Ray Taylor
- Screenplay by: Lynn Riggs; John Meehan Jr.
- Story by: Lawrence Hazard; John H. Kafka
- Produced by: Marshall Grant
- Starring: William Gargan; Irene Hervey; Sam Levene
- Cinematography: John W. Boyle
- Edited by: Universal Pictures
- Distributed by: Universal Pictures
- Release date: September 10, 1942 (United States)
- Running time: 63 minutes
- Country: United States
- Language: English

Destination Unknown is a 1942 American thriller film directed by Ray Taylor and starring William Gargan, Irene Hervey and Sam Levene. It was made as a second feature film by Universal Pictures set in China in World War II.

== Cast ==
- William Gargan as Briggs Harrison
- Irene Hervey as Elena Varnoff
- Sam Levene as Victor
- Turhan Bey as Muto
- Keye Luke as Secretary
- Felix Basch as Karl Renner

== Production ==
Filming started April 1942.
