= The Climax (1930 film) =

1930 film

- Directed by: Renaud Hoffman
- Screenplay by: Lillian Ducey; Julien Josephson; Leslie Mason; Clarence Thompson
- Based on: The Climax (Play) by Edward Locke
- Produced by: Carl Laemmle
- Starring: Jean Hersholt; Kathryn Crawford; LeRoy Mason; John Reinhardt; Henry Armetta
- Cinematography: Jerome Ash
- Edited by: Bernard W. Burton
- Production company: Universal Pictures
- Distributed by: Universal Pictures
- Release date: January 26, 1930
- Running time: 65 minutes
- Country: United States
- Language: English

The Climax is a 1930 American thriller film directed by Renaud Hoffman and written by Lillian Ducey, Julien Josephson, Leslie Mason and Clarence Thompson. The film is adapted from the play of the same name by Edward Locke. The Climax stars Jean Hersholt, Kathryn Crawford, LeRoy Mason, John Reinhardt and Henry Armetta. The film was released on January 26, 1930, by Universal Pictures.

== Cast ==
- Jean Hersholt as Luigi Golfanti
- Kathryn Crawford as Adella Golfanti
- LeRoy Mason as Dr. Gardoni
- John Reinhardt as Pietro Golfanti
- Henry Armetta as Anton Donatelli

== Music ==
The film featured a theme song entitled "You, My Melody of Love" which was written by Victor Schertzinger. Also featured on the soundtrack was a song entitled "Song Of The Soul" with music by Joseph Carl Breil and lyrics by Edward Locke. A song entitled "Chalita" was also heard on the soundtrack and was written by Victor Schertzinger.

== See also ==
- The Climax (1944), a film based on the same play
