= Thomas Gomez =

American actor (1905–1971)

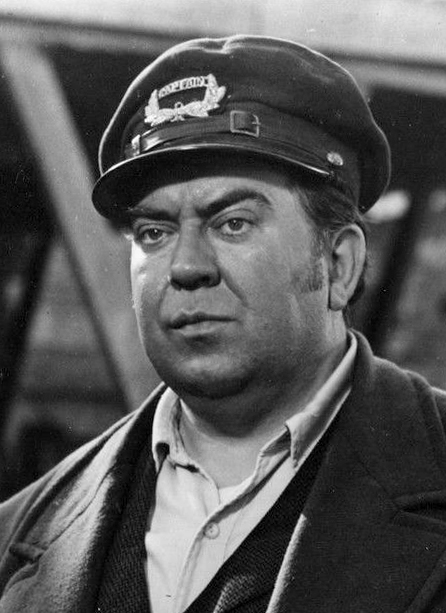
- Thomas Gomez in The Gambler from Natchez (1954)
- Born: Sabino Tomás Gómez (or Sabino Tomas Gomez or Thomas Sabino Gomez); July 10, 1905; New York City, U.S.
- Died: June 18, 1971 (aged 65); Santa Monica, California, U.S.
- Resting place: Westwood Memorial Park
- Occupation: Actor
- Years active: 1923–1971

Thomas Gomez (July 10, 1905 – June 18, 1971) was an American actor.

== Life and career ==
Spanish on his father's (Sabino Tomás Gómez) side (Gibraltar and Santander, Spain) and French-Irish on his mother's side (Alsace and County Cork), Gomez's parents migrated to New York City shortly before his birth in 1905 as Sabino Tomás Gómez (or Sabino Tomas Gomez or Thomas Sabino Gomez).

He began his acting career in theater in 1923, studying under actor Walter Hampden in a production of Cyrano de Bergerac in Syracuse, New York. He made his first film Sherlock Holmes and the Voice of Terror in 1942 and by the end of his career had appeared in sixty films.

Gomez was the first Spanish-American to be nominated for an Academy Award when he received this accolade for his performance in the 1947 film Ride the Pink Horse. Directed by and starring Robert Montgomery, it was later used as the basis for an episode of the same name for the television series Robert Montgomery Presents in which Gomez reprised his role.

His other film roles include Who Done It? (1942), Key Largo (1948), Force of Evil (1948), The Conqueror (1956) and his final film Beneath the Planet of the Apes (1970). A frequent performer on television, Gomez also appeared in guest roles in such series as The Twilight Zone, Route 66, Dr. Kildare, Mr. Ed, Burke's Law, The Virginian, It Takes a Thief, Bewitched, The Rifleman, and Gunsmoke.

Gomez had many notable stage roles, such as the one in the original Broadway run of A Man for All Seasons. Billboard lauded the "humanity and finely effective detail of his character work" in the short-running 1942 Broadway play The Flowers of Virtue. In 1956, he replaced Burl Ives as Big Daddy in the original Broadway production of Tennessee Williams's Cat on a Hot Tin Roof.

Thomas Gomez died at St. John's Hospital in Santa Monica, California, aged 65, after 3 weeks in a coma related to injuries sustained in a car accident. He was interred in the Westwood Village Memorial Park Cemetery in Los Angeles.

== Filmography ==
Year	Title	Role	Notes
1942	Sherlock Holmes and the Voice of Terror	R.F. Meade, Nazi agent	
1942	Who Done It?	Colonel J.R. Andrews	
1942	Pittsburgh	Joe Malneck	
1942	Arabian Nights	Hakim	
1943	White Savage	Sam Miller	
1943	Frontier Badmen	Ballard	
1943	Corvette K-225	Smithy	
1943	Crazy House	N.G. Wagstaff	
1944	Phantom Lady	Inspector Burgess	
1944	Follow the Boys	Himself	Uncredited
1944	In Society	Drexel	
1944	The Climax	Count Seebruck	
1944	Bowery to Broadway	Tom Harvey	
1944	Dead Man's Eyes	Captain Drury	
1944	Can't Help Singing	Jake Carstairs	
1945	Frisco Sal	Police Captain Dan Martin	
1945	Patrick the Great	Max Wilson	
1945	I'll Tell the World	J.B. Kindell	
1945	The Daltons Ride Again	'Professor' J.K.McKenna	
1946	Night in Paradise	King Croesus	
1946	Swell Guy	Dave Vinson	
1947	Johnny O'Clock	Guido Marchettis	
1947	Singapore	Mr. Mauribus	
1947	Ride the Pink Horse	Pancho	Nominated – Academy Award for Best Supporting Actor
1947	A Double Life	Cassio	Voice, Uncredited
1947	Captain from Castile	Father Bartolome Romero	
1948	Casbah	Louvain	
1948	Key Largo	Richard "Curly" Hoff	
1948	Angel in Exile	Dr. Estaban Chavez	
1948	Force of Evil	Leo Morse	
1949	Sorrowful Jones	Reardon	
1949	Come to the Stable	Luigi Rossi	
1949	That Midnight Kiss	Guido Russino Betelli	
1949	The Woman on Pier 13	Vanning	
1950	The Eagle and the Hawk	General Liguras	
1950	The Furies	El Tigre	
1950	Kim	Emissary	
1951	Harlem Globetrotters	Coach Saperstein	
1951	Anne of the Indies	Blackbeard	
1952	Macao	Police Lieutenant Felizardo Sebastian	
1952	The Sellout	Sheriff Kellwin C. Burke	
1952	The Merry Widow	King of Marshovia	
1952	Pony Soldier	Natayo Smith	
1953	Sombrero	Don Homero Calderon	
1954	The Gambler from Natchez	Captain Antoine Barbee	
1954	The Adventures of Hajji Baba	Osman Aga	
1955	The Looters	George Parkinson	
1955	Las Vegas Shakedown	Al "Gimpy" Sirago	
1955	The Magnificent Matador	Don David	
1955	Night Freight	Haight	
1956	The Conqueror	Wang Kahn	
1956	Trapeze	Bouglione	
1957	Collector's Item: The Left Fist of David	Ivor Hager	TV movie
1958	The Texan	Jake Romer	episode S1 E2 "The Man With The Solid Gold Star"
1959	The Rifleman	Artemus Quarles	Episode: "Stranger at Night"
1959	Twilight Zone	Mr. Cadwallader	Episode: "Escape Clause"
1959	John Paul Jones	Esek Hopkins	
1959	But Not for Me	Demetrios Bacos	
1960-61	Twilight Zone	Peter Sykes	Episode: Dust
1960-61	The Power and the Glory	Delgado	TV movie
1960-61	Summer and Smoke	Papa Zacharias	
1968	Shadow Over Elveron	Arturo Silvera	TV movie
1968	Stay Away, Joe	Grandpa	
1970	Beneath the Planet of the Apes	Minister	
1972	Gunsmoke	Agustin Hildago	Episode: "Hildago" (aired posthumously)
