= Glamour Boy (film) =

1941 film by Ralph Murphy

- Theatrical release poster
- Directed by: Ralph Murphy
- Screenplay by: Val Burton; F. Hugh Herbert; Bradford Ropes
- Produced by: Sol C. Siegel
- Starring: Jackie Cooper; Susanna Foster; Walter Abel; Darryl Hickman; Ann Gillis; William Demarest; Jackie Searl
- Cinematography: Daniel L. Fapp
- Edited by: William Shea
- Music by: Victor Young
- Production company: Paramount Pictures
- Distributed by: Paramount Pictures
- Release date: December 5, 1941
- Running time: 79 minutes
- Country: United States
- Language: English

Glamour Boy is a 1941 American comedy film directed by Ralph Murphy and written by Val Burton, F. Hugh Herbert and Bradford Ropes. The film stars Jackie Cooper, Susanna Foster, Walter Abel, Darryl Hickman, Ann Gillis, William Demarest and Jackie Searl. The film was released on December 5, 1941, by Paramount Pictures.

== Plot ==
Former child star Tiny Barlow is all grown up now but desperate to regain his old fame. He grabs credit for landing aspiring actress Joan Winslow a part that was intended for bigger star Brenda Lee, then tries to persuade studio head A. J. Colder to remake the film that made him a star.

Tiny's schemes land him a part in a new film, but he quits when others mock him on the set. A new child star, Billy Doran, hides in the trunk of Tiny's car, and they end up taking shelter on a farm hundreds of miles from Hollywood, where young Billy decides to pretend he's been kidnapped. Joan's pleas convince Tiny and Billy to return.

== Cast ==
- Jackie Cooper as Tiny Barlow
- Susanna Foster as Joan Winslow
- Walter Abel as Anthony J. Colder
- Darryl Hickman as Billy Doran
- Ann Gillis as Brenda Lee
- William Demarest as Papa Doran
- Jackie Searl as Georgie Clemons
- Edith Meiser as Jenny Sullivan
- John Gallaudet as Mickey Fadden
- William Wright as Hank Landon
- Charles D. Brown as Martin Carmichael
- Norma Varden as Mrs. Lee
- Kay Linaker as Mrs. Emily Colder
- Maude Eburne as Borax Betty
- Josephine Whittell as Helga Harris
- Olive Blakeney as Miss Treat
- Karin Booth as Helen Trent
- Trevor Bardette as Sheriff
- Cecil B. DeMille as Movie Director (uncredited)
