= Bowery to Broadway =

1944 film by Charles Lamont

- Directed by: Charles Lamont
- Written by: Arthur T. Horman; Edmund Joseph; Bart Lytton
- Based on: story by Joseph and Lytton
- Produced by: John Grant
- Starring: Maria Montez; Jack Oakie; Susanna Foster
- Cinematography: Charles Van Enger
- Edited by: Arthur Hilton
- Music by: Edward Ward
- Distributed by: Universal Pictures
- Release date: November 3, 1944
- Running time: 94 minutes
- Country: United States
- Language: English
- Budget: over $1 million

Bowery to Broadway is a 1944 American film starring Maria Montez, Jack Oakie, and Susanna Foster. Donald O'Connor and Peggy Ryan also had a small specialty act, and it was the only film they were in together where they did not have a name or character.

The movie was made to showcase the singing talent at Universal. Montez only has a small role.

== Cast ==
- Maria Montez as Marina
- Jack Oakie as Michael O'Rourke
- Susanna Foster as Peggy Fleming Barrie
- Turhan Bey as Ted Barrie
- Ann Blyth as Bessie Jo Kirby
- Donald Cook as Dennis Dugan
- Louise Allbritton as Lillian Russell
- Frank McHugh as Joe Kirby
- Rosemary DeCamp as Bessie Kirby
- Leo Carrillo as P.J. Fenton
- Andy Devine as Father Kelley
- Evelyn Ankers as Bonnie Latour
- Thomas Gomez as Tom Harvey
- Richard Lane as Walter Rogers
- George Dolenz as George Henshaw
- Mantan Moreland as Alabam
- Ben Carter as No-more
- Maude Eburne as Mame Alda
- Robert Warwick as Cliff Brown
- Donald O'Connor as Specialty Number
- Peggy Ryan as Specialty Number
- unbilled players include Milton Kibbee, George Meeker, Snub Pollard and Wilbur Mack

== Production ==
In June 1943 John Grant, who normally wrote for Abbott and Costello, was assigned to produce a film to cover the history of Broadway. It was going to be called Hip Hip Hooray and was budgeted at $1 million and shot in color. Edmund Joseph and Bart Lyton were assigned to do the script. In December 1943 it was announced Arthur Lubin would direct.

Filming started 1 May 1944. It was a rare non "exotic" role for Maria Montez.

== Selected Songs ==
- "Under the Bamboo Tree"
- "Yip-I-Addy-I-Ay"
- "Wait Till the Sun Shines, Nelly"
- "My Song of Romance"
- "Montevideo"
- "He Took Her for a Sleighride in the Good Old Summertime" - with Donald O'Connor and Peggy Ryan
- "There'll Always Be a Moon" - sung by Susanna Foster
- "Under the Bamboo Tree" - sung by Louise Allbritton as Lillian Russell
