= The Climax (1944 film) =

1944 film by George Waggner

- Theatrical release poster
- Directed by: George Waggner
- Screenplay by: Curt Siodmak; Lynn Starling; George Waggner
- Story by: Curt Siodmak
- Based on: The Climax by Edward Locke
- Produced by: George Waggner
- Starring: Boris Karloff; Susanna Foster; Turhan Bey
- Music by: Edward Ward
- Distributed by: Universal Pictures
- Release date: October 20, 1944
- Running time: 86 minutes
- Country: United States
- Language: English
- Budget: $750,000

The Climax is a 1944 American horror film produced by Universal Pictures. The credits state this George Waggner film is based on the 1909 play of the same name by Edward Locke, although the plot has little connection to Locke's play. Originally intended to be a sequel to Universal's remake of the Phantom of the Opera (1943), it featured new characters and a new plot.

== Plot ==
The physician at the Vienna Royal Theatre, Dr. Hohner (Karloff) murders his fiancée, a prima donna, out of obsession and jealousy. Ten years later, he hears another young singer (Foster) who reminds him of the late diva, and is determined to make her sing only for him, even if it means silencing her forever.

== Cast ==
- Boris Karloff as Dr. Friedrich Hohner
- Susanna Foster as Angela Klatt
- Turhan Bey as Franz Munzer
- Gale Sondergaard as Luise
- Thomas Gomez as Count Seebruck
- June Vincent as Marcellina
- George Dolenz as Amato Roselli
- Ludwig Stössel as Carl Baumann
- Jane Farrar as Jarmila Vadek
- Ernő Verebes as Brunn
- Lotte Stein as Mama Hinzl
- Scotty Beckett as The King
- William Edmunds as Leon, the theater concierge
- Maxwell Hayes as Count Romburg, the King's aide
- Dorothy Lawrence as Miss Metzger
- Francis Ford as Backstage Attendant (uncredited)

== Production ==
The film was originally conceived as a sequel to Phantom of the Opera (1943). The Climax was made using the sets of the Phantom of the Opera remake, which in turn used Universal's opera house set for the original Phantom of the Opera (1925). Choreography was by Lester Horton. The film was also nominated for an Academy Award in 1944 for Best Art Direction (John B. Goodman, Alexander Golitzen, Russell A. Gausman, Ira S. Webb).

== Reception ==
The Climax was a box office disappointment.

== Home media ==
This film, along with Night Key, Tower of London, The Strange Door and The Black Castle, was released on DVD in 2006 by Universal Studios as part of The Boris Karloff Collection.

In 2020, it was released in high definition as part of Scream Factory's Universal Horror Collection, Vol. 4 Blu-ray set.

== See also ==
- The Climax (1930), a film based on the same play
- List of American films of 1944
- Boris Karloff filmography
