= Louise Allbritton =

American actress (1920–1979)

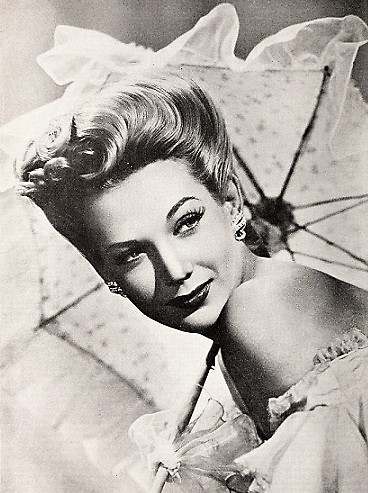
- Allbritton in 1944
- Born: July 3, 1920; Oklahoma City, Oklahoma, U.S.
- Died: February 16, 1979 (aged 58); Puerto Vallarta, Mexico
- Other name: Louise Albritton
- Education: University of Oklahoma
- Occupation: Actress
- Years active: 1942–1964
- Spouse: Charles Collingwood (m. 1946)

Louise Allbritton (July 3, 1920 – February 16, 1979) was an American film and stage actress born in Oklahoma City, Oklahoma. Her name was sometimes seen as Louise Albritton.

She played in such films as Pittsburgh (1942), Who Done It? (1942), Son of Dracula (1943), The Egg and I (1947), and Sitting Pretty (1948).

== Early life and career ==
Allbritton was born in Oklahoma City on July 3, 1920, the second daughter of James Oliver Allbritton and Madge Oneta (née Barron) of San Angelo, Texas. She attended the University of Oklahoma and gained acting experience in the Pasadena Playhouse. Her father cut off her allowance in hopes that she would return home, but her contract with Universal Studios enabled her to continue in Hollywood.

During World War II, Allbritton performed overseas with a USO troupe, a group which "[g]ave show after show, many of them to the accompaniment of the thunder of enemy guns."

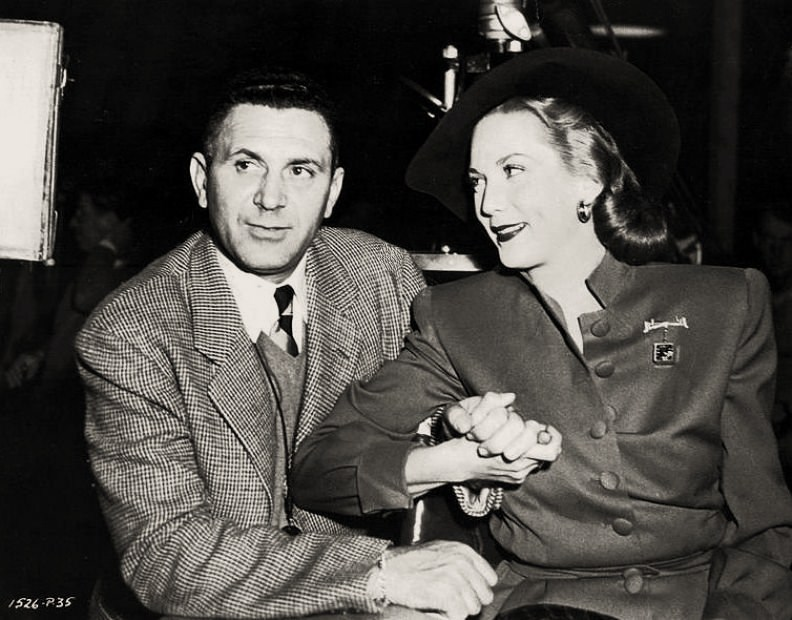
Allbritton (right) and Milton R. Krasner on the set of The Egg and I (1947)

Allbritton was one of several replacements for the leading female role in the long-running Broadway production of The Seven Year Itch. On television, she played the title role in the NBC daytime serial Concerning Miss Marlowe (1954) and co-starred in the CBS drama The Stage Door (1950).

== Personal life ==
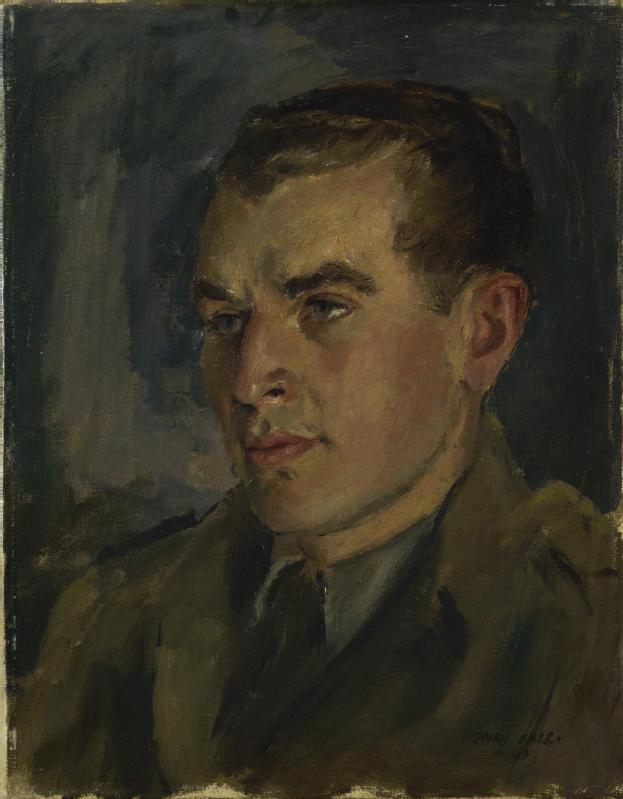
1943 portrait of Allbritton's husband Charles Collingwood by Henry Carr

She was married to CBS news correspondent and author Charles Collingwood from 1946 until her death and retired several years after their marriage.

== Death ==
Allbritton died of cancer on February 16, 1979 in Puerto Vallarta, Mexico, where she and Collingwood had one of their homes.

== Complete filmography ==
- Not a Ladies' Man (1942) as Ethel Burlridge
- Danger in the Pacific (1942) as Jane Claymore
- Parachute Nurse (1942) as Helen Ames
- Keeping Fit (1942, Short) as Miss Allbritton
- Who Done It? (1942) as Miss Allbritton
- Pittsburgh (1942) as Shannon Prentiss
- It Comes Up Love (1943) as Edie Ives
- Good Morning, Judge (1943) as Elizabeth Christine Smith
- Fired Wife (1943) as Tahitha 'Tig' Callahan Dunne
- Crazy House (1943) as Louise Allbritton (uncredited)
- Son of Dracula (1943) as Katherine Caldwell
- Her Primitive Man (1944) as Sheila Winthrop
- Follow the Boys (1944) as herself (uncredited)
- This Is the Life (1944) as Harriet West Jarrett
- San Diego, I Love You (1944) as Virginia McCooley
- Bowery to Broadway (1944) - Lillian Russell
- Men in Her Diary (1945) as Isabel Glenning
- That Night with You (1945) as Sheila Morgan
- Tangier (1946) as Dolores
- The Egg and I (1947) as Harriet Putnam
- Sitting Pretty (1948) as Edna Philby
- Walk a Crooked Mile (1948) as Dr. Toni Neva
- An Innocent Affair (1948) as Margot Fraser
- The Doolins of Oklahoma (1949) as Rose of Cimarron
- Alfred Hitchcock Presents (1956) season 1, episode 30, "Never Again" as Renee Marlow
- Felicia (1964) as Felicia

== Radio appearances ==
Year	Program	Episode/source
1943	Lady Esther Screen Guild Theatre	Men in White
1944	Lady Esther Screen Guild Theatre	Phantom Lady
