= Prisoners of the Casbah =

1953 film by Richard L. Bare

- Directed by: Richard L. Bare
- Written by: DeVallon Scott
- Produced by: Sam Katzman
- Starring: Gloria Grahame; Cesar Romero; Turhan Bey
- Cinematography: Henry Freulich
- Edited by: Charles Nelson
- Production company: Columbia Pictures
- Distributed by: Columbia Pictures
- Release date: November 3, 1953
- Running time: 78 minutes
- Country: United States
- Language: English

Prisoners of the Casbah is a 1953 American adventure film directed by Richard L. Bare and starring Gloria Grahame, Cesar Romero and Turhan Bey.

The film's art direction was by Paul Palmentola.

== Cast ==
- Gloria Grahame as Princess Nadja / Yasmin
- Cesar Romero as Firouz
- Turhan Bey as Ahmed
- Nestor Paiva as Marouf
- Paul Newlan 1st Thief
- Frank Richards as 2nd Thief
- John Parrish as 3rd Thief
- Lucille Barkley as Soura
- Philip Van Zandt as Selim
- Wade Crosby as Yagoub
- Gloria Saunders as Zeida
- Eddie Fields as Abdullah
- Baynes Barron as Guard
- Mimi Borrel as Slave Girl
- John Crawford as Guard
- Frank Ellis as Soldier
- William Fawcett as Snake Charmer
- Eddie Foster as Rashid
- Leonard P. Geer as Thief
- Nelson Leigh as Emir
- John Mansfield as Mokar
- Paul Marion as Arab Dog
- John Marshall as Ayub
- Ray Singer as Yussem
- Willetta Smith as Slave Girl

== Bibliography ==
- Lentz, Robert J. Gloria Grahame, Bad Girl of Film Noir: The Complete Career. McFarland, 1981.
