= The Doolins of Oklahoma =

1949 film by Gordon Douglas

- Directed by: Gordon Douglas
- Written by: Kenneth Gamet
- Produced by: Harry Joe Brown
- Starring: Randolph Scott; George Macready; Louise Allbritton
- Cinematography: Charles Lawton Jr.
- Edited by: Charles Nelson
- Music by: George Duning; Paul Sawtell
- Production company: Producers-Actors Corporation
- Distributed by: Columbia Pictures
- Release date: May 27, 1949
- Running time: 90 minutes
- Country: United States
- Language: English

The Doolins of Oklahoma is a 1949 American Western film directed by Gordon Douglas and starring Randolph Scott, George Macready and Louise Allbritton. It was distributed by Columbia Pictures.

== Plot ==
Former Dalton gang member Bill Doolin puts together his own bank-robbing gang but federal Marshals are closing in.

== Cast ==
- Randolph Scott as Bill Doolin / Bill Daley
- George Macready as Marshal Sam Hughes
- Louise Allbritton as Rose of Cimarron
- John Ireland as Bitter Creek
- Virginia Huston as Elaine Burton
- Charles Kemper as Thomas "Arkansas" Jones
- Noah Beery Jr. as Little Bill
- Dona Drake as Cattle Annie
- Robert Barrat as Marshal Heck Thomas
- Lee Patrick as Melissa Price
- Griff Barnett as Deacon Burton
- Frank Fenton as Red Buck
- Jock Mahoney as Tulsa Jack Blake (as Jock O'Mahoney)

== Reception ==
In his 2007 review, Dennis Schwartz gave the movie a grade of B, describing it as "a familiar Western formulaic set-up of a good man caught by circumstances and trapped in a life of crime" and stating "The old-fashioned story leaves a lot to be desired, but the cast takes it seriously and makes the unbelievable look as believable as possible."
