= The Case of Becky =

1921 film

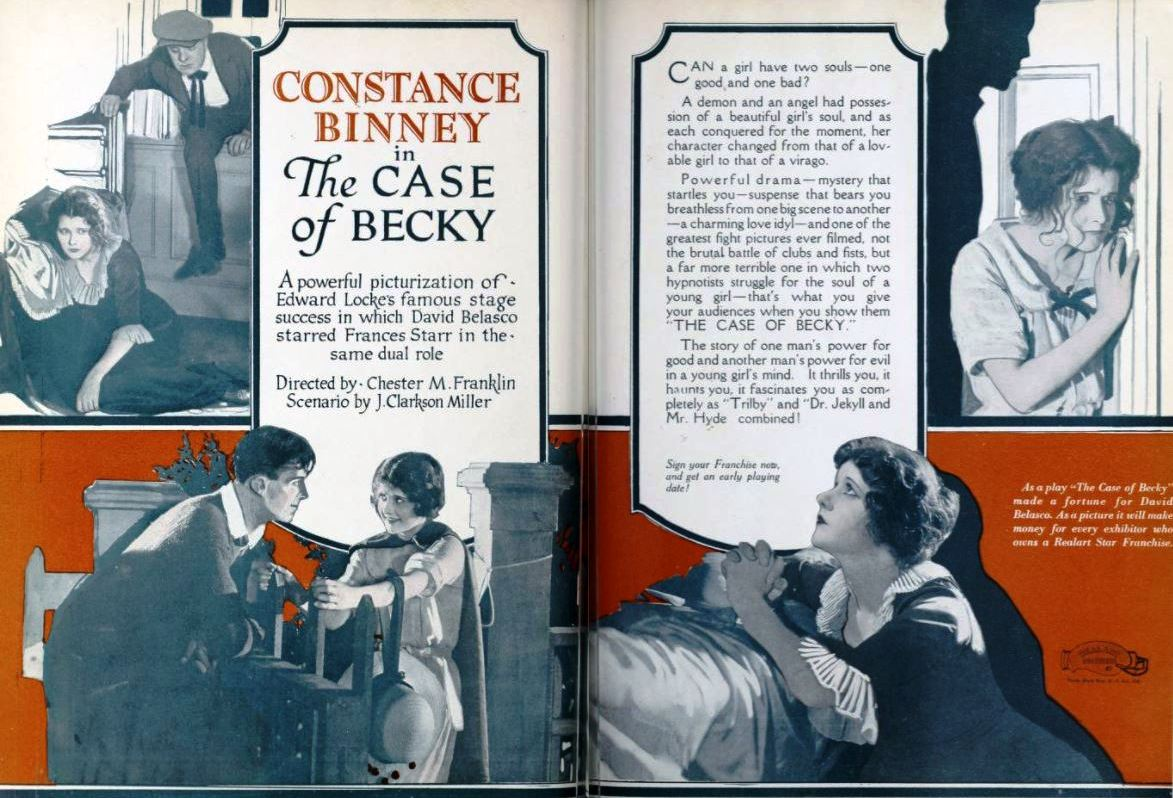
- Advertisement
- Directed by: Chester M. Franklin
- Written by: J. Clarkson Miller
- Based on: The Case of Becky by Edward J. Locke and David Belasco
- Produced by: Realart Pictures
- Starring: Constance Binney; Montagu Love; Glenn Hunter
- Cinematography: George J. Folsey
- Distributed by: Paramount Pictures
- Release date: October 9, 1921
- Running time: 60 minutes; 6 reels (1675.79 meters)
- Country: United States
- Language: Silent (English intertitles)

The Case of Becky is a lost 1921 American silent drama film based on a successful 1912 play written by David Belasco and Edward J. Locke, The Case of Becky. Belasco also produced the play, which starred his muse, Frances Starr.

The film was produced by Realart Pictures, directed by Chester M. Franklin, written by J. Clarkson Miller and released through Paramount Pictures. George J. Folsey was the cinematographer.

The play was filmed earlier (in 1915) in a version starring Blanche Sweet, which emphasized the horror elements.

Montagu Love went on to star in several other silent horror films, The Haunted House (1929) and The Cat Creeps (1930).

== Plot ==
Dorothy Stone is the step-daughter of barn-storming hypnotist Professor Balzamo, who has used her as his subject since childhood. During his hypnosis act, she becomes her evil alter ego named Becky. Her mother's deathbed warning leads Dorothy to leave the hypnotist and she finds shelter in a small town with Mrs. Arnold and her son John, who falls in love with her. When he gives her an engagement ring, the flashing stone induces a reversion to her evil personality. The famous psychologist Dr. Emerson diagnoses her case correctly and attempts a cure. The chance visit by the hypnotist results in a situation where Dorothy is permanently cured and learns that she is actually the daughter of the physician. After Balzamo commits suicide, there is a happy ending.

== Cast ==
- Constance Binney as Dorothy Stone
- Glenn Hunter as John Arnold
- Frank McCormack as Dr. Emerson
- Montagu Love as Professor Balzamo
- Margaret Seddon as Mrs. Emerson
- Jane Jennings as Mrs. Arnold

== Preservation status ==
A copy is held at UCLA Film and Television Archive. This film was formerly thought to be lost.
