= That Night with You =

1945 film directed by William A. Seiter

- Directed by: William A. Seiter
- Screenplay by: Michael Fessier; Ernest Pagano
- Story by: Arnold Belgard
- Produced by: Howard Benedict; Michael Fessier; Ernest Pagano
- Starring: Susanna Foster; Franchot Tone; Louise Allbritton
- Cinematography: Charles Van Enger
- Edited by: Fred R. Feitshans Jr.
- Music by: Hans J. Salter
- Production company: Universal Pictures
- Distributed by: Universal Pictures
- Release date: September 28, 1945
- Running time: 84 minutes
- Country: United States
- Language: English

That Night With You is a 1945 American comedy film directed by William A. Seiter and starring Susanna Foster, Franchot Tone and Louise Allbritton. Produced and distributed by Universal Pictures, it featured Buster Keaton in a supporting role. At one stage the film used the working title Once Upon a Dream.

== Plot ==
Ambitious young singer Penny Parker tries to get her big break by pretending to be the daughter of playboy Broadway producer Paul Renaud from one of his former romantic affairs. He quickly sees through her lie, but welcomes her into his home anyway.

== Cast ==
- Franchot Tone as Paul Renaud
- Susanna Foster as Penny Parker
- David Bruce as Johnny
- Louise Allbritton as Sheila Morgan
- Jacqueline deWit as Blossom Drake
- Irene Ryan as Prudence
- Buster Keaton as Sam, a Short Order Cook
- Howard Freeman as Wilbur Weedy
- Barbara Sears as Clarissa
- Teddy Infuhr as Bingo

== Bibliography ==
- Neibaur, James L. The Fall of Buster Keaton: His Films for MGM, Educational Pictures, and Columbia. Scarecrow Press, 2010.
