= Susanna Foster =

American actress (1924–2009)

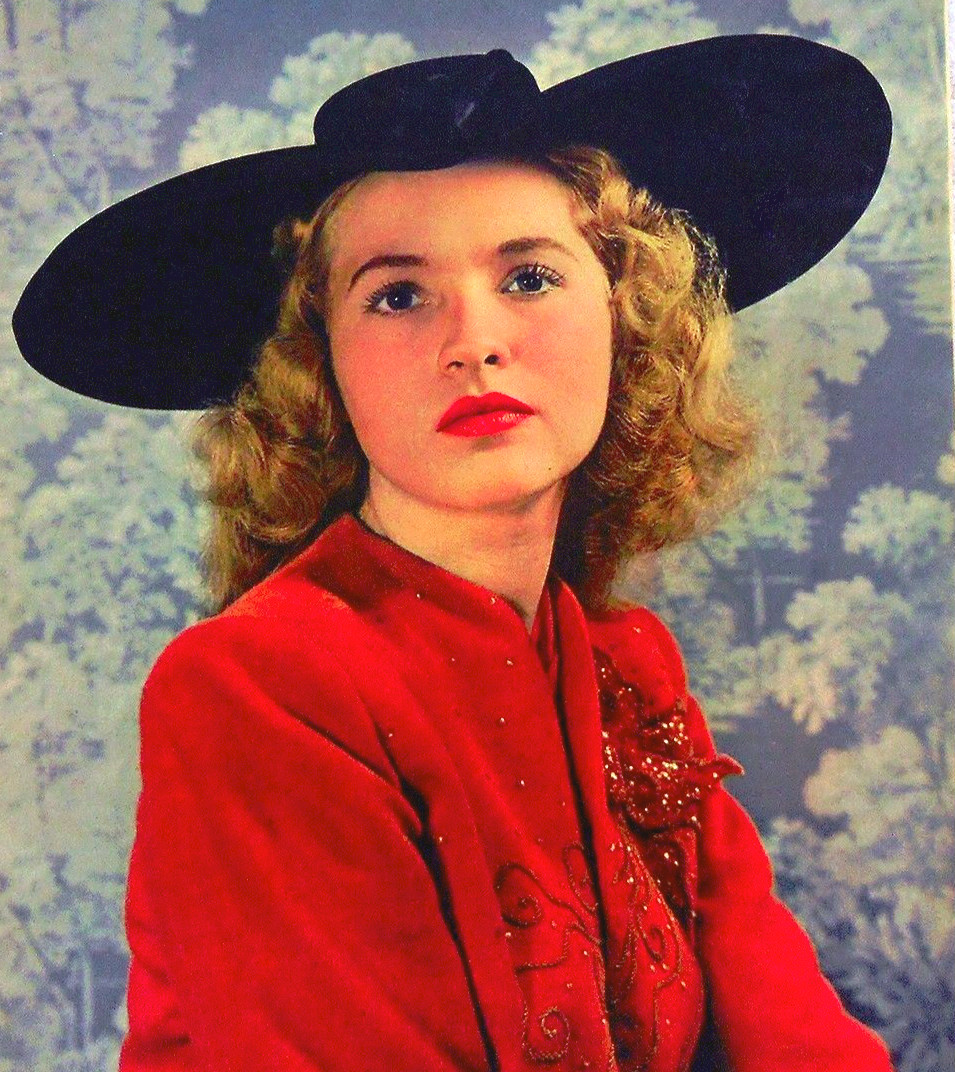
- Foster in 1943
- Born: Suzanne DeLee Flanders Larson; December 6, 1924; Chicago, Illinois, U.S.
- Died: January 17, 2009 (aged 84); Englewood, New Jersey, U.S.
- Occupations: Actress, singer
- Years active: 1939–1992
- Spouse: Wilbur "Wib" Evans (m. 1948; div. 1956)

Susanna Foster (born Suzanne DeLee Flanders Larson; December 6, 1924 – January 17, 2009) was an American film actress best known for her leading role as Christine in the 1943 film version of Phantom of the Opera.

== Early life ==
Foster was born Suzanne DeLee Flanders Larson in Chicago, Illinois, to Les and Adie Larson. Raised in Minneapolis, Minnesota, the family went into poverty in the Great Depression, and moved frequently due to evictions. Adie struggled with alcoholism and mental illness, and was reported to be abusive; at one point in her film career, Foster rented the home of actress Jean Arthur for her younger sisters, in an attempt to get them away from their mother. At eleven years old, she had "almost fatal" pneumonia.

== Career ==
At the age of twelve, Suzanne was taken to Hollywood by MGM, who sent her to school and groomed her for an acting and singing career. She claimed the high point of being at MGM was meeting her idol Jeanette MacDonald and Clark Gable, who treated her like "the Queen of England." Foster was originally slated to star in the MGM production of B Above High C, a film that was never made. The movie's title referred to the top of her vocal register. MGM eventually let her go.

After hiring agent Milo Marchetti, Foster was signed by Paramount Pictures where she began to study voice for the first time with Marchetti's sister Gilda. She made her film debut at fourteen years of age where she was introduced as 'Susanna Foster' in The Great Victor Herbert (1939) opposite Mary Martin and Allan Jones. For her stage name, she chose "Susanna" from the song Oh Susanna and Foster from its writer Stephen Foster. After seeing Foster in The Great Victor Herbert, William Randolph Hearst flew her to his 67,000-acre (270 km^{2}) estate Wyntoon for a private recital for him and Marion Davies. The following year for Paramount she appeared in There's Magic in Music opposite Allan Jones and Glamour Boy opposite Jackie Cooper. After two years, Foster left Paramount.

Within weeks of leaving Paramount, Foster signed with Universal Studios, where she portrayed the ingénue in the 1943 film version of the Gothic melodrama Phantom of the Opera opposite Nelson Eddy and Claude Rains. The film garnered two Academy Awards and was Universal's biggest money-maker that year. Hearst columnist Louella Parsons, who had the power and reputation to make or break stars, stated, "Susanna Foster establishes herself as one of the great stars of today." She became so popular the studio set her on a meteoric rise with back-to-back pictures during the years 1943 to 1945, including Star Spangled Rhythm, Top Man, This Is the Life, The Climax, Bowery to Broadway, Frisco Sal, and That Night with You. She also turned down a joint concert tour with Nelson Eddy, which she later regretted.

In 1945, Foster quit the film business. Desperate to hold onto its star, Universal sought to make her dream of grand opera come true, financing a six-month tour of a post war Europe in 1946 with Dusolina Giannini. On her return from Europe, she was pressed by Universal to appear as guest soloist for the White House Press Photographer's Ball with President Harry Truman and Eleanor Roosevelt in attendance. After the performance, Truman and Roosevelt praised Foster with their turn at the microphone. She shared the table with Roosevelt, Truman, and his daughter Margaret, an aspiring singer herself who admired Foster.

In 1946, Foster accepted the lead role in the Los Angeles Civic Light Opera's production of Naughty Marietta headed by Rodgers and Hammerstein associate Edwin Lester. In 1948, she married her leading man Wilbur "Wib" Evans, a renowned baritone 20 years her senior. The couple performed in operettas and stage musicals, touring extensively. After a debilitating miscarriage, their first son Michael was born 8 weeks premature in December 1950.

Evans was soon chosen as Mary Martin's co-star in London's South Pacific, the show that gave Sean Connery his start as a dancing and singing sailor. During the London engagement their second son was born, brought into the world by Queen Elizabeth's doctor, John Peel, who also attended in the births of others to the Royal family, including Prince Charles and Princess Anne. Philip was named in honor of the Queen's husband Prince Philip.

== Later life and death ==
In 1956, Foster abruptly divorced Evans, and for many years, lived in and out of poverty. Author Sharon Rich and Foster's son Michael later stated Foster herself struggled with mental illness and alcoholism. In the 1980s, Foster and her younger son, Philip, lived in a Hollywood apartment. In November 1985, Philip – who also struggled with alcoholism as well as drug addiction – lapsed into a hepatic coma on Foster's living room floor and died three days later in the Van Nuys Hospital from liver failure.

In 1992, Foster made her final appearance with a minor role in the remake of the 1945 film Detour. The film, her first in 43 years, was released straight-to-home video. In 2003, her elder son Michael brought her back to the East Coast, where she spent the last five years of her life living at the Lillian Booth Actors Home in Englewood, New Jersey. Foster died at 5:30 a.m. EST on January 17, 2009 (aged 84).

== Filmography ==
Film
Year	Title	Role	Notes
1939	The Great Victor Herbert	Peggy	
1941	The Hard-Boiled Canary	Toodles LaVerne	
1941	Glamour Boy	Joan Winslow	
1942	Star Spangled Rhythm	Herself	Uncredited
1943	Phantom of the Opera	Christine DuBois	
1943	Top Man	Connie Allen	
1944	Follow the Boys	Herself	Uncredited
1944	This Is the Life	Angela Rutherford	
1944	The Climax	Angela Klatt	
1944	Bowery to Broadway	Peggy Fleming Barrie	
1945	Frisco Sal	Sally Warren	
1945	That Night with You	Penny Parker	
1954	Mystification	Rita	
1992	Detour	Evie	(final film role)
2000	The Opera Ghost: A Phantom Unmasked	Herself	Video documentary
