= Top Man (film) =

1943 film by Charles Lamont

- Directed by: Charles Lamont
- Written by: Ken Goldsmith; Zachary Gold
- Produced by: Milton Schwarzwald
- Starring: Donald O'Connor
- Cinematography: Hal Mohr
- Music by: Frank Skinner
- Distributed by: Universal Pictures
- Release date: September 17, 1943
- Running time: 74 minutes
- Country: United States
- Language: English
- Box office: $1 million (US rentals)

Top Man (also known as Man of the Family) is a 1943 American black-and-white musical comedy film directed by Charles Lamont and starring Donald O'Connor, Susanna Foster, Lillian Gish, Richard Dix, and Peggy Ryan. It was O'Connor and Ryan's first film away from the third of their trio, Gloria Jean.
