= Phantom of the Opera (1943 film) =

1943 horror film directed by Arthur Lubin

- Theatrical release poster
- Directed by: Arthur Lubin
- Screenplay by: Samuel Hoffenstein; Eric Taylor
- Story by: John Jacoby
- Based on: The Phantom of the Opera; 1910 novel by Gaston Leroux
- Produced by: George Waggner
- Starring: Nelson Eddy; Susanna Foster; Claude Rains; Edgar Barrier; Leo Carrillo; Jane Farrar; J. Edward Bromberg; Fritz Feld; Hume Cronyn
- Cinematography: W. Howard Greene; Hal Mohr
- Edited by: Russell F. Schoengarth
- Music by: Edward Ward
- Color process: Technicolor
- Production company: Universal Pictures
- Distributed by: Universal Pictures
- Release dates: August 12, 1943 (Los Angeles, California); August 27, 1943 (United States)
- Running time: 92 minutes
- Country: United States
- Language: English
- Budget: $1.75 million
- Box office: $1.6 million (US rentals); 2,316,416 admissions (France, 1945)

Phantom of the Opera is a 1943 American romantic horror film directed by Arthur Lubin, loosely based on Gaston Leroux's 1910 novel The Phantom of the Opera and its 1925 film adaptation starring Lon Chaney. Produced and distributed by Universal Pictures, the film stars Nelson Eddy, Susanna Foster and Claude Rains. It was composed by Edward Ward.

The first adaptation of the source material to be filmed entirely in Technicolor, Phantom of the Opera was even more freely adapted than Universal's silent picture. The film reused Universal's elaborate replica of the Opéra Garnier interior, which had originally been created for the 1925 film. Despite mixed contemporary reviews, the film was a box office success. It is also the only classic Universal horror film to win an Oscar, for Art Direction and Cinematography. Over the years it has received a more positive reception from modern critics.

== Plot ==
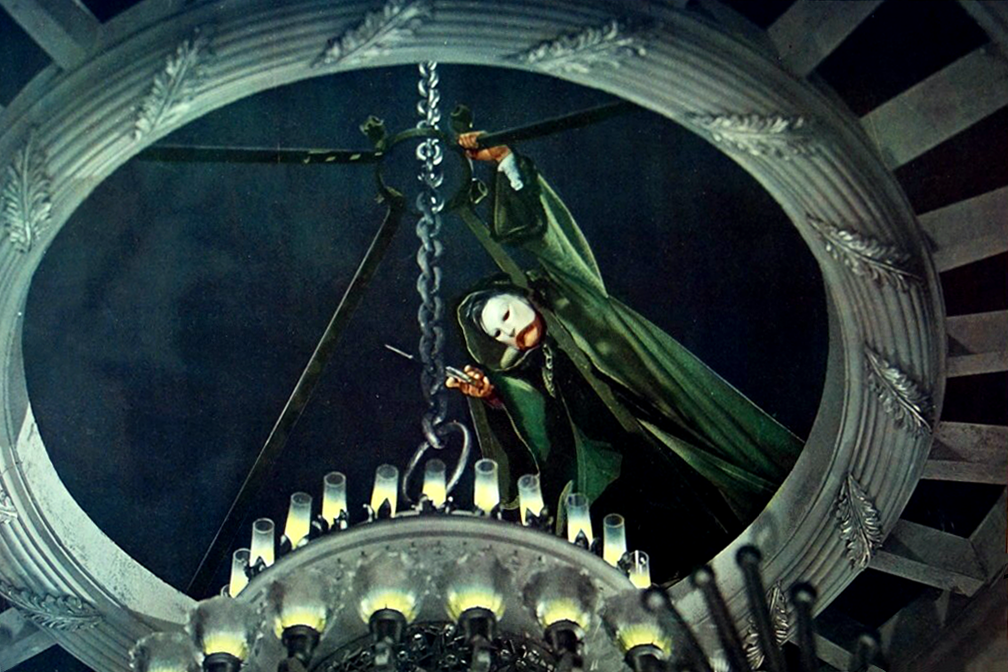
Claude Rains as the Phantom of the Opera.

Violinist Erique Claudin is dismissed from the Paris Opera House after revealing that he is losing the use of the fingers of his left hand. Unbeknownst to the conductor, who assumes Claudin can support himself, the musician has used all his money to help anonymously fund voice lessons for Christine Dubois, a young soprano to whom he is devoted. Meanwhile, Christine is pressured by Inspector Raoul Dubert to quit the Opera and marry him. But famed opera baritone Anatole Garron hopes to win Christine's heart despite this. Christine considers them both good friends but doesn't openly express if she loves them.

In a desperate attempt to earn money, Claudin submits a piano concerto he has written for publication. After weeks of not hearing any response about his concerto, he becomes worried and returns to the workaholic publisher, Maurice Pleyel, to ask about it. Pleyel rudely tells him to leave. Claudin hears his concerto being played in the office and is convinced that Pleyel is trying to steal it; unbeknownst to him, a visiting Franz Liszt had been playing and endorsing the concerto. Enraged, Claudin strangles Pleyel. Georgette, the publisher's assistant, throws etching acid in Claudin's face, horribly scarring him forever. Now wanted for murder, Claudin flees into the sewers of the Opera and covers his disfigurement with a prop mask stolen from the Opera house, thus becoming the Phantom.

During a performance of the opera Amour et gloire, the Phantom drugs a glass of red wine which prima donna Biancarolli drinks, knocking her unconscious. The director puts Christine in her place, and she dazzles the audience with her singing. Biancarolli, who suspects that Garron and Christine are responsible for drugging her, orders Raoul to arrest them, but he says he cannot because there is no evidence. Biancarolli says she will forget the affair only if Christine is replaced as understudy and her performance is not mentioned in the papers. The following night, the Phantom kills Biancarolli and her maid, and the opera is subsequently closed.

After some time, the opera's owners receive a note demanding that Christine replace Biancarolli. To catch the Phantom, Raoul comes up with a plan: not let Christine sing during a performance of the (fictional) Russian opera Le Prince masqué du Caucase ("The Masked Prince of the Caucasus") to lure the Phantom out into the open. Garron plans to have Liszt play Claudin's concerto after the performance, but the Phantom strangles one of Raoul's men and heads to the auditorium's domed ceiling. He then brings down the large chandelier on the audience, causing chaos. As the audience and the crew flee, the Phantom takes Christine down underground. He tells Christine that he loves her and she will now sing all she wants, but only for him.

Raoul, Anatole, and the police begin pursuing them underground. Just as the Phantom and Christine arrive in his lair, they hear Liszt and the orchestra playing Claudin's concerto. The Phantom plays along with the melody on his piano orchestra. Christine watches, realizing the concerto was written around the melody of a lullaby she has known since childhood. Raoul and Anatole hear the Phantom playing and follow the sound. Overjoyed, the Phantom urges Christine to sing, which she does. While the Phantom is distracted by the music, Christine sneaks up and pulls off his mask, revealing his disfigured face. At that same moment, Raoul and Anatole break-in. Claudin grabs a sword to fight them with. Raoul fires his gun at Claudin, but Anatole knocks Raoul's arm, and the shot hits the ceiling, causing a cave-in. Anatole and Raoul escape with Christine, while Claudin is seemingly crushed to death by the falling rocks.

Later, Anatole and Raoul demand that Christine choose one of them. She surprises them by choosing to marry neither one of them, instead choosing to pursue her singing career, inspired by Claudin's devotion to her future. Anatole and Raoul later go to dinner together.

== Cast ==
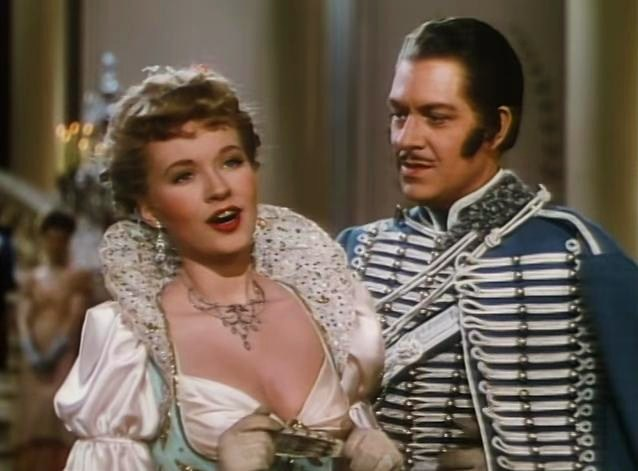
Susanna Foster and Nelson Eddy in Phantom of the Opera.

- Nelson Eddy as Anatole Garron
- Susanna Foster as Christine DuBois
- Claude Rains as Erique Claudin/The Phantom of the Opera
- Edgar Barrier as Raoul Dubert
- Leo Carrillo as Signor Ferretti
- Jane Farrar as Biancarolli (singing voice provided by Sally Sweetland)
- J. Edward Bromberg as Amiot
- Fritz Feld as Lecours
- Frank Puglia as Villeneuve
- Steven Geray as Vercheres
- Barbara Everest as Aunt
- Hume Cronyn as Gerard
- Fritz Leiber as Liszt
- Nicki Andre as Lorenzi
- Gladys Blake as Jeanne
- Elvira Curci as Biancarolli's Maid
- Hans Herbert as Marcel
- Kate Lawson as Landlady
- Miles Mander as Pleyel
- Rosina Galli as Christine's Maid
- Paul Marion as Desjardines
- Walter Stahl as Doctor
- Anthony Marlowe as Singer

== Development and production ==
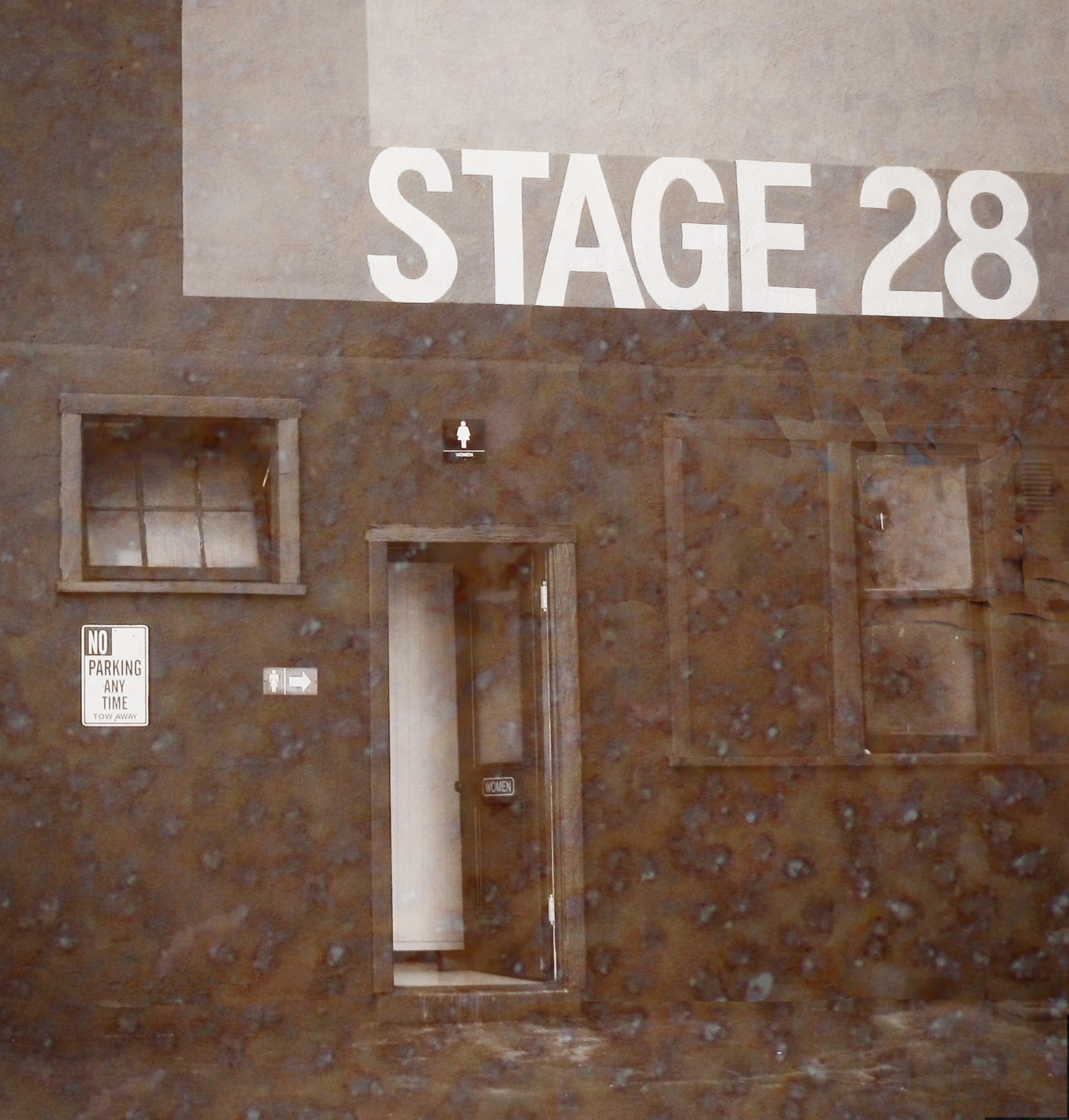
Stage 28, also known as The Phantom of the Opera Stage, was originally built for the 1925 film, and reused in the 1943 version.

Universal first announced a remake of The Phantom of the Opera in 1935. Set to be directed by Anatole Litvak, this version would have been set in modern-day Paris, and would have portrayed the Phantom as a psychologically wounded World War I veteran who was physically unharmed, but imagined that he was disfigured. However, development lingered as the studio faced financial problems that resulted in the ousting of the original film's producer Carl Laemmle and his son, Carl Laemmle Jr.

Plans for the remake finally surfaced again in November 1941, when Henry Koster became attached to direct. Koster discarded the previous screenplay, and envisioned a new version of the story in which the Phantom was Christine's father. Under Koster, the initial casting included Boris Karloff as the Phantom, Allan Jones as Raoul, and Deanna Durbin as Christine. Eddy was cast after leaving MGM for a two-picture deal with Universal. This led to Durbin refusing the role, not wanting to be compared to Eddy's frequent film partner Jeanette MacDonald, who Durbin admired. Universal then tested its other resident soprano star, Gloria Jean, only to reject her because she was thought too young (age 16). Karloff also became unavailable, and Koster also considered Cesar Romero, Feodor Chaliapin, Charles Laughton, and Broderick Crawford for the Phantom. Producer George Waggner eventually fired Koster from the project.

After Koster's firing, Arthur Lubin was brought on to direct. Under Lubin, Koster's subplot about the Phantom being Christine's father was jettisoned, because it gave the romantic elements of their relationship incestuous overtones; yet the Phantom's obsession with Christine is still not completely stated within the film. Lubin cast Rains in the film almost immediately, saying he was his "only choice" for the role. Foster, who had just left Paramount Pictures, was cast after meeting Lubin through a mutual friend, and auditioning for Waggner. Filming began on January 21, 1943.

Lux Radio Theater presented a radio adaptation of the film on September 13, 1943. Nelson Eddy, Susanna Foster and Edgar Barrier reprised their roles from the film; Basil Rathbone replaced Rains as Erique Claudin. This presentation was produced and hosted by Cecil B. DeMille.

=== Score ===
The score was written by Edward Ward. For the Amour et gloire opera sequences, Ward adapted music from Tchaikovsky's Symphony No. 4 and used themes by Chopin. He also composed an original theme song, Lullaby of the Bells, which was heard in the film as the Phantom's piano concerto. The movie begins with a fragment from Martha, oder Der Markt zu Richmond (Martha, or The Market at Richmond) written by composer Friedrich von Flotow.

Soundtrack credits

- Lullaby of the Bells (uncredited), written by Edward Ward; lyrics by George Waggner; sung by Susanna Foster and Nelson Eddy.
- Martha (Act III, opera excerpt) (uncredited), written by Friedrich von Flotow; lyrics translated by William von Wymetall; sung by Nelson Eddy, Jane Farrar (dubbed by Sally Sweetland), Susanna Foster, and company.
- Amour et gloire (uncredited), (French opera sequence), adapted by Edward Ward from themes by Frédéric Chopin; lyrics by George Waggner, translated by William von Wymetal; sung by Nelson Eddy, Jane Farrar (dubbed by Sally Sweetland), Susanna Foster, and company.
- Le Prince masqué du Caucase (uncredited) (Russian opera sequence), adapted by Edward Ward (from Tchaikovsky's Symphony No. 4); lyrics by George Waggner, translated by William von Wymetal; sung by Nelson Eddy, Nicki Andre and company.

== Reception ==
Contemporary reviews were mixed. Independent Film Bulletin frankly preferred the silent version, noting that "the new film has too much opera and too little excitement for mass audiences. The lengthy operatic passages (which are splendidly sung and should attract music lovers) will not set so well with the horror fans who will be drawn by anticipation of a real blood-and-thunder thriller. In brief, it seems that the new Phantom of the Opera will not satisfy music lovers or horror lovers. However, it is a ballyhoo natural and where sold energetically by the showman it should garner good grosses." Film Daily commended the studio's new approach to the material: "By toning down the gruesome details and playing up what light moments the subject affords, Universal has widened the film's appeal to women and those who are not out-and-out shocker fans. The boxoffice potentialities of the film have been additionally enhanced by refraining from making the phantom, as played by Claude Rains, the hideous and repellent creature that Lon Chaney made him in the original version." Bosley Crowther of The New York Times panned the film for being "watered down" from the original, calling the opening sequence "the only one in the film in which the potential excitement of the story is realized", while otherwise the "richness of décor and music is precisely what gets in the way of the tale." Variety called it "a vivid, elaborate, and, within its original story limitations, an effective production geared for substantial grosses". Trade publisher Pete Harrison called it "a good entertainment, the sort that will direct an appeal to all types of audiences". David Lardner's review in The New Yorker dismissed the film, calling it "by no means a sample of the march of progress in the film world. The old version had Lon Chaney, who scared you plenty, and the new one has Claude Rains, who somehow doesn't." A review in the Monthly Film Bulletin stated that "rarely has a story so novelettish had such conscientious technical excellence lavished upon it" specifically noting that "it ranks among the screen's highest achievements in sound." The review continued that "The same careful effort-if not the same dazzling success-is apparent in casting, camera work, costuming and the numerous sets."

In modern times, the film has received more positive reviews. Rotten Tomatoes gave this version of Phantom of the Opera an average score of 77%, based on 22 reviews from critics. The site's consensus states: "Though it lives beneath the 1925 version, Claude Rains plays title character well in this landmark color version of the classic tragedy." Diabolique magazine said "the story was reconfigured as a musical more than a horror saga... Once you accept that, this works well on its own terms and Lubin's touch is assured; it looks splendid."

Lon Chaney Jr. was reportedly unhappy that the studio never seriously considered him to play the role made famous by his father, even though he was under contract to them. Chaney reportedly also resented Rains for his portrayal.

== Cancelled sequel: The Climax ==
Following the success of Phantom of the Opera, Universal announced that a sequel would be made, titled The Climax. Nelson Eddy and Susanna Foster were to return, along with Claude Rains as the Phantom, most likely meaning that his character survived the cave-in at the finale of the first film. The sequel, however, was cancelled due to story troubles and problems concerning the availability of Claude Rains. Universal reworked the film completely, so it is not related to Phantom of the Opera; Foster stars in the film, alongside the original choice for the Phantom, Boris Karloff.

== Awards ==
The film was nominated for four Oscars, becoming the only film in the studio's horror franchise to be nominated. It ultimately won in two categories at the 16th Academy Awards ceremony:

- Art Direction (Color) (John B. Goodman, Alexander Golitzen, Russell A. Gausman and Ira S. Webb) (Won)
- Cinematography (Color) (Hal Mohr and W. Howard Greene) (Won)
- Music (Scoring of a Musical Picture) (Edward Ward) (Nominated)
- Sound Recording (Bernard B. Brown) (Nominated)
