= Fragonard =

Fragonard may refer to:

== Surname ==
- Alexandre-Évariste Fragonard (1780–1850), French painter, son of Jean-Honoré and Marie-Anne Fragonard
- Antonin Fragonard (1857–1887), French sculptor, grandson of Jean-Honoré Fragonard
- Honoré Fragonard (1732–1799), French anatomist, cousin of Jean-Honoré Fragonard
- Jean-Honoré Fragonard (1732–1806), renowned French rococo painter
- Marie-Anne Fragonard née Gérard (1745–1823), French painter and miniaturist, wife of Jean-Honoré Fragonard
- Théophile Fragonard (1806–1876), French painter and illustrator, elder son of Alexandre-Évariste Fragonard

== Astronomy ==
- 8235 Fragonard, a main-belt asteroid also known as 2096 P-L

== Companies ==
- Fragonard, a perfume house based in Grasse, France

== Museums ==
- Fragonard Musée du Parfum, a museum of perfume in Paris, France, owned by the Fragonard company
- Musée Fragonard d'Alfort, a museum of anatomical oddities in Maisons-Alfort, France, named after Honoré Fragonard
