= Any Way the Wind Blows (1958 song) =

"Any Way The Wind Blows" is a popular song.

The music was written by Joseph Hooven and Marilyn Hooven, the lyrics by William D. "By" Dunham. The song was published in 1958.

The best-known version was recorded by Doris Day with the Frank DeVol Orchestra, on January 12, 1959, and released by Columbia Records as catalog number 41569.
