= Yvonne De Carlo Sings =

Studio album by Yvonne De Carlo
- Released: 1957
- Genre: Pop; blues
- Label: Masterseal (Remington)

Yvonne De Carlo Sings is a studio album by Canadian-American actress and singer Yvonne De Carlo, released in 1957 by the Remington subsidiary label Masterseal Records. It features an orchestra conducted by film composer John Williams, who was credited as John Towner.

== Background ==
In June 1957, Billboard announced that Remington Records would release film star Yvonne De Carlo's first LP record, an album of blues songs. Although it was her first album, this was not her first commercial recording. In 1951, Columbia Records released a 78 rpm single with her two songs from Hotel Sahara, "I Love a Man" and "Say Goodbye". In 1955, she sang "Take It or Leave It" in Flame of the Islands, which was arranger Nelson Riddle's first film work. Riddle encouraged her to become a recording artist and made sure Capitol Records recorded the song, which was released as a 45 rpm single with "Three Little Stars" on the B-side.

== Recording and release ==
According to the liner notes, De Carlo chose the songs. She had finished her role in Band of Angels (1957) and was pregnant with her second child by the time she recorded the album. "I had some difficulty breathing properly, being eight months pregnant, but it wasn't noticeable on the recording," she remembered in her autobiography. She was pleased with the results and later wrote that the album "turned out very well."

The album's release was planned to coincide with the release of her film Band of Angels, which was mentioned in the liner notes.

== Critical reception ==
Professional ratings
Review scores
Source	Rating
AllMusic	2.5/5 stars

Bruce Eder of AllMusic described the album as "decidedly uneven, though ultimately not unpleasant". He thought that "End of a Love Affair", "In the Blue of Evening", and "I Got It Bad" showcase Williams' arrangements more effectively than De Carlo's voice. However, he raved about her performance on the other tracks. With "Am I Blue?", he wrote, De Carlo "comes to life as a singer". He also admired her "finely nuanced singing" on "Little Girl Blue" and "Blue Moon" and believed that she "finds even greater inspiration" in "But Not for Me" and "Mood Indigo". Impressed with her "absolutely fresh" version of "My Blue Heaven", Eder noticed her "hard, dark performance" on "One for My Baby", which was "matched perfectly by Williams' understated accompaniment."

== Track listing ==
=== Side one ===
1. "End of a Love Affair" (Edward Redding)
2. "In the Blue of Evening" (Tom Adair, Al D'Artega)
3. "I Got It Bad" (Paul Francis Webster, Duke Ellington)
4. "Am I Blue?" (Grant Clarke, Harry Akst)
5. "Little Girl Blue" (Richard Rodgers, Lorenz Hart)

=== Side two ===
1. "Blue Moon" (Richard Rodgers, Lorenz Hart)
2. "But Not for Me" (George Gershwin, Ira Gershwin)
3. "My Blue Heaven" (George A. Whiting, Walter Donaldson)
4. "Mood Indigo" (Duke Ellington, Irving Mills, Barney Bigard)
5. "One for My Baby" (Johnny Mercer, Harold Arlen)
