= Band of Angels (disambiguation) =

Band of Angels is the 1957 film adaptation of the novel.

Band of Angels may also refer to:

- Band of Angels (investors)
- Band of Angels (novel), 1955 novel by Robert Penn Warren
- "Band of Angels" (Touched by an Angel), 2001
- A Band of Angels, a 1960s British band
- Band of Angels, a band project formed by Elliot Easton and Danny Malone
- Band of Angels, an all-female band who sang "He's Not There"
- Band of Angels, 2005 novel by Witi Ihimaera

== See also ==
- Angel Band (disambiguation)
