= Robert Kendall (actor) =

American actor, writer, and teacher

- Born: Arthur Robert Kendall; June 26, 1927; Stephenson, Michigan, U.S.
- Died: November 12, 2009 (aged 82); Seattle, Washington, U.S.

Robert Kendall (June 26, 1927 – November 12, 2009) was an American actor, writer and teacher.

Kendall was born Arthur Robert Kendall in Stephenson, Michigan in 1927, and moved to Battle Creek as a child. In 1945, he won a "Hollywood at Your Door" talent contest at the W.K. Kellogg Auditorium, and headed to Hollywood to take up the prize of a screen test. Upon his arrival, Kendall was told the company who had sponsored the contest had gone bankrupt and was asked for a loan. He returned to the YMCA where he was staying to discover that his clothes had been stolen. Undeterred, he took work as a waiter in a drive-in restaurant until he was noticed by Sylvia Sidney's talent agent Christopher Hofeld, and invited to try out for some roles at the Universal Studios lot.

Kendall auditioned for Universal and was given the small role of Hassan in the 1947 musical Song of Scheherazade starring Yvonne De Carlo and Jean-Pierre Aumont, and the next year appeared in Casbah, also starring De Carlo, alongside Tony Martin. During the 1950s, he played gangster Baby Face Nelson in several installments of the Gang Busters TV serial. He also played him in the 1960 film Ma Barker's Killer Brood.

== Selected filmography ==
- The Women of Pitcairn Island (1956)
