= Serge Rubinstein =

Russian-American businessman (1897–1955)

Serge Rubinstein (January 7, 1897[?]May 18, 1908 – January 27, 1955) was a stock and currency manipulator, a playboy, Café society denizen, convicted draft-evader and unsolved murder victim.

== Early life ==
Serge Rubinstein was born in St. Petersburg, Russia, to Dmitri and Stella Rubinstein. His father was a money lender to the Czar and a financial adviser to Grigory Rasputin. The family fled Russia during the Russian Revolution, going to Sweden, Austria, and France. Serge finally settled in England, where he graduated from Cambridge University with a degree in economics.

== Business dealings ==
Rubinstein joined the Banque Franco-Asiatique in Paris and by 1932 was running the bank. He was accused of manipulating the French franc by short selling and was expelled from France by Pierre Laval in 1935.

Rubinstein entered the United States in 1938 on a phony Portuguese passport that he had purchased for $2000. The passport was under the name of Serge Manuel Rubinstein de Rovello. He said he was the illegitimate son of a Russian father and Portuguese mother (Rubinstein's brother Andre would later sue Serge on behalf of their mother for defamation of character because of this claim). He had stock dealings in Brooklyn-Manhattan Transit Corporation and Postal Telegraph during 1939 and 1940 which earned him a substantial sum. His political contributions gained him a dinner at the White House with Eleanor Roosevelt.

The British company Chosen Corporation, Ltd. owned three gold mines in Korea. One of its directors, Martin Coles Harman, was convicted of misappropriating funds from the company and its stock price fell. Rubinstein bought stock in the company and gained control. He sold the mines to a Japanese company for the Japanese yen equivalent of $1.7 million, keeping the money for himself. Because Japan had restrictions on the exportation of its currency, Rubinstein smuggled Japanese yen valued at $1.2 million out of Japan. Rubinstein was sued in 1941 in New York by other Chosen Corp. shareholders for $5.9 million, with the suit being settled out of court in 1946 for $2 million.

== Draft evasion and deportation ==
Rubinstein made extensive attempts to avoid the draft during World War II. He claimed that he was the sole support for seven dependents, with only a relatively low income (he had married in 1941 to Laurette Kilbourne and they had two children, Alexandria and Dianna). He also claimed that he worked for vital defense industries. Later, he claimed as a Portuguese citizen from a neutral country that he could not serve in the United States armed forces.

He was indicted for lying about his income to the draft board, when he claimed he only earned $11,000 in 1940 but actually earned $337,000. He was convicted as a draft evader and served two years in the federal penitentiary in Lewisburg, Pennsylvania, from 1947 to 1949. His wife divorced him in 1949 while in prison, claiming cruelty. After the divorce and his release from prison Rubinstein became noted for his social life, being seen with numerous women at fancy nightclubs.

The United States government had previously initiated deportation hearings for Rubinstein, as he had illegally entered the country with a forged Portuguese passport. However, using a battery of lawyers, as well as political connections, he was able to successfully contest those attempts to deport him.

== Postwar business dealings ==
Rubinstein was indicted in 1949 on charges of stock fraud, mail fraud, and violation of the Securities Act in connection with a $3.5 million gain in stock of the Panhandle Producing and Refining Company. He was acquitted in 1951. Rubinstein was also sued by his sister-in-law in 1951, claiming that he cheated his late brother Andre out of $1.5 million in the Chosen Corporation swindle, but she lost the suit.

In 1954, Rubinstein was sued by Blair Holdings for $5 million, alleging conspiracy to defraud. Also in 1954, three men, including Emanuel Lester, were arrested for trying to extort $535,000 from Rubinstein. Lester claimed that he was just trying to collect a debt, and had filed a $750,000 lawsuit against Rubinstein.

Rubinstein said he invested in companies whose liquidation values exceeded the stock value. Critics said that Rubinstein would gain control of a company, then exchange its assets for shares in a sham company, all through a complicated series of transactions, and then dissolve the sham company.

== Death ==
In the early morning of January 27, 1955, Rubinstein returned from a dinner at Nino's La Rue supper club with Estelle Gardner to his six-story Fifth Avenue mansion. She left about fifteen minutes later at 1:45 am.

At 8:30 am, Rubinstein's butler, William Morter, found the body dressed in silk pajamas in the third floor bedroom. Rubinstein's hands and feet were tied with venetian blind cords and his mouth was covered with adhesive tape. The coroner found that he had died of manual strangulation.

An initial force of 50 detectives was assigned to the murder. There was no sign of a forced entry. The room had been ransacked, but the police were unable to determine if anything was missing. The estimated time of death was 3AM.

Rubinstein's mother and an aunt lived at the home on the top floors and claimed that they had seen a mysterious "girl [dressed] in brown" on the stairway at about 1 am after hearing quarreling. However, this was before Rubinstein had arrived home, and police thought they were confused about the time and had seen an ambulance attendant.

Another thing complicating the investigation was that Rubinstein had given keys to the house to numerous girlfriends and business associates. The murder generated significant interest by the public and the media because of Rubinstein's notoriety.

Serge Rubinstein left a will and bequeathed a thousand dollars a month to his mother and five hundred a month to each of his two daughters, ten thousand dollars to his personal valet, his former Parisian secretary Mary Payne, and to Betty Reed, one of his protégés.

There were numerous theories about the murder, including a botched kidnap attempt, involvement of organized crime, revenge by a jilted lover, and revenge by financial victims. A business associate of Rubinstein, Stanley T. Stanley, said he believed it was a "mob job - a syndicate job." One reporter famously quipped that the police had "narrowed the list of suspects down to 10,000." The case was never solved. A theory denounced by an English investigator, Sir Perey Sillitoe, acting on behalf of the diamond trust, would have revealed to the American authorities that Serge Rubinstein had embezzled a large stock of diamonds purchased with the Russian government's money and part of its capital. For these reasons, two Russian agents were reportedly tasked with liquidating him.

At his funeral, rabbi Dr. Julius Mark of Temple Emanu-El made this assessment of Rubinstein's life:

The word 'paradox' best describes the strangely complex, ambiguous and unquestioned psychopathic personality of Serge Rubinstein. He possessed a brilliant mind but was utterly lacking in wisdom. He had a genius for acquiring wealth, yet never learned that money is a good servant but a harsh master. He wanted friends and never had them, since he never seemed to realize that to have friends one must be a friend. He wanted love, but never knew that love must be earned, and cannot be bought. He declared that America was the finest of all countries, yet stubbornly scorned those who pleaded with him to answer America's call to service.

These remarks generated some controversy but were defended by other clergy. His estate assets totaled $1,281,668, far less than estimates of up to $10,000,000 when he was alive. Rubinstein's murder was rated as one of the biggest news stories in 1955 by the United Press.

== In popular culture ==
The 1956 film Death of a Scoundrel, starring George Sanders, Yvonne DeCarlo, and Zsa-Zsa Gabor, was loosely based on Rubinstein's life. The movie's tag line was "Men, Women... he used them, ruined them on his fantastic march to self-destruction."

== See also ==
- List of unsolved murders (1900–1979)

== Books ==
- Great Unsolved Crimes by Louis Solomon, Scholastic Publishers, c. 1976.
- Who Killed The Man Everyone Hated? by Ellery Queen Family magazine in Herald-Journal June 11, 1961 (One of Ellery Queen's True Crime series.)
- "Final Judgment - Death of a Scoundrel". New York Daily News. December 6, 2000.
- Rubinstein Finds Trouble in the Land of Promise Life magazine May 13, 1946
