= Band of Angels =

1957 film by Raoul Walsh

- Theatrical release poster
- Directed by: Raoul Walsh
- Written by: John Twist; Ivan Goff; Ben Roberts
- Based on: Band of Angels by Robert Penn Warren
- Starring: Clark Gable; Yvonne De Carlo; Sidney Poitier; Efrem Zimbalist Jr.
- Cinematography: Lucien Ballard
- Edited by: Folmar Blangsted
- Music by: Max Steiner
- Production company: Warner Bros.
- Distributed by: Warner Bros.
- Release date: August 3, 1957
- Running time: 127 minutes
- Country: United States
- Language: English
- Box office: $2.5 million (US)

Band of Angels is a 1957 American drama film set in the American South before and during the American Civil War, based on the 1955 novel of the same title by Robert Penn Warren. It was directed by Raoul Walsh and stars Clark Gable, Yvonne De Carlo and Sidney Poitier.

== Plot ==
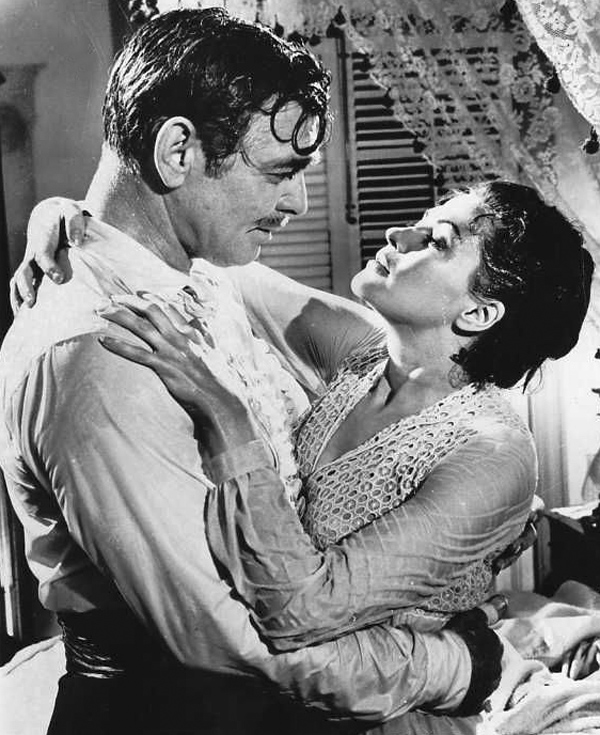
Clark Gable and Yvonne De Carlo in Band of Angels

Amantha Starr is the privileged daughter of a Kentucky plantation owner. However, after he dies, a shocking secret is revealed: Unbeknownst to Amantha, her mother had been one of her father's black slaves. Legally now property, she is taken by a slave trader to New Orleans to be sold. On the riverboat ride there, he makes it clear that he intends to rape her, but desists when she tries to hang herself; as a beautiful, cultured young woman who can pass for white, she is far too valuable to risk losing.

Amantha is put up for auction. When she is callously inspected by a coarse potential buyer, she is rescued from further humiliation by Hamish Bond, who outbids the cad, paying an exorbitant price for her. Expecting the worst, Amantha is surprised to be treated as a lady, not a slave, by her new owner. At his city mansion, she meets his key slaves, his housekeeper (and former lover) Michele and his conflicted right-hand-man Rau-Ru. Rau-Ru is grateful for the kindness, education and trust Hamish has bestowed on him, but hates him anyway because his kindness is a more insidious method of keeping him enslaved than overt cruelty would be. Michele tries to help Amantha escape, but Rau-Ru has been watching her for Hamish and brings her back to the mansion.

During a storm, Amantha and Hamish give in to their mutual passion. He takes his household to his plantation in the country, but arranges for her to continue on the riverboat to freedom in Cincinnati. At the last minute, she gets off the boat and runs to be with him. Their affair continues; when he goes away for a while, a neighbouring planter, Charles de Marigny tries to rape her. Hearing her screams, Rau-Ru comes to her aid and knocks Charles unconscious. Knowing that he will certainly face execution for daring to attack a white man, Rau-Ru is left with no choice but to run away. As he does so, he blames Hamish for instilling in him the pride and dignity that led him to stand up to Charles.

Hamish tells Amantha that they cannot marry, not because of her African blood, but because he is unworthy of her. He was a slaver who joined with an evil local leader to destroy villages in Africa and enslave their inhabitants with atrocities. He does not say why he repented and became a planter kind to his slaves. She is repelled, and goes back to New Orleans to become a music teacher, passing for white.

The Civil War begins, and Rau-Ru has joined a black regiment in the Union Army, a group Hamish sarcastically calls a "Band of Angels". The Union Army reaches New Orleans and occupies it. Union Lieutenant Ethan Sears rescues Amantha from some of his own soldiers who were sexually harassing her. The soldiers felt justified in carrying out General Butler's order equating patriotic Confederate women to prostitutes. Ethan falls in love and courts her. Ethan's commanding officer, Captain Seth Parton (Rex Reason), was formerly an idealistic abolitionist divinity student and preacher, who had known Amantha when she was schooled in Cincinnati. Parton now knows her circumstances, takes her away from Ethan at a dance and eventually propositions her and threatens her with exposure. All this causes her to affirm that Hamish is the only man she loves, and she flees New Orleans to get back to him.

Meanwhile, Hamish has joined with another planter in burning their fields of cotton to keep them from the Union; the other man is caught and hanged, and Hamish flees to his other house in the swamp. Rau-Ru, now a Union sergeant, uses his knowledge from his days of slavery to track Hamish down and arrest him. Hamish then reveals that he stopped being a slaver because, in a terrible raid on a village, an African woman who had been his lover was killed and he fought his own accomplices to rescue her baby. That baby grew up to be Rau-Ru. Moved by this, Rau-Ru secretly gives him the keys to his handcuffs so that when two white Union soldiers take him away, he can overpower them and escape while Rau-Ru remains unsuspected. An old seafaring friend of Hamish is waiting in his ship to rescue him, and Rau-Ru guides Amantha to the shore so that Hamish and Amantha can escape together.

== Cast ==
=== Main ===
- Clark Gable as Hamish Bond
- Yvonne De Carlo as Amantha Starr
- Sidney Poitier as Rau-Ru Ponce de Leon
- Efrem Zimbalist Jr. as Lieutenant Ethan Sears, who falls in love with Amantha, believing her to be white
- Rex Reason as Captain Seth Parton, an old friend from her past
- Patric Knowles as Charles de Marigny, a neighboring plantation owner
- Torin Thatcher as Captain Canavan, Bond's seafaring friend from his past
- Andrea King as Miss Idell
- Ray Teal as Mr. Calloway

=== Supporting ===
- Russell Evans as Jimmee, Bond's steward
- Carolle Drake as Michele
- Raymond Bailey as Mr. Stuart, a plantation owner
- Tommie Moore as Dollie, Bond's house servant

=== Uncredited ===
- Roy Barcroft as Gillespie
- Larry J. Blake as Auctioneer
- X Brands as Officer
- Robert Carson as Bidder
- Robert Clarke as Auction Participant
- Noreen Corcoran as Young Manty
- Ann Doran as Mrs. Morton
- Harry Fleer as Aide
- William Forrest as Aaron Starr
- Carl Harbaugh as Seaman
- William Hudson as Officer
- Maurice Marsac as Auction Participant
- Ewing Mitchell as Old Gentleman
- Juanita Moore as Budge
- William Schallert as Union Lieutenant
- Bob Steele as Union Private
- Madame Sul-Te-Wan as Flower Vendor
- Charles Victor as Officer
- Dan White as Trader
- Jack Williams as Runaway

== Original novel ==
Robert Penn Warren's novel of the same name was published in 1955. He had been inspired to write it by a historical event he came across while researching his novel All the King's Men. It was his first novel in five years. The New York Times called it "a readable and dramatic combination of flamboyant melodrama and thoughtful reflection about moral issues and psychological factors." The book became a best seller.

== Production ==
=== Development ===
In September 1955 Warren sold the film rights to Warner Bros. Pictures for $200,000 (~$1.82 million in 2024). Frank Rosenberg was assigned to produce and Susan Hayward came close to starring. In August 1956 Warners put the film on its production schedule for the following year. That month Frank Rosenberg left the studio and Raoul Walsh agreed to direct the film under a new contract he had signed with Warners.

In November 1956 Clark Gable signed to play the lead. Ava Gardner had been discussed for the female lead but in December Yvonne De Carlo was signed, on the basis of her recent performances in The Ten Commandments and Death of a Scoundrel.

=== Filming ===
Location filming began January 1957 in Baton Rouge, Louisiana. Sidney Poitier joined the film in February.

== Critical response ==
The film received largely negative critical reviews, many of them comparing it unfavourably to Gable's earlier film Gone with the Wind. Bosley Crowther wrote in The New York Times that "all we get is flamboyant melodrama in big, juicy, Warner-colored blobs, with nary a thoughtful reflection at any point in the vast, romantic scene." Robyn Karney gave the film a two-star review in Radio Times, insisting that "this utter tosh strains credibility to the limit and has little to recommend it". Emanuel Levy wrote in 2011, "this entertaining melodrama, directed by Raoul Walsh, bears some thematic resemblance to 'Gone With the Wind', in dealing with issues of race and miscegenation, set against the backdrop of the Civil War."

== See also ==
- List of films featuring slavery
- List of American films of 1957
- Imitation of Life, a 1933 novel by Fannie Hurst
  - Imitation of Life, a 1934 film adaptation
  - Imitation of Life, a 1959 film adaptation
- The Human Stain, a 2000 novel by Philip Roth
  - The Human Stain, a 2003 film adaptation
