= Angel Band =

Angel Band may refer to:

- "Angel Band" (song), a 19th-century song
- Angel Band (album), a 1987 album by Emmylou Harris

== See also ==
- Angel (disambiguation) § Groups
- Band of Angels (disambiguation)
