= The Women of Pitcairn Island =

1956 film by Jean Yarbrough

- Theatrical release poster
- Directed by: Jean Yarbrough
- Written by: Aubrey Wisberg
- Produced by: Aubrey Wisberg; Jean Yarbrough
- Starring: Lynn Bari; John Smith; Sue England
- Cinematography: Harry Neumann
- Edited by: William Austin
- Music by: Paul Dunlap
- Production company: Regal Films
- Distributed by: 20th Century Fox
- Release date: December 1956
- Running time: 72 minutes
- Country: United States
- Language: English

The Women of Pitcairn Island is a 1956 American adventure drama film directed by Jean Yarbrough and starring Lynn Bari, John Smith and Sue England. It was produced by Robert L. Lippert Regal Films for distribution by 20th Century Fox. The film's sets were designed by the art director Dave Milton.

== Plot ==
Nearly twenty years after the Bounty mutineers landed on Pitcairn Island, the last survivor has died leaving only their local-born widows and children. Tensions arise on the island when a fresh load of shipwrecked sailors arrive.

== Cast ==
- James Craig as Capt. Jeb Page
- Lynn Bari as Queen Maimiti Christian
- John Smith as Thursday October Christian
- Sue England as Nana'i Young
- Arleen Whelan as Hutia
- Harry Lauter as Ben Fish
- Henry Rowland as Muskie
- Pierce Lyden as Dan Scruggs
- Paul Sorensen as Sam Allard
- Rico Alaniz as The Spanisher
- John Stevens as Charles Quintal, island boy
- Tim Johnson as John Martin
- Carol Thurston as Balhadi
- Sonia Sorel as Taharua Young
- Lorna Thayer as Moa'tua, weeping woman
- Michael Miller as Tom, captive boy
- Richard Devin as Niahiti, captive boy
- House Peters Jr. as Coggins, sailor hiding jewels
- Carol Richards as Title Theme Singer (voice)
- Charlita as Island Woman
- Milicent Patrick as Island Woman
- Roxanne Reed as Island Woman
- Joel Collins as Island Boy
- James Westmoreland as Island Boy
- Robert Cabal as Island Boy
- Robert Kendall as Island Boy

== Production ==
Filming started in August 1956 in Paramount's Sunset Studios.

== See also ==
- List of American films of 1956

== Bibliography ==
- Ray Hagen & Laura Wagner. Killer Tomatoes: Fifteen Tough Film Dames. McFarland, 2014.
