= The Sword and the Cross =

- La spada e la croce (Italy, 1958); Mary Magdalene (U.S., 1960)
- Directed by: Carlo Ludovico Bragaglia
- Screenplay by: Sandro Continenza
- Story by: Ottavio Poggi
- Produced by: Ottavio Poggi
- Starring: Yvonne De Carlo
- Cinematography: Raffaele Masciocchi
- Edited by: Renato Cinquini
- Music by: Roberto Nicolosi
- Production company: Incir De Paolis Studios
- Distributed by: Amex (U.S.)
- Release date: 1958 (Italy)
- Running time: 105 minutes
- Country: Italy
- Languages: English; Italian

The Sword and the Cross (Italian: La spada e la croce) is a 1958 Italian religious drama film directed by Carlo Ludovico Bragaglia and starring Yvonne De Carlo as Mary Magdalene. Shot in English and later dubbed in Italian, the film was released in the United States in 1960 as Mary Magdalene.

== Cast ==
- Yvonne De Carlo as Mary Magdalene
- Jorge Mistral as Gaius Marcellus
- Rossana Podestà as Martha
- Massimo Serato as Anan
- Andrea Aureli as Barabbas
- Mario Girotti as Lazarus
- Nando Tamberlani as Caiaphas
- Philippe Hersent as Pontius Pilate
- Rossana Rory as Claudia

== Production ==
De Carlo was signed for the film in May 1958. The film's director, Carlo Ludovico Bragaglia, later remembered that the "producer, Ottavio Poggi, had sent the provisional script to America, so Yvonne De Carlo could read it and decide on her participation in the film. She read it and got very excited, agreeing to play the role of Magdalene."

Edgar G. Ulmer was reportedly preparing another project on Magdalene with Ottavio Poggi.

De Carlo left for Rome in July 1958. Filming took place in Rome in August through to November 1958 at Cinecettà Studios. A working title for the film was The Great Sinner.

== Release ==
Although the film was shot under the English title The Sword and the Cross, another Italian film with that name (Le schiave di Cartagine aka Slaves of Carthage) starring Gianna Maria Canale and Jorge Mistral, was released un the US in 1960.

=== Critical reception ===
The Los Angeles Times called the film "sluggish".

Gary Allen Smith, in his book Epic Films: Casts, Credits and Commentary on More Than 350 Historical Spectacle Movies, described the film as "above average."
