= Song of Scheherazade =

1947 film by Walter Reisch

- 1947 Theatrical Poster
- Directed by: Walter Reisch
- Written by: Walter Reisch
- Produced by: Edward Kaufman; Edward Dodds
- Starring: Yvonne De Carlo; Jean-Pierre Aumont; Eve Arden; Brian Donlevy; Charles Kullman (as Charles Kullmann); Elena Verdugo; Phillip Reed; John Qualen; George Dolenz
- Cinematography: Hal Mohr; William V. Skall
- Edited by: Frank Gross
- Music by: Nikolai Rimsky-Korsakov; Miklós Rózsa
- Production company: Universal Pictures
- Distributed by: Universal Pictures
- Release dates: February 26, 1947 (New York City); March 1947 (United States)
- Running time: 105 minutes
- Country: United States
- Language: English
- Box office: $2.1 million (US rentals); 2,802,722 admissions (France)

Song of Scheherazade is a 1947 American musical film directed by Walter Reisch. It tells the story of an imaginary episode in the life of the Russian composer Nikolai Rimsky-Korsakov (Jean-Pierre Aumont), in 1865, when he was a young naval officer on shore leave in Morocco. It also features Yvonne De Carlo as a Spanish dancer named Cara de Talavera, Eve Arden as her mother, and Brian Donlevy as the ship's captain. Charles Kullman (credited as Charles Kullmann), a tenor with the Metropolitan Opera, plays the ship's doctor, Klin, who sings two of Rimsky-Korsakov's melodies.

== Plot ==
Rimsky-Korsakov, a midshipman in the Imperial Russian Navy, secretly yearns to be a composer, but naval regulations prevent him from doing so. He uses a stopover in Tangiers to work on his next composition, Scheherazade (which is actually a symphonic suite, but in the film is a ballet), with the tacit support of his captain. There, he meets Cara de Talavera and her mother, and romantic events and complications ensue. He has to leave to return home to Russia, where his ballet is staged, but Cara unexpectedly turns up as one of the dancers, and they are reunited.

== Cast ==
- Jean-Pierre Aumont – Nikolai Rimsky-Korsakov
- Yvonne De Carlo – Cara de Talavera
- Eve Arden – Madame de Talavera
- Brian Donlevy – Captain Vladimir Grigorovich
- Charles Kullman – Dr Klin (as Charles Kullmann)
- Elena Verdugo – Fioretta
- Phillip Reed – Prince Mischetsky
- John Qualen – Lorenzo
- George Dolenz – Pierre, the head waiter
- Terry Kilburn – Midshipman Lorin
- William Ching – Midshipman
- Molio Sheron – Basso
- Robert Kendall – Hassan (uncredited)
- Chester Conklin – sailor (uncredited)

== Production ==
The entry of the United States into World War II meant they were allies of the Soviet Union, and films with Russian themes became fashionable in Hollywood. In April 1942 it was announced that producers S.P. Eagle and Boris Morros, who had just made Tales of Manhattan (1942) for 20th Century Fox, had acquired the film rights to the music of Rimsky-Korsakoff through the Russian government. Walter Reisch would write the story which would cover three days the composer spent on leave in 1860 while touring the world on a Russian naval ship, where he wrote "The Scheherazade Suite". It was going to be called Russian Marines.

Morros and Eagle did not wind up producing the film and rights to the music and script reverted to Reisch. Reisch says Joe Pasternak wanted to buy the property for MGM but Reisch says they would not let him direct. Harry Cohn was interested in the project for Columbia Pictures but Reisch's agent, Charles Feldman, set up the film at Universal.

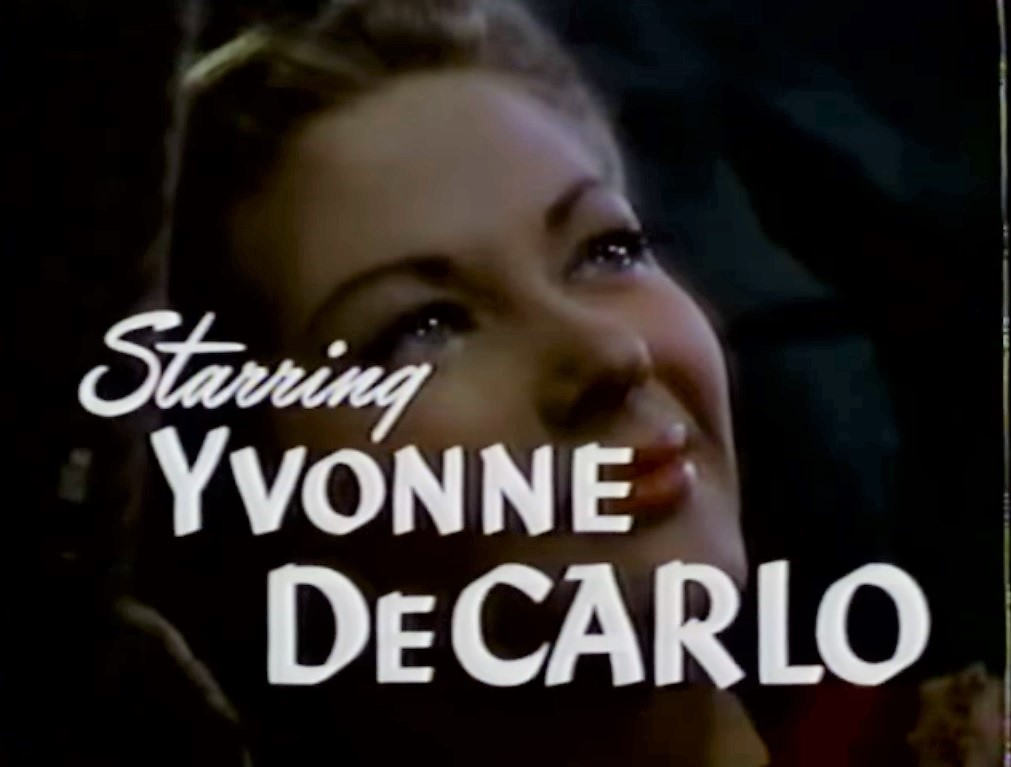
Yvonne De Carlo in the trailer for the film

Yvonne De Carlo says that Reisch was offered Maria Montez and de Carlo for the lead. Reisch says that all but one of his colleagues – including Billy Wilder – recommended Yvonne De Carlo for the lead, except Sam Spiegel (Eagle) who told him, "Don't make a picture with this girl, because, while she may be a star, she's not your type. She's much too—let's say plebeian—in her bearing."

De Carlo's casting was announced in August 1945.

Miklós Rózsa signed to do the music. Jean-Pierre Aumont was borrowed from MGM to play the male lead; de Carlo says that Reisch was not happy with this casting because he had a French accent while the rest of the cast had American accents, but the studio over-ruled him. Filming began 15 January 1946. During filming the title was changed to Shahrazad.

According to Robert Kendall, the actor who played the boy-servant Hassan in this movie, Eve Arden regretted taking on the role of Madame de Talavera, complaining that she was actually too young for the part. And Jean-Pierre Aumont's wife, former Universal Studios film-queen Maria Montez, was often present on the set during her husband's passionate scenes with Yvonne De Carlo.

== Soundtrack and choreography ==
The film contains much colourful music and dancing. The choreography was by Tilly Losch. Rimsky-Korsakov's music was orchestrated by Miklós Rózsa and (uncredited) Eugene Zador. Themes by Rimsky-Korsakov that are used include: "Song of India" from Sadko (sung by Charles Kullman); Flight of the Bumblebee from The Tale of Tsar Saltan; "Hymn to the Sun" from The Golden Cockerel; Capriccio Espagnol, and Scheherazade.

== Release ==
The filmmakers expected censorship problems with Yvonne De Carlo's costumes so submitted them all beforehand for approval. However the censor found issue with Eve Arden's costumes, requiring some of her scenes to be re-shot. The film also took a while to be released because of delays at the Technicolor lab.

=== Reception ===
The film was a success at the box office earning $2.1 million in rentals in North America. According to Reisch, Universal "had an enormous success with" the film "because I succeeded in making the picture very inexpensively." However it also got terrible reviews and Reisch felt it cost him the chance of directing again. He later said:

If you make a picture called Song of Scheherazade, with "Song of India" in it, and the "Caprice Espagnole" and the "Flight of the Bumblebee", all by Rimsky-Korsakov, and if Yvonne De Carlo is the inspiration for all of this, you are leaving yourself wide open for criticism. Today I accept it with a certain sense of humor. But the studio people just didn't believe in my direction [as a consequence], and I never got a picture to direct in Hollywood again.
