= Flame of the Islands =

1956 drama film directed by Edward Ludwig

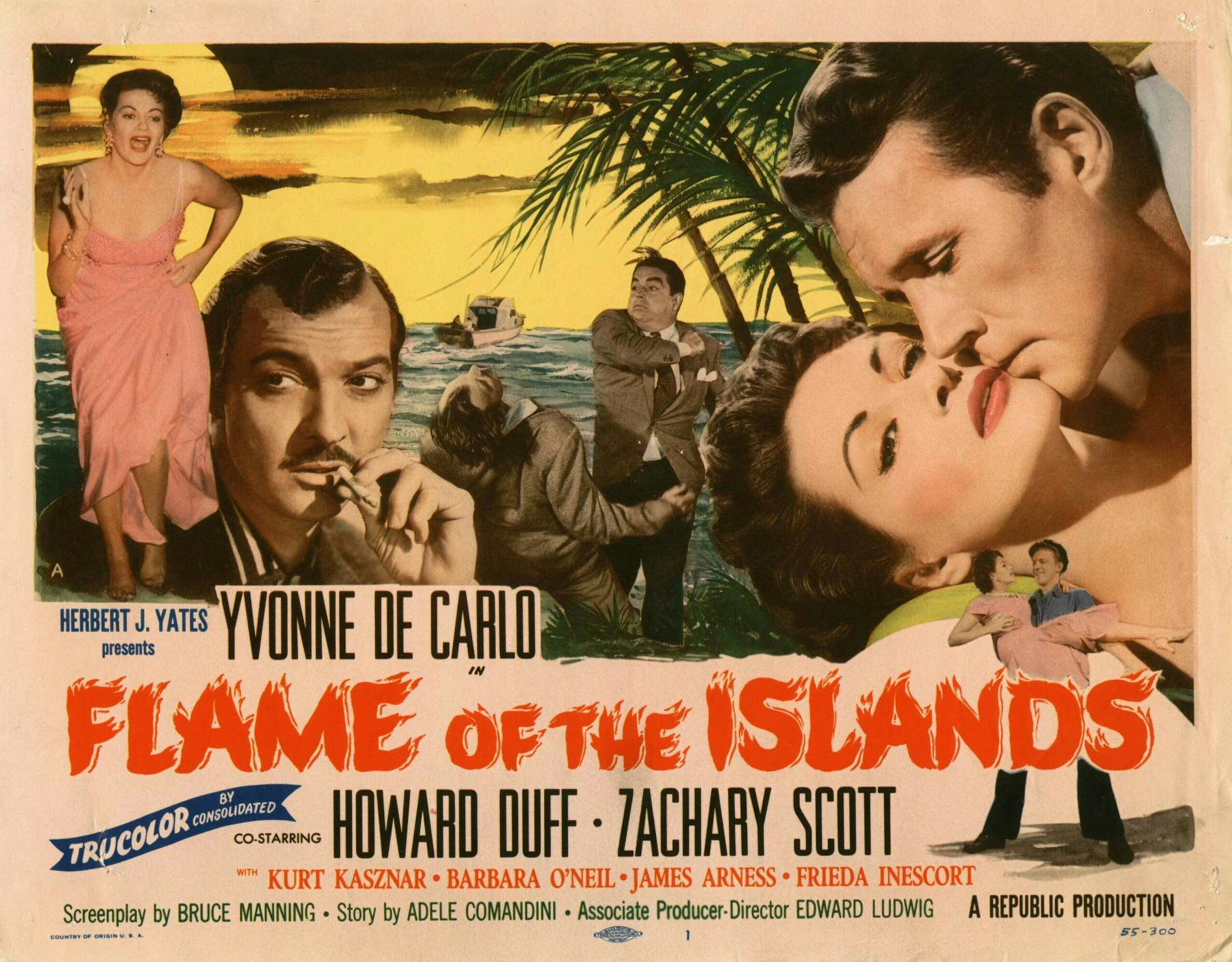
- Directed by: Edward Ludwig
- Screenplay by: Bruce Manning
- Story by: Adele Comandini
- Produced by: Edward Ludwig
- Starring: Yvonne De Carlo; Howard Duff; Zachary Scott
- Cinematography: Bud Thackery
- Edited by: Richard L. Van Enger
- Music by: Nelson Riddle
- Color process: Trucolor
- Production company: Republic Pictures
- Distributed by: Republic Pictures
- Release date: January 6, 1956
- Running time: 90 minutes
- Country: United States
- Language: English

Flame of the Islands is a 1956 American film noir crime film directed by Edward Ludwig and starring Yvonne De Carlo, Howard Duff, and Zachary Scott. Shot in Trucolor, it was produced and distributed by Republic Pictures.

== Plot ==
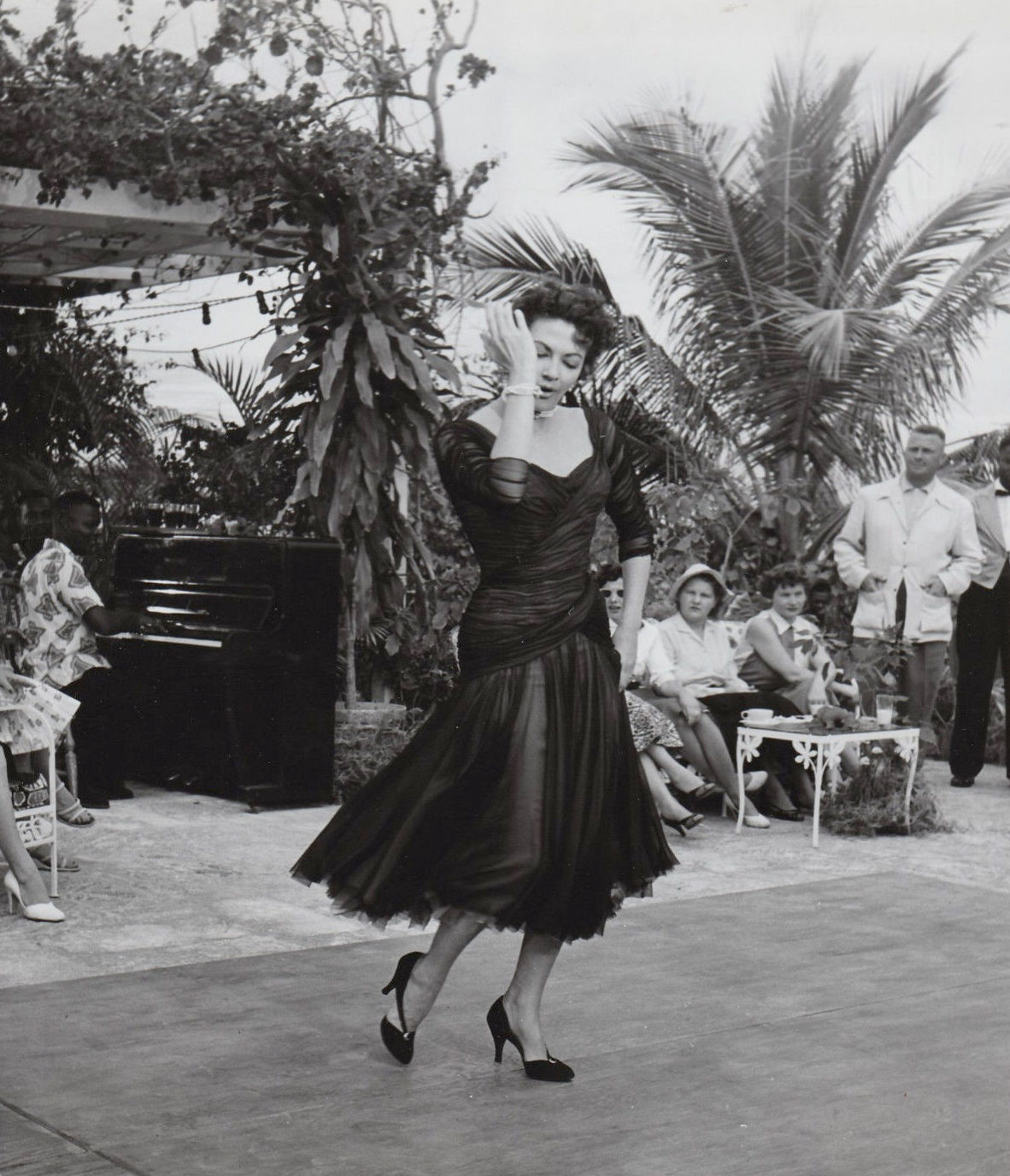
Yvonne De Carlo dancing

In New York City, Rosalind Dee (DeCarlo) is a secretary longing to enter high society. She is rumored of being Carlton Hammond's mistress; he is an older, wealthy man, who dies of a heart attack. Evelyn Hammond, his wife and an invalid, sees her at his funeral. She summons her to the family home and gifts Rosalind $100,000 for making her husband happy. Despite protests, Rosalind takes the money.

Rosalind quits her job, determined to make something of herself. That evening, she goes to a dinner-dance with her friend Wade Evans (Zachary Scott). Gambling-club owner Cyril Mace (Kurt Kasznar) joins their table and tries to talk Wade into investing in his Nassau club. Rosalind is intrigued by Cyril's colorful descriptions of an elite, high society club and casino by the ocean, so she inquires about Cyril's plans with Wade.

The couple flies to Nassau with Cyril as their guide, tour the island and the club, and meet Rev. Kelly Rand (James Arness), who also takes tourists fishing. Rosalind invests $75,000, and Wade invests $20,000.

Cyril meets with his Cuban partners, informing him that they have two American partners, too. They are nervous, but Cyril assures them that he will keep the Americans away, and that they will all make money. Rand takes Rosalind marlin fishing. When she lands one, Rand kisses her "as a prize." On dock, Cyril is waiting with some newly arrived, rich Americans, who have come to admire her catch; he introduces her to them. Playboy Doug Duryea (Howard Duff) is there, too, flustering Rosalind, particularly when he asks if they met on Nassau last year.

At home, Rosalind confides in Wade that, when she was 15, she and Doug were in love; her name was Linda Darcy. She was poor, he was wealthy, and his family separated them. She still loves him, but he does not remember her. She invested in the club because she was sure that Doug would visit, and she is hoping for a second chance. Wade asks her what she will do if Doug does not fall in love with her; Rosalind replies that he will.

The club opens to a full house with Rosalind as hostess and a popular singer/dancer. Doug introduces his mother, Mrs. Charmaine Duryea, to Rosalind; Doug takes Rosalind aside, saying that she's the woman for whom he has been waiting. Charmaine has a heart spasm, caused by excitement at gambling. While recovering, she asks to see Rosalind. Charmaine says she opposes Doug marrying a second time, as he is now her companion. Back in the club, a tipsy Wade informs Doug that Rosalind is really Linda Darcy.

Doug's amazed that Rosalind's Linda, and they embrace joyously. They spend even more time together, causing Cyril to grumble that it is in bad taste of her to spend her time with only one club member. The couple attend Rand's Sunday, beach-side sermon, which Rosalind finds very inspirational.

Doug invites Rosalind to his house for Christmas, over her protests that Charmaine would not like it. Cyril gives her an expensive necklace, and tries to kiss her passionately. Rosalind shoves him away over his protests that she will find Doug's party dull. While taking Rosalind to Doug's house, Rand warns Rosalind away from club, saying that Cyril is not any good. At the Duryea's, Doug tells his mother that Rosalind is actually Linda, and that he loves her; she's horrified. During the party, Doug and Rosalind become engaged. Charmaine nearly faints when her friend informs her, but manages to congratulate them.

Evelyn Hammond arrives, recognizing Rosalind, and Doug says that Evelyn is his god-mother. Evelyn says that she wishes to speak with Rosalind that day, and Rosalind finds Evelyn in a sitting room later. They argue, Evelyn indignant that Rosalind took her money and husband's love and now is after her godson, and Rosalind saying that the family bought her off twice, including when she was young and pregnant, but now she's doing all she can with the means to do it. Evelyn threatens to tell Doug, but Rosalind says it won't matter; he'll choose her. Aghast, Evelyn tells Charmaine that Rosalind was Carlton's lover and promises to tell Doug.

While giving Rand his Christmas presents, Rand kisses Rosalind, impulsively. She tells him she is engaged, but he is forgiven as it is Christmas. He approves of her engagement, as it means she will leave the club. Upon her return, Charmaine has waiting for Rosalind in her suite and asks what Rosalind and Carlton were to each other. Charmaine breaks down, saying that Carlton loved her, but could not leave Evelyn. Rosalind says that they did not love each other or have an affair. Charmaine makes Rosalind promise never to tell Doug about her affair with Carlton, then dies from an attack, despite Rosalind calling for a doctor.

Evelyn tries to tell Doug about Rosalind's past, but he refuses to hear, going to Rosalind's suite. He asks what caused his mother's heart attack. Rosalind tells him that Charmaine was upset that about the rumors that she was Carlton's mistress; she took the Hammond's money as she thinks they owed it to her. She refuses to tell Doug the identity of his godfather's mistress. He leaves in anger, failing to have the "proof" he needs, and Evelyn spreads her rumors. Club members stop attending, due to the scandal.

On the day of the funeral, Rosalind goes to Rand's house and drinks. He arrives at home when she is falling down drunk and sits her in a chair to sober up. That afternoon, she talks with Doug. He has talked with Evelyn, who does not believe Rosalind's story. He is uncertain over whom to believe, but when she refuses to confirm or deny her story, he decides that Rosalind was Carlton's mistress after all. She sends back his engagement ring.

Cyril's Cuban partners are agitated that the club's losing money and summon Rosalind to Cyril's office. Despite her surprise that they exist, she agrees to negotiate. The men offer to buy her out with the expectation that she will leave tomorrow. She says that they could not pay for the type of publicity that she has brought them, so they should open it up to the general public and offer her a written contract for more money; they will all make a fortune. They decide to talk it over, and Rosalind and Cyril walk back to her suite. Cyril then offers Rosalind a deal where she seduces men, takes their money, and they all profit; she laughs at him. He kisses her again, despite her repulsion. Wade walks in, pulling Cyril away, and is beaten by Cyril. Wade collapses, informing her and the partners that Cyril has been using two sets of books to cheat both sets of partners.

His furious partners take Cyril away. Cyril insists their money is in his safe, but pulls out a flare gun instead. He shoots it out the window, alerting the Coast Guard. His partners kill him and kidnap Rosalind, heading to their boat and running into Rand on the beach. Rand fights them, but is overwhelmed and is taken, too. They are kept below-decks, while the partners sail to Cuba. Alerted by the flare, the Coast Guard rushes after their boat and fires on it; Rand sabotages their engine to slow it down. Rosalind and Rand sneak overboard while the partners' boat explodes from shots fired by the Coast Guard. They swim to an island and walk ashore, Rosalind telling him that she wants to stay. They embrace.

== Cast ==
- Yvonne De Carlo as Rosalind Dee
- Howard Duff as Doug Duryea
- Zachary Scott as Wade Evans
- Kurt Kasznar as Cyril Mace
- Barbara O'Neil as Charmaine Duryea
- James Arness as Kelly Rand
- Frieda Inescort as Evelyn Hammond
- Lester Matthews as Gus
- Donald Curtis as Johnny
- Nick Stewart as Nick
- John Pickard as Henchman Parks (uncredited)

== Production ==
The film was based on an unpublished novel by Adele Comandini called Rebel Island. Republic Pictures bought it in January 1954 and assigned Bruce Manning to write the script and Edward Ludwig to direct and produce. Republic, who had been in a production downswing, put the film on its schedule in May 1954. It was part of a slate of six films, the others being Timberjack, Magic Fire, The Admiral Hoskins Story and a film about Texas to be directed by Frank Lloyd.

In January 1955, Yvonne De Carlo, who appeared in Magic Fire, signed to play the lead. Zachary Scott and John Lund were to be her co stars. Eventually Lund dropped out and was replaced by Howard Duff. The film was shot on location in the Bahamas in Trucolor.

== See also ==
- List of American films of 1956
