= Band of Angels (novel) =

Novel by Robert Penn Warren

- First edition cover
- Author: Robert Penn Warren
- Language: English
- Genre: Historical fiction
- Publisher: Random House
- Publication date: 1955
- Publication place: United States
- Media type: Print
- Pages: 376 (Hardcover 1st edition)

Band of Angels is a novel by Robert Penn Warren first published in 1955. The story is narrated in the first person by Amantha Starr, the daughter of a Kentucky plantation owner, whose life is thrown into turmoil when she is sold into slavery to pay her father's debts.

== Plot ==
Amantha Starr grows up on a plantation in Kentucky, with her father, a widower. When her father dies, Amantha discovers that her real mother was one of her father's slaves. She is therefore property belonging to the estate, and she is taken by a slave trader to pay off the deep debts of her father's estate. She is bought in New Orleans by Hamish Bond, a man who, as if defending her honor, violently stops a potential buyer from inspecting her.

At Hamish Bond's plantation, Amantha is allowed to do almost whatever she wants, to her surprise. A slave named Rau-Ru has special authority, running the plantation's day-to-day operations. Amantha finds herself attracted to Hamish, despite her captivity. After Amantha plans to escape, she confronts Hamish about having her watched and followed, and he responds that she can leave and that he will even arrange her travel to the North whenever she desires. That night, a storm breaks her window and causes damage to the house. Amantha awakes, startled, and Hamish carries her from the room, away from the broken window and the howling wind. They have sexual intercourse, in the heat of the moment. Though Amantha sees the encounter as a violation, she does not resist. After the incident, she realizes their mutual attraction, but remains confused about her feelings. Amantha goes to the harbor to sail North, but cannot bring herself to leave, so she returns to live with Hamish.

Months later, a wealthy visitor to the plantation attempts to rape Amantha, but Rau-Ru interrupts and beats him severely. Rau-Ru flees the plantation, knowing that he could be killed for striking a white man. Hamish ashamedly reveals to Amantha that he had been a slave trader for much of his life, not coming from the genteel class to which he now belongs. One of the African children he acquired was Rau-Ru. Hamish officially frees her, telling her to leave.

She meets and marries white Union officer Tobias Sears, but Tobias remains unaware of her ancestry. Tobias leads a black regiment, and he acts righteously amid the temptations and corruption in the final months of the War. Many of his Union colleagues care little about former slaves or the Southern states, only seeking to make money. Tobias praises the courage of one Lieutenant Jones, a black Union soldier. Upon meeting the soldier, Amantha realizes that he is Rau-Ru. He and Amantha have a tense relationship, however. He had deeply resented Hamish's favoritism toward her and now sees Hamish's former kindness toward him as false, merely a way of keeping him enslaved.

When Amantha finally tells Tobias about her mixed race, he does not reject her, but he shows new signs of nervousness, such as nail-biting. Amantha assumes that the agitation is due to her recent revelation, and she runs away amid the post-war chaos in Louisiana. By chance, she meets Rau-Ru. Against his wishes, she follows him, seeing that he and a group of other black men are planning to hang Hamish Bond. When she confronts them, Hamish has a rope around his neck standing on a high place. Hamish sees her and says, "All niggers. Ass deep in niggers," then jumps to his death. When a group of white people arrive, Amantha passes as white, in order to escape, and lies, saying that she was brought there against her will. She returns home to find Tobias unconscious, severely beaten during the riots, unaware that she ever left. She nurses him back to health.

They move and settle in Kansas, living there for years. Tobias falls into depression, abuses alcohol, and is unfaithful to Amantha. She regularly sees an old black beggar who reminds her of Rau-Ru. When the old beggar dies and is buried in an unmarked grave, Amantha is tormented by guilt. A wealthy black man, Mr. Lounberry, comes to town to share his wealth with his estranged father. Tobias helps Lounberry with the required documents and defends him from prejudice in the town. Tobias feels renewed sense of purpose and is giddy afterward when relating the story to Amantha. Though Amantha also struggles with guilt, she realizes that no one can set her free but herself.

== Critical reception ==
Shortly after the novel's release, many critics praised the dramatic elements of the plot but noted that its philosophical elements were less successful. Audrey Weaver of The Chicago Defender, Orville Prescott, and Fanny Butcher were among those who positively described the novel as entertaining and compelling. Prescott called the novel "a readable and dramatic combination of flamboyant melodrama and thoughtful reflection about moral issues and psychological factors," and described it as "thoroughly entertaining." In the Chicago Tribune Magazine of Books, Paul Engle wrote a mostly positive review, stating that while some elements of the plot "strain belief," the whole is rendered in "that wonderfully flexible, imaginative, lyrical, and yet rock solid prose which is Warren's particular genius," making the novel "the unique triumph of 1955 in fiction."

Arthur Mizener reviewed the book in The New York Times, praising Warren's "beautifully disciplined historical imagination" and his construction of a wide variety of complex characters. He wrote, however, that the philosophical elements spread through the story "like a blight." While he noted that mixing in weighty ruminations can be effective, in Band of Angels, they "are carried to extremes, and their constant reiteration makes them seem like an obsession." While readers could imagine Amantha's suffering, he wrote, "we cannot, I think, imagine the wild growth of speculation with which Mr. Warren festoons that suffering." Prescott called the philosophical and reflective parts of the novel "provocative" but "opaque," and wrote that Amantha's narrative voice and her internal thoughts often "seem Mr. Warren's and not hers." Literary critic Leslie Fiedler criticized the novel as far-fetched and emotionally overwrought, "operatic in the worst sense of the word."

== Film adaptation ==
In 1957, a film adaptation was released by Warner Bros., directed by Raoul Walsh and starring Clark Gable, Sidney Poitier, and Yvonne DeCarlo.
