= Death of a Scoundrel =

1956 film by Charles Martin

- Theatrical release poster
- Directed by: Charles Martin
- Screenplay by: Charles Martin
- Produced by: Charles Martin
- Starring: George Sanders; Yvonne De Carlo; Zsa Zsa Gabor
- Cinematography: James Wong Howe
- Edited by: Conrad A. Nervig
- Music by: Max Steiner
- Production company: Charles Martin Productions
- Distributed by: RKO Pictures
- Release date: November 5, 1956 (US)
- Running time: 119 minutes
- Country: United States
- Language: English

Death of a Scoundrel is a 1956 American drama film directed by Charles Martin and starring George Sanders, Yvonne De Carlo, Zsa Zsa Gabor, Victor Jory and Coleen Gray. It was distributed by RKO Pictures. This film and The Falcon's Brother are the only two to feature real-life lookalike brothers George Sanders and Tom Conway, who portray brothers in both pictures. The movie's music is by Max Steiner and the cinematographer is James Wong Howe.

Death of a Scoundrel is a fictionalized adaptation of the life and mysterious death of Serge Rubinstein.

== Plot ==
Czech refugee Clementi Sabourin, missing and believed dead, one day turns up to find that his love Zina is now married to his brother, Gerry. Out of spite, he betrays Gerry to the police. Gerry is killed resisting arrest. A police prefect gives a passport to Sabourin, who sets sail for America.

At the port in New York he sees Bridget Kelly, a woman who makes off with ship passenger Leonard Wilson's wallet. Sabourin makes a romantic play for Kelly, only to steal the wallet when her back is turned. Kelly's estranged husband Chuck pursues and shoots Sabourin in the street. Sabourin eventually escapes by pushing Chuck into the path of an oncoming car.

On a tip from the doctor who removes the bullet, Sabourin invests in a company that manufactures the drug penicillin. He fraudulently uses a $20,000 cashier's check from inside the wallet to purchase the stock. Encountering Mrs. Ryan, the wealthy widow of a prominent businessman, Sabourin earns a considerable sum of money for her as well by tipping her to the stock. Mrs. Ryan writes Sabourin a $20,000 loan, which he uses to cover his forged check from Wilson. His stockbroker, O'Hara, spots the fraud but helps Sabourin in exchange for a share in his profit.

Sabourin uses a financial statement he found in the wallet to blackmail Wilson into selling him his oil company. Sabourin orchestrates a fake oil strike to gain profit, but the scheme fails when oil is really found on the property and the stock soars to $30 a share. Sabourin, O'Hara, Kelly and Sabourin's lawyer Bauman become successful by buying struggling companies, manipulating the price of stock and throwing the companies into receivership.

As he becomes increasingly "successful", Sabourin begins courting various women romantically, including Mrs. Ryan's young secretary, Stephanie North. He invites North to a party and finances her ambition to become an actress. When she rejects his advances, he attempts to thwart her career, but is unsuccessful, as her producer recognizes that North indeed has talent.

Sabourin then courts Edith van Renssalaer, the affluent wife of a wealthy businessman. Sabourin attempts to interfere in her marriage to gain control of her stock and form a new uranium company, but Zina resurfaces one night and reveals that she learned that he was responsible for Gerry's death. He pledges his love to her and remorse for Gerry's death. Sabourin is lying, but Zina believes him. However, after seeing him conspire with Edith, Zina kills herself and writes a note implicating Sabourin. The police arrest him, while Edith abandons him.

As Sabourin's embezzling is also uncovered, the court begins an attempt to deport him to Czechoslovakia. Knowing that the communists will confiscate his money there, Sabourin instructs Kelly to contact his mother. The mother is initially happy to see her son, but refuses his plan to tell the court that Sabourin was born illegitimately in Switzerland and disowns him. Kelly, who has long concealed her love and concern for Sabourin, implores him to return the stolen money.

Sabourin eventually decides to return the money. No sooner does he endorse the stock certificates, O'Hara (who hitherto had qualms concerning their crooked dealings) arrives and confronts him at gunpoint. O'Hara and Bauman intend to let Sabourin be the fall guy and take all the money for themselves. A struggle ensues over O'Hara's gun in which Sabourin manages to kill O'Hara but is himself fatally wounded. While returning home, he sees all of his would-be victims emerging successful as well as a billboard with a Bible verse written on it. (Note: More specifically, Mark 8:36.) He also meets Kelly, and says that he returned the money.

When Sabourin returns home, he pleads with his mother, who refuses to see him. He then calls Kelly, leaving a message saying that he really did love her and begging for forgiveness. He then collapses on the bed and dies.

Kelly later finds the body. She tells the police everything she knows about Sabourin's past to the police and his mother. The latter laments that she did not forgive Sabourin before he died.

== Cast ==
- George Sanders as Clementi Sabourin
- Yvonne De Carlo as Miss Kelly
- Zsa Zsa Gabor as Mrs. Ryan
- Victor Jory as Leonard Wilson
- Nancy Gates as Stephanie North
- Coleen Gray as Edith van Renssalaer
- John Hoyt as O'Hara
- Lisa Ferraday as Zina Monte
- Tom Conway as Gerry Sabourin
- Celia Lovsky as Mrs. Sabourin
- Werner Klemperer as Herbert Bauman
- Justice Watson as Henry

== Production ==
The film was based on an original script by Charles Martin which was inspired by the life and death of Serge Rubenstein. He formed his own company and announced this would be the first of five films.

In June 1955 it was announced Martin had offered the female lead to Corinne Calvet. Martin also sent a copy of the script to Arlene Dahl, Joan Caulfield, Ida Lupino and Constance Bennett.

He wanted Rossano Brazzi to play the male lead. Robert Mitchum and Alec Guinness were other possibilities. Eventually George Sanders agreed to star.

== Reaction ==
"Mr. Sanders and company make Death of a Scoundrel a slick and sometimes fascinating fiction. It only casually tries to probe the hearts and minds of its principals."
