= Remington Records =

American record label

Remington Records was a low budget record label. It existed from 1950 until 1957 and specialized in classical music. The discs suffered from considerable surface noise.

== History ==
The earliest Remington recordings were made in Vienna. They were produced by Marcel Prawy from 1950 till 1953. In 1953 West Berlin became the recording venue outside the United States.

Producer Don Gabor, recording director Laszlo Halasz and engineer Robert Blake made the very first commercial stereophonic tape recordings in the United States in 1953 with Thor Johnson and the Cincinnati Symphony Orchestra. They included Dvořák's Symphony No. 8 (then No. 4) and symphonic and choral works by Sibelius. These stereo recordings were released as mono records in 1954.

Mono and stereo recordings were also made in Berlin with the RIAS (Radio in the American Sector) Symphony Orchestra. The recordings were supervised by Don Gabor and conductor Laszlo Halasz.

Besides the Cincinnati Symphony recordings, other recordings were made in America with various classical artists, including violinist George Enescu, pianist Jorge Bolet, and violinist Ossy Renardy, among others. Some of Remington's mono and stereo tapes were released in the late 1970s on the Varèse-Sarabande label. Producer Tom Null and his technicians applied a different equalization for the new matrices and this resulted in far better pressings and improved sound.

Thor Johnson's recordings for Remington were:

- R-199-168 Dvorak: Symphony No. 4 (8th)
- R-199-182 Prokofiev: Piano Concerto No. 2 with Jorge Bolet, pianist (reissued in 1974 in stereo on Turnabout TV-S 34543)
- R-199-184 Gershwin: Concerto in F with Alec Templeton, pianist
- R-199-185 Ward: Third Symphony; Stein: Three Hassidic Dances.
- R-199-187 Tchaikovsky: Symphony No. 2
- R-199-188 Brant: Concerto for Alto Saxophone, Sigurd Rascher soloist (coupled with Glanville-Hicks: Gymnopedies 1, 2 and 3; Rudhyar: Sinfonietta; performed by the RIAS Symphony Orchestra conducted by Jonel Perlea)
- R-199-191 Sibelius: The Origin of Fire with the Helsinki University Chorus (coupled with Glazunov's Violin Concerto, played by André Gabriel and the RIAS Symphony conducted by Georg Ludwig Jochum)

Don Gabor produced recordings in the 1940s for his Continental label. Best known are the Continental recordings he made with George Enesco of Bach's Sonatas and Partitas. But in the 78 rpm era he recorded several jazz musicians such as Sarah Vaughan, Don Byas, Cozy Cole, and Dizzy Gillespie, as well as popular musicians on Continental. He later reissued most of these recordings on the Remington label and the other labels he had: Masterseal, Plymouth, Merit, Masque, Buckingham, Webster, and Paris.

== See also ==
- List of record labels
