= Yvonne De Carlo =

Canadian-born American actress, dancer and singer (1922–2007)

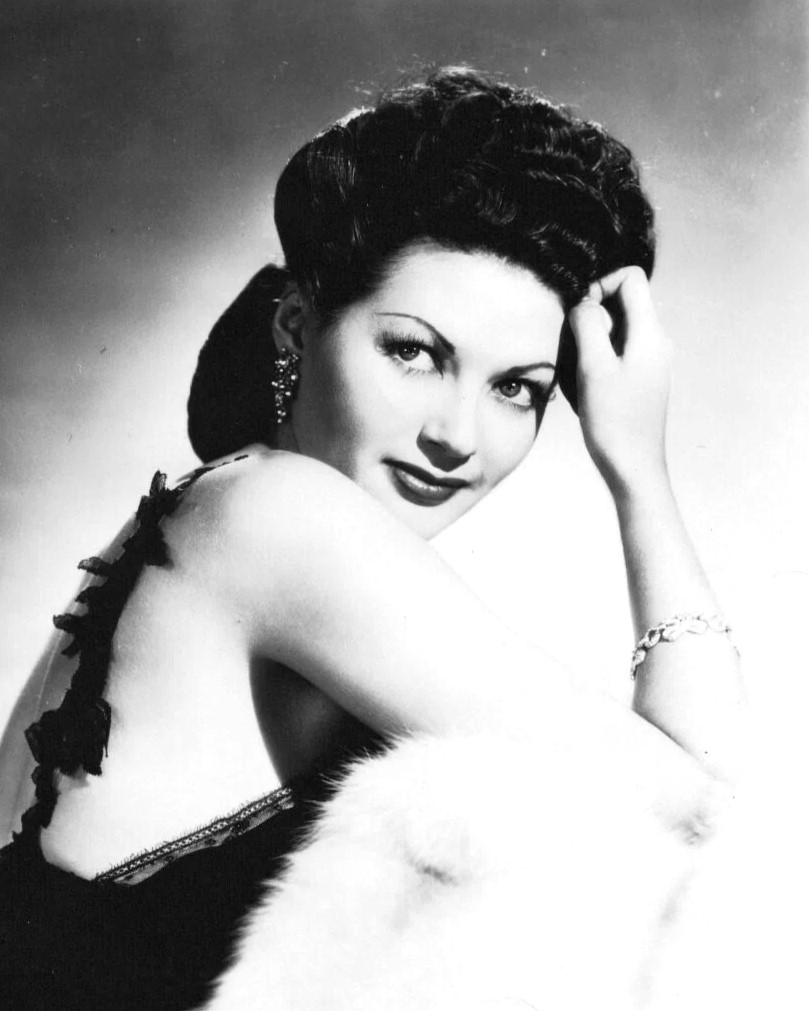
- De Carlo, c. 1945
- Born: Margaret Yvonne Middleton; September 1, 1922; Vancouver, British Columbia, Canada
- Died: January 8, 2007 (aged 84); Los Angeles, California, U.S.
- Occupations: Actress; dancer; singer
- Years active: 1939–1995
- Notable work: Sephora in Cecil B. DeMille's The Ten Commandments (1956)
- Television: The Munsters (1964–1966)
- Spouse: Robert Drew Morgan (m. 1955; div. 1973)
- Children: 2
- Awards: 1957 Laurel Award for Topliner Supporting Actress for The Ten Commandments (1956)
- Musical career
- Genres: Blues; jazz; pop
- Instrument: Vocals
- Labels: Columbia; Capitol; Imperial; Masterseal (Remington)

Margaret Yvonne Middleton (September 1, 1922 – January 8, 2007), known professionally as Yvonne De Carlo, was a Canadian-American actress, dancer and singer. She became a Hollywood film star and sex symbol in the 1940s and 1950s, made several musical recordings, and later acted on television and stage.

De Carlo was born in Vancouver, British Columbia, and was enrolled in a local dance school by her mother when she was three. By the early 1940s, she and her mother had moved to Los Angeles, where De Carlo entered beauty contests and worked as a dancer in nightclubs. In 1942, she signed a three-year contract with Paramount Pictures, where she got uncredited bit parts in important films. Her first lead was for producer E.B. Derr in the 1943 James Fenimore Cooper adventure Deerslayer.

She obtained her breakthrough role in Salome, Where She Danced (1945), a Universal Pictures release produced by Walter Wanger, who described her as "the most beautiful girl in the world." The film's publicity and success turned her into a star, and she signed a five-year contract with Universal. Universal starred her in its lavish Technicolor productions, such as Frontier Gal (1945), Song of Scheherazade (1947), and Slave Girl (1947). Cameramen voted her "Queen of Technicolor" three years in a row. Tired of being typecast as exotic women, she made her first serious dramatic performances in two film noirs, Brute Force (1947) and Criss Cross (1949).

De Carlo received further recognition as an actress for her leading performances in the British comedies Hotel Sahara (1951), The Captain's Paradise (1953), and Happy Ever After (1954). Her career reached its peak when eminent producer-director Cecil B. DeMille cast her as Moses' Midianite wife, Sephora, in his biblical epic The Ten Commandments (1956). For this role, she won a Laurel Award for Topliner Supporting Actress. Her success continued with other notable starring roles in Flame of the Islands (1956), Death of a Scoundrel (1956), Raw Edge (1956), Band of Angels (1957), and The Sword and the Cross (1958), in which she portrayed Mary Magdalene.

She starred in the CBS sitcom The Munsters (1964–1966), playing Herman Munster's glamorous ghoulish wife, Lily, a role she reprised in the feature film Munster, Go Home! (1966) and the TV film The Munsters' Revenge (1981). In 1971, she played Carlotta Campion and introduced the popular song "I'm Still Here" in the Broadway production of the Stephen Sondheim musical Follies. Yvonne, her best-selling autobiography, was published in 1987. A stroke survivor, De Carlo died of heart failure in 2007. She was awarded two stars on the Hollywood Walk of Fame for her contributions to motion pictures and television.

== Early life ==
On the evening of August 31 that year [1922], three days after her own birthday, Marie was having five-minute contractions. She was taken to the public ward of St. Paul's Hospital, where she went through a difficult labor. I was born the following morning amid the tumult of the season's worst thunderstorm. Marie's doctor hadn't arrived, and the delivery was made by a pair of floor nurses. They confirmed afterward that as she was being shifted to the delivery table, she was shouting, "I want a girl. It must be a girl. I want a dancer!"

— Yvonne De Carlo, Yvonne: An Autobiography

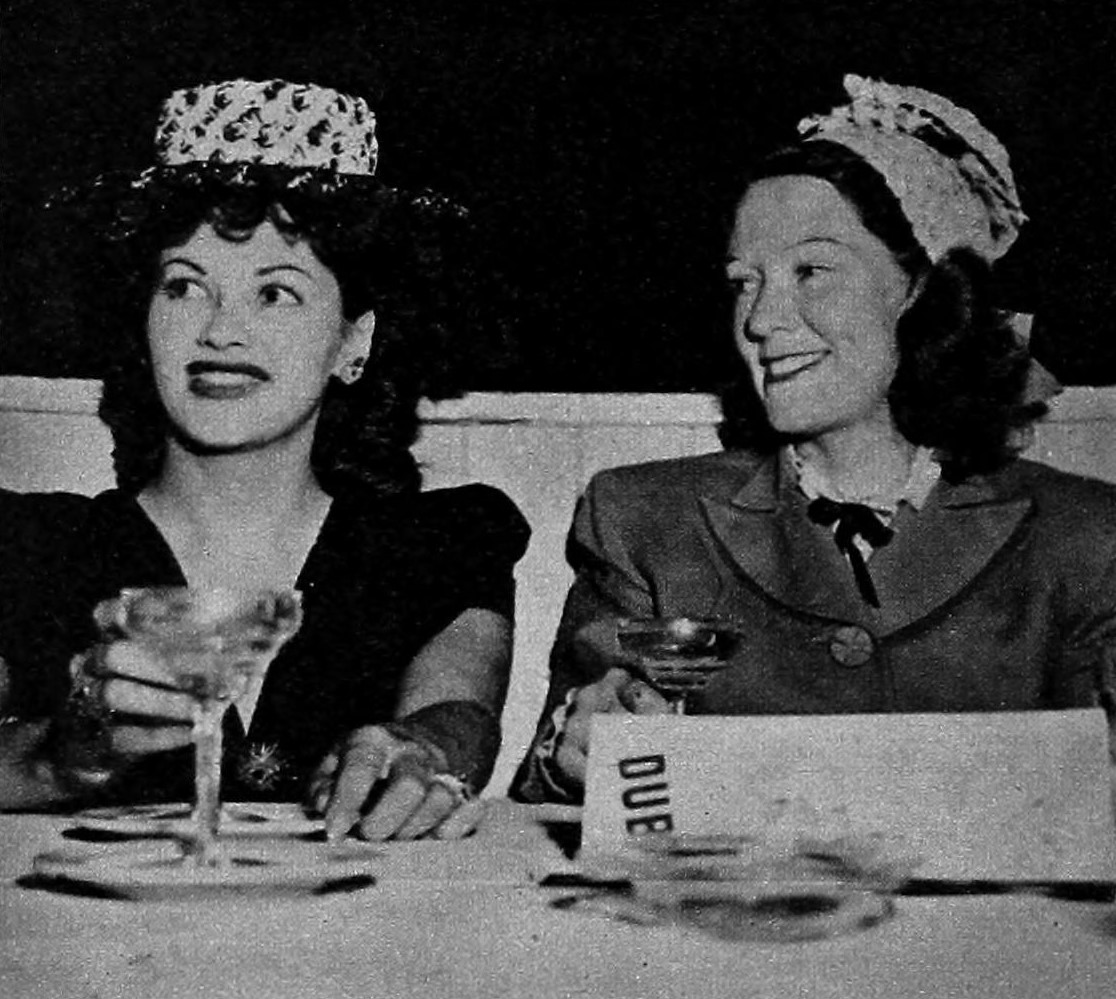
De Carlo (left) and her mother at the Florentine Gardens, c. 1941

De Carlo was born Margaret Yvonne Middleton on September 1, 1922, at St. Paul's Hospital in Vancouver, British Columbia, Canada. Her nickname was "Peggy" because she was named after the silent film star Baby Peggy. Her mother, Marie De Carlo, was born in France to a Sicilian father and a Scottish mother. Marie, a "wayward and rebellious" teenager, aspired to become a dancer and worked as a milliner's apprentice until she met Peggy's father, William Shelto Middleton. Middleton was a salesman born in New Zealand to English parents and had "piercing eyes of pale blue, and a wealth of straight black hair."

Marie and William married in Alberta, where they lived for a couple of months before returning to Vancouver. They moved in with Marie's parents, but the marriage was troubled. Peggy had only two memories of her father: climbing up to his knee and crawling toward his feet. By the time Peggy was three, William was involved in various swindles and fled Canada aboard a schooner, promising to send for his wife and child. Marie and Peggy never heard from him again; rumors said that he remarried twice and had more children, worked as an actor in silent films, or died aboard a ship. Peggy later wrote, "My own assumption is that he died before he had the chance to discover that his Baby Peggy had become a Hollywood actress, or I think he would have tried to contact me." After William's departure, Marie left her parents' home and found work in a shop.

Marie and Peggy lived in a succession of apartments in Vancouver, including one with no furniture or stove. They periodically returned to the De Carlo home, "a huge white frame house", at 1728 Comox Street in Vancouver's West End. Marie's parents, Michele "Papa" De Carlo and Margaret Purvis De Carlo, were religious, attended church regularly, and held services in their parlor. Michele, a native of Messina, had met Margaret in Nice, France. They married in 1897, had four children, and settled in Canada.

De Carlo attended Lord Roberts Elementary School, a block from her grandparents' home. She originally wanted to be a writer. She was seven when a school assignment, a poem she wrote titled "A Little Boy," was entered in a contest run by the Vancouver Sun. She won and received a prize of $5, which according to De Carlo, meant as much to her at that time as if she had won the Nobel Peace Prize. She also wrote short plays, which she usually staged in her grandparents' house, and even adapted Charles Dickens' A Christmas Carol for a neighborhood performance.

Marie wanted her daughter to have a career in show business and made sure Peggy received singing and dancing lessons. Peggy joined the choir of St. Paul's Anglican Church to strengthen her voice. When she was ten (or three, according to a 1982 interview), her mother enrolled her in the June Roper School of the Dance in Vancouver. In May 1939, a Variety news item listed Yvonne de Carlo as one of the performers at the opening of Hy Singer's Palomar ballroom (also known as Palomar Supper Club) in Vancouver.

== Early career ==
=== 1940–1942: Beginnings in Hollywood ===
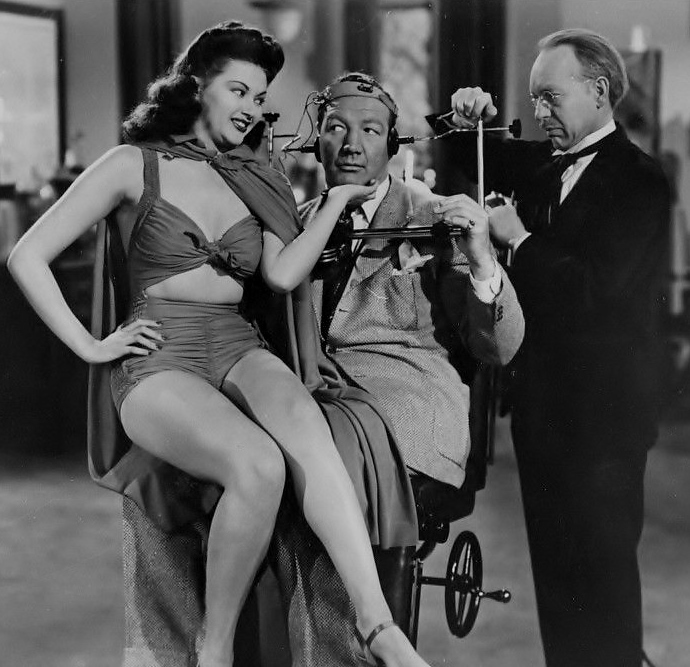
De Carlo's first film appearance was in the Maxie Rosenbloom vehicle Harvard, Here I Come (1941).

De Carlo and her mother made several trips to Los Angeles. In 1940, she won second place in the Miss Venice beauty contest, and placed fifth in that year's Miss California competition (and can be seen in that pageant at 0:36 of the British Pathé film "A Matter of Figures"). At the Miss Venice contest, she was noticed by a booking agent who told her to audition for an opening in the chorus line at the Earl Carroll Theatre on Sunset Boulevard in Hollywood.

De Carlo and her mother arrived at Earl Carroll's for the audition, but after learning that Carroll would have to examine her "upper assets" before hiring her, De Carlo and her mother searched for work at another popular Hollywood nightclub, the Florentine Gardens. They met the proprietor, Nils Granlund, and he introduced De Carlo to the audience before she tap danced to "Tea for Two". Granlund then asked, "Well, folks ... is she in or out?" The audience responded with "a rousing round of applause, with whistles and cheers", and De Carlo got the job. She started in the back of the chorus line, but after months of practice and hard work, Granlund featured her in a "King Kong number." In it, she danced, and cast off several chiffon veils before being carried away by a gorilla. She was given more solo routines.

She had been dancing at the Florentine Gardens only a few months when she was arrested by immigration officials and deported to Canada in late 1940. In January 1941, Granlund sent a telegram to immigration officials pledging his sponsorship of De Carlo in the US, and affirmed his offer of steady employment, both requirements to reenter the country.

In May 1941, she appeared in a revue, Hollywood Revels, at the Orpheum Theatre. A critic from the Los Angeles Times who reviewed it said the "dancing of Yvonne de Carlo is especially notable." She also made her debut on network radio with Edmund Lowe and Victor McLaglen, who were performing extracts from a series based on their Flagg-Quirt performances.

De Carlo wanted to act. At the encouragement of her friend Artie Shaw, who offered to pay her wages for a month, she quit the Florentine Gardens and hired talent agent Jack Pomeroy. Pomeroy got De Carlo an uncredited role as a bathing beauty in a Columbia Pictures B film, Harvard, Here I Come (1941). She had one line ("Nowadays a girl must show a front") in a scene with the film's star, ex-boxer Maxie Rosenbloom. Her salary was $25 and her work got her into the Screen Actors Guild. While at Columbia she was featured in a two-reel collegiate comedy, The Kink of the Campus (1941). She also starred in The Lamp of Memory (1942), a three-minute musical film designed to be shown in coin-operated "Soundies" movie jukeboxes.

When no other acting jobs came her way, she decided to return to the chorus line and auditioned for Earl Carroll, who hired her. While working for Carroll, she won a one-line part in This Gun for Hire (1942) at Paramount. Carroll found out and fired her, as he did not allow his dancers to work outside the nightclub without permission. She asked Granlund if he would rehire her, and he did. In December 1941, she was dancing in the Glamour Over Hollywood revue at the Gardens. America's entry into World War II saw De Carlo and other Florentine dancers busy entertaining troops at USO shows. A skilled horsewoman, she also appeared in a number of West Coast rodeos.

=== 1942–1944: Contract with Paramount ===
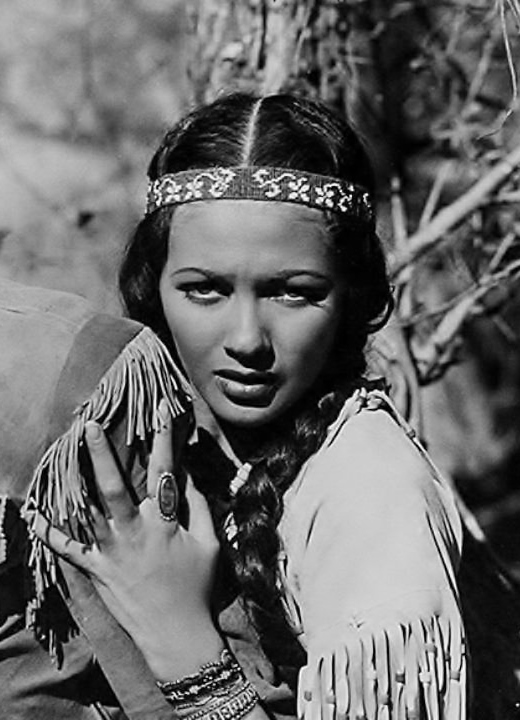
De Carlo as Wah-Tah in Deerslayer (1943), her first featured role in a full-length film

Following an interview at Paramount, De Carlo was cast as one of Dorothy Lamour's handmaidens in Road to Morocco (1942). She got a screen test for the role of Ata in The Moon and Sixpence, but lost to Elena Verdugo. She returned to Paramount for a bit role in Lucky Jordan (1942) and found another small part in a Republic Pictures film, Youth on Parade (1942), which she later called a "dreadful ... bomb." After recovering from bronchial pneumonia, she went to Paramount and signed a six-month contract, possibly going up to seven years, starting at $60 a week.

For her first assignment as a Paramount player, De Carlo was loaned to Monogram Pictures to play a Florentine Gardens dancer in Rhythm Parade, starring Nils Granlund (who had requested her for the role) and Gale Storm. She then appeared as an extra in Paramount's The Crystal Ball (1943), of which she wrote, "Only my left shoulder survived after editing." She asked director Sam Wood for a part in his next film, For Whom the Bell Tolls (1943), and he gave her a small role in the cantina scene with Gary Cooper.

De Carlo was also seen in Let's Face It (1943), So Proudly We Hail! (1943) and Salute for Three (1943). She kept busy in small roles and helping other actors shoot tests. "I was the test queen at Paramount," she said later. But she was ambitious and wanted more. "I'm not going to be just one of the girls," she said. Cecil B. DeMille, Paramount's most famous director, saw De Carlo in So Proudly We Hail! and arranged for a screen test and interview for a part in his film The Story of Dr. Wassell (1943). He subsequently selected her for a key role. He ended up choosing Carol Thurston for the role of Tremartini and casting De Carlo in an uncredited part as a native girl, but promised her another role in a future film.

Shortly after losing the Tremartini role, De Carlo was loaned to Republic Pictures to portray Native American princess Wah-Tah in Deerslayer. It was her first featured role in a full-length film. At Paramount, she played unbilled bit roles in True to Life (1943) and Standing Room Only (1944). She also tested for the role of Lola in Double Indemnity (1944). She was billed in a short, Fun Time (1944) and went to MGM to play an uncredited lady-in-waiting in Kismet (1944).

The New York Times later dubbed De Carlo "threat girl" for Dorothy Lamour "when Dotty wanted to break away from saronging." This had its origin when De Carlo was set to replace Dorothy Lamour in Rainbow Island (1944); however, Lamour changed her mind about the role. De Carlo was given a bit part in the final movie.

De Carlo played further unbilled roles in Here Come the Waves (1944), Practically Yours (1944), and Bring on the Girls (1945). Paramount decided not to renew her contract option, but did renew Lamour's contract.

== Stardom ==
=== 1944–1945: Salome, Where She Danced ===
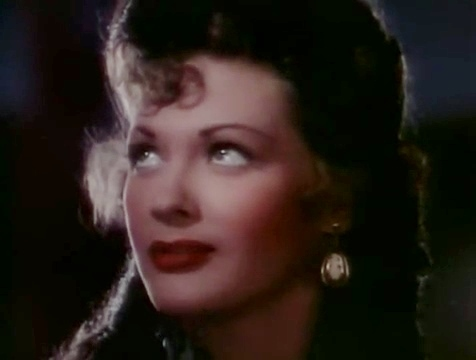
De Carlo in Salome, Where She Danced (1945)

De Carlo was screen tested by Universal, who were looking for an exotic glamour girl in the mold of Maria Montez and Acquanetta. The test was seen by Walter Wanger who was making an adventure film in Technicolor, Salome, Where She Danced (1945). Wanger later claimed he discovered De Carlo when looking at footage for another actor in which De Carlo also happened to appear (Milburn Stone).

Wanger tested De Carlo several times and Universal signed her to a long-term contract at $150 a week. In September 1944, it was announced that De Carlo was cast in the lead of Salome over a reported 20,000 other young women. Another source claimed 21 Royal Canadian Air Force bombardier students who loved De Carlo as a pinup star had campaigned to get her the role. De Carlo later said this was done at her behest; she took several pictures of herself in a revealing costume and persuaded two childhood friends from Vancouver, Reginald Reid and Kenneth Ross McKenzie, who had become pilots, to arrange their friends to lobby on her behalf, writing in her memoirs that the whole thing was Wanger's idea. Though not a critical success, Salome was a box office favorite, and the heavily promoted De Carlo was hailed as an up-and-coming star.

In his review of the film, Bosley Crowther of the New York Times wrote:

Miss De Carlo has an agreeable mezzo-soprano singing voice, all the 'looks' one girl could ask for, and, moreover, she dances with a sensuousness which must have caused the Hays office some anguish. The script, however, does not give her much chance to prove her acting talents.

=== 1946–1950: Universal's Queen of Technicolor ===
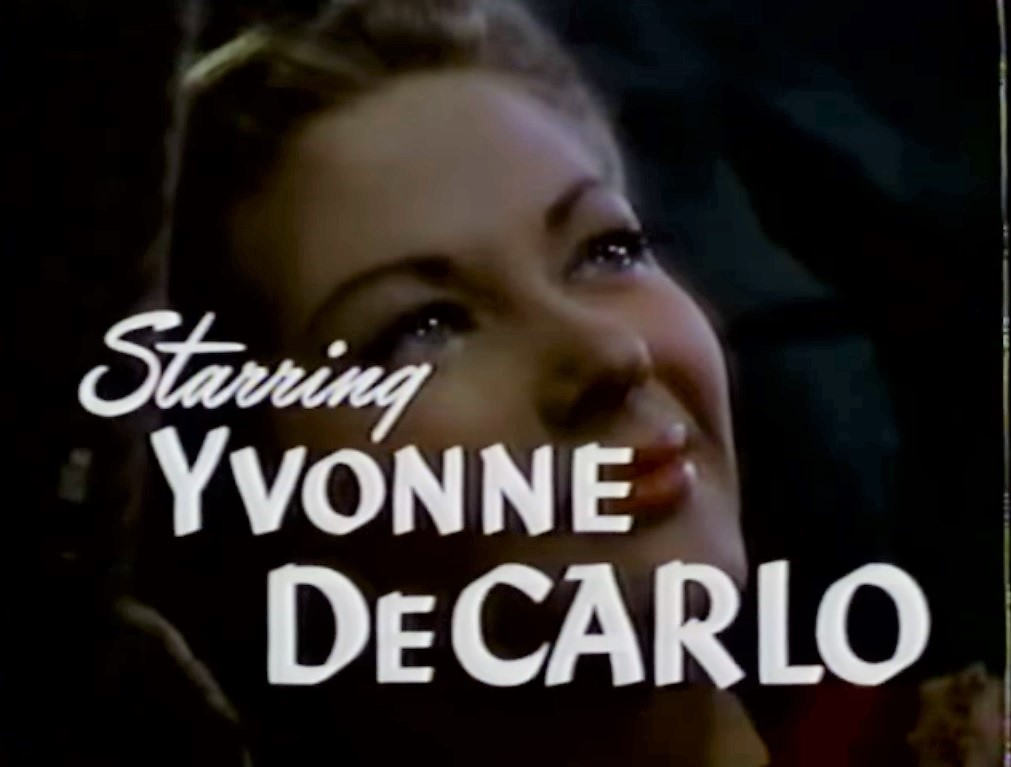
De Carlo in the trailer for Song of Scheherazade (1947)

Universal signed De Carlo to a long-term contract. She was used by the studio as a backup star to Maria Montez, and her second movie for the studio saw her step into a role rejected by Montez: the Western Frontier Gal (1946) alongside Rod Cameron. In 1946, exhibitors voted De Carlo the ninth-most promising "star of tomorrow." Like Salome, it was shot in Technicolor.

De Carlo followed Frontier Gal with a top-billed role in Walter Reisch's Technicolor musical Song of Scheherazade (1947), co-starring Brian Donlevy and Jean-Pierre Aumont. Tilly Losch, an Austrian dancer and friend of Reisch, coached De Carlo in her three dancing solos. The film was a hit, making over $2 million.

De Carlo wanted to act in different types of movies. She applied to play the part of a waitress in A Double Life (1947) but lost out to Shelley Winters. Instead, Universal put her back in Technicolor for Slave Girl (1947), made with the producers of Frontier Gal. It was another solid commercial success. De Carlo was given a small role in Brute Force (1947), a prison movie starring Burt Lancaster and produced by Mark Hellinger. It was her first movie in black and white since becoming a star and her first to get good reviews.

She played Lola Montez in Black Bart (1948), a Technicolor Western with Dan Duryea for director George Sherman. Duryea and Sherman worked with her again on River Lady (1948). De Carlo called these films "physically taxing but not creatively inspiring." The New York Times later summarised them as "a series of routine costume adventures as a tough but good-natured minx from across the tracks who wades into society and inevitably backtracks with a bloke of her own caliber."

She romanced Tony Martin in Casbah (1948), a musical remake of Algiers (1938) made for Martin's own production company but released through Universal. De Carlo was reluctant to be in it because, though she would receive top billing over Martin, she did not get the female lead. That part went to Swedish newcomer Märta Torén. However, studio head William Goetz insisted that De Carlo play Inez, the role Sigrid Gurie acted in the 1938 version. She also sang the film's song "For Every Man There's a Woman," which was nominated for the Academy Award for Best Original Song.

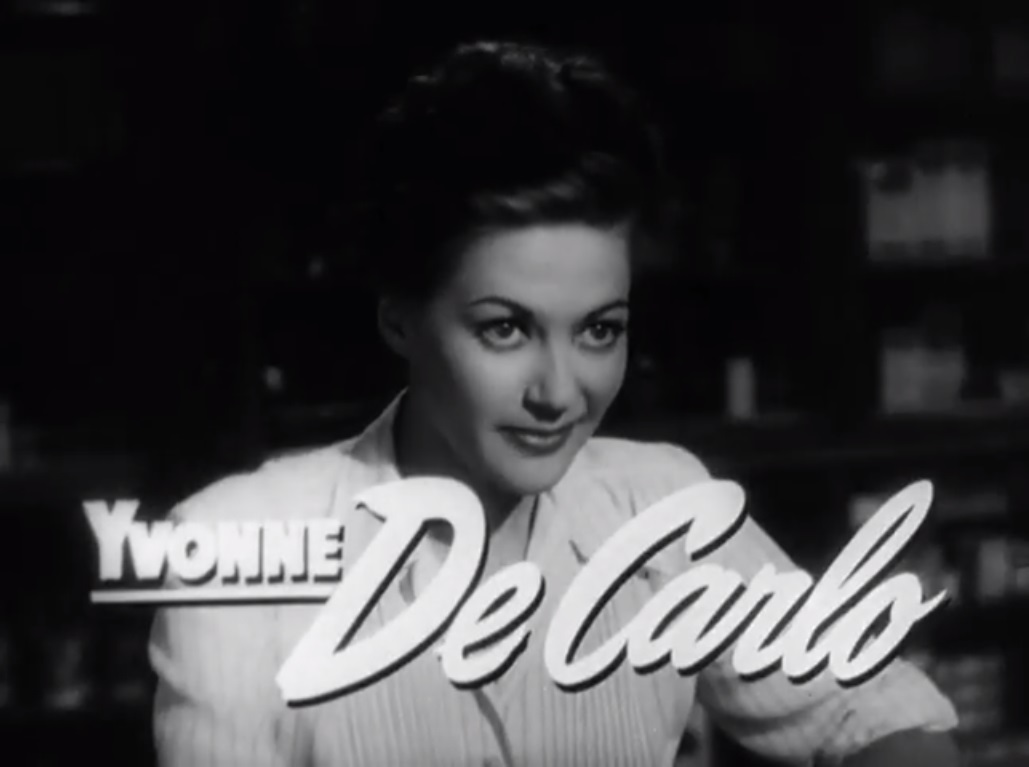
De Carlo in the trailer for Criss Cross (1949)

De Carlo then received an offer from Mark Hellinger to make another film with Burt Lancaster: the film noir Criss Cross (1949). This time De Carlo had a larger role, as a femme fatale, Anna. Bosley Crowther noted that De Carlo was "trying something different as Anna. The change is welcome, even though Miss de Carlo's performance is uneven. In that respect, she is right in step with most everything else about Criss Cross." The film has become regarded as a classic and De Carlo considered the role the highlight of her career to date. Tony Curtis made his debut in the movie, in a scene dancing with De Carlo.

De Carlo was keen to make more movies along this line but Universal put her back in Technicolor Westerns with Calamity Jane and Sam Bass (1949), playing Calamity Jane, directed by Sherman, alongside Howard Duff.

She played a role intended for Deanna Durbin in The Gal Who Took the West (1950), for director Fred de Cordova. The movie gave her a chance to show off her singing voice. Trained in opera and a former child chorister at St Paul's Anglican Church, Vancouver, De Carlo possessed a large vocal range. She was meant to be in Bagdad (1949) but suffered a miscarriage and was ill, so the studio cast Maureen O'Hara.

De Cordova directed de Carlo in Buccaneer's Girl (1950), a pirate movie set in 1810s New Orleans opposite Philip Friend was a box office and critical failure. The director later called De Carlo "a doll ... underrated as an actress. She was most professional, worked hard, was very good at her craft, possibly was not a first class star but came in on schedule. She knew her lines, she danced and sang rather well, and she wanted very much to be a bigger star than she ever became."

She toured US army bases singing, then was in The Desert Hawk (1950), an "Eastern" with Richard Greene. She made a Western with Sherman, Tomahawk (1951), opposite Van Heflin, which was popular.

=== 1951–1952: Live performances and TV debut ===
De Carlo toured extensively to promote her films and entertained US troops in Europe. She also began singing on television. She received an offer from England to make a comedy, Hotel Sahara (1951) with Peter Ustinov. While in England, she asked Universal to release her from her contract, though it still had three months to go, and the studio agreed.

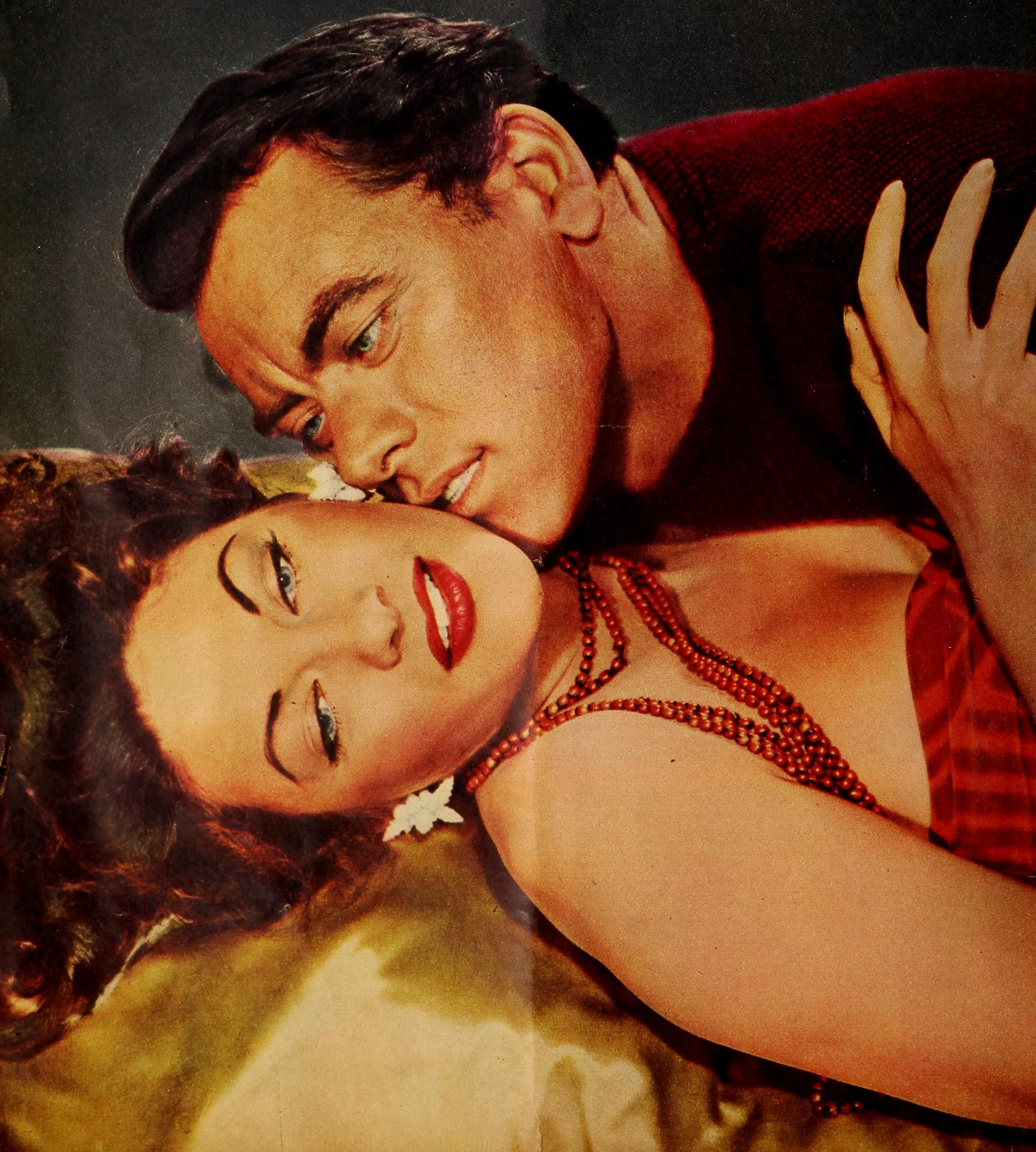
De Carlo and fellow Vancouverite John Ireland in Hurricane Smith (1952), a Paramount Pictures release

While in England, De Carlo recorded two singles, "Say Goodbye" and "I Love a Man". In March 1951 she signed a new contract with Universal to make one film a year for three years.

De Carlo went to Paramount to make a Western, Silver City (1951), for producer Nat Holt, co-starring alongside Edmond O'Brien for a fee of $50,000.

In 1951, De Carlo accepted an offer to open the thirtieth season of the Hollywood Bowl singing the breeches role of Prince Orlovsky in five performances of the opera Die Fledermaus (The Bat), from July 10 to 14. The performances were conducted by noted film composer Franz Waxman. In her autobiography she described her participation in Die Fledermaus as "a rewarding experience, the aesthetic highlight of my life."

In August 1951, De Carlo became the first Canadian film star to visit the State of Israel, giving concerts in Haifa, Ramat Gan, Jerusalem, Tel Aviv, and Jaffa. She drew capacity audiences and was "royally received" by the Israeli government and the public. Her performances consisted of singing and dancing routines from her films.

She discovered that her films were extremely popular there, saying, "Every time I played a concert, someone would yell, 'Sing something from Casbah.'" About the warm reception she received in Israel, she told columnist Louella Parsons:

Everyone in Israel was so wonderful to me, and I'll never forget the speech the Mayor of Jerusalem, Rabbi S. Z. Shragar, made. It had to be translated because he spoke in Hebrew. He is an Orthodox Jew and lives up to his religion. He received me in his office and served me Turkish coffee, and I was told no woman had ever been invited to have coffee in his office before. He welcomed me to Israel in a gracious, kindly manner that I shall never forget. He gave me what they call a special blessing, not only for myself, but for all artists who were to come later.

De Carlo returned early from Tel Aviv to make The San Francisco Story (1952) with Joel McCrea. It was the first of a two-picture deal with Fidelity Pictures; the second was to be The Scarlet Flame about Brazil's battle for independence, which was never made.

She made her live TV debut in "Another Country" for Lights Out (1952). De Carlo wanted to make a film for Sydney Box called Queen of Sheba with Peter Ustinov as Solomon but it was never made.

She went back to Universal for the first movie under her new contract, Scarlet Angel (1952) with Rock Hudson. At Paramount, she did another film for Nat Holt, Hurricane Smith (1952), then she appeared in "Madame 44" for The Ford Television Theatre (1952). She announced plans to form her own production company with her agent, Vancouver Productions. However, as she later wrote, "absolutely nothing" came of this.

=== 1953–1954: International movie star ===
De Carlo went to MGM to make Sombrero (1953), mostly shot in Mexico. She liked her character because it was "almost madonnalike. It is a role that demands the most sincerity for its proper interpretation. Many pictures that I have done perhaps offered me typical outdoor parts or western, heroine parts. So long as I could convey a flashy sort of impression it was all right... I don't deny the importance of such parts for me. They are excellent. But is stands to reason that as one goes on one seeks less superficial assignments.

De Carlo was reunited with Hudson for Sea Devils (1953), a Napoleonic adventure tale shot in Britain and France released through RKO. This meant she had to postpone a film she was going to make for Edward Small, Savage Frontier. She was offered a role in Innocents in Paris (1953) but ultimately did not appear in the film.

Back in the US, she had an adventure film set in the desert, Fort Algiers (1953), for United Artists, starring Carlos Thompson, whom de Carlo had recommended.

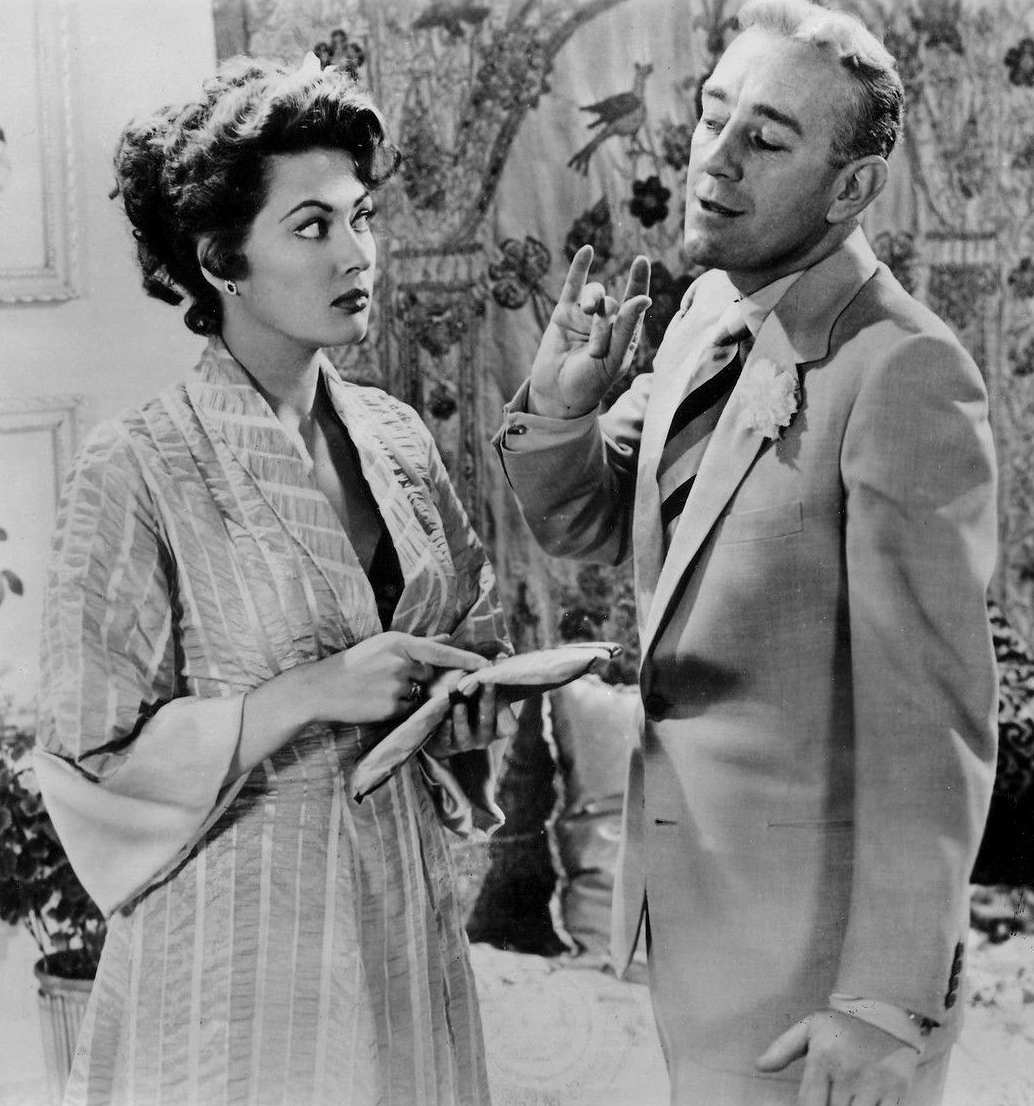
De Carlo with Alec Guinness in The Captain's Paradise (1953)

She made her third film in Britain with The Captain's Paradise (1953), a comedy featuring the two wives a ship captain (played by Alec Guinness) keeps in separate ports. De Carlo played Nita, the sensual wife who lives in Morocco, while Celia Johnson played Maud, the demure wife who lives in Gibraltar. The New York Times critic Bosley Crowther commended her performance by writing, "And Miss De Carlo, as the siren, 'the mate of the tiger' in Mr. G. [Guinness], is wonderfully candid and suggestive of the hausfrau in every dame."

De Carlo made a fourth film in England, Happy Ever After (1954) released in the US as "Tonight's The Night", a comedy featuring her as the love interest for David Niven, who inherits an estate in Ireland. She was then called back to the US to do a contemporary TV comedy, The Backbone of America (1953) with Wendell Corey. In 1954, after the success of The Captain's Paradise, she expressed a desire to do more comedy:

I've had my share of sirens and am happy to get away from them, no matter what the part. Just to look pretty on the screen as a romantic lead is probably all right, but – so what? I'd much rather do something in a good Western provided there's plenty of action. Action is what I like.

De Carlo went back to Universal to make a Western with McCrea, Border River (1954), directed by Sherman. She went to Italy for The Contessa's Secret (1954) and returned to Hollywood for the independently produced Passion (1954). She wrote a 42-page treatment for a science-fiction film Operation Sram, which was not made. De Carlo made the Western Shotgun (1955) with Sterling Hayden for Allied Artists. She did "Hot Cargo" for Screen Director's Playhouse (1956) with Rory Calhoun directed by Tay Garnett.

De Carlo made her third film for Universal under her new contract in Raw Edge (1956). Republic starred her as Minna Wagner in a biopic of Richard Wagner, Magic Fire (1956). On TV she was in "The Sainted General" for Star Stage (1956). Republic reunited her with Duff in Flame of the Islands (1956), shot in the Bahamas.

=== 1955–1956: Award-winning performance in The Ten Commandments ===
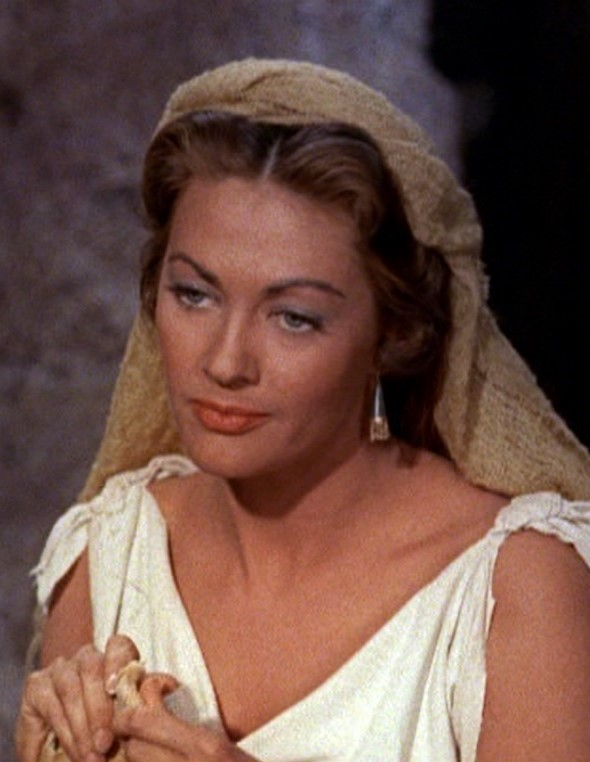
De Carlo won a Laurel Award for Topliner Supporting Actress for her role as Sephora in The Ten Commandments (1956).

In September 1954, producer-director Cecil B. DeMille cast her as Sephora, the wife of Moses (played by Charlton Heston), in his biblical epic The Ten Commandments, a Paramount Pictures production that premiered in November 1956. In his autobiography, DeMille explained he decided to cast De Carlo as Moses' wife after his casting director, Bert McKay, called his attention to one scene she played in Sombrero. Even though the film "was a picture far removed in theme from The Ten Commandments," wrote DeMille, "I sensed in her a depth, an emotional power, a womanly strength which the part of Sephora needed and which she gave it."

She prepared extensively for the role, taking weaving lessons at the University of California, Los Angeles, and shepherding lessons in the San Fernando Valley. Months before filming began, she had worked on the part with a drama coach. Her scenes were shot on Paramount's sound stages in 1955. Her performance received praise from critics. Crowther, the New York Times critic, was impressed: "Yvonne De Carlo as the Midianite shepherdess to whom Moses is wed is notably good in a severe role." The Hollywood Reporter wrote that she "is very fine as the simple Sephora," and the New York Daily News noticed that she "plays the wife of Moses with conviction." De Carlo was expected to receive an Academy Award nomination for Best Supporting Actress, but she preferred to be listed as a leading actress on the voting ballot and was not nominated in that category. However, she won a Laurel Award for Topliner Supporting Actress for her performance in the film.

She fell in love with stuntman Bob Morgan while visiting the filming of The Ten Commandments in Egypt in 1954. They married in 1955, and their first son, Bruce, was born in 1956. DeMille became Bruce's godfather. Her second pregnancy meant she had to turn down the role of the female pirate DeMille had given her in his next production, The Buccaneer (1958).

It was announced she would team with Vittorio De Sica in an adaptation of The Baker's Wife to be shot in English and Italian but the film was never made. Neither were two projects de Carlo was meant to make in Italy following Raw Edge, The Mistress of Lebanon Castle with Trevor Howard and Honeymoon in Italy. Instead, De Carlo co-starred with George Sanders and Zsa Zsa Gabor in Death of a Scoundrel (1956). The New York Times commended her performance as Bridget Kelly: "Yvonne De Carlo does a solid and professional job as the adoring petty thief who rises to eminence with him [Sanders' character]."

=== 1957–1964: Band of Angels and Broadway debut ===
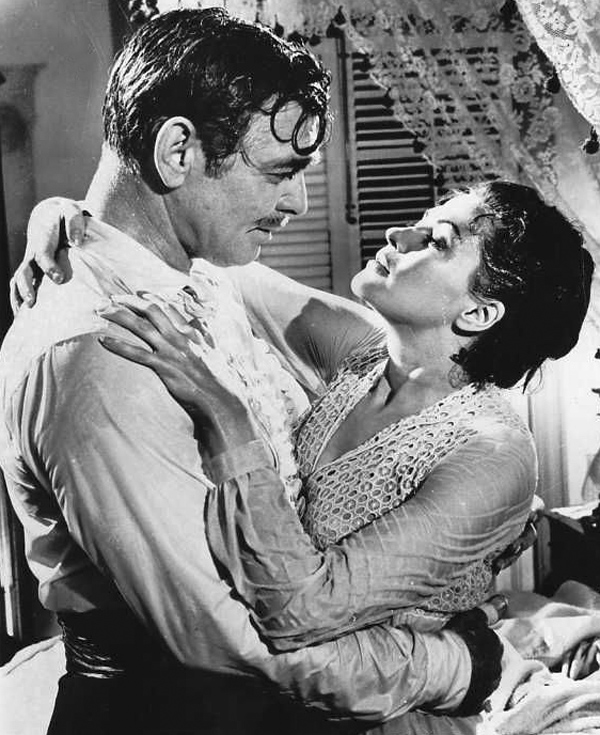
With Clark Gable in Band of Angels (1957)

As a result of the great success and positive reviews of The Ten Commandments, De Carlo was offered lead roles in two Warner Bros. films that would be shot at the same time: The Helen Morgan Story and Band of Angels, based on Robert Penn Warren's novel. De Carlo chose the latter because her co-star would be Clark Gable, one of her favorite actors. The title refers to the short life expectancy of the black soldiers who fought with the Union troops in the Civil War, but the story is mainly about Amantha "Manty" Starr, a mixed-race Southern belle who is sold as a slave after her father's death and discovers that her deceased mother was a black slave on her father's plantation. Amantha is then taken to New Orleans where she is bought by plantation owner Hamish Bond (Gable), who falls in love with her. The film was both a critical and financial disappointment at the time of release.

On the small screen she was in "Skits & Sketches" for Shower of Stars (1957). She was also in Schlitz Playhouse (1957). De Carlo released an LP record of standards called Yvonne De Carlo Sings on Masterseal Records, a subsidiary label of Remington Records, in 1957. Orchestrated by future film composer John Williams under the pseudonym "John Towner", the album contains ten tracks, "End of a Love Affair", "In the Blue of Evening", "I Got It Bad (and That Ain't Good)", "Am I Blue?", "Little Girl Blue", "Blue Moon", "But Not for Me", "My Blue Heaven", "Mood Indigo", "One for My Baby (and One More for the Road)".

De Carlo was in "Verdict of Three" for Playhouse 90 (1958). She made a French Foreign Legion movie with Victor Mature, Timbuktu, directed by Jacques Tourneur (1958). She unsuccessfully auditioned for the Broadway musical Destry Rides Again losing out to Dolores Gray.

In May 1958, De Carlo was signed to play Mary Magdalene in the Italian biblical epic The Sword and the Cross (tentatively titled The Great Sinner and released in the United States as Mary Magdalene), with Jorge Mistral as her love interest, the Roman Gaius Marcellus, and Rossana Podestà as her sister, Martha. The film's director, Carlo Ludovico Bragaglia, later remembered that "producer, Ottavio Poggi, had sent the provisional script to America, so Yvonne De Carlo could read it and decide on her participation in the film. She read it and got very excited, agreeing to play the role of Magdalene." The film was shot in English and later dubbed in Italian.

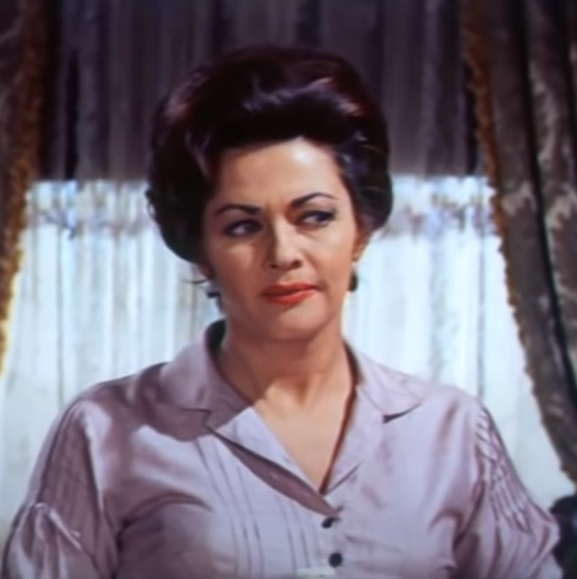
De Carlo in McLintock! (1963)

De Carlo put together a nightclub act and toured with it in South America. She guest-starred on Bonanza ("A Rose for Lotta", 1959), Adventures in Paradise ("Isle of Eden", 1960), Death Valley Days ("The Lady Was an M.D", 1961), Follow the Sun ("The Longest Crap Game in History" [1961] and "Annie Beeler's Place", 1962) and Burke's Law ("Who Killed Beau Sparrow?", 1963). She also played Destry Rides Again in summer stock.

De Carlo's husband had become permanently disabled while working as a stunt man on How the West Was Won (1963), eventually losing his leg. De Carlo took any job going, appearing in night club acts across the country as well as a play in stock, Third Best Sport.

To help out, John Wayne offered her the supporting role of Louise Warren, the title character's cook in McLintock! (1963), with Wayne and Maureen O'Hara. She was second billed in a Western Law of the Lawless (1964) and played the Spanish dancer Dolores in the Bob Hope comedy A Global Affair (1964).

De Carlo was in "The Night the Monkey Died" for The Greatest Show on Earth (1964). She took over a role on Enter Laughing on Broadway for a week and played in it when the production went on tour.

== Later career ==
=== 1964–1966: The Munsters ===
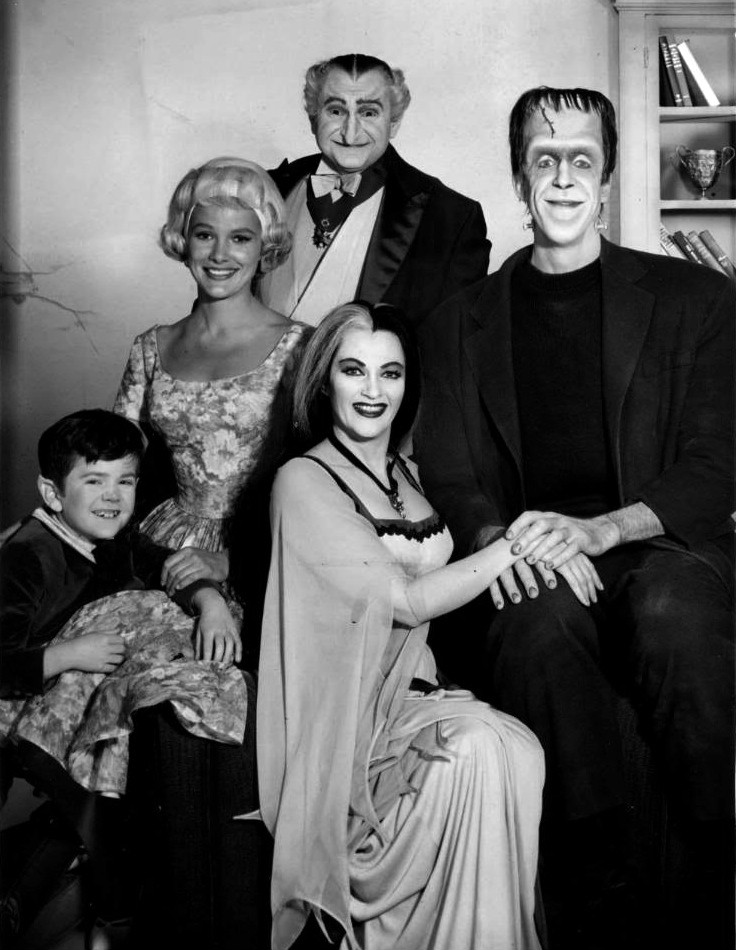
De Carlo (with sleeved dress) along with the cast of The Munsters in 1964

She was in debt by 1964 when she signed a contract with Universal Studios to perform the female lead role in The Munsters opposite Fred Gwynne. She was also the producers' choice to play Lily Munster when Joan Marshall, who played the character (originally called "Phoebe") in the pilot presentation, was dropped from consideration for the role. When De Carlo was asked how a glamorous actress could succeed as a ghoulish matriarch of a haunted house, she replied simply, "I follow the directions I received on the first day of shooting: 'Play her just like Donna Reed.'" She sang and played the harp in at least one episode ("Far Out Munsters") of The Munsters. In early season 1 episodes, De Carlo was top billed, owing to her star status, but later in the season, Gwynne (and his character, Herman Munster) received the top billing.

After the show's cancellation, she reprised her role as Lily Munster in the Technicolor film Munster, Go Home! (1966), partially in hopes of renewing interest in the sitcom. Despite the attempt, The Munsters was canceled after 70 episodes. Of the sitcom and its cast and crew, she said: "It was a happy show with audience appeal for both children and adults. It was a happy show behind the scenes, too; we all enjoy working with each other." Years later, in 1987, she said: "I think Yvonne De Carlo was more famous than Lily, but I gained the younger audience through The Munsters. And it was a steady job."

=== 1967–1973: Stage appearances and Follies ===
After The Munsters, she guest-starred in "The Moulin Ruse Affair" in The Girl from U.N.C.L.E. (1967) and "The Raiders" for Custer (1967) and episodes of The Virginian.

She starred as the leading lady in Hostile Guns (1967) and Arizona Bushwhackers (1968), a pair of low-budget westerns produced by A. C. Lyles and released by Paramount Pictures. During this time, she also had a supporting role in the 1968 MGM science-fiction thriller The Power.

After 1967, De Carlo became increasingly active in musicals, appearing in off-Broadway productions of Pal Joey and Catch Me If You Can. In early 1968 she joined Donald O'Connor in a 15-week run of Little Me staged between Lake Tahoe and Las Vegas and she did a five-month tour in Hello Dolly. Later she toured in Cactus Flower.

De Carlo continued to appear in films such as The Delta Factor (1970) and had a notable part in Russ Meyer's The Seven Minutes (1971). The Los Angeles Times said about the latter that De Carlo featured in "an improbable sequence pulled off with verve by the still glamorous star."

Theatrical agent Ruth Webb presented De Carlo to Hal Prince, Stephen Sondheim, and Michael Bennett when they were searching for actors for their musical Follies. Webb believed De Carlo was ideal for the leading female role and helped her audition for it, but De Carlo felt she was not the right actress to play a "sophisticated society type." Several weeks later, De Carlo met again with Prince, Sondheim, and Bennett, who told her that they had enjoyed her audition and decided to write a new character, Carlotta Campion, especially for her. Carlotta is a former showgirl who attends a final reunion at her former workplace, a theater scheduled for demolition. The first song Sondheim wrote for De Carlo, "Oh Boy, Can That Boy Fox-trot", was dropped after the show's first road performance. Inspired by the "warm quality" of De Carlo's audition, Sondheim wrote a new song titled "I'm Still Here". Follies opened on Broadway at the Winter Garden Theatre on April 4, 1971 and ran for 522 performances, closing on July 1, 1972.

In October 1972, De Carlo arrived in Australia to replace Cyd Charisse in Michael Edgley's production of No, No, Nanette. Her opening night was on November 6, 1972, at Her Majesty's Theatre in Melbourne. The show moved on to Adelaide, Sydney, and then to several New Zealand cities. It closed in the fall of 1973, and De Carlo returned to the United States.

In late 1973 and early 1974, she starred in a production of Ben Bagley's Decline and Fall of the Entire World as Seen Through the Eyes of Cole Porter in San Diego. In May 1975, she starred in the San Bernardino Civic Light Opera's production of Applause at the California Theatre of the Performing Arts. The San Bernardino Sun described her performance as "brilliant" and wrote, "a packed house watched Yvonne De Carlo give a new dimension to Margo Channing, a part she was playing for the first time, but nonetheless, a part she was very well suited for."

=== 1974–1995: Horror movies and final roles ===
As for my stage or film roles, there was a period of time when I was less selective than I might have been. If a job was offered, and if the price was right, I took it. I needed the money.

— Yvonne De Carlo, Yvonne: An Autobiography

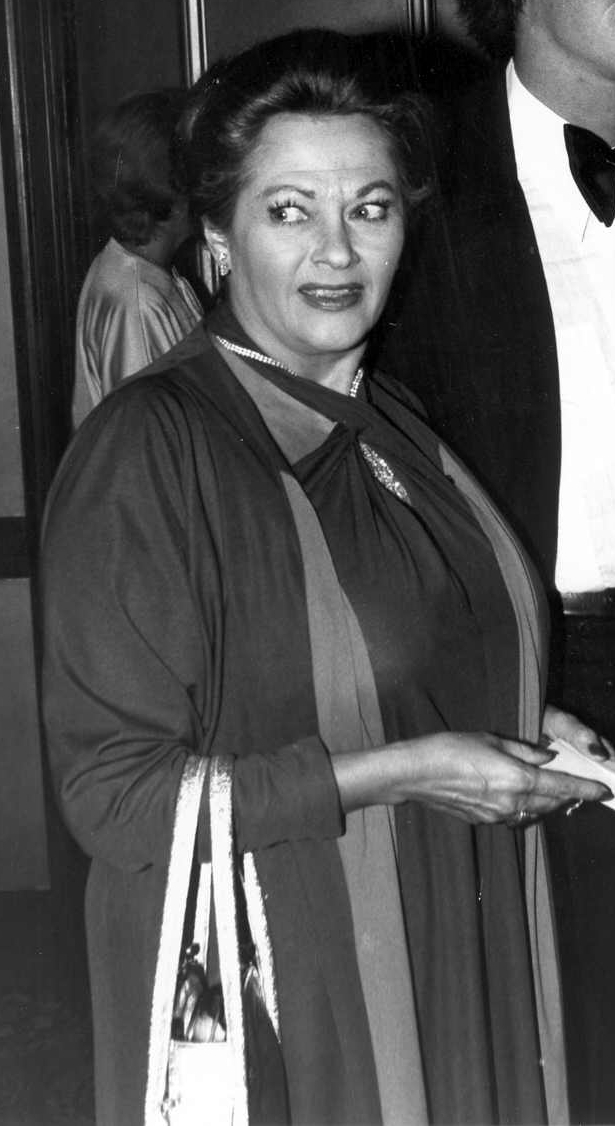
De Carlo at the National Film Society convention in 1979

De Carlo appeared in The Girl on the Late, Late Show (1974), The Mark of Zorro (1974), Arizona Slim (1974), The Intruder (1975), It Seemed Like a Good Idea at the Time (1975), Black Fire (1975), and La casa de las sombras (1976).. Independent producer Sam Sherman hired her for a leading role in Blazing Stewardesses (1975); despite its provocative title, it was a revival of 1940s westerns and co-starred former cowboy heroes Robert Livingston and Don "Red" Barry. De Carlo pre-recorded the vocal for an original song.

She continued to appear on stage, notably in Dames at Sea, Barefoot in the Park and The Sound of Music.

She was seen on Satan's Cheerleaders (1977), Nocturna (1979), Guyana: Cult of the Damned (1979), Fuego negro (1979), The Silent Scream (1979) and The Man with Bogart's Face (1980). She guest-starred on shows like Fantasy Island.

De Carlo was in The Munsters' Revenge (1981), then Liar's Moon (1982), Play Dead (1982), Vultures (1984), Flesh and Bullets (1985), and A Masterpiece of Murder (1986) (with Bob Hope). She was in a revival of The Munsters.

De Carlo's later films included American Gothic (1988), for which she won the Best Actress Award from International Science Fiction and Fantasy Film Show (Fantafestival); Cellar Dweller (1988); and Mirror Mirror (1990). She had a supporting role as the title character's Aunt Rosa in the Sylvester Stallone comedy Oscar (1991). Aunt Rosa is present when Oscar's father, played by Kirk Douglas, extracts "a deathbed promise" from his son. Of her role, De Carlo said, "Mine is a small part—but funny."

She appeared in Murder, She Wrote ("Jessica Behind Bars", 1985), The Naked Truth (1992), Seasons of the Heart (1993), and "Death of Some Salesmen" in Tales from the Crypt (1993). She had a small cameo role in Here Come the Munsters, a 1995 television film remake of The Munsters. De Carlo, along with Al Lewis, Pat Priest, and Butch Patrick, did not have to wear costumes "because the Munsters have several lives."

Her final performance was as Norma, "an eccentric Norma Desmond lookalike", in the 1995 television film The Barefoot Executive, a Disney Channel remake of the 1971 film of the same title. Norma, a former stand-in for film actors, "monkey-sits" the title character, a chimpanzee named Archie who is able to predict top-rated television series. "She has these outrageous costumes—six of them—and it's just a small part", De Carlo told Los Angeles Times. "But I like to do small things now."

In 2007, her son Bruce revealed that, before her death, she played supporting roles in two independent films that have yet to be released.

== Personal life ==
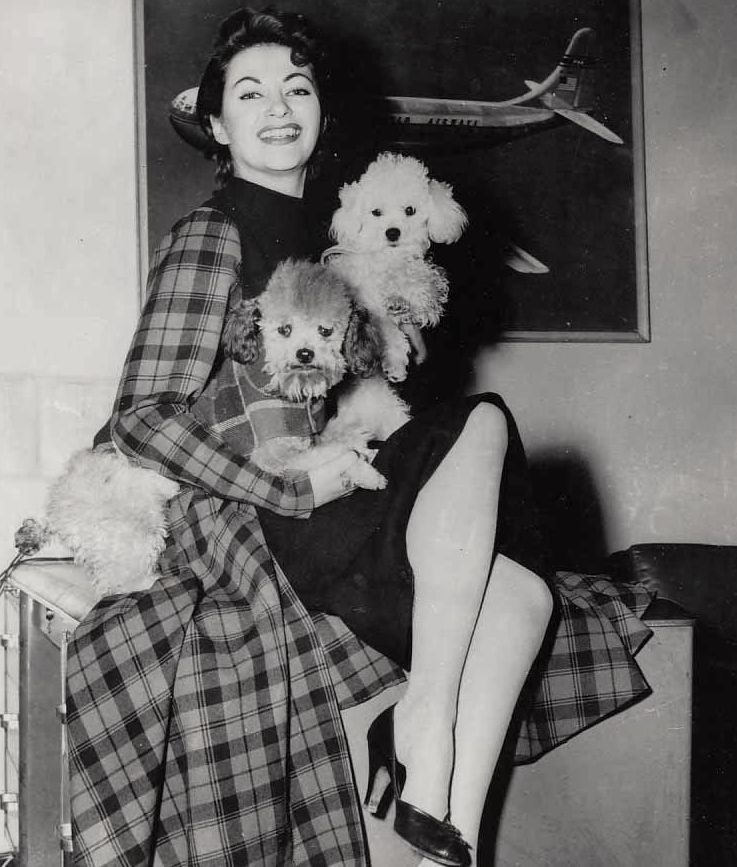
De Carlo with Poodles Winky and Billy, 1954

In 1950, De Carlo purchased an eleven-room ranch house on five-and-a-half acres of "hilly woodland" on Coldwater Canyon Drive in Studio City, Los Angeles, above Beverly Hills. De Carlo described it as her "dream home" and hired an architect to help her design "an English-style dining room, with paneling and stained-glass windows." She also built stables for her horses and a large swimming pool. She sold the property in 1975. In 1981, she moved to a ranch in the Santa Ynez Valley, near Solvang, California.

=== Relationships ===
In her autobiography, De Carlo considered director Billy Wilder "the first big love of my life". They met in 1943 when she was under contract to Paramount Pictures. Although she described him as the physical "antithesis of my lifelong dream man", she fell in love with him and admired his "endless charm and wit". He was separated from his wife and lived in a rented house while they were together. Their short-lived relationship ended when he left her for actress Doris Dowling.

In 1945, after the release of her second film, Frontier Gal, De Carlo returned to Vancouver and attended a celebration held in her honor at her former workplace, the Palomar nightclub, where she was introduced to billionaire Howard Hughes. She later discovered he had flown directly from Los Angeles because he wanted to meet her outside of Hollywood. Hughes told her he had seen Salome, Where She Danced more than five times and was enthraled by her beauty. De Carlo initially "felt just kind of sorry" for the "lanky, underfed, and remarkably sad" Hughes. The following day they went out on a date and began a romantic relationship. Hughes preferred to keep their romance private and never mentioned it to the press. De Carlo wanted to marry him but he was not serious about their relationship. De Carlo later wrote, "Howard Hughes was one of the most important loves of my life".

After her breakup with Hughes, De Carlo dated Robert Stack and Burt Lancaster, her Criss Cross co-star. During the filming of Brute Force, De Carlo fell in love with her co-star, fellow Universal contract player Howard Duff. Despite the fact that they "had almost nothing in common," Duff was interested in marrying De Carlo and the studio approved their relationship. In April 1947, De Carlo announced her engagement to Duff, but they eventually separated due to his alcoholism.

De Carlo met Prince Abdul Reza Pahlavi of Iran when he visited Beverly Hills in 1947. A week later, they traveled to New York and spent some time together. After the completion of her film Casbah, De Carlo embarked on her first trip to Europe, reuniting with Prince Abdul in Paris. They vacationed in Switzerland and Italy, and, several months later, De Carlo also visited the royal palace in Tehran.

In the late 1940s, De Carlo began a relationship with Jock Mahoney, a stuntman who worked on her film The Gal Who Took the West. While she was engaged to Mahoney, De Carlo became pregnant and also discovered she had a large ovarian cyst. The tumor was surgically removed and, as a result, she lost the baby. Her relationship with Mahoney ended when De Carlo found out he was seeing another woman, actress Margaret Field.

Regarding her ideal man, in May 1952 she said: "I have learned not to prefer anything because tastes change every day. For instance, I used to prefer blond men but that is no longer true today." Five months later, in October, she said: "I would like to marry a man with blonde hair. From what I have heard, blond men make the most interesting husbands."

In the 1950s, one of her fiancés was English photographer Cornel Lucas. In early 1954, she informed columnist Erskine Johnson about her engagement to Scottish actor Robert Urquhart, her co-star in Happy Ever After. She said, "I'm just getting settled down into feeling that I'm ready for marriage. Before, I felt that I wasn't ready."

In the spring of 1954, she told a journalist:

I think it is wonderful to work. I dedicate more time now than ever to study. I really like to delve deeply into the characters and the stories in order to make the most of each part I play. It seems best to remain free of any serious romantic attachments under these circumstances. I will have to meet an exceptional and understanding person, indeed, before I think of marriage. I haven't met such a person yet.

=== Marriage ===
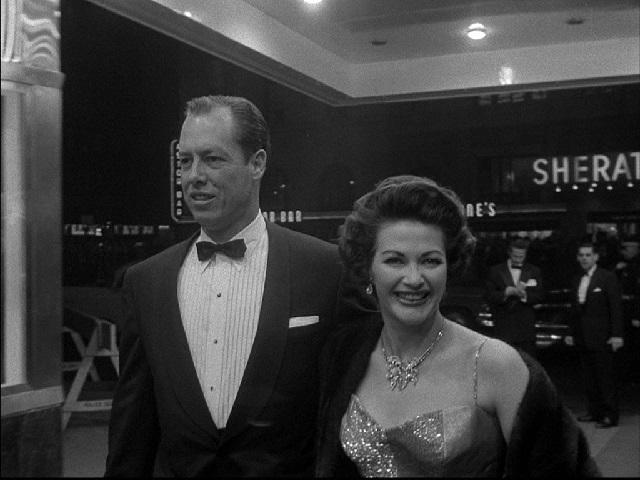
De Carlo with her husband, Robert Morgan, at the New York premiere of The Ten Commandments in 1956

De Carlo met stuntman Robert Drew "Bob" Morgan on the set of Shotgun in 1955, but he was married and had a daughter, and De Carlo had "no intention of causing that marriage to break up." However, they met again, after the death of Morgan's wife, on the set of The Ten Commandments in Egypt, where they "seemed immediately attracted to each other." They were married on November 21, 1955, at St. Stephen's Episcopal Church in Reno, Nevada. De Carlo raised Morgan's daughter as her own and had two sons with him, one whose godfather was Cecil B. DeMille.

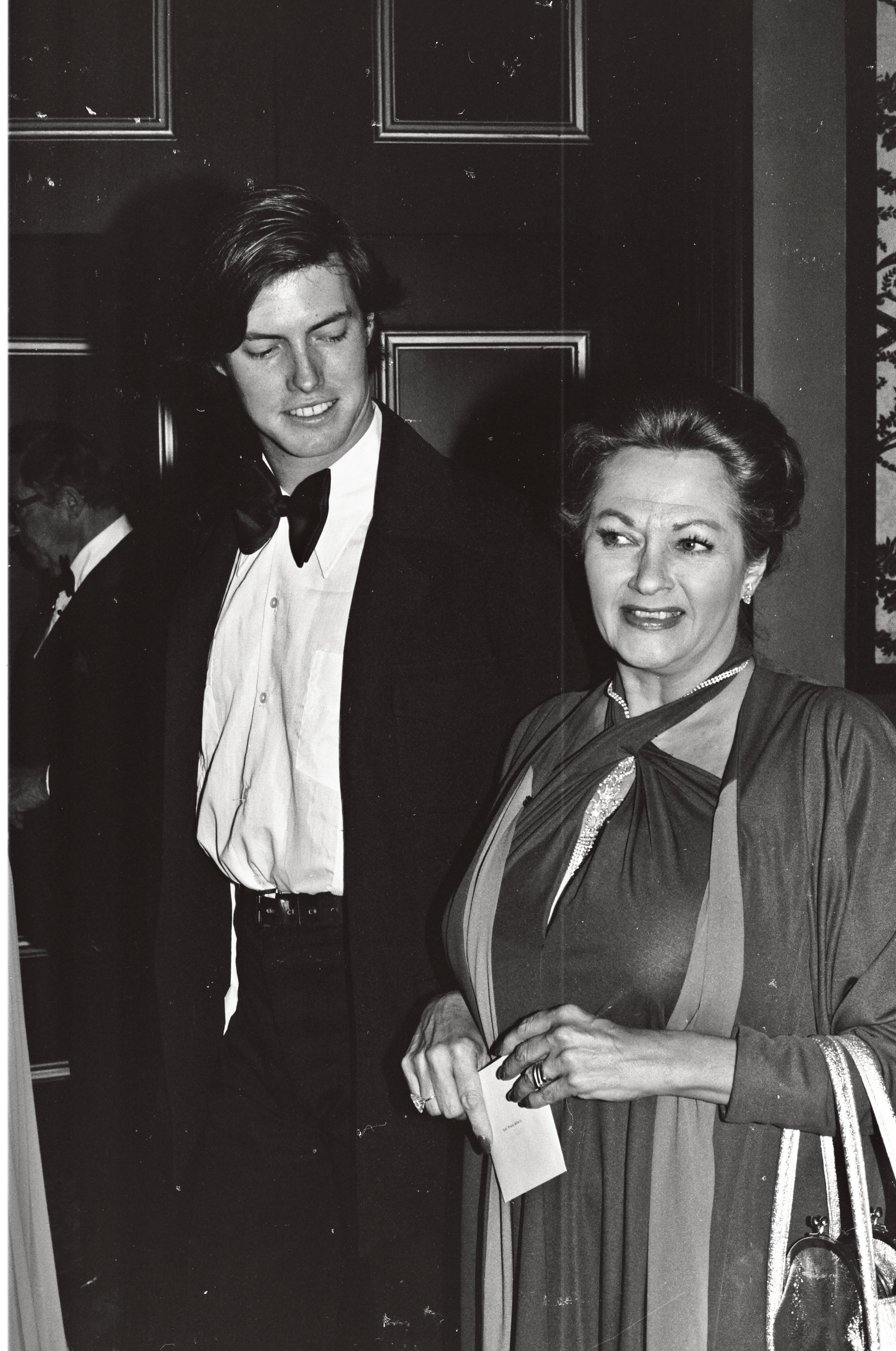
De Carlo and her first son at the National Film Society convention, May 1979

Bob Morgan was seriously injured and almost died while performing a stunt in the film How the West Was Won (1962). Toward the end of the film, a gunfight occurs on a moving train between the marshal and a gang of train robbers. Doubling for George Peppard, Morgan was told to hold on to a log and sway between two flatcars, one of them carrying several tons of timber. The chains holding the logs together snapped, and Morgan was crushed by the falling logs. He was so badly hurt, he needed five years to recover to the point where he was able to move by himself and walk unaided. Because his contract with MGM assumed no responsibility for the accident, De Carlo and Morgan filed a $1.4 million lawsuit against the studio, claiming her husband was permanently disabled.

After the accident, De Carlo worked arduously to support her family and was often away from home, touring with stage productions or performing in nightclubs. Morgan's continual arguing strained their marriage and De Carlo even considered divorcing her husband in 1968. When she returned home after a New Zealand tour of No, No, Nanette, she filed for divorce on the grounds of irreconcilable differences. They were divorced in July 1973.

=== Political views ===
De Carlo, a naturalized citizen of the United States, was an active Republican, who campaigned for Richard Nixon, Ronald Reagan, and Gerald Ford. In her autobiography, she recounted the time when she "loved to give interviews, and enjoyed being outspoken, or 'good copy,' openly discussing my survival instincts and admitting my to-the-right-of-right politics."

A conservative, she stated in a 1976 television interview with the CBC: "I'm all for men and I think they ought to stay up there and be the bosses, and have women wait on them hand and foot and put their slippers on and hand them the pipe and serve seven-course meals; as long as they open the door, support the woman, and do their duty in the bedroom, et cetera."

=== Religion ===
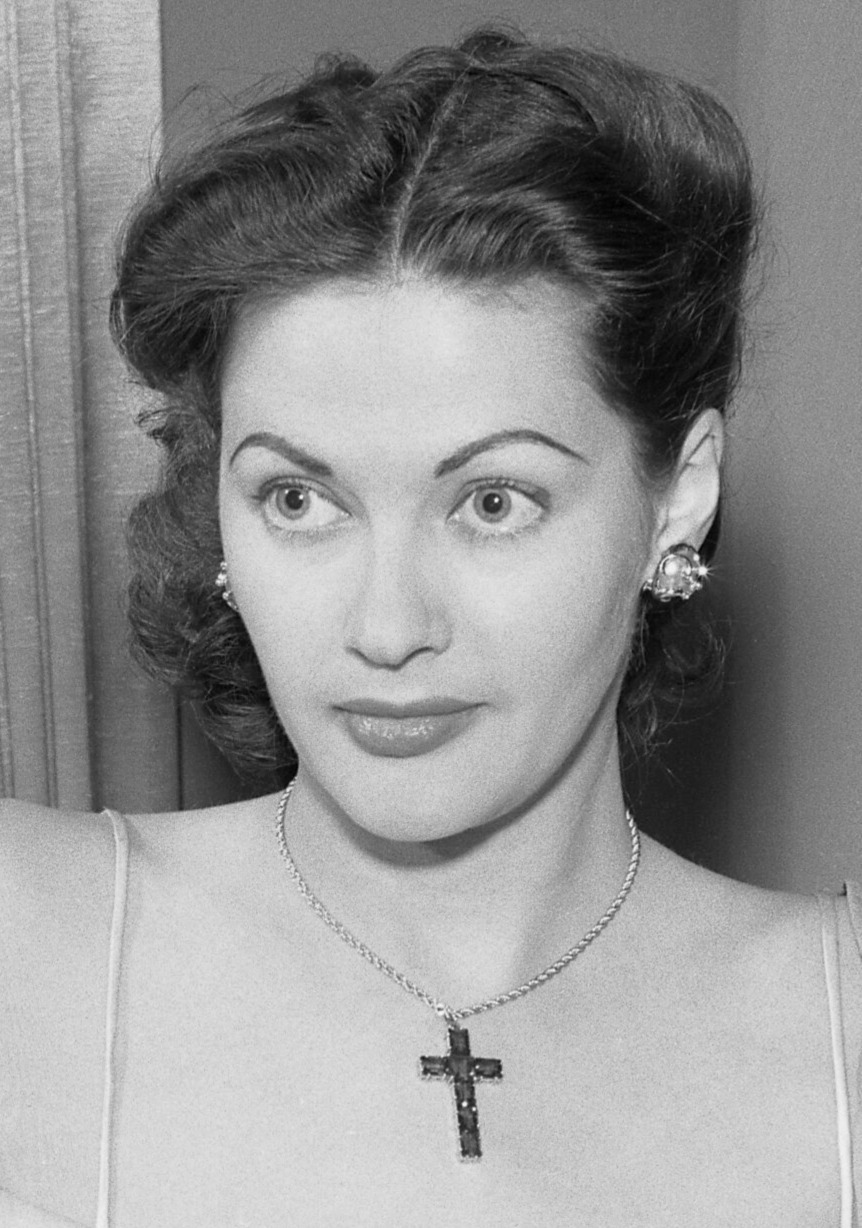
De Carlo wearing a necklace with the Christian cross, 1952

De Carlo's maternal grandparents came from distinct religious backgrounds: He was Catholic and she was Presbyterian. They raised her as an Anglican; she was a member and chorister of Vancouver's St. Paul's Anglican Church.

In May 1945, she told a magazine journalist that her "most prized possession" was a small white-leather Bible, a confirmation gift from her mother. She also revealed that the role she would like to portray most was Diana in Lloyd C. Douglas's 1942 Christian novel The Robe.

In October 1948, a Screenland writer stated that De Carlo was "doing a slow smoulder" because she "had her heart set on playing Delilah for C. B. De Mille" in his biblical epic Samson and Delilah, but lost the role to Hedy Lamarr.

In 1951, during her tour of Israel, she visited the village of Cana: "I saw the place where Christ turned the water into wine, and I couldn't help but think that some film company ought to go there and make the real story of the Bible." That same year, she also expressed interest in starring in a biblical film, explaining, "there's nothing dull about the Bible."

In the early 1980s, De Carlo began attending Bible classes with a close friend, Margie Evans. Evans inspired De Carlo to get closer to Christianity: "'You need Jesus,' she said to me. 'You need to take Him into your life and lean on Him.'" In her autobiography, De Carlo also wrote about her faith in God: "God has saved me and mine from some pretty sticky situations. For me, religion is a little like being a Republican or a Democrat. It's not the party that counts, it's the man. [...] I elected God a long time ago and I'll stick with Him, because I don't think His term will ever be up." She also said that she prayed whenever she had a problem in life: "I would go to a secluded spot—I'd pray for a solution. I'd also never forget to thank God for my blessings, whatever they were at the time."

=== Health and death ===
De Carlo suffered a minor stroke in 1998. She later became a resident of the Motion Picture and Television Country House and Hospital, in Woodland Hills, where she spent her last years. She died from heart failure on January 8, 2007, and her body was cremated.

== Awards and honors ==
- In 1946, Variety named her one of the three "top new Hollywood stars" of 1945, along with Lizabeth Scott and Lauren Bacall: "Miss de Carlo is definitely a personality. She has proved this in Universal's Salome, Where She Danced, and followed this appearance as star in [the] same company's Frontier Gal. She is a controversial figure, but she's managed to come out a star during discussions."
- She was a medalist in Boxoffice Barometer's The All-American Screen Favorites of 1946 list.
- She was a medalist in Boxoffice Barometer's The All-American Screen Favorites of 1947 list.
- In 1947, Max Factor's chief hair stylist, Fred Fredericks, named her one of the 10 "best tressed" film actresses.
- In 1950, the Camera Club of America voted her "Sexnicolor Queen of the Screen" "for putting more sex [appeal] into Technicolor than any other star."
- In 1957, she won a Laurel Award for Topliner Supporting Actress for The Ten Commandments (1956).
- In 1957, she received a BoxOffice Blue Ribbon Award for The Ten Commandments (1956).
- In 1960, she was awarded two stars on the Hollywood Walk of Fame. The motion picture star is on the south side of the 6100 block of Hollywood Boulevard. The television star is on the north side of the 6700 block of Hollywood Boulevard.
- In 1964, she received a second BoxOffice Blue Ribbon Award for McLintock! (1963).
- In 1966, she was honored by the City of Niagara Falls, Canada, for "having created good will for her native country and given inspiration to others."
- In 1966, she was named honorary mayor of North Hollywood, Los Angeles.
- In 1987, she won the International Science Fiction and Fantasy Film Show (Fantafestival) Award for Best Actress for American Gothic.
- In 2005, she was one of the 250 female Hollywood legends nominated for the American Film Institute's 100 Years ... 100 Stars list.
- In 2007, she was nominated for the "Who Knew They Could Sing?" TV Land Award for The Munsters.

== In popular culture ==
In the 1954 I Love Lucy episode "Ricky's Screen Test", Lucy reads in a newspaper that MGM is considering several Hollywood actresses, including Yvonne De Carlo, for the female lead role in Ricky's film Don Juan.

In the 1955 comedy film How to Be Very, Very Popular, Charles Coburn says, "He's been in the East somewhere. Arabia, Persia, one of those Yvonne De Carlo countries." De Carlo was famous for her roles in films with a North African/Middle Eastern setting, such as Song of Scheherazade, Casbah, The Desert Hawk, and Hotel Sahara.

== Discography ==
=== Singles ===
- "I Love a Man" / "Say Goodbye" (Columbia UK DB2850, 1950)
- "Take It Or Leave It" / "Three Little Stars" (Capitol F3206, 1955)
- "That's Love" / "The Secret of Love" (Imperial 5484, 1957)
- "I Would Give My Heart" / "Rockin' In The Orbit" (Imperial 5532, 1958)

=== Albums ===
- Yvonne De Carlo Sings (Masterseal, 1957)
- At Home With The Munsters (Golden Records, 1964)

=== Duets ===
- "You Belong to My Heart" with Bill Lee (included in That's Entertainment! The Ultimate Anthology of M-G-M Musicals)
- "Getting to Know You" with Frank Sinatra (included in The Frank Sinatra Duets)

== Bibliography ==
- Bawden, James; Miller, Ron (2017). "Yvonne De Carlo". You Ain't Heard Nothin' Yet: Interviews with Stars from Hollywood's Golden Era. University Press of Kentucky. ISBN 9780813174235.
- De Carlo, Yvonne; Warren, Doug (1987). Yvonne: An Autobiography. St. Martin's Press. ISBN 9780312002176.
- Foster, Charles (2003). "Yvonne De Carlo". Once Upon a Time in Paradise: Canadians in the Golden Age of Hollywood. Dundurn Press. ISBN 9781459712676.
- Orrison, Katherine (1999). "Mrs. Moses: Yvonne De Carlo". Written in Stone: Making Cecil B. DeMille's Epic The Ten Commandments. Vestal Press. ISBN 9781461734819.
- Thomas, Nick (2011). "Bruce Morgan on Yvonne De Carlo". Raised by the Stars: Interviews with 29 Children of Hollywood Actors. McFarland. ISBN 978-0-7864-6403-6.
