= Rusty Wescoatt =

American actor (1911–1987)

- Born: Norman Wescoatt; August 2, 1911; Maui, Hawaii, U.S.
- Died: September 3, 1987 (aged 76); Los Angeles, California, U.S.
- Education: University of Hawaii
- Occupation: Actor
- Years active: 1947–1965

Norman "Rusty" Wescoatt (August 2, 1911 – September 3, 1987) was an American supporting actor who appeared in over 80 films between 1947 and 1965.

== Early life ==
The son of Mr. and Mrs. W.W. Wescoatt, he was born on August 2, 1911, in Maui, Hawaii. He played football at McKinley High School and at the University of Hawaii.

Wescoatt spoke Hawaiian, Chinese, and Japanese.

== Athletics ==
On July 4, 1933, Wescoatt won his initial match as a professional wrestler, debuting in Honolulu, Hawaii. He went on to wrestle in New York, Boston, and other eastern cities, amassing a total of nearly 200 matches, 90 percent of which he won, by September 1936. Also in September 1936, he signed a contract with a new manager to move up to "a tour of some of the larger wrestling centers."

On Easter Sunday 1935, he set a record by swimming across the San Francisco Bay in two hours, 5 minutes.

== Acting ==
Wescoatt began his acting career with The Vigilante in 1947 as Garrity (uncredited). His next serial was The Sea Hound as Singapore Manson. In 1948, Wescoatt was in Superman, a 15-part black-and-white Columbia film serial, based on the comic book character Superman as Elton in chapters 7–15. In 1948, he was in Congo Bill as Ivan. He played a number of henchmen roles in B-Westerns and serials. Wescoatt's main studio for serial mayhem was Columbia. His screen persona was usually a bully who, often had more brawn than brains, did the physical labor according to the strict orders given by the brains heavy.

In 1950, Wescoatt was uncredited as Maklee Native in Jungle Manhunt. In 1955, he was in Gang Busters as Mike Denike (archive footage). Also in 1955, he was in Tarantula, a science fiction film from Universal-International, produced by William Alland, directed by Jack Arnold, as a driver (uncredited).

Wescoatt guest starred in a number of television shows including The Adventures of Kit Carson, The Lone Ranger, Death Valley Days, Hopalong Cassidy, Adventures of Wild Bill Hickok, Buffalo Bill, Jr., Sergeant Preston of the Yukon, Sky King, Gunsmoke, Perry Mason, 77 Sunset Strip, Maverick, Bat Masterson, The Twilight Zone, Lawman, and The Legend of Jesse James.

== Later years ==
In the 1960s, Wescoatt operated food markets in San Diego and Los Angeles.

== Death ==
Wescoatt died on September 3, 1987, in Los Angeles, California, at the age of 76.

== Selected appearances ==
=== Films ===
- The Sea Hound (1947, Serial) - Singapore Manson
- Tex Granger: Midnight Rider of the Plains (1948) - Henchman Reno (Ch's 5,11) (uncredited)
- Superman (1948, Serial) - Elton [Chs. 7-15]
- Congo Bill (1948, Serial) - Ivan
- Bruce Gentry (1949, Serial) - Henchman (uncredited)
- The Mutineers (1949) - Tom Jenkins (uncredited)
- Batman and Robin (1949, Serial) - Ives - Henchman [Chs. 3-13]
- The Adventures of Sir Galahad (1949, Serial) - Bartog's Hefty Thug (uncredited)
- Cody of the Pony Express (1950, Serial) - Denver - Hired Gunman [Ch.14]
- Jungle Jim's Captive Girl (1950) - Silva
- State Penitentiary (1950) - 'Flash' Russell - Convict (uncredited)
- Atom Man vs. Superman (1950, Serial) - Carl
- Sunset in the West (1950) - Henchman (uncredited)
- Chain Gang (1950) - Guard Yates (uncredited)
- Last of the Buccaneers (1950) - Col. Parnell (uncredited)
- Pirates of the High Seas (1950, Serial) - Adams - Phantom Cruiser Henchman
- Jungle Jim in Pygmy Island (1950) - Anders (uncredited)
- A Yank in Korea (1951) - Sgt. Hutton
- Fury of the Congo (1951) - Magruder
- Roar of the Iron Horse (1951, Serial) - Scully - Lathrop's Foreman
- When the Redskins Rode (1951) - Znueau (uncredited)
- Hurricane Island (1951) - Crandall (uncredited)
- Mysterious Island (1951, Serial) - Moley - Shard Henchman
- Jungle Manhunt (1951) - Maklee Native (uncredited)
- Captain Video (1951, Serial) - Henchman Beal [Chs. 1, 7, 11]
- King of the Congo (1952, Serial) - Kor
- Thief of Damascus (1952) - Soldier (uncredited)
- Brave Warrior (1952) - Standish
- The Golden Hawk (1952) - Pirate (uncredited)
- Pack Train (1953) - Tall Burly Henchman (uncredited)
- Riding with Buffalo Bill (1954) - Henchman (uncredited)
- The Yellow Mountain (1954) - Miner (uncredited)
- The Snow Creature (1954) - Guard in Warehouse
- Sign of the Pagan (1954) - Tula
- The Big Bluff (1955) - Frank
- Gang Busters (1955) - Helmsman (uncredited)
- Tarantula (1955) - Pickup Driver (uncredited)
- Perils of the Wilderness (1956, Serial) - Henchman (uncredited)
- Red Sundown (1956) - Bartender (uncredited)
- The Big Caper (1957) - Plainclothesman Outside Bank (uncredited)
- Snowfire (1957) - Link Stoner
- Touch of Evil (1958) - Detective Casey (uncredited)
- The Three Stooges Meet Hercules (1959) - Townsman (uncredited)
- The Silent Call (1961) - Moose
- 20,000 Eyes (1961) - Policeman
- The Three Stooges Meet Hercules (1962) - Philo (uncredited)
- The Three Stooges in Orbit (1962) - Cook (uncredited)
- Black Gold (1962) - Wilkins
- Gypsy (1962) - Stagehand (uncredited)
- The Young Swingers (1963) - Policeman
- Morituri (1965) - Merchant Marine (uncredited)

=== TV shows ===
- The Adventures of Kit Carson (1952-1953) - Tom / Milt / Henchman / Big Henchman / Gustavo Morales aka Chico Grande
- The Lone Ranger (1952) - Sergeant
- Death Valley Days (1952-1959) - Rusty / Stoney / Finn / Fireman / Pete / Barkeeper / Red / Townsman / Hank Lewis / Frank / Charlie Flack / Barfly / Dirk
- The Gene Autry Show (1953) - Henchman Ed / Cole, Beefy Henchman in Checked Shirt
- Hopalong Cassidy (1953) - Brawler in Bank
- The Roy Rogers Show (1953-1957) - Henchman Pete / Henchman Hal Jessup / Lefty Young / Henchman Hank / Fred Willow / Joe Burnside / Outlaw Leader
- Adventures of Wild Bill Hickok (1953-1958) - Fake Red Beard / Ben
- Captain Midnight (1954) - Davis
- Buffalo Bill, Jr. (1955) - Wagon Driver
- Sergeant Preston of the Yukon (1956) - One Punch Madigan
- The Adventures of Rin Tin Tin (1955-1958) - Portchey / Clem Wharton / Windom
- Sky King (1956–1959) - Varner / Red Forrest / Second Man / Frisco / Pete
- Gunsmoke (1957) - Gere
- Tales of the Texas Rangers (1957) - Blackie
- Perry Mason (1957) - Sgt. Holcomb
- 77 Sunset Strip (1958) - Garbage Man
- Maverick (1958-1960) - Referee / Muldoon / Ben Thompson / Gang Member / Gus Shaughnessy / Burly Stagecoach Passenger
- Bat Masterson (1959-1960) - Henchman / Kickapoo Smith
- The Twilight Zone (1960) - Tall Man
- Surfside 6 (1960) - Pug Garnes
- Lawman (1962) - Blacksmith
- The Legend of Jesse James (1965) - Blacksmith (final appearance)
