= Arthur Blake (American actor) =

American actor and nightclub entertainer (1914–1985)

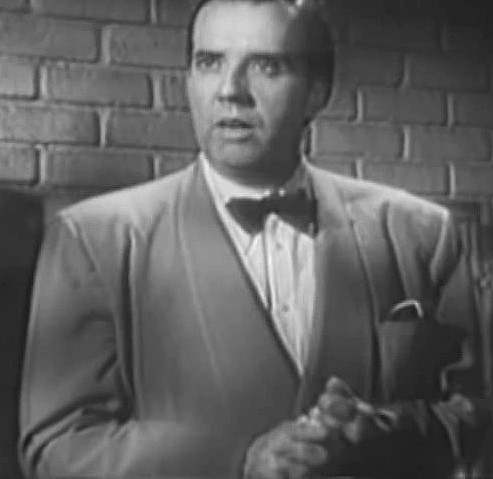
- Blake in Port of New York (1949)
- Born: Arthur Blakely Clark; February 24, 1914; Altoona, Pennsylvania, U.S.
- Died: March 24, 1985 (aged 71); Fort Lauderdale, Florida, U.S.
- Occupation: Actor
- Years active: ca. 1934-1972

Arthur Blake (February 24, 1914 – March 24, 1985) was an American actor who was famous as a drag queen, particularly impersonating Bette Davis, Carmen Miranda, and Eleanor Roosevelt. He performed in nightclubs in cities throughout the United States and United Kingdom in the 1940s and the 1950s. Although he achieved fame for playing women, he impersonated men as well in his act.

Also a film actor, he is best remembered for the films Port of New York (1949, as Dolly Carney), Cyrano de Bergerac (1950, as Montfleury), Harem Girl (1952, as Abdul Nassib), and Diplomatic Courier (1952, as Max Ralli). In the latter film, his impersonations of Davis and Miranda were featured. In the 1960s and 1970s he was the headliner at the LGBTQ nightclub Crown & Anchor in Provincetown, Massachusetts.

== Life and career ==
Born Arthur Blakely Clark in Altoona, Pennsylvania, Blake was one of the few female impersonators of the post-World War II era to achieve success in both gay and mainstream entertainment. In the 1940s and 1950s he was a popular nightclub entertainer in London and other cities in the United Kingdom, as well as in the United States. He was one of the headlining acts at the Rio Casino at Cocoanut Grove on the night of the infamous fire in 1942. For twenty years he was the leading entertainer of the Crown & Anchor nightclub, serving the LGBTQ community, in Provincetown, Massachusetts, in the 1960s and 1970s.

Blake's nightclub act included impersonations of multiple famous women; including Tallulah Bankhead, Katharine Hepburn, Hedda Hopper, Beatrice Lillie, Edna Mae Oliver, Louella Parsons, ZaSu Pitts, Barbara Stanwyck, Gloria Swanson and Sophie Tucker. Of all the women he portrayed, he was most celebrated for his portrayals of Bette Davis, Carmen Miranda, and Eleanor Roosevelt. His impersonation of Roosevelt led to an invitation from the First Lady and President Franklin D. Roosevelt to perform for them in the East Room of the White House while they were in office. Bette Davis stated the following in an interview,

People think I don't like those impersonators who do me. Well, they're wrong. I like it very much, as long as they are very good. The only time I don't like it is if they aren't good, or, worse, if they're better than I am. I watch them to learn about myself. Until I saw Arthur Blake, I never knew I moved my elbows so much.

Although he achieved fame for playing women, his nightclub act also included impersonations of male celebrities such as Lionel Barrymore, Raymond Burr, Peter Lorre, Frank Morgan, Jimmy Stewart, Clifton Webb, and Orson Welles. He recorded a 1957 LP with Starcrest Records, Curtain Time: The Satirical Impressions of Arthur Blake, that features him performing monologues and songs of both male and female celebrities.

Blake appeared in mostly minor character roles in several classical Hollywood films; including Little Lord Fauntleroy (1936, as Party Guest), Lloyd's of London (1936, as Jonathan's Syndicate), The Lion Man (1936), Souls at Sea (1937, as Prime Minister), Madame X (1937, as Ferguson), Sherlock Holmes and the Voice of Terror (1942, as Crosbie), Now, Voyager (1941), The Purple V (1943, as British General), Gaslight (1944, as the Butler), National Velvet (1944), The Man in Half Moon Street (1945), Ministry of Fear (1944), Down to Earth (1947, as Nathaniel Somerset), Unconquered (1947), and All About Eve (1950). He had more substantial parts in Port of New York (1949, as Dolly Carney), Cyrano de Bergerac (1950, as Montfleury), Harem Girl (1952, as Abdul Nassib), and Diplomatic Courier (1952, as Max Ralli). In the latter film, his character Max does impersonations of Carmen Miranda, F.D.R., and Bette Davis.

In 1972 Blake starred in the Off-Broadway musical revue They Don't Make Em Like That Anymore at the Plaza 9 Music Hall with Luba Lisa. The show was built around Blake's impersonations of celebrities like Marlene Dietrich and Noël Coward.

He died in 1985 of a heart attack in Fort Lauderdale, Florida, at the age of 70.
