= Hurricane Island =

1951 film by Lew Landers

- Directed by: Lew Landers
- Written by: David Mathews
- Produced by: Sam Katzman
- Starring: Jon Hall; Marie Windsor; Edgar Barrier
- Cinematography: Lester White
- Edited by: Richard Fantl
- Production company: Esskay Pictures Corporation
- Distributed by: Columbia Pictures
- Release date: July 16, 1951
- Running time: 71 minutes
- Country: United States
- Language: English

Hurricane Island is a 1951 American Supercinecolor adventure film directed by Lew Landers and starring Jon Hall.

== Plot ==
Juan Ponce de León searches for the Fountain of Youth but faces difficulty with bad weather, a treacherous lady pirate, warring Florida tribesmen and a ship's cargo of man-crazy, marriage-minded maidens.

== Cast ==
- Jon Hall as Captain Carlos Montalvo
- Marie Windsor as Jane Bolton
- Romo Vincent as José
- Edgar Barrier as Ponce de Leon
- Karen Randle as Maria
- Jo Gilbert as Okahla
- Nelson Leigh as Padre

== Production ==
The film was announced in March 1950 with Robert E. Kent originally reported as writing the script. It was the first in a new three-film contract between Hall and producer Sam Katzman. They later produced Brave Warrior (1952) and Last Train from Bombay (1952).
