= Donald Randolph =

South African actor (1906–1993)

- Donald Randolph in Perry Mason (1958)
- Born: January 5, 1906; Cape Town, South Africa
- Died: March 16, 1993 (aged 87); Los Angeles, California, U.S.
- Occupation: Actor
- Years active: 1932-1975

Donald Randolph (January 5, 1906 – March 16, 1993) was a film, television, and radio actor. The actor acted in films, in dozens of radio dramas, television programs and over thirty films.

== Career ==
Randolph debuted on Broadway in Fatal Alibi (1932). His other Broadway credits include I Like It Here (1945), The Naked Genius (1943), The Sun Field (1942), Yours, A. Lincoln (1942), Lady in the Dark (1940), King Richard II (1939), Hamlet (1939), King Richard II (1936), Crime Marches on (1935) and Strange Gods (1932).

In 1950, he appeared in The Desert Hawk. In 1957, he appeared as General Mark Ford in the science fiction classic, The Deadly Mantis. 1969 he had a supporting role in Alfred Hitchcock's Topaz (1969),

With his resonant voice, Randolph performed in numerous radio dramas broadcast during the 1940s and 1950s.

His television work included two episodes of Perry Mason; he played the role of the murderer Stephen Argyle in the 1958 episode, "The Case of the Cautious Coquette", and in 1959 he played the murder victim Curtis Runyan in "The Case of the Spanish Cross". He appeared on "Have Gun Will Travel" S2 E19 "The Monster" as Don Francisco, which first aired on 1/14/1960. In 1968 Randolph appeared (credited as Don Randolph) as Don Ramon Monteja on The Big Valley in the episode titled "Miranda."

== Death ==
On March 16, 1993, Randolph died of pneumonia in Los Angeles. He was 87.

== Papers ==
Some of Randolph's papers are housed at the UCLA Library Special Collections.

== Filmography ==
- 13 Rue Madeleine (1946) - La Roche (uncredited)
- For the Love of Mary (1948) - Asst. Attorney General
- Bride of Vengeance (1949) - Tiziano
- Rogues of Sherwood Forest (1950) - Archbishop Stephen Langton
- The Desert Hawk (1950) - Caliph
- Gambling House (1951) - Lloyd Crane
- Flame of Stamboul (1951) - Hassan
- Fourteen Hours (1951) - Dr. Benson
- The Prince Who Was a Thief (1951) - Prince Mustapha
- The Golden Horde (1951) - Torga
- Ten Tall Men (1951) - Yussif
- Harem Girl (1952) - Jamal
- The Brigand (1952) - Don Felipe Castro
- Assignment – Paris! (1952) - Anton Borvitch
- Night Without Sleep (1952) - Dr. Clarke
- Gunsmoke (1953) - Matt Telford
- Dream Wife (1953) - Ali
- The Caddy (1953) - Harvey Miller Sr.
- All American (1953) - David Carter
- The Mad Magician (1954) - Ross Ormond
- The Gambler from Natchez (1954) - Pierre Bonet
- Khyber Patrol (1954) - Prince Ishak Khan
- The Adventures of Hajji Baba (1954) - Caliph
- Phffft (1954) - Dr. Van Kessel
- The Silver Chalice (1954) - Selech
- Chief Crazy Horse (1955) - Aaron Cartwright
- Son of Sinbad (1955) - Councillor
- The Purple Mask (1955) - Andre Majolin
- The Rawhide Years (1956) - Carrico
- Over-Exposed (1956) - Coco Fields
- The Deadly Mantis (1957) - Maj. Gen. Mark Ford
- My Gun Is Quick (1957) - Colonel Holloway
- Cowboy (1958) - Señor Vidal, Maria's Father
- Topaz (1969) - Luis Uribe
