= The Invisible Man's Revenge =

1944 film by Ford Beebe

- Film poster
- Directed by: Ford Beebe
- Screenplay by: Bertram Millhauser
- Produced by: Ford Beebe
- Starring: Jon Hall; Leon Errol; John Carradine; Alan Curtis
- Cinematography: Milton Krasner
- Edited by: Saul A. Goodkind
- Music by: Hans J. Salter
- Production company: Universal Pictures Company, Inc.
- Distributed by: Universal Pictures Company, Inc.
- Release date: 9 June 1944
- Running time: 77 minutes
- Country: United States
- Budget: $314,790
- Box office: $765,700

The Invisible Man's Revenge is a 1944 American science fiction horror film directed by Ford Beebe and written by Bertram Millhauser. The film stars John Carradine as a scientist who tests his experiment on a psychiatric hospital escapee, played by Jon Hall, who takes the invisibility serum and then goes on a crime spree. It is the fifth film in the Invisible Man film series, loosely based on the novel by H. G. Wells.

The film was announced on June 10, 1943, and began shooting on January 10, 1944, finishing in mid-February. On its release, reviews in The New York Herald-Tribune, The New York Daily News and The New York World-Telegram noted that the film series and its special effects became tired, while a review in The Hollywood Reporter declared it as one of the best in the series.

== Plot ==
After murdering two orderlies, Robert Griffin escapes from the Cape Town mental institution where he was committed, intent on revenge on the Herrick family. One night, Sir Jasper Herrick and his wife Lady Irene engage in inspecting the new boyfriend of their daughter Julie, journalist Mark Foster. Later, Julie and Mark leave the family residence, and Jasper and Irene are left alone. That is when Robert decides to pay the couple a visit. He enters the residence and accuses them of leaving him to die out injured in Africa, when they were on a safari together. The couple defends themselves, claiming they were told that he was dead and not injured, but Robert does not believe them. He demands they give him his share of the diamond fields they discovered together on the safari. Jasper tries to tell Robert that that property was lost in a series of bad investments. Robert refuses to give in, threatening to sue the Herricks, and to calm him down, they offer him a share in an estate, the Shortlands. His counter-proposal is that they should arrange for him to be married to Julie. After saying this, he is drugged by Lady Irene and passes out in their home. The Herricks realize that Robert has gone completely mad, and despite being frightened of what he could do to them if they do not obey him, they see no problem with stealing the agreement made or pushing him further along the path of insanity with their betrayal. They search Robert's clothes and find the written partnership agreement they all entered into some time ago. Taking the paper, they next throw Robert out of their house. Robert nearly drowns where he lies unconscious but is saved by Herbert Higgins, a local Cockney cobbler.

Herbert decides to use the information he gets from Robert to blackmail the Herricks. He is unsuccessful, as Jasper calls on chief constable Sir Frederick Travers. The chief constable declares Robert's claims as void and orders him to leave his jurisdiction. Robert leaves for London, but on his way he happens to come by the home of shady scientist Dr. Peter Drury. Drury is eager to find a suitable subject to test his new experimental formula on - a formula for invisibility. Robert asks that the doctor try it on him, and he agrees, not knowing that Robert wants to use this to get his revenge. Robert forces Jasper to sign over their entire estate to him. He also finds time to help his saviour Herbert win a game of darts at an inn. Jasper secretly agrees to give his daughter's hand in marriage to Robert - if he ever regains his visibility. Robert goes back to Drury's laboratory and witnesses how the doctor restores visibility to his dog Brutus, by giving him a blood transfusion. Robert knocks Drury unconscious, before performing a transfusion on himself, using the doctor's blood. The transfusion results in Drury's death, and to avoid capture, Robert sets the laboratory on fire and takes off just before the police arrive.

Robert changes his identity to "Martin Field" and moves in with the Herricks at the estate which he is now owner of. When Herbert finds out about Robert's return he makes a futile attempt to blackmail him too, and out of pity - and perhaps thankfulness - Robert pays the man one thousand pounds to get rid of him. Robert has one condition for paying the money: that Herbert kills Brutus, who has followed Robert back to the estate after the fire. Robert starts losing his visibility one day at the breakfast table, with Julie and her fiancé Mark present. He tricks Mark to follow him down into the wine cellar and knocks the man out, starting another transfusion with Mark's blood. Travers arrives at the estate after finding out about Robert's return. Aided by Herbert and Jasper, he breaks into the cellar just as the transfusion is about to be completed, in time to save Mark's life. Robert is then attacked by Brutus and killed.

== Cast ==
- Jon Hall as Robert Griffin Aka The Invisible Man
- Leon Errol as Herbert Higgins, Robert's Lackey
- John Carradine as Dr. Peter Drury, a mad scientist who has discovered the invisibility formula
- Alan Curtis as Mark Foster, Julie's Boyfriend
- Evelyn Ankers as Julie Herrick, Irene and Jasper's Daughter
- Gale Sondergaard as Lady Irene Herrick, Jasper's Wife
- Lester Matthews as Sir Jasper Herrick, Irene's Husband and Robert's Former Friend
- Halliwell Hobbes as Cleghorn, the Herrick's butler
- Leyland Hodgson as Sir Frederick Travers, Jasper's Friend
- Doris Lloyd as Maud, the barmaid
- Ian Wolfe as Jim Feeney, a lawyer
- Billy Bevan as The Police Sergeant
- Jimmy Aubrey as Wedderhorn, the tavern keeper
- Tom Dillon as man who loses to Higgins at darts
- Grey Shadow as Brutus, Dr. Drury's Dog
  - Although Dr. Drury calls the dog Brutus in the film, the canine actor is given a "Himself" credit as Grey Shadow.

== Production ==
Universal first announced the plan for The Invisible Man's Revenge on June 10, 1943, with the hopes of having Claude Rains perform in the lead, as he had in the 1933 film. Other cast members who were lined up for the film were Edgar Barrier who opted out of the production on January 6, after being disenchanted with the roles he had in films like Phantom of the Opera and Cobra Woman.

Jon Hall had also played an Invisible Man character for Universal in Invisible Agent (1942), two years before this film.

Prior to the first day of shooting the film, Universal's attorneys made a deal with H. G. Wells for the rights to make two more Invisible Man sequels between July 1943 and October 1951. Production on the film began on January 10, 1944, and continued for five weeks and three days finishing in mid-February. After this, John P. Fulton took over to complete the special effects sequences. The film's final cost was $314,790.

== Release ==
The Invisible Man's Revenge was distributed theatrically by the Universal Pictures Company on June 9, 1944. The film's worldwide gross was $765,700. The film was released on DVD on as part of the "Invisible Man: The Legacy Collection" set, which included The Invisible Man, The Invisible Man Returns, The Invisible Woman and Invisible Agent. It was released again on Blu-ray as part of the "Invisible Man: The Complete Legacy Collection" on August 28, 2018.

== Reception ==
From contemporary reviews, Howard Barnes of The New York Herald-Tribune found the film "singularly unexciting" finding John Fulton's special photography as "the most striking aspect of the picture [but] the tricks have been done too often before by the camera to make them particularly effective by themselves". Wanda Hale of The New York Daily News echoed this statement, finding that "the frightening creature [...] is no novelty" and that the film was "not the stimulating thriller that The Invisible Man was". A reviewer in The New York World-Telegram declared that "some of the earlier variations of H.G. Wells' invisible man idea were filmed with an idea that the story should make good sense. That policy has been abandoned this time" while still noting that Jon Hall was being "a much more effective actor than he has been in some of his recent adventures in gaudy Technicolor". Conversely, a reviewer from The Hollywood Reporter declared it as one "of the best and most entertaining of the series".

From retrospective reviews, the authors of the book Universal Horrors declared the film to be "the least ambitious but hardly the least entertaining of Universal's widely varying series" noting its "no frills approach to its subject matter", declaring it better than The Invisible Woman and Invisible Agent but not as strong as The Invisible Man or The Invisible Man Returns. Special effects in the film were described as "have a slapdash quality" with only a few pulling of "startlingly effective tricks".

Actor John Carradine, who loathed the horror films he worked in, was asked in the British fanzine House of Hammer if he liked any of the horror films he was in, and he responded he enjoyed The Invisible Man's Revenge.

== See also ==
- List of American films of 1944
