= Deputy Marshal =

1949 film

- Theatrical release poster
- Directed by: William Berke
- Screenplay by: William Berke
- Based on: novel Deputy Marshal by Charles Heckleman
- Produced by: William Stephens
- Starring: Jon Hall; Frances Langford; Dick Foran
- Cinematography: Carl Berger
- Edited by: Edward Mann
- Music by: Mahlon Merrick
- Production company: Lippert Pictures
- Distributed by: Screen Guild Productions
- Release date: October 28, 1949 (United States)
- Running time: 60 minutes 69 minutes (DVD)
- Country: United States
- Language: English
- Budget: $400,000-$500,000

Deputy Marshal is a 1949 American Western film directed by William Berke and starring Jon Hall, Frances Langford, and Dick Foran.

The film was a more expensive production that usual from Robert L. Lippert, who originally hoped for Rod Cameron or George Montgomery.

== Plot ==
A lawman (Jon Hall) tracks bank robbers to Wyoming and gets wind of railroad-land scam.

== Cast ==
- Jon Hall as Deputy Ed Garry
- Frances Langford as Janet Masters
- Dick Foran as Joel Benton/Jed Northey
- Julie Bishop as Claire Benton
- Joe Sawyer as Eli Cressett/Colt Redword
- Russell Hayden as Bill Masters
- Clem Bevans as Doc Allen Vinson
- Vince Barnett as Hotel Desk Clark
- Mary Gordon as Mrs. Lance
- Stanley Blystone as Leo Harrold
- Keene Duncan as Cal Freelong
- Roy Butler as Deputy Sheriff Weed Toler
- Wheaton Chambers as Harley Masters
- Forrest Taylor as Sheriff Jeff Lance

== Production ==
Filming started 6 July 1949.
