= Men in Her Diary =

1945 film by Charles Barton

- Directed by: Charles Barton
- Screenplay by: Lester Cole; F. Hugh Herbert; Elwood Ullman
- Based on: story by Kerry Shaw
- Produced by: Charles Barton
- Starring: Jon Hall
- Production company: Universal Pictures
- Distributed by: Universal Pictures
- Release date: 14 September 1945
- Running time: 73 minutes
- Country: United States
- Language: English

Men in Her Diary is a 1945 American comedy film. It stars Peggy Ryan and Jon Hall and was written by Lester Cole and directed by Charles Barton. It followed from the success of San Diego, I Love You.

== Cast ==
- Jon Hall
- Peggy Ryan
- Louise Allbritton
- Alan Mowbray

== Production ==
It was filmed in February 1945.

== Reception ==
The New York Times called it "as substantial as the froth on schooner of beer and just about as effective."
