= China Corsair =

1951 film by Ray Nazarro

- Directed by: Ray Nazarro
- Written by: Harold R. Greene
- Produced by: Rudolph C. Flothow
- Starring: Jon Hall; Lisa Ferraday
- Cinematography: Philip Tannura
- Edited by: Richard Fantl
- Distributed by: Columbia Pictures
- Release date: June 12, 1951
- Running time: 76 minutes
- Country: United States
- Language: English

China Corsair is a 1951 American adventure film directed by Ray Nazarro, starring Jon Hall and Lisa Ferraday and released by Columbia Pictures. It marks the film debut of Ernest Borgnine. Filming took place in February 1951.

== Plot ==
In a gambling club, McMillen is cheated of his winnings, which were the last of his money. He takes a job on a ship as an engineer, but his ship wrecks and Tamara rescues him. While romance blossoms, they try to prevent a crook from selling Tamara's uncle's priceless collection of antique jade.

== Cast ==
- Jon Hall as McMillan
- Lisa Ferraday as Tamara
- Ron Randell as Paul Lowell
- Douglas Kennedy as Capt. Frenchy
- Ernest Borgnine as Hu Chang
- John Dehner as Pedro
- Marya Marco as Lotus
- Philip Ahn as Wong San
- Peter Mamakos as Juan
- Amanda Blake as Jane Richards

== Reception ==
The New York Daily News described the film as "a preposterous affair" and Borgnine's role as unconvincing.
