= Invisible Agent =

1942 film

- Directed by: Edwin L. Marin
- Screenplay by: Curt Siodmak
- Based on: The Invisible Man inspired by 1897 novel by H. G. Wells
- Produced by: Frank Lloyd
- Starring: Ilona Massey; Jon Hall; Peter Lorre; Sir Cedric Hardwicke; J. Edward Bromberg; John Litel; Albert Basserman
- Cinematography: Les White
- Edited by: Edward Curtiss
- Production companies: Universal Pictures Company, Inc.; Frank Lloyd Productions, Inc.
- Distributed by: Universal Pictures Company, Inc.
- Release date: July 31, 1942
- Running time: 79 minutes
- Country: United States
- Language: English
- Budget: $322,291
- Box office: $1,041,500

Invisible Agent is a 1942 American action and spy film directed by Edwin L. Marin with a screenplay written by Curt Siodmak. The invisible agent is played by Jon Hall, with Peter Lorre and Sir Cedric Hardwicke as members of the Axis, and Ilona Massey and Albert Basserman as Allied spies. The film is inspired by the 1897 H. G. Wells novel The Invisible Man.

== Plot ==
Frank Griffin Jr, the grandson of the original Invisible Man, runs a print shop in Manhattan under the assumed name of Frank Raymond (Jon Hall). One evening, he is confronted in his shop by four armed men who reveal that they are foreign agents working for the Axis powers and they know his true identity. One of the men, Conrad Stauffer (Cedric Hardwicke), is a lieutenant general of the S.S., while a second, Baron Ikito (Peter Lorre), is Japanese. They offer to pay for the invisibility formula and threaten amputation of his fingers if it is not revealed. Griffin manages to escape with the formula. Griffin is reluctant to release the formula to the U.S. government officials, but following the Attack on Pearl Harbor agrees to limited cooperation (the condition being that the formula can only be used on himself). Later, while in-flight to be parachuted behind German lines on a secret mission, he injects himself with the serum, becoming invisible as he is parachuting down, to the shock and confusion of the German troops tracking his descent, and after landing strips off all of his clothing.

Griffin evades the troops and makes contact with an old coffin-maker named Arnold Schmidt (Albert Basserman), who reveals the next step of Griffin's mission. Griffin is to obtain a list of German and Japanese spies within the U.S. in the possession of Stauffer. Griffin is aided in his task by Maria Sorenson (Ilona Massey), a German espionage agent and the love interest of both Stauffer and Stauffer's well-connected second-in-command, Gestapo Standartenführer Karl Heiser (J. Edward Bromberg). According to their plan, Sorenson attempts to gain information from Heiser during a private dinner, with Griffin as witness. Drunk from champagne, Griffin uses his invisibility to play tricks on Heiser instead. Finally enraged when the dinner table mysteriously tips and soils his uniform, Heiser places Sorenson under house-arrest. Later, an apologetic Griffin demonstrates his existence to Sorenson by putting on a robe and smearing facial cream on his features. The two are attracted to each other.

Conrad Stauffer returns from his efforts in the United States and tries to manage his shifting alliances with Karl Heiser, Maria Sorenson, and Baron Ikito. When he learns of Heiser's disastrous romantic dinner with Sorenson, Stauffer has Karl Heiser arrested and baits a trap for Griffin, whom he comes to suspect has made contact with Maria. Despite walking into Stauffer's trap, Griffin manages to obtain the list of agents, and start a fire to cover his escape. Griffin takes the list of agents to Arnold Schmidt for transmission to England. Conrad Stauffer tries to hide the loss of the list from the prying Baron Ikito, who has been staying at the local Japanese Embassy. When Stauffer refuses to answer Ikito's questions, the two confess to each other that German and Japanese cooperation is not one of trust. Without revealing their plans to each other, both men start separate hunts for the Invisible Agent. Griffin steals into a German prison to obtain information from Karl Heiser about a planned German attack on New York City. In exchange for additional information, Griffin helps Heiser escape his imminent execution. Griffin returns with Heiser to Schmidt, who in the meantime has been arrested and tortured by Stauffer. At the shop, Griffin confronts Maria Sorenson, whom he suspects has betrayed Schmidt, and is captured with a net trap by Ikito's men.

Heiser escapes detection and attempts to save his life and career by phoning in Ikito's activities to Stauffer. Griffin and Sorensen are taken to the Japanese embassy, but manage to escape during the mayhem that ensues when Stauffer's men arrive. For their joint failure to safeguard the list of Axis agents, Ikito kills Stauffer and then performs seppuku, ritual suicide, as Heiser watches from the shadows. Assuming command, Heiser arrives too late to the local air base to stop Griffin and Sorenson from escaping. The couple acquires one of the bombers slated for the New York attack, and destroy other German planes on the ground as they fly to England. Stauffer's loyal men catch up with Karl Heiser and he is shot. Griffin loses consciousness before he can radio ahead. England's air defense shoots down their craft, but not before Sorenson parachutes them to safety. Later, in a hospital, Griffin has recovered and is wearing facial cream so that he can be visible again. Sorenson appears with Griffin's American handler, who vouches for Sorenson that she has been an Allied double-agent all along. Sorenson is left alone with Griffin who reveals that he is actually visible under the facial cream, and they kiss. Sorenson happily accepts the challenge of discovering how Griffin regained his visibility.

== Cast ==
- Jon Hall as Frank "Raymond" Griffin / The Invisible Man
- Ilona Massey as Maria Sorenson
- Peter Lorre as Baron Ikito
- Cedric Hardwicke as Gestapo Gruppenführer Conrad Stauffer
- J. Edward Bromberg as Gestapo Standartenführer Karl Heiser
- John Litel as John Gardiner
- Albert Bassermann as Dr. Schmidt
- Holmes Herbert as Sir Alfred Spencer
- Keye Luke as Surgeon

== Production ==
By 1942, the United States had entered World War II, leading studios to produce films that were described by the authors of the book Universal Horrors as replacing the "cynicism of the '30s" with the "flag-waving of the '40s". This led to a combination of "horror and propaganda" that the authors described as an "uncomfortable hybrid". These films included productions at Monogram such as King of the Zombies, Black Dragons and Revenge of the Zombies with mad scientists who also worked for Nazis. Universal also made an entry into this hybrid with Invisible Agent. James L. Neibaur, author of The Monster Movies of Universal Studios described the film as not being a horror film, but more of "an action-adventure movie with a few comical touches".

Invisible Agent was announced under the title The Invisible Spy in early 1942. The screenwriting team of Frank Lloyd and Jack Skirball, who previously worked on Alfred Hitchcock's Saboteur, were set to be the film's original producers but were replaced by George Waggner who was assigned the title of associate producer. The film's screenplay by Curt Siodmak has only one connection to the original Invisible Man film, with the "Frank Raymond" character who is the grandson of "Jack Griffin", the inventor of the invisibility formula. The film went into production on April 22 and finished in late May 1942 with a budget of $322,291.

Jon Hall had just been put under contract to Universal.

== Release ==
Invisible Agent was distributed by the Universal Pictures Company on July 31, 1942. The film was the most successful of the Invisible Man sequels and one of Universal's highest-grossing films of the season, grossing over $1,000,000 in US rentals, earning $1,041,500.

John P. Fulton and Bernard B. Brown were nominated for an Academy Award for their special effects work on this film at the 15th Academy Awards, but lost to the special effects team for Paramount's Reap the Wild Wind. The film was followed by the sequel, The Invisible Man's Revenge also starring Jon Hall.

The film was released on DVD on as part of the "Invisible Man: The Legacy Collection" set, which included The Invisible Man, The Invisible Man Returns, The Invisible Woman and The Invisible Man's Revenge. It was released again on Blu-ray as part of the "Invisible Man: The Complete Legacy Collection" on August 28, 2018.

== Reception ==
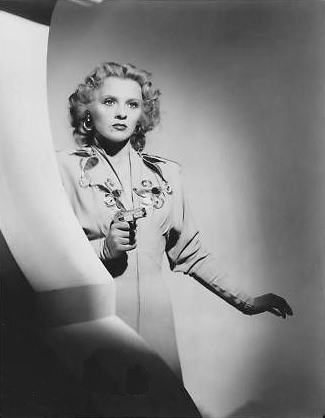
A promotional image for the film with Illona Massey, who later said she did not like the film or remember anything about the production.

From contemporary reviews, an anonymous reviewer in Harrison's Reports described the film as "fairly entertaining" and noted the special effects were handled well but were nothing new. Kate Cameron of The New York Daily News found the film "amusing and exciting" with the actors performing "their supporting roles capably, although none of them tries to be convincing".

Some sources commented on the politics and representation of the axis powers in the film, with an anonymous reviewer in Newsweek declared that Universal had "assembled a cast that is much too good for the nonsense on the agenda" and The Film Daily announcing that "this is the ordinary peace-time meller translated into wartime pattern [...] The nazis are made to look pretty stupid and beset with official rivalry, while the Japs appear like slippery villains of the old serial days". A reviewer from The Hollywood Reporter spoke on this, stating: "Possibly, the smartest thing about the picture is its consistent refusal to underrate the intelligence of the Gestapo and Rising Sun operatives. They are as hep to the plot as you are, this being one of the first times such [villains] have been shown as capable of adding two and two to reach a correct answer".

From retrospective reviews, the authors of Universal Horrors stated that the film was a "cut above average" for a war time genre film as well as "maddeningly uneven", and that "far and away the best thing about Invisible Agent is the casting of Sir Cedric Hardwicke and Peter Lorre as the representatives of the Axis", declaring them "casebook example of how a bit of stylish acting can transcend routinely written roles". Bruce Eder writing for AllMovie described the film as "oddly schizophrenic", with its opening sequence resembling a Fritz Lang film is interlaced with scenes that had the "tone and mood of a very flaccid comedy spiced up with some amazing special effects". Eder also praised Lorre while declaring the rest of the film as having "all manner of ludicrous dialogue and a few eye-popping special effects to carry the ridiculous plot and some occasionally wretched acting".

Ilona Massey later reflected in the film in a 1971 interview, where she was described as having "disliked the [film] so much that she can scarcely remember what it was about" and "can't remember what her role in this film was".
