= On the Isle of Samoa =

1950 film by William A. Berke

- Directed by: William Berke
- Screenplay by: Brenda Weisberg; Harold Greene
- Story by: Joseph Santley
- Produced by: Wallace MacDonald
- Starring: Jon Hall
- Cinematography: William Bradford
- Edited by: Aaron Stell
- Production company: Columbia Pictures
- Distributed by: Columbia Pictures
- Release date: August 3, 1950
- Running time: 65 minutes
- Country: United States
- Language: English

On the Isle of Samoa is a 1950 American South Seas adventure film directed by William Berke and starring Jon Hall in a rare villainous role.

== Cast ==
- Jon Hall as Kenneth Crandall
- Susan Cabot as Moana
- Raymond Greenleaf as Peter Appleton
- Henry Marco as Karaki
- Al Kikume as Chief Tihoti
- Rosa Turich as Waini
