= The Michigan Kid =

1947 film directed by Ray Taylor

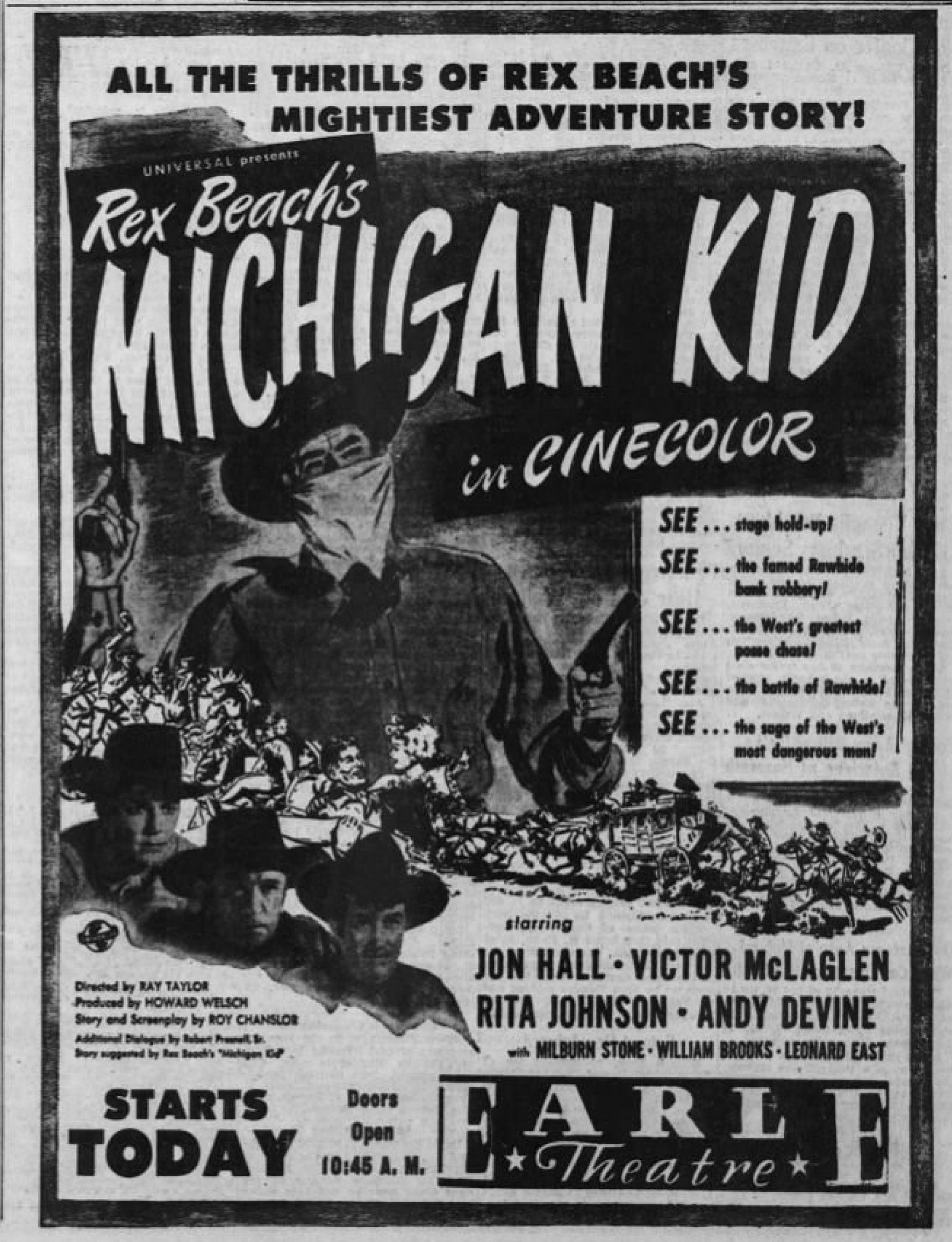
- Newspaper advertisement
- Directed by: Ray Taylor
- Written by: Robert Presnell Jr
- Screenplay by: Roy Chanslor
- Based on: Rex Beach
- Produced by: Howard Welsch
- Starring: Jon Hall; Victor McLaglen; Rita Johnson; Andy Devine
- Cinematography: Virgil Miller
- Edited by: Paul Landres
- Music by: Hans J. Salter
- Color process: Cinecolor
- Production company: Universal Pictures
- Distributed by: Universal Pictures
- Release date: 1947
- Running time: 69 minutes
- Country: United States
- Language: English

The Michigan Kid is a 1947 American Western film directed by Ray Taylor and starring Jon Hall, Victor McLaglen, Rita Johnson, and Andy Devine.

It was Hall's first film after getting out of the army and filming began 15 April 1946.

== Plot ==
A former U.S. marshal rescues an instant heiress from an outlaw's gang.

== Cast ==
- Jon Hall as Michigan Kid / Jim Rowen
- Victor McLaglen as Curley Davis
- Rita Johnson as Sue Dawson
- Andy Devine as Buster
- Joan Shawlee as Soubrette as Joan Fulton)
- William Brooks as Steve Randolph Prescott (as William Brooks)
- Stanley Andrews as Sheriff of Rawhide
- Byron Foulger as Mr. Porter
- Milburn Stone as Lanny Slade
- Leonard East as Dave Boyd
- Charles Trowbridge as John Nash - Banker
- Griff Barnett as Prentiss Dawson
- Dewey Robinson as Bartender
- Ray Teal as Sergeant
