= Oklahoma Raiders =

1944 film by Lewis D. Collins

- Theatrical release poster
- Directed by: Lewis D. Collins
- Screenplay by: Betty Burbridge (original screen play)
- Produced by: Oliver Drake
- Starring: Tex Ritter
- Cinematography: William A. Sickner
- Edited by: Norman A. Cerf
- Production company: Universal Pictures
- Distributed by: Universal Pictures
- Release date: March 17, 1944
- Running time: 57 minutes
- Country: United States
- Language: English

Oklahoma Raiders is a 1944 American Western film directed by Lewis D. Collins and starring Tex Ritter.

== Plot ==
Cowboys go to buy fresh horses for the cavalry and end up taking on two badguys and a female vigilante.

== Cast ==
- Tex Ritter as Steve Nolan
- Fuzzy Knight as Banjo Bonner
- Dennis Moore as Todd Wingate
- Jennifer Holt as Donna Ross aka El Vengador
- Jack Ingram as Arnold Drew
- George Eldredge as James Prescott
- John Elliott as Judge Clem Masters
- Slim Whitaker as Sheriff Seth Banning
- I. Stanford Jolley as Higgins
- Richard Alexander as Henchman Duggan (as Dick Alexander)
- Herbert Rawlinson as Colonel Rogers
- Ethan Laidlaw as Deputy Williams
- Johnny Bond as Guitar Player
- Paul Sells as Concertina Player (as Red River Valley Boys)
- Wesley Tuttle as Singer (as Red River Valley Boys)
- Jimmie Dean as Guitar Player (as Red River Valley Boys)
