= George Eldredge =

American actor (1898–1977)

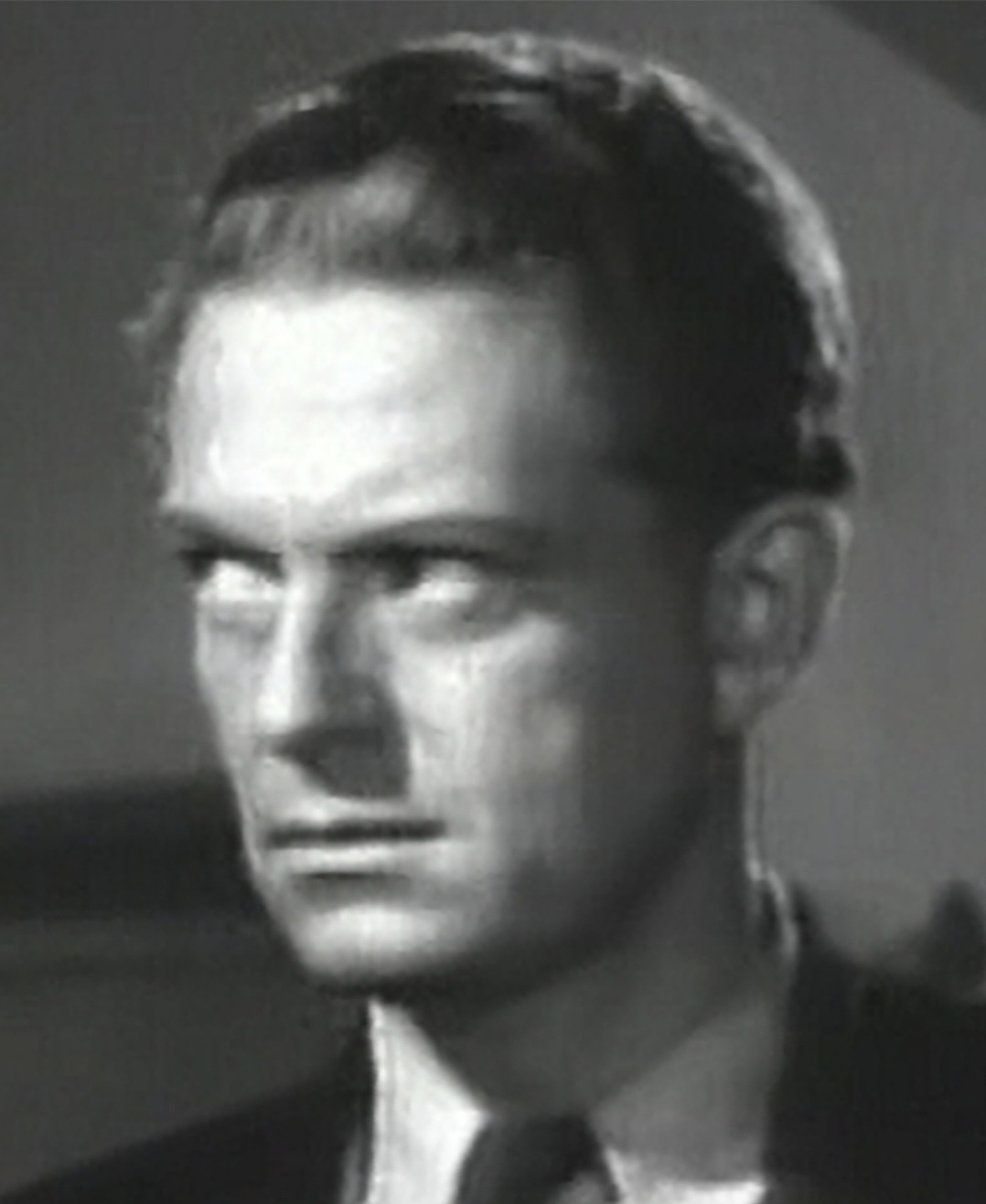
- Eldredge in Bowery at Midnight (1942)
- Born: George Edwin Eldredge; September 10, 1898; San Francisco, California, U.S.
- Died: March 12, 1977 (aged 78); Los Angeles, California, U.S.
- Other names: Geo. Eldredge; George Eldridge
- Occupation: Actor
- Years active: 1936–1963
- Relatives: John Eldredge (brother)

George Edwin Eldredge (September 10, 1898 – March 12, 1977) was an American actor who appeared in over 180 movies during a career that stretched from the 1930s to the early 1960s. He also had a prolific television career during the 1950s. He was the older brother of actor John Dornin Eldredge.

== Biography ==
=== Early life ===
Eldredge was born George Edwin Eldredge in San Francisco, California. His father, Rev. George Granville Eldredge, was a Presbyterian minister in San Francisco. His mother was Julia Dornin Eldredge, the daughter of George D. Dornin, a California legislator and noted Daguerrotypist, and Sarah Baldwin Dornin. In 1922, he married Phyllis Harms, and they had two children, George Granville Eldredge and Helene Eldredge.

He was a photographer for the Berkeley, California Police Department, and prior to embarking on a film career, auditioned for and performed with the San Francisco Opera Company for two seasons in various supporting roles as a baritone.

=== Film career ===
Between 1936 and 1963 Eldredge appeared in 182 films beginning with his role as an English spy in Till We Meet Again. He was typically cast as authority figures such as army generals (The Rookie), doctors (Riders to the Stars), and innumerable police officers. However Eldredge sometimes was cast against type, as in his role as the traitorous Dr. Tobor in the B movie, Captain Video: Master of the Stratosphere.

Arguably his best known film role came in the 1945 cult exploitation film Mom and Dad where Eldredge portrayed Dan Blake, the father of a teenage girl who accidentally becomes pregnant because her parents withhold knowledge about sex from her. Although the morals of the time prevented most advertising for this film, it still became the number two moneymaker for 1945.

Throughout the 1950s Eldredge also had a prolific television career, appearing on such programs as Peter Gunn, Bat Masterson, The Adventures of Superman, Alfred Hitchcock Presents, and Perry Mason. He had a recurring role as Dr. Spaulding in all three Spin and Marty series, featured on Disney's Mickey Mouse Club and was seen repeatedly on Bat Masterson.

Eldredge also appeared as a Chamberlain in Demetrius and the Gladiators, which was a sequel to 20th Century Fox's biblical epic, The Robe.

Although he worked steadily for several decades George Eldredge never became a major star. Many of his roles were small and his name was often unlisted in the credits of the films he played in. His final role was an uncredited part in the 1963 film Johnny Cool.

== Selected filmography ==
- Till We Meet Again (1936) – English Officer Spy (uncredited)
- Special Agent K-7 (1936) – Ames – Prosecuting Attorney
- Paroled from the Big House (1938) – 'Red' Herron
- Hawk of the Wilderness (1938, Serial) – Allan Kendall
- Exile Express (1939) – Federal Man (uncredited)
- The Star Maker (1939) – Reporter
- Northwest Passage (1940) – McMullen (uncredited)
- Junior G-Men (1940, Serial) – Draftsman Lynch [Chs. 5–6] (uncredited)
- Take Me Back to Oklahoma (1940) – Sheriff
- Buzzy Rides the Range (1940) – Fred Ames
- Roaring Frontiers (1941) – Sheriff (uncredited)
- Spooks Run Wild (1941) – Policeman (uncredited)
- They Died with Their Boots On (1941) – Captain Riley (uncredited)
- Pacific Blackout (1941) – Police Dispatcher (uncredited)
- The Ghost of Frankenstein (1942) – Constable (uncredited)
- Gang Busters (1942, Serial) – Policeman at Bank [Ch. 7] (uncredited)
- So's Your Aunt Emma (1942) – Jake, Mickey's Trainer (uncredited)
- The Corpse Vanishes (1942) – Mike
- Let's Get Tough! (1942) – Marine Recruiter (uncredited)
- Top Sergeant (1942) – Deputy Joey (uncredited)
- Joan of Ozark (1942) – Chandler (uncredited)
- Isle of Missing Men (1942) – Ship's Captain (uncredited)
- Bowery at Midnight (1942) – Detective Thompson (uncredited)
- Silver Queen (1942) – Hotel Guest
- The Living Ghost (1942) – Tony Weldon
- Sherlock Holmes and the Secret Weapon (1942) – Policeman Outside Durer's (uncredited)
- The Adventures of Smilin' Jack (1943, Serial) – Detective-Guard [Ch. 5] (uncredited)
- Raiders of San Joaquin (1943) – Gus Sloan
- Two Tickets to London (1943) – Fireman (uncredited)
- Frontier Law (1943) – Henchman Slinger Jones
- The Lone Star Trail (1943) – Doug Ransom
- Frontier Badmen (1943) – Cattle Buyer (uncredited)
- The Strange Death of Adolf Hitler (1943) – Gestapo Colonel (uncredited)
- Top Man (1943) – Mike (uncredited)
- There's Something About a Soldier (1943) – Transportation Manager (uncredited)
- Calling Dr. Death (1943) – District Attorney
- The Racket Man (1944) – Jerry (uncredited)
- The Impostor (1944) – (voice, uncredited)
- Arizona Whirlwind (1944) – Mr. Davis (uncredited)
- Oklahoma Raiders (1944) – James Prescott
- Hey, Rookie (1944) – Captain Mulligan (uncredited)
- Jam Session (1944) – Berkeley Bell
- Outlaw Trail (1944) – Carl Beldon
- The Girl in the Case (1944) – Henry (uncredited)
- Follow the Boys (1944) – Submarine Officer (uncredited)
- The Story of Dr. Wassell (1944) – U.S. Navy Damage Control Officer (uncredited)
- Once Upon a Time (1944) – Man (uncredited)
- Stars on Parade (1944) – Director (uncredited)
- Sonora Stagecoach (1944) – Lawyer Larry Payne
- Trigger Trail (1944) – Rance Hudson
- Return of the Ape Man (1944) – Patrolman on beat (uncredited)
- Raiders of Ghost City (1944) – Henry / Hank, Saloon Owner
- U-Boat Prisoner (1944) – George Acton, Nazi Spy (uncredited)
- Cry of the Werewolf (1944) – George Latour (uncredited)
- Trigger Law (1944) – Corey
- The Old Texas Trail (1944) – Sparks Diamond
- Song of the Range (1944) – Federal Agent CleveTrevor
- Can't Help Singing (1944) – Captain Sherwood (uncredited)
- I Was a Criminal (1945)
- Mom and Dad (1945) – Dan Blake
- Jungle Queen (1945, Serial) – Muller (uncredited)
- There Goes Kelly (1945) – John Quigley
- The Monster and the Ape (1945, Serial) – Professor Ames (uncredited)
- Counter-Attack (1945) – Russian Officer (uncredited)
- Honeymoon Ahead (1945) – Caldwell (uncredited)
- The Great John L. (1945) – Crony (uncredited)
- The Chicago Kid (1945) – Typewriter Buyer (uncredited)
- Secret Agent X-9 (1945 serial) (1945) – Bill Browder (uncredited)
- Rustlers of the Badlands (1945) – Jim Norton
- River Gang (1945) – Reporter (uncredited)
- The Royal Mounted Rides Again (1945) – Grail
- The Crimson Canary (1945) – Frank Wilson (uncredited)
- Frontier Gal (1945) – Henchman (uncredited)
- Live Wires (1946) – Policeman at Airport
- Because of Him (1946) – Reporter (uncredited)
- The Bandit of Sherwood Forest (1946) – Robin Hood's Man (uncredited)
- The Gentleman Misbehaves (1946) – Official (uncredited)
- Lost City of the Jungle (1946) – Bowen, Peace Foundation Member (uncredited)
- The Phantom Thief (1942) – Cop #2 Outside Hospital Room (uncredited)
- Passkey to Danger (1946) – Mr. Nelson (uncredited)
- Dark Alibi (1946) – Brand
- Her Adventurous Night (1946) – Police Radio Announcer (uncredited)
- In Fast Company (1946) – Officer
- Shadows Over Chinatown (1946) – Lannigan
- The Mysterious Mr. M (1946) – Thomas Elliott (uncredited)
- Below the Deadline (1946) – James S. Vail
- The Devil's Playground (1946) – U.S. Marshal
- Ginger (1946) – Health Dept. Official (uncredited)
- Dead Reckoning (1947) – Police Officer Casey (uncredited)
- The Unsuspected (1947) – Bit Part (uncredited)
- The Fabulous Texan (1947) – Tax Collector (uncredited)
- Reaching from Heaven (1948) – Mr. Gram (uncredited)
- Angels' Alley (1948) – Policeman (uncredited)
- Campus Sleuth (1948) – Officer Edwards
- King of the Gamblers (1948) – Saunders (uncredited)
- Speed to Spare (1948) – Truck Driving Instructor (uncredited)
- Jinx Money (1948) – Tax Man (uncredited)
- Shanghai Chest (1948) – Police Sergeant Pat Finley
- The Babe Ruth Story (1948) – Reporter (scenes deleted)
- For the Love of Mary (1948) – (uncredited)
- False Paradise (1948) – Radley
- Quick on the Trigger (1948) – Alfred Murdock
- Bad Boy (1949) – Gambler (uncredited)
- The Last Bandit (1949) – Bank Teller (uncredited)
- Sky Dragon (1949) – Detective Stacey (uncredited)
- Holiday Affair (1949) – Elevator Starter (uncredited)
- Undertow (1949) – Pop (uncredited)
- Bodyhold (1949) – Stadium Security Guard Morgan (uncredited)
- Samson and Delilah (1949) – Lord (uncredited)
- Shadow on the Wall (1950) – Prosecuting Attorney (uncredited)
- Louisa (1950) – Policeman (uncredited)
- Federal Man (1950) – Wade Brandon
- Hi-Jacked (1950) – Digbey
- Rookie Fireman (1950) – Floyd
- Chain Gang (1950) – Guard Adams (uncredited)
- Hot Rod (1950) – Police Dispatcher (uncredited)
- Counterspy Meets Scotland Yard (1950) – Assistant (uncredited)
- Frenchie (1950) – Gorman's Friend (uncredited)
- Sierra Passage (1950) – Sheriff (uncredited)
- One Too Many (1950) – Harry
- Bowery Battalion (1951) – Major (uncredited)
- Fingerprints Don't Lie (1951) – King Sullivan
- Fury of the Congo (1951) – Barnes
- Half Angel (1951) – Court Clerk (uncredited)
- Roar of the Iron Horse – Rail-Blazer of the Apache Trail (1951) – Karl Ulrich - aka The Baron
- The Texas Rangers (1951) – Sheriff (uncredited)
- Let's Go Navy! (1951) – Officer #3 (uncredited)
- FBI Girl (1951) – Fingerprint Man (uncredited)
- Captain Video: Master of the Stratosphere (1951, Serial) – Dr. Tobor
- Phone Call from a Stranger (1952) – Doctor (uncredited)
- Meet Danny Wilson (1952) – Detective Lieutenant Kelly (uncredited)
- Jungle Jim in the Forbidden Land (1952) – Fred Lewis
- Flesh and Fury (1952) – Dr. Buell (uncredited)
- My Six Convicts (1952) – Convict #3 (uncredited)
- Loan Shark (1952) – Mr. Howell (uncredited)
- Kansas Territory (1952) – 1st Bartender (uncredited)
- Without Warning! (1952) – Sam, Detective at Murder Scene (uncredited)
- The Sniper (1952) – Man at Park Murder Scene (voice, uncredited)
- Brave Warrior (1952) – Captain Barney Demming
- California Conquest (1952) – Captain John C. Fremont (uncredited)
- Carson City (1952) – Mine Owner (uncredited)
- Just Across the Street (1952) – John Ballanger
- Ma and Pa Kettle at the Fair (1952) – Man at Accident (uncredited)
- The Duel at Silver Creek (1952) – Jim Ryan, Bartender
- Last Train from Bombay (1952) – Mr. Bern, American Consulate (uncredited)
- Monkey Business (1952) – Mr. Peabody (uncredited)
- Bonzo Goes to College (1952) – Edmund Crowe (uncredited)
- Springfield Rifle (1952) – Judge Advocate (uncredited)
- The Lawless Breed (1953) – Sheriff Charlie Webb (uncredited)
- The Mississippi Gambler (1953) – Hewitt (uncredited)
- Gunsmoke (1953) – Stagecoach Passenger (uncredited)
- It Came from Outer Space (1953) – Dr. Snell (uncredited)
- Pickup on South Street (1953) – Fenton (uncredited)
- Vice Squad (1953) – Mr. Lawson (uncredited)
- The Man from the Alamo (1953) – Sheriff Kohl (uncredited)
- Valley of the Head Hunters (1953) – Commander Kingston
- The Great Adventures of Captain Kidd (1953, Serial) – Man O' War Captain (uncredited)
- Riders to the Stars (1954) – Dr. Paul Dryden
- Loophole (1954) – Policeman (uncredited)
- Overland Pacific (1954) – Broden (uncredited)
- The Mad Magician (1954) – Theatre Manager (uncredited)
- Demetrius and the Gladiators (1954) – Chamberlain (uncredited)
- The Desperado (1954) – Mr. Bannerman (uncredited)
- Man with the Steel Whip (1954) – Clem Stokes (uncredited)
- Woman's World (1954) – Executive Reception Guest (uncredited)
- Dial Red O (1955) – Major Sutter
- An Annapolis Story (1955) – Captain Lord (uncredited)
- The Naked Street (1955) – Judge #2 (uncredited)
- Top Gun (1955) – Anders (uncredited)
- Spin and Marty: The Movie (1955) – Dr. Spaulding
- Inside Detroit (1956) – Doctor (uncredited)
- The Killer Is Loose (1956) – Police Captain (uncredited)
- Three for Jamie Dawn (1956) – Court Clerk (uncredited)
- Mister Cory (1957) – Mr. Davis – Card Player (uncredited)
- Monkey on My Back (1957) – Marine Doctor (uncredited)
- The Lineup (1958) – Dr. Turkel (uncredited)
- Life Begins at 17 (1958) – Mr. Lippincott
- Gang War (1958) – Police Sergeant Ernie Tucker
- A Nice Little Bank That Should Be Robbed (1958) – Racing Board Commissioner (uncredited)
- King of the Wild Stallions (1959) – Doc (uncredited)
- The Rookie (1959) – General Bechtel
- Vice Raid (1959) – Internal Affairs Hearing Officer (uncredited)
- A Dog's Best Friend (1959) – Dr. Lannon (uncredited)
- The 3rd Voice (1960) – Judge Kendall
- Psycho (1960) – Police Chief James Mitchell (uncredited)
- Air Patrol (1962) – Howie Franklin
- Johnny Cool (1963) – Building Superintendent (uncredited) (final film role)

== Selected Television ==
Year	Title	Role	Notes
1954	Death Valley Days	Steve Ryan	Season 2, Episode 10 "Yaller"
1955	Science Fiction Theater		Season 1, Episode 38 "Operation Flypaper"
1961	Death Valley Days	Superintendent	Season 10, Episode 1 "The Treasure of Elk Creek Canyon"
1951	The Cisco Kid		Season 2, Episode 15 "Hidden Valley"
1952	The Cisco Kid	Banker Wharton	Season 2, Episode 20 "Sleeping Gas"
1952	The Cisco Kid	Jackson	Season 2, Episode 21 "Quarter Horse"
1952	The Cisco Kid	Sheriff	Episode 'Ghost Town'
1958	Alfred Hitchcock Presents	George the Police Lieutenant	Season 3 Episode 15: "Together"
1962	Wanted Dead or Alive	Sheriff	Season 2, Episode 30 "The Inheritance"
