= Chain Gang (1950 film) =

1950 film by Lew Landers

- Titular screenshot
- Directed by: Lew Landers
- Written by: Howard J. Green
- Produced by: Sam Katzman
- Starring: Douglas Kennedy; Marjorie Lord
- Cinematography: Ira H. Morgan
- Distributed by: Columbia Pictures
- Release dates: September 1, 1950 (San Francisco); September 28, 1950 (Los Angeles/New York)
- Running time: 70 minutes
- Country: United States
- Language: English

Chain Gang is a 1950 American film noir crime film directed by Lew Landers, written by Howard J. Green and starring Douglas Kennedy as a newspaper reporter who works undercover to expose political corruption and the exploitation of chain-gang labor.

== Plot ==
After a state senator's bill to abolish chain gangs is rejected by the legislature, reporter Cliff Roberts goes undercover as a guard in a chain-gang prison. Equipped with false employment records and a tiny microfilm camera disguised as a cigarette lighter, he tells everyone, including his girlfriend Rita McKelvey, a reporter for a rival newspaper, that he is leaving for a fishing trip. Actually, his destination is Cloverdale Prison Farm, where he secures a job as a guard in order to investigate the circumstances surrounding a series of incidents that have left three inmates dead.

Roberts eventually learns that a guard captain, Duncan, is supplying cheap labor to a local business concern. The prisoners, who are ostensibly used for state business only, are being exploited by Rita's stepfather, entrepreneur John McKelvey, for his own private construction projects. Moreover, Roberts secretly witnesses and photographs prison conditions, including the capture of an escaped inmate who is punished with an overnight stay in the sweatbox. When a convict named Snead is accused of a minor offense, Captain Duncan orders Roberts to flog Snead at the whipping post. Later that evening, however, Roberts smuggles in food for Snead. He apologizes for the whipping and, in doing so, gains Snead's trust.

Roberts' secret photographs are published in the newspaper, angering McKelvey. But when an inmate sees Roberts' photograph in McKelvey's house, the reporter's cover is blown. Snead escapes and Roberts joins him. They outrun the guards and their bloodhounds across wilderness, but Roberts is shot and left for dead by Captain Duncan, who later pins the blame on Snead. The wounded Roberts conceals himself, eventually gaining freedom and reuniting with Rita. Unfortunately, Snead is killed while still on the run, but McKelvey is charged with exploitation of convict labor for personal gain.

== Cast ==
- Douglas Kennedy as Cliff Roberts
- Marjorie Lord as Rita McKelvey
- Emory Parnell as Capt. Duncan
- William Phillips as Roy Snead
- Thurston Hall as John McKelvey
- Harry Cheshire as Henry 'Pop' O'Donnell
- Fred Aldrich as Convict
- Stanley Blystone as Convict on Chain Gang
- Paul E. Burns as Dr. Evans
- Benny Burt as Convict in Bunk
- Jack Chefe as Convict
- James Conaty as Pop's Influential Friend
- George Eldredge as Guard Adams
- William Fawcett as Zeke
- Eddie Foster as Convict Operating Crane
- John Hart as Chain Gang Member
- Don C. Harvey as Guard Langley
- Charles Horvath as Convict in Skirmish
- Billy Lechner as Eddie Jones
- Herbert Rawlinson as Senator Harden
- George Robotham as Guard Reagan
- John Rogers as Joe – Lunch Counterman
- Larry Steers as Senate Committee Hearing Attendee
- Bert L. Stevens as Newspaper Office Worker
- Brick Sullivan as Guard
- William Tannen as Harry Cleaver
- Dorothy Vaughan as Mrs. Briggs
- Rusty Wescoatt as Guard Yates
- Frank Wilcox as Lloyd Killgallen

== Production ==
Lew Landers was announced as the film's director in early May 1950.

== Reception ==
The film was first screened in San Francisco on September 1, 1950, as a second feature to The Desert Hawk.

In a contemporary review for the New York Daily News, critic Dorothy Masters wrote: "There seems to be an unnecessary emphasis on each of the melodramatic maneuvers, but it's fairly safe to predict that Douglas Kennedy, who plays the reporter, will survive the opus and go on to better things."

== Home video ==
The film was issued on DVD in 2012 as part of the Sony Choice Collection.
