= Adele Jergens =

American actress (1917–2002)

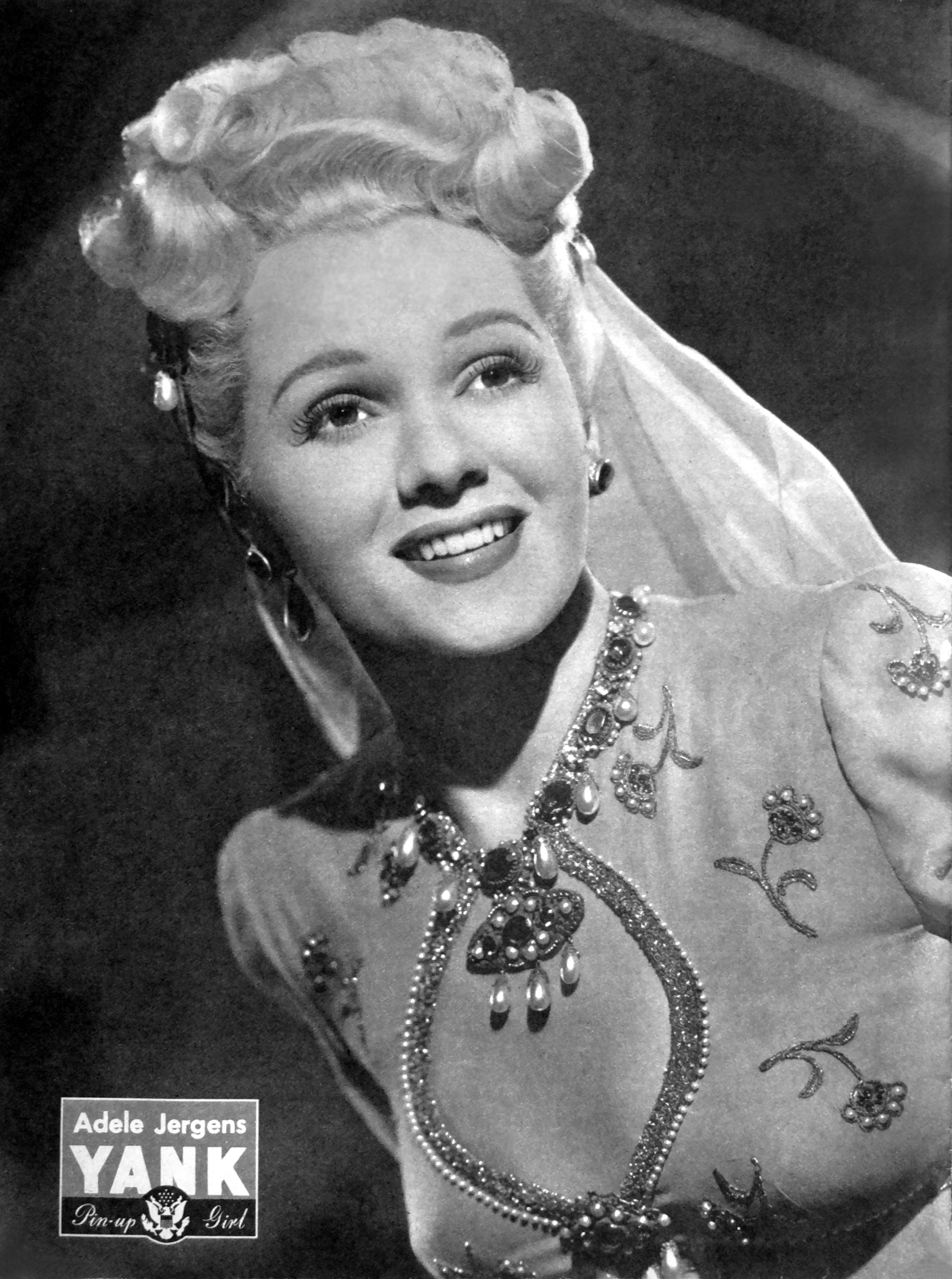
- Jergens pin-up, July 1945
- Born: Adele Louisa Jurgens (or Jurgenson); November 26, 1917; Brooklyn, New York. U.S.
- Died: November 22, 2002 (aged 84); Camarillo, California, U.S.
- Resting place: Oakwood Memorial Park Cemetery; Pioneer Section, Lot 553, Grave 1
- Years active: 1935–1956
- Spouse: Glenn Langan (m. 1949; died 1991)
- Children: 1

Adele Jergens (November 26, 1917 – November 22, 2002) was an American actress.

== Early life ==
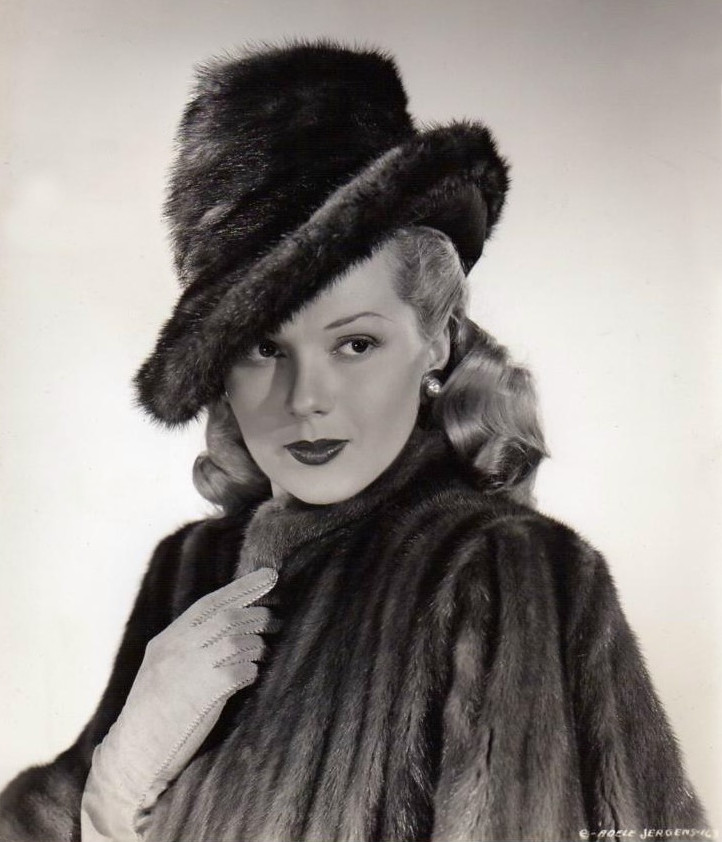
Jergens in 1945

Adele Jergens was born in Brooklyn, New York, on November 26, 1917. She took ballet instruction in her early years but later changed to dancing in burlesque, which led to her teachers and classmates calling her "the girl with the million-dollar legs". She attended South Side High School in Rockville Centre, New York.

== Career ==
Jergens danced in the chorus at the Brooklyn Fox Theatre and the 1936 Ziegfeld Follies, and she became a model for the John Robert Powers agency in 1938.

Jergens rose to prominence in the late 1930s when she was named "Miss World's Fairest" at the 1939 New York World's Fair. In 1940, she appeared at Columbia University's Senior Fall Formal, where she was crowned Queen of the Formal and danced with the undergraduates. In the early 1940s, she briefly worked as a Rockette and was named the number-one showgirl in New York City.

After a few years' work as a model and chorus girl, including being an understudy to Gypsy Rose Lee in the Broadway show Star and Garter in 1942, Jergens landed a movie contract with Columbia Pictures in 1944, and dyed her brown hair blonde.

At the beginning of her career, she was usually cast as a floozy or burlesque dancer, such as in Down to Earth starring Rita Hayworth (1947), The Dark Past starring William Holden (1948), and Armored Car Robbery (1950).

She played Marilyn Monroe's mother in Ladies of the Chorus (1948) despite being only nine years older than Monroe. She played a criminal's girl in Try and Get Me (1950), and appeared in the movie Abbott and Costello Meet the Invisible Man (1951).

She had a part in The Cobweb (1955), directed by Vincente Minnelli and starring Richard Widmark and Lauren Bacall. She worked in the 1950s radio show Stand By for Crime as Glamourpuss Carol Curtis alongside her real-life husband Glenn Langan as Chuck Morgan.

== Personal life ==
In 1949, while filming Treasure of Monte Cristo, a film noir set in San Francisco, she met and married co-star Glenn Langan. They remained married until his death from lymphoma on January 26, 1991, at age 73.

They had one child, a son, Tracy Langan, who eventually worked in Hollywood as a film technician. He died of a brain tumor in 2001.

== Death ==
Jergens died from pneumonia on November 22, 2002, in her home in Camarillo, California, aged 84.

She was buried beside her husband and son at Oakwood Memorial Park Cemetery in Chatsworth, California.

== Selected filmography ==
- Hello Frisco, Hello (1943) – Chorine (uncredited)
- Sweet Rosie O'Grady (1943) – Diner at Delmonico's / Chorus Girl (uncredited)
- Jane Eyre (1943) – Woman at Party (uncredited)
- The Gang's All Here (1943) – Chorus Girl (uncredited)
- Pin Up Girl (1944) – Canteen Worker (uncredited)
- Black Arrow (1944) – Mary Brent
- Dancing in Manhattan (1944) – Darnelle (uncredited)
- Together Again (1944) – Gilda LaVerne (uncredited)
- Tonight and Every Night (1945) – Showgirl (uncredited)
- A Thousand and One Nights (1945) – Princess Armina
- State Fair (1945) – Girl on Rollercoaster (uncredited)
- Fallen Angel (1945) – Woman at Madley's Show (uncredited)
- She Wouldn't Say Yes (1945) – Allura
- The Corpse Came C.O.D. (1947) – Mona Harrison
- Down to Earth (1947) – Georgia Evans
- When a Girl's Beautiful (1947) – Adele Jordan
- Blondie's Anniversary (1947) – Gloria Stafford
- The Prince of Thieves (1948) – Lady Christabel
- I Love Trouble (1948) – Boots Nestor
- The Woman from Tangier (1948) – Nylon
- The Fuller Brush Man (1948) – Miss Sharmley
- The Dark Past (1948) – Laura Stevens
- Ladies of the Chorus (1948) – Mae Martin
- Slightly French (1949) – Yvonne La Tour
- Law of the Barbary Coast (1949) – Lita
- The Crime Doctor's Diary (1949) – Inez Gray
- Make Believe Ballroom (1949) – Adele Jergens
- The Mutineers (1949) – Norma Harrison
- Treasure of Monte Cristo (1949) – Jean Turner
- The Traveling Saleswoman (1950) – Lilly
- Radar Secret Service (1950) – Lila
- Blonde Dynamite (1950) – Joan Marshall
- Side Street (1950) – Lucille 'Lucky' Colner
- Everybody's Dancin' (1950) – Adele Jergens
- Beware of Blondie (1950) – Toby Clifton
- Armored Car Robbery (1950) – Yvonne LeDoux
- Edge of Doom (1950) – Irene
- Blues Busters (1950) – Lola Stanton
- The Sound of Fury (1950) – Velma
- Sugarfoot (1951) – Reva Cairn
- Abbott and Costello Meet the Invisible Man (1951) – Boots Marsden
- Show Boat (1951) – Cameo McQueen (uncredited)
- Aaron Slick from Punkin Crick (1952) – Gladys
- Somebody Loves Me (1952) – Nola Beach
- Overland Pacific (1954) – Jessie Loraine
- Fireman Save My Child (1954) – Harry's Wife
- The Miami Story (1954) – Gwen Abbott
- The Big Chase (1954) – Doris Grayson
- Strange Lady in Town (1955) – Bella Brown
- Outlaw Treasure (1955) – Rita Starr
- The Cobweb (1955) – Miss Cobb
- The Lonesome Trail (1955) – Mae
- Day the World Ended (1955) – Ruby
- Girls in Prison (1956) – Jenny
- Fighting Trouble (1956) – Mae Randle
- Runaway Daughters (1956) – Dixie Jackson
