= Lewis Russell =

American actor (1889–1961)

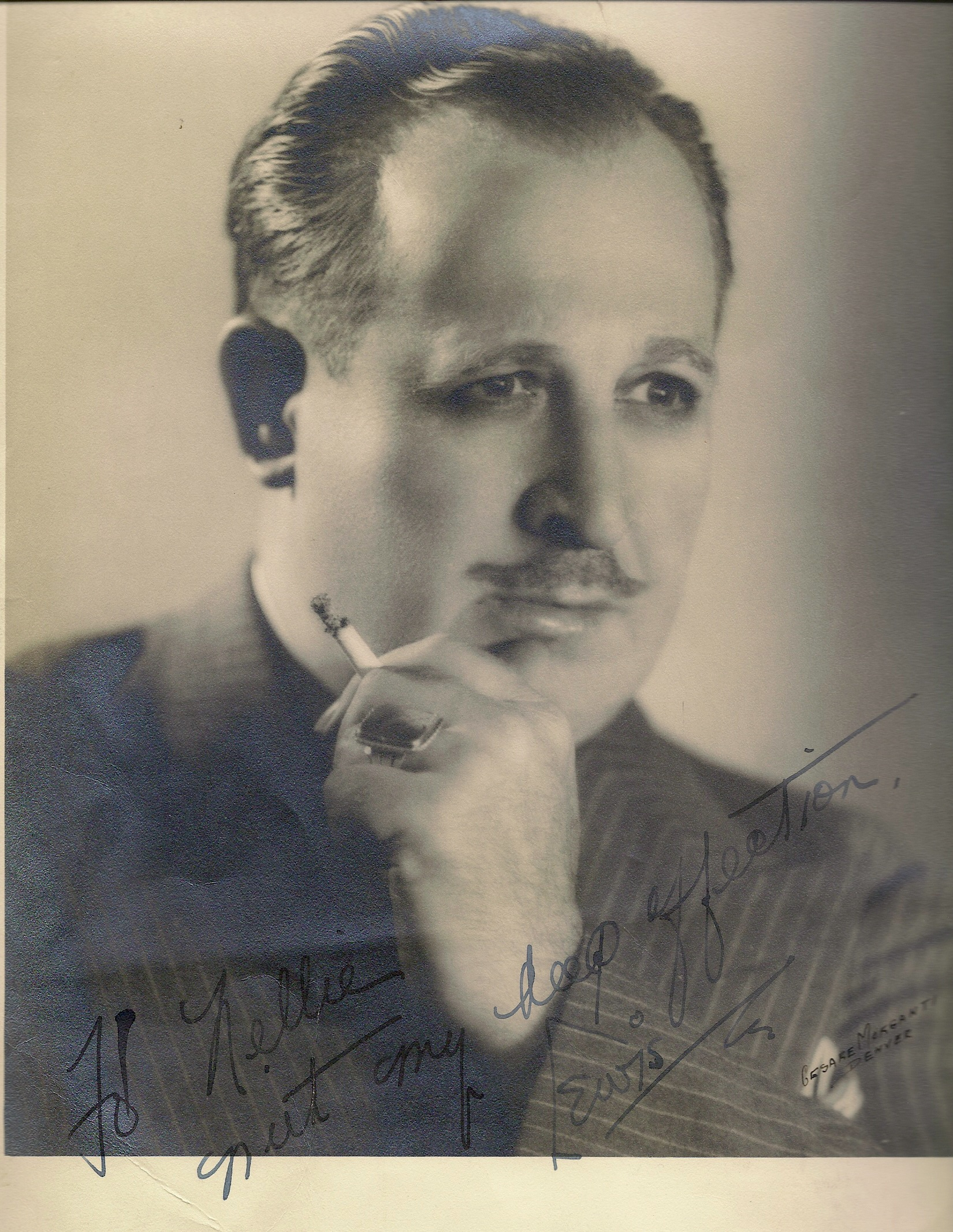
- Russel in the 1930s
- Born: George Lewis Lord; September 10, 1889; Farmington, Illinois, U.S.
- Died: November 12, 1961 (aged 72); Reseda, California, U.S.
- Other names: Lewis Lord Russell; Lewis L. Russell
- Occupation: Actor
- Years active: 1935–1956

Lewis Lord Russell (born George Lewis Lord, September 10, 1889 – November 12, 1961) was an American actor of the 1930s, 1940s and 1950s who starred in a number of vaudeville shows, Broadway dramas and Hollywood films, including the Academy Award winning The Lost Weekend (1945) and the Marx Brothers film, A Night in Casablanca (1946).

== Early life and work ==
Russell was born in Farmington, Illinois to British immigrants Samuel and Martha Jane (Wood) Lord, he was the only child of nine born in the United States and, curiously, the only one who developed an English accent. His father was an Illinois coal miner. After running away from home as a teenager, he began his life in the restaurant business, becoming an avid cook and eventually owning two restaurants. He also designed rugs and tapestries and worked as a tailor in New York, creating elaborate costumes for the stage.

== Career ==
As a vaudeville actor, Russell toured the U.S. and played at the Palace Theater in Peoria, Illinois, at a time when the phrase "Will it play in Peoria?" was well-known to vaudevillians who tested out their routines and sketches in front of the demanding and often difficult-to-please Peoria crowds.

Billing himself as an actor from London, Russell broke into the Broadway scene in the mid 1930s and starred as "The Squire" in the Broadway revival production of Emlyn Williams's The Corn is Green (1943) with leading lady Ethel Barrymore at the Martin Beck Theatre in New York. He also toured with actress Glenda Farrell for several years in the New Rochelle Circuit. According to legend, he declined the starring role in The Man who Came to Dinner (1942) with Bette Davis, and created the role of the janitor in My Sister Eileen (1942/1955). He played Pancho Villa and had several starring roles in silent pictures, acting at least once opposite Pola Negri. He also played Jane Wyman’s concerned father, Charles St. James, in The Lost Weekend, Ray Milland’s most popular film.

The playbill for the opening night of Bright Rebel (1938), a drama about the British Romantic-Era poet Lord Byron, features the following biographical note, which not only confirms Russell's adoption of an English identity but also suggests that he starred in many more plays than currently on record: "LEWIS L. RUSSELL (Lord Melbourne) is both an Englishman and an actor by birth. He was born in Leeds, England, shortly after his mother, a well-known English actress, gave one of those 'the show must go on' performances. With as dramatic a beginning as that he could hardly help getting back on the stage and there has been for some fifty years. A few scattered plays among the innumerable he has appeared in are 'The Rosary,' 'Lombardy, Ltd.,' 'The Bad Man,' 'Within the Law,' 'Madame X,' 'Accent on Youth,' and 'Yes My Darling Daughter.'"

== Later life ==
He designed his own home in Pasadena, California, where he kept house, Ernest Hemingway-style, with his two-dozen cats. He died in Reseda, California at the age of 72. (Another source says that he was 76 years old when he died.)

== Roles ==
=== Broadway ===
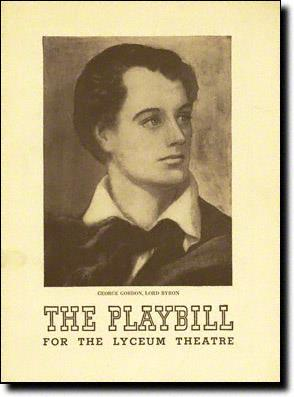
Playbill for "Bright Rebel" at the Lyceum Theatre, Broadway, December 1938, featuring an image of Lord Byron

- Dead End (October 28, 1935 – June 12, 1937) as Medical Examiner
- London Assurance (February 18, 1937 – February 1937) as Max Harkaway
- Abe Lincoln in Illinois (October 15, 1938 – December 1939) as Judge Bowling Green
- Bright Rebel (December 27, 1938 – January 1939) as Lord Melbourne
- Return Engagement (November 1, 1940 – November 7, 1940) as Baldy Bemis
- Cuckoos on the Hearth (September 16, 1941 – January 3, 1942) as Zadoc Grimes
- The Corn Is Green (May 3, 1943 – June 19, 1943) as The Squire

=== Films ===
- The Affairs of Susan (1945) as Mr. Cusp
- Molly and Me (1945) as Sir Arthur Burroughs
- You Came Along (1945) as Chairman
- The Lost Weekend (1945) as Charles St. James
- Hold That Blonde! (1945) as Henry Carteret
- She Wouldn't Say Yes (1945) as Colonel Brady
- One Way to Love (1946) as Roger Winthrop
- A Night in Casablanca (1946, a Marx Bros. film) as Governor Galoux
- She Wrote the Book (1946) as George Dixon
- If I'm Lucky (1946) as P.H. Gillingwater (uncredited)
- Monsieur Beaucaire (1946) as Chief Justice (uncredited)
- Cross My Heart (1946) as Judge
- Ladies Man (1947) as David Harmon
- Jewels of Brandenburg (1947) as Roger Hamilton
- The Trouble with Women (1947) as Dr. Wilmer Dawson
- I Wonder Who's Kissing Her Now (1947) as T.J. Milford (uncredited)
- The Prince of Thieves (1948) as Sir Fitz-Alwin (uncredited)
- My Dog Rusty (1948) as Mayor Fulderwilder
- Kiss the Blood Off My Hands (1948) as Tom Widgery
- When the Redskins Rode (1951) as Gov. Dinwiddie
- The Underworld Story (1950) as Calvin
- Corky of Gasoline Alley (1951) as Hull (uncredited)
- Les Misérables (1952) as Waiter (uncredited)
- Against All Flags (1952) as Oxford (uncredited)
- Sangaree (1953) as Capt. Bronson
- The King's Thief (1955) as Gentleman (uncredited)
- The Naked Hills (1956) as Baxter (uncredited) (final film role)

=== Television ===
- Public Prosecutor, episode "The Case of the Missing Hour" (1947) as Jerome O. Kendrick
- The Life of Riley, "Egbert's Chemistry Set" (1949) as Doctor
- China Smith, "Shanghai Clipper" (1952) as Lord Ratcliffe
- Front Page Detective, "Seven Seas to Danger" (1952) as Dr. Oscar Grandell
- Adventures of Superman, "Five Minutes to Doom" (1953) as W. T. Wayne
- I Married Joan, "Brad's Moustache" (1953) as a Member of the Nominating Committee
