= Jon Hall (actor) =

American actor (1915–1979)

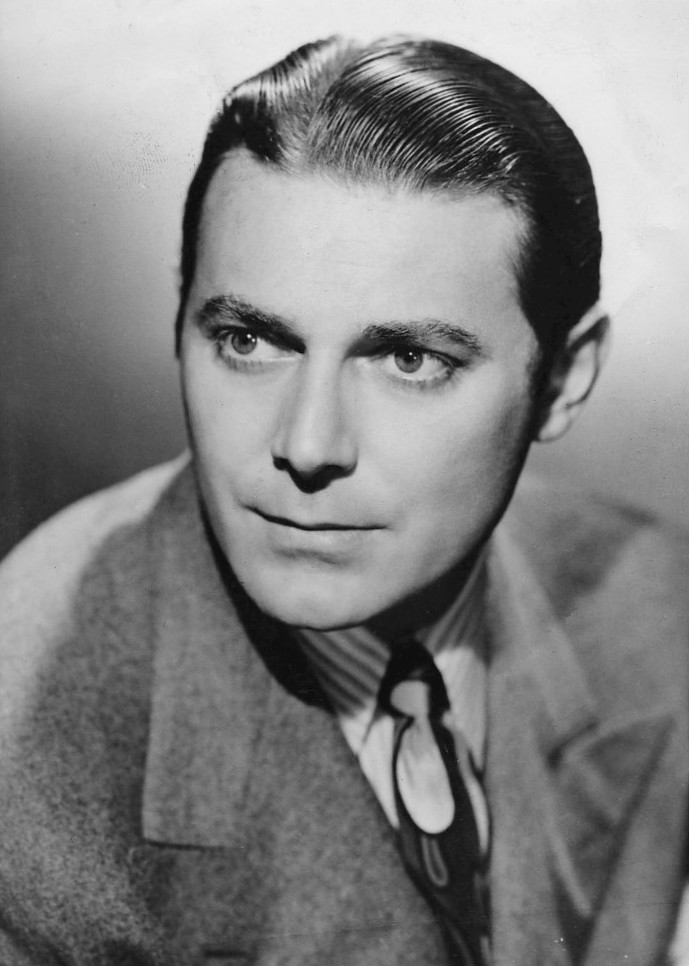
- Hall in 1956
- Born: Charles Felix Locher; February 23, 1915; Fresno, California, U.S.
- Died: December 13, 1979 (aged 64); Los Angeles, California, U.S.
- Resting place: Forest Lawn, Hollywood Hills Cemetery
- Occupation: Actor
- Years active: 1935–1965
- Spouse(s): Frances Langford (m. 1934; div. 1955) Raquel Torres (m. 1959; div. 19??) (m. 19??; div. 19??)

Jon Hall (born Charles Felix Locher, February 23, 1915 – December 13, 1979) was an American film actor known for playing a variety of adventurous roles, as in 1937's The Hurricane, and later when contracted to Universal Pictures, including Invisible Agent, The Invisible Man's Revenge, and six films with Maria Montez. He was also the creator and star of the Ramar of the Jungle television series that ran from 1952 to 1954. Hall directed and starred in two 1960s science fiction films in his later years, The Beach Girls and the Monster (1965) and The Navy vs. the Night Monsters (1966).

Television critic Stephen Vagg described Hall as:

Handsome, well-built, slightly awkward and not terribly charismatic, he nonetheless managed to persevere in leading roles for two decades, half that time in “A” pictures, which isn’t too shabby by any measure, especially for someone who couldn’t really act. He had the lead role in a bona fide classic from a master director, appeared in a string of beloved cult pictures (covering camp, horror and “I can’t believe they made that”), formed one-third of a legendary on-screen team, had an exotic love life and tragic death, got involved in a Hollywood scandal and was a genuine renaissance man IRL, reinventing himself several times.

== Early life and career ==
Born in Fresno, California, and raised in Tahiti by his father, the Swiss-born actor Felix Maurice Locher, Hall was a nephew of writer James Norman Hall, co-author (with Charles Nordhoff) of the novel Mutiny on the Bounty (1932).

Hall originally intended to go into the diplomatic service and was educated in England and Switzerland. Gouvernor Morris, a friend from Tahiti, suggested that Hall try acting.

=== Charles Locher ===
Hall began his career using the name "Charles Locher". His first performance was in a local theatre production of M'Lord the Duke, replacing Robert Taylor; Taylor had just signed with MGM.

His appearance on stage in Murder on a Mountain at the Bliss Hayden Little Theatre in Beverly Hills earned him a contract at Warner Bros. He followed it with What? No Yacht? at the Bliss Hayden. Nothing happened with the Warners/ contract: his first film was Women Must Dress (1935) at Monogram Pictures.

In April 1935, Hall signed with 20th Century Fox for a role in Charlie Chan Goes To Egypt. He did not appear in that movie, but he did have an uncredited bit in Here's to Romance and he played the romantic male lead in Charlie Chan in Shanghai (1935). After that, the studio released him from his contract.

Hall recalled that "for the next three years I took whatever jobs in pictures they'd give me." He had supporting roles in Westerns: The Mysterious Avenger (1936) at Columbia; Winds of the Wasteland (1936), with John Wayne at Republic Pictures, and in the serial The Clutching Hand (1936). Hall also had the lead in a low-budget adventure movie, The Lion Man (1936), based on a novel by Edgar Rice Burroughs. He was rejected for the lead of the Flash Gordon serial.

=== Lloyd Crane ===
Hall changed his screen name to "Lloyd Crane" and in 1936 signed a contract with Major Pictures, a company run by producer Emmanuel Cohen, who distributed through Paramount. Other actors who had deals with Cohen included Bing Crosby, Mae West, and Gary Cooper. He made two pictures for Cohen, Mind Your Own Business (1936) and The Girl from Scotland Yard (1937). Then Cohen dropped him.

== Stardom ==
=== The Hurricane ===
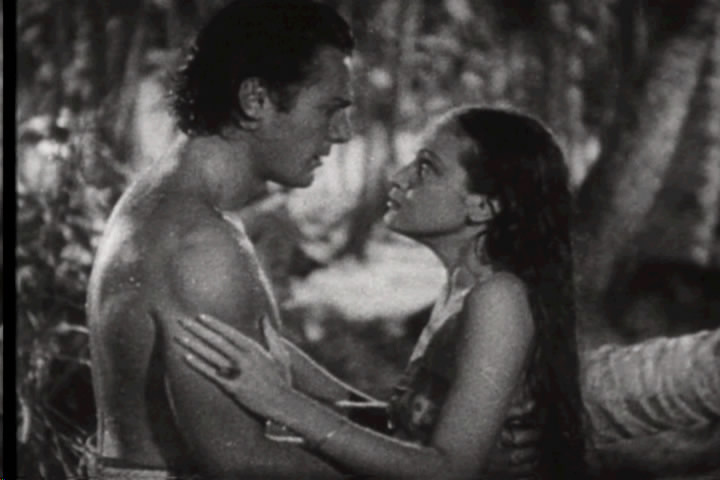
Hall and Dorothy Lamour in The Hurricane

Samuel Goldwyn was preparing a big budget spectacular, The Hurricane (1937), based on a novel by Nordhoff and Hall and directed by John Ford. They were having trouble finding someone to play the native whose wrongful imprisonment is the focus of the drama. Ford introduced Hall to Goldwyn, who signed Hall to a long-term contract and cast him as Terangi. Hurricane became a big success.

Goldwyn paid Hall $150 a week, which eventually rose to $200 a week.

Hall spent the next two and a half years idle under his contract while Goldwyn—who made only a few movies each year—contemplated what to do with him. There was some talk of a sequel to The Hurricane; of playing the lead in Golden Boy; of Black Gold, a film about firefighters in Oklahoma; of The Fleet's In; of Tahiti, based on a book by Somerset Maugham. Alexander Korda wanted Hall for The Thief of Bagdad. These films were either not made at all or were made without Hall. Discussing the hiatus, Hall said "At first it's alright because you tell [people]... what you believe to be true, that the studio is trying to find you a right script. But after a year, after a year and a half, after two years, you start to go nuts. You find yourself ducking across the street to avoid people who will ask you what you are doing."

=== Edward Small ===
After two and a half years of inactivity, Hall made three films in quick succession: Sailor's Lady (1940), a comedy with Nancy Kelly that was developed by Goldwyn and sold to 20th Century Fox; South of Pago Pago (1940), a South Seas adventure with Frances Farmer, for producer Edward Small; and Kit Carson (1940), in the title role, again for Edward Small.

Dorothy Lamour had gone to Paramount, and she was reunited with Hall in the South Seas tale, Aloma of the South Seas (1941). Hall stayed in that genre for The Tuttles of Tahiti (1942) with Charles Laughton at RKO, from a novel by Nordhoff and Hall.

=== Universal and Maria Montez ===
Goldwyn agreed to share Hall's contract with Universal Pictures, which put the actor in a supporting role in Eagle Squadron (1942), produced by Walter Wanger and directed by Arthur Lubin. It was a huge hit. They gave him the lead in Invisible Agent (1942), the fourth in their "Invisible Man" series.

Wanger called upon Hall for another movie at Universal, a big budget "exotic" spectacular co-starring Maria Montez and Sabu, Arabian Nights (1942). It was Universal's first color film in years and was a massive hit.

Universal promptly reunited Montez, Hall and Sabu in two more films: White Savage (1943), directed by Lubin, and Cobra Woman (1944), directed by Robert Siodmak. Lubin called Hall "not a very good actor. He was a charming boy."

Paramount borrowed Hall for the musical Lady in the Dark (1944), in which he played the role originated on Broadway by Victor Mature.

Back at Universal Hall returned to the Invisible Man series with The Invisible Man's Revenge (1944), making him the only actor to have portrayed an Invisible Man more than once in the original Universal series.

Hall was meant to be reunited with Montez and Sabu for three more technicolor films. However Sabu was drafted into the army and was replaced by Turhan Bey for Ali Baba and the Forty Thieves (1944), directed by Lubin. Bey was going to reteam with Hall and Montez in Gypsy Wildcat (1944), but he was needed for another film, and was replaced by Peter Coe. Hall appeared in a comedy, San Diego, I Love You (1945), and then was reunited with Montez and Bey in Sudan (1945) – although this was the one Hall-Montez film where she wound up with someone else at the end: Bey.

Hall appeared in a comedy Men in Her Diary (1945), filmed in early 1945 and then went into the army. He was out of the Army by April 1946 and made a pair of Westerns, The Michigan Kid (1947) and The Vigilantes Return (1947). After this, Hall made no further films for Universal, although he was still under contract to Goldwyn. In August 1946, he cancelled his contracts with Goldwyn and Universal and signed a one-picture deal with Sam Katzman.

== Later career ==
=== Sam Katzman ===
Hall went on to make a number of films for producer Sam Katzman, who had a set-up at Columbia Pictures. Their association began with Last of the Redmen (1947), an adaptation of Last of the Mohicans, for which he had been borrowed from Sam Goldwyn. He followed it with The Prince of Thieves (1948), playing Robin Hood, and The Mutineers (1949).

Hall was in three films for director William Berke; Zamba (1949), an adventure tale; Deputy Marshall (1949), a Western, and On the Isle of Samoa (1950), a South Seas tale.

Hall was meant to appear in Last of the Buccaneers for Katzman, but Paul Henreid played the role. In June 1950, he signed a new three-picture contract with Katzman and Hall's wife, Frances Langford, signed a two-picture contract. They both starred in Hurricane Island (1951), and Katzman scheduled Thief of Damascus for the two of them. Henreid wound up starring in that instead; Hall made two Westerns, When the Redskins Rode (1951), and Brave Warrior (1952). He also made China Corsair (1951) for Columbia.

Hall returned to Katzman for Last Train from Bombay (1952).

=== Television ===
Jon Hall is perhaps best remembered by later audiences as the star of the television series Ramar of the Jungle, which ran from 1952 to 1954.

He made a pilot for an unsold series, Knight of the South Seas for his own company, Lovina Productions. It was not picked up for series but the pilot was edited into a film, Hell Ship Mutiny (1957).

He returned to feature films with Forbidden Island (1959), made at Columbia by Charles B. Griffith. He said he wished to follow it with three more movies, two set in the Orient and one a Western. However the film was not successful, and it was a number of years before Hall appeared in another movie.

Hall made his final two television appearances on Perry Mason; in 1963, he played Max Randall in "The Case of the Festive Felon" and in 1965 he played Lt. Kia in "The Case of the Feather Cloak." He directed and starred in the 1965 cult horror film The Beach Girls and the Monster.

== Non-acting career ==
Hall was an inventor and highly skilled aviator. He held patents for an underwater camera, optivision lenses, and the design of the hulls of PT boats for the US Navy.

Hall shot some additional footage for The Navy vs. the Night Monsters (1966).

With his father, he developed the Locher-Hall Telecurve map, a revolutionary cartographic device.

During the 1970s Hall ran a camera lens firm, Optivision Co. of Santa Monica.

== Personal life ==
Hall was married to singer Frances Langford from 1934 until 1955, and also later twice married and divorced actress Raquel Torres (m 1959).

In 1944, he took part in "the battle of the balcony," a fight between Hall and big band leader Tommy Dorsey.

=== Death ===
Hall was diagnosed with incurable bladder cancer, which caused him extreme pain. He died by suicide on December 13, 1979, and was buried at the Forest Lawn, Hollywood Hills Cemetery in Los Angeles.

=== Hollywood Walk of Fame ===
Hall has two stars on the Hollywood Walk of Fame, for Motion Pictures at 1724 Vine Street and for television at 6933 Hollywood Boulevard.

== Filmography ==
Features:

- Women Must Dress (1935) – Janet's Other Friend
- Here's to Romance (1935) – Chauffeur (uncredited)
- Charlie Chan in Shanghai (1935) – Philip Nash
- Mutiny on the Bounty (1935) – Tahitian Native (uncredited)
- The Mysterious Avenger (1936) Lafe Lockhart
- The Clutching Hand (1936) – Frank Hobart
- Winds of the Wasteland (1936) – Jim – Pony Express Rider
- Mind Your Own Business (1936) – Scoutmaster Davis
- The Lion Man (1936)
- The Girl from Scotland Yard (1937) – Bertie
- The Hurricane (1937) – Terangi
- Sailor's Lady (1940) – Danny Malone
- South of Pago Pago (1940) – Kehane
- Kit Carson (1940) – Kit Carson
- Aloma of the South Seas (1941) – Tanoa
- The Tuttles of Tahiti (1942) – Chester
- Eagle Squadron (1942) – Hank Starr
- Invisible Agent (1942) – Frank Raymond
- Arabian Nights (1942) – Haroun-Al-Raschid
- White Savage (1943) – Kaloe
- Ali Baba and the Forty Thieves (1944) – Ali Baba
- Lady in the Dark (1944) – Randy Curtis
- Cobra Woman (1944) – Ramu
- The Invisible Man's Revenge (1944) – Robert Griffin
- Gypsy Wildcat (1944) – Michael
- San Diego, I Love You (1944) – John Thompson Caldwell IV
- Sudan (1945) – Merab
- Men in Her Diary (1945) – Randolph Glenning
- The Michigan Kid (1947) – Michigan Kid / Jim Rowen
- The Vigilantes Return (1947) – Marshal Johnnie Taggart / 'Ace' Braddock
- Last of the Redmen (1947) – Maj. Duncan Heyward
- The Prince of Thieves (1948) – Robin Hood
- The Mutineers (1949) – Nick Shaw
- Zamba (1949) – Steve
- Deputy Marshal (1949) – Deputy Ed Garry
- On the Isle of Samoa (1950) – Kenneth 'Ken' Crandall / John Reagan
- When the Redskins Rode (1951) – Prince Hannoc
- China Corsair (1951) – McMillan
- Hurricane Island (1951) – Captain Carlos Montalvo
- Brave Warrior (1952) – Steve Ruddell
- Last Train from Bombay (1952) – Martin Viking
- Hell Ship Mutiny (1957) – Capt. Jim Knight
- Forbidden Island (1959) – Dave Courtney
- The Beach Girls and the Monster (1965, also director and cinematographer) – Dr. Otto Lindsay (final film role)
- The Navy vs. the Night Monsters (1966, uncredited director of special photographic effects)
- Survival of Spaceship Earth (1972, director of special photographic effects)

Short Subjects:

- Picture People No. 4: Stars Day Off (1941) – Himself
- Screen Snapshots: Hollywood Shower of Stars (1955) – Himself
