= Harem Girl =

1952 film directed by Edward Bernds

- Theatrical release poster
- Directed by: Edward Bernds
- Screenplay by: Edward Bernds; Elwood Ullman
- Story by: Edward Bernds
- Produced by: Wallace MacDonald
- Starring: Joan Davis; Peggie Castle; Arthur Blake; Paul Marion; Donald Randolph; Henry Brandon
- Cinematography: Lester White
- Edited by: Richard Fantl
- Production company: Columbia Pictures
- Distributed by: Columbia Pictures
- Release date: January 8, 1952
- Running time: 71 minutes
- Country: United States
- Language: English

Harem Girl is a 1952 American comedy film directed by Edward Bernds, written by Bernds and Elwood Ullman and starring Joan Davis, Peggie Castle and Arthur Blake.

== Cast ==
- Joan Davis as Susie Perkins
- Peggie Castle as Princess Shareen
- Arthur Blake as Abdul Nassib
- Paul Marion as Majeed
- Donald Randolph as Jamal
- Henry Brandon as Hassan Ali
- Minerva Urecal as Aniseh
- Peter Mamakos as Sarab
- John Dehner as Khalil

== Release ==
The film opened in Syracuse, New York on January 8, 1952.

== Reception ==
In the New York Daily News, critic Dorothy Masters wrote: "In the interest of romance and politics, the comedienne is subject to every ignominy known to slapstick. ... Fortunately, the picture stops short of allowing her to join the Foreign Legion for further misadventures."
