= Lisa Ferraday =

American actress

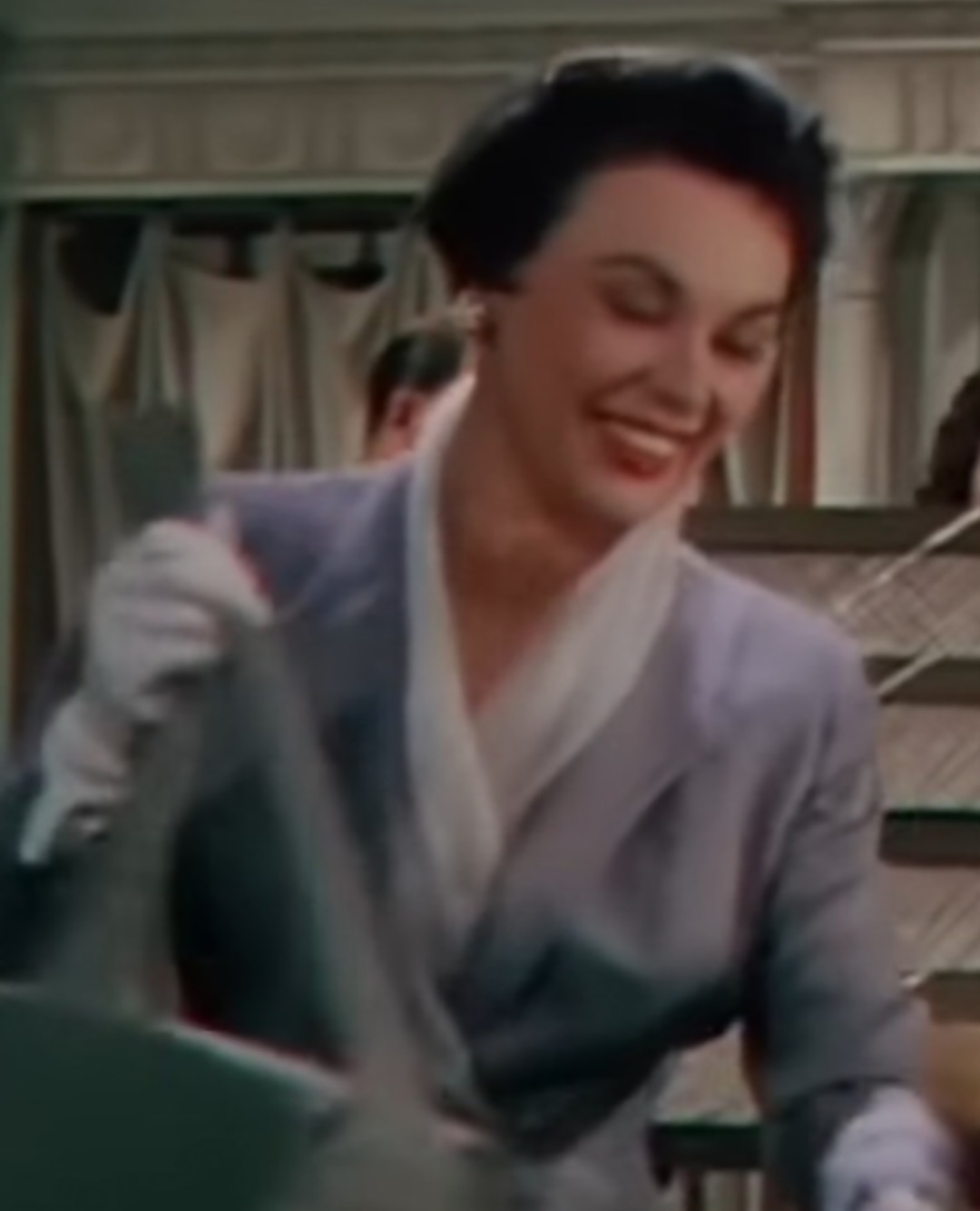
- Ferraday in The Snows of Kilimanjaro (1952)
- Born: Lisa Demezey; March 10, 1921; Arad, Romania
- Died: March 22, 2004 (aged 83); Palm Beach, Florida, U.S.
- Other names: Elisabeth De Mezey
- Occupation: Actress
- Years active: 1949–1956
- Spouse(s): E. L. Kincaid (m. 19??; div. 1951); John W. Anderson II (m. 1958; ??)
- Children: 1

Lisa Ferraday (born Lisa Demezey; March 10, 1921 – March 22, 2004) was a Romanian-American model and actress, who appeared in theatre, radio, and television, but is best known for her appearances as a leading lady in several Columbia Pictures films, during the 1950s, such as China Corsair.

== Early years ==
An only child, Ferraday was born Lisa Demezey, daughter of Transylvanian diplomat Baron Demezey. In her childhood, she learned to milk cows, care for chickens, and handle other responsibilities that were expected on the family's 7,000-acre (2,833-hectare) produce farm. Her mother and she moved to Paris after her father died, and Ferraday began studying acting despite objections from her family. During World War II, she stopped acting and became an International Red Cross interpreter. Soviet suspicions that she was a spy led to her imprisonment and torture. She eventually escaped to northern Italy.

== Career ==
Ferraday's films included Show Boat, Snows of Kilimanjaro, and The Merry Widow. In addition to acting, she worked as a production advisor in Hollywood, as a model, and as "a late-show disc jockey for a Hollywood TV station".

== Personal life ==
Ferraday married Air Force Colonel E.L. Kincaid and came to the United States in 1948. They divorced in 1951. On October 17, 1958, she married industrialist John W. Anderson II in Detroit. She had a daughter, Carol.

In 1954, Ferraday won a New York legal case about the proceeds of a $50,000 life insurance policy designated to go to her 7-year-old daughter. Financier A. Pam Blumenthal had taken out the policy, but his widow, Emily Blumenthal, sued, with her lawyer calling Ferraday "a homewrecker". The state supreme court jury awarded the money to Ferraday as guardian for her daughter.

== Filmography ==
Year	Title	Role	Notes
1949	Sky Liner	Mariette Le Fare	
1950	Under My Skin	Minor Role	Uncredited
1951	Flame of Stamboul	Lynette Garay	
1951	I Was an American Spy	Dorothy Fuentes	
1951	China Corsair	Tamara Liu Ming	
1951	Show Boat	Renée	Uncredited
1951	Too Young to Kiss	Nina Marescu	Uncredited
1952	The Belle of New York	Frenchie	Uncredited
1952	Rancho Notorious	Maxine	
1952	California Conquest	Helena de Gagarine	
1952	Last Train from Bombay	Charlane	
1952	The Merry Widow	Marcella	
1952	The Snows of Kilimanjaro	Vendeuse	Uncredited
1955	The Kentuckian	Gambler	Uncredited
1956	Death of a Scoundrel	Zina Monte	

== Bibliography ==
- Alan G. Fetrow. Feature Films, 1950-1959: A United States Filmography. McFarland, 1999.
