= Flame of Stamboul =

1951 film by Ray Nazarro

- Directed by: Ray Nazarro
- Written by: Daniel B. Ullman
- Produced by: Wallace MacDonald
- Starring: Richard Denning; Lisa Ferraday; Norman Lloyd
- Cinematography: Philip Tannura
- Edited by: James Sweeney
- Music by: Ross DiMaggio
- Production company: Columbia Pictures
- Distributed by: Columbia Pictures
- Release date: March 5, 1951
- Running time: 68 minutes
- Country: United States
- Language: English

Flame of Stamboul is a 1951 American thriller film directed by Ray Nazarro and starring Richard Denning, Lisa Ferraday and Norman Lloyd.

The film's sets were designed by the art director Cary Odell.

== Plot ==
A gang of criminals plans to steal important details about the defense of the Suez Canal and sell them to enemy powers.

== Cast ==
- Richard Denning as Larry Wilson
- Lisa Ferraday as Lynette Garay
- Norman Lloyd as Louie Baracca
- Nestor Paiva as Joe Octavian
- George Zucco as The Voice
- Donald Randolph as Hassan

== Production ==
Filming began on August 21, 1950 and was completed by early September.

== Bibliography ==
- Wesley Alan Britton. Onscreen and Undercover: The Ultimate Book of Movie Espionage. Greenwood, 2006.
