= The Prince of Thieves =

1948 film by Howard Bretherton

- Film poster
- Directed by: Howard Bretherton
- Screenplay by: Charles H. Schneer; Maurice Tombragel
- Based on: Le Prince des voleurs by Alexandre Dumas
- Produced by: Sam Katzman
- Starring: Jon Hall; Patricia Morison; Adele Jergens
- Cinematography: Fred Jackman Jr.
- Edited by: James Sweeney
- Music by: Various
- Production company: Columbia Pictures
- Release date: January 17, 1948 (USA)
- Running time: 72 minutes
- Country: United States
- Language: English
- Budget: $400,000

The Prince of Thieves is a 1948 American adventure film nominally inspired by Alexandre Dumas' 1872 novel Le Prince des voleurs. Produced by Sam Katzman for Columbia Pictures and starring Jon Hall as Robin Hood with stuntwork by Jock Mahoney, the film was shot in the Cinecolor process that features an inability to reproduce the colour green. Sequences were shot reusing several of the sets of Columbia's The Bandit of Sherwood Forest and at Corriganville. Patricia Morison and Adele Jergens co-star.

== Plot ==
After fighting in the Crusades alongside King Richard I of England, Sir Allan Claire is returning home to marry his betrothed Lady Christabel. He and his sister Lady Marian Claire are intercepted by Robin Hood and his band of Merry Men. Recognising a friend of King Richard, Robin informs them that Lady Christabel is to be married to another against her will in the interest of politics and her father's fortune. The three team up to rescue the fair lady.

== Cast ==
- Jon Hall as Robin Hood
- Patricia Morison as Lady Marian Claire
- Adele Jergens as Lady Christabel
- Alan Mowbray as The Friar
- Michael Duane as Sir Allan Claire
- H. B. Warner as Gilbert Head
- Robin Raymond as Maude
- Lowell Gilmore as Sir Phillip
- Belle Mitchell as Margaret Head (uncredited)
- Gavin Muir as Baron Tristram (uncredited)
- Walter Sande as Little John (uncredited)
- Syd Saylor as Will Scarlet (uncredited)
- Lewis Russell as Sir Fitz-Alwin (uncredited)

== Production ==
Alexander Dumas' 1872 novel was a translation of the 1836 romance Robin Hood and Little John, Or, The Merry Men of Sherwood Forest by English author Pierce Egan.

The idea for making the film came from Charles Schneer who worked for producer Sam Katzman. Katzman enjoyed making films from books in the public domain and Schneer discovered the title listed among the works of Alexander Dumas. Schneer's original intent was to write an original scenario just using the title, but once he had the work translated into English, Katzman wanted an adaptation of the book.

At this stage in his career, Katzman specialised in shooting musicals for Columbia over nine days with a budget of $140,000. He was so enthused by this project that he arranged to secure a budget of $400,000, including $100,000 for cast, and colour photography.

George Plympton was reported as working on the script in January 1947. Jon Hall's casting was announced in March.

Max Nosseck directed the main cast; Derwin Abrahams and Howard Bretherton directed the silent and action sequences respectively.

The censor objected to depictions of Friar Tuck being interested in worldly pleasures and the character had to be toned down.

== Critical reception ==
AllMovie called the film a "decided B-picture effort" and wrote that its Cinecolor "lacked the glowing luster" of the Technicolor used in the earlier The Bandit of Sherwood Forest; he also noted that the soundtrack was mostly stock music from the Columbia library. The reviewer also noted the movie's aim at younger audiences and male filmgoers, and concluded: "The one true oddity in the movie, and its most offbeat element, is the presence of Patricia Morison as Lady Marian, who seems to be exercising some of the shrewishness that would finally put her on the map as an actress, by way of the Broadway stage, a year later in Cole Porter's Kiss Me, Kate. All of these disparate elements may not hold together ideally, but with a running time of scarcely more than an hour and a cast that is trying hard to make it all fun, it's impossible for a picture like this to go far wrong, even if it gets nowhere near to being high art, either". TV Guide called the film "mainly a kiddie picture" and noted that "of the Merry Men, it is Mowbray as Friar Tuck who steals the show with a performance that borders on slapstick".

== See also ==
- List of films and television series featuring Robin Hood
