= Brave Warrior =

1952 film

- 1952 film poster
- Directed by: Spencer Gordon Bennet
- Written by: Robert E. Kent
- Produced by: Sam Katzman
- Starring: Jon Hall; Christine Larson
- Cinematography: William V. Skall
- Edited by: Aaron Stell
- Production company: Sam Katzman Productions
- Distributed by: Columbia Pictures
- Release date: June 1, 1952
- Running time: 73 minutes
- Country: United States
- Language: English

Brave Warrior is a 1952 Technicolor American Western film directed by Spencer Gordon Bennet and starring Jon Hall and Christine Larsen. The story is based on events during the War of 1812 and the Battle of Tippecanoe but contains historical inaccuracies, most notably that Tecumseh is depicted as siding with the Americans and not with the British.

== Plot ==
In the Indiana Territory of the early 19th century, conflict arises between the United States and Great Britain over territory and boundaries. Each side endeavors to gain the support of the Shawnee Indian tribes in the area. Governor William Henry Harrison enlists the aid of Steve Ruddell, whose friendship with the Shawnee chief Tecumseh dates back to childhood.

Tecumseh's leadership of the Shawnee is contested by his brother Tenskwatawa, known as the Prophet, who sides with the British. Tecumseh, who was a childhood playmate of Steve and of Laura McGregor, loves Steve as a brother and hopes to marry Laura, but she is in love with Steve. Laura's father Shayne McGregor secretly leads local support for the British against the Americans, even though it risks the life and love of his daughter. The events culminate in the Battle of Tippecanoe.

== Cast ==
- Jon Hall as Steve Ruddell
- Christine Larson as Laura MacGregor
- Jay Silverheels as Tecumseh
- Michael Ansara as Tenskwatawa, the Prophet
- Harry Cording as Shayne MacGregor
- James Seay as Gov. William Henry Harrison
- George Eldredge as Capt. Barny Demming
- Leslie Denison as General Henry Procter
- Rory Mallinson as Barker
- Rusty Wescoatt as Standish

== Production ==
The California locations of Agoura Ranch, Burro Flats in Simi Hills and Corriganville Movie Ranch were used for filming. Archival footage from When the Redskins Rode (1951) was also included.

== Reception ==
Brave Warrior was released on DVD on August 6, 2013 by Sony Pictures Home Entertainment.

== Sources ==
- Hilger, Michael (2015). Native Americans in the Movies: Portrayals from Silent Films to the Present. Lanham, Maryland: Rowman & Littlefield. p. 119. ISBN 978-1442240018.
- Gaberscek, Carlo; Stier, Kenny (2014). In Search of Western Movie Sites. Morrisville, North Carolina: Lulu Press, Inc. p. 152. ISBN 978-1312695672.
- Osterberg, Bertil O. (2000). Colonial America on Film and Television: A Filmography. New York City: McFarland & Company. p. 59. ISBN 978-0786408627.
- Pitts, Michael R. (2013). Western Movies: A Guide to 5,105 Feature Films (2nd ed.). New York City: McFarland & Company. p. 43. ISBN 978-0786463725.
- Reid, John Howard (2006). Great Hollywood Westerns: Classic Pictures, Must-See Movies and 'B' Films. Morrisville, North Carolina: Lulu Press, Inc. p. 17. ISBN 978-1430309680.
