= She Wouldn't Say Yes =

1945 film by Alexander Hall

- Directed by: Alexander Hall
- Screenplay by: Virginia Van Upp; John Jacoby; Sarett Tobias
- Story by: László Görög; Wilhelm Thiele
- Produced by: Virginia Van Upp
- Starring: Rosalind Russell; Lee Bowman; Adele Jergens
- Cinematography: Joseph Walker
- Edited by: Viola Lawrence
- Music by: Marlin Skiles
- Production company: Columbia Pictures
- Distributed by: Columbia Pictures
- Release date: November 29, 1945
- Running time: 87 minutes
- Country: United States
- Language: English

She Wouldn't Say Yes is a 1945 American screwball comedy film directed by Alexander Hall and starring Rosalind Russell, Lee Bowman and Adele Jergens. It was produced and distributed by Columbia Pictures.

== Plot ==
A psychiatrist, Dr. Susan Lane, is leaving a military hospital after spending two weeks working with patients there. Before she leaves, she encounters a patient reading a comic strip by Michael Kent. The comic's character, the Nixie, encourages people to act on their impulses by whistling in their ear. Dr. Lane explains to the patient that it's not good to act on their impulses. Colonel Brady, another psychiatrist, mentions to Dr. Lane that her confidence as a professional comes from some problem that she has repressed.

Later, at Grand Central Station, Dr. Lane picks up her train ticket and gets knocked down by another customer who apologizes. Several bumps and bruises later, she leaves and the customer—who turns out to be comic writer Michael Kent—picks up his ticket. At the last minute, the clerk—acting on his impulse because of the Nixie—switches Kent's ticket to be the same compartment as Dr. Lane's ticket.

On the train, Kent and Dr. Lane bump into each other again while at the bar. He continues to get on her nerves as the days pass. One day, he tricks her into marrying him.

== Cast ==
- Rosalind Russell as Dr. Susan A. Lane
- Lee Bowman as Michael Kent
- Adele Jergens as Allura
- Charles Winninger as Doctor Lane
- Harry Davenport as Albert
- Sara Haden as Laura Pitts
- Percy Kilbride as Judge Whittaker
- Lewis L. Russell as Colonel Brady
- Mary Treen as Train Passenger at Bar

Uncredited cast members include

- Russell Hicks as Mr. Lindsay
- Mabel Paige as Mrs. Martha Whittaker
- Cora Witherspoon as Mrs. Peterson
- Almira Sessions as Miss Downer
- Edward Gargan as Cab Driver
- Charles Arnt as Train Conductor
- George Cleveland as Ticket Seller
- Darren McGavin as Soldier in Hospital
- Sam McDaniel as Train Steward
- Carl Switzer as the Flower delivery boy
- Arthur Q. Bryan as Train Passenger in sleeping car
- Willie Best as Porter
- Jesse Graves as Porter
- Mantan Moreland as Porter
- Clarence Muse as Porter
- William Austin as Receptionist
- Ray Walker as Docter

== Production ==
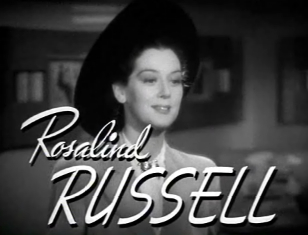
Rosalind Russell from The Feminine Touch 1941

The original working title for the film was Some Call It Love and was later changed to She Wouldn't Say Yes. Production for the film began on May 8, 1945, and went through July 14. 1945. Rosalind Russell had previously worked with director Alexander Hall on several films including My Sister Eileen from 1942 and This Thing Called Love from 1940.

Rosalind Russell was cast in the part of Dr. Susan Lane, an unmarried psychiatrist, happy to be single. Russell had a prolific film career with Metro-Goldwyn-Mayer starting in 1934, when she signed a seven-year contract with them. She had been nominated for an Academy Award three years earlier as Best Actress in a Leading Role for her part in My Sister Eileen.Lee Bowman played the part of Michael Kent, a cartoonist in the military who pens a comic strip, The Nixie, which encourages people to follow their impulses.

The release date of the film caused an anachronism in the plot: the traveling Kent character is en route to Japan, via San Francisco, and mentions at least three times he is "off to war"—but the war ended three months earlier.

== Release ==
She Wouldn't Say Yes was released to theatres on November 29, 1945. The film was adapted as a radio play for Screen Directors Playhouse and broadcast on June 2, 1950. The radio play was released as an audiobook on cassette in 1977.

=== Home media ===
She Wouldn't Say Yes was first released to the home video market on video cassette. The movie was released to DVD on August 4, 2009 as part of the Icons of Screwball Comedy, Volume 1 set along with If You Could Only Cook, Too Many Husbands, and My Sister Eileen.

== Bibliography ==
- Gabbard, Glen O.; Gabbard, Krin (1999). Psychiatry and the Cinema (2nd, illustrated ed.). Arlington, Virginia, USA: American Psychiatric Pub. ISBN 9780880489645. OCLC 39706805.
- staff (March 29, 1946). ""she Wouldn't Say Yes" .Rosalind Russell And Lee Bowman". Berkeley Daily Gazette. Berkeley, California, USA: Gazette Pub. Co. p. 1. OCLC 27723946.
- staff (February 5, 1946). "she Wouldn't Say Yes". The Miami News. Miami, Florida, USA: Cox Enterprises. p. 16. OCLC 10000467.
