= The Mutineers (film) =

1949 film by Jean Yarbrough

- Directed by: Jean Yarbrough
- Written by: Ben Bengal; Joseph Carole
- Story by: Dan Gordon
- Produced by: Sam Katzman
- Starring: Jon Hall; Adele Jergens; George Reeves
- Cinematography: Ira H. Morgan
- Edited by: James Sweeney
- Production company: Sam Katzman Productions
- Distributed by: Columbia Pictures
- Release date: April 22, 1949
- Running time: 60 minutes
- Country: United States
- Language: English

The Mutineers is a 1949 American adventure film directed by Jean Yarbrough starring Adele Jergens, George Reeves and Jon Hall. It was produced by Sam Katzman for release by Columbia Pictures. The film was also known under the alternative title Pirate Ship.

It was one of several movies Jon Hall made for Sam Katzman, the others including The Prince of Thieves'.

== Plot ==
Sailor Nick Shaw investigates the murder of a ship's captain.

== Cast ==
- Jon Hall as Nick Shaw
- Adele Jergens as Norma Harrison
- George Reeves as Thomas Nagle
- Noel Cravat as Dudley
- Don Harvey as Joe Miles
- Matt Willis as Toby Jarmin
- Tom Kennedy as Butch
- Pat Gleason as Rogers
- Frank Jacquet as Captain Stanton
- Lyle Talbot as Captain Jim Duncan

== Production ==
Filming started 27 October 1948. George Reeves, who just made Jungle Jim for Katzman, co-starred.
