= Last Train from Bombay =

1952 film

- Directed by: Fred F. Sears
- Written by: Robert Yale Libott
- Produced by: Sam Katzman
- Starring: Jon Hall; Christine Larson; Lisa Ferraday
- Cinematography: Henry Freulich
- Edited by: Richard Fantl
- Music by: Mischa Bakaleinikoff
- Production company: Esskay Pictures
- Distributed by: Columbia Pictures
- Release date: July 18, 1952 (San Francisco)
- Running time: 72 minutes
- Country: United States
- Language: English

Last Train from Bombay is a 1952 American thriller film directed by Fred F. Sears and starring Jon Hall, Christine Larson and Lisa Ferraday. It opened in San Francisco on July 18, 1952.

== Plot ==
An American diplomat is accused of murder during an Indian civil war and becomes involved in an assassination plot.

== Cast ==
- Jon Hall as Martin Viking
- Christine Larson as Mary Anne Palmer
- Lisa Ferraday as Charlane
- Douglas Kennedy as Kevin/Brian O'Hara
- Michael Fox as Captain Tamil
- Donna Martell as Nawob's Daughter
- Matthew Boulton as Col. Frederick Palmer
- James Fairfax as Alfie
- Gregory Gaye as B. Vornin, a.k.a. The Lame One
- Ken Terrell as Ceylonese Assassin
- George Eldredge as Mr. Bern
- Paul Marion as Hotel Clerk

== Production ==
The film's screenplay was based on the dispute between India and Pakistan. Columbia Pictures had originally attempted to cast Jon Hall's wife Frances Langford to star with him. Last Train from Bombay is the last of several films in which Hall appeared for producer Sam Katzman.

Filming began on March 11, 1952. Location shooting took place at the San Fernando Tunnel, Lockheed Air Terminal, Southern Pacific Railroad station in Glendale and the Iverson Movie Ranch. The sets were designed by the art director Paul Palmentola.

== Reception ==
In the New York Daily News, critic Dorothy Masters called the film "a fabulously active, frequently suspenseful picture which has better direction than performances".
