= When the Redskins Rode =

1951 film by Lew Landers

- Directed by: Lew Landers
- Written by: Robert E. Kent
- Produced by: Sam Katzman
- Starring: Jon Hall; Mary Castle; James Seay
- Cinematography: Lester White
- Edited by: Richard Fantl
- Music by: Mischa Bakaleinikoff
- Production company: Esskay Pictures Corporation
- Distributed by: Columbia Pictures
- Release date: May 30, 1951
- Running time: 78 minutes
- Country: United States
- Language: English

When the Redskins Rode is a 1951 American historical Western film directed by Lew Landers and starring Jon Hall, Mary Castle and James Seay. The film is loosely based on the events leading up to the outbreak of the French and Indian War.

The film is one of several produced during the 1950s that portray politics in Colonial America as a precursor to the Westerns of the more common setting of the 19th century.

== Plot ==
In Williamsburg, Virginia in 1753, Hannoc, a young prince of the Delaware, allies with the British against the French, who are encroaching south from Canada. French spy Elizabeth Leeds tries to seduce Hannoc in order to prevent him from bringing his people into the war on the British side.

However, despite the appeals of his son, Hannoc's father Shingiss attempts to maintain neutral. Shingiss is disturbed that Hannoc has become too anglicized and abandoned his native ways, including his rejection of his intended Delaware bride Morna. Eventually a French attack on their lands drives the Delawares into formal alliance with England and they arrive just in time to assist the beleaguered colonial garrison under George Washington at Fort Necessity.

== Cast ==
- Jon Hall as Prince Hannoc
- Mary Castle as Elizabeth Leeds
- James Seay as Colonel George Washington
- John Ridgely as Christopher Gist
- Sherry Moreland as Morna
- Pedro de Cordoba as Chief Shingiss
- John Dehner as John Delmont
- Lewis L. Russell as Governor Dinwiddie
- William Bakewell as Appleby
- Jessie Arnold as Gossip at Wrestling Match
- Jack Chefe as French Lieutenant
- J.W. Cody as Mogama
- Gregory Gaye as St. Pierre
- Charles Horvath as Michel
- Milton Kibbee as Davey
- Harold Miller as Man Seated in Tavern
- Steve Pendleton as Appleby's Friend
- Rick Vallin as Duprez
- Rusty Wescoatt as Znueau

== Production ==
Filming began on August 8, 1950.

The film was the first of five to employ Supercinecolor, a new three-strip Cinecolor process.

== Bibliography ==
- David Eldridge. Hollywood's History Films. I.B.Tauris, 2006.
- Bertil O. Österberg. Colonial America on Film and Television: A Filmography. McFarland, 2000.
