= The Lion Man (1936 film) =

1936 film by John P. McCarthy

- Film poster
- Directed by: John P. McCarthy
- Written by: Richard Gordon; John Willimas; Edgar Rice Burroughs (story)
- Produced by: Arthur Alexander; Max Alexander
- Starring: Jon Hall
- Cinematography: Robert E. Cline
- Production company: Normandy Pictures
- Distributed by: First Division Pictures
- Release date: 1936
- Running time: 67 minutes
- Country: United States
- Language: English

The Lion Man is a 1936 American film very loosely based on The Lad and the Lion by Edgar Rice Burroughs, and the 1917 silent movie of the same title. It was directed by John P. McCarthy and produced by Arthur Alexander and Max Alexander. The film stars Jon Hall then appearing under his real name Charles Locher and Kathleen Burke who had recently co-starred in The Lives of a Bengal Lancer. The Lion Man was re-released as a "Tarzan Vs the Lion Man" double feature in the late 1940s.

According to Filmink "Hall doesn’t appear until half-way through the story but he’s not bad and handles the fight scenes well. However, The Lion Man was not widely seen – it was very cheap, and there were legal issues with the Burroughs estate."

== Cast ==
- Jon Hall as Ed Lion (as Charles Locher)
- Kathleen Burke as Eulilah
- Ted Adams as Sheikh Youssef Ab-Dur
- Jimmy Aubrey as Simmonds
- Richard Carlyle as Hassan El Dinh
