= Phantom Lady (disambiguation) =

Phantom Lady may refer to:

- Phantom Lady, a comic superhero originally from the 1940s
- Phantom Lady (novel), a 1942 crime novel by Cornell Woolrich

- Phantom Lady (film), a film noir adaptation of the novel

- The Phantom Lady (La dama duende), a 17th-century Spanish play
- The Phantom Lady (film), a 1945 Argentine film
- "Phantom Lady" (Altered Carbon), a 2020 television episode
