= Samuel S. Hinds =

American actor (1875–1948)

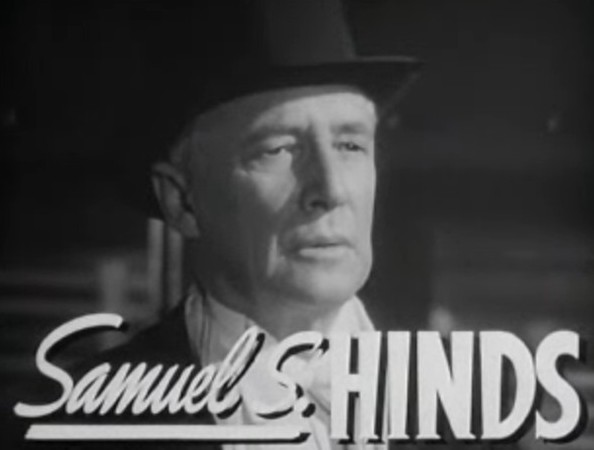
- from the trailer for Grand Central Murder (1942)
- Born: Samuel Southey Hinds; April 4, 1875; Brooklyn, New York, U.S.
- Died: October 13, 1948 (aged 73); Pasadena, California, U.S.
- Resting place: Inglewood Park Cemetery
- Occupation: Actor
- Years active: 1926–48
- Spouse(s): Dorothy Cruickshank (m. 1914; div. 19??)
- Children: 2
- Relatives: Robert Southey (great-grandfather)

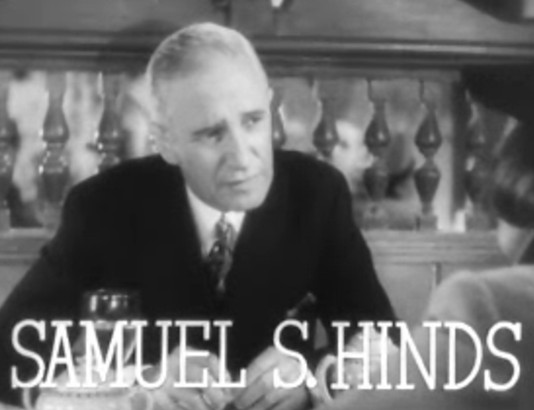
Samuel Hinds in Stage Door (1937)

Samuel Southey Hinds (April 4, 1875 – October 13, 1948) was an American actor and former lawyer. He was often cast as kindly authority figures and appeared in more than 200 films in a career lasting 22 years. Hinds is perhaps best remembered for playing Peter Bailey, the kindly father of James Stewart and founder of the Bailey Building and Loan, in It's a Wonderful Life (1946) and for his portrayal of Paul Sycamore in You Can't Take It with You (1938), both films directed by Frank Capra.

== Early life and education ==
Hinds was born in Brooklyn, New York, the son of Joseph E. Hinds and Mary A. Beetham Hinds. He was a great-grandson of poet Robert Southey. His father was the president of the United States Playing Card Company,

He was a graduate of Phillips Andover Academy, Harvard Law School, and New York University Law School and worked for more than 32 years as a lawyer before becoming a professional actor. After he lost most of his money in the financial crisis of 1929, Hinds retired as a lawyer and joined the Pasadena Community Playhouse. He started acting in Broadway shows at age 54.

== Career ==
Besides his work in Frank Capra's films, Hinds was also known for dozens of films produced by Universal Pictures, including four Abbott and Costello comedies, four Gloria Jean musicals, and five Little Tough Guys adventures. He also portrayed Lew Ayres's father in the Dr. Kildare film series during the early 1940s. Hinds mostly played supporting roles, often kind and dignified authority figures; often lawyers, doctors, mayors, judges. or the father of the main figure.

Hinds' first film was The Amateur Gentleman (1926); his second film was If I Had A Million (1932). His earlier career was reflected in the role of Judge Thatcher, tortured by the mad Dr. Richard Vollin (Bela Lugosi) in The Raven (1935).

Hinds acted in a total of about 220 films. His last film was The Bribe, released in 1949, after his death.

== Death ==
Hinds died of pneumonia in Pasadena, California, on October 13, 1948, at age 73. He was married to Dorothy Cruikshank. They had two children and were divorced.

== Selected filmography ==
- The Amateur Gentleman (1926) as Charles - Marquis of Jerningham (uncredited) (film debut)
- If I Had a Million (1932) as Lawyer (uncredited)
- The Crime of the Century (1933) as Philip Ames
- Murders in the Zoo (1933) as Banquet Guest (uncredited)
- Gabriel Over the White House (1933) as Dr. H.L. Eastman
- The Nuisance (1933) as Mr. Beaumont
- Bed of Roses (1933) as Father Doran
- Deluge (1933) as Chief Forecaster
- This Day and Age (1933) as Mayor - George
- One Man's Journey (1933) as Dr. Babcock
- Lady for a Day (1933) as Mayor (uncredited)
- Penthouse (1933) as Stuyvesant - Durant's Law Partner (uncredited)
- Berkeley Square (1933) as American Ambassador
- Hold the Press (1933) as R.T. Taylor
- Day of Reckoning (1933) as O'Farrell
- Fog (1933) as Dickens
- Little Women (1933) as Mr. March
- The World Changes (1933) as A Banker (uncredited)
- Son of a Sailor (1933) as Admiral Farnsworth
- The Women in His Life (1933) as Thomas J. Worthing
- Convention City (1933) as McAllister
- Straightaway (1933)
- Let's Fall in Love (1933) as New York Executive (uncredited)
- The Big Shakedown (1934) as Kohlsadt - Board Member (uncredited)
- Massacre (1934) as Judge Eldridge (uncredited)
- You Can't Buy Everything (1934) as Henry - Banking Clerk (uncredited)
- The Ninth Guest (1934) as Dr. Murray Reid
- The Crime Doctor (1934) as Ballard
- No Greater Glory (1934) as Gareb's Grandfather
- Men in White (1934) as Dr. Gordon
- Sisters Under the Skin (1934) as Winters
- Manhattan Melodrama (1934) as Warden of Sing Sing (uncredited)
- Sadie McKee (1934) as Dr. Branch (uncredited)
- The Most Precious Thing in Life (1934) as Dean (uncredited)
- Operator 13 (1934) as Officer Price (uncredited)
- Baby, Take a Bow (1934) as Warden (uncredited)
- The Defense Rests (1934) as Dean Adams
- His Greatest Gamble (1934) as Dr. Owen (uncredited)
- Hat, Coat, and Glove (1934) as John Walters (uncredited)
- The Cat's-Paw (1934) as Rev. Julian Cobb - Missionary (uncredited)
- She Was a Lady (1934) as Mr. Traill (uncredited)
- Have a Heart (1934) as Dr. Spear
- A Lost Lady (1934) as Jim Sloane
- Evelyn Prentice (1934) as Mr. Newton - Party Guest (uncredited)
- A Wicked Woman (1934) as Judge (uncredited)
- Mils of the Gods (1934) as Burroughs
- Sequoia (1934) as Dr. Matthew Martin
- West of the Pecos (1934) as Colonel Lambeth
- Behind the Evidence (1935) as J.T. Allen
- Bordertown (1935) as Judge at First Trial (uncredited)
- Wings in the Dark (1935) as Kennel Club Secretary (uncredited)
- Rumba (1935) as Henry B. Harrison
- Devil Dogs of the Air (1935) as Fleet Commander (uncredited)
- Shadow of Doubt (1935) as Thomas Granby
- Law Beyond the Range (1935) as Editor George Alexander (uncredited)
- Death Flies East (1935) as Professor Grayson (uncredited)
- Living on Velvet (1935) as Henry L. Parker
- Private Worlds (1935) as Dr. Arnold
- West Point of the Air (1935) as Secretary of War (uncredited)
- Black Fury (1935) as Judge (uncredited)
- Strangers All (1935) as Charles Green
- College Scandal (1935) as Mr. Cummings
- The Raven (1935) as Judge Thatcher
- She (1935) as John Vincey (uncredited)
- Accent on Youth (1935) as Benham (uncredited)
- Annapolis Farewell (1935) as Dr. Bryant
- The Big Broadcast of 1936 (1935) as Captain
- Two-Fisted (1935) as Mr. Pritchard
- Dr. Socrates (1935) as Dr. McClintick
- Rendezvous (1935) as John Carter
- Bad Boy (1935) as Husband (uncredited)
- In Person (1935) as Dr. Aaron Sylvester
- Millions in the Air (1935) as Colonel Edwards
- The Reckless Way (1936)
- Timothy's Quest (1936) as Rev. Fellows
- The Trail of the Lonesome Pine (1936) as Sheriff
- Woman Trap (1936) as Senator Andrews
- Fatal Lady (1936) as Guili Ruffano
- Border Flight (1936) as Commander Mosely
- Rhythm on the Range (1936) as Robert Halloway
- His Brother's Wife (1936) as Dr. Claybourne
- Sworn Enemy (1936) as Eli Decker
- The Longest Night (1936) as Hastings, Store Manager
- Love Letters of a Star (1936) as Artemus Todd
- Black Legion (1937) as Judge
- The Mighty Treve (1937) as Uncle Joel Fenno
- She's Dangerous (1937) as Warden
- Top of the Town (1937) as Henry Borden
- Night Key (1937) as Stephen Ranger
- Wings Over Honolulu (1937) as Adm. Furness
- The Road Back (1937) as Defense Attorney
- Double or Nothing (1937) as Jonathan Clark
- The Lady Fights Back (1937) as Judge Cartwright (uncredited)
- Stage Door (1937) as Henry Sims
- A Girl with Ideas (1937) as Rodding Carter
- Navy Blue and Gold (1937) as Richard Gates Sr.
- Prescription for Romance (1937) as Major Goddard
- The Jury's Secret (1938) as Brandon Williams
- Double Danger (1938) as Police Commissioner David Theron
- Forbidden Valley (1938) as Jeff Hazzard
- Test Pilot (1938) as General Ross
- The Devil's Party (1938) as Justice Harrison
- Wives Under Suspicion (1938) as David Marrow
- The Rage of Paris (1938) as Mr. William Duncan Sr.
- Little Tough Guy (1938) as 1st Judge (voice, uncredited)
- The Road to Reno (1938) as Sylvia's Attorney
- You Can't Take It with You (1938) as Paul Sycamore
- Personal Secretary (1938) as Alan Lemke
- Swing That Cheer (1938) as Coach McGann
- Young Dr. Kildare (1938) as Dr. Stephen Kildare
- The Storm (1938) as Capt. Kenny
- Little Tough Guys in Society (1938) as Judge (uncredited)
- Secrets of a Nurse (1938) as Judge Corrigan
- Newsboys' Home (1938) as Howard Price Dutton
- Pirates of the Skies (1939) as Police Commissioner
- Within the Law (1939) as Mr. Gilder
- Calling Dr. Kildare (1939) as Dr. Stephen Kildare
- Ex-Champ (1939) as Boxing Commissioner Edward P. Nash
- Career (1939) as Clem Bartholomew
- The Under-Pup (1939) as Dr. McKay
- Hawaiian Nights (1939) as Lane
- Tropic Fury (1939) as J.P. Waterford
- Rio (1939) as Lamartine
- Hero for a Day (1939) as 'Dutch' Bronson
- One Hour to Live (1939) as Commissioner Cromwell
- First Love (1939) as Mr. Parker
- The Secret of Dr. Kildare (1939) as Dr. Stephen Kildare
- Destry Rides Again (1939) as Judge Slade
- Charlie McCarthy, Detective (1939) as Court Aldrich
- Zanzibar (1940) as Dale
- It's a Date (1940) as Sidney Simpson
- Dr. Kildare's Strange Case (1940) as Dr. Stephen Kildare
- Ski Patrol (1940) as Captain Per Vallgren
- The Boys from Syracuse (1940) as Angeen
- Dr. Kildare Goes Home (1940) as Dr. Stephen Kildare
- Spring Parade (1940) as Von Zimmel
- A Little Bit of Heaven (1940) as Doctor (uncredited)
- I'm Nobody's Sweetheart Now (1940) as George P. Morgan
- Seven Sinners (1940) as Governor
- Trail of the Vigilantes (1940) as George Preston
- Buck Privates (1941) as Major General Emerson
- Back Street (1941) as Felix Darren
- Man Made Monster (1941) as Dr. John Lawrence
- The Lady from Cheyenne (1941) as Governor Howard
- Adventure in Washington (1941) as Senator Henry Owen
- Tight Shoes (1941) as Horace Grover, 'the Brain'
- Blossoms in the Dust (1941) as Mr. Kahly
- The Shepherd of the Hills (1941) as Andy Beeler
- Dr. Kildare's Wedding Day (1941) as Dr. Stephen Kildare
- Unfinished Business (1941) as Uncle
- Badlands of Dakota (1941) as Wilbur Grayson (uncredited)
- Mob Town (1941) as Judge Luther Bryson
- Road Agent (1941) as Banker Sam Leavitt
- Hellzapoppin' (1941) as Showboat Captain (uncredited)
- Don Winslow of the Navy (1942, Serial) as Admiral Colby, The CINC-US [Ch. 1]
- Jail House Blues (1942) as Mr. Thomas Daniels
- Frisco Lil (1942) as James Brewster
- Ride 'Em Cowboy (1942) as Sam Shaw
- The Strange Case of Doctor Rx (1942) as Dudley Crispin
- Kid Glove Killer (1942) as Mayor Daniels
- The Spoilers (1942) as Judge Horace Stillman
- Grand Central Murder (1942) as Roger Furness
- Lady in a Jam (1942) as Doctor Brewster
- Pardon My Sarong (1942) as Chief Kolua
- Pittsburgh (1942) as Morgan Prentiss
- Hi, Buddy (1943) as Army Commander (uncredited)
- Keep 'Em Slugging (1943) as Carruthers
- It Ain't Hay (1943) as Col. Brainard
- He's My Guy (1943) as Johnson
- Follow the Band (1943) as Pop Turnbull
- Good Morning, Judge (1943) as J.P. Gordon
- Mister Big (1943) as Jeremy Taswell
- Hers to Hold (1943) as Dr. Crane
- We've Never Been Licked (1943) as Col. Jason Craig
- Fired Wife (1943) as Judge Towne
- Larceny with Music (1943) as Brewster
- Top Man (1943) as Mr. Fairchild
- Son of Dracula (1943) as Judge Simmons
- Sing a Jingle (1944) as J.P. Crane
- Phantom Lady (1944) as Judge (voice, uncredited)
- Chip Off the Old Block (1944) as Dean Manning
- Ladies Courageous (1944) as Brig. Gen. Wade
- The Great Alaskan Mystery (1944) as Herman Brock [Chs. 3-13]
- Follow the Boys (1944) as Officer (uncredited)
- Cobra Woman (1944) as Father Paul
- Jungle Woman (1944) as Coroner
- South of Dixie (1944) as Col. Andrew J. Morgan
- The Singing Sheriff (1944) as Seth
- Frisco Sal (1945) as Doc
- I'll Remember April (1945) as Garrett Garfield
- Escape in the Desert (1945) as Gramp
- Swing Out, Sister (1945) as Rufus Mariman
- Secret Agent X-9 (1945) as Solo
- Lady on a Train (1945) as Mr. Wiggam
- The Strange Affair of Uncle Harry (1945) as Dr. Adams
- Men in Her Diary (1945) as Judge Bergen
- Week-End at the Waldorf (1945) as Mr. Jessup
- Scarlet Street (1945) as Charles Pringle
- Blonde Alibi (1946) as Prof. Slater
- Strange Conquest (1946) as Dr. Graves
- The Runaround (1946) as Norman Hampton
- Inside Job (1946) as Judge Kincaid
- Danger Woman (1946) as Dean Albert Sears
- Little Miss Big (1946) as Wilfred Elliott
- White Tie and Tails (1946) as Mr. Bradford
- It's a Wonderful Life (1946) as Peter "Pa" Bailey
- The Egg and I (1947) as Sheriff
- Time Out of Mind (1947) as Dr. Weber
- Slave Girl (1947) as Senator Claibourne (uncredited)
- Call Northside 777 (1948) as Judge Charles Moulton (uncredited)
- Perilous Waters (1948) as Dana Ferris
- The Return of October (1948) as Judge Northridge
- The Boy with Green Hair (1948) as Dr. Knudson
- The Bribe (1949) as Dr. Warren (final film role)
