= The Strange Affair of Uncle Harry =

1945 film noir

- Theatrical release poster
- Directed by: Robert Siodmak
- Screenplay by: Stephen Longstreet; Keith Winter (adaptation)
- Based on: Uncle Harry by Thomas Job
- Produced by: Joan Harrison
- Starring: George Sanders; Geraldine Fitzgerald; Ella Raines
- Cinematography: Paul Ivano
- Edited by: Arthur Hilton
- Music by: Hans J. Salter; Paul Dessau
- Production company: Universal Pictures
- Distributed by: Universal Pictures
- Release date: 17 August 1945 (United States)
- Running time: 80 minutes
- Country: United States
- Language: English

The Strange Affair of Uncle Harry, also known as Uncle Harry and The Zero Murder Case, is a 1945 American film noir directed by Robert Siodmak and starring George Sanders, Geraldine Fitzgerald and Ella Raines. It is based on the stage play Uncle Harry by Thomas Job, which was first performed in 1938.

== Plot ==
Harry Quincey is an amiable middle-aged bachelor working as a designer in a fabric mill in the small New England town of Corinth. Younger people in town call him "Uncle Harry". He lives in the family's mansion with his two sisters, the younger Lettie and the older Hester. Lettie idles days away in bed, feigning numerous ailments. Although the Quinceys were once rich and influential, their money was lost in the Great Depression, and it is Harry's occupation which secures the family's income.

Everything is disrupted by the arrival of a new female designer at the mill, Deborah, an elegant young woman from New York City. Harry and Deborah develop an interest in each other, supported by Hester but watched suspiciously by the jealous and domineering Lettie. When Deborah tells Harry that she will be taking an extended trip to Europe with her employer Warren, he finally declares his love for her. They plan to get married and live in the family's house, but this means the sisters finding a new home. While this is not an issue for Hester, Lettie is resistant, rejecting all proposals by the local estate agent.

After several months of having their plans sabotaged by Lettie, Deborah persuades Harry to run off to New York together and get married that evening. Their plan is thwarted when Lettie collapses in church and is taken to the hospital. Deborah demands that Harry choose between Lettie and her, but Harry insists that he cannot leave his sister as long as she is ill. Deborah leaves him in disappointment. When the bedridden Lettie hears the news of Deborah and Warren's marriage a few weeks later, she quickly recovers. Hester openly blames her sister for her scheme in front of Harry. Lettie explains that in her eyes, a young woman like Deborah was not the right choice for Harry from the start.

Harry finds a poison in Lettie's desk which she bought to relieve their old pet dog from his pain. He slips the poison into Lettie's hot chocolate, but the cups get mixed up and it is Hester who dies. The housekeeper enters and, since the sisters were always arguing, assumes Lettie poisoned Hester. Harry allows the accusation to stand and, after a trial, Lettie is sentenced to hang. The conscience-stricken Harry confesses to the prison governor that it was he who poisoned his sister, but to no avail: the governor assumes that Harry is only trying to save his sister. During the siblings' last meeting, Lettie openly admits that she will leave Harry behind with the life-long guilt on his shoulders.

Harry awakens, the poison in his hand, realising that Hester's death and Lettie's trial had only been a dream. Deborah enters the room and says she did not go through with the wedding to Warren, as it is Harry whom she loves. Harry and Deborah decide to leave quickly for New York as they had planned.

== Cast ==
- George Sanders as Harry Melville Quincey
- Geraldine Fitzgerald as Lettie Quincey
- Ella Raines as Deborah Brown
- Sara Allgood as Nona
- Moyna Macgill as Hester Quincey
- Samuel S. Hinds as Dr. Adams
- Harry von Zell as Ben (as Harry VonZell)
- Judy Clark as Helen
- Coulter Irwin as Biff Wagner (as Coulter F. Irwin)
- Craig Reynolds as John Warren

== Production ==
After their collaboration on the 1944 Phantom Lady, producer Joan Harrison chose Thomas Job's stage play Uncle Harry as the next project with director Robert Siodmak. Uncle Harry had seen a successful Broadway production that ran for 430 performances in 1942. The screenplay which Harrison and Siodmak agreed to produce contained a frame narrative which showed the conscience-stricken Harry, unable to cope with his guilt for going unpunished for his crime, at the town's station, waiting to be sent to a mental institution. This ending had been, with some reservations, classified as acceptable by censor Joseph Breen, contrary to the original play, as a delinquent protagonist not brought to justice would be rejected by the Production Code Association (PCA). (Previously planned adaptations by RKO and Twentieth Century Fox, which had met with Breen's objections, remained unrealised.)

Prior to the film's scheduled August 1945 release, Universal studio's production manager Martin Murphy insisted on re-cuts and the adding of the "dream ending" to get the PCA's approval. In his autobiography, Siodmak claimed that after repeated test screenings, his original cut was reinstated, and that the dream ending, although a compromise invented to appease the censors, was his idea. According to Siodmak biographer Joseph Greco, Siodmak refused to shoot the forced-upon ending (reportedly, five different endings had been presented at the test screenings), so the final scene had to be shot by an uncredited Roy William Neill. The film did poorly at the box office, and as a consequence of the studio's conduct in the matter, Joan Harrison ended her association with Universal and produced her next film for RKO. In later years, The Strange Affair of Uncle Harry was also released in a heavily edited reissue version titled The Zero Murder Case.

== Reception ==
In his 1945 New York Times review, critic Bosley Crowther described the film as "a drab and monotonous succession of routine episodes" with a "script [that] is pictorially cut-and-dried." Crowther also noted that "Siodmak's direction is curiously slow and stiff" and that "George Sanders is badly miscast as the murderous Milquetoast, giving neither an illusion of timidity nor the menace of ugly temperament." In The Nation in 1945, critic James Agee stated, "It may be unforgivably decadent of me, but I cannot get much excited about incest ... I am, however, definitely excited by watching characters in conflict with themselves and with others; by the beauty, intelligence, and ability of Geraldine Fitzgerald ... I imagine the two people most to be thanked for so intelligently casting, specifying, and bringing to life this generally superior movie are the producer, Joan Harrison, and the director, Robert Siodmak. Nobody is to be thanked for the asinine ending."

In later years, reviewers spoke more in favour of the film. Glenn Erickson rated it as a "perfect little picture of its kind, with impressive performances and an intriguing theme", and Geoff Andrew (Time Out) saw an "impressive psychological study in various forms of obsession" with a "superb and unusually touching" performance by Sanders.
