= Inside Job (1946 film) =

1946 film by Jean Yarbrough

- Theatrical release poster
- Directed by: Jean Yarbrough
- Screenplay by: George Bricker; Jerry Warner
- Story by: Tod Browning; Garrett Fort
- Produced by: Ben Pivar; Jean Yarbrough
- Starring: Preston Foster; Ann Rutherford; Alan Curtis; Milburn Stone
- Cinematography: Maury Gertsman
- Edited by: Otto Ludwig
- Production company: Universal Pictures
- Distributed by: Universal Pictures
- Release dates: June 14, 1946 (New York City); June 28, 1946 (United States)
- Running time: 65 minutes
- Country: United States
- Language: English

Inside Job is a 1946 American crime film noir directed by Jean Yarbrough starring Preston Foster, Ann Rutherford, Alan Curtis and Milburn Stone.

== Plot ==
An ex-convict, Eddie Norton, now reformed and working in a straight job at a department store, is found by his former partner, Bart Madden, and blackmailed into helping him rob the department store payroll. Norton decides to pull off the job and take all of the money for himself and his wife, Claire, who was previously unaware of his record.

One night after the store is closed, Norton cracks the safes and takes nearly a quarter of a million dollars. Madden learns quickly of the double cross but cannot find Norton who is in hiding with Claire. Norton finally arranges to be driven out of the city to start a new life but an informant tells Madden of his whereabouts. Madden arrives at Norton's boarding room just as the couple are about to leave. He knocks on Norton's door but a neighbor who is a police officer arrives at the critical moment with Christmas shopping for his family. Madden turns and shoots the police officer who returns fire wounding Madden who subsequently dies.

Norton is persuaded by his wife to try to save the police officer's life but it is at the cost of being found by the police and prosecuted.

== Cast ==
- Preston Foster as Bart Madden
- Ann Rutherford as Claire Gray Norton
- Alan Curtis as Eddie Norton aka Eddie Mitchell
- Milburn Stone as District Attorney Sutton
- Samuel S. Hinds as Judge Kincaid
- Joe Sawyer as Police Capt. Thomas
- Marc Lawrence as Donovan
- John Berkes as Freddie
- Jimmy Moss as Skipper
- Howard Freeman as Mr. Winkle
- William Trenk as Cordet
- Oliver Blake as Herman
- Joan Shawlee as Ruth

== Reception ==
=== Critical response ===
When the film was released, film critic Bosley Crowther panned the film in his review, "All this is played out in tedious fashion before justice is satisfied, and Inside Job thankfully gives way to the newsreels and a couple of short subjects, which, though not too good either, are infinitely better than the main attraction."
