= A Dangerous Profession =

1949 film by Ted Tetzlaff

- Theatrical release poster
- Directed by: Ted Tetzlaff
- Written by: Warren Duff; Martin Rackin
- Produced by: Robert Sparks executive Sid Rogell
- Starring: George Raft; Ella Raines; Pat O'Brien
- Narrated by: Jim Backus
- Cinematography: Robert De Grasse
- Edited by: Frederic Knudtson
- Music by: Frederick Hollander (as Frederick Hollander)
- Production company: RKO Radio Pictures
- Distributed by: RKO Radio Pictures
- Release date: November 26, 1949 (US)
- Running time: 79 minutes
- Country: United States
- Language: English

A Dangerous Profession is a 1949 American film noir directed by Ted Tetzlaff, written by Warren Duff and Martin Rackin, and starring George Raft, Ella Raines and Pat O'Brien. The film was one of a series of thrillers in which Raft appeared in the late 1940s, with decreasing commercial results.

== Plot ==
Police lieutenant Nick Ferrone explains the work of bail bondsmen. One such man is Vince Kane, a former police detective who worked with Ferrone. When one of his customers, Claude Brackett, is murdered, Kane investigates, not only because of his curiosity as a former cop; he has also fallen in love with Brackett's widow Lucy, an old flame.

== Cast ==
- George Raft as Vince Kane
- Ella Raines as Lucy Brackett
- Pat O'Brien as Joe Farley
- Bill Williams as Claude Brackett
- Jim Backus as Police Lt. Nick Ferrone
- Roland Winters as Jerry McKay
- Betty Underwood as Elaine Storm
- Robert Gist as Roy Collins, aka Max Gibney
- David Bauer as Matthew Dawson (as David Wolfe)

== Production ==
The screenplay was written from a script written by Warren Duff and Martin Rackin, and the film's working title was The Bail Bond Story. The project was originally sought by Humphrey Bogart's company, and later Fred MacMurray optioned it for his company, but he allowed the option to expire. The script was eventually bought by RKO.

A Dangerous Profession is the fourth film that George Raft made for RKO following World War II, following Johnny Angel, Nocturne and Race Street. Raft was meant to star in The Big Steal but had been delayed making Johnny Allegro, and he was replaced by Robert Mitchum. With Raft available, RKO assigned him A Dangerous Profession instead.

In February 1949, Howard Hughes announced that Lewis Milestone would direct the film and that Raft would star alongside O'Brien and Jane Russell. However, the director position was ultimately assigned to Ted Tetzlaff.

Production was delayed in order to allow Pat O'Brien to appear in a stage production of What Price Glory?, directed by John Ford. Filming began in May 1949. Jean Wallace, who had been hurried back from Paris to play the female lead, was fired after several days, with RKO explaining that she "is not suited to the role." Hughes offered the role to Ella Raines, who had been in England but was rushed to Hollywood.

The film's title was changed to A Dangerous Profession in September.

== Reception ==
In a contemporary review for The New York Times, critic A. H. Weiler wrote: "[I]n this latest exercise in crime and punishment, Mr. Raft, an ex-cop, now a bail bondsman, explores both sides of the law, and is grimly noble and romantic in circumstances that hardly seem worth the trouble. And the trouble in this case is fairly routine but the motivations for all the fireworks are vague and confusing. 'A Dangerous Profession,' in short, proves that the bail-bond business can be dangerous and that it also can be the basis for an exceedingly ordinary adventure."

George Raft's three previous films for RKO were profitable, but A Dangerous Profession recorded a loss of $280,000.

Pat O'Brien referred to the film in his memoirs as "a real dog. "Everyone," my agent said, "connected with it should have been locked up without benefit of bail before it ever went into production.""
