= Alan Curtis (American actor) =

American actor (1909–1953)

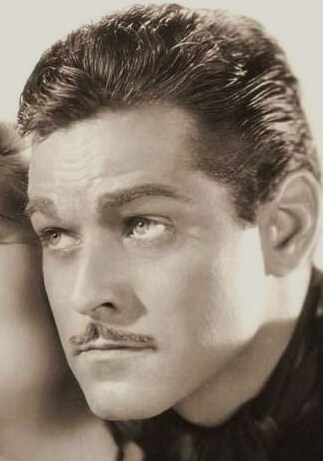
- Curtis in Two Tickets to London (1943)
- Born: Harry David Ueberroth; July 24, 1909; Chicago, Illinois, U.S.
- Died: February 2, 1953 (aged 43); Manhattan, New York City, U.S.
- Resting place: Memorial Park Cemetery and Crematorium, Skokie, Illinois
- Other name: Harold Neberroth
- Occupation: Actor
- Years active: 1936–1951
- Spouses: Priscilla Lawson (m. 1937; div. 1940) Ilona Massey (m. 1941; div. 1942) Sandra Lucas aka Alexandra Crowell (m. 1946; div. 1949) Betty Dodero (m. 1950; div. 1951)

Alan Curtis (born Harry David Ueberroth; July 24, 1909 – February 2, 1953) was an American film actor who appeared in over 50 films.

== Early life and career ==
Curtis was born Harry David Ueberroth in Chicago to Christopher Henry Ueberroth and his wife, Ottilie. He began his career as a model before becoming an actor, appearing in local newspaper ads. His looks did not go unnoticed in Hollywood and he began appearing in films in the late 1930s.

Curtis made his screen debut in Winterset (1936). His film activities included a Technicolor appearance in the Alice Faye-Don Ameche film Hollywood Cavalcade (1939) and a memorable role in High Sierra (1941). He was one of the romantic leads in Abbott and Costello's first hit film Buck Privates (1941) and played composer Franz Schubert in The Great Awakening (1941).

His chance for leading-man stardom came when he replaced the unwilling John Garfield in the production Flesh and Fantasy (1943). Curtis played a ruthless killer opposite Gloria Jean. However, the studio cut their performances from the final film version. The footage was later expanded into a B-picture melodrama Destiny (1944). He also portrayed the man framed for murder in Phantom Lady (1944) and the detective Philo Vance. Curtis starred in over two dozen movies.

== Personal life ==
Curtis was married to:

- Actress Priscilla Lawson,
- Model Sandra Lucas: born Alexandra Beryl Crowell in 1917, she was married 1939 to 1945 to musician Lyn Lucas (brother of Clyde Lucas). Curtis and Lucas married in Las Vegas, Nevada, on 8 February 1946: the couple were still married in May 1949 divorcing prior to Curtis' fourth marriage in November 1950. Lucas, identified as socialite Alexandra Crowell Curtis, wed actor John Payne on 27 September 1953, becoming his widow 6 December 1989.
- Elizabeth Sundmark Dodero (died 1959), a onetime showgirl, former wife of Argentine millionaire Alberto Dodero, and a close friend of Eva Peron. They married in New York City on November 21, 1950, and divorced the following year. She died in 1959, after marrying, in 1952, saloon singer Hugh Shannon.

== Death ==
Curtis had a routine kidney operation on January 28, 1953, at Saint Clare's Hospital in Manhattan. Several hours after the surgery, as he sipped some tea, he "died" for four minutes when his heart failed. He was revived and seemed to be improving but died five days later, aged 43. He is buried in the Ueberroth family plot in Memorial Park Cemetery in Skokie, Illinois.

== Recognition ==
Curtis has a star at 7021 Hollywood Boulevard in the Motion Picture section of the Hollywood Walk of Fame. It was dedicated on February 8, 1960.

== Filmography ==
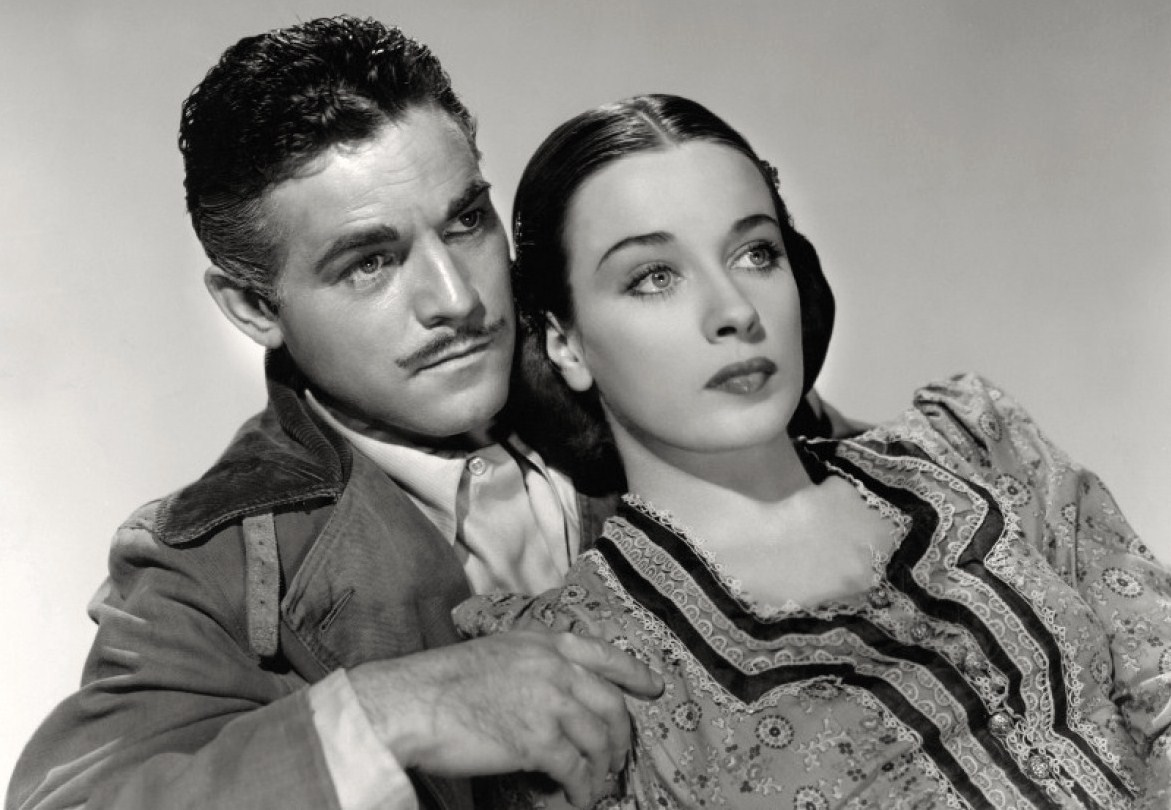
Alan Curtis and Patricia Morison in Hitler's Madman (1943).

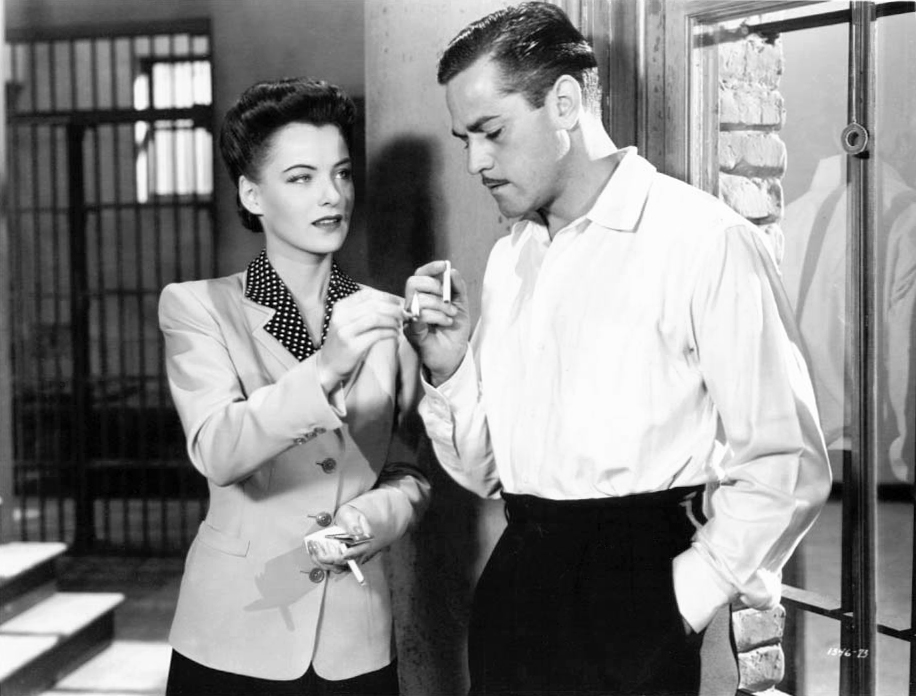
Curtis and Ella Raines in Phantom Lady (1944)

Year	Title	Role	Notes
1936	The Witness Chair	Reporter in Courtroom	Uncredited
1936	Undersea Kingdom	Guardsman	Uncredited
1936	The Last Outlaw	Convertible Driver	Uncredited
1936	Swing Time	Minor Role	Uncredited
1936	Walking on Air	Fred Randolph	
1936	Don't Turn 'Em Loose	Wedding Attendant with Telegram	Uncredited
1936	Without Orders	Co-Pilot	Uncredited
1936	One Live Ghost	Alan	Short, Uncredited
1936	Smartest Girl in Town	Male Model Who Escorts Cookie	Uncredited
1936	Winterset	Sailor	Uncredited
1937	Don't Tell the Wife	Second Stockbroker at Shaw & Allen	Uncredited
1937	Sea Devils	Radio Operator, Yacht Mona	Uncredited
1937	China Passage	Ship's Officer	Uncredited
1937	The Woman I Love		Uncredited
1937	Between Two Women	Interne	Uncredited
1937	Bad Guy	Prison Switchboard Operator	Uncredited
1937	The Firefly	French Soldier	Uncredited
1937	Mannequin	Eddie Miller	
1938	Yellow Jack	Brinkerhof	
1938	The Shopworn Angel	Thin Lips	
1938	The Duke of West Point	Cadet Strong	
1939	Burn'Em Up O'Connor	Jose 'Rocks' Rivera	
1939	Sergeant Madden	Dennis Madden	
1939	Good Girls Go to Paris	Tom Brand	
1939	Hollywood Cavalcade	Nicky Hayden	
1940	Four Sons	Karl	
1941	High Sierra	'Babe'	
1941	Come Live with Me	Bit Part	Uncredited
1941	Buck Privates	Bob Martin	
1941	Blood and Sand	Minor Role	(scenes deleted)
1941	The Great Awakening	Franz Schubert	
1941	We Go Fast	Bob Brandon	
1942	Remember Pearl Harbor	Bruce Gordon	
1943	Hitler's Madman	Karel Vavra	
1943	Two Tickets to London	First Mate Dan Driscoll	
1943	Crazy House	Himself	
1943	'Gung Ho!': The Story of Carlson's Makin Island Raiders	John Harbison	
1944	Phantom Lady	Scott Henderson	
1944	Follow the Boys	Himself	Uncredited
1944	The Invisible Man's Revenge	Mark Foster	
1944	Destiny	Cliff Banks	
1945	Frisco Sal	Rio Jordan aka John Warren	
1945	See My Lawyer	Charlie Rodman	
1945	The Naughty Nineties	Mr. Crawford	
1945	Shady Lady	Marty Martin	
1945	The Daltons Ride Again	Emmett Dalton	
1946	Inside Job	Eddie Norton aka Eddie Mitchell	
1946	Flight to Nowhere	Hobe Carrington	
1946	Renegade Girl	Capt. Fred Raymond	
1947	Philo Vance's Gamble	Philo Vance	
1947	Philo Vance's Secret Mission	Philo Vance	
1948	The Enchanted Valley	Johnny Nelson	
1949	Apache Chief	Young Eagle	
1949	The Masked Pirate	Commodore Van Diel	
1951	Amore e sangue	Paolo Giacomo	(final film role)
