= The Runaround (1946 film) =

1946 film

- Film poster
- Directed by: Charles Lamont
- Written by: Sam Hellman
- Story by: Walter Wise; Arthur T. Horman
- Produced by: Joseph Gershenson
- Starring: Rod Cameron; Ella Raines; Broderick Crawford; Frank McHugh
- Cinematography: George Robinson
- Edited by: Ted J. Kent
- Music by: Frank Skinner
- Color process: Black-and-white
- Production company: Universal Pictures
- Distributed by: Universal Pictures; General Film Distributors (UK)
- Release date: 4 June 1946 (US)
- Running time: 86 minutes
- Country: United States
- Language: English

The Runaround is a 1946 American comedy mystery film directed by Charles Lamont and starring Rod Cameron, Ella Raines, Broderick Crawford, and Frank McHugh. The film is also known as Deadly Enemies. It was produced and distributed by Universal Pictures and shot at the studio's Universal City.

== Plot ==
Two professional private detectives (Rod Cameron and Broderick Crawford) leave their agency to be independently hired by a wealthy man who desperately wants to find his eloping daughter (Ella Raines).

== Cast ==
- Rod Cameron as Eddie Kildane
- Ella Raines as Penelope Hampton
- Broderick Crawford as Louis Prentice
- Frank McHugh as Wally Quayle
- Samuel S. Hinds as Norman Hampton
- George Cleveland as Feenan
- Joe Sawyer as Hutchins
- Nana Bryant as Mrs. Hampton
- Charles Coleman as Butler
- Jack Overman as Cusack
