= Foreign Correspondent (film) =

1940 film by Alfred Hitchcock

- Theatrical release poster
- Directed by: Alfred Hitchcock
- Written by: James Hilton (dialogue); Robert Benchley (dialogue)
- Screenplay by: Charles Bennett; Joan Harrison
- Based on: Personal History: Youth and Revolution: the Story of One Person's Relationship to Living History; 1935 autobiographical book by Vincent Sheean
- Produced by: Walter Wanger
- Starring: Joel McCrea; Laraine Day; Herbert Marshall; George Sanders; Albert Bassermann; Robert Benchley
- Cinematography: Rudolph Maté, A.S.C.
- Edited by: Dorothy Spencer
- Music by: Alfred Newman
- Production company: Walter Wanger Productions
- Distributed by: United Artists
- Release date: August 16, 1940 (U.S.)
- Running time: 120 minutes
- Country: United States
- Language: English
- Budget: $1,484,167
- Box office: $1,598,435

Foreign Correspondent is a 1940 American black-and-white spy thriller film directed by Alfred Hitchcock. It tells the story of an American reporter based in Britain who tries to expose enemy spies involved in a fictional continent-wide conspiracy in the prelude to World War II. It stars Joel McCrea and features 19-year-old Laraine Day, Herbert Marshall, George Sanders, Albert Bassermann, and Robert Benchley, along with Edmund Gwenn.

Foreign Correspondent was Hitchcock's second Hollywood production after leaving the United Kingdom in 1939 (the first was Rebecca) and had an unusually large number of writers: Robert Benchley, Charles Bennett, Harold Clurman, Joan Harrison, Ben Hecht, James Hilton, John Howard Lawson, John Lee Mahin, Richard Maibaum, and Budd Schulberg, with Bennett, Harrison, Hilton and Benchley the only writers credited in the finished film. It was based on Vincent Sheean's political memoir Personal History (1935), the rights to which were purchased by producer Walter Wanger for $10,000.

The film was one of two Hitchcock films nominated for the Academy Award for Best Picture in 1940, the other being Rebecca, which went on to win the award. Foreign Correspondent was nominated for six Academy Awards, including one for Albert Bassermann for Best Supporting Actor, but did not win any.

== Plot ==
Trailer for Foreign Correspondent

In mid-August 1939, just before the outbreak of World War II, the editor of the New York Morning Globe, Mr. Powers, sends crime reporter John Jones, using the pen name "Huntley Haverstock", to Europe to report on conditions there.

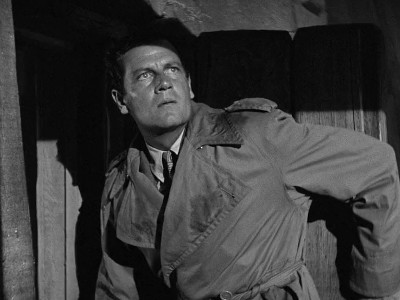
Joel McCrea as "John Jones", foreign correspondent

Jones's first assignment is to interview a Dutch diplomat named Van Meer, at a luncheon.

Jones/Haverstock shares a cab with Van Meer on the way to the luncheon. He peppers him with questions about the impending war, but Van Meer evades answering. Once at the event, Jones becomes smitten with Carol who has some uncertain role at the meeting. He invites her to sit at his table saying none of the reporters will listen to the speeches. A charming host, Stephen Fisher, the leader of the Universal Peace Party, makes the announcement that their keynote speaker, Van Meer, has taken ill and won't appear. In his stead, the host has his daughter, Carol, speak. Jones realizes he has inadvertently insulted the woman he now adores.

The newspaper editor, Powers, sends Jones on to Amsterdam to cover Van Meer's next appearance, at a conference of the Universal Peace Party. When Jones stops to greet Van Meer outside the conference hall, Van Meer seems to be in some kind of hypnotic state and does not recognize him. Suddenly, an eager photographer moves to take a photo of the Dutch diplomat – actually concealing a gun near the camera. He assassinates Van Meer. Jones runs after the shooter and ends up encountering Carol and a reporter friend of hers, Scott ffolliott. They give chase in his car. Outside the city, they seem to lose sight of the car they have been following, but Jones suspects that the assassin is hiding in a windmill.

While Carol and ffolliott go for the police, Jones searches the windmill and finds Van Meer alive, but heavily drugged. All Van Meer can manage to convey is that the man shot in front of witnesses earlier was an imposter. Jones narrowly escapes the windmill to tell the police that Van Meer is alive. When they all return to the scene with authorities, Van Meer and his kidnappers are gone. Later, back at Jones's hotel room in Amsterdam, two spies posing as police officers arrive to kidnap him. When he suspects who they really are, he escapes out of his hotel bathroom window. He runs into Carol again.

Jones and Carol board a British ship to England. Amidst a furious storm, Jones proposes marriage to her, and she accepts. In England, they go to Carol's father's house, where Jones sees Krug, whom he recognizes from the windmill as the operative running the assassination and kidnapping. Fisher and Krug realize Jones knows too much, and Krug convinces Fisher that he must be killed. Fisher tells Jones he is in danger and offers a bodyguard to protect him. The bodyguard, Rowley, takes Jones to the top of Westminster Cathedral tower ostensibly to ditch anyone following them and to show Jones the view. Suddenly, the bodyguard tries to shove Jones off the tower, going over the side to his own death instead.

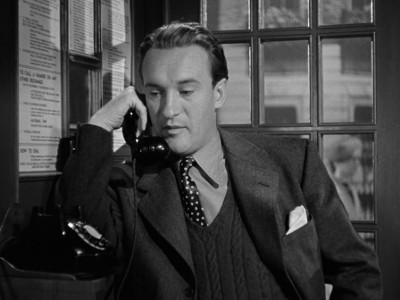
George Sanders as "ffolliott"

Jones and ffolliott are convinced that Fisher is a traitor, so they come up with a plan: Jones will take Carol to Cambridge, and ffolliott will pretend she has been kidnapped, in order to force Fisher to divulge Van Meer's location. Carol agrees to go, thinking that the purpose of their trip is to protect Jones by getting him out of London. When she overhears Jones booking two adjoining rooms at an inn, she believes that Jones has tricked her into leaving London for a premarital sexual encounter. She returns home alone and earlier than ffolliott expected, foiling his attempt to extract Van Meer's location from her father. ffolliott then trails Fisher to a closed hotel where Van Meer is being held prisoner. He is captured at gunpoint and brought into the room where the spy ring is holding a drugged Van Meer, torturing him with bright lights and loud jazz music. Fisher fails to persuade Van Meer to reveal the details of a secret clause in a treaty, Clause 27 (the movie's MacGuffin). Fisher then has Van Meer physically tortured until he begins to recite the clause, which would be triggered if Germany goes to war. ffolliot starts to fight Fisher's thugs to interrupt Van Meer and then escapes. Jones and a fellow reporter arrive, and the three rescue Van Meer. Fisher flees. Van Meer is taken to a nearby hospital, where he slowly regains consciousness.

Britain and France declare war on Germany. Jones and ffolliott follow the Fishers onto a Short S.30 Empire flying boat to America. When Fisher intercepts a telegram intended for ffolliott, telling him that Van Meer has recovered and identified Fisher as his kidnapper, Fisher realizes he will soon be captured and returned to England. He confesses his treasonous behavior to Carol, who already suspects the truth but promises to stand by him. Jones pleads with Carol to rekindle their affair. Seconds later, the aircraft is shelled by a German destroyer and crashes into the ocean. The survivors perch on the floating wing of the downed aircraft. Realizing that the wing cannot support everyone, Fisher slips into the ocean to drown, dying for his cause while also sacrificing himself so the rest will survive.

An American ship rescues the survivors. The captain refuses to allow the reporters to file their stories using the ship's communications, citing American neutrality in the war. Still, Jones, ffolliott, and Carol surreptitiously communicate the story by radio-telephone to Mr. Powers. Jones returns to England and, with Carol at his side, becomes a successful war correspondent. During a live radio broadcast, he describes London being bombed, urging Americans to "keep those lights burning" as they go dark in the studio.

== Cast ==
- Joel McCrea as John Jones
- Laraine Day as Carol Fisher
- Herbert Marshall as Stephen Fisher
- George Sanders as Scott Ffolliott [sic]
- Albert Bassermann as Van Meer (and as Van Meer's body double)
- Robert Benchley as Stebbins
- Edmund Gwenn as Rowley
- Eduardo Ciannelli as Mr. Krug
- Harry Davenport as Mr. Powers
- Martin Kosleck as Tramp
- Frances Carson as Mrs. Sprague
- Ian Wolfe as Stiles
- Charles Wagenheim as Assassin
- Edward Conrad as Latvian
- Charles Halton as Bradley
- Barbara Pepper as Dorine
- Emory Parnell as "Mohican" Captain
- Roy Gordon as Mr. Brood
- Gertrude Hoffman as Mrs. Benson
- Martin Lamont as Captain
- Barry Bernard as Steward
- Holmes Herbert as Asst. Commissioner
- Leonard Mudie as McKenna
- John Burton as English Announcer

Uncredited (in order of appearance)

- Crauford Kent as Toastmaster
- Jane Novak as Miss Benson
- Louis Borell as Captain Lanson
- Eily Malyon as English cashier
- E. E. Clive as Mr. Naismith
- Alexander Granach as Valet
- Jack Rice as Donald
- Hilda Plowright as Miss Pimm
- James Finlayson as Dutch peasant
- Joan Leslie as John Jones' sister
- Ernie Stanton as man at table

Alfred Hitchcock can be seen when Joel McCrea first spots Van Meer on the street in London; Hitchcock walks past reading a newspaper. Albert Bassermann, who plays Van Meer, was German and did not speak English, so he had to learn all his lines phonetically. Likewise, one supposedly Dutch girl in the film speaks Dutch phonetically, though less convincingly.

== Production ==
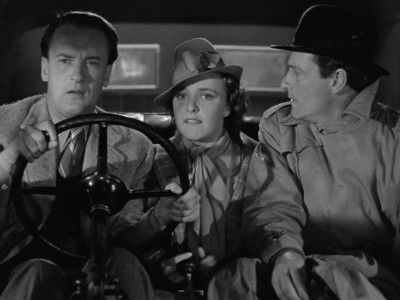
George Sanders, Laraine Day and Joel McCrea in pursuit of an assassin

Producer Walter Wanger bought the rights to journalist Vincent Sheean's memoir Personal History in 1935, but after several adaptations proved unsatisfactory, Wanger allowed the story to stray significantly from the book. It took numerous writers and five years before Wanger had a script he was satisfied with, by which time Hitchcock was in the United States under contract with David O. Selznick and available to direct this film on a loan-out. Hitchcock, who did not enjoy working under the usual close scrutiny of Selznick, originally wanted Gary Cooper and Joan Fontaine for the lead roles, but Cooper was not interested in doing a thriller at the time, and Selznick would not loan out Fontaine. Later, Cooper admitted to Hitchcock that he had made a mistake in turning down the film.

Working titles for the film, which began production on March 18, 1940, and initially finished on June 5, were Personal History and Imposter. Shooting took place at the Samuel Goldwyn Studio in West Hollywood, and on location around Los Angeles and Long Beach.

After the film wrapped, Hitchcock visited his native England, and returned to Los Angeles on July 3, to report that the Germans were expected to begin bombing London at any time. To accommodate this, Ben Hecht was called in to write the epilogue of the film, the scene in the radio station, which replaced the original end sequence in which two of the characters discussed the events of the film on a transatlantic seaplane trip. The new ending was filmed on July 5, presciently foreshadowing the celebrated radio broadcasts of Edward R. Murrow.

Although many critics and film historians claim that neither Germany nor Hitler is named specifically in the film, both the man and the nation are indeed mentioned, including a scene where the name Germany is spelled out in the headline of a newspaper being hawked in the street and, while being given his assignment, Joel McCrea suggests an interview with Hitler, to get his views on the possibility of war. A fictional nation is mentioned numerous times however, possibly indicating that it was briefly considered as a potential proxy aggressor European country rather than an actual Axis nation.

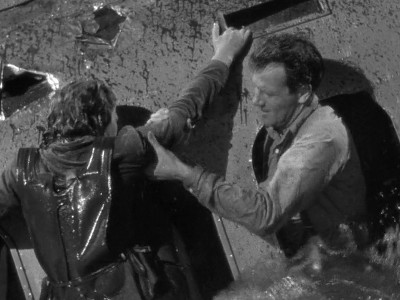
The aircraft crash

One of the sequences in the film that continues to have a strong effect on viewers is the mid-ocean crash of the flying boat after it is shot down by a German destroyer; the sequence was designed by William Cameron Menzies. In 1972, in an interview with Dick Cavett, Hitchcock discussed some details of how the scene was created. Footage taken from a stunt aircraft diving over the ocean was rear-projected on rice paper in front of the cockpit set, while behind the rice paper were two chutes connected to large water tanks. The chutes were aimed at the windshield of the cockpit so that water would break through the rice paper at the right moment, simulating the crash of the aircraft into the ocean. However, during the crash sequence, studio lights can briefly be seen.

Hitchcock's eccentric marriage proposal to his wife Alma was written for this film, for the scene when Jones proposes to Carol.

== Reception ==
Foreign Correspondent opened on August 16, 1940, in the United States and on October 11 of that year in the United Kingdom. The film, which ends with London being bombed, opened in the United States at the dawn of the Battle of Britain, just three days after the Luftwaffe began bombing British coastal airfields in the early Adlerangriff phase of the Battle of Britain, and a week before Germany began bombing London on August 24.

=== Box office ===
Foreign Correspondent did well at the box office, but its high cost meant it incurred a loss of $369,973. According to Kinematograph Weekly it was the second most popular film of 1940 in Britain (the first being Rebecca). It earned £118,519 in the UK.

=== Critical ===
It was generally praised by the critics, although some saw it as a glorified B movie. It also attracted attention from at least one professional propagandist, Nazi Propaganda Minister Joseph Goebbels, who called Foreign Correspondent "a masterpiece of propaganda, a first-class production which no doubt will make a certain impression upon the broad masses of the people in enemy countries".

On the review aggregator website Rotten Tomatoes, Foreign Correspondent has an approval rating of 96% based on 45 reviews, with an average score of 8.1/10. The site's critical consensus reads: "Alfred Hitchcock's Foreign Correspondent features a winning combination of international intrigue, comic relief, and some of the legendary director's most memorable set pieces." On Metacritic, which assigns a weighted average rating to reviews, the film has a score of 89 out of 100 based on 18 critic reviews, indicating "universal acclaim". In his 2012 review, Saptarshi Ray of The Guardian wrote of Foreign Correspondent: "a breathless yarn with the most serious of intents that soars well beyond mediocrity but just below genius, yet remains a film that should be included on the master of suspense's top table."

== Awards and honors ==
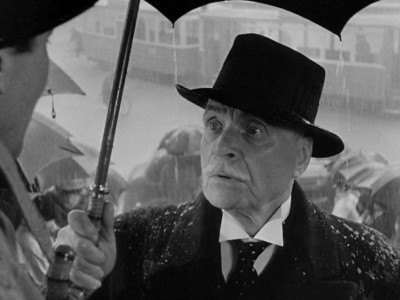
Albert Basserman (here as the Van Meer doppelgänger) was nominated for Best Actor in a Supporting Role.

In 1941, Foreign Correspondent was nominated for six Academy Awards, but did not win any.

Award	Category	Nominee(s)	Result	Notes
Academy Awards	Best Motion Picture	Walter Wanger	Nominated	
Academy Awards	Best Supporting Actor	Albert Bassermann	Nominated	
Academy Awards	Best Original Screenplay	Charles Bennett, Joan Harrison	Nominated	
Academy Awards	Best Cinematography	Rudolph Maté	Nominated	
Academy Awards	Best Art Direction	Alexander Golitzen	Nominated	
Academy Awards	Best Visual Effects	Paul Eagler (photographic), Thomas T. Moulton (sound)	Nominated	
National Board of Review	Best Picture		Nominated	

Foreign Correspondent was named one of the 10 Best Films of 1940 by Film Daily.

== Adaptations ==
Foreign Correspondent was adapted to the radio program Academy Award Theater on July 24, 1946, with Joseph Cotten starring.
