= Time Out of Mind (1947 film) =

1947 film by Robert Siodmak

- film poster
- Directed by: Robert Siodmak
- Screenplay by: Abem Finkel; Arnold Lippschitz
- Based on: Time Out of Mind by Rachel Field
- Produced by: Robert Siodmak
- Starring: Phyllis Calvert; Robert Hutton; Ella Raines
- Cinematography: Maury Gertsman
- Edited by: Ted J. Kent
- Music by: Miklós Rózsa; Mario Castelnuovo-Tedesco
- Color process: Black and white
- Production company: Universal Pictures
- Distributed by: Universal Pictures
- Release date: May 3, 1947
- Running time: 88 minutes
- Country: United States
- Language: English
- Budget: $1,674,500

Time Out of Mind is a 1947 American film noir drama film directed by Robert Siodmak and starring Phyllis Calvert, Robert Hutton and Ella Raines. Though it was made by Universal Pictures on a large budget of $1,674,500, the film was not a commercial success. The British actress Calvert was a major star in Britain and other countries for her roles in the Gainsborough melodramas.

== Plot ==
The son of a wealthy Maine family shocks his relatives by announcing he wants to pursue a career in music.

== Cast ==
- Phyllis Calvert as Kate Fernald
- Robert Hutton as Christopher Fortune
- Ella Raines as Clarissa 'Rissa' Fortune
- Eddie Albert as Jake Bullard
- Leo G. Carroll as Capt. Fortune
- Helena Carter as Dora Drake
- John Abbott as Max Leiberman
- Henry Stephenson as Wellington Drake
- Olive Blakeney as Mrs. Fernald
- Harry Shannon as Capt. Rogers
- Janet Shaw as Penny
- Emil Rameau as Alfred Stern
- Samuel S. Hinds as Dr. Weber
- Lilian Fontaine as Aunt Melinda
- Houseley Stevenson as George
- Maudie Prickett as Annie

== Production ==
=== Novel ===
The film was based on a novel by Rachel Field which was published in 1935. The New York Times said it "comes to life". The book became a best seller.

=== Development ===
Film rights were bought by Universal who in July 1936 announced a film version would start the following month under the direction of James Whale with Jane Wyatt to play Kate. Field came out to Hollywood to consult on the script.

The film ended up not being made for a number of years however two very successful movies were filmed of Field novels, All This and Heaven Too and And Now Tomorrow which revived Universal's interest.

In April 1945 Universal said Jane Murfin would produce. In July Ferde Grofe was signed to write the music.

In December 1945 J Arthur Rank of Britain announced he had signed a deal with Universal which would involve exchange of talent. Phyllis Calvert, one of his leading stars, was attached to Time Out of Mind.

In July 1946 Universal announced they would make the film that year, with Calvert to star and Robert Siodmak to direct. Calvert had been reluctant to make the movie but admired The Spiral Staircase and agreed to take the role after Siodmak became attached. Eddie Albert was announced as male star but he eventually dropped out and the male lead would be played by Ric Hutton, borrowed from Warner Bros.

Calvert arrived in Los Angeles in September. She says the studio threw her a big party then the producer told her that Siodmak was not going to be available and Frank Ryan would take over as director. The star protested and insisted Siodmak have the job. She says this led to a reputation for her being difficult.

Siodmak called it "a preposterous film... the story was absurd (who can sympathise with a main character who doesn't believe steam will ever supplant the sailing ship?)".

Siodmak says he was about to direct a film in Britain when presented with the script, but he refused to do it. "Apparently this put them on the spot" he later said claiming they "sent a deputation literally on its knees begging me to come back and direct it." His agent used this to negotiate "a mad contract whereby they trebled my salary for two years and gave me the right to veto the finished film's release if I didn't like it."

By October Siodmak was back on the movie. In November 1946, the week before filming was to start, Murfin left Universal. Siodmak took over as producer.

=== Shooting ===
Calvert found it an unpleasant experience, saying she felt like "an alien guinea pig". However while in the US she signed to Paramount for a five-film contract over five years.

Calvert says that Universal publicity manufactured a fictional pregnancy and a miscarriage for Calvert. "I hated America and they hated me!" she said.

Siodmak said he and cinematographer Maury Gertsman "had a great time loading the film with every crazy effect we could think of."

== Reception ==
Siodmak later said he did not have to use his veto "as they played the film for just one day in a tiny Park Avenue cinema then it disappeared forever."

The New York Times called the film "singularly empty".

Filmink said the film is best remembered today (if at all) for (a) being director Robert Siodmak's one dud in a series of classic films for Universal, and (b) an unsuccessful attempt to launch British star Phyllis Calvert in Hollywood."

== Bibliography ==
- Greco, Joseph. The File on Robert Siodmak in Hollywood, 1941–1951. Universal-Publishers, 1999.
