= Two Tickets to London =

1943 drama film directed by Edwin L. Marin

- Theatrical poster
- Directed by: Edwin L. Marin
- Written by: Tom Reed
- Produced by: Edwin L. Marin
- Starring: Michèle Morgan; Alan Curtis; C. Aubrey Smith
- Cinematography: Milton R. Krasner
- Edited by: Milton Carruth
- Music by: Frank Skinner
- Production company: Universal Pictures
- Distributed by: Universal Pictures
- Release date: June 18, 1943
- Running time: 78 minutes
- Country: United States
- Language: English

Two Tickets to London is a 1943 American drama film made by Universal Pictures, and directed by Edwin L. Marin. The screenplay was written by Tom Reed, based on story by Roy William Neill. The film stars Michèle Morgan and Alan Curtis.

== Plot ==
A U.S. naval officer is found guilty for treason, but escapes with the help of a café entertainer.

== Cast ==
- Michèle Morgan as Jeanne
- Alan Curtis as First Mate Dan Driscoll
- C. Aubrey Smith as Admiralty Detective Fairchild
- Barry Fitzgerald as Captain McCardle
- Dooley Wilson as Accordionist
- Robert Warwick as Ormsby
- Matthew Boulton as Brighton
- Tarquin Olivier as Roddy, Jeanne's son
- Oscar O'Shea as Mr. Tinkle
- Mary Gordon as Mrs. Tinkle
- Holmes Herbert as Kilgallen
- Mary Forbes as Dame Dunne Hartley
- Marie De Becker as Barmaid (uncredited)

== Critical reception ==
Allmovie wrote "Too expensive for a B"-picture, yet not quite an A, Two Tickets to London is an acceptable vehicle for French leading lady Michele Morgan and Universal contract player Alan Curtis;" while TV Guide called it "A standard programmer," and rated it 2/5 stars.
