= White Tie and Tails =

1946 film by Charles Barton

- Theatrical release poster
- Directed by: Charles Barton
- Screenplay by: Bertram Millhauser; Charles Beakon
- Based on: Double Murder by Rufus King
- Produced by: Howard Benedict
- Starring: Dan Duryea; Ella Raines; William Bendix; Frank Jenks
- Cinematography: Charles Van Enger
- Edited by: Ray Snyder
- Music by: Milton Rosen
- Color process: Black-and-white
- Production company: Universal Pictures
- Distributed by: Universal Pictures
- Release date: 30 August 1946
- Running time: 81 minutes
- Country: United States
- Language: English

White Tie and Tails is a 1946 American comedy drama film directed by Charles Barton and starring Dan Duryea, Ella Raines, William Bendix, and Frank Jenks. The film tagline is "Clothes Don't Make the Man ... a Gentleman!" The film is based on Rufus King's serial novel Double Murder published in Red Book Magazine and on Charles Beakon's play Dangerously Yours.

== Plot ==
In New York City, a head butler (Dan Duryea) of a wealthy house of the Latimers stays to look after the mansion while the owners' family leaves for a vacation in Florida. However, he is going to have his own vacation there in the mansion, playing a rich man. He meets a beautiful woman (Ella Raines) and promises her to bail out her sister's large gambling debts owed to a ruthless gangster (William Bendix). However, the butler soon finds himself in trouble as the gangster later reveals that the debts may be up to $100,000 and that he needs a pair of valuable paintings from the Latimers' house as a collateral for the butler's check.

== Cast ==
- Dan Duryea as Charles Dumont
- Ella Raines as Louise Bradford
- William Bendix as Larry Lundie
- Frank Jenks as George
- Richard Gaines as Archer
- Donald Curtis as Nate Romero
- Clarence Kolb as Mr. Arkwright
- Barbara Brown as Mrs. Latimer
- John Miljan as Mr. Latimer
- Samuel S. Hinds as Mr. Bradford
- Nita Hunter as Betty Latimer
- Scotty Beckett as Bill Latimer
- William Trenk as Emil
- Patricia Alphin as Cynthia Bradford
- Joan Shawlee as Virgie (as Joan Fulton)

== Production ==
The film was produced by Howard Benedict for Universal Pictures and filmed at Universal Studios in Universal City, California. The film was originally intended to be directed by William Seitner. The story was written by Charles Beakon (author of the play) and Rufus King (author of the novel).

== Distribution ==
The film was released by Universal Pictures under the title White Tie and Tails in the United States on August 30, 1946. The film was also re-released under the title The Swindlers.

=== Other distributions ===
- Sweden on January 27, 1947 (En skojare i frack)
- Finland on February 13, 1948 (Hovimestari järjestää kaiken)
- Portugal on May 27, 1949 (Cavalheiro Por Uma Noite)
- Brazil (Cavalheiro por uma Noite)
- Italy (Frac e cravatta bianca)
