= Ella Raines =

American actress (1920–1988)

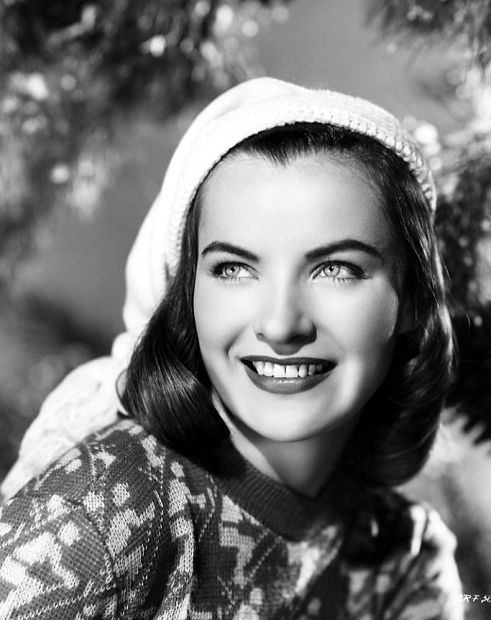
- Circa 1940
- Born: Ella Wallace Raubes; August 6, 1920; Snoqualmie Falls, Washington, U.S.
- Died: May 30, 1988 (aged 67); Sherman Oaks, California, U.S.
- Education: University of Washington
- Years active: 1943–1957, 1984
- Spouses: Kenneth Trout (m. 1942; div. 1945) Robin Olds (m. 1947; div. 1976)
- Children: 2

Ella Wallace Raines (born Ella Wallace Raubes; August 6, 1920 – May 30, 1988) was an American film and television actress active from the early 1940s through the mid-1950s. Described as "sultry" and "mysterious", the green-eyed star appeared frequently in crime pictures and film noir, but also in drama, comedy, Westerns, thrillers, and romance.

Among the leading men she starred with were John Wayne, Charles Laughton, William Powell, Randolph Scott, Franchot Tone, Brian Donlevy, George Raft, and Burt Lancaster. When film roles dwindled she turned to television. Her second marriage was to Robin Olds, a U.S. Air Force triple-ace fighter pilot and Commandant of Cadets of the United States Air Force Academy and they had 2 children.

Raines appeared as a pin-up girl in the June 2 and June 16, 1944, issues of the G.I. magazine Yank, and on the cover of Life magazine twice, in 1944 for her work in Phantom Lady, and in 1947 for Brute Force.

== Early life ==
Born August 6, 1920 in Snoqualmie Falls, Washington to logging engineer Ernest N. Raines and his wife Bird Zachary, Raines studied drama at the University of Washington where she was discovered by talent agent Charles K. Feldman. He informed his client and sometime business partner, director Howard Hawks who saw her appearing in a play at the university. She achieved stardom almost overnight in Hollywood when she was made the sole contract star of a $1-million new production company Hawks had formed in 1943 with actor Charles Boyer, B-H Productions. She made her film debut as the leading lady opposite Randolph Scott in Corvette K-225 (1943), which Hawks produced.

== Acting career ==
=== Film ===
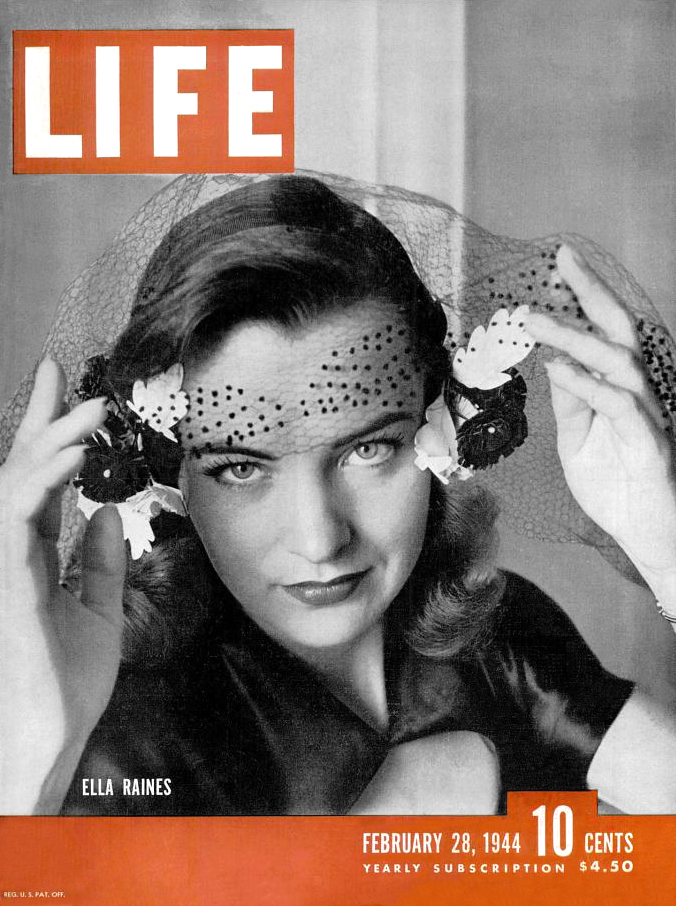
Raines on the cover of Life magazine (February 28, 1944)

Immediately following her debut in Corvette K-225, Raines was cast in the all-female war film Cry "Havoc" (also 1943). Hawks sold her contract to Universal Pictures where she first starred in the film noir Phantom Lady with Franchot Tone, directed by Robert Siodmak. She also starred in the Preston Sturges comedy Hail the Conquering Hero, and the John Wayne western Tall in the Saddle (all 1944).

Still in 1944 she appeared in the unusual Edwardian noir The Suspect opposite Charles Laughton. She then starred in two more films directed by Siodmak: the romantic suspense The Strange Affair of Uncle Harry (1945) with Geraldine Fitzgerald and George Sanders, and the noir Time Out of Mind (1947). Also in 1947, she starred in the thriller The Web (1947) with Edmond O'Brien, the prison drama Brute Force (1947) with Burt Lancaster and the comedy The Senator Was Indiscreet with William Powell.

In 1949 she starred opposite Brian Donlevy in the noirish Impact, then took the lead role originally intended for Jean Wallace in the noir A Dangerous Profession, as Wallace had made a suicide attempt following her divorce from Franchot Tone. None of her later pictures were as successful as her earlier movies and her film career began to decline.

Following some years in television, her final film role was starring as the female lead in a British-made thriller The Man in the Road in 1956. Apart from a single television appearance in the 1980s, she retired from acting altogether the following year.

=== Television ===
In 1954 and 1955 she starred in the television series Janet Dean, Registered Nurse. She also directed three episodes. She also appeared in such television series as Robert Montgomery Presents, Douglas Fairbanks, Jr., Presents, Lights Out, Pulitzer Prize Playhouse and The Christophers.

After a nearly three decade hiatus, Raines' final appearance as an actress was in a guest role in the crime drama series Matt Houston in 1984.

=== Theatre ===
She appeared on Broadway with Helen Hayes in The Wisteria Trees in 1955.

=== Teaching ===
She was a private tutor for actors and also taught at the University of Washington in the early 1980s.

== Personal life ==
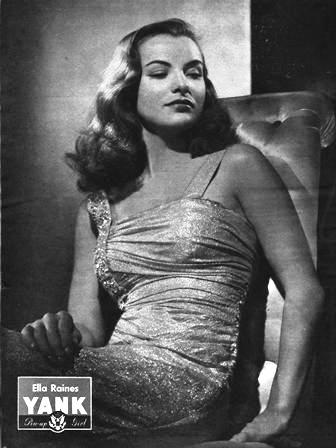
Pin-up photo of Raines for the Aug. 17, 1945 issue of Yank, the Army Weekly

On August 11, 1942, a few days after her graduation from the University of Washington, Raines married her high school sweetheart, United States Army Air Forces Major Kenneth William Trout. The couple divorced December 18, 1945.

On February 6, 1947, Raines married then double-ace World War II fighter pilot Robin Olds, who went on to become a triple-ace during the Vietnam War, was eventually promoted to United States Air Force brigadier general, and served as commandant of the United States Air Force Academy from 1967 to 1971. The couple had two daughters, Christina and Susan and she essentially retired to raise them. She also suffered two miscarriages and a stillbirth. They separated in 1975 and divorced in 1976.

Known for her traditional family values, Raines was quoted at the height of her Hollywood career extolling them: "I am naturally captivated with the rewards that Hollywood bestows on those who are successful. But I’m going to do my best to see that these [rewards] never disturb the essential values in my life—love of husband, family, home; the things that really count."

She died from throat cancer in Sherman Oaks, California on May 30, 1988, aged 67.

== Legacy ==
Raines has two stars on the Hollywood Walk of Fame, for her contribution to motion pictures at 7021 Hollywood Boulevard, and for television at 6600 Hollywood Boulevard.

== Filmography ==
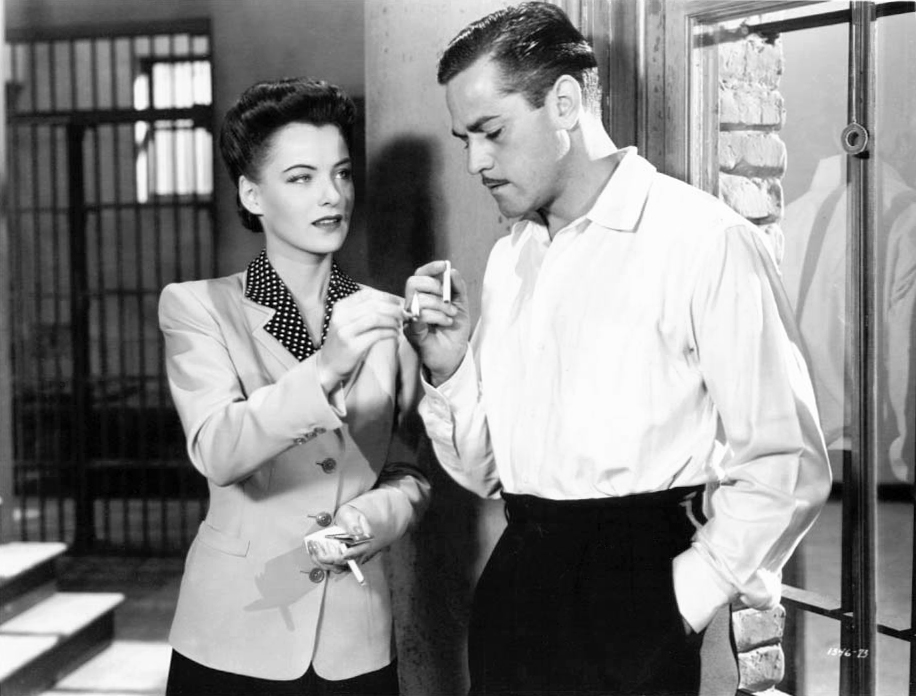
Raines and Alan Curtis in Phantom Lady (1944)

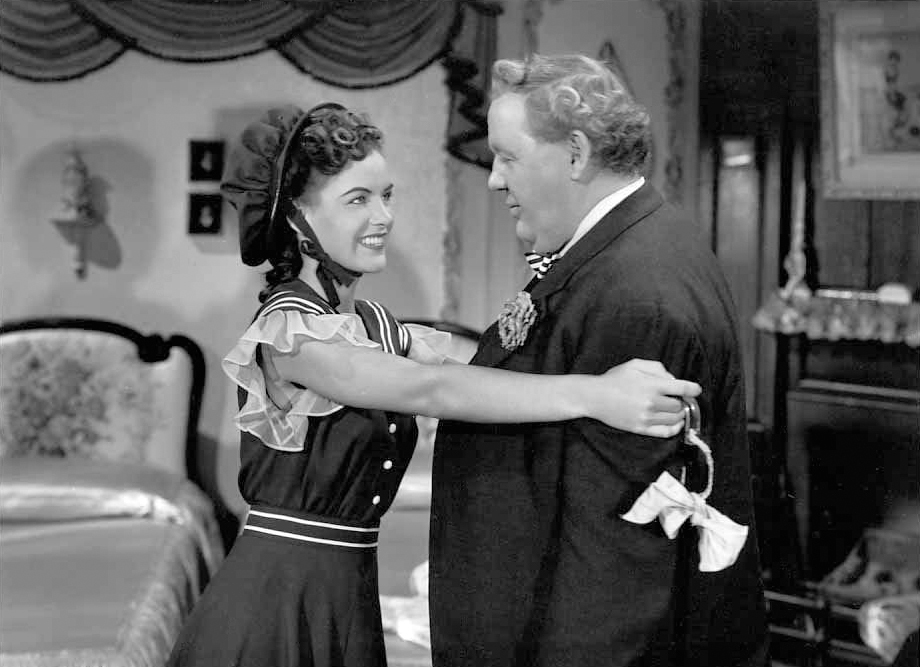
Raines and Charles Laughton in The Suspect (1944)

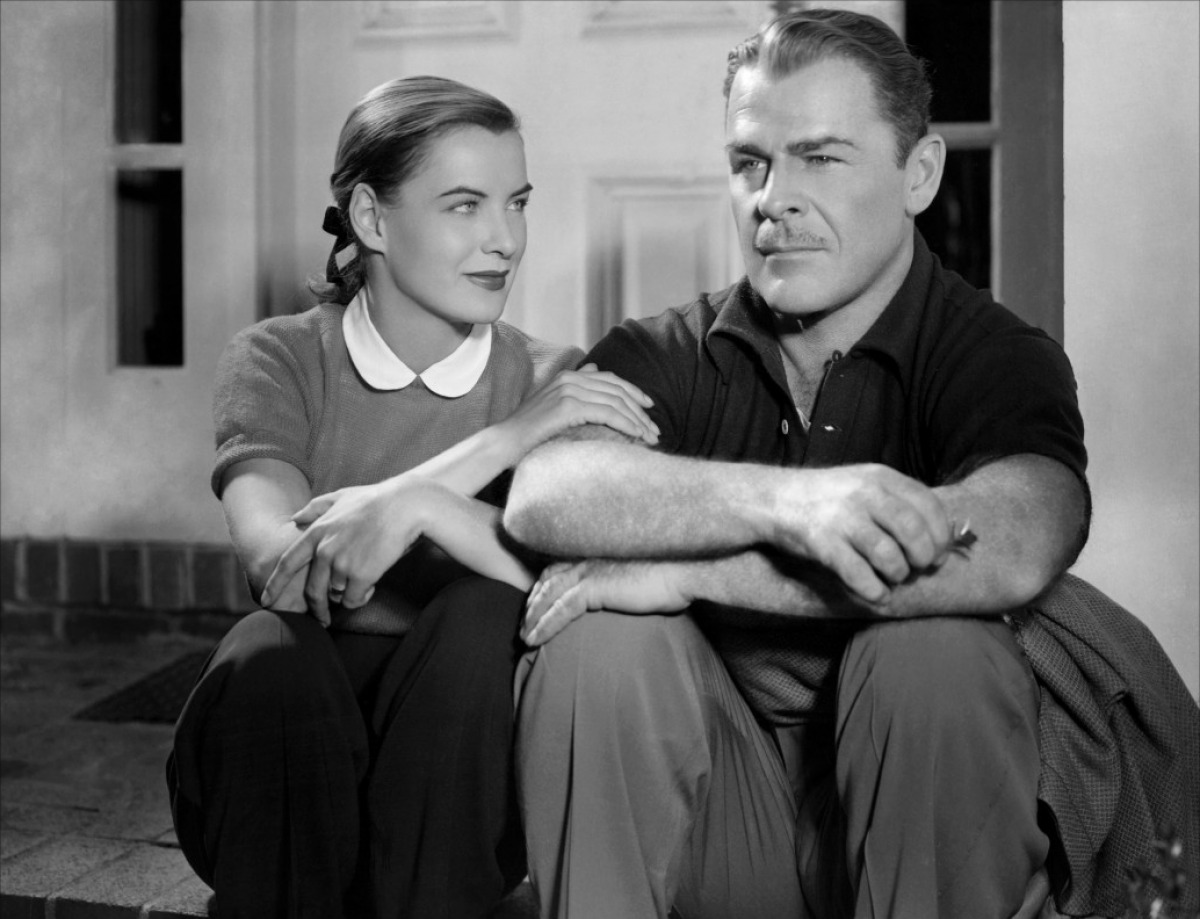
Raines and Brian Donlevy in Impact (1949)

Year	Title	Role	Notes
1943	Corvette K-225	Joyce Cartwright	
1943	Cry 'Havoc'	Connie	
1944	Phantom Lady	Carol Richman	
1944	Hail the Conquering Hero	Libby	
1944	Tall in the Saddle	Arleta 'Arly' Harolday	
1944	Enter Arsène Lupin	Stacie Kanares	
1944	The Suspect	Mary	
1945	The Strange Affair of Uncle Harry	Deborah Brown	
1946	The Runaround	Penelope 'Annabelle' Hampton	
1946	White Tie and Tails	Louise Bradford	
1947	Time Out of Mind	Clarissa 'Rissa' Fortune	
1947	The Web	Noel Faraday	
1947	Brute Force	Cora Lister	
1947	The Senator Was Indiscreet	Poppy McNaughton	
1949	The Walking Hills	Chris Jackson	
1949	Impact	Marsha Peters	
1949	A Dangerous Profession	Lucy Brackett	
1950	Singing Guns	Nan Morgan	
1950	The Second Face	Phyllis Holmes	
1951	Fighting Coast Guard	Louise Ryan	
1952	Ride the Man Down	Celia Evarts	
1956	The Man in the Road	Rhona Ellison	

== See also ==
- Pin-ups of Yank, the Army Weekly
