= The Web (film) =

1947 film by Michael Gordon

- Theatrical release poster
- Directed by: Michael Gordon
- Screenplay by: William Bowers; Bertram Millhauser
- Story by: Harry Kurnitz
- Produced by: Jerry Bresler
- Starring: Ella Raines; Edmond O'Brien; William Bendix; Vincent Price
- Cinematography: Irving Glassberg
- Edited by: Russell F. Schoengarth
- Music by: Hans J. Salter
- Color process: Black and white
- Production company: Universal International Pictures
- Distributed by: Universal Pictures
- Release date: May 25, 1947
- Running time: 87 minutes
- Country: United States
- Language: English

The Web is a 1947 American film noir crime film starring Edmond O'Brien, Ella Raines, William Bendix and Vincent Price,

== Plot ==
Leopold Kroner, formerly of Colby Enterprises, is released after five years in prison for embezzlement. Andrew Colby, claiming that Kroner has threatened him, hires lawyer Bob Regan as a personal bodyguard. That evening, Regan hears a gunshot from Colby's study and finds Kroner there, apparently trying to kill Colby. Regan kills Kroner when he turns around pointing a gun at him.

Regan believes Colby's explanation that Kroner had become delusional and threatening, until Regan's police buddy Damico lets on that he's suspicious that Regan murdered Kroner. Kroner's daughter Martha Kroner shows up at Regan's apartment and tries, but fails, to murder him. She reveals that Colby had invited Kroner to the house that night and Kroner was of sound mind. Regan investigates further, getting information about Kroner's embezzlement case from a reporter and Colby's secretary, Noel. Regan has a friend impersonate one of Colby's associates on the phone to deceive him into providing information about the embezzlement, unknowing that this associate is already long dead.

Colby uses this situation to his advantage to set a trap for Regan and Noel (whom he has decided has betrayed him). He innocently asks Noel to remove money from his safe, then after she leaves, he kills his associate Charles with a weapon having Regan's fingerprints. The two of them are framed for theft and murder, but Lt. Damico tricks Colby into thinking Charles is still alive. Since Charles would reveal all of Colby's actions, that night Colby tries to sneak down and strangle Charles, only to be caught red-handed.

== Cast ==
- Ella Raines as Noel Faraday
- Edmond O'Brien as Bob Regan
- William Bendix as Lt. Damico
- Vincent Price as Andrew Colby
- Maria Palmer as Martha Kroner
- John Abbott as Charles Murdock
- Fritz Leiber (Sr.) as Leopold Kroner
- Howland Chamberlain as James Nolan
- Tito Vuolo as Emilio Canepa
- Wilton Graff as District Attorney
- Robin Raymond as Newspaper Librarian
- Ethan Laidlaw as Plainclothesman (uncredited)

== Reception ==
=== Critical response ===
When the film was released The New York Times film critic gave it a negative review, writing, "Ella Raines and Edmond O'Brien, as the lawyer, play their stock roles with competence, and William Bendix plays the lieutenant with a suggestion of, shall we say, retarded intellectual attainment. But he's not nearly as dumb as he makes out and, on the other hand, The Web is not nearly as good as it might have been."

In 2011, film critic Dennis Schwartz gave the film a positive review, writing, "Top-of-the-line B film crime drama. A great cast digs into this film noir with relish. Director Michael Gordon (Pillow Talk/Texas Across the River/Boston Blackie Goes Hollywood) keeps things breezy and topped off with zesty mustard. Writers Bertram Millhauser and William Bowers keep the story by Harry Kurnitz free of any dull moments. The pic has the following things going for it: William Bendix is superb playing a smart cop against type, a sassy Ella Raines smoothly swinging her hips is good for the eyes and ears, a slimy Vincent Price as the sinister villain makes your blood boil in an entertaining way, and a rarely seen as slim Edmond O'Brien is oafishly prancing around as the good guy lawyer of the people and makes for a likeable hero."

== Home media ==
Kino Lorber released a region A Blu-ray edition of the film through their Kino Lorber Studio Classics label on July 13, 2021.
