= The Senator Was Indiscreet =

1947 film by George S. Kaufman

- Theatrical release poster
- Directed by: George S. Kaufman
- Screenplay by: Charles MacArthur
- Based on: The Senator Was Indiscreet; 1946 stories in Collier's by Edwin Lanham
- Produced by: Nunnally Johnson
- Starring: William Powell; Ella Raines; Arleen Whelan
- Cinematography: William C. Mellor (as William Mellor)
- Edited by: Sherman A. Rose
- Music by: Daniele Amfitheatrof
- Production company: Nunnally Johnson Productions
- Distributed by: Universal Pictures
- Release date: December 26, 1947 (New York City)
- Running time: 88 minutes
- Country: United States
- Language: English

The Senator Was Indiscreet, also known as Mr. Ashton Was Indiscreet, is a 1947 American comedy film, the only movie directed by playwright, theatrical director/producer, humorist, and drama critic George S. Kaufman. Produced by Universal Pictures it starred William Powell as a dim-witted U.S. senator who decides to run for president, with Ella Raines as a reporter interested in the detailed diary he has kept about all the political misdeeds of his colleagues. Powell won the New York Film Critics Circle Award for Best Actor for his performances in this film and in Life with Father.

== Plot ==
The inept, slow-witted U.S. Senator Melvin G. Ashton wants to run for President of the United States. His eager publicist, Lew Gibson, encourages him with various attention-gaining stunts, disappointing his girlfriend Poppy McNaughton, a reporter for a local newspaper. When Ashton arrives at his hotel in New York City, Gibson asks him to accept membership into the Cherokee tribe, purely for publicity. Ashton eagerly agrees.

Fred Houlihan, a political boss, asks Ashton to step down as a presidential candidate. Ashton refuses, but in a long speech publicly and consistently denies he is running for president. The stunning Valerie Shepherd arrives and decides to join the campaign. Lew becomes attracted to her.

Appalled by Ashton's baffling incompetence, Poppy breaks up with Lew. Articles about Ashton's road to the presidency are published in the newspapers. Houlihan again tries to persuade him not to run. However, Ashton blackmails Houlihan into silence, telling him he has kept a diary of scandalous party activity for the past thirty years. Ashton embarks on a cross-country tour to court voters, becomes a popular candidate, and returns to speak at Madison Square Garden in New York City.

Ashton discovers his diary is missing, and suspects the communist hotel room service clerk Karl has stolen it. However, Lew suspects the thief was Poppy. Ashton's former secretary, Robert Oakes, is soon found with the diary, but he insists someone else stole it before he got hold of it. Lew finds out that Valerie's beau Bill Fisher is Ashton's political enemy and has started a petition to investigate the senator in his home state. From various clues, Poppy deduces that Valerie stole the diary.

Aware that the explosive diary is missing, Houlihan again asks Ashton to step down, at which point Ashton agrees to do so if they find him another job. They offer to get him appointed commissioner of a professional sports league, a job that pays twice the salary of the President of the U.S.

Poppy manages to retrieve the diary from Valerie, but loses it to Lew, who tells Ashton the good news. Houlihan then tries to convince Ashton to get back into the race, but Ashton hesitates. Lew then decides that the truth should be revealed and gives the diary back to Poppy. When it is published, both Ashton and his bosses are forced to flee to a South Sea island, where Ashton soon becomes chief of the native population.

== Cast ==
- William Powell as Senator Melvin G. Ashton
- Ella Raines as Poppy McNaughton
- Peter Lind Hayes as Lew Gibson
- Arleen Whelan as Valerie Shepherd
- Ray Collins as Houlihan
- Allen Jenkins as Farrell
- Charles D. Brown as Dinty
- Hans Conried as Karl the Waiter
- Whit Bissell as Oakes
- Milton Parsons as Joe
- Francis Pierlot as Frank
- Oliver Blake as Indian
- Chief Thunder Cloud as Indian
- Chief Yowlachie as Indian
- Iron Eyes Cody as Indian
- Claire Carleton as Ingrid Stuyvesant

Myrna Loy, Powell's frequent screen co-star, has an uncredited cameo appearance as Ashton's wife.

== Critical reception ==
A contemporary review in The New York Times by film critic Bosley Crowther opined that "Mr. MacArthur, who wrote the irreverent script, keeps things snapping and cracking in clever and hilarious style. And Mr. Kaufman, the director [...] pictures and paces them likewise," additionally noting that "William Powell as the Senator does about everything that a competent actor of farce comedy could do to make him a joke." Variety reported that Kaufman "manifests pace and polish in a fast-moving bit of fluff," that Powell "does a fine job as the stuffy dimwit of a senator," and that the casting "is good down the line." Writing in AllMovie, critic Craig Butler described the film as having "quite a few [funny moments], some drawn from some decent wordplay and verbal sparring, others from the expert comic pomposity of William Powell, as well as a sterling supporting cast."

== Radio adaptation ==
On October 3, 1949, Screen Directors Playhouse presented The Senator Was Indiscreet on NBC radio. The 30-minute adaptation starred Powell and Peggy Dow.
