= Janet Dean, Registered Nurse =

American medical drama TV series

- Starring: Ella Raines
- Country of origin: United States
- Original language: English
- No. of seasons: 1
- No. of episodes: 39

Production
- Running time: 30 minutes

Original release
- Network: Syndication

Janet Dean, Registered Nurse is an American medical drama television series. It was released in February 1954, and it continued to be broadcast in reruns in the early 1960s. It was the first TV series in which the lead was a nurse. By October 1954, the show's title had been changed to The Ella Raines Show "following the lead of other packages that switched to the stars' names to help pull an audience for the package."

== Title character ==
Ella Raines left retirement to portray Dean, the only regular character on the series. Dean had varied assignments from week to week. Raines's portrayal "brought cool dignity to her character". Bill Dozier, a friend of Raines who became executive producer for the series, conceived the idea for the program. He and Raines decided to make Dean a member of the United States Air Force Nurse Corps Reserve, making her "subject to recall for temporary or extended service", thus providing opportunities for a variety of locations and situations. Raines "spent weeks at the source, gathering material, studying the life and the personnel" in order to prepare for portraying Dean.

== Episodes ==
Janet Dean differed from some medical TV shows by emphasizing interpersonal drama more than "obscure medical conditions". Dean believed that applied psychology could resolve many problems and often used personal counseling as much as she applied medical treatments. Hal Erickson wrote in his book, Syndicated Television: The First Forty Years, 1947-1987: "This group of stories about an R. N. who moved from job to job had its share of wounded hoodlums and gun-wielding dope fiends, but the best Janet Deans were emotional dramas concerning such subjects as child abuse, parental neglect mistreatment of the mentally disabled and the shutting out of the elderly — dramas usually dismissed by critics of the '50s as 'Women's Stories'."

Raines concluded each broadcast with a brief appearance that promoted nursing as a profession.

== Production ==
Janet Dean was produced by Cornwall Productions, of which Raines was president. Joan Harrison was the producer, and William Dozier was the executive producer. The directors were Peter Godfrey, Robert Aldrich, Robert Boyle, and James Nielson. Laurance Rockefeller financed production of the program.

Thirty-nine episodes were filmed at Marion Parsonet Studios in Long Island City. Additional visual content came from stock film footage and from film borrowed from the United States Air Force. Motion Pictures for Television (MPTV) distributed the show in an effort to make the company a quasi-network by adding new syndicated TV series to its library of feature films. Before the first episode was broadcast, Emerson Drug Company had been signed as a sponsor, promoting Bromo-Seltzer, and 26 stations in major markets had committed to carrying the program. Guild Films acquired the Janet Dean series from MPTV in 1956.

Royal Dell Manufacturing Company produced Janet Dean doll and nursing kits under license from Cornwall Productions in 1954. A 14-inch doll with nursing equipment sold for $9.95, and an 18-inch doll similarly equipped sold for $13.95. Each one came in a box that resembled a TV set.

== Guest stars ==
Actors who appeared on episodes of Janet Dean included Murray Matheson, Melville Cooper, Marcel Hillaire, Darren McGavin, Cloris Leachman, Hildy Parks, William Prince, Margaret Wycherly, Patty McCormack,Charles Nolte, Dorothy Peterson, Don Hanmer, Addison Richards, and Gerald O'Loughlin.

== Critical reception ==
Raines was named Best Actress Appearing Regularly in a Non-Network Dramatic Film Series in The Billboard's Second Annual TV Film Awards.

Media critic John Crosby described the series as "hardly very medical". He noted that "some impressive endorsement" from the American Nurses Association and the National League of Nursing preceded the series's debut, but he felt that Dean's activities such as fending off insurance adjusters, confronting witnesses in cases, and averting an attempted murder detracted from a medical focus.
