= The Great Awakening (film) =

1941 film

- Spanish theatrical poster
- Directed by: Reinhold Schünzel
- Written by: Howard Estabrook; Nicholas Joy
- Produced by: Douglas MacLean; William Sekely; Alexander Korda (uncredited)
- Starring: Alan Curtis; Ilona Massey; Billy Gilbert; Binnie Barnes; Sig Arno
- Edited by: James Smith
- Production company: Gloria Pictures
- Distributed by: United Artists
- Release date: September 10, 1941
- Running time: 90 minutes
- Country: United States
- Language: English
- Budget: $600,000

The Great Awakening is a 1941 American historical musical drama film starring Alan Curtis, Ilona Massey, and Billy Gilbert. Directed by Reinhold Schünzel, the film was produced by Gloria Pictures Corporation, and released by United Artists. Miklós Rózsa was responsible for the musical direction, though he later expunged the title from his filmography, because he considered it a travesty of the great composer's life story.

The film is a biopic covering part of the life of Austrian composer Franz Schubert flees from Vienna. It is sometimes known by the alternative titles New Wine (original title), One Romantic Night (USA reissue title) or Schubert, the Melody Master, was the last directed by Schünzel who was an exile from Nazi Germany.

== Plot ==
Austrian composer Franz Schubert flees from Vienna to avoid conscription, ending up in Hungary where he falls in love.

== Cast ==
- Alan Curtis as Franz Schubert
- Ilona Massey as Anna
- Billy Gilbert as Poldi
- Binnie Barnes as Countess Carolinda
- Sig Arno as Maestro Frascini
- Barnett Parker as Duke
- Albert Bassermann as Ludwig van Beethoven
- Kenneth Farrell as Young Man
- Ann Stewart as Young Woman
- Gilbert Emery as School Principal
- George O'Hanlon as Peppi
- Forrest Tucker as Moritz
- Maynard Holmes as Wilhelm
- Marion Martin as Mitzi, tavern wench
- Paul Sutton as Farm Foreman
- Sterling Holloway as Otto, the bookkeeper
- John Qualen as Hasslinger's Clerk
- Richard Carle as Karl Hasslinger

== Bibliography ==
- Bock, Hans-Michael; Bergfelder, Tim, eds. (2009). The Concise Cinegraph: Encyclopaedia of German Cinema. New York: Berghahn Books. ISBN 978-1-57181-655-9.
- Langman, Larry (2000). Destination Hollywood: The Influence of Europeans on American Filmmaking. Jefferson, NC: McFarland. ISBN 978-0-7864-0681-4.
