= John Abbott (actor) =

English actor (1905–1996)

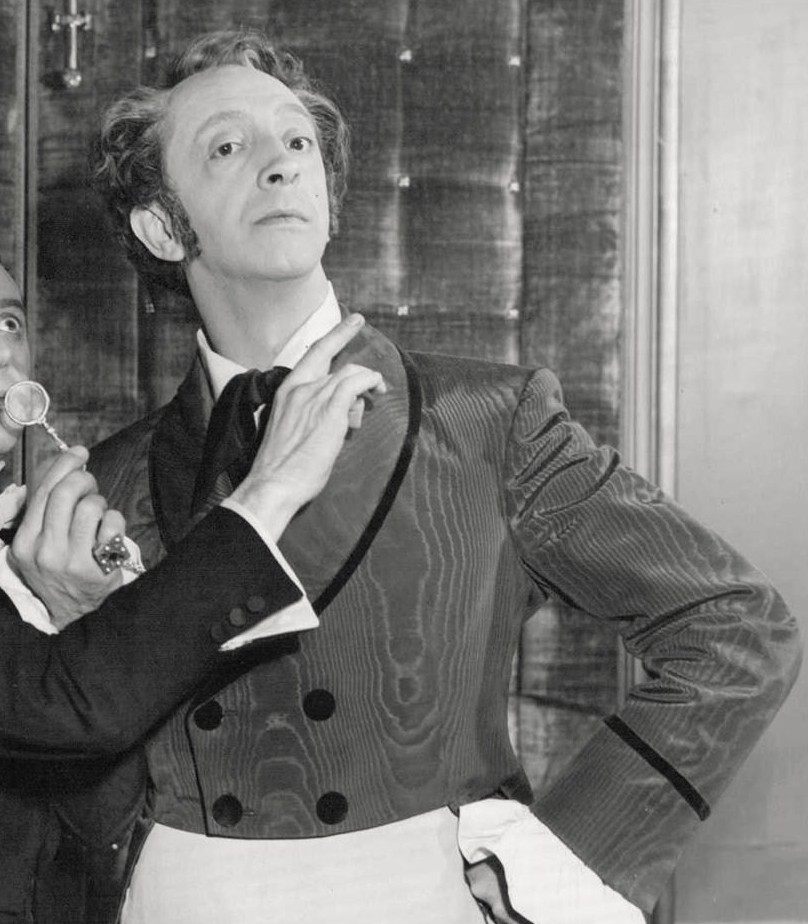
- Abbott in The Woman in White (1948)
- Born: John Albert Chamberlain Kefford; 5 June 1905; Stepney, London, England
- Died: 24 May 1996 (aged 90); Los Angeles, California, U.S.
- Occupation: Actor
- Years active: 1936–1984

John Albert Chamberlain Kefford (5 June 1905 – 24 May 1996) was an English actor professionally known as John Abbott. His memorable roles include the invalid Frederick Fairlie in the 1948 film The Woman in White and the pacifist Ayelborne in the Star Trek episode "Errand of Mercy". He also played Sesmar in an episode of Lost in Space, "The Dream Monster", in 1966. Abbott was known as a Shakespearean actor.

== Biography ==
Abbott was born in the district of Stepney in London on 5 June 1905. He had two siblings - a sister, Ivy Skeates of Cambridge, and a brother, Harold Kefford.

In 1933, he began his career in show business when he made his professional stage debut in a revival of Dryden's Aureng-zebe with Sybil Thorndike. He then joined the Old Vic Company and appeared in Shakespearean roles, including Claudius in a production of Hamlet at Elsinore Castle in Denmark with Laurence Olivier, Vivien Leigh, and Alec Guinness. His first Broadway role was that of Count Mancini in He Who Gets Slapped in 1946. He also appeared on Broadway in Monserrat and The Waltz of the Toreadors. He made his film debut in Mademoiselle Docteur in 1937, and went on to act in scores of films in the next 30 years. Among his film credits are Mission to Moscow, Jane Eyre, A Thousand and One Nights, Humoresque, and The Greatest Story Ever Told. His television appearances in that time were even more numerous, beginning with pioneering broadcasts by the BBC before the Second World War.

In the early days of the Second World War, Abbott worked at the British Embassy in Stockholm. When the time came to leave, he had to go by way of the United States. While in the U.S., he was offered a part in Hollywood in 1941 and ended up living there for the rest of his life.

On American television between the 1950s and 1970s, Abbott had roles on a wide variety of series such as Kraft Television Theatre, Studio 57, Gunsmoke (lead character Edward Vanderman in S5E20’s The Tragedian” - 1960), Matinee Theatre, Bonanza, Thriller, Star Trek, Mannix, Iron Horse, and Bewitched. Although he was blacklisted during the Red Scare of the 1950s, a producer who wanted to hire him eventually succeeded in getting the actor removed from the list. In his last years, Abbott taught acting to students free of charge.

== Death ==
Abbott died at Cedars-Sinai Medical Center from natural causes on 24 May 1996 at the age of 90.

== Filmography ==
Year	Title	Role	Notes
1936	Conquest of the Air	Jean-François Pilâtre de Rozier	
1937	Mademoiselle Docteur	Armand	Uncredited
1937	Return of the Scarlet Pimpernel	Flower Seller	Uncredited
1937	The Importance of Being Earnest	John Worthing	BBC Television (live)
1937	Under Secret Orders	Armand	
1938	This Man Is News	Hood with Foreign Accent	Uncredited
1938	Richard of Bordeaux	Simon Burley	BBC Television (live)
1939	The Tempest	Prospero	BBC Television (live)
1939	The Saint in London	Count Stephen Duni	
1939	The Great Commandment	Starving Beggar	Uncredited
1940	Ten Days in Paris	André	
1941	The Shanghai Gesture	Poppy's Escort	Uncredited
1942	Joan of Paris	English Spy	
1942	This Above All	Joe	Uncredited
1942	Mrs. Miniver	Fred	
1942	Rubber Racketeers	Dumbo	
1942	Get Hep to Love	Professor Radowsky	
1942	Nightmare	Karl / Charles	
1943	The Gorilla Man	Dr. Ferris	
1943	London Blackout Murders	Jack Rawlings	
1943	They Got Me Covered	Gregory Vanescu	
1943	Hangmen Also Die!	Hostage	(scenes deleted)
1943	Mission to Moscow	Grinko	Uncredited
1943	Dangerous Blondes	Roland X. Smith	Uncredited
1943	The Cross of Lorraine	Baked	Uncredited
1943	Jane Eyre	Mason	Uncredited
1944	Once Upon a Time	Reporter	Uncredited
1944	The Mask of Dimitrios	Mr. Pappas	
1944	Summer Storm	Lunin, Public Prosecutor	
1944	Abroad with Two Yanks	Salesman	
1944	U-Boat Prisoner	Alfonse Lamont	
1944	Secrets of Scotland Yard	Mortimer Cope	
1944	Cry of the Werewolf	Peter Althius	
1944	End of the Road	Chris Martin	
1944	The Falcon in Hollywood	Martin S. Dwyer	
1945	The Power of the Whistler	Kaspar Andropolous	
1945	Honeymoon Ahead	Welles	
1945	The Vampire's Ghost	Webb Fallon	
1945	A Thousand and One Nights	Ali	
1945	Crime Doctor's Warning	Jimmy Gordon	
1945	Pursuit to Algiers	Jodri	
1945	Saratoga Trunk	Roscoe Bean	
1946	The Notorious Lone Wolf	Lal Bara	
1946	The Bandit of Sherwood Forest	Will Scarlet	
1946	One More Tomorrow	Joseph Baronova	
1946	Anna and the King of Siam	Phya Phrom	Uncredited
1946	Deception	Bertram Gribble	
1946	Humoresque	Rozner	
1947	Time Out of Mind	Max Leiberman	
1947	The Web	Charles Murdock	
1947	Adventure Island	Huish	
1947	If Winter Comes	Mr. Twyning	
1948	The Woman in White	Frederick Fairlie	
1948	Dream Girl		(scenes deleted)
1949	Addio Mimí!	Orchestra Conductor	
1949	Madame Bovary	Mayor Tuvache	
1950	Sideshow	Pierre	
1951	Navy Bound	Pappa Cerrano	
1951	Thunder on the Hill	Abel Harmer	
1951	Crosswinds	Algernon 'Mousey' Sykes	
1952	The Merry Widow	Marshovian Ambassador	
1952	Thunder in the East	Nitra Puta	
1953	Rogue's March	Herbert Bielensen	
1953	Sombrero	Don Daniel	
1953	Cavalcade of America	Colonel Barton	Season 2 Episode 2: "The Stolen General"
1953	The Steel Lady	Mustafa el Melik	
1955	Front Row Center	Businessman	Season 1 Episode 8: "Outward Bound"
1955	Front Row Center	Dr. Franz Gregorovious	Season 1 Episode 10: "Tender is the Night"
1955	Crusader	Igor Borovin	Season 1 Episode 9: "The Way Out"
1955	Science Fiction Theatre	John Bowers	Season 1 Episode 13: "100 Years Young"
1956	Crusader	Gustave	Season 1 Episode 26: "The Optimist"
1956	Jane Wyman Presents the Fireside Theatre	Barrett	Season 1 Episode 35: "The Hidden People"
1956	Telephone Time	Schliemann's Russian assistant	Season 1 Episode 9: "The Man Who Believed in Fairy Tales"
1956	Studio 57		Season 2 Episode 39: "The Brown Leather Case"
1956	The Adventures of Hiram Holliday	Thief	Season 1 Episode 2: "Lapidary Wheel"
1956	General Electric Theater	Ballet Director	Season 4 Episode 14: "Portrait of a Ballerina"
1956	General Electric Theater	Professor Meyerdal	Season 5 Episode 2: "The Glorious Gift of Molly Malloy"
1956	Gunsmoke	Professor Lute Bone	Season 1 Episode 14: "Professor Lute Bone"
1957	Public Pigeon No. One	Dipso Dave Rutherford	
1957	Omar Khayyam	Yusuf	Uncredited
1955–1958	Matinee Theatre	Jasper Purdy	5 Episodes
1958	Gigi	Manuel	
1958	Studio One	Travers	Season 10 Episode 44: "Bellingham"
1958	The Further Adventures of Ellery Queen		Season 1 Episode 6: "Cat of Many Tails"
1959	The Ann Sothern Show	Carter	Season 1 Episode 14: "Johnny Moves Up"
1959	Peter Gunn	Blankenship	Season 1 Episode 28: "Pay Now, Kill Later"
1959	Goodyear Theatre	Stefan	Season 3 Episode 1: "Story Without a Moral"
1959	Have Gun - Will Travel	Winston Ainslee	Season 3 Episode 5: "Shot by Request"
1959	General Electric Theater	Nathan	Season 8 Episode 12: "Absalom, My Son"
1960	Gunsmoke	Eddie	Season 5 Episode 20: "The Tragedian"
1960	Tightrope	Gideon	Season 1 Episode 19: "Cold Ice"
1960	The Many Loves of Dobie Gillis	Professor Dobkin	Season 1 Episode 20: "The Power of Positive Thinking"
1960	The Rifleman	Dr. Henniken	Season 2 Episode 26: "The Vision"
1960	Shangri-La	Chang	TV movie
1960	Shirley Temple's Storybook	Uncle Venner	Season 2 Episode 12: "The House of the Seven Gables"
1961	The Islanders	Harwood Gones	Season 1 Episode 16: "Escape from Kaledau"
1961	The DuPont Show with June Allyson	Professor Brent	Season 2 Episode 20: "A Great Day for a Scoundrel"
1961	Hong Kong	Alec Borg	Season 1 Episode 20: "The Hunted"
1961	Thriller	Kriss Milo	Season 1 Episode 25: "Trio for Terror"
1961	Adventures in Paradise	Murdock	Season 2 Episode 25: "A Touch of Genius"
1961	Great Ghost Tales	Mr. Arcularis	Season 1 Episode 7: "Mr. Arcularis"
1961	Ichabod and Me	Jeremy Lockhart	Season 1 Episode 6: "The Purple Cow"
1961	Bonanza	Zachariah Wickham	Season 3 Episode 14: "Gabrielle"
1962	Perry Mason	Professor Carlos Muntz	Season 6 Episode 1: "The Case of the Bogus Books"
1962	Alfred Hitchcock Presents	Mr. Abner Munro	Season 7 Episode 36: "First Class Honeymoon"
1963	Who's Minding the Store?	Mr. Orlandos	
1964	Flipper	"Professor" Marvello	Season 1 Episode 9: "Mr. Marvello"
1964	The Beverly Hillbillies	Sir Trevor Gielgud Burton-Guinness	Season 3 Episode 1: "Jed Becomes a Movie Mogul"
1965	The Greatest Story Ever Told	Aben	
1965	Perry Mason	Professor Durwood Tobey	Season 9 Episode 1: "The Case of the Laughing Lady"
1966	Gambit	Emile	
1966	Get Smart	Mondo	Season 1 Episode 17: "Kisses for KAOS"
1966	Lost in Space	Sesmar	Season 2 Episode 14: "The Dream Monster"
1966	The Munsters	Dr. Victor Frankenstein IV	Season 2 Episode 26: "A Visit from Johann"
1967	Star Trek	Ayelborne	Season 1 Episode 26: "Errand of Mercy"
1967	Bewitched	Leonardo da Vinci	Season 4 Episode 17: "Samantha's da Vinci Dilemma"
1967	The Jungle Book	Akela, the Wolf	Voice
1968	Three Guns for Texas	Banker Irwing	
1968	Land of the Giants	Professor Gorak	Season 1 Episode 4: "Underground"
1969	2000 Years Later	Gregorius	
1972	Cool Million	Sir Godwyn Phipps-Cheston	Season 1 Episode 3: "Assault on Gavaloni"
1975	The Black Bird	DuQuai	
1976	Sherlock Holmes in New York	Heller	TV movie
1976	Holmes & Yo-Yo	Montecito	Season 1 Episode 11: "Connection, Connection II"
1978	Outside Chance	Coroner	TV movie
1982	Slapstick of Another Kind	Dr. Frankenstein	
1983	Cracking Up	Surgeon	
