= Joan Harrison (screenwriter) =

English screenwriter and producer (1907–1994)

- Born: 20 June 1907; Guildford, England
- Died: 14 August 1994 (aged 87); London, England
- Education: St Hugh's College, Oxford; University of Paris
- Occupations: Screenwriter; Film producer Television producer
- Spouse: Eric Ambler (m. 1958)

Joan Harrison (20 June 1907 – 14 August 1994) was an English screenwriter and producer. She was the first female screenwriter to be nominated for the Best Original Screenplay Award following the introduction of the category in 1940, and was the first screenwriter to receive two Academy Award nominations in the same year in separate categories: for co-writing the screenplay for Foreign Correspondent (1940) (original) and Rebecca (1940) (adapted), both directed by Alfred Hitchcock, with whom she had a long professional relationship.

== Biography ==
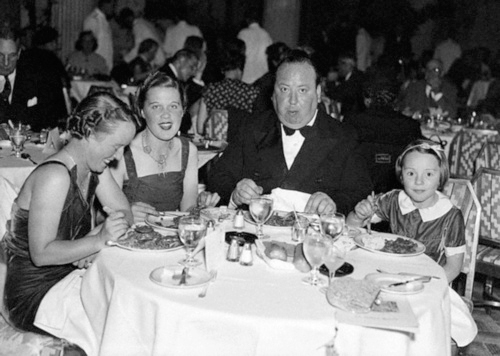
Joan Harrison, second from left, at dinner with the Hitchcocks (24 August 1937)

Born in Guildford, Surrey, Harrison was the daughter of a publisher of two local newspapers. She studied at St Hugh's College, Oxford and reviewed films for the student newspaper. She also studied at the Sorbonne. In 1933, she became Alfred Hitchcock's secretary after answering a newspaper advertisement. She began reading books and scripts for him and became one of Hitchcock's most trusted associates. Harrison appears in a scene in Hitchcock's original version of The Man Who Knew Too Much (1934), eating dinner with Peter Lorre's character. Hitchcock developed the habit of taking Harrison to dinner and recounting the details of hundreds of murders; Harrison had developed an interest in criminology. She worked with Hitchcock on other areas of his film's production with his wife Alma Reville. The couple became close to Harrison. She was among the screenwriters for Hitchcock film Jamaica Inn (1939) based on the novel by Daphne du Maurier, her first script.

When Hitchcock moved to Hollywood in March 1939 to begin his contract with David O. Selznick to direct films, Harrison emigrated with him as an assistant and writer. She continued contributing to the screenplays for Hitchcock's films Rebecca (1940), another du Maurier adaptation, Foreign Correspondent (1940), Suspicion (1941), and Saboteur (1942).

She became a film producer with Phantom Lady (1944), collaborating with the director Robert Siodmak. She was also credited as one of the screenwriters for Dark Waters (1944) after Phantom Lady star Franchot Tone persuaded her to work on the script as the writer of the original story, Marian Cockrell, was having difficulties with the adaptation. The other films she produced were The Strange Affair of Uncle Harry (1945), Nocturne (1946), Ride the Pink Horse (1947), and They Won't Believe Me (1947). At the time, she was one of only three female producers in Hollywood, the others being Virginia Van Upp and Harriet Parsons. Harrison was an uncredited screenwriter for Ride the Pink Horse (1947) and Your Witness (1950).

Harrison worked in television with Hitchcock together when she produced his TV series Alfred Hitchcock Presents (with Norman Lloyd) and Suspicion. She and Lloyd were later producers on the Hammer TV anthology Journey to the Unknown, which ran for a single season in 1968.

A biography of Harrison by Christina Lane, Phantom Lady: Hollywood Producer Joan Harrison, the Forgotten Woman Behind Hitchcock, was published in 2020.

== Personal life ==
Harrison married thriller novelist Eric Ambler in 1958; the couple remained married until her death in 1994. She and Ambler lived in London for the last 20 years of her life.

== Filmography ==
- Jamaica Inn (1939) - writer
- Rebecca (1940) - writer
- Foreign Correspondent (1940) - writer
- Suspicion (1941) - writer
- Saboteur (1942) - writer
- Phantom Lady (1944) - producer
- Dark Waters (1944) - writer
- The Strange Affair of Uncle Harry (1945) - producer
- Nocturne (1946) - producer, uncredited writer
- They Won't Believe Me (1947) - producer
- Ride the Pink Horse (1947) - producer, uncredited writer
- Once More, My Darling (1949) - producer
- Your Witness (1950) - producer, uncredited writer
- Circle of Danger (1951) - producer
- Schlitz Playhouse (TV series) - episode "Double Exposure" (1952) - writer
- Janet Dean, Registered Nurse (1954–55) (TV series) - producer
- Alfred Hitchcock Presents (TV series) (1955–62) - producer
- Schlitz Playhouse (TV series) - episode "The Travelling Corpse" (1957) - producer
- Suspicion (1957–58) (TV series) - producer
- Startime (TV series) - episode "Incident at a Corner" (1960) - producer
- Alcoa Premiere (TV series) - episode "The Jail" (1962) - producer
- The Alfred Hitchcock Hour (TV series) (1962–63) - producer
- Journey into Fear (1966) (TV series) - producer
- Journey to the Unknown (1968) (TV series) - producer
- Love Hate Love (1971) (TV movie) - producer
- The Most Deadly Game (1970–71) (TV series) - producer

== Awards and nominations ==
Year	Award	Category	Nominated work	Result	Ref.
1941	13th Academy Awards	Best Original Screenplay (shared with Charles Bennett)	Foreign Correspondent	Nominated	
1941	13th Academy Awards	Best Screenplay (shared with Robert E. Sherwood)	Rebecca	Nominated	
