= The Walking Hills =

1949 film by John Sturges

- Theatrical release poster
- Directed by: John Sturges
- Written by: Virginia Roddick (additional dialogue)
- Screenplay by: Alan Le May
- Story by: Alan Le May
- Produced by: Harry Joe Brown
- Starring: Randolph Scott; Ella Raines
- Cinematography: Charles Lawton Jr.
- Edited by: William Lyon
- Music by: Arthur Morton
- Color process: Black and white
- Production company: Producers-Actors Corporation
- Distributed by: Columbia Pictures
- Release date: March 5, 1949
- Running time: 78 minutes
- Country: United States
- Language: English

The Walking Hills is a 1949 American Western film directed by John Sturges and starring Randolph Scott and Ella Raines. The film's plot has film noir elements in its story of a search for an old treasure by nine men including a detective tracking a fugitive, several others who have things to hide, and a love triangle involving the two leads and the fugitive.

The film was shot in the Alabama Hills of California and Death Valley National Monument, locations Sturges returned to a few years later to film his classic Bad Day at Black Rock.

== Plot ==
One day in contemporary Mexicali, a poker game in the back room of a cantina includes horse breeder Jim Carey, cowboys Shep and Johnny, a prospector called Old Willy, a stranger in town named Frazee and a drifter, Chalk. Guitar player Josh and bartender Bibbs are kibbitzing. Conversation turns to a legendary wagon train carrying gold bars worth $5 million lost 100 years ago in the Walking Hills, a huge area of shifting dunes across the border in the United States. Johnny, not paying attention, casually mentions how his horse recently tripped over an old wagon wheel in the hills. To keep the discovery a secret, they agree that all of them including Jim's man Cleve must join the search for the wagon train.

The nine reach the apparent site but all the dunes have shifted since Johnny was there. Bibbs discovers an ox skull and Old Willy an oxen yoke and they begin digging. The group is joined by Chris Jackson, a woman who followed them from Calexico, where she works in a diner. Shep is really former rodeo rider Dave Wilson with whom Chris, herself a rodeo performer, fell in love at a rodeo in Denver, breaking off her engagement to Jim. Dave abruptly disappeared and Chris saw him again in Calexico after he showed up there as Shep, heading for the border.

It turns out that Dave Wilson had fled because he accidentally killed a gambler who accused him of cheating at cards. The man's father, King, hired a detective who turns out to be Frazee, and who has been sending signals to King and a posse with a heliograph. Johnny, Chalk and Cleve are also on the run and each believes Frazee is after him. Frazee shoots Johnny during a fight. Jim, told by Johnny that he would rather die than go to prison, has Cleve hide the horses to keep Johnny from being found out if someone goes for help.

A wagon is uncovered and tempers flare when no gold is found. Johnny dies right after Frazee admits he watched Chris as "hangman's bait," waiting for Dave to show up. A terrible sand storm develops, and Chalk tries to stampede the horses, killing Frazee with Frazee's gun. Jim kills Chalk as he tries to escape. The storm uncovers the entire wagon train. Old Willy finds it, but it's empty. Dave decides to turn himself in to the law and Chris, still in love with Dave, rides after him. Jim has a hunch, meanwhile, that the wagons weren't entirely empty when Old Willy found them.

== Cast ==
- Randolph Scott as Jim
- Ella Raines as Chris
- William Bishop as Shep/Dave Wilson
- Edgar Buchanan as Old Willy
- Arthur Kennedy as Chalk
- John Ireland as Frazee
- Jerome Courtland as Johnny
- Russell Collins as Bibbs
- Josh White as Josh
- Charles Stevens as Cleve

== Critical reception ==
A contemporary review of the film in Variety described it as having an "intriguing theme, good cast, and tight direction," adding that although the screenplay's "attempt to handle the cross-currents of greed for gold and a three-way romantic tangle is not fully successful [...] the main outlines of a sharp human conflict are made to emerge nonetheless," and noting that "Josh White adds importantly to the film with his renditions of a couple of blues numbers and folk ballads." A modern review described it as "an entirely forgettable western that could (and should) have been so much better," and having a "smattering of compelling sequences and [a] raft of better-than-average performances."
