= We Go Fast =

1941 film by William C. McGann

- Directed by: William C. McGann
- Screenplay by: Thomas Lennon; Adrian Scott
- Story by: Doug Welch
- Produced by: Lou L. Ostrow
- Starring: Lynn Bari; Alan Curtis; Sheila Ryan; Don DeFore; Ernest Truex; Gerald Mohr
- Cinematography: Harry Jackson
- Music by: Cyril J. Mockridge
- Production company: 20th Century Fox
- Distributed by: 20th Century Fox
- Release date: September 19, 1941
- Running time: 64 minutes
- Country: United States
- Language: English

We Go Fast is a 1941 American comedy action film directed by William C. McGann and written by Thomas Lennon and Adrian Scott. The film stars Lynn Bari, Alan Curtis, Sheila Ryan, Don DeFore, Ernest Truex and Gerald Mohr. The film was released on September 19, 1941, by 20th Century Fox.

== Plot ==
With his attention held by Rose Coughlin, a waitress, police officer Herman Huff nearly lets a thief get away until a customer, Bob Brandon saves the day. Bob decides to become a motorcycle cop like Herman and they end up partners, as well as rivals for Rose.

When the arrogant Diana Hempstead is pulled over by Herman for speeding, she uses her wealthy father's clout to get out of the ticket. When a visiting dignitary, the Nabob, is being guarded by Herman and Bob, the boys are disappointed in Rose's interest in him. Then everybody's embarrassed when the Nabob turns out to be a fake.

Herman and Bob eventually gain the upper hand, even making sure Diana pays for her reckless driving. While they continue arguing, Rose agrees to date one man one night, and the other the next.

== Cast ==
- Lynn Bari as Rose Coughlin
- Alan Curtis as Bob Brandon
- Sheila Ryan as Diana Hempstead
- Don DeFore as Herman Huff
- Ernest Truex as Harold Bruggins
- Gerald Mohr as Nabob of Borria
- George Lessey as J.P. Hempstead
- Paul McGrath as Carberry
- Tom Dugan as Jonathan Doremus Dimwitt
- Arthur Hohl as Hold-Up Man
- James Flavin as Police Lt. Bardette
- Arthur Loft as Francis X. 'Frank' Futter
- Charles Arnt as Refrigerator Salesman
- Ruth Clifford as Mrs. Kertz
- Dot Farley as Hempstead's Cook
- Charles Trowbridge as Defense Attorney

== Reception ==
The film was described as "a forties-style didactic comedy".
