= They Won't Believe Me =

1947 American film by Irving Pichel

- Theatrical release poster
- Directed by: Irving Pichel
- Screenplay by: Jonathan Latimer
- Story by: Gordon McDonell
- Produced by: Joan Harrison
- Starring: Robert Young; Susan Hayward; Jane Greer
- Cinematography: Harry J. Wild
- Edited by: Elmo Williams
- Music by: Roy Webb
- Color process: Black-and-white
- Production company: RKO Radio Pictures
- Distributed by: RKO Radio Pictures
- Release date: July 16, 1947; (U.S.)
- Running time: 95 minutes; 80 minutes (re-issue)
- Country: United States
- Language: English

They Won't Believe Me is a 1947 American film noir starring Robert Young, Susan Hayward and Jane Greer, with Rita Johnson and Tom Powers in support. Directed by Irving Pichel, it was produced by Alfred Hitchcock's longtime assistant and collaborator Joan Harrison. The film was made and distributed by Hollywood major studio RKO Pictures.

== Plot ==
After the prosecution rests its case in the murder trial of Larry Ballentine, the defendant takes the stand to tell his story.

In flashback, Larry recounts how he started seeing magazine writer Janice Bell, innocently enough, but feelings developed between them.

Unwilling to break up his marriage to Greta, Janice gets a job transfer. Larry says he will dump Greta and run off with her. But Greta realizes his plans and is unwilling to give him up. She tells Larry she's purchased a quarter-interest in a Los Angeles brokerage for him, and acquired a home for them in Beverly Hills. A combination of temptation, plus a heavy guilt trip weighs deeply on Larry's psyche, so he abandons Janice without either explanation or goodbye.

At the brokerage, Larry is reprimanded by his business partner, Trenton, for neglecting a rich potential client, but employee Verna Carlson shows Trenton a copy of a letter and lets Trenton believe it was Larry’s work. Verna is an admitted gold-digger, stringing Trenton along but interested in Larry; he lets her seduce him.

Once again Greta finds out about the affair, but will not seek a divorce. She sells out in L.A. and buys an old Spanish rancho in the mountains. Forced again to choose, Larry tells Verna he is ending their affair, to her bitter disappointment.

The ranch is isolated, without phone or mail service. Larry is bored, but Greta loves their life. After some time, she tells Larry that she wants to build a guest house for an aunt he despises, who reviles him in return. Finally confronting that he married Greta for her money, he claims that he knows an architect in L.A. who can do the job. On the pretext of calling him, he phones Verna from a general store down the road and arranges a rendezvous.

Larry tells Verna he will run away with her after cleaning out most of Greta's checking account. He writes a large check for Verna to cash, and leaves a farewell note for Greta. Verna meets him as planned, but uncharacteristically returns the check. She has also bought herself a cheap wedding ring, an inducement for him to follow through on his promise to divorce Greta and marry her. Choosing a penniless future with her over another return to Greta, Larry slips it on Verna’s finger.

As they drive to Reno that night an oncoming truck blows a tire and swerves into their path. Verna is killed and burned beyond recognition. Larry wakes up in the hospital, concussed. Verna’s wedding band causes her to be misidentified as Greta. Hatching a plan, he chooses not to correct the error.

Once he recovers, he returns to the ranch to eliminate Greta before she is seen alive. Finding the house empty, he goes to her favorite spot, a cliff by a waterfall. His goodbye note is lying at the top, and Greta’s body at the bottom. He dumps her corpse in the dark pool below the falls.

Depressed, Larry borrows against the estate and tours South America unsuccessfully trying to cheer himself up. In Jamaica, he runs into Janice. They reconcile, and she persuades him to return to Los Angeles. Later, arriving early at her hotel there, he sees Trenton go into her room. Eavesdropping, he learns that Trenton believes Verna was blackmailing Larry, who killed her and hid her body on his ranch, and that Trenton had put Janice up to luring him back stateside.

Ultimately, Trenton calls in the police. They find Greta's decomposed body, but assume it is Verna's. The local storekeeper is a witness to Larry and Verna driving away together the day both disappeared. The police buy Trenton‘s version of events, and Larry is tried for Verna’s murder.

While the jury deliberates, Larry is visited by Janice, who believes in his innocence and seeks his forgiveness. She promises to wait for him. He says there won’t be any waiting, and that the jury does not matter, as he has passed judgment on himself. Back in court, as the verdict begins to be read, Larry rushes to an open 12th floor window. Before he can jump he is shot dead by a courtroom guard.

The bailiff then reads the verdict: Not guilty.

== Cast ==
- Susan Hayward as Verna Carlson
- Robert Young as Larry Ballentine
- Jane Greer as Janice Bell
- Rita Johnson as Greta Ballentine
- Tom Powers as Trenton
- George Tyne as Lieutenant Carr
- Don Beddoe as Thomason
- Frank Ferguson as Mr. Cahill, Defense Attorney
- Harry Harvey as Judge Charles Fletcher

== Reception ==
In Time in 1947, critic James Agee wrote, "a skillful telling of a pretty nasty story ... Thanks to the fact that the ice was broken with ... Double Indemnity, Hollywood can now get by with filming this kind of shabby 'realism'. The blessing is mixed ... in this, as in most such 'adult' movies, the semi-maturity is well mixed with trashiness."

Critic Dennis Schwartz, in a 2003 review, called the film, "An outstanding film noir melodrama whose adultery tale is much in the same nature as a Hitchcock mystery or James M. Cain's gritty Double Indemnity."

Ted Shen, reviewing the film in 2007 for the Chicago Reader, also compares the film to Cain's writing and praises the acting, and wrote, "Cast against type, Young manages to be both creepy and sympathetic. Actor-turned-director Irving Pichel gets hard-boiled performances from a solid cast."

In an interview on The Dick Cavett Show aired on September 9, 1968, Robert Young claimed he made one picture in which he played a nasty character, resulting in a box-office flop, They Won’t Believe Me.

== Restoration ==
In 1957, the 95-minute film was cut to 80 minutes for reissue as part of a double feature. This was generally the only version available until Warner Bros. (the current owner of the RKO library) restored it to its full length in 2021. It premiered on Turner Classic Movies on May 8, followed by a Blu-Ray release via Warner Archive three days later.
