= Dark Waters (1944 film) =

1944 film by André de Toth

- Theatrical release poster
- Directed by: Andre de Toth
- Screenplay by: Marian B. Cockrell; Joan Harrison; Arthur Horman
- Based on: The Saturday Evening Post serial Dark Waters by Francis M. Cockrell; Marian B. Cockrell
- Produced by: Benedict Bogeaus
- Starring: Merle Oberon; Franchot Tone; Thomas Mitchell; Fay Bainter; Elisha Cook, Jr.
- Cinematography: John J. Mescall; Archie Stout
- Edited by: James Smith
- Music by: Miklós Rózsa
- Production company: Benedict Bogeaus Productions
- Distributed by: United Artists
- Release date: November 21, 1944 (United States)
- Running time: 90 minutes
- Country: United States
- Language: English
- Budget: $800,000

Dark Waters is a 1944 American Gothic film noir based on the novel of the same name by Francis and Marian Cockrell. It was directed by Andre de Toth and starred Merle Oberon, Franchot Tone, and Thomas Mitchell.

== Plot ==
Leslie Calvin, the shaken survivor of a ship sunk by a submarine, travels to her aunt and uncle's Louisiana plantation to recuperate, but her relatives, whom she has never met, have other ideas. She is befriended by a young local doctor, George Grover.

Mr Sydney (Thomas Mitchell) is a mysterious and fussy guest at the plantation. In a subtle nod to Gone with the Wind - Mitchell played the congenial Gerald O'Hara in the movie - the aunt tells Leslie that "Tomorrow is another day."

== Cast ==
- Merle Oberon as Leslie Calvin
- Franchot Tone as Dr. George Grover
- Thomas Mitchell as Mr. Sydney
- Fay Bainter as Aunt Emily
- Elisha Cook, Jr. as Cleeve
- John Qualen as Uncle Norbert
- Rex Ingram as Pearson Jackson
- Nina Mae McKinney as Florella
- Odette Myrtil as Mama Boudreaux (credited as Odette Myrtle)
- Eugene Borden as Papa Boudreaux
- Leigh Whipper (uncredited)

== Reception ==
The film was generally well received as accomplishing what it intended, with the New York Times stating it was "neatly produced and directed – and well played by an excellent cast."

=== Critical response ===
Slant Magazine's film critic, Glenn Heath Jr., liked the film writing, "Mood dictates narrative in Andre de Toth's Dark Waters, a hallucinatory jigsaw puzzle set in the deep swamps of 1940s Louisiana that becomes a perfect breeding ground for noirish shadows and deceptive wordplay ... Dark Waters ends with multiple dead bodies sinking into the bayou and Leslie directly confronting what one character calls her "persuasion complex." The bravura finale through the oozing locale is a stunner, and despite some surface romance that feels a bit forced, the film stays true to its mystically dark mood, a slithering distant cousin to Tourneur's I Walked with a Zombie.

== See also ==
- List of American films of 1944
