= The Woman in White (1948 film) =

1948 film by Peter Godfrey

- Theatrical release poster
- Directed by: Peter Godfrey
- Screenplay by: Stephen Morehouse Avery
- Based on: The Woman in White; 1860 novel by Wilkie Collins
- Produced by: Henry Blanke
- Starring: Alexis Smith; Eleanor Parker; Sydney Greenstreet; Gig Young
- Cinematography: Carl E. Guthrie
- Edited by: Clarence Kolster
- Music by: Max Steiner
- Production company: Warner Bros. Pictures
- Distributed by: Warner Bros. Pictures
- Release dates: May 7, 1948 (premiere–New York); May 15, 1948 (wide–United States)
- Running time: 109 minutes
- Country: United States
- Language: English

The Woman in White is a 1948 American historical mystery drama film directed by Peter Godfrey and starring Alexis Smith, Eleanor Parker, Sydney Greenstreet, and Gig Young. It was produced and distributed by the Hollywood studio Warner Bros. Pictures. The screenplay is based on Wilkie Collins' 1860 novel The Woman in White and is set in Victorian England.

== Plot ==
In England, on the night of April 4, 1851, Walter Hartright is walking to Limmeridge House when he encounters a woman in white who is lost. She is familiar with the Fairlies, for whom Walter is the new drawing master. The conversation ends abruptly when she is frightened by the approach of a carriage and vanishes. Walter does not mention her when Dr. Nevin in the carriage says he is looking for a runaway from a nearby asylum.

At Limmeridge House, Walter is welcomed by Marian Halcombe, cousin and companion of the heiress Laura Fairlie. He meets Laura's uncle Frederick, a neurotic who never leaves his rooms, and a houseguest, Count Fosco, who, though unseen, was in the carriage.

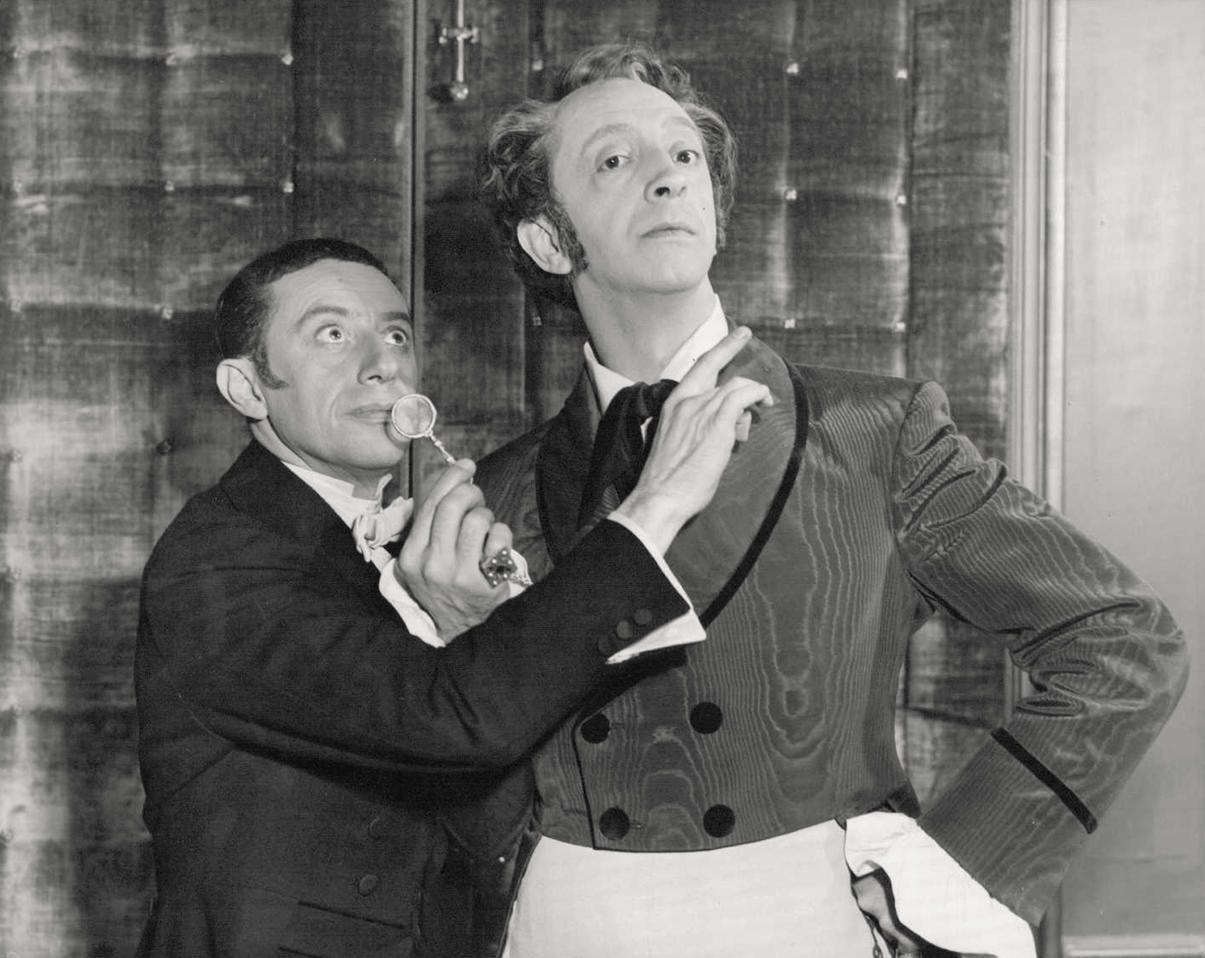
"An extremely amusing and well characterized study comes from John Abbott (right) as the eccentric and mentally unbalanced Fairlie", noted Picturegoer magazine

In the morning, Walter meets Laura, initially mistaking her for the woman in white. He tells her of his strange encounter, and she repeats his story to Marian, Fosco, and Mrs. Vesey, Laura's old nurse.

Prompted by a recollection of Mrs. Vesey, Marian unearths a twelve-year-old letter to her mother, written by Laura's mother, about the summer visit of a distant cousin, Ann Catherick, who resembled Laura. When the letter goes missing, Walter suspects Fosco.

Although Laura is engaged to family friend Sir Percival Glyde, she and Walter begin to fall in love. Glyde, hoping to move up the wedding in his eagerness to marry into Laura's wealth, arrives unexpectedly from Europe. It is apparent that he is conspiring with Fosco.

With the wedding a certainty, Walter leaves Limmeridge House. He again encounters the woman in white, who is Ann Catherick. She tells him that Fosco and Glyde tried to silence her by confining her to the asylum. She wants to warn Laura that they are coercing Frederick into allowing the marriage. Walter offers to take her to Laura, but Ann is afraid of Fosco and runs away. Fosco and Glyde deny the charges when Walter confronts them, and Marian refuses to believe him. Walter storms out and leaves England.

Laura marries Glyde, and while they travel in Europe, Marian spends six months with her family in Norfolk. Returning to Limmeridge House she finds that the servants are new, Mrs. Vesey has moved out, and the Count and Countess Fosco have moved in. Marian is unsatisfied with Frederick's explanation of these changes and regrets ever doubting Walter.

Back from Europe, Laura admits to Marian that she is afraid of Glyde, who will inherit her wealth if she dies. Glyde is willing to kill Laura, but Fosco prefers that she sign over her fortune, which he will share in, so he drugs her to make her compliant, and she is bedridden.

Ann emerges to warn the now-delirious Laura of the plot, but is terrified when Fosco and Glyde suddenly appear, and she suffers a fatal heart attack. The men announce that it is Laura who has died.

At the funeral, Walter learns that Marian now shares his mistrust of Fosco and Glyde. He recognizes Ann in the coffin and deduces that Laura is imprisoned in the asylum. Laura escapes but runs into Glyde, who is expecting Walter to interfere and has a couple of henchmen lurking. Glyde is killed when one of them mistakes him for Walter, who then overpowers the pair and rescues Laura.

Marian offers to leave the country with Fosco if he will sign a confession. Fosco reveals that his wife is Frederick's sister, and as a young woman she bore Ann out of wedlock in Italy, where she had been sent to avoid scandal. Laura, daughter of Frederick's late brother Richard, was born a year later.

The countess sees Fosco offer her emerald necklace to Marian, who declines it. The jealous countess fatally stabs Fosco and retrieves the necklace as Laura and Walter arrive with the police.

Walter marries Marian, and they have a daughter. They live at Limmeridge House with Laura and her son by Glyde. Countess Fosco lives in the asylum, now a more pleasant place thanks to the philanthropy of Laura, and Frederick resides across the street.

== Cast ==
- Alexis Smith as Marian Halcombe
- Eleanor Parker as Laura Fairlie/Ann Catherick
- Sydney Greenstreet as Count Fosco
- Gig Young as Walter Hartright
- Agnes Moorehead as Countess Fosco
- John Abbott as Frederick Fairlie
- John Emery as Sir Percival Glyde
- Curt Bois as Louis
- Emma Dunn as Mrs. Vesey
- Matthew Boulton as Doctor Nevin
- Anita Sharp-Bolster as Mrs. Todd
- Clifford Brooke as Jepson
- Barry Bernard as Dimmock
- Creighton Hale as Underservant (uncredited)

== See also ==
- The Woman in White – (1912)
- The Woman in White – (1929 - directed by Herbert Wilcox)
