= Phantom Lady (novel) =

1942 novel by Cornell Woolrich

- First edition
- Author: Cornell Woolrich
- Language: English
- Genre: Crime novel
- Publisher: J. B. Lippincott Co.
- Publication date: 1942
- Publication place: United States
- Media type: Print (hardback & paperback)

Phantom Lady is a 1942 crime novel written by American author Cornell Woolrich under the pseudonym "William Irish". It is the first novel Woolrich published under the William Irish pseudonym.

== Plot introduction ==
A man is first accused, and then convicted, of murdering his wife. As his execution date approaches, his friends and a sympathetic detective frantically search for his alibi, a woman with whom he'd gone to a Broadway show the night of the murder. None of the people who saw them together recall the woman.

== Film, TV or theatrical adaptations ==
In 1944, the novel was adapted to film, as Phantom Lady.
