= Phantom Lady (film) =

1944 film by Robert Siodmak

- Theatrical release poster
- Directed by: Robert Siodmak
- Screenplay by: Bernard C. Schoenfeld
- Based on: Phantom Lady by "William Irish"
- Produced by: Joan Harrison
- Starring: Franchot Tone; Ella Raines; Alan Curtis
- Cinematography: Woody Bredell
- Edited by: Arthur Hilton
- Music by: Hans J. Salter
- Production company: Universal Pictures
- Distributed by: Universal Pictures
- Release date: 28 January 1944
- Running time: 87 minutes
- Country: United States
- Language: English

Phantom Lady is a 1944 American film noir directed by Robert Siodmak and starring Franchot Tone, Ella Raines, and Alan Curtis. Based on the novel of the same name by Cornell Woolrich (writing as "William Irish"), it follows a young Manhattan secretary and her endeavors to prove that her boss did not murder his wife.

== Plot ==
After a fight with his wife on their anniversary, Scott Henderson, a 32-year-old engineer, picks up an equally unhappy woman at Anselmo's Bar in Manhattan, and they take a taxi to see a stage show. The woman refuses to tell him anything about herself. The star of the show they are watching, Estela Monteiro, becomes furious when she notices that she and the mystery woman are wearing the same distinctive hat. When Henderson returns home, he finds Police Inspector Burgess and two of his men waiting to question him; his wife has been strangled with one of his neckties. Henderson has a solid alibi, but the bartender, taxi driver, and Monteiro remember him but deny seeing the phantom lady. Henderson cannot even clearly describe the woman. He is tried, convicted, and sentenced to death.

Carol Richman, Henderson's loyal secretary who is secretly in love with him, sets out to prove his innocence. She sits in Anselmo's Bar night after night, staring at the bartender and unnerving him. Finally, she follows him home one night. He confronts her on the street and lets slip that he has been bribed to lie about the night of the murder. He runs into the street and is killed by a passing vehicle. Later, Burgess offers to help Carol unofficially, believing that only a fool or an innocent man would have stuck to such a weak alibi. Burgess provides Carol with information about the drummer at the show, Cliff, who had tried to make eye contact with the phantom lady.

Carol dresses provocatively and goes to another of Cliff's shows. Flirting with Cliff during the performance, she manages to capture his attention. They rendezvous afterwards, visit an underground jam session, and go to his apartment. Somewhat drunk, Cliff brags that he was paid $500 for his false testimony. He accidentally knocks over her purse and, among the spilled contents, finds a piece of paper with details about him on police letterhead. He accuses her of misleading him. Carol escapes, leaving her purse behind. After she has gone, an unidentified man arrives, accuses Cliff of admitting to the bribe, and strangles him to death.

The man turns out to be Jack Marlow, Henderson's best friend, who has ostensibly returned from South America to help Carol save Henderson. He secretly works to frustrate Carol's efforts, while hiding his own deteriorating mental state. Carol tracks down Monteiro's hatmaker and discovers that one of her employees copied the hat for a regular customer. With Burgess away on another case, Carol and Marlow go to see the milliner's client, Ann Terry. They discover her under a doctor's care, having suffered a breakdown several months earlier when her fiancé died suddenly. Carol is unable to get any information from her, but does find the hat. Marlow takes Carol to his apartment, supposedly to wait for Burgess. While she is freshening up, Carol finds her missing purse and the paper with Cliff's particulars and realizes Marlow is the killer. He admits to killing Mrs. Henderson after she refused to run away with him. Burgess arrives just in time to stop Marlow from killing Carol. Marlow throws himself out the window to his death. Henderson is freed, and the door is open to a relationship with Carol.

== Cast ==
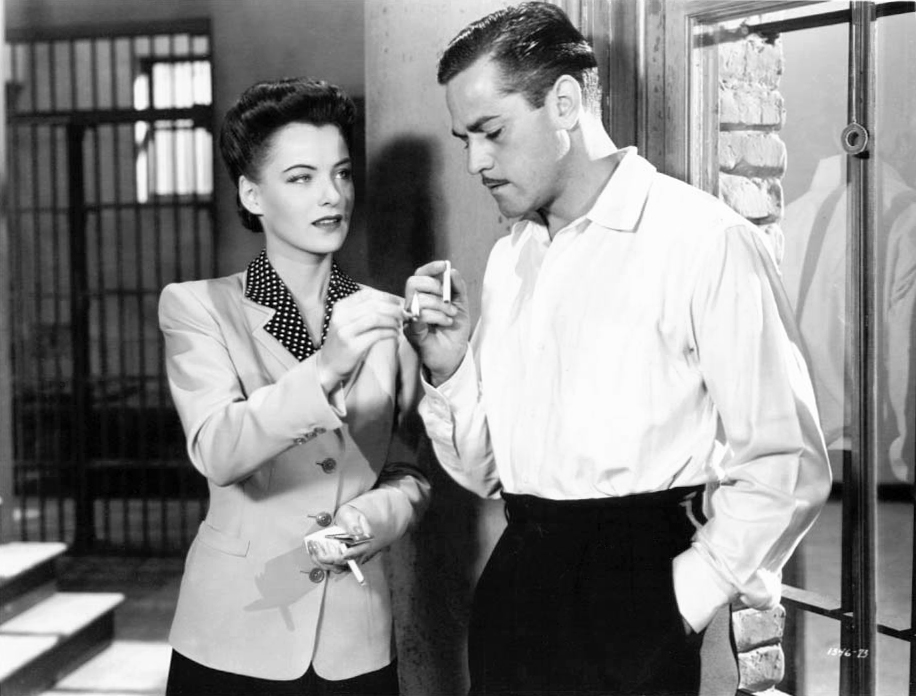
Ella Raines and Alan Curtis in Phantom Lady

- Franchot Tone as Jack Marlow
- Ella Raines as Carol Richman
- Alan Curtis as Scott Henderson
- Aurora Miranda as Estela Monteiro (as Aurora)
- Thomas Gomez as Inspector Burgess
- Fay Helm as Ann Terry
- Elisha Cook, Jr. as Cliff Milburn
- Andrew Tombes as Bartender
- Regis Toomey as Detective
- Joseph Crehan as Detective (Tom)
- Doris Lloyd as Kettisha
- Virginia Brissac as Dr. Chase
- Milburn Stone as District Attorney

== Production ==
Phantom Lady was Siodmak's first Hollywood film noir. It was also the first producing credit by Joan Harrison, Universal Pictures' first female executive and former screenwriter for Alfred Hitchcock.

Cliff's frantic drum solo was dubbed by former Harry James and His Orchestra drummer Dave Coleman.

== Critical response ==
Critic Bosley Crowther was not impressed with the atmospherics of the film and panned the film for its screenplay, writing: "We wish we could recommend it as a perfect combination of the styles of the eminent Mr. Hitchcock and the old German psychological films, for that is plainly and precisely what it tries very hard to be. It is full of the play of light and shadow, of macabre atmosphere, of sharply realistic faces and dramatic injections of sound. People sit around in gloomy places looking blankly and silently into space, music blares forth from empty darkness, and odd characters turn up and disappear. It is all very studiously constructed for weird and disturbing effects. But, unfortunately, Miss Harrison and Mr. Siodmak forgot one basic thing—they forgot to provide their picture with a plausible, realistic plot." In The Nation in 1944, critic James Agee stated, "Miss Harrison is doing nothing that Hitchcock has not done a great deal better ... She is simply an intelligent, entertaining worker in an idiom which badly needs not only restoring but developing ... There is plenty in Phantom Lady to enjoy, and to be glad of." Pauline Kael wrote: "The mood and pacing lift this low-budget thriller out of its class, but the ideas, the dialogue, and the ending that the studio insisted on prevent it from being a first-rate B-picture." Leslie Halliwell gave it two of four stars: "Odd little thriller which doesn't really hold together but is made for the most part with great style." Leonard Maltin was enthusiastic: "First-rate suspense yarn ... Sexual innuendo in drumming scene with Cook is simply astonishing ... " Eddie Muller called it a "breakout film" for Harrison and Siodmak: "They sacrificed some of the screw-tightening suspense in favor of a waltz into Woolrich's particular strain of darkness. In addition to the inky menace brushed over desolate locations, they amplified sounds of urban dread: the screeching of elevated trains, footsteps echoing on wet pavement, and, most famously, the scary abandon of an after-hours jazz club."

On the review aggregator website Rotten Tomatoes, 94% of 51 critics' reviews are positive. The website's consensus reads: "Joan Harrison's first producing credit, thanks in part to Hitchcock's tutelage, garners a heady murder mystery with ample suspense and creative trickery alongside great direction by Robert Siodmak."

== Home media ==
Universal Pictures Home Entertainment released a made-on-demand DVD-R of the film through Turner Classic Movies.

Arrow Films released a region A Blu-ray edition of the film under their Arrow Academy label on March 5, 2019.

== Radio adaptation ==
The Phantom Lady was presented on Lux Radio Theater, March 27, 1944.

The Phantom Lady was presented on Lady Esther Screen Guild Theatre September 11, 1944. The 30-minute adaptation starred Ralph Bellamy, Louise Allbritton, David Bruce and Walter Abel.
