= RASP =

A rasp is an abrasive tool used for shaping wood or other material.

(The) Rasp or RASP may also refer to:

== People ==
- Charles Rasp
- Christian Rasp
- Fritz Rasp
- Melchior Rasp
- Siegfried Rasp

== Other ==
- RaSP (Royalty and Specialist Protection), one of the branches of Protection Command in the Metropolitan Police
- Random-access stored-program machine, in theoretical computer science
- Ranger Assessment and Selection Program, the selection and training for the United States Army Rangers
- The Rasp (novel), a 1924 novel by Philip MacDonald
  - The Rasp (film), the 1932 film based on the 1924 novel
- Reactive aldehyde species, a class of molecules
- Residents Against SARP Pollution, an environmental group in the United Kingdom
- Runtime application self-protection, a computer software security mechanism
