= Anthony Gethryn =

- First appearance: The Rasp (1924)
- Last appearance: The List of Adrian Messenger (1959)
- Created by: Philip MacDonald
- Portrayed by: Claude Horton; Arthur Margetson; André Luguet; George C. Scott

In-universe information
- Gender: Male
- Nationality: English

Anthony Ruthven Gethryn is a character depicted in novels by Philip MacDonald and their cinematic counterparts.

== History ==
Gethryn is the series detective for more than a dozen of Philip MacDonald's murder mysteries, written between 1924 and 1959. He is an amateur detective who works closely with the police to pursue criminals.

In Macdonald's first Gethryn novel, The Rasp, Gethryn is presented as a British ex-secret service agent and newspaper reporter, who solves an intricate locked room mystery and meets his future wife.

== Bibliography ==
- The Rasp (1924)
- The White Crow (1928)
- The Link (1929)
- The Noose (1930)
- The Polferry Riddle aka The Polferry Mystery aka The Choice (1931)
- The Wraith (1931)
- The Crime Conductor (1932)
- The Maze aka Persons Unknown (1932)
- Rope to Spare (1932)
- Death on My Left (1935)
- Warrant for X aka The Nursemaid Who Disappeared (1938)
- The List of Adrian Messenger (1959)

== Adaptations ==
Gethryn was portrayed by Claude Horton in the 1932 film version of The Rasp.

In the 1939 film, The Nursemaid Who Disappeared, the character of Gethryn is played by Arthur Margetson.

In the 1940 film, Hangman's Noose, adapted from Macdonald's Rope to Spare, André Luguet plays the role of Gethryn.

The 1956 film, 23 Paces to Baker Street, based on the 1938 Gethryn novel, Warrant for X, conflates Gethryn's character with that of the playwright who overhears the conversation which triggers the plot. Van Johnson plays the role of Phillip Hannon, the blind playwright/detective.

George C. Scott played Gethryn in the 1963 film The List of Adrian Messenger, based on MacDonald's 1959 novel of the same name.
