= Home Chat (play) =

1927 play by Noël Coward

Alec Stone (George Curzon) finds Peter Chelsworth (Arthur Margetson) and Janet Ebony (Madge Titheradge) in seemingly compromising contact.

Home Chat is a play by Noël Coward, written in 1927 and presented in London in the same year. It depicts the domestic affairs of a married couple and their family and friends, and revolves around an unjustified suspicion that the principal female character has committed adultery.

The play was not among Coward's successes, closing after 38 performances. It was not professionally revived in London until 2016.

== Background ==
By 1927, Coward was well established as a playwright, having written more than a dozen plays. Two of them – The Vortex (1924) and Hay Fever (1925) – had been big box-office successes; his next two plays produced in London – Easy Virtue (1926) and The Marquise (1927) had been modestly successful but did not match the earlier two. Coward wrote a new play with Madge Titheradge in mind for the central role of Janet Ebony. He later admitted that he was not entirely happy with it, despite "some excellent lines and a resonably funny situation", but Titheradge liked it, as did the producer Basil Dean.

Coward later recalled, "The opening performance was rendered agonising by one of the more elderly actresses in the company forgetting her lines continually, with the result that the pauses she made while trying to remember them, coupled with the intentional pauses that Basil Dean had carefully rehearsed, frequently brought the play to a standstill."

Home Chat opened at the Duke of York's Theatre on 25 October 1927, directed by Dean. It was poorly received by reviewers and public, and ran for 38 performances, closing on 26 November.

== Roles and original cast ==
- Pallett (parlourmaid) – Pauline Newton
- Mavis Wittersham – Marda Vanne
- Paul Ebony – George Relph
- Mrs Chilham – Nina Boucicault
- Mrs Ebony – Henrietta Watson
- Lavinia Hardy – Helen Spencer
- Janet Ebony – Madge Titheradge
- Peter Chelsworth – Arthur Margetson
- Turner (his manservant) – Tom Woods
- Alec Stone – George Curzon

Source: The Times.

== Plot ==
Janet Ebony has been holidaying in the South of France. Returning, alone, she has offered the spare sleeping berth in her compartment on the train to an old friend, Peter Chelsworth, who had chivalrously given up his seat to an old lady. Although their friendship is wholly platonic they are subject to much suspicion after the train crashes and their occupation of the same compartment comes to public notice. Janet's mother and Peter's fiancée do not believe that the sleeping arrangements were innocent. To shock and silence her mother, Janet says that she and Peter are lovers. Her husband, Paul, believes this but forgives her. She is outraged at his acceptance of her supposed adultery and walks out on him.

The following morning Janet is at Peter's flat. He, meanwhile, has spent the night in a hotel. He returns, and the two discuss the strange state of affairs. They retreat to another room when Janet's mother and mother-in-law arrive together: they are aghast to overhear what sounds like a passionate love scene enacted by Janet and Peter to discomfit them. They depart, believing the young couple guilty. Peter and Janet expect her husband to be the next caller and she sits on Peter's knee to continue the pretence that they are having an affair. But the next caller is Alec Stone, a friend of Peter's. He has come to take Peter to lunch. He extends the invitation to Janet.

Within days, Janet has left for Paris. Friends and family assume she is with Peter, but in fact, although he is in Paris, he is accompanied by a female companion, Valerie Marshall, whom he marries before coming back to London. Janet returns from Paris and reveals that she has fallen in love with Alec Stone, and it was he with whom she was in Paris. She and Paul agree to an amicable divorce, which suits him as well as her, as he has fallen for one of their mutual friends, Mavis Wittersham, who has been out to ensnare him throughout.

Source: Mander and Mitchenson.

== Critical reception ==
The reviews in the press ranged from unenthusiastic to hostile. In The Saturday Review, Ivor Brown called Home Chat "only the shadow of a play" and the character "witless fragments of negativity". The Times thought that play contained some amusing and attractive pieces of dramatic manners, but blamed Coward for an unconvincing whole. The Manchester Guardian commented, "It was not easy to sustain even the slightest interest in the ultimate couplings of such human rolling-stock as this" and said that the play "lacked any proximity to an abstract comic idea or to some lustrous elegance of speech and manner". The Illustrated London News called the play "an amusing little trifle on the whole – but it is thin in its material and there are signs about it of hasty and careless composition". In The Observer, St John Ervine took a similar view: "Had Mr Coward spent another week in writing his play it would have been a much wittier one than it is. It might also have been less open to the reproach that it fails to deal with credible persons".

Coward gave his own verdict three decades later:

There were boos at the end, and I bounded on to the stage with my usual misguided valour and had a brisk interchange of unpleasantness with the gallery. However, no good came of any of it, and the play closed after a few weeks. I do not think it would have lasted that long had it not been for the acting of Madge Titheradge. When I wrote it, I naturally considered it good; so did she and everybody concerned, but we were wrong. It was a little better than bad, but not quite good enough, and that was that.

== Revivals ==
Home Chat was in the repertory of The Noël Coward Company, a touring ensemble set up in 1932 to present his plays around Britain. It was performed in a double-bill with Coward's Weatherwise. The United States premiere was given at the Majestic Theatre in Brooklyn on October 8, 1934 with a cast that included Rollo Peters as Paul Ebony, Edith Taliaferro as Janet, Philip Tonge as Alec Stone, Jill Stern as Pallett, Sherling Oliver as Peter, Stapleton Kent as Turner, Daisy Belmore as Mrs. Belmore, and Rosalind Ivan as Mrs. Chilham. That production subsequently toured to Philadelphia.

The first professional London revival was in 2016 at the Finborough Theatre. The reviewer in The Daily Telegraph wrote, "By no means a classic, this is still a powerful production of a forgotten feminist piece with … a woman taking control of her sexual and intellectual destiny. Written a year before women got the vote, it shows Coward as the firebrand of his day". The Times commented, "The tone slides awkwardly from bright, brittle comedy to over-earnest Ibsenite naturalism, and there never seems to be quite enough at stake, the relationships too thinly drawn for us to care which of them survives".

== References and sources ==
=== Sources ===
- Coward, Noël (1961). Play Parade: Volume Three. London: Heinemann. OCLC 489751608.
- Mander, Raymond; Joe Mitchenson (1957). Theatrical Companion to Coward. London: Rockliff. OCLC 470106222.
