= Weatherwise (disambiguation) =

Weatherwise is a magazine for weather enthusiasts.

Weatherwise may also refer to:

- WeatherWise USA, company of the Fixed bill energy pricing program
- Weatherwise, a character in 17th Century play No Wit, No Help Like a Woman's
- Weatherwise (play), a short 1923 comedy by Noël Coward
- WeatherWise, an online weather radar app on web browser and mobile devices
