= Sherlock Holmes in Washington =

1943 film by Roy William Neill

- 1943 US theatrical poster
- Directed by: Roy William Neill
- Written by: Bertram Millhauser; Lynn Riggs
- Based on: Sir Arthur Conan Doyle
- Produced by: Roy William Neill
- Starring: Basil Rathbone; Nigel Bruce
- Cinematography: Lester White
- Edited by: Otto Ludwig
- Music by: Frank Skinner
- Production company: Universal Pictures
- Distributed by: Universal Pictures
- Release date: April 30, 1943
- Running time: 71 minutes
- Country: United States
- Language: English

Sherlock Holmes in Washington (1943) is the fifth film in the Basil Rathbone/Nigel Bruce series of Sherlock Holmes movies. The plot is an original story not based on any of Sir Arthur Conan Doyle's Holmes tales.

== Plot ==
Alfred Pettibone, a British secret agent carrying a vital secret document, is murdered on his way to deliver it in the U.S. The British government turns to Sherlock Holmes for help. He deduces that Pettibone converted the document to microfilm. Avoiding an assassination attempt, he hurries to Washington, D.C., with Dr. Watson to retrieve it before it falls into the hands of an "international spy ring". Holmes is certain that the spies do not yet possess the document, as people who were in contact with Pettibone on his journey have been harassed. Pettibone's body was then delivered to Holmes by the spies as a means to throw Holmes off the track.

Before his death, the agent managed to pass the microfilm, hidden inside a "V for Victory" matchbook, into the unwitting hands of Washington debutante and bride-to-be Nancy Partridge. The matches get passed from hand to hand at a party, unknowingly, and end up in the inadvertent possession of the chief spy, Heinrich Hinkel (known as the seemingly respectable Richard Stanley in Washington), when he has Partridge kidnapped.

Holmes tracks down the ring to an antiques shop, where he confronts Hinkel. During their cat-and-mouse conversation, he even tells the spy that "the man who has it doesn't know he has it", with the matchbook in plain sight. Holmes is taken prisoner, but just as he and Partridge are about to be murdered, the police, summoned by Watson by prior arrangement with Holmes, break in and, after a gunfight, rescue the pair. Hinkel gets away, along with the matchbook, however. Holmes races to the office of Senator Henry Babcock, having led Hinkel to believe the microfilm is under a stamp of a letter in the senator's possession. Holmes arrives first and, as Hinkel eavesdrops, reveals the importance of the letter. Hinkel takes the letter at gunpoint, only to have the police capture him. Holmes then takes the matches and sets fire to the letter, before revealing that the microfilm was in the matchbook all along.

== Cast ==
- Basil Rathbone as Sherlock Holmes
- Nigel Bruce as Dr. Watson
- Marjorie Lord as Nancy Partridge
- Henry Daniell as William Easter
- George Zucco as Heinrich Hinkel
- John Archer as Lt. Pete Merriam
- Gavin Muir as Mr. Lang, government agent
- Edmund MacDonald as Detective Lt. Grogan
- Don Terry as Howe
- Bradley Page as Cady
- Holmes Herbert as Mr. Ahrens
- Thurston Hall as Senator Henry Babcock
- Gerald Hamer as Alfred Pettibone or "John Grayson" (uncredited)
- Clarence Muse as George, waiter (uncredited)
- Ian Wolfe as Antiques Shop Clerk (uncredited)
- Mary Gordon as Mrs. Hudson (uncredited)

== Production ==
=== Cast notes ===
Despite moving the film to the contemporary World War II period, the roles of Sherlock Holmes and Dr. Watson were retained by Rathbone and Bruce, respectively. John Archer and Marjorie Lord, who play an engaged couple in this film, were actually married when it was made. The two main villains played Holmes' nemesis Professor Moriarty in other films, George Zucco in The Adventures of Sherlock Holmes (1939), and Henry Daniell in The Woman in Green (1945). Gerald Hamer, who was in four more of Rathbone's Holmes movies, briefly appears in this one, in an uncredited but pivotal role.

=== Development ===
As in the previous two films, Sherlock Holmes and the Voice of Terror (1942) and Sherlock Holmes and the Secret Weapon (1943), Universal Pictures transplanted the Holmes characters from Victorian London to World War II. This was done to use the war as a topical background for the films' stories and themes. The film also serves as the first of the series to be wholly original and not based on any previously written material. The film's writing duo, Lynn Riggs and Bertram Millhauser, would collaborate on a Holmes picture for the first and only time. Riggs had written Sherlock Holmes and the Voice of Terror, while Millhauser would go on to write Sherlock Holmes Faces Death (1943) and The Woman in Green (1945).

== See also ==
- Sherlock Holmes (1939 film series)
- Adaptations of Sherlock Holmes in film
