= The Noose =

A noose is a type of knot.

The Noose or Noose may refer to:

- The Noose (1926 play), a play by Willard Mack
- The Noose (1928 film), an American silent film adaptation of the Mack play, directed by John Francis Dillon
- The Noose (novel), a 1930 novel by Philip MacDonald
- Noose (1948 film; U.S. title: The Silk Noose), a British film directed by Edmond T. Gréville
- Noose (1958 film), a Polish film directed by Wojciech Jerzy Has
- The Noose (TV series), a Singaporean comedy television program
- "The Noose", an episode of Aahat (Indian TV series)
- "The Noose," a song from the album Thirteenth Step by A Perfect Circle
- "The Noose," a song from the album Splinter by The Offspring
- "Noose", a song from the album Down by Sentenced
- Noose (comics), a fictional character from DC Comics
