= Millhauser =

Millhauser is a surname. Notable people with the surname include:

- Bertram Millhauser (1892–1958), American screenwriter
- Steven Millhauser (born 1943), American novelist and short story writer
