= Arthur Gould-Porter =

English actor (1905–1987)

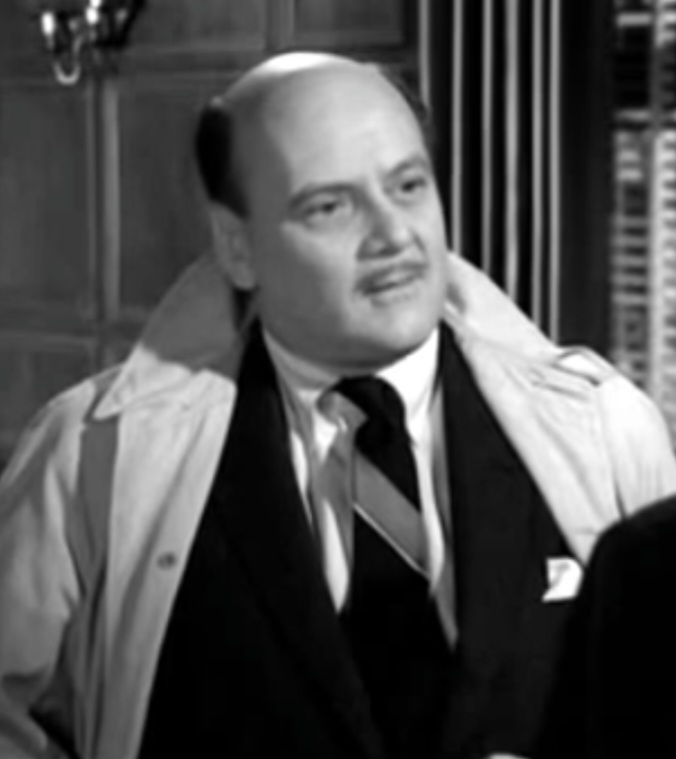
- Gould-Porter in an episode of One Step Beyond (1959)
- Born: 4 January 1905; Penzance, Cornwall, England
- Died: 2 January 1987 (aged 81); Los Angeles, California, U.S.
- Other names: Arthur E. Gould-Porter; A. E. Gould-Porter
- Occupation: Actor
- Years active: 1931–1977

Arthur Gould-Porter (4 January 1905 – 2 January 1987) was an English actor who appeared in films and on television and stage. His film and TV career spanned from 1942 to 1977, and although mainly a character actor he is remembered for his part as Captain Greer in Disney's Bedknobs and Broomsticks (1971) and for his reoccurring role as Ravenswood the butler in The Beverley Hillbillies. He was sometimes credited as Arthur E. Gould-Porter and A. E. Gould-Porter.

== Early life ==
Arthur Gould-Porter was born on 4 January 1905 in Penzance, Cornwall, to Archibald Gould-Porter and his wife, Mabel Amor. By the early 1930s Gould-Porter had moved to the United States and in 1931 he appeared at the Palm Beach Playhouse in A.A. Milne's Mr. Pim Passes By, to good reviews.

== Career ==
In February 1932 he appeared at the Forrest Theatre on Broadway in the comedy play New York to Cherbourg. He returned to Broadway in 1935 to start an 18-month run at the Broadhurst Theatre in Laurence Housman's play Victoria Regina. Other Broadway appearances included Bachelor Born (1938-39) and Oscar Wilde (1938-39).

By 1942 Gould-Porter was branching into film roles, with uncredited roles in Eagle Squadron, The Black Swan and Random Harvest. He also received his first credited role in 1942 when he appeared as Freddie in the American thriller Nightmare. Gould-Porter continued to find work throughout the 1940s, appearing in minor parts in a string of Hollywood films, including roles in Jane Eyre (1943), National Velvet (1944) and A Double Life (1947). He took a break from film in 1948 and returned to the stage, appearing at the Booth Theatre in Keith Winter's The Rats of Norway. The play lasted just three days before closing, and in 1951 he was again finding roles in film, appearing as a chauffeur in Kind Lady.

In 1952 Gould-Porter made his first appearance on television, appearing in an episode of the American detective series Saber of London. He followed this with further small film parts before landing his largest role to date in the comedy The Girls of Pleasure Island. Despite this larger role, it did not lead to greater success, but work continued to follow with an appearance in the Tony Curtis-led biopic Houdini (1953) and a part as the bartender in Abbott and Costello Meet Dr. Jekyll and Mr. Hyde (1953). More television work followed, and between 1955 and 1957 Gould-Porter appeared in The Colgate Comedy Hour, The 20th Century-Fox Hour, Topper, Lux Video Theatre and The Joseph Cotten Show.

Arthur Gould-Porter in Torn Curtain

From 1955 Gould-Porter began appearing in more notable film roles, included credited parts in Lady Godiva of Coventry (1955) and Top Secret Affair (1957). Although now appearing as a credited film actor, he instead found himself being drawn to more television work, and between 1956 and 1960 he starred in eight episodes of Alfred Hitchcock Presents. He followed this with more small-screen outings in Adventures in Paradise, One Step Beyond, Sea Hunt and The Rogues, amongst others. Of all the television shows he appeared in during the 1960s, he only appeared once as a recurring character, that of Ravenswood the butler in the comedy series Beverley Hillbillies, appearing in eight episodes between 1962 and 1966. In 1966 Gould-Porter made an appearance in an actual Alfred Hitchcock movie, taking the role of Freddy the Bookseller in Torn Curtain. This was followed with a bit part in Richard Fleisher's 1967 British musical film Doctor Dolittle, but he did not return to acting until 1970, when he made an appearance in another musical, Darling Lili. One of his final movie credits was as Captain Greer in the Disney musical Bedknobs and Broomsticks. His final television role came in 1977, when he played Winston Churchill in Eleanor and Franklin: The White House Years.

== Death ==
He retired to Los Angeles, where he died in 1987. He was never married.

== Filmography ==
- Eagle Squadron (1942) - British Sound Detector (uncredited)
- Nightmare (1942) - Freddie
- The Black Swan (1942) - Assemblyman (uncredited)
- Random Harvest (1942) - Attendant (uncredited)
- Assignment in Brittany (1943) - Naval Officer (uncredited)
- Holy Matrimony (1943) - Hat Store Clerk (uncredited)
- Northern Pursuit (1943) - Little Man on Train (uncredited)
- Jane Eyre (1943) - Young Man (uncredited)
- Song of Russia (1944) - Courier (uncredited)
- The White Cliffs of Dover (1944) - Captain Portage (uncredited)
- The Invisible Man's Revenge (1944) - Tom Meadows (uncredited)
- Frenchman's Creek (1944) - Thomas Eustick (uncredited)
- National Velvet (1944) - Attendant (uncredited)
- Confidential Agent (1945) - Flirty Passenger (uncredited)
- Scarlet Street (1945) - Critic at Gallery (uncredited)
- Gunman's Code (1946) - Jackson - Stage Passenger (uncredited)
- The Verdict (1946) - Shopkeeper (uncredited)
- The Imperfect Lady (1947) - Minor Role (uncredited)
- Singapore (1947) - Broadcaster (uncredited)
- Unconquered (1947) - Court Clerk (uncredited)
- Forever Amber (1947) - Moss Gumble (uncredited)
- A Double Life (1947) - Actor in 'Othello'
- A Woman's Vengeance (1948) - Bill - Warder (uncredited)
- Kiss the Blood Off My Hands (1948) - Bookie (uncredited)
- Kind Lady (1951) - Chauffeur
- Rich, Young and Pretty (1951) - Reporter (uncredited)
- Thunder on the Hill (1951) - Proprietor (uncredited)
- Thunder in the East (1951) - Mr. Corbett (uncredited)
- Just for You (1952) - Alcott Anderson (uncredited)
- Against All Flags (1952) - Lord Portland (uncredited)
- Million Dollar Mermaid (1952) - English Reporter (uncredited)
- Rogue's March (1953) - Mr. Paul - the Orderly (uncredited)
- Fort Vengeance (1953) - Constable (uncredited)
- The Girls of Pleasure Island (1953) - Rev. Bates
- Dangerous When Wet (1953) - English Steward (uncredited)
- Houdini (1953) - Alhambra Manager (uncredited)
- Abbott and Costello Meet Dr. Jekyll and Mr. Hyde (1953) - Bartender (uncredited)
- Money from Home (1953) - (uncredited)
- So This Is Paris (1954) - Albert, Butler
- The Virgin Queen (1955) - Randall, the Ship Builder (uncredited)
- The Girl Rush (1955) - Bit Role (uncredited)
- Lady Godiva of Coventry (1955) - Thorold
- Alfred Hitchcock Presents (1956) (Season 1 Episode 23: "Back for Christmas") as Major Sinclair
- Around the World in 80 Days (1956) - Minor Role (uncredited)
- Alfred Hitchcock Presents (1957) (Season 2 Episode 25: "I Killed the Count Part 1") as Clifton
- Alfred Hitchcock Presents (1957) (Season 2 Episode 26: "I Killed the Count Part 2") as Clifton
- Alfred Hitchcock Presents (1957) (Season 2 Episode 27: "I Killed the Count Part 3") as Clifton
- Alfred Hitchcock Presents (1957) (Season 2 Episode 30: "The Three Dreams of Mr. Findlater") as Rogers
- Alfred Hitchcock Presents (1957) (Season 2 Episode 32: "The Hands of Mr. Ottermole") as Herbert Whybrow
- Alfred Hitchcock Presents (1957) (Season 3 Episode 1: "The Glass Eye") as Hotel Manager
- Top Secret Affair (1957) - Holmes, Dottie's Butler
- Alfred Hitchcock Presents (1958) (Season 3 Episode 34: "The Crocodile Case") as Arthur Chaundry
- Alfred Hitchcock Presents (1959) (Season 4 Episode 21: "Relative Value") as Police Sergeant
- Alfred Hitchcock Presents (1960) (Season 5 Episode 16: "The Ikon of Elijah") as Major Parslow
- Sea Hunt (1960) - Season 3, Episode 21
- Pirates of Tortuga (1961) - Bonnett
- 3 Nuts in Search of a Bolt (1964) - Mr. Blyth
- Strange Bedfellows (1965) - Chief Mortician (uncredited)
- Do Not Disturb (1965) - Pickering (uncredited)
- Assault on a Queen (1966) - Officer #4
- Torn Curtain (1966) - Freddy - the Bookseller
- The Karate Killers (1967) - Magistrate
- Doctor Dolittle (1967) - Sir Rupert (uncredited)
- Darling Lili (1970) - Sergeant Wells
- Bedknobs and Broomsticks (1971) - Captain Greer
- Frasier, the Sensuous Lion (1973) - Motel Manager (final film role)
