= The Woman in Green =

1945 American film directed by Roy William Neill

- 1945 theatrical poster
- Directed by: Roy William Neill
- Screenplay by: Bertram Millhauser
- Based on: characters created by Sir Arthur Conan Doyle
- Produced by: Roy William Neill
- Starring: Basil Rathbone; Nigel Bruce
- Cinematography: Virgil Miller
- Edited by: Edward Curtiss
- Music by: Mark Levant
- Production company: Universal Pictures
- Distributed by: Universal Pictures
- Release date: July 27, 1945 (United States)
- Running time: 68 minutes
- Country: United States
- Language: English

The Woman in Green is a 1945 American horror mystery film, the eleventh of the fourteen Basil Rathbone-Nigel Bruce Sherlock Holmes films based on the characters created by Arthur Conan Doyle. It stars Rathbone as Sherlock Holmes and Bruce as Dr. Watson, with Hillary Brooke in the title role, accompanied by Paul Cavanagh, Henry Daniell, Eve Amber, Sally Shepherd, and Matthew Boulton in support.

Produced and directed by Roy William Neill from an original screenplay by Bertram Millhauser, the film follows a Conan Doyle premise with material taken from "The Final Problem" and "The Adventure of the Empty House".

This was Brooke's third of three different roles in the Basil Rathbone Sherlock Holmes films, after Sherlock Holmes and the Voice of Terror (1942) and Sherlock Holmes Faces Death (1943). Series regular Dennis Hoey's Inspector Lestrade was replaced with Bolton's Inspector Gregson. Daniell played Professor Moriarty, his third of three different roles in the Rathbone Sherlock Holmes series, following Sherlock Holmes and the Voice of Terror and Sherlock Holmes in Washington (1943).

The film is one of four films in the series which are in the public domain.

== Plot ==
When several women are murdered and their forefingers severed, Sherlock Holmes and Dr. Watson are called into action by Inspector Gregson, but Holmes is baffled by the crimes at the start.

Wealthy widower Sir George Fenwick has a romantic evening with glamorous young Lydia Marlowe, which adjourns to her apartment. After drinking a "special cocktail" mixed by Lydia's maid and becoming entranced by a bowl of floating flowers on her coffee table, he awakes ten hours later in a stupor at a flop house in a seedy part of London. Hearing a news crier hawking papers blaring a new mutilation murder, he cringes when he finds a woman's forefinger in his pocket. The next day his daughter comes to Holmes and Watson (unaware that Moriarty's henchman is following her). She tells Holmes and Watson that she saw her father burying something in their garden the previous night. Later, she dug up a box containing a forefinger and shows it to them.

Fenwick is then found dead in his home, obviously murdered to keep him from talking. Holmes theorizes that Moriarty, who was supposed to have been hanged in Montevideo, is alive and responsible for the crimes. Watson is called to attend to a medical emergency. Minutes later, Moriarty appears and explains that he faked Watson's call so he could talk to Holmes. Moriarty leaves, and Watson returns. Holmes describes what had transpired, notices that a previously shut window shade in the empty house across the street is now open, and sends Watson to investigate.

There Watson believes that he sees a man with a rifle shoot Holmes in his apartment through the open window. Holmes then arrives and explains that he put a plaster bust in his place as a target. Inspector Gregson takes the shooter, a hypnotized ex-army sniper, away, but the man is kidnapped and later killed and left on Holmes's doorstep.

Holmes has surmised that blackmail is the game, and is now convinced that Moriarty is having women killed, and their forefingers cut off as the "hook" to a blackmail scheme. He then has rich marks hypnotized, who awaken surrounded by clues convincing them they have committed the murders. The crimes are so heinous that even though a victim may discover he is innocent, he will still remain silent to avoid having his name besmirched through association.

Holmes befriends Lydia at the Mesmer Club, a magicians' society, suspecting that she is in cahoots with Moriarty. He's taken to her house to be hypnotized, but she asserts he is too anxious to be put under, and insists he take a pill containing cannabis japonica. Moriarty enters and has one of his men prick Holmes with a knife to confirm that he is hypnotized. He then has Holmes write a suicide note, then walk out onto the upper story ledge of Lydia's apartment, where he will be commanded to jump to his death.

Watson and the police arrive in the nick of time. Holmes then reveals he had foiled Moriarty's plan by secretly ingesting a drug that rendered him insensitive to pain, allowing him to fake hypnosis. Moriarty then wrests free from a policemen and leaps to the ledge of a neighboring building. However, he slams hard into a metal drain pipe, dazing him, which comes free and causes him to plummet to his death.

== Cast ==
The Woman in Green

- Basil Rathbone as Sherlock Holmes
- Nigel Bruce as Doctor Watson
- Hillary Brooke as Lydia Marlowe
- Henry Daniell as Professor Moriarty ("Moriarity" in closing credits)
- Paul Cavanagh as Sir George Fenwick
- Matthew Boulton as Inspector Gregson
- Eve Amber as Maude Fenwick
- Frederick Worlock as Doctor Onslow
- Tom Bryson as Corporal Williams
- Sally Shepherd as Crandon, Marlowe's maid
- Mary Gordon as Mrs. Hudson
- Percival Vivian as Dr. Simnell (uncredited)
- Fred Aldrich as Detective (uncredited)
- Leslie Denison as Vincent, barman at Pembroke House (uncredited)
- Olaf Hytten as Norris, Fenwick's butler (uncredited)
- Boyd Irwin, as short-tempered detective closing window (uncredited)
- Harold De Becker, as shoelace seller (uncredited)
- Alec Harford as Commissioner of the CID (uncredited)

== See also ==
- Sherlock Holmes (1939 film series)
- Adaptations of Sherlock Holmes in cinema
- Hypnosis in popular culture
