= Matthew Boulton (actor) =

English actor (1893–1962)

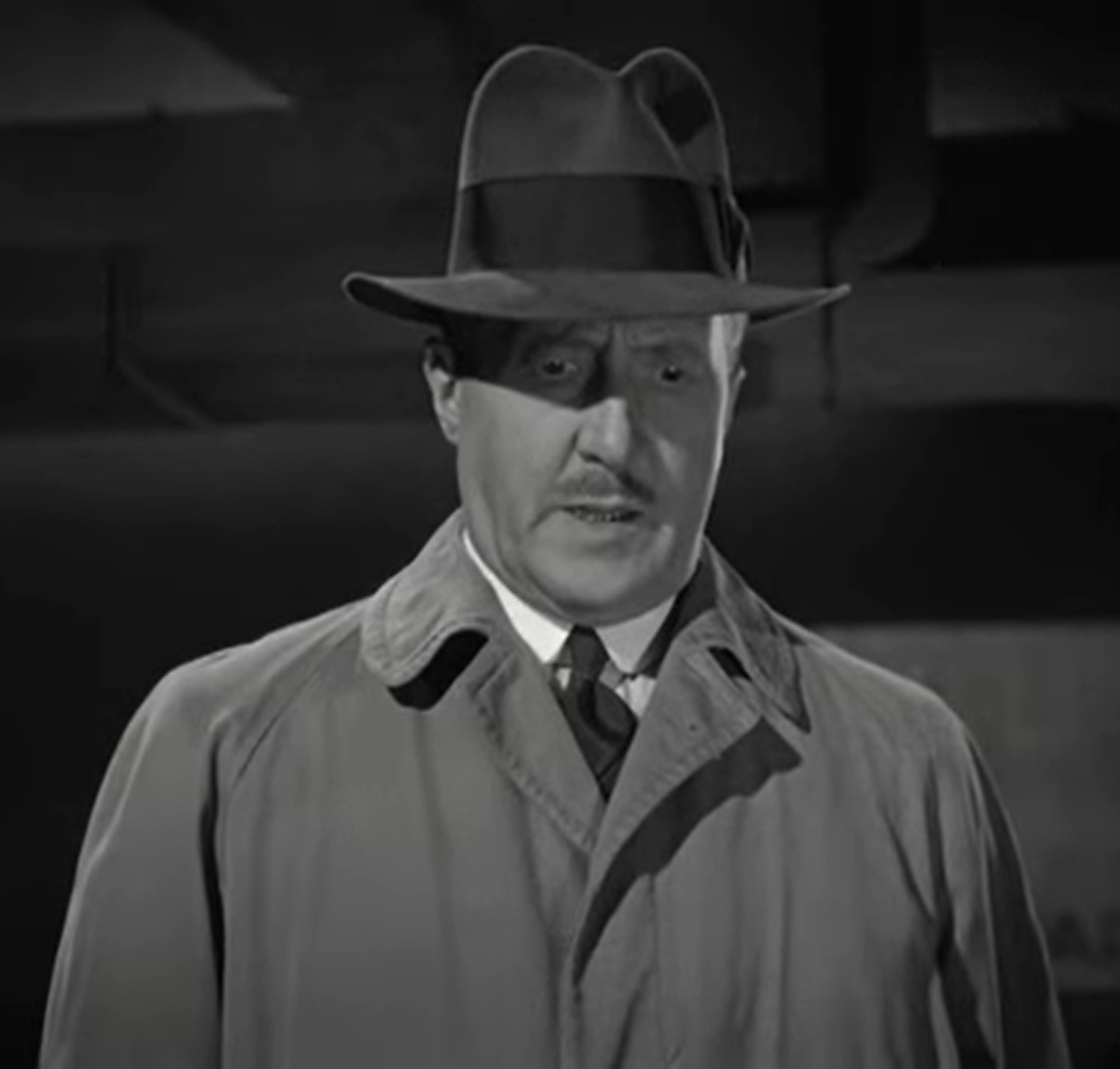
- Boulton in The Woman in Green (1945)
- Born: 20 January 1893; Lincoln, Lincolnshire, England
- Died: 10 February 1962 (aged 69); Los Angeles, California, U.S.
- Occupation: Actor
- Years active: 1927–1953
- Spouse: Ruth Dockray

Matthew Boulton (20 January 1893 – 10 February 1962) was a British stage and film character actor, who often played police officers and military officers. Having established himself in the theatre, he began taking supporting roles in films including an appearance in Alfred Hitchcock's Sabotage. He subsequently emigrated to Hollywood where he worked for the remainder of his career. His films in America include The Woman in Green (1945) and The Woman in White (1948).

== Partial filmography ==
- To What Red Hell (1929) - Inspector Jackson
- The Man from Chicago (1930)
- Bed and Breakfast (1930) - Police Sergeant
- Third Time Lucky (1931) - Inspector
- The Flying Fool (1931) - Minor role (uncredited)
- Creeping Shadows (1931) - Inspector Potter
- Potiphar's Wife (1931) - (uncredited)
- Keepers of Youth (1931) - (uncredited)
- The 39 Steps (1935) - Fake Police Officer (uncredited)
- Bulldog Jack (1935) - Police Constable (uncredited)
- Sabotage (1936) - Superintendent Talbot
- Shall We Dance (1937) - Ship's Officer (uncredited)
- Night Must Fall (1937) - Belsize
- The Thirteenth Chair (1937) - Commissioner Grimshaw (uncredited)
- The Firefly (1937) - Wellington
- Bulldog Drummond's Revenge (1937) - Sir John Haxton (uncredited)
- Bulldog Drummond's Peril (1938) - Sir Raymond Blantyree
- Lord Jeff (1938) - Inspector Scott
- Bulldog Drummond in Africa (1938) - Major Gray
- Vacation from Love (1938) - Captain Bering (uncredited)
- A Christmas Carol (1938) - Second Charity Solicitor (uncredited)
- Bridal Suite (1939) - Ship Captain (uncredited)
- Bulldog Drummond's Bride (1939) - Blake—Fingerprint Expert (uncredited)
- The Earl of Chicago (1940) - Ickerton (uncredited)
- The Invisible Man Returns (1940) - Policeman (uncredited)
- Adventure in Diamonds (1940) - Lloyd
- Phantom Raiders (1940) - John Ramsell Sr
- Mystery Sea Raider (1940) - Captain Howard
- Comrade X (1940) - British World Press Attendee (uncredited)
- Rage in Heaven (1941) - Ramsbotham
- They Met in Bombay (1941) - Inspector Cressney
- Dangerously They Live (1941) - Capt. Hunter (scenes deleted)
- Son of Fury: The Story of Benjamin Blake (1942) - Jury Foreman (uncredited)
- A Yank on the Burma Road (1942) - Rangoon Aide de camp
- My Favorite Blonde (1942) - Colonel Ashmont
- Tarzan's New York Adventure (1942) - Portmaster (scenes deleted)
- Counter-Espionage (1942) - Inspector J. Stephens
- The Undying Monster (1942) - Coroner (uncredited)
- Journey for Margaret (1942) - Air-Raid Warden #2 (uncredited)
- Random Harvest (1942) - Policeman (uncredited)
- Above Suspicion (1943) - Constable Jones (uncredited)
- Two Tickets to London (1943) - Brighton
- Holy Matrimony (1943) - Sergeant (uncredited)
- The White Cliffs of Dover (1944) - Immigration Officer (uncredited)
- Ministry of Fear (1944) - Official, Ministry of Home Security (uncredited)
- Secrets of Scotland Yard (1944) - Col. Hedley
- Our Hearts Were Young and Gay (1944) - Ship's Officer (uncredited)
- None but the Lonely Heart (1944) - First Police Desk Sergeant (uncredited)
- Nothing but Trouble (1944) - Prince Prentiloff
- National Velvet (1944) - Entry Official
- The Man in Half Moon Street (1945) - Det. Insp. Ned Garth
- The Brighton Strangler (1945) - Inspector Graham
- Molly and Me (1945) - Sergeant (uncredited)
- The Woman in Green (1945) - Inspector Gregson
- Incendiary Blonde (1945) - Doctor Diagnosing Tex (uncredited)
- Love Letters (1945) - Judge (uncredited)
- Kitty (1945) - Solicitor (uncredited)
- Of Human Bondage (1946) - Mr. Foreman (uncredited)
- Stallion Road (1947) - Joe Beasley
- Ivy (1947) - Tom Lumford (uncredited)
- Bulldog Drummond Strikes Back (1947) - William Cosgrove
- Unconquered (1947) - Capt. Brooks (uncredited)
- Tarzan and the Mermaids (1948) - British Inspector-General
- The Woman in White (1948) - Dr. Nevin
- Enchantment (1948) - Air Raid Warden
- The Secret Garden (1949) - Mr. Bromley
- Barbary Pirate (1949) - Tobias Sharpe
- Challenge to Lassie (1949) - Butcher (uncredited)
- Rogues of Sherwood Forest (1950) - Abbot (uncredited)
- The Racket (1951) - Simpson - Nick's Butler (uncredited)
- The Son of Dr. Jekyll (1951) - Insp. Grey (uncredited)
- Last Train from Bombay (1952) - Col. Frederick Palmer
- Loose in London (1953) - Ames (uncredited) (final film role)
