= The Hour of 13 =

1952 British film by Harold French

- Theatrical release poster
- Directed by: Harold French
- Screenplay by: Leon Gordon; Howard Emmett Rogers
- Based on: X v. Rex; 1933 novel by Philip MacDonald
- Produced by: Hayes Goetz
- Starring: Peter Lawford; Dawn Addams; Roland Culver
- Cinematography: Guy Green
- Edited by: Raymond Poulton; Robert Watts
- Music by: John Addison
- Production company: MGM-British
- Distributed by: Metro-Goldwyn-Mayer
- Release date: 27 October 1952
- Running time: 88 minutes
- Country: United Kingdom
- Language: English
- Budget: $873,000
- Box office: $756,000

The Hour of 13 is a 1952 British historical mystery film directed by Harold French and starring Peter Lawford, Dawn Addams and Roland Culver. It was written by Leon Gordon and Howard Emmett Rogers.

The film is a remake of the 1934 thriller The Mystery of Mr. X, based on the novel X v. Rex by Philip MacDonald.

== Plot ==
In Edwardian London a mysterious killer known as The Terror is on a murdering spree, having already killed ten policemen. Gentleman thief Nicholas Revel gets involved and helps the police bring the murderer to justice.

== Cast ==
- Peter Lawford as Nicholas Revel
- Dawn Addams as Jane Frensham
- Roland Culver as Connor
- Derek Bond as Sir Christopher Lenhurst
- Leslie Dwyer as Ernie Perker
- Michael Hordern as Sir Herbert Frensham
- Colin Gordon as MacStreet
- Heather Thatcher as Mrs. Chumley Orr
- Jack McNaughton as Ford
- Campbell Cotts as Mr. Chumley Orr
- Fabia Drake as Lady Elmbridge
- Michael Goodliffe as Anderson
- Moultrie Kelsall as Magistrate of Court
- Peter Copley as Cummings
- Richard Shaw as The Terror
- Sam Kydd as reporter

== Production ==
The film was made at Elstree Studios by the British subsidiary of MGM. The film's sets were designed by the German-born art director Alfred Junge. Some location shooting took place around London including Kensington Gardens.

== Reception ==
=== Box office ===
According to MGM records the movie earned $344,000 in the US and Canada and $412,000 elsewhere, making a loss to the studio of $424,000.

=== Critical ===
The Monthly Film Bulletin wrote: "This is a rather feeble kind of Raffles thriller, with Peter Lawford turning on a tired, aristocratic charm which is, one imagines, largely designed for American audiences. Though the climax is unusually savage, the thriller ingredients of this rambling story are thin and the period reconstruction half-hearted."

Kine Weekly wrote: "The picture goes with an easy swing and Peter Lawford, an ideal choice for the role of light-fingered ladies' man, Revel, sees that mayhem and murder are never taken too seriously. Dawn Addams is a delightful Jane, and Roland Culver and Leslie Dwyer have their moments as Connor and Ernie respectively. Tho staging is adroit, and menacing mist-laden exteriors and ornate interiors cunningly frame its light and sombre situations. At once, polished period comedy of manners and eerie thriller, it makes a refreshing change from high-pressure American crime fare."

Variety wrote: "French's direction, the scripting and the trouping of the cast keep the plot unfolding at an entertaining pace. Miss Addams is an attractive romantic foil, and Bond answers the stuffed-shirt demands of his role. Dwyer's cabbie is excellent. Culver, Gordon, Michael Hordern, Jack McNaughton and other British players making up most of the cast all do their part to make this good, light entertainment."

== See also ==
- The Mystery of Mr. X (1934)
