= Hangman's Noose =

1940 film by Léon Mathot

- Directed by: Léon Mathot
- Written by: Albert Guyot; Léopold Marchand; Charles Lafaurie (play); Philip MacDonald (novel Rope to Spare)
- Produced by: Antoine de Rouvre; Jacques Schwob-d'Héricourt
- Starring: Jacqueline Delubac; André Luguet; Annie Vernay
- Cinematography: Marcel Lucien
- Edited by: Marguerite Beaugé
- Music by: Jean Lenoir
- Production companies: Compagnie Française Cinématographique; Véga Films
- Distributed by: La Société des Films Sirius
- Release date: 23 November 1940
- Running time: 90 minutes
- Country: France
- Language: French

Hangman's Noose (French: Le collier de chanvre) is a 1940 French mystery film directed by Léon Mathot and starring Jacqueline Delubac, André Luguet and Annie Vernay. It is based on the 1932 novel Rope to Spare by Philip MacDonald about the detective Anthony Gethryn and is set in England. The film's sets were designed by the art director Émile Duquesne.

== Main cast ==
- Jacqueline Delubac as Lady Gladys Carter-Fawcett
- André Luguet as Gethryn
- Annie Vernay as Lucy Gethryn
- Georges Lannes as Le colonel Raverscourt
- Sylvia Bataille as Anny, la serveuse
- Paul Azaïs as Dollboys
- Georges Grey as Le capitaine Herbert Lake
- Marcel Carpentier as Dyson
- Georges Bever as L'inspecteur Pike
- Thomy Bourdelle as Bronson
- Suzanne Guémard as La femme du baron
- Marthe Mellot as La mère de Dollboys

== Bibliography ==
- Dayna Oscherwitz & MaryEllen Higgins. The A to Z of French Cinema. Scarecrow Press, 2009.
