= The Path of Glory =

1934 film

- Lobby card
- Directed by: Dallas Bower
- Written by: L. Du Garde Peach
- Based on: his radio play, "The Path Of Glory"
- Produced by: Dallas Bower
- Starring: Maurice Evans; Valerie Hobson; Felix Aylmer
- Production company: Triumph Film Company
- Release date: 1934
- Running time: 73 minutes
- Country: United Kingdom
- Language: English

The Path of Glory is a 1934 British "quota quickie" comedy film directed by Dallas Bower and starring Maurice Evans, Valerie Hobson, Felix Aylmer, Henry Daniell and Athole Stewart. It was written by L. Dugarde Peach adapted from his radio play.

== Preservation status ==
The Path of Glory is missing from the BFI National Archive, and is listed as one of the British Film Institute's "75 Most Wanted" lost films.

== Scenario ==
Two tiny European countries, Thalia and Sardonia, embark on a war. However, both have determined that reparations payments can be more valuable than the spoils of victory -- so both countries are engaging in war hoping to lose it.

== Cast ==
- Maurice Evans as Anton Maroni
- Valerie Hobson as Maria
- Felix Aylmer as President of Thalia
- Henry Daniell as King Maximillian
- Athole Stewart as General Ferranzi
- Stafford Hilliard as Ferraldi
- John Deverell as Paul
- David Burns as Ginsberg
- Frederick Burtwell as Pedro
- Harvey Braban as Colonel Conti

== Reception ==
The Daily Film Renter wrote: "Delicious satire of Ruritanian kingdoms both striving to lose war in order to secure the benefits of defeat! Cleverly inverted plot plays havoc with modern economics, and neatly burlesques current military, political and social thought. Exceptionally well acted, effectively directed, and dressed with witty dialogue. Leisurely opening develops on brisker lines, good photography and settings contributing to production that offers delightful entertainment to general run of halls."

Picturegoer wrote: " The trouble here is that the irony is laid on with a shovel and the whole atmosphere is entirely artificial. Subtlety in pictorial development would have achieved the right result, but as it is there is an almost amateurish touch about the production and far too much reliance on dialogue to drive home the arguments. Neither is the acting very impressive; this, too, seems to be tinged with the theatricality that colours the picture as a whole. Settings are adequate and camera work efficient."

Picture Show wrote: "A delightful and amusing picture, designed to make fun of governments in general. Felix Aylmer as the scheming president and Henry Daniell as the wily King give most entertaining performances. Athole Stewart as the general is extremely humorous. The rest of the cast are convincing in their respective parts. Excellent light entertainment. The settings are disappointing, but the photography is good."

== See also ==
- BFI 75 Most Wanted, with extensive notes
- The Path of Glory at IMDb
