= Philip MacDonald =

British fiction and screenplay writer (1900–1980)

- Born: 1 September 1900; London, England
- Died: 10 December 1980 (aged 80); Woodland Hills, California, United States
- Occupations: Novelist, screenwriter
- Writing career
- Genre: Detective fiction
- Notable work: Anthony Gethryn series

Philip MacDonald (5 November 1900 – 10 December 1980) was a British-born writer of fiction and screenplays. He is known for his Anthony Gethryn series, which started with The Rasp (1924).

== Life and work ==
MacDonald was born in London, the son of author Ronald MacDonald and actress Constance Robertson, and grandson of the fiction writer and Christian minister George MacDonald. During World War I he served with the British cavalry in Mesopotamia, later trained horses for the army, and was a show jumper. He also raised Great Danes. After marrying the writer F. Ruth Howard, he moved to Hollywood in 1931. He was one of the most popular mystery writers of the 1930s, and between 1931 and 1963 wrote many screenplays along with a few radio and television scripts.

His detective novels, particularly those featuring his series detective Anthony Gethryn, are primarily "whodunits" with the occasional locked room mystery. His novel X v. Rex (1933), aka The Mystery of The Dead Police, is an early example of what has become known as a serial killer novel (before the term "serial killer" was coined), in which an insane murderer is killing police officers one after the other. Perhaps his best-known novel is The List of Adrian Messenger.

His work in screenwriting included not only screenplays based on his own works (such as The Mystery of Mr. X in 1934, Who Killed John Savage? in 1937, based on The Rynox Mystery, and many others) but also original stories and screenplays for series characters such as Charlie Chan (Charlie Chan in London, 1934, and Charlie Chan in Paris, 1935) and Mr. Moto (Mysterious Mr. Moto in 1938, Mr. Moto's Last Warning and Mr. Moto Takes a Vacation in 1939). He did not receive any screen credit for his work in adapting Bride of Frankenstein. He adapted a story written by Agatha Christie for the movie Love From A Stranger (1947). MacDonald and Michael Hogan adapted the novel Rebecca by Daphne du Maurier, from which Robert E. Sherwood and Joan Harrison created the screenplay for Rebecca, the 1940 film. Sherwood and Harrison were nominated for an Academy Award.

MacDonald's 1927 novel Patrol was issued as one of the first twenty Penguin Books in 1935. He won the annual Short Story Edgar Award twice, in 1953 for the collection Something to Hide and Other Stories (published in the UK as Fingers of Fear and Other Stories) and in 1956 for the individual short story "Dream No More". He also wrote television scripts for Alfred Hitchcock Presents ("Malice Domestic", 1957) and Perry Mason ("The Case of the Terrified Typist", 1958).

As "W.J. Stuart", MacDonald wrote the novelisation of the 1956 science fiction film Forbidden Planet. He also dabbled in science fiction under his own name, writing at least four SF short stories over a span of decades. Two of them are frequently issued in anthologies ("Our Feathered Friends", 1931, and "Private – Keep Out!", 1949).

MacDonald died in Woodland Hills, California.

A critical essay on MacDonald's crime novels appears in S. T. Joshi's book Varieties of Crime Fiction (Wildside Press, 2019) ISBN 978-1-4794-4546-2.

== Bibliography of works by Philip MacDonald ==
Some sources list The Singing Scorpion as a title by MacDonald; in fact, this novel was written by a different writer, Allan Colt MacDonald.

- The Rasp (1924, featuring Anthony Gethryn). Serialised in American newspapers
- Queen's Mate (1926)
- Patrol (a.k.a. The Lost Patrol) (1927)
- The White Crow (1928, featuring Anthony Gethryn)
- Likeness of Exe (1929)
- The Noose (1930). Serialised, Manchester Evening News (1930, featuring Anthony Gethryn)
- The Link (1930, featuring Anthony Gethryn)
- Rynox (1930) (a.k.a. The Rynox Murder Mystery, The Rynox Mystery, The Rynox Murder)
- The Choice (a.k.a. The Polferry Mystery and The Polferry Riddle) (1931, featuring Anthony Gethryn)
- The Crime Conductor (1931, featuring Anthony Gethryn)
- Murder Gone Mad (1931)
- The Wraith (1931, featuring Anthony Gethryn)
- The Maze (a.k.a. Persons Unknown, featuring Anthony Gethryn) (1932)
- Rope to Spare (1932, featuring Anthony Gethryn)
- Death on My Left (1933, featuring Anthony Gethryn)
- R.I.P. (a.k.a. Menace) (1933)
- Glitter (1934)
- The Nursemaid Who Disappeared (a.k.a. Warrant for X) (1938, featuring Anthony Gethryn)
- The Dark Wheel (a.k.a. Sweet and Deadly) with A. Boyd Correll (1948)
- Something to Hide (a.k.a. Fingers of Fear) (1952)
- The Man out of the Rain (1955)
- Guest in the House (a.k.a. No Time for Terror) (1955)
- The List of Adrian Messenger (1959, featuring Anthony Gethryn). Serialised in American newspapers as Murder Seed. The novel has many points of similarity with Macdonald's screenplay for the film Circle of Danger
- Death & Chicanery (1962)

=== As Oliver Fleming ===
- Ambrotox and Limping Dick (1920), with Ronald MacDonald
- The Spandau Quid (1923), with Ronald MacDonald

=== As Anthony Lawless ===
- Harbour (1931)
- Moonfisher (1931)

=== As Martin Porlock ===
- Mystery at Friar's Pardon (1931)
- Mystery in Kensington Gore (1932) (a.k.a. Escape)
- X v. Rex (1933) (a.k.a. The Mystery of Mr. X and Mystery of the Dead Police). Serialised in American newspapers as 'Who Killed C*ck Robin Hoode?’. (Later republished as Mystery of the Dead Police by Philip MacDonald as Pocket Books #70, 1940)

=== As W. J. Stuart ===
- Forbidden Planet (1956, novelization of film)

=== As Warren Stuart ===
- The Sword and the Net (1941)

== Film scripts by Macdonald ==
- 1934 – Charlie Chan in London
- 19?? – Charlie Chan in Paris
- 1932 – Hotel Splendide. Written with Ralph Smart
- 1933 – Star Reporter
- 1934 – The Mystery of Mr X
- 1935 – The Last Outpost
- 1936 – Yours for the Asking. Written with Eve Green and Harlan Ware, directed by Alexander Hall
- 1938 – Mysterious Mr. Moto, directed by Norman Foster
- 1939 – Mr. Moto's Last Warning, directed by Norman Foster
- 1939 – Blind Alley, directed by Charles Vidor
- 1939 – Mr. Moto Takes a Vacation, written with Norman Foster, directed by Norman Foster
- 1942 – Nightmare
- 1945 – The Body Snatcher, written with Val Lewton (as Carlos Keith), directed by Robert Wise
- 1947 – Love from a Stranger, directed by Richard Whorf
- 1948 – The Dark Past, written with Michael Blankfort and Albert Duffy, directed by Rudolph Mate
- 1948 – Kiss the Blood Off My Hands, uncredited, adapted from a Gerald Butler novel, screenplay with Leonardo Bercovici
- 1951 – Circle of Danger, directed by Jacques Tourneur

== Films based on works by MacDonald ==
- 1929 – Lost Patrol (the novel Patrol), directed by Walter Summers
- 1932 – The Rasp, directed by Michael Powell
- 1932 – Rynox, directed by Michael Powell
- 1934 – The Lost Patrol (the novel Patrol), directed by John Ford
- 1934 – The Mystery of Mr. X (the novel X v. Rex), directed by Edgar Selwyn
- 1934 – Menace, originally to be titled Deep Night (the novel of the same name), directed by Ralph Murphy
- 1936 – The Princess Comes Across, directed by William K Howard
- 1937 – Who Killed John Savage? (the novel Rynox), directed by Maurice Elvey
- 1939 – A Gentleman's Gentleman (the play), directed by Roy William Neill
- 1939 – The Nursemaid Who Disappeared (the novel Warrant for X), directed by Arthur B. Woods
- 1940 – Hangman's Noose (the novel Rope to Spare), directed by Léon Mathot
- 1942 – Nightmare, directed by Tim Whelan
- 1942 – Whispering Ghosts, directed by Alfred Werker
- 1943 – Sahara, directed by Zoltan Korda
- 1944 – Action in Arabia, directed by Leonard Mingus
- 1945 – Dangerous Intruder, directed by Vernon Keays
- 1952 – The Hour of 13 (the novel X v. Rex), directed by Harold French
- 1956 – 23 Paces to Baker Street (the novel Warrant for X), directed by Henry Hathaway
- 1963 – The List of Adrian Messenger, directed by John Huston
