= The Dark Wheel =

1948 novel by Philip MacDonald and A. Boyd Correll

- First US edition cover
- Author: Philip MacDonald, A. Boyd Correll
- Language: English
- Genre: crime novel
- Publisher: Morrow
- Publication date: 1948
- Publication place: United States
- Media type: Print (Hardcover)
- Pages: 256 p.
- OCLC: 3703774

The Dark Wheel is a crime novel by Philip MacDonald and A. Boyd Correll.

== Plot introduction ==
The novel centers on Cornelius Van Toller, a wealthy New Yorker, with Jekyll-and-Hyde character. His obsession with actress Kay Forrester sets the stage for a thrilling drama.

== Publication history ==
- 1948, USA, New York, Morrow, OCLC: 3703774, Hardback
- 1948, UK, London, Collins Crime Club, OCLC: 31027640, Hardback
- 1959, USA, New York, Zenith Books, OCLC: 7396423, Paperback, as Sweet and Deadly
