= The Man out of the Rain =

- First US edition cover
- Author: Philip MacDonald
- Language: English
- Genre: crime short stories collection
- Publisher: Doubleday Crime Club
- Publication date: 1955
- Publication place: United States
- Media type: Print (hardcover)
- Pages: 189 p.
- OCLC: 1381749

The Man out of the Rain is a collection of crime short stories by Philip MacDonald.

== Contents ==
- Dream No More, first published in Ellery Queen's Mystery Magazine, November 1955; winner of 1956 Edgar Award for the best short story
- The Go-Between
- The Man out of the Rain, first published in Ellery Queen's Mystery Magazine, September 1954
- Ten O’Clock, first published in Creeps by Night, ed. Dashiell Hammett, John Day, 1931
- The Elephant’s Head
- His Mother’s Eyes, first published in Tales of Mystery, ed. Ernest Rhys & C.A. Dawson-Scott, Hutchinson, 1927

== Publication history ==
- 1955, USA, New York, Doubleday Crime Club, OCLC: 1381749, Hardback
- 1957, UK, London, Herbert Jenkins, OCLC: 3867653, Hardback
