= The Awful Truth (1929 film) =

1929 film

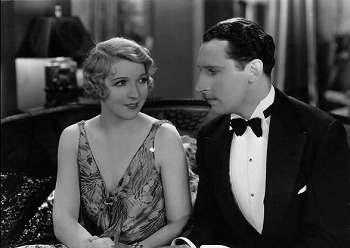
- Ina Claire and Henry Daniell
- Directed by: Marshall Neilan
- Written by: Horace Jackson
- Screenplay by: Arthur Richman
- Based on: The Awful Truth; 1922 play by Arthur Richman
- Produced by: Maurice Revnes
- Starring: Ina Claire; Henry Daniell
- Cinematography: David Abel
- Edited by: Frank E. Hull
- Production company: Pathé Exchange
- Distributed by: Pathé Exchange
- Release date: August 10, 1929
- Running time: 68 minutes
- Country: United States
- Language: English

The Awful Truth is a 1929 American pre-Code romantic comedy film directed by Marshall Neilan and starring Ina Claire and Henry Daniell. It was distributed by Pathé Exchange. The screenplay was written by Horace Jackson and Arthur Richman, based on a play by Richman. Ina Claire starred in the original stage version on Broadway in 1922. The film is now considered lost.

== Cast ==
- Ina Claire as Lucy Warriner
- Henry Daniell as Jerry Warriner
- Theodore von Eltz as Edgar Trent
- Paul Harvey as Dan Leeson
- Blanche Friderici as Mrs. Leeson
- Judith Vosselli as Josephine Trent
- John Roche as Jimmy Kempster

== Other versions ==
There were two other film versions of the play on which the 1929 film was based: the 1925 silent version The Awful Truth with Agnes Ayres and Warner Baxter; and the 1937 film The Awful Truth starring Irene Dunne and Cary Grant. The play was also remade unsuccessfully in color as the musical Let's Do It Again (1953), starring Jane Wyman and Ray Milland.

== See also ==
- List of early sound feature films (1926–1929)
