= 23 Paces to Baker Street =

1956 film by Henry Hathaway

- Theatrical release lobby card
- Directed by: Henry Hathaway
- Screenplay by: Nigel Balchin
- Based on: Warrant for X 1938 novel by Philip MacDonald
- Produced by: Henry Ephron
- Starring: Van Johnson; Vera Miles; Cecil Parker
- Cinematography: Milton R. Krasner
- Edited by: James B. Clark
- Music by: Leigh Harline
- Production company: 20th Century Fox
- Distributed by: 20th Century Fox
- Release date: May 18, 1956
- Running time: 103 minutes
- Country: United States
- Language: English
- Budget: $1,375,000
- Box office: $1 million (US rentals)

23 Paces to Baker Street is a 1956 American DeLuxe Color mystery thriller film directed by Henry Hathaway. It was released by 20th Century-Fox and filmed in CinemaScope on location in London. The screenplay by Nigel Balchin was based on the 1938 novel Warrant for X by Philip MacDonald.

The 1939 British film The Nursemaid Who Disappeared was also based on MacDonald's novel.

== Plot ==
Philip Hannon is a blind playwright who lives in a London flat with a spectacular view over the River Thames between Waterloo Bridge and Charing Cross Station. One day, he overhears part of a conversation in a pub that possibly involves a plot to commit a crime. He tries to contact Inspector Grovening, who offers no help, so Hannon, his butler and his American ex-fiancée Jean seek to bring the kidnappers to justice. Their sleuthing soon leads them to a nanny agency with dire repercussions.

== Cast ==
- Van Johnson as Phillip Hannon
- Vera Miles as Jean Lennox
- Cecil Parker as Bob Matthews
- Patricia Laffan as Miss Alice MacDonald
- Maurice Denham as Inspector Grovening
- Isobel Elsom as Lady Syrett
- Estelle Winwood as Barmaid
- Liam Redmond as Mr. Murch
- Martin Benson as Pillings
- Natalie Norwick as Janet Murch
- Terence De Marney as Sergeant Luce

== Reception ==
In a contemporary review for The New York Times, critic Bosley Crowther wrote:

[A] large part of this picture is curiously casual and slow, as Van Johnson, as the blind man, bores the mischief out of everybody with his hazy suspicions. He bores Vera Miles as his ex-sweetheart. She would much rather bill and coo. He bores Cecil Parker as his butler. He would rather make cultivated gags. And, for that matter, he bores the audience, too. ... [M]atters do start popping about half or two-thirds of the way along, when it is finally discovered, through various coincidences, that something has been cooking all the time. But you have to depend on Mr. Johnson—and Nigel Balchin, the screenwriter—to give you the details after they've been discovered. This is not a good way to get people interested in a mystery show. ... But it would be a more exciting picture if it got going with a little more snap, established a more compelling mystery and built up some genuine suspense.

== See also ==
- List of American films of 1956
