= Nightmare (1942 film) =

1942 American thriller film directed by Tim Whelan

- Film poster
- Directed by: Tim Whelan
- Screenplay by: Dwight Taylor
- Based on: Escape; 1932 novel by Philip MacDonald
- Produced by: Dwight Taylor
- Starring: Diana Barrymore; Brian Donlevy
- Cinematography: George Barnes
- Edited by: Frank Gross
- Music by: Frank Skinner
- Production company: Universal Pictures
- Distributed by: Universal Pictures
- Release date: November 13, 1942 (United States)
- Running time: 81 minutes
- Country: United States
- Language: English

Nightmare is a 1942 American film noir crime film directed by Tim Whelan and starring Diana Barrymore, Brian Donlevy and Henry Daniell. The film was based on a novel of the same name by Philip MacDonald.

== Plot ==
Leslie Stafford (Diana Barrymore) is a secretary who seeks the help of a home invader, Daniel Shane (Brian Donlevy), to dispose of the body of her murdered husband in wartime London.

== Cast ==
- Diana Barrymore as Leslie Stafford a.k.a. Butch
- Brian Donlevy as Daniel Shane
- Henry Daniell as Capt. Stafford
- Eustace Wyatt as Angus - Innkeeper
- Arthur Shields as Sergeant
- Gavin Muir as J.B. Abbington
- Stanley Logan as Inspector Robbins
- Ian Wolfe as James - Abbington's Butler
- Hans Conried as Hans - Nazi Agent
- John Abbott as Karl a.k.a. Charles
- David Clyde as Jock
- Elspeth Dudgeon as Angus' Wife
- Harold De Becker as Jeff Hawkins - London Cabby
- Ivan F. Simpson as Arnold - Money Changer
- Keith Hitchcock as London Bobby
- Arthur Gould-Porter as Freddie
- Anita Sharp-Bolster as Mrs. McDonald - Housekeeper
- Lydia Bilbrook as Mrs. Bates
- Pax Walker as Gladys
- Bobbie Hale as Old Gaffer (as Bobby Hale)
