= The Mystery of Mr. X =

1934 film by Edgar Selwyn

- Original theatrical poster
- Directed by: Edgar Selwyn; Richard Boleslawski (uncredited)
- Written by: Howard Emmett Rogers; Monckton Hoffe (additional dialogue)
- Based on: X v. Rex; 1933 novel by Philip MacDonald
- Produced by: Lawrence Weingarten
- Starring: Robert Montgomery; Elizabeth Allan; Lewis Stone
- Cinematography: Oliver T. Marsh
- Edited by: Hugh Wynn
- Production company: Metro-Goldwyn-Mayer
- Distributed by: Loew's Inc.
- Release date: February 23, 1934
- Running time: 84 minutes
- Country: United States
- Language: English

The Mystery of Mr. X is a 1934 American pre-Code crime film starring Robert Montgomery as a jewel thief who gets mixed up in a series of murders in London. It is based on the 1933 novel X v. Rex by Philip MacDonald (under the pen name Martin Porlock), was remade in 1952 as The Hour of 13.

== Plot ==
London police constables are being killed by a man calling himself "Mr. X". By chance, one of the murders occurs around the same time and place as a diamond robbery, leading Police Commissioner Sir Herbert Frensham to suspect the same man is responsible for both, much to the annoyance of the thief, Nicholas "Nick" Revel, and his confederates, taxi driver Joseph "Joe" Palmer and insurance clerk Hutchinson.

After another slaying, Sir Christopher Marche is arrested as a suspect, as he had drunkenly quarreled with the latest victim shortly before his death. However, Nick provides him with an alibi. As a result, he becomes acquainted with Marche's grateful fiancée (and the commissioner's daughter), Jane Frensham. The two are attracted to each other.

Meanwhile, Sir Herbert becomes convinced that Nick is Mr. X and puts him under constant surveillance. When the commissioner learns that his daughter has gone alone to Nick's flat, he sends Marche a message supposedly from Nick urgently requesting that they meet. When Marche finds the couple alone together, though they are not doing anything untoward, he breaks off his engagement with Jane.

Nick decides to give up his life of crime for Jane. He mails back the jewel. However, when Joe warns him that Hutchinson has been picked up for questioning, he realizes that it is only a matter of time before his associate gives him up. Nick discovers that the locations of the murders form an X, which provides him with the site of the next crime. He disguises himself as a policeman and flushes the real killer out. After a struggle, Mr. X is fatally injured, but before he dies, he boasts to Sir Herbert how close he came to fulfilling his goal of one murder for each of the 15 years he spent in prison.

== Cast ==
- Robert Montgomery as Nicholas Revel
- Elizabeth Allan as Jane Frensham
- Lewis Stone as Supt. Connor
- Ralph Forbes as Sir Christopher Marche
- Henry Stephenson as Sir Herbert Frensham
- Forrester Harvey as Joseph Horatio Palmer
- Ivan F. Simpson as Hutchinson
- Leonard Mudie as Mr. X
- Alec B. Francis as Judge Malpas
- Charles Irwin as Willis
- Claude King as Cummings
