= The Suspect (1944 film) =

1944 American film directed by Robert Siodmak

- Theatrical release poster
- Directed by: Robert Siodmak
- Screenplay by: Bertram Millhauser; Arthur T. Horman
- Based on: This Way Out; 1939 novel by James Ronald
- Produced by: Islin Auster
- Starring: Charles Laughton; Ella Raines; Dean Harens; Stanley C. Ridges; Henry Daniell; Rosalind Ivan; Keith Hitchcock
- Cinematography: Paul Ivano
- Edited by: Arthur Hilton
- Music by: Frank Skinner
- Color process: Black and white
- Production company: Universal Pictures
- Distributed by: Universal Pictures
- Release dates: December 22, 1944 (San Francisco); January 31, 1945 (New York City)
- Running time: 85 minutes
- Country: United States
- Language: English

The Suspect is a 1944 American film noir starring Charles Laughton and Ella Raines, and directed by Robert Siodmak. Set in Edwardian London in 1902, it is based on the 1939 novel This Way Out, by James Ronald, and was released by Universal Pictures.

== Plot ==
Philip Marshall (Charles Laughton) is a kind, henpecked manager who strikes up a friendship with Mary Gray (Ella Raines), a young stenographer who had approached him looking for work. He gradually finds himself falling in love with her, but keeps the relationship platonic.

Marshall's wife Cora (Rosalind Ivan), who has also alienated their son with her shrewish ways, discovers the affair; when Marshall asks her for a divorce, explaining that they would both be happier apart, Cora refuses and instead threatens a scandal. In order to protect Mary's reputation, Marshall breaks off their relationship and cuts all ties with her; despite his best efforts to reconcile with Cora, their marriage does not improve. Cora later dies after a fall down the stairs at home; it is strongly hinted that Marshall murdered her, although the death appears accidental.

Inspector Huxley (Stanley Ridges) of Scotland Yard suspects that Marshall murdered his wife but is unable to either prove it or establish a motive. Huxley follows Marshall, learning of Mary Gray, and interviews a number of the people in Marshall's neighborhood. When Huxley seeks to interview Mary directly, he is informed that she and Marshall were married earlier that day, making it impossible for Huxley to compel her to testify against her husband. Meanwhile, Marshall's drunken, wife-beating, spendthrift neighbor Gilbert Simmons (Henry Daniell) is interested to learn of the inspector's suspicions, and he relishes the chance to blackmail Marshall, whose respectability he envies. He threatens to invent a story about an argument between Marshall and his wife on the night of her death, which would substantiate that Marshall had killed his wife.

Marshall poisons his neighbor, using an overdose of anodyne drops from a bottle that Simmons' wife had shared with him. Marshall and Mary plan to move to Canada to follow Marshall's son, who has recently received a position there from his company. When the inspector hears of Simmons' death, he sets a trap in which he pretends to frame Mrs. Simmons for the murder. The success of the trap depends on Marshall's coming forward, rather than letting the innocent woman hang. The inspector believes that, in spite of everything, Marshall has never lost his innate decency. The film ends with Marshall's wife and son sailing to Canada while Marshall disembarks at the last moment, presumably preparing to turn himself in.

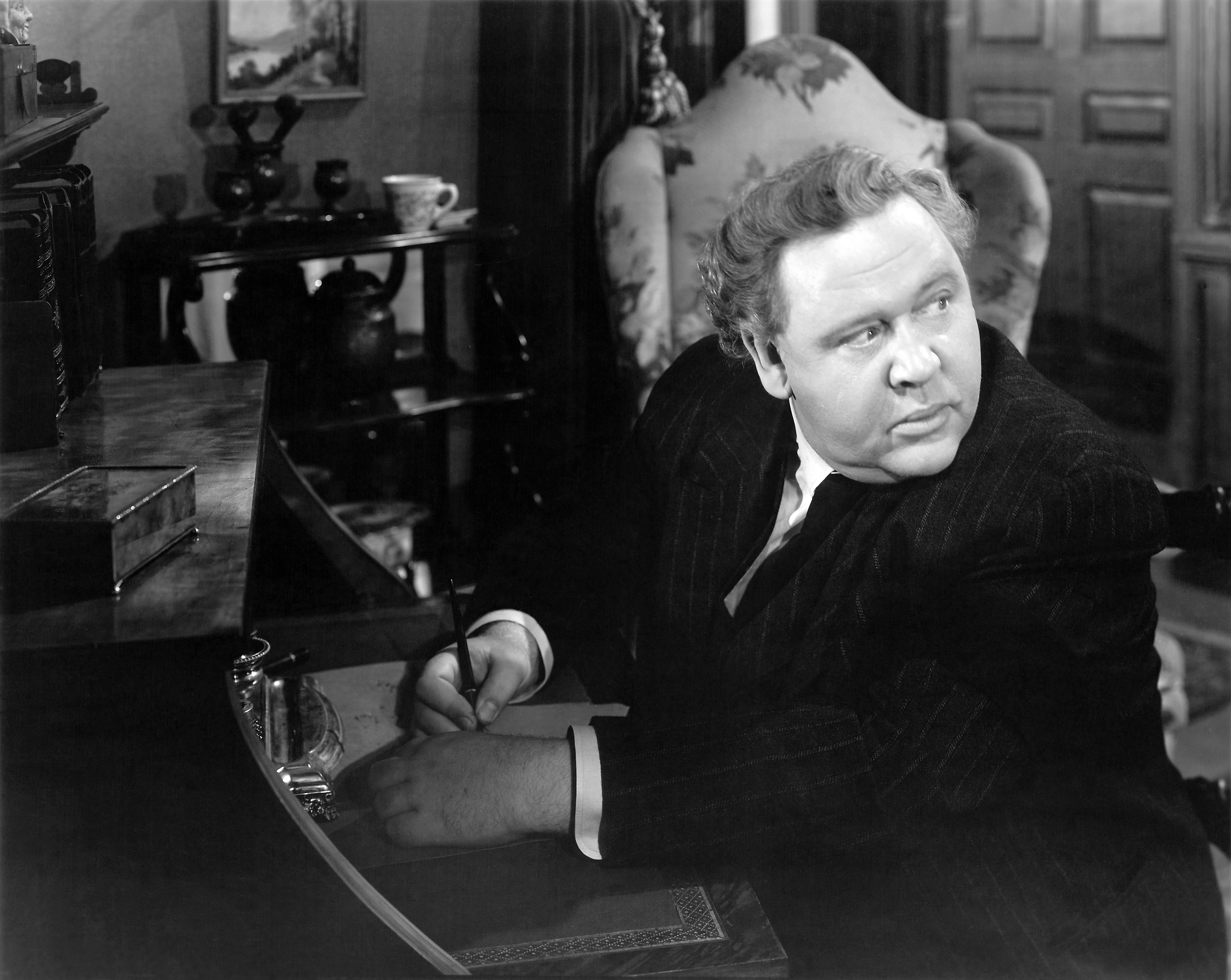
Charles Laughton in The Suspect

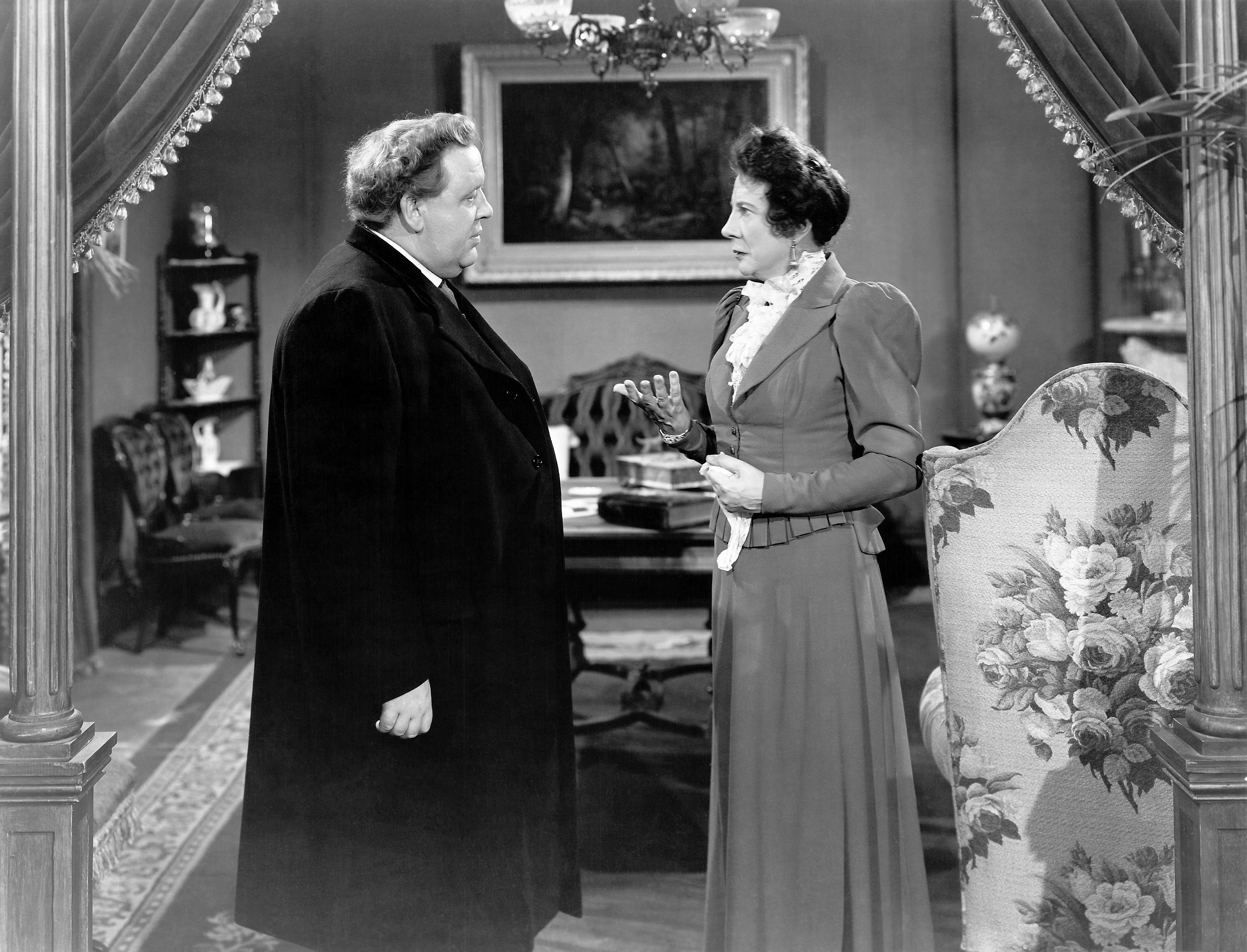
Charles Laughton and Rosalind Ivan

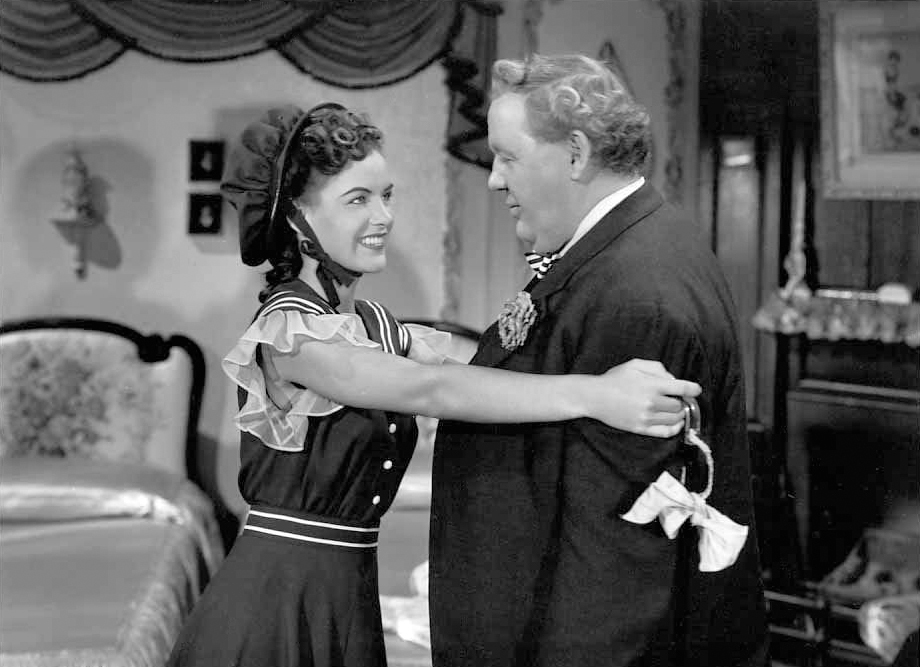
Ella Raines and Charles Laughton

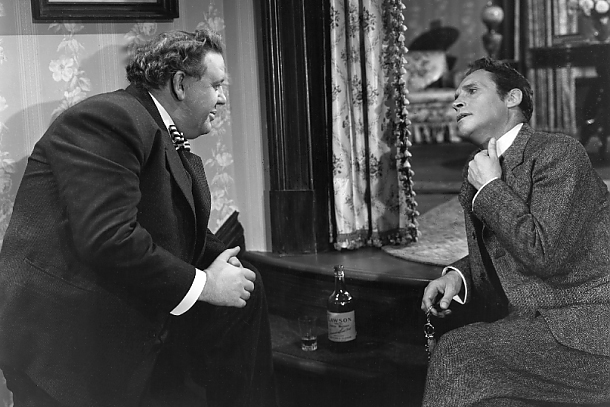
Charles Laughton and Henry Daniell

== Cast ==
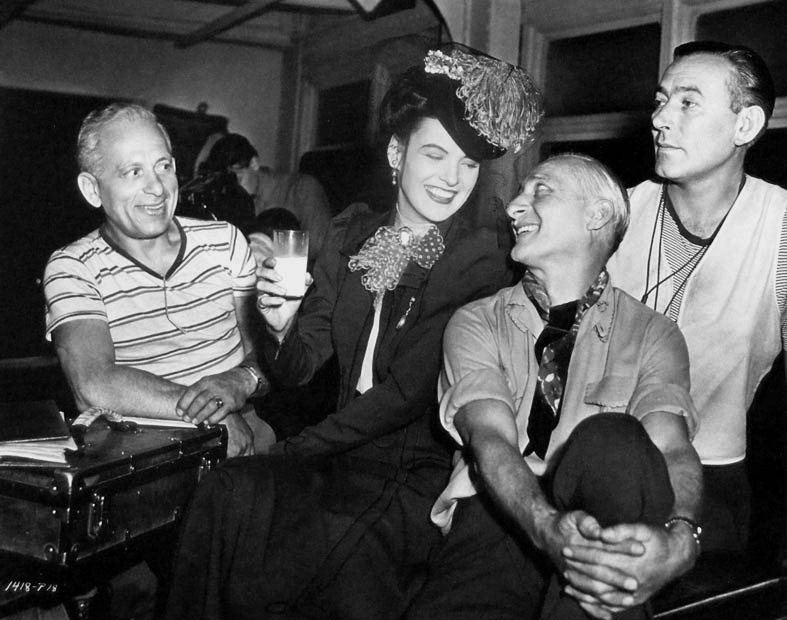
Ella Raines with camera assistants Robert Lazlo and Frank Heisler and cinematographer Paul Ivano on the set of The Suspect

- Charles Laughton as Philip Marshall
- Ella Raines as Mary Gray
- Dean Harens as John Marshall
- Stanley Ridges as Inspector Huxley
- Henry Daniell as Gilbert Simmons
- Rosalind Ivan as Cora Marshall
- Molly Lamont as Mrs. Edith Simmons
- Raymond Severn as Merridew
- Eve Amber as Sybil
- Maude Eburne as Mrs. Packer
- Clifford Brooke as Mr. Packer
- Gerald Hamer as Griswold (uncredited)
- Keith Hitchcock as Crummit (uncredited)
- Olaf Hytten as Mr. Jevne (uncredited)
- Jimmy Aubrey as Officer Payson (uncredited)

== Production ==
Siodmak said "we had the greatest difficulty finding anyone to act with" Laughton. In order to control the actor, he deliberately withheld the full script, opting instead to discuss each scene with him the night before filming. Additionally, Siodmak kept Laughton engaged on set by having him rehearse with the other actors, earning a reputation as "a brilliant director of actors." He was warned that halfway through a film Laughton traditionally had bouts of uncertainty. When this happened during filming, Siodmak would stage a prepared tantrum, which would then calm Laughton down, allowing the rest of the production to proceed without issue.

== Release ==
Following a world-premiere screening December 22, 1944, in San Francisco, The Suspect was released nationally on January 26, 1945. Universal's promotion of the film included a 30-minute transcribed radio dramatization in which Orson Welles played the role of Philip Marshall. The disc was recorded by WOR Recording, New York, and was heard on six New York radio stations January 29–30, 1945.

The Suspect was chosen to screen at the White House March 17, 1945, following a small formal dinner celebrating the 40th wedding anniversary of Eleanor Roosevelt and Franklin D. Roosevelt. Guests included Crown Princess Juliana of Holland.

== Reception ==
The New York Times film critic Bosley Crowther wrote, "Another study of an amiable, middle-aged fellow who commits murder out of desperation and his attempts at concealing his connection is being offered in The Suspect … The Suspect is by no means a dull picture, but it seems to lack that quality of excitement which in good melodrama keeps one on edge. In a word, it is too genteel. Henry Daniell, as the blackmailer, and Rosalind Ivan, as the exasperating spouse, are each splendid, and Ella Raines is most appealing as the second wife. It might be remarked, however, that her choice of a husband of Mr. Laughton's dimensions is a bit strange."

Variety magazine praised the film: "In Charles Laughton’s accomplished hands, this character becomes fascinating … There is less of the bluster and none of the villainy of Laughton’s previous vehicles. He gives an impeccable performance as the kindly, law-abiding citizen. Matching his deft portrayal is Ella Raines as the youthful steno he weds after his wife’s demise."

Motion Picture Magazine gave the film a glowing review, praising the writing, directing and acting, saying "Without mincing words, Arthur T. Horman's adaptation from James Ronald's novel, magnificently transcribed to the screen by Bertram Millhauser, brilliantly directed by Robert Siodmak, who draws from Charles Laughton what is undoubtedly one of the finest characterizations of the latter's career, all combine to make The Suspect a superb thriller."

In 2011, online film critic Dennis Schwartz gave the film a mixed review, writing that Siodmak "competently directs this theatrical studio-bound minor film noir, and keeps it more as a character study than as a whodunit. It builds on suspense, but never becomes that exciting or interesting. But it's well-acted, though the dreary story is never totally convincing or compelling."

== Adaptations ==
On April 9, 1945, The Lux Radio Theatre presented an hour-long adaptation of The Suspect, with Charles Laughton, Ella Raines, Rosalind Ivan, Denis Green, Lester Matthews and Eric Snowden.

Charles Bennett adapted The Suspect for the June 2, 1955, episode of NBC-TV's Lux Video Theatre. Directed by Buzz Kulik, the hour-long program starred Robert Newton (Philip Marshall), Toni Gerry (Mary Gray), John Hoyt (Huxley), Erin O'Brien-Moore (Cora Marshall), John Dehner (Gilbert Simmons) and Richard Lupino (John Marshall).
