= Top Secret Affair =

1957 film by H. C. Potter

- Spanish theatrical release poster
- Directed by: H. C. Potter
- Written by: Roland Kibbee; Allan Scott
- Based on: Melville Goodwin, U.S.A. 1951 novel by John P. Marquand
- Produced by: Martin Rackin; Milton Sperling
- Starring: Susan Hayward; Kirk Douglas; Paul Stewart
- Cinematography: Stanley Cortez
- Edited by: Folmar Blangsted
- Music by: Roy Webb
- Production company: Carrollton Inc.
- Distributed by: Warner Bros. Pictures
- Release date: January 30, 1957
- Running time: 100 minutes
- Country: United States
- Language: English

Top Secret Affair is a 1957 American romantic comedy film made by Carrollton Inc. and distributed by Warner Bros. Pictures that stars Susan Hayward and Kirk Douglas. It was directed by H. C. Potter and produced by Martin Rackin and Milton Sperling from a screenplay by Roland Kibbee and Allan Scott. (Carrollton Inc. was Hayward's own production company, named for her adopted hometown in Georgia.)

The story is very loosely adapted from the 1951 novel Melville Goodwin, U.S.A. by John P. Marquand, which had previously been adapted in 1952 for television's "Pulitzer Prize Playhouse." Hollywood avoided filming the novel for years because of its touchy subject matter: a married general's affair with a wealthy journalist. The screenwriters finally wound up rewriting the plot. The names of the two characters—Melville Goodwin and Dottie Peale—were retained, but both were made single. The film's credits state that it is "based on characters" in Marquand's book, rather than on the book itself.

The music score was by Roy Webb, the cinematography by Stanley Cortez and costume design by Charles LeMaire.

The film co-stars Paul Stewart and Jim Backus. The original leads were to be Humphrey Bogart and wife Lauren Bacall, and they were filmed doing a wardrobe test in 1956. But Bogart's illness forced his withdrawal from the project, and Bacall opted to remain at home to care for him until his death in 1957.

== Plot ==
Melville Goodwin (Kirk Douglas), a decorated U.S. Army general, is appointed chairman of the Joint Atomic International Commission by the President. But headstrong Dottie Peale (Susan Hayward), a high-powered media mogul, wants a close friend of her father's to get the position. So she plots to torpedo Goodwin's reputation. She invites him to her Long Island estate for an interview and photo session. Moreover, she assigns a cameraman to photograph Goodwin in compromising situations. However, every attempt to catch Goodwin off guard fails. Dottie even takes the general nightclubbing, hoping to get him drunk. Yet nothing works. Later, back in Long Island, Dottie, a little tipsy herself, falls off the diving board of her estate's swimming pool. Goodwin rescues her, and this leads to a night of romance.

Dottie's attitude is changed. She plans to marry Goodwin. But to her surprise, the general has no plans to continue the romance. He tells her about a love affair with a woman named Yvette to whom he revealed top-secret information during the Korean War. When he found out Yvette was an enemy spy, he ordered her shot. A rejected Dottie is now determined to ruin Goodwin. Her magazine's story, "Blabbermouth Goodwin", results in a Senate inquiry into his behavior. Unfortunately for the general, the Yvette spy case is still top secret, and he is forbidden to discuss it. It is only after the President's intervention that the story is declassified. Now Goodwin can defend his reputation and does so successfully. Goodwin is publicly cleared of wrongdoing and recognized as a bigger hero than ever. In front of a gaggle of Washington reporters, he drags a protesting but obviously willing Dottie into a waiting car, signaling that their romance is on again.

== Cast ==
- Susan Hayward as Dorothy "Dottie" Peale
- Kirk Douglas as Maj. Gen. Melville A. Goodwin
- Paul Stewart as Phil Bentley, Dottie's assistant and conscience
- Jim Backus as Col. Homer W. Gooch, Goodwin's Public Information Officer
- John Cromwell as General Daniel A. Grimshaw, Goodwin's commanding officer
- Roland Winters as Sen. Burdick
- Arthur Gould-Porter as Holmes, Dottie's butler
- Michael Fox as Reporter Laszlo "Lotzie" Kovach
- Frank Gerstle as Sgt. Kruger
- Charles Lane as Bill Hadley
- Ivan Triesault as the German field marshal (uncredited)

== Reception ==
Susan Hayward later said the film was "very good – but nobody went to see it."
