= Gerald Hamer =

British actor (1886–1972)

Gerald Hamer (16 November 1886 – 6 July 1972) was a British actor, born at Llandudno, Wales as Geoffrey Earl Watton to John Watton and Evelyn Clara (née Earl).

Hamer worked in the United States, where he played primarily British characters in Hollywood films. He made a number of appearances in the Basil Rathbone series of Sherlock Holmes films in a variety of different roles.

== Selected filmography ==
- Three Witnesses (1935) - (uncredited)
- Swing Time (1936) - Eric Lacanistram (uncredited)
- Angel (1937) - Barker's Footman (uncredited)
- Blond Cheat (1938) - Waiter
- Sweethearts (1938) - Harry (uncredited)
- The Saint Strikes Back (1939) - Val's Butler (uncredited)
- Bulldog Drummond's Bride (1939) - Garvey
- The Light That Failed (1939) - Soldier (uncredited)
- This Above All (1942) - Porter (uncredited)
- Sherlock Holmes in Washington (1943) - Alfred Pettibone a.k.a. John Grayson (uncredited)
- Sherlock Holmes Faces Death (1943) - Langford
- The Lodger (1944) - Milkman (uncredited)
- The White Cliffs of Dover (1944) - Private (uncredited)
- The Scarlet Claw (1944) - Potts, Tanner, Ramson
- Enter Arsene Lupin (1944) - Doc Marling
- Hi, Beautiful (1944) - One of Bearded Twins (uncredited)
- The Suspect (1944) - Griswold (uncredited)
- Pursuit to Algiers (1945) - Kingston
- Confidential Agent (1945) - Waiter (uncredited)
- Terror by Night (1946) - Alfred Shallcross (uncredited)
- Ivy (1947) - Man from Paris Office (uncredited)
- Lured (1947) - Harry Milton (uncredited)
- The Sign of the Ram (1948) - Vicar Woolton (uncredited)
- The Secret of St. Ives (1949) - Hudson - the Footman (uncredited)
- Challenge to Lassie (1949) - Diner (uncredited)
- Lorna Doone (1951) - Doctor (uncredited)
- Gaby (1956) - Newsboy (uncredited)
- Alfred Hitchcock Presents (1956) (Season 1 Episode 23: "Back from Christmas") - Mr. Hewitt
- Alfred Hitchcock Presents (1957) (Season 2 Episode 32: "The Hands of Mr. Ottermole") - Jimmy the Blindman
- Susan Slade (1961) - White's Butler (uncredited)
