= The List of Adrian Messenger =

1963 film by John Huston

- Theatrical poster.
- Directed by: John Huston
- Screenplay by: Anthony Veiller
- Based on: The List of Adrian Messenger; 1959 novel by Philip MacDonald
- Produced by: Edward Lewis
- Starring: George C. Scott; Dana Wynter; Clive Brook; Gladys Cooper; Herbert Marshall; Marcel Dalio; Jacques Roux; Tony Curtis; Kirk Douglas; Burt Lancaster; Robert Mitchum; Frank Sinatra
- Cinematography: Joseph MacDonald (as Joe MacDonald)
- Edited by: Terry O. Morse; Hugh S. Fowler
- Music by: Jerry Goldsmith
- Production company: Joel Productions
- Distributed by: Universal Pictures
- Release date: May 29, 1963 (New York City)
- Running time: 98 minutes
- Country: United States
- Language: English
- Box office: $1,700,000 (US/ Canada)

The List of Adrian Messenger is a 1963 American mystery film directed by John Huston starring Kirk Douglas, George C. Scott, Dana Wynter, Clive Brook, Gladys Cooper and Herbert Marshall. It is based on a 1959 novel of the same name written by Philip MacDonald. The screenplay went through several drafts.Vertigo co-writer Alec Coppel wrote one. Anthony Veiller wrote the final draft and receives sole screen credit.

== Plot ==
Writer Adrian Messenger believes a series of seemingly unrelated "accidental" deaths are linked murders. He asks his friend Anthony Gethryn, recently retired from MI5, to investigate, and provides a list of the victims' names. Soon after, Messenger's plane is bombed and crashes into the sea while he is en route to collect evidence to confirm his suspicions. With his dying breath, he tells a fellow passenger, Raoul Le Borg, the key to the mystery, though his exact meaning is garbled.

Raoul Le Borg survives and turns out to be Gethryn's old World War II counterpart in the French Resistance. They join forces to investigate Messenger's list and decode his cryptic final words. Lady Jocelyn Bruttenholm, Messenger's widowed cousin and a former love interest of Gethryn, soon joins them. Raoul Le Borg becomes strongly attracted to Jocelyn.

The first conclusion Gethryn and Le Borg draw from Messenger's dying words is about important information contained in his unpublished manuscript regarding his war experiences. They go to Adrian's apartment, but the murderer has already been there and taken and re-typed several pages, removing key information. He happened to encounter Jocelyn as he was leaving, then went to murder the typist. After inspecting the manuscript, Gethryn spots the retyped page. Jocelyn's description of the man in the apartment differs from Le Borg's, who saw the murderer at the airport. From this, Gethryn determines that the killer wears realistic masks to disguise his appearance.

Next, Gethryn and Le Borg go to visit the only living person on the list, James Slattery. When they arrive, they meet James' invalid twin brother, Joe Slattery, who tells them James died of a heart attack several years earlier. They leave disappointed, assuming everyone on the list is dead. That night, however, Joe sees and recognizes the masked murderer, who pursues him, knocks him out and pushes him into the river, drowning him. The following day, his mother tells Gethryn that “Joe” was actually James. It was Joe who died, and James had switched identities with him so that Joe's disability pension would continue.

From James' mother, and from the widow of another person of the list, Gethryn and Le Borg establish that all were in the same prisoner-of-war camp in Burma. A Canadian sergeant betrayed his fellow prisoners, foiling their escape attempt. They conclude the Canadian is the murderer, and killed each person on the list to prevent them from identifying him. They deduce that he is about to come into prominence and cannot risk being recognized. Almost by accident, Messenger's final clue falls into place; it is revealed that the Canadian stands in line to an inheritance of the Bruttenholms (pronounced "Brooms"), Jocelyn's family of landed gentry, who avidly engage in fox hunting.

Having killed all possible witnesses to his wartime treachery, the Canadian, George Brougham (pronounced 'Broom'), appears at a Bruttenholm estate fox hunt and introduces himself as a member of the family (George has previously been seen only in disguise). It becomes clear to Gethryn and Le Borg that Brougham's next victim is Jocelyn's son, Derek, who comes before Brougham in inheriting the family title and estate. In an attempt to divert Brougham, Gethryn informs him of his investigation of Messenger's list, calculating to set himself up as George's next victim.

That night, Brougham, who leaves for a phony meeting in London, sabotages the next morning's hunt by laying a drag over the fields. He marks a blind spot behind a high wall, and positions a hay tedder where Gethryn (who has the honor of leading the hunt) will be impaled upon its lethal tines. Early the next morning, a farmer repositions the tedder. The hunt comes to a halt at the specified spot. Gethryn reveals to the gathered crowd that he discovered and removed the hay-tedder booby trap earlier that morning and, with the help of the lead fox hound, will detect the scent of the culprit in a group protesting against the hunt. Brougham, once again disguised, is identified and mounts Derek's horse, which was a gift from Messenger to Derek and trained by Romanian gypsies, to escape. However, Derek shouts a command in Romanian, and the horse stops short, throwing Brougham and impaling him on the machine he intended for Gethryn.

== Cast ==
- George C. Scott as Anthony Gethryn
- John Merivale as Adrian Messenger
- Jacques Roux as Raoul Le Borg
- Clive Brook as Marquis of Gleneyre
- Dana Wynter as Lady Jocelyn Bruttenholm
- Tony Huston as Derek Bruttenholm
- Kirk Douglas as George Brougham / Mr. Pythian
- Gladys Cooper as Mrs. Karoudjian
- Herbert Marshall as Sir Willfrid Lucas
- Marcel Dalio as Max Karoudjian
- Bernard Archard as Insp. Pike
- Ronald Long as Carstairs
- Tony Curtis as Organ Grinder
- Robert Mitchum as James Slattery/Joe Slattery
- Frank Sinatra as Gypsy
- Burt Lancaster as Protestor
- Bernard Fox as Lynch (uncredited)
- John Huston as Lord Ashton (uncredited)

== Reception ==
The film holds a 64% rating on Rotten Tomatoes, based on 14 reviews.

== Film's use of disguise ==
The List of Adrian Messenger is a relatively modern Golden Age type of mystery with an additional gimmick that was featured prominently in its advertising. A number of famous Hollywood actors were advertised to appear in the film heavily disguised in make-up designed by John Chambers: Tony Curtis, Kirk Douglas, Burt Lancaster, Frank Sinatra, and Robert Mitchum. During an epilogue the stars appear on-camera removing their disguises and revealing their identity. Curtis is revealed to have portrayed a street organ player; Lancaster removes the disguise of a female fox-hunt protester; Sinatra doffs the make-up of a gypsy horse-trader; Mitchum removes his disguise as the victim James Slattery; and Douglas sheds one of his make-ups at the close of a montage of several of the killer George Brougham's personas.

In actuality, only Curtis, Mitchum, and Douglas performed in the body of the film. Lancaster and Sinatra only appear during the unmasking coda; their parts were portrayed by uncredited performers. Similarly, several of Douglas’ character's disguised personas were performed instead by character actor Jan Merlin, who was hired in secret and labored with the Universal make-up artists for nearly a year before shooting began, under sometimes painful conditions and with no attribution. Merlin later incorporated his experiences working on this production into a thriller novel, Shooting Montezuma (ISBN 1-4010-2823-3).

Elizabeth Taylor was scheduled to be one of the guest stars hidden under make-up in a disguised role-- a sailor called "Chesty.". She demurred after word was conveyed to her about the grueling process that applying and removing the disguise would involve.

== Accolades ==
The film is recognized by American Film Institute in these lists:

- 2008: AFI's 10 Top 10:
  - Nominated Mystery Film

== Home media ==
The List of Adrian Messenger was released on Region 1 DVD by Universal in 2009 as part of their print-on-demand "Vault Series." It was later included in Universal's 2016 DVD box-set Kirk Douglas: The Centennial Collection. It is also available on an Australian PAL DVD distributed by Umbrella Entertainment. An original soundtrack recording of the Jerry Goldsmith score was released in 2014 by Varèse Sarabande.

== In popular culture ==
- Beyond Our Ken played on the title of Messenger in its "film worth remembering, which is more than can he said for the next half hour" at the start of the fourth episode in the seventh series, first broadcast on 15 December 1963.
- In 1970, the series Get Smart featured a parody of the film titled "The Mess of Adrian Listenger" starring Pat Paulsen in which secret agents named on a list are methodically eliminated. The episode title itself is an anagram of the movie title.

== See also ==
- John Huston filmography
