= The Rasp (novel) =

1924 novel by Philip MacDonald

- First edition (UK)
- Author: Philip MacDonald
- Language: English
- Series: Anthony Gethryn mysteries
- Genre: Mystery novel / Whodunnit
- Publisher: Collins (UK, 1924); Dial Press (USA, 1925)
- Publication date: 1924
- Publication place: United Kingdom
- Media type: Print
- OCLC: 10207126
- Followed by: The White Crow (1928, the next Gethryn novel)

The Rasp is a whodunit mystery novel by Philip MacDonald. It was published in 1924 and introduces his series character, detective Colonel Anthony Gethryn. It is set in a country house in rural England.

== Plot summary ==
Anthony Gethryn, ex-secret service agent, is an occasional "special correspondent" for a weekly newspaper and is assigned to cover the story when a cabinet minister, John Hoode, is found murdered in the library at his country house, battered to death with a wood-rasp. Gethryn recalls his acquaintance with a member of the household and is thus invited to investigate the crime as a kind of "friend of the family". It soon seems as though everyone concerned has a cast-iron alibi for the time of the crime, but Gethryn comes up with an imaginative way for the murderer to have accomplished the deed and established an alibi, and reveals the murderer.

== Literary significance & criticism ==
Anthony Gethryn is an early example of the amateur detective, soon to become popular in detective fiction. The focus on the breaking of an elaborate alibi is similar to the work of Freeman Wills Crofts, MacDonald's contemporary. "The story is the conventional body-in-the-study, with a fair amount of obvious detection. ... The killer's fakery is plain from the start. Despite all this, it has several times been declared "a classic" and "epochmaking" by students of the genre."

== Film ==
In 1931 Michael Powell directed a film based on the novel, which is now believed lost.
