= Reactive aldehyde species =

Class of chemical compounds

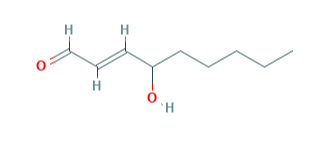
4-hydroxynonenal, a common disease-associated pro-inflammatory RASP

Reactive aldehyde species (RASP), also known as reactive aldehydes, refer to a class of electrophilic organic aldehyde molecules that are generally toxic or facilitate inflammation. RASP covalently react with amine groups (via Schiff base formation) and thiol groups (via Michael addition), particularly in proteins. Following threshold amounts of binding to the electrophile-responsive proteome, RASP modify protein function, as has been described with MAP kinase, protein kinase C, and other proteins that potentiate cytokine release and other aspects of inflammation. Binding of RASP to proteins can also lead to NF-kB activation, autoantibody formation, inflammasome activation, and activation of Scavenger Receptor A. RASP are formed via a variety of processes, including oxidation of alcohols, polyamine metabolism and lipid peroxidation. In addition to binding to proteins and other amine or thiol-containing molecules such as glutathione, RASP are metabolized by aldehyde dehydrogenases or aldehyde reductases. Due to the toxicity of RASP, only a small number of genetic mutations in aldehyde dehydrogenases allow for viable offspring, resulting in Sjögren-Larsson Syndrome, Succinic Semi-Aldehyde Dehydrogenase Deficiency, and other rare diseases.

The two most commonly reported disease-associated pro-inflammatory RASP are malondialdehyde and 4-hydroxynonenal, although many others, including acrolein, crotonaldehyde, acetaldehyde, and hexanal, have been described. The toxicity of RASP include mutagenicity, aggregate formation, and generalized cytotoxicity.

Malondialdehyde, for example, has been associated with many inflammatory and autoimmune diseases, including asthma, psoriasis, and dry eye disease. Only two RASP, retinaldehyde and pyridoxal (or pyridoxal phosphate), appear to effect essential non-inflammatory physiologic functions in animals, though retinaldehyde is highly dependent on protein chaperones to prevent toxicity.

In clinical trials, the RASP inhibitor reproxalap was shown to mitigate inflammation in patients with noninfectious anterior uveitis, dry eye disease and allergic conjunctivitis.
