= The Rasp (film) =

1931 British film by Michael Powell

- Frame from the film
- Directed by: Michael Powell
- Written by: Philip MacDonald
- Produced by: Jerome Jackson
- Starring: Claude Horton, Phyllis Loring, C. M. Hallard, James Raglan,
- Cinematography: Geoffrey Faithfull
- Distributed by: Film Engineering, Fox
- Release date: 1931
- Running time: 44 minutes
- Country: United Kingdom
- Language: English

The Rasp is a lost 1931 British drama film directed by Michael Powell and starring Claude Horton, Phyllis Loring, C. M. Hallard and James Raglan. It was written by Philip MacDonald based on his 1924 novel of the same title.

== Preservation status ==
The British Film Institute has classed The Rasp as a lost film. Its National Archive holds a collection of stills but no film or video materials.

== Plot ==
Cabinet Minister John Hoode has been mordered, and young newspaper reporter Anthony Gethryn is seeking an exclusive story. Scotland Yard plans to arrest Alan Deacon, Hoode's secretary, but Gethryn believes Deacon to be innocent. He is able to prove that the murderer is Hoode's business rival Sir Arthur Digby-Coates. He gets his story.

== Cast ==
- Claude Horton as Anthony Gethryn
- Phyllis Loring as Lucia Masterson
- C. M. Hallard as Sir Arthur Digby-Coates
- James Raglan as Alan Deacon
- Thomas Weguelin as Insp Boyd
- Carol Coombe as Dora Masterson
- Leonard Brett as Jimmy Masterson

== Reception ==
Kine Weekly wrote: "Unpretentious murder mystery drama, the outstanding feature of which is the picturesque English countryside settings. The story is not told with a great deal of conviction, suspense is slight, and the individual acting is only moderate. ... Claude Horton plays Gethryn with more energy than conviction; C. M. Mallard cannot conceal the fact for long that he is the murderer, and Phyllis Loring and Carol Coombe are very stagey as the girls in the case. The best performance comes from Thomas Weguelin as the inspector. ... In tackling a murder mystery drama, in which a newspaper man is involved, Michael Powell, the director, has butted in on America's favourite theme, and this effort, although moderately good, suffers in comparison. However, the atmosphere is refreshingly English, and there remains sufficient to entertain the unsophisticated."

The Bioscope wrote: "Just another murder mystery ... and while there is a certain amount of mystery as to the perpetrator of the deed, the events which lead up to the solution and the arrest of the culprit are such as to convince only the more easily interested patron."

The Daily Film Renter wrote: "Quota offering, with few redeeming features. A murder mystery, but its unfolding by an ineffective 'Fleet Street man' fails to grip. Actually it suffers from too much unfolding, and there are weaknesses in dialogue, construction, and continuity which a weak cast is unable to conceal. Only for very easily pleased audiences."

Film Weekly wrote: "This concentrated little drama tries to compress the telling of a rather complicated detective story into about forty-five minutes, and does it quite well on the whole. ... The acting is barely up to standard, Claude Horton appearing very self-conscious as the central character. The seftings are just passable, but the photography and make-up (particularly of the feminine players) leave something to be desired. In America The Rasp would be called a 'quickie,' and as 'quickies' go it is a fairly good little talkie, which should at last hold your interest for three quarters of an hour."
