= The Noose (novel) =

1930 novel

- Author: Philip MacDonald
- Language: English
- Series: Anthony Gethryn
- Genre: Detective
- Publisher: Collins Crime Club
- Publication date: 1930
- Publication place: United Kingdom
- Media type: Print
- Preceded by: The Link
- Followed by: The Choice

The Noose is a 1930 detective novel by the British writer Philip MacDonald. It is part of his series featuring Anthony Gethryn, one of the numerous investigators of the Golden Age of Detective Fiction. It was published in London by the Collins Crime Club and in New York by The Dial Press. It was the first in the Collins Crime Club series to feature the iconic hooded gunman logo.

== Synopsis ==
At the last minute Gethryn is persuaded to take up a case after the plea of the wife of a man about to be hanged for murder. Urged on by his wife, Gethryn heads out to the countryside where the killing has taken place. With only a couple of days before the execution is due to take place, he races against the clock to save a man from the noose.

== Bibliography ==
- Barnes, Melvyn P. Murder in Print: A Guide to Two Centuries of Crime Fiction. Barn Owl Books, 1986.
- Barzun, Jacques & Taylor, Wendell Hertig. A Catalogue of Crime. Harper & Row, 1989.
- Curran, John. Agatha Christie’s Murder in the Making: Stories and Secrets from Her Archive. HarperCollins, 2011.
- Hubin, Allen J. Crime Fiction, 1749-1980: A Comprehensive Bibliography. Garland Publishing, 1984.
- Reilly, John M. Twentieth Century Crime & Mystery Writers. Springer, 2015.
