= The Nursemaid Who Disappeared =

1939 film by Arthur B. Woods

- Lesley Brook and Peter Coke in the film
- Directed by: Arthur B. Woods
- Screenplay by: Connery Chappell; Paul Gangelin
- Based on: novel The Nursemaid Who Disappeared by Philip Macdonald
- Produced by: Jerome Jackson (executive producer)
- Starring: Arthur Margetson; Peter Coke; Lesley Brook
- Cinematography: Basil Emmott
- Edited by: Leslie Norman (uncredited)
- Production company: Warner Brothers-First National Productions
- Distributed by: Warner Bros. (UK)
- Release date: March 1939 (UK)
- Running time: 86 minutes
- Country: United Kingdom
- Language: English

The Nursemaid Who Disappeared is a 1939 British crime film directed by Arthur B. Woods and starring Ronald Shiner, Ian Fleming, Arthur Margetson, Peter Coke and Edward Chapman. It was written by Connery Chappell and Paul Gangelin based on the 1938 novel by Philip MacDonald, and was produced by Warner Brothers–First National Productions.

== Plot ==
A playwright overhears a gang of men plotting a kidnapping and enlists the assistance of a detective to investigate them. They soon find that the ring is fronted by a bogus employment agency that sends "clients" to scope potential victims.

== Cast ==
- Arthur Margetson as Det. Antony Gethryn
- Peter Coke as Tom Sheldon
- Lesley Brook as Avis Bellingham
- Edward Chapman as Jenks
- Coral Browne as Mabel Barnes
- Joyce Kennedy as Lucia Gethryn
- Dorice Fordred as Janet Murch
- Martita Hunt as Lady Ballister
- Marion Gerth as Ada Brent
- Ian McLean as Inspector Pike
- Ian Fleming as Sir Egbert Lucas
- Eliot Makeham as Mr. Hines
- Ronald Shiner as Detective Smith (uncredited)

== Reception ==
The Monthly Film Bulletin wrote: "This ingenious and suspenseful story has been cleverly adapted and most efficiently directed. Interest is held from beginning to end. Admirable team-work on the part of the cast, and careful attention to atmosphere and correct detail are mainly responsible for this satisfactory result. ... Arthur Margetson makes a competent Anthony Gethryn. He impresses as a clever detective, though perhaps lacking in the charm which distinguishes the hero of the book. Peter Coke is good as Tom, and the supporting players give of their best."

Kine Weekly wrote: "Here we have a first-class example of popular crime fiction. The round-up of a ruthless gang of kidnappers is the kernel of the ingeniously planned plot, and fundamentals, suspense and excitement commingle in arresting order. The climax is terrific. Convincing characterisation and ambitious staging consolidate mass appeal. Excellent general booking."

The Daily Film Renter wrote: "Well acted, and interestingly staged melodrama of excellent popular calibre,"

Picturegoer wrote: "Arthur Margetson scores by his cool, easy manner as a private detective who tracks down the criminals in a smashing climax. Other good performances come from Peter Coke as a playwright whose overhearing of a kidnapping plot leads to adventure, and Leslie Brooks is good as his fiancee. The master crook is well characterized by Edward Chapman."
