= Rosalind Ivan =

20th-century English stage and film character actress

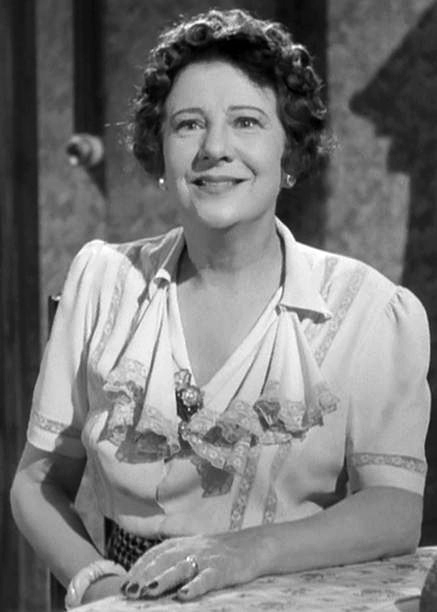
- Rosalind Ivan (1945).
- Born: Rosalind Muriel Pringle; 27 November 1880; London, England
- Died: 6 April 1959 (aged 78); New York, New York, U.S.
- Other name: Rosalind Johnson
- Occupation: Actress
- Years active: 1944–54

Rosalind Ivan (27 November 1880 – 6 April 1959) was an English stage and film character actress. Ivan appeared in fourteen American films from 1944 to 1954.

Rosalind Muriel Pringle was the daughter of Stamford and Annie Pringle, who married in 1876 and divorced in 1881. In 1883, her mother married Charles Johnson and her daughter took his surname. By age ten, Ivan was performing as a concert pianist in England, but financial problems with her family caused her to cease studying piano when she was sixteen.

On the London stage, she had the role of "Retty" in Tess (1900). She joined Sir Henry Irving's distinguished company and in America appeared as Mme. Thalhouet in Madame Sans Gene (1902). Ivan's first Broadway appearance was in The Master Builder (1907); her last was in The Corn Is Green (1940). One of her triumphs on the stage was as the "vampire" in A Fool There Was (1913).

Ivan had a memorable role as the nagging wife of a bank teller (Edward G. Robinson) in Fritz Lang's film Scarlet Street (1945). That role, along with a similar "nagging wife" role (of Charles Laughton) in Robert Siodmak's The Suspect (1944), caused some in Hollywood to dub her "Ivan the Terrible". She also appeared in 20th Century Fox's Biblical epic The Robe. She appeared with Sydney Greenstreet and Peter Lorre in The Verdict (1946), as Mrs. Benson, Lorre's comical landlady. The actress gained most of her fame on the Broadway and London stages.

On 6 April 1959, Ivan was found dead in her hotel room in New York City. She was 78 years old. Police attributed her death to natural causes.

== Partial filmography ==
- Arms and the Woman (1916)
- It Started With Eve (1941)
- The Suspect (1944)
- Scarlet Street (1945)
- Pursuit to Algiers (1945)
- The Corn is Green (1945)
- Alias Mr. Twilight (1946)
- Johnny Belinda (1948)
- The Robe (1953)
- Elephant Walk (1954) as Mrs. Lakin
