= Sherlock Holmes Faces Death =

1943 film by Roy William Neill

- 1943 US Theatrical Poster
- Directed by: Roy William Neill
- Written by: Bertram Millhauser
- Based on: "The Adventure of the Musgrave Ritual" by Sir Arthur Conan Doyle
- Produced by: Roy William Neill
- Starring: Basil Rathbone; Nigel Bruce
- Cinematography: Charles Van Enger
- Edited by: Fred R. Feitshans Jr.
- Music by: H. J. Salter
- Distributed by: Universal Pictures
- Release date: September 17, 1943
- Running time: 68 minutes
- Country: United States
- Language: English

Sherlock Holmes Faces Death is the sixth film in the Basil Rathbone/Nigel Bruce series of Sherlock Holmes films. Made in 1943, it is a loose adaptation of Sir Arthur Conan Doyle's 1893 Holmes short story "The Adventure of the Musgrave Ritual". Its three immediate predecessors in the film series were World War II spy adventures with Holmes and Dr. Watson helping the Allies thwart enemy agents, but this one marked a return to the pure mystery film form. Though several characters are military men and there are frequent mentions of the ongoing war, it is not the focus of the story.

This was the second of three Holmes films in which Basil Rathbone, Nigel Bruce and Hillary Brooke appeared together. The first was Sherlock Holmes and the Voice of Terror in 1942 and the third was The Woman in Green in 1945.

== Plot ==
Dr. Watson is working as resident physician at Musgrave Manor in Northumberland, a stately home which is also used as a hospital for a number of servicemen suffering from shell shock.

When Sally Musgrave displays her feelings for one of the wounded American fighter pilots, Captain Pat Vickery, who is currently recovering at the family estate, her brothers Geoffrey and Phillip are quick to show their dismay.

One of the physicians working at the estate, Dr. Sexton, is assaulted by an unknown assailant when out on a walk. Watson, who is in charge of the medical facility, goes to fetch his dear friend Sherlock Holmes to bring some clarity to the case of the attack.

Upon his arrival at the estate, Holmes discovers the dead body of one of the brothers, Geoffrey. Inspector Lestrade of Scotland Yard is put on the case to solve the murder and immediately arrests the American captain as a suspect.

Holmes is of another opinion about the flyer's guilt and continues to investigate on his own. Phillip is formally made the new head of the estate the next day with the aid of his sister. But after only one day of running the estate, Phillip, too, is found murdered, lying in the trunk of the car.

Lestrade suspects the family butler, Alfred Brunton, to be the murderer because Phillip had just fired him. Trying to arrest the butler, Lestrade becomes lost in the manor's secret passageways. Meanwhile, Holmes and Watson look into the special "Musgrave Ritual" that the family uses to appoint the new head of the family. They find the words used in the ritual hidden in Sally's room and try to copy the ritual, which involves replaying a giant chess game on the checkered floor of the house's main hall. As pieces in the game they use the household staff and servicemen.

The game gives them clues to the family's secret burial crypt underneath the house, and there they find Brunton murdered, clutching a case containing an old document. Holmes examines the body for clues and sets a trap for the murderer. After the others have retired for the night, Holmes sneaks back into the crypt and waits for the murderer to reappear. Before long, Sexton appears, and Holmes confronts him with the evidence that he has found and observed throughout the investigation. Sexton, however, manages to overpower Holmes and takes his revolver. Sexton confesses that he indeed is the one responsible for the murders. He shoots at Holmes with what turn out to be blank cartridges. When Sexton emerges from the crypt, Lestrade and Watson are there waiting to arrest him.

Explaining the meaning of the document found in the crypt to Sally, Holmes suggests that Sexton had discovered an old land grant that entitled the Musgraves to a fortune of millions of pounds, and had hatched a deadly scheme to gain it for himself. The devious doctor had killed both brothers, making Sally heir to the money, and then sought to claim her as his bride by framing her sweetheart, Vickery, for the slayings. Learning of this, Sally destroys the document that would have made her rich, not wanting to profit at the cost of others' lives.

Driving away with Watson, Holmes muses on Sally's selfless act, "There's a new spirit abroad in the land. The old days of grab and greed are on their way out. We're beginning to think of what we owe the other fellow, not just what we're compelled to give him. The time's coming, Watson, when we shan't be able to fill our bellies in comfort while other folk go hungry, or sleep in warm beds while others shiver in the cold; when we shan't be able to kneel and thank God for blessings before our shining altars while men anywhere are kneeling in either physical or spiritual subjection.... And God willing, we'll live to see that day, Watson."

== Cast ==
- Basil Rathbone as Sherlock Holmes
- Nigel Bruce as Dr. John Watson
- Dennis Hoey as Inspector Lestrade
- Arthur Margetson as Dr. Bob Sexton
- Hillary Brooke as Sally Musgrave
- Halliwell Hobbes as Alfred Brunton
- Minna Phillips as Mrs. Howells
- Milburn Stone as Captain Vickery
- Frederick Worlock as Geoffrey Musgrave
- Gavin Muir as Phillip Musgrave
- Gerald Hamer as Major Langford
- Vernon Downing as Lt. Clavering
- Olaf Hytten as Captain MacIntosh
- Charles Coleman as Constable Kray
- Dick Rush as Constable
- Mary Gordon as Mrs. Hudson
- Peter Lawford as Customer in Public House (uncredited)
- Norma Varden as Gracie the barmaid (uncredited)

== See also ==
- Sherlock Holmes (1939 film series)
- Adaptations of Sherlock Holmes in film
