= Arthur Margetson =

British actor (1887–1951)

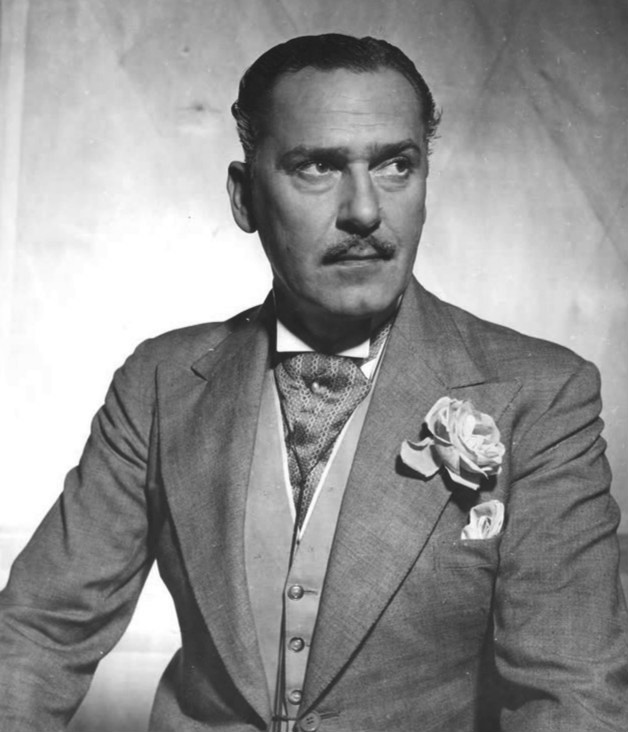
- Margetson as Phileas Fogg in the 1946 musical extravaganza Around the World
- Born: Arthur Charles Margetson; 27 April 1887; Marylebone, England
- Died: 13 August 1951 (aged 64); Central Middlesex Hospital, England
- Occupation(s): Actor, composer and impersonator
- Years active: 1917–1949 on stage 1930–1943 on screen
- Spouses: Rosamond Bertram Ifould (née Hobson) in 1923; Vera Alys Lennox in 1926; Shirley Grey (born Agnes Evangeline Zetterstrand) in 1936; Barbara Joyce Wood in 1948

Arthur Margetson (27 April 1887 – 13 August 1951) was a British stage and film actor and radio broadcaster. He was also a composer of music and lyrics, and an impersonator of performers such as G P Huntley, Alfred Lester, and Harry Weldon.

Arthur Charles Margetson was born in Marylebone, the younger son of Edward John Margetson, a composer, and Marion Stocqueler Wardroper. His mother was a daughter of an adulterous affair between Joachim Hayward Stocqueler and Mrs Louisa Marianne Wardroper (née Hillyard). Arthur was a pupil at the Royal Masonic School for Boys.

From 1925 to 1949 Margetson crossed the Atlantic, either alone or with his current wife, at least 20 times in several different liners, including the Île de France and the Queen Elizabeth. On 21 August 1924, the French vessel De Grasse transported Arthur and his first wife Rosamund on its maiden voyage from Le Havre, arriving in New York on 5 September.

== Stage performances ==
- (1917) Theodore and Co., at the Prince's, Edinburgh
- (1918) Telling the Tale at the Ambassador’s
- (1919) Duets given with Eileen Molyneux at the Chiswick Empire
- (1919) Midnight Frolics at The Hippodrome, Boscombe
- (1919) Topsy-Turvey — 1919 at the Kennington Theatre
- (1921) The Follies of 1921 at King’s Theatre, Dundee
- (1922) His Girl at the Gaiety Theatre, Sheffield
- (1925) Little Miss Bluebeard at Wyndham’s, with Irene Bordoni
- (1925) Betty in Mayfair at the Adelphi, with Jack Hobbs
- (1926) Kid Boots at the Winter Garden
- (1926) Just a Kiss at The Empire, Liverpool
- (1927) The Blue Train at the King’s Theatre, Southsea
- (1927) Noël Coward’s Home Chat at the Duke of York’s
- (1928) Paris at the Wilbur Theatre, Boston in June; then at the Music Box Theatre, New York in October
- (1929) Replaced Owen Nares as boxing hero Jim Brooks in Hold Everything! at the Palace Theatre, London
- (1930) Watch Beverly at the Q Theatre, Kew Bridge
- (1930) Heads Up! at the Palace Theatre
- (1930) Let us be Gay at the Theatre Royal, Birmingham with Tallulah Bankhead in the lead; his first appearance in a straight play
- (1931) Naughty Cinderella at the Comedy
- (1931) In an adaptation of Maugham’s novel The Painted Veil at The Playhouse
- (1932) Lovely Lady at the Phoenix. Closed after four performances
- (1932) Men About the House at the Theatre Royal, Bournemouth with Olga Lindo in the lead
- (1932) Nona at the Avon Theatre, New York
- (1933) A Good Woman, Poor Thing, at the Avon, New York
- (1933) A Saturday Night, at the Playhouse, New York
- (1933) Music in the Air, at His Majesty's Theatre, London
- (1934) No More Ladies, at Wyndham's, London
- (1936) Mainly for Lovers, at the 48th Street Theatre, New York
- (1937) The Laughing Cavalier, at The Adelphi, London
- (1938) Back Your Fancy, at the Theatre Royal, Brighton
- (1939) Magyar Melody, at His Majesty's, London
- (1939) Billy Draws a Horse, at the Playhouse, New York
- (1940) Charley's Aunt, at the Cort Theatre, New York
- (1940) A Case of Youth, National Theatre, New York
- (1941) Maugham’s Theatre, at the National, Washington
- (1942) Punch and Julia, at the National, Washington
- (1942) Flare Path, at Henry Miller's Theatre, New York, with Alec Guinness in his Broadway début
- (1943) Another Love Story, at the Fulton Theatre, New York
- (1944) Lovers and Friends, at the National, Washington
- (1944) Mrs. Kimball Presents, at the 48th Street Theatre, New York
- (1945) Life with Father, at the Empire, New York
- (1946) Park Avenue, at the Schubert, New York
- (1946) Claudia, at the Shubert, New York
- (1946) Around the World, at the Adelphi, New York
- (1946) Little Brown Jug, at the Martin Beck Theatre, New York
- (1948) The Play’s the Thing, at the National, Washington
- (1949) Clutterbuck, at the Biltmore, New York

== Filmography ==
- Wolves (1930) as Mark (film debut)
- Other People's Sins (1931) as Bernard Barrington
- Many Waters (1931) as Jim Barcaldine
- Flat No. 9 (1932) as John Danvers
- His Grace Gives Notice (1933) as George Barwick
- The Great Defender (1934) as Leslie Locke
- Little Friend (1934) as Hilliard
- Royal Cavalcade (1935) as Dining Officer
- The Mystery of the Mary Celeste (1935) as Capt. Benjamin Briggs
- The Divine Spark (1935) as Ernesto Tosi
- I Give My Heart (1935) as Count Du Barry
- Music Hath Charms (1935) as Alan Sterling
- Broken Blossoms (1936) as Battling Burrows
- Juggernaut (1936) as Roger Clifford
- Head Office (1936) as Dixon
- Pagliacci (1936) as Tonio
- Smash and Grab (1937) as Malvern
- Action for Slander (1938) as Capt. Hugh Bradford
- The Return of Carol Deane (1938) as Mark Poynton
- Me and My Pal (1939) as Andrews
- The Nursemaid Who Disappeared (1939) as Det. Antony Gethryn
- Return to Yesterday (1940) as Osbert
- Random Harvest (1942) as Chetwynd
- Commandos Strike at Dawn (1942) as German Colonel
- Thumbs Up (1943) as Bert Lawrence
- Sherlock Holmes Faces Death (1943) as Dr. Bob Sexton (final film)

== Personal life ==
Arthur Charles Margetson was born on 27 April 1897 in Marylebone, the second son of Edward John (a fruit salesman and Freemason) and Marion Stocqueler Home (née Wardroper). He attended the Royal Masonic School for Boys in Bushey.

Margetson married in turn:

- Rosamond Bertram Ifould (née Hobson) in Manhattan on 5 March 1923. She had had three children by her first marriage. They were divorced in London in 1925.
- Vera Alys Lennox, at the Savoy Chapel on 28 June 1926. She divorced him in London in 1932.
- Actress Shirley Grey (born Agnes Evangeline Zetterstrand in Connecticut), at Caxton Hall Register Office in 1936. A lighthearted account of their courtship is available online.
- Barbara Joyce Wood, a former photographers model, in New York in 1948.

Hammer House historian Howard Maxford states Margetson was originally a stockbroker, but provides no evidence. Arthur's brother Edward was an insurance brokers manager in 1939.

Arthur Margetson was keen on swimming, music, and lyric writing. He was a member of the Savage Club, the Stage Golfing Society and the Green Room Club.

Margetson died at the Central Middlesex Hospital on 12 August 1951. His home was at 20 Abbey Road St John's Wood.
