= Bertram Millhauser =

American screenwriter

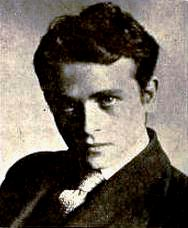
- Millhauser in 1919
- Born: March 25, 1892; New York, New York, United States
- Died: December 1, 1958 (aged 66); Hollywood, California, United States
- Occupation: Screenwriter
- Years active: 1911–1960

Bertram Millhauser (March 25, 1892 – December 1, 1958) was an American screenwriter. He wrote for more than 60 films produced between 1911 and 1960. He was born in New York City, New York and died in Hollywood, California from a heart attack.

== Partial filmography ==
- The Challenge (1916)
- The Fatal Ring (1917)
- The Black Secret (1919)
- The Fatal Sign (1920)
- The Phantom Foe (1920)
- Velvet Fingers (1920)
- The Yellow Arm (1921)
- The Timber Queen (1922)
- Speed (1922)
- Plunder (1923)
- The Eagle's Talons (1923)
- Code of the Sea (1924)
- Fools in the Dark (1924)
- Feet of Clay (1924)
- Forty Winks (1925)
- Silence (1926)
- Fighting Love (1927)
- The Leopard Lady (1928)
- Girls Gone Wild (1929)
- Conspiracy (1930)
- Three Who Loved (1931)
- Sherlock Holmes (1932)
- The Life of Jimmy Dolan (1933)
- Storm at Daybreak (1933)
- Ever in My Heart (1933)
- Jimmy the Gent (1934)
- College Scandal (1935)
- The Garden Murder Case (1936)
- The Magnificent Brute (1936)
- Under Cover of Night (1937)
- The Crime Nobody Saw (1937)
- Ebb Tide (1937)
- Scandal Street (1938)
- The Texans (1938)
- They Made Me a Criminal (1939)
- Nick Carter, Master Detective (1939)
- An Angel from Texas (1940)
- River's End (1940)
- The Big Shot (1942)
- Pierre of the Plains (1942)
- The Purple V (1943)
- Sherlock Holmes in Washington (1943)
- Sherlock Holmes Faces Death (1943)
- The Spider Woman (1943)
- The Invisible Man's Revenge (1944)
- The Pearl of Death (1944)
- The Suspect (1944)
- Patrick the Great (1945)
- The Woman in Green (1945)
- White Tie and Tails (1946)
- The Web (1947)
- Walk a Crooked Mile (1948)
- Tokyo Joe (1949)
- Pay or Die (1960)
