= Weatherwise (play) =

Short comic play by Noël Coward

Weatherwise is a short comic play in two scenes by Noël Coward. It was written in 1923 and first produced at the Festival Theatre, Malvern, England, in 1932.

The play portrays the turmoil caused by a mentally deranged aristocratic dowager who goes into a trance and behaves as if she were a dog. Her bouts of dog-mania are initiated by any mention of the weather.

== Background and productions ==
The circumstances in which Coward wrote the play are unclear. He does not mention it in his autobiography Present Indicative. In 1923 he had had two modest successes with I'll Leave It to You and The Young Idea, but his first box-office triumph, The Vortex, was yet to come.

The play was published as Weather Wise. A Shocking Tragedy in 1925 in The Crown & Anchor: A Chelsea Quarto, edited by Reginald Blunt.

The play was first performed in 1932, nine years after it was written, by The Noël Coward Company at the Festival Theatre, Malvern. The company was formed in 1932 as a touring ensemble, headed by Kate Cutler, to present Coward's plays around Britain. Weatherwise was the first of his plays directed by Coward himself, and it was given as an after-piece to Home Chat.

== Roles and original cast ==
- Lady Warple – Marjorie Haywood
- Monica (her daughter) – Agatha Carroll
- Cynthia (ib) – Joyce Wodeman
- Violet (ib) – Marjorie Taylor
- The Rev Harold Bassett (Monica's husband) – Keith Shepherd
- Reggie Whistler – James Mason
- Maid – Janet Burnell
- Dr Twickenham (a psychoanalyst) – Farries Moss

== Synopsis ==
Lady Warple and her daughters discuss spiritualism – her latest fad. She tells them of a sceptical woman who went to a séance and became possessed by a malignant spirit. Their cynical young friend Reggie suggests holding an impromptu séance, at the end of which Lady Warple is discovered in a trance. The others revive her, and at first she seems normal, but any mention of the weather causes her to bark and growl like a dog and rush about on all fours, tearing household items with her teeth, before suddenly returning to normal. After a week of this, a psychoanalyst, Dr Twickenham, is summoned. He recommends that at a signal from him all the family should pretend to be dogs. They do so, while Lady Warple watches calmly and goes on with her knitting [In the 1925 published version, the doctor merely questions "Mrs. Warple" in private.]. Twickenham declares her cured, but then makes a casual remark about the weather, at which Lady Warple springs at his throat and worries him to death.

== Critical reception ==
Coward's biographer Philip Hoare makes brief mention of Weatherwise noting it as a precursor to Blithe Spirit in showing the author's fascination with spiritualism.

== References and sources ==
=== Sources ===
- Hoare, Philip (1995). Noël Coward, A Biography. London: Sinclair-Stevenson. ISBN 978-1-4081-0675-4.
- Mander, Raymond; Joe Mitchenson (1957). Theatrical Companion to Coward. London: Rockliff. OCLC 470106222.
