= Man-Proof =

1938 film by Richard Thorpe

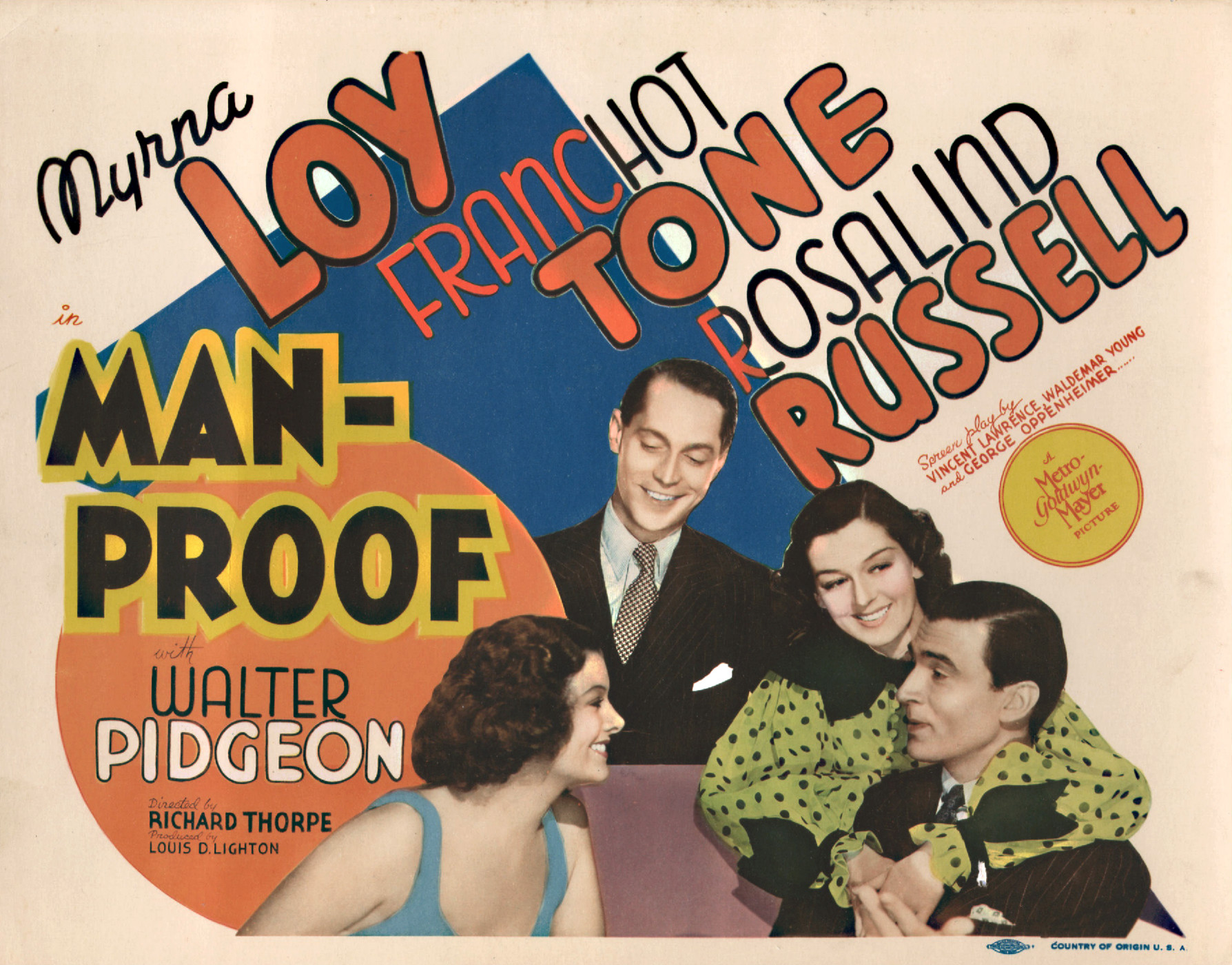
- Lobby card
- Directed by: Richard Thorpe
- Screenplay by: Waldemar Young; Vincent Lawrence; George Oppenheimer
- Based on: The Four Marys; 1937 novel by Fanny Heaslip Lea
- Produced by: Louis D. Lighton
- Starring: Myrna Loy; Franchot Tone; Rosalind Russell; Walter Pidgeon
- Cinematography: Karl Freund
- Edited by: George Boemler
- Music by: Franz Waxman
- Production company: Metro-Goldwyn-Mayer
- Distributed by: Loew's, Inc.
- Release date: January 7, 1938
- Running time: 75 minutes
- Country: United States
- Language: English
- Budget: $513,000
- Box office: $1,095,000

Man-Proof is a 1938 American romantic comedy film directed by Richard Thorpe. The film is based on the 1937 novel The Four Marys written by Fannie Heaslip Lea.

== Plot ==
The daughter of wealthy and famous novelist Meg Swift, Mimi is a young woman who seems to have a perfect life. The opposite appears to be the case, as her deep love for playboy Alan Wythe remains unanswered. Despite her mother's newspaper artist friend Jimmy Kilmartin warnings of Alan's scandalous past revolving around women, Mimi is determined to one day become Mrs. Wythe. However, another woman beats her to the title. Mimi is crushed when she finds out that Alan is marrying heiress Elizabeth Kent, but swallows her pride to serve as the bridesmaid.

At the wedding, Mimi overhears snobbish women gossiping about her love life. As a result, she gets drunk and admits to Alan she is in love with him. Later that night, Jimmy attempts to console her, as does Meg. Encouraged by her mother, Mimi agrees to move out of the house and build a career to forget Alan. After moving into an apartment, Jimmy arranges a job for her as an illustrator at his newspaper. Months go by and Mimi has become a happy woman, although she has not forgotten about Alan. When she receives notice of Alan and Elizabeth's return from their honeymoon, she pretends she no longer has feelings for Alan.

Encouraged by those thoughts, she even agrees to meet Alan and offers to be friends with him. Alan is interested, and they decide to go out. Meg and Jimmy spot them attending a boxing match and are immediately worried. Following a joyful night with Alan the next day, Mimi admits to Jimmy that she is still in love with Alan. Jimmy tries to prevent her from breaking up a marriage, but Mimi is determined to convince Alan to divorce Elizabeth so they can marry. She calls Elizabeth and informs her of her true feelings.

Later that day, Alan, despite being discouraged by Jimmy, meets Mimi with plans to continue their affair. He is worried when he finds out he is to divorce Elizabeth. They are interrupted by a visit from Elizabeth, who blames her husband for being too selfish. Alan agrees with his wife, and accompanies Elizabeth to save their marriage, leaving Mimi behind, crushed. Yet again, Jimmy consoles Mimi and they agree to end their quarrel over their different views on morality. After arriving at Meg's, they realize they have been in love with each other the entire time and kiss.

== Cast ==
- Myrna Loy as Mimi Swift
- Franchot Tone as Jimmy Kilmartin
- Rosalind Russell as Elizabeth Kent
- Walter Pidgeon as Alan Wythe
- Nana Bryant as Meg Swift
- John Miljan as Tommy Gaunt
- Gwen Lee as Binnie Bell
- Rita Johnson as Florence (scenes deleted)
- Ruth Hussey as Jane (scenes deleted)
- George Chandler as Newspaper Room Employee (uncredited)

== Production ==
Man-Proof went into production in 1937 under the working title The Four Marys. In July 1937, it was announced that Richard Thorpe would direct the film, with Myrna Loy, Rosalind Russell, Melvyn Douglas and Franchot Tone in the leading roles. Douglas was replaced by Walter Pidgeon.

By the time shooting started, Myrna Loy was mourning the death of her friend and colleague Jean Harlow. Nevertheless, she recalled that she experienced production of Man-Proof as joyful because of her positive experience with co-stars Pidgeon and Rosalind Russell. Loy and Russell became friends during shooting, and they frequently had tried for the same movie roles in the past.

== Reception ==
The film received generally negative reviews, and critics complained that the film was "trifling," "thin" and "clichéd." Furthermore, Man-Proof flopped at the box office.

=== Box office ===
According to MGM records, the film earned $824,000 in the U.S. and Canada and $271,000 in other markets, resulting in a profit of $217,000.
