= Every Girl Should Be Married =

1948 film by Don Hartman

- Directed by: Don Hartman
- Written by: Don Hartman; Eleanor Harris (story); Stephen Morehouse Avery (Scr collaboration)
- Produced by: Don Hartman
- Starring: Betsy Drake; Cary Grant; Franchot Tone
- Cinematography: George E. Diskant
- Edited by: Harry Marker
- Music by: Leigh Harline; C. Bakaleinikoff
- Distributed by: RKO Pictures
- Release date: 9 November 1948
- Running time: 85 minutes
- Country: United States
- Language: English
- Box office: $2.8 million

Every Girl Should Be Married is a 1948 American romantic comedy film directed by Don Hartman and starring Cary Grant, Betsy Drake and Franchot Tone. Grant and Drake married a year after the film's release.

== Plot ==
Department store salesclerk Anabel Sims is very enamoured with the idea of getting married. So when handsome pediatrician Dr. Madison Brown asks for her help in making a purchase, she decides that he is the one for her.

He is quite happy as a bachelor, but Anabel proves to be a very determined schemer. She learns all she can about him, everything from where he went to school to his favorite foods. Madison soon realizes her intentions and does his best to fend off the young woman.

Anabel makes a reservation at a restaurant on a day when she knows that Madison habitually dines there. In an attempt to make him jealous, she pretends to be waiting for wealthy, three-times-married playboy Roger Sanford, who happens to be her employer and Madison's university classmate. By chance, Roger shows up. Fortunately for her, Roger believes that she is using Madison as a ruse to get acquainted with him. However, the maneuver fails; Madison's feelings remain unchanged.

Anabel comes up with more ingenious schemes, but they are all unsuccessful. However, Roger falls in love with her. He eventually asks her to marry him, but she only invites him to dinner at her home. When Anabel's best friend Julie warns Madison, he begins to worry, knowing something of Roger's success with women. The doctor invites himself to the little soirée. While waiting for Anabel, they are unexpectedly joined by "Old Joe", Anabel's longtime hometown beau, who announces that he and Anabel are finally going to get married. At first, Madison congratulates them, but after thinking about it, makes his own bid for her hand. Anabel leaves the decision up to Joe, who bows out, saying that he only wants her to be happy. After Joe leaves, Madison informs Anabel that her research on him was incomplete; he recognized "Joe's" voice as that of a radio performer he listens to frequently. Madison and Anabel are soon discussing their wedding plans with a clergyman.

== Cast ==
- Cary Grant as Dr. Madison W. Brown
- Franchot Tone as Roger Sanford
- Diana Lynn as Julie Hudson
- Betsy Drake as Anabel Sims
- Alan Mowbray as Mr. Spitzer
- Elisabeth Risdon as Nurse Mary Nolan
- Richard Gaines as Sam McNutt
- Harry Hayden as Gogarty
- Chick Chandler as Harry, the Soda Clerk
- Leon Belasco as Violinist
- Fred Essler as Pierre, the Restaurant Owner
- Anna Q. Nilsson as Saleslady
- Eddie Albert as Harry Proctor, aka "Old Joe" (uncredited)

== Production ==
Every Girl Should Be Married was based on a short story written by Eleanor Harris in an October 1947 edition of the Ladies' Home Journal. The film's lead actors, Cary Grant and Betsy Drake were married in real life one year after the film's release. Drake was Grant's third wife. Grant spotted Drake performing in a stage play in London called Deep Are the Roots two years before the film's release. Grant was reportedly "intrigued by her talent and charm." The couple met a year before the film's release aboard the luxury liner RMS Queen Mary traveling from England back to the United States, where they were formally introduced to each other on the liner by actress and fellow passenger Merle Oberon. Grant and Drake became friends and soon were romantically involved.

Drake was a stage actress from America with no film credits to her name at that time, but Cary Grant convinced Dore Schary, head of production at RKO Pictures, to sign Drake to a contract with the company. Barbara Bel Geddes was initially intended to play Anabel Sims, but Grant and industrialist Howard Hughes wanted Drake to play the role. Grant made sure he had a say in anything that concerned Drake's performance from lighting to dialogue and used his influence on everyone involved with the film.

According to Cary Grant's biographer Marc Eliot, Grant knew that acting on screen with Drake was a risky proposition and that the general public would rightly speculate that she had gotten the part only because she was his girlfriend. According to an interview with gossip columnist Hedda Hopper, Drake believed if everyone thought she had gotten her breakthrough because of Grant, then they were very wrong about him and her. She further suggested that Grant had simply made it possible for them to share a creative experience with their real-life chemistry. The film turned out to be a positive experience for both Grant and Drake, with the only downside being that Hughes insisting on becoming actively involved in every aspect of its production, with the result that Schary abruptly resigned from RKO. Hughes then allowed Grant to rewrite much of the script, and even to instruct director Don Hartman in how to shoot several scenes, so as to shift much of the film's visual emphasis from his character to Drake's.

In the biography Cary Grant: The Lonely Heart, authors Charles Higham and Roy Mosely claimed that "Cary watched every move Betsy made on the set, endlessly checking her out, imitating her cruelly in scenes, and at times encouraging her — mistakenly — to imitate Katharine Hepburn's mannered playing."

== Reception ==
Bosley Crowther of The New York Times praised Betsy Drake's performance, saying that she displays "a refreshingly natural comic spirit". Likewise, the weekly American entertainment trade magazine Variety described Drake's performance in the film as "a tour de force in the romantic comedy vein," while calling the film "one of those rare comic delicacies that are always in good season." Dennis Schwartz was more critical of the film and said, "Writer-director Don Hartman fails to get much comedy out of the comedy".

The film was RKO's most lucrative production of 1948, making $775,000 in profits.

Grant and Drake reprised their roles for a one-hour Lux Radio Theatre broadcast on two occasions; the first broadcast was held on 27 June 1949, and the second on 17 April 1950.

== Bibliography ==
- Eliot, Marc (2004). Cary Grant: A Biography. New York: Crown Publishing Group. ISBN 978-0-307-20983-2.
