= Virginia Verrill =

American singer (1916–1999)

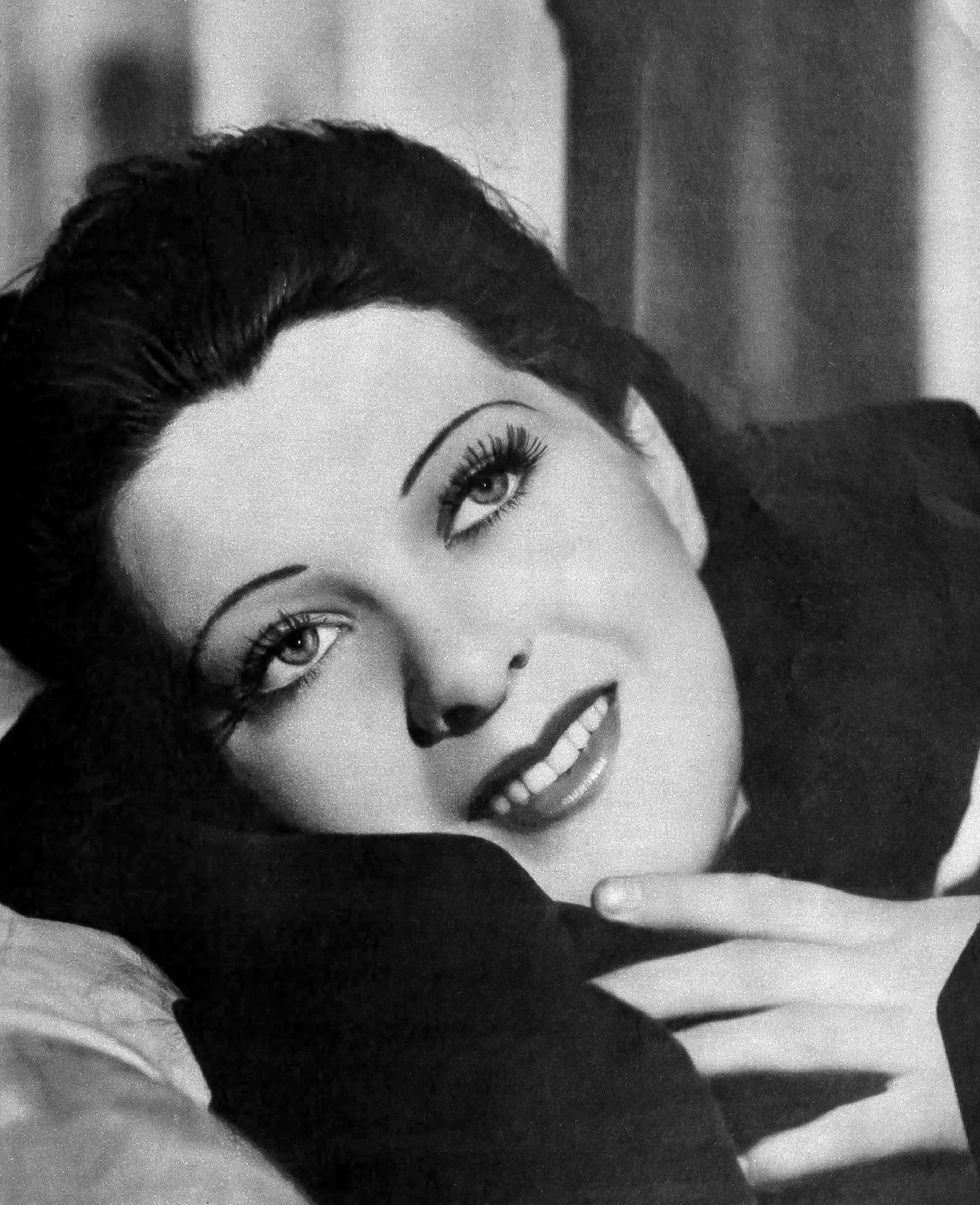
- Verrill in 1935
- Born: November 20, 1916; Santa Monica, California, U.S.
- Died: January 18, 1999 (aged 82); Raleigh, North Carolina, U.S.
- Occupation: Singer
- Spouse: James K. Breyley (1913-1988) m1940-1960 (divorced) Dr. Louis Duddleston (1915-2003) m 1961
- Children: 2

Catherine Virginia Verrill (November 20, 1916 – January 18, 1999) was a singer in the era of old-time radio and big bands. Her work included providing the off-screen singing voices for some female film stars.

== Early years ==
Verrill was born Catherine Virginia Verrill in Santa Monica, California. Her mother, Aimee McLean Verrill, was active in vaudeville. At 5 months of age, Verrill appeared with her mother in her act.

Verrill's family was friends with orchestra leader Paul Whiteman, who had Virginia sing on his bandstand when she was 3 years old. She attended Hollywood's John Marshall High School. (Another source says that she graduated from Hollywood High School.)

== Radio ==
By the time she was 13, Verrill was singing on local stations, with her debut coming on KMPC in 1932. In 1934, she sang with David Brockman and the KHJ orchestra on California Melodies, which originated at KHJ and was carried on the CBS network. Early in 1935, columnist Walter Winchell reported that Verrill had begun working for CBS. In June 1935, she was singing on the Socony Sketchbook with Johnny Green's orchestra and had "a starring contract" on another show that was planned. That program debuted July 2, 1935, with Verrill as star and Mark Warnow conducting the accompanying orchestra. She had another program, Vocals by Verrill, in 1937.

Verrill performed regularly on the variety shows College Humor Program, Uncle Walter's Dog House, Home Town, Unincorporated, The Jack Haley Show, and Maxwell House Show Boat.

She was also heard on broadcasts with Orville Knapp's Orchestra.

== Personal appearances ==
In 1934, Verrill sang with Marvin George and his Hermosa Hut Orchestra. She also "was featured at the Colony Club and other famous Hollywood rendezvous."

== Film ==
When she was 13, Verrill won an audition over 300 others to sing the title song in Barbara Stanwyck's Ten Cents a Dance," (1931). By the time she was 18 years old, she had "frequently played voice double for Hollywood picture stars." Her dubbing included singing for Jean Harlow in both Reckless (1935) and Suzy (1936).

On-screen, she was seen in Hide-Out (1934) and Walter Wanger's Vogues of 1938.

== Personal life ==
By 1942, Verrill had left show business. A newspaper column printed September 25 of that year reported, "Virginia, at the age of 25, has retired from the stage and screen and is now a happy housewife and mother and is reported to be the best pie crust baker on the block."

At the time of her death, Verrill was married to Dr. Louis C. Duddleston. The two had wed on June 17, 1961, in Crystal Lake, Illinois; he was a dentist then living in nearby Woodstock who had previously taught at Northwestern University. Her first husband was a Music Corporation of America's chief band-booking executive in Chicago.

== Death ==
Verrill died January 18, 1999, at age 82, in the Mayview Nursing Home in Raleigh, North Carolina. Survivors included her husband, a son, a daughter, and seven grandchildren.
