= Stephen Morehouse Avery =

American screenwriter (1893–1948)

- Born: December 20, 1893; Webster Groves, Missouri, U.S.
- Died: February 10, 1948 (aged 54)
- Education: University of Missouri
- Occupation: Screenwriter
- Children: Phyllis Avery
- Relatives: Don Taylor (son-in-law)

Stephen Morehouse Avery (December 20, 1893 – February 10, 1948) was an American screenwriter. He was nominated for an Academy Award in the category Best Story for the film The Gay Deception.

Avery died on February 10, 1948, at the age of 54.

== Selected filmography ==
- The Gay Deception (1935; co-nominated with Don Hartman)
