= Three Loves Has Nancy =

1938 film by Richard Thorpe

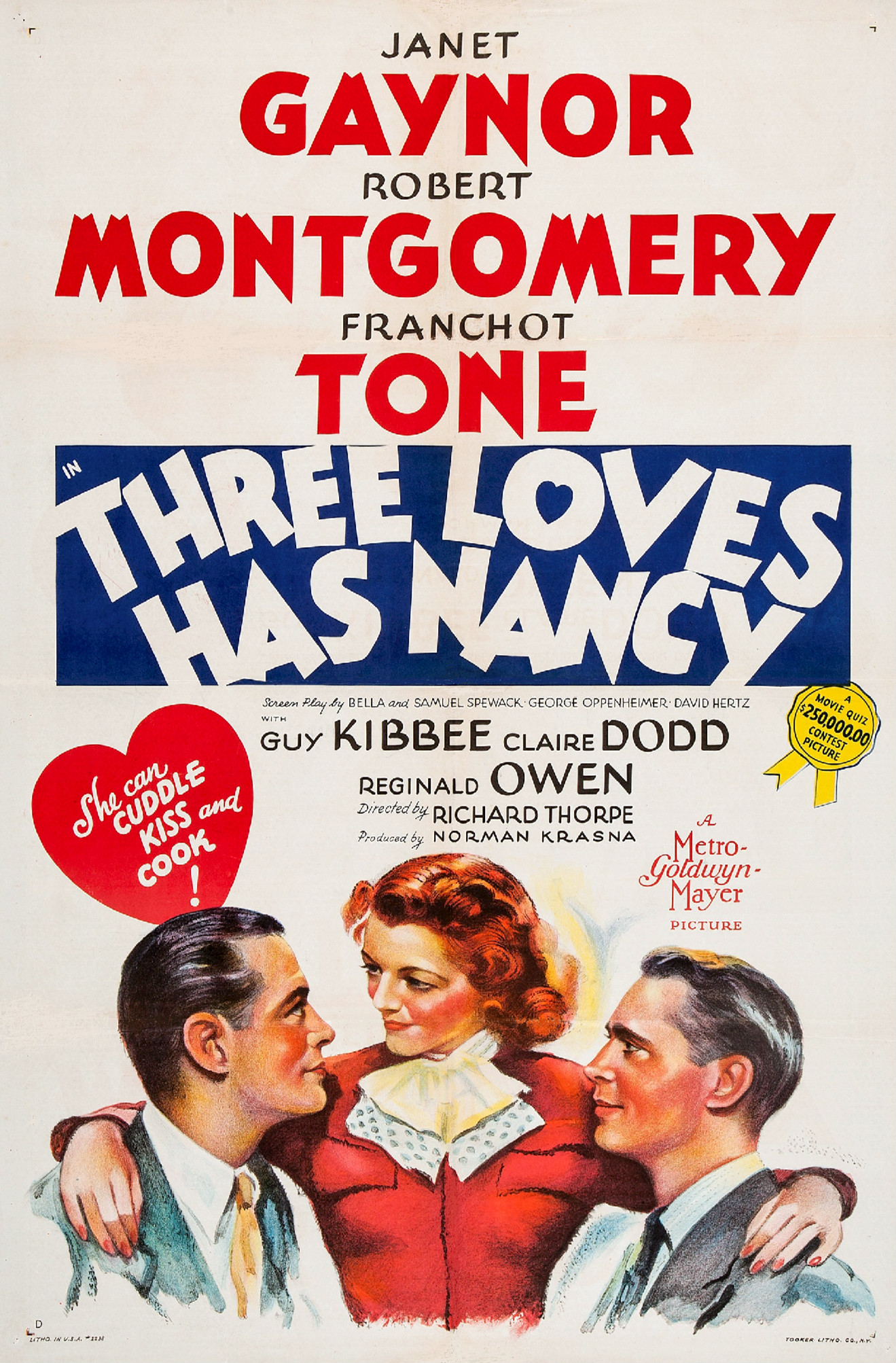
- Theatrical release poster
- Directed by: Richard Thorpe
- Written by: Bella and Samuel Spewack; George Oppenheimer; Lee Loeb; David Hertz
- Produced by: Norman Krasna
- Starring: Janet Gaynor; Robert Montgomery; Franchot Tone
- Cinematography: William H. Daniels
- Edited by: Frederick Y. Smith
- Music by: William Axt
- Distributed by: Metro-Goldwyn-Mayer
- Release date: September 2, 1938
- Running time: 70 minutes
- Country: United States
- Language: English
- Box office: $2 million (U.S. and Canada rentals)

Three Loves Has Nancy is a 1938 American romantic comedy film directed by Richard Thorpe and starring Janet Gaynor, Robert Montgomery and Franchot Tone. It is set in New York City.

== Plot ==
The seduction plans of novelist Malcolm Niles go awry when actress Vivian Herford brings along her mother to a candlelight dinner in his New York apartment. When they talk of marriage, Malcolm decides to make a tour promoting his new book. In a small southern town, he meets Nancy Briggs at an autographing session at the local bookstore. Nancy is getting married that night, but her fiancé, working in New York, doesn't come back for the wedding. Her family gives her the fare to go to New York to find him. At the same time, Malcolm gets a wire from his publisher and friend, Robert Hanson, telling him to come home because Vivian has left town. Traveling to New York on the same train, Nancy proves to be a pest whom Malcolm hopes to avoid once they arrive. When Nancy can't find her fiancé, she goes to Malcolm, since he's the only one she knows in the city. He is about to kick her out when Vivian returns, so he uses Nancy as an excuse to get rid of Vivian. Further comedy ensues.

== Cast ==
- Janet Gaynor as Nancy Briggs
- Robert Montgomery as Mal Niles
- Franchot Tone as Bob Hanson
- Guy Kibbee as Pa Briggs
- Claire Dodd as Vivian Herford
- Reginald Owen as William
- Cora Witherspoon as Mrs. Herford
- Emma Dunn as Mrs. Briggs
- Charley Grapewin as Grandpa Briggs
- Lester Matthews as Alonzo Stewart
- Grady Sutton as George Wilkins Jr.
- Mary Forbes as Mrs. Hanson
- Grant Withers as Jack
- Charles Lane as Cleaning Store Manager (uncredited)
