= The Stranger's Return =

1933 film by King Vidor

- Directed by: King Vidor
- Written by: Philip Stong (novel/screenplay); Brown Holmes
- Produced by: Lucien Hubbard
- Starring: Miriam Hopkins; Lionel Barrymore; Franchot Tone
- Cinematography: William H. Daniels
- Edited by: Richard Fantl; Ben Lewis
- Distributed by: Metro-Goldwyn-Mayer
- Release date: July 21, 1933
- Running time: 89 minutes
- Country: United States
- Language: English
- Budget: $300,000
- Box office: $630,000

The Stranger's Return is a 1933 American Pre-Code drama film directed by King Vidor and starring Miriam Hopkins, Lionel Barrymore and Franchot Tone. It was released by Metro-Goldwyn-Mayer. Miriam Hopkins was loaned out to MGM for the picture while under contract to Paramount.

== Plot ==
Miriam Hopkins plays Louise Storr, a recently divorced New Yorker who travels west to Iowa to visit her paternal grandfather, a relation she has never met. Grandpa Storr (Lionel Barrymore) an 85-year-old patriarch, presides over his large farm and its employees. A number of distant relatives are long time residents in his household. They receive the city-girl granddaughter with reserved solicitude. Miriam meets the owner of the adjoining property, the married farmer Guy Crane (Franchot Tone), a college-educated Iowan she finds attractive. It is revealed that Guy's college thesis paper was published and drew interest from Cornell University (p. 109).

Grandfather Storr's unconcealed preference for his close blood-kin Louise creates tension in the household. She is tested by the resident relatives and farm hands in her performance of her duties on the spread. Her essential good sense and self-esteem serve her well, despite her urban upbringing.

Grandpa Storr, a military veteran of the Civil War, begins to display signs of dementia and the coterie of resident relatives quickly call for a mental evaluation to deem him legally unfit to operate the farm. The old man's apparent descent into madness is only a clever ruse to expose their avarice. He alters his will to disinherit the scheming relations and bequeaths the farm to Louise — the medical examiners acting as witnesses. His ultimate task in life completed, he dies peacefully.

To put an end to a blossoming romance between himself and Louise, Guy announces that he and his wife will sell their farm and go "[t]o the city", where he will presumably teach agriculture. Louise assumes her position as owner and operator of her grandfather's farm, deeply committed to her ancestral land.

== Cast ==
- Miriam Hopkins as Louise Starr
- Lionel Barrymore as Grandpa Storr
- Franchot Tone as Guy Crane
- Stuart Erwin as Simon
- Irene Hervey as Nettie
- Beulah Bondi as Beatrice
- Grant Mitchell as Allan Redfield

== Reception ==
The New York Times called the film "a shrewd, delightful and altogether effective entertainment, with a hearty and brilliant performance by Lionel Barrymore as the season's liveliest octogenarian." Variety declared it "an outstanding production from the three angles of story, production and acting, in spite of the, from some angles, unsatisfactory ending." John Mosher of The New Yorker wrote a mixed review that faulted the plot: "Though the film is longish, too long, we want more explanations of the people than are given." Harrison's Reports wrote that although the film "offers some good character studies, particularly the one portrayed by Lionel Barrymore as a self-willed old man, it is too slow for the masses," adding that it was difficult to sympathize with the love affair "because the hero is married to a very decent woman."

== Box office ==
The film grossed a total (domestic and foreign) of $630,000: $439,000 from the US and Canada and $191,000 elsewhere. It made a profit of $106,000.
