= True to Life (film) =

1943 film by George Marshall

- Directed by: George Marshall
- Screenplay by: Don Hartman; Harry Tugend
- Story by: Ben Barzman; Bess Taffel; Sol Barzman
- Produced by: Paul Jones
- Starring: Mary Martin; Franchot Tone; Dick Powell
- Cinematography: Charles Lang
- Edited by: Leroy Stone
- Music by: Victor Young
- Production company: Paramount Pictures
- Distributed by: Paramount Pictures
- Release date: December 24, 1943
- Running time: 94 minutes
- Country: United States
- Language: English

True to Life is a 1943 American comedy film directed by George Marshall and starring Mary Martin, Franchot Tone and Dick Powell. The film features three songs by Hoagy Carmichael with lyrics by Johnny Mercer.

== Plot ==
Writers Fletcher Marvin and Link Ferris must improve their scripts for a radio drama or face the wrath of their sponsor, a major soap company. Going in different directions, Fletcher heads to "bright lights and lovely ladies", while Link meets the Porter family and falls in love with their daughter, Bonnie. She mistakenly believes that he is unemployed and poor, and takes him back to lodge at her house while he seeks work. He meets her family including her eccentric inventor father and gruff, layabout uncle. He begins using them as characters in his new radio show, which rapidly becomes an enormous hit. He has to do everything he can to prevent the family finding out that he is turning their everyday lives and conversations into entertainment, a task not helped when his writing partner Fletcher turns up believing that the show could do with the plot development of a romantic rival.

== Cast ==
- Mary Martin as Bonnie Porter
- Franchot Tone as Fletcher Marvin
- Dick Powell as Link Ferris
- Victor Moore as Pop Porter
- Mabel Paige as Mom Porter
- William Demarest as Uncle Jake
- Clarence Kolb as Mr. Huggins
- Beverly Hudson as Twips
- Raymond Roe as Clem
- Ernest Truex as Oscar Elkins
- Harry Shannon as Mr. Mason
- Stanley Andrews as Frank, Bakery Foreman
- Charles R. Moore as Gabe the Butler
- Nestor Paiva as Kapopolis
- Tim Ryan as Mr. Mammal
