= Don Hartman =

American film producer (1900–1958)

Samuel Donald Hartman (18 November 1900 – 23 March 1958) was an American screenwriter and director and former production head of Paramount Pictures. He and Stephen Morehouse Avery were nominated for the Academy Award for Best Story for The Gay Deception (1935). He was also nominated with Frank Butler for the Academy Award for Best Original Screenplay for Road to Morocco in 1942.

== Biography ==
Hartman was born in Brooklyn, where his father ran the Park Circle Theatre. Hartman ran away from home to Chicago, where he worked as a bellhop, before returning to New York, where he worked in a bank. At 17 he moved to Texas, working as a truck driver. He also studied at Baylor University. In Texas he became an actor, appearing at the Dallas Little Theatre, before appearing on Broadway in Aurania Rouverol's play Skidding as Andy Hardy. Hartman started to put on shows at hotels in the Catskill Mountains, including at Grossinger's Catskill Resort Hotel, and had Dore Schary as an assistant. He started writing books and lyrics for musical plays and material for radio and stage shows.

He started his film career as a lyricist in 1930 and in 1933 he moved to Hollywood. He wrote the screenplay for Romance in Manhattan for RKO Pictures before joining Paramount as a writer in 1935. There he co-wrote the first three films of the Road to... series with Frank Butler. He also co-wrote Danny Kaye's first two feature films: Up in Arms (1944) and Wonder Man (1945). In 1947, he became a writer-producer-director, making It Had to Be You (1947) and Every Girl Should Be Married (1948), working at Columbia Pictures, RKO and MGM, the latter with Schary again.

In 1951, he became an executive producer at Paramount, where he worked as production head under Y. Frank Freeman. Together, they had success at Paramount. He left the role in 1956 to become an independent producer for Paramount, producing film versions of plays he had bought for Paramount, Desire Under the Elms and The Matchmaker (both 1958). Desire Under the Elms was released just prior to his death and was panned by critics which left him frustrated and disappointed. The Matchmaker was released posthumously. He had also been working on a third film based on the play The Chalk Garden by Enid Bagnold, but Paramount halted pre-production shortly before his death at age 57.

He married Helen, with whom he had a son, Timothy, and two daughters.

== Selected filmography ==
=== As screenwriter ===
- Romance in Manhattan (1935)
- The Gay Deception (1935)
- Coronado (1935)
- The Princess Comes Across (1936)
- Champagne Waltz (1937)
- Waikiki Wedding (1937)
- Tropic Holiday (1938)
- Paris Honeymoon (1939)
- Never Say Die (1939)
- The Star Maker (1939)
- Road to Singapore (1940)
- Road to Zanzibar (1941)
- Nothing but the Truth (1941)
- My Favorite Blonde (1942)
- Road to Morocco (1942)
- True to Life (1943)
- Up in Arms (1944)
- The Princess and the Pirate (1944)
- Wonder Man (1945)
- The Kid from Brooklyn (1946)

=== As director ===
- It Had to Be You (1947) (also wrote and produced)
- Every Girl Should Be Married (1948) (also wrote and produced)
- Holiday Affair (1949) (also produced)
- Mr. Imperium (1951) (also wrote)
- It's a Big Country (1951) (co-directed)

=== As producer ===
- Down to Earth (1947) (also wrote)
- Desire Under the Elms (1958)
- The Matchmaker (1958)
