= Kathryn Card =

American actress (1892–1964)

- Born: October 4, 1892; Butte, Montana, U.S.
- Died: March 1, 1964 (aged 71); Costa Mesa, California, U.S.
- Resting place: Harbor Lawn-Mount Olive Memorial Park, Costa Mesa, California
- Occupation: Actress
- Years active: 1933–1964
- Children: 1

Kathryn Card (October 4, 1892 – March 1, 1964) was an American radio, television, and film actress who may be best remembered for her role as Mrs. McGillicuddy, Lucy's mother on I Love Lucy.

== Radio ==
Born in Butte, Montana as one of the four children of Richard Sheehan and Esther McCurdy, both from Ireland, as Catherine Rose Sheehan, Card did radio roles in the late 1930s, notably Uncle Walter's Doghouse, broadcast on NBC from 1939 to 1942. She played Grandma Barton in The Bartons from December 25, 1939 to September 11, 1942, and played three roles (Carrie, Sue, and Bess) on Just Neighbors from May 30 to September 23, 1938. In 1943, she was a cast member of Helpmate, a daytime serial on NBC. In the late 1930s, she also was in that network's Story of Mary Marlin. She was also a member of the casts of Girl Alone and The Woman in White.

== Film ==
Her first screen credit was in 1945 for her role as Louise in the Corliss Archer movie Kiss and Tell, starring Shirley Temple as Corliss Archer. The next year, she appeared in Undercurrent with Robert Taylor, Katharine Hepburn, and Robert Mitchum. Then, in 1949, Card gave an interesting albeit brief performance (uncredited) as an extremely polite but no-nonsense loan processor for prospective borrower Joan Bennett in The Reckless Moment.

Card also had a small role as a landlady of the Oleander Arms Hotel in the 1954 Warner Bros. remake of A Star Is Born. Her part consisted of one scene early in the film when movie actor Norman Maine (played by James Mason) is desperately trying to find Esther Blodgett, a girl singer he had only met briefly (played by Judy Garland). Shortly after the movie's release, Warner Bros. made extensive cuts of the film and Card's role was deleted entirely until 1983, when film historian Ronald Haver found the original monaural three-hour soundtrack along with most of the missing footage and restored the scenes. Though Card's scene with James Mason had been preserved aurally, no existing footage or stills of their scene together were found, so Haver "manufactured" stills of the scene using another actress to stand in for Card to accompany the dialogue with Card and Mason on the soundtrack.

== Television ==
On February 8, 1954, Card made her first television appearance in an episode of I Love Lucy. The installment, entitled "Fan Magazine Interview", featured Card playing a slatternly woman named Minnie Finch. The following year, she was cast as a totally different character, Mrs. McGillicuddy, Lucy's bird-brained mother. She joined the Ricardos and the Mertzes in Hollywood when Lucy's husband, Ricky Ricardo, was given the opportunity to star in a motion picture. Mrs McGillicuddy would frequently annoy Ricky immeasurably by mistakenly calling him "Mickey" or mistaking him for his fellow bandleader Xavier Cugat. She portrayed that character in five episodes during the 1954-1955 season, and appeared in three more installments during the 1955-1956 season when the Ricardos and the Mertzes traveled to Europe. However, Card's character never appeared again once both couples moved to Connecticut in the following year. She reprised that role for the last time in one episode of The Lucille Ball-Desi Arnaz Show entitled "The Ricardos Go to Japan", which also featured guest star Robert Cummings, in 1959.

In addition to I Love Lucy, Card guest-starred on several other television shows. She can be seen in two 1959 episodes of Perry Mason, portraying Hannah Barton in "The Case of the Deadly Toy" and in the role of Harriet Snow in "The Case of the Watery Witness." Some of her other television appearances include The George Burns and Gracie Allen Show, Make Room for Daddy, Alfred Hitchcock Presents, and Rawhide. Card appeared in an episode of Wagon Train, S3E35, “The Charlene Brenton Story”, as a grandmother of 13. Card also appears in the 1958 Warner Bros. film Home Before Dark. Her final film appearance is in the 1964 MGM musical The Unsinkable Molly Brown.

== Family ==
Kathryn Sheehan married Erwin Foster Card in 1910, and they had a daughter, Ada Ester Card (married name Winstanley), who was born in 1912 and died in 1943.

== Death ==
On March 1, 1964, Card died as a result of a fatal heart attack at the age of 71 at her home in Costa Mesa, California. She is interred in Harbor Lawn-Mount Olive Memorial Park in Costa Mesa.

== Selected filmography ==
- Undercurrent (1946)
- The Hucksters (1947)
- Born to Kill (1947)
- The Dark Past (1948)
- I Love Lucy
- It Happens Every Thursday (1953)
- Alfred Hitchcock Presents (1955) (Season 1 Episode 13: "The Cheney Vase") as Bella
- Hollywood or Bust (1955)
- Please Don't Eat the Daisies (1960)
- The Alfred Hitchcock Hour (1963) (Season 1 Episode 24: "The Star Juror") as Elsie Grissom
