= Trail of the Vigilantes =

1940 film directed by Allan Dwan

Trail of the Vigilantes is a 1940 75-minute black-and-white Western comedy directed by Allan Dwan, written by Harold Shumate, and featuring Franchot Tone, Warren William, Broderick Crawford and Andy Devine.

== Plot summary ==
Undercover agent Tim "Kansas" Mason is sent from the East deep into the Mid-west to investigate the murder of a newspaperman. Kansa arrives in the middle of a bar fight, when the sheriff, Corley, and his deputies defend themselves against local cowboy Swanee and his valet Meadows. Kansas manages to take the wrong side in the brawl. The commotion stops when Swanee's boss, John Thornton, and Mark Dawson from the Cattlemen's Protective Association arrive on the scene.

Kansas is hired by Thornton as a cowboy and he returns with the rest of the cowboys to the ranch. Thornton's teenage daughter, Barbara, instantly falls in love with Kansas. He soon learns that this ranch and other ones that have refused to become members of the Cattlemen's Association, have been victims of vandalism. Kansas is therefore suspicious and decides to search Dawson's office for clues. He finds proof that Dawson has been taking money from the association for various unknown purposes.

Unfortunately, Dawson walks in on Kansas when he is in the office, but he manages to escape and brings the proof with him. Dawson reports the break-in to the police and make them arrest Kansas. The other cowboys at the ranch rescues him from the town jail, and they know that he is a federal marshal undercover.

Kansas deduces that Dawson and his men plan to rob the Cattlemen's money, $20,000 in total. With the help of the other cowboys, Kansas manages to take the box with all the money before Dawson gets it.

Jailed for robbery, Kansas is rescued by Bolo, Meadows and Swanee, who know that he is a federal marshal. Dawson tries to frame Kansas, claiming that he has robbed the Cattlemen of its money. Again he tries to get Kansas arrested, but the other cowboys all testify on Kansas behalf.

Having retrieved the money, Dawson plans to leave town, but the sheriff has got hold of the proof of Dawson's illegal activities and plans. Kansas and the three cowboys ride into town to confront Dawson and stop him, and meet him at the saloon. When Kansas' horse runs amok into the saloon, scared by gunfire, the rest of the cowboys manage to overpower and apprehend Dawson and his men. After Dawson's men are put behind bars, Kansas remains in town and marries Barbara, settling down as a full-time cowboy.

== Cast ==
- Franchot Tone as "Kansas"/Tim Mason
- Warren William as Mark Dawson
- Broderick Crawford as Swanee
- Andy Devine as Meadows
- Mischa Auer as Bolo
- Porter Hall as Sheriff Korley
- Peggy Moran as Barbara Thornton
- Samuel S. Hinds as George Preston
- Charles Trowbridge as John Thornton
- Paul Fix as Lefty
- Harry Cording as Phil
- Max Wagner as Joe
