= Straight Is the Way =

1934 American drama film directed by Paul Sloane

- Directed by: Paul Sloane
- Screenplay by: Bernard Schubert
- Based on: Straight Is the Way by Dana Burnet; George Abbott
- Produced by: Lucien Hubbard
- Starring: Franchot Tone; May Robson; Karen Morley; Gladys George; Nat Pendleton; Jack La Rue
- Cinematography: Lucien N. Andriot
- Edited by: William S. Gray
- Music by: William Axt
- Production company: Metro-Goldwyn-Mayer
- Distributed by: Loew's, Inc.
- Release date: August 10, 1934
- Running time: 59 minutes
- Country: United States
- Language: English

Straight Is the Way is a 1934 American drama film directed by Paul Sloane, written by Bernard Schubert, and starring Franchot Tone, May Robson, Karen Morley, Gladys George, Nat Pendleton and Jack La Rue. It is based upon the stage play by Dana Burnet and George Abbott. It was released on August 10, 1934, by Metro-Goldwyn-Mayer.

== Cast ==
- Franchot Tone as Benny
- May Robson as Mrs. Horowitz
- Karen Morley as Bertha
- Gladys George as Shirley
- Nat Pendleton as Skippy
- Jack La Rue as Monk
- C. Henry Gordon as Sullivan
- Raymond Hatton as Mendel
- William Bakewell as Dr. Wilkes
- John Qualen as Mr. Chapman
