= Uncle Walter's Doghouse =

Uncle Walter's Doghouse was a radio situation comedy and musical variety program broadcast on NBC from May 2, 1939, to July 8, 1942. The series was sponsored by Raleigh Cigarettes.

The host of the series was Tom Wallace who portrayed Uncle Walter. Charles Penman, Kathryn Card and Beryl Vaughn appeared in the roles of father, mother and daughter in The Wiggins Family comedy segments. Gordon and Bud Vandover appeared with Marlin Hurt as the Tom, Dick and Harry vocal trio. Music was provided by the orchestras of Phil Davis and Bob Strong.

In 1939-41 shows, Virginia Verrill was the vocalist with the Doghouse Chorus and Charles Lyon announcing.

In 1941–42, the featured vocalist was Mary Ann Mercer with Bill Demling and Florence Gill.
