= The Gay Deception =

1935 film by William Wyler

- Theatrical release poster
- Directed by: William Wyler
- Written by: Stephen Morehouse Avery; Don Hartman; Patterson McNutt (uncredited contributor to treatment); Samson Raphaelson (uncredited contributor to dialogue); Arthur Richman (uncredited additional dialogue)
- Produced by: Jesse L. Lasky
- Starring: Francis Lederer; Frances Dee
- Cinematography: Joseph Valentine
- Edited by: Robert L. Simpson
- Production company: Fox Film Corporation
- Distributed by: 20th Century-Fox
- Release date: September 13, 1935
- Running time: 75-77 minutes
- Country: United States
- Language: English

The Gay Deception is a 1935 romantic comedy film starring Francis Lederer and Frances Dee. Writers Stephen Morehouse Avery and Don Hartman were nominated for the Academy Award for Best Story.

== Plot ==
Secretary Mirabel Miller wins a lottery and decides to live it up in The Waldorf-Plaza, a luxurious New York hotel, where she clashes with a bellboy who is more than he appears to be.

== Cast ==
- Francis Lederer as Sandro (Prince Alessandro)
- Frances Dee as Mirabel Miller
- Benita Hume as Miss Cordelia Channing
- Alan Mowbray as Lord Clewe
- Lennox Pawle as Consul-General Semanek
- Adele St. Mauer as Lucille (as Adele St. Maur)
- Akim Tamiroff as Spellek
- Luis Alberni as Ernest
- Lionel Stander as Gettel
- Ferdinand Gottschalk as Mr. Squires
- Richard Carle as Mr. Spitzer
- Lenita Lane as Peg DeForrest
- Barbara Fritchie as Joan Dennison
- Paul Hurst as Bell Captain
- Robert Greig as Adolph

== Reception ==
Variety said, "William Wyler directed and is a happy selection for this type of story and cast. Casting has been done with a keen sense of appreciation for humor."

== Home media ==
The film was released on DVD on April 7, 2014.
