= The Bride Wore Red =

1937 film by Dorothy Arzner

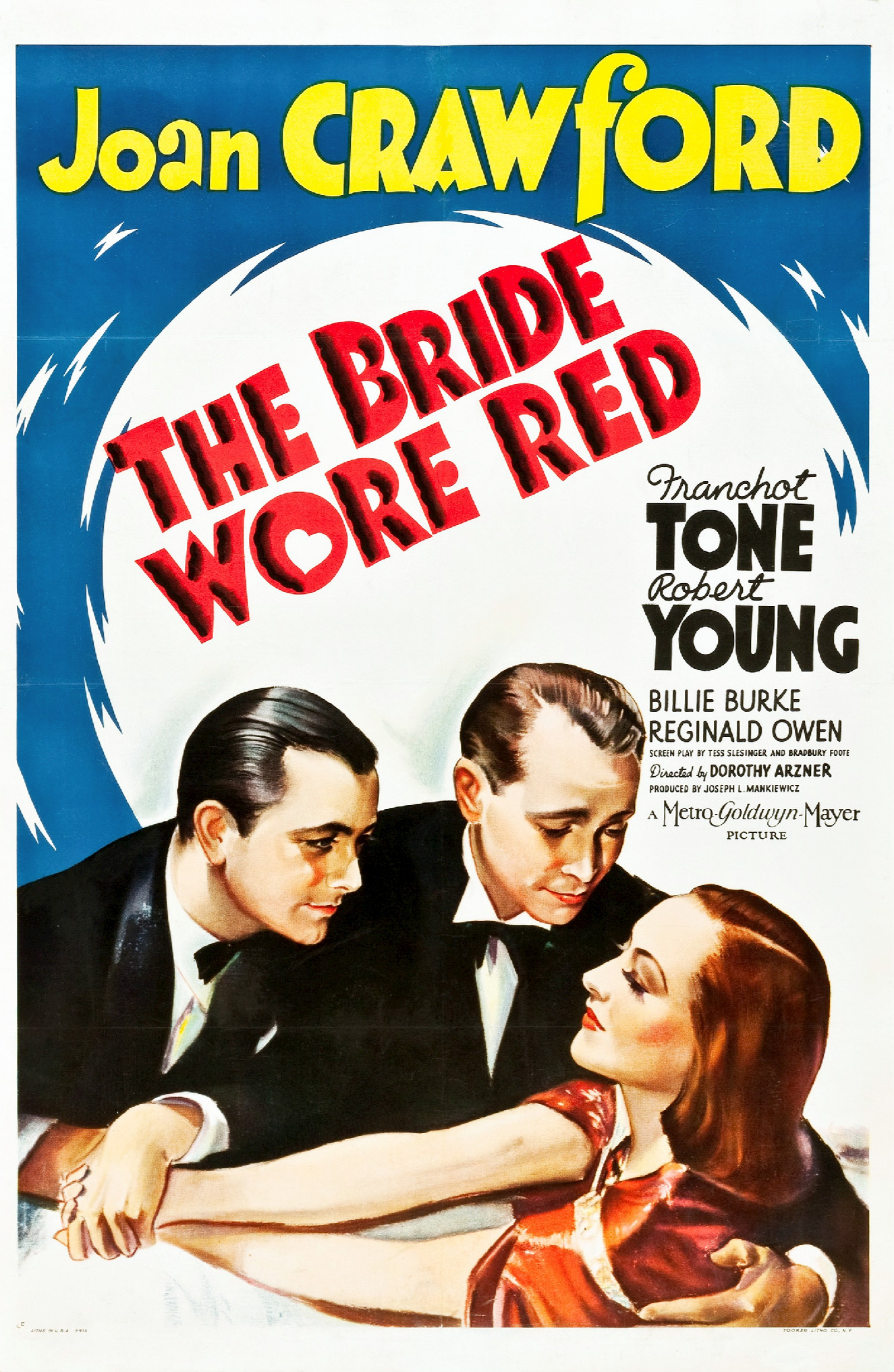
- Theatrical release poster
- Directed by: Dorothy Arzner
- Written by: Tess Slesinger; Bradbury Foote; Waldo Salt (uncredited); Catherine Turney (uncredited)
- Based on: The Bride from Trieste play by Ferenc Molnár
- Produced by: Joseph L. Mankiewicz
- Starring: Joan Crawford; Franchot Tone; Robert Young; Billie Burke
- Cinematography: George J. Folsey
- Edited by: Adrienne Fazan
- Music by: Franz Waxman
- Production company: Metro-Goldwyn-Mayer
- Distributed by: Loew's Inc.
- Release date: October 15, 1937
- Running time: 103 minutes
- Country: United States
- Language: English
- Budget: $960,000
- Box office: $1,277,000

The Bride Wore Red is a 1937 American romantic comedy drama film directed by Dorothy Arzner, and starring Joan Crawford, Franchot Tone, Robert Young and Billie Burke. It was based on the unproduced play The Bride from Trieste by Ferenc Molnár. In this "rags to riches" tale, Crawford plays a cabaret singer who poses as an aristocrat. This film is the last of the seven films that Crawford and co-star Franchot Tone, then her husband, made together.

== Plot ==
In a Trieste casino, the cynical Count Armalia tells his friend Rudi Pal that life is “a great roulette wheel”. Luck is the only thing separating aristocrats and waiters.. Later, in “the lowest dive in Trieste” he tells Rudi that if he had one of the girls “washed, dressed and coiffured” Rudi could not tell the difference between one of the “poor things” (prostitution is implied) and his fiancée. Rudi leaves, and the Count decides to prove his point. He offers the singer, Anni Pavlovitch, money, a wardrobe and a two-week stay at Terrano, an elegant resort in the Tyrol. She will be Anne Vivaldi, the fictional daughter of a fictional naval officer. Anni's one condition: a red evening dress.

When Anni arrives at the Terrano train station, she gets a ride to the hotel from Giulio, a philosophical and poetical postman who has no ambition, no desire for wealth, and is not impressed by her haughty attitude. The hotel manager greets Anni effusively: The Count has arranged everything.

The maid turns out to be Anni's old friend, Maria. One day, Maria looked into a mirror and was frightened by the wrinkles and heavy makeup that foretold her “finish.” She has built a new, happy life at the hotel. Maria is suspicious of the Count and warns Anni to be careful and correct. She is horrified by Anni's beloved new evening dress, a mass of red beads. “You might as well wear a sign,” she says, grimly.

That evening, dressed in pale lace, Anni struggles with the menu and table service until a waiter helps her, discreetly. Rudi is dining with his fiancée, Maddalena Monti; her father, Admiral Monti; and the Contessa di Meina. Rudi and the Admiral are both attracted to Anni. The Admiral sends her a note. Thinking it is from Rudi, she coolly tears it up. Rudi apologizes, explains, and invites her to join their party. The Admiral pretends to know her, Rudi asks her to dance, and the Contessa warns Maddalena: “Watch out!”

Rudi falls in love with Anni, mystified by the difference between her behavior at the hotel and her wild freedom in the woods. Giulio, clearly in love, is also confused.

Hoping to lure Rudi into a proposal, Anni extends her stay.

The Contessa, who has been suspicious from the beginning, wires Armalia. His reply—he had forgotten all about his experiment with the cabaret girl—comes through Giulio. On the way to deliver it, Giulio meets Anni, and they go to his cottage. She tells him a long lie about her past, and breaks down. She loves him, but marriage to Rudi would bring the life she craves. Later, she falls, and Giulio loses the telegram while helping her.

At the costume party, Anni snubs Giulio when he offers her edelweiss, a symbol of devoted love found only in remote, dangerous mountain heights. “He must have risked his life for those flowers,” the Contessa says. Rudi finally proposes, after she refuses to be his mistress. She confesses to Giulio that she loves him—but she will marry Rudi the next day because she can live without love but will never again live with hunger.

The next day, Rudi tells Maddalena that he loves Anni. She steps aside, suggesting that they dine together that evening, and then bursts into tears. While Maria helps Anni pack, Anni decides to wear the red dress. Maria tells her that she no longer has a heart and that the gaudy red is what she is really like. “You can't remember the waterfront because you are still there.”

During dinner, Giulio brings a copy of the telegram to the hotel; the bellboy delivers it to the Contessa, who shows it to the others. Maddalena is genuinely sympathetic. Anni tells Rudi that he should marry his childhood sweetheart.

Anni runs to Maria for comfort, but soon realizes that she is relieved. She leaves the hotel, taking only her peasant costume and a long cloak. Giulio is happily waiting for her.

== Cast ==
- Joan Crawford as Anni Pavlovitch
- Franchot Tone as Giulio
- Robert Young as Rudi Pal
- Billie Burke as Contessa di Meina
- Reginald Owen as Admiral Monti
- Lynne Carver as Maddelena Monti
- George Zucco as Count Armalia
- Mary Philips as Maria
- Paul Porcasi as Signor Nobili
- Dickie Moore as Pietro
- Frank Puglia as Alberto
- Adriana Caselotti as First Peasant Girl
- Jean Lewis as Second Peasant Girl
- Ann Rutherford as Third Peasant Girl

== Gallery ==
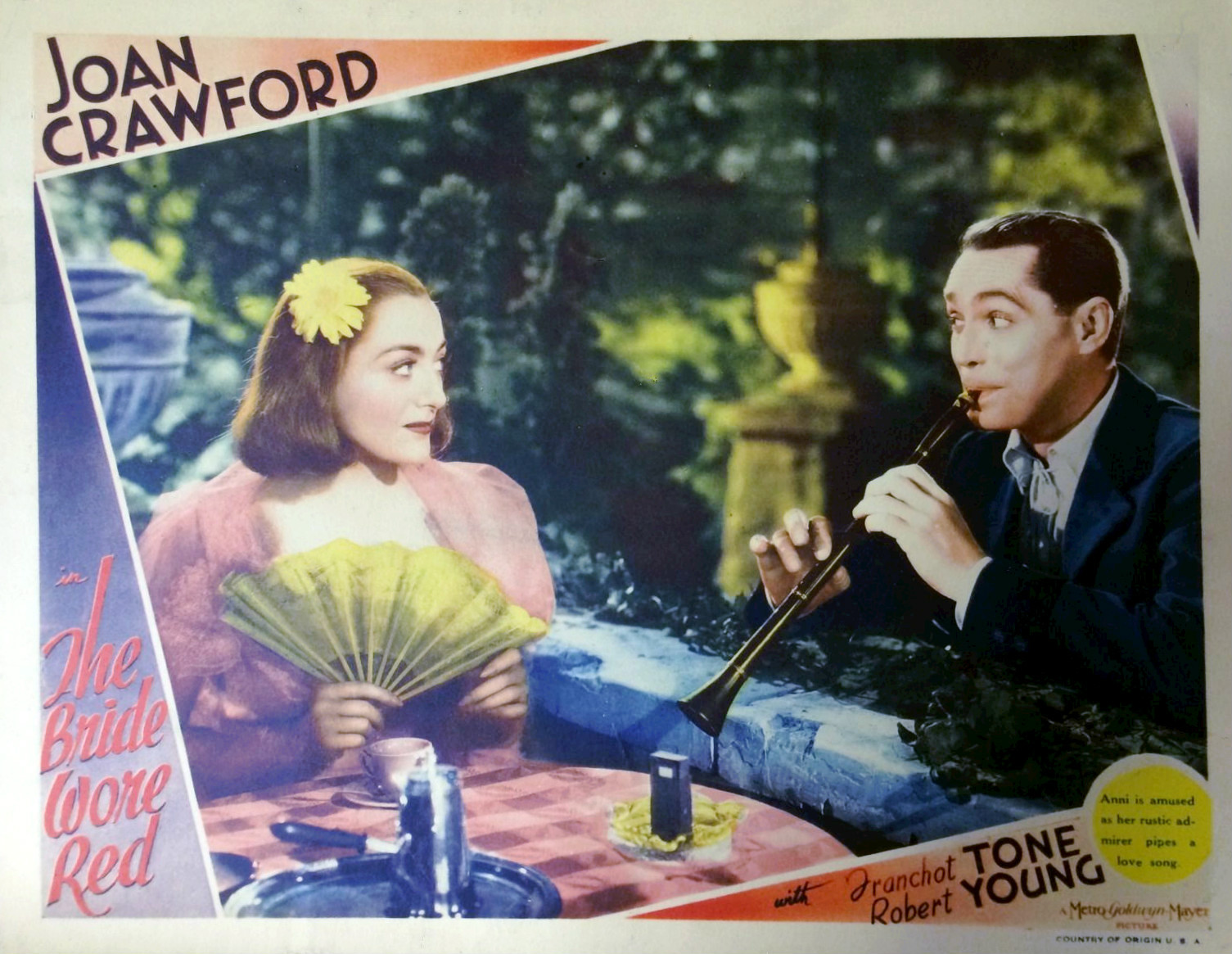

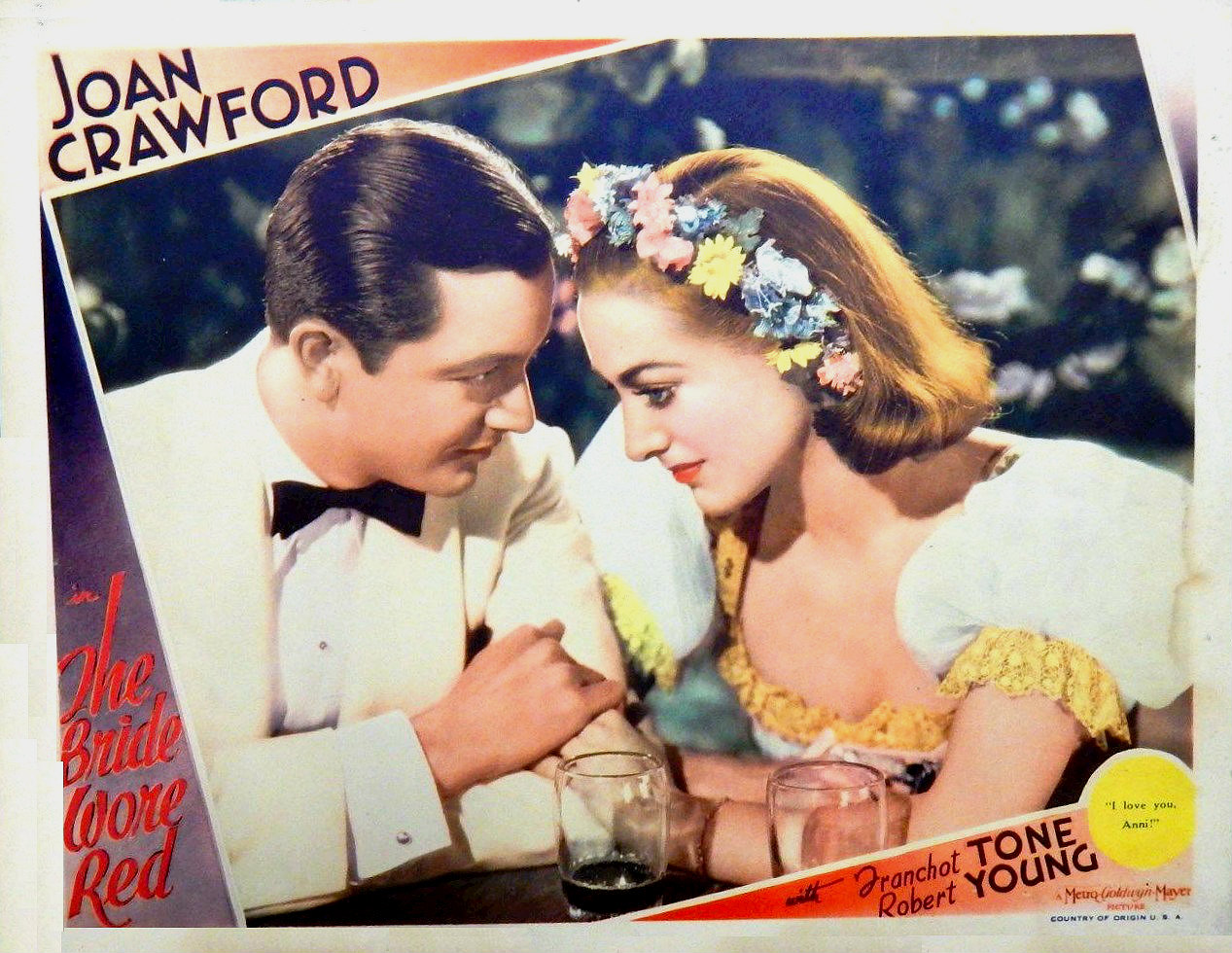

== Reception ==
Howard Barnes of the New York Herald Tribune wrote, "Joan Crawford has a glamorous field day in The Bride Wore Red.... With a new hair-do and more wide-eyed than ever, she plays at being a slattern, a fine lady, and a peasant with all of the well-known Crawford sorcery. It is not entirely her fault that she always remains herself. [The film] has no dramatic conviction and little of the comic flavor that might have made it amusing though slight. Your enjoyment of it will depend on how much of Miss Crawford you can take at one stretch.... The direction of Dorothy Arzner is always interesting and sometimes...is extraordinarily imaginative, but here she has not been able to give a vapid Cinderella pipe dream more than a handsome pictorial front."

== Box office ==
Produced at an estimated cost of $960,000, the film grossed an estimated total of $1,277,000: $852,000 from the U.S. and Canada and $425,000 in other markets. It recorded a loss of $271,000.[1]
