= Reckless (1935 film) =

1935 American musical film directed by Victor Fleming

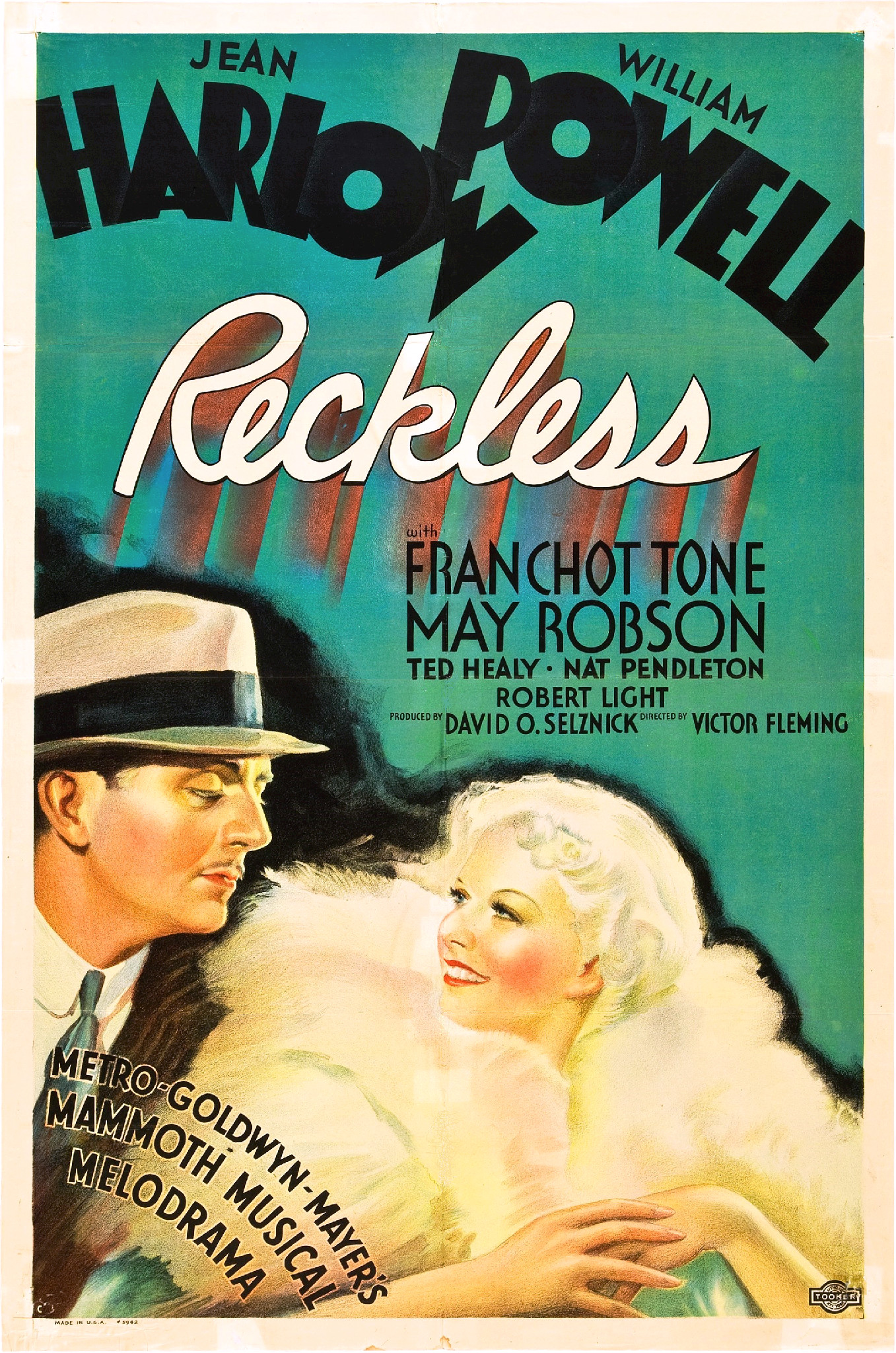
- Directed by: Victor Fleming
- Screenplay by: P. J. Wolfson
- Story by: Oliver Jeffries
- Produced by: David O. Selznick
- Starring: Jean Harlow; William Powell; Franchot Tone; May Robson
- Cinematography: George J. Folsey
- Edited by: Margaret Booth
- Production company: Metro-Goldwyn-Mayer
- Distributed by: Loew's Inc.
- Release date: April 19, 1935
- Running time: 97 minutes
- Country: United States
- Language: English
- Budget: $858,000
- Box office: $1,339,000

Reckless (also known as Born Reckless and Hard to Handle) is a 1935 American musical film directed by Victor Fleming and starring Jean Harlow, William Powell, Franchot Tone, and May Robson. David O. Selznick wrote the story, using the pseudonym Oliver Jeffries, basing it loosely on the scandal of the 1931 marriage between torch singer Libby Holman and tobacco heir Zachary Smith Reynolds, and his death by a gunshot wound to the head.

== Plot ==
Musical stage star Mona Leslie, jailed for reckless driving, is bailed out by her friend, sports promoter, and gambler Ned Riley, to headline a charity event. However, she finds that all the seats have been bought by wealthy Bob Harrison Jr., president and only member of S.A.M.L. (the Society for the Admiration of Mona Leslie). Mona begins dating Bob, with Ned's approval. Mona's Granny tells Ned that her granddaughter would break off her relationship with Bob if he asked her to. Ned is reluctant at first, but eventually buys a wedding ring. However, he is too late.

One night, while they are very drunk, Mona and Bob get married. The next day, Mona is pleased, but Bob becomes depressed when he considers what his upper class friends and family will think, especially his father, Colonel Harrison, and his fiancée and friend since childhood, Jo Mercer. Though Jo welcomes Mona without resentment, the colonel and the rest of Bob's social circle are cold toward her. Bob wants to run back to New York, but Mona advises him to stay and stick it out.

Bob's ambivalent feelings emerge when Jo gets married. He avoids the wedding and starts drinking, unable to endure the thought of Jo with another man. When he shows up and speaks to Jo privately, he tells her how he really feels. Mona overhears when he says he was trapped into marriage. With no place else to go, she asks Ned to take her to his hotel suite. Bob follows and tries to pick a fight, but is too drunk to do anything serious. Ned and Mona put him to bed, but when they leave the room, Bob kills himself. Both Ned and Mona are subjected to a coroner's inquest and suspected of murder, but Bob's death is ruled a suicide. However, in the eyes of the public, Mona is still guilty of driving Bob to his death.

Mona gives birth to Bob's son. She offers to give up her inheritance of one million dollars if Colonel Harrison will agree not to seek custody of her child. He agrees. To support her son, Mona tries to go back to work, but outraged people organize a campaign against her and nobody will hire her other than a sleazy promoter who wants to take advantage of her notoriety. Ned secretly finances a show for her, but his lawyer, worried that Ned is risking bankruptcy, tells Mona. She offers to stop production, but Ned refuses to listen and the show goes on.

On opening night, Jo and Colonel Harrison are in the audience. Mona starts off with a song, but hecklers make it impossible to continue. She quiets the crowd with a forceful justification of her actions and starts over. When she is finished, the audience gives her a standing ovation. During her next song, Ned proposes to her from the sideline.

== Cast ==
- Jean Harlow as Mona Leslie
- William Powell as Ned Riley
- Franchot Tone as Bob Harrison
- May Robson as Granny
- Ted Healy as Smiley
- Nat Pendleton as Blossom
- Rosalind Russell as Jo
- Mickey Rooney as Eddie
- Henry Stephenson as Harrison
- Man-Mountain Dean as himself
- Robert Light as Paul Mercer
- Allan Jones as Allan
- Carl Randall as himself
- Nina Mae McKinney appears as herself
- Leon Ames as Ralph Watson
- Allen 'Farina' Hoskins as Gold Dust

== Music ==
Jean Harlow's voice was dubbed by vocalist Virginia Verrill who also performed songs in Suzy and The Goldwyn Follies. Harlow later sang the title track for a radio broadcast in January 1935.

1. "Reckless" - Virginia Verrill
2. "Trocadero" (music by Burton Lane, lyrics by Harold Adamson) - Virginia Verrill and Allan Jones
3. "Ev'rything's Been Done Before" (music by Jack King, lyrics by Adamson and Edwin Knopf) - Allan Jones
4. "Hear What My Heart Is Saying" (by Lane and Adamson) - Virginia Verrill

== Production ==
Reckless had several working titles including Salute, There Goes Romance, and A Woman Called Cheap. Ten writers, including Joseph Mankiewicz, Philip Barry, S. N. Behrman, and Val Lewton had some involvement, but only P. J. Wolfson gained a credit for the final script. Joan Crawford was cast as the lead. However, one week before production Harlow replaced Crawford, as David O. Selznick had decided that Powell's real-life romance with Harlow would help to publicize the film. Harlow was reluctant to be in the film as her husband Paul Bern (like the husband of her character Mona Leslie) had committed suicide two years earlier.

Principal photography on Reckless began on November 27, 1934 and wrapped mid-February 1935.

== Reception ==
=== Box office ===
Reckless earned $1,339,000 worldwide, including $847,000 in the US and Canada, on a budget of $858,000. Despite this, the film lost $125,000.

=== Critical response ===
==== Contemporary ====
Reckless was given a mainly positive review by Helen Brown Norden for Vanity Fair, though she questioned whether Jean Harlow actually sang in the film: "However, whoever does sing, does it nicely enough, and Miss Harlow moves her lips in tempo and sways her hips with magnificent aplomb. William Powell is his customary slick self as a racetrack gambler and sport promoter, and Franchot Tone plays a wealthy cad in amiable fashion. A nice bit is turned in by Rosalind Russell, who has poise, chic and breeding which augur an interesting future in Hollywood."

Andre Sennwald reviewed the film for The New York Times. He considered the film possessed "happy casting" in that Harlow and Powell could have been an exciting duo. His review, however, observed: "It would be pleasant to report that Reckless is the whirlwind comedy which such a merger would lead us to expect. But reporters are chained to facts, and this morning's bulletin from the Capitol is mournful. Metro-Goldwyn-Mayer has taken the screen's liveliest comedienne and chased her through a stale and profitless meringue of backstage routines and high society amour."

Writing for Maclean's Magazine, Ann Ross considered the film a "cheap story" but Jean Harlow's performance was "persuasive" and "reasonably honest".

==== Retrospective ====
Online Film Critics Society critic Dennis Schwartz gives the film a B grade, calling it "a predictable but enjoyable romantic comedy." Derek Winnert assigns the film 3 stars.
