= Phyllis Avery =

American actress (1922–2011)

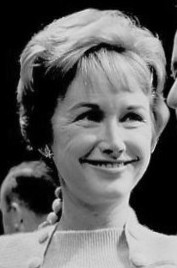
- Avery in the 1950s
- Born: November 14, 1922; New York, New York, U.S.
- Died: May 19, 2011 (aged 88); Los Angeles, California, U.S.
- Occupation: Actress
- Spouses: James Howell Van Campen (m. 1942; div. 1944) Don Taylor (m. 1944; div. 1956)
- Children: 2, with Don Taylor
- Parent: Stephen Morehouse Avery (father)

Phyllis Avery (November 14, 1922 – May 19, 2011) was an American actress.

== Early life ==
Phyllis Avery was born to screenwriter Stephen Morehouse Avery and his wife, Evelyn Martine Avery. She grew up in France and Los Angeles.

== Career ==
Avery completed her training at the American Academy of Dramatic Arts in New York City. She had previously made her Broadway debut in May 1937, with the role of Goldie in the musical Orchids Preferred. In 1940/1941 she appeared on Broadway in the successful comedy Charley's Aunt. She played alongside José Ferrer the role of Amy Spettigue, one of the young naive girls. From November 1943 to May 1944, she played the role of Dorothy Ross on Broadway in the musical play Winged Victory by Moss Hart, a production of the US Army Air Forces, in over 200 performances. One of her partners was actor/filmmaker Don Taylor, whom Avery later married.

Avery made her film debut in 1951 with the role of the young girl Marjorie in the film comedy Queen for a Day. In 1952, she played the role of Tracy McAuliffe, the wife of the movie character Boake Tackman embodied by Charlton Heston, in the Twentieth Century-Fox film drama Ruby Gentry. In 1956, along with Gordon MacRae, Ernest Borgnine, and Dan Dailey, she was part of the cast for the musical The Best Things in Life Are Free, a film biography of three composers. She portrayed Margaret Henderson, the wife of music teacher and composer Ray Henderson.

Despite a few more film roles, Avery worked primarily as a television actress beginning in the 1950s. She appeared in continuous series roles, episode roles, and guest roles in a total of over 40 television series. From 1953 to 1955, she played Peggy McNutley, Ray Milland's wife in the US sitcom Meet Mr. McNutley. From 1960 to 1962, she took on the role of Anne Shelby in the soap opera The Clear Horizon; in it she played the wife of a U.S. astronaut stationed at Cape Canaveral Air Force Station, who was attracted to another man.

She made appearances in the television series Richard Diamond, Private Detective (1957–1959),Trackdown (1957), Perry Mason (1958; 1961), The Rifleman (1959), Rawhide (1959), Peter Gunn (1960), Have Gun Will Travel (1962), Laramie (1960; 1963), The Virginian (1963), Dr. Kildare (1963), Daniel Boone (1967), All in the Family (1973), Maude (1976), Charlie's Angels (1977), and Baretta (1978). In the late 1970s, Avery ended her career as an actress. She returned to the camera for some sporadic film and television roles in the 1990s, including the comedy film Made in America, the comedy series Coach, and the 1999 film The Secret Life of Girls.

== Personal life and death ==
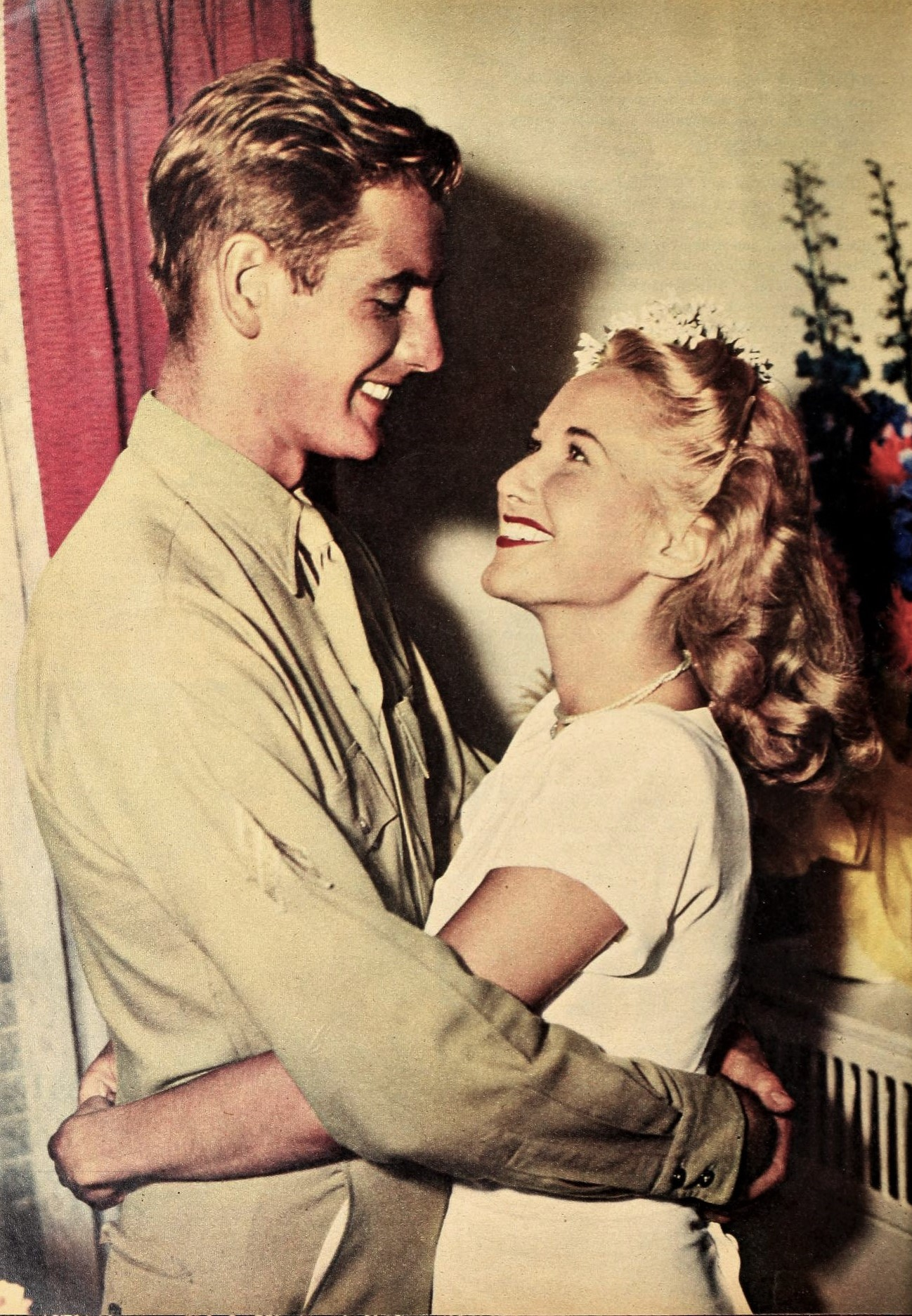
Avery (right) with Don Taylor, 1946

Avery married James Howell Van Campen in 1942; they divorced in 1944. Later that same year, she married actor Don Taylor, whom she had met in the Broadway production "Winged Victory"; they divorced in 1955. The marriage resulted in two daughters.

Avery died on May 19, 2011, at the age of 88, in her home in Los Angeles of heart failure. She had worked in and around Los Angeles as a real estate broker from the 1960s onward.
