= Suzy (film) =

1936 film by George Fitzmaurice

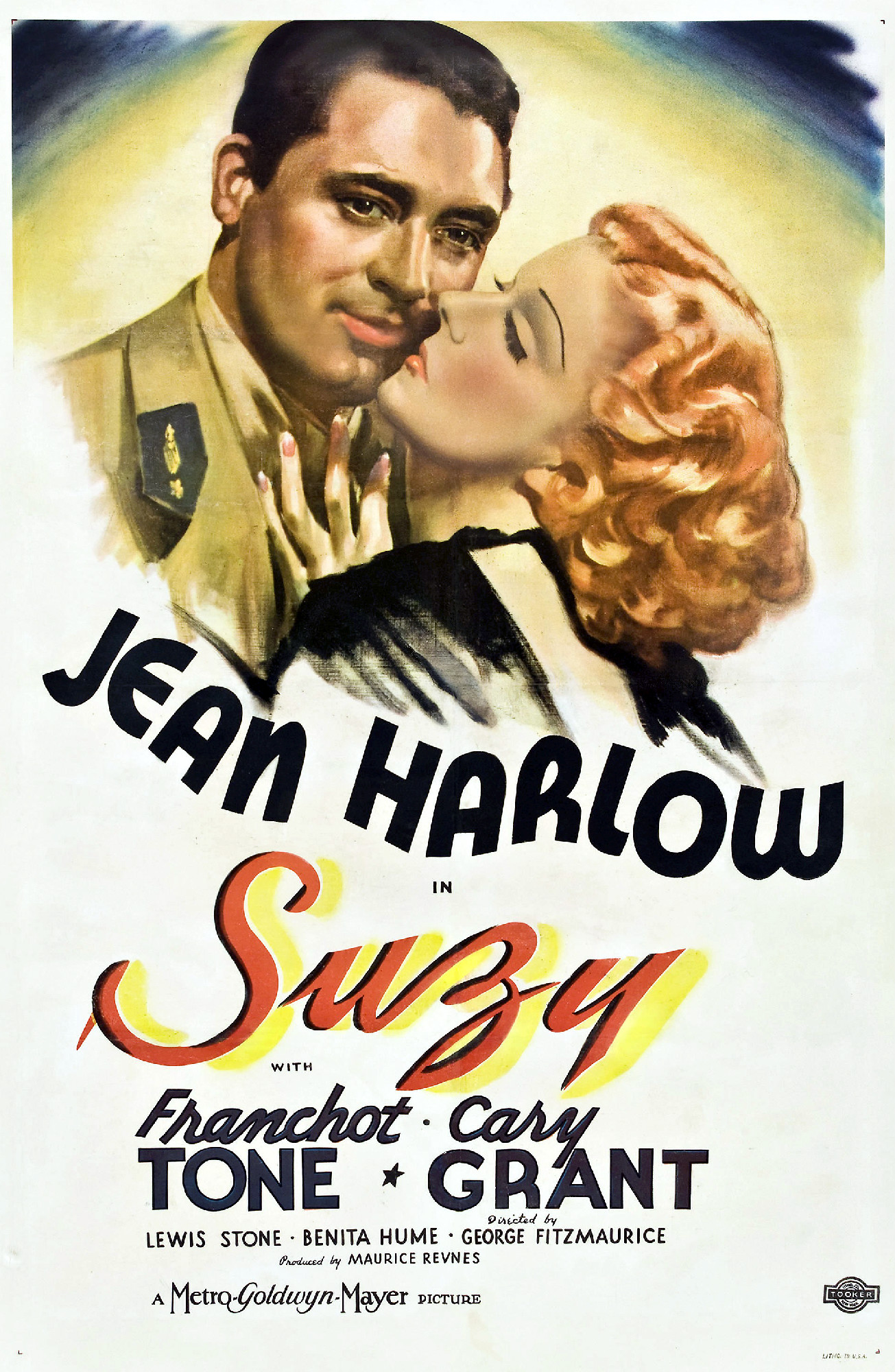
- Theatrical release poster
- Directed by: George Fitzmaurice
- Screenplay by: Dorothy Parker; Alan Campbell; Horace Jackson; Lenore J. Coffee
- Based on: Suzy; 1934 novel by Herbert Gorman
- Produced by: Maurice Revnes
- Starring: Jean Harlow; Franchot Tone; Cary Grant
- Cinematography: Ray June
- Edited by: George Boemler
- Music by: William Axt
- Production company: Metro-Goldwyn-Mayer
- Distributed by: Metro-Goldwyn-Mayer
- Release date: July 20, 1936
- Running time: 93 minutes
- Country: United States
- Language: English

Suzy is a 1936 American drama film directed by George Fitzmaurice and starring Jean Harlow, Franchot Tone and Cary Grant. The film was partially written by Dorothy Parker, based on a novel by Herbert Gorman. The Academy Award-nominated theme for Suzy, "Did I Remember?", was sung by Virginia Verrill (uncredited).

== Plot ==
In 1914, American showgirl Suzanne Trent is in London, hoping to meet and marry a man with money. She tells her friend Maisie she can charm any man she chooses into marrying her, and then learn to love him.

She sets her sights on Terry Moore, an Irishman she sees in a borrowed Rolls-Royce. She soon learns he is not wealthy, but he has a respectable job and good prospects, being an engineer, inventor, and pilot. They quickly fall in love and marry. But then they stumble on a German plot, and her husband is shot by a mysterious woman, who leaves immediately. The landlady arrives moments later and hysterically calls for police, accusing Suzy of murder. Suzy also flees the scene, and therefore does not learn that Terry is expected to survive.

Maisie has moved to Paris, and Suzy now follows her, taking a job at the same cabaret just before World War I begins.

Thinking she is a widow, Suzy is heartbroken, until she meets the famed French flying ace Andre Charville at the cabaret. They quickly fall in love and get married. Andre's aristocratic father, Baron Edward Charville, welcomes Suzy into the family home, but is concerned about the whirlwind romance and marriage because Andre has had many short-lived relationships with women. After Andre is recalled to the front, Suzy bonds with the old man, even inventing letters from Andre that she pretends to read to him.

The Baron's concern was justified: when Andre returns briefly to Paris, he is more interested in socializing with his fellow pilots—and their girlfriends—than taking the opportunity to see the wife he has not even told them about. The Baron covers for him, but makes sure Andre and Suzy do meet for a few minutes as he returns to the front.

Andre is wounded in action, and Suzy goes to comfort him. There she is shocked to meet Terry, who is delivering to Andre's squadron new British fighters he helped design. She explains to Terry what happened, but tells him she now loves Andre. Terry is incensed at her for not telling Andre she was already married to him, and for having run away. He assumes she never loved him.

Suzy goes to Andre to tell him the truth—and has another shock, finding him in a compromising position with the woman who shot Terry. Unable to think clearly, she returns home to Paris, where she finds a magazine photo of Andre with the woman. Her name is Diane Eyrelle, and she has been "caring for" Andre during his recovery. Obviously, she is actually spying on him. Suzy returns to the air base and tells Terry what she has learned. He is dubious but agrees to take action. Suzy points out that as Andre is a public figure, for the sake of morale they should try to avoid damaging his reputation. They confront Andre first, but Diane overhears them, and as the four argue, her henchman comes in and shoots Andre.

Andre was about to return to active service and is scheduled to take off immediately on a dangerous mission. Terry says he can fetch a doctor or take over the flight, but has no time to do both. Andre says to fly the mission.

Terry takes his revenge, killing Diane and her henchman by strafing their car, then shooting down the German fighters meant to ambush Andre. He deliberately passes the airfield and crashes into a tree in front of the chateau, where Andre now lies dead. Suzy and Terry move his body so it will seem he died in the crash.

At the funeral that follows, a German flyer drops a bouquet in homage.

Terry is asked to escort the ace's widow back to Paris.

== Cast ==
- Jean Harlow as Suzanne "Suzy" Trent
- Franchot Tone as Capt. Terry Moore
- Cary Grant as Capt. Andre Charville
- Lewis Stone as Baron Edward Charville
- Benita Hume as Madame Diane Eyrelle
- Reginald Mason as Captain Barsanges
- Inez Courtney as Maisie aka "Frostbite"
- Greta Meyer as Mrs. Schmidt
- David Clyde as Knobby McPherson
- Christian Rub as "Pop" Gaspard, the Pianist
- George Spelvin as Gaston
- Una O'Connor as Mrs. Bradley, Suzy's Landlady
- Theodore von Eltz as Revue Producer
- Dennis Morgan as Lieutenant Charbret
- Tyler Brooke as Raoul
- Robert Livingston as Pierre
- Frank Dawson as Albert
- Ferdinand Gottschalk as Proprietor of Café Anges
- Joseph R. Tozer as Colonel
- Harry Cording as Madame Eyrelle's Chauffeur
- Tempe Pigott as Old Woman Getting Police
- Luana Walters as Check Room Girl

== Production ==
Dorothy Parker was notable as one of the screenwriting team, with much of the early scenes’ witty dialogue attributed to her. Harlow's cabaret song, Walter Donaldson and Harold Adamson's "Did I Remember (To Tell You I Adored You)" was dubbed by vocalist Virginia Verrill who also had dubbed for her in Reckless (1935). Grant, who replaced Clark Gable as the third lead, also sang a few bars of the song. Other songs included: "When You Wore a Tulip and I Wore a Big Red Rose" and "Under the Bamboo Tree", uncredited but sung by Verrill.

In order to film the aerial sequences, footage was leased from Howard Hughes and one scene was directly lifted from Hell's Angels (1930), which had been Harlow's break-through film. A number of aircraft were prominently seen, including Andre's S.E.5 fighter, German Fokker D.VII and Thomas-Morse S-4 fighters as well as a rare Sikorsky S-29-A airliner filling in as a German Gotha bomber.

== Reception ==
Although Harlow dominates the film, it is not considered one of her finest, with a mundane plot and only the Grant and Tone roles being notable. Critic Frank S. Nugent of The New York Times considered it hackneyed, as "...it plunges across the screen, creates some mild excitement and careens out again, leaving us with a few esthetic bruises and a feeling that a little fresh air would do no harm."

== Accolades ==
Walter Donaldson (music) and Harold Adamson (lyrics) were nominated in the category, Best Music, Original Song for the song "Did I Remember" at the 1937 Academy Awards.
