= Franchot Tone =

American actor and director (1905–1968)

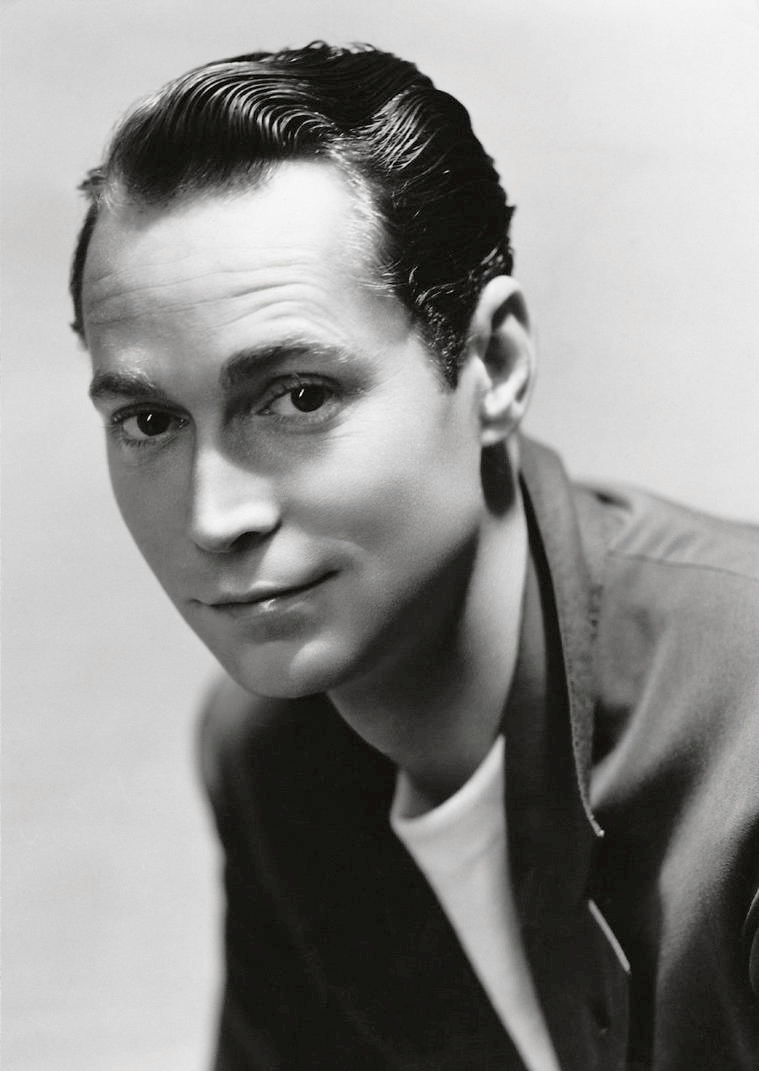
- Tone in 1938
- Born: Stanislaus Pascal Franchot Tone; February 27, 1905; Niagara Falls, New York, U.S.
- Died: September 18, 1968 (aged 63); New York City, U.S.
- Education: Cornell University
- Occupations: Actor; producer; director
- Years active: 1926–1968
- Spouses: Joan Crawford (m. 1935; div. 1939) Jean Wallace (m. 1941; div. 1948) Barbara Payton (m. 1951; div. 1952) Dolores Dorn (m. 1956; div. 1959)
- Children: 2

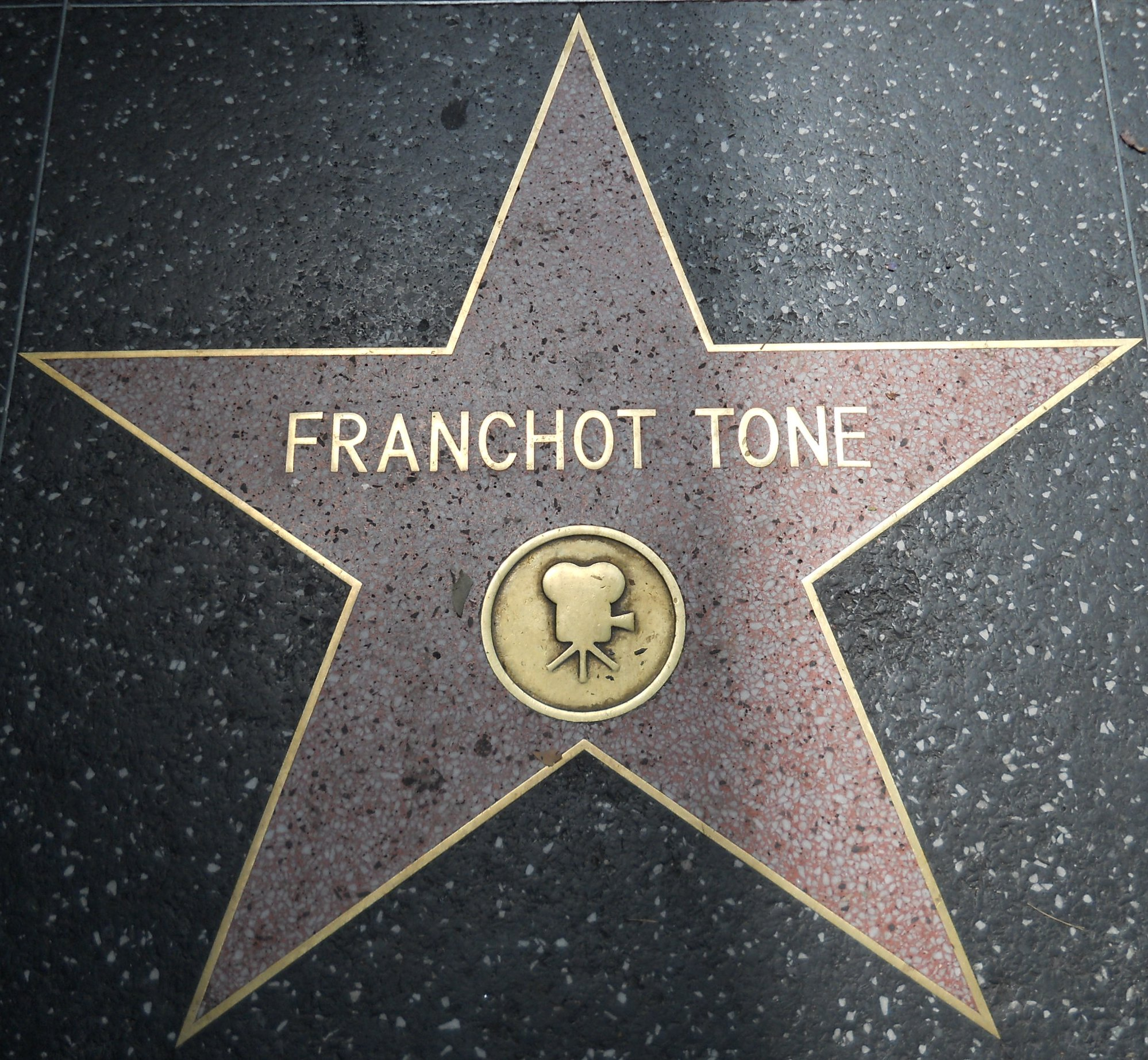
Hollywood Walk of Fame star at 6558 Hollywood Blvd.

Stanislaus Pascal Franchot Tone (February 27, 1905 – September 18, 1968) was an American actor, producer, and director of stage, film and television. He was a leading man in the 1930s and early 1940s, and at the height of his career was known for his gentlemanly sophisticate roles, with supporting roles by the 1950s. His acting crossed many genres including pre-Code romantic leads to noir layered roles and World War I films. He appeared as a guest star in episodes of several golden age television series, including The Twilight Zone and The Alfred Hitchcock Hour while continuing to act and produce in the theater and movies throughout the 1960s.

Tone was nominated for an Academy Award for Best Actor for his role as Midshipman Roger Byam in Mutiny on the Bounty (1935), along with his co-stars Clark Gable and Charles Laughton, making it the only film to have three simultaneous Best Actor nominations, and leading to the creation of the Best Supporting Actor category.

For his contribution to the motion picture industry, Tone received a star on the Hollywood Walk of Fame. Placed February 8, 1960, it is located at 6558 Hollywood Boulevard.

== Early life and education ==
Stanislaus Pascal Franchot Tone was born in Niagara Falls, New York, the youngest son of Dr. Frank Jerome Tone, the wealthy president of the Carborundum Company, and his socially prominent wife, Gertrude Van Vrancken Franchot. Tone was also a distant relative of Wolfe Tone (the "father of Irish Republicanism"). Tone was of French Canadian, Irish, Dutch and English ancestry. Through his ancestor, the nobleman Gilbert L'Homme de Basque, translated to Basque Homme and finally Bascom, he was of French Basque descent.

Tone was educated at The Hill School in Pottstown, Pennsylvania, from which he was dismissed and Niagara Falls High School. He entered Cornell University, where he was president of the drama club, acting in productions of Shakespeare. He was also elected to the Sphinx Head Society and joined the Alpha Delta Phi fraternity. After graduating in 1927, he gave up the family business to pursue an acting career, moving to Greenwich Village, New York.

== Career ==
=== 1927–1932: Broadway ===
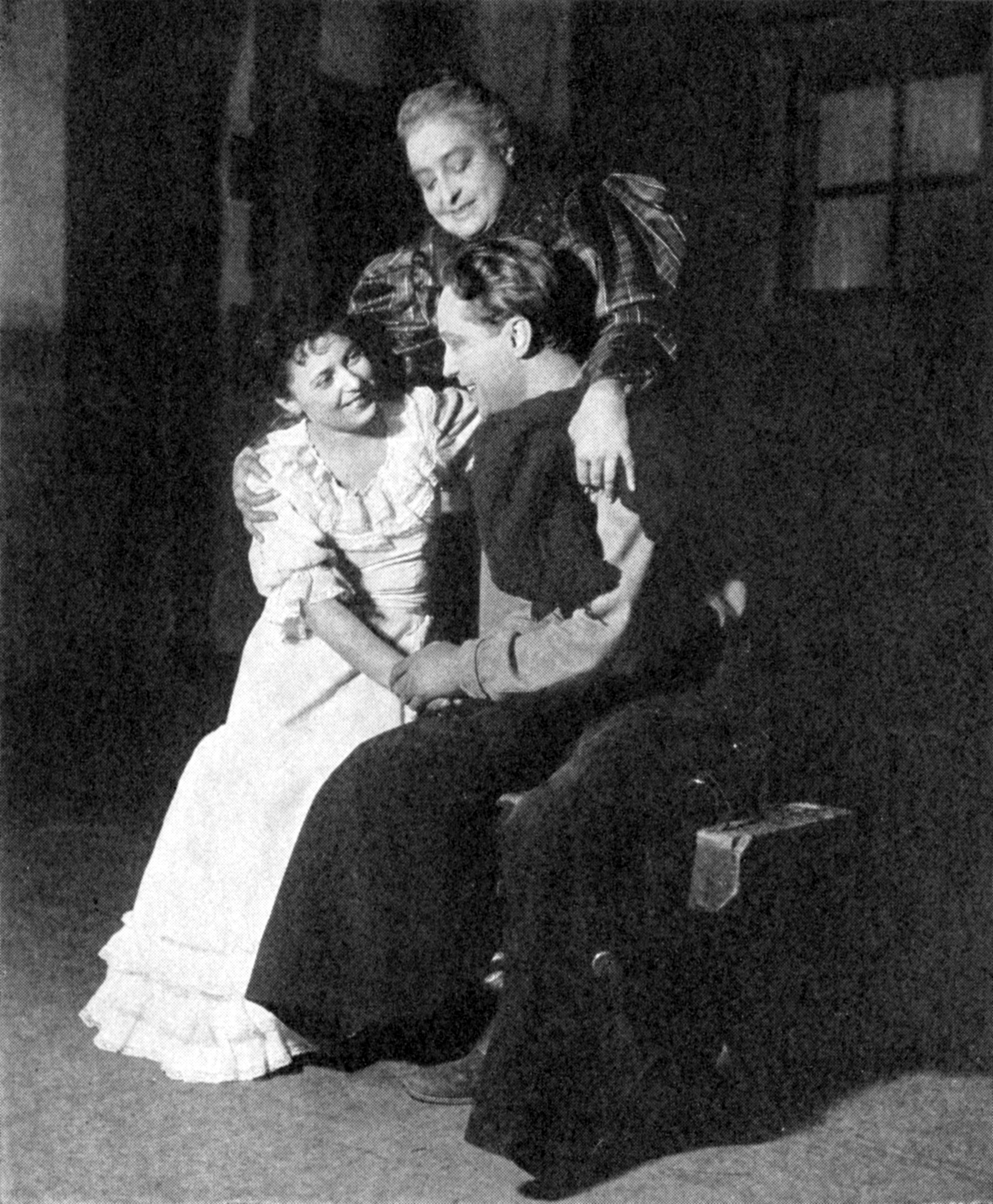
June Walker (Laurey Williams), Helen Westley (Aunt Eller Murphy) and Tone (Curly McClain) in the original Broadway production of Green Grow the Lilacs (1931)

Tone was in The Belt (1927), Centuries (1927–28), The International (1928), and a popular adaptation of The Age of Innocence (1928–29) with Katherine Cornell. He followed it with appearances in Uncle Vanya (1929), Cross Roads (1929), Red Rust (1929–30), Hotel Universe (1930), and Pagan Lady (1930–31).

He joined the Theatre Guild and played Curly in their production of Green Grow the Lilacs (1931), where Tone sang, which later became the basis for the musical Oklahoma! Robert Benchley of The New Yorker said that "Tone made lyrical love to [co-star] Walker" between the Sammy Lee chorus routines of the play. The Lynn Riggs play received mixed reviews, mostly favorable, and was a popular success lasting 64 performances on Broadway. Tone joined the Group Theatre along with other former Theatre Guild members Harold Clurman, Cheryl Crawford, Lee Strasberg, Stella Adler, and Clifford Odets. Clifford Odets recalled of Tone's acting, "The two most talented young actors I have known in the American theater in my time have been Franchot Tone and Marlon Brando, and I think Franchot was the more talented." Strasberg, who was a director in the Group during 1931–1941 and then teacher of "The Method" in the 1950s, had been a castmate of Tone's in Green Grow the Lilacs.

These were intense and productive years for him; among the productions of the Group he acted in were 1931 (1931) lasting 12 performances, Maxwell Anderson's Night Over Taos (1932) a play in verse that lasted 10, The House of Connelly (1931) lasting 91 performances and John Howard Lawson's Success Story (1932) directed by Lee Strasberg. Outside of Group productions, he was in A Thousand Summers (1932).

Tone made his film debut with The Wiser Sex (1932) starring Claudette Colbert, filmed by Paramount at their Astoria Studios.

=== 1933–1939: The MGM years ===
Tone was the first of the Group to go to Hollywood when MGM offered him a film contract. In his memoir on the Group Theater, The Fervent Years, Harold Clurman recalls Tone being the most confrontational and egocentric of the group, a "strikingly individualistic personality." Burgess Meredith credits Tone with informing him of the existence of "the Method" and what was soon to be the Actors Studio under Strasberg's teachings. Tone himself considered cinema far more invasive to private life and paced differently from theater productions. He recalled his stage years with fondness, financially supporting the Group Theater in its declining years.

MGM immediately gave Tone a series of impressive roles, casting him in six pre-Code film standards, starting in 1933 with a support role in the romantic WWI drama Today We Live, written by William Faulkner in collaboration with director Howard Hawks. The script was first conceived as a WWI buddy film, but the studio executives wanted a vehicle for their popular leading lady Joan Crawford, forcing Faulkner and Hawks to work in the romance between co-stars Gary Cooper and Crawford. Tone was then the romantic male lead in Gabriel Over the White House starring Walter Huston, followed by a lead role with Loretta Young in Midnight Mary.

Tone romanced Miriam Hopkins in King Vidor's The Stranger's Return and was the male lead in Stage Mother. He also had a role in Bombshell, with Jean Harlow and Lee Tracy. The last of the sequence of films was Dancing Lady, with an on-screen love triangle with his future wife Joan Crawford and Clark Gable, which was a "lavishly staged spectacle" with a solid performance by Tone.

Twentieth Century Pictures borrowed Tone to romance Constance Bennett in Moulin Rouge (1934) as she played dual roles in which "she shines as a comedienne" and his performance was called "equally clever in a role that calls for a serious mein" by The New York Times. Back at MGM, he was again co-starring with Crawford in Sadie McKee (1934), then was borrowed by Fox to co-star "commendably" with Madeleine Carroll in John Ford's French Foreign Legion picture, The World Moves On (1934).

After The Girl from Missouri (1934) with Harlow, MGM finally gave Tone top billing in Straight Is the Way (1934), although it was considered a "B" film, one which didn't have a high publicity or production cost. Warner Bros. then borrowed him for Gentlemen Are Born (1934).

At Paramount, Tone co-starred in the Academy Award nominated hit movie, The Lives of a Bengal Lancer (1935) with Gary Cooper. He was top billed in One New York Night (1935) but billed underneath Harlow and William Powell in Reckless (1935). He supported Crawford and Robert Montgomery in No More Ladies (1935) and had another box-office success with Mutiny on the Bounty, for which he was nominated for the Academy Award for Best Actor, along with co-stars Clark Gable and Charles Laughton.

Warner Bros. borrowed him again, this time to play Bette Davis' leading man in Dangerous (1935). After a lead role in Exclusive Story (1935), he was again paired with friend Loretta Young in The Unguarded Hour (1936), and also starred with Grace Moore in Columbia's The King Steps Out (1936), notable for the debut of an eleven-year-old Gwen Verdon.

Tone and Harlow co-starred again in Suzy (1936) with then up and comer Cary Grant, who was billed third. The film was popular with audiences, but reviews were less than kind with The New York Times negatively comparing it to other recent WWI movies calling it "balderdash", but thanked "Mr. Tone for the few honest moments of drama that the film possesses. His young Irishman is about the only convincing and natural character in the piece." He then filmed The Gorgeous Hussy (1936) with Crawford, Robert Taylor and Lionel Barrymore with co-star Beulah Bondi earning an Academy Award nomination for the Andrew Jackson period piece. A Crawford and Gable film capitalizing on It Happened One Night by casting the pair in roles as fast talking journalists in Love on the Run (1936), found Tone in a supporting role.

RKO borrowed him to appear opposite Katharine Hepburn in Quality Street (1937), a costume drama that lost $248,000 at the box office. Back at MGM he supported Spencer Tracy and Gladys George in They Gave Him a Gun (1937).

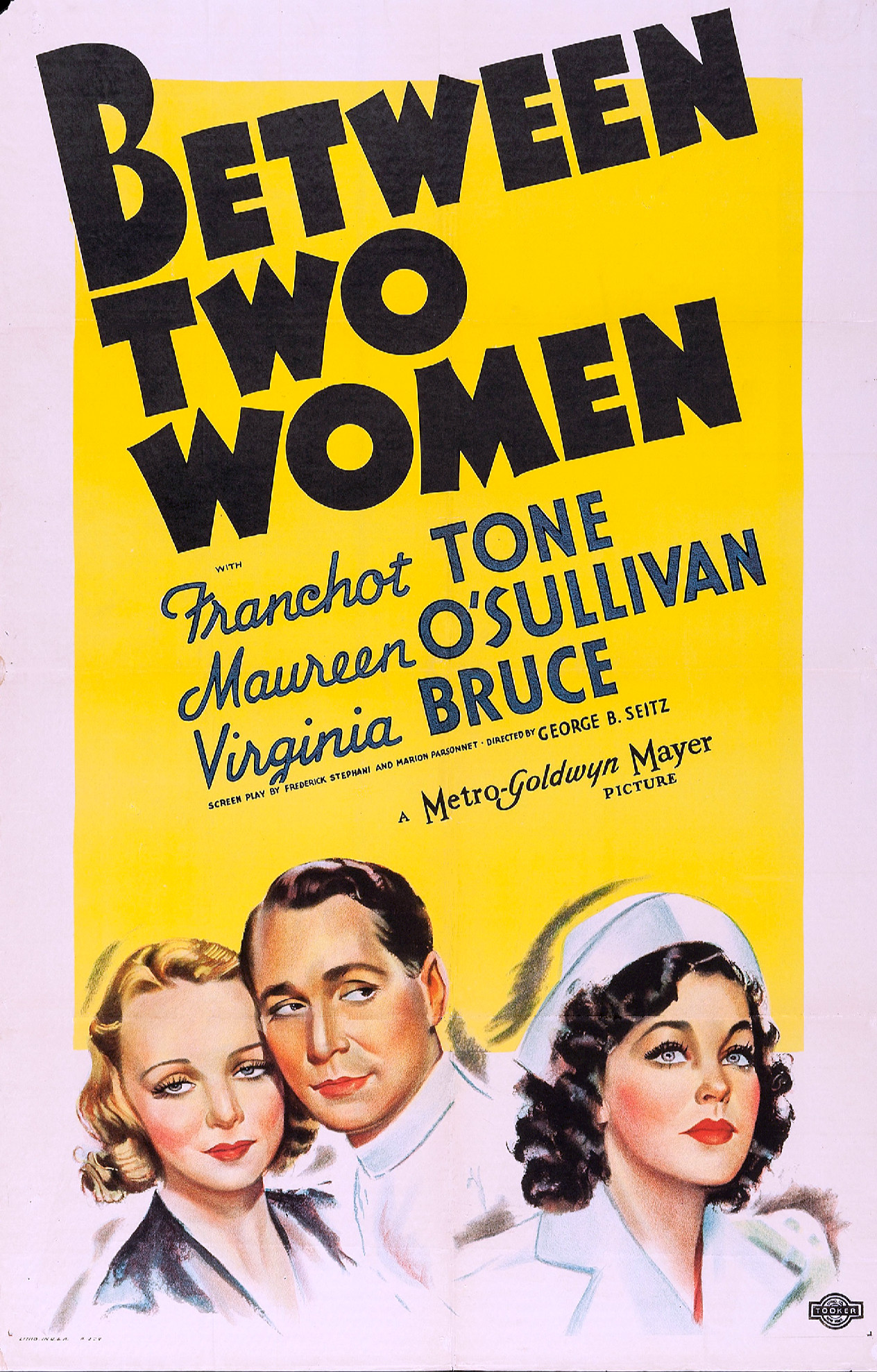
Top-billed with a lead role back at MGM studios on a 1937 film poster

He had the lead in Between Two Women (1937) and co-starred for the final time with Crawford in The Bride Wore Red (1937), then joined Myrna Loy in Man-Proof (1938) and Gladys George in Love Is a Headache (1938).

In Three Comrades (1938) Tone was teamed with Robert Taylor and Margaret Sullavan in a film about disillusioned soldiers returning to Germany after World War I. He made Three Loves Has Nancy (1938) with Janet Gaynor and Robert Montgomery and co-starred with Franciska Gaal in The Girl Downstairs (1938), a Cinderella type story. He then starred in a "B" picture with Ann Sothern in Fast and Furious (1939) as married crime sleuths, the third movie in a series with different sets of actors in each, that were marketed towards the Thin Man films audiences.

After his contract ended, Tone left MGM in 1939 to act on Broadway in a return to his stage roots, often working with "the Group's" members of its formative years, and playwrights such as Eugene O'Neill. He returned to Broadway for Irwin Shaw's The Gentle People (1939) and an adaptation of Ernest Hemingway's The Fifth Column (1940), which only had a short run.

=== 1940–1949: The Universal, Columbia & Paramount combination ===
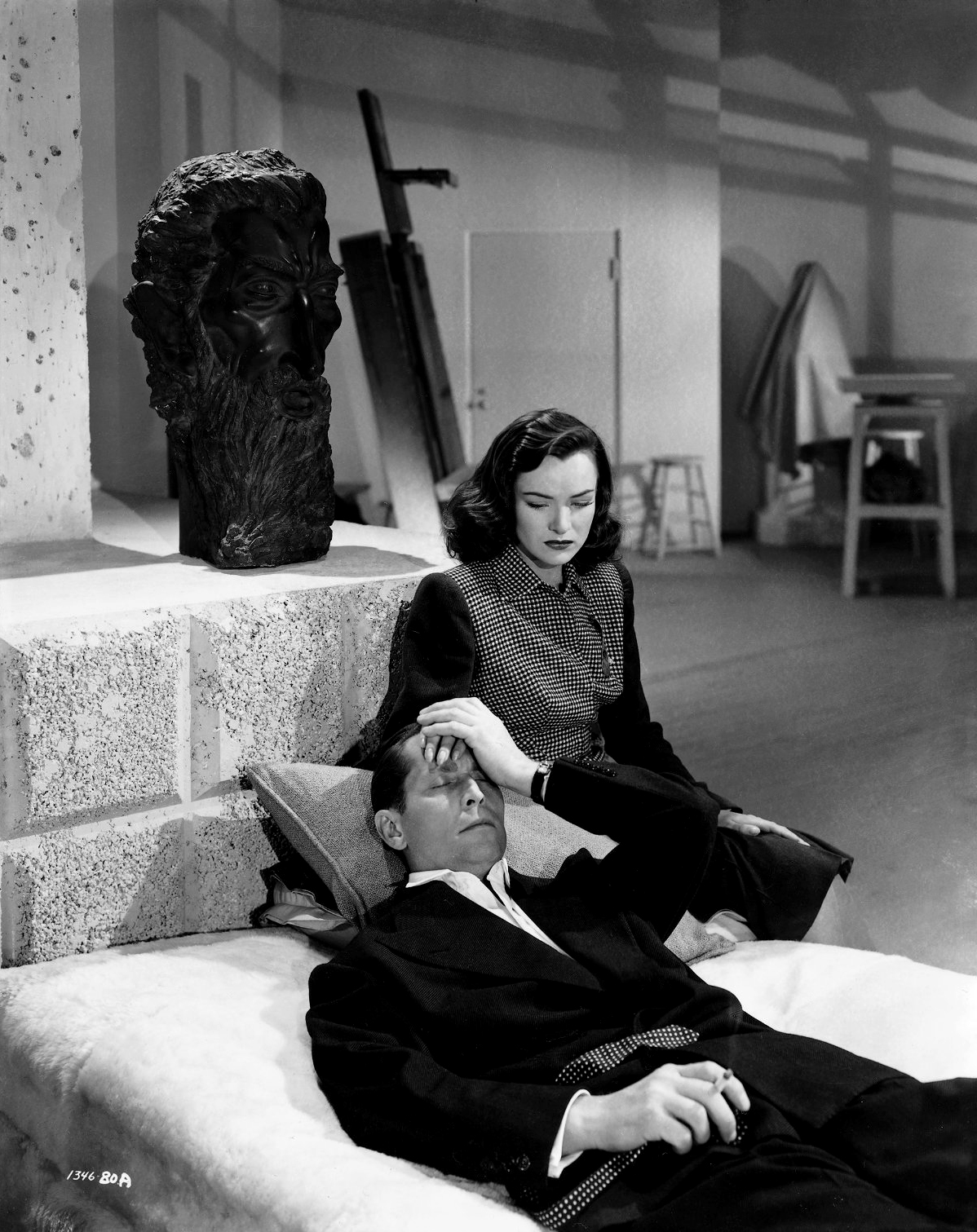
Tone and Ella Raines in Phantom Lady (1944), an early noir and villainous role for him

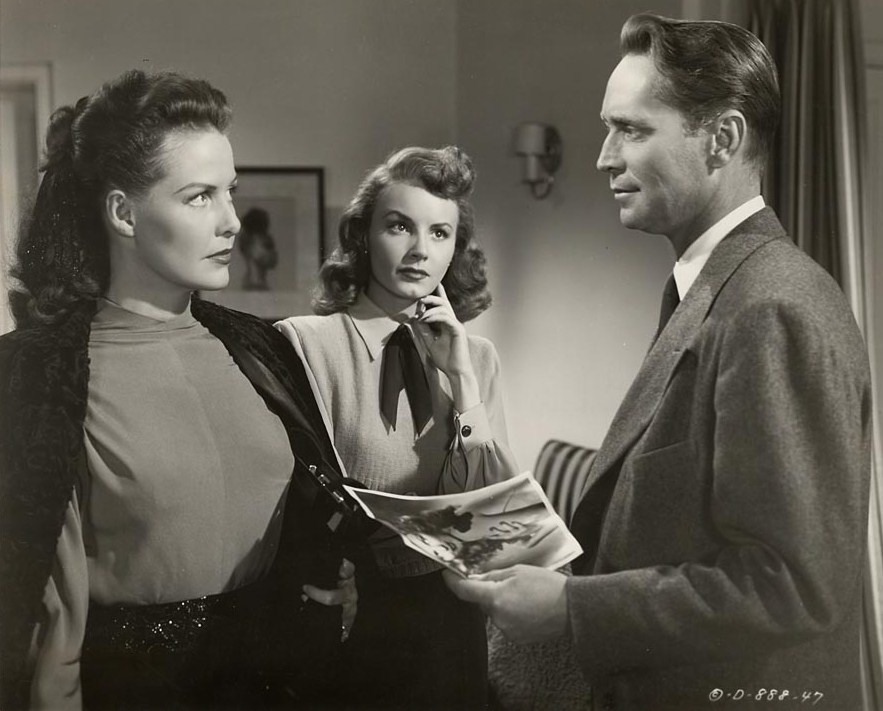
Janis Carter, Janet Blair and Tone in I Love Trouble (1948)

Tone signed a contract with Universal, starring in his first Western there, Trail of the Vigilantes (1940), where he more than earns his spurs alongside the likes of Broderick Crawford and Andy Devine. He was soon back supporting female stars though, making Nice Girl? (1941) with Deanna Durbin.

Tone also signed a multi-picture deal with Columbia, where he made two films with Joan Bennett, She Knew All the Answers (1941) and The Wife Takes a Flyer (1942).

Back at Universal he was top billed in This Woman Is Mine (1941). Tone went to Paramount to star in Five Graves to Cairo (1942), a World War II espionage story directed by Billy Wilder.

He also returned to MGM to star in Pilot No. 5 (1943) then it was back to Universal for His Butler's Sister (1943) with Durbin.

Tone made two more films at Paramount, True to Life (1943) with Mary Martin and The Hour Before the Dawn (1944) with Veronica Lake. He had one of his best roles in Universal's Phantom Lady (1944) directed by Robert Siodmak, an early film noir picture and a villainous part for Tone. Also impressive was his performance in Dark Waters (1944) with Merle Oberon for Benedict Bogeaus.

He continued his stage career by performing on Broadway in Hope for the Best (1945) with Jane Wyatt; the production ran for a little more than three months.

At Universal Tone did That Night with You (1945) with Susanna Foster and Because of Him (1946) with Durbin.

Tone made Lost Honeymoon (1947) at Eagle-Lion Studios and Honeymoon (1947) with Shirley Temple. While at Columbia he had roles in Her Husband's Affairs (1947) with Lucille Ball, and I Love Trouble (1947), then Every Girl Should Be Married (1948) reteamed with Grant at RKO. He had the lead as an assistant D.A. looking for the murderer of a journalist while being distracted by a beauty played by then wife Jean Wallace in the film noir thriller, Jigsaw (1949). He then had a supporting part as a murder victim in Without Honor (1949), a noir film co-starring Laraine Day.

=== 1949: Producer ===
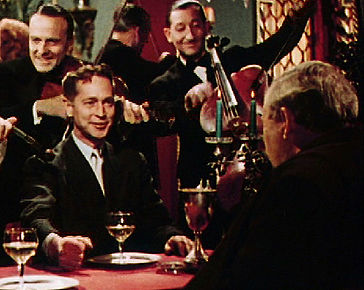
Tone and Laughton in The Man on the Eiffel Tower (1949)

Tone produced and starred in The Man on the Eiffel Tower (1949), a troubled production suffering from filming delays on location, creative wrangling and the picture's hard-to-transfer single-strip technicolor film stock. It has benefited from restorations in the 2000s that have coincided with theatrical showings and vastly improved DVD releases. Tone's tour de force role as a manic depressive sociopath included performing many of his own stunts on the Paris landmark.

Burgess Meredith and Charles Laughton star with Tone. Meredith is credited as director, although Tone took over duties when Meredith was in front of the camera with Laughton sometimes directing himself. The film has, according to French director Jean Renoir, some of the best cinematic pictures of the Eiffel Tower.

=== 1950–1959: Live theater television ===
Tone relocated to New York and began appearing in New York City-based live theater television, including The Philco-Goodyear Television Playhouse, Lux Video Theatre, Danger, Suspense and Starlight Theatre. He returned to Hollywood to appear in Here Comes the Groom (1951).

Back on the small screen, Tone was in Lights Out, Tales of Tomorrow, Hollywood Opening Night, The Revlon Mirror Theater, and The Philip Morris Playhouse. But he soon returned to Broadway, appearing in a big hit with Oh, Men! Oh, Women! (1953–54), which ran for 400 performances, a revival of The Time of Your Life (1955) and Eugene O'Neill's A Moon for the Misbegotten with Wendy Hiller and Cyril Cusack in 1957.

During this time he continued to appear on TV adaptations of Broadway plays, in such original productions as Twelve Angry Men, as well as The Elgin Hour, The Ford Television Theatre, and in The Best of Broadway series in a production of The Guardsman with Claudette Colbert. Tone then continued in Four Star Theatre, Robert Montgomery Presents, a Playwrights '56 production of The Sound and the Fury, Omnibus, General Electric Theater, The United States Steel Hour, The Kaiser Aluminum Hour, The Alcoa Hour, Climax!, Armchair Theatre, Pursuit, Westinghouse Desilu Playhouse, Alfred Hitchcock Presents, Goodyear Theatre, Playhouse 90, and DuPont Show of the Month.

He did a TV adaptation of The Little Foxes (1956) with Greer Garson and played Frank James in Bitter Heritage (1958). In 1957 Tone co-produced, co-directed, and starred in an adaptation of Chekhov's Uncle Vanya, which was filmed concurrently with an off-Broadway revival. His performance as the Russian country doctor with "ennui" was praised and the preserving of the stage production to film only varied by the addition of then-wife Dolores Dorn.

=== 1960–1968: Final films and television ===
In the early 1960s Tone was in episodes of Bonanza and The Twilight Zone ("The Silence") and appeared on Broadway in an adaptation of Mandingo (1961). He then played the spent, dying president in the screen adaptation of the Pulitzer Prize-winning novel Advise & Consent (1962), an Otto Preminger film that the director had unsuccessfully lobbied Martin Luther King to portray a senator in, while two U.S. senators played extras on Capitol Hill locations previously used for Mr. Smith Goes to Washington.

On stage in 1963 he acted in a revival of O'Neill's Strange Interlude, with Ben Gazzarra and Jane Fonda, and Bicycle Ride to Nevada. The next year he appeared in Lewis John Carlino's Double Talk.

He was cast in TV shows such as The Eleventh Hour, Dupont Show of the Week, The Reporter, Festival, The Alfred Hitchcock Hour, and The Virginian. He appeared in what is possibly the first TV movie, See How They Run (1964).

In Europe, Tone made La bonne soupe (1965). He co-starred in the Ben Casey medical series from 1965 to 1966 as Casey's supervisor, Dr. Daniel Niles Freeland.

He had roles in Otto Preminger's film In Harm's Way (1965) in which he portrayed Admiral Husband E. Kimmel and Arthur Penn's Mickey One (1965), and an episode of Run for Your Life. He appeared off-Broadway in Beyond Desire (1967) and his last roles were in Shadow Over Elveron (1968) and Nobody Runs Forever (1968), a British film originally titled The High Commissioner.

== Personal life ==
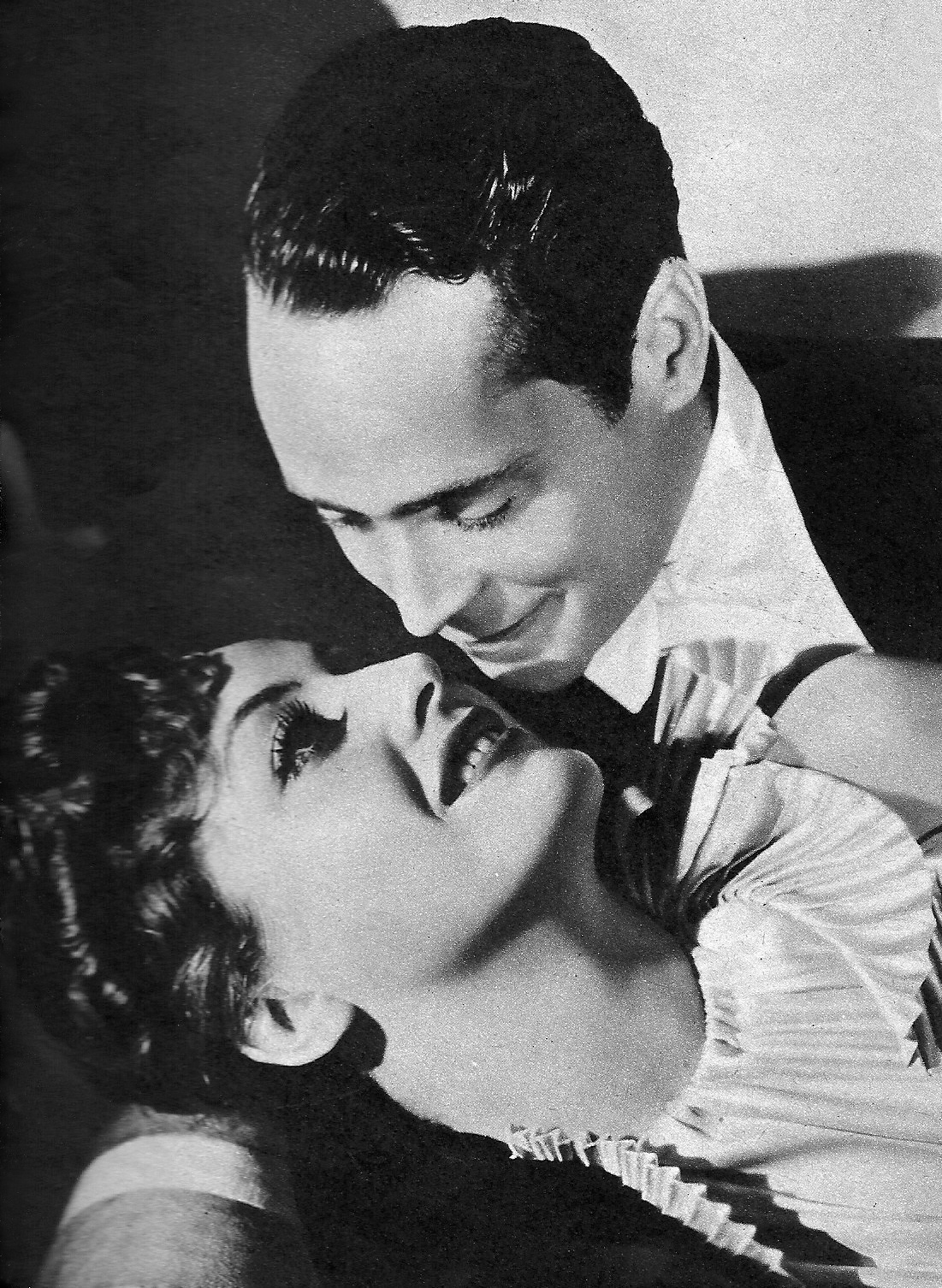
Tone and first wife Joan Crawford

In 1935, Tone married actress Joan Crawford; the couple divorced in 1939. They made seven films together – Today We Live (1933), Dancing Lady (1933), Sadie McKee (1934), No More Ladies (1935), The Gorgeous Hussy (1936), Love on the Run (1936), and The Bride Wore Red (1937). Their union produced no children; despite considerable effort, Crawford's pregnancies all ended in miscarriage.

Tone took their divorce hard, and his recollections of her were cynical — "She's like that old joke about Philadelphia: first prize, four years with Joan; second prize, eight". Many years later, however, when Tone was dying of lung cancer, Joan often cared for him, paying for medical treatments. Tone suggested they remarry, but she declined.

In 1941, Tone married fashion model-turned-actress Jean Wallace, who appeared with Tone in both Jigsaw and The Man on the Eiffel Tower. The couple had two sons and were divorced in 1948. She later married actor Cornel Wilde.

In 1951, Tone's relationship with actress Barbara Payton made headlines when he was rendered unconscious for 18 hours and sustained numerous facial injuries following a fistfight with actor Tom Neal, a rival for Payton's attention. Plastic surgery nearly fully restored his broken nose and cheek. Tone subsequently married Payton, but divorced her in 1952, after obtaining photographic evidence she had continued her relationship with Neal. Payton and Neal capitalized on the scandal, touring with a production of The Postman Always Rings Twice.

In 1956, Tone married Dolores Dorn, with whom he appeared in a film version of Uncle Vanya (1957) which Tone directed and produced. The couple divorced in 1959.

=== Death ===
Tone, a chain smoker, died of lung cancer in New York City on September 18, 1968. He was cremated and his ashes kept on a shelf in his son's library, surrounded by the works of Shakespeare, until July 24, 2022, when they were interred in the Point Comfort Cemetery of Quebec, Canada.

== Stage credits ==
Year	Title	Role	Venue
1927	The Belt	Bunner	New Playwrights Theatre, New York
1928	Centuries	Yankel	New Playwrights Theatre, New York
1928	The International	David Fitch	New Playwrights Theatre, New York
1929	The Age of Innocence	Newland Archer, Jr.	Empire Theatre, New York
1929	Uncle Vanya	Mikhail lvovich Astrov	Morosco Theatre, New York
1929	Cross Roads	Duke	Morosco Theatre, New York
1929–30	Red Rust	Fedor	Martin Beck Theatre, New York
1930	Hotel Universe	Tom Ames	Martin Beck Theatre, New York
1930–31	Pagan Lady	Ernest Todd	48th Street Theatre, New York
1931	Green Grow the Lilacs	Curly McClain	Guild Theatre, New York
1931	The House of Connelly	Will Connelly	Martin Beck Theatre, New York
1931	The House of Connelly	Will Connelly	Mansfield Theatre, New York
1931	1931		Mansfield Theatre, New York
1932	Night Over Taos	Federico	48th Street Theatre, New York
1932	A Thousand Summers	Neil Barton	Selwyn Theatre, New York
1932–33	Success Story	Raymond Merritt	Maxine Elliott's Theatre, New York
1939	The Gentle People	Harold Goff	Belasco Theatre, New York
1940	The Fifth Column	Philip Rawlings	Alvin Theatre, New York
1945	Hope for the Best	Michael Jordan	Fulton Theatre, New York
1945	Hope for the Best	Michael Jordan	Royale Theatre, New York
1952	The Second Man		Lakewood Park Theatre, Barnesville
1953–54	Oh, Men! Oh, Women!	Alan Coles	Henry Miller's Theatre, New York
1955	The Time of Your Life	Joe	New York City Center, New York
1956	Uncle Vanya	Mikhail lvovich Astrov	4th Street Theatre, New York
1957	A Moon for the Misbegotten	James Tyrone, Jr.	Bijou Theatre, New York
1959	Caesar and Cleopatra	Julius Caesar	Edgewater Beach Playhouse, Chicago
1961	Mandingo	Warren Maxwell	Lyceum Theatre, New York
1963	Strange Interlude	Professor Henry Leeds	Hudson Theatre, New York
1963	Strange Interlude	Professor Henry Leeds	Martin Beck Theatre, New York
1963	Bicycle Ride to Nevada	Winston Sawyer	Cort Theatre, New York
1964	Double Talk	Old Man	Theater de Lys, New York
1967	Beyond Desire	Karl Klingman	Theater for the New City, New York

== Filmography ==
=== Film ===
Year	Title	Role	Notes
1932	The Wiser Sex	Phil Long	
1933	Today We Live	Ronnie	
1933	Gabriel Over the White House	Hartley "Beek" Beekman	
1933	Midnight Mary	Thomas "Tom" Mannering, Jr.	
1933	The Stranger's Return	Guy Crane	
1933	Stage Mother	Warren Foster	
1933	Bombshell	Gifford Middleton	
1933	Dancing Lady	Tod Newton	
1934	Moulin Rouge	Douglas Hall	
1934	Sadie McKee	Michael Alderson	
1934	The World Moves On	Richard Girard	
1934	The Girl from Missouri	T.R. Paige, Jr.	
1934	Straight Is the Way	Benny	
1934	Gentlemen Are Born	Bob Bailey	
1935	The Lives of a Bengal Lancer	Lieutenant Forsythe	
1935	One New York Night	Foxhall Ridgeway	
1935	Reckless	Robert "Bob" Harrison, Jr.	
1935	No More Ladies	Jim "Jimsy Boysie" Salston	
1935	Mutiny on the Bounty	Midshipman Roger Byam	
1935	Dangerous	Don Bellows	
1936	Exclusive Story	Dick Barton	
1936	The Unguarded Hour	Sir Alan Dearden	
1936	The King Steps Out	Emperor Franz Josef	
1936	Suzy	Terry	
1936	The Gorgeous Hussy	John Eaton	
1936	Love on the Run	Barnabus W. "Barney" Pells	
1937	Quality Street	Dr. Valentine Brown	
1937	They Gave Him a Gun	James "Jimmy" Davis	
1937	Between Two Women	Allan Meighan	
1937	The Bride Wore Red	Giulio	
1938	Man-Proof	Jimmy Kilmartin	
1938	Love Is a Headache	Peter Lawrence	
1938	Three Comrades	Otto Koster	
1938	Three Loves Has Nancy	Robert "Bob" Hanson	
1938	The Girl Downstairs	Paul / Mr. Wagner	
1939	Fast and Furious	Joel Sloane	
1940	Trail of the Vigilantes	"Kansas" / Tim Mason	
1941	Nice Girl?	Richard Calvert	
1941	She Knew All the Answers	Mark Willows	
1941	This Woman is Mine	Robert Stevens	
1942	The Wife Takes a Flyer	Christopher Reynolds	
1942	Star Spangled Rhythm	John in Card-Playing Skit	
1943	Five Graves to Cairo	Corporal John J. Bramble / "Paul Davos"	
1943	Pilot No. 5	George Braynor Collins	
1943	His Butler's Sister	Charles Gerard	
1943	True to Life	Fletcher Marvin	
1944	Phantom Lady	Jack Marlow	
1944	The Hour Before the Dawn	Jim Hetherton	
1944	Dark Waters	Dr. George Grover	
1945	That Night with You	Paul Renaud	
1946	Because of Him	Paul Taylor	
1947	Lost Honeymoon	Johnny Gray	
1947	Honeymoon	David Flanner	
1947	Her Husband's Affairs	William "Bill" Weldon	
1948	I Love Trouble	Stuart Bailey	
1948	Every Girl Should Be Married	Roger Sanford	
1949	Jigsaw	Howard Malloy	Alternative title: Gun Moll
1949	Without Honor	Dennis Williams	Alternative title: Woman Accused
1950	The Man on the Eiffel Tower	Johann Radek	Also co-producer
1951	Here Comes the Groom	Wilbur Stanley	
1957	Uncle Vanya	Dr. Astroff	Also co-producer and co-director
1962	Advise & Consent	The president	
1964	La Bonne Soupe	John K. Montasi Jr.	
1965	In Harm's Way	Admiral Kimmel	
1965	Mickey One	Rudy Lapp	
1968	Nobody Runs Forever	Ambassador Townsend	

=== Television (partial) ===
Year	Title	Role	Notes
1952	Tales of Tomorrow		Episode: "The Horn"
1954	Studio One	Juror No. 3	Episode: "Twelve Angry Men"
1955	Four Star Playhouse	Ben Chaney	Episode: "Award"
1956	General Electric Theater	Charles Proteus Steinmetz	Episode: "Steinmetz"
1956	The Little Foxes	Horace	TV movie
1957	The Kaiser Aluminum Hour	Arthur Baldwin	Episode: "Throw Me a Rope"
1958	Westinghouse Desilu Playhouse	Candy Lombe	Episode: "The Crazy Hunter"
1958	Bitter Heritage	Frank James	TV movie
1959, 1964	Alfred Hitchcock Presents	Oliver Mathews, The Great Rudolph	Episodes: "The Impossible Dream" and "The Final Performance"
1960	Bonanza	Denver McKee	Episode: "Denver McKee"
1961	The Twilight Zone	Colonel Archie Taylor	Episode: "The Silence"
1961	Witchcraft	Your Host	TV movie
1965–66	Ben Casey	Dr. Daniel Niles Freeland	27 episodes
1964	See How They Run	Baron Frood	TV movie
1965	The Virginian	Murdock	Episode: "Old Cowboy"
1967	Run for Your Life	Judge Taliaferro Wilson	Episode: "Tell It Like It Is"
1968	Shadow Over Elveron	Barney Conners	TV movie

== Radio appearances ==
Year	Program	Episode	Ref.
1936	Lux Radio Theatre	"Chained"	
1937	Lux Radio Theatre	"Mary of Scotland"	
1943	Lux Radio Theatre	"Each Dawn I Die"	
1943	Lux Radio Theatre	"Five Graves to Cairo"	
1944	Lux Radio Theatre	"The Hard Way"	
1952	Theatre Guild on the Air	"The House of Mirth"	
1953	Broadway Playhouse	"His Brother's Keeper"	

== Awards and nominations ==
Ceremony	Date	Category	Work	Result	Ref.
8th Academy Awards	5 March 1936	Best Actor (Note: Tone's co-stars, Charles Laughton and Clark Gable, were also nominated in the same category.)	Mutiny on the Bounty	Nominated	
