= Fannie Heaslip Lea =

American author and poet

- Born: October 30, 1884; New Orleans, Louisiana
- Died: January 13, 1955 (aged 70); New York, New York
- Education: H. Sophie Newcomb Memorial College
- Occupations: Author and poet
- Spouse: Hamilton Pope Agee (m. 1911; div. 1926)
- Children: Anne Worthen Agee
- Writing career
- Notable work: "The Dead Faith"

Fannie Heaslip Lea (October 30, 1884 – January 13, 1955) was an American author and poet, best known for her poem "The Dead Faith".

== Biography ==
Fannie (sometimes spelled Fanny) Heaslip Lea, the daughter of newspaperman James J. Lea and Margaret Heaslip, was born in New Orleans, Louisiana. After attending public schools in New Orleans, she matriculated to H. Sophie Newcomb Memorial College in New Orleans, where she received a B.A. in 1904, and did graduate work in English at Tulane University in Louisiana for two years after.

Until her marriage in 1911, she wrote feature articles for New Orleans daily newspapers and short stories for magazines such as Harper's, a short story, "Little Anna and the Gentleman Adventurer", in the 1910 The Century Magazine and Woman's Home Companion. Afterwards, she moved with her husband, Hamilton Pope Agee, to Honolulu. Her first novel, Quicksands, was published in this year. She continued to write through the birth of a daughter, Anne Worthen. She divorced Agee in 1926 and moved to New York, publishing 19 novels and more than 100 stories, poems, and essays in various newspapers and journals, until her death in 1955.

Lea wrote several plays. Her first, Round-About, was produced in 1929 by the New York Theatre Assembly.

Her papers are housed in the University of Oregon Library in Eugene, Oregon.

== Bibliography ==
Lea's works include;

- Anchor Man (1935). Publisher: Dodd, Mead & Company, NY
- Chloe Malone (1916). Publisher: Boston, Little, Brown & Co.
- Crede Byron: A Play (1936). Publisher: Dodd, Mead & Company, NY
- Devil Within (1948). Publisher: Dodd, Mead & Company, NY
- Dorée (1934). Publisher: Dodd, Mead & Company, NY
- Good-bye, Summer (1931). Publisher: Dodd, Mead & Company, NY
- Half Angel (1932). Publisher: Dodd, Mead & Company, New York
- Happy Landings (1930). Publisher: Dodd, Mead & Company, NY
- Jaconetta Stories (1912). Publisher: Sturgis & Walton Company, NY
- Little Anna and the Gentleman Adventurer (1910). Published in periodical form across prominent magazines including The Century Magazine and Woman's Home Companion.
- Men and Angel (1935). Published in periodical form in Good Housekeeping, July 1934.
- Nobody's Girl (1940). Publisher: Dodd, Mead & Company, NY
- Not for Just an Hour (1939). Publisher: Triangle Books, NY
- Once to Every Man (1938). Publisher: Dodd, Mead & Company, NY
- Quicksands (1911). Clinton Balmer (Illustrator). Lea's first novel. Publisher: Sturgis & Walton Company, NY
- Sailor's Star (1944). Publisher: Dodd, Mead & Company, NY
- Sicily Ann: A Romance (1914). Publisher: Harper & Bros, NY
- Summer People (1933). Publisher: Dodd, Mead & Company, NY
- Take Back the Heart (1931). Publisher: Dodd, Mead & Company, NY
- The Danger Zone (1911). Publisher: Andrew Melrose, London
- The Dead Faith (1908). Poem.
- The Dream-maker Man (1925). Publisher: Dodd, Mead & Company, NY
- The Four Marys (1936). Publisher: Dodd, Mead & Company, NY
- The Peacock Screen (1912).
- The Runners (1910). Poem read at the inaugural exercises of the Phi Beta Kappa Society at Tulane University. Publication: The Phi Beta Kappa Key, vol.1, no.1, Nov. 1910, p. 5
- There are Brothers (1940). Publisher: Dodd, Mead & Company, NY
- Verses for Lovers, and Some Others (1955). Publisher: Dodd, Mead & Company, NY
- Wild-goose Chase (1929). Publisher: Dodd, Mead & Company, NY
- With or Without (1926). Publisher: Dodd, Mead & Company, NY
- With This Ring (1925). Publisher: Dodd, Mead & Company, NY

== Sources ==
- Ewell, Barbara C. (2000). "Lea, Fannie Heaslip". Novelguide.com. Archived from the original on July 23, 2011.
