= Robert Siodmak =

German film director (1900–1973)

- Born: 8 August 1900; Dresden, Saxony, German Empire (now Germany)
- Died: 10 March 1973 (aged 72); Ascona, Ticino, Switzerland
- Occupations: Film director, screenwriter, producer
- Years active: 1927–1969
- Spouse: Bertha Odenheimer (1933–1973; her death)
- Family: Curt Siodmak (brother)

Robert Siodmak (/siˈɒd.mæk/; 8 August 1900 – 10 March 1973) was a German film director, screenwriter, and producer. His career spanned some 40 years, working extensively in the United States and France, as well as in his native country.

Though he worked in many genres, he was best known as a skilled craftsman of thrillers and film noir, and was nominated for an Academy Award for Best Director for The Killers (1946). Later in his career, he won the Golden Bear for Die Ratten (1955) and the German Film Award for Best Director for The Devil Strikes at Night (1957).

His brother was writer and filmmaker Curt Siodmak.

== Early life ==
Siodmak was born in Dresden, Germany, one of three children of Rosa Philippine (née Blum) and Ignatz Siodmak. His parents were both from Jewish families in Leipzig (the myth of his American birth in Memphis, Tennessee was necessary for him to obtain a visa in Paris during World War II). He worked as a stage director and a banker before becoming editor and scenarist for Curtis Bernhardt in 1925 (Bernhardt directed a film of Siodmak's story Conflict in 1945).

== Career ==
=== Pre-war Germany ===
At twenty-six he was hired by his cousin, producer Seymour Nebenzal, to assemble original silent movies from stock footage of old films. Siodmak worked at this for two years before he persuaded Nebenzal to finance his first feature, the silent masterpiece, Menschen am Sonntag (People on Sunday) in 1929. The script was co-written by Billy Wilder and Siodmak's brother Curt, later the screenwriter of The Wolf Man (1941). It was the last German silent and also included such future Hollywood artists as Fred Zinnemann, Edgar G. Ulmer, and Eugen Schufftan. His next film—the first at UFA to use sound—was the 1930 comedy Abschied for writers Emeric Pressburger and Irma von Cube, followed by Der Mann, der seinen Mörder sucht, another comedy, yet quite different and unusual, a likely product of Billy Wilder's imagination. But in his next film, the crime thriller Stürme der Leidenschaft, with Emil Jannings and Anna Sten, Siodmak found a style that would become his own.

=== France ===
With the rise of Nazism and following an attack in the press by Hitler's minister of propaganda Joseph Goebbels in 1933 after viewing Brennendes Geheimnis (The Burning Secret), Siodmak left Germany for Paris. His creativity flourished, as he worked for the next six years in a variety of film genres, from comedy (Le sexe faible and La Vie Parisienne) to musical (La crise est finie, with Danielle Darrieux) to drama (Mister Flow, Cargaison blanche, Mollenard—compare Gabrielle Dorziat's shrewish wife with that of Rosalind Ivan in The Suspect—and Pièges, with Maurice Chevalier and Erich von Stroheim). While in France, he was well on his way to becoming successor to Rene Clair, until Hitler again forced him out. Siodmak arrived in California in 1939, where he made 23 movies, many of them widely popular thrillers and crime melodramas, which critics today regard as classics of film noir.

=== Hollywood ===
Beginning in 1941, he first turned out several B-films and programmers for various studios before he gained a seven-year contract with Universal Studios in 1943. The best of those early films are the thriller Fly by Night in 1942, with Richard Carlson and Nancy Kelly, and in 1943 Someone to Remember, with Mabel Paige in a signature role. As house director, his services were often used to salvage troublesome productions at the studio. On Mark Hellinger's production Swell Guy (1946), for instance, Siodmak was brought in to replace Frank Tuttle only six days after completing work on The Killers. Siodmak worked steadily while under contract, overshadowed by high-profile directors, like Alfred Hitchcock, with whom he had been often compared by the press.

At Universal, Siodmak made yet another B-film, Son of Dracula (1943), the third in the studio's series of Dracula movies (based on his brother Curt's original story). His second feature was the Maria Montez/Jon Hall vehicle, Cobra Woman (1944), made in Technicolor.

His first all-out noir was Phantom Lady (1944), for staff producer Joan Harrison, Universal's first female executive and Alfred Hitchcock's former secretary and script assistant. It showcased Siodmak's skill with camera and editing to dazzling effect, but no more so than in the iconic jam-session sequence with Elisha Cook Jr. in throes on the drums. Following the critical success of Phantom Lady, Siodmak directed Christmas Holiday (1944) with Deanna Durbin and Gene Kelly (Hans J. Salter received an Oscar nomination for best music). Beginning with this film, his work in Hollywood attained the stylistic and thematic characteristics that are evident in his later noirs. Christmas Holiday, adapted from a W. Somerset Maugham novel of the same title by Herman J. Mankiewicz, was Durbin's most successful feature. Siodmak's use of black-and-white cinematography and urban landscapes, together with his light-and-shadow designs, followed the basic structure of classic noir films. In fact, he had a number of collaborations with cinematographers, such as Nicholas Musuraca, Elwood Bredell, and Franz Planer, in which he achieved the Expressionist look he had cultivated in his early years at UFA. During Siodmak's tenure, Universal made the most of the noir style in The Suspect, The Strange Affair of Uncle Harry and The Dark Mirror, but the capstone was The Killers. Released in 1946, it was Burt Lancaster's film debut and Ava Gardner's first dramatic, featured role. A critical and financial success, it earned Siodmak his only Oscar nomination for direction in Hollywood. His German production Nachts, wenn der Teufel kam, based on the false story of Bruno Lüdke, who was falsely accused of being a serial killer by the Nazis, was nominated for Best Foreign Language Film in 1957.

While still under contract at Universal, Siodmak worked on loan out to RKO for producer Dore Schary in the thriller The Spiral Staircase, a masterly blending of suspense and horror, which Siodmak said he edited as he pleased, due to a strike in Hollywood in 1945. The film earned Ethel Barrymore an Oscar nomination for Best Supporting Actress. For 20th Century Fox and producer Darryl F. Zanuck, he directed, partly on location in New York City, the crime noir Cry of the City in 1948, and in 1949 for MGM he tackled its lux production The Great Sinner, but the prolix script proved unmanageable for Siodmak who relinquished direction to the dependable Mervyn LeRoy. On loan out to Paramount in 1949, he made for producer Hal B. Wallis his penultimate American noir The File on Thelma Jordon, with Barbara Stanwyck at her most fatal—and sympathetic. Siodmak saw in this film a thematic link with The Suspect and The Strange Affair of Uncle Harry, with the failed lovers of these films and significantly their tragic conclusions (ten years later he addressed the same theme in The Rough and the Smooth). Perhaps his finest American noir—although not his last—is Criss Cross that was to reunite him not only with Lancaster, but also The Killers producer Mark Hellinger, who died suddenly before production began in 1949. Working without the hands-on control of Hellinger again, Siodmak was able to make this film his own as he could not the earlier film. Yvonne De Carlo's working-class femme fatal (a high mark in her career) completes the deadly triangle, along with Lancaster and Dan Duryea: the archetype of doomed attraction central to all Siodmak's noirs, but the one he could fully express to its nihilistic conclusion.

Siodmak immersed himself in the creative process and enjoyed working with actors, acquiring a reputation as an actor's director for his work with many future stars, including Burt Lancaster, Ernest Borgnine, Tony Curtis, Debra Paget, Maria Schell, Mario Adorf, Ava Gardner, Olivia de Havilland, Dorothy McGuire, Yvonne de Carlo, Barbara Stanwyck, Geraldine Fitzgerald, and Ella Raines.

He directed his close friend Charles Laughton and George Sanders, and got from both the most natural performances of their careers. From Lon Chaney Jr. he drew a performance for Son of Dracula. He managed with Lancaster to capture a youthful vulnerability in The Killers, despite the actor being 33 at the time. He was also able to get a dramatic performance from Gene Kelly, and helped raise Ava Gardner's public profile.

=== Return to Europe ===
Before leaving for Europe in 1952, following the problematic production The Crimson Pirate for Norma Productions (distributed through Warner Bros.) and producer Harold Hecht, his third and last film with Burt Lancaster (Siodmak dubbed the chaotic experience "The Hecht Follies"), Siodmak had directed some of the era's best films noirs (twelve in all), more than any other director who worked in that style. However, his identification with film noir, generally unpopular with American audiences, may have been more of a curse than a blessing.

He often expressed his desire to make pictures "of a different type and background" than the ones he had been making for ten years. Nevertheless, he ended his Universal contract with one last noir, the disappointing Deported (1951) which he filmed partly abroad (Siodmak was among the first refugee directors to return to Europe after making American films). The story is loosely based on the deportation of gangster Charles "Lucky" Luciano. Siodmak had hoped Loretta Young would star, but settled for the Swedish actress Märta Torén.

Those "different type" of films he had made—The Great Sinner (1949) for MGM, Time Out of Mind (1947) for Universal (which Siodmak also produced), The Whistle at Eaton Falls (1951) for Columbia Pictures (Ernest Borgnine's debut and Dorothy Gish's return to the screen)—all proved ill-suited to his noir sensibilities (although in 1952 The Crimson Pirate, despite the difficult production, was a surprising and pleasing departure—in fact, Lancaster believed it was inspiration for the tongue-in-cheek style of the James Bond films).

The five months he collaborated with Budd Schulberg on a screenplay tentatively titled A Stone in the River Hudson, an early version of On the Waterfront, was also a major disappointment for Siodmak. In 1954 he sued producer Sam Spiegel for copyright infringement. Siodmak was awarded $100,000, but no screen credit. His contribution to the original screenplay has never been acknowledged.

Siodmak's return to Europe in 1954 with a Grand Prize nomination at the Cannes Film Festival for his remake of Jacques Feyder's Le grand jeu was a misstep, despite its stars, Gina Lollobrigida and Arletty in the role originated by Françoise Rosay, Feyder's wife. In 1955, Siodmak returned to the Federal Republic of Germany to make Die Ratten, with Maria Schell and Curd Jurgens, winning the Golden Berlin Bear at the 1955 Berlin Film Festival. It was the first in a series of films critical of his homeland, during and after Hitler, which included Nachts, wenn der Teufel kam, both thriller and social artifact of Germany under Nazi rule, shot in documentary style reminiscent of Menschen am Sonntag and Whistle at Eaton Falls, and in 1960, Mein Schulfreund, an absurdist comedy, dark and strange, with Heinz Rühmann as a postal worker attempting to reunite with childhood friend Hermann Göring. In April 1958, Siodmak was made an executive in Kirk Douglas' film production company Bryna Productions, as European Representative.

Between these films, and Mein Vater, der Schauspieler in 1956, with O. W. Fischer (the West German Rock Hudson), he took a detour into Douglas Sirk territory with the sordid melodrama, Dorothea Angermann in 1959, featuring Germany's star Ruth Leuwerik. Later the same year he left Germany for Great Britain to film The Rough and the Smooth, with Nadja Tiller and Tony Britton, yet another noir, but much meaner and gloomier than anything he had made in America (compare its downbeat ending with that of The File on Thelma Jordan). He followed with Katia also in 1959, a tale of Czarist Russia, with twenty-one-year-old Romy Schneider, mistakenly titled in America Magnificent Sinner, recalling—unfavorably—Siodmak's other costume melodrama. In 1961, L'affaire Nina B, with Pierre Brasseur and Nadja Tiller (again), returned Siodmak to familiar ground in a slick, black-and-white thriller about a pay-for-hire Nazi hunter, which could be argued was the start of the many spy themed films so popular in the 1960s. In 1962, the entertaining Escape from East Berlin, with Don Murray and Christine Kaufman, had all the characteristic style of a Siodmak thriller, but was one that he later dismissed as something he had made for "little kids in America." His work in Germany returned to programmers like those that had begun his career in Hollywood 23 years earlier. From 1964 to 1965, he made a series of films with former Tarzan Lex Barker: The Shoot, The Treasure of the Aztecs, and The Pyramid of the Sun God, all taken from the western, adventure novels of Karl May.

=== Later career ===
Siodmak's return to Hollywood filmmaking in 1967 with the wide-screen western Custer of the West was another disappointment, receiving mostly negative reviews from critics and failing to generate box-office appeal. Siodmak ended his career with a six-hour, two-part toga and chariot epic, The Last Roman (1968), a more campy work (perhaps intentionally) than Cobra Woman had been. There was a brief and profitable foray into television in Great Britain with the series O.S.S. (1957–58).

== Personal life ==
Siodmak long resided in Ascona, Ticino, Switzerland. He was married to Bertha Odenheimer from 1933 until her death in 1973.

=== Death ===
He died of a heart attack on 10 March 1973, seven weeks after his wife's death.

The British Film Institute held a retrospective of his career in April and May 2015.

== Filmography ==
- People on Sunday (German silent film, 1930)
- Der Kampf mit dem Drachen oder: Die Tragödie des Untermieters (1930, short)
- Farewell (German-language, 1930)
- The Man in Search of His Murderer (German-language, 1931)
- Inquest (German-language, 1931)
  - About an Inquest (French-language, 1931)
- Storms of Passion (German-language, 1932)
  - Tumultes (French-language, 1932)
- Quick (German-language, 1932)
  - Quick (French-language, 1932)
- The Burning Secret (German-language, 1933)
- The Weaker Sex (French-language, 1933)
- The Crisis is Over (French-language, 1934)
- La Vie parisienne (French-language, 1936)
  - Parisian Life (English-language, 1936)
- The Great Refrain (co-director: Yves Mirande, 1936)
- Compliments of Mister Flow (1936)
- White Cargo (1937)
- Mollenard (1938)
- Ultimatum (1938, co-directed with Robert Wiene, uncredited)
- The Corsican Brothers (1939, supervising director)
- Personal Column (1939)
- West Point Widow (1941)
- Fly-by-Night (1942)
- My Heart Belongs to Daddy (1942)
- The Night Before the Divorce (1942)
- Someone to Remember (1943)
- Son of Dracula (1943)
- Phantom Lady (1944)
- Cobra Woman (1944)
- Christmas Holiday (1944)
- The Suspect (1944)
- The Strange Affair of Uncle Harry (1945)
- The Spiral Staircase (1945)
- The Killers (1946)
- The Dark Mirror (1946)
- Time Out of Mind (1947)
- Cry of the City (1948)
- Criss Cross (1949)
- The Great Sinner (1949)
- The File on Thelma Jordon (1949)
- Deported (1950)
- The Whistle at Eaton Falls (1951)
- The Crimson Pirate (1952)
- Flesh and the Woman (1954)
- Die Ratten (1955)
- My Father, the Actor (1956)
- The Devil Strikes at Night (1957)
- O.S.S. (1957–1958, TV series, 4 episodes)
- Dorothea Angermann (1959)
- The Rough and the Smooth (1959)
- Magnificent Sinner (1959)
- My Schoolfriend (1960)
- The Nina B. Affair (1961)
- Escape from East Berlin (1962)
- The Shoot (1964)
- The Treasure of the Aztecs (1965)
- The Pyramid of the Sun God (1965)
- Custer of the West (1967)
- The Last Roman I (1968)
- The Last Roman II (1969)
