= My Heart Belongs to Daddy (disambiguation) =

"My Heart Belongs to Daddy" is a song by Cole Porter, and it may also refer to:

- "My Heart Belongs to Daddy" (Desperate Housewives), an episode of the TV series
- My Heart Belongs to Daddy (film), a 1942 film starring Frances Gifford
