= Richard Carlson =

Richard Carlson may refer to:

- Richard Carlson (actor) (1912–1977), American film and television actor
- Richard Carlson (author) (1961–2006), American author, psychotherapist, and motivational speaker
- Richard Carlson (politician), American politician serving in the Kansas House of Representatives
- Dick Carlson (Richard Warner Carlson, 1941–2025), American journalist
