= Kansas Department of Transportation =

US state government agency

Agency overview
- Headquarters: Eisenhower St. Office Bldg. 700 SW Harrison St, Topeka, Kansas 66603
- Employees: 2,515 (FY17)
- Annual budget: $1.6 billion (FY12)
- Agency executives: Calvin Reed, Secretary of Transportation; Burt Morey, State Transportation Engineer
- Website: www.ksdot.org

The Kansas Department of Transportation (KSDOT) is a state government organization in charge of maintaining public roadways of the U.S. state of Kansas.

== Funding issues ==
Since 2012, over $2 billion has been diverted from its coffers to the Kansas general fund and state agencies, earning it the nickname "the bank of KDOT", and jeopardizing the agency's ability to maintain roads in the state.

== Organization ==
KDOT's previous logo

- Secretary of Transportation
  - Deputy Secretary of Transportation
  - State Transportation Engineer
    - Planning and Development Division
    - Aviation Division
    - Engineering and Design Division
    - Operations Division
      - District 1 – Topeka
      - District 2 – Salina
      - District 3 – Norton
      - District 4 – Chanute
      - District 5 – Hutchinson
      - District 6 – Garden City
  - Deputy Secretary of Transportation for Finance and Administration
    - Finance Division
    - Administration Division
  - Special Assistant to the Secretary and Director of Public Affairs
  - Chief Counsel
  - Inspector General

== List of secretaries ==
- Deb Miller: January 13, 2003 – December 16, 2011
- Barb Rankin (acting): December 2011 - April 2012
- Mike King: April 2, 2012 – July 15, 2016
- Richard Carlson: July 18, 2016 – January 13, 2019
- Julie Lorenz: January 2019 – December 23, 2022
- Calvin Reed: December 2022 – present
