= I Led 3 Lives =

American drama series (1953–1956)

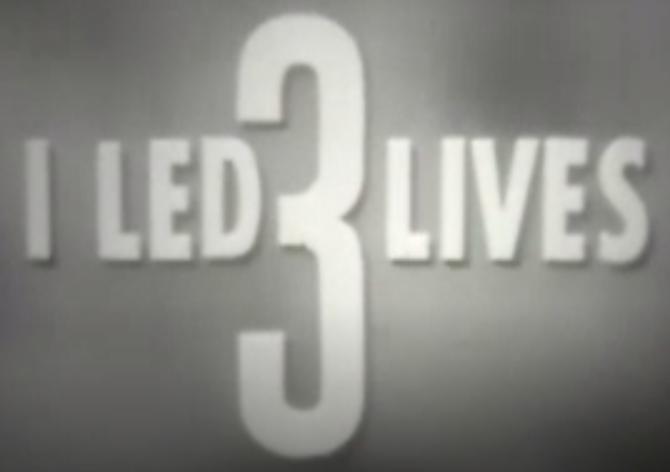
- Opening title screen
- Also known as: I Led Three Lives
- Genre: Drama
- Written by: Lee Berg; Frank Burt; Stuart Jerome; Norman Jolley; Gene Roddenberry
- Directed by: Eddie Davis; Leslie Goodwins; Jack Herzberg; Henry S. Kesler; Herbert L. Strock
- Starring: Richard Carlson
- Narrated by: Richard Carlson
- Country of origin: United States
- Original language: English
- No. of seasons: 3
- No. of episodes: 117

Production
- Executive producer: Frederick W. Ziv
- Producers: Leon Benson; Julius J. Epstein; Jack Herzberg; Henry S. Kesler; Lew Landers; Herbert L. Strock; Maurice Unger
- Cinematography: Monroe P. Askins; Curt Fetters; Robert Hoffman
- Editors: Ace Clark; Charles Craft; John B. Woelz
- Camera setup: Single-camera
- Running time: 30 minutes
- Production company: Ziv Television Programs

Original release
- Network: Syndication
- Release: October 1, 1953 – January 1, 1956

I Led 3 Lives (also known as I Led Three Lives) is an American drama series syndicated by Ziv Television Programs from October 1, 1953, to January 1, 1956. The series stars Richard Carlson. The show was a companion piece of sorts to the radio drama I Was a Communist for the FBI, which dealt with a similar subject and was also syndicated by Ziv from 1952 to 1954.

== Synopsis ==
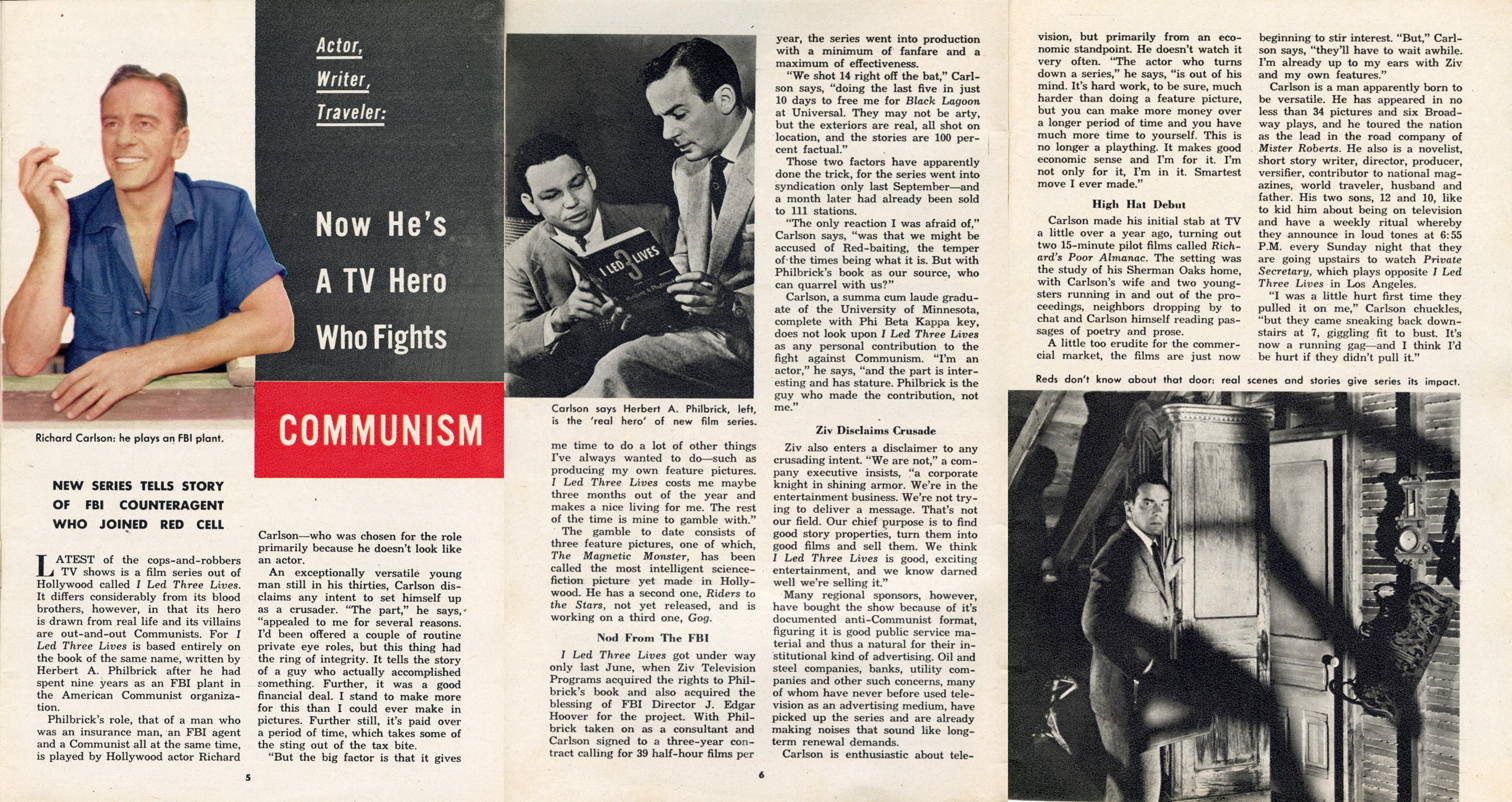
Richard Carlson and Herbert Philbrick in TV Guide, December 4, 1953

The series was loosely based on the life of Herbert Philbrick, a Boston advertising executive who infiltrated the U.S. Communist Party on behalf of the FBI in the 1940s and wrote a bestselling book on the topic, I Led Three Lives: Citizen, 'Communist', Counterspy (1952). The part of Philbrick was played by Richard Carlson. The "three lives" in the title are Philbrick's outward life as a white-collar worker, his secret life as a Communist agent, and his even more secret life as an FBI operative helping to foil Communist plots. I Led 3 Lives lasted 117 episodes. Philbrick served as a technical consultant, with Carlson narrating each episode.

The episodes often had very little to do with the actual events of Philbrick's life as related in his book; Philbrick is credited with only 5 of the 117 screenplays. Screenplays gradually became more and more outlandish, featuring, for example, such supposed "Communist plots" as the conversion of household vacuum cleaners (1942–1954 Electrolux) into tactical missile launchers with which the Communists intended to destroy America's Nike anti-aircraft defensive missiles, and the manufacturing of untraceable "ghost guns" (unserialized Colt M1911 .45 cal semi-automatics) with which the Communists intended to assassinate their political enemies.

The FBI reviewed all of the series' scripts. The series was honored by the Freedoms Foundation as the best television program of 1955.

== Main cast ==
- Richard Carlson – Herbert A. Philbrick
- Virginia Stefan – Eva Philbrick
- Patricia Morrow – Constance Philbrick
- Charles Maxwell – Special Agent Joe Carey
- William Hudson – Special Agent Mike Andrews
- John Beradino – Special Agent Steve Daniels
- John Zaremba – Special Agent Jerry Dressler
- Ed Hinton – Special Agent Henderson

=== Guest stars ===
- Vivi Janiss as Comrade Elaine in "Gun Running" and Comrade Endora in "Counterfeit"
- Eve McVeagh as Miss Cutler in "Commie Dies"
- Ewing Mitchell as Mr. Collins in "Defense Plant Security"
- Victor Rodman as Comrade Arthur in "Commie Dies"

== Episodes ==
=== Season 1 (1953–54) ===
No. overall	No. in season	Title	Directed by	Written by	Original release date
1	1	"Secret Call: Part 1"	Eddie Davis	Donn Mullally	October 4, 1953
2	2	"Bess: Part 2"	Eddie Davis	Unknown	October 11, 1953
3	3	"Dope Photographic"	Eddie Davis	Donn Mullally	October 18, 1953
4	4	"Baited Trap"	Lew Landers	Frank Burt	October 25, 1953
5	5	"Railroad Strike Attempt"	Eddie Davis	Gene Levitt	November 1, 1953
6	6	"Campus Story"	Lew Landers	Robert Yale Libott	November 8, 1953
7	7	"Army Infiltration"	Leslie Goodwins	Frank Burt	November 15, 1953
8	8	"The Spy"	Eddie Davis	Donn Mullally	November 22, 1953
9	9	"Jet Engine"	Lew Landers	Stuart Jerome	1953
10	10	"Helping Hand"	Eddie Davis	Gene Levitt	1953
11	11	"Parcels for Poland"	Leslie Goodwins	Frank Burt	1953
12	12	"Captured Congressman"	Eddie Davis	Don Brinkley & Stuart Jerome	1953
13	13	"Purloined Printing Press"	Eddie Davis	Donn Mullally	1953
14	14	"The Wife"	Eddie Davis	Donn Mullally	1954
15	15	"Civil Defense"	Leslie Goodwins	Gene Levitt	1954
16	16	"Communist Cop"	Eugene Forde	Frank Burt	1954
17	17	"Defense Plant Security"	Eddie Davis	Frank Burt	1954
18	18	"Gun Running"	Leslie Goodwins	Gene Levitt	1954
19	19	"Passports"	Herbert Strock	Gene Levitt	1954
20	20	"Map of the City"	Lambert Hillyer	Jack Rock	1954
21	21	"Caviar"	Lambert Hillyer	Gene Levitt	1954
22	22	"The Kid"	Herbert Strock	Arthur Fitz-Richard	1954
23	23	"Youth Movement"	Lambert Hillyer	Donn Mullally	1954
24	24	"Infra Red Film"	Eddie Davis	Stuart Jerome and Curt Siodmak	1954
25	25	"The Editor"	Lewis Allen	Stuart Jerome	1954
26	26	"Confused Comrade"	Leigh Jason	Jack Rock	1954
27	27	"Communication Disruptions"	Herbert Strock	Maurice Stoller	1954
28	28	"Phantom Labor Leader"	Henry S. Kesler	Robert Libott	1954
29	29	"Progressive"	Leigh Jason	Gene Levitt	1954
30	30	"Old Man"	Herbert Strock	Arthur Fitz-Richard	1954
31	31	"Birthday"	Tim Whelan	Jack Rock	1954
32	32	"Cell Leader"	Herbert Strock	Stuart Jerome	1954
33	33	"Dry Run"	Henry S. Kesler	Arthur E. Orloff	1954
34	34	"Comrade Wants Out"	Herbert Strock	Bob Mitchell	1954
35	35	"Depression"	Lambert Hillyer	Jack Rock	1954
36	36	"The Boss"	Eddie Davis	Stuart Jerome	1954
37	37	"Love Story"	Leon Benson	Arthur Fitz-Richard	1954
38	38	"Unexpected Trip"	Tim Whelan	Tim Whelan	1954
39	39	"Strategic Material"	Herbert Strock	Jack Rock	1954

=== Season 2 (1954–55) ===
No. overall	No. in season	Title	Directed by	Written by	Original release date
40	1	"Counterfeit"	Lew Landers	Jack Rock	1954
41	2	"Martyr"	Eddie Davis	Donn Mullally	1954
42	3	"Close Factory"	Leigh Jason	Stuart Jerome	1954
43	4	"Relatives"	Eddie Davis	Ellis Marcus	1954
44	5	"Homing Station"	Leon Benson	Arthur Fitz-Richard	1954
45	6	"Infiltration"	Lew Landers	Jack Rock	1954
46	7	"Assassination Plot"	Eddie Davis	Stuart Jerome	1954
47	8	"The Bomb"	Eddie Davis	Frederick Stephani	1954
48	9	"Atomic"	Herbert Strock	Leonard Heideman	1954
49	10	"Day Camp"	Leon Benson	Robert Libott	1954
50	11	"The Guest"	Henry S. Kesler	Arthur Fitz-Richard	1954
51	12	"Narcotics"	Henry S. Kesler	Stuart Jerome	1954
52	13	"Fifth Amendment"	Herbert Strock	Donn Mullally	1954
53	14	"Rest Home"	Eddie Davis	Jack Rock	1954
54	15	"Deportation"	Leon Benson	Robert Libott	1954
55	16	"The Switch"	Henry S. Kesler	Rik Vollaerts	1954
56	17	"Servicemen"	Leon Benson	Leonard Heideman	1954
57	18	"Asylum"	Herbert Strock	Richard G. Taylor	1954
58	19	"Moving"	Leon Benson and Herbert Strock	Arthur Fitz-Richard and Stuart Jerome	1954
59	20	"Minority Control"	Herbert Strock	Jack Rock	1954
60	21	"Camera"	Leon Benson	Ellis Marcus	1954
61	22	"Comic Strip"	Herbert Strock	Stuart Jerome	1954
62	23	"Goon Squad"	Henry S. Kesler	Donn Mullally	1954
63	24	"Mailing List"	Leon Benson	Arthur Fitz-Richard	1954
64	25	"Convicts"	Lew Landers	Rik Vollaerts	1954
65	26	"Investments"	Henry S. Kesler	Leonard Heideman	1954
66	27	"The Son"	Herbert Strock	Arthur Fitz-Richard	1955
67	28	"Vandalism"	Henry S. Kesler	Jack Rock	1955
68	29	"Revolt"	Henry S. Kesler	Ellis Marcus	1955
69	30	"Brainwashed"	Herbert Strock	Donn Mullally	1955
70	31	"Boss"	Henry S. Kesler	Stuart Jerome	1955
71	32	"Mr. and Mrs. Club"	Lambert Hillyer	Richard G. Taylor	1955
72	33	"Oilfield"	Herbert Strock	Rik Vollaerts	1955
73	34	"Lost Report"	Herbert Strock	Arthur Fitz-Richard	1955
74	35	"Church"	Henry S. Kesler	Jack Rock	1955
75	36	"Commie Dies"	Henry S. Kesler	Ellis Marcus	1955
76	37	"Child Commie"	Henry S. Kesler	Leonard Heideman	1955
77	38	"Comrade Eva"	Herbert Strock	Stuart Jerome	1955
78	39	"Christmas Charity Bracket"	León Benson	Donn Mullally and Baruch J. Cohon	1955

=== Season 3 (1955–56) ===
No. overall	No. in season	Title	Directed by	Written by	Original release date
79	1	"Housebreaking"	Henry S. Kesler	Stuart Jerome	1955
80	2	"Attack Area"	Henry S. Kesler	Jack Rock	1955
81	3	"Rendezvous"	Eddie Davis	Ellis Marcus	1955
82	4	"Sacrificed"	Leon Benson	Donn Mullally	1955
83	5	"Eva Sick"	Eddie Davis	Stuart Jerome	1955
84	6	"Project Athlete"	Henry S. Kesler	Leonard Heideman	1955
85	7	"Lawyer"	Jack Herzberg	Ellis Marcus	1955
86	8	"Newsreel"	Henry S. Kesler	Rik Vollaerts	1955
87	9	"Ex G.I."	Jack Herzberg	Stuart Jerome	1955
88	10	"Common Denominator"	Lambert Hillyer	Donn Mullally	1955
89	11	"Stolen Passport"	Eddie Davis	Leonard Heideman	1955
90	12	"Exchange Student"	Leslie Goodwins	Jack Rock	1955
91	13	"Prisoner"	Lambert Hillyer	Rik Vollaerts	1955
92	14	"Instruction Camp"	Herbert Strock	Herbert Strock	1955
93	15	"Second Courier"	Herbert Strock	Stuart Jerome	1955
94	16	"Phony Brother"	Herbert Strock	Leonard Berg	1955
95	17	"Trapped"	Jack Herzberg	Ellis Marcus	1955
96	18	"Mother-in-Law"	Henry S. Kesler	Leonard Heideman	1955
97	19	"Central American Assignment"	Henry S. Kesler	Ellis Marcus	1955

== In popular culture ==
According to his brother, the show was a favorite of Lee Harvey Oswald, the assassin of U.S. President John F. Kennedy. Robert Oswald recalled "he became really engrossed in that particular television show. I think he just liked the atmosphere that you could do anything that you wanted to do, that you could imagine you could do".

The title of the TV series I Had Three Wives, which aired briefly in 1985, is a pun on the name of the original; it was an otherwise unrelated comedy-drama about a private detective's three ex-wives, who cooperate on cases.
