= Rocky Fund =

American politician

Member of the Kansas House of Representatives from the 50th district
- In office January 8, 2007 – April 28, 2011
- Preceded by: Becky Hutchins
- Succeeded by: Trent LeDoux

Personal details
- Born: August 5, 1950 Sabetha, Kansas, U.S.
- Died: April 28, 2011 (aged 60) Hoyt, Kansas, U.S.
- Party: Republican
- Spouse: Linda
- Education: Wichita State University

Military service
- Allegiance: United States
- Branch/service: United States Air Force
- Battles/wars: Vietnam War

Roy "Rocky" D. Fund (August 5, 1950 - April 28, 2011) was a Republican member of the Kansas House of Representatives, representing the 50th district. He served from 2007 until his death in 2011. The Americans for Prosperity - Kansas Chapter gave him an 85% rating on conservative issues.

Fund worked as a District Manager for the Water District.

== Committee membership ==
- Energy and Utilities
- Federal and State Affairs
- Agriculture and Natural Resources (Vice-chair)
- Joint Committee on Special Claims Against the State

== Major Donors ==
The top 5 donors to Fund's 2008 campaign:

- 1. Prairie Band Potawatomi Nation $1,000
- 2. Kansas Contractors Assoc $1,000
- 3. Kansas Optometric Assoc $750
- 4. AT&T $750
- 5. Kansas Medical Society $500

== Obituary ==
"Representative Rocky Fund was born August 5, 1950 in Sabetha, Kansas, the 5th of 7 children. His parents, Marty and Aleck Fund lived on a farm near Goff, Kansas. He attended school in Goff and graduated from Wetmore High School. After graduation, he joined the air force, married Linda McKee, was stationed at McConnell Air Force Base in Wichita, KS and served in Southeast Asia during the Vietnam War. He returned home to Kansas, worked at Learjet and earned his bachelor's degree at Wichita State University. He also earned a Farrier's license from Oklahoma Farrier's College. Rocky was a horseshoer (farrier), in Wichita and northeast Kansas, a teacher and coach at Royal Valley and Jackson Heights for 21 years, served on the Rural Water District #3 Jackson County Water Board for 16 years before becoming its District Manager for 10 years. He was elected State Representative from the 50th district in 2006 and was serving his third term. Rocky was an Optimist, a member of the American Legion and Veterans of Foreign Wars."

Published in Topeka Capital-Journal on April 30, 2011
