= The Magnetic Monster =

1953 film by Herbert L. Strock, Curt Siodmak

- Theatrical release half-sheet display poster
- Directed by: Curt Siodmak; Herbert L. Strock (uncredited)
- Written by: Curt Siodmak; Ivan Tors
- Produced by: Ivan Tors; George Van Marter
- Starring: Richard Carlson; King Donovan
- Narrated by: Richard Carlson
- Cinematography: Charles Van Enger
- Edited by: Herbert L. Strock
- Music by: Blaine Sanford; Paul Beaver (uncredited conductor)
- Color process: Black and white
- Production company: Ivan Tors Films
- Distributed by: United Artists
- Release date: February 18, 1953
- Running time: 76 minutes
- Country: United States
- Language: English
- Budget: $105,000 (estimated)

The Magnetic Monster is a 1953 independently made American science fiction horror film produced by Ivan Tors and George Van Marter, directed by Curt Siodmak and (uncredited) Herbert L. Strock. The film stars Richard Carlson, King Donovan, and Jean Byron. Strother Martin appears briefly in one scene as an airliner co-pilot. The film was released by United Artists.

Magnetic Monster is the first feature film in Ivan Tors' "Office of Scientific Investigation" (OSI) trilogy, which was followed by Riders to the Stars (1954) and Gog (1954).

The Magnetic Monster marked Carlson's initial foray into science fiction and horror films; he would follow it with It Came from Outer Space (1953), The Maze (1953), Riders to the Stars (1954), Creature from the Black Lagoon (1954), and such TV series as Thriller and Voyage to the Bottom of the Sea.

== Plot ==
A pair of agents from the Office of Scientific Investigation (OSI), Dr. Jeffrey Stewart and Dr. Dan Forbes, are sent to investigate a strange anomaly at a local appliance store. All of the store's clocks have stopped at the same time, while metal items in the store have become magnetized. A source for this is traced to an office located directly above the store, where a variety of scientific equipment is found, along with a dead body. There are also signs of radioactivity, but the exact cause of the store's anomalies is clearly no longer in the room or even in the immediate area.

An investigation and a request for citizen input eventually leads to an airline flight carrying a scientist, Dr. Howard Denker (Leonard Mudie), who has developed signs of radiation sickness related to something he is carrying in a heavy briefcase and which he clutches irrationally. Before dying, he confesses to experimenting with an artificial radioactive isotope, serranium, which he had bombarded with alpha particles for 200 hours (8 days and 8 hours). Unfortunately, his so-far microscopic creation has taken on a life of its own: the new, unstable isotope must absorb energy from its surroundings every 11 hours; with every cycle, it doubles in both size and mass, releasing deadly radiation and incredibly intense magnetic energy.

The OSI's officials determine that, with its rate of growth, it will only be a matter of weeks before the isotope becomes heavy enough to affect the Earth's rotation on its axis, eventually causing it to break out of its orbit around the Sun. They also discover that the isotope is impervious to any known means of destruction or rendering it inert. Stewart hypothesizes that the isotope could be "overfed" and bombarded with enough energy to cause it to fission into two separate, stable elements, but their computer calculations indicate that this process would require nearly one gigavolt of electricity. The only answer appears to be using a Canadian experimental power generator, dubbed the Deltatron, that's being constructed in a cavern underneath the ocean.

The two governments agree on this proposal, and the isotope is transported to the Deltatron project site, but there is a last-minute objection from Dr. Benton, the engineer in charge. With no time left, the lead OSI agent, Dr. Jeffrey Stewart, commandeers the huge device, a cavern-filling, multi-story machine. He risks his life by activating it and revving it up to maximum output, barely escaping just before sealing off the cavern. The machine powers up and the isotope is successfully pushed beyond its limits, completely destroying it, although the Deltatron has also been destroyed in the process. The traces of magnetism, which it had produced after every previous energy absorption, has now disappeared.

The Earth has been saved from destruction by the efforts of the Office of Scientific Investigation (OSI). All life returns to normal, as shown by the lead OSI agent, Dr. Jeffrey Stewart and his pregnant wife Connie; they complete the purchase of their first house and move in shortly thereafter.

== Cast ==
- Richard Carlson as Dr. Jeffrey Stewart
- King Donovan as Dr. Dan Forbes
- Jean Byron as Connie Stewart
- Harry Ellerbe as Dr. Allard
- Leo Britt as Dr. Benton
- Leonard Mudie as Howard Denker
- Byron Foulger as Mr. Simon
- Michael Fox as Dr. Serny
- John Zaremba as Chief Watson (credited as John Zarimba)
- Michael Granger as Kenneth Smith
- Lee Phelps as City Engineer
- Watson Downs as The Mayor
- Roy Engel as General Behan (credited as Roy Engle)
- Frank Gerstle as Colonel Willis
- John Vosper as Captain Dyer
- John Dodsworth as Dr. Carthwright
- Billy Benedict as Albert
- Charles Williams as Cabbie
- Kathleen Freeman as Nellie, The Operator
- Robert Carson as The Pilot (uncredited)
- Douglas Evans as Pilot
- Strother Martin as Co-Pilot
- Donald Kerr as Nova Scotia Lab Worker (uncredited)

== Production notes ==
For the Deltatron, the film used ten minutes of footage of the atom smasher from the German science fiction thriller Gold (1934), directed by Karl Hartl and produced by UFA.

Although the music was composed by Blaine Sanford, it was in fact performed by Paul Beaver.

The Los Alamos MANIAC computer was featured in an effort to lend a scientific air to the film. The UCLA differential analyzer from the same era is also shown briefly for the same reason.
