= Riverboat (TV series) =

American television series

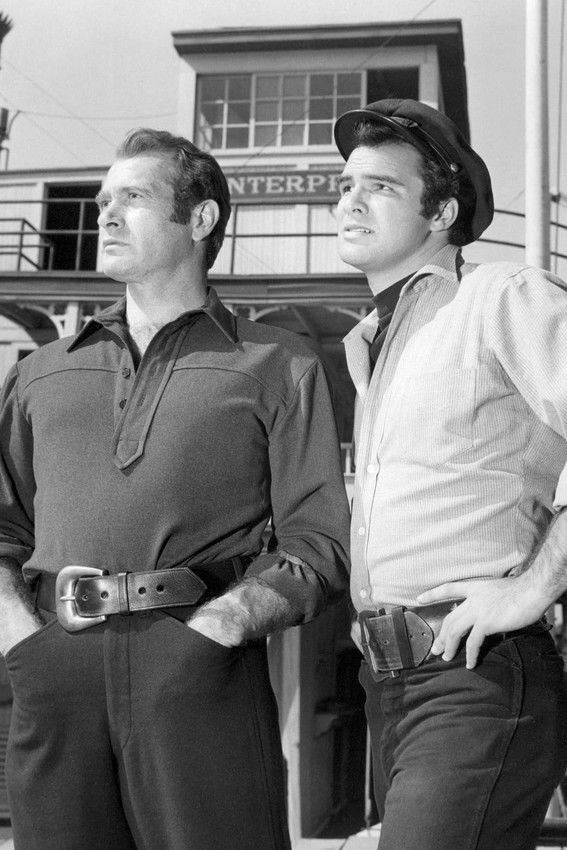
- Darren McGavin and Burt Reynolds
- Starring: Darren McGavin; Burt Reynolds; Noah Beery, Jr.
- Composers: Elmer Bernstein (season one); Gerald Fried; Fred Steiner; Alexander Courage; Al Woodbury; Leo Shuken; Jack Hayes
- Country of origin: United States
- Original language: English
- No. of seasons: 2
- No. of episodes: 44

Production
- Production companies: Meladare Co. Productions; Revue Studios

Original release
- Network: NBC
- Release: September 13, 1959 – January 2, 1961

Riverboat is an American Western television series starring Darren McGavin and Burt Reynolds, produced by Revue Studios, and broadcast on the NBC television network from 1959 to 1961. Reynolds was replaced by Noah Beery Jr. halfway through the series in the wake of conflicts with McGavin.

== Plot ==
In the series, Captain Grey Holden and his crew navigate the vessel called the Enterprise principally along the Mississippi, Missouri, and Ohio Rivers. Some episodes are set in the eastern end of the American West or in the Midwest. Holden and his men encounter interesting characters along the way, including U.S. President Zachary Taylor, General Winfield Scott and a prepresidential Abraham Lincoln. One episode focuses indirectly on the Texan Revolution of 1836. Unlike most Westerns, which are set after the American Civil War, the story's time frame precedes the conflict, and includes the 1830s and the 1840s. The series ended on the NBC midseason schedule in January 1961, replaced by a drama about the sectional conflict, The Americans.

== Cast ==
Darren McGavin played Captain Grey Holden for 40 episodes. Dan Duryea played Captain Brad Turner for two episodes while McGavin was embroiled in contract disputes. Burt Reynolds, in his television debut, played McGavin's partner and chief pilot Ben Frazer in 20 episodes, and was replaced by Noah Beery, Jr., who played Bill Blake, for Season Two.

Dick Wessel, as chief stoker Carney Kohler, was cast in 41 episodes; Jack Lambert was cast in 23 episodes as first mate Joshua MacGregor (having played a different character, Tony Walchek, earlier in the series); John Mitchum co-starred in 10 episodes as Pickalong, the ship's cook; Michael McGreevey was cast in 17 episodes as cabin boy Chip Kessler; and William D. Gordon played first mate Joe Travis in 13 episodes before his character's death.

== Episodes ==
=== Season 1: 1959–60 ===
No. overall	No. in season	Title	Directed by	Written by	Original release date
1	1	"Payment in Full"	Douglas Heyes	Douglas Heyes	September 13, 1959
2	2	"The Barrier"	Richard Bartlett	Tom Seller	September 20, 1959
3	3	"About Roger Mowbray"	Felix E. Feist	Story by : Gene L. Coon; Teleplay by : Hagar Wilde	September 27, 1959
4	4	"Race to Cincinnati"	Jules Bricken	Story by : Richard Morgan; Teleplay by : William Raynor	October 4, 1959
5	5	"The Unwilling"	Richard Bartlett	Norman Jolley	October 11, 1959
6	6	"The Fight Back"	Jules Bricken	Story by : Robert E. Thompson; Teleplay by : Mel Goldberg & Robert E. Thompson	October 18, 1959
7	7	"Escape to Memphis"	John Rich	Story by : Richard B. Larkin; Teleplay by : Bob and Wanda Duncan	October 25, 1959
8	8	"Witness No Evil"	Richard Bartlett	Norman Jolley	November 1, 1959
9	9	"A Night at Trapper's Landing"	Felix E. Feist	Halsey Melone	November 8, 1959
10	10	"The Faithless"	Richard Bartlett	Story by : Kay Linaker & Richard Morgan & Howard Phillips; Teleplay by : Richard Morgan	November 22, 1959
11	11	"The Boy from Pittsburgh"	Frank Arrigo	Story by : John Francis Larkin; Teleplay by : George Tibbles	November 29, 1959
12	12	"Jessie Quinn"	Jules Bricken	Tom Seller	December 6, 1959
13	13	"Strange Request"	John Rich	Clair Huffaker	December 13, 1959
14	14	"Guns for Empire"	Herman Hoffman	Samuel A. Peeples	December 20, 1959
15	15	"The Face of Courage"	William Witney	Bob and Wanda Duncan	December 27, 1959
16	16	"Tampico Raid"	Richard Bartlett	Richard Morgan	January 3, 1960
17	17	"Landlubbers"	William Witney	Tom Seller	January 10, 1960
18	18	"The Blowup"	Darren McGavin	Al C. Ward	January 18, 1960
19	19	"Forbidden Island"	Stanley Lanfield	Bob and Wanda Duncan	January 24, 1960
20	20	"Salvage Pirates"	Richard Bartlett	Richard Morgan	January 31, 1960
21	21	"Path of the Eagle"	Jules Bricken	Halsey Melone	February 1, 1960
22	22	"The Treasure of Hawk Hill"	William Witney	Bob and Wanda Duncan	February 8, 1960
23	23	"Fight at New Canal"	R.G. Springsteen	Tom Seller	February 22, 1960
24	24	"The Wichita Arrows"	William Witney	Bob and Wanda Duncan	February 29, 1960
25	25	"Fort Epitaph"	John Brahm	Richard Morgan	March 7, 1960
26	26	"Three Graves"	William Witney	Al C. Ward	March 14, 1960
27	27	"Hang the Men High"	Hollingsworth Morse	Jerry Adelman	March 21, 1960
28	28	"The Night of the Faceless Man"	William Witney	Bob and Wanda Duncan	March 28, 1960
29	29	"The Long Trail"	Hollingsworth Morse	Oscar Saul	April 4, 1960
30	30	"The Quick Noose"	Hollingsworth Morse	Tom Seller	April 11, 1960
31	31	"The Sellout"	Richard Bartlett	Story by : R. Hamer Norris; Teleplay by : Ann Wesley	April 18, 1960

=== Season 2: 1960–61 ===
No. overall	No. in season	Title	Directed by	Written by	Original release date
32	1	"End of a Dream "	David Lowell Rich	Milton S. Gelman	September 19, 1960
33	2	"That Taylor Affair"	Allen H. Miner	Allen H. Miner	September 26, 1960
34	3	"The Two Faces of Grey Holden"	R.G. Springsteen	Kathleen Hite	October 3, 1960
35	4	"River Champion"	William Witney	William Jerome Fay & Hendrik Vollaerts	October 10, 1960
36	5	"No Bridge on the River"	Lamont Johnson	Raphael Hayes	October 24, 1960
37	6	"Trunk Full of Dreams"	Hollingsworth Morse	Gwen Bagni & Irwin Gielgud	October 31, 1960
38	7	"The Water of Gorgeous Springs"	Richard Bartlett	Raphael Hayes & Montgomery Pittman	November 7, 1960
39	8	"Devil in Skirts"	David Lowell Rich	Gwen Bagni & Bob Duncan & Irwin Gielgud	November 21, 1960
40	9	"The Quota"	Hollingsworth Morse	Bob Duncan & Wanda Duncan & Raphael Hayes	November 28, 1960
41	10	"Chicota Landing"	David Lowell Rich	Herman Groves & Raphael Hayes	December 5, 1960
42	11	"Duel on the River"	Tay Garnett	Milton S. Gelman	December 12, 1960
43	12	"Zigzag"	Sidney Lanfield	David Lang	December 26, 1960
44	13	"Listen to the Nightingale"	Sidney Lanfield	Fred Freiberger & Philip MacDonald	January 2, 1961

== Guest stars ==
=== Female guest stars ===
The series featured an array of leading ladies of that era as guest stars, including Mary Tyler Moore, cast as the "Brunette Girl in Coach", with Jeanne Carmen as Janine, the "Blonde Girl in Coach", in the 1959 episode, "A Night at Trapper's Landing". Moore played Lily Belle de Lesseps the next year in "Trunk Full of Dreams" (1960).

Other female guest stars include:

- Mary Adams
- Jeanne Bal
- Jeanne Bates
- Anne Baxter
- Barbara Bel Geddes
- Whitney Blake
- Jocelyn Brando
- Virginia Christine
- Jeanne Crain
- Norma Crane
- Pat Crowley
- Arlene Dahl
- Dianne Foster
- Mona Freeman
- Beverly Garland
- Connie Hines
- Sherry Jackson
- Bethel Leslie
- Nan Leslie
- Mercedes McCambridge
- Patricia Medina
- Vera Miles
- Elizabeth Montgomery
- Joanna Moore
- Debra Paget
- Suzanne Pleshette
- Madlyn Rhue
- Gena Rowlands
- Fay Spain
- Karen Steele
- Jan Sterling
- Stella Stevens
- Barbara Stuart
- Gloria Talbott

=== Male guest stars ===
Many male guest stars also appeared on Riverboat. Ricardo Montalbán portrayed United States Army Lt. Andre B. Devereaux in "A Night at Trapper's Landing" (November 8, 1959). In the story line, the Enterprise is commandeered by the military for a punitive expedition against the Indians after an attack on Devereaux and his men. Ben Frazer, however, tries to convince the Army that the uprising is really the result of a local Indian agent. The episode features Judson Pratt, as Sergeant Ned Bolger, Stacy Harris as Colonel Nicholson, and Raymond Bailey as General Jacoby, with other roles for character actors Morris Ankrum, R.G. Armstrong, and Peter Whitney.

Other male guest stars include:

- Eddie Albert, as Dan Simpson, with Russell Johnson as Darius, and John M. Pickard, from the Western series Boots and Saddles, uncredited as a river pirate, in "The Unwilling" (1959): In the story line, Dan Simpson attempts to open a general store despite a raid from pirates who stole $20,000 in merchandise. Debra Paget is cast as Lela Russell.
- Jack Albertson, as Sampson J. Binton, and DeForest Kelley as Alex Jeffords, in the series finale, "Listen to the Nightingale" (1961): Holden and Blake transport an opera singer (Jeanne Bal) and her musicians to New Orleans in exchange for a share of her concert receipts.
- Robert Bray, prior to Stagecoach West, as Tom Byson, with Beverly Garland as Dr. Nora James, in "Three Graves" (1960), the story of three mysterious recent graves in a river town.
- Charles Bronson, as Crowley, with Ray Teal as Sheriff Clay, in "Zigzag" (1960): Bill Blake (Noah Beery Jr.) is at a doctor's office in a river town when he is abducted by three outlaws who think that Blake is the doctor. The outlaws then demand that Blake pretend to be the son of a dying old man so he can compel the man to reveal the location of a large amount of money in his possession. William Fawcett is cast as Pinty Walters, the owner of the cabin where the old man is living. Stella Stevens plays Pinty's daughter, Lisa.
- Edgar Buchanan, as Wingate Pritchard Pardee in "Duel on the River" (1960): Holden and his crew come between Brian Cloud (Robert Emhardt), a regional cotton baron, and a dissident grower, Beaudry Rawlings (Claude Akins), and Beaudry's ambitious wife, Laurie (Fay Spain), who is a cousin of Pardee's. Akins also appeared as Jarret Sutton in "Escape to Memphis" (1959); Sutton pursues his former sister-in-law Laura Sutton (Jeanne Crain), a passenger on the Enterprise, who has killed her husband (his brother) in self-defense. Forrest Lewis appears in this episode as Mr. Chambers.
- Richard Carlson, as Paul Drake in "The Faithless" (1959): Drake is an escaped prisoner with medical training being transported on the Enterprise back to jail. Having lost his religious faith, Drake refuses to render medical assistance to a two-year-old girl stricken with a communicable disease that threatens the entire vessel. William Phipps and Jeanne Bates play the parents of the child. Bethel Leslie portrays Cathy Norris.
- Anthony Caruso, as the Cherokee Chief White Bull in "The Long Trail" (1960): A group of Indians is being transported on the Enterprise, rather than walking the Trail of Tears to their reservation in Indian Territory. Harry Lauter and Dennis Cross also appear in this episode.
- Richard Chamberlain, as Lt. Dave Winslow in "Chicota Landing" (1960): In the story line, Juan Cortilla, a Mexican bandit played by Joe De Santis, is stormed from jail. Lieutenant Winslow asks Holden to transport Cortilla and his men to a military garrison. Instead, Cortilla takes over the Enterprise and its gunpowder. Connie Hines portrays Lucy Bridges, and Ted de Corsia is cast as another bandit.
- Lloyd Corrigan, as John Jenkins, with Anne Baxter as Ellie Jenkins, in "A Race to Cincinnati" (1959): Three ruthless men try to prevent a peach farmer from getting his crop to market in Cincinnati: He will lose his valuable land if he cannot make the last payment to his creditors.
- Francis De Sales, as Ed Baker, with child actor Tom Nolan as Tommy Jones, a stowaway, in "The Boy from Pittsburgh" (1959): Series character Grey Holden transports a box of diamonds, not knowing that a pickpocket has taken the gems and switched the contents of the box. King Donovan is cast as Paddy Britt; Mona Freeman is Louise Rutherford, a beautiful young widow; Robert Emhardt is Jeb Carter.
- Dan Duryea, as Captain Brad Turner, in "The Wichita Arrows" (1960): Turner is in temporary command of the Enterprise while Grey Holden is recruiting new customers. Turner stops at a river town to collect fur pelts, but finds the proprietors of the establishment all dead with arrows in their backs. In the following episode, "Fort Epitaph" (1960), Captain Turner takes a cargo of cannon to a fort on the Little Missouri River within hostile Sioux country. Turner soon finds that the once-peaceful Indians have been driven to rebellion by the tough commander of the fort, who commandeers the Enterprise and orders its crew to attack the Sioux.
- Buddy Ebsen, as Niles Cox, with Gregory Walcott as Salem Cox, in "The Water of Gorgeous Springs" (1960): Two hillbilly families, the Coxes and the Jenningses, are engaged in a murderous feud aboard the Enterprise on which they find themselves as unlikely traveling companions. Barry Atwater is cast as Gould Jennings, Joycelyn Brando is Charity Jennings, and Sherry Jackson is Inez Cox. Less than two years later, Buddy Ebsen rocketed to national stardom in the CBS sitcom, The Beverly Hillbillies. This episode aired the night before the 1960 presidential election.
- Gene Evans, as Sgt. Dan Phillips, James Griffith as Crpl. Sam Giler, Ron Hagerthy as Phelan, and Stuart Randall as General Winfield Scott in "The Quota" (1960): Sergeant Phillips shanghais Holden and a crew member to meet the Army's "quota" of new recruits.
- Paul Fix, known as Sheriff Micah Torrance on The Rifleman, as President Taylor in "That Taylor Affair" (1960), with Arlene Dahl as Lucy Belle.
- Bruce Gordon, as Garnett in "Forbidden Island" (1960), the story of Cajun outlaws who inhabit a remote island.
- Clu Gulager, prior to his role as Billy the Kid on NBC's The Tall Man, as Beau Chandler, and Kevin Hagen as John Hollister, in "Jessie Quinn" (1959), a tale of intrigue involving the Texas Revolution: Holden attempts to send weapons to Sam Houston, but forces of Antonio Lopez de Santa Anna in Mexico threaten to blow up the Enterprise to prevent the delivery. Mercedes McCambridge is cast in the title role of this episode.
- John Ireland, as Chris Slade, and Karl Swenson as Ansel Torgin, in "The Fight Back" (1959): Young Tom Fowler (Tom Laughlin) has made himself the boss of Hampton, a corrupt river town near Vicksburg. Fowler blocks farmers from shipping their crops to market. In a dispute over a wedding held on the Enterprise, a lynch mob led by Fowler comes after Holden.
- Douglas Kennedy, as McLeigh in "The Night of the Faceless Men" (1960): Broadcaster Hugh Downs portrays Dan Flynn; Frank Ferguson is cast as Roger. In the story line, while he is seeking to purchase wood, Holden encounters a river town in the clutches of hooded racketeers.
- George Kennedy, as Gunner Slagle, with Slim Pickens as Porter Slagle; Dennis O'Keefe as boxing promoter Dan Muldoon, and Norma Crane as Sarah Prentice, in "River Champion" (1960), a story about a prize fight aboard the Enterprise.
- Sandy Kenyon, as lawyer Abraham Lincoln, with Tyler McVey as a judge and Denver Pyle as Jim Bledsoe, in "No Bridge on the River" (1960): Holden sues the railroad when the Enterprises on a dark and stormy night strikes a rail bridge atop the Mississippi River; Lincoln is the attorney representing the railroad.
- Dayton Lummis, as Gideon Templeton in "Path of the Eagle" (1960); a group of wealthy travelers hire Grey Holden to transport them to Independence, Missouri, where they will join a wagon train to the West. One of their party, however, conspires with river pirates to hijack the Enterprise and rob the passengers. Dianne Foster appears as Marian Templeton, with Myron Healey as Steven Barrows.
- Raymond Massey, prior to the television series Dr. Kildare, as Sir Oliver Garnett in "Trunk Full of Dreams" (1960): The Enterprise becomes a floating theater when a group of actors comes on board. Bethel Leslie is cast as Juliet, Willard Waterman is de Lesseps, Mary Tyler Moore is Lily Belle, and Robert Foulk is Captain Smiley.
- Doug McClure, prior to The Virginian, as Corporal Jenkins in "The Face of Courage" (1959): Amid the threat of Sioux attack, the Enterprise is commandeered by Sergeant Major Carmody (Paul Birch) while it is delivering military cargo to an Army outpost on the Missouri River. Joanna Moore appears in this episode as Kitty McGuire.
- Stephen McNally as Jeb Randall, with Stuart Randall as Harry, in "Hang the Men High" (1960): Based on the word of a dying man, two passengers are seized from the Enterprise and tried before a kangaroo court. Walter Sande is cast as Tom Feller and Karen Steele is Sue Parker.
- Read Morgan, as Clint Casey in "The Barrier" (1959): Passengers included a young man on assignment to become an Indian agent in the West and the miscreant who tries to bribe the agent to allow liquor sales on the reservation. William Bendix is cast as Vance Muldoon, and Elizabeth Montgomery is Mrs. Abigai Carruthers.
- Ed Nelson, prior to Peyton Place, as Tim Tyler in "The Quick Noose" (1960): Enterprise crew member Carney Kohler could hang for the fatal stabbing of the son of Judge Wingate. The murderer used Kohler's knife to carry out the crime. Willis Bouchey plays the judge.
- Vincent Price, as Otto Justin in "Witness No Evil" (1959): Justin is transporting exotic animals on the Enterprise, from Natchez, Mississippi, for use in a traveling circus headquartered in St. Louis, Missouri. One of the animals, Koko the Ape, can steal passengers' valuables from their rooms and then flee at will.
- Cliff Robertson, as Martinus Van Der Brig, with Robert J. Wilke as Red Dog Hanlon, in "End of a Dream" (1960): Con man Van Der Brig persuades Holden to transport a group of pioneers to "Rolling Stone", a tract of land which he recently purchased, but cannot match the expectations of the settlers.
- Lee Van Cleef, as Luke Cragg in "Strange Request" (1959): Jan Sterling as actress Lorna Langton charters the Enterprise for a trip to an abandoned trading post, where she retrieves a boy being held by river pirates who claim that he had been rescued from Indians. Lawrence Dobkin is cast as David Fields; Rhys Williams, as Josiah Cragg.
- Robert Vaughn, as the lead in "About Roger Mowbray" (1959): Cassie Baird (Madlyn Rhue), a former girlfriend of Roger Mowbray's, tells Mrs. Jeanette Mowbray (Vera Miles) that Roger married her for her money. Roger learns that his father is also undermining his marriage. John Hoyt is cast as Antoine Rigaud.
- Will Wright, curmudgeonly character actor, as J.C. Sickel, with Aldo Ray as Hunk Farber, John Larch as Touhy, and Barbara Bel Geddes as Missy, in "Payment in Full" (1959): Farber betrays his friend and employer to collect reward money, which he uses to court his girlfriend, Missy.

== Production ==
NBC hoped the series would defeat Maverick, a Western series which star James Garner would leave for a major theatrical film career a season later and be replaced by Roger Moore. Riverboat was described as "Wagon Train on water". Darren McGavin was known from playing Mike Hammer and Burt Reynolds was cast for romantic interest.

"We've spent a lot of money and put a lot of time into making it a quality show," said McGavin.

Reynolds reflected on the show in 2015:

I wasn’t happy on that show, probably because I wasn’t very good. In fact, I was bad. I did the best I could, but I really didn’t know what I was doing.

== Home media ==
On October 30, 2007, Timeless Media Group released a three-disc best-of set featuring 15 episodes from the series.

On May 15, 2012, Timeless Media Group released Riverboat – The Complete Series on DVD in Region 1.

== Reception ==
=== Critical ===
The New York Times called the pilot "labored and dull".

The Los Angeles Times said it was "produced with the slick vacuity of a B movie with pleasantly inconsequential stories and an utter disregard for the color and background that the Riverboat called for."

=== Ratings ===
The premiere episode rated 11.9 against Maverick's 22.9 and a rerun of That's My Boy with 7.5.

In January 1960, the series was shifted from Sunday nights to Monday.
