= King Donovan =

American actor and director

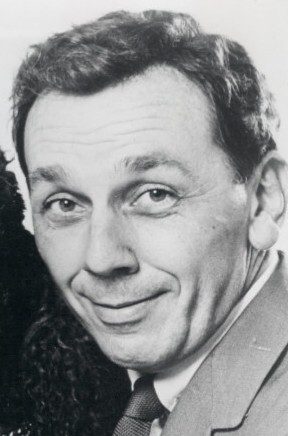
- King Donovan in 1968
- Born: Francis King Donovan; January 25, 1918; Manhattan, New York City, U.S.
- Died: June 30, 1987 (aged 69); Branford, Connecticut, U.S.
- Occupations: Actor; director
- Years active: 1948–1984
- Spouse: Imogene Coca (m. 1960–1987, his death)
- Children: 3

Francis King Donovan (January 25, 1918 – June 30, 1987) was an American film, stage, and television actor, as well as a film and television director.

== Early years ==
King Donovan was born in Manhattan on January 25, 1918. His parents were vaudevillians who traveled nationwide in the United States, and at three weeks old he began traveling with them. He attended Mt. Joseph School in Buffalo, New York through eighth grade, after which he went to work. His acting debut occurred in his teenage years at the Butler Davenport Theater.

== Acting work ==
=== Radio ===
Donovan worked in radio before serving in the U.S. Army Air Forces for three years. After he left the military, he returned to radio and worked on stage on the West Coast.

=== Film ===
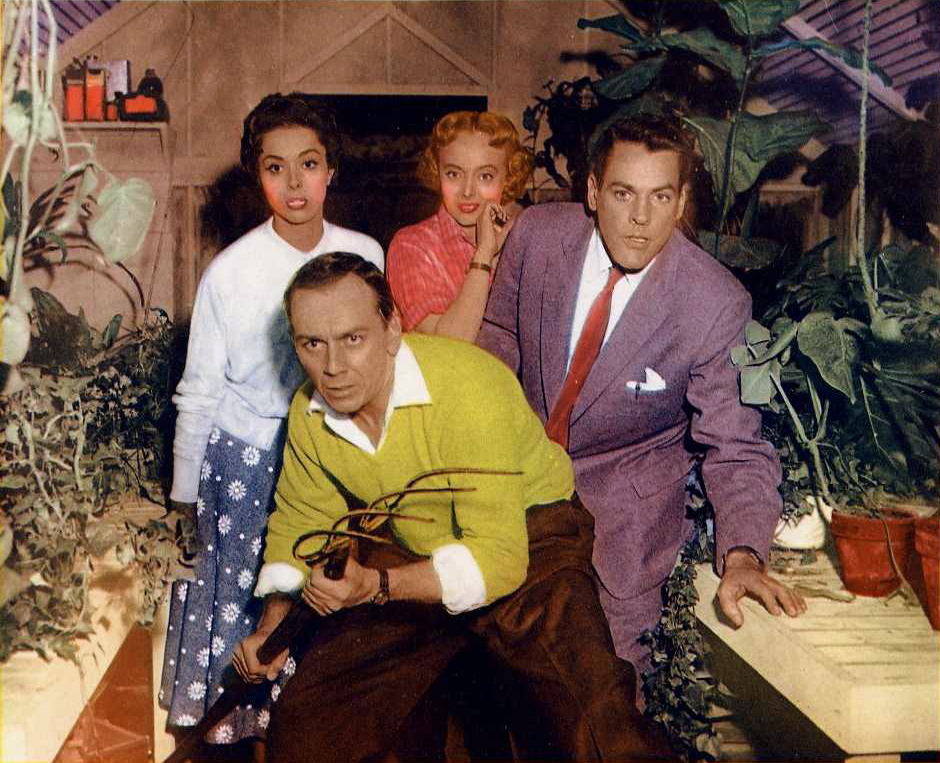
Invasion of the Body Snatchers cast (clockwise from top center), Carolyn Jones, Kevin McCarthy, King Donovan, and Dana Wynter.

Donovan's film debut occurred in The Man from Texas (1947). His film acting work includes Jack in the original Invasion of the Body Snatchers (a role later reprised by Jeff Goldblum in the 1978 version), Solly in The Defiant Ones, Joe Capper in Cowboy, Mack McGee in the original Angels in the Outfield, Major Collins in The Perfect Furlough, and an uncredited but recognizable role in Singin' in the Rain as Rod (head of the Publicity Department). Donovan left the film industry in the late 1950s because, he said, he hated "about 90 percent of what I was doing".

=== Stage ===
Donovan was part of the Jitney Players traveling troupe in the 1940s. He performed with the Hendrickson Shakespearean Company for two years, and he appeared in The Male Animal for the USO. In 1948, Donovan appeared on Broadway in The Vigil (1948), The Girls in 509 (1958) and Morning's at Seven (1980). In 1968, he toured with his wife Imogene Coca in a productions of You Know I Can't Hear You When the Water's Running and Once upon a Mattress.

=== Television ===
Notable television roles include Jake Clampett (a deadbeat who mooches off the Clampetts) for two episodes of CBS's The Beverly Hillbillies, Blanche Morton's (Bea Benaderet's) brother Roger Baker on eight episodes of The George Burns and Gracie Allen Show, and Harvey Helm in a 17-episode stint on NBC's The Bob Cummings Show. Donovan also appeared in six episodes as Chris Norman of It's a Great Life. About this time, he also guest starred on Ray Bolger's ABC sitcom, Where's Raymond? and the NBC sitcom, The People's Choice, with Jackie Cooper. He also guest starred on the crime drama, Richard Diamond, Private Detective. In 1956 he appeared as Joe Baker on the TV western Cheyenne in the episode titled "Mustang Trail." He also played in a 1960 episode of Shotgun Slade. He played a petty thief Name Baxter who stole from an orphanage. He portrayed Marty in "Academy Award," a 1957 episode of the CBS situation comedy Mr. Adams and Eve. He played Mark Dawson in the 1959 Maverick episode "Maverick Springs". He was also in Wanted: Dead or Alive in the 1959 episode "Bad Gun" as the gun dealer Sheridan Appleby. In the 1963 episode "The Clampetts Go Hollywood", King Donovan portrays Jake Clampett.

He played Twirly Boggs in the 1960 TV series Bonanza, season 1 episode 19 'The Gunmen'. Donovan guest starred as Paddy Britt in the 1959 episode "The Boy from Pittsburgh" of the NBC western series, Riverboat.

In 1963, he played the part of Poke Tolliver in the episode "Incident of the Buryin' Man" on CBS's Rawhide. Between 1965 and 1967, Donovan had a recurring role as neighbor Herb, whose mission in life seemed to be getting from his house through the study window of professor Jim Nash in less than a full minute, on the situation comedy Please Don't Eat the Daisies.

== Directing work ==
In 1963 Donovan directed the film Promises! Promises!, which received attention as the first Hollywood sound film to feature a mainstream film star (Jayne Mansfield) nude. Later the same year Donovan directed two episodes of Grindl, which starred his wife Imogene Coca, and two more the next year.

== Personal life and death ==
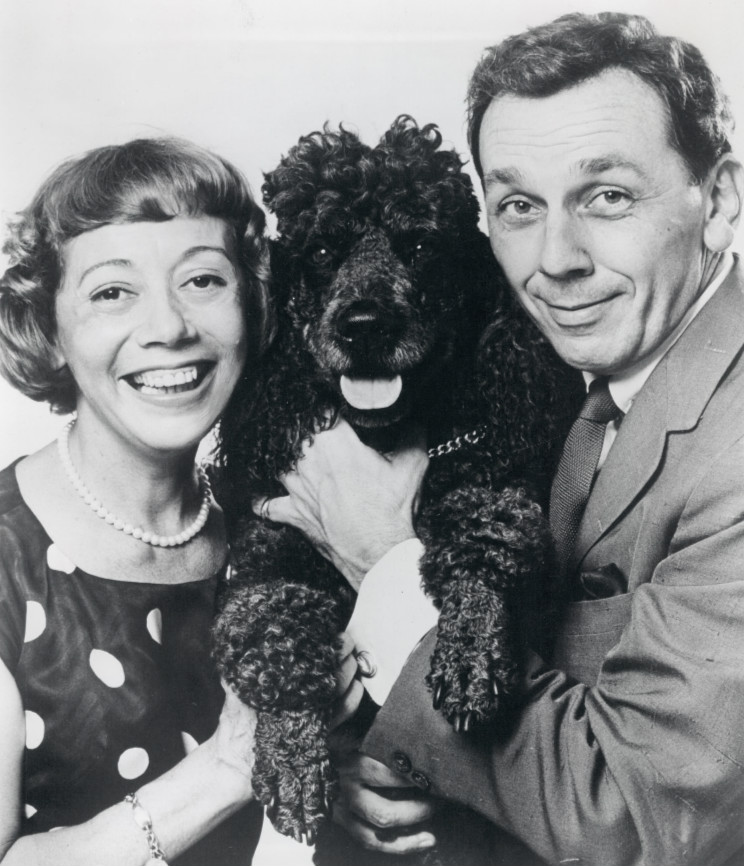
Donovan and wife Imogene Coca

Previously married and the father of three children, Donovan married actress/ comedian Imogene Coca on October 17, 1960. They remained married until his death from cancer on June 30, 1987, aged 69, in the Connecticut Hospice in Branford, Connecticut.

== Filmography ==
As an actor
Title	Year	Role	Notes
Open Secret	1948	Fawnes, Bigot Gang Member	film debut
Man from Texas	1948	Sam (mortgage officer)	Uncredited
Shockproof	1949	Joe Wilson	first time Donovan played a character with a first and last name Uncredited
Alias Nick Beal	1949	Peter Wolfe	Donovan's highest billed role (7th) at the time
I Was a Male War Bride	1949	Minor Role	Scenes deleted
All the King's Men	1949	Reporter	Won the Academy Award for Best Picture; Uncredited
The Pilgrimage Play	1949	Salathiel	
Side Street	1950	Det. Gottschalk	Uncredited
One Way Street	1950	Grieder	
Cargo to Capetown	1950	Sparky Jackson	stars John Ireland, the star of Donovan's debut film Uncredited
Mystery Street	1950	Reporter at Beach House	Uncredited
A Lady Without Passport	1950	Surgeon	Uncredited
Kiss Tomorrow Goodbye	1950	Driver	Uncredited
Right Cross	1950	Fifth Reporter	Uncredited
The Sun Sets at Dawn	1950	Reporter, National News Service	
Storm Warning	1951	Ambulance Driver	starred future president Ronald Reagan; Uncredited
The Enforcer	1951	Sgt. Whitlow	
The Great Missouri Raid	1951	Witness	Uncredited
Three Guys Named Mike	1951	Willy	Uncredited
The Redhead and the Cowboy	1951	Munroe	
The Scarf	1951	Piano Player	Uncredited
Little Big Horn	1951	Pvt. James Corbo	
The Prince Who Was a Thief	1951	Merat	Uncredited
Take Care of My Little Girl	1951	Cab Driver	Uncredited
His Kind of Woman	1951	Reporter	Uncredited
Angels in the Outfield	1951	Mack McGee	First Donovan film to be remade. First time Donovan appeared in a film trailer.
Behave Yourself!	1951	Lingerie Shop Manager	Uncredited
Come Fill the Cup	1951	Kip Zunches	Uncredited
The Unknown Man	1951	News Photographer on Courthouse Steps	Uncredited
Something to Live For	1952	Stage Manager	Uncredited
Singin' in the Rain	1952	Rod	Although his role is uncredited it is recognizable. Film voted best musical of the century and fifth best film of the century by AFI. Uncredited
Glory Alley	1952	Telephone Technician	Uncredited
Sally and Saint Anne	1952	Hymie Callahan	
The Merry Widow	1952	Nitki	
The Mississippi Gambler	1953	Spud	Uncredited
The Magnetic Monster	1953	Dr. Dan Forbes	
The Beast from 20,000 Fathoms	1953	Dr. Ingersoll	
Hannah Lee	1953	Sheriff's Deputy	Uncredited
The Kid from Left Field	1953	Bartender	Uncredited
The Caddy	1953	Drunk	Uncredited
Half a Hero	1953	Sam Radwell	
City of Bad Men	1953	Hotel Clerk	Uncredited
Three Sailors and a Girl	1953	Sailor	Uncredited
Easy to Love	1953	Ben	
Forever Female	1953	Playwright	
Tumbleweed	1953	Wrangler	
Riders to the Stars	1954	James O'Herli	
Broken Lance	1954	Clerk	Uncredited
Private Hell 36	1954	Evney Serovitch	Uncredited
The Bamboo Prison	1954	Pop	
The Seven Little Foys	1955	Harrison	Uncredited
Not as a Stranger	1955	Mr. Slocum	Uncredited
Invasion of the Body Snatchers	1956	Jack Belicec	
The Birds and the Bees	1956	Waiter	
The Iron Sheriff	1957	Leveret	
Cowboy	1958	Joe Capper - Trail Hand	
The Defiant Ones	1958	Solly	
The Perfect Furlough	1958	Maj. Collins	
The Hanging Tree	1959	Wonder	
The Thrill of It All	1963	TV Executive	Uncredited
It's a Mad, Mad, Mad, Mad World	1963	Airport Official	Uncredited
Nothing Lasts Forever	1984	Lunartini Husband	(final film role)

Donovan filmed scenes for an undetermined role in the 1949 film I Was a Male War Bride, but his scenes were deleted.

As director
Title	Date	Notes
Promises! Promises!	1963	First sound film to feature a mainstream film star (Jayne Mansfield) nude. Only film Donovan ever directed.
Grindl	1963–1964	Series starred Donovan's wife, Imogene Coca. 4 episodes
That Girl	1968	1 episode
