= Gog (film) =

1954 film by Herbert L. Strock

- Theatrical release poster
- Directed by: Herbert L. Strock
- Written by: Tom Taggart (screenplay); Ivan Tors (story); Richard G. Taylor (dialogue)
- Produced by: Ivan Tors
- Starring: Richard Egan; Constance Dowling; Herbert Marshall
- Cinematography: Lothrop B. Worth
- Edited by: Herbert L. Strock
- Music by: Harry Sukman
- Production company: Ivan Tors Productions
- Distributed by: United Artists
- Release dates: June 5, 1954 (Los Angeles); August 13, 1954 (New York City)
- Running time: 82 minutes
- Country: United States
- Language: English
- Budget: $250,000 (estimated)

Gog is a 1954 independently made American science fiction horror film produced by Ivan Tors, directed by Herbert L. Strock, and starring Richard Egan, Constance Dowling (in her final big-screen role), and Herbert Marshall. Gog was produced by Ivan Tors Productions and was filmed in Natural Vision 3D. The color process is credited to Color Corporation of America. The film was distributed by United Artists in June 1954.

Gog is the third and final feature film in Ivan Tors' "Office of Scientific Investigation" (OSI) trilogy, following The Magnetic Monster (1953) and Riders to the Stars (1954).

== Plot ==
Unaccountable, deadly malfunctions begin occurring at a top-secret government facility located under the New Mexico desert, where a space station is being constructed. Dr. David Sheppard, from the Office of Scientific Investigation (OSI) in Washington, D.C., is called in to investigate the mysterious deaths. Working with Joanna Merritt, another OSI agent already at the facility, Sheppard determines that the deaths among the laboratory's 150 top scientists are due to sabotage of the facility's Nuclear Operative Variable Automatic Computer (NOVAC), which controls and co-ordinates all the equipment in the underground facility.

Sheppard struggles to determine how the sabotage is being done. The unseen enemy controlling the malfunctions kills five scientists and two human test subjects in quick succession, as well as Major Howard, the complex's Chief of Security. In addition, both Madame Elzevir (solar engineering scientist) and Dr. Peter Burden (chief atomic engineer) are attacked and injured, but manage to survive.

Eventually, Sheppard determines that a powerful radio transmitter and receiver were secretly built into NOVAC during its construction in Switzerland, without the knowledge or consent of its designer, Dr. Zeitman. An enemy robot plane, whose fiberglass body does not register on radar, has been flying overhead, beaming precisely focused, ultra-high-frequency radio signals into the complex to control NOVAC's every function. The computer, in turn, controls Gog and Magog, two huge mobile robots with multiple arms, powerful gripping tools, and other implements.

Magog is finally directed to go to the complex's nuclear reactor control room and pull the safety rod out of the atomic pile, starting a chain reaction that will build to a nuclear explosion, which in turn will destroy the entire facility. Sheppard arrives in time to push the safety rod back into the pile, stopping the chain reaction. He then attacks the robot with a flame thrower and disables it, but Gog soon follows its twin to the reactor room to finish the job. Sheppard's flame thrower runs out of fuel as the robot advances on him. Dr. Van Ness arrives with another flame thrower, but the control valve sticks, and Gog now turns on him. Sheppard desperately begins using the nozzle of his flame thrower as a bludgeon, trying to smash the robot's electronic tubes. The now-crippled robot begins spinning back and forth, its arms thrashing about wildly. At that point, Gog suddenly comes to a halt, its metal arms falling limply to its sides. American F-86 and F-94 jet fighters have found and destroyed the enemy plane, ending NOVAC's reign of destruction. Van Ness then realizes that Sheppard and Merritt have been exposed to an overdose of radiation from the reactor. Sheppard takes Merritt (who has fainted as a result of all the stress she has experienced) into his arms and they head for the complex hospital, where it is determined that their exposure, while causing their film badges to turn red, was not serious, and that they will both soon recover.

A few days later, Dr. Van Ness explains the situation to the Secretary of Defense, informing him that, in spite of all the setbacks, the project is still on schedule, and that a working model of the space station is about to be launched into orbit. The new "baby space station" will be equipped with telescopes and television cameras that will spot any further attempts to sabotage the complex. The Secretary notes with satisfaction: "Nothing will take us by surprise again!" The following morning, the launch goes off without a hitch.

== Cast ==
- Richard Egan as David Sheppard, OSI Investigator
- Constance Dowling as Joanna Merritt, previously placed OSI Investigator
- Herbert Marshall as Dr. Van Ness, Site Director
- John Wengraf as Dr. Zeitman, NOVAC designer, creator
- Stephen Roberts as Maj. Howard, Site Security Chief
- Marian Richman as Technician Helen
- Phillip Van Zandt as Dr. Pierre Elzevir
- Valerie Vernon as Madame Elzevir
- Byron Kane as Dr. Carter
- David Alpert as Dr. Peter Burden
- Michael Fox as Dr. Hubertus, sub-zero Bio-experimentalist
- William Schallert as Dr. Engle, assistant operator of NOVAC
- Aline Towne as Dr. Kirby
- Jean Dean as Marna Roberts, Chemistry Lab assistant
- Al Bayer as Helicopter Pilot
- Tom Daly as Secretary
- Andy Andrews as Security Guard Andy
- Julian Ludwig as Security Guard Julie

== Crew ==
- Joel F. Moss, Jack Goodrich as Sound men
- Clifford Shank - Color consultant
- William Ferrari - Art Director
- Harry Redmond Jr. - Special effects
- Harry Sukman - Music

== Production ==
Gog was filmed on just two sets at Hal Roach Studios, with the exteriors shot at the former military outpost George Air Force Base, near Victorville, California; it was shot in 15 days. Gog's final cost was estimated to be $250,000.

Shortly after the filming of Gog was completed, Constance Dowling married Ivan Tors and retired from acting. Another actor in the film, William Schallert, made his debut in the science fiction genre with this low budget feature; he later appeared in other film genres, ranging from comedies to dramas and back again to science fiction. He also appeared in TV episodes, including the popular Patty Duke series.

Although shot in the 3D process, Gog was released at the tail end of the first 3D fad (1953–1954). As a result, it was often projected "flat" in its aspect ratio of 1.66:1, made standard by Hollywood the year before, despite prints being available in the stereoscopic format.

== Reception ==
The film was previewed in 3D for the press at a United Artists' screening room. Initial critical response to the film ranged from "good" to "very good".

Critical response was generally positive, with many critics noting the story's basis in science fact, rather than science fiction; this was a staple of Tors' science fiction films. His 1955 television series Science Fiction Theatre had the same period verisimilitude, and often lifted props and some situations from Gog and the other two OSI films.

Motion Picture Herald’s William R. Weaver said of Gog, "The production moves steadily forward, keeping interest growing at a steady pace, and exciting the imagination without overstraining credulity".

== Home media ==
Gog was released by Kino International on Region A Blu-ray in 3D and contains audio commentary by Tom Weaver, Bob Furmanek, and David Schecter.
