= Mike King (transportation executive) =

Kansas Secretary of Transportation
- In office April 2, 2012 – July 15, 2016
- Governor: Sam Brownback
- Preceded by: Barb Rankin (acting)
- Succeeded by: Richard Carlson

Member of the Kansas House of Representatives from the 74th district
- Incumbent
- Assumed office January 13, 2025
- Preceded by: Stephen Owens

Personal details
- Born: Hesston, Kansas
- Party: Republican
- Spouse: Peggy King
- Children: 4
- Education: John Brown University
- Occupation: Businessman

Mike King is an American politician and businessman who served as Kansas Secretary of Transportation from 2012 to 2016, and has served as a Republican member of the Kansas House of Representatives since 2025, representing the 74th district.

Originally from Hesston, Kansas, King owned King Enterprise Group, a central Kansas construction company, for more than 20 years. He sold the company in 2012 after being named Secretary of Transportation. Secretary King earned a degree in building construction from John Brown University in 1981.

King led the Kansas Department of Transportation and its 2,400 employees after being named Secretary of Transportation by Governor Sam Brownback in March 2012, officially taking office on April 2, 2012. His duties expanded in July 2013 when he also became the Director of the Kansas Turnpike Authority (KTA).

Safety and support of economic development initiatives were his priorities during his tenure as secretary. As a member of the Governor's Growth Team, the secretary worked closely with other state agencies to help Kansas seize economic opportunities.

As KTA Director, Secretary King's goals were to grow ridership, improve customer service and facilitate regional electronic tolling interoperability.

In August 2014, Secretary King was elected to a one-year term as president of the Mid America Association of State Transportation Officials (MAASTO). As head of the 10-state consortium, Secretary King focused on the seamless, state-to-state movement of freight in the region.

King left office on July 15, 2016 and was succeeded by Interim Secretary Richard Carlson, a former Kansas State Representative.

He and his wife, Peggy, have four children.

Political offices
Preceded by Barb Rankin (acting)	Kansas Secretary of Transportation; 2012–2016	Succeeded by Richard Carlson
