= Riders to the Stars =

1954 film by Richard Carlson, Herbert L. Strock

- Theatrical release poster
- Directed by: Richard Carlson; Herbert L. Strock (uncredited)
- Written by: Curt Siodmak; Ivan Tors (story)
- Produced by: Maxwell Smith (associate producer: Scientific Research); Herbert L. Strock (associate producer); Ivan Tors (producer)
- Starring: William Lundigan; Martha Hyer; Herbert Marshall; Richard Carlson
- Cinematography: Stanley Cortez; Joseph F. Biroc
- Edited by: Herbert L. Strock
- Music by: Harry Sukman
- Production company: Ivan Tors Productions, Inc.
- Distributed by: United Artists
- Release date: January 14, 1954 (U.S. release)
- Running time: 81 minutes
- Country: United States
- Language: English

Riders to the Stars is a 1954 independently made American science fiction film produced by Ivan Tors Productions and released by United Artists. The film was directed by Richard Carlson (who also stars) and Herbert L. Strock (uncredited) and also stars William Lundigan, Martha Hyer, and Herbert Marshall.

Riders to the Stars is the second film in Ivan Tors' "Office of Scientific Investigation" (OSI) trilogy, which was preceded by The Magnetic Monster (1953) and followed by Gog (1954).

== Plot ==
A group of highly qualified single men, including Dr. Richard Stanton and Dr. Jerry Lockwood, are recruited for a top secret project. They undergo a series of rigorous physical and psychological tests, during which Stanton becomes attracted to the beautiful Dr. Jane Flynn, one of the scientists testing the candidates. After most of the candidates have been eliminated from consideration, the four remaining are told about the purpose of the project.

Stanton's father, Dr. Donald Stanton, is the man in charge. He and his colleagues are working on crewed space travel. They have found, however, that even the best quality metal alloys available eventually turn brittle due to cosmic ray bombardment in outer space. Since metal-based meteors are not subject to these metal fatigue stresses, the scientists want to recover samples before they enter the Earth's atmosphere to discover how the meteors' "outer shell" protects them. To accomplish this, they need to send men into space, something that has never been done before. Stanton, Lockwood, and Walter Gordon accept the dangerous assignment, while the fourth candidate quits.

Three one-man rockets are launched a couple of hundred miles into space in order to intercept an incoming meteor swarm. Gordon makes the first run to capture a meteor; it turns out to be too large for his spaceship's nose scoop, and the ship is destroyed in the collision that follows. Lockwood suffers a mental breakdown when his view screen shows Gordon's still space-suited but now skeletal and weightless body floating toward him. Panicked and delusional, he fires his rocket engines and blasts away from Earth, heading into deep space to his doom. Stanton then misses the main swarm, but a stray meteor crosses his orbital path. He decides to pursue it, despite a warning from ground control that he may use too much fuel in the attempt and burn up upon re-entry. Stanton snags the meteor in time and manages to survive a crash landing with the now captured meteor safely intact. He is rewarded for his heroism with a kiss from Dr. Flynn.

When the meteor is examined, it is discovered to have an outer coating of crystalline pure carbon. With this discovery, the U. S. can now build safer rockets and space stations.

== Cast ==
- William Lundigan as Dr. Richard Donald Stanton
- Herbert Marshall as Dr. Donald L. Stanton / Narrator
- Richard Carlson as Dr. Jerome "Jerry" Lockwood
- Martha Hyer as Dr. Jane Flynn
- Dawn Addams as Susan Manners
- Robert Karnes as Walter J. Gordon
- Lawrence Dobkin as Dr. Delmar
- George Eldredge as Dr. Paul Drayden
- Dan Riss as Dr. Frank Warner
- Michael Fox as Dr. Klinger (Psychiatrist)
- King Donovan as James F. O'Herli, Security
- Kem Dibbs as David Wells
- James Best as Sidney K. Fuller

== Production ==
Riders to the Stars was Richard Carlson's first film as both director and star. In order to create a more authentic feel for the story, contemporary newsreel footage was used of United States' launches of German V-2 rockets captured by the United States Army at the end of World War II in Europe. (Note: The WAC Corporal was a sounding stratospheric rocket that flew as a second stage on a similar rocket booster developed from the German wartime V-2 rocket.) Additionally, one authentic sequence shows "two white rats in a rocket beyond the force of gravity ... one of the most startling series of photographs ever made".

Five years later, actor William Lundigan would go on to star in the syndicated space science fiction television series Men Into Space (1959), which could be considered a sequel to or at least a continuation of the ideas explored in Riders to the Stars.

Riders to the Stars was filmed and released theatrically in SuperCinecolor provided by Color Corporation of America, but prints struck for television syndication were in black-and-white. Turner Classic Movies airs the color version.

== Reception ==
The New York Times was critical of Riders to the Stars, calling it lackluster and gimmicky. "Spliced in to give all the idiotic, pseudo-scientific mumbo-jumbo a precarious footing in fact are newsreel shots ..." Later reviews, however, noted that the filmmakers had created a "near-documentary" by using rocket footage and scientific equipment as a precursor to the coming space age, all within an "unremarkable film".
