= West Point Widow =

1941 film by Robert Siodmak

- Theatrical film poster
- Directed by: Robert Siodmak
- Written by: F. Hugh Herbert; Hanns Kräly; Anne Wormser
- Produced by: Colbert Clark; Sol C. Siegel
- Starring: Anne Shirley; Richard Carlson; Richard Denning
- Cinematography: Theodor Sparkuhl
- Edited by: Archie Marshek
- Music by: John Leipold; Leo Shuken
- Production company: Paramount Pictures
- Distributed by: Paramount Pictures
- Release date: June 20, 1941
- Running time: 63 minutes
- Country: United States
- Language: English

West Point Widow is a 1941 American comedy film directed by Robert Siodmak and starring Anne Shirley, Richard Carlson and Richard Denning. It was produced and distributed by Paramount Pictures.

== Synopsis ==
Nancy Hull, a nurse, turns down marriage proposals from two doctors for the love of a football star.

== Cast ==
- Anne Shirley as Nancy Hull
- Richard Carlson as Dr. Jimmy Krueger
- Richard Denning as Lt. Rhody Graves
- Frances Gifford as Daphne
- Maude Eburne as Mrs. Willits
- Janet Beecher as Mrs. Graves
- Archie Twitchell as Joe Martin
- Lillian Randolph as Sophie
- Cecil Kellaway as Dr. Spencer
- Patricia Farr as Miss Hinkle
- Sharon Lynn as Jennifer as a baby
- Jean Hall as Jennifer
- Eddie Conrad as Mr. Metapoulos

== Bibliography ==
- Fetrow, Alan G. Feature Films, 1940-1949: a United States Filmography. McFarland, 1994.
