= The Great Sinner =

1949 film by Robert Siodmak

- Theatrical poster
- Directed by: Robert Siodmak
- Screenplay by: Christopher Isherwood; Ladislaus Fodor; René Fülöp-Miller
- Based on: The Gambler; 1866 novel by Fyodor Dostoyevsky
- Produced by: Gottfried Reinhardt
- Starring: Gregory Peck; Ava Gardner; Melvyn Douglas
- Cinematography: George J. Folsey
- Edited by: Harold F. Kress
- Music by: Bronisław Kaper
- Production company: Metro-Goldwyn-Mayer
- Distributed by: Loew's Inc.
- Release date: June 29, 1949
- Running time: 110 minutes
- Country: United States
- Language: English
- Budget: $2,075,000
- Box office: $2,041,000

The Great Sinner is a 1949 American film noir drama film directed by Robert Siodmak. Based on the 1866 short novel The Gambler written by Fyodor Dostoyevsky, the film stars Gregory Peck, Ava Gardner, Frank Morgan, Ethel Barrymore, Walter Huston, Agnes Moorehead and Melvyn Douglas.

== Plot ==
The film opens in the 1860s in a run-down attic room in Wiesbaden, with a man (whose name we soon learn is Fedya) lying on a bed in the foreground. A violent storm knocks open the windows, sending the pages of a manuscript flying around the room. A woman (later revealed to be Pauline Ostrovsky, a reformed gambling addict), enters and shuts the windows, looking tenderly at Fedya. Picking up the pages of the manuscript, she realizes that they are a memoir that Fedya has been writing. The main narrative follows as an extended flashback, sometimes with voiceover narration by Fedya.

While traveling by train from Moscow to Paris, Fedya, a writer, meets Pauline, who passes the time playing solitaire. Attracted to her, he decides to disembark with her at Wiesbaden and follows her to a casino. There, he finds that Pauline is a gambling addict like her father General Ostrovsky, who is also at the casino. Upon seeing how undisturbed the Ostrovskys are to find out the General's wealthy mother is dying, he becomes interested in the effects of gambling. He decides to stay in Wiesbaden to do a character study of gambling addicts.

One of them is Aristide Pitard, an old thief and gambler who claims Fedya's winnings. Taking pity on the man, Fedya offers Aristide money to leave the city. Instead, Aristide returns to the casino using the money to gamble and, after losing it all, he eventually shoots himself in desperation.

But before dying, he gives Fedya a pawn ticket and asks him to redeem it and return the pawned article to its owner, but dies before revealing the owner. When Fedya goes to the pawnshop he discovers that the pledged item is a religious medal, and later finds out that it belongs to Pauline.

Meanwhile, he has fallen deeply in love with her, despite her father's discouragement of a romantic involvement with her.

After returning the medal, Fedya finds out Pauline is pledged to an arranged marriage with Armand de Glasse, the wealthy but ruthless owner of the casino. Aware that Pauline is not engaged to Armand out of love, but as a payment for her father's debts to the casino, Fedya decides to start gambling himself to earn enough money to pay off the General's debt.

He goes on a winning streak and wins a lot at roulette and becomes a gambling addict himself. The money was to be used to pay the General's debt of 200,000 to Armand.

However, after a short period of fame for his unlikely roulette winning streak, his luck runs out and after Armand de Glasse won't redeem the General's marker until the banks reopen the next day. He then decides to take the winnings to deposit in the hotel safe but gets distracted by seeing his "lucky numbers" everywhere. Naturally he loses most of the money intended to pay Pauline's father's casino debt.

Turning up at Armand's private Baccarat game, Fedya quickly loses what remains after his roulette losses and, in a delirium to recoup his losses, borrows money from Armand to continue gambling at Baccarat.

But he loses it all, including all his future earnings used as collateral for more borrowing from ruthless Armand; only too happy to take everything he has.

After this, he desperately seeks to pawn his few remaining possessions. Losing even that, when he is completely broke, Fedya has a vision in which an apparition of Aristide appears and hands him a gun to shoot himself. Pauline appears and still delirious, he grabs Pauline's religious medal and attempts to sell it back to the pawnbroker, Emma Getzel. She refuses to buy it claiming it's worthless. However, in a now blind insanity, he almost kills her before losing consciousness in one of his unexplained dizzy spells.

In the meantime, Pauline's previously near death grandmother shows up. The general gets her interested in baccarat and she plays at the casino and loses presumably her entire fortune of 8M DM before dying at the table.

In the end, Fedya completes his book manuscript on gambling obsession. After, he turns to Pauline, who forgives him for his behavior.

== Cast ==
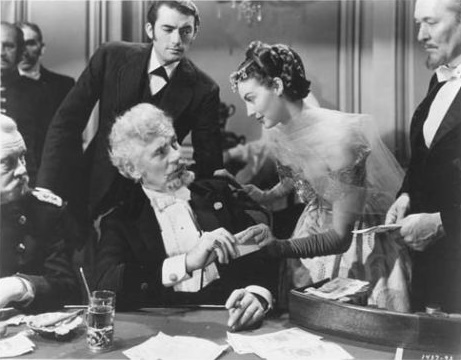
The Great Sinner (1949), still photo

- Gregory Peck as Fedya (diminutive of Fyodor)
- Ava Gardner as Pauline Ostrovsky
- Melvyn Douglas as Armand de Glasse
- Walter Huston as General Ostrovsky
- Ethel Barrymore as Grandmother Ostrovsky
- Frank Morgan as Aristide Pitard
- Agnes Moorehead as Emma Getzel
- Friedrich von Ledebur as Casino Secretary
- Ludwig Donath as Doctor
- Curt Bois as Jeweler/Money Lender
- Ludwig Stössel as Hotel Manager
- Ernö Verebes as Hotel Valet
- Chet Brandenburg as Hotel Valet (uncredited)
- Spencer Chan as Gambler (uncredited)
- Fred Aldrich as Casino Patron (uncredited)
- Larry Steers as Casino Patron (uncredited)
- Joe Ploski as Hotel Valet (uncredited)
- Charles Wagenheim as Gambler with Ring (uncredited)

== Production ==
The working title for the film was The Gamblers. Warner Bros. planned on making a screen adaptation of Fyodor Dostoyevsky's novel in 1940, directed by William Dieterle and starring Albert Basserman. Eventually, MGM bought the rights to the short novel, and for its adaptation, the screenwriters also used elements of Dostoyevsky's life and his other novel Crime and Punishment.

In April 1948, Gregory Peck was cast in the lead role. At the time it was announced, it was revealed Deborah Kerr was scheduled to star opposite him. However, in late May 1948, Lana Turner was cast as Peck's leading lady, with production set to start in September the same year. However, a week later, in June, it was revealed that Ava Gardner was cast in the female lead. Turner withdrew from the film due to an extended honeymoon in Europe, which prevented her from being in Hollywood in time for the commencement of filming. The film was Peck and Gardner's first of three collaborations.

The role played by Melvyn Douglas was initially offered to Kirk Douglas.

In late June 1948, Robert Siodmak signed on to direct. Initially, Siodmak had been unavailable to direct the film due to commitments to an ultimately unrealized project starring Joan Fontaine, but Fontaine's withdrawal due to pregnancy allowed Siodmak to direct The Great Sinner.

The film went into production as a 'prestige film' and Peck later recalled that Siodmak was a "nervous wreck" as a result of the responsibility he felt. Walter Huston did not sign on for the film, which was to be his penultimate role, until production had already started in September 1948. André Previn received an early onscreen credit as conductor of Bronisław Kaper's score and the period bandstand music.

Siodmak said he had been presented with "an enormous script" which he wanted to cut "but no one took any notice so I went ahead and filmed it." He says it came in at three hours after much cutting "but it was still too long, terribly slow (Gregory Peck, a slow talker, seemed so impressed by the idea of acting in Dostoevsky that he played at about a third of even his usual speed), heavy and dull with the disadvantage that now the story didn't even make sense." The film was cut down to two hours and ten minutes. MGM wanted the film reshot with "a new and stronger love story". Siodmak refused so the studio got Mervyn Le Roy to do it. He said "When I eventually saw the finished film I don't believe that a single scene was left as I had made it."

== Reception ==
Despite the first-class production values, The Great Sinner flopped at the box office. According to MGM records the film earned $1,179,000 in the US and Canada and $862,000 overseas resulting in a loss of $821,000.

In a New York Herald Tribune review, the film was called "pompous and dull entertainment." Time magazine added "the rich, exuberant flow of dialogue, incident, and atmosphere characteristic of the Russian master has been choked to a pedestrian trickle. Dostoevsky's brilliant insights into the tortured motives and emotions of his lovers have paled into klieg-lighted stereotypes."

TimeOut says "the script unceremoniously culls episodes and characters from Dostoevsky's youth...Unfortunately, this prestigious MGM production is heavy-going and overdone."

Screenwriter Christopher Isherwood, who adapted the novel, admitted to the failure, saying: "It should have been much better than it was....but apart from a few good scenes, it was neither Dostoevsky's story, nor the story of Dostoevsky."
