= Becky Hutchins =

American politician (born 1949)

Member of the Kansas House of Representatives from the 61st district
- In office January 12, 2015 – January 9, 2017
- Preceded by: Richard Carlson
- Succeeded by: Francis Awerkamp

Member of the Kansas House of Representatives from the 50th district
- In office January 9, 1995 – January 8, 2007
- Preceded by: Marvin E. Smith
- Succeeded by: Rocky Fund

Personal details
- Born: September 3, 1949 (age 76) Holton, Kansas, U.S.
- Party: Republican
- Spouse: Joel Hutchins
- Children: 2

Becky Jane Hutchins (born September 3, 1949) is an American politician. She has served as a Republican member for the 61st district in the Kansas House of Representatives since 2015. She was given an evaluation of 60% by the American Conservative Union in 2015 and an evaluation of 92% in 2016, for a lifetime evaluation of 76%. She previously served in the House from 1994 to 2006.
