= Richard Carlson (politician) =

American politician

Kansas Secretary of Transportation
- In office July 18, 2016 – January 13, 2019
- Governor: Sam Brownback; Jeff Colyer
- Preceded by: Mike King
- Succeeded by: Julie Lorenz

Member of the Kansas House of Representatives from the 61st district
- In office January 10, 2005 – January 12, 2015
- Preceded by: Verlyn Osborne
- Succeeded by: Becky Hutchins

Personal details
- Born: June 17, 1944 (age 82)
- Party: Republican
- Spouse: Cheryl
- Education: Kansas State University

For other people named Richard Carlson, see Richard Carlson (disambiguation).

Richard Carlson (born June 17, 1944) is a former Kansas Secretary of Transportation, a position in which he served from 2016 to 2019. Previously, between 2005 and 2015, he was a Republican member of the Kansas House of Representatives, representing the 61st district. He was given a 100% evaluation by the American Conservative Union.

== Early life and career ==
Carlson is a native of St. Marys, Kansas. He studied business and economics at Kansas State University and later served in the Kansas Army National Guard. Before Carlson was elected to the legislature, he served as the Pottawatomie County Commissioner between 1993 and 2005. He also served on the board of the Flint Hills Regional Leadership Program.

After leaving the legislature, Carlson worked as a legislative liaison and tax policy advisor for the Kansas Department of Revenue.

== Kansas House of Representatives ==
=== Committee assignments ===
==== 2013-14 session ====
- Taxation (Chairman)
- Appropriations
- Commerce, Labor and Economic Development

==== 2011-12 session ====
- Taxation (Chairman)
- Appropriations
- Federal and State Affairs
- Pensions, Investments and Benefits

==== 2009-10 session ====
- Taxation (Chairman)
- Education Budget
- Federal and State Affairs
- Pensions, Investments and Benefits
- Select Committee on KPERS

== Kansas Secretary of Transportation ==
After Mike King resigned to pursue a career in the private sector, Governor Sam Brownback appointed Carlson to serve as interim Kansas Secretary of Transportation on July 18, 2016. On October 24, 2016, Brownback announced that he would nominate Carlson for the official cabinet role. He was confirmed for the position by the Kansas State Senate in July 2017.

Political offices
Preceded by Mike King	Kansas Secretary of Transportation; July 18, 2016–January 13, 2019	Succeeded by Julie Lorenz
