= Fly-by-Night (film) =

1942 film by Robert Siodmak

- Theatrical release poster
- Directed by: Robert Siodmak
- Written by: Jay Dratler; F. Hugh Herbert
- Story by: Ben Roberts; Sidney Sheldon
- Produced by: Sol C. Siegel; Colbert Clark
- Starring: Richard Carlson; Nancy Kelly
- Cinematography: John F. Seitz
- Edited by: Arthur P. Schmidt
- Distributed by: Paramount Pictures
- Release date: January 19, 1942
- Running time: 74 minutes
- Country: United States
- Language: English

Fly-by-Night (also known under the alternative title Secrets of G32) is a 1942 American thriller/screwball comedy film directed by Robert Siodmak, starring Richard Carlson and Nancy Kelly. It was Siodmak's second American film.

== Plot ==
A young doctor tracks down a Nazi spy ring in an effort to clear his name after being charged with the murder of a scientist.

== Cast ==
- Richard Carlson as Dr. Geoffrey Burton
- Nancy Kelly as Pat Lindsey
- Albert Bassermann as Dr. Storm
- Miles Mander as Professor Langner
- Edward Gargan as Officer Charlie Prescott
- Adrian Morris as Officer John Prescott
- Martin Kosleck as George Taylor
- Walter Kingsford as Heydt
- Cy Kendall as Dahlig
- Nestor Paiva as Grube
- Oscar O'Shea as Pa Prescott
- Mary Gordon as Ma Prescott
- Arthur Loft as Inspector Karns
- Marion Martin as Blond nurse
- Clem Bevans as Train station watchman
