= My Heart Belongs to Daddy (film) =

1942 American film by Robert Siodmak

- Theatrical poster
- Directed by: Robert Siodmak
- Written by: F. Hugh Herbert
- Produced by: Sol C. Siegel
- Starring: Richard Carlson; Martha O'Driscoll; Cecil Kellaway
- Cinematography: Daniel L. Fapp
- Edited by: Alma Macrorie
- Music by: Leo Shuken; Victor Young
- Production company: Paramount Pictures
- Distributed by: Paramount Pictures
- Release date: November 7, 1942
- Running time: 75 minutes
- Country: United States
- Language: English

My Heart Belongs to Daddy is a 1942 American comedy film directed by Robert Siodmak and starring Richard Carlson, Martha O'Driscoll and Cecil Kellaway.

== Plot ==
Cecil Kellaway is driving Martha O'Driscoll to the hospital to have her baby. The taxi gets caught in a snowdrift and they take shelter in the home of widowed Nobel Prize laureate (Physics) Richard Carlson. The physician says she can't be moved, so there she rests, much to the anger of two sets of in-laws: her snobby in-laws who want the baby taken from his ex-bubble-dancer mother; and his in-laws, Florence and her daughter, Frances Gifford, whom they have been scheming since the funeral to marry Carlson.

== Cast ==
- Richard Carlson as Prof. Richard Inglethorpe Culbertson Kay, aka R.I.C. Kay, aka Rick
- Martha O'Driscoll as Joyce Whitman
- Cecil Kellaway as Alfred Fortescue
- Frances Gifford as Grace Saunders
- Florence Bates as Mrs. Saunders
- Mabel Paige as nurse Eckles
- Velma Berg as Babs Saunders
- Francis Pierlot as Dr. Mitchell
- Ray Walker as Eddie Summers - band leader
- Fern Emmett as Josephine - the Maid
- Milton Kibbee as chauffeur
- Betty Farrington as cook
