= Richard Carlson (actor) =

American actor, director, and screenwriter (1912–1977)

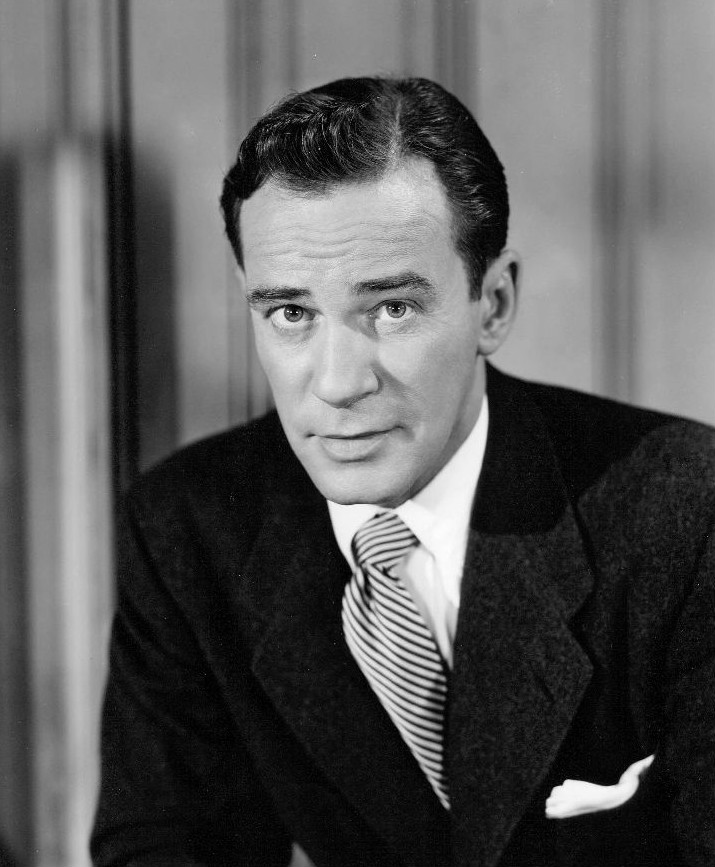
- Carlson in 1952
- Born: Richard Dutoit Carlson; April 29, 1912; Albert Lea, Minnesota, U.S.
- Died: November 25, 1977 (aged 65); Encino, Los Angeles, California, U.S.
- Resting place: Los Angeles National Cemetery
- Education: University of Minnesota
- Occupations: Actor; director; screenwriter
- Years active: 1935–1975
- Spouse: Mona Carlson (m. 1939)
- Children: 2

Richard Dutoit Carlson (April 29, 1912 – November 25, 1977) was an American actor, television and film director, and screenwriter. He is best remembered for his leading roles in the sci-fi classic It Came from Outer Space (1953) and the iconic Universal Monster film Creature from the Black Lagoon (1954).

== Early life and education ==
Carlson was the son of a Danish-born lawyer who lived in Albert Lea, Minnesota. He majored in drama at the University of Minnesota, where he wrote and directed plays and was a member of the society Phi Beta Kappa. He graduated cum laude with a Master of Arts degree, a scholarship prize of $2500, and an invitation to join the faculty. He declined the job offer, fearing it would create a dull future, but used the $2500 to open his own repertory theater in Saint Paul, Minnesota. He wrote, produced, directed, and acted in three plays—which used up the $2500. When the theater failed, Carlson relocated to California to join the Pasadena Playhouse, and then to New York for the Broadway stage.

== Career ==
In 1935, Carlson made his acting debut on Broadway in the play Three Men on a Horse. A talent scout for Metro-Goldwyn-Mayer spotted him, and he was signed to a movie contract. He appeared in only one film, Desert Death (1935), a "Crime Does Not Pay" short subject in which Carlson, uncredited, appeared as the film's announcer, "the MGM crime reporter". After this assignment, Carlson walked away from his movie contract. MGM required its younger players to take an extensive, time-consuming training course, described by Carlson's fellow MGM rookie Pinky Tomlin as "star school... 25 hours a day, eight days a week"; Tomlin declined the regimen and the contract to pursue his musical career, and it is likely that Richard Carlson also dropped out to continue his dramatic career. He returned to the stage, taking a role in a Chicago production of Night of January 16. (Carlson's brief stay at MGM is omitted from the studio biography published in 1944; the story cites Carlson's screen debut as 1938.)

He was featured in Brock Pemberton's play Now You've Done It (1937) and appeared with Ethel Barrymore in Ghost of Yankee Doodle (1937–38). In 1938 he wrote and staged the play Western Waters starring Van Heflin, which played for only seven performances. He then rejoined Ethel Barrymore for Whiteoaks (1938).

=== Return to motion pictures ===
Carlson was signed by David O. Selznick for The Young in Heart (1938), Carlson's first feature film. He had a supporting role in The Duke of West Point (1938) then was second billed to Ann Sheridan in Winter Carnival (1939). He returned to Broadway for Stars In Your Eyes (1939). Metro-Goldwyn-Mayer cast him in two movies with Lana Turner (These Glamour Girls and Dancing Co-Ed, both released in 1939).

Carlson was the main male actor for such movies as Little Accident (1939), Beyond Tomorrow (1940), The Ghost Breakers (1940), The Howards of Virginia (1940), Too Many Girls (1940), No, No, Nanette (1941), Back Street (1941), West Point Widow (1941), The Little Foxes (1941), Secrets of G32 (1942), The Affairs of Martha (1942), Highways by Night (1942), and My Heart Belongs to Daddy (1942).

=== Metro-Goldwyn-Mayer ===
Carlson played in several movies for MGM in the early 1940s, including White Cargo (1942), Presenting Lily Mars (1943), A Stranger in Town (1943), Young Ideas (1943), and The Man from Down Under (1943).

During World War II, Carlson served in the United States Navy, as a lieutenant, junior grade.

=== Post-war ===
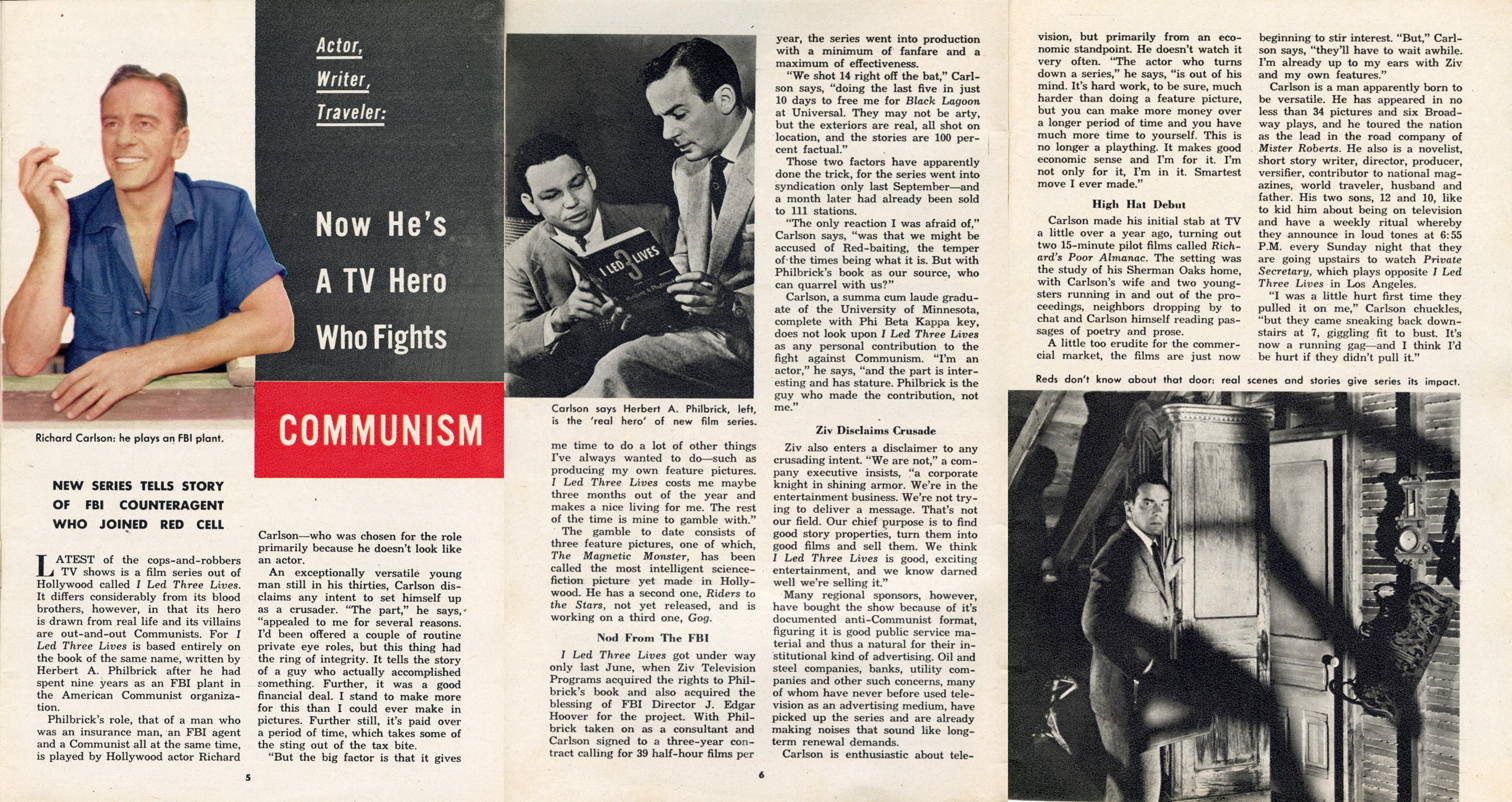
Carlson in TV Guide, December 4, 1953

When he returned to Hollywood, he had few offers of employment, and began writing to supplement his income. He gained supporting roles in the movies So Well Remembered (1947) and The Amazing Mr. X (1948) and the lead in Behind Locked Doors (1948). In 1950, he co-featured with Deborah Kerr and Stewart Granger in the very successful adventure movie King Solomon's Mines, filmed on location in the Kenya Colony and the Belgian Congo. While filming in Africa, Carlson wrote a series of articles for The Saturday Evening Post, collectively titled "Diary of a Hollywood Safari."

Despite the movie's success, Carlson remained a supporting actor: The Sound of Fury (1950), Valentino (1951), A Millionaire for Christy (1951), and The Blue Veil (1951). He was also featured in Whispering Smith Hits London (1952), Retreat, Hell! (1952), The Rose Bowl Story (1952), Eagles of the Fleet (1952), and Seminole (1953).

On July 14, 1951, Carlson and then U.S. Senator Hubert Humphrey were the guests on the CBS live variety television show Faye Emerson's Wonderful Town, in which hostess Faye Emerson visited Minneapolis to accent the kinds of music popular in the city.

Carlson began to appear regularly on television shows such as The Ford Theatre Hour, Cameo Theatre, Lights Out, Celanese Theatre, Robert Montgomery Presents, Hollywood Opening Night, and The Ford Television Theatre. Carlson wrote episodes of Schlitz Playhouse and Kraft Theatre. From 1953 to 1956, he featured in the television series I Led 3 Lives.

=== Science fiction ===
Carlson played the lead in The Magnetic Monster (1953) which caused him to become popular in the newly re-emergent genres of science fiction and horror.

He followed it with leads in The Maze (1953), It Came from Outer Space (1953) with Barbara Rush, and Creature from the Black Lagoon (1954) with Julie Adams. He also had the male lead for All I Desire (1953). He also featured in the 1954 movie Riders to the Stars.

He starred in the educational science film The Strange Case of the Cosmic Rays, directed by Frank Capra for the acclaimed Bell Telephone Series in 1957.

Carlson remained active in television, appearing in General Electric Theatre, Matinee Theatre, Kraft Theatre, Lux Video Theatre, Climax!, Studio One in Hollywood, Schlitz Playhouse, and The Best of Broadway.

=== Director ===
Carlson's success in the genre resulted in him acting in and directing the 1954 science-fiction movie Riders to the Stars. He then directed Four Guns to the Border (1954). His third feature as director was Appointment with a Shadow (1957), followed by The Saga of Hemp Brown (1958). He wrote the script for Johnny Rocco (1958).

Throughout the 1950s Richard Carlson pursued both acting in and directing motion pictures: The Last Command (1955), Bengazi (1955). and The Helen Morgan Story (1957). In 1957 and 1958, Carlson played "Mr. Fiction Writer" in three of the nine educational features made for television collectively titled The Bell Laboratory Science Series. He also directed his final movie for the project, The Unchained Goddess.

In 1957 he was cast as two different clergymen, Rabbi Avraham Soltes and Father William Wendt, in the episodes "The Happy Gift" and "Call For Help", respectively, of the syndicated religious anthology series, Crossroads.

=== Mackenzie's Raiders ===
In 1959, Carlson was cast as Paul Drake in "The Faithless" of the NBC western television series Riverboat, with Darren McGavin. In the story line, Drake is an escaped prisoner with medical training being transported on the river vessel, the Enterprise, back to jail. Having lost his religious faith, Drake refuses to render medical assistance to a two-year-old girl stricken with a communicable disease which threatens the entire vessel. William Phipps and Jeanne Bates play the parents of the child. Bethel Leslie portrays Cathy Norris.

Carlson began directing for television: The Man and the Challenge (which he also wrote for), This Man Dawson, Men Into Space, Alcoa Premiere, and The Detectives.

His early 1960s credits as actor included The Chevy Mystery Show (in the first television story to feature Lt. Columbo), Tormented, The Aquanauts (which he also directed), The Loretta Young Show (which he also directed), Bus Stop, Thriller (which he also directed), Going My Way, Arrest and Trial, The Fugitive, Wagon Train, The Christophers, and Burke's Law. He wrote episodes of Daktari and the movie Island of the Lost (1967).

In 1965, he played a mad scientist who creates a mutant, killer octopus in the Voyage to the Bottom of the Sea episode "The Village of Guilt".

He played in the movies Della (1965) and Kid Rodelo (1965), directing the latter. He acted in the series The Virginian, Bonanza and Rawhide.

In the final two seasons of CBS's Perry Mason, Carlson made two guest appearances, both times as the murder victim. In 1964 he played Anthony Fry in "The Case of the Tragic Trophy;" in 1966, he played Clete Hawley in "The Case of the Avenging Angel."

=== Later work ===
Carlson played in the movies The Doomsday Flight (1966), The Power (1968), and The Valley of Gwangi (1968). Carlson's last movie role was in the 1969 Elvis Presley/Mary Tyler Moore movie, Change of Habit.

Carlson played in episodes of The FBI, Lancer, Cannon, Owen Marshall, Counselor at Law, and Mobile One. His final role was in a 1975 episode of the television series Khan!. Carlson wrote for O'Hara, U.S. Treasury, Owen Marshall, Counselor at Law and Mannix.

== Personal life and death ==
Carlson married Mona Carlson in 1939.

He died of a cerebral hemorrhage at the age of 65 on November 25, 1977, in Encino, California. He was buried in Los Angeles National Cemetery in West Los Angeles.

== Legacy ==
Carlson is often mistaken for actor Hugh Marlowe. In spite of a notable resemblance and remarkably similar speaking voice, the two actors were not related. Marlowe and Carlson co-starred in a short subject World War II training film together, For God and Country.

For his contribution to the television industry, Richard Carlson has a star on the Hollywood Walk of Fame at 6333 Hollywood Blvd.

== Filmography ==
Film
| Year | Title | Role | Notes |
|---|---|---|---|
| 1935 | Desert Death | MGM Crime Reporter | (short subject, uncredited) |
| 1938 | The Young in Heart | Duncan Macrae | |
| 1938 | The Duke of West Point | Jack West | |
| 1939 | Winter Carnival | Professor John Welden | |
| 1939 | These Glamour Girls | Joe | |
| 1939 | Dancing Co-Ed | Michael "Pug" Braddock | |
| 1939 | Little Accident | Perry Allerton | |
| 1940 | Beyond Tomorrow | James Houston | |
| 1940 | The Ghost Breakers | Geoff Montgomery | |
| 1940 | The Howards of Virginia | Thomas Jefferson | |
| 1940 | Too Many Girls | Clint Kelly | |
| 1940 | No, No, Nanette | Tom Gillespie | |
| 1941 | Back Street | Curt Stanton | |
| 1941 | West Point Widow | Dr. Jimmy Krueger | |
| 1941 | Hold That Ghost | Dr. Duncan "Doc" Jackson | Working title: Oh Charlie |
| 1941 | The Little Foxes | David Hewitt | |
| 1942 | Fly-by-Night | Dr. Geoffrey Burton | |
| 1942 | The Affairs of Martha | Jeff Sommerfield | |
| 1942 | Highways by Night | Tommy Van Steel | |
| 1942 | My Heart Belongs to Daddy | Prof. Richard Inglethorpe Culbertson Kay | |
| 1942 | White Cargo | Mr. Langford | |
| 1943 | Presenting Lily Mars | Owen Vail | |
| 1943 | A Stranger in Town | Bill Adams | |
| 1943 | Young Ideas | Tom Farrell | |
| 1943 | The Man from Down Under | "Nipper" Wilson | |
| 1947 | So Well Remembered | Charles Winslow | |
| 1948 | The Amazing Mr. X | Martin Abbott | |
| 1948 | Behind Locked Doors | Ross Stewart | |
| 1950 | King Solomon's Mines | John Goode | |
| 1950 | The Sound of Fury | Gil Stanton | Alternative title: Try and Get Me |
| 1951 | Valentino | Bill King | |
| 1951 | A Millionaire for Christy | Dr. Roland Cook | |
| 1951 | The Blue Veil | Gerald Kean | |
| 1952 | Whispering Smith Hits London | Whispering Smith | |
| 1952 | Retreat, Hell! | Captain Paul Hansen | |
| 1952 | The Rose Bowl Story | Narrator | Voice, Uncredited |
| 1952 | Flat Top | Lt. Rodgers | |
| 1953 | The Magnetic Monster | Dr. Jeffrey Stewart | |
| 1953 | Seminole | Major Harlan Degan | |
| 1953 | It Came from Outer Space | John Putnam | |
| 1953 | The Maze | Gerald MacTeam | |
| 1953 | All I Desire | Henry Murdoch | |
| 1953 | The Golden Blade | Narrator | Voice, Uncredited |
| 1954 | Riders to the Stars | Dr. Jerome "Jerry" Lockwood | Also directed |
| 1954 | Creature from the Black Lagoon | Dr. David Reed | |
| 1955 | An Annapolis Story | Narrator | Voice, Uncredited |
| 1955 | The Last Command | William B. Travis | Alternative title: San Antonio de Bexar |
| 1955 | Bengazi | Insp. Levering | |
| 1956 | Three for Jamie Dawn | Martin Random | |
| 1957 | The Helen Morgan Story | Russell Wade | |
| 1960 | Tormented | Tom Stewart | |
| 1964 | Della | David Stafford | |
| 1966 | Kid Rodelo | Link | Also director |
| 1966 | The Doomsday Flight | Chief Pilot Bob Shea | TV movie written by Rod Serling |
| 1968 | The Power | Professor Norman E. Van Zandt | |
| 1969 | The Valley of Gwangi | Champ | |
| 1969 | Change of Habit | Bishop Finley | |
Television
| Year | Title | Role | Notes |
| 1953–1956 | I Led Three Lives | Herbert Philbrick | |
| 1954 | General Electric Theater | Archie Hawkins | 1 episode |
| 1954 | The Best of Broadway | Mike Connor | 1 episode |
| 1959 | Riverboat | Paul Drake | 1 episode |
| 1959 | The Man and the Challenge | - | Director, 1 episode |
| 1959 | Men into Space | - | Director, 1 episode |
| 1960 | The Aquanauts | Ross Porter | 1 episode |
| 1961–1962 | The Detectives Starring Robert Taylor | - | Director, 5 episodes |
| 1962 | Bus Stop | George Whaley | 1 episode |
| 1962 | Thriller | Guy Guthrie | 1 episode |
| 1962 | Going My Way | Francis Delaney | 1 episode |
| 1964 | Arrest and Trial | Turner Leigh | 1 episode |
| 1964 | The Fugitive | Allan Pruitt | 1 episode |
| 1964 | The Virginian | Sheriff Marden | Episode "Smile of a Dragon" |
| 1964 | Voyage to the Bottom of the Sea | Lars Mattson | 1 episode |
| 1964, 1966 | Perry Mason | Anthony Fry, Clete Hawley | 2 episodes |
| 1965 | The Virginian | Major Ralph Forrester | Episode "Farewell to Honesty" |
| 1968 | Bonanza | Arch Hollinbeck | 1 episode |
| 1969 | It Takes a Thief | Daniel K. Ryder | 1 episode |
| 1969 | The F.B.I. | Harold David Dewitt | 1 episode |
| 1969 | Lancer | Judah Abbott | 1 episode |
| 1971–1973 | O'Hara, U.S. Treasury | - | Writer, 3 episodes |
| 1972–1973 | Cannon | Owen McMahon; Mr. Archibald | 2 episodes |
| 1973 | Owen Marshall: Counselor at Law | Al Downes | 1 episode |
| 1975 | Khan! | | 1 episode |
