= Academy Award for Best Original Score =

Motion picture award for music

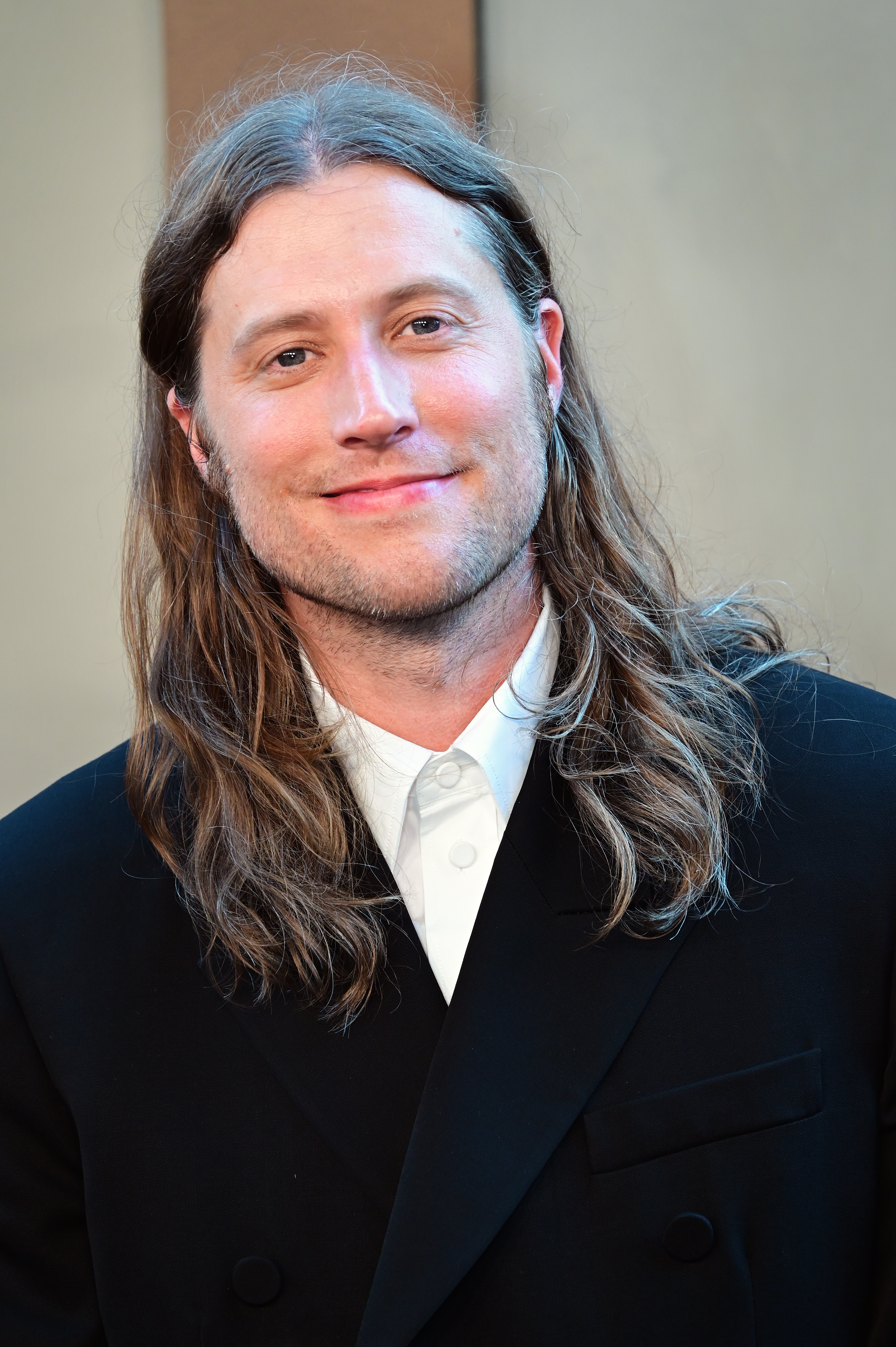
- 2018, 2023, and 2025 recipient: Ludwig Göransson
- Country: United States
- Presented by: Academy of Motion Picture Arts and Sciences
- First award: February 27, 1935; 91 years ago (for films released in 1934)
- Most recent winner: Ludwig Göransson; Sinners (2025)

Highlights
- Most wins: Alfred Newman (9)
- Most nominations: John Williams (49)
- Website: oscars.org

The Academy Award for Best Original Score is an award presented annually by the Academy of Motion Picture Arts and Sciences (AMPAS) to the best substantial body of music in the form of dramatic underscoring written specifically for the film by the submitting composer. Some pre-existing music is allowed, though, but a contending film must include a minimum of original music. This minimum since 2021 is established as 35% of the music, which is raised to 80% for sequels and franchise films. Fifteen scores are shortlisted before nominations are announced.

== History ==
The Academy began awarding movies for their scores in 1935. The category was originally called Best Scoring. At the time, winners and nominees were a mix of original scores and adaptations of pre-existing material. Following the controversial win of Charles Previn for One Hundred Men and a Girl in 1938, a film without a credited composer that featured pre-existing classical music, the Academy added a Best Original Score category in 1939. In 1942, the distinction between the two Scoring categories changed slightly as they were renamed to Best Music Score of a Dramatic Picture and Best Scoring of a Musical Picture. This marked the first time the category was split into separate genres. From 1942 to 1985, musical scores had their own category, with the exception of 1958, 1981, and 1982. During that time, both categories had many name changes:

1. Non-musical scores

- Best Music Score of a Dramatic Picture (1942)
- Best Music Score of a Dramatic or Comedy Picture (1943–1962)
- Best Music Score—substantially original (1963–1966)
- Best Original Music Score (1967–1968)
- Best Original Score—for a motion picture [not a musical] (1969–1970)
- Best Original Score (1971, 1976–1995, 2000–present)
- Best Original Dramatic Score (1972–1975, 1996–1999)

2. Musical scores

- Best Scoring of a Musical Picture (1942–1962)
- Best Scoring of Music—adaptation or treatment (1963–1968)
- Best Score of a Musical Picture—original or adaptation (1969–1970)
- Best Original Song Score (1971)
- Best Scoring: Adaptation and Original Song Score (1972–1973)
- Best Scoring: Original Song Score and Adaptation -or- Scoring: Adaptation (1974–1976)
- Best Original Song Score and Its Adaptation or Adaptation Score (1977–1978)
- Best Adaptation Score (1979)
- Best Original Song Score and Its Adaptation -or- Adaptation Score (1980, 1983)
- Best Original Song Score or Adaptation Score (1984)
- Best Original Song Score (1985)
- Best Original Musical or Comedy Score (1996–1999)

Following the wins of four Walt Disney Feature Animation films in six years from 1990 to 1995 (The Little Mermaid, Beauty and the Beast, Aladdin, and The Lion King) during a period called the Disney Renaissance, it was decided to once again split the Best Original Score category by genres, this time by combining comedies and musicals together. As Alan Bergman, the chairman of the Academy's music branch said, "People were voting for the songs, not the underscores. We felt that Academy members outside the music branch didn't distinguish between the two. So when a score like The Lion King is competing against a drama like Forrest Gump, it's apples and oranges – not in the quality of the score, but in the way it functions in the movie. There's a big difference." The category was therefore split into Best Original Dramatic Score and Best Original Musical or Comedy Score in 1996. This change proved unpopular in the other branches of the Academy as Charles Bernstein, chairman of the Academy's rules committee, noted that "no other Oscar category depended on a film's genre" and "the job of composing an underscore for a romantic comedy is not substantially different from working on a heavy drama." This split was reverted in 2000.

In 2020, rules were changed to require that a film's score include a minimum of 60% original music. Franchise films and sequels must include a minimum of 80% new music. In 2021, the rules were changed again, lowering the minimum percentage of original music from 60% to 35% of the total music in the film.

== Academy Award for Best Original Musical ==
The Academy Award for Best Original Musical is a category that was re-established in 2000 after the Best Original Musical or Comedy Score category was retired. It has never been awarded in its present form due to a prolonged drought of films meeting the sufficient eligibility requirements. The Music Branch Executive Committee of the Academy decides whether there are enough quality submissions to justify its activation.

According to the rules, the Best Original Musical is defined as follows:

An original musical consists of not fewer than five original songs by the same writer or team of writers, either used as voiceovers or visually performed. Each of these songs must be substantively rendered, clearly audible, intelligible, and must further the storyline of the motion picture. An arbitrary group of songs unessential to the storyline will not be considered eligible.

== Winners and nominees ==
The following is the list of nominated composers organized by year, and listing both films and composers. The years shown in the following list of winners are the production years, thus a reference to 1967 means the Oscars presented in 1968 for films released in 1967.

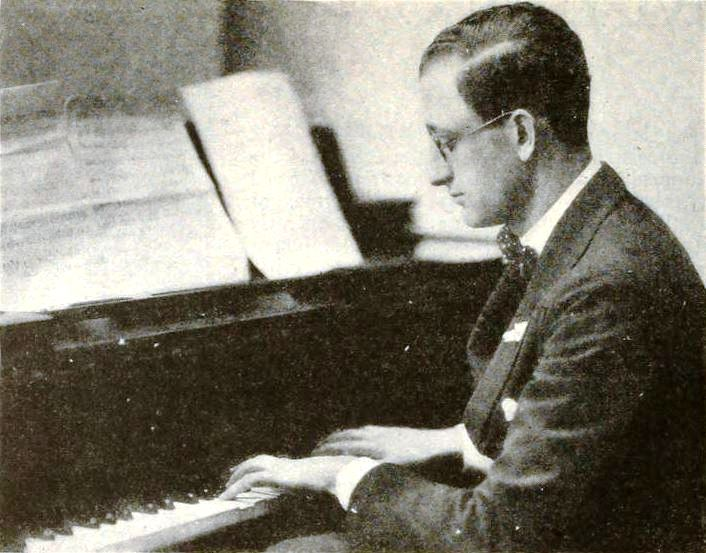
Louis Silvers was the inaugural winner of this category, winning for One Night of Love (1934).

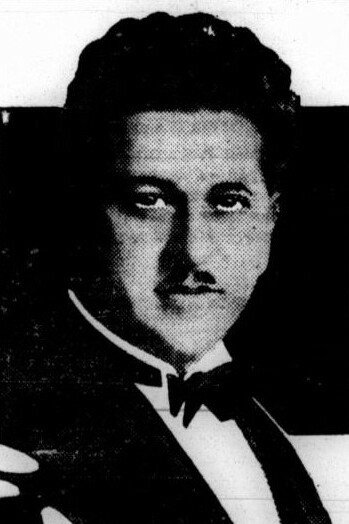
Charles Previn won for One Hundred Men and a Girl (1937), the first and only win for a Department head and not the composer.

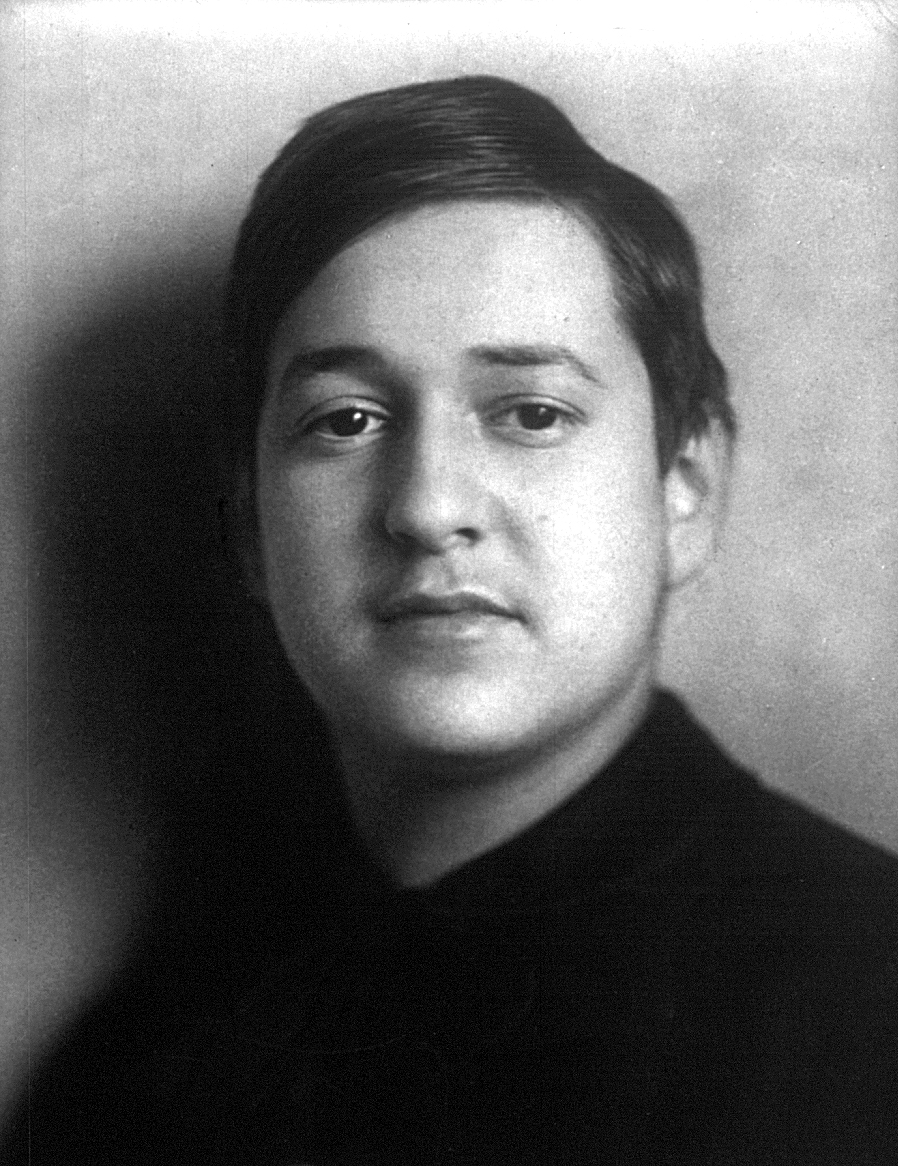
Erich Korngold won for The Adventures of Robin Hood (1938).

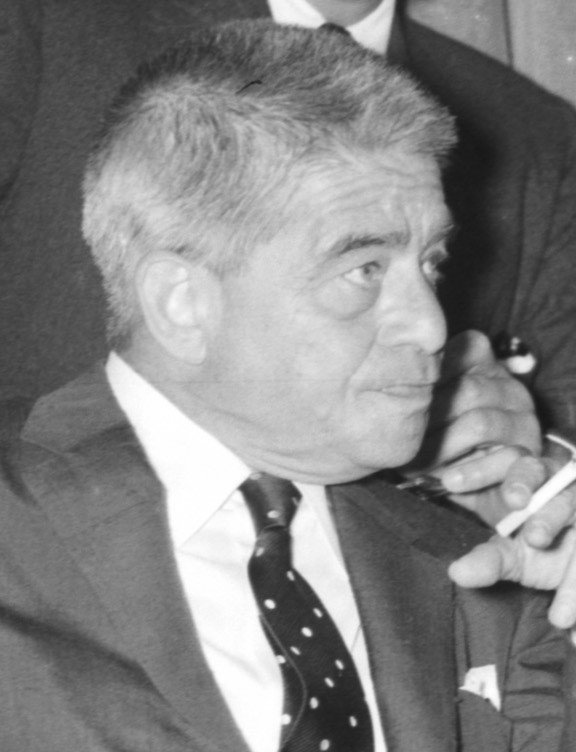
Alfred Newman has won the most awards in this category with 9 wins among 43 nominations. He won for Alexander's Ragtime Band (1938), Tin Pan Alley (1940), The Song of Bernadette (1940), Mother Wore Tights (1947), With a Song in My Heart (1952), Call Me Madam (1953), The King and I (1956), and Camelot (1967).

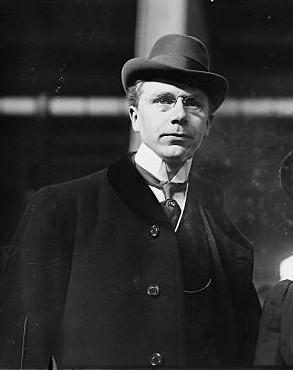
Richard Hageman won alongside W. Franke Harling, John Leipold and Leo Shuken for Stagecoach (1939).

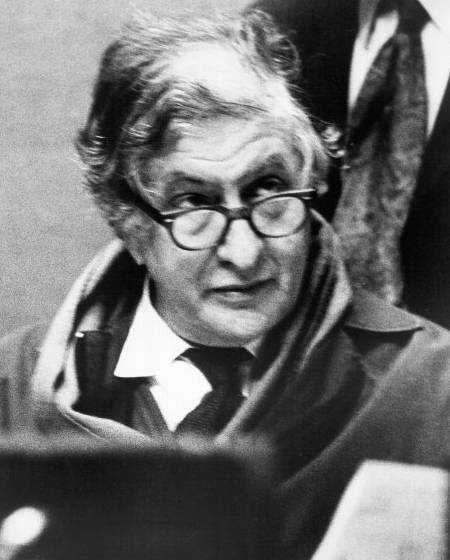
Bernard Herrmann won once out of five nominations for The Devil and Daniel Webster (1941).

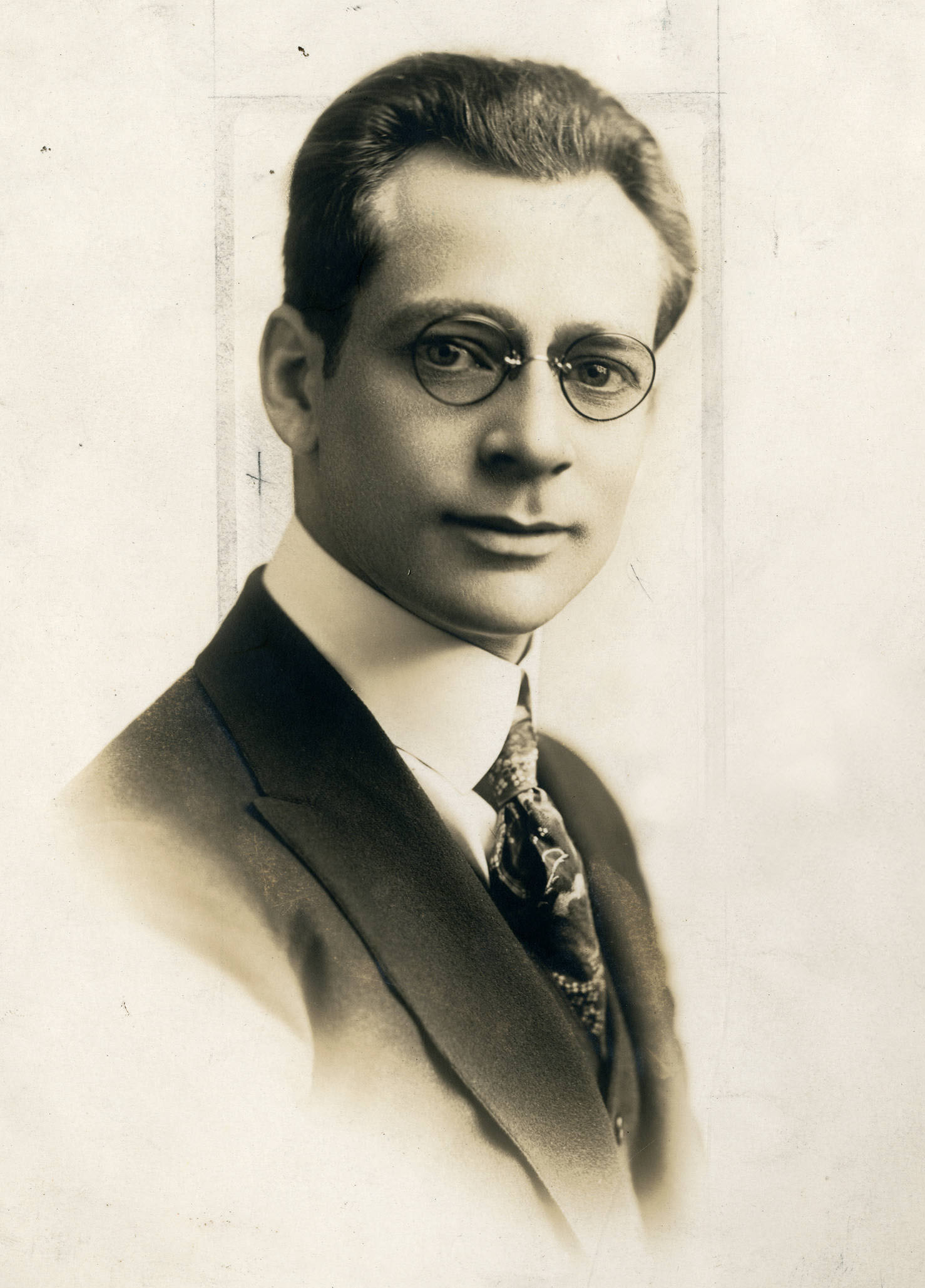
Oliver Wallace won alongside Frank Churchill for Dumbo (1941).

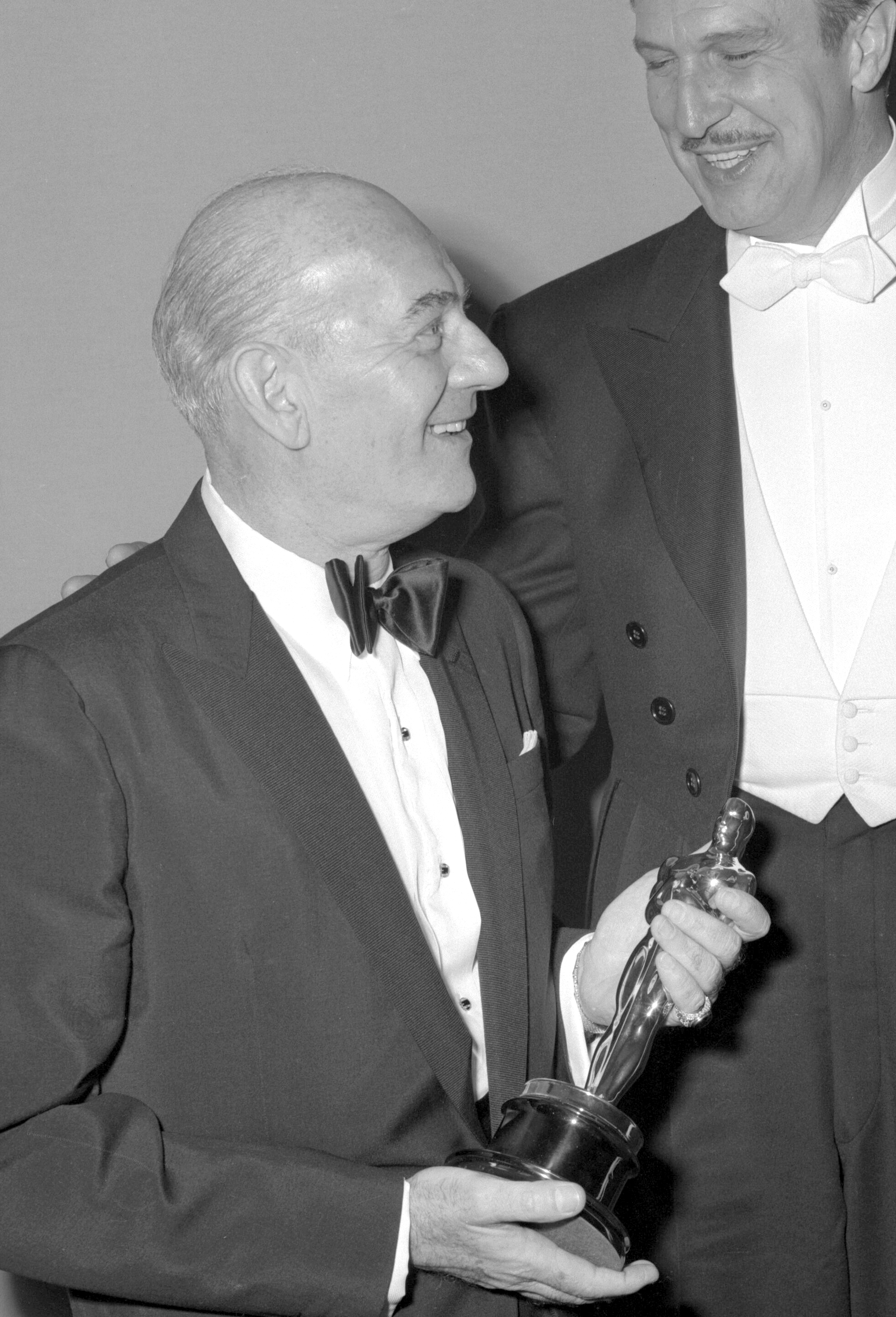
Morris Stoloff won this award twice, his first win alongside Carmen Dragon for Cover Girl (1944), and his second alongside Harry Sukman for Song Without End (1960).

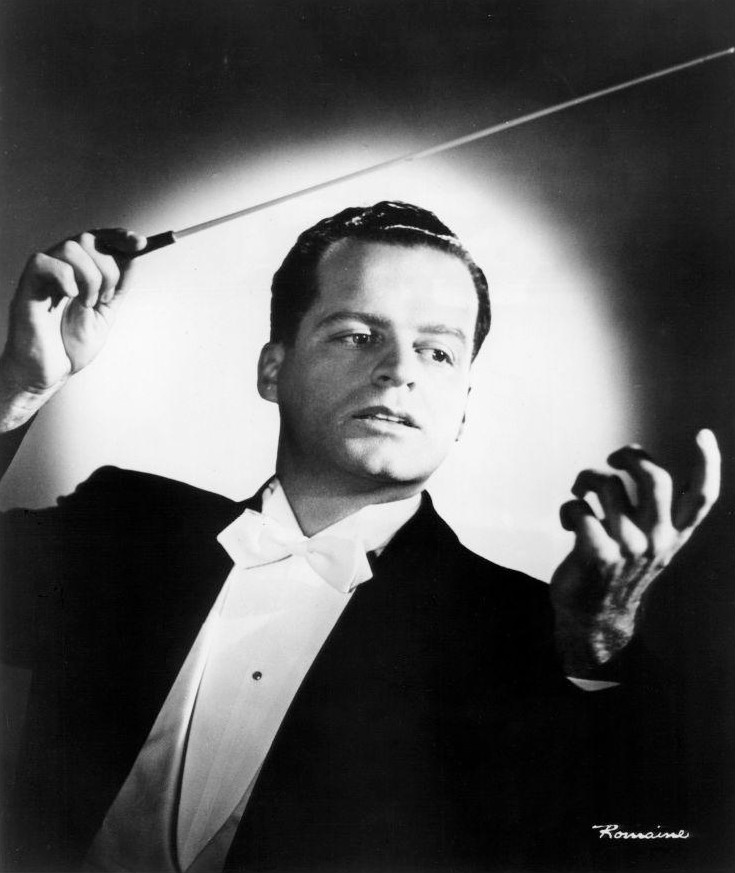
Carmen Dragon won alongside Morris Stoloff for Cover Girl (1944).

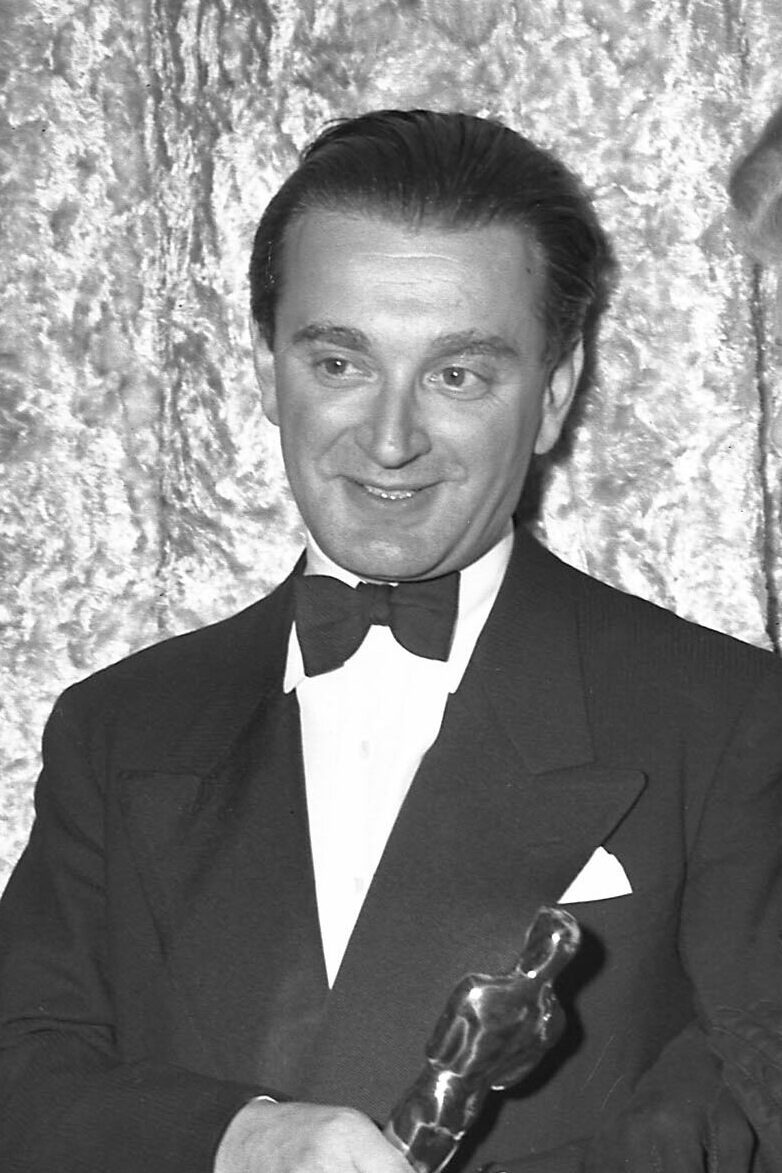
Miklós Rózsa was nominated 16 times winning thrice for Spellbound (1945), A Double Life (1947), and Ben-Hur (1959).

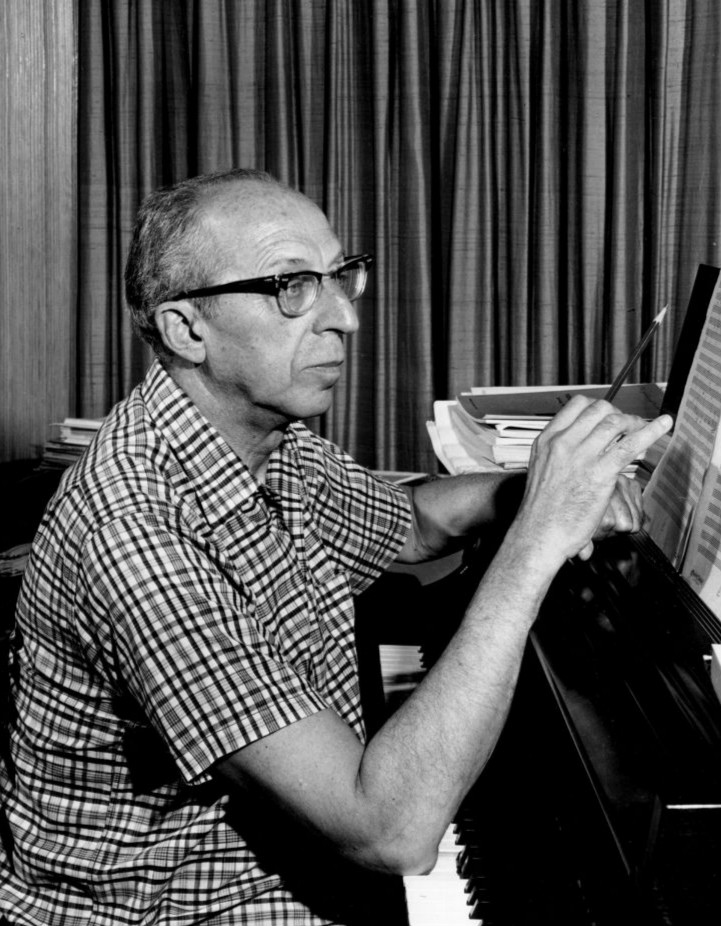
Aaron Copland won for The Heiress (1949.)

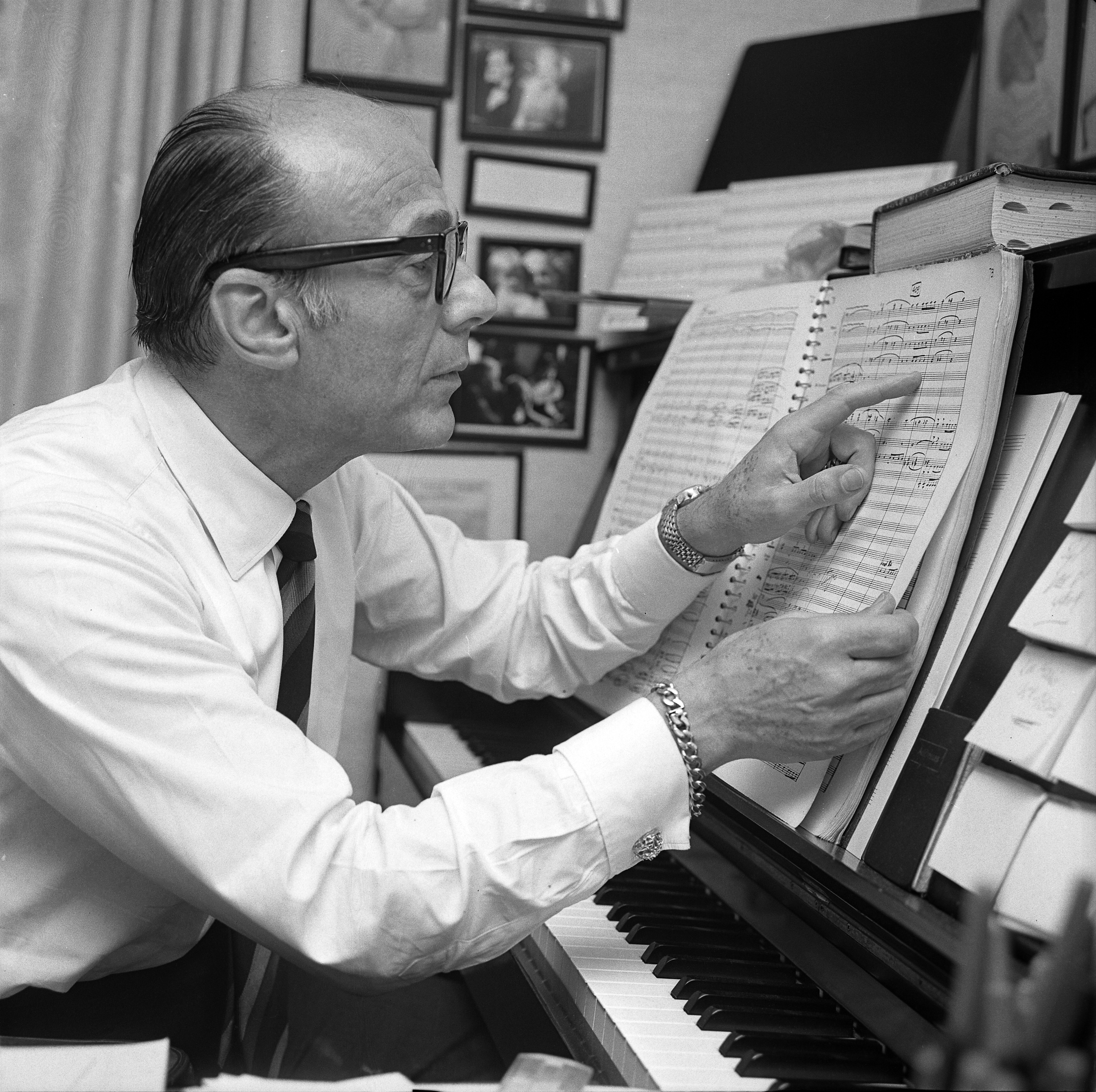
Johnny Green won for four times in this category: Easter Parade (1948) with Roger Edens, An American in Paris (1951) with Saul Chaplin, West Side Story (1961) alongside Saul Chaplin, Irwin Kostal and Sid Ramin, and Oliver! (1968).

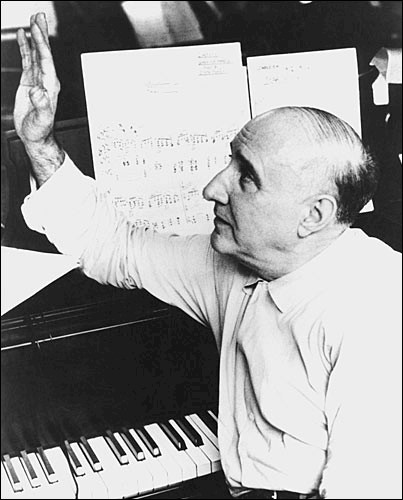
Dimitri Tiomkin won three times amongst 14 nominations, winning for High Noon (1952), The High and the Mighty (1954), and The Old Man and the Sea (1958).

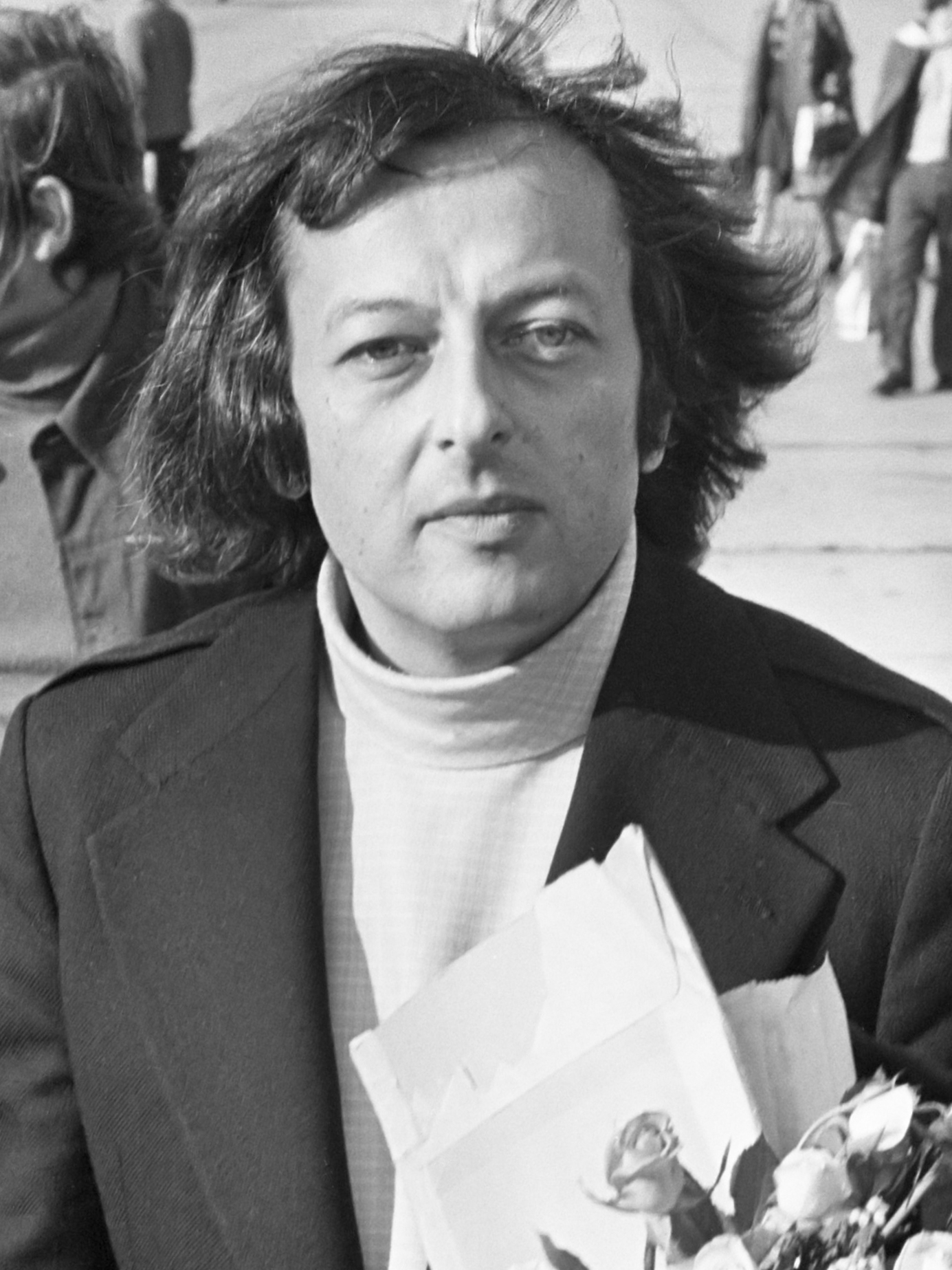
André Previn won four times amongst 11 nominations, winning for Gigi (1958), Porgy and Bess (1959), Irma la Douce (1963), and My Fair Lady (1964).

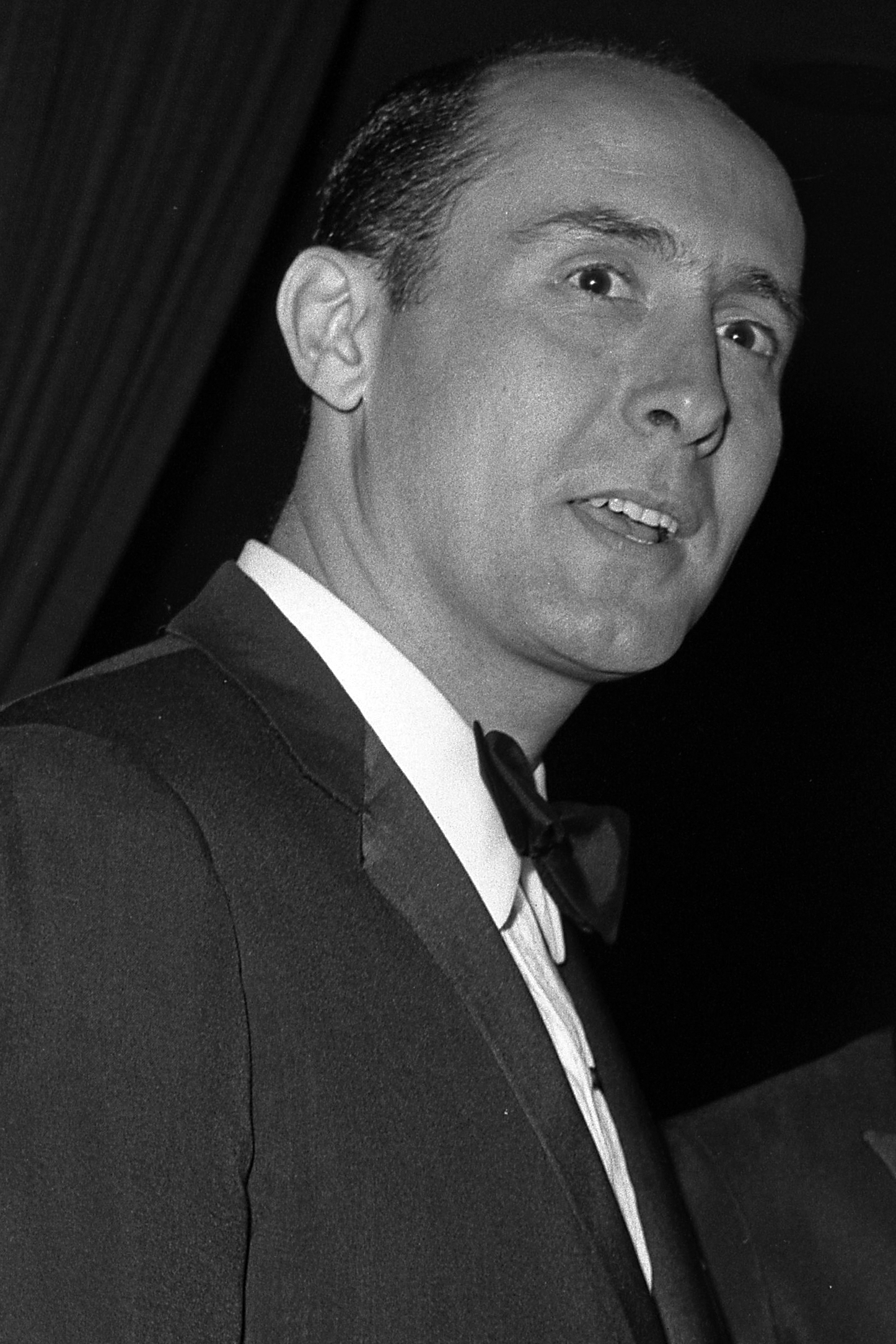
Henry Mancini won twice for Breakfast at Tiffany's (1961) and Victor/Victoria (1982).

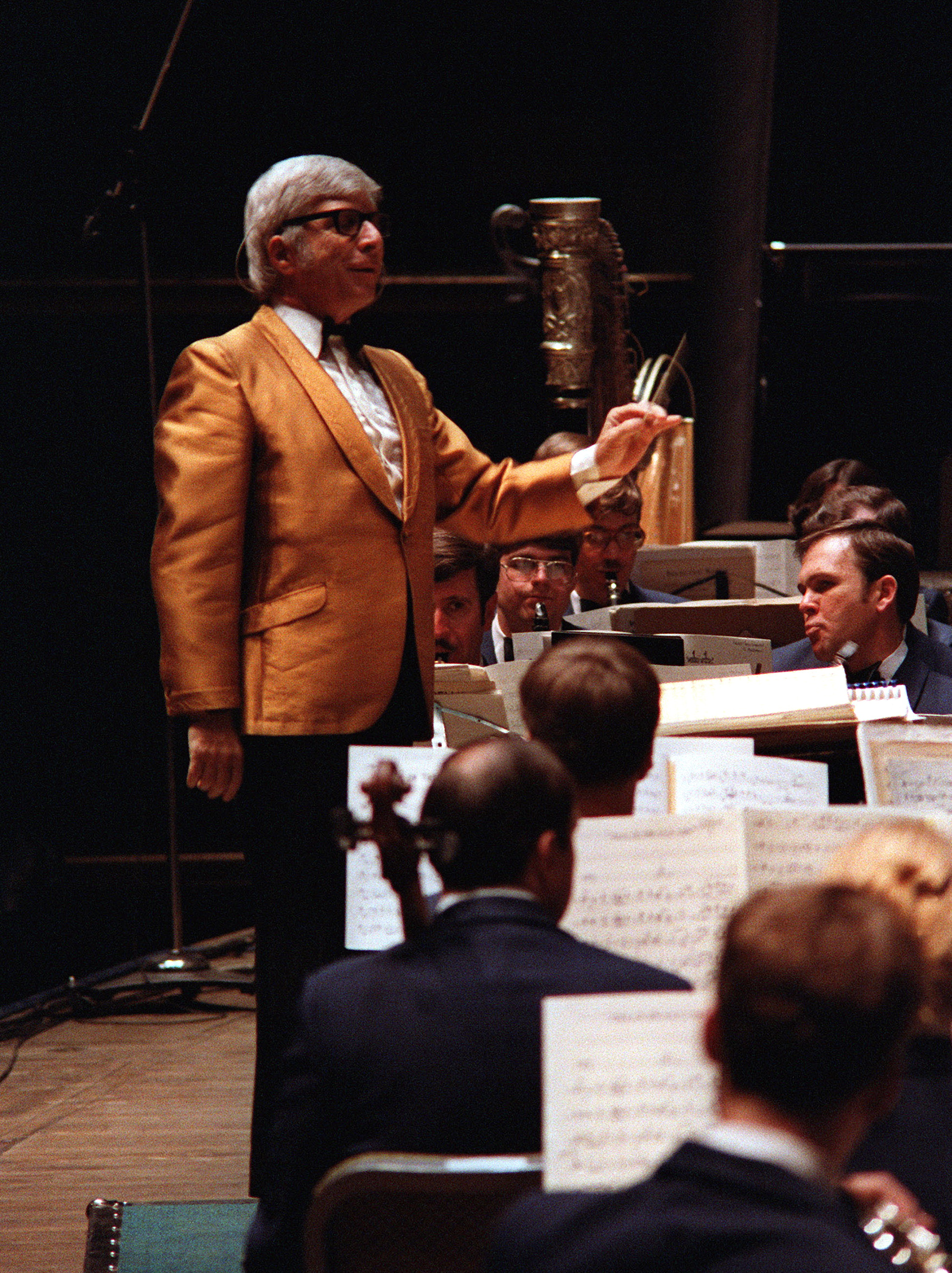
Elmer Bernstein was nominated 10 times, winning only once for Thoroughly Modern Millie (1967).

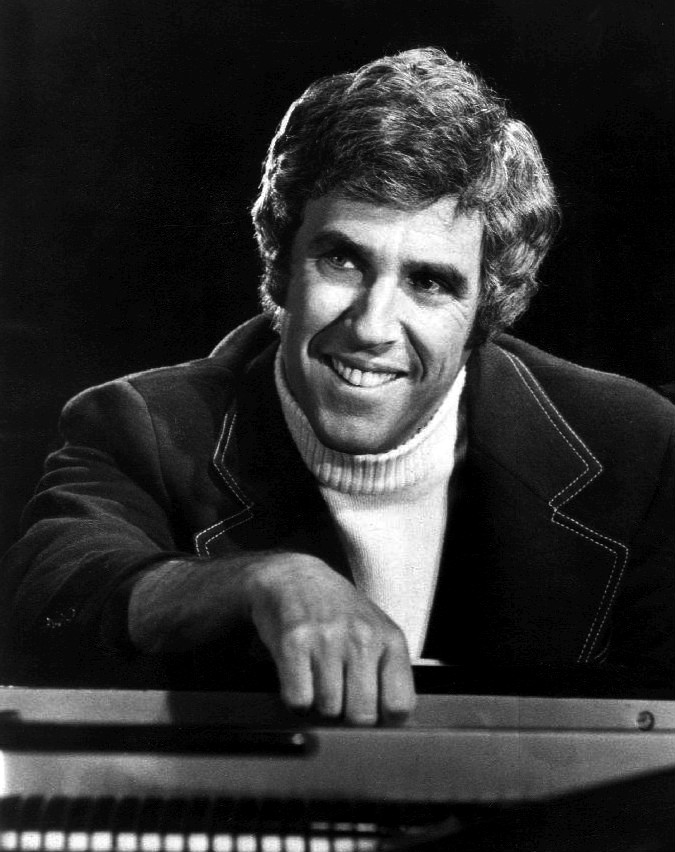
Burt Bacharach won for Butch Cassidy and the Sundance Kid (1969).

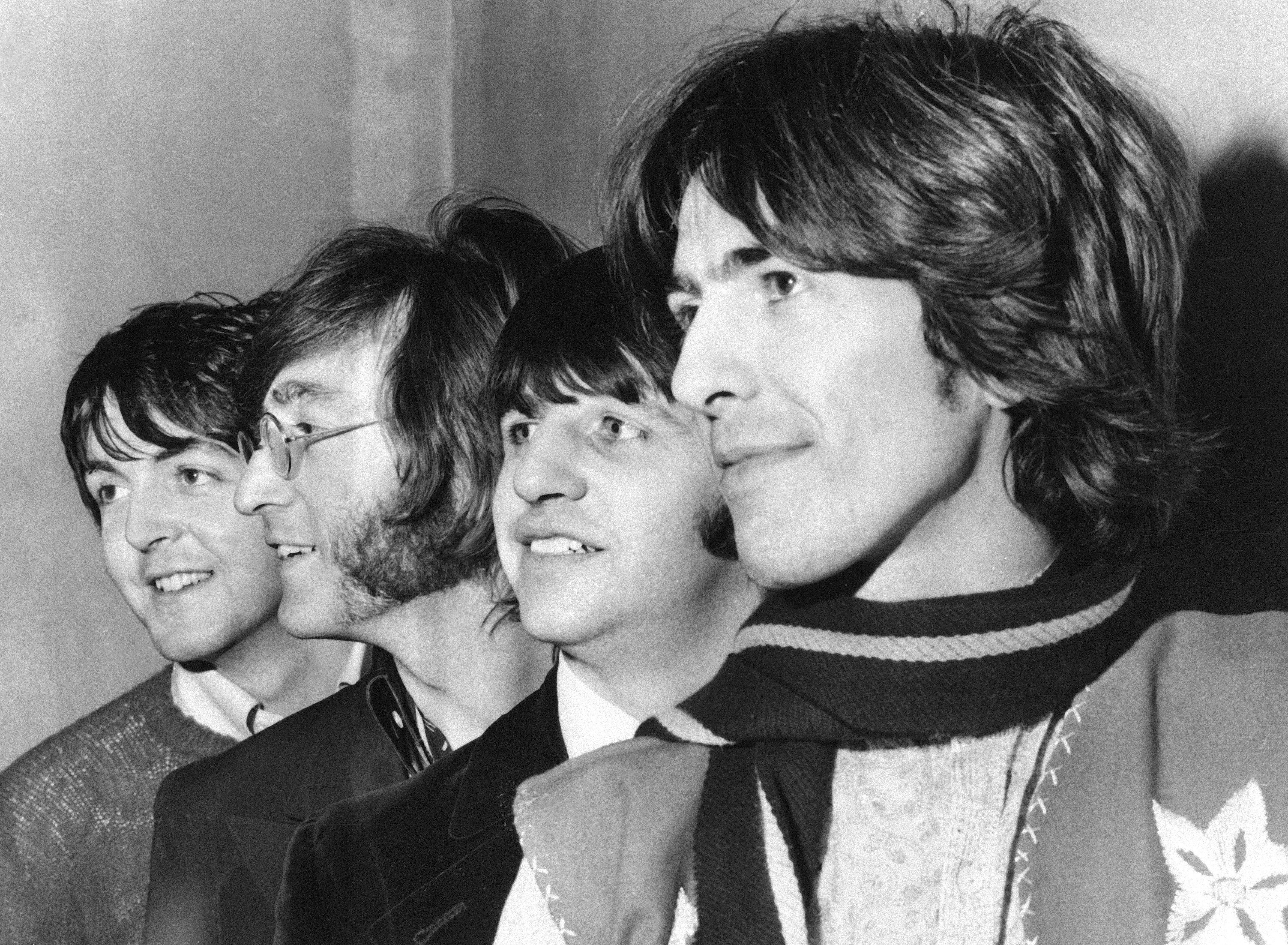
The Beatles won for Let It Be (1970).

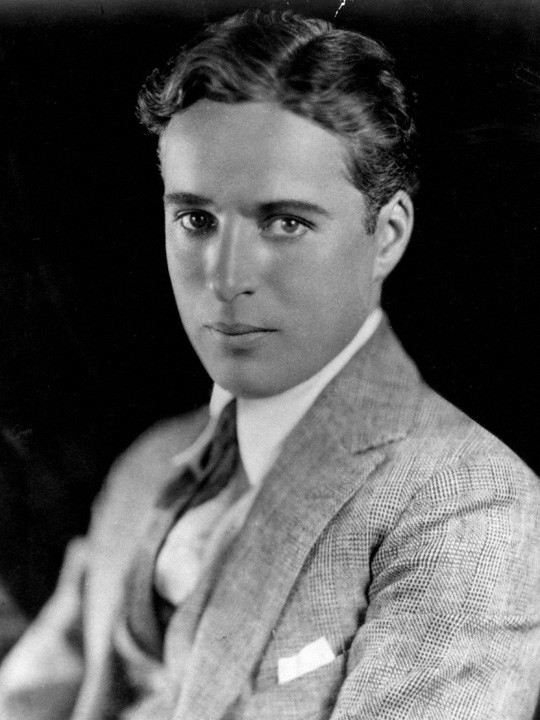
Charlie Chaplin won for Limelight (1971).

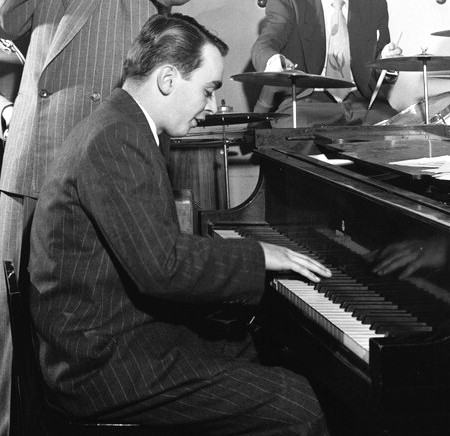
Ralph Burns won for Cabaret (1972).

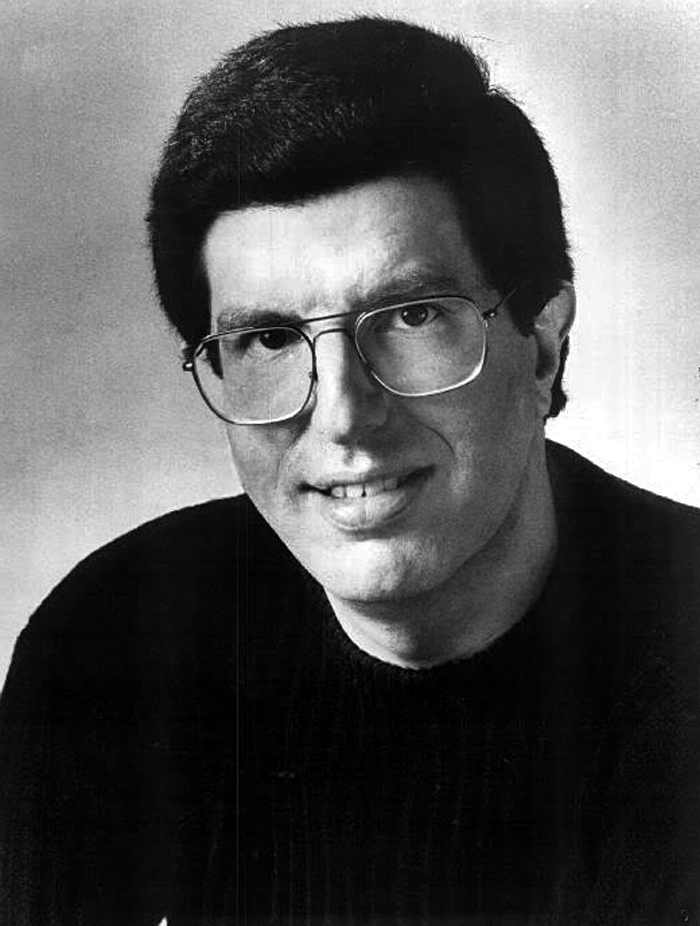
Marvin Hamlisch won twice in the same year for The Way We Were and The Sting both in 1973.

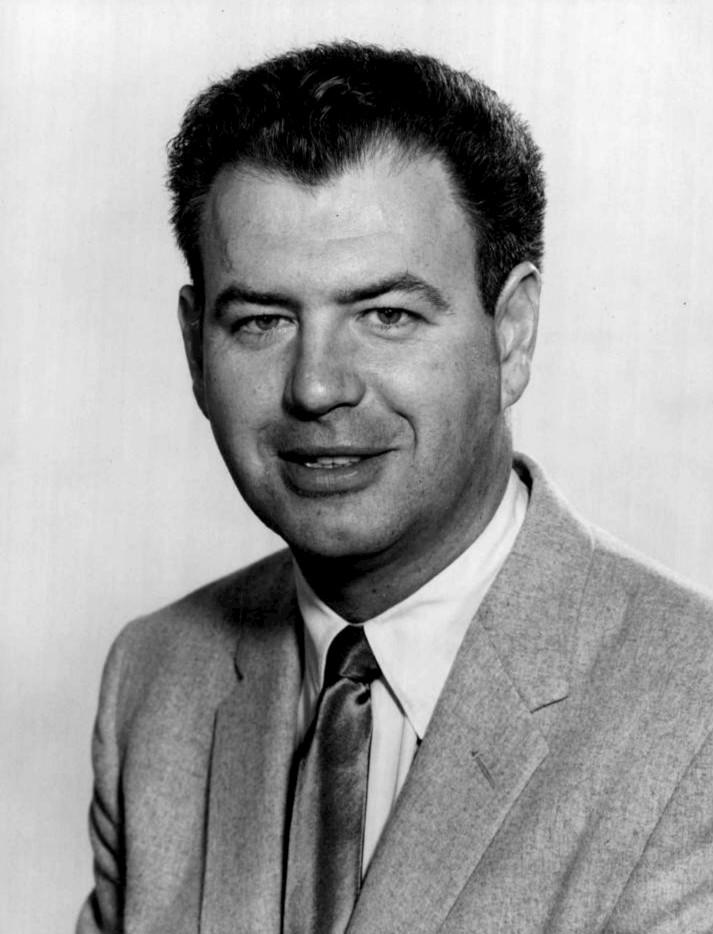
Nelson Riddle won for The Great Gatsby (1974).

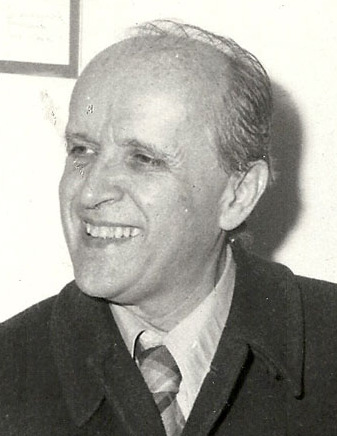
Nino Rota won for The Godfather Part II (1974).

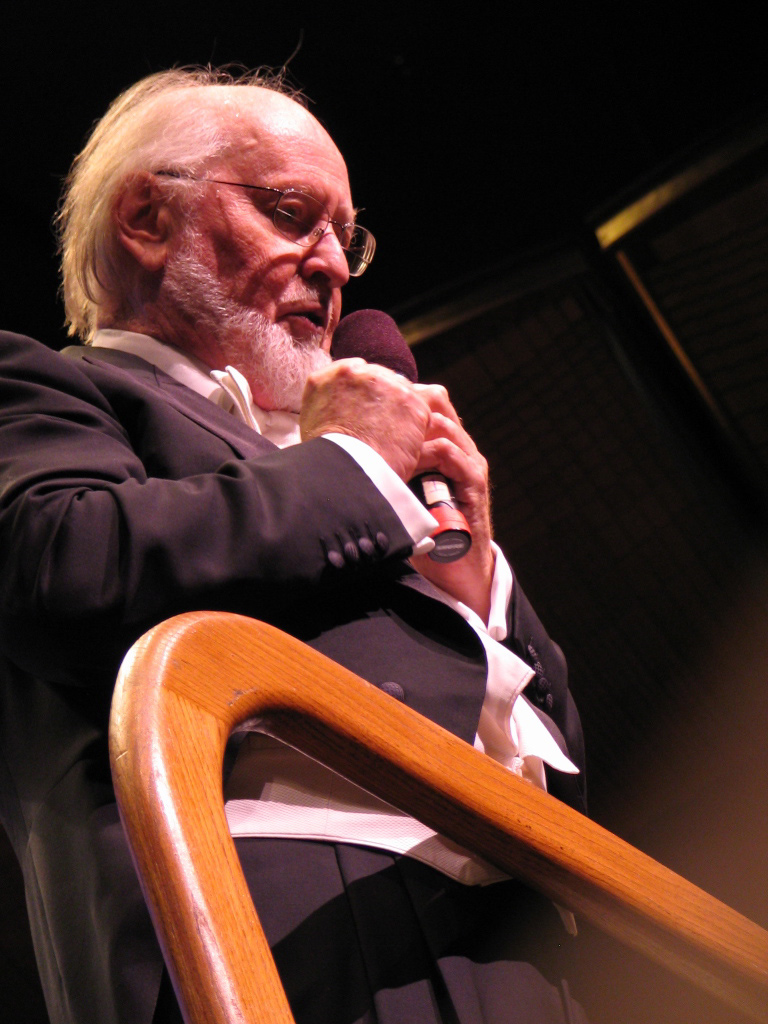
John Williams has been nominated a record 49 times, winning five times for Fiddler on the Roof (1971), Jaws (1975), Star Wars (1977), E.T. the Extra-Terrestrial (1982) and Schindler's List (1993).

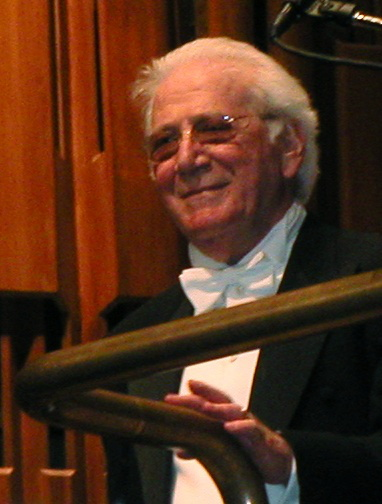
Jerry Goldsmith won for The Omen (1976).

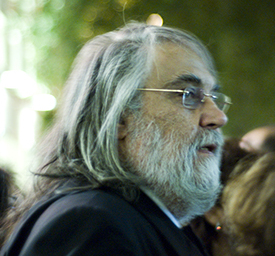
Vangelis won for Chariots of Fire (1981).

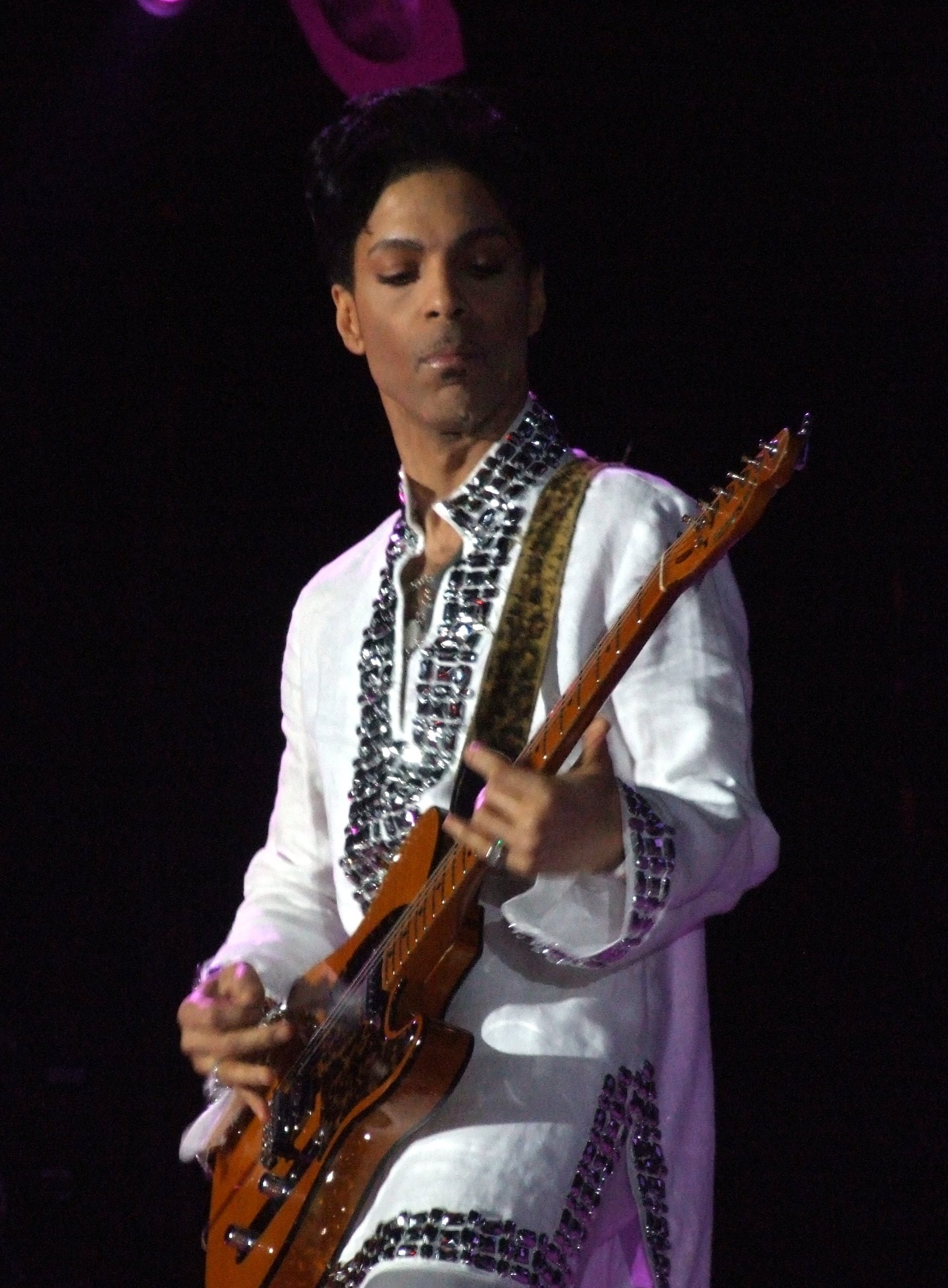
Prince won for Purple Rain (1985).

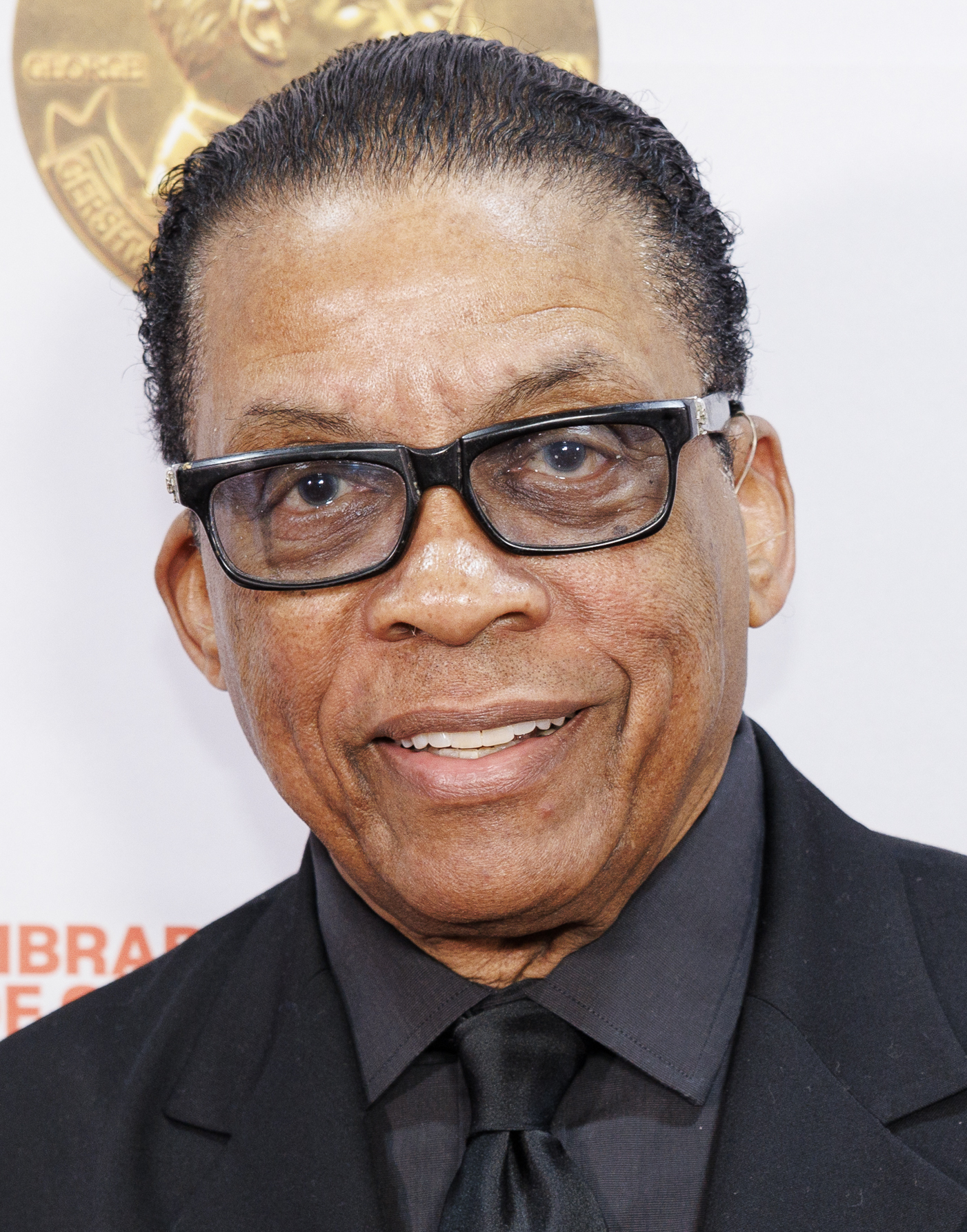
Herbie Hancock won for Round Midnight (1986).

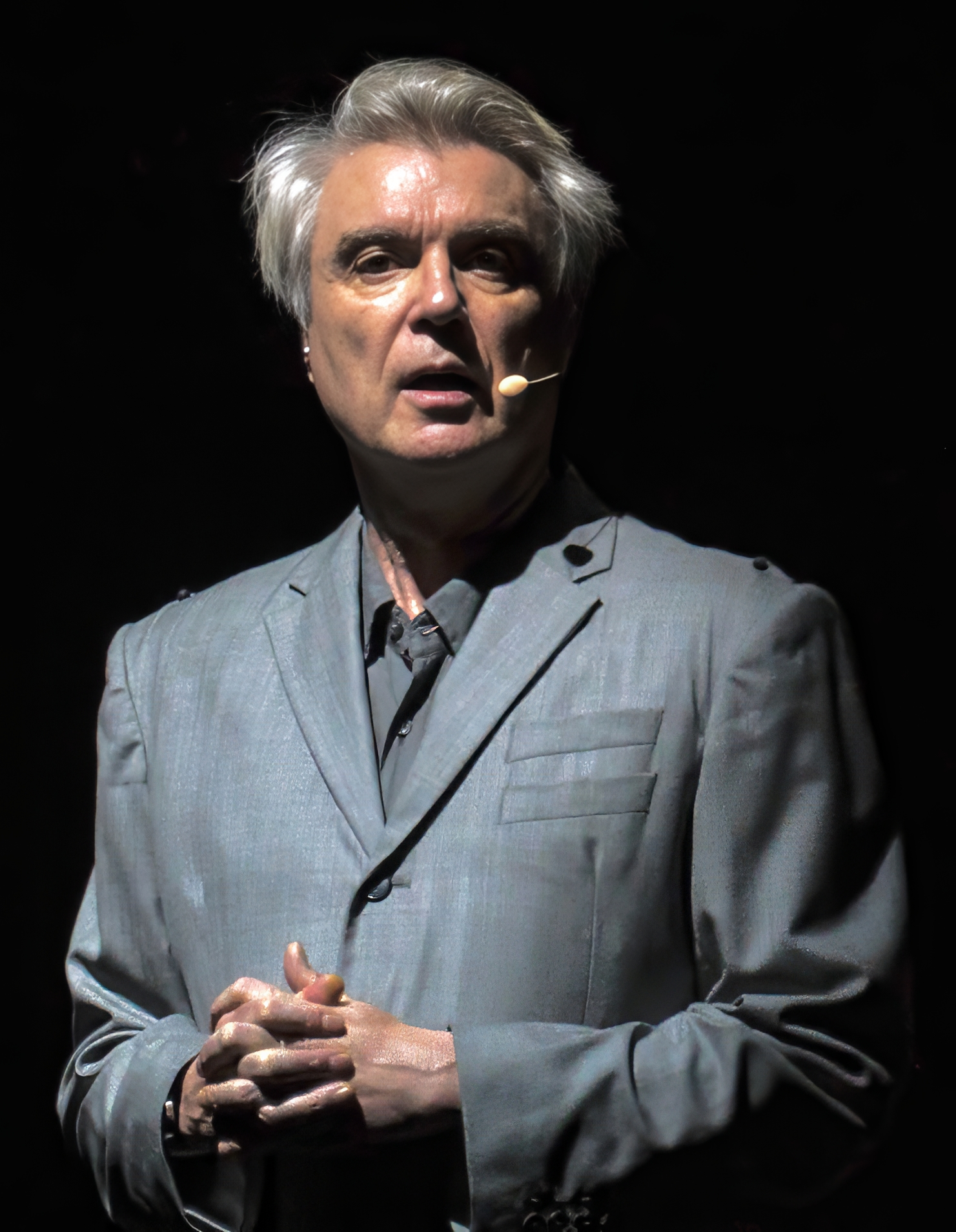
David Byrne won for The Last Emperor (1987).

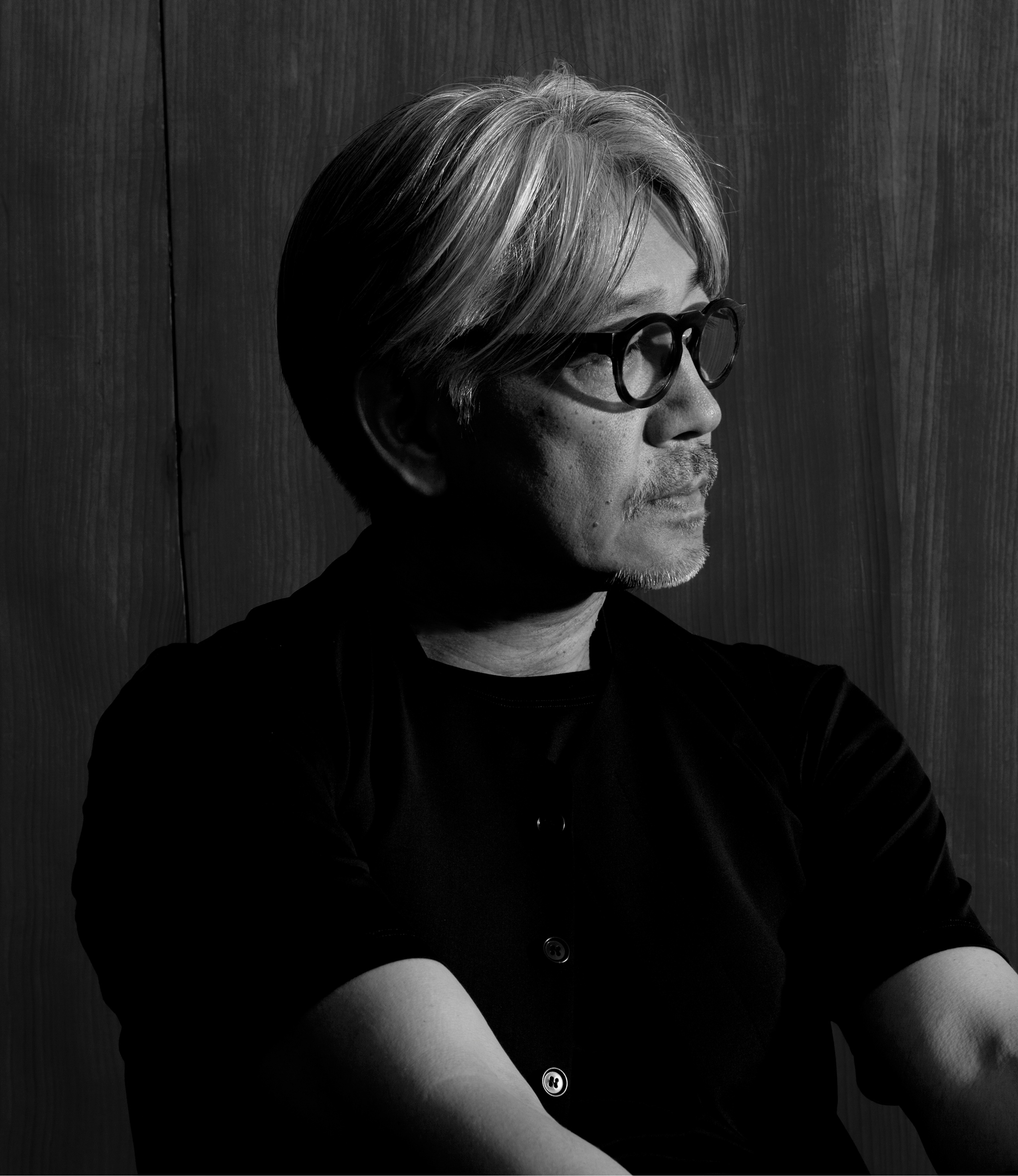
Ryuichi Sakamoto won for The Last Emperor (1987).

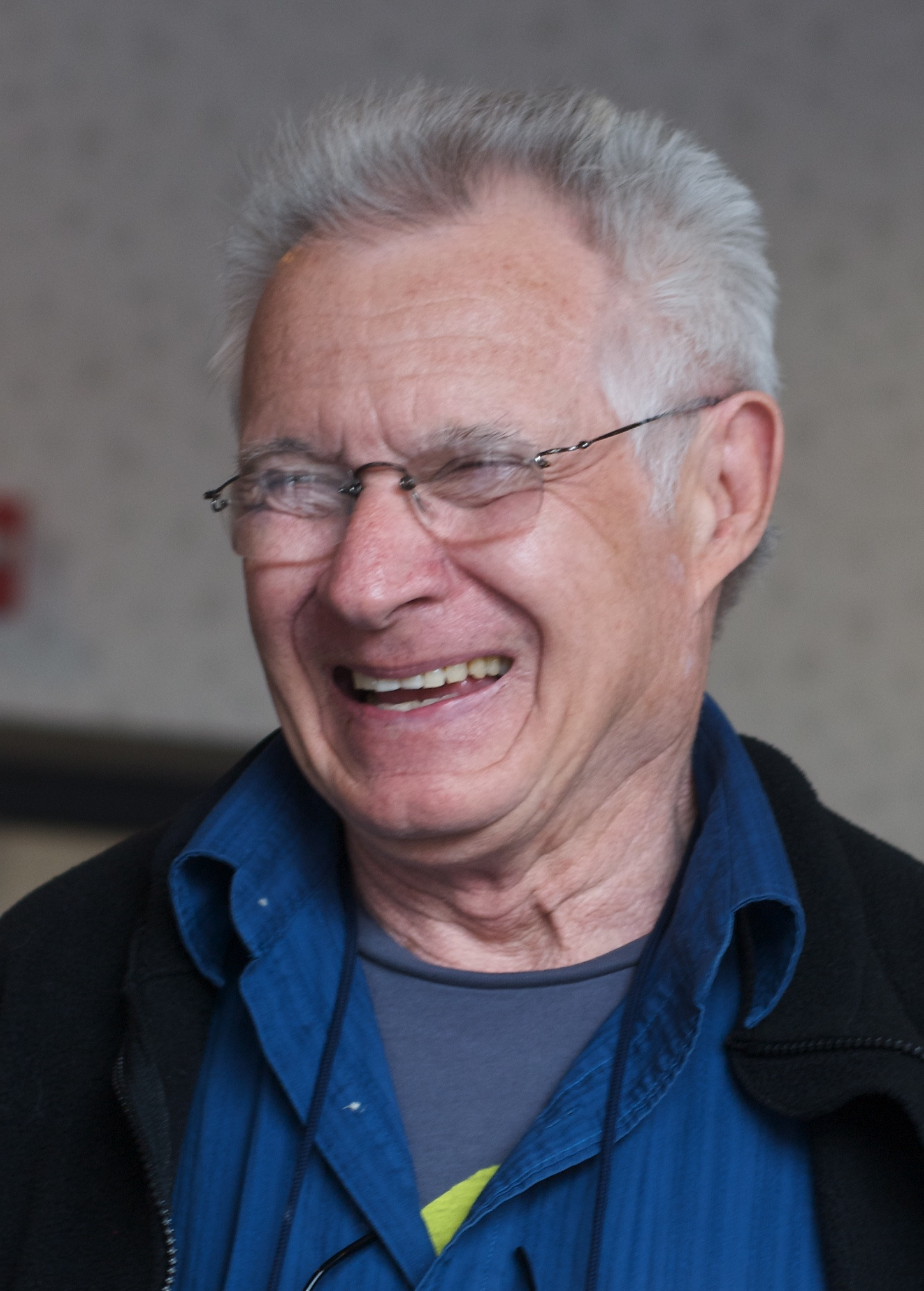
Dave Grusin won for The Milagro Beanfield War (1988).

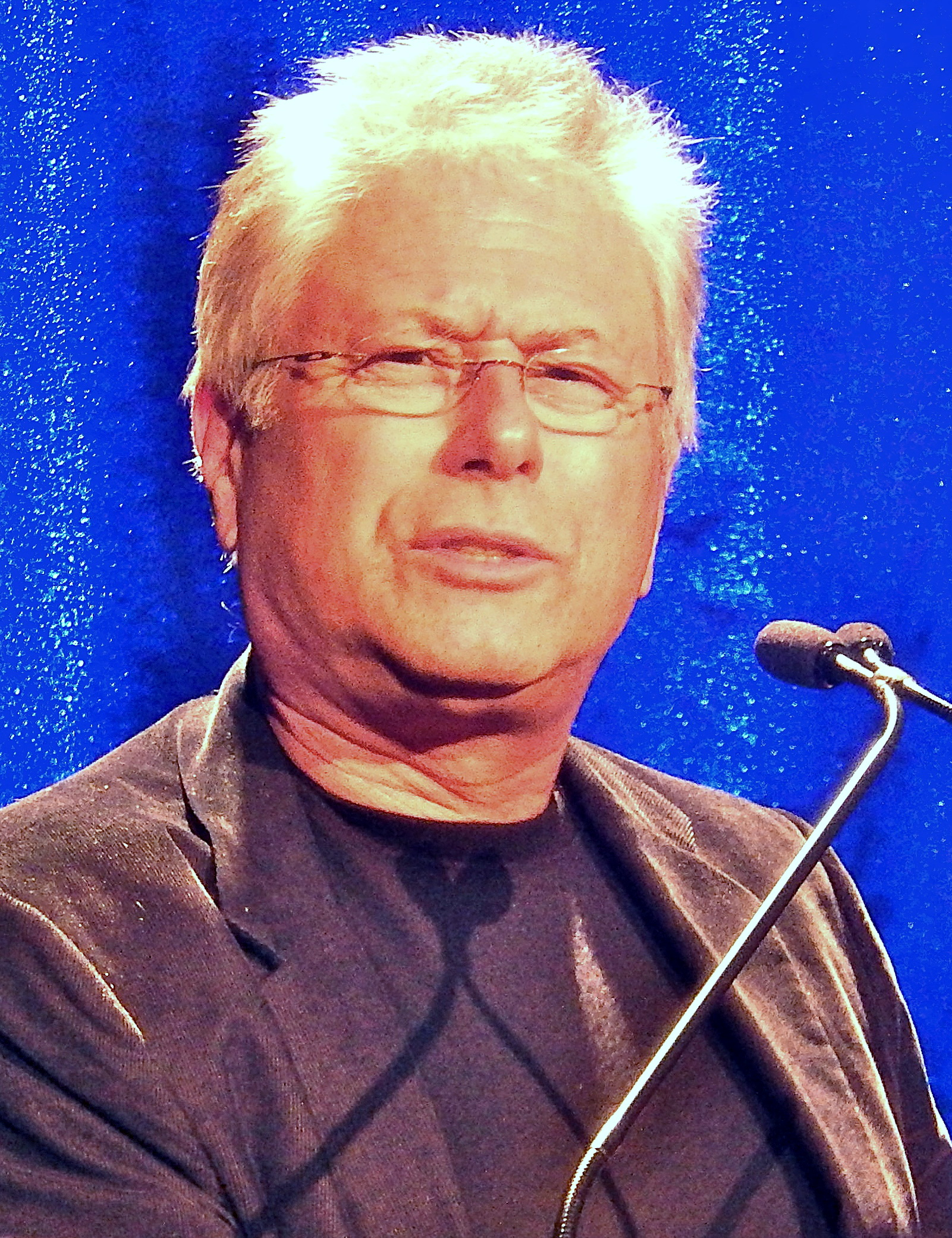
Alan Menken won four times for The Little Mermaid (1989), Beauty and the Beast (1991), Aladdin (1992), and Pocahontas (1995).

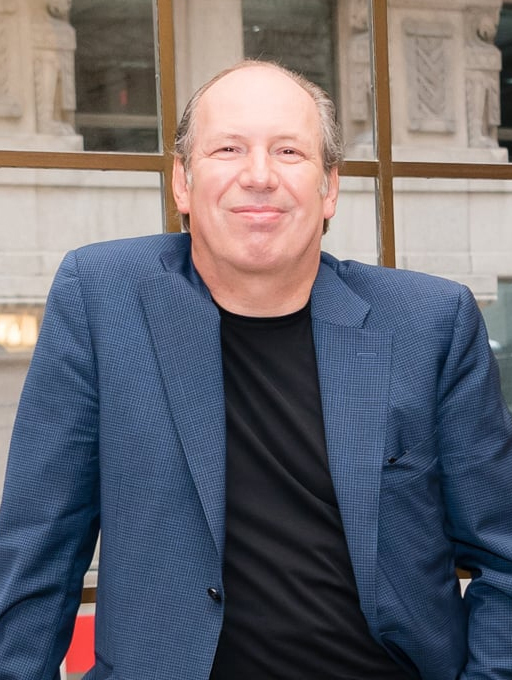
Hans Zimmer won twice for The Lion King (1994) and Dune (2021).

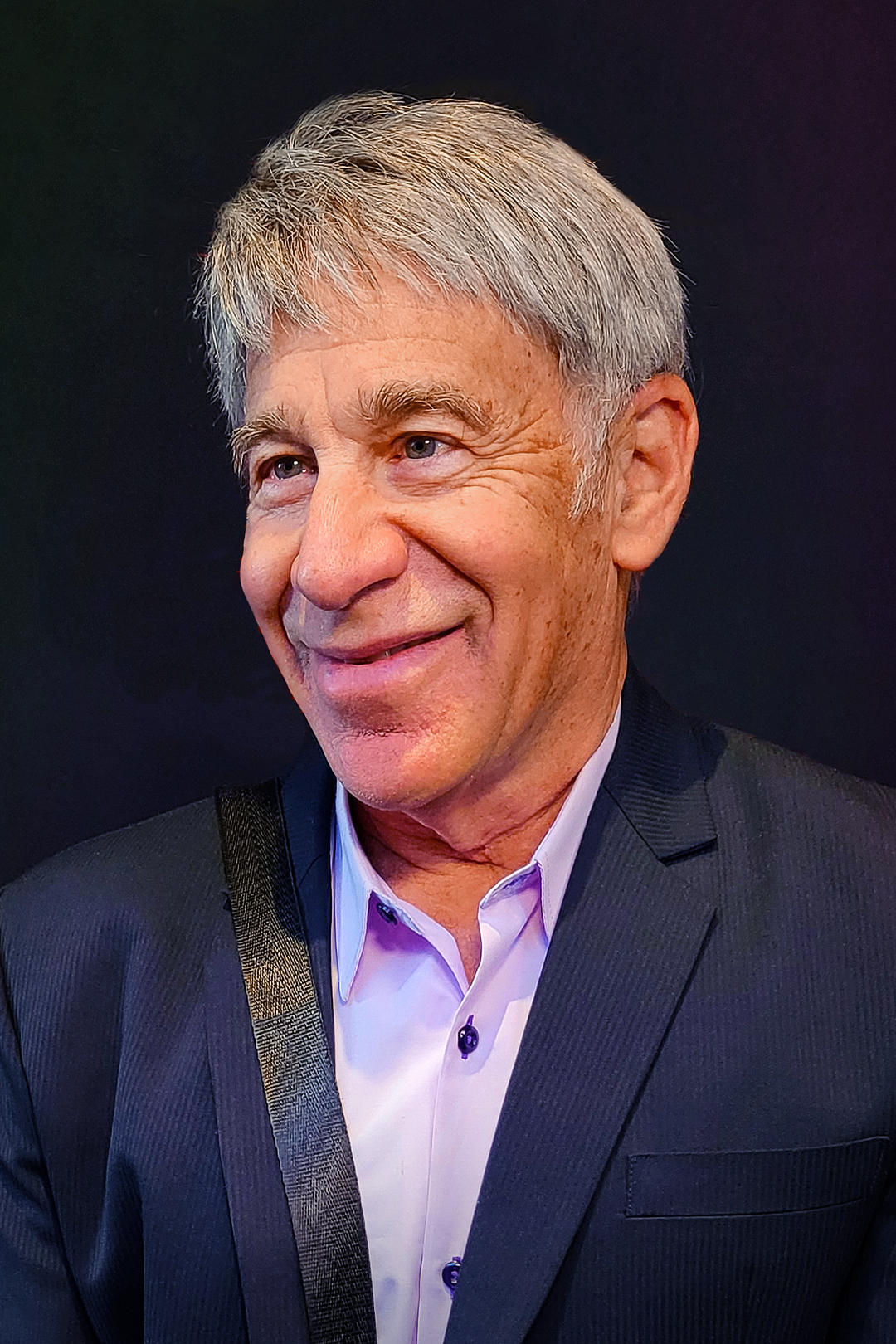
Stephen Schwartz won for Pocahontas (1995).

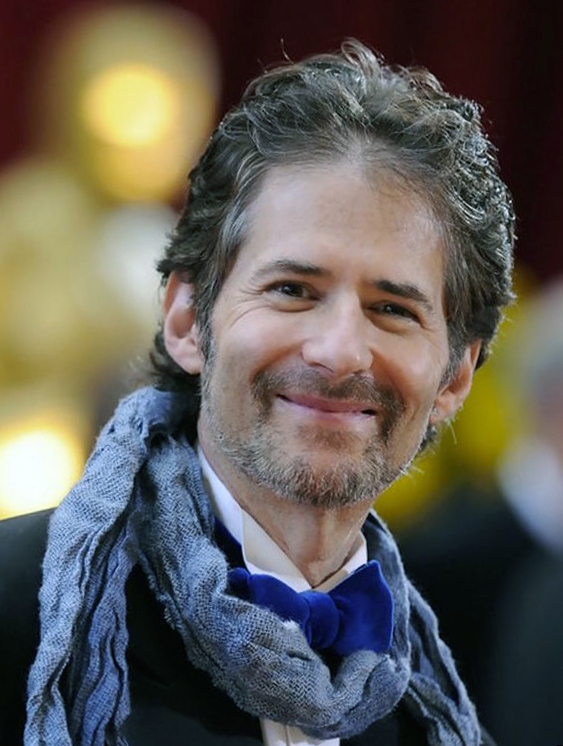
James Horner won for Titanic (1997).

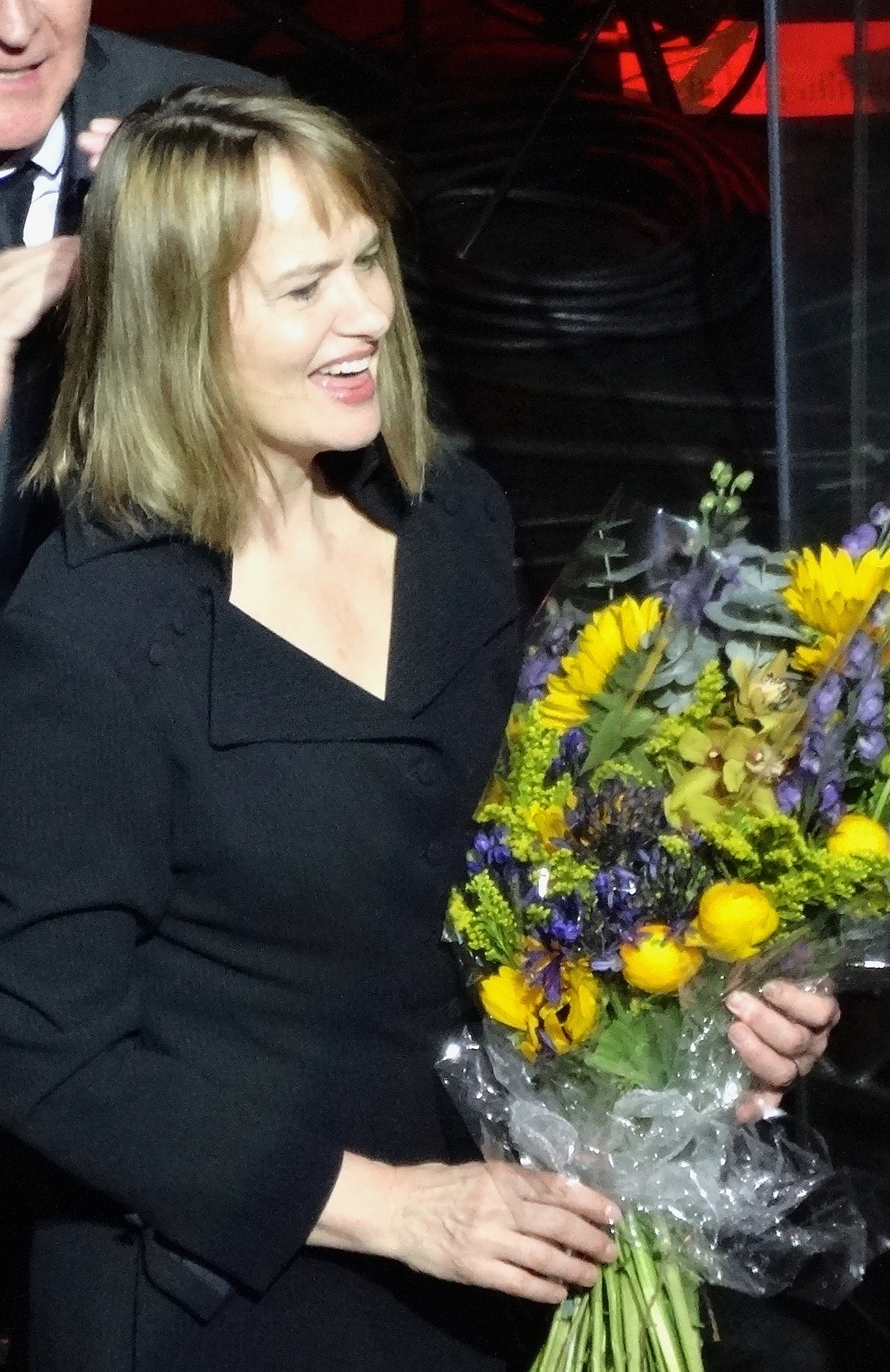
Anne Dudley won for The Full Monty (1997).

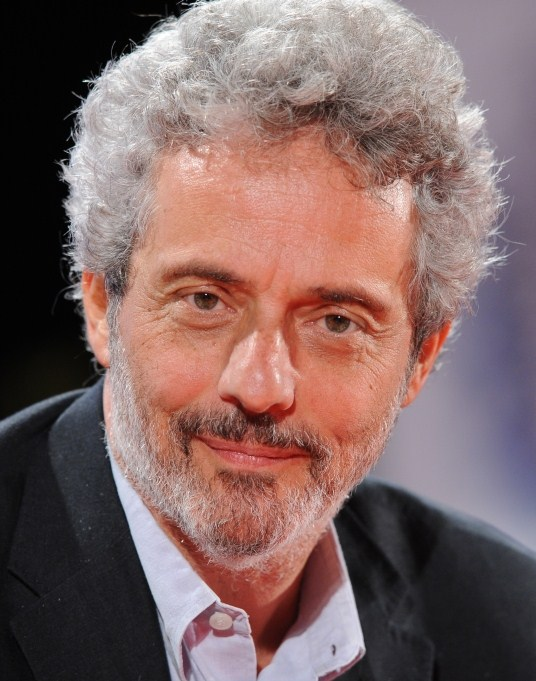
Nicola Piovani won for Life is Beautiful (1998).

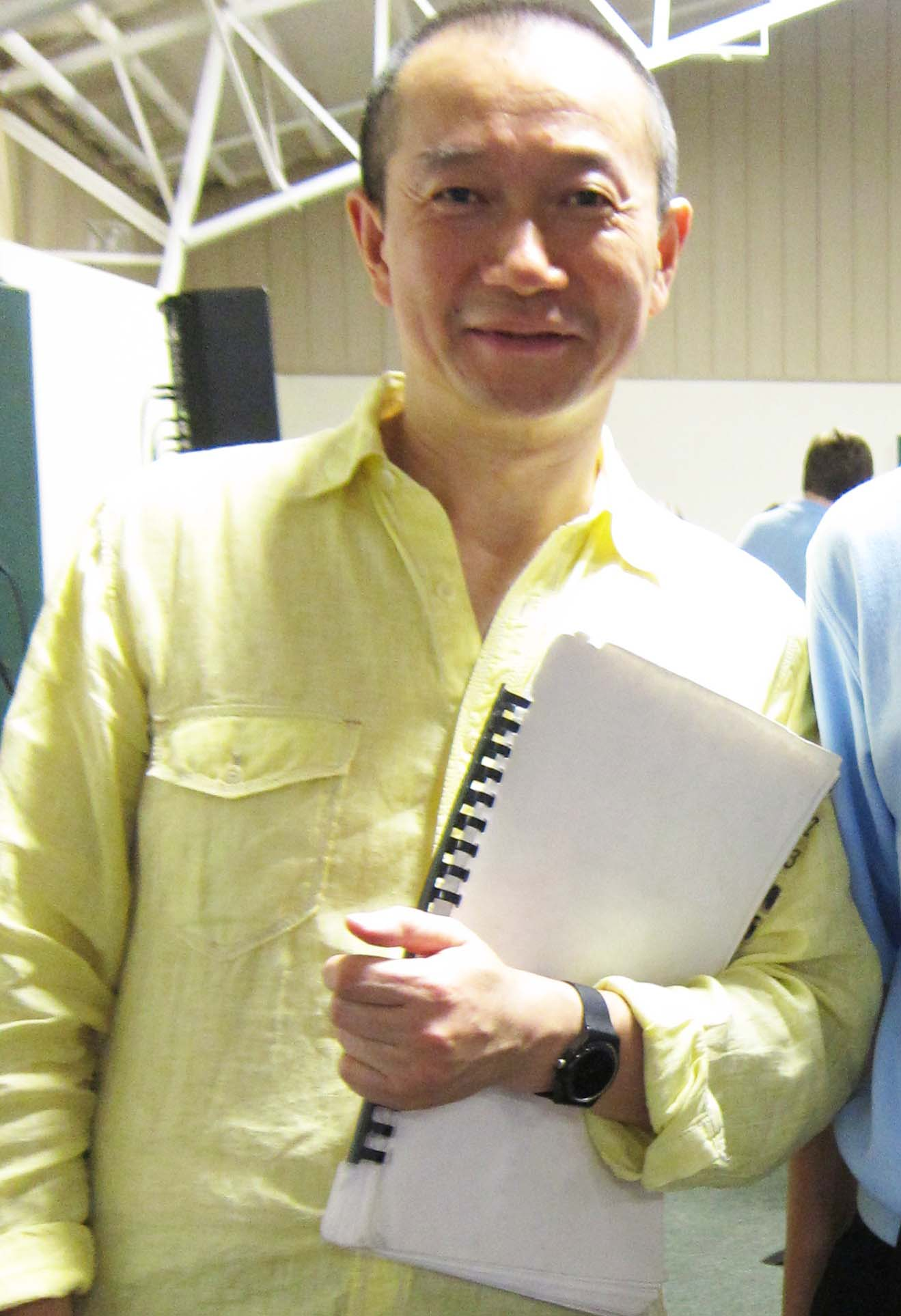
Tan Dun won for Crouching Tiger, Hidden Dragon (2000).

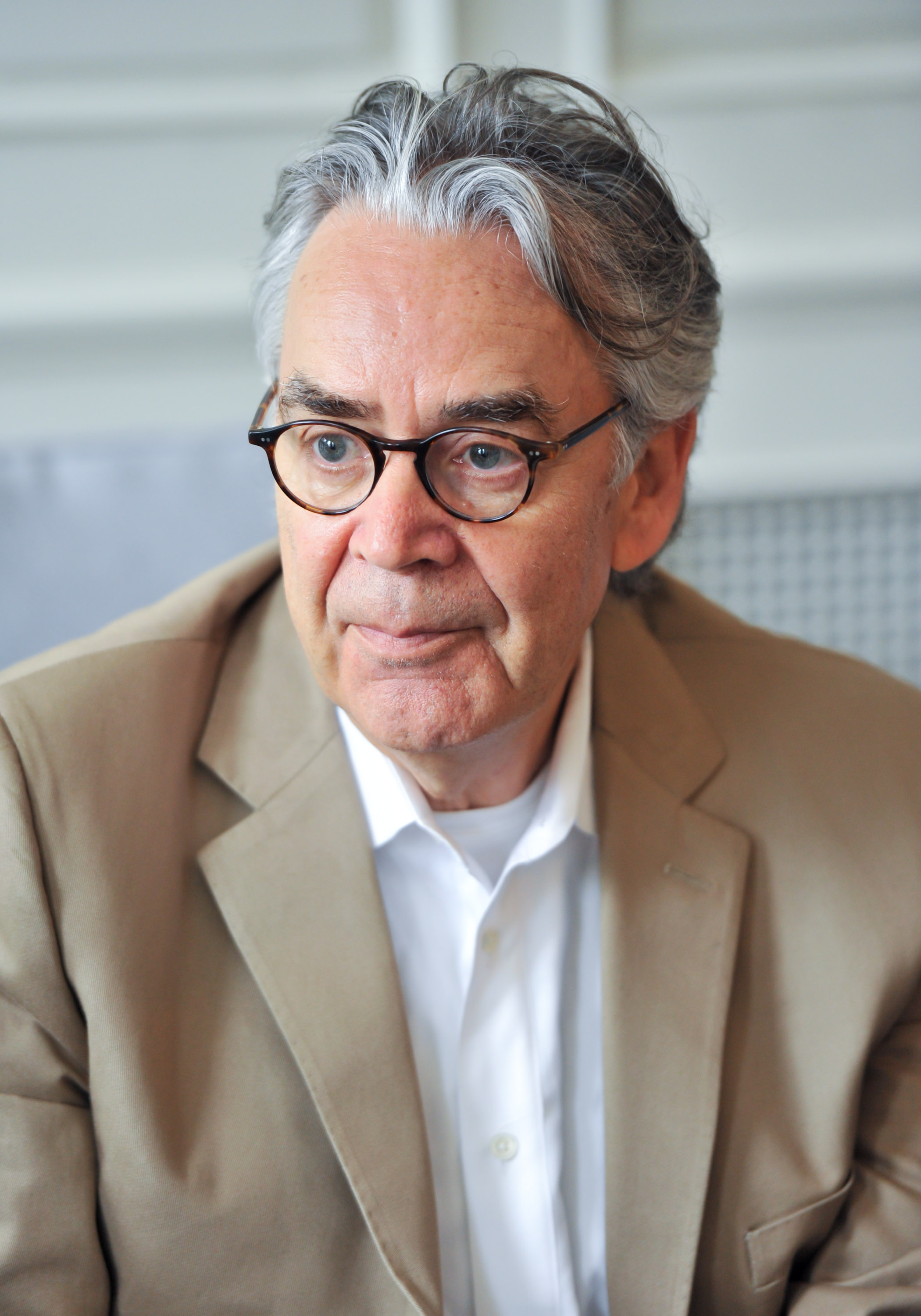
Howard Shore won twice for The Lord of the Rings: The Fellowship of the Ring (2001) and The Lord of the Rings: The Return of the King (2003).

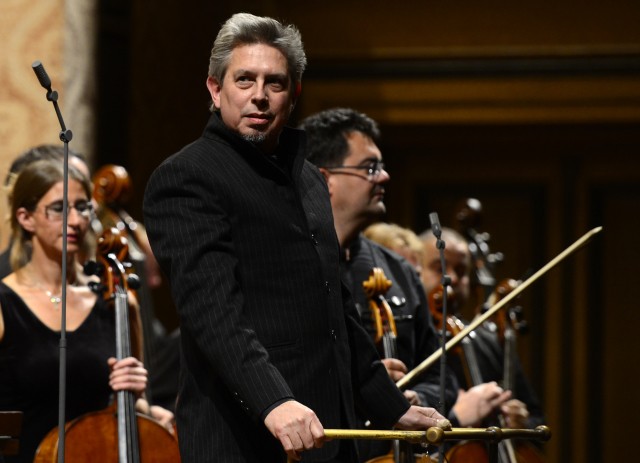
Elliot Goldenthal won for Frida (2002).

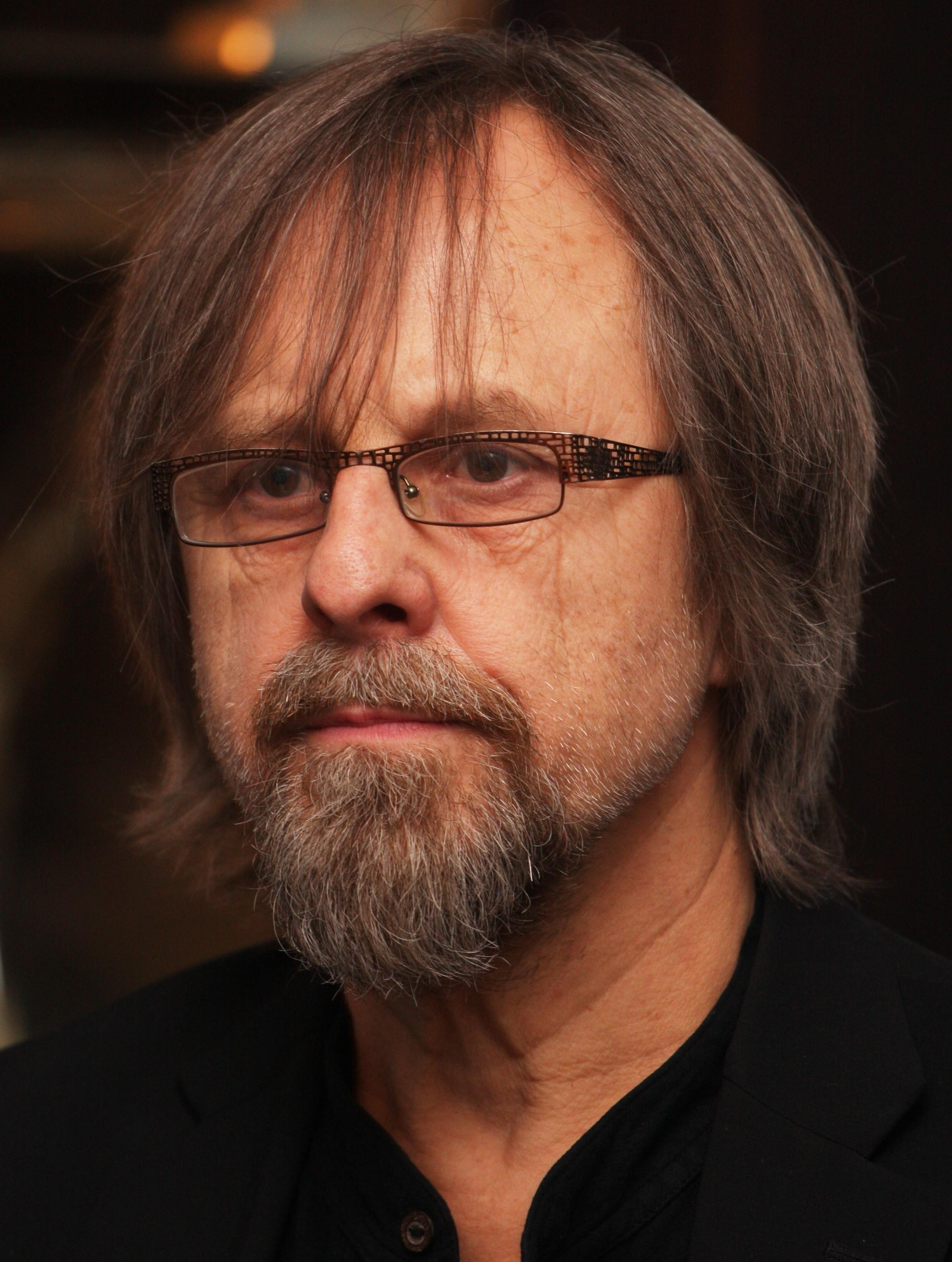
Jan A.P. Kaczmarek won for Finding Neverland (2004).

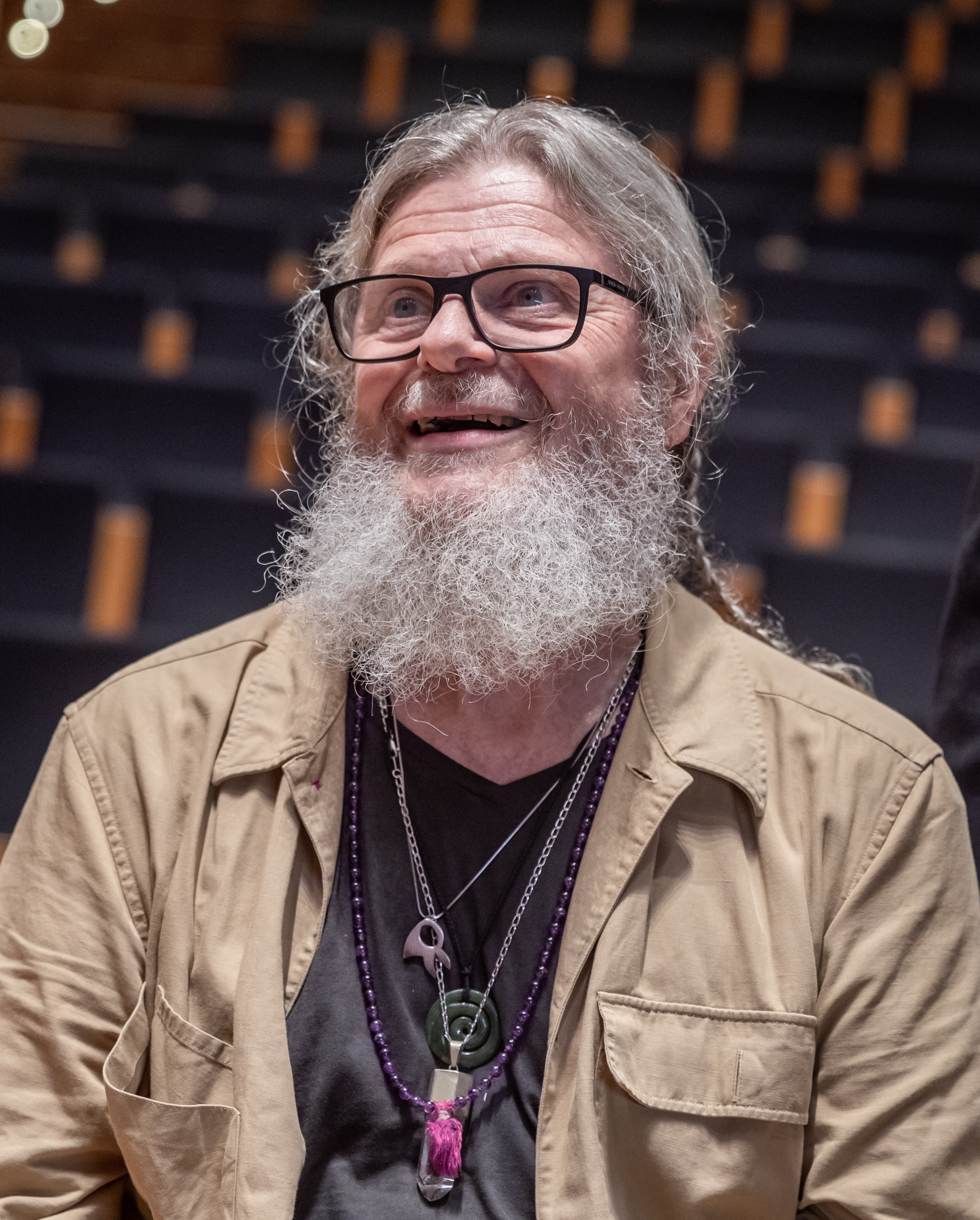
Gustavo Santaolalla won twice consecutively for Brokeback Mountain (2005) and Babel (2006).

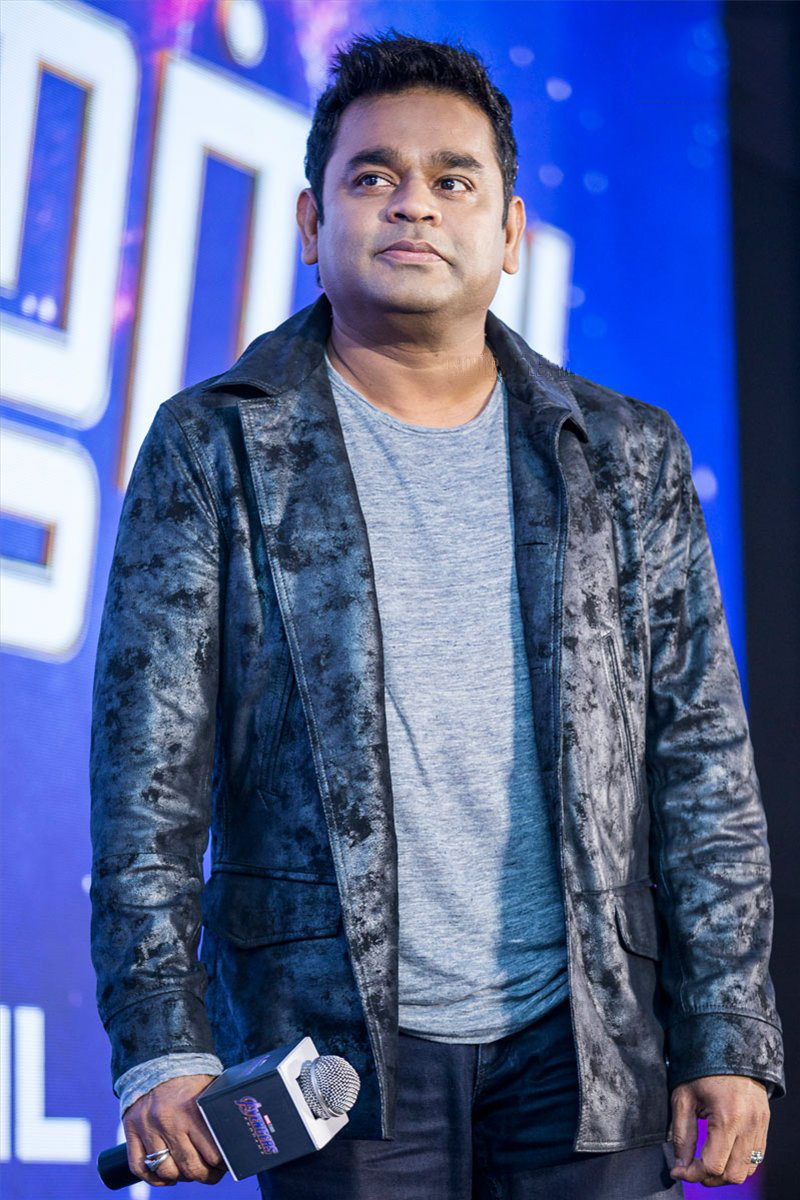
A.R. Rahman won for Slumdog Millionaire (2008).

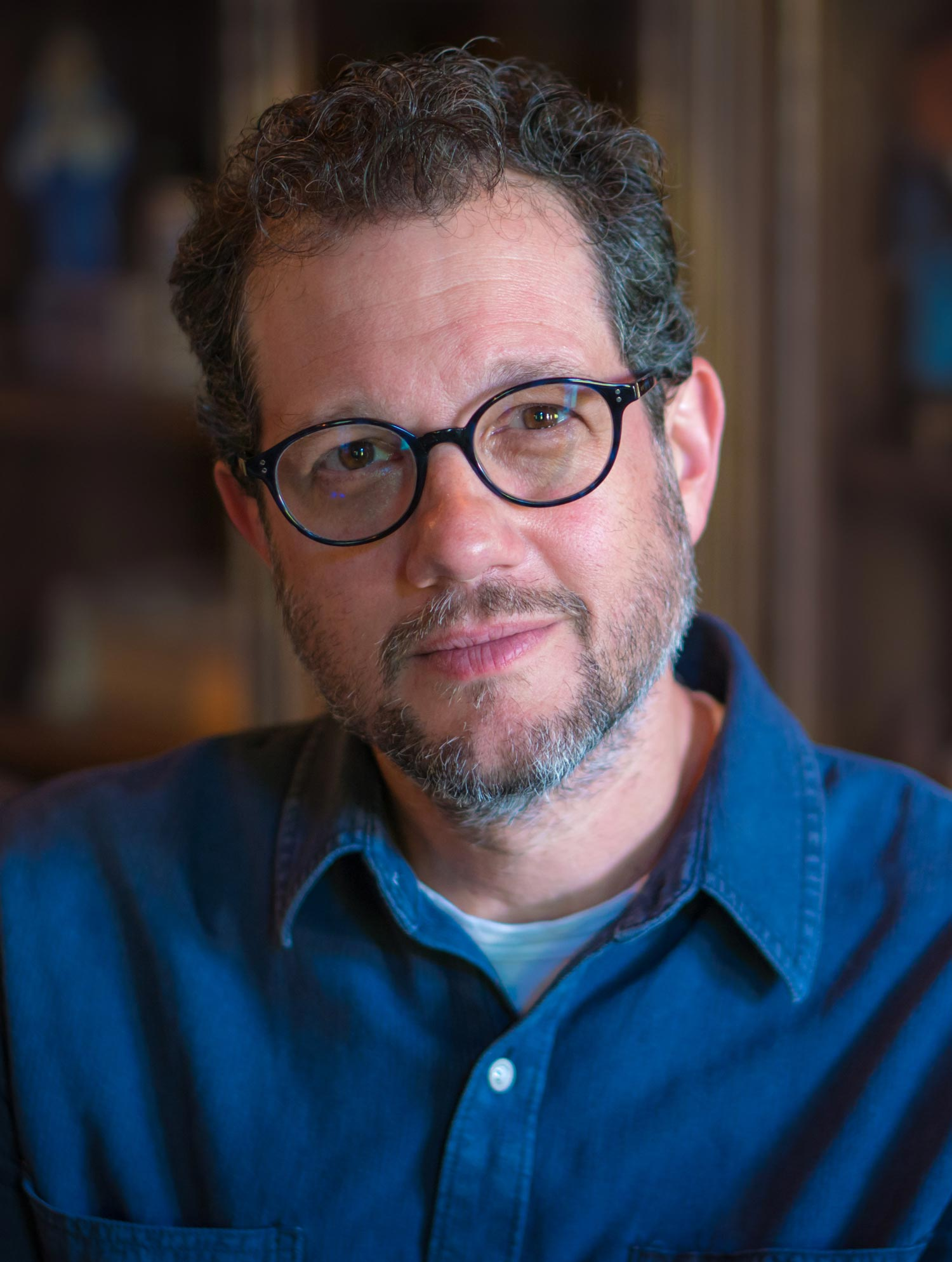
Michael Giacchino won for Up (2009).

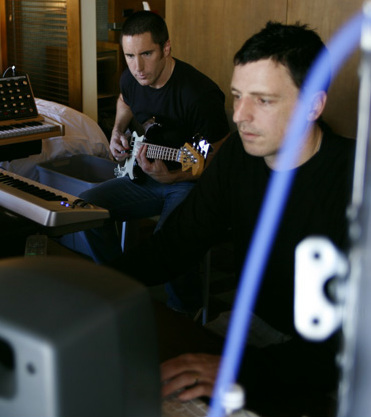
Trent Reznor and Atticus Ross won twice for The Social Network (2010) and Soul (2020).

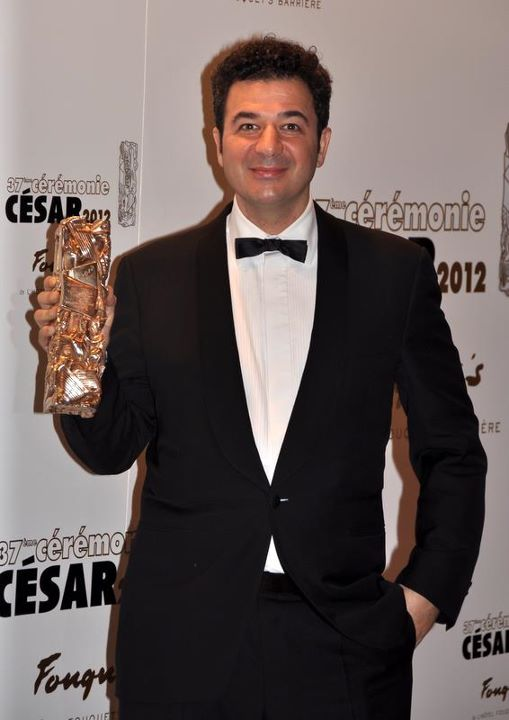
Ludovic Bource won for The Artist (2011).

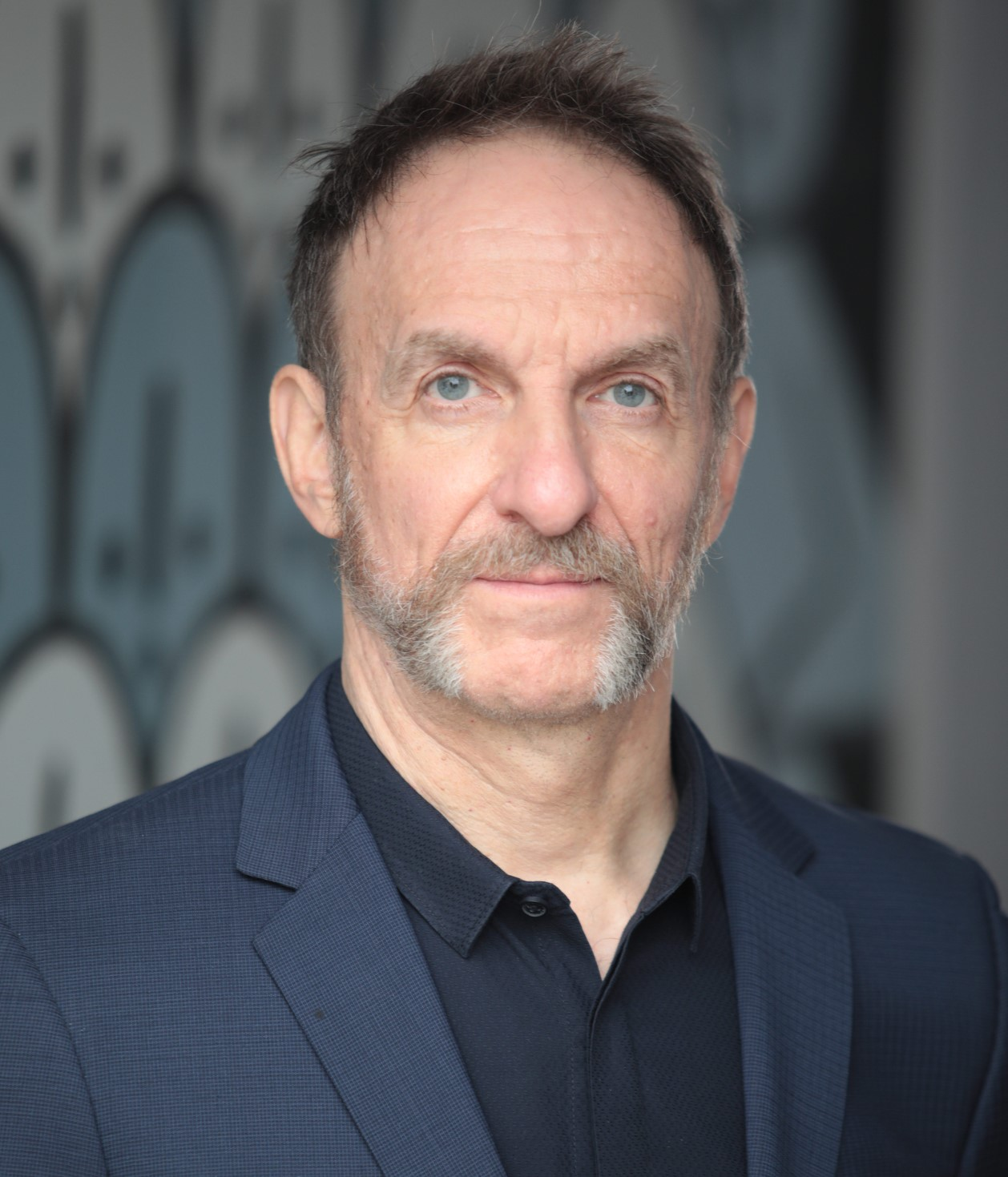
Mychael Danna won for Life of Pi (2012).

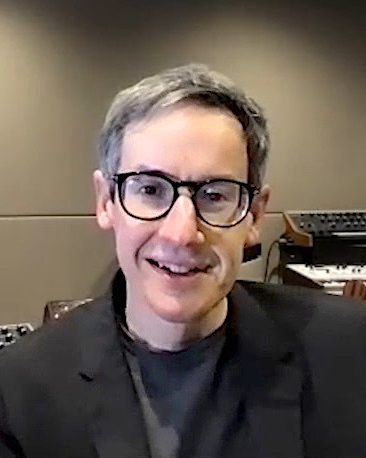
Steven Price won for Gravity (2013).

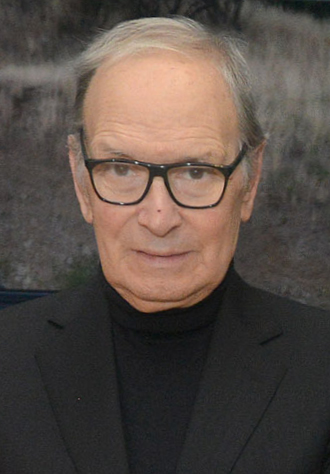
Ennio Morricone won for The Hateful Eight (2015).

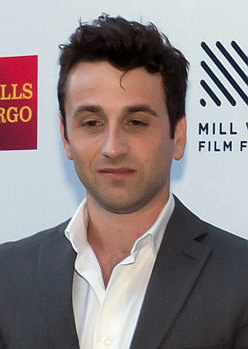
Justin Hurwitz won for La La Land (2016).

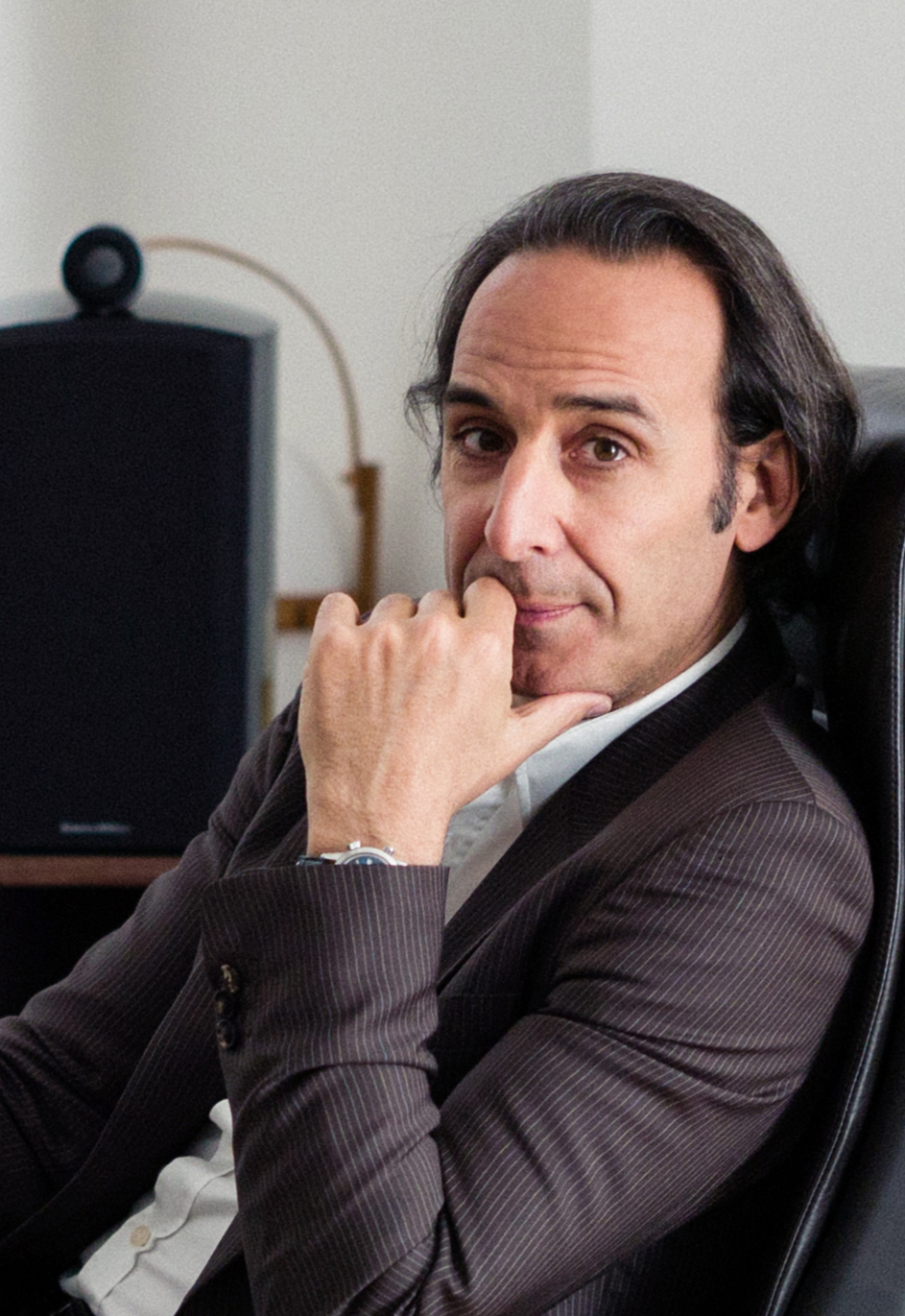
Alexandre Desplat won twice for The Grand Budapest Hotel (2014) and The Shape of Water (2017).

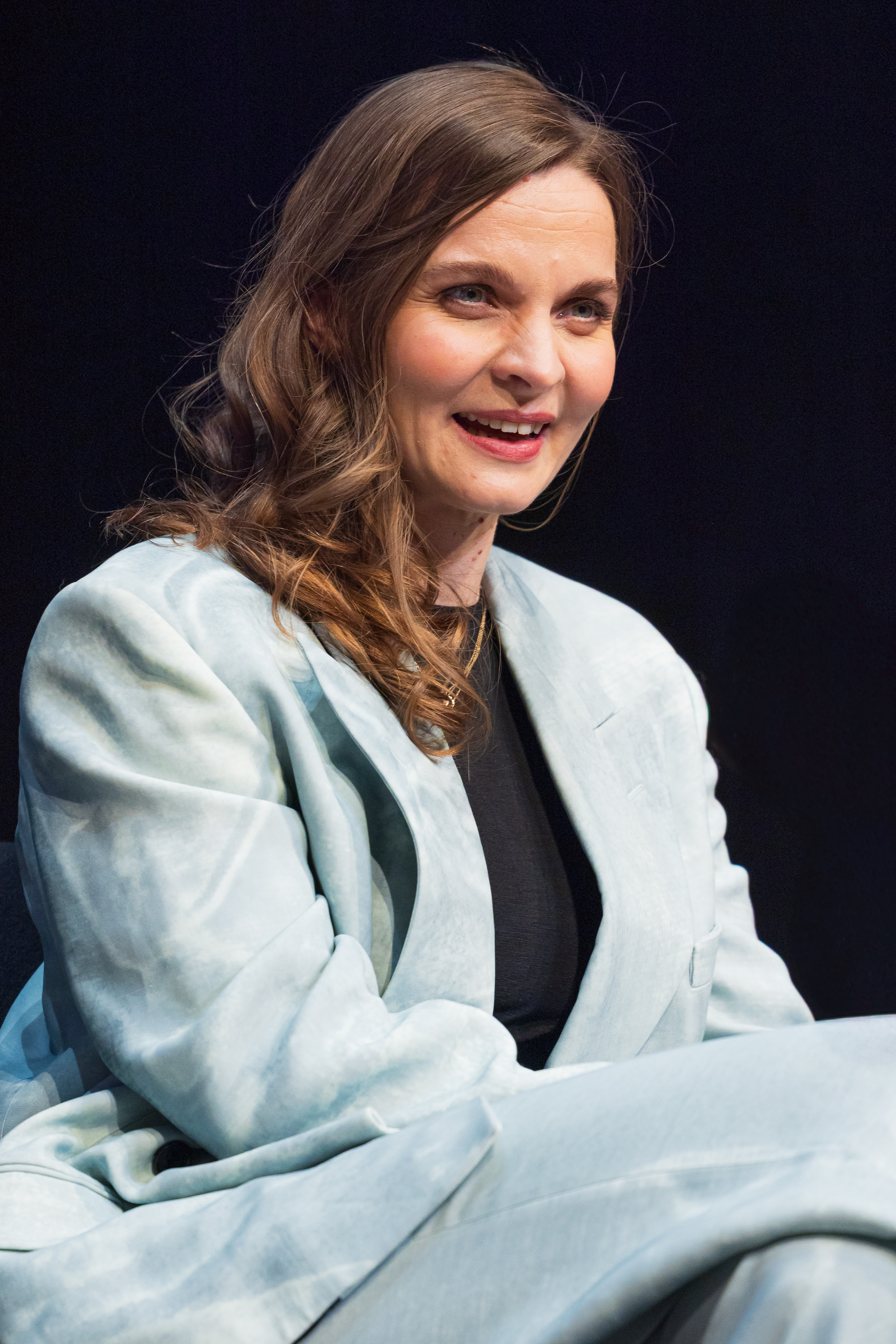
Hildur Guðnadóttir won for Joker (2019).

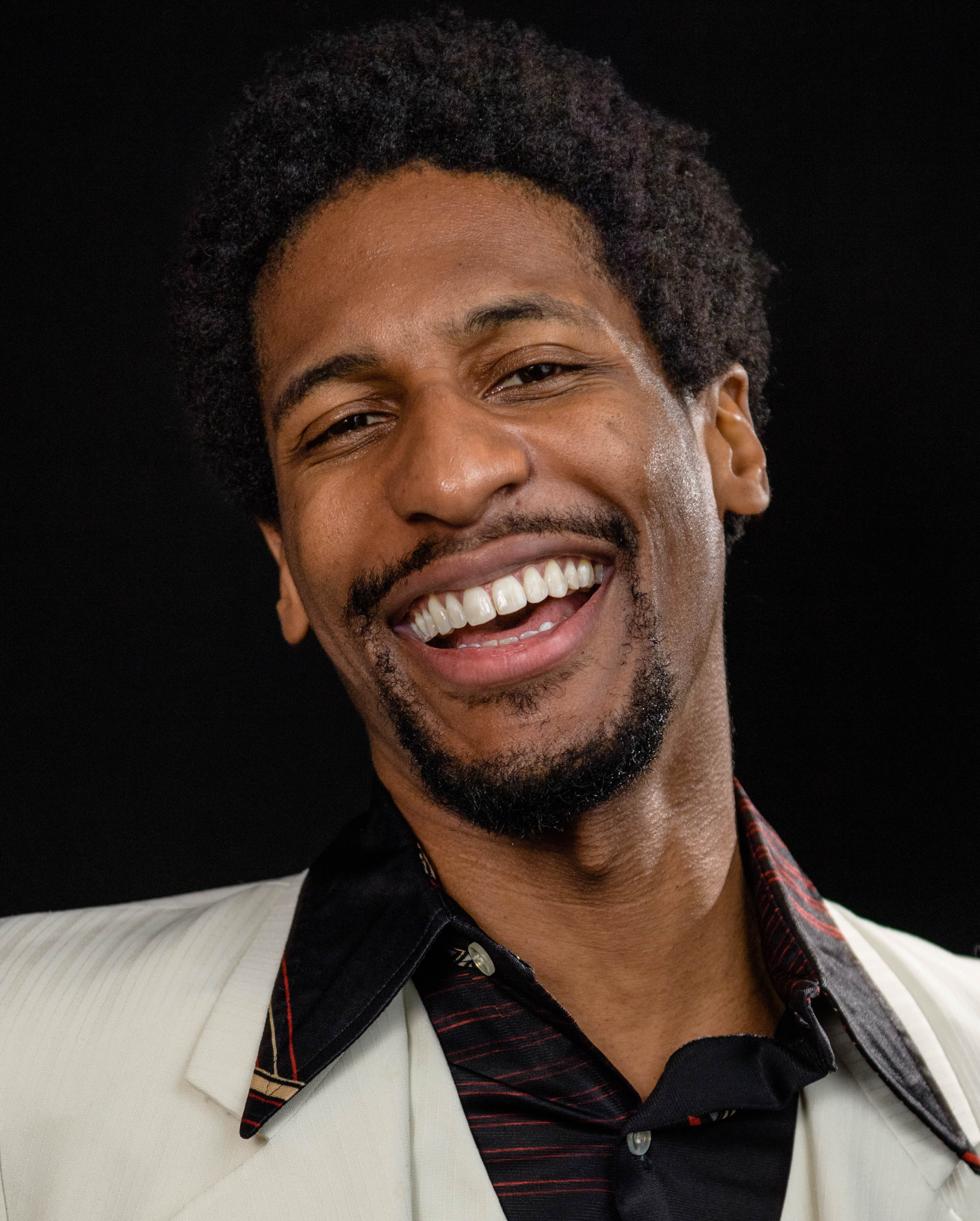
Jon Batiste won alongside Trent Reznor and Atticus Ross for Soul (2020).

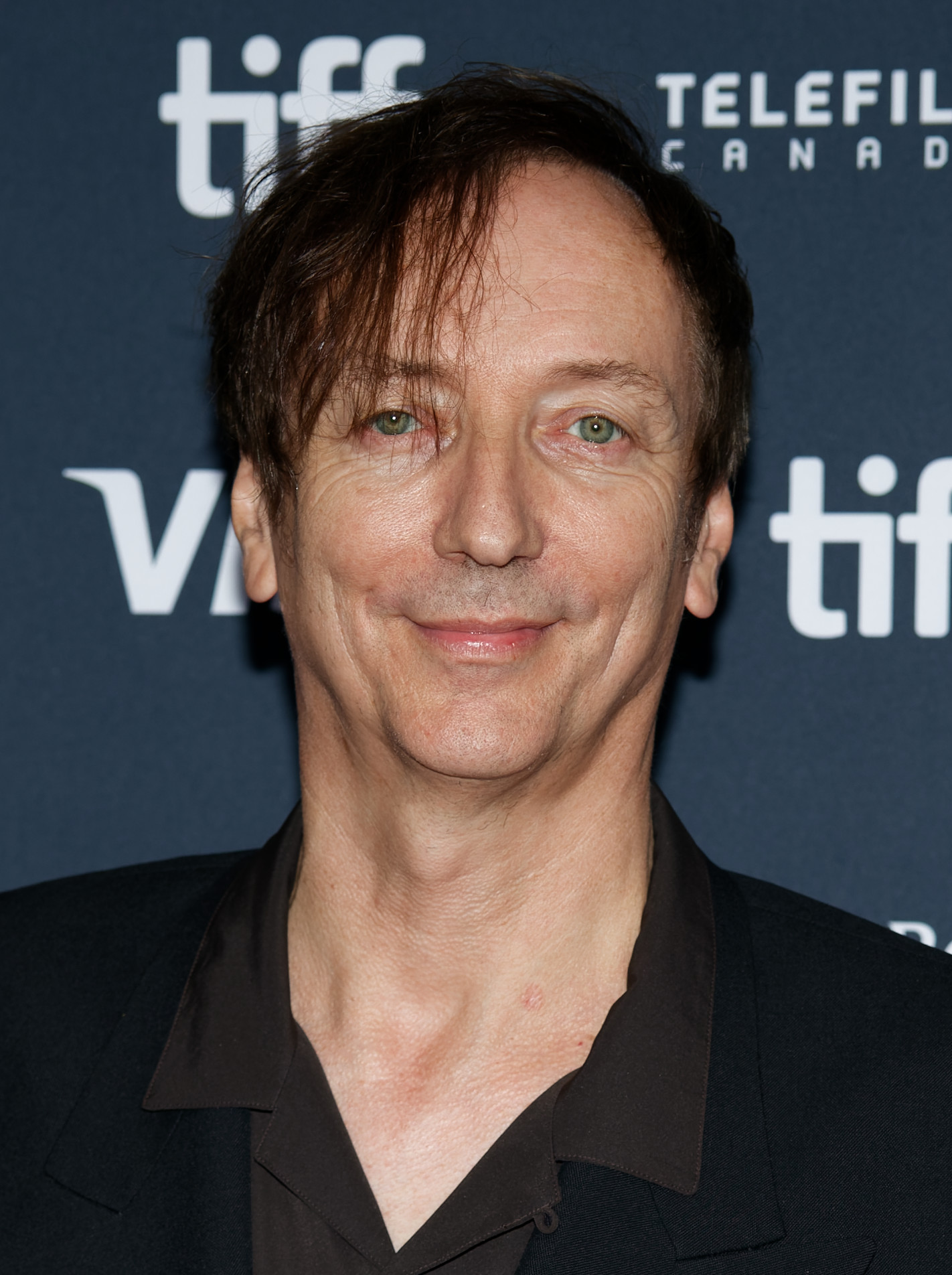
Volker Bertelmann won for All Quiet on the Western Front (2022).

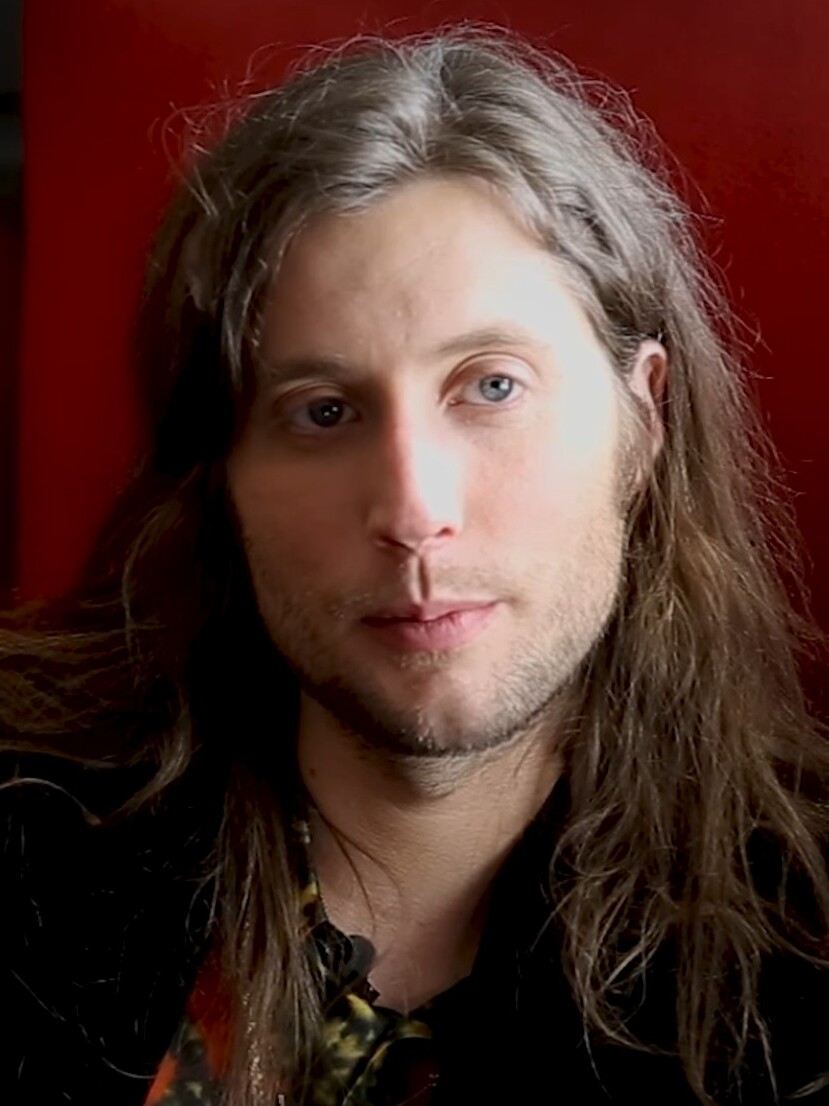
Ludwig Göransson won three times for Black Panther (2018), Oppenheimer (2023), and Sinners (2025).

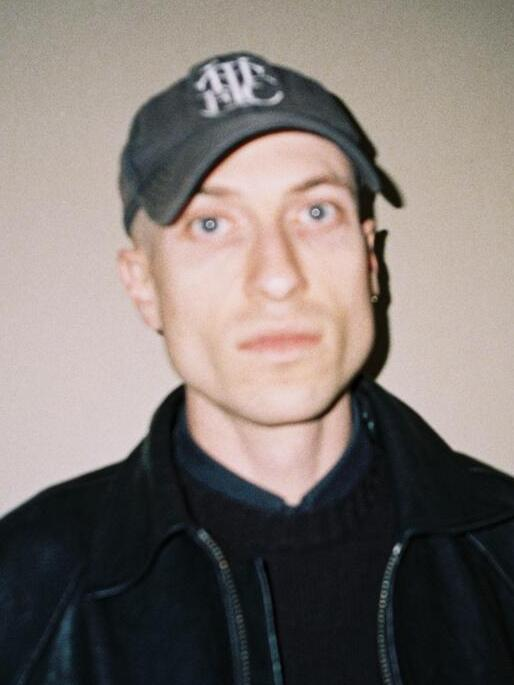
Daniel Blumberg won for The Brutalist (2024).

=== 1930s ===
Year	Film	Nominees
1934 (7th) (Note: From 1934 until 1937, nominated films were represented by the head of the film studio's music department rather than the composer. Each film's actual composer(s) are listed in parentheses.)	One Night of Love	Columbia Studio Music Department, Louis Silvers, head of department (Thematic music by Victor Schertzinger and Gus Kahn)
1934 (7th)	The Gay Divorcee	RKO Radio Studio Music Department, Max Steiner, head of department (Score by Kenneth Webb and Sam Hoffenstein)
1934 (7th)	The Lost Patrol	RKO Radio Studio Music Department, Steiner, head of department (Score by Steiner)
1935 (8th)
1935 (8th)	The Informer	RKO Radio Studio Music Department, Max Steiner, head of department (Score by Steiner)
1935 (8th)	Captain Blood (write-in) (Note: Captain Blood was not officially nominated for this award, but appears in Academy records because it placed third in voting as a write-in candidate in 1935.)	Warner Bros.-First National Studio Music Department, Leo F. Forbstein, head of department (Score by Erich Korngold)
1935 (8th)	Mutiny on the Bounty	Metro-Goldwyn-Mayer Studio Music Department, Nat W. Finston, head of department (Score by Herbert Stothart)
1935 (8th)	Peter Ibbetson	Paramount Studio Music Department, Irvin Talbot, head of department (Score by Ernst Toch)
1936 (9th)
1936 (9th)	Anthony Adverse	Warner Bros. Studio Music Department, Leo F. Forbstein, head of department (Score by Erich Korngold)
1936 (9th)	The Charge of the Light Brigade	Warner Bros. Studio Music Department, Forbstein, head of department (Score by Max Steiner)
1936 (9th)	The Garden of Allah	Selznick International Pictures Music Department, Steiner, head of department (Score by Steiner)
1936 (9th)	The General Died at Dawn	Paramount Studio Music Department, Boris Morros, head of department (Score by Werner Janssen)
1936 (9th)	Winterset	RKO Radio Studio Music Department, Nathaniel Shilkret, head of department (Score by Shilkret)
1937 (10th) (Note: From 1937 until 1945, film studios could submit one eligible film of their choosing, guaranteeing it a nomination.)
1937 (10th)	One Hundred Men and a Girl	Universal Studio Music Department, Charles Previn, head of department (no composer credit)
1937 (10th)	The Hurricane	Samuel Goldwyn Studio Music Department, Alfred Newman, head of department (Score by Newman)
1937 (10th)	In Old Chicago	20th Century-Fox Studio Music Department, Louis Silvers, head of department (no composer credit)
1937 (10th)	The Life of Emile Zola	Warner Bros. Studio Music Department, Leo F. Forbstein, head of department (Score by Max Steiner)
1937 (10th)	Lost Horizon	Columbia Studio Music Department, Morris Stoloff, head of department (Score by Dimitri Tiomkin)
1937 (10th)	Make a Wish	Principal Productions, Hugo Riesenfeld, head of department (Score by Riesenfeld)
1937 (10th)	Maytime	Metro-Goldwyn-Mayer Studio Music Department, Nat W. Finston, head of department (Score by Herbert Stothart)
1937 (10th)	Portia on Trial	Republic Studio Music Department, Alberto Colombo, head of department (Score by Colombo)
1937 (10th)	The Prisoner of Zenda	Selznick International Pictures Music Department, Alfred Newman, head of department (Score by Newman)
1937 (10th)	Quality Street	RKO Radio Studio Music Department, Roy Webb, head of department (Score by Webb)
1937 (10th)	Snow White and the Seven Dwarfs	Walt Disney Studio Music Department, Leigh Harline, head of department (Score by Frank Churchill, Harline and Paul Smith)
1937 (10th)	Something to Sing About	Grand National Studio Music Department, Constantin Bakaleinikoff, head of department (Score by Victor Schertzinger)
1937 (10th)	Souls at Sea	Paramount Studio Music Department, Boris Morros, head of department (Score by W. Franke Harling and Milan Roder)
1937 (10th)	Way Out West	Hal Roach Studio Music Department, Marvin Hatley, head of department (Score by Hatley)
1938 (11th)
1938 (11th)	Original Score	
1938 (11th)	The Adventures of Robin Hood	Erich Korngold
1938 (11th)	Army Girl	Victor Young
1938 (11th)	Block-Heads	Marvin Hatley
1938 (11th)	Blockade	Werner Janssen
1938 (11th)	Breaking the Ice	Victor Young
1938 (11th)	The Cowboy and the Lady	Alfred Newman
1938 (11th)	If I Were King	Richard Hageman
1938 (11th)	Marie Antoinette	Herbert Stothart
1938 (11th)	Pacific Liner	Russell Bennett
1938 (11th)	Suez	Louis Silvers
1938 (11th)	The Young in Heart	Franz Waxman
1938 (11th)	Scoring	
1938 (11th)	Alexander's Ragtime Band	Alfred Newman
1938 (11th)	Carefree	Victor Baravalle
1938 (11th)	Girls' School	Morris Stoloff and Gregory Stone
1938 (11th)	The Goldwyn Follies	Alfred Newman
1938 (11th)	Jezebel	Max Steiner
1938 (11th)	Mad About Music	Charles Previn and Frank Skinner
1938 (11th)	Storm Over Bengal	Cy Feuer
1938 (11th)	Sweethearts	Herbert Stothart
1938 (11th)	There Goes My Heart	Marvin Hatley
1938 (11th)	Tropic Holiday	Boris Morros
1938 (11th)	The Young in Heart	Franz Waxman
1939 (12th)
1939 (12th)	Original Score	
1939 (12th)	The Wizard of Oz	Herbert Stothart
1939 (12th)	Dark Victory	Max Steiner
1939 (12th)	Eternally Yours	Werner Janssen
1939 (12th)	Golden Boy	Victor Young
1939 (12th)	Gone with the Wind	Max Steiner
1939 (12th)	Gulliver's Travels	Victor Young
1939 (12th)	The Man in the Iron Mask	Lud Gluskin and Lucien Moraweck
1939 (12th)	Man of Conquest	Victor Young
1939 (12th)	Nurse Edith Cavell	Anthony Collins
1939 (12th)	Of Mice and Men	Aaron Copland
1939 (12th)	The Rains Came	Alfred Newman
1939 (12th)	Wuthering Heights	Alfred Newman
1939 (12th)	Scoring	
1939 (12th)	Stagecoach	Richard Hageman, W. Franke Harling, John Leipold and Leo Shuken
1939 (12th)	Babes in Arms	Roger Edens and Georgie Stoll
1939 (12th)	First Love	Charles Previn
1939 (12th)	The Great Victor Herbert	Phil Boutelje and Arthur Lange
1939 (12th)	The Hunchback of Notre Dame	Alfred Newman
1939 (12th)	Intermezzo	Louis Forbes
1939 (12th)	Mr. Smith Goes to Washington	Dimitri Tiomkin
1939 (12th)	Of Mice and Men	Aaron Copland
1939 (12th)	The Private Lives of Elizabeth and Essex	Erich Korngold
1939 (12th)	She Married a Cop	Cy Feuer
1939 (12th)	Swanee River	Louis Silvers
1939 (12th)	They Shall Have Music	Alfred Newman
1939 (12th)	Way Down South	Victor Young

=== 1940s ===
Year	Film	Nominees
1940 (13th)	Original Score	
1940 (13th)	Pinocchio	Leigh Harline, Paul Smith and Ned Washington
1940 (13th)	Arizona	Victor Young
1940 (13th)	Dark Command	Victor Young
1940 (13th)	The Fight for Life	Louis Gruenberg
1940 (13th)	The Great Dictator	Meredith Willson
1940 (13th)	The House of the Seven Gables	Frank Skinner
1940 (13th)	The Howards of Virginia	Richard Hageman
1940 (13th)	The Letter	Max Steiner
1940 (13th)	The Long Voyage Home	Richard Hageman
1940 (13th)	The Mark of Zorro	Alfred Newman
1940 (13th)	My Favorite Wife	Roy Webb
1940 (13th)	North West Mounted Police	Victor Young
1940 (13th)	One Million B.C.	Werner Heymann
1940 (13th)	Our Town	Aaron Copland
1940 (13th)	Rebecca	Franz Waxman
1940 (13th)	The Thief of Bagdad	Miklós Rózsa
1940 (13th)	Waterloo Bridge	Herbert Stothart
1940 (13th)	Scoring	
1940 (13th)	Tin Pan Alley	Alfred Newman
1940 (13th)	Arise, My Love	Victor Young
1940 (13th)	Hit Parade of 1941	Cy Feuer
1940 (13th)	Irene	Anthony Collins
1940 (13th)	Our Town	Aaron Copland
1940 (13th)	The Sea Hawk	Erich Korngold
1940 (13th)	Second Chorus	Artie Shaw
1940 (13th)	Spring Parade	Charles Previn
1940 (13th)	Strike Up the Band	Roger Edens and Georgie Stoll
1941 (14th)
1941 (14th)	Music Score of a Dramatic or Comedy Picture	
1941 (14th)	The Devil and Daniel Webster	Bernard Herrmann
1941 (14th)	Back Street	Frank Skinner
1941 (14th)	Ball of Fire	Alfred Newman
1941 (14th)	Cheers for Miss Bishop	Edward Ward
1941 (14th)	Citizen Kane	Bernard Herrmann
1941 (14th)	Dr. Jekyll and Mr. Hyde	Franz Waxman
1941 (14th)	Hold Back the Dawn	Victor Young
1941 (14th)	How Green Was My Valley	Alfred Newman
1941 (14th)	King of the Zombies	Edward Kay
1941 (14th)	Ladies in Retirement	Morris Stoloff and Ernst Toch
1941 (14th)	The Little Foxes	Meredith Willson
1941 (14th)	Lydia	Miklós Rózsa
1941 (14th)	Mercy Island	Cy Feuer and Walter Scharf
1941 (14th)	Sergeant York	Max Steiner
1941 (14th)	So Ends Our Night	Louis Gruenberg
1941 (14th)	Sundown	Miklós Rózsa
1941 (14th)	Suspicion	Franz Waxman
1941 (14th)	Tanks a Million	Edward Ward
1941 (14th)	That Uncertain Feeling	Werner Heymann
1941 (14th)	This Woman Is Mine	Richard Hageman
1941 (14th)	Scoring of a Musical Picture	
1941 (14th)	Dumbo	Frank Churchill and Oliver Wallace
1941 (14th)	All-American Co-Ed	Edward Ward
1941 (14th)	Birth of the Blues	Robert E. Dolan
1941 (14th)	Buck Privates	Charles Previn
1941 (14th)	The Chocolate Soldier	Herbert Stothart and Bronisław Kaper
1941 (14th)	Ice-Capades	Cy Feuer
1941 (14th)	The Strawberry Blonde	Heinz Roemheld
1941 (14th)	Sun Valley Serenade	Emil Newman
1941 (14th)	Sunny	Anthony Collins
1941 (14th)	You'll Never Get Rich	Morris Stoloff
1942 (15th)
1942 (15th)	Music Score of a Dramatic or Comedy Picture	
1942 (15th)	Now, Voyager	Max Steiner
1942 (15th)	Arabian Nights	Frank Skinner
1942 (15th)	Bambi	Frank Churchill (p.n.) and Edward Plumb
1942 (15th)	The Black Swan	Alfred Newman
1942 (15th)	The Corsican Brothers	Dimitri Tiomkin
1942 (15th)	Flying Tigers	Victor Young
1942 (15th)	The Gold Rush	Max Terr
1942 (15th)	I Married a Witch	Roy Webb
1942 (15th)	Joan of Paris	Roy Webb
1942 (15th)	Jungle Book	Miklós Rózsa
1942 (15th)	Klondike Fury	Edward Kay
1942 (15th)	The Pride of the Yankees	Leigh Harline
1942 (15th)	Random Harvest	Herbert Stothart
1942 (15th)	The Shanghai Gesture	Richard Hageman
1942 (15th)	Silver Queen	Victor Young
1942 (15th)	Take a Letter, Darling	Victor Young
1942 (15th)	The Talk of the Town	Friedrich Hollaender and Morris Stoloff
1942 (15th)	To Be or Not to Be	Werner Heymann
1942 (15th)	Scoring of a Musical Picture	
1942 (15th)	Yankee Doodle Dandy	Ray Heindorf and Heinz Roemheld
1942 (15th)	Flying with Music	Edward Ward
1942 (15th)	For Me and My Gal	Roger Edens and Georgie Stoll
1942 (15th)	Holiday Inn	Robert E. Dolan
1942 (15th)	It Started with Eve	Hans J. Salter and Charles Previn
1942 (15th)	Johnny Doughboy	Walter Scharf
1942 (15th)	My Gal Sal	Alfred Newman
1942 (15th)	You Were Never Lovelier	Leigh Harline
1943 (16th)
1943 (16th)	Music Score of a Dramatic or Comedy Picture	
1943 (16th)	The Song of Bernadette	Alfred Newman
1943 (16th)	The Amazing Mrs. Holliday	Frank Skinner and Hans J. Salter
1943 (16th)	Casablanca	Max Steiner
1943 (16th)	Commandos Strike at Dawn	Morris Stoloff and Louis Gruenberg
1943 (16th)	The Fallen Sparrow	Roy Webb and Constantin Bakaleinikoff
1943 (16th)	For Whom the Bell Tolls	Victor Young
1943 (16th)	Hangmen Also Die!	Hanns Eisler
1943 (16th)	Hi Diddle Diddle	Phil Boutelje
1943 (16th)	In Old Oklahoma	Walter Scharf
1943 (16th)	Johnny Come Lately	Leigh Harline
1943 (16th)	The Kansan	Gerard Carbonara
1943 (16th)	Lady of Burlesque	Arthur Lange
1943 (16th)	Madame Curie	Herbert Stothart
1943 (16th)	The Moon and Sixpence	Dimitri Tiomkin
1943 (16th)	The North Star	Aaron Copland
1943 (16th)	Victory Through Air Power	Edward Plumb, Paul Smith and Oliver Wallace
1943 (16th)	Scoring of a Musical Picture	
1943 (16th)	This Is the Army	Ray Heindorf
1943 (16th)	Coney Island	Alfred Newman
1943 (16th)	Hit Parade of 1943	Walter Scharf
1943 (16th)	Phantom of the Opera	Edward Ward
1943 (16th)	Saludos Amigos	Edward Plumb, Paul Smith and Charles Wolcott
1943 (16th)	The Sky's the Limit	Leigh Harline
1943 (16th)	Something to Shout About	Morris Stoloff
1943 (16th)	Stage Door Canteen	Fred Rich
1943 (16th)	Star Spangled Rhythm	Robert E. Dolan
1943 (16th)	Thousands Cheer	Herbert P. Stothart
1944 (17th)
1944 (17th)	Music Score of a Dramatic or Comedy Picture	
1944 (17th)	Since You Went Away	Max Steiner
1944 (17th)	Address Unknown	Morris Stoloff and Ernst Toch
1944 (17th)	The Adventures of Mark Twain	Max Steiner
1944 (17th)	The Bridge of San Luis Rey	Dimitri Tiomkin
1944 (17th)	Casanova Brown	Arthur Lange
1944 (17th)	Christmas Holiday	Hans J. Salter
1944 (17th)	Double Indemnity	Miklós Rózsa
1944 (17th)	The Fighting Seabees	Walter Scharf and Roy Webb
1944 (17th)	The Hairy Ape	Michel Michelet and Edward Paul
1944 (17th)	It Happened Tomorrow	Robert Stolz
1944 (17th)	Jack London	Fred Rich
1944 (17th)	Kismet	Herbert Stothart
1944 (17th)	None but the Lonely Heart	Constantin Bakaleinikoff and Hanns Eisler
1944 (17th)	The Princess and the Pirate	David Rose
1944 (17th)	Summer Storm	Karl Hajos
1944 (17th)	Three Russian Girls	Franke Harling
1944 (17th)	Up in Mabel's Room	Edward Paul
1944 (17th)	Voice in the Wind	Michel Michelet
1944 (17th)	Wilson	Alfred Newman
1944 (17th)	The Woman of the Town	Miklós Rózsa
1944 (17th)	Scoring of a Musical Picture	
1944 (17th)	Cover Girl	Morris Stoloff and Carmen Dragon
1944 (17th)	Brazil	Walter Scharf
1944 (17th)	Higher and Higher	Constantin Bakaleinikoff
1944 (17th)	Hollywood Canteen	Ray Heindorf
1944 (17th)	Irish Eyes Are Smiling	Alfred Newman
1944 (17th)	Knickerbocker Holiday	Werner Heymann and Kurt Weill
1944 (17th)	Lady in the Dark	Robert Emmett Dolan
1944 (17th)	Lady, Let's Dance	Edward Kay
1944 (17th)	Meet Me in St. Louis	Georgie Stoll
1944 (17th)	The Merry Monahans	Hans J. Salter
1944 (17th)	Minstrel Man	Ferde Grofé and Leo Erdody
1944 (17th)	Sensations of 1945	Mahlon Merrick
1944 (17th)	Song of the Open Road	Charles Previn
1944 (17th)	Up in Arms	Louis Forbes and Ray Heindorf
1945 (18th)
1945 (18th)	Music Score of a Dramatic or Comedy Picture	
1945 (18th)	Spellbound	Miklós Rózsa
1945 (18th)	The Bells of St. Mary's	Robert E. Dolan
1945 (18th)	Brewster's Millions	Louis Forbes
1945 (18th)	Captain Kidd	Werner Janssen
1945 (18th)	The Enchanted Cottage	Roy Webb
1945 (18th)	Flame of Barbary Coast	Morton Scott and Dale Butts
1945 (18th)	G. I. Honeymoon	Edward J. Kay
1945 (18th)	G. I. Joe	Louis Applebaum and Ann Ronell
1945 (18th)	Guest in the House	Werner Janssen
1945 (18th)	Guest Wife	Daniele Amfitheatrof
1945 (18th)	The Keys of the Kingdom	Alfred Newman
1945 (18th)	The Lost Weekend	Miklós Rózsa
1945 (18th)	Love Letters	Victor Young
1945 (18th)	The Man Who Walked Alone	Karl Hajos
1945 (18th)	Objective, Burma!	Franz Waxman
1945 (18th)	Paris Underground	Alexandre Tansman
1945 (18th)	A Song to Remember	Miklós Rózsa and Morris Stoloff
1945 (18th)	The Southerner	Werner Janssen
1945 (18th)	This Love of Ours	Hans J. Salter
1945 (18th)	The Valley of Decision	Herbert Stothart
1945 (18th)	The Woman in the Window	Arthur Lange and Hugo Friedhofer
1945 (18th)	Scoring of a Musical Picture	
1945 (18th)	Anchors Aweigh	Georgie Stoll
1945 (18th)	Belle of the Yukon	Arthur Lange
1945 (18th)	Can't Help Singing	Jerome Kern (p.n.) and Hans J. Salter
1945 (18th)	Hitchhike to Happiness	Morton Scott
1945 (18th)	Incendiary Blonde	Robert E. Dolan
1945 (18th)	Rhapsody in Blue	Ray Heindorf and Max Steiner
1945 (18th)	State Fair	Alfred Newman and Charles Henderson
1945 (18th)	Sunbonnet Sue	Edward J. Kay
1945 (18th)	The Three Caballeros	Edward Plumb, Paul Smith and Charles Wolcott
1945 (18th)	Tonight and Every Night	Marlin Skiles and Morris Stoloff
1945 (18th)	Why Girls Leave Home	Walter Greene
1945 (18th)	Wonder Man	Louis Forbes and Ray Heindorf
1946 (19th)
1946 (19th)	Music Score of a Dramatic or Comedy Picture	
1946 (19th)	The Best Years of Our Lives	Hugo Friedhofer
1946 (19th)	Anna and the King of Siam	Bernard Herrmann
1946 (19th)	Henry V	William Walton
1946 (19th)	Humoresque	Franz Waxman
1946 (19th)	The Killers	Miklós Rózsa
1946 (19th)	Scoring of a Musical Picture	
1946 (19th)	The Jolson Story	Morris Stoloff
1946 (19th)	Blue Skies	Robert Emmett Dolan
1946 (19th)	Centennial Summer	Alfred Newman
1946 (19th)	The Harvey Girls	Lennie Hayton
1946 (19th)	Night and Day	Ray Heindorf and Max Steiner
1947 (20th)
1947 (20th)	Music Score of a Dramatic or Comedy Picture	
1947 (20th)	A Double Life	Miklós Rózsa
1947 (20th)	The Bishop's Wife	Hugo Friedhofer
1947 (20th)	Captain from Castile	Alfred Newman
1947 (20th)	Forever Amber	David Raksin
1947 (20th)	Life with Father	Max Steiner
1947 (20th)	Scoring of a Musical Picture	
1947 (20th)	Mother Wore Tights	Alfred Newman
1947 (20th)	Fiesta	Johnny Green
1947 (20th)	My Wild Irish Rose	Ray Heindorf and Max Steiner
1947 (20th)	Road to Rio	Robert Emmett Dolan
1947 (20th)	Song of the South	Daniele Amfitheatrof, Paul Smith and Charles Wolcott
1948 (21st)
1948 (21st)	Music Score of a Dramatic or Comedy Picture	
1948 (21st)	The Red Shoes	Brian Easdale
1948 (21st)	Hamlet	William Walton
1948 (21st)	Joan of Arc	Hugo Friedhofer
1948 (21st)	Johnny Belinda	Max Steiner
1948 (21st)	The Snake Pit	Alfred Newman
1948 (21st)	Scoring of a Musical Picture	
1948 (21st)	Easter Parade	Johnny Green and Roger Edens
1948 (21st)	The Emperor Waltz	Victor Young
1948 (21st)	The Pirate	Lennie Hayton
1948 (21st)	Romance on the High Seas	Ray Heindorf
1948 (21st)	When My Baby Smiles at Me	Alfred Newman
1949 (22nd)
1949 (22nd)	Music Score of a Dramatic or Comedy Picture	
1949 (22nd)	The Heiress	Aaron Copland
1949 (22nd)	Beyond the Forest	Max Steiner
1949 (22nd)	Champion	Dimitri Tiomkin
1949 (22nd)	Scoring of a Musical Picture	
1949 (22nd)	On the Town	Roger Edens and Lennie Hayton
1949 (22nd)	Jolson Sings Again	Morris Stoloff and George Duning
1949 (22nd)	Look for the Silver Lining	Ray Heindorf

=== 1950s ===
Year	Film	Nominees
1950 (23rd)	Music Score of a Dramatic or Comedy Picture	
1950 (23rd)	Sunset Boulevard	Franz Waxman
1950 (23rd)	All About Eve	Alfred Newman
1950 (23rd)	The Flame and the Arrow	Max Steiner
1950 (23rd)	No Sad Songs for Me	George Duning
1950 (23rd)	Samson and Delilah	Victor Young
1950 (23rd)	Scoring of a Musical Picture	
1950 (23rd)	Annie Get Your Gun	Adolph Deutsch and Roger Edens
1950 (23rd)	Cinderella	Paul Smith and Oliver Wallace
1950 (23rd)	I'll Get By	Lionel Newman
1950 (23rd)	Three Little Words	André Previn
1950 (23rd)	The West Point Story	Ray Heindorf
1951 (24th)
1951 (24th)	Music Score of a Dramatic or Comedy Picture	
1951 (24th)	A Place in the Sun	Franz Waxman
1951 (24th)	David and Bathsheba	Alfred Newman
1951 (24th)	Death of a Salesman	Alex North
1951 (24th)	Quo Vadis	Miklós Rózsa
1951 (24th)	A Streetcar Named Desire	Alex North
1951 (24th)	Scoring of a Musical Picture	
1951 (24th)	An American in Paris	Saul Chaplin and Johnny Green
1951 (24th)	Alice in Wonderland	Oliver Wallace
1951 (24th)	The Great Caruso	Peter Herman Adler and Johnny Green
1951 (24th)	On the Riviera	Alfred Newman
1951 (24th)	Show Boat	Adolph Deutsch and Conrad Salinger
1952 (25th)
1952 (25th)	Music Score of a Dramatic or Comedy Picture	
1952 (25th)	High Noon	Dimitri Tiomkin
1952 (25th)	Ivanhoe	Miklós Rózsa
1952 (25th)	The Miracle of Our Lady of Fatima	Max Steiner
1952 (25th)	The Thief	Herschel Burke Gilbert
1952 (25th)	Viva Zapata!	Alex North
1952 (25th)	Scoring of a Musical Picture	
1952 (25th)	With a Song in My Heart	Alfred Newman
1952 (25th)	Hans Christian Andersen	Walter Scharf
1952 (25th)	The Jazz Singer	Ray Heindorf and Max Steiner
1952 (25th)	The Medium	Gian Carlo Menotti
1952 (25th)	Singin' in the Rain	Lennie Hayton
1953 (26th)
1953 (26th)	Music Score of a Dramatic or Comedy Picture	
1953 (26th)	Lili	Bronisław Kaper
1953 (26th)	Above and Beyond	Hugo Friedhofer
1953 (26th)	From Here to Eternity	George Duning and Morris Stoloff
1953 (26th)	Julius Caesar	Miklós Rózsa
1953 (26th)	This Is Cinerama	Louis Forbes
1953 (26th)	Scoring of a Musical Picture	
1953 (26th)	Call Me Madam	Alfred Newman
1953 (26th)	The 5,000 Fingers of Dr. T.	Friedrich Hollaender and Morris Stoloff
1953 (26th)	The Band Wagon	Adolph Deutsch
1953 (26th)	Calamity Jane	Ray Heindorf
1953 (26th)	Kiss Me Kate	Saul Chaplin and André Previn
1954 (27th)
1954 (27th)	Music Score of a Dramatic or Comedy Picture	
1954 (27th)	The High and the Mighty	Dimitri Tiomkin
1954 (27th)	The Caine Mutiny	Max Steiner
1954 (27th)	Genevieve	Larry Adler (Note: Blacklisted composer Larry Adler's name was removed from American prints of the British-made Genevieve. The film's arranger and orchestrator Muir Mathieson was credited instead and received an Oscar nomination. In 1986, the Academy's Board of Governors removed Mathieson's name from the nomination and gave it to Adler.)
1954 (27th)	On the Waterfront	Leonard Bernstein
1954 (27th)	The Silver Chalice	Franz Waxman
1954 (27th)	Scoring of a Musical Picture	
1954 (27th)	Seven Brides for Seven Brothers	Saul Chaplin and Adolph Deutsch
1954 (27th)	Carmen Jones	Herschel Burke Gilbert
1954 (27th)	The Glenn Miller Story	Joseph Gershenson and Henry Mancini
1954 (27th)	A Star Is Born	Ray Heindorf
1954 (27th)	There's No Business Like Show Business	Alfred Newman and Lionel Newman
1955 (28th)
1955 (28th)	Music Score of a Dramatic or Comedy Picture	
1955 (28th)	Love Is a Many-Splendored Thing	Alfred Newman
1955 (28th)	Battle Cry	Max Steiner
1955 (28th)	The Man with the Golden Arm	Elmer Bernstein
1955 (28th)	Picnic	George Duning
1955 (28th)	The Rose Tattoo	Alex North
1955 (28th)	Scoring of a Musical Picture	
1955 (28th)	Oklahoma!	Robert Russell Bennett, Jay Blackton and Adolph Deutsch
1955 (28th)	Daddy Long Legs	Alfred Newman
1955 (28th)	Guys and Dolls	Jay Blackton and Cyril J. Mockridge
1955 (28th)	It's Always Fair Weather	André Previn
1955 (28th)	Love Me or Leave Me	Percy Faith and Georgie Stoll
1956 (29th)
1956 (29th)	Music Score of a Dramatic or Comedy Picture	
1956 (29th)	Around the World in 80 Days	Victor Young (p.r.)
1956 (29th)	Anastasia	Alfred Newman
1956 (29th)	Between Heaven and Hell	Hugo Friedhofer
1956 (29th)	Giant	Dimitri Tiomkin
1956 (29th)	The Rainmaker	Alex North
1956 (29th)	Scoring of a Musical Picture	
1956 (29th)	The King and I	Ken Darby and Newman
1956 (29th)	The Best Things in Life Are Free	Lionel Newman
1956 (29th)	The Eddy Duchin Story	George Duning and Morris Stoloff
1956 (29th)	High Society	Saul Chaplin and Johnny Green
1956 (29th)	Meet Me in Las Vegas	Johnny Green and Georgie Stoll
1957 (30th) (Note: In 1957, dramatic and comedy films competed with musicals in a combined category called Music – Scoring. Fifteen scores were shortlisted with ten from dramatic and comedy films and five from musicals. Voting resulted in no musical nominees.)
1957 (30th)	The Bridge on the River Kwai	Malcolm Arnold
1957 (30th)	An Affair to Remember	Hugo Friedhofer
1957 (30th)	Boy on a Dolphin	Hugo Friedhofer
1957 (30th)	Perri	Paul Smith
1957 (30th)	Raintree County	Johnny Green
1958 (31st)
1958 (31st)	Music Score of a Dramatic or Comedy Picture	
1958 (31st)	The Old Man and the Sea	Dimitri Tiomkin
1958 (31st)	The Big Country	Jerome Moross
1958 (31st)	Separate Tables	David Raksin
1958 (31st)	White Wilderness	Oliver Wallace
1958 (31st)	The Young Lions	Hugo Friedhofer
1958 (31st)	Scoring of a Musical Picture	
1958 (31st)	Gigi	André Previn
1958 (31st)	The Bolshoi Ballet	Yuri Fayer and Gennady Rozhdestvensky
1958 (31st)	Damn Yankees	Ray Heindorf
1958 (31st)	Mardi Gras	Lionel Newman
1958 (31st)	South Pacific	Ken Darby and Alfred Newman
1959 (32nd)
1959 (32nd)	Music Score of a Dramatic or Comedy Picture	
1959 (32nd)	Ben-Hur	Miklós Rózsa
1959 (32nd)	The Diary of Anne Frank	Alfred Newman
1959 (32nd)	The Nun's Story	Franz Waxman
1959 (32nd)	On the Beach	Ernest Gold
1959 (32nd)	Pillow Talk	Frank De Vol
1959 (32nd)	Scoring of a Musical Picture	
1959 (32nd)	Porgy and Bess	Ken Darby and André Previn
1959 (32nd)	The Five Pennies	Leith Stevens
1959 (32nd)	Li'l Abner	Joseph J. Lilley and Nelson Riddle
1959 (32nd)	Say One for Me	Lionel Newman
1959 (32nd)	Sleeping Beauty	George Bruns

=== 1960s ===
Year	Film	Nominees
1960 (33rd)	Music Score of a Dramatic or Comedy Picture	
1960 (33rd)	Exodus	Ernest Gold
1960 (33rd)	The Alamo	Dimitri Tiomkin
1960 (33rd)	Elmer Gantry	André Previn
1960 (33rd)	The Magnificent Seven	Elmer Bernstein
1960 (33rd)	Spartacus	Alex North
1960 (33rd)	Scoring of a Musical Picture	
1960 (33rd)	Song Without End	Morris Stoloff and Harry Sukman
1960 (33rd)	Bells Are Ringing	André Previn
1960 (33rd)	Can-Can	Nelson Riddle
1960 (33rd)	Let's Make Love	Earle Hagen and Lionel Newman
1960 (33rd)	Pepe	Johnny Green
1961 (34th)
1961 (34th)	Music Score of a Dramatic or Comedy Picture	
1961 (34th)	Breakfast at Tiffany's	Henry Mancini
1961 (34th)	El Cid	Miklós Rózsa
1961 (34th)	Fanny	Morris Stoloff and Harry Sukman
1961 (34th)	The Guns of Navarone	Dimitri Tiomkin
1961 (34th)	Summer and Smoke	Elmer Bernstein
1961 (34th)	Scoring of a Musical Picture	
1961 (34th)	West Side Story	Saul Chaplin, Johnny Green, Irwin Kostal and Sid Ramin
1961 (34th)	Babes in Toyland	George Bruns
1961 (34th)	Flower Drum Song	Alfred Newman and Ken Darby
1961 (34th)	Khovanshchina	Dmitri Shostakovich
1961 (34th)	Paris Blues	Duke Ellington
1962 (35th)
1962 (35th)	Music Score — Substantially Original	
1962 (35th)	Lawrence of Arabia	Maurice Jarre
1962 (35th)	Freud	Jerry Goldsmith
1962 (35th)	Mutiny on the Bounty	Bronisław Kaper
1962 (35th)	Taras Bulba	Franz Waxman
1962 (35th)	To Kill a Mockingbird	Elmer Bernstein
1962 (35th)	Scoring of Music — Adaptation or Treatment	
1962 (35th)	The Music Man	Ray Heindorf
1962 (35th)	Billy Rose's Jumbo	Georgie Stoll
1962 (35th)	Gigot	Michel Magne
1962 (35th)	Gypsy	Frank Perkins
1962 (35th)	The Wonderful World of the Brothers Grimm	Leigh Harline
1963 (36th)
1963 (36th)	Music Score — Substantially Original	
1963 (36th)	Tom Jones	John Addison
1963 (36th)	55 Days at Peking	Dimitri Tiomkin
1963 (36th)	Cleopatra	Alex North
1963 (36th)	How the West Was Won	Alfred Newman and Ken Darby
1963 (36th)	It's a Mad, Mad, Mad, Mad World	Ernest Gold
1963 (36th)	Scoring of Music — Adaptation or Treatment	
1963 (36th)	Irma la Douce	André Previn
1963 (36th)	Bye Bye Birdie	Johnny Green
1963 (36th)	A New Kind of Love	Leith Stevens
1963 (36th)	Sundays and Cybele	Maurice Jarre
1963 (36th)	The Sword in the Stone	George Bruns
1964 (37th)
1964 (37th)	Music Score — Substantially Original	
1964 (37th)	Mary Poppins	Sherman Brothers
1964 (37th)	Becket	Laurence Rosenthal
1964 (37th)	The Fall of the Roman Empire	Dimitri Tiomkin
1964 (37th)	Hush...Hush, Sweet Charlotte	Frank De Vol
1964 (37th)	The Pink Panther	Henry Mancini
1964 (37th)	Scoring of Music — Adaptation or Treatment	
1964 (37th)	My Fair Lady	André Previn
1964 (37th)	A Hard Day's Night	George Martin
1964 (37th)	Mary Poppins	Irwin Kostal
1964 (37th)	Robin and the 7 Hoods	Nelson Riddle
1964 (37th)	The Unsinkable Molly Brown	Robert Armbruster, Leo Arnaud, Jack Elliott, Jack Hayes, Calvin Jackson and Leo Shuken
1965 (38th)
1965 (38th)	Music Score — Substantially Original	
1965 (38th)	Doctor Zhivago	Maurice Jarre
1965 (38th)	The Agony and the Ecstasy	Alex North
1965 (38th)	The Greatest Story Ever Told	Alfred Newman
1965 (38th)	A Patch of Blue	Jerry Goldsmith
1965 (38th)	The Umbrellas of Cherbourg	Jacques Demy and Michel Legrand
1965 (38th)	Scoring of Music — Adaptation or Treatment	
1965 (38th)	The Sound of Music	Irwin Kostal
1965 (38th)	Cat Ballou	Frank De Vol
1965 (38th)	The Pleasure Seekers	Sandy Courage and Lionel Newman
1965 (38th)	A Thousand Clowns	Don Walker
1965 (38th)	The Umbrellas of Cherbourg	Michel Legrand
1966 (39th)
1966 (39th)	Original Music Score	
1966 (39th)	Born Free	John Barry
1966 (39th)	The Bible: In the Beginning...	Toshiro Mayuzumi
1966 (39th)	Hawaii	Elmer Bernstein
1966 (39th)	The Sand Pebbles	Jerry Goldsmith
1966 (39th)	Who's Afraid of Virginia Woolf?	Alex North
1966 (39th)	Scoring of Music — Adaptation or Treatment	
1966 (39th)	A Funny Thing Happened on the Way to the Forum	Ken Thorne
1966 (39th)	The Gospel According to St. Matthew	Luis Bacalov
1966 (39th)	Return of the Seven	Elmer Bernstein
1966 (39th)	The Singing Nun	Harry Sukman
1966 (39th)	Stop the World – I Want to Get Off	Al Ham
1967 (40th)
1967 (40th)	Original Music Score	
1967 (40th)	Thoroughly Modern Millie	Elmer Bernstein
1967 (40th)	Cool Hand Luke	Lalo Schifrin
1967 (40th)	Doctor Dolittle	Leslie Bricusse
1967 (40th)	Far from the Madding Crowd	Richard Rodney Bennett
1967 (40th)	In Cold Blood	Quincy Jones
1967 (40th)	Scoring of Music — Adaptation or Treatment	
1967 (40th)	Camelot	Ken Darby and Alfred Newman
1967 (40th)	Doctor Dolittle	Sandy Courage and Lionel Newman
1967 (40th)	Guess Who's Coming to Dinner	Frank De Vol
1967 (40th)	Thoroughly Modern Millie	Joseph Gershenson and André Previn
1967 (40th)	Valley of the Dolls	John Williams
1968 (41st)
1968 (41st)	Original Score — For a Motion Picture (Not a Musical)	
1968 (41st)	The Lion in Winter	John Barry
1968 (41st)	The Fox	Lalo Schifrin
1968 (41st)	Planet of the Apes	Jerry Goldsmith
1968 (41st)	The Shoes of the Fisherman	Alex North
1968 (41st)	The Thomas Crown Affair	Michel Legrand
1968 (41st)	Scoring of a Musical Picture — Original or Adaptation	
1968 (41st)	Oliver!	Johnny Green (adaptation score)
1968 (41st)	Finian's Rainbow	Ray Heindorf (adaptation score)
1968 (41st)	Funny Girl	Walter Scharf (adaptation score)
1968 (41st)	Star!	Lennie Hayton (adaptation score)
1968 (41st)	The Young Girls of Rochefort	Michel Legrand (music and adaptation score) and Jacques Demy (lyrics)
1969 (42nd)
1969 (42nd)	Original Score — For a Motion Picture (Not a Musical)	
1969 (42nd)	Butch Cassidy and the Sundance Kid	Burt Bacharach
1969 (42nd)	Anne of the Thousand Days	Georges Delerue
1969 (42nd)	The Reivers	John Williams
1969 (42nd)	The Secret of Santa Vittoria	Ernest Gold
1969 (42nd)	The Wild Bunch	Jerry Fielding
1969 (42nd)	Scoring of a Musical Picture — Original or Adaptation	
1969 (42nd)	Hello, Dolly!	Lennie Hayton and Lionel Newman (adaptation score)
1969 (42nd)	Goodbye, Mr. Chips	Leslie Bricusse (music and lyrics) and John Williams (adaptation score)
1969 (42nd)	Paint Your Wagon	Nelson Riddle (adaptation score)
1969 (42nd)	Sweet Charity	Cy Coleman (adaptation score)
1969 (42nd)	They Shoot Horses, Don't They?	Johnny Green and Albert Woodbury (adaptation score)

=== 1970s ===
Year	Film	Nominees
1970 (43rd)	Original Score	
1970 (43rd)	Love Story	Francis Lai
1970 (43rd)	Airport	Alfred Newman (p.n.)
1970 (43rd)	Cromwell	Frank Cordell
1970 (43rd)	Patton	Jerry Goldsmith
1970 (43rd)	Sunflower	Henry Mancini
1970 (43rd)	Original Song Score	
1970 (43rd)	Let It Be	The Beatles (music and lyrics)
1970 (43rd)	The Baby Maker	Fred Karlin (music) and Tylwyth Kymry (lyrics)
1970 (43rd)	A Boy Named Charlie Brown	Rod McKuen (music and lyrics), John Scott Trotter (music), Bill Melendez, Al Shean (lyrics), Vince Guaraldi (adaptation score)
1970 (43rd)	Darling Lili	Henry Mancini (music) and Johnny Mercer (lyrics)
1970 (43rd)	Scrooge	Leslie Bricusse (music and lyrics), Ian Fraser and Herbert W. Spencer (adaptation score)
1971 (44th)
1971 (44th)	Original Dramatic Score	
1971 (44th)	Summer of '42	Michel Legrand
1971 (44th)	Mary, Queen of Scots	John Barry
1971 (44th)	Nicholas and Alexandra	Richard Rodney Bennett
1971 (44th)	Shaft	Isaac Hayes
1971 (44th)	Straw Dogs	Jerry Fielding
1971 (44th)	Scoring: Adaptation and Original Song Score	
1971 (44th)	Fiddler on the Roof	John Williams (adaptation score)
1971 (44th)	Bedknobs and Broomsticks	Sherman Brothers (song score) and Irwin Kostal (adaptation score)
1971 (44th)	The Boy Friend	Peter Maxwell Davies and Peter Greenwell (adaptation score)
1971 (44th)	Tchaikovsky	Dimitri Tiomkin (adaptation score)
1971 (44th)	Willy Wonka & the Chocolate Factory	Leslie Bricusse and Anthony Newley (song score) and Walter Scharf (adaptation score)
1972 (45th)
1972 (45th)	Original Dramatic Score	
1972 (45th)	Limelight (Note: Limelight was originally released in 1952, but had never screened theatrically in Los Angeles until 1972, at which point it became eligible for Oscar consideration.)	Charlie Chaplin, Raymond Rasch (p.r.) and Larry Russell (p.r.)
1972 (45th)	~~The Godfather~~ (nomination revoked) (Note: Nino Rota was nominated for The Godfather in 1972, but the nomination was revoked after it was discovered Rota had reused music from the 1958 Italian film Fortunella. The Academy's entire music branch revoted for a fifth nominee. They could either renominate Rota for The Godfather or select one of the five other shortlisted scores: Ben by Walter Scharf, Fellini's Roma by Rota, The Life and Times of Judge Roy Bean by Maurice Jarre, The Other by Jerry Goldsmith, or Sleuth by John Addison. Sleuth received the most votes and became the fifth nominee.)	Nino Rota
1972 (45th)	Images	John Williams
1972 (45th)	Napoleon and Samantha	Buddy Baker
1972 (45th)	The Poseidon Adventure	John Williams
1972 (45th)	Sleuth	John Addison
1972 (45th)	Scoring: Adaptation and Original Song Score	
1972 (45th)	Cabaret	Ralph Burns (adaptation score)
1972 (45th)	Lady Sings the Blues	Gil Askey (adaptation score)
1972 (45th)	Man of La Mancha	Laurence Rosenthal (adaptation score)
1973 (46th)
1973 (46th)	Original Dramatic Score	
1973 (46th)	The Way We Were	Marvin Hamlisch
1973 (46th)	Cinderella Liberty	John Williams
1973 (46th)	The Day of the Dolphin	Georges Delerue
1973 (46th)	Papillon	Jerry Goldsmith
1973 (46th)	A Touch of Class	John Cameron
1973 (46th)	Scoring: Original Song Score and Adaptation or Scoring: Adaptation	
1973 (46th)	The Sting	Marvin Hamlisch (adaptation score)
1973 (46th)	Jesus Christ Superstar	André Previn, Herbert W. Spencer and Andrew Lloyd Webber (adaptation score)
1973 (46th)	Tom Sawyer	Sherman Brothers (song score) and John Williams (adaptation score)
1974 (47th)
1974 (47th)	Original Dramatic Score	
1974 (47th)	The Godfather Part II	Nino Rota and Carmine Coppola
1974 (47th)	Chinatown	Jerry Goldsmith
1974 (47th)	Murder on the Orient Express	Richard Rodney Bennett
1974 (47th)	Shanks	Alex North
1974 (47th)	The Towering Inferno	John Williams
1974 (47th)	Scoring: Original Song Score and Adaptation or Scoring: Adaptation	
1974 (47th)	The Great Gatsby	Nelson Riddle (adaptation score)
1974 (47th)	The Little Prince	Alan Jay Lerner and Frederick Loewe (song score), Douglas Gamley and Angela Morley (adaptation score)
1974 (47th)	Phantom of the Paradise	Paul Williams (song and adaptation score) and George Tipton (adaptation score)
1975 (48th)
1975 (48th)	Original Score	
1975 (48th)	Jaws	John Williams
1975 (48th)	Birds Do It, Bees Do It	Gerald Fried
1975 (48th)	Bite the Bullet	Alex North
1975 (48th)	One Flew Over the Cuckoo's Nest	Jack Nitzsche
1975 (48th)	The Wind and the Lion	Jerry Goldsmith
1975 (48th)	Scoring: Original Song Score and Adaptation or Scoring: Adaptation	
1975 (48th)	Barry Lyndon	Leonard Rosenman (adaptation score)
1975 (48th)	Funny Lady	Peter Matz (adaptation score)
1975 (48th)	Tommy	Pete Townshend (adaptation score)
1976 (49th)
1976 (49th)	Original Score	
1976 (49th)	The Omen	Jerry Goldsmith
1976 (49th)	Obsession	Bernard Herrmann (p.n.)
1976 (49th)	The Outlaw Josey Wales	Jerry Fielding
1976 (49th)	Taxi Driver	Bernard Herrmann (p.n.)
1976 (49th)	Voyage of the Damned	Lalo Schifrin
1976 (49th)	Original Song Score and Its Adaptation or Adaptation Score	
1976 (49th)	Bound for Glory	Leonard Rosenman (adaptation score)
1976 (49th)	Bugsy Malone	Paul Williams (song and adaptation score)
1976 (49th)	A Star Is Born	Roger Kellaway (adaptation score)
1977 (50th)
1977 (50th)	Original Score	
1977 (50th)	Star Wars	John Williams
1977 (50th)	Close Encounters of the Third Kind	John Williams
1977 (50th)	Julia	Georges Delerue
1977 (50th)	Mohammad, Messenger of God	Maurice Jarre
1977 (50th)	The Spy Who Loved Me	Marvin Hamlisch
1977 (50th)	Original Song Score and Its Adaptation or Adaptation Score	
1977 (50th)	A Little Night Music	Jonathan Tunick (adaptation score)
1977 (50th)	Pete's Dragon	Joel Hirschhorn and Al Kasha (song score) and Irwin Kostal (adaptation score)
1977 (50th)	The Slipper and the Rose	Sherman Brothers (song score) and Angela Morley (adaptation score)
1978 (51st)
1978 (51st)	Original Score	
1978 (51st)	Midnight Express	Giorgio Moroder
1978 (51st)	The Boys from Brazil	Jerry Goldsmith
1978 (51st)	Days of Heaven	Ennio Morricone
1978 (51st)	Heaven Can Wait	Dave Grusin
1978 (51st)	Superman	John Williams
1978 (51st)	Adaptation Score	
1978 (51st)	The Buddy Holly Story	Joe Renzetti
1978 (51st)	Pretty Baby	Jerry Wexler
1978 (51st)	The Wiz	Quincy Jones
1979 (52nd)
1979 (52nd)	Original Score	
1979 (52nd)	A Little Romance	Georges Delerue
1979 (52nd)	10	Henry Mancini
1979 (52nd)	The Amityville Horror	Lalo Schifrin
1979 (52nd)	The Champ	Dave Grusin
1979 (52nd)	Star Trek: The Motion Picture	Jerry Goldsmith
1979 (52nd)	Original Song Score and Its Adaptation or Adaptation Score	
1979 (52nd)	All That Jazz	Ralph Burns (adaptation score)
1979 (52nd)	Breaking Away	Patrick Williams (adaptation score)
1979 (52nd)	The Muppet Movie	Paul Williams (song and adaptation score) and Kenny Ascher (song score)

=== 1980s ===
Year	Film	Nominees
1980 (53rd)	Fame	Michael Gore
1980 (53rd)	Altered States	John Corigliano
1980 (53rd)	The Elephant Man	John Morris
1980 (53rd)	The Empire Strikes Back	John Williams
1980 (53rd)	Tess	Philippe Sarde
1981 (54th)
1981 (54th)	Chariots of Fire	Vangelis
1981 (54th)	Dragonslayer	Alex North
1981 (54th)	On Golden Pond	Dave Grusin
1981 (54th)	Ragtime	Randy Newman
1981 (54th)	Raiders of the Lost Ark	John Williams
1982 (55th)
1982 (55th)	Original Score	
1982 (55th)	E.T. the Extra-Terrestrial	John Williams
1982 (55th)	Gandhi	George Fenton and Ravi Shankar
1982 (55th)	An Officer and a Gentleman	Jack Nitzsche
1982 (55th)	Poltergeist	Jerry Goldsmith
1982 (55th)	Sophie's Choice	Marvin Hamlisch
1982 (55th)	Original Song Score and Its Adaptation or Adaptation Score	
1982 (55th)	Victor/Victoria	Henry Mancini (song and adaptation score) and Leslie Bricusse (song score)
1982 (55th)	Annie	Ralph Burns (adaptation score)
1982 (55th)	One from the Heart	Tom Waits (song score)
1983 (56th)
1983 (56th)	Original Score	
1983 (56th)	The Right Stuff	Bill Conti
1983 (56th)	Cross Creek	Leonard Rosenman
1983 (56th)	Return of the Jedi	John Williams
1983 (56th)	Terms of Endearment	Michael Gore
1983 (56th)	Under Fire	Jerry Goldsmith
1983 (56th)	Original Song Score and Its Adaptation or Adaptation Score	
1983 (56th)	Yentl	Michel Legrand (song and adaptation score) and Alan and Marilyn Bergman (song score)
1983 (56th)	The Sting II	Lalo Schifrin (adaptation score)
1983 (56th)	Trading Places	Elmer Bernstein (adaptation score)
1984 (57th)
1984 (57th)	Original Score	
1984 (57th)	A Passage to India	Maurice Jarre
1984 (57th)	Indiana Jones and the Temple of Doom	John Williams
1984 (57th)	The Natural	Randy Newman
1984 (57th)	The River	John Williams
1984 (57th)	Under the Volcano	Alex North
1984 (57th)	Original Song Score	
1984 (57th)	Purple Rain	Prince
1984 (57th)	The Muppets Take Manhattan	Jeff Moss
1984 (57th)	Songwriter	Kris Kristofferson
1985 (58th)
1985 (58th)	Out of Africa	John Barry
1985 (58th)	Agnes of God	Georges Delerue
1985 (58th)	The Color Purple	Chris Boardman, Jorge Calandrelli, Andraé Crouch, Jack Hayes, Jerry Hey, Quincy Jones, Randy Kerber, Jeremy Lubbock, Joel Rosenbaum, Caiphus Semenya, Fred Steiner and Rod Temperton
1985 (58th)	Silverado	Bruce Broughton
1985 (58th)	Witness	Maurice Jarre
1986 (59th)
1986 (59th)	Round Midnight	Herbie Hancock
1986 (59th)	Aliens	James Horner
1986 (59th)	Hoosiers	Jerry Goldsmith
1986 (59th)	The Mission	Ennio Morricone
1986 (59th)	Star Trek IV: The Voyage Home	Leonard Rosenman
1987 (60th)
1987 (60th)	The Last Emperor	Ryuichi Sakamoto, David Byrne and Cong Su
1987 (60th)	Cry Freedom	George Fenton and Jonas Gwangwa
1987 (60th)	Empire of the Sun	John Williams
1987 (60th)	The Untouchables	Ennio Morricone
1987 (60th)	The Witches of Eastwick	John Williams
1988 (61st)
1988 (61st)	The Milagro Beanfield War	Dave Grusin
1988 (61st)	The Accidental Tourist	John Williams
1988 (61st)	Dangerous Liaisons	George Fenton
1988 (61st)	Gorillas in the Mist	Maurice Jarre
1988 (61st)	Rain Man	Hans Zimmer
1989 (62nd)
1989 (62nd)	The Little Mermaid	Alan Menken
1989 (62nd)	Born on the Fourth of July	John Williams
1989 (62nd)	The Fabulous Baker Boys	Dave Grusin
1989 (62nd)	Field of Dreams	James Horner
1989 (62nd)	Indiana Jones and the Last Crusade	John Williams

=== 1990s ===
Year	Film	Nominees
1990 (63rd)	Dances With Wolves	John Barry
1990 (63rd)	Avalon	Randy Newman
1990 (63rd)	Ghost	Maurice Jarre
1990 (63rd)	Havana	Dave Grusin
1990 (63rd)	Home Alone	John Williams
1991 (64th)
1991 (64th)	Beauty and the Beast	Alan Menken
1991 (64th)	Bugsy	Ennio Morricone
1991 (64th)	The Fisher King	George Fenton
1991 (64th)	JFK	John Williams
1991 (64th)	The Prince of Tides	James Newton Howard
1992 (65th)
1992 (65th)	Aladdin	Alan Menken
1992 (65th)	Basic Instinct	Jerry Goldsmith
1992 (65th)	Chaplin	John Barry
1992 (65th)	Howards End	Richard Robbins
1992 (65th)	A River Runs Through It	Mark Isham
1993 (66th)
1993 (66th)	Schindler's List	John Williams
1993 (66th)	The Age of Innocence	Elmer Bernstein
1993 (66th)	The Firm	Dave Grusin
1993 (66th)	The Fugitive	James Newton Howard
1993 (66th)	The Remains of the Day	Richard Robbins
1994 (67th)
1994 (67th)	The Lion King	Hans Zimmer
1994 (67th)	Forrest Gump	Alan Silvestri
1994 (67th)	Interview with the Vampire	Elliot Goldenthal
1994 (67th)	Little Women	Thomas Newman
1994 (67th)	The Shawshank Redemption	Thomas Newman
1995 (68th) (Note: From 1995 until 1998, Best Original Score was split into Original Dramatic Score and Original Musical or Comedy Score. For musicals and comedies, songwriters and lyricists along with orchestral underscore composers were eligible for nomination.)
1995 (68th)	Original Dramatic Score	
1995 (68th)	The Postman	Luis Bacalov
1995 (68th)	Apollo 13	James Horner
1995 (68th)	Braveheart	James Horner
1995 (68th)	Nixon	John Williams
1995 (68th)	Sense and Sensibility	Patrick Doyle
1995 (68th)	Original Musical or Comedy Score	
1995 (68th)	Pocahontas	Alan Menken (music and orchestral score) and Stephen Schwartz (lyrics)
1995 (68th)	The American President	Marc Shaiman
1995 (68th)	Sabrina	John Williams
1995 (68th)	Toy Story	Randy Newman
1995 (68th)	Unstrung Heroes	Thomas Newman
1996 (69th)
1996 (69th)	Original Dramatic Score	
1996 (69th)	The English Patient	Gabriel Yared
1996 (69th)	Hamlet	Patrick Doyle
1996 (69th)	Michael Collins	Elliot Goldenthal
1996 (69th)	Shine	David Hirschfelder
1996 (69th)	Sleepers	John Williams
1996 (69th)	Original Musical or Comedy Score	
1996 (69th)	Emma	Rachel Portman
1996 (69th)	The First Wives Club	Marc Shaiman
1996 (69th)	The Hunchback of Notre Dame	Alan Menken (music and orchestral score) and Stephen Schwartz (lyrics)
1996 (69th)	James and the Giant Peach	Randy Newman
1996 (69th)	The Preacher's Wife	Hans Zimmer
1997 (70th)
1997 (70th)	Original Dramatic Score	
1997 (70th)	Titanic	James Horner
1997 (70th)	Amistad	John Williams
1997 (70th)	Good Will Hunting	Danny Elfman
1997 (70th)	Kundun	Philip Glass
1997 (70th)	L.A. Confidential	Jerry Goldsmith
1997 (70th)	Original Musical or Comedy Score	
1997 (70th)	The Full Monty	Anne Dudley
1997 (70th)	Anastasia	Stephen Flaherty (music), Lynn Ahrens (lyrics) and David Newman (orchestral score)
1997 (70th)	As Good as It Gets	Hans Zimmer
1997 (70th)	Men in Black	Danny Elfman
1997 (70th)	My Best Friend's Wedding	James Newton Howard
1998 (71st)
1998 (71st)	Original Dramatic Score	
1998 (71st)	Life Is Beautiful	Nicola Piovani
1998 (71st)	Elizabeth	David Hirschfelder
1998 (71st)	Pleasantville	Randy Newman
1998 (71st)	Saving Private Ryan	John Williams
1998 (71st)	The Thin Red Line	Hans Zimmer
1998 (71st)	Original Musical or Comedy Score	
1998 (71st)	Shakespeare in Love	Stephen Warbeck
1998 (71st)	A Bug's Life	Randy Newman
1998 (71st)	Mulan	Matthew Wilder (music), David Zippel (lyrics) and Jerry Goldsmith (orchestral score)
1998 (71st)	Patch Adams	Marc Shaiman
1998 (71st)	The Prince of Egypt	Stephen Schwartz (music and lyrics) and Hans Zimmer (orchestral score)
1999 (72nd)
1999 (72nd)	The Red Violin	John Corigliano
1999 (72nd)	American Beauty	Thomas Newman
1999 (72nd)	Angela's Ashes	John Williams
1999 (72nd)	The Cider House Rules	Rachel Portman
1999 (72nd)	The Talented Mr. Ripley	Gabriel Yared

=== 2000s ===
Year	Film	Nominees
2000 (73rd)	Crouching Tiger, Hidden Dragon	Tan Dun
2000 (73rd)	Chocolat	Rachel Portman
2000 (73rd)	Gladiator	Hans Zimmer (Note: Lisa Gerrard and Klaus Badelt also received screen credit for the Gladiator score, but only Zimmer was deemed eligible for the nomination.)
2000 (73rd)	Malèna	Ennio Morricone
2000 (73rd)	The Patriot	John Williams
2001 (74th)
2001 (74th)	The Lord of the Rings: The Fellowship of the Ring	Howard Shore
2001 (74th)	A.I. Artificial Intelligence	John Williams
2001 (74th)	A Beautiful Mind	James Horner
2001 (74th)	Harry Potter and the Sorcerer's Stone	John Williams
2001 (74th)	Monsters, Inc.	Randy Newman
2002 (75th)
2002 (75th)	Frida	Elliot Goldenthal
2002 (75th)	Catch Me If You Can	John Williams
2002 (75th)	Far from Heaven	Elmer Bernstein
2002 (75th)	The Hours	Philip Glass
2002 (75th)	Road to Perdition	Thomas Newman
2003 (76th)
2003 (76th)	The Lord of the Rings: The Return of the King	Howard Shore
2003 (76th)	Big Fish	Danny Elfman
2003 (76th)	Cold Mountain	Gabriel Yared
2003 (76th)	Finding Nemo	Thomas Newman
2003 (76th)	House of Sand and Fog	James Horner
2004 (77th)
2004 (77th)	Finding Neverland	Jan A. P. Kaczmarek
2004 (77th)	Harry Potter and the Prisoner of Azkaban	John Williams
2004 (77th)	Lemony Snicket's A Series of Unfortunate Events	Thomas Newman
2004 (77th)	The Passion of the Christ	John Debney
2004 (77th)	The Village	James Newton Howard
2005 (78th)
2005 (78th)	Brokeback Mountain	Gustavo Santaolalla
2005 (78th)	The Constant Gardener	Alberto Iglesias
2005 (78th)	Memoirs of a Geisha	John Williams
2005 (78th)	Munich	John Williams
2005 (78th)	Pride & Prejudice	Dario Marianelli
2006 (79th)
2006 (79th)	Babel	Gustavo Santaolalla
2006 (79th)	The Good German	Thomas Newman
2006 (79th)	Notes on a Scandal	Philip Glass
2006 (79th)	Pan's Labyrinth	Javier Navarrete
2006 (79th)	The Queen	Alexandre Desplat
2007 (80th)
2007 (80th)	Atonement	Dario Marianelli
2007 (80th)	3:10 to Yuma	Marco Beltrami
2007 (80th)	The Kite Runner	Alberto Iglesias
2007 (80th)	Michael Clayton	James Newton Howard
2007 (80th)	Ratatouille	Michael Giacchino
2008 (81st)
2008 (81st)	Slumdog Millionaire	A.R. Rahman
2008 (81st)	The Curious Case of Benjamin Button	Alexandre Desplat
2008 (81st)	Defiance	James Newton Howard
2008 (81st)	Milk	Danny Elfman
2008 (81st)	WALL-E	Thomas Newman
2009 (82nd)
2009 (82nd)	Up	Michael Giacchino
2009 (82nd)	Avatar	James Horner
2009 (82nd)	Fantastic Mr. Fox	Alexandre Desplat
2009 (82nd)	The Hurt Locker	Marco Beltrami and Buck Sanders
2009 (82nd)	Sherlock Holmes	Hans Zimmer

=== 2010s ===
Year	Film	Nominees
2010 (83rd)	The Social Network	Trent Reznor and Atticus Ross
2010 (83rd)	127 Hours	A.R. Rahman
2010 (83rd)	How to Train Your Dragon	John Powell
2010 (83rd)	Inception	Hans Zimmer
2010 (83rd)	The King's Speech	Alexandre Desplat
2011 (84th)
2011 (84th)	The Artist	Ludovic Bource
2011 (84th)	The Adventures of Tintin	John Williams
2011 (84th)	Hugo	Howard Shore
2011 (84th)	Tinker Tailor Soldier Spy	Alberto Iglesias
2011 (84th)	War Horse	John Williams
2012 (85th)
2012 (85th)	Life of Pi	Mychael Danna
2012 (85th)	Anna Karenina	Dario Marianelli
2012 (85th)	Argo	Alexandre Desplat
2012 (85th)	Lincoln	John Williams
2012 (85th)	Skyfall	Thomas Newman
2013 (86th)
2013 (86th)	Gravity	Steven Price
2013 (86th)	The Book Thief	John Williams
2013 (86th)	Her	Will Butler and Owen Pallett
2013 (86th)	Philomena	Alexandre Desplat
2013 (86th)	Saving Mr. Banks	Thomas Newman
2014 (87th)
2014 (87th)	The Grand Budapest Hotel	Alexandre Desplat
2014 (87th)	The Imitation Game	Alexandre Desplat
2014 (87th)	Interstellar	Hans Zimmer
2014 (87th)	Mr. Turner	Gary Yershon
2014 (87th)	The Theory of Everything	Jóhann Jóhannsson
2015 (88th)
2015 (88th)	The Hateful Eight	Ennio Morricone
2015 (88th)	Bridge of Spies	Thomas Newman
2015 (88th)	Carol	Carter Burwell
2015 (88th)	Sicario	Jóhann Jóhannsson
2015 (88th)	Star Wars: The Force Awakens	John Williams
2016 (89th)
2016 (89th)	La La Land	Justin Hurwitz
2016 (89th)	Jackie	Mica Levi
2016 (89th)	Lion	Dustin O'Halloran and Volker Bertelmann
2016 (89th)	Moonlight	Nicholas Britell
2016 (89th)	Passengers	Thomas Newman
2017 (90th)
2017 (90th)	The Shape of Water	Alexandre Desplat
2017 (90th)	Dunkirk	Hans Zimmer
2017 (90th)	Phantom Thread	Jonny Greenwood
2017 (90th)	Star Wars: The Last Jedi	John Williams
2017 (90th)	Three Billboards Outside Ebbing, Missouri	Carter Burwell
2018 (91st)
2018 (91st)	Black Panther	Ludwig Göransson
2018 (91st)	BlacKkKlansman	Terence Blanchard
2018 (91st)	If Beale Street Could Talk	Nicholas Britell
2018 (91st)	Isle of Dogs	Alexandre Desplat
2018 (91st)	Mary Poppins Returns	Marc Shaiman
2019 (92nd)
2019 (92nd)	Joker	Hildur Guðnadóttir
2019 (92nd)	Little Women	Alexandre Desplat
2019 (92nd)	Marriage Story	Randy Newman
2019 (92nd)	1917	Thomas Newman
2019 (92nd)	Star Wars: The Rise of Skywalker	John Williams

=== 2020s ===
Year	Film	Nominees
2020/21 (Note: The eligibility period for the 93rd ceremony was exceptionally extended through to February 28, 2021, due to the impact of the COVID-19 pandemic.) (93rd)	Soul	Trent Reznor, Atticus Ross and Jon Batiste
2020/21 (93rd)	Da 5 Bloods	Terence Blanchard
2020/21 (93rd)	Mank	Trent Reznor and Atticus Ross
2020/21 (93rd)	Minari	Emile Mosseri
2020/21 (93rd)	News of the World	James Newton Howard
2021 (94th)	Dune	Hans Zimmer
2021 (94th)	Don't Look Up	Nicholas Britell
2021 (94th)	Encanto	Germaine Franco
2021 (94th)	Parallel Mothers	Alberto Iglesias
2021 (94th)	The Power of the Dog	Jonny Greenwood
2022 (95th)	All Quiet on the Western Front	Volker Bertelmann
2022 (95th)	Babylon	Justin Hurwitz
2022 (95th)	The Banshees of Inisherin	Carter Burwell
2022 (95th)	Everything Everywhere All at Once	Son Lux
2022 (95th)	The Fabelmans	John Williams
2023 (96th)	Oppenheimer	Ludwig Göransson
2023 (96th)	American Fiction	Laura Karpman
2023 (96th)	Indiana Jones and the Dial of Destiny	John Williams
2023 (96th)	Killers of the Flower Moon	Robbie Robertson (p.n.)
2023 (96th)	Poor Things	Jerskin Fendrix
2024 (97th)	The Brutalist	Daniel Blumberg
2024 (97th)	Conclave	Volker Bertelmann
2024 (97th)	Emilia Pérez	Clément Ducol and Camille
2024 (97th)	Wicked	John Powell and Stephen Schwartz
2024 (97th)	The Wild Robot	Kris Bowers
2025 (98th)	Sinners	Ludwig Göransson
2025 (98th)	Bugonia	Jerskin Fendrix
2025 (98th)	Frankenstein	Alexandre Desplat
2025 (98th)	Hamnet	Max Richter
2025 (98th)	One Battle After Another	Jonny Greenwood

== Shortlisted finalists ==
Finalists for Best Score are selected by the Music Branch. Music Branch members shall vote in order of their preference for not more than 15 pictures to be considered for the Score award. The 15 motion pictures receiving the highest number of votes shall advance to the next round of voting.

Year	Finalists	Ref
1965	Original Score: Cat Ballou, The Great Race, The Sandpiper, That Darn Cat!, What's New Pussycat? Scoring of Music — Adaptation or Treatment: Do Not Disturb, Tickle Me	
1966	Original Score: Alfie, Arabesque, Fantastic Voyage, Nevada Smith, The Russians Are Coming the Russians Are Coming; Scoring of Music — Adaptation or Treatment: Frankie and Johnny, Hold On!, Paradise, Hawaiian Style, Spinout	
1967	Original Score: Bonnie and Clyde, The Flim-Flam Man, Live for Life, Two for the Road, Wait Until Dark; Scoring of Music — Adaptation or Treatment: A Countess from Hong Kong, The Family Way, The Happiest Millionaire, How to Succeed in Business Without Really Trying, The Jungle Book	
1968	Original Score: For Love of Ivy, The Heart Is a Lonely Hunter, Rachel, Rachel, Romeo and Juliet, War and Peace; Scoring of a Musical Picture: C'mon, Let's Live a Little, Chitty Chitty Bang Bang, The One and Only, Genuine, Original Family Band	
1969	Original Score: Bob & Carol & Ted & Alice, Gaily, Gaily, The Happy Ending, The Madwoman of Chaillot, True Grit; Scoring of a Musical Picture: Can Heironymus Merkin Ever Forget Mercy Humppe and Find True Happiness?, Marry Me! Marry Me!, Oh! What a Lovely War	
1970	Original Score: The Aristocats, Beneath the Planet of the Apes, Dirty Dingus Magee, Pieces of Dreams, Ryan's Daughter; Original Song Score: Beyond the Valley of the Dolls, Cotton Comes to Harlem, Norwood, R. P. M., Where's Poppa?	
1971	Original Score: Escape from the Planet of the Apes, The French Connection, The Hellstrom Chronicle, Kotch, Sometimes a Great Notion; Original Song Score or Adaptation Score: Honky, Jud, Zachariah	
1972	Original Score: Ben, Fellini's Roma, The Life and Times of Judge Roy Bean, The Other; Original Song Score or Adaptation Score: Alice's Adventures in Wonderland, 1776, Snoopy Come Home, Young Winston	
1973	Original Score: Enter the Dragon, The Last American Hero, Oklahoma Crude, The Paper Chase, Robin Hood; Original Song Score or Adaptation Score: Bang the Drum Slowly, Jonathan Livingston Seagull, Lost Horizon, O Lucky Man!	
1974	Original Score: The Castaway Cowboy, The Conversation, Earthquake, The Golden Voyage of Sinbad, The White Dawn; Original Song Score or Adaptation Score: Claudine, Huckleberry Finn, Lenny, Mame	
1975	Original Score: The Adventure of Sherlock Holmes' Smarter Brother, The Eiger Sanction, The Hindenburg, The Other Side of the Mountain, The Yakuza; Original Song Score or Adaptation Score: The Day of the Locust, Lucky Lady, The Return of the Pink Panther, W.W. and the Dixie Dancekings	
1976	Original Score: King Kong, Logan's Run, The Pink Panther Strikes Again, Rocky, Silent Movie; Original Song Score or Adaptation Score: The Bad News Bears, Car Wash, The Duchess and the Dirtwater Fox, Leadbelly	
1977	Original Score: Airport '77, Audrey Rose, Black Sunday, Bobby Deerfield, A Bridge Too Far, Equus, Gasp, The Gauntlet, The Island of Dr. Moreau, Islands in the Stream, Joseph Andrews, MacArthur, 1900, Providence, The Rescuers, Rollercoaster, The Sentinel, Walking Tall: Final Chapter; Original Song Score or Adaptation Score: New York, New York	
1978	Original Score: Capricorn One, Coma, Magic, Revenge of the Pink Panther, Watership Down; Original Song Score or Adaptation Score: The Cheap Detective, Damien - Omen II, The Deer Hunter, The Magic of Lassie	
1979	Original Score: Escape from Alcatraz, The Frisco Kid, The Great Train Robbery, Meteor, Time After Time; Original Song Score or Adaptation Score: The Europeans, Hair, Meeting with Remarkable Men, Wise Blood	
2018	Annihilation, Avengers: Infinity War, The Ballad of Buster Scruggs, Crazy Rich Asians, The Death of Stalin, Fantastic Beasts: The Crimes of Grindelwald, First Man, A Quiet Place, Ready Player One, Vice	
2019	Avengers: Endgame, Bombshell, The Farewell, Ford v Ferrari, Frozen II, Jojo Rabbit, The King, Motherless Brooklyn, Pain and Glory, Us	
2020/21	Ammonite, Blizzard of Souls, The Invisible Man, Jingle Jangle: A Christmas Journey, The Life Ahead, The Little Things, The Midnight Sky, Mulan, Tenet, The Trial of the Chicago 7	
2021	Being the Ricardos, Candyman, The French Dispatch, The Green Knight, The Harder They Fall, King Richard, The Last Duel, No Time to Die, Spencer, The Tragedy of Macbeth	
2022	Avatar: The Way of Water, Black Panther: Wakanda Forever, Devotion, Don't Worry Darling, Glass Onion: A Knives Out Mystery, Guillermo del Toro's Pinocchio, Nope, She Said, The Woman King, Women Talking	
2023	American Symphony, Barbie, The Boy and the Heron, The Color Purple, Elemental, The Holdovers, Saltburn, Society of the Snow, Spider-Man: Across the Spider-Verse, The Zone of Interest	
2024	Alien: Romulus, Babygirl, Beetlejuice Beetlejuice, Blink Twice, Blitz, Challengers, The Fire Inside, Gladiator II, Horizon: An American Saga – Chapter 1, Inside Out 2, Nosferatu, The Room Next Door, Sing Sing, The Six Triple Eight, Young Woman and the Sea	
2025	Avatar: Fire and Ash, Captain America: Brave New World, Diane Warren: Relentless, F1, Hedda, A House of Dynamite, Jay Kelly, Marty Supreme, Nuremberg, Sirāt, Train Dreams, Tron: Ares, Truth & Treason, Wake Up Dead Man, Wicked: For Good	

== Records ==
=== Superlatives ===
These are only for nominations in the Scoring categories. Nominations in other categories, such as the Original Song category, are not included.

Category	Name	Superlative	Notes
Most Awards	Alfred Newman	9 awards	Awards resulted from 41 nominations
Most Nominations	John Williams	49 nominations	Nominations resulted in 5 awards
Most Nominations without an Award	Thomas Newman / Alex North	14 nominations	

=== Age superlatives ===
Record	Composer	Film	Age
Oldest winner	Ennio Morricone	The Hateful Eight	87 years, 110 days
Oldest nominee	John Williams	Indiana Jones and the Dial of Destiny	91 years, 349 days
Youngest winner	Prince	Purple Rain	26 years, 291 days
Youngest nominee	Prince	Purple Rain	26 years, 244 days

Only one composer has won two Scoring Oscars the same year: in 1973, Marvin Hamlisch won Original Dramatic Score for The Way We Were and Best Adaptation Score, for The Sting. Hamlisch also won Best Song that year for The Way We Were, making him the only composer to win three music Oscars in the same year.

Only one composer has won Oscars three years in a row: Roger Edens won for Easter Parade (1948), On the Town (1949) and Annie Get Your Gun (1950).

Eight composers have won Oscars two years in a row:

1. Ray Heindorf won for Yankee Doodle Dandy (1942) and This Is the Army (1943).
2. Franz Waxman won for Sunset Boulevard (1950) and A Place in the Sun (1951).
3. Alfred Newman won for With a Song in My Heart (1952) and Call Me Madam (1953). He won again two years in a row for Love Is a Many-Splendored Thing (1955) and The King and I (1956).
4. Adolph Deutsch won for Seven Brides for Seven Brothers (1954) and Oklahoma! (1955).
5. André Previn won for Gigi (1958) and Porgy and Bess (1959). He won again two years in a row for Irma la Douce (1963) and My Fair Lady (1964).
6. Leonard Rosenman won for Barry Lyndon (1975) and Bound for Glory (1976).
7. Alan Menken won for Beauty and The Beast (1991) and Aladdin (1992).
8. Gustavo Santaolalla won for Brokeback Mountain (2005) and Babel (2006).

=== Female nominees ===
As of 2025, only 11 women have been nominated in music score categories: Ann Ronell, Tylwyth Kymry, Angela Morley, Marilyn Bergman, Rachel Portman, Anne Dudley, Lynn Ahrens, Hildur Guðnadóttir, Germaine Franco, Laura Karpman, and Camille. Kymry, Bergman, and Ahrens were nominated for their contribution as lyricists.

Four women have won in the scoring categories. Three are composers: Rachel Portman, who won for Emma (1996); Anne Dudley, who won for The Full Monty (1997); and Hildur Guðnadóttir, who won for Joker (2019). The fourth is lyricist Marilyn Bergman, who won for Yentl (1983) in the Original Song Score category, sharing the award with co-lyricist Alan Bergman (her husband) and composer Michel Legrand. Hildur is the only woman to win the award under no qualifications; Bergman won for Best Song Score while Portman and Dudley won for Best Musical or Comedy Score.

The female composers nominated for multiple Scoring Oscars are Rachel Portman, who was nominated for Emma (1996) (for which she won for Best Musical or Comedy Score), The Cider House Rules (1999), and Chocolat (2000); and Angela Morley, who was nominated twice in the Original Song Score or Adaptation Score category for The Little Prince (1974) and The Slipper and the Rose (1976).

=== Notable nominees ===
Dmitri Shostakovich and Duke Ellington were both nominated the same year but lost to the arrangers of West Side Story.

The scores of Midnight Express by Giorgio Moroder in 1979, Slumdog Millionaire by A.R. Rahman in 2009, and The Social Network by Trent Reznor and Atticus Ross in 2011 are the only scores with electronic-based music ever to win the award. In addition, the electronic-based scores of Witness by Maurice Jarre in 1986, Rain Man by Hans Zimmer in 1989, and Her by William Butler, and Owen Pallett in 2014 have also been nominated.

Noted nominated composers known for their music mostly outside the film world include: Aaron Copland, Kurt Weill, Gian Carlo Menotti, Philip Glass, John Corigliano, Peter Maxwell Davies, Randy Newman, Richard Rodney Bennett, Stephen Schwartz, Andrew Lloyd Webber, Artie Shaw, Trent Reznor, Quincy Jones, Herbie Hancock, Jon Batiste, and Jonny Greenwood.

Rock musicians and pop stars are most often nominated in the songwriting category. These popular performers were nominated in the Scoring categories: The Beatles, Prince, Pete Townshend, Rod McKuen, Isaac Hayes, Kris Kristofferson, Quincy Jones, Randy Newman, Anthony Newley, Paul Williams, Tom Waits, David Byrne, Ryuichi Sakamoto, Trent Reznor, and Matthew Wilder.

Record producers George Martin (The Beatles) and Jerry Wexler (Atlantic Records) also received nominations in the Scoring categories.

=== Multiple nominations ===
The following is a list of composers nominated more than once and winning at least one Academy Award (in this category). This list is sorted by number of awards, with the number of total nominations listed in parentheses. These do not include nominations (or awards) in the Best Original Song category.

- 9: Alfred Newman (43)
- 5: John Williams (49) (Note: Also received 5 nominations for Best Original Song, which brings his total to 54 – the most nominated person in all of the music categories combined, and the most nominated living individual in any Oscars category)
- 4: Johnny Green (12)
- 4: André Previn (11)
- 4: John Barry (6)
- 4: Alan Menken (5)
- 3: Max Steiner (24)
- 3: Ray Heindorf (17)
- 3: Morris Stoloff (17)
- 3: Miklós Rózsa (16)
- 3: Dimitri Tiomkin (14)
- 3: Maurice Jarre (8)
- 3: Ken Darby (6)
- 3: Roger Edens (6)
- 3: Saul Chaplin (5)
- 3: Adolph Deutsch (5)
- 3: Ludwig Göransson (3)
- 2: Hans Zimmer (12)
- 2: Alexandre Desplat (11)
- 2: Franz Waxman (11)
- 2: Henry Mancini (7)
- 2: Lennie Hayton (6)
- 2: Michel Legrand (6)
- 2: Irwin Kostal (5)
- 2: Marvin Hamlisch (4)
- 2: Leonard Rosenman (4)
- 2: Ralph Burns (3)
- 2: Trent Reznor (3)
- 2: Atticus Ross (3)
- 2: Howard Shore (3)
- 2: Gustavo Santaolalla (2)
- 1: Jerry Goldsmith (17)
- 1: Victor Young (17)
- 1: Herbert Stothart (11)
- 1: Elmer Bernstein (10)
- 1: Hugo Friedhofer (9)
- 1: Lionel Newman (9)
- 1: Georgie Stoll (9)
- 1: James Horner (8)
- 1: Leigh Harline (7)
- 1: Charles Previn (7)
- 1: Paul Smith (7)
- 1: Dave Grusin (6)
- 1: Ennio Morricone (6) Also received an Academy Honorary Award.
- 1: Leslie Bricusse (5)
- 1: Georges Delerue (5)
- 1: Richard Hageman (5)
- 1: Bernard Herrmann (5)
- 1: Nelson Riddle (5)
- 1: Oliver Wallace (5)
- 1: Aaron Copland (4)
- 1: Leo F. Forbstein (4)
- 1: Ernest Gold (4)
- 1: Stephen Schwartz (4)
- 1: Richard M. Sherman (4)
- 1: Robert B. Sherman (4)
- 1: Louis Silvers (4)
- 1: Volker Bertelmann (3)
- 1: Frank Churchill (3)
- 1: Elliot Goldenthal (3)
- 1: Erich Korngold (3)
- 1: Bronisław Kaper (3)
- 1: Dario Marianelli (3)
- 1: Rachel Portman (3)
- 1: Harry Sukman (3)
- 1: Gabriel Yared (3)
- 1: John Addison (2)
- 1: Luis Bacalov (2)
- 1: Robert Russell Bennett (2)
- 1: Jay Blackton (2)
- 1: John Corigliano (2)
- 1: Michael Giacchino (2)
- 1: Michael Gore (2)
- 1: W. Franke Harling (2)
- 1: Justin Hurwitz (2)
- 1: A.R. Rahman (2)
- 1: Heinz Roemheld (2)
- 1: Nino Rota (2)
- 1: Leo Shuken (2)

The following composers have been nominated for a Best Original Score Oscar more than once but have yet to garner one. The number of nominations is listed in parentheses. These do not include nominations (or awards) in the Best Original Song category.

==== Deceased ====
- Alex North (14) Received an Academy Honorary Award.
- Walter Scharf (9)
- Roy Webb (7)
- Werner Janssen (6)
- George Duning (5)
- Lalo Schifrin (5) Received an Academy Honorary Award.
- Edward Ward (5)
- Constantin Bakaleinikoff (4)
- Edward H. Plumb (4)
- Frank Skinner (4)
- Frank De Vol (4)
- Richard Rodney Bennett (3)
- George Bruns (3)
- Louis Gruenberg (3)
- Marvin Hatley (3)
- Quincy Jones (3) Has won the Jean Hersholt Humanitarian Award, a special Academy Award.
- Ernst Toch (3)
- Charles Wolcott (3)
- Daniele Amfitheatrof (2)
- Nat W. Finston (2)
- Frederick Hollander (2)
- Jóhann Jóhannsson (2)
- Jack Nitzsche (2) Has won 1 Oscar Award for Original Song.
- Richard Robbins (2)
- Victor Schertzinger (2)
- Meredith Willson (2)

==== Living ====
- Thomas Newman (14)
- Randy Newman (9) Has won 2 Oscar Awards for Original Song.
- James Newton Howard (7)
- Danny Elfman (4)
- George Fenton (4)
- Alberto Iglesias (4)
- Marc Shaiman (4)
- Philip Glass (3)
- Nicholas Britell (3)
- Carter Burwell (3)
- Jonny Greenwood (3)
- Marco Beltrami (2)
- Terence Blanchard (2)
- Patrick Doyle (2)
- David Hirschfelder (2)
- John Powell (2)

== See also ==
- Academy Award for Best Original Song
- BAFTA Award for Best Original Music
- Critics' Choice Movie Award for Best Score
- Golden Globe Award for Best Original Score
- Grammy Award for Best Instrumental Composition
- Grammy Award for Best Pop Instrumental Performance
- Grammy Award for Best Score Soundtrack for Visual Media
- Grammy Award for Best Compilation Soundtrack for Visual Media
- Grammy Award for Best Arrangement, Instrumental or A Cappella
- Saturn Award for Best Music
- List of Academy Award–nominated films
