= I'll Be Yours =

1947 film by William A. Seiter

- Theatrical release poster
- Directed by: William A. Seiter
- Written by: Feliz Johnson (adaptation)
- Screenplay by: Preston Sturges
- Based on: A jó tündér by Ferenc Molnár
- Produced by: Felix Jackson
- Starring: Deanna Durbin; Tom Drake; William Bendix; Adolphe Menjou
- Cinematography: Hal Mohr
- Edited by: Otto Ludwig
- Music by: Frank Skinner
- Production company: Universal Pictures
- Distributed by: Universal Pictures
- Release date: February 2, 1947 (US)
- Running time: 93 minutes
- Country: United States
- Language: English

I'll Be Yours is a 1947 American musical comedy film directed by William A. Seiter and starring Deanna Durbin. Based on the play A jó tündér by Ferenc Molnár, the film is about a small-town girl who tells a fib to a wealthy businessman, which then creates complications. The play had earlier been adapted for the 1935 film The Good Fairy by Preston Sturges.

== Plot ==
Louise Ginglebusher is a young woman from the small town of Cobleskill who comes to New York City to make it in show business. In a café, she's befriended by a kindhearted but ornery waiter, Wechsberg, and meets a bearded struggling attorney, George Prescott. She gets a job as an usherette from Mr. Buckingham, the owner of the prestigious Buckingham Music Hall, who's an old friend of her father.

While working at the Music Hall she meets Wechsberg again, and later when she is accosted by a masher, she gets rid of him by claiming that Wechsberg is her husband. Wechsberg then invites her to come with him the next night when he works at an upscale social gathering at the Savoy Ritz. Louise borrows a gown and comes to the party, where they get her past the headwaiter by claiming she's one of the entertainers. Mingling, she meets the host, J. Conrad Nelson, a philandering meat magnate, who requests that Louise sing a song. She does, so beautifully that Nelson offers to star her in a Broadway musical. To discourage Nelson's obvious physical interest in her, Louise tell him that she's married, whereupon Nelson offers buy her out of her marriage by paying her husband for his loss. Impetuously deciding to do a good deed, she gives Nelson the business card that George Prescott, the struggling lawyer, had given her, and tells him that George is her husband.

When Nelson visits George the next day in his shabby storefront law office, and offers to make him the legal representative for his company, George is suspicious and refuses the offer, but Nelson allays his concerns by telling the ethical young attorney that he needs an honest lawyer as a role model for his staff – the truth is he wants George on his staff so he can keep him occupied while he pursues Louise. Many complications ensue after Louise gets George to shave off his old-man's beard, revealing the handsome young man underneath, and a stroll in the moonlight provokes George to propose marriage to Louise.

== Cast ==
- Deanna Durbin as Louise Ginglebusher
- Tom Drake as George Prescott
- William Bendix as Wechsberg
- Adolphe Menjou as J. Conrad Nelson
- Walter Catlett as Mr. Buckingham
- Franklin Pangborn as Barber
- William Trenk as Captain
- Joan Shawlee as Blonde
- John Phillips as Thug

Two years after making I'll Be Yours, Deanna Durbin retired from film acting. In an interview in 1981, she described her last four films – this one, Something in the Wind (1947), Up in Central Park (1948), and For the Love of Mary (1948) – as "terrible". However, in another interview, her last husband Charles David said she liked making movies except for her last three – "she hated those" (not including I'll Be Yours).

== Songs ==
I'll Be Yours was designed to be a vehicle for Deanna Durbin, and all the songs in it are sung by her.

- "Granada" – words and music by Agustín Lara
- "It's Dream Time" – by Walter Schumann (music) and Jack Brook (lyrics)
- "Cobbleskill School Song" – by Walter Schumann (music) and Jack Brook (lyrics)
- "Love's Own Sweet Song" – by Emmerich Kalman (music) and Catherine Chisholm Cushing and E. P. Heath (lyrics)
- "Sari Waltz"
- "Brahms' Lullaby" – by Johannes Brahms

== Production ==
In December 1940 Universal announced that Durbin would star in Susi a remake of The Good Fairy to be directed by Henry Koster, produced by Joe Pasternak and written by Norman Krasna. She was to make it following Ready for Romance and before The Phantom of the Opera. Plans to make these films were postponed so Durbin could make It Started with Eve. Eventually Pasternak and Koster both left Universal; Ready for Romance was never made, and Durbin elected not to do Phantom of the Opera.

In January 1946 the project was reactivated – Universal announced it would be Durbin's first film back after having a baby, and would be called Josephine. In April Morrie Ryskind was reportedly writing the script. In June 1946 it was announced that William Seiter would direct the movie, now called I'll Be Yours. In August Adolphe Menjou joined the cast. Tom Drake was borrowed from MGM.

Filming started August 13, 1946. It was the first movie made at Universal after they merged with International Pictures. Background scenes were shot on location in New York City. It was released on 2 February 1947. Among other taglines, it was marketed with "Heaven Protects the Working Girl...but who protects the guy she's WORKING to get?"

Tom Drake fell ill during filming and Durbin had to shoot around him.

In November 1946 producer and writer Felix Jackson, who was married to Durbin, asked for and received a release from his contract with Universal. He agreed to supervise the final edit of I'll Be Yours. (Jackson's marriage to Durbin would end and she married Charles David.)

== Other versions and adaptations ==
Before being adapted by Preston Sturges for the 1935 film The Good Fairy, the Molnár play had been presented on Broadway with Helen Hayes playing "Lu" for 151 performances in 1931–1932, with another production playing 68 performances later that year. Preston Sturges used his screenplay for that earlier film as the basis for the 1951 Broadway musical Make a Wish, which had music and lyrics by Hugh Martin.

On January 23, 1950 Lux Radio Theatre broadcast a one-hour radio adaptation of I'll Be Yours, with William Bendix and Ann Blyth. For television, Hallmark Hall of Fame presented The Good Fairy on NBC in 1956, produced by Maurice Evans, directed by George Schaefer, and starring Julie Harris, Walter Slezak and Cyril Ritchard.
