= Christmas Holiday (novel) =

1939 novel

- Author: Somerset Maugham
- Language: English
- Genre: Drama
- Publisher: Heinemann
- Publication date: 1939
- Publication place: United Kingdom
- Media type: Print

Christmas Holiday is a novel by the British writer Somerset Maugham, first published in 1939 by Heinemann. Just before the outbreak of the Second World War a naïve young Englishman travels to Paris to broaden his mind. There he meets a White Russian émigré Lydia, now working as a prostitute. She tells him both of the death of her father during the Russian Revolution and her subsequent marriage in Paris to a man who then murdered his own friend. Despite knowing of his guilt she secretly sends money to him on the prison island in French Guiana because she loves him. The novel was reissued as a Bantam paperback in December 1955 under a new title, Stranger in Paris.

== Film adaptation ==
In 1944 it was adapted into the American film of the same title often classified as a film noir, directed by Robert Siodmak and starring Deanna Durbin and Gene Kelly. While the original story takes place in pre-war Europe, the adaptation shifts the setting to wartime New Orleans in Louisiana.

== Bibliography ==
- Calder, Robin. Somerset Maugham and the Cinema. University of Wisconsin Press, 2024.
- Goble, Alan. The Complete Index to Literary Sources in Film. Walter de Gruyter, 1999.
- Schwartz, Ronald. Houses of Noir: Dark Visions from Thirteen Film Studios. McFarland, 2013.
