= The Good Fairy (1935 film) =

1935 film by William Wyler

- video cover
- Directed by: William Wyler
- Screenplay by: Preston Sturges
- Based on: The Good Fairy; 1930 play by: Ferenc Molnár; Jane Hinton (translation)
- Produced by: Carl Laemmle Jr.
- Starring: Margaret Sullavan; Herbert Marshall; Frank Morgan; Reginald Owen; Alan Hale; Eric Blore; June Clayworth
- Cinematography: Norbert Brodine
- Edited by: Daniel Mandell
- Music by: David Klatzkin; Heinz Roemheld
- Production company: Universal Pictures
- Distributed by: Universal Pictures
- Release dates: January 31, 1935 (New York City); February 18, 1935 (U.S.); March 12, 1935 (Los Angeles)
- Running time: 98 minutes
- Country: United States
- Language: English

The Good Fairy is a 1935 American romantic comedy film written by Preston Sturges, based on the 1930 play A jó tündér by Ferenc Molnár as translated and adapted by Jane Hinton, which was produced on Broadway in 1931. The film was directed by William Wyler and stars Margaret Sullavan, Herbert Marshall, Frank Morgan, and Reginald Owen.

Sturges' screenplay diverges significantly from the Molnár play, and later became the basis for the book of the 1951 Broadway musical Make a Wish. Sturges wrote a scene for a movie-within-the-movie, in which the leading man responds to the leading lady's impassioned pleading with the single word "Go", delivered in varying tones.

== Plot ==
Luisa Ginglebusher has grown up in the Municipal Orphanage, entertaining the other girls with her fairy stories. When Luisa is given a job as an usherette in a Budapest movie palace, the orphanage director Dr. Schultz, herself somewhat inexperienced, sends the young woman into the world with instructions to do a good deed every day and be friendly to everyone, as well as some off screen advice about the male gender.

When Luisa leaves work that evening, Joe, a handsome masher, tries to pick her up and refuses to take no for an answer, backing her into a wall and seizing her by the shoulders. She sees Detlaff, a waiter she met in the theatre, on the sidewalk, and tells Joe he is her husband. It works. Detlaff takes her out for sandwiches, and is charmed by her complete innocence. To give her a glimpse of the beautiful world he sees as a waiter in a fine establishment, he gives her an invitation to an exclusive party—and a dancing lesson.

At the party, Luisa looks lovely in a dress borrowed from the theater; her complete ignorance of the world is played for gentle laughs. Thinking he is a waiter, she chides Konrad, a meat-packing millionaire, for sitting down with her. He is enchanted, but Detlaff is keeping an eye on his protégée and interferes with the attempted seduction. When Luisa finally understands Konrad's intentions (when he scoops her up in his arms in the private dining room) she uses the same ploy that worked with Joe: She tells him she is married. When he demands to know the man's identity, ostensibly in order to give him a job, she picks a name from the phone book. Delighted with her good deed, she tells Detlaff that now she is someone's good fairy.

When Konrad goes to the lucky man, poor but honest lawyer Dr. Max Sporum, and promises a 5-year employment contract and a big bonus, Sporum thinks he has been recommended to the millionaire because of his ethical behavior, diligent hard work and integrity. In fact Konrad plans to send the "husband" to South America so that he will be free to seduce Luisa.

Luisa goes to see Sporum and to tell him the truth. He thinks she is there to deliver the magnificent new pencil sharpener he has just ordered. They hit it off while he sharpens pencils with childlike delight, and she cannot bear to challenge his belief. They spend the day together, shopping for him. She persuades him to buy a bright-colored car and to shave his precious beard. He buys her a "genuine foxine" fur stole, the first present she has ever received. But when she tells him she has to meet a man at his hotel that night, he misunderstands and refuses to see her anymore. Detlaff is also furious that she plans to see Konrad again, but she must ensure Sporum's future. She calls Sporum on the phone and he is all apologies. She tells him to think of her as if she loved him.

Konrad is furious at the sight of the foxine stole, which he says is cheap cat. He is also having difficulty continuing the Lothario scenario. Apparently his behavior was fueled by alcohol. Now sober, he wants to marry her and have children. Detlaff interrupts and literally carries her off, threatening to tell Konrad everything and ruin Sporum's new life. A chase ensues, and Konrad, Luisa and Detlaff end up in Sporum's rooms, where, weeping, she at last explains, more or less coherently. She wishes she were a real good fairy and could wave a wand and undo everything. Sporum soon recovers and he and Luisa are looking forward to a life of poverty together, when Konrad insists on holding him to his contract. Everybody competes for the title of "good fairy". Cut to Luisa coming down the aisle on Sporum's arm, the star on her bridal crown gleaming, while the orphans sing "Faithful and True".

== Cast ==
- Margaret Sullavan as Luisa "Lu" Ginglebusher
- Herbert Marshall as Dr. Max Sporum
- Frank Morgan as Konrad
- Reginald Owen as Detlaff, the Waiter
- Eric Blore as Dr. Metz
- Beulah Bondi as Dr. Schultz
- Alan Hale as Maurice Schlapkohl
- Cesar Romero as Joe
- Luis Alberni as The Barber
- June Clayworth as Mitzi, on-screen actress

Cast notes:

- Future film musical star Ann Miller, who it was once claimed had the world's fastest feet when tap dancing, has an uncredited bit part, her second film appearance.
- Future child star Jane Withers appears as a child in the orphanage sequence. At only nine years old, it was already her seventh film appearance.
- Matt McHugh of the McHugh acting family has a small uncredited part as a moving man.

== Production ==
The Good Fairy was in production from September 13 to December 17, 1934. During filming, director William Wyler and star Margaret Sullavan, for whom writer Preston Sturges had tailored the lead role, clashed frequently, with Sullavan walking off the set several times. When it was brought to Wyler's attention that Sullavan's work was better on the days when they did not fight, he started to go out of his way to avoid clashing with her. Then, on November 25, Wyler and Sullavan eloped to Yuma, Arizona, and got married. Their marriage would last two years.

There were problems between the studio, Universal, and the film's principals. Despite complaints that Wyler was taking too much time because of multiple retakes of scenes involving Sullavan, especially close-ups, Sturges was keeping only a day or so ahead of the shooting, writing new scenes and feeding them to Wyler to shoot "off the cuff". Eventually both Wyler and Sturges were dropped from the studio payroll.

Filming had begun before the script had received formal approval from the Hays Office, which objected to some scenes and many lines in the submitted original, but allowed filming to start on assurance from the studio that changes would be made. The censors particularly objected to a scene in which the head of the orphanage explains the "facts of life" to Luisa before she leaves; to the attempted seduction of the girl by Konrad, the millionaire; and to there being a sofa in the room when Lu goes to Konrad's apartment.

The Good Fairy premiered in New York City on January 31, 1935, in Hollywood on February 12, and went into general release on February 18. It was the first film to be booked into Radio City Music Hall without first being previewed.

== Reception ==
In his February 1, 1935, review, New York Times critic Andre Sennwald found much to praise in the film: "When it is hitting its stride ... (it) is so priceless that it arouses in one the impertinent regret that it is not the perfect fantastic comedy which it might have been ... it proves to be an engaging and often uproariously funny work ... it contains some of the most painfully hilarious merriment of the new year. .. For almost everything that is best in The Good Fairy, you may thank Mr. Morgan's lovely performance ... Reginald Owen is quite perfect as the eccentric waiter. Herbert Marshall is less desperately crazy ... but he manages to be entirely effective. Although Miss Sullavan is not the expert comedienne that her rôle demands, she is frequently able to persuade us that she is at home in a part for which she is temperamentally unfitted. The Good Fairy is so admirable that it causes this department to regret that it is not perfect."

Variety's assessment in the December 31, 1934 issue, was more critical of the film, observing that "Preston Sturges has translated Ferenc Molnar’s dainty stage comedy for the screen, and has turned out a somewhat vociferous paraphrase. Slightly idealistic atmosphere of the original is missing, and in its place is substituted a style of comedy closely akin to slapstick ... Picture is fairly peppered with closeups which, delaying production, brought U and the director, William Wyler, to the mat. These closeups are so beautiful that they seem worthwhile even if a bit profuse. Frank Morgan ... makes his points rapidly and surely. Reginald Owen ... is an excellent foil and contributes some telling pantomime. Sullavan is uneasy in the asylum opening as she does not suggest the child. Later she performs more surely."

In the April 15, 1935, issue of Maclean's, Ann Ross observed: "It is all about an idealistic little orphan, Luisa, who ... believes that the outer world is simply the setting for a larger fairy tale, and when she suddenly finds herself actually out in it she is delightedly ready to accept sables, cheques and motor cars from a rich, middleaged admirer, looking on them as a fairy gift rather than as a basis for practical negotiation. The plot thus skates along very gracefully for an hour and a half over the thinnest possible ice; but in the end Luisa finds riches, happiness and true love without the sacrifice of anything but her time ... a wickedly innocent little anecdote which delicately avoids giving offense."

Writing on March 6, 2012, Ken Hanke praised both Wyler's direction—"it makes you wish the man had turned his hand to comedy more often," and Sullivan's "charming" performance in this "scintillating, but not frequently screened, classic comedy" adding, "Sturges’ gift for blending the sophisticated with the simple, the cynical with the sentimental has rarely been better evidenced than it is here".

Leonard Maltin gives the film 3.5 out of 4 stars: "Sparkling romantic comedy ... Hilarious, charming; movie spoof near beginning is priceless."

As of September 2020, Rotten Tomatoes gives the film an 86 percent fresh rating.

== Other versions and adaptations ==
Before being adapted by Preston Sturges for this film, the Molnár play was presented on Broadway, twice. Helen Hayes played "Lu" in a production that ran at Henry Miller's Theater from November 1931 to April 1932, for a total of 151 performances. A different production, at the Forrest Theater, ran from November 1932 to January 1933, with 68 performances. The play was also the source for the Deanna Durbin film I'll Be Yours in 1947, and Preston Sturges used his screenplay for this film as the basis for the 1951 Broadway musical Make a Wish, which had music and lyrics by Hugh Martin.

Hallmark Hall of Fame presented The Good Fairy on NBC television in 1956. Produced by Maurice Evans and directed by George Schaefer, the show starred Julie Harris, Walter Slezak and Cyril Ritchard.
