= Three Smart Girls =

1936 film by Henry Koster

- Lobby card
- Directed by: Henry Koster
- Screenplay by: Adele Comandini; Austin Parker
- Produced by: Joe Pasternak
- Starring: Barbara Read; Nan Grey; Deanna Durbin; Ray Milland
- Cinematography: Joseph A. Valentine
- Edited by: Ted J. Kent
- Music by: Charles Previn; Heinz Roemheld
- Production company: Universal Pictures
- Distributed by: Universal Pictures
- Release date: December 20, 1936 (US)
- Running time: 84 minutes
- Country: United States
- Language: English
- Budget: $326,000 or $319,107
- Box office: $1,635,800

Three Smart Girls is a 1936 American musical comedy film directed by Henry Koster and starring Barbara Read, Nan Grey, Deanna Durbin (her feature film debut), and Ray Milland. The film's screenplay was written by Adele Comandini and Austin Parker, and is about three sisters who travel to New York City to prevent their father from remarrying. The three plot to bring their divorced parents back together again.

It began an eight-year span of successful Deanna Durbin musicals and spawned two sequels, Three Smart Girls Grow Up and Hers to Hold.

== Plot ==
Three sisters living in Switzerland hear their father is going to marry a younger woman in New York City so they travel there to prevent it.

Their plan involves getting a man to seduce her father's fiancée. They accidentally hire a genuinely rich man who falls for one of the sisters.

== Cast ==
- Binnie Barnes as Donna Lyons
- Charles Winninger as Judson Craig
- Alice Brady as Mrs. Lyons
- Ray Milland as Lord Michael Stuart
- Mischa Auer as Count Arisztid
- Ernest Cossart as Binns
- Lucile Watson as Martha
- John 'Dusty' King as Bill Evans (as John King)
- Nella Walker as Dorothy Craig
- Hobart Cavanaugh as Wilbur Lamb
- Nan Grey as Joan
- Barbara Read as Kay
- Deanna Durbin as 'Penny'

== Production ==
The film was based on an original story. It was purchased for Universal by Adele Comandini. This film became a vehicle for 13 year old Jeanne Dante, who had been on Broadway in Call It a Day. The film was produced by Harry John Brown who had recently joined Universal from Warners.

Joe Pasternak wanted Judy Garland for Durbin's role, but Garland's home studio, MGM, wouldn't loan her out for the picture. However, Joe would produce four Garland films when he moved to MGM. Durbin was picked up from MGM after a short film, Every Sunday co-starring Garland. MGM dropped Durbin's contract freeing her to do Three Smart Girls.

In July 1936, Deanna Durbin appeared alongside Dante, with Henry Koster to direct. By August Dante had dropped out and the three girls were to be played by Durbin, Nan Grey and Barbara Read. Binnie Barnes signed to play the vamp.

Ray Milland was a last-minute replacement for Louis Hayward, who was originally cast, but fell ill shortly of pleurisy four days into filming. The replacement was made in September. The film features Durbin singing the famous waltz song "Il bacio" by composer Luigi Arditi and lyricist Gottardo Aldighieri.

== Reception ==
The film was a huge box office hit.

Variety wrote that that film "is a sentimental comedy and has that rare quality of making an audience feel better for having seen it." It concluded with the comments: "As presented it’s wholesome, funny, and very satisfying. Durbin stands out not only as 'a darling child' personality, but as a winsome little dramatic actress whose talents do not end with an ability to hit the high registers. This is also one of Charles Winninger’s best performances while Binnie Barnes’ light vamp is not overdone. Alice Brady, as the mamma with an eye to a bankroll, just skirts dangerous shoals in overplaying."

In their March, 1937 edition, Modern Screen gave the film a three-star review that praised the dialogue, direction and acting, and predicted success for Deanna Durbin, writing, "This picture won’t take you by surprise as it did the Hollywood preview audience, since by this time you’ve no doubt heard about Deanna Durbin. A Los Angeles schoolgirl, Deanna makes so promising a cinema debut here that she is undoubtedly slated for stardom in short order."

Writing for The Spectator in 1937, Graham Greene gave the film a mixed review, complaining about the sentimentality of the first half of the film, and noting that it is only with the appearance of Precious, her mother, the Hungarian Count, and the English nobleman in the second half of the film that the picture is made. While criticizing Durbin's "consciously girlish" performance, Greene praised the acting of Auer and claimed that the second half of the film was where "some welcome humour of an adult kind creep[s] tardily" into the film.

=== Awards ===
Three Smart Girls received Academy Award nominations for Best Picture, Best Sound (Homer G. Tasker), and Best Original Story.

=== Legacy ===
The film not only made Deanna Durbin a star, but it led to a number of imitations.
