= Because of Him =

1946 film by Richard Wallace

- Theatrical release poster
- Directed by: Richard Wallace
- Screenplay by: Edmund Beloin
- Story by: Edmund Beloin (original story by); Sig Herzig (original story by)
- Produced by: Felix Jackson
- Starring: Deanna Durbin; Charles Laughton; Franchot Tone
- Cinematography: Hal Mohr
- Edited by: Ted J. Kent
- Music by: Miklós Rózsa
- Color process: Black and white
- Production company: Universal Pictures
- Distributed by: Universal Pictures
- Release date: January 18, 1946
- Running time: 88 minutes
- Country: United States
- Language: English

Because of Him is a 1946 American romantic comedy film directed by Richard Wallace and starring Deanna Durbin, Charles Laughton and Franchot Tone.

== Plot ==
Kim Walker is an ambitious waitress who dreams of being on the stage. She tricks respected stage actor John Sheridan into signing a letter of introduction. Thanks to the forged letter, Kim then wins the role of Sheridan's co-star in his next play, much to the disgust of the writer Paul Taylor.

== Cast ==
- Deanna Durbin as Kim Walker
- Charles Laughton as John Sheridan
- Franchot Tone as Paul Taylor
- Helen Broderick as Nora
- Stanley Ridges as Charles Gilbert
- Donald Meek as Martin
- Regina Wallace as Head Nurse
- Charles Halton as Mr. Dunlap
- Douglas Wood as Samual Hapgood

== Production ==
In February 1945 Universal announced that Deanna Durbin and Charles Laughton, who had previously appeared together in It Started with Eve, would be reunited in Catherine the Last, "a contemporary comedy-drama with music". It would be filmed before Merry Merry Marriage recently announced for Dubin. In May Richard Wallace signed to direct.

Franchot Tone, who had appeared opposite Durbin twice before, was signed in August 1945, when the title was changed to Because of Him. Filming started August 15, 1945.

Durbin had married the producer Felix Jackson in June 1945 and at the time of filming, she was pregnant with her first child.

== Reception ==
The New York Times called it "an utterly pointless fable".

Durbin and Jackson later said "We thought that picture came closest to the so-called old-style Durbin story. Yet the New York critics gave us very bad notices. We don't know why."
