= Gus Schilling =

American actor and comedian (1908–1957)

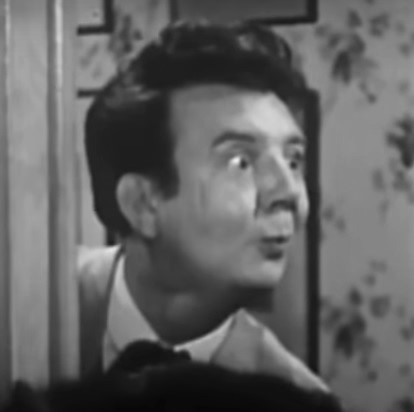
- Schilling in Calendar Girl (1947)
- Born: August Schilling; June 20, 1908; New York City, U.S.
- Died: June 16, 1957 (aged 48); Los Angeles, California, U.S.
- Occupation: Actor
- Years active: 1940–1957
- Partner: Betty Rowland

August "Gus" Schilling (June 20, 1908 – June 16, 1957) was an American film actor who started in burlesque comedy and usually played nervous comic roles, often unbilled. A friend of Orson Welles, he appeared in five of the director's films — Citizen Kane (first screen performance), The Magnificent Ambersons, The Lady from Shanghai, Macbeth and Touch of Evil (final performance, released posthumously).

== Career ==
Born in New York City, Schilling had a rubber face and flustered gestures which made him a natural comedian and he began his career understudying comedy stars Bert Lahr and Joe Penner on Broadway. He soon became a favorite among burlesque comedians, who welcomed him into the burlesque profession. Schilling was in a relationship with burlesque star Betty Rowland and the couple toured in the Minsky burlesque troupe.

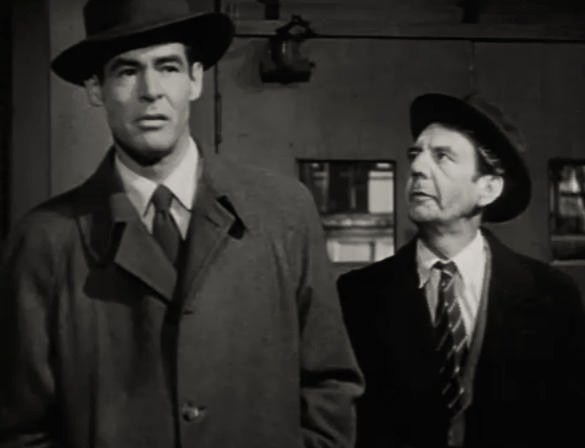
Robert Ryan and Gus Schilling (right) in a screenshot from the trailer for 1951's On Dangerous Ground

Orson Welles saw Schilling in New York and followed him to Florida. There Welles hired Schilling to appear in a stage production featuring several Shakespearean scenes. "I learned my part by taking the script to Welles and having him translate the lines to everyday English," Schilling recalled in 1939. Welles promised Schilling a part in Welles's first motion picture, and kept his promise: Schilling is featured in Citizen Kane (1941). This established Schilling in Hollywood movies as a "nervous" comedian (he plays a jittery symphony conductor in Olsen and Johnson's Hellzapoppin', for example). He also co-starred with character comedian Richard Lane in a series of 11 comedy shorts for Columbia Pictures; the series ran from 1945 to 1950.

== Personal life ==
In July 1945 Schilling was arrested in Hollywood on charges of possession of narcotics. At his trial he testified that he admitted ownership of the marijuana to save his wife from arrest. The all-woman jury acquitted Schilling on November 29.

Schilling and Rowland were often reported as married, but Rowland later said that they never were. His professional career remained successful, and he worked in movies and television throughout the 1950s. His final film, Welles's Touch of Evil, in which he has a brief uncredited appearance, was released in May 1958, nearly a year after his death.

On June 16, 1957, Schilling was found dead of an apparent heart attack in his Hollywood apartment.

== Filmography ==
- Pop Always Pays (1940) – City Dump Watchman (uncredited) (film debut)
- Mexican Spitfire Out West (1940) – Danny – Hotel Desk Clerk (uncredited)
- Dr. Kildare's Crisis (1940) – Orderly Cleaning Window (uncredited)
- Lucky Devils (1941) – Aloysius Grimshaw
- The Penalty (1941) – Parkins, Bank Teller (uncredited)
- The Flame of New Orleans (1941) – Couturier (uncredited)
- Citizen Kane (1941) – John, The Headwaiter / Screening Room Reporter
- The People vs. Dr. Kildare (1941) – Interne at Mike's (uncredited)
- Too Many Blondes (1941) – Elevator Operator
- Mystery Ship (1941) – Waiter (uncredited)
- Ice-Capades (1941) – Dave
- Dr. Kildare's Wedding Day (1941) – Leo Cobb – Orderly (uncredited)
- It Started with Eve (1941) – Raven
- Appointment for Love (1941) – Gus
- Hellzapoppin' (1941) – Orchestra conductor
- Dr. Kildare's Victory (1942) – Leo Cobb
- Broadway (1942) – Joe
- There's One Born Every Minute (1942) – Professor Asa Quisenberry
- The Magnificent Ambersons (1942) – Drug Clerk (uncredited)
- You Were Never Lovelier (1942) – Fernando
- Lady Bodyguard (1943) – Bughouse Sweeney
- The Amazing Mrs. Holliday (1943) – Jeff Adams
- Hi, Buddy (1943) – Downbeat Collins
- Chatterbox (1943) – Gillie
- Presenting Lily Mars (1943) – Scotty – Stage Manager (uncredited)
- Hers to Hold (1943) – Rosey Blake
- Larceny with Music (1943) – Austin J. Caldwell
- Sing a Jingle (1944) – Bucky
- It's a Pleasure (1945) – Bill Evans
- See My Lawyer (1945) – J. Ambrose Winkler aka Winky
- River Gang (1945) – Jafar
- Dangerous Business (1946) – Alexander Pough
- Calendar Girl (1947) – Ed Gaskin
- Stork Bites Man (1947) – Hubert Butterfield
- The Lady from Shanghai (1947) – Goldie
- Macbeth (1948) – A Porter
- The Return of October (1948) – Benny (uncredited)
- Angel on the Amazon (1948) – Dean Hartley
- Bride for Sale (1949) – Timothy
- Our Very Own (1950) – Frank, TV Repairman
- Hit Parade of 1951 (1950) – Studio Guide
- Gasoline Alley (1951) – Joe Allen
- Honeychile (1951) – Window Washer
- On Dangerous Ground (1951) – Lucky
- One Big Affair (1952) – Mr. Rush
- Three for Bedroom "C" (1952) – Train Barber (uncredited)
- She Couldn't Say No (1954) – Ed Gruman
- Executive Suite (1954) – Newsstand Vendor (uncredited)
- Run for Cover (1955) – Doc Ridgeway
- Son of Sinbad (1955) – Jaffir (uncredited)
- Rebel Without a Cause (1955) – Attendant (uncredited)
- Willy (TV series, 1955) – Pincus in episode "Franklin's Shoe Business"
- Glory (1956) – Joe Page
- Bigger Than Life (1956) – Druggist (uncredited)
- Touch of Evil (1958) – Eddie Farnham (uncredited)
