= Mad About Music =

1938 film by Norman Taurog, Bruce Manning, Joe Pasternak

- Theatrical release poster
- Directed by: Norman Taurog
- Screenplay by: Felix Johnson; Bruce Manning
- Story by: Marcella Burke; Frederick Kohner
- Produced by: Joe Pasternak
- Starring: Deanna Durbin; Herbert Marshall; Gail Patrick
- Cinematography: Joseph Valentine
- Edited by: Ted J. Kent
- Music by: Score: Charles Previn; Songs: Jimmy McHugh (music); Harold Adamson (lyrics)
- Production company: Universal Pictures
- Distributed by: Universal Pictures
- Release date: February 1, 1938 (USA)
- Running time: 100 minutes
- Country: United States
- Language: English
- Budget: $858,000

Mad About Music is a 1938 American musical film directed by Norman Taurog and starring Deanna Durbin, Herbert Marshall, and Gail Patrick. Based on a story by Marcella Burke and Frederick Kohner, the film is about a girl at an exclusive boarding school who invents an exciting father. When her schoolmates doubt his existence, she has to produce him. Mad About Music received Academy Award nominations for Best Art Direction, Best Cinematography, Best Music, and Best Original Story.

== Plot ==
Gwen Taylor is a famous Hollywood film star and about to become more famous. On her manager's advice, she has concealed from the press the fact that she's a widow with a fourteen-year-old daughter, Gloria. Gloria lives in a girls-only boarding school in Switzerland.

Gloria never sees her mother and never knew her father, who died when she was just a baby; he was a navy pilot during wartime. She has invented a fictitious 'father', from who she receives letters, which she writes herself. But the other girls are getting curious and Gloria decides to kid them that he's about to visit her. Felice, another girl at the school, is suspicious and tries to prove that her father doesn't exist.

The girls often meet the boys from a nearby boarding school. One of them, Tommy, has a crush on her, and she likes him as well. At a church service, Gloria sings, "Ave Maria (Bach/Gounod)" with a boy's choir.

Gloria needs to quickly find someone to act as her father for a day. She goes to the train station to meet her "father" and the man she picks at random is Richard Todd, an English composer on holiday, accompanied by Tripps, his valet/secretary. Amused at her presumption, he decides to play along, and comes to her school, acting like he really is her father.

Gloria discovers that her mother will be visiting Paris and that Richard is also planning to visit Paris on business. She stows away on a train and manages to persuade Richard to pay her fare.

In Paris, Richard discovers who Gloria's mother is and decides that it's about time for a reunion between her and Gloria. At a press conference, Gwen admits to having a fourteen-year-old daughter. Mother and daughter are tearfully reunited and Gwen is grateful to Richard for bringing Gloria back to her. A budding romance between Gwen and Richard is now obvious and the movie ends with Gloria singing, "A Serenade to the Stars" while the girls from her school, her mother and Richard sit happily together.

== Cast ==
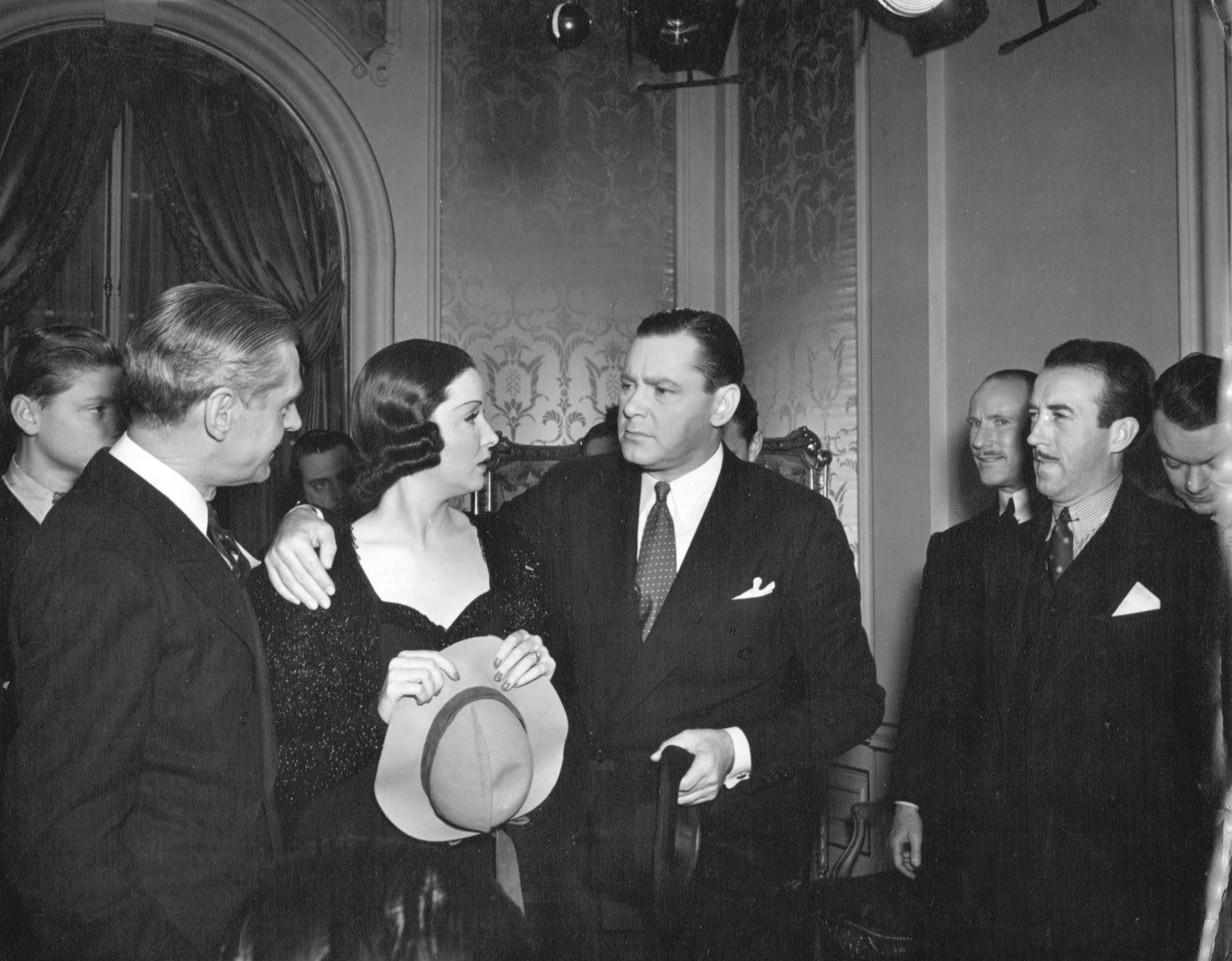
Surrounded by reporters, Gwen Taylor (Gail Patrick) and Richard Todd (Herbert Marshall) answer a barrage of questions following the press conference in Mad About Music

- Deanna Durbin as Gloria Harkinson
- Herbert Marshall as Richard Todd / "Mr. Harkinson"
- Gail Patrick as Gwen Taylor, Gloria's mother
- Arthur Treacher as Tripps
- William Frawley as Dusty Turner
- Marcia Mae Jones as Olga
- Helen Parrish as Felice
- Jackie Moran as Tommy
- Elisabeth Risdon as Annette Fusenot
- Nana Bryant as Louise Fusenot
- Christian Rub as Pierre
- Sid Grauman as himself

== Production ==
The film was announced in March 1937. It was based on an original story by Frederich Kohner and Marcella Burke. The original title was Father Meet Mother.

The producer was Joe Pasternak; Henry Koster, who had directed Durbin's first two films, went on to The Rage of Paris.

In October Norman Taurog signed to direct.

In November Herbert Marshall signed to star. The film would be the first for Durbin's next contract with Universal starting at $1,250 a week with a $10,000 bonus for each film made.

Filming started November 1937. The Vienna Boys Choir, touring the country, appeared in the movie.

The following month Gail Patrick was cast as Durbin's mother.

== Awards and nominations ==
The film received four Academy Award nominations:

- Best Art Direction (Jack Otterson)
- Best Cinematography (Joseph Valentine)
- Best Music Scoring (Charles Previn, Frank Skinner)
- Best Original Story (Marcella Burke, Frederick Kohner)
