= River Gang =

1945 film

- Theatrical release poster
- Directed by: Charles David
- Screenplay by: Leslie Charteris; Dwight V. Babcock (adaptation)
- Based on: Fairy Tale Murder by Charles David and Hugh Gray
- Produced by: Charles David
- Starring: Gloria Jean; John Qualen; Bill Goodwin; Keefe Brasselle; Sheldon Leonard; Gus Schilling; Vince Barnett
- Cinematography: Jerome Ash
- Edited by: Saul A. Goodkind
- Production company: Universal Pictures
- Distributed by: Universal Pictures
- Release date: September 21, 1945
- Running time: 64 minutes
- Country: United States
- Language: English

River Gang is a 1945 American crime film directed by Charles David and written by Leslie Charteris and Dwight V. Babcock. The film stars Gloria Jean, and features John Qualen, Bill Goodwin, Keefe Brasselle, Sheldon Leonard, Gus Schilling, and Vince Barnett. It was released on September 21, 1945, by Universal Pictures.

== Plot ==
Wendy is a teenage girl who lives with her kindly uncle Bill, owner of a curio shop. He has sheltered her from life by instilling in her a firm belief in fantasy and fairy tales, to the point where Wendy feels safe only in the shop, and is afraid to venture outdoors. After Uncle Bill buys a violin from shady character Peg Leg, street-gang leader Johnny connects the violin with the theft of a Stradivarius from a murdered composer. The boss of the crime ring is a masked man known as Raincoat, who has been sending Peg Leg to the curio shop to pawn stolen merchandise. On Raincoat's orders, thugs kidnap Johnny, and Raincoat himself kills Peg Leg. Raincoat tortures Johnny to force him to reveal the street gang's activities. Meanwhile, Wendy discovers the identity of Raincoat. She confronts her fear of the outside world, and joins Johnny's street gang to rescue Johnny and capture the criminals.

== Cast ==
- Gloria Jean as Wendy
- John Qualen as Uncle Bill
- Keefe Brasselle as Johnny
- Bill Goodwin as Mike, policeman
- Sheldon Leonard as Peg Leg
- Gus Schilling as Dopey Charley
- Vince Barnett as Organ Grinder
- Robert Homans as Police Captain
- Jack Grimes as Goofy
- Douglas Croft as Slug
- Mendie Koenig as Butch
- Rocco Lanzo as Fatso
- Jerry Rush as Gang Member (uncredited)

== Production ==
The project was originally conceived by director Charles David and author Hugh Gray as Fairy Tale Murder, a psychological drama intended for Universal's singing star Deanna Durbin, who had been abandoning frothy musicals for grittier dramatic roles. When Durbin rejected the script, it was rewritten by author Leslie Charteris as a tough-teen drama similar to Universal's Little Tough Guys action films. The studio's teenage singing star Gloria Jean took the role intended for Durbin. As Gloria Jean was nearing the end of her contract, Universal used the production, among others, to fulfill her remaining contractual obligations. She left the studio at the end of 1944, but Fairy Tale Murder was shelved for almost a year. It finally reached theaters in late 1945, with the title changed to River Gang. For theaters outside the United States, the film retained the Fairy Tale Murder title.

== Reception ==
Trade reviewers were surprised that this Gloria Jean picture was not an upbeat musical. Showmen's Trade Review commended the star's efforts: "Gloria Jean, without a song but with enough other histrionics, makes this murder mystery acceptable even to those who rely on her singing voice for their entertainment." Box Office Digest congratulated director Charles David: "In this effort his skill with troupers results in an exceptionally fine performance from Gloria Jean; his knowledge of 'theater' gives sustained interest to what is really a rather naive cops-and-robbers yarn. Scriptwriter Leslie Charteris mixed portions of Dr. Jekyll and Mr. Hyde, the Dead End Kids, and Little Orphan Annie to stew up the story."
