= Can't Help Singing =

1944 film by Lewis R. Foster, Frank Ryan

- Theatrical release poster
- Directed by: Frank Ryan
- Screenplay by: Lewis R. Foster; Frank Ryan
- Story by: John D. Klorer; Leo Townsend
- Based on: Girl of the Overland Trail by Samuel J. and Curtis B. Warshawsky
- Produced by: Felix Jackson
- Starring: Deanna Durbin; Robert Paige; Akim Tamiroff
- Cinematography: Woody Bredell; W. Howard Greene
- Edited by: Ted J. Kent
- Music by: Jerome Kern (composer); Yip Harburg (lyricist); H.J. Salter and Edgar Fairchild (music directors)
- Production company: Universal Pictures
- Distributed by: Universal Pictures
- Release date: December 25, 1944
- Running time: 90 minutes
- Country: United States
- Language: English
- Budget: $2,600,000

Can't Help Singing is a 1944 American musical Western film directed by Frank Ryan and starring Deanna Durbin, Robert Paige, and Akim Tamiroff. Based on a story by John D. Klorer and Leo Townsend, the film is about a senator's daughter who follows her suitor West in the days of the California gold rush. Durbin's only Technicolor film, Can't Help Singing was produced by Felix Jackson and scored by Jerome Kern with lyrics by E. Y. Harburg.

The movie was one of the most expensive in Universal's history.

== Plot ==
Set during the early years of the California Gold Rush, the film tells of the adventures of Caroline Frost, the wilful and spoilt daughter of a US Senator. He does not approve of her beau, Lt Robert Latham, of the US cavalry, and persuades President James K. Polk to post Latham to guard gold shipments from the California mines owned by Jake Carstairs.

Caroline travels by train and steamboat and manages to join a wagon-train about to trek overland to the West. She shares a wagon with Johnny (Robert Paige), a debonair but ruthless gambler with whom she falls in love, and two comically inept opportunists, Prince Gregory Stroganovsky and his much put-upon servant Koppa.

At first, she tells Johnny she is engaged to Carstairs. However, no unattached women are allowed to join the wagon train, so Johnny tells everyone she is married to the Prince and she is forced to go along with the ruse.

Eventually, she eventually reaches Sonora, California. Here, her problems are quickly sorted out. After some confusion between Carstairs and his real wife, Caroline decides that she really loves Johnny. Her father, who has followed her, is reconciled.

== Cast ==
- Deanna Durbin as Caroline Frost
- Robert Paige as Johnny Lawlor
- Akim Tamiroff as Prince Gregory Stroganovsky
- David Bruce as Lt. Robert Latham
- Leonid Kinskey as Koppa
- June Vincent as Jeannie McLean
- Ray Collins as Sen. Martin Frost
- Andrew Tombes as Sad Sam
- Thomas Gomez as Jake Carstairs
- Clara Blandick as Aunt Cissy Frost
- Olin Howlin as Bigelow, the Wagonmaster
- George Cleveland as U.S. Marshal
- Chester Conklin as Poker Player (uncredited)
- Heinie Conklin as Waiter (uncredited)
- Edward Earle as President Polk (uncredited)
- Robert Homans as Albert (uncredited)

== Production ==
The film was known as Caroline. Jerome Kern signed to write music in September 1943. In October, Frank Ryan was assigned to direct.

In December Jack Yellen signed to do the script.

In March 1944 the title was changed to Can't Help Singing. David Bruce was cast the same month. Universal had traditionally borrowed leading men to appear opposite Durbin but for this film they used contract players Bruce and Robert Paige.

=== Filming locations ===
- Johnson Canyon, Cascade Falls, Duck Creek, Strawberry Point, Navajo Lake (Utah), and Cedar Breaks in Utah.
- Big Bear Lake, Big Bear Valley, San Bernardino National Forest, California, USA
- Lake Arrowhead, San Bernardino National Forest, California, USA

== Reception ==
=== Critical response ===
The Los Angeles Times called it "delightful". Bosley Crowther of The New York Times said of Durbin's singing as "thoroughly pleasing" and the film "gaudy".

=== Home media ===
Can't Help Singing was released on VHS on January 25, 1997, by Universal Studios Home Entertainment. The film was released on DVD on September 6, 2016, by Universal Studios Home Entertainment.

=== Awards and nominations ===
- 1946 Academy Award Nomination for Best Music, Scoring of a Musical Picture (Jerome Kern and Hans J. Salter)
- 1946 Academy Award Nomination for Best Music, Original Song (Jerome Kern and E.Y. Harburg)

== See also ==
- List of American films of 1944
