= Charles Previn =

American film composer

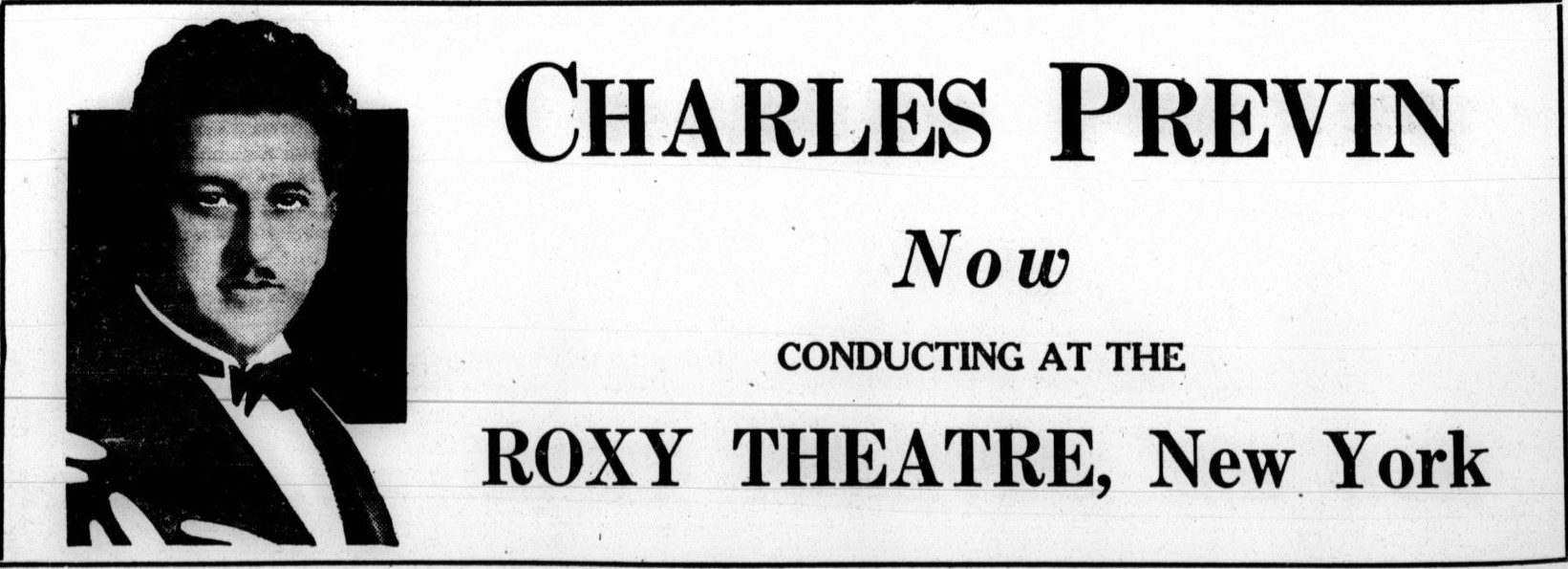
- Ad in the May 1927 Variety
- Born: January 11, 1888; Brooklyn, New York
- Died: September 22, 1973 (aged 85); Los Angeles, California
- Occupation: Film composer

Charles Previn (January 11, 1888 – September 22, 1973) was an American film composer who was active at Universal in Hollywood during the 1940s and 1950s. Before being based in Hollywood, Previn arranged music for over 100 Broadway productions.

Previn was born in Brooklyn to Henrietta Giballe and the rabbi Morris Previn, who a year earlier had emigrated from Graudenz via Glasgow to the United States. He graduated from Brooklyn High School and obtained a bachelor's degree from Cornell University in 1910. He obtained a master's degree from New York College of Music.

From 1936 to 1944, Previn was musical director at Universal, overseeing everything from horror pictures to Arabian Nights fantasies. He was a cousin of the father of German-born composer, pianist, and conductor André Previn and TV and film director Steve Previn (brothers). He died in Los Angeles, aged 85.

== Professional career ==
- Musician and conductor of vaudeville and musical comedy
- Conductor of the St. Louis Municipal Opera
- Conductor of NBC's Camel Pleasure Hour in 1930, featuring cornetist Bix Beiderbecke
- Conductor on the NBC radio series Silken Strings from 1934 through 1936
- 1936–1944 — Musical director, arranger, composer and conductor at Universal. While there, Previn accumulated over 225 films to his credit, including most of Deanna Durbin's films.
- 1944 — Previn began working at other studios
- 1945–1947 — Previn succeeded Ernö Rapée as music director/conductor of the Radio City Music Hall Symphony
- 1947 — Previn returned to Hollywood and worked at Eagle-Lion and MGM
- 1947 — Ithaca Conservatory of Music awarded Previn an honorary doctorate
- 1953 — Previn retired

While at Universal, Previn composed uncredited stock music for several of the studio's releases.

== Partial filmography ==
- The White Monkey (1925)
- Prescription for Romance (1937)
- The Missing Guest (1938)
- The Witness Vanishes (1939)
- Destry Rides Again (1939; musical director)
- Inside Information (1939)
- Missing Evidence (1939)
- Ex-Champ (1939)
- Never Give a Sucker an Even Break (1941)
- Who Done It? (1942)
- Arabian Nights (1942)
- He's My Guy (1943)

== Awards ==
=== Oscar Award ===
- Best Score (1937) — One Hundred Men and a Girl - Musical Director

=== Academy Award nominations ===
- Best Score (1938) — Mad About Music (w. Frank Skinner)
- Best Score (1939) — First Love
- Best Score (1940) — Spring Parade
- Scoring of a Musical Picture (1941) — Buck Privates
- Scoring of a Musical Picture (1942) — It Started With Eve (w. Hans J. Salter)
- Scoring of a Musical Picture (1944) — Song of the Open Road

== Family ==
=== Parents ===
- Father: Rabbi Morris Previn (December 1860, Russia – 16 August 1929, Brooklyn)
- Mother: Henrietta Previn (September 1859, Germany – September 1948, New York, NY)

Morris and Henrietta were married in about 1880. Morris Previn was a rabbi at Ascha-Shorem on 78 Ten Eyck Street in Brooklyn.

=== Siblings ===
- Rosie (December 1882, Germany – May 1948, New York, NY)

MARRIED NAMES
Rose Meyer (married Dr. Joseph H. Meyer)

- Leo Previn (3 August 1884, Graudenz, Germany – February 1954, New York, NY)
- Arthur Gerald Previn (14 February 1886, Germany – July 1969, Falls Church, Virginia)
- Bess (born October 1892, New York City – April 30, 1983, New York City)

MARRIED NAMES
Bess Landau (married Saul Albert Landau 19 November 1914 Manhattan, NY)
Bess Nathanson
Bess Kurtzman

- Jules Previn (23 July 1894, Connecticut – January 1976, Virginia)
- William Oliver Previn (19 June 1896, New York City – 16 August 1978, Washington, D.C.)
- Stanley S. Previn (3 August 1899 – November 1973, Los Angeles)
