= Frank Ryan (filmmaker) =

American film director

Frank Ryan (1907 - January 1, 1948) was an American writer and director of films, best known for his films with Deanna Durbin. In 1942 he was given a producer-director-writer contract at Universal. Ryan died on January 1, 1948, in a train accident near Otterville, Missouri.

== Select filmography ==
- A Girl, a Guy, and a Gob (1940) - writer
- Obliging Young Lady (1942) - writer
- The Mayor of 44th Street (1942) - writer
- Call Out the Marines (1942) - director
- The Amazing Mrs. Holliday (1943) - writer
- Hers to Hold (1943) - director
- Can't Help Singing (1944) - writer, director
- Patrick the Great (1945) - director
- So Goes My Love (1946) - director
