= Charles Henri David =

French film executive (1906–1999)

Charles Henri David (4 January 1906 – 1 March 1999) was a French film executive. He worked as an assistant and production manager for Zoltan Korda for a number of years. He was later the head of Pathé, the French film production and distribution company based in Paris, and worked with Jean Renoir and René Clair. He was with the French Army until the Fall of France in 1940.

He sold a story, "A Fairy Tale Murder", to Universal, who let him direct it as the 1945 film River Gang, one of two films he directed during his career.

He was the third husband to Deanna Durbin, whom he had directed in the 1945 film Lady on a Train. The couple lived in Neauphle-le-Château, a village outside of Paris, starting in late 1949, which continued as their home when they married in December 1950. They had one child together, son Peter.

== Select filmography ==
- La Chienne (1931) – production manager
- Baby's Laxative (1931) – production manager
- American Love (1931) – line producer
- Mam'zelle Nitouche (1931) – production manager
- Fantômas (1932) – production manager
- L'affaire est dans le sac (1932) – production manager
- Trois... six... neuf (1937) – production manager
- Bizarre, Bizarre (1937) – production manager
- The Rebel Son (1938) – producer
- The Four Feathers (1939) – producer's assistant
- The Thief of Bagdad (1940) – associate director
- Rudyard Kipling's Jungle Book (1942) – producer's assistant
- Lady on a Train (1945) – director
- River Gang (1945) – producer, director, story
- La fin des Pyrénées (1970) – executive producer
