= Lady on a Train =

1945 film by Charles David

- Theatrical release poster
- Directed by: Charles David
- Screenplay by: Edmund Beloin; Robert O'Brien
- Story by: Leslie Charteris
- Produced by: Felix Jackson
- Starring: Deanna Durbin; Ralph Bellamy; David Bruce
- Cinematography: Woody Bredell
- Edited by: Ted J. Kent
- Music by: Miklós Rózsa
- Production company: Universal Pictures
- Distributed by: Universal Pictures
- Release date: August 3, 1945 (United States)
- Running time: 94 minutes
- Country: United States
- Language: English

Lady on a Train is a 1945 American crime comedy film noir directed by Charles David and starring Deanna Durbin, Ralph Bellamy, and David Bruce.

Based on a story by Leslie Charteris, the film is about a woman who witnesses a murder in a nearby building from her train window. After she reports the murder to the police, who quickly dismiss her story, she turns to a popular mystery writer to help her solve the crime. The film received an Academy Award nomination for Best Sound.

== Plot ==
San Francisco debutante Nicki Collins goes to visit her aunt in New York City for Christmas. Her father's employee, Haskell, is to meet her and facilitate her stay. Before reaching Grand Central, Nicki's train makes a brief stop and, when she looks up from the book she is reading—a mystery by novelist Wayne Morgan—she witnesses a murder in a nearby building.

Upon arrival, Nicki slips away from Haskell and goes to the police, but the desk sergeant, seeing the novel in her hand, assumes she imagined the crime. She approaches Wayne and pesters him to help her solve the murder. Following Morgan and his fiancée into a theater, Nicki sees a newsreel about the "accidental" death of shipping magnate Josiah Waring—and recognizes him as the murder victim.

Unable to find the crime scene, Nicki sneaks onto the grounds of Waring's Long Island mansion. She is mistaken for Margo Martin, who was expected but has not come. Waring's will is read by his lawyer, Wiggam; Waring's nephews Arnold and Jonathan are not surprised to receive a token $1 inheritance, while the bulk of the estate goes to Margo, Waring's trophy fiancée and a singer at a nightclub he owns. Nicki snoops around the house and absconds with a pair of bloody slippers that disprove the story of an accident. Two conspirators in the murder unsuccessfully try to stop her: Saunders, the nightclub's manager and another heir, and the chauffeur, Danny.

Back with Haskell, Nicki tries again to involve Morgan, phoning him and pretending that an armed man is in her hotel room—unaware that Danny is behind her with a gun. Before he can attack her, she makes another call, to her father. While she is singing to him, Danny spots the slippers and departs, separately attacking Haskell and Morgan. Nicki subsequently assumes they mistakenly attacked each other.

Nicki goes to the nightclub and speaks to Margo in her dressing room, but when Arnold arrives, she locks Margo in a closet, goes on stage, and sings in her place. When freed, Margo tells Saunders she was never interested in the plot and storms off; she is later murdered.

Arnold and Jonathan make romantic overtures to Nicki, but Saunders has her called backstage. He and Danny admit their involvement in the murder and threaten her, but Morgan breaks into the room and rescues Nicki while she takes the slippers back and escapes, returning to the stage and singing again. Later, Morgan learns that one of the people she is sitting with—Arnold, Jonathan, and Wiggam—must be the murderer and manages to warn her. Meanwhile, Morgan's fiancée, thinking he is having an affair with Nicki, breaks up with him.

Danny shoots Saunders dead. Nicki and Morgan leave with the slippers, but are arrested in the morning, based on false information from Danny. Nicki tries to present the slippers, but Morgan's valet has them—and proudly reveals how clean they now are. Arnold, Jonathan, and Haskell all arrive at the jail to bail Nicki out. Arnold says the Warings would like to meet her and drives her to their company's offices, but nobody is there. They discuss the case and he admits that he had motive, but so did Jonathan, Wiggam, and especially Saunders. Frightened, Nicki runs away from him.

Finding Jonathan in the building, Nicki tells him that Arnold is the murderer. They hide in a room, which she realizes is the scene of the crime she saw from the train. Jonathan is the murderer. He confesses his plan to kill her, frame Arnold, and kill Arnold, supposedly while defending Nicki. Arnold slips into the room and grabs Jonathan's gun, but Morgan arrives and mistakes the situation, and Jonathan gets the gun back. As Morgan tries unconvincingly to tell Jonathan that the police will be coming, they do.

Some time later, Nicki and Wayne Morgan are newlyweds on a train. She is enjoying his latest novel so much she tells the porter not to make up their beds until she finishes reading, forcing Morgan to spoil the ending of the novel.

== Cast ==
- Deanna Durbin as Nicki Collins
- Ralph Bellamy as Jonathan Waring
- David Bruce as Wayne Morgan
- George Coulouris as Mr. Saunders, Circus Club manager
- Allen Jenkins as Danny
- Dan Duryea as Arnold Waring
- Edward Everett Horton as Mr. Haskell
- Jacqueline deWit as Miss Fletcher
- Patricia Morison as Joyce Williams
- Elizabeth Patterson as Aunt Charlotte Waring
- Maria Palmer as Margo Martin
- Samuel S. Hinds as Mr. Wiggam
- William Frawley as Desk Sgt. Brennan

== Production ==
In October 1943 Leslie Charteris was reportedly working on the story as a vehicle for Deanna Durbin. Charteris worked on it immediately after his honeymoon. The film was part of an attempt by producer Felix Jackson to diversify Durbin's image, that also included Christmas Holiday.

In September 1944 Charles David, who has just directed The Faries Tale Murder was assigned to direct.

Donald Cook, Robert Paige and Franchot Tone were discussed as possible leading men. In January the job went to David Bruce who had played support in Durbin's previous two films. Felix Jackson says Bruce was cast on the strength of his work in Christmas Holiday.

There was some second unit location work done on the New York subway in November 1944. Filming was to have begun December 15, 1944, but did not start until January 17, 1945.

The cast also included Dan Duryea and Ralph Bellamy, who was borrowed from Hunt Stromberg.

=== Soundtrack ===
- "Silent Night" (Joseph Mohr, Franz Gruber, John Freeman Young)
- "Give Me a Little Kiss" (Roy Turk, Jack Smith, Maceo Pinkard)
- "Night and Day" (Cole Porter)

=== Novelization ===
A novelization by Leslie Charteris adapting the screenplay was published by Shaw Press in 1945. It has the distinction of being the first fiction novel by Charteris that did not feature Simon Templar to be published since the early 1930s, and the last such publication of his career as (except for some non-fiction) he only published books featuring Templar thereafter.

== Legacy ==
Agatha Christie's 4:50 from Paddington, which was published in 1957, borrows an identical opening premise from Lady on a Train, where a woman witnesses a murder from a train window and is initially disbelieved because she was reading a murder mystery novel at the time. In 1990, Charteris's story was adapted for the pilot episode of the CBS television series Over My Dead Body.

The scenario of a lady witnessing a murder from a train was used as the basis for the Return of the Saint episode "Signal Stop" starring Lady on a Train writer Leslie Charteris’ character Simon Templar in the title role. Return of the Saint executive producer Robert S Baker, said that Leslie Charteris was surprised on reading the "Signal Stop" script, noting its similarity with Lady on a Train. It is not known whether "Signal Stop" writer John Kruse had seen the film prior to writing the episode.

In the 1960 Peter Gunn episode "The Passenger", a man witnesses a murder in a hotel room from a bus window and is initially disbelieved.

== Awards and nominations ==
- 1946 Academy Award Nomination for Best Sound (Bernard B. Brown)
