= Let's Make Music =

1941 film by Leslie Goodwins

- Directed by: Leslie Goodwins
- Written by: Nathanael West
- Produced by: Howard Benedict; Lee Marcus
- Starring: Bob Crosby; Jean Rogers; Elisabeth Risdon
- Cinematography: Jack MacKenzie
- Edited by: Desmond Marquette
- Music by: Roy Webb
- Production company: RKO Radio Pictures
- Distributed by: RKO Radio Pictures
- Release date: January 17, 1941
- Running time: 84 minutes
- Country: United States
- Language: English

Let's Make Music is a 1941 American musical film directed by Leslie Goodwins and starring Bob Crosby, Jean Rogers and Elisabeth Risdon. It was produced by RKO Pictures and written by Nathanael West. The film's songs include the classic "Big Noise from Winnetka".

== Plot ==
Newton High music teacher Malvina Adams (Risdon) is asked to retire since attendance in her classes keeps dropping each year. Trying to prove she's still got it, Adams composes a school fight song which finds its way into the hands of bandleader Bob Crosby (playing himself) who turns it into an overnight hit. Though her niece Abby (Rogers) protests, Malvina travels to New York to perform her song with Bob's band, while her niece falls for the bandleader. The newness of the song fades quickly though, and Malvina tries to write one more hit song before finally giving up and returning to Newton.

== Cast ==
- Bob Crosby as himself
- Jean Rogers as Abby Adams
- Elisabeth Risdon as Malvina Adams
- Joseph Buloff as Joe Bellah
- Joyce Compton as Betty
- Benny Bartlett as Tommy
- Louis Jean Heydt as Mr. Stevens
- Bill Goodwin as himself
- Frank Orth as Mr. Botts
- Grant Withers as Headwaiter
- Willa Pearl Curtis as Carolyn
- Walter Tetley as Eddie
- Betty Rowland as Betty, Chorus Girl
- Renee Godfrey as Helen, Chorus Girl
- Jimmy Conlin as Jim, the Pianist
- Jack Norton as Mr. Orton, a Drunk
- Benny Rubin as Music Publisher
- Gale Sherwood as High School Singer

== Production notes ==
In April 1940 Nathanael West, then a contract writer at RKO Pictures, was asked to work on a script, tentatively named Malvina Swings It, which writer Charles Roberts failed to complete satisfactorily. After working on the screenplay for almost ten nonconsecutive weeks, West had turned it into Let's Make Music, which hoped to benefit from Bob Crosby's popularity. The rewriting was so significant West received solo screenwriting credit.

== Reception ==
The reviewer from The New York Times commented that, "no doubt worse movies have been made," but was at a loss to name any. The Film Daily critic called it, "a picture for all situations, ages, and types, although it is conceivable that some inflexible devotees of classical music may be holdouts, and term it esthetically 'gross.' But it's plenty gross for the box offices."
