= Christmas Holiday =

1944 film by Robert Siodmak, Felix Jackson

- Theatrical release poster
- Directed by: Robert Siodmak
- Screenplay by: Herman J. Mankiewicz
- Based on: Christmas Holiday by W. Somerset Maugham
- Produced by: Felix Jackson
- Starring: Deanna Durbin; Gene Kelly
- Cinematography: Woody Bredell
- Edited by: Ted J. Kent
- Music by: Hans J. Salter
- Color process: Black and white
- Production company: Universal Pictures
- Distributed by: Universal Pictures
- Release date: June 28, 1944 (New York City)
- Running time: 93 minutes
- Country: United States
- Language: English
- Box office: over $2 million

Christmas Holiday is a 1944 American film noir crime film directed by Robert Siodmak and starring Deanna Durbin and Gene Kelly. Based on the 1939 novel of the same name by W. Somerset Maugham, the film is about a woman who marries a Southern aristocrat who inherited his family's streak of violence and instability and soon drags the woman into a life of misery. After he is arrested, the woman runs away from her husband's family, changes her name, and finds work as a singer in a New Orleans dive. The film received an Academy Award nomination for Best Musical Score for Hans J. Salter.

== Plot ==
On Christmas Eve in New Orleans, U.S. Army officer Charlie Mason meets beautiful Maison Lafitte hostess "Jackie" (whose real name is Abigail Manette). She tells him, in flashbacks, the story of the decline of her marriage with the charming but unbalanced Robert Manette. When her husband kills a bookie, his controlling mother tries to cover it up. When he is caught, she and her son blame Abigail. Abigail, feeling guilty when her husband receives a life sentence, becomes a bar hostess. Meanwhile, Robert escapes from jail and comes to see Abigail, but he is shot by police and dies in her arms, leaving her to start again.

== Cast ==
- Deanna Durbin as Jackie Lamont / Abigail Martin
- Gene Kelly as Robert Manette
- Richard Whorf as Simon Fenimore
- Dean Harens as Lieutenant Charlie Mason
- Gladys George as Valerie De Merode
- Gale Sondergaard as Mrs. Manette
- David Bruce as Gerald Tyler

== Production ==
=== Novel ===
The film was based on a novel by W. Somerset Maugham published in 1939. The New York Times called the novel "surprisingly talky."

The book became a best seller. By the end of the year, it had sold over 100,000 copies in America.

Walter Wanger wanted to turn it into a film in 1939, but the Hays Office rejected his proposal, as they felt the novel's story about an Englishman meeting a beautiful Russian prostitute was too sordid.

=== Deanna Durbin ===
In March 1943, Universal bought the screen rights to the book as a vehicle for Deanna Durbin. The movie was part of a specific plan by producer Felix Jackson to broaden the sort of films Durbin was making - it would be followed by her first color film, Caroline, then a mystery, Lady on a Train, and then a film with Charles Boyer.

Durbin, usually the girl next door in Universal Pictures musicals, plays a naif who falls for him and sticks with him even knowing he's a killer. Christmas Holiday was the first film Durbin starred in that had not been specifically written for her.

In August 1943, Durbin called the movie "my dramatic debut." She would only sing two numbers. "Deanna did always have sex appeal" said Jackson. "I don't believe a star can be a star without it. Of course each of us has a different opinion on the matter."

Screenwriter Herman J. Mankiewicz changed the setting from a Paris brothel to a nightclub in New Orleans and the main character was changed from a prostitute to a more ambiguous nightclub singer and hostess.

Mankiewicz was fired while writing the screenplay when Universal executives saw him drunk on the studio lot. A week later the writer walked into Jackson's office and said "Felix, don't you think Herman Mankiewicz drunk is still better than Dwight Taylor sober?" Jackson rehired him. Mankiewicz considered the screenplay among his 1940s successes of which he was most proud.

Universal loaned Turhan Bey to MGM in exchange for Gene Kelly who played her husband. Kelly was signed in October 1943. Dean Harens who had been a success on Broadway signed to make his feature film debut. Gale Sondergaard joined the film in November.

The director was Robert Siodmak who said the film had "a good plot (though the studio always wanted to change my psychological endings into physical ones, when the Hays office didn't intervene...) and interesting casting Gene Kelly in such a way as to suggest a sinister quality behind a rather superficial charm."

=== Shooting ===
Filming started November 15, 1943 and finished on February 12, 1944.

Siodmark said that Durbin "is a real actress. For five days she had to cry and for five days she cried and cried. But each day at 4 pm sharp and would cry no more. It was amazing. That is a real actress for you."

Siodmak later said that Durbin "was difficult: she wanted to play a new part but flinched from looking like a tramp: she always wanted to look like nice wholesome Deanna Durbin pretending to be a tramp. Still, the result was quite effective."

Durbin said during filming: "I'll be satisfied if they come out saying I gave a good performance."

In February 1944, Universal signed Durbin to a new exclusive six-year contract.

=== Soundtrack ===
Durbin performs two musical numbers in Christmas Holiday: "Spring Will Be a Little Late This Year" written for the film by Frank Loesser, and also the Irving Berlin ballad "Always". The film also features excerpts from Tristan und Isolde ("Liebestod") by Richard Wagner, "Silent Night, Holy Night" by Franz Xaver Gruber, and Latin chant for the Midnight Mass scene (which was footage of an actual Tridentine Mass at the Cathedral of Saint Vibiana).

== Release ==
Christmas Holiday premiered in New York City on June 28, 1944.

== Reception ==
=== Box office ===
By July 1944, the film had made more than $2 million at the US box office, making it the highest-grossing film of Durbin's career so far. It was also Universal's most successful film of the year, overtaking Arabian Nights, which made $1.7 million. Universal said that the average gross of a Durbin film was $1,250,000.

"Oddly enough it did very well," said Siodmak. "I suppose everyone was so interested to see what Deanna Durbin would be like in a dramatic role. However she never tried again."

=== Critical response ===
==== Contemporaneous ====
The film received mixed reviews. In his review for The New York Times, Bosley Crowther called the story "the oldest sort of hat—the kind of dramatic farrago that was being played by faded stars ten years ago." Crowther wrote that it was "really grotesque and outlandish what they've done to Miss Durbin in this film"—forced to play a role that is "a figment within a moody and hackneyed yarn." Crowther criticized Mankiewicz' screenplay, which has "but the vaguest resemblance to the Somerset Maugham novel on which it is 'based'". Although not blaming Durbin for the film's shortcomings, Crowther is severe in his criticism of her performance:

As the piteously wronged young lady, Miss Durbin does all that she can to suggest an emotional turmoil. But her efforts are painfully weak. Her speaking voice is girlish and empty of quality, and her gestures of shock and frustration are attitudinized.

Crowther is no more charitable towards Gene Kelly, who "performs her no good husband in his breezy, attractive style, which is thoroughly confusing, considering the character that he is supposed to be."

==== Modern assessment ====
The film has received generally positive reviews from modern day critics. The review aggregator Rotten Tomatoes reports that 78% of critics gave the film a positive review based on nine reviews.

J. Hoberman of Tablet gave the film a glowing review, saying: "Christmas Holiday is one of the most Teutonic of Hollywood movies—a heritage borne out by its moody lighting, expressionist compositions, a soupçon of Krafft-Ebing, and long excerpts from Wagner's “Liebestod.”"

== Legacy ==
Durbin later said in an interview with Films in Review that Christmas Holiday was her "only really good film". Christmas Holiday is considered one of the bleakest films noir of the 1940s, and one of Siodmak's most personally realized films.

== See also ==
- List of American films of 1944
