= Chatterbox (1943 film) =

1943 film by Joseph Santley

- Theatrical release poster
- Directed by: Joseph Santley
- Screenplay by: Frank Gill Jr. George Carleton Brown
- Produced by: Albert J. Cohen
- Starring: Joe E. Brown; Judy Canova; Rosemary Lane; John Hubbard; Gus Schilling; Chester Clute
- Cinematography: Ernest Miller
- Edited by: Ernest J. Nims
- Music by: Paul Sawtell; Walter Scharf; Marlin Skiles
- Production company: Republic Pictures
- Distributed by: Republic Pictures
- Release date: April 27, 1943
- Running time: 77 minutes
- Country: United States
- Language: English

Chatterbox is a 1943 American comedy film directed by Joseph Santley and written by Frank Gill Jr. and George Carleton Brown. The film stars Joe E. Brown, Judy Canova, Rosemary Lane, John Hubbard, Gus Schilling and Chester Clute. It was released on April 27, 1943 by Republic Pictures.

== Cast ==
- Joe E. Brown as Rex Vane
- Judy Canova as Judy Boggs
- Rosemary Lane as Carol Forrest
- John Hubbard as Sebastian Smart
- Gus Schilling as Gillie
- Chester Clute as Wilfred Peckinpaugh
- Anne Jeffreys as Vivan Gale
- Emmett Vogan as Roger Grant
- George Byron as Joe
- Billy Bletcher as Black Jake
- The Mills Brothers as Quartet
- Spade Cooley as Band Leader / Fiddle Player
