= One Hundred Men and a Girl =

1937 film by Henry Koster

- Theatrical release poster
- Directed by: Henry Koster
- Screenplay by: Charles Kenyon; Bruce Manning; James Mulhauser
- Story by: Hanns Kräly
- Produced by: Joe Pasternak; Charles R. Rogers
- Starring: Deanna Durbin; Leopold Stokowski
- Cinematography: Joseph A. Valentine
- Edited by: Bernard W. Burton
- Music by: Charles Previn; Frank Skinner; Leopold Stokowski
- Color process: Black and white
- Production company: Universal Pictures
- Distributed by: Universal Pictures
- Release date: September 5, 1937 (USA)
- Running time: 84 minutes
- Country: United States
- Language: English
- Budget: $762,000 or $733,000
- Box office: $2,270,200

One Hundred Men and a Girl (styled 100 Men and a Girl in advertising) is a 1937 American musical comedy film directed by Henry Koster and starring Deanna Durbin and the maestro Leopold Stokowski. Written by Charles Kenyon, Bruce Manning, and James Mulhauser from a story by Hanns Kräly, the film is about the daughter of a struggling musician who forms a symphony orchestra consisting of his unemployed friends. Through persistence, charm, and a few misunderstandings, they are able to get famed conductor Leopold Stokowski to lead them in a concert, which leads to a radio contract. One Hundred Men and a Girl was the second of three motion pictures featuring Stokowski, and is also one of the films for which Durbin is best remembered as an actress and a singer.

== Plot ==
John Cardwell, a trombone player, is only one of a large group of unemployed musicians. He tries unsuccessfully to gain an interview and audition with Leopold Stokowski, but not to disappoint his daughter, Patricia (Patsy), he tells her that he has managed to get the job with Stokowski's orchestra. Patsy soon learns the truth after sneaking into a rehearsal, and also learning that her father, desperate for rent money, has used some of the cash in a lady's evening bag he has found to pay his debts.

The irrepressible and wilful Patsy seeks an interview with Mrs. Frost, whose bag it was, and confesses her father's actions. Mrs. Frost, a society matron and wife of rich radio station owner John R. Frost, lightheartedly offers to sponsor an orchestra of unemployed musicians. Taking her at her word, Patsy and her father recruit 100 musicians, rent a garage space and start to rehearse. Realizing that Patsy took her seriously, Mrs. Frost flees to Europe.

Mr. Frost tells John and his friends that he will not sponsor them, as they had supposed, unless they can attract a well-recognized guest conductor to give them a 'name' and launch them on their opening night.

Patsy, undaunted, sets out to recruit none other than Leopold Stokowski to be that conductor. Stokowski at first definitely refuses—though when Patsy sings as the orchestra is rehearsing Mozart's "Alleluia" from Exsultate, jubilate, he strongly suggests that she seek professional voice training and eventual representation.

By mistake, Patsy conveys the story to a newspaper music critic that Stokowski will conduct an orchestra of unemployed musicians, and that John R. Frost would broadcast the concert on the radio. When the story breaks, Frost protests his embarrassment to his friends, but they suggest valuable publicity would result. Frost immediately signs the one-hundred-man orchestra to a contract, though Patsy tries to tell them that Stokowski has not agreed.

Stokowski is astonished and offended at the news, but Patsy enters Stokowski's palatial house surreptitiously, along with the entire orchestra. She apologizes to him and insists that he listen to the players. The conductor is so moved by their performance of Liszt's Hungarian Rhapsody No. 2 that he postpones a European tour and agrees to the engagement.

The concert is a rousing success for everyone, especially when Patsy, called upon to make a speech, instead agrees to sing the "Brindisi" (Drinking Song) from Verdi's opera La traviata.

== Cast ==
- Deanna Durbin as Patricia "Patsy" Cardwell
- Adolphe Menjou as John Cardwell
- Leopold Stokowski as himself
- Eugene Pallette as Mr. John R. Frost, the eventual sponsor of the "One Hundred Men"
- Alice Brady as his wife, Mrs Frost
- Alma Kruger as Mrs. Tyler, John Cardwell's landlady
- Mischa Auer as Michael Borodoff, a flutist and one of John Cardwell's neighbors
- Billy Gilbert as the owner of the garage where the "One Hundred Men" rehearse
- Jed Prouty as Tommy Bitters, a man engaged in a good-natured war of pranks with John R. Frost. (Frost suspects Bitters of planting the Stokowski story in the newspaper until Patsy confesses her role to Stokowski.)
- Jack Smart as Marshall, Leopold Stokowski's doorkeeper
- Frank Jenks as a taxi driver who keeps a running tab for Patsy and later calls it an "investment" in her singing voice
- Gerald Oliver Smith As Stevens, the butler

== Production ==
=== Background ===
"Everybody said you can't top Three Smart Girls", said Pasternak years later. "I said you can top anything as long as you're honest, you don't fool yourself, you get the right subject and you create a public taste for it."

The film was originally called 120 Men and One Girl and was announced in December 1936. It was based on an original story and screenplay by Hans Kraly.

Leopold Stokowski was, at the time of the film's release, co-conductor of the Philadelphia Orchestra with Eugene Ormandy. Political and artistic differences with the orchestra's board had already led Stokowski to allow Ormandy to assume a greater leadership role at the orchestra and eventually would lead Stokowski to break with the orchestra entirely. This might explain why the city in which the film is set, and by extension Stokowski's "regular" orchestra, is never positively identified in the film. The music was recorded in multi-channel stereophonic sound but released in monaural sound; three years later Stokowski and the Philadelphia Orchestra appeared in the first feature film to be presented in stereo, Fantasia. Jane Barlow, ballerina and a student of Nijinska, was a body double for Deanna Durbin in this film.

Casting Stokowski was reportedly Durbin's idea. Stokowski signed with Universal to make the film in February 1937, reportedly for $80,000. Paramount objected, insisting they had an exclusive contract with the conductor, but it was at tht time only verbal; Stokowski was permitted to complete this film for Universal, and his contract with Paramount was soon executed. Filming started in March.

=== Soundtrack ===
- "Symphony No. 5 in E minor: Fourth Movement" (Pyotr Ilyich Tchaikovsky)--pre-recorded in Philadelphia by Stokowski, leading Philadelphia Orchestra musicians
- "It's Raining Sunbeams" (Friedrich Hollaender, Sam Coslow)--recorded in Hollywood by Deanna Durbin with Charles Previn conducting studio orchestra
- "Rakoczy March" (Hector Berlioz)--pre-recorded in Philadelphia by Stokowski, leading Philadelphia Orchestra musicians
- "A Heart That's Free" (Alfred G. Robyn, Thomas Railey)--recorded in Hollywood by Deanna Durbin with Charles Previn conducting studio orchestra
- "Zampa, ou la fiancée de marbre: Overture" (Ferdinand Hérold)--recorded in Hollywood by Charles Previn conducting studio orchestra
- "For He's a Jolly Good Fellow" (Traditional)--recorded in Hollywood by Charles Previn conducting studio orchestra
- "Lohengrin: Prelude to Act III" (Richard Wagner)--pre-recorded in Philadelphia by Stokowski, leading Philadelphia Orchestra musicians
- "Alleluja" from the motet "Exsultate, jubilate" (K.165) (Wolfgang Amadeus Mozart)--orchestra track pre-recorded in Philadelphia by Stokowski, leading Philadelphia Orchestra musicians; Deanna Durbin's singing added in Hollywood

=== Network Radio "Preview" ===
On 27 August 1937, about a week before the film's Philadelphia premiere, Durbin and Stokowski appeared on the ABC radio network's "Hollywood Hotel" program, previewing their new movie and its music.

== Reception ==
The film opened to highly favorable critical reviews and is remembered as a hit. Of all the elements of the film, Deanna Durbin's ability to both sing and act drew the highest praise.

The Philadelphia Inquirer critic viewed the premiere and was pleased: “What some previous pictures have done in getting operatic interludes onto the screen, ‘100 Men and a Girl’ does—and does with surprising dignity and considerable resourcefulness—for the gold mine of symphonic literature. However one may fret and fume, if one wants to, about the implausible aspects of this film fairy tale, the music it brings is a revelation of the fact that there is a meeting place in the move No Man's Land for two widely separated art forms....It is no secret that the Philadelphia Orchestra conductor's interest in film-making has brought criticism from various staid and prejudiced corners. ‘Undignified’ and ‘cheap’ are only two of the words that have been used. Unflattering as they are, we’ve heard even stronger adjectives applied. Yet...when the picture's very first audience broke into spontaneous applause at its conclusion, we had the inescapable feeling that Stokowski would have felt himself completely justified and that he would willingly endure the criticism of the few for the grateful commendation of the many.”

=== Awards and honors ===
The film was nominated for the Academy Award for Best Picture. In addition, Charles Previn, in his role as head of the music department for Universal Pictures, won the Academy Award for Original Music Score. (No specific composer credit was ever specified.) Previn's scoring consisted of using two original songs (by Sam Coslow and Friedrich Hollaender) and a carefully chosen selection of music from classical symphonic works and operas. The other three awards for which this film was nominated were Best Film Editing, Best Sound Mixing (Homer G. Tasker), and Best Original Story.

The film is recognized by American Film Institute in these lists:

- 2006: AFI's Greatest Movie Musicals – Nominated
