= Betty Rowland =

American actress and dancer (1916–2022)

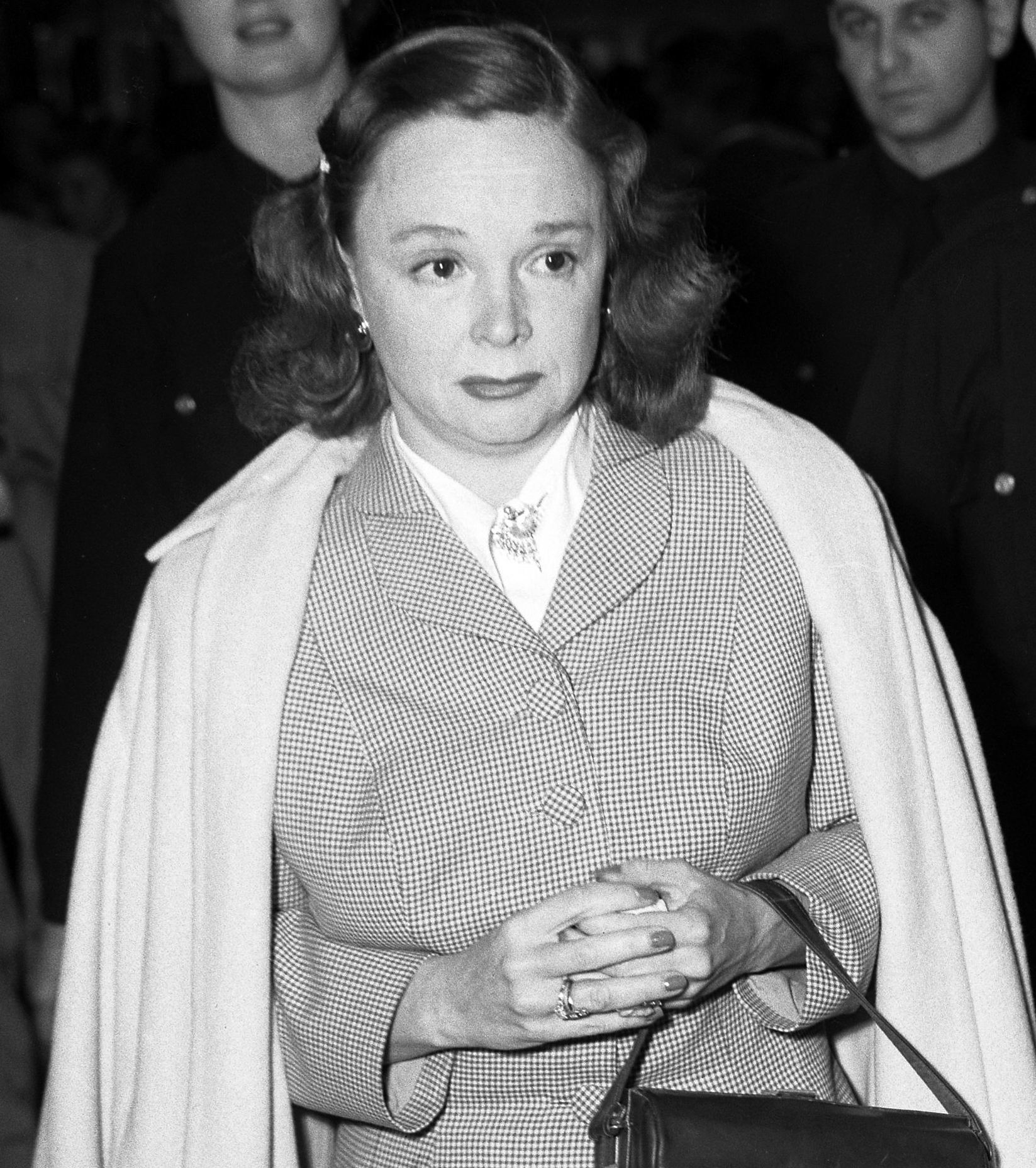
- Rowland in 1952
- Born: Betty Jane Rowland; January 23, 1916; Columbus, Ohio, U.S.
- Died: April 3, 2022 (aged 106); Culver City, California, U.S.
- Other names: Ball of Fire
- Occupations: Actress; dancer
- Spouse: Owen S. Dalton (m. 1956; div. 1963)
- Partner: Gus Schilling

Betty Jane Rowland (January 23, 1916 – April 3, 2022) was an American burlesque dancer and actress, with a career spanning over eight decades. She was the last living performer of the "Golden Age of Burlesque" era.

== Early life ==
Rowland was born to Alvah and Ida Rowland on January 23, 1916, in Columbus, Ohio. Her father was an accountant who lost his job during the Great Depression. Betty and her sisters Dian and Roz Elle all started out as dancers in vaudeville before making the transition into burlesque.

== Career ==
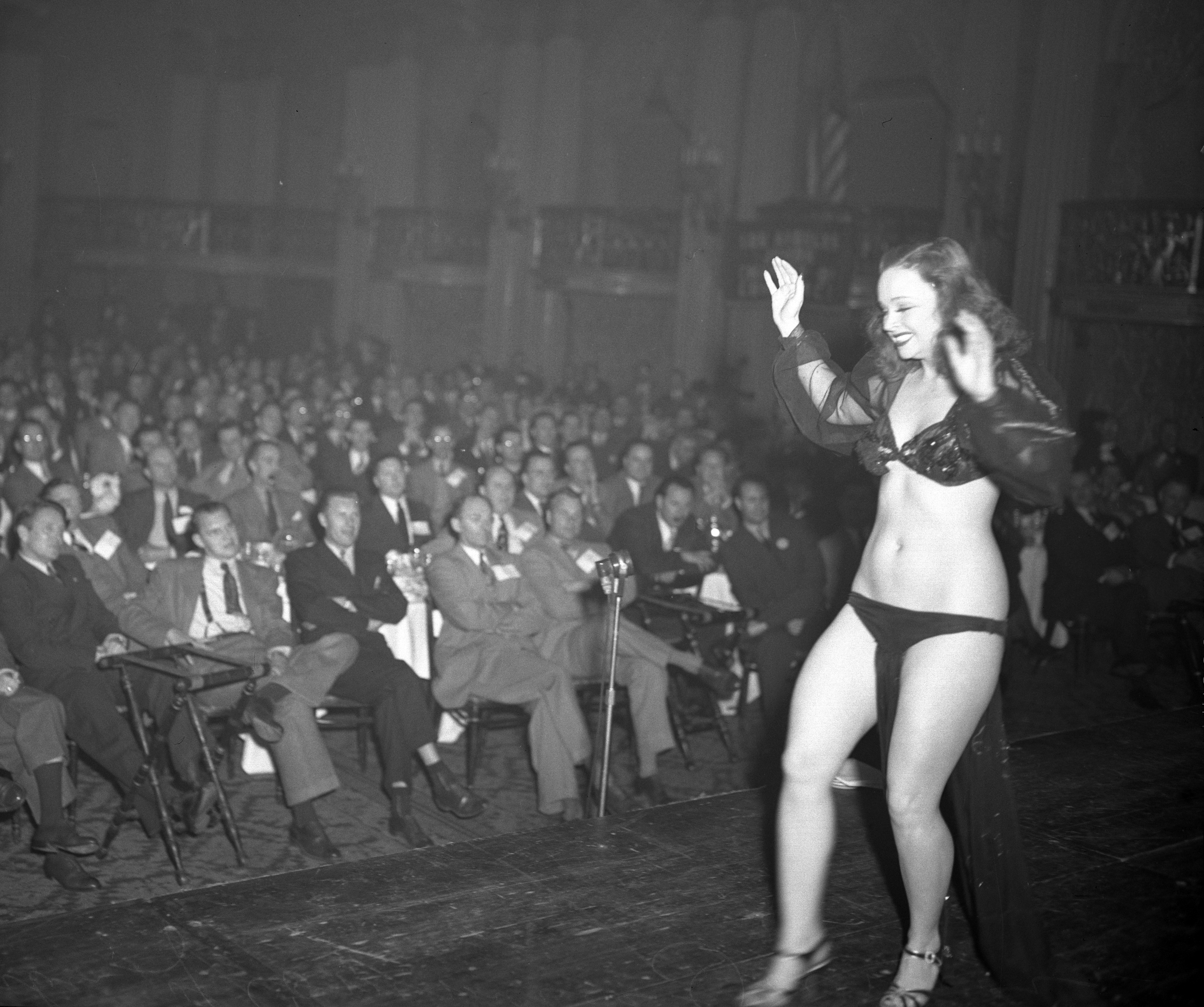
Rowland performing, c. 1946

Betty Rowland performed at the famous club Minsky's in New York City, where she earned the nickname "Ball of Fire" from both her flaming red hair and hot and fast style of dancing. She moved to Los Angeles, California in 1938. By 1941, the fresh-faced Rowland was established as a burlesque star. Unlike other exotic dancers who cultivated an aloof, statuesque attitude on stage to project a distant sort of glamour, Betty Rowland had a much more vivacious style, in which she was constantly smiling and prancing across the stage.

She attempted to sue producer Samuel Goldwyn for using "Ball of Fire" as the title for a Howard Hawks film starring Barbara Stanwyck and Gary Cooper. She also appeared in some Hollywood movies such as Let's Make Music (1940), Spavaldi e innamorati (1959), Love & Kisses (1965), A Time for Dying (1969). In the 1960s, Rowland assumed ownership of a bar in Santa Monica, California; the bar was bought and renamed by investors in the 1990s, but she continued to work there as a hostess until at least 2009, when she was 93.

She appeared in numerous documentaries in 2004 and 2010, also in a video named Forbidden Cinema: Volume 5 – Lost Blue Classics (2014).

== Personal life ==
Rowland was married to businessman Owen S. Dalton from 1956 to their divorce in 1963. She was in a relationship with burlesque and film comedian Gus Schilling, and they were often referred to as spouses, but Rowland later said that they never married. In her later years she helped run various bars, worked as a hostess at Alain Giraud's French restaurant Anisette Brasserie in Santa Monica, California. In 2009, Rowland was living in an apartment in Brentwood, Los Angeles. She died at a care facility in Culver City, California on April 3, 2022, at the age of 106. Her death was announced nearly 3 months later on June 30.

== Filmography ==
=== Films ===
- Let's Make Music (1940) – Betty, Chorus Girl
- Spavaldi e innamorati (1950) – Dorothy
- Love & Kisses (1965) – Dancer
- A Time for Dying (1969) – Dancer
- Sunset Strip (2012)
- Forbidden Cinema: Volume 5 – Lost Blue Classics (2014)

=== Documentaries ===
- The Last First Comic (2010)
- Behind the Burly Q (2010)
- Pretty Things (2005)
- Striptease: The Greatest Exotic Dancers of All Time (2004)
- Gypsy (TV Series 1965)
- International Burlesque (1950)
