= The Good Fairy (play) =

Play written by Ferenc Molnár

The Good Fairy (A jó tündér)
- Original language: Hungarian
- Written by: Ferenc Molnár; Jane Hinton (translation)
- Characters: Lu; Dr. Sporum; Konrad; Mr. Metz; Karoline; Head Waiter others
- Genre: Romantic comedy
- Setting: A private dining room in a hotel; Dr. Sporum's office

Premiere
- Date: November 1931
- Place: New York City

Ferenc Molnár wrote The Good Fairy, originally A jó tündér, in 1930. The English translation by Jane Hinton was presented on Broadway, with another production later that year. In 1935, Preston Sturges adapted the story for the film The Good Fairy. The film's screenplay was used as the basis for the 1951 Broadway musical Make A Wish. The Good Fairy tells the story of a woman who must face the consequences of pretending to be someone she is not.

== Production history ==
The Good Fairy premiered on Broadway on November 30, 1931, at Henry Miller's Theatre. This original production was both produced and staged by Gilbert Miller. It starred Helen Hayes as Lu, Walter Connolly as Dr. Sporum, Salo Douday as Underwaiter, Ruth Hammond as Karoline, Jack Lynds as Law Clerk, Paul McGrath as The Head Waiter, Evelyn Roberts as Konrad, and Douglas Wood as Dr. Metz. The play closed on April 2, 1932, after 151 performances.

The show was soon revived on Broadway, this time at the Forrest Theatre, on November 17, 1932. The revival was produced by O.E. Wee and Jules J. Leventhal and staged by Lionel Bevans. The cast was almost completely new and included Ada May as Lu, Thomas A. Braidon as Dr. Metz, Salo Douday as Underwaiter, John Eldredge as The Head Waiter, Charles A. Francis as Dr. Sporum, Robert T. Haines as Konrad, Jack Lynds as the Law Clerk, and Hilda Plowright as Karloine. This production was even more unsuccessful than the first closing on January 1, 1933, after only 68 performances. In 1933 it was produced at Harold Lloyd's Beverly Hills Little Theatre for Professionals, directed by Oliver Hinsdale and featuring Marion Clayton, J. Irving White, Harry Stubbs, Kenneth Thomson, Richard Tucker, and Francesca Bragglotti.

== Musical ==
The musical version, titled Make A Wish ran from April 18, 1951, through July 14, 1951, playing a total of 102 Performances at the Winter Garden Theatre. John C. Wilson directed, while Gower Champion served as the choreographer. Hugh Martin provided both the music and the lyrics for Make a Wish. Preston Sturges wrote the book along with Abe Burrows who is uncredited for the project.

== Film ==
A film version of The Good Fairy, with the same title, was produced and distributed by Universal Pictures Corporation in 1935. The film was directed by William Wyler and starred Margaret Sullavan as Luisa, Herbert Marshall as Dr. Sporum, Frank Morgan as Konrad, Eric Blore as Dr. Metz.

== About the Playwright ==
Ferenc Neumann was born on January 12, 1878, in Budapest, Hungary, into a Jewish family. In 1896, he changed his last name to Molnár to be more successful as a writer. Originally, he studied law in his hometown of Budapest and then in Geneva. He eventually left this track to return to his love of journalism. When he was eighteen, he began writing for a Budapest newspaper. His most famous works, both plays and novels, are his earliest works. One of his most successful plays was Liliom in 1909. In 1945, this play would become the well-known Oscar and Hammerstein musical Carousel. Other famous plays include The Devil in 1907, The Guardsman written in 1910 and then translated in 1924, The Wolf in 1913, and The Swan in 1921. The Swan was made into a film in 1956 and starred Grace Kelly. He wrote forty plays total. After he worked as a correspondent during World War I, he spent most of his time living in Europe. Then, in 1936, he immigrated to the United States. Once he became a citizen, Molnár married three times. On April 2, 1952, Ferenc Molnár died in New York City.

== Characters ==
Lu: 25 years old
Dr. Sporum: 48 years old
Konrad: 45 years old
Dr. Metz: 48 years old
Kellner, the head waiter: 32 years old
Karoline: 28 years old
Manager

Mute Characters:
A clerk
A waiter
A decorator
Two work women

== Setting ==
Act I. A private dining room in a hotel. Evening.
Act II. Sporum's Office. The next day.
Act III. Sporum's Office. The next afternoon.
Epilogue. The same private dining room from Act I. Ten years later.

== Synopsis ==
Act I
Konrad impatiently waits for Lu to arrive for their dinner date. Lu has Konrad fooled into thinking that she is married to a successful lawyer and is afraid that they will be caught together. Konrad is crazy for Lu, but she doesn't seem to feel the same way. She insists that he call the minister who was supposed have joined them on their date. When exits, Lu is left alone with the Head Waiter, who she apparently knows from somewhere. She expresses that she is not as well off as she has told Konrad she is and has many old debts from pretending to be wealthy. She calls herself a good fairy because she seems to bring everyone except herself good luck. When Konrad returns, he expresses he would like her husband to be his business attorney. He leaves to take a phone call. Lu takes this opportunity to look in the phonebook for a lawyer who she can pretend is her husband. She tells Konrad her husband's name is Dr. Max Sporum and makes him promise not to mention her when he calls him. The minister, Dr. Metz, finally shows up extremely drunk. He tries to get Lu to open up about her husband. She becomes very flustered and tells Konrad to get the check and a taxi. Dr. Metz leaves to make Lu feel better. As Konrad leaves, he and Lu share their first kiss. When he is finally gone, the Head Waiter suggests there is chemistry between them from the past. He says he wants to marry her. Lu doesn't say no, but instead tells him, "Not now."

Act II
Dr. Max Sporum is eating lunch in his office with his secretary Karoline. They talk about all of the collectors that will be coming today to collect his many debts. Karoline tells Max about Konrad's inquiry for a business attorney. Both of them believe it must be some kind of joke. Lu arrives at the office and tells Max about what she has done, from her old job as an usherette to finding him in the phone book and calling him her husband. Dr. Sporum finds her story completely preposterous. Konrad arrives and, as promised, acts like he does not know Lu. At the end of the act, Max decides to take Konrad's offer.

Act III
With his new income, Dr. Sporum outfits his office with everything he has always wanted. Lu enters and tells him that she did not go to Konrad the previous evening. Instead she went to see another man and Konrad caught her. Moments later, Konrad arrives at the office so Lu runs too hide. Konrad quickly tells Dr. Sporum what he saw last night. He followed the taxi that took Lu to the Head Waiter's house. He then tells Sporum that he must break their contract. When Lu returns, she tells Konrad that she and Sporum are getting a divorce because she is with another man. The Head Waiter enters. He announces that he and Lu are engaged and are opening a restaurant. Lu asks Sporum if he would be their attorney. He agrees, but seems less than thrilled about the idea. She slowly exits watching Sporum half-heartedly sharpen his pencils.

Epilogue
The manager enters and reads a letter from Ferenc Molnár about how too many playwrights today are leaving their audiences hanging. The curtain rises on a scene that takes place ten years later. Lu and Karoline are setting up for Lu's wedding anniversary. The Head Waiter is the first to arrive. He talks about how his restaurant was a failure and that he and Lu never married. Sporum enters. He is now a university professor and has married Karoline. Konrad is the next to enter, but he is not married to Lu either. Finally, Dr. Metz, enters. He is the one who Lu has married and now works for Konrad. The play ends as they all sit down to dinner.
