= Pretty Things (2005 film) =

- Directed by: Liz Goldwyn
- Produced by: Liz Goldwyn
- Starring: Liz Goldwyn; Zorita; Betty Rowland; Sherry Britton
- Distributed by: HBO
- Release date: 2005

Pretty Things is a 2005 documentary directed by and starring Liz Goldwyn.

== Overview ==
A look into the world of 20th century burlesque queens. The film premiered on HBO and the Canadian Broadcasting Corporation in 2006. Following the documentary, Liz Goldwyn's first book, Pretty Things: The Last Generation of American Burlesque Queens, was published by HarperCollins.
