= Homer G. Tasker =

American sound engineer (1899–1990)

- Born: February 19, 1899; Grant County, South Dakota, United States
- Died: January 9, 1990 (aged 90); Los Angeles, California, United States
- Occupation: Sound engineer
- Years active: 1936-1937

Homer G. Tasker (February 19, 1899 – January 9, 1990) was an American sound engineer. He was nominated for two Academy Awards in the category Sound Recording.

== Selected filmography ==
- Three Smart Girls (1936)
- One Hundred Men and a Girl (1937)
