= Every Sunday =

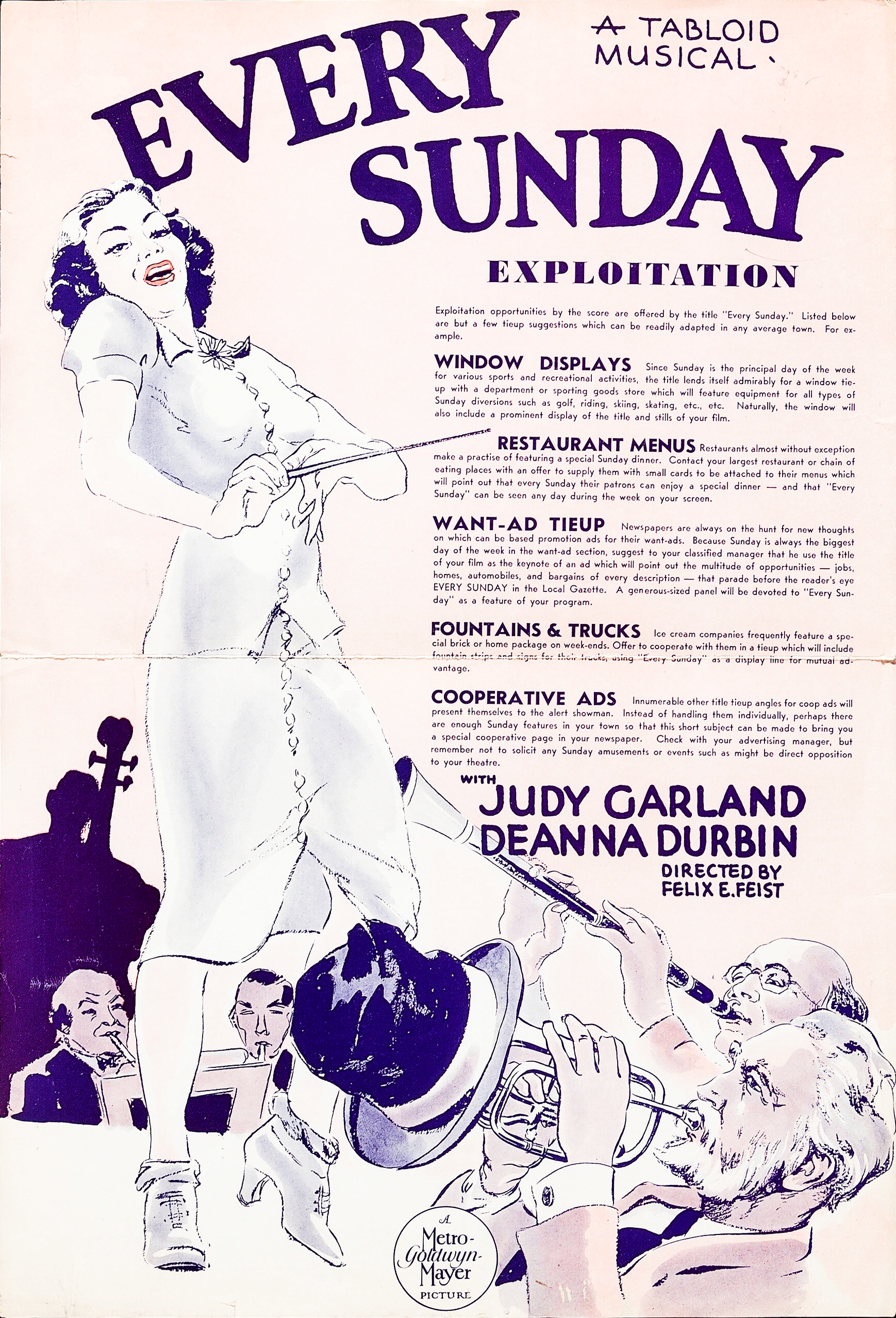
- Pressbook
- Directed by: Felix E. Feist
- Written by: Mauri Grashin
- Starring: Judy Garland; Deanna Durbin
- Cinematography: Charles G. Clarke; (uncredited)
- Music by: Con Conrad; Herb Magidson
- Production company: Metro-Goldwyn-Mayer
- Distributed by: Metro-Goldwyn-Mayer
- Release date: November 28, 1936
- Running time: 11 minutes
- Country: United States
- Language: English

Every Sunday (sometimes incorrectly listed as Every Sunday Afternoon or Opera vs. Jazz) is a 1936 American musical short film about two adolescent girls and their efforts to save a public concert series threatened by poor attendance.

Directed by Felix E. Feist, the film served as a screen test for, and is the first significant screen appearance of, two adolescent actresses who soon became stars, Judy Garland and Deanna Durbin. Although only lightly reviewed at the time of its release, the film has garnered a generally positive reputation among Garland biographers.

== Plot ==
Small town friends Edna (Deanna Durbin) and Judy (Judy Garland) are upset. Edna's grandfather and his orchestra, who play free Sunday concerts at a local park, have been fired by the town council because the concerts are poorly attended. The girls hit upon the idea of singing at the concerts and set about promoting the next concert. The following Sunday Edna and Judy join Granddad on the bandstand. Edna's operatic style and Judy's swing bring crowds running from all over the park. The event is a huge success and Granddad's concerts are saved.

== Production ==
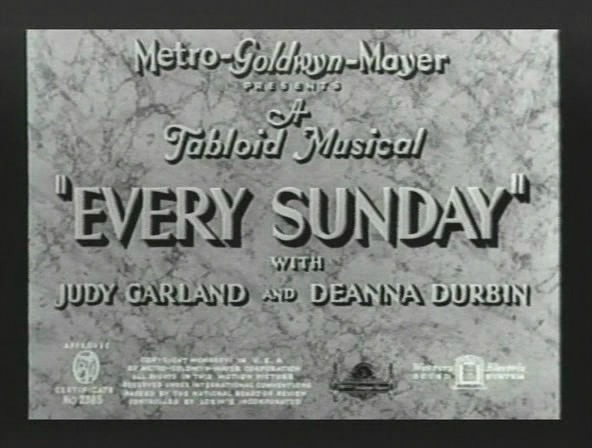
Title card used in the film

Deanna Durbin and Judy Garland were both under contract to Metro-Goldwyn-Mayer but the studio had not put them to work in films. With their contracts coming up for renewal, feelings among studio executives were that the studio didn't need two girl singers. Every Sunday would serve as an extended screen test to decide which girl's contract would be renewed.

Durbin recorded the aria Il Bacio for the film. Composers Con Conrad and Herb Magidson wrote a specialty number for Garland, "The Americana."

Following the screening of the short for MGM executives, opinion was divided on whether Garland or Durbin should be retained. Finally, Louis B. Mayer, upon his return from a European trip, decreed that both girls should be kept. However, Durbin's contract option had expired by then. She was signed by Universal Studios, where her first picture, Three Smart Girls (1936), was so successful that it saved Universal from bankruptcy.

== Critical reception ==
As a short film that served as a programmer, Every Sunday received scant critical attention upon its release. Durbin's hometown newspaper, the Winnipeg Free Press, did praise the film, lamenting that it was "all too short" and citing Garland as a "girl singer of distinction."

Garland biographers, when discussing the film in any detail, are generally complimentary both to the film and to Garland. "Unpretentious and fascinating...Every Sunday gives us a marvelous glimpse of Judy's talent in an unrefined state" is a typical comment, with the film "reveal[ing] how accomplished a performer Judy Garland already was at fourteen." Durbin does not fare quite as well. Although described by one biographer as appearing "relaxed" and "happy" on film others dismiss her "diffidence" and call her "stiff."
