= Make a Wish (musical) =

1951 Broadway stage musical

- LP cover
- Music: Hugh Martin
- Lyrics: Hugh Martin
- Book: Preston Sturges; Abe Burrows (uncredited)
- Basis: Ferenc Molnár; The Good Fairy (play); Preston Sturges; The Good Fairy (screenplay)
- Productions: 1951 Broadway

Make a Wish is a musical with a book by Preston Sturges and Abe Burrows, who was not credited, and music and lyrics by Hugh Martin.

Based on Sturges' screenplay for the 1935 film The Good Fairy, which in turn is based on the 1930 play of the same name by Ferenc Molnár as translated by Jane Hinton, the musical focuses on Janette, who experiences various adventures, including love with young artist Paul Dumont, when she abandons her tour group during a visit to Paris.

Sturges' primary motivation for writing the book was financial, as he was deeply in debt at the time.

The musical opened on Broadway on April 18, 1951 at the Winter Garden Theatre where it ran for a total of 102 performances until it closed on July 14, 1951. The production was produced by Harry Rigby, Jule Styne and Alexander H. Cohen; staged by John C. Wilson; and choreographed by Gower Champion. Raoul Pène Du Bois designed the sets, lights, and costumes for the production. The original cast included Nanette Fabray as Janette, Harold Lang as Ricky, Melville Cooper as Marius Frigo, Stephen Douglass as Paul Dumont, Helen Gallagher as Poupette, Phil Leeds as Dr. Francel, Eda Heinemann as Dr. Didier, and Howard Wendell as the policeman.

== Song list ==
Act I

- The Tour Must Go On
- I Wanna Be Good'n Bad
- The Time Step
- (You're Just) What I Was Warned About
- Who Gives a Sou?
- Folies Labiche Overture (Hello, Hello, Hello)
- Tonight You Are in Paree
- When Does This Feeling Go Away
- Suits Me Fine
- Students Ball
- Paris, France

Act II

- That Face!
- Make a Wish
- I'll Never Make a Frenchman Out of You
- Over and Over
- The Sale (Ballet)
- Over and Over (Reprise)
- Who Gives a Sou? (Reprise)
- Take Me Back to Texas With You
- Suits Me Fine (Reprise)
- Finale
