= John C. Wilson =

American theatre director (1899–1961)

John Chapman Wilson (August 19, 1899 – October 29, 1961) was an American theatre director and producer.

== Early life ==
Born in Trenton, New Jersey Wilson started out his working life as a stockbroker. He married Russian Princess Natalia Pavlovna Paley on September 8, 1937 in Fairfield, Connecticut. It was a marriage of convenience. Wilson was intelligent, rich and a good companion. Natalia's name and social skills were assets to his business as a Broadway producer. Princess Paley liked her husband's humor, and his homosexuality suited her distaste for physical love. They had no children.

== Career ==
During the run of The Vortex by Noël Coward in 1924, Wilson met Coward and soon became his business manager and lover. Wilson used his position to steal from Coward, but the playwright was in love and accepted both the larceny and Wilson's heavy drinking.

Wilson began his theatre career in 1931 as General Manager for the original Broadway production of Coward's hit play Private Lives. He began producing shows on Broadway in 1935, including Coward's Tonight at 8.30 in 1936 and Set to Music in 1939. Wilson's first project as a director was another Coward work, Blithe Spirit, in 1941.

== Additional credits ==
- 1952: The Deep Blue Sea (Producer)
- 1951: Make a Wish (Director)
- 1950: The Lady's Not for Burning (Producer)
- 1949: Gentlemen Prefer Blondes (Director)
- 1948: Kiss Me, Kate (Director)
- 1947: The Winslow Boy (Producer)
- 1946: Present Laughter (Producer and Director)
- 1945: The Day Before Spring (Producer and Director)
- 1944: Bloomer Girl (Producer)
- 1942: The Pirate by S. N. Behrman (Director)
