= It Started with Eve =

1941 film by Norman Krasna, Henry Koster, Joe Pasternak

- Theatrical release poster
- Directed by: Henry Koster
- Screenplay by: Norman Krasna; Leo Townsend
- Story by: Hanns Kräly
- Produced by: Joe Pasternak
- Starring: Deanna Durbin; Robert Cummings; Charles Laughton
- Cinematography: Rudolph Maté
- Edited by: Bernard W. Burton
- Music by: Hans J. Salter
- Production company: Universal Pictures
- Distributed by: Universal Pictures
- Release date: September 26, 1941 (USA)
- Running time: 90 minutes
- Country: United States
- Language: English
- Budget: $1,166,000 or $1,250,000
- Box office: $2,264,300

It Started with Eve is a 1941 American musical romantic comedy film starring Deanna Durbin, Charles Laughton, and Robert Cummings. Directed by Henry Koster, the film received an Oscar nomination for Best Original Music Score (Charles Previn and Hans J. Salter). The film is considered by some critics to be Durbin's best film, and the last in which she worked with the producer (Joe Pasternak) and director (Henry Koster) who groomed her for stardom. It Started with Eve was remade in 1964 as I'd Rather Be Rich.

== Plot ==
The renowned New York City millionaire Jonathan Reynolds is dying, and his son Johnny returns from Mexico City to his deathbed. The attending physician, Dr. Harvey, informs Johnny that his father does not have much time to live and that his last wish is to get to meet Johnny's future wife. Johnny drives quickly to his hotel to find his fiancée, Gloria Pennington, but she is out with her mother. Desperate, he asks the first plausible woman he sees, hat check girl Anne Terry, if she can play Gloria for a brief introduction to his failing father. She agrees. She is kind to the beleaguered man, and he is pleased with her manner.

To everyone's surprise, Jonathan senior feels much better than expected the next morning and asks if he can see Gloria again. Dr. Harvey is still concerned about the health of his patient and asks Johnny to keep pretending that Anne is Gloria. Johnny catches Anne at the train station as she is about to leave for her hometown for good and convinces her to return with him.

He and Anne arrive at the Reynolds home, and Gloria is warmly welcomed by his father. Johnny panics, and runs off to the real Gloria, while Anne, an aspiring opera singer, learns of Jonathan's New York music world contacts. She offers to sing for him, brushes off his evasions, then dazzles him with her talent.

Johnny explains his dilemma to the Penningtons, which does not go well with the grasping mother.

So impressed is Jonathan with Anne's performance, he organizes a party to introduce her to his famous friends. Unwilling to see Anne masquerade as his fiancée to all of New York society, Johnny shows up at her apartment with a check paying her for her services, and insists she leaves town.

Over dinner at their home, Johnny tells his father that he and "Gloria" quarreled, she broke the engagement, and has abruptly left. Jonathan cannot believe she would have done so without at least saying goodbye to him.

Unexpectedly, Anne arrives, apologizes for her foolishness and begs forgiveness. At first opportunity out of his father's earshot, Johnny berates her for her reversal. Overhearing their dispute, Jonathan learns of Johnny's scheming and Anne's well-meaning imposture. This only piques his desire to help her, in return for her having helped him.

The Penningtons make a surprise appearance, startling the threesome. They receive a frosty welcome from Jonathan, and depart hastily. Jonathan resolves to play Cupid between Ann and Johnny.

At the party Jonathan is in fine spirits, but Johnny tells him that Gloria has a headache and cannot attend. Jonathan is completely crestfallen, and insists on immediately calling her to convince her to come. She brusquely refuses, and tells him she never wants to see him again. The Penningtons arrive at the party, but there is no trace of Jonathan.

Undaunted by Anne's rebuff, Jonathan has set off to see her. Using the family chauffeur to find her small apartment, he tells her that he knows the truth, and only wants to go out for a quiet farewell dinner between old friends. Promising to take her to an out-of-the-way place, he brings her to a top nightclub where they drink and dance merrily. Anne is introduced by default to a large swath of New York's elite, as well as some savvy media.

Jonathan secretly sends word to Johnny to come to the club. When Johnny and Dr. Harvey arrive, Johnny accuses Anne of endangering his father's life. Anne flings Jonathan's drink in his face and leaves.

The next day, Johnny catches Anne once again at the station, telling her that his father has had a setback, is in grave condition again, and wants to see her. They rush to the mansion, only to find that Jonathan is fine—it was Dr. Harvey who had collapsed. Jonathan just took advantage of the mixup to bring the young couple back together. Johnny and Anne finally recognize their true feelings for each other. Jonathan is delighted.

== Cast ==
- Deanna Durbin as Anne Terry
- Charles Laughton as Jonathan Reynolds
- Robert Cummings as Jonathan 'Johnny' Reynolds Jr.
- Guy Kibbee as Bishop Maxwell
- Margaret Tallichet as Gloria Pennington
- Catherine Doucet as Mrs. Pennington
- Walter Catlett as Doctor Harvey
- Charles Coleman as Roberts
- Leonard Elliott as Reverend Henry Stebbins
- Irving Bacon as Raven
- Gus Schilling as Raven
- Wade Boteler as Harry, the Newspaper Editor
- Dorothea Kent as Jackie Donovan
- Clara Blandick as Nurse

== Production ==
=== Development ===
The film was originally known as Almost an Angel. Joe Pasternak announced he would make the picture in 1938 as a vehicle for Danielle Darrieux. Ralph Bock and Frederick Kohner wrote a script. Then in 1939 Franciska Gaal was announced as star.

The film was eventually never made – the title was transferred to another project by Pasternak in December 1940 which would become It Started with Eve. Henry Koster was chosen as director and L Fodor and Norman Krasna wrote the script.

In February 1941 Charles Laughton signed on. The following month Deanna Durbin agreed to co-star; plans to put her in Ready to Romance with Charles Boyer were abandoned.

=== Shooting ===
Filming started 27 May 1941, just after Durbin returned from honeymoon for her first marriage.

Pasternak announced during filming that he would be leaving Universal after 16 years. He later wrote about it in his memoirs:

I called her into my office and told her why it had to be and why I was leaving. It was the only time in our years together I saw her weep. "You can't", she said. "You can't do this to me." But I had my personal reasons, and they did not all concern her and I said I must. It was not easy to talk to her because a lot of water had flowed under the bridge. She had her life to live now and it could not be the same as before. She said some nice things and ran out of the office.

In October 1941 Koster said this was the toughest film he had ever worked on. He had an argument with Norman Krasna which resulted in Krasna quitting the film with 40 pages still to be written. Richard Carle died after working in the picture for three weeks. He was in every scene and they all had to be shot again with Walter Catlett in the role. Then Durbin became ill for four weeks; they shot around her for five days then had to stop production. When she came back Laughton fell ill and there was another delay. An electrician fell from a scaffolding on the set and broke a leg and another was burned. Pasternak signed to go to MGM and Koster was getting divorced.

Koster later said he thought Durbin looked at her most beautiful in this film because of Rudolph Mate's photography. He also recalled:

I had to stay home after eight o'clock at night because of the curfew. I was not only a foreigner, I was an enemy alien — a German. Every night at eight o'clock Charles Laughton came to see my wife and me, and he sat with us all evening and read to us. It was part of what he was rehearsing for his one-man show. He read things that were unknown to me, which I found delightful. But he also read Shakespeare and the Bible. Peggy [Moran] and I got engaged at Laughton's house.

Filming did not finish until September. Cummings had to go work on Kings Row during the shoot.

== Reception ==
=== Box office ===
The film was a hit and earned $2,264,300.

=== Critical ===
In his review in The New York Times, Bosley Crowther called the film "light and unpretentious fare" and "should please—as they say—both young and old. It's the perfect '8-to-80' picture." Crowther singled out the performances of Charles Laughton, who plays cupid, and Deanna Durbin. Crowther wrote:

Henry Koster, who directed the picture and has directed most of Miss Durbin's better films, certainly knew how to get the best out of Mr. Laughton, that man of great renown. For this is one of the sharpest performances the old boy has given in years ... Mr. Laughton plays with flavor, mischief, humor and great inventiveness. He knows how an old man would behave—and he never carries it too far. Under a perfect make-up, you'd hardly know it was Mr. Laughton—which is saying a lot.

Regarding Durbin's performance, Crowther wrote, "Miss Durbin is as refreshing and pretty as she has ever been and sings three assorted songs—including a Tchaikovsky waltz—with lively charm."

Durbin later said the film "was handed to Charles Laughton. He was marvellous in the picture and the fact that we remained very close friends even though we were both aware of Eve being a Laughton not a Durbin film, shows how fond we were of each other."

Variety called it "wholesome entertainment... one of those typical Cinderella tales which have so successfully served Miss Durbin in most of her previous pictures. Developed at a consistently fast pace, with plenty of spontaneous comedy exploding en route, 'Eve' takes full advantage of Laughton's abilities to handle a light comedy assignment."

"You need the stomach of a saint to sit through it," sniped Pauline Kael.

Laughton's biographer Simon Callow wrote that the film was "not a very agreeable experience, watching it today, but Deanna Durbin, whose vehicle it was, is pleasantly straightforward on the plump brink of womanhood, and Charles is larky. He seems to be having fun; indeed, there is every evidence that he was having fun."

Filmink wrote in 2024 "Cummings and Durbin don’t have enough screen time together, but the movie is magical – all three leads are perfect (to really see how good it is, compare it with the 1964 remake, I’d Rather Be Rich)."

== Award nomination ==
Charles Previn and Hans J. Salter were nominated for the 1942 Academy Award for Best Original Music Score.
