= Deanna Durbin =

Canadian-American singer, actress (1921–2013)

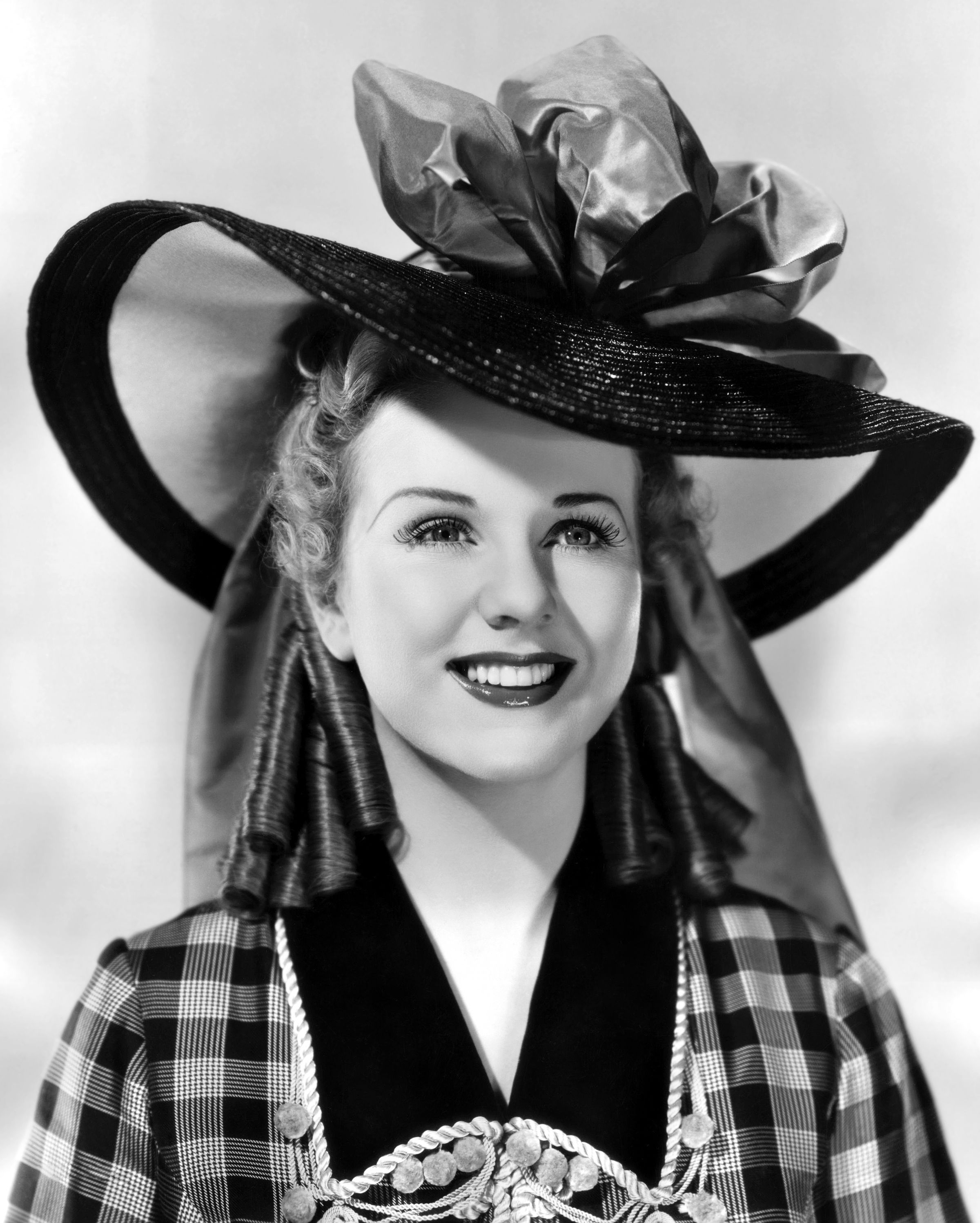
- Durbin in 1944 (publicity photo for Can't Help Singing)
- Born: Edna Mae Durbin; December 4, 1921; Winnipeg, Manitoba, Canada
- Died: April 17, 2013 (aged 91); Paris, France
- Occupations: Actress; singer
- Years active: 1935–1949
- Spouses: Vaughn Paul (m. 1941; div. 1943) Felix Jackson (m. 1945; div. 1949) Charles Henri David (m. 1950; died 1999)
- Children: 2

Edna Mae Durbin (December 4, 1921 – April 17, 2013), known professionally as Deanna Durbin, was a Canadian-American lyric soprano and actress, who moved to the United States with her family in infancy. She appeared in musical films in the 1930s and 1940s. Additionally, she performed mostly classical concerts and recitals as well as concerts with semi-classical and popular music. She specialized in opera arias, art song, and semi-classical songs, which is today known as classical crossover.

Durbin was a child actress who made her first film appearance with Judy Garland in Every Sunday (1936), and subsequently signed a contract with Universal Pictures. She achieved success as the ideal teenaged daughter in films such as Three Smart Girls (1936) and One Hundred Men and a Girl (1937). Her work was credited with saving the studio from bankruptcy, and led to Durbin being awarded the Academy Juvenile Award in 1938.

As she matured, Durbin grew dissatisfied with the girl-next-door roles assigned to her and attempted to move into sophisticated non-musical roles with film noir Christmas Holiday (1944) and the whodunit Lady on a Train (1945). These films, produced by frequent collaborator and second husband Felix Jackson, were not as successful; and she continued in musical roles. Upon her retirement and divorce from Jackson in 1949, Durbin married producer-director Charles Henri David and moved to a farmhouse near Paris. She withdrew from public life, granting only one interview on her career in 1983.

== Early life ==
The younger child of James Allen Durbin and Ada Tomlinson Read, natives of Greater Manchester, England who relocated to Winnipeg, Canada, Deanna had an elder sister, Edith. When she was an infant, Durbin's family moved to Los Angeles due to her father's health problems with the cold winters in Winnipeg, and she and her family became United States citizens in 1928. By the time she was 10, her sister recognized that she had definite talent and enrolled her in voice lessons at the Ralph Thomas Academy. Durbin soon became Thomas's prize pupil, and he showcased her talent at various local clubs and churches.

== Career and life ==
=== 1935–1941: Early career ===
In early 1935, Metro-Goldwyn-Mayer was planning a biographical film on the life of opera star Ernestine Schumann-Heink and was having difficulty finding an actress to play the young opera singer. MGM casting director Rufus LeMaire heard about a talented young soloist performing with the Ralph Thomas Academy and called her in for an audition. Durbin sang "Il Bacio" for the studio's vocal coach, who was stunned by her "mature soprano" voice. She sang the number again for Louis B. Mayer, who signed her to a six-month contract. She made her first film appearance in the short Every Sunday (1936) with Judy Garland, another teenage singer-actress whose career would rival Durbin's. The film was intended as a demonstration of their talent as performers as studio executives had questioned the wisdom of casting two female singers together. Louis B. Mayer decided to sign both, but by then, Durbin's contract option had lapsed.

Universal Pictures producer Joe Pasternak wished to borrow Garland from MGM, but she was unavailable. When Pasternak learned that Durbin was no longer with MGM, he instead cast her in the film. At 14 years old, Durbin signed with Universal, giving her the professional name Deanna. Her first feature-length film, Three Smart Girls (1936), was a success and established Durbin as a young star. With Pasternak producing for Universal, Durbin starred in a succession of successful musical films, including One Hundred Men and a Girl (1937), Mad About Music (1938), That Certain Age (1938), Three Smart Girls Grow Up (1939), and First Love (1939)—most of which were directed by Henry Koster.

Durbin also continued to pursue singing projects. In 1936, she auditioned to provide the vocals for Snow White in Disney's animated film Snow White and the Seven Dwarfs, but was rejected by Walt Disney, who said the 15-year-old Durbin's voice was "too old" for the part. Andrés de Segurola, who was the vocal coach working with Universal Studios that became her voice teacher—himself a former Metropolitan Opera singer—believed that Durbin was a potential opera star. De Segurola was commissioned to advise the Metropolitan Opera on her progress. Also in 1936, Durbin began a radio collaboration with Eddie Cantor which lasted until 1938, when her heavy workload for Universal forced her to quit her weekly appearances. During the 1940s, she put on several classical concerts and gave some recitals. She also performed concerts with semi-classical and popular music for the troops who were fighting in World War II.

The success of Durbin's films was reported to have saved Universal from bankruptcy. In 1938, she received an Academy Juvenile Award with Mickey Rooney. Producer Joe Pasternak said:

Deanna's genius had to be unfolded, but it was hers and hers alone, always has been, always will be, and no one can take credit for discovering her. You can't hide that kind of light under a bushel. You just can't, no matter how hard you try!

Durbin continued her success with It's a Date (1940), Spring Parade (1940), and Nice Girl? (1941).

=== 1941–1945: Attempts to expand ===
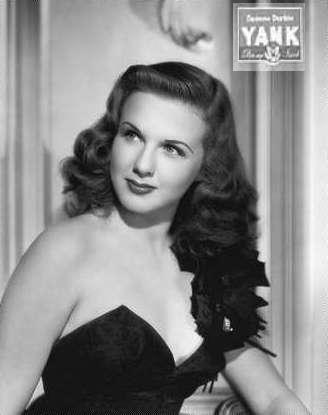
Durbin on the cover of Yank (1945)

In 1941, Durbin starred in It Started with Eve (1941), her last film with Pasternak and director Henry Koster. Pasternak moved from Universal to MGM. Koster wanted to reunite Durbin with Charles Laughton as Christine and Erik in a new version of The Phantom of the Opera with Erik as Christines's father, but Durbin found the script too bloody and rejected it. This father-daughter element made it into Phantom of the Opera (1943), but it was cut at a late stage. Universal announced Durbin was to star in They Lived Alone, scheduled to be directed by Koster. However, Durbin was unhappy with the role, and that Universal had not given support to the career of her first husband, assistant director Vaughn Paul, whom she had married in April 1941. Durbin turned down the role, and was suspended by the studio from October 16, 1941, to early February 1942. In late January 1942, Durbin and Universal settled their differences, with the studio conceding to Durbin the approval of her directors, stories, and songs.

In April 1942 Universal announced a second sequel to Three Smart Girls: the wartime-themed Three Smart Girls Join Up, in which Durbin would "wear overalls and be either a riveter or a welder". Durbin issued a statement to the trade papers that she would no longer be appearing in any Three Smart Girls pictures and was abandoning the "Penny Craig" character in favor of solo vehicles. The title was changed to Hers to Hold (1943), revolving solely around her character. The film almost went unproduced; French director Jean Renoir was hired to direct Three Smart Girls Join Up, but a subsequent report announced that the Three Smart Girls picture was being replaced by The Divine Young Lady (the former They Lived Alone), a story of refugee children from China. The project was initially conceived without musical numbers, but Durbin finally relented to Universal's demand to include some. The finished film was released as The Amazing Mrs. Holliday (1943), with the new title suggestive of MGM's wartime hit Mrs. Miniver.

Co-star Joseph Cotten would later speak highly of Durbin's integrity and character. Durbin had an iron will, and was influential in executive decisions at Universal, being one of the company's major stockholders. Columnist Jack Lait reported that "Durbin has been hard to deal with since she married. Demands her husband (who was only an assistant) direct her, and what with the $25,000 [salary] ceiling, she'll do it her way or no way." She dabbled in other genres, such as the romantic comedy His Butler's Sister (1943) and the musical Western Can't Help Singing (1944), her only Technicolor film, which was produced on location in southern Utah and co-starred Robert Paige. The film featured some of the last melodies written by Jerome Kern.

Durbin continued her push to establish herself as a more dramatic actress with the film noir Christmas Holiday (1944), directed by Robert Siodmak and co-starring Gene Kelly. Siodmak praised Durbin's acting skills, but later recalled she was difficult as "she wanted to play a new part but flinched from looking like a tramp: she always wanted to look like nice, wholesome Deanna Durbin pretending to be a tramp." Although the film received mixed reviews, Durbin later called it her "only really good film". The whodunit Lady on a Train (1945) also received mixed reviews.

Deanna Durbin's future husband Charles David and writer Hugh Gray prepared a dramatic thriller for Durbin, The Fairy Tale Murder, about a phobic young woman who is terrorized by mysterious criminals. Durbin rejected it, so it was reworked by Leslie Charteris, author of the Saint novels who had co-written Durbin's Lady on a Train, and reassigned to Universal's teenaged singing star Gloria Jean. Charles David remained as director. Fairy Tale Murder was filmed in September and October 1944 but it was held back until September 1945, after Gloria Jean had left the studio's employ, and released as River Gang (international releases retained the original Fairy Tale Murder title).

=== 1946–1949: Last motion pictures ===
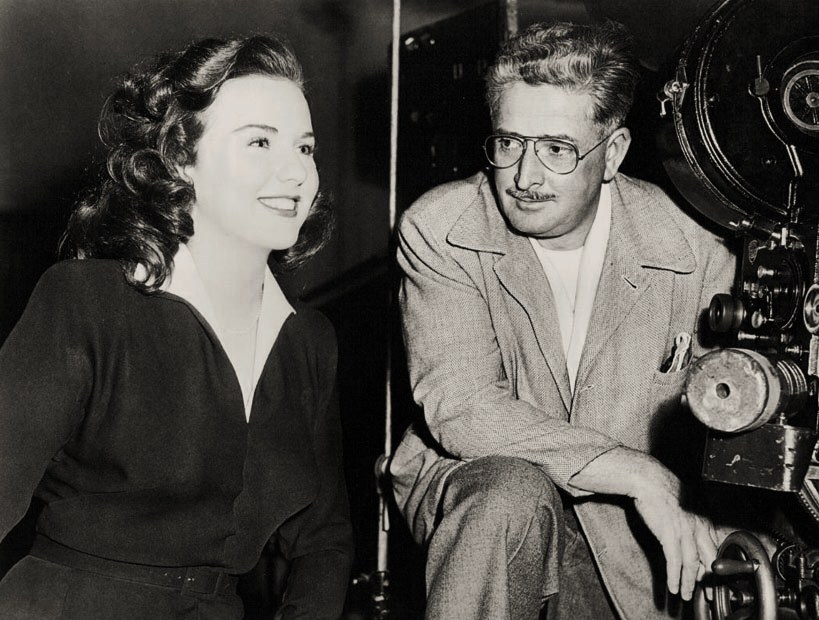
Durbin and cinematographer William H. Daniels on set of For the Love of Mary (1948)

Most of Deanna Durbin's pictures had been produced by Felix Jackson, whom she married in August 1945; they welcomed their daughter, Jessica Louise, in February 1946. She was then the second-highest-paid woman in the United States, just behind Bette Davis; her fan club ranked as the world's largest during her active years. However, while her adult dramatic roles may have been more satisfying for Durbin, it was clear her fans preferred her in light musical confections.

In 1946, Universal merged with two other companies to create Universal-International. The new regime discontinued much of Universal's familiar product and scheduled only a few musicals. Jackson left Universal in November 1946; he also left Durbin in January 1947, although their separation was not announced until the following year.

Durbin's final four pictures — I'll Be Yours (1947), Something in the Wind (1947), Up in Central Park (1948), and For the Love of Mary (1948) — all reverted to her previous musical-comedy structure. On August 22, 1948, Universal-International announced a lawsuit which sought to collect wages the studio had paid Durbin in advance. Durbin settled the complaint by agreeing to star in three more pictures, including one in Paris; this did not materialize before Durbin's contract expired. She received a $200,000 ($2,700,000 in 2025) severance payment.

=== 1949–2013: Retirement ===
Unsatisfied by her career options, Durbin chose to retire and move to Paris. When her former producer Joe Pasternak tried to dissuade her, she told him, "I can't run around being a Little Miss Fix-It who bursts into song—the highest-paid star with the poorest material." In September 1949, Durbin filed for divorce from Jackson, which was finalized in November.

On December 21, 1950, Durbin married French director-producer Charles David, who had previously directed her in Lady on a Train. Durbin and David raised a son, Peter David (born in June 1951), as well as Durbin's daughter Jessica, on a farm outside of Paris. Durbin turned down several offers for a comeback, including a Broadway role as Eliza Doolittle in My Fair Lady; she later said, "I had my ticket for Paris in my pocket." In 1951, she was invited to play in London's West End production of Kiss Me, Kate, and in the Metro-Goldwyn-Mayer film version of the same in 1953, and Sigmund Romberg's operetta The Student Prince in 1954.

In 1983, film historian David Shipman was granted a rare interview by Durbin. Durbin acknowledged her dislike of the Hollywood studio system, emphasizing that she never identified herself with the public image that the media created around her. She spoke of the Deanna "persona" in the third person, and considered the film character "Deanna Durbin" to be a byproduct of her youth and not her true identity. In private life, Durbin had continued to use her given name, Edna; salary figures printed annually by the Hollywood trade publications listed the actress as "Edna Mae Durbin, player". Also in the interview, she steadfastly asserted her right to privacy, something she maintained until the end of her life, declining to be profiled on websites.

Durbin's husband of almost 50 years, Charles David, died in Paris on March 1, 1999. On April 30, 2013, a newsletter published by the Deanna Durbin Society reported that Durbin had died "in the past few days", quoting her son, Peter H. David, who thanked her admirers for respecting her privacy. No other details were given. According to the Social Security Death Index (under the name Edna M. David), she died on April 17, 2013 in the 19th arrondissement of Paris.

== Legacy ==
Deanna Durbin has a star on the Hollywood Walk of Fame at 1722 Vine Street. She left her handprints and footprints in front of the Grauman's Chinese Theatre on February 7, 1938. Durbin was well known in Winnipeg, Manitoba (her place of birth), as "Winnipeg's Golden Girl" (a reference to one of the city's most famous landmarks, the statue Golden Boy atop the Manitoba Legislative Building).

Frank Tashlin's Warner Bros. cartoon The Woods Are Full of Cuckoos (1937) contains a turtle caricature of Deanna Durbin called "Deanna Terrapin". An unnamed caricature of Durbin also appeared in the Warner Brother's cartoon "Malibu Beach Party" (1940).

Jean Hatton appeared in two Australian films being called "an Australian Deanna Durbin".

She is also mentioned by the character Hatsumi in Haruki Murakami's novel Norwegian Wood (in chapter 8), when she says that her grandfather used to brag that he had met Durbin one time in New York. Durbin's singing is featured in Alistair MacLean's 1955 novel HMS Ulysses, which talks about her songs being broadcast over the wartime ship's internal communication system. Durbin figures prominently in the 1963 Ray Bradbury short story "The Anthem Sprinters" (collected in The Machineries of Joy). She is referenced in Richard Brautigan's 1967 novel Trout Fishing in America, when the narrator claims to have seen one of her movies seven times, but cannot recall which one. She is mentioned by the character Hatsumi in Haruki Murakami's novel Norwegian Wood (in chapter 8), when Hatsumi says that her grandfather used to brag that he had met Durbin one time in New York.

In song, she is referenced in the Glenn Miller World War II novelty song "Peggy the Pin-up Girl", where Miller's lyrics pair her name with her first co-star Judy Garland: "Even a voice that's so disturbin' / Like Judy Garland or Miss Durbin / Can't compare to my pin-up queen". Durbin's name was included in the introduction to a song written by satirical writer Tom Lehrer in 1965. Prior to singing "Whatever Became of Hubert?", Lehrer said that Vice President Hubert Humphrey had been relegated to "those where-are-they-now columns: Whatever became of Deanna Durbin, and Hubert Humphrey, and so on." In Philippe Mora's film The Return of Captain Invincible (1983), Christopher Lee sings a song called "Name Your Poison", written by Richard O'Brien and Richard Hartley, which has the line, "Think of young Deanna Durbin / And how she sang on rum and bourbon."

Anne Frank was a fan of Durbin, and pasted two photos of her on the wall in the family's hideout; the photos are still on the wall today. One of the photos is from First Love. Winston Churchill was also a fan of Durbin, screening her films "on celebratory wartime occasions". Russian cellist/conductor Mstislav Rostropovich cites Durbin in the mid-1980s as one of his most important musical influences, stating: "She helped me in my discovery of myself. You have no idea of the smelly old movie houses I patronized to see Deanna Durbin. I tried to create the very best in my music, to try to recreate, to approach her purity." Indian-Bengali film director Satyajit Ray, in his 1992 acceptance speech for an Academy Honorary Award, mentioned Deanna Durbin as the only one of the three cinema personalities (with Ginger Rogers and Billy Wilder) he recalled writing to when young who had acknowledged his fan letter with a reply.

== Filmography ==
Short subjects
Year	Title	Role	Notes
1936	Every Sunday	Edna	Co-starring Judy Garland
1939	For Auld Lang Syne: No. 4	Herself	
1941	A Friend Indeed	Herself	For the American Red Cross
1943	Show Business at War	Herself	
1944	Road to Victory	Herself	A promotional film to support war bonds; also known as The Shining Future

Feature films
Year	Title	Role	Producer	Director	Notes
1936	Three Smart Girls	Penelope "Penny" Craig	Joe Pasternak	Henry Koster	
1937	One Hundred Men and a Girl	Patricia "Patsy" Cardwell	Joe Pasternak	Henry Koster	
1938	Mad About Music	Gloria Harkinson	Joe Pasternak	Norman Taurog	
1938	That Certain Age	Alice Fullerton	Joe Pasternak	Edward Ludwig	
1939	Three Smart Girls Grow Up	Penelope "Penny" Craig	Joe Pasternak	Henry Koster	
1939	First Love	Constance "Connie" Harding	Joe Pasternak	Henry Koster	
1940	It's a Date	Pamela Drake	Joe Pasternak	William A. Seiter	A short subject, Gems of Song, was excerpted from this feature in 1949.
1940	Spring Parade	Ilonka Tolnay	Joe Pasternak	Henry Koster	
1941	Nice Girl?	Jane "Pinky" Dana	Joe Pasternak	William A. Seiter	
1941	It Started with Eve	Anne Terry	Joe Pasternak	Henry Koster	
1943	The Amazing Mrs. Holliday	Ruth Kirke Holliday	Bruce Manning	Bruce Manning	Manning replaced Jean Renoir
1943	Hers to Hold	Penelope "Penny" Craig	Felix Jackson	Frank Ryan	
1943	His Butler's Sister	Ann Carter	Felix Jackson	Frank Borzage	
1944	Christmas Holiday	Jackie Lamont / Abigail Martin	Felix Jackson	Robert Siodmak	
1944	Can't Help Singing	Caroline Frost	Felix Jackson	Frank Ryan	Durbin's only film in Technicolor
1945	Lady on a Train	Nikki Collins / Margo Martin	Felix Jackson	Charles David	
1946	Because of Him	Kim Walker	Felix Jackson	Richard Wallace	
1947	I'll Be Yours	Louise Ginglebusher	Felix Jackson	William A. Seiter	
1947	Something in the Wind	Mary Collins	Joseph Sistrom	Irving Pichel	
1948	Up in Central Park	Rosie Moore	Karl Tunberg	William A. Seiter	
1948	For the Love of Mary	Mary Peppertree	Robert Arthur	Frederick de Cordova	Final film role

=== Box office ranking ===
Box office ranking
Year	United States	UK
1938	15th	6th
1939	12th	1st
1940	12th	2nd
1941	24th	2nd
1942		4th
1944	25th	4th

== Discography ==
Between December 15, 1936, and July 22, 1947, Deanna Durbin recorded 50 tunes for Decca Records. While often re-creating her movie songs for commercial release, Durbin also covered independent standards, like "Kiss Me Again", "My Hero", "Annie Laurie", "Poor Butterfly", "Love's Old Sweet Song" and "God Bless America".

- "Alice Blue Gown"
- "Alleluia" (from 100 Men and a Girl)
- "Always" (from Christmas Holiday)
- "Adeste Fideles"
- "Amapola" (from First Love)
- "Annie Laurie"
- "Any Moment Now" (from Can't Help Singing)
- "Ave Maria" (from Mad About Music)
- "Ave Maria" (from It's a Date)
- "Be a Good Scout" (from That Certain Age)
- "Because" (from Three Smart Girls Grow Up)
- "Begin the Beguine" (from Hers to Hold)
- "Beneath the Lights of Home" (from Nice Girl)
- "The Blue Danube" (from Spring Parade)
- "Brahms' Lullaby" (from I'll Be Yours)
- "Brindisi" ("Libiamo ne' lieti calici)" (from 100 Men and a Girl)
- "Californ-I-Ay"
- "Can't Help Singing" (from Can't Help Singing)
- "Carmena Waltz"
- "Chapel Bells" (from Mad About Music)
- "Cielito Lindo" ("Beautiful Heaven)"
- "Ciribiribin"
- "Clavelitos" (from It Started with Eve)
- "Danny Boy" (from Because of Him)
- "Embraceable You"
- "Every Sunday" (with Judy Garland)
- "Filles de Cadiz" ("The Maids of Cadiz") (from That Certain Age)
- "Gimme a Little Kiss, Will Ya, Huh?" (from Lady on a Train)
- "God Bless America"
- "Goin' Home" (from It Started With Eve)
- "Goodbye" (from Because of Him)
- "Granada" (from I'll Be Yours)
- "A Heart That's Free" (from 100 Men and a Girl)
- "Home! Sweet Home!" (from First Love)
- "Il Bacio" ("The Kiss") (from Three Smart Girls)
- "I'll Follow My Sweet Heart"
- "I'll Take You Home Again Kathleen" (from For the Love of Mary)
- "I'll See You In My Dreams"
- "I Love to Whistle" (from Mad About Music)
- "(I'm) Happy Go Lucky and Free" (from Something in the Wind)
- "(I'm) Happy Go Lucky and Free" (from Something in the Wind)
- "In the Spirit of the Moment" (from His Butler's Sister)
- "Invitation to the Dance" (from Three Smart Girls Grow Up)
- "Italian Street Song"
- "It's a Big Wide Wonderful World" (from For the Love of Mary)
- "It's Dreamtime" (from I'll Be Yours)
- "It's Foolish But It's Fun" (from Spring Parade)
- "It's Only Love" (from Something In The Wind)
- "It's Raining Sunbeams" (from 100 Men and a Girl)
- "Je Veux Vivre" (Roméo et Juliette) (from That Certain Age)
- "Kiss Me Again"
- "La Estrellita" ("Little Star)"
- "Largo al factotum" (The Barber of Seville) (from For the Love of Mary)
- "The Last Rose of Summer" (from Three Smart Girls Grow Up)
- "Loch Lomond" (from It's a Date)
- "Love at Last" (from Nice Girl)
- "Love is All" (from It's a Date)
- "Lover" (from Because of Him)
- "Love's Old Sweet Song"
- "Make Believe"
- "Mighty Like a Rose" (from The Amazing Mrs. Halliday")
- "Molly Malone"
- "More and More" (from Can't Help Singing)
- "More and More/Can't Help Singing" (from Can't Help Singing)
- "Musetta's Waltz" (La bohème) (from It's a Date)
- "My Heart is Singing" (from Three Smart Girls Grow Up)
- "My Hero"
- "My Own" (from That Certain Age)
- "Nessun Dorma" (Turandot) (from His Butler's Sister)
- "Never in a Million Years/ Make Believe"
- "Night and Day" (from Lady on a Train)
- "O Come, All Ye Faithful"
- "Old Folks at Home" (from Nice Girl)
- "The Old Refrain" (from The Amazing Mrs. Holiday)
- "On Moonlight Bay" (from For the Love of Mary)
- "One Fine Day" (Madama Butterfly) (from First Love)
- "One Night of Love"
- "Pace, Pace, Mio Dio" (La forza del destino) (from Up In Central Park)
- "Pale Hands I Loved" (Kashmiri Song) (from Hers to Hold)
- "Perhaps" (from Nice Girl)
- "Poor Butterfly"
- "The Prince"
- "Russian Medley" (from His Butler's Sister)
- "Sari Waltz (Love's Own Sweet Song)" (from I'll Be Yours)
- "Say a Pray'r for the Boys Over There" (from Hers to Hold)
- "Seal It With a Kiss"
- "Seguidilla (Carmen) (from Hers to Hold)
- "Serenade to the Stars" (from Mad About Music)
- "Silent Night" (from Lady on a Train)
- "Someone to Care for Me" (from Three Smart Girls)
- "Something in the Wind" (from Something in the Wind)
- "Spring in My Heart" (from First Love)
- "Spring Will Be a Little Late This Year" (from Christmas Holiday)
- "Swanee – Old Folks at Home" (from Nice Girl)
- "Summertime" (Porgy and Bess)
- "Sweetheart"
- "Thank You America" (from Nice Girl)
- "There'll Always Be An England" (from Nice Girl)
- "The Turntable Song" (from Something in the Wind)
- "Two Guitars" (from His Butler's Sister)
- "Two Hearts"
- "Un bel dì vedremo" (Madama Butterfly) (from First Love)
- "Viennese Waltz" (from For The Love Of Mary)
- "Vissi d'arte (Tosca) (from The Amazing Mrs. Holiday)
- "Waltzing in the Clouds" (from Spring Parade)
- "When April Sings" (from Spring Parade)
- "When I Sing" (from It Started with Eve)
- "When the Roses Bloom Again"
- "When You're Away" (from His Butler's Sister)
- "You Wanna Keep Your Baby Lookin' Right, Don't You" (from Something in the Wind)
- "You're as Pretty as a Picture" (from That Certain Age)

== Radio appearances ==
Date	Series title	Episode title	Ref.
1943	Screen Guild Theatre	"Shadow of a Doubt"	
1936–38	The Eddie Cantor Show	(Series regular)	
1938	Lux Radio Theatre	"Mad About Music"	
1943	The Jack Benny Program	"Guest: Deanna Durbin"	
1948	Screen Guild Players	"Up in Central Park"	

== See also ==
- Academy Juvenile Award
- List of oldest and youngest Academy Award winners and nominees
