= Brodney =

Brodney is a surname. Notable people with the surname include:

- Edward Brodney (1910–2002), American artist
- May Brodney (1894–1973), Australian labour activist and politician
- Oscar Brodney (1907–2008), American lawyer-turned-screenwriter
