= Milton Suskind =

Milton Suskind, also known by the pseudonym Edgar Fairchild, (June 1, 1898 – February 20, 1975) was an American pianist, composer, songwriter, music arranger, music editor, and conductor. He used his own name as a classical pianist and for his music compositions written in the tradition of Western classical music. He adopted the pseudonym Edgar Fairchild when performing, recording, and composing popular music such as jazz. He began this practice at the Ampico Company where he made piano rolls as a performer and arranger from 1917 through the 1920s in a variety of music genres. His work as a music editor at Ampico was equally diverse with his role as music editor extending from overseeing the Ampico rolls of classical pianist and composer Sergei Rachmaninoff and those made by jazz musician Eubie Blake.

Suskind wrote the score to the Broadway musical Florida Girl (1925), and was a contributing composer to the Broadway shows The New Yorkers (1927) and The Illustrators' Show (1936). He also worked as the pianist in the pit orchestras of several Broadway shows; sometimes in piano duos which led to him forming music partnerships with first pianist Ralph Rainger in the 1920s and later Adam Carroll in the 1930s.

In 1938 Suskind went to California to work as the conductor for Eddie Cantor's NBC Radio program. He served as Cantor's music director through 1944 during which time he earned the nickname "Cookie Fairchild". Under his Fairchild pseudonym he worked in Hollywood as a film score composer and conductor. He was under contract with Universal Pictures from 1944-1948. In addition to writing scores to several Universal films, he also worked as a songwriter for film; most often in collaboration with lyricist Jack Brooks.

== Early life and education ==
The son of Sigmund Suskind and Teofila "Tillie" Suskind (née Vorzimer), Milton Suskind was born in New York City on June 1, 1898. He began studying the piano at the age of seven, and at the age of ten he won a scholarship to study at the Institute of Musical Art (now the Juilliard School). At Juilliard he studied the piano and composition. His teacher in the latter subject was Percy Goetschius. Along with his classmate Jacques Wolfe, he was one of 32 piano majors who graduated from the school in 1915. He then began his career as a concert pianist. He was a soloist with the New York Symphony Orchestra under conductor Walter Damrosch at the age of sixteen. In 1916 he performed Ludwig van Beethoven's Piano Concerto No. 4 at Aeolian Hall in a concert featuring students and graduates of the Institute of Musical Art.

Suskind also pursued graduate studies in composition at the Institute of Musical Art. He and the pianist Reuven Kosakoff performed his Prelude and fugue for two pianos in a concert featuring the music created by the school's composition students in 1918.

== New York pianist and composer ==
In 1926 The Philadelphia Inquirer stated that "[Suskind] is known to the musical and theatrical world as two distinct individuals. One of these is Milton Suskind, which is his own name, and under which he writes and plays music of a high order, and the other is Edgar Fairchild, a cognomen which he has assumed for the more popular form of music."

In 1917 Suskind began working as a staff pianist, music arranger, and editor for the Ampico Company which specialized in making reproducing pianos. He made several piano roll recordings as both a classical and popular music pianist for Ampico; using his own name for the classical music recordings and the pseudonym Edgar Fairchild for popular music genres like jazz. With pianist Arthur Loesser he made a piano roll of Pyotr Ilyich Tchaikovsky's Pathétique Symphony in 1920 which was conducted by Artur Bodanzky. A somewhat novelty piano roll he recorded for Ampico was Melody in A Major by Charles G. Dawes, the 30th Vice President of the United States. Other works he recorded for Ampico included Robert Schumann's Novelletten, Ethelbert Nevin's A Day in Venice, and the overture to Franz von Suppé's Pique Dame which he performed with Julius Bürger to name just a small number.

Suskind served as Sergei Rachmaninoff's music editor for the thirty Ampico piano rolls that Rachmaninoff made for the company. He served as editor and assistant pianist for Ampico recordings made with Eubie Blake in late 1917 and early 1918; including a recording of "Good Night Angeline". Included on the record Blues and Rags (1917-1921), AllMusic described this recording as a "rare piano duet" as Blake did not often perform with other pianists.

He wrote the score to the musical Florida Girl; a work which premiered in October 1925 with the title Oh You! at Poli's Theatre in Washington, DC. Its name was changed to Florida Girl and it opened at Broadway's Lyric Theatre on November 2, 1925 where it ran for forty performances. While The New York Times gave a positive review of the performances of its stars Lester Allen and Vivienne Segal, it was skewered in Variety with its critic dismissing the work as "boresome, tedious, uninspired, brazenly plugging production that masquerades as entertainment." He later co-authored the music to the 1927 musical The New Yorkers with Arthur Schwartz and Charles M. Schwab, and was one of several contributing composers to the 1936 revue The Illustrators' Show which featured lyrics by Frank Loesser. He also wrote the title song used in the Broadway play Lady Precious Stream (1936).

In the mid 1920s Suskind was the pianist for The Earl Carroll Vanities on Broadway, and in 1925 he recorded music from the show as a member of Ross Gorman's Earl Carroll Orchestra. In 1926 he used the Fairchild pseudonym for several recordings he made as a solo pianist with Ralph Rainger and his orchestra for the Victor Talking Machine Company; including a medley of songs from George White's Scandals. Suskind had earlier performed in the 1922 iteration of the Scandals as a member of the Original Piano Trio whose other members included George Dilworth and Herbert Clair.

In November 1926 Suskind performed in concert with the violinist Arcadie Birkenholz at The Town Hall with a program that included George Frideric Handel's Violin sonata in D major, Camille Saint-Saëns's Violin Concerto No. 3, Ernest Bloch's Baal Shem, Fritz Kreisler's La Gitana, Henryk Wieniawski's Caprice, and music from Nikolai Rimsky-Korsakov's The Golden Cockerel. It was one of several concerts the two men performed together at that venue.

Under his Fairchild pseudonym, Suskind also worked as the pianist for several other Broadway shows; including Queen High (1926) on which he worked with fellow pianist Ralph Rainger. The two men formed a piano duo act, Fairchild & Rainger, which they toured successfully in vaudeville. In the 1928 Broadway musical Cross My Heart Fairchild & Rainger played as a member of the Rialto Trio.

Other Broadway shows for which Suskind played included Calling All Stars (1934) and Babes in Arms (1937). The other staff pianist in Babes in Arms was Adam Carroll whom played with Suskind in the piano duo Fairchild & Carroll. At the behest of Richard Rodgers and Lorenz Hart the duo recorded the songs "Where or When" and "Imagine" with Liberty Music Shop Records in 1937. That same year they shared top billing with Marian Anderson on the July 18, 1937 broadcast of the radio program The Magic Key of RCA. By himself Suskind made a 1937 record with the studio ensemble Jimmy Ray and his orchestra.

== Later life and career ==
Suskind used his pseudonym Edgar Fairchild in his later career in radio and film. In 1934 the singer Jack Whiting introduced his songs "A Recipe for Love" and "Knock Wood" on the radio." In 1938 he began working as a conductor for NBC Radio for a reoccurring program starring Eddie Cantor with the program's orchestra billed as the Edgar Fairchild Orchestra. At this time he was still living in New York City, and commuted to California when making the radio program in Los Angeles. Some of the guest stars who sang with his orchestra on the program included Broadway star Fanny Brice and opera singers Giovanni Martinelli and Gladys Swarthout. In November 1940 he conducted a choir that supported Dinah Shore when she performed the song "Yes, My Darling Daughter" on Cantor's program. He notably conducted the Edgar Fairchild Orchestra for a 1942 soundie short film starring Ginny Simms and Gale Gordon in which they performed the song "Rose of No Man's Land".

Suskind returned to Broadway in 1939 to perform with Cantor in his show at Loew's State Theatre. He ultimately moved to California as his conducting opportunities in Los Angeles expanded. He gained the nickname "Cookie Fairchild" while leading the radio orchestra for Cantor's program during World War II. The program became associated with the charity March of Dimes which it promoted. During the war, he and his wife entertained American troops stationed at the Desert Training Center (known as Camp Young). He was still conducting Cantor's program as late as February 1944.

Suskind made his first foray into the film industry working for Universal Pictures as Deanna Durbin's vocal coach for the film Christmas Holiday (1944). After this project, he signed a four year contract with Universal to work in the studio's music department. He continued to serve as Durbin's "personal music director" on other films such as Because of Him (1946). With lyricist Jack Brooks he wrote seven songs for the Abbott and Costello film Here Come the Co-Eds; some of which were performed by Peggy Ryan and others by a musical group led by Phil Spitalny. He later re-teamed with Brooks to write songs for the films Frontier Gal (1945), The Naughty Nineties (1945), and Idea Girl (1946). They also wrote the songs "Heartbreak", "I Want to Be Talked About", and "Time Will Tell" for the film Black Angel (1946) which were sung by June Vincent.

Suskind wrote the film scores to several Universal films in the mid to late 1940s, including In Society (1944), Pursuit to Algiers (1945), Senorita from the West (1945), Little Giant (1946), Blonde Alibi (1946), She Wrote the Book (1946), and For the Love of Mary (1948). For RKO Pictures he wrote the score to If You Knew Susie (1948). He also worked as the music director for several other films; including conducting the music for the 1944 musical film Can't Help Singing which featured a score by Jerome Kern and Yip Harburg, and the 1945 horror film House of Dracula for which he also composed the music.

Suskind died at Woodland Hills Hospital in Los Angeles, California on February 20, 1975 at the age of 76.

== Partial list of works ==
=== Songs ===
- "A Side Street Off Broadway" (1927, with Henry Meyers)
- "Park Avenue is Going to Town" (1936, with Milton Pascal)
- "I Need Love" (1944, ; with Milton Pascal; written for the film Night Club Girl)
- "Tango" (1945, written for the film Delightfully Dangerous)
- "Lonely Little Ranch House" (1947, with Jack Brooks; written for the film Smash-Up, the Story of a Woman)
