= Little Egypt (film) =

1951 film by Frederick de Cordova

- Original film poster
- Directed by: Frederick de Cordova
- Screenplay by: Oscar Brodney; Doris Gilbert
- Story by: Oscar Brodney
- Produced by: Jack J. Gross
- Starring: Mark Stevens; Rhonda Fleming
- Cinematography: Russell Metty
- Edited by: Edward Curtiss
- Production company: Universal-International
- Distributed by: Universal-International
- Release dates: August 3, 1951 (Chicago); August 29, 1951 (New York)
- Running time: 81 minutes
- Country: United States
- Language: English
- Box office: $1.1 million (US rentals)

Little Egypt is a 1951 American Technicolor comedy drama film directed by Frederick de Cordova and starring Mark Stevens and Rhonda Fleming. It is a highly fictionalized biography of the dancer Little Egypt in the 1890s.

== Plot ==
Looking to feature authentic Egyptians in his exhibit at the Chicago World's Fair, Cyrus Graydon visit Cairo, where he is joined by a pasha and by an American con artist named Wayne Cravat. The pasha falls in love with the exotic dancer Izora. Although Graydon tries to discourage her, she travels to Chicago, where she identifies herself as a genuine Egyptian princess.

Cravat pretends to be romantically interested in Graydon's daughter Sylvia in order to curry favor with her father. Izora is jealous and retaliates by trying to seduce Sylvia's fiancé Oliver Doane.

When she dances a scandalous "hootchy-kootchy" dance in public, the police place Izora under arrest. She insists in court that, as a princess, she is entitled to dance any way that she pleases. However, the prosecution has discovered that Izora is actually Betty Randolph of Jersey City, New Jersey.

The pasha appears just in time to attest that she is his cousin, and therefore a true princess. However, others discover that the pasha himself is a fake.

== Cast ==
- Mark Stevens as Wayne Cravat
- Rhonda Fleming as Izora
- Nancy Guild as Sylvia Graydon
- Charles Drake as Oliver Doane
- Tom D'Andrea as Max
- Minor Watson as Cyrus Graydon
- Steven Geray as Pasha
- Verna Felton as Mrs. Samantha Doane
- John Litel as Shuster
- Kathryn Givney as Cynthia Graydon
- Fritz Feld as Professor
- Dan Riss as Prosecutor
- Jack George as Meheddi
- Edward Clark as Judge (as Ed Clark)
- John Gallaudet as O'Reilly
- Freeman Lusk as Spinelli
- Leon Belasco as Moulai

== Production ==
The film was announced in October 1950 and filming began in late November.

Director Frederick de Cordova later said: "At least the picture got me back in the musical area where I had worked in New York. Mark Stevens was an attractive, competent actor and Rhonda Fleming was a very pretty girl. We tested a lot of women for that part. Whoever played it had to be voluptuous and able to move sexily. The picture was kind of a pot boiler but we got paid for it. The results weren't terrible although I don't think I heightened Fleming's career or that the picture heightened mine."

== Release ==
The film's world premiere was held at the Chicago Theatre in Chicago on August 3, 1951, with stars Mark Stevens and Rhonda Fleming in attendance. Chicago television station WBKB aired a live telecast from the theater.

== Reception ==
In a contemporary review for The New York Times, critic Oscar Godbout called the film "no great shakes as a dramatic endeavor despite plenty of appealing color" and wrote: "Everything concerned, this is a pretty standard effort, for in it, real entertainment is as sparse as geysers in the Sahara, and only occasionally will patrons be roused from their indifference. Miss Fleming is graceful enough, but the suspicion remains that the original edition of Little Egypt, back in 1893, must have been more exciting than her 1951 counterpart."

Critic Edwin Schallert of the Los Angeles Times wrote: "If anything 'Little Egypt' has too many complications for comfort and none of them is particularly vital. The humor that might augment the zest of the proceedings is lacking too much of the time. The picture, therefore, strains to get results which, while colorful in their way, fall short of genuine interest. Laughs punctuate the action and are good when not forced."
