= Ralph Rainger =

American songwriter (1901–1942)

Background information
- Born: Ralph Reichenthal; October 7, 1901; New York City, U.S.
- Died: October 23, 1942 (aged 41) near Palm Springs, California, U.S.
- Occupation: Composer
- Instrument: Piano
- Years active: 1922–1942

Ralph Rainger (né Reichenthal; October 7, 1901 – October 23, 1942) was an American composer of popular music principally for films.

== Biography ==
Born Ralph Reichenthal in New York City, United States, Rainger initially embarked on a legal career, having obtained his law degree at Brown University in 1926. He had, however, studied piano from a young age and attended the Institute of Musical Art in New York. Public performances include radio broadcasts from New York and WOR (New Jersey) as early as 1922. These were as soloist, accompanist to singers, and as duo-pianist with Adam Carroll or "Edgar Fairchild" (the name Milton Suskind used for commercial work).

He also prepared piano rolls between 1922 and 1928 for Ampico, Standard, and DeLuxe. Some of these used the "Reichenthal" surname, others the "Rainger" name he was gradually adopting commercially.

Other early musical activities include arranging for bandleader Ray Miller. His own band leading included a 1923 engagement—Ralph Reichenthal Orchestra—at the Asbury Park (NJ) Claredon-Brunswick Hotel.

Rainger's first credit on Broadway, 1926's "Queen High", was as duo-pianist in the pit with Fairchild, following the show's break-in in Philadelphia. He later played for 1928's "Angela" and "Cross my Heart".

His first hit "Moanin' Low", with lyrics by Howard Dietz, was written for Clifton Webb's co-star Libby Holman in the 1929 revue The Little Show. Webb, tracing the song's origin, noted that Rainger was Webb's accompanist in vaudeville when Webb was invited to appear in the new show, and that Webb had asked Rainger for a contribution.

With the advent of motion picture sound and the film musical, Rainger and other songwriters found work in Hollywood. He teamed up with lyricist Leo Robin to produce a string of successful film songs, including "I'll Take An Option On You", from the Broadway hit show Tattle Tales (1933).

In the years that followed, Rainger wrote or collaborated on such hit songs as "I Wished on the Moon", "Love in Bloom" (comedian Jack Benny's theme song), "Faithful Forever", "Easy Living", "June in January", "Blue Hawaii", and with Leo Robin on the 1938 Oscar-winning song "Thanks for the Memory", sung by Bob Hope in the film The Big Broadcast of 1938.

Songwriting for Hollywood's mass audience had its challenges, as lyricist Leo Robin noted:

On the stage after all, you can aim at a particular audience. You can please just New York, or just a small portion of New York. In pictures you have to please the whole country, and most of the world besides. The songs must have universal appeal, get down to something that every human being feels and can understand. That isn't so hard really, once you get the trick of simplicity.

Rainger paid one year's tuition fees to the Austrian composer Arnold Schoenberg in advance, so that Schoenberg could pay for the transportation of his belongings to Los Angeles from Paris in 1933.

Rainger died in a plane crash near Palm Springs, California, in 1942. He was a passenger aboard American Airlines Flight 28, a DC-3 airliner that was involved in a mid-air collision with a U.S. Army Air Corps bomber. Rainger, then age 41, was survived by his wife, Elizabeth ("Betty"), an eight-year-old son, and two daughters, aged five and one. In the initial 1942 press coverage of the crash, the collision was not acknowledged; Betty Rainger later sued American Airlines and won a substantial judgement late in 1943.

== Film credits ==
Film credits include:

- 1930 - Tom Sawyer
- 1930 - The Virtuous Sin
- 1932 - The Big Broadcast
- 1932 - A Farewell to Arms
- 1932 - This Is the Night
- 1933 - A Bedtime Story
- 1933 - From Hell to Heaven
- 1933 - She Done Him Wrong
- 1933 - International House
- 1933 - Three-Cornered Moon
- 1934 - Kiss and Make-Up
- 1934 - Come on Marines
- 1934 - Bolero
- 1934 - All of Me
- 1934 - Little Miss Marker
- 1934 - Search for Beauty
- 1934 - Six of a Kind
- 1935 - The Devil Is a Woman
- 1935 - The Big Broadcast of 1936
- 1935 - Ruggles of Red Gap
- 1936 - The Big Broadcast of 1937
- 1936 - Rhythm on the Range
- 1936 - Rose of the Rancho
- 1936 - Poppy
- 1936 - Palm Springs
- 1936 - Three Cheers for Love
- 1937 - King of Gamblers
- 1937 - The Big Broadcast of 1938, including the Academy Award-winning song "Thanks for the Memory"
- 1937 - Blossoms on Broadway
- 1937 - Hills of Old Wyoming
- 1937 - Ebb Tide
- 1937 - Swing High, Swing Low
- 1937 - Waikiki Wedding
- 1937 - Souls at Sea
- 1938 - Her Jungle Love
- 1938 - Artists and Models Abroad
- 1938 - Romance in the Dark
- 1938 - The Texans
- 1939 - Gulliver's Travels, including the Academy Award nominated song "Faithful Forever"
- 1939 - $1000 a Touchdown
- 1941 - Cadet Girl
- 1941 - A Yank in the R.A.F.
- 1941 - Tall, Dark and Handsome
- 1941 - Rise and Shine
- 1941 - New York Town
- 1942 - Footlight Serenade
- 1942 - True to the Army
- 1942 - My Gal Sal

== See also ==
- Category:Songs with music by Ralph Rainger
- Uncle Sam Gets Around, 1941 song
