= Ted J. Kent =

American film editor (1901–1986)

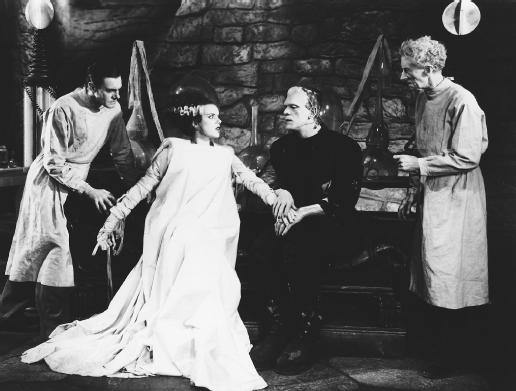
- Bride gip.
- Born: Theodore John Kent; October 6, 1901; Illinois, U.S.
- Died: June 17, 1986 (aged 84); Orange County, California, U.S.
- Other name: Ted Kent
- Occupation: Film editor
- Years active: 1927–1967

Theodore John Kent (October 6, 1901 – June 17, 1986) was an American film editor who was nominated for Best Film Editing at the 1964 Academy Awards for the film Father Goose. He worked on over 150 films from 1927 to 1967, including many classic Universal horror films.

== Selected filmography ==
Editor
Year	Film	Director	Notes	Other notes
1927	Uncle Tom's Cabin	Harry A. Pollard		
1928	The Grip of the Yukon	Ernst Laemmle		
1928	The Foreign Legion	Edward Sloman		
1929	Born to the Saddle	Joseph Levigard		
1929	It Can Be Done	Fred C. Newmeyer		
1929	His Lucky Day	Edward F. Cline		
1929	College Love	Nat Ross		
1929	The Drake Case	Edward Laemmle	First collaboration with Edward Laemmle	
1930	Captain of the Guard	John S. Robertson		
1931	Bad Sister	Hobart Henley	First collaboration with Hobart Henley	
1931	Seed	John M. Stahl	First collaboration with John M. Stahl	
1931	Up for Murder	Monta Bell		
1931	Lasca of the Rio Grande	Edward Laemmle	Second collaboration with Edward Laemmle	
1931	A House Divided	William Wyler	First collaboration with William Wyler	
1932	Night World	Hobart Henley	Second collaboration with Hobart Henley	
1932	Tom Brown of Culver	William Wyler	Second collaboration with William Wyler	
1932	Okay, America!	Tay Garnett	First collaboration with Tay Garnett	
1932	They Just Had to Get Married	Edward Ludwig	First collaboration with Edward Ludwig	
1933	The Kiss Before the Mirror	James Whale	First collaboration with James Whale	
1933	Her First Mate	William Wyler	Third collaboration with William Wyler	
1933	The Invisible Man	James Whale	Second collaboration with James Whale	
1933	By Candlelight	James Whale	Third collaboration with James Whale	
1934	Glamour	William Wyler	Fourth collaboration with William Wyler	
1934	The Love Captive	Max Marcin		
1934	One More River	James Whale	Fourth collaboration with James Whale	
1935	Night Life of the Gods	Lowell Sherman		
1935	Straight from the Heart	Scott Beal		
1935	Bride of Frankenstein	James Whale	Fifth collaboration with James Whale	
1935	Atlantic Adventure	Albert S. Rogell	First collaboration with Albert S. Rogell	
1935	Remember Last Night?	James Whale	Sixth collaboration with James Whale	
1936	Next Time We Love	Edward H. Griffith		
1936	Show Boat	James Whale	Seventh collaboration with James Whale	
1936	My Man Godfrey	Gregory La Cava		
1936	The Magnificent Brute	John G. Blystone		
1936	Three Smart Girls	Henry Koster	First collaboration with Henry Koster	
1937	The Road Back	James Whale	Eighth collaboration with James Whale	
1937	Merry-Go-Round of 1938	Irving Cummings		
1938	Mad About Music	Norman Taurog		
1938	The Lady in the Morgue	Otis Garrett	First collaboration with Otis Garrett	
1938	Letter of Introduction	John M. Stahl	Second collaboration with John M. Stahl	
1938	Service de Luxe	Rowland V. Lee	First collaboration with Rowland V. Lee	
1939	Son of Frankenstein	Rowland V. Lee	Second collaboration with Rowland V. Lee	
1939	Three Smart Girls Grow Up	Henry Koster	Second collaboration with Henry Koster	
1939	The Sun Never Sets	Rowland V. Lee	Third collaboration with Rowland V. Lee	
1939	Unexpected Father	Charles Lamont	First collaboration with Charles Lamont	
1939	Missing Evidence	Phil Rosen	First collaboration with Phil Rosen	
1940	Green Hell	James Whale	Ninth collaboration with James Whale	
1940	Double Alibi	Phil Rosen	Second collaboration with Phil Rosen	
1940	Enemy Agent	Lew Landers	First collaboration with Lew Landers	
1940	La Conga Nights	Lew Landers	Second collaboration with Lew Landers	
1940	Love, Honor and Oh-Baby!	Charles Lamont	Second collaboration with Charles Lamont	
1940	Black Diamonds	Christy Cabanne		
1940	Margie	Otis Garrett; Paul Gerard Smith	Second collaboration with Otis Garrett	
1940	Seven Sinners	Tay Garnett	Second collaboration with Tay Garnett	
1941	Back Street	Robert Stevenson		
1941	Mr. Dynamite	John Rawlins		
1941	The Black Cat	Albert S. Rogell	Second collaboration with Albert S. Rogell	
1941	Burma Convoy	Noel M. Smith		
1941	Appointment for Love	William A. Seiter	First collaboration with William A. Seiter	
1941	Swing It Soldier	Harold Young		
1941	The Wolf Man	George Waggner		
1941	Hellzapoppin'	H. C. Potter		Uncredited
1942	North to the Klondike	Erle C. Kenton	First collaboration with Erle C. Kenton	
1942	The Ghost of Frankenstein	Erle C. Kenton	Second collaboration with Erle C. Kenton	
1942	Broadway	William A. Seiter	Second collaboration with William A. Seiter	
1942	Madame Spy	Roy William Neill		
1943	The Amazing Mrs. Holliday	Bruce Manning		
1943	Hers to Hold	Frank Ryan	First collaboration with Frank Ryan	
1943	His Butler's Sister	Frank Borzage	First collaboration with Frank Borzage	
1944	Boss of Boomtown	Ray Taylor		
1944	Christmas Holiday	Robert Siodmak	First collaboration with Robert Siodmak	
1944	Patrick the Great	Frank Ryan	Second collaboration with Frank Ryan	
1944	Can't Help Singing	Frank Ryan	Third collaboration with Frank Ryan	
1945	Honeymoon Ahead	Reginald LeBorg		
1945	Lady on a Train	Charles David		
1946	Because of Him	Richard Wallace		
1946	So Goes My Love	Frank Ryan	Fourth collaboration with Frank Ryan	
1946	The Runaround	Charles Lamont	Third collaboration with Charles Lamont	
1946	Magnificent Doll	Frank Borzage	Second collaboration with Frank Borzage	
1947	Time Out of Mind	Robert Siodmak	Second collaboration with Robert Siodmak	
1947	The Exile	Max Ophüls	First collaboration with Max Ophüls	
1948	Letter from an Unknown Woman	Max Ophüls	Second collaboration with Max Ophüls	
1948	For the Love of Mary	Fred de Cordova	First collaboration with Fred de Cordova	
1949	Criss Cross	Robert Siodmak	Third collaboration with Robert Siodmak	
1949	City Across the River	Maxwell Shane		
1949	Johnny Stool Pigeon	William Castle		
1949	Yes Sir, That's My Baby	George Sherman	First collaboration with George Sherman	
1950	South Sea Sinner	H. Bruce Humberstone	First collaboration with H. Bruce Humberstone	
1950	Sierra	Alfred E. Green		
1950	Spy Hunt	George Sherman	Second collaboration with George Sherman	
1950	Frenchie	Louis King		
1951	Bedtime for Bonzo	Fred de Cordova	Second collaboration with Fred de Cordova	
1951	Smuggler's Island	Edward Ludwig	Second collaboration with Edward Ludwig	
1951	Thunder on the Hill	Douglas Sirk	First collaboration with Douglas Sirk	
1951	The Raging Tide	George Sherman	Third collaboration with George Sherman	
1951	Flame of Araby	Charles Lamont	Fourth collaboration with Charles Lamont	
1952	Steel Town	George Sherman	Fourth collaboration with George Sherman	
1952	The Battle at Apache Pass	George Sherman	Fifth collaboration with George Sherman	
1952	Scarlet Angel	Sidney Salkow		
1952	Ma and Pa Kettle at the Fair	Charles Barton		
1952	Bonzo Goes to College	Fred de Cordova	Third collaboration with Fred de Cordova	
1952	Horizons West	Budd Boetticher		
1953	Gunsmoke	Nathan Juran	First collaboration with Nathan Juran	
1953	Law and Order	Nathan Juran	Second collaboration with Nathan Juran	
1953	The Golden Blade	Nathan Juran	Third collaboration with Nathan Juran	
1953	The Glass Web	Jack Arnold	First collaboration with Jack Arnold	
1953	Walking My Baby Back Home	Lloyd Bacon		
1954	Creature from the Black Lagoon	Jack Arnold	Second collaboration with Jack Arnold	
1954	Rails Into Laramie	Jesse Hibbs		
1954	Francis Joins the WACS	Arthur Lubin		
1954	The Black Shield of Falworth	Rudolph Maté		
1954	Destry	George Marshall		
1955	The Purple Mask	H. Bruce Humberstone	Second collaboration with H. Bruce Humberstone	
1955	Foxfire	Joseph Pevney	First collaboration with Joseph Pevney	
1955	The Private War of Major Benson	Jerry Hopper		
1956	Behind the High Wall	Abner Biberman	First collaboration with Abner Biberman	
1956	Away All Boats	Joseph Pevney	Second collaboration with Joseph Pevney	
1956	Kelly and Me	Robert Z. Leonard		
1957	Man Afraid	Harry Keller	First collaboration with Harry Keller	
1957	The Midnight Story	Joseph Pevney	Third collaboration with Joseph Pevney	
1957	Tammy and the Bachelor	Joseph Pevney	Fourth collaboration with Joseph Pevney	
1957	Man of a Thousand Faces	Joseph Pevney	Fifth collaboration with Joseph Pevney	
1957	Flood Tide	Abner Biberman	Second collaboration with Abner Biberman	
1958	A Time to Love and a Time to Die	Douglas Sirk	Second collaboration with Douglas Sirk	
1958	Monster on the Campus	Jack Arnold	Third collaboration with Jack Arnold	
1959	The Rabbit Trap	Philip Leacock		
1959	This Earth Is Mine	Henry King		
1959	Operation Petticoat	Blake Edwards		
1962	That Touch of Mink	Delbert Mann		
1963	The Ugly American	George Englund		
1964	The Brass Bottle	Harry Keller	Second collaboration with Harry Keller	
1964	Island of the Blue Dolphins	James B. Clark		
1964	Father Goose	Ralph Nelson		
1965	Mirage	Edward Dmytryk		
1966	Blindfold	Philip Dunne		
1966	The Appaloosa	Sidney J. Furie		
1967	Rough Night in Jericho	Arnold Laven		

Editorial department
Year	Film	Director	Role	Notes
1938	Mad About Music	Norman Taurog	Cutter	Uncredited

Shorts

Editor
Year	Film	Director
1941	In the Groove	Larry Ceballos
1942	Rhumba Rhythms	Larry Ceballos
1942	Jivin' Jam Session	Reginald LeBorg
1946	Swingin' Down the Scale	Will Cowan
1947	Record Party	Will Cowan
1948	Red Ingle and His Natural Seven	Will Cowan
1949	Prairie Pirates	Will Cowan
1949	Rhythm of the Mambo	Will Cowan
1949	The Pecos Pistol	Will Cowan
1949	Herman's Herd	Will Cowan
1949	Boundaries Unlimited	Thomas Mead
1950	Skylarkin' Time	Will Cowan
1950	Universal Musical Short 3655: Singin' and Swingin'	Will Cowan
1950	Western Courage	Will Cowan
1957	Golden Ladder	George Robinson

TV series

Editor
Year	Title	Notes
1959	The Rifleman	1 episode
1960	The Detectives	1 episode
1960	Black Saddle	3 episodes
1960	Michael Shayne	2 episodes
1960	The Westerner	4 episodes
1959−61	The DuPont Show with June Allyson	3 episodes
1960−61	Dante	2 episodes
1960−61	The Law and Mr. Jones	6 episodes
1961	Zane Grey Theatre	1 episode
1961	Target: The Corruptors!	1 episode
1964−65	Valentine's Day	3 episodes
