= The Gal Who Took the West =

1949 film by Frederick de Cordova

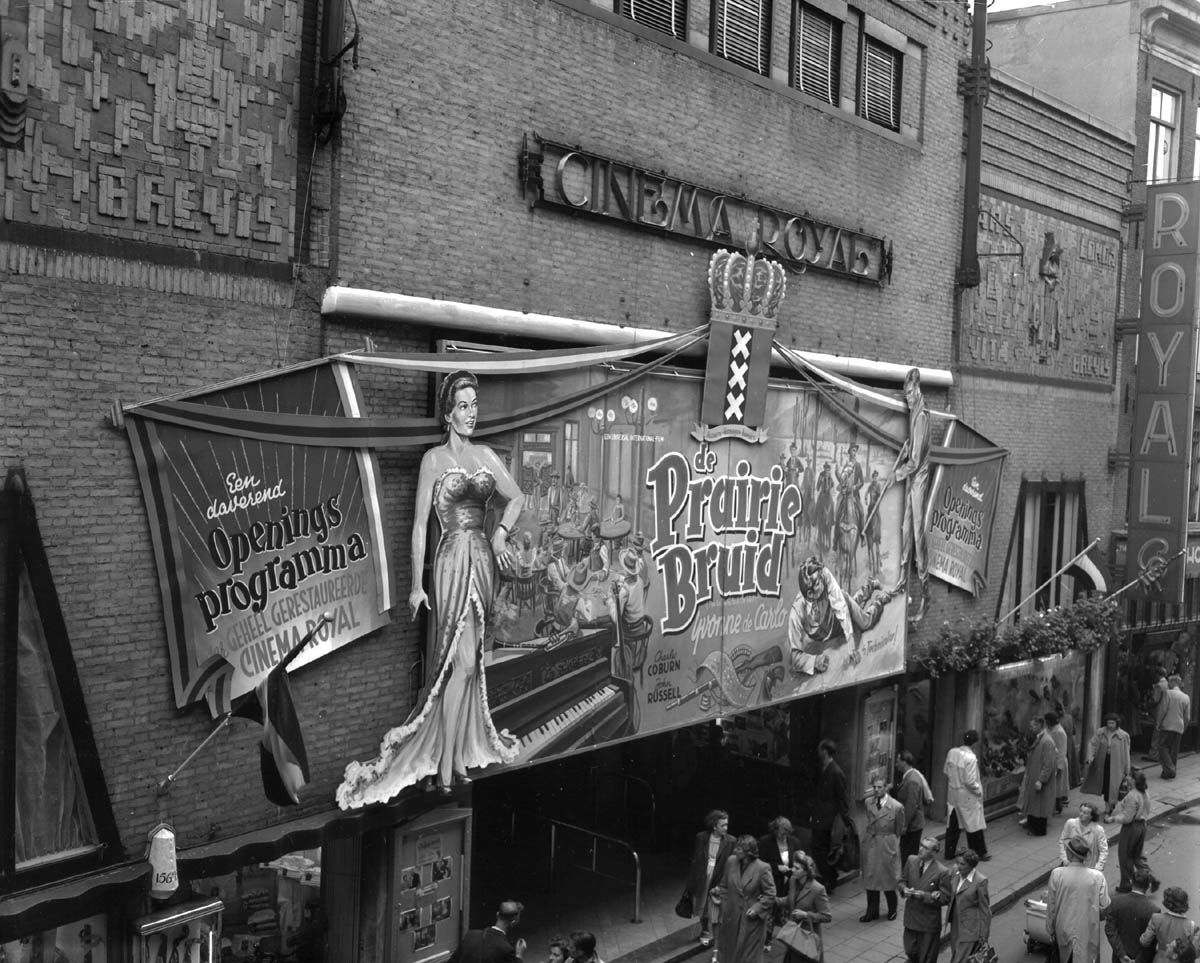
- Film being shown in 1950 at a cinema in Amsterdam
- Directed by: Frederick de Cordova
- Screenplay by: William Bowers; Oscar Brodney
- Story by: William Bowers; Oscar Brodney
- Produced by: Robert Arthur
- Starring: Yvonne De Carlo; Charles Coburn; Scott Brady; John Russell
- Cinematography: William H. Daniels
- Edited by: Milton Carruth
- Music by: Frank Skinner
- Color process: Technicolor
- Production company: Universal International Pictures
- Distributed by: Universal Pictures
- Release date: September 1949
- Running time: 84 minutes
- Country: United States
- Language: English

The Gal Who Took the West is a 1949 American Western film directed by Frederick de Cordova starring Yvonne De Carlo, Charles Coburn, Scott Brady and John Russell. It was nominated for an award by the Writers Guild of America 1950.

== Plot ==
A journalist is writing an article on the O'Hara family of Arizona. They tell about the time in the 1890s when a girl, Lily, was caught in a feud between two O'Haras.

== Cast ==
- Yvonne De Carlo as Lillian 'Lily' Marlowe
- Charles Coburn as Gen Michael O'Hara
- Scott Brady as Lee O'Hara
- John Russell as Grant O'Hara
- Myrna Dell as Nancy
- James Millican as Hawley
- Clem Bevans as Hawley (as old Timer)
- Bob Stevenson as Ted
- Houseley Stevenson as Ted (as old Timer)
- Robin Short as Bartender
- Russell Simpson as Bartender (as old Timer)
- John Litel as Colonel Logan
- James Todd as Douglas Andrews
- Edward Earle as Mr. Nolan

== Production ==
The film was originally known as The Western Story. It was the idea of William Bowers, about three interpretations of a single incident in the life of a Western pioneer; it would be told in flashback from an old person's home. An article in Life magazine about gunfighters who lived in a Prescott, Arizona nursing home was Bowers' inspiration. Bowers, who at this time had a $750-a-week contract with Universal, wrote the script in four weeks. Bowers says Billy Wilder wanted to buy the script for $100,000 and Universal were interested, but Bowers persuaded the studio to make the film themselves. Bowers said "they were gonna do it with Susan Hayward. Then they had a meeting and they said, "Why do we always go off the lot to get people? We got people here." Well, they ended up doing it with Yvonne DeCarlo and John Russell and Scott Brady, and it went right out the window."

William Bowers and Robert Arthur were assigned to make it in December 1947.

In April 1948, Deanna Durbin and Charles Coburn were announced for the lead roles. Jerome Hines was signed for a support role. By November, Durbin had dropped out and Universal replaced her with Yvonne De Carlo. Stephen McNally and Howard Duff were given support roles, but they dropped out and were replaced by Scott Brady and John Russell (the latter borrowed from 20th Century Fox).

Filming started in February 1949. The film was retitled The Gal Who Took the West during editing.
