= Identity Unknown =

Identity Unknown is the title of two films:

- Identity Unknown (1945 film), an American film starring Richard Arlen
- Identity Unknown (1960 film), a British drama featuring Richard Wyler and Pauline Yates
