= For the Love of Mary =

1948 film by Frederick de Cordova

- Theatrical release poster
- Directed by: Frederick de Cordova
- Written by: Oscar Brodney
- Produced by: Robert Arthur
- Starring: Deanna Durbin; Edmond O'Brien; Don Taylor; Jeffrey Lynn
- Cinematography: William H. Daniels
- Edited by: Ted J. Kent
- Music by: Frank Skinner
- Production company: Universal Pictures
- Distributed by: Universal Pictures
- Release date: September 1, 1948
- Running time: 90 minutes
- Country: United States
- Language: English

For the Love of Mary is a 1948 American romantic comedy film directed by Frederick de Cordova and starring Deanna Durbin, Edmond O'Brien, Don Taylor, and Jeffrey Lynn. Written by Oscar Brodney, the film is about a young woman who takes a job at the White House as a switchboard operator and soon receives help with her love life from Supreme Court justices and the President of the United States. For the Love of Mary was the last film by Deanna Durbin, who withdrew from the entertainment business the following year to live a private life in France.

Durbin's third husband Charles David said she "hated" making her last three films and that she would watch all her old movies except those three.

== Plot ==
Mary Peppertree starts a new job as a telephone switchboard operator at the White House, where her father Timothy has been working as a guard for many years. A former Supreme Court telephone operator, Mary takes her first call from David Paxton, an ichthyologist who insists on speaking to the President about a political issue involving a small Pacific island. After hanging up on him twice, Mary spends the rest of her day fielding calls from various Supreme Court justices who attempt to reconcile her with her former fiancé, Phillip Manning, a Justice Department attorney.

Later that night, Mary meets Justice Peabody at a restaurant to discuss her breakup with Phillip, who is also there. After resisting their efforts to reunite her with Phillip, Mary tells Phillip that she broke their engagement not because she saw him with another woman, but because she was not jealous about it. Their conversation about her hard day at the White House fending off calls from the "fish peddler" is overheard by David, also in the restaurant, who then assures Mary that he will speak to the President, despite her interference. He then storms out.

The next morning at the White House gate, David apologizes for his actions the night before, and attempts to bribe Mary with flowers and candy, only to have them thrown back into his face. Later, at the switchboard, Mary receives a call from the President. When Mary hiccups into the phone, the President sends his executive secretary, Harvey Elwood, to check on her condition and offers her a paper bag to breathe into. Phillip calls, expecting to drive her to Justice Peabody's party that night, but she declines, not wanting to resume their relationship. Later, as she is leaving work, Mary must drive David off the White House grounds to prevent his arrest. Mary asks David to escort her to the party, offering to introduce him to the President's secretary in exchange for the favor.

Meanwhile, the President, having overheard Mary telling Phillip that she would rather stay home than attend the party with him, sends Lt. Tom Farrington, a naval aide at the White House, to escort Mary. At the party, they cause a stir and not a little jealousy in Phillip. After a pleasant evening of singing around the piano, Tom escorts Mary home, where she notices they're being watched by her father from an upstairs window. After she kisses Tom goodnight and he leaves, she is confronted by David, who's been waiting on the porch all night. David kisses a startled Mary, who starts to hiccup again.

The next day, when the President learns that Mary was upset about not keeping her date with David, he calls the fish expert himself to express his regrets, but then decides David's 'obsession' with fish means he is a nut. Later over lunch, after David explains his situation in full, Mary tells David she will arrange a meeting for him with Phillip, who can help him with his political issue. That afternoon at the Peppertree home, Tom arrives with presidential orders to take Mary to a White House movie screening. When Phillip learns that Mary is with Tom, he questions David about his relationship with Mary. The frustrated marine biologist announces he is leaving town and that everyone in Washington seems to have a "Mary Peppertree fixation."

Meanwhile, Tom's friend, newspaper publisher Samuel Litchfield, complains to Elwood about Tom's involvement with Mary, a mere switchboard operator. When Mary and Tom arrive together at the restaurant, the owner, Gustav Heindel, tells Elwood he saw Mary kissing David. Elwood decides to handle the matter with the Navy personally. Phillip offers to put the Justice Department on the case and promises to clear up the matter in two days.

That night, at Elwood's request, David takes Mary out on a date in Tom's place. Afterwards, back home in front of her house, upon kissing David, Mary breaks out in hiccups again, a sign that she is in love. Then both Phillip and Tom show up, and Phillip says these circumstances are being contrived by others, claiming Tom is a 'patsy' for him, and David is a 'patsy' for Tom. David, further confused and jealous, leaves the three of them in frustration.

The next morning, Mary receives calls from Gustav and the Supreme Court justices congratulating her on her engagement to Phillip, and a call from the President congratulating her on her engagement to Tom! When Elwood learns that David is not technically a citizen of the United States, he has the young man arrested for illegally entering the country. Elwood soon discovers, however, that the Pacific island on which David was born and holds the deed to, is now home to a $300 million strategic U.S. Naval base. If David is declared an alien, the Navy could be forced to move. Later that day, everyone arrives at Gustav's restaurant to try to resolve the issue. After meeting with the President's advisors, David fashions a Senate resolution for the American annexation of his island if Phillip and Tom are given appointments far from Washington, and he and Gustav are made United States citizens. The government readily agrees, and when Mary calls the President with the good news, David interrupts her conversation with a kiss, causing both of them to hiccup.

== Cast ==
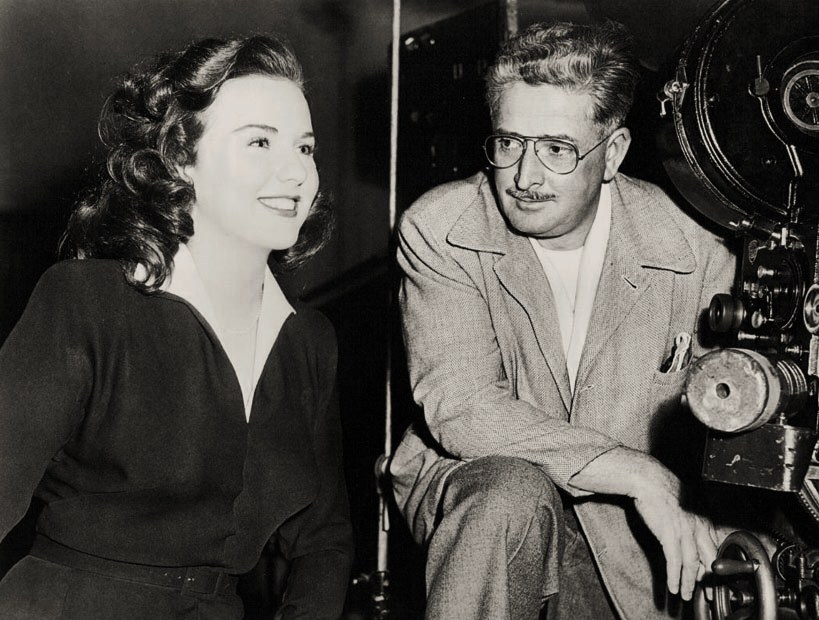
Deanna Durbin and cinematographer William H. Daniels on the set of the film.

- Deanna Durbin as Mary Peppertree
- Edmond O'Brien as Lt. Tom Farrington
- Don Taylor as David Paxton
- Jeffrey Lynn as Phillip Manning
- Ray Collins as Harvey Elwood
- Hugo Haas as Gustav Heindel
- Harry Davenport as Justice Peabody
- Griff Barnett as Timothy Peppertree
- Katharine Alexander as Miss Harkness
- James Todd as Justice Van Sloan
- Morris Ankrum as Adm. Walton
- Frank Conroy as Samuel Litchfield
- Leon Belasco as Igor
- Louise Beavers as Bertha
- Raymond Greenleaf as Justice Williams
- Charles Meredith as Justice Hastings
- Adele Rowland as Mrs. Peabody
- Mary Adams as Marge
- Adrienne Marden as Hilda
- Beatrice Roberts as Dorothy
- Harry Cheshire as Col. Hedley
- Donald Randolph as Asst. Attorney General
- William Gould as Sen. Benning
- M'liss McClure

== Production ==
In October 1941 Joe Pasternak, who produced ten movies with Durbin at Universal, announced he wanted to make Washington Girl at MGM, based on a story by Ruth Finney, about a telephone operator at the White House. Kathryn Grayson and Dan Dailey were to star.

The film was never made. In September 1947 Universal announced Durbin would star as a White House telephone operator in White House Girl based on a story by Karl Turnberg, who adapted Up in Central Park. William Seiter was to direct and Donald O'Connor was to co star.

In January 1948 Universal reported that Mary Loos and Richard Sale were working on the script and the film would be known as Washington Girl. By February O'Connor was no longer on the film, being reassigned to The Wonderful Race of Rim Rock and was replaced by Don Taylor. Karl Turnberg was replaced as producer by Robert Arthur. Jeffrey Lynn and Edmond O'Brien joined the cast in March (O'Brien was withdrawn from the cast of Rogue's Regiment to do the film.

The title was changed to For the Love of Mary which had been the original title of Something in the Wind.

The music was written by Frank Skinner. The songs were conducted by Edgar Fairchild and staged by Nick Castle.

Frederick de Cordova knew Durbin socially and says she approved him as director. He later said "she was comfortable although she was getting to the point where she was uncomfortable making pictures at all."

Filming started 15 March 1948 and finished by May. In August Universal sued Durbin for $87,083 being money they advanced her.

== Reception ==
In his 1948 review for The New York Times, Bosley Crowther called the film "a sly piece of propaganda against the administrators of our government in Washington." Crowther explained:

For no one could possibly have cooked up such a horribly-quaint and coy romance in which not only the President of the United States but four Supreme Court Justices play cupid to a telephone girl without deliberately intending to make those gentlemen appear terrific dopes.

According to Crowther, the filmmakers, whom he called "propagandists", manipulate the viewer into drawing negative conclusions about Washington and its leaders. The film also fails on an entertainment level, with "painful attempts at humor" and "flat jokes" about the "woefully lax and quixotic operations of White House officialdom."

In his review for Allmovie, Craig Butler called it "a moderately entertaining mini-musical simply because of the charming presence of Deanna Durbin." Butler saw the film as an unsuccessful attempt at creating a romantic screwball comedy of the classic type, lacking the necessary keen eye on detail, organization, character, and wit. According to Butler, the screenplay lacks all of these. The main "gimmick", of the President of the United States getting personally involved in straightening out the love life of a switchboard operator, is "obnoxiously cute and simply too unbelievable." Butler does applaud de Cordova's direction and the acting—Harry Davenport is especially good as a Supreme Court justice—but it is not enough to salvage a poor script and unbelievable story. Butler concludes:

But it's Durbin who has to carry the movie, and she does a wonderful job, skipping through the messes of the plot without a care for how silly the whole thing is. And, of course, she sounds wonderful when she sings as well. Pretty much by herself, she makes Mary something really pretty merry.
