= Katie Did It =

1951 film by Frederick de Cordova

- Film poster
- Directed by: Frederick De Cordova
- Written by: Oscar Brodney; Jack Henley
- Produced by: Leonard Goldstein
- Starring: Ann Blyth; Mark Stevens; Cecil Kellaway
- Cinematography: Russell Metty
- Edited by: Frank Gross
- Music by: Frank Skinner
- Production company: Universal International Pictures
- Distributed by: Universal Pictures
- Release dates: October 1950 (England); January 25, 1951 (New York); March 2, 1951 (San Francisco); April 22, 1951 (U.S.); May 26, 1951 (Los Angeles)
- Running time: 81 minutes
- Country: United States
- Language: English

Katie Did It is a 1951 American romantic comedy film directed by Fred de Cordova and starring Ann Blyth, Mark Stevens and Cecil Kellaway. The plot concerns a small-town girl who falls in love with a big-city artist but mistakenly believes that he has a wife and children.

== Cast ==
- Ann Blyth as Katherine Standish
- Mark Stevens as Peter Van Arden
- Cecil Kellaway as Nathaniel B. Wakeley VI
- Jesse White as Jim Dilloway
- Harold Vermilyea as Merill T. Grumby
- Craig Stevens as Stuart Grumby
- William H. Lynn as Clarence Spivvens
- Elizabeth Patterson as Aunt Priscilla Wakely
- Jimmy Hunt as Steven Goodrich
- Irving Bacon as Conductor
- Raymond Largay as Rev. Turner
- Peter Leeds as "Odds" Burton
- Ethyl May Halls as Abigail

== Production ==
The film's working title was Katie Did, presumably a pun on the word katydid.

The film's star Mark Stevens had been a commercial artist before his acting career, and his own artwork is shown in the film. Stevens painted the portrait of Katherine Standish that his character is shown painting, which required Ann Blyth to spend two days in a bathtub. When the crew complained that the bath water was too murky, chlorine was added, but it still appeared dull, so two quarts of champagne were added.

== Release ==
The film was released in England in October 1950, long before its American debut.

== Reception ==
In a contemporary review, the Los Angeles Times wrote: "It is, in fact, a beguilingly amusing tale, this, with some very funny John Gardensass types, especially William Lynn as a drawling Yank and Cecil Kellaway as the uncle. Ann Blyth and Mark Stevens as the principals. and Elizabeth Patterson as the aunt, are delightful.

== Bibliography ==
- Stephens, Michael L. Art Directors in Cinema: A Worldwide Biographical Dictionary. McFarland, 1998.
