= Adam Carroll =

Adam Carroll may refer to:

- Adam Carroll (racing driver) (born 1982), Northern Irish racing driver
- Adam Carroll (American musician) (born 1975), American musician
- Adam Carroll (American pianist) (1897–1974), American composer, pianist and conductor
