= The Big Bonanza =

1944 film

- Directed by: George Archainbaud
- Starring: Jane Frazee; Richard Arlen; Gabby Hayes
- Distributed by: Republic Pictures
- Release date: 1944
- Running time: 70 minutes
- Country: United States
- Language: English

The Big Bonanza is a 1944 American Western film starring Jane Frazee, Richard Arlen, Gabby Hayes, Robert Livingston and Lynne Roberts.

== Plot ==
Escaping from jail after being falsely accused of cowardice, Army captain Jed Kilton ends up at odds with his old friend, Sam Ballou.

Sam has been raising Jed's little brother during the Civil War, but when Jed and sidekick Hap ride into Nevada Springs, they find Sam owns a saloon and has the boy is living there in an unsuitable setting. Jed becomes acquainted with Sam's sweetheart, dancehall gal Chiquita McSweeney, and with a prim and proper school teacher, Judy Parker.

It turns out Sam is a dishonest man who intends to stake an illegal claim to the Big Bonanza gold mine that belongs to someone else. Jed ends up literally fighting him for the mine, where a cave-in results in Sam's death. Hap is happy to learn that Jed and Judy are already busy planning a wedding.

== Cast ==
- Richard Arlen as Capt. Jed Kilton
- Robert Livingston as Sam Ballou
- Lynne Roberts as Judy Parker
- Gabby Hayes as Hap Selby
- Jane Frazee as Chiquita
- Bobby Driscoll as Spud Kilton

== See also ==
- List of films and television shows about the American Civil War
- Bonanza (American Western TV series)
