= I'll Remember April (1945 film) =

1945 film directed by Harold Young

- Theatrical release poster
- Directed by: Harold Young
- Screenplay by: M. Coates Webster
- Story by: Gene Lewis
- Based on: Amateur Night by Bob Dillon
- Produced by: Gene Lewis
- Starring: Gloria Jean; Kirby Grant; Milburn Stone; Edward Brophy; Samuel S. Hinds; Jacqueline deWit; Hobart Cavanaugh
- Cinematography: Jerome Ash
- Edited by: Philip Cahn
- Production company: Universal Pictures
- Distributed by: Universal Pictures
- Release date: April 13, 1945
- Running time: 63 minutes
- Country: United States
- Language: English

I'll Remember April is a 1945 American film directed by Harold Young and written by M. Coates Webster, combining elements of comedy, music, and mystery. The film stars Gloria Jean, and features Kirby Grant, Milburn Stone, Edward Brophy, Samuel S. Hinds, Jacqueline deWit, Morgan Wallace, and Hobart Cavanaugh. The film was released on April 13, 1945, by Universal Pictures. Universal had been producing a series of low-budget musicals named with the titles of popular songs. The song "I'll Remember April", which had debuted in the 1942 Abbott and Costello film Ride 'Em Cowboy, was already becoming a jazz standard by 1945.

== Plot ==
Garrett Garfield is on the board of directors of financier Henry Childs's company. The board is shocked when Childs confesses that he has embezzled six million dollars. Garfield, who has invested all of his money with Childs, suffers a heart attack after threatening to kill Childs. Childs asks the board to reconvene in 30 days, when Childs will reveal whether he can repay the money. Garfield's daughter April graduates from a prestigious private school in Vermont, and is summoned home to New York after her father's collapse.

Rival radio newsmen Dave Ball and Willie Winchester enjoy scooping each other. Dave discovers April in a local café and invites her to sing on his radio show. When Dave loses track of his new discovery, Willie locates her and signs her for his own program.

When Childs is about to disclose the fate of his company, Dave hides a microphone in the boardroom and broadcasts Childs's announcement. A shot rings out, Childs is murdered on the air, and Garfield becomes the prime suspect.

Dave is convinced of Garfield's innocence and turns to Willie for help. Together they investigate the circumstances surrounding Childs's death, and re-enact the crime on a live, network-radio broadcast. They identify the killer, clearing Garfield. Willie gets the scoop, and Dave gets April.

== Cast ==
- Gloria Jean as April Garfield
- Kirby Grant as Dave Ball
- Milburn Stone as Willie Winchester
- Edward Brophy as Shadow
- Samuel S. Hinds as Garrett Garfield
- Jacqueline deWit as Whisper
- Morgan Wallace as Henry Childs
- Hobart Cavanaugh as Joe Billings
- Addison Richards as Inspector Pat Malloy
- Pierre Watkin as Dr. Armitage
- Walter Tetley as Messenger
- Clyde Fillmore as J.C. Cartwright
- Mary Forbes as Mrs. Barrington
- Paul Porcasi as Popolopolis

== Production ==
The film's working title was Mike Goes to a Party, the name of Dave's radio show. I'll Remember April was released, appropriately enough, in April -- one day before Gloria Jean's 19th birthday, in 1945.

Gloria Jean had already left Universal's employ by the time I'll Remember April was released. Her manager, Eddie Sherman, advised her to leave the studio at the end of 1944 and embark on a series of personal appearances:

He said, "You'll die on the vine at Universal. They're only going to let you go, anyway." I could see that it was happening, people I knew were let go, and I felt the same thing was going to happen to me. Even though I didn't want to do it. I didn't want to do it.

== Reception ==
Gloria Jean had been Universal's adolescent singing star since 1939, and critics were pleased by her first adult lead. Elizabeth A. Cunningham in Motion Picture Herald: "Gloria Jean is quite a young lady now, as her latest film will attest, and the young, sweet voice which first brought her featured roles is still her most charming asset. In I'll Remember April her songs cover a pleasing range of styles and rhythms, and the role of an ingenuous youngster is well within her abilities."Boxoffice: "Next to the last of Universal's features toplining Gloria Jean, who is no longer on the studio's contract list, this is a pleasant parcel of supporting entertainment which materially can add to the enjoyment of any program." Showmen's Trade Review: "This latest [Gloria Jean] effort fares somewhat better than its predecessors, for it winds up with an interest-holding mystery. There's the unusual role for Gloria: that of a would-be singer whose glorious voice wins her the plaudits of the nation, and that's evidently as it should be, for it is this type of role that built up her large fan following." Charles Ryweck of Motion Picture Daily: "I'll Remember April is a bright little comedy with music that recklessly detours in the direction of a murder. This one can be summed up as good, light escapist fare, aided by a tuneful score. Cast is uniformly excellent. Miss Jean, in one of her last chores for Universal, is pleasing vocally, in a demure way." Film Daily: "Human interest-packed drama with music should go over with family audiences."
