= Wild Beauty (1946 film) =

1946 film

- Theatrical release poster
- Directed by: Wallace Fox
- Screenplay by: Adele Buffington
- Produced by: Wallace Fox
- Starring: Don Porter; Lois Collier; Jacqueline deWit; Robert Wilcox; George Cleveland; Dick Curtis; Robert 'Buzz' Henry
- Cinematography: Maury Gertsman
- Edited by: Patrick Kelly
- Production company: Universal Pictures
- Distributed by: Universal Pictures
- Release date: August 9, 1946
- Running time: 61 minutes
- Country: United States
- Language: English

Wild Beauty is a 1946 American action film directed by Wallace Fox and written by Adele Buffington. The film stars Don Porter, Lois Collier, Jacqueline deWit, Robert Wilcox, George Cleveland, Dick Curtis and Robert 'Buzz' Henry. The film was released on August 9, 1946, by Universal Pictures.

== Plot ==
A pretty school teacher (Lois Collier)---make that a very pretty school teacher---, a doctor (Don Porter) who disapproves of the white man's attitude toward Indians, and a young Indian boy (Buzz Henry) do what they can in the modern west to keep Robert Wilcox and his henchies (the usual Universal suspects headed by Dick Curtis) from capturing and killing a wild horse herd so Wilcox can sell the hides. It all looks bigger than it is because director Wallace Fox makes liberal use via stock footage of the massive wild horse herds from Universal's 1936.

== Cast ==
- Don Porter as Dr. Dave Morrow
- Lois Collier as Linda Gibson
- Jacqueline deWit as Cissy Cruthers
- Robert Wilcox as Gordon Madison
- George Cleveland as Barney Skeets
- Dick Curtis as John Andrews
- Robert 'Buzz' Henry as Johnny
- Wild Beauty the Horse as Wild Beauty
