= The Sword of Ali Baba =

1965 film by Virgil W. Vogel

- Theatrical release poster
- Directed by: Virgil W. Vogel
- Screenplay by: Edmund Hartmann; Oscar Brodney
- Story by: Edmund Hartmann
- Produced by: Howard Christie
- Starring: Peter Mann; Jocelyn Lane; Frank McGrath; Peter Whitney
- Cinematography: William Margulies
- Edited by: Gene Palmer
- Music by: Frank Skinner
- Production company: Universal Pictures
- Distributed by: Universal Pictures
- Release date: April 1965
- Running time: 81 minutes
- Country: United States
- Language: English

The Sword of Ali Baba is a 1965 American adventure film from Universal Pictures, directed by Virgil W. Vogel and written by Edmund Hartmann and Oscar Brodney. The film stars Peter Mann, Jocelyn Lane, Frank McGrath, Gavin MacLeod, Frank Puglia, and Peter Whitney and is a remake of the 1944 film Ali Baba and the Forty Thives, which was derived from The Book of One Thousand and One Nights and the tale of the same name.

== Plot ==
In the immediate aftermath of the successful Mongolian conquest of Bagdad by Hulagu Khan, the caliph Hassan escapes captivity, together with his young son Ali, while he prepares to regroup the remnants of his troops. While staying at the mansion of Prince Cassim, Ali and Cassim's daughter Amara, fearing that they will not see each other again, betroth themselves via a blood-bond.

As the caliph prepares to leave, Cassim stops him at the last moment. This, however, is the initiation for an ambush by the Mongols, to whom the cowardly prince has sworn allegiance; the caliph and his retinue are massacred, and only Ali escapes. Alone and lost in the desert, he comes across a mountainside where he sees a group of riders exiting a hidden cave. Using their opening phrase, he enters the cave and finds it filled with treasure. When the 40 thieves return, they find the boy asleep. Upon learning that he is the son of the caliph, and impressed by his courage and determination, the thieves allow him to stay, and their leader, Old Baba, adopts him as his son, Ali Baba.

Ten years later, the band of thieves have become a group of Robin Hood-style resistance fighters, raiding the Mongols and giving to their poor and downtrodden people. They learn of a caravan bearing the new bride for the Khan to Bagdad, which seems to be rich pickings because it appears only loosely guarded. Ali Baba, however, now a grown man, is suspicious and decides to first scout the caravan, along with his 'nanny' Abdullah. The bride turns out to be Amara, Cassim's daughter, who is to be wed to the Khan in order to solidify Cassim's shaky standing with the Mongols.

Amara decides to take a bath in the oasis, where Ali encounters her (they do not recognize each other). Taking her for a servant girl and passing himself off as a traveler, he asks her about the caravan, then more about herself. It turns out that the caravan is heavily guarded; Ali is ambushed and captured, while Abdullah narrowly escapes. Upon learning that the "servant girl" is the bride of the Khan (her name is not mentioned), Ali curses her for her supposed treachery. Hurt by his words and in growing admiration for him and his cause, she asks her servant and bodyguard, Jamiel, who hero-worships the 40 thieves, to give Ali water for the trip.

In Bagdad, Ali is presented to the Khan, though he is not recognized as the leader of the 40 Thieves, and bound in the palace square for public execution the next day. Cassim visits him in private and discovers Ali's real identity, but keeps the knowledge to himself. Soon afterwards, the thieves mount a rescue, but Old Baba is mortally wounded; Amara, who went to see Ali to clear up the misunderstanding between them, is kidnapped, and Jamiel personally cuts Ali loose from his bonds. The thieves retreat inside their mountain.

The next day, the thieves capture Jamiel, who was tracking them. Ali recognizes him, and Jamiel, who swears allegiance to Ali Baba, is assigned to be a spy in the palace. His first task is to deliver a ransom note to the Khan: in exchange for his bride, Hulagu Khan is to surrender the traitor Cassim. The thieves proceed to Cassim's mansion to await the traitor's arrival. When Amara enters the garden, Ali recognizes her as his lost love, and with his re-awakened feelings he decides to release her without waiting for her father. This initially arouses the anger of his thieves, but they still remain loyal to Ali.

When Amara returns to Bagdad, her father confesses Ali's true identity to her and the Khan. Hulagu Khan decides to hold the wedding immediately; Amara refuses, but the sight of her father being tortured forces her to give in. Jamiel brings the news to Ali, who decides to free her. In order to reach the palace unnoticed, he devises a plan to pose as a merchant from Basra who brings huge jars of oil as a wedding gift. Jamiel returns to the palace to relay the plan to Amara, but he sees one of her servants eavesdropping, and she relays the news to Cassim and the Khan. They decide to provide a surprise "welcome" for Ali.

On the wedding day, Ali arrives playing the merchant and is admitted as a guest. During an interlude, sword dancers appear, who perform and suddenly plunge their weapons through the jar covers. But the jars contain only sand. After discovering the exposure of the original plan, Ali decided to make a few changes: Most of his men came disguised in the crowd; others were hidden in jars not brought before the Khan.

Hulagu Khan kills Cassim for his failure and announces Ali's execution, but Jamiel opens the revolt by quickly dispatching the guards holding Ali with his throwing knives. While Ali's men attack the palace guards, he and Amara open the gates to the gathering mob, which storms in and overpowers the Mongols. Hulagu Khan is killed by Abdullah as he tries to finish off Ali. As a sign of their victory, Jamiel hoists the Arabian flag atop the palace's highest tower.

== Cast ==
- Peter Mann as Ali Baba
- Jocelyn Lane as Princess Amara
- Frank McGrath as Pindar
- Gavin MacLeod as Hulagu Khan
- Frank Puglia as Cassim
- Peter Whitney as Abou
- Greg Morris as Yusef
- Frank DeKova as Old Baba
- Irene Tsu as Nalu
