= Frenchie (film) =

1950 film by Louis King

- Theatrical release poster
- Directed by: Louis King
- Written by: Oscar Brodney
- Produced by: Michael Kraike
- Starring: Joel McCrea; Shelley Winters
- Cinematography: Maury Gertsman
- Edited by: Ted J. Kent
- Music by: Hans J. Salter
- Color process: Technicolor
- Production company: Universal Pictures
- Distributed by: Universal Pictures
- Release date: December 25, 1950 (Los Angeles)
- Running time: 81 minutes
- Country: United States
- Language: English
- Box office: $1,450,000 (US rentals)

Frenchie is a 1950 American Western film directed by Louis King and starring Joel McCrea and Shelley Winters. The plot is loosely based on the 1939 Western Destry Rides Again.

== Plot ==
Frank Dawson is killed in the town of Bottleneck by his double-crossing partner Pete Lambert, leaving a young girl without a father. For the next 15 years, she lives in orphanages and works for the Fontaines, originally from Paris, earning her the nickname of Frenchie. Now grown, she makes a fortune running a casino in New Orleans, then returns to Bottleneck to finally try to find her father's killer. She buys the Scarlet Angel casino but learns that sheriff Tom Banning has brought order to the town, forcing gamblers to nearby Chuckaluck, where the man in charge is Lambert.

Frenchie finds Lance Cole, a man who had helped her in New Orleans, and asks him to come to Bottleneck to run the Scarlet Angel with her. Lambert's gambling interests are threatened, so he plans to ambush Cole's stage. Banning intervenes and prevents bloodshed. Cole is in love with Frenchie and is suspicious Banning may be in love with her as well. Diane, Banning's former fiancée, is also jealous. To exact revenge, she marries rich banker Clyde Gorman for his money and then incites the Bottleneck townspeople to expel Frenchie and her crew. When Banning sees Frenchie visiting her father's grave, he guesses she is Dawson's daughter. He rides to Chuckaluck to prevent trouble, but Lambert tries to shoot him.

The men of Bottleneck who want to repel Frenchie head for the hills when she lies to them about a gold discovery there. Diane declares her love to Banning, who rejects her. Diane visits the Scarlet Angel to confront Frenchie and divulges that her husband is Lambert's silent partner and is working against her. The women fight, but Tom separates them.

Frenchie now knows the identities of the two men who murdered her father. When she decides against vengeance, Cole figures that she will not kill Gorman because that would make Diane a widow and free to be with Tom. An unknown figure shoots Gorman in the back. Banning is accused and locked in his own jail. Frenchie organizes a jailbreak, but Tom is suspicious because he thinks that Frenchie could be orchestrating a setup that will end in his death at the hands of a posse.

Thinking that Tom is out of the way, Lambert and his men ride to Bottleneck to take Frenchie's casino by force. Tom is inside and tells Lambert that he is there to negotiate the sale of the casino. Lambert goes inside, and Tom tells him that he is arresting him for the murder of Frank Dawson. Lambert draws his gun and Tom kills him in self-defense. When things look bleak for him, Diane confesses that it was she who killed her husband. Tom assumes that Frenchie will leave town now, but Frenchie goes into a cell, closes the door and discards the key, letting Tom know that she does not intend to go anywhere.

== Cast ==
- Joel McCrea as Tom Banning
- Shelley Winters as Frenchie
- Paul Kelly as Pete Lambert
- Elsa Lanchester as the Countess
- Marie Windsor as Diane Gorman
- John Russell as Lance Cole
- John Emery as the Banker, Clyde Gorman
- George Cleveland as Jefferson Harding
- Regis Toomey as Carter
- Frank Ferguson as Jim Dobbs
- Lawrence Dobkin as Joe the Bartender
- Chubby Johnson as miner
- Jerry Paris as Perry
