= Yes Sir, That's My Baby (film) =

1949 film by George Sherman

- Theatrical release poster
- Directed by: George Sherman
- Written by: Oscar Brodney
- Produced by: Leonard Goldstein
- Cinematography: Irving Glassberg
- Edited by: Ted J. Kent
- Music by: Walter Scharf
- Color process: Technicolor
- Production company: Universal International Pictures
- Distributed by: Universal Pictures
- Release dates: August 10, 1949 (Chicago, Illinois); September 14, 1949 (Los Angeles)
- Running time: 82 minutes
- Country: United States
- Language: English
- Budget: $620,000-$850,000 (est).
- Box office: $1.5 million

Yes Sir, That's My Baby is a 1949 American musical comedy film directed by George Sherman and starring Donald O'Connor and Gloria DeHaven.

The film is noted for O'Connor's dance "They Haven't Figured Out a Woman" that he does at the Laundromat. O'Connor and DeHaven had been friends as children and this was the first of two films they were in together, the other being Out to Sea nearly 50 years later.

It was known as And Baby Makes Three.

== Plot ==
After the war, Granger College has a lot of students who are parents of children. Among them are Bill and Sarah Jane Winfield, who have a baby they've nicknamed Boopkins.

Bill is a football player for Granger, but a tired Sarah Jane, who's also a student, resents that Bill neglects his household duties, leaving the child-raising to her. She demands that he quit the football team. Soon other wives of players begin doing likewise, leading the team's coach, Professor Hartley, to call them henpecked, while Professor Boland takes the women's side, resulting in a campus feud.

Granger begins losing football games because Bill's replacement, Arnold Schultze, is not as good a player. The feud escalates between the professors, who were once romantically involved but have since been engaged in a long-running feud. Bill and Sarah Jane try to get them back together.

When he learns that the coach is going to lose his job due to Granger's failures on the field, Bill declares that he is returning to the team for the season's final game. Complications involving the baby distract him in mid-game, but with Boland's help, he returns just in time to score the game-winning touchdown and send everyone home happy.

== Cast ==
- Donald O'Connor as William Waldo Winfield
- Charles Coburn as Professor Hartley
- Gloria DeHaven as Sarah Jane Winfield
- Joshua Shelley as Arnold Schultze
- Barbara Brown as Professor Boland
- Jim Davis as Joe Tascarelli
- James Brown as Tony Cresnovitch
- Hal Baylor as Pudge Flugeldorfer (credited as Hal Fieberling)
- Jack Lambert as Leslie Schulze
- Michael Dugan as Eddie Koslowski
