= Walking My Baby Back Home (film) =

1953 film

- Directed by: Lloyd Bacon
- Written by: Oscar Brodney; Don McGuire; Lenny Bruce
- Produced by: Ted Richmond; Leonard Goldstein
- Starring: Donald O'Connor; Janet Leigh; Buddy Hackett
- Cinematography: Irving Glassberg
- Edited by: Ted J. Kent
- Music by: Henry Mancini (uncredited)
- Production company: Universal Pictures
- Distributed by: Universal Pictures
- Release date: December 6, 1953
- Running time: 95 minutes
- Country: United States
- Language: English
- Box office: $1.8 million

Walking My Baby Back Home is a 1953 American musical comedy film directed by Lloyd Bacon and starring Donald O'Connor, Janet Leigh, and Buddy Hackett. It was Hackett's film debut and the screenplay of the movie included a contribution by the notorious and controversial comedian Lenny Bruce.

Excerpts of the film are used in the 1975 Columbo episode "Forgotten Lady", in which Leigh plays a middle aged former film star, Grace Wheeler, who nostalgically watches the film; Walking My Baby Back Home music composer Henry Mancini was the composer of the Columbo theme music as well.

Donald O'Connor enjoyed working with Janet Leigh.

She hadn't danced in years but was a real trouper. Nine times out of 10 we'd do all those beautiful dance routines on cement, and she got very tired, started falling a lot on her knees. And her knees started to swell three times their normal size. It was very painful. On the screen you can't tell how she was suffering in that darn thing.

== Plot ==
A World War II veteran joins a minstrel show and falls in love with the daughter of the troupe's patriarch.

== Cast ==
- Donald O'Connor as Clarence "Jigger" Miller
- Janet Leigh as Chris Hall
- Buddy Hackett as Blimp Edwards
- Lori Nelson as Claire Millard
- Scatman Crothers as "Smiley" Gordon
- Kathleen Lockhart as Mrs. Millard
- George Cleveland as Col. Dan Wallace
- John Hubbard as Rodney Millard
- Norman Abbott as Doc
- Phil Garris as Hank
- Walter Kingsford as Uncle Henry Hall
- Sidney Miller as Walter Thomas
- The Modernaires as themselves
- The Sportsmen Quartet as themselves (credited as The Sportsmen)
