= Leo Robin =

American songwriter (1895–1984)

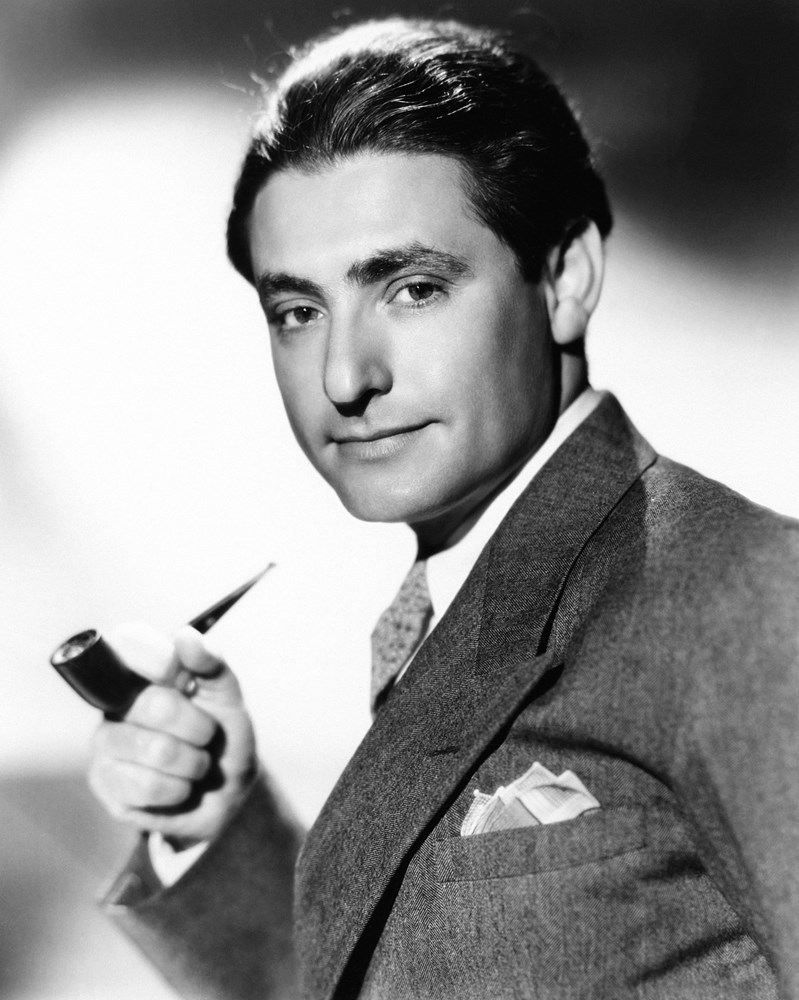
- Robin in 1934

Background information
- Born: April 6, 1895; Pittsburgh, Pennsylvania, U.S.
- Died: December 29, 1984 (aged 89) Woodland Hills, California, U.S.
- Occupations: Composer, lyricist, songwriter

Leo Robin (April 6, 1895 – December 29, 1984) was an American composer, lyricist and songwriter. He is probably best known for collaborating with Ralph Rainger on the 1938 Oscar-winning song "Thanks for the Memory," sung by Bob Hope and Shirley Ross in the film The Big Broadcast of 1938, and with Jule Styne on "Diamonds Are a Girl's Best Friend".

== Biography ==
Robin was born in Pittsburgh, Pennsylvania, United States. His father was Max Robin, a salesman. Leo's mother was Fannie Finkelpearl Robin. He studied at the University of Pittsburgh School of Law and at Carnegie Tech's drama school. He later worked as a reporter and as a publicist.

Robin's first hits came in 1926 with the Broadway production By the Way, with hits in several other musicals immediately following, such as Bubbling Over (1926), Hit the Deck, Judy (1927), and Hello Yourself (1928). In 1932, Robin went out to Hollywood to work for Paramount Pictures. His principal collaborator was composer Ralph Rainger, together they became one of the leading film songwriting duos of the 1930s and early 1940s, writing over 50 hits. Robin and Rainger worked together until Rainger's death in a plane crash on October 23, 1942. Robin continued to collaborate with many other composers over the years, including Harold Arlen, Vincent Youmans, Sam Coslow, Richard A. Whiting, Jule Styne, Harry Warren and Nacio Herb Brown. Leo Robin collaborated with Rainger on the 1938 Oscar-winning song "Thanks for the Memory," sung by Bob Hope in the film The Big Broadcast of 1938, which was to become Hope's signature tune. Robin and Styne wrote the 1949 score for Gentlemen Prefer Blondes, including "Diamonds Are a Girl's Best Friend", a signature song for Carol Channing and later Marilyn Monroe.

Robin collaborated on the score for the 1955 musical film My Sister Eileen with Styne, then officially retired from the movie industry. He is a member of the Songwriters Hall of Fame, having been inducted in 1972. Robin wrote many popular songs, mostly for film and television, including "Louise," "Beyond the Blue Horizon" (both songs co-written by Richard A. Whiting), "Prisoner of Love" and "Blue Hawaii".

== Death ==
Robin died of heart failure in Woodland Hills, California at the age of 89, and was interred in the Hillside Memorial Park Cemetery in Culver City, California.

== Work on Broadway ==
- Hit the Deck (1927), musical - co-lyricist
- Allez-oop (1927), revue - lyricist
- Just Fancy (1927), musical - lyricist
- Hello Yourself (1928), musical - lyricist
- Tattle Tales (1933), revue - contributing lyricist
- Gentlemen Prefer Blondes (1949), musical - lyricist
- The Girl in Pink Tights (1954), musical - lyricist
- Lorelei - Gentlemen Still Prefer Blondes (1974), musical - lyricist

Posthumous credits or shows in which pre-written songs by Leo Robin were featured include:

- Maurice Chevalier in an evening of Songs and Impressions (1955), concert
- The American Dance Machine (1978), dance special
- A Day in Hollywood / A Night in the Ukraine (1980), revue - lyricist for "Louise", "Beyond the Blue Horizon", "Double Trouble", and "Thanks for the Memory"
- Big Deal (1986), musical - lyricist for "Love Is Just around the Corner"
- Gentlemen Prefer Blondes (1995 revival)
- Fosse (1999), revue - lyricist for "Got No Room for Mr. Gloom"

== See also ==
- Uncle Sam Gets Around, 1941 song
