= Bobby Driscoll =

American actor (1937–1968)

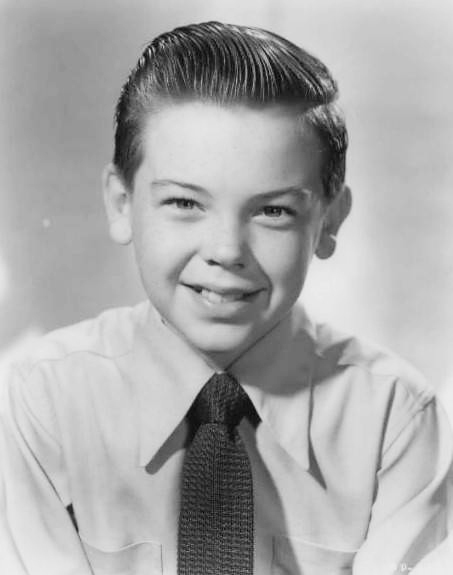
- Driscoll in 1948
- Born: Robert Cletus Driscoll; March 3, 1937; Cedar Rapids, Iowa, U.S.
- Died: c. March 30, 1968 (aged 31); New York City, U.S.
- Resting place: Potter's Field, Hart Island, New York
- Occupation: Actor
- Years active: 1943–1965
- Known for: Original voice of Walt Disney's Peter Pan
- Notable work: Song of the South (1946); So Dear to My Heart (1948); Treasure Island (1950); Peter Pan (1953)
- Spouse: Marilyn Jean Rush (m. 1956; div. 1960)
- Children: 3
- Awards: Academy Juvenile Award; 1950 So Dear to My Heart; The Window; Milky Way Gold Star Award; 1954 for his TV and Radio work Hollywood Walk Of Fame; 1560 Vine Street

Robert Cletus Driscoll (March 3, 1937 – c. March 30, 1968) was an American actor who performed on film and television. He starred in some of the Walt Disney Studios' best-known live-action pictures of that period: Song of the South (1946), So Dear to My Heart (1948), and Treasure Island (1950), as well as RKO's The Window (1949). He served as the animation model and provided the voice for the title role in Peter Pan (1953). He received an Academy Juvenile Award for outstanding performances in So Dear to My Heart and The Window.

In the mid-1950s, Driscoll's acting career began to decline, and he turned primarily to guest appearances on anthology TV series. He became addicted to narcotics, and was sentenced to prison for illicit drug use. After his release, he focused his attention on the avant-garde art scene. With his funds depleted, his initially unidentified body was discovered on March 30, 1968, in an abandoned building in the East Village of Manhattan.

== Early life ==
Driscoll was born in Cedar Rapids, Iowa, the only child of Cletus Driscoll (1902–1970), an insulation salesman, and Isabelle (née Kratz; 1904–1982), a former schoolteacher. Shortly after his birth, the family moved to Des Moines, where they stayed until early 1943. The family moved to Los Angeles when a doctor advised Cletus to relocate to California because he was suffering from work-related handling of asbestos.

Driscoll's parents were encouraged to help their son become a child performer in films. Their barber's son, an actor, got Bobby an audition at MGM for a role in the family drama Lost Angel (1943), which starred Margaret O'Brien. While on a tour across the studio lot, five-year-old Driscoll noticed a mock-up ship and asked where the water was. The director was impressed by the boy's curiosity and intelligence and chose him over 40 applicants.

== Career ==
=== "Wonder Child" ===
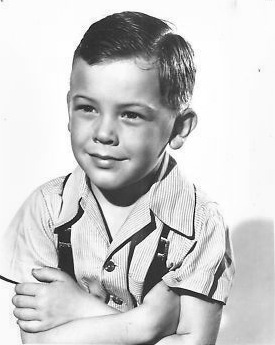
Driscoll in The Fighting Sullivans (1944), his debut film

Driscoll's brief, two-minute debut helped him win the role of young Al Sullivan, the youngest of the five Sullivan brothers, in the 20th Century Fox World War II drama The Fighting Sullivans (1944) with Thomas Mitchell and Anne Baxter. Additional screen portrayals included the boy who could blow his whistle while standing on his head in Sunday Dinner for a Soldier, the "child brother" of Richard Arlen in The Big Bonanza (both 1944), and young Percy Maxim in So Goes My Love (1946), with Don Ameche and Myrna Loy. He also had smaller roles in movies such as Identity Unknown (1945) and Miss Susie Slagle's, From This Day Forward, and O.S.S. with Alan Ladd (all 1946).

=== Disney ===
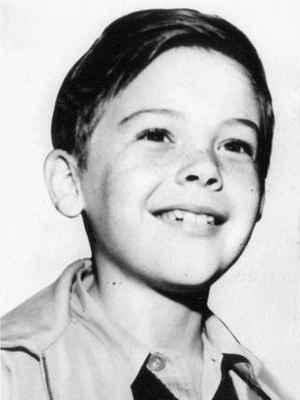
Driscoll in February 1946

Driscoll and Luana Patten were the first two actors Walt Disney placed under contract. Driscoll then played the lead character in Song of the South (1946), which introduced live action into the producer's films in conjunction with extensive animated footage. The film turned Driscoll and his co-star Luana Patten into child stars, and they were discussed for a special Academy Award as the best child actors of the year, but for the year of its release, no juvenile awards were presented at all.

Now nicknamed by the American press as Walt Disney's "Sweetheart Team", Driscoll and Patten starred together in So Dear to My Heart (1948) with Burl Ives and Beulah Bondi. It was planned as Disney's first all-live-action movie, with production beginning immediately after Song of the South, but its release was delayed until late 1948 to meet the demands of Disney's co-producer and longtime distributor RKO Radio Pictures for animated content in the film.

Driscoll played Eddie Cantor's screen son in the RKO Studios musical comedy If You Knew Susie (also 1948), in which he teamed with former Our Gang member Margaret Kerry. Patten and he appeared with Roy Rogers and the Sons of the Pioneers in the live-action teaser for the Pecos Bill segment of Disney's cartoon compilation Melody Time (also 1948).

Donald O'Connor presenting Bobby Driscoll his Oscar
22nd Academy Award Ceremony of March 23, 1950 – excerpt

Driscoll was lent to RKO to star in The Window, based on Cornell Woolrich's short story "The Boy Cried Murder". Howard Hughes, who had bought RKO the previous year, considered the film unworthy of release and Driscoll not much of an actor, so delayed its release. When it was released in May 1949, it became a surprise hit. The New York Times credited Driscoll with the film's success:

The mounting terror of a young boy who lives in mortal fear of his life is projected with remarkable verisimilitude by 12-year-old Bobby Driscoll in "The Window," which opened on Saturday at the Victoria. The striking force and terrifying impact of this RKO melodrama is chiefly due to Bobby's brilliant acting, for the whole effect would have been lost were there any suspicion of doubt about the credibility of this pivotal character. Occasionally, the director overdoes things a bit in striving for shock effects...But "The Window" is Bobby Driscoll's picture, make no mistake about that.

So Dear to My Heart and The Window earned Driscoll a special Juvenile Academy Award in March 1950 as the outstanding juvenile actor of 1949.

Driscoll was cast to play Jim Hawkins in Walt Disney's version of Robert Louis Stevenson's Treasure Island (1950), with British actor Robert Newton as Long John Silver, the studio's first all-live-action picture. The feature was filmed in the United Kingdom, and during production, Driscoll was found to not have a valid British work permit, so his family and Disney were fined and ordered to leave the country. They were allowed to remain for six weeks to prepare an appeal, and director Byron Haskin hastily shot all of Driscoll's close-ups, using his British stand-in to film missing location scenes after his parents and he had returned to California.

Treasure Island was an international hit, and several other film projects involving Driscoll were under discussion, but none materialized. For example, Haskin recalled in his memoirs that Disney, although interested in Robert Louis Stevenson's pirate story as a full-length cartoon, always planned to cast Driscoll as Mark Twain's Tom Sawyer. He was at the perfect age for the role, but because of a story rights ownership dispute with Hollywood producer David O. Selznick, who had previously produced the property in 1938, Disney ultimately had to cancel the entire project. Driscoll also was scheduled to portray a youthful follower of Robin Hood following Treasure Island, again with Robert Newton, who would play Friar Tuck, but Driscoll's run-in with British immigration made this impossible.

Driscoll's second long-run Disney contract allowed him to be lent to independent Horizon Pictures for the double role of Danny/Josh Reed in When I Grow Up (1951). His casting was suggested by screenwriter Michael Kanin.

In addition to his brief guest appearance in Walt Disney's first television Christmas show in 1950, One Hour in Wonderland, Driscoll lent his voice to Goofy, Jr. in the Disney cartoon shorts "Fathers Are People" and "Father's Lion", which were released in 1951 and 1952, respectively.

Driscoll portrayed Robert "Bibi" Bonnard in Richard Fleischer's comedy The Happy Time (1952), which was based on a Broadway play of the same name by Samuel A. Taylor. Cast with Charles Boyer, Marsha Hunt, Louis Jourdan, and Kurt Kasznar, he played the juvenile offspring of a patriarch in Quebec of the 1920s, the character upon whom the plot centered.

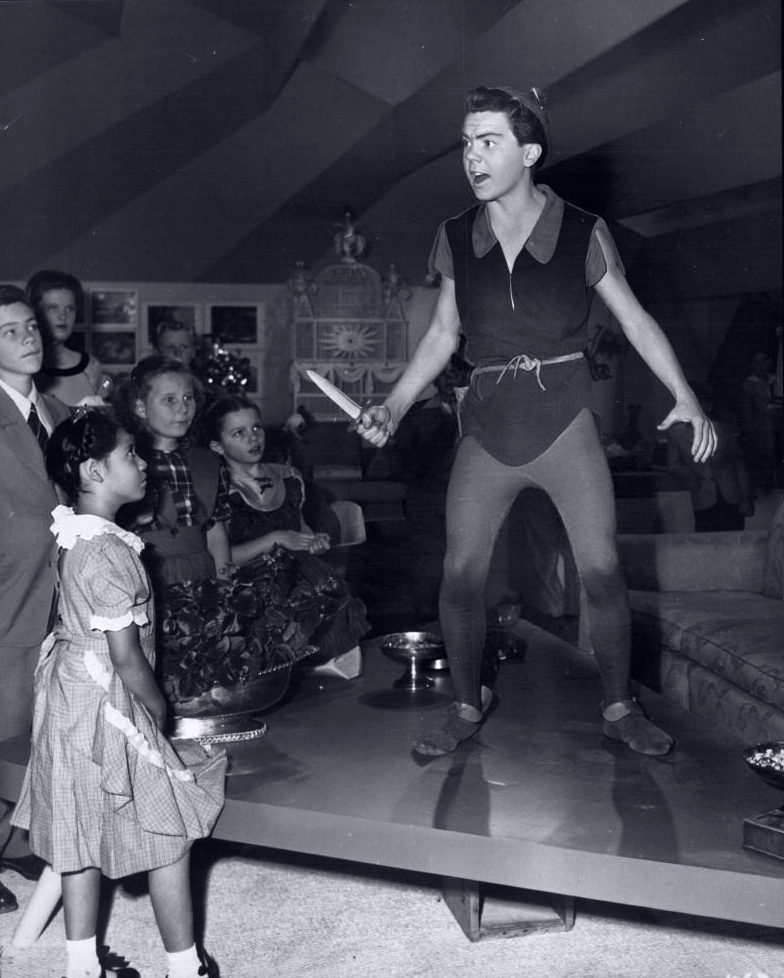
Driscoll as Peter Pan in The Walt Disney Christmas Show

Driscoll's last major success, Peter Pan (1953), was produced largely between May 1949 and mid-1951. Driscoll was cast with Disney's "Little British Lady" Kathryn Beaumont, who was in the role of Wendy Darling; he was used as the reference model for the close-ups and provided Peter Pan's voice, and dancer and choreographer Roland Dupree was the model for the character's motion. Scenes were played on an almost empty sound stage, with only the most essential props, and filmed for use by the animators.

In his biography of Disney, Marc Elliot described Driscoll as the producer's favorite "live action" child star: "Walt often referred to Driscoll with great affection as the living embodiment of his own youth." During a project meeting following the completion of Peter Pan, though, Disney stated that he now saw Driscoll as best suited for roles as a young bully rather than a likable protagonist. Driscoll's salary at Disney had been raised to $1,750 per week, but Driscoll had little work from 1952 on. In March 1953, Driscoll's additional two-year option had been extended (which would have kept him at Disney into 1956) but was cancelled just weeks after Peter Pan was released theatrically. A severe case of acne accompanying the onset of puberty, explaining why it was necessary for Driscoll to use heavy makeup for his performances on dozens of TV shows, was officially provided as the final reason for the termination of his connection with the Disney Studios.

=== Radio and television ===
Driscoll encountered increasing indifference from the other Hollywood studios. Still perceived as "Disney's kid actor", he was unable to get movie roles as a serious character actor. Beginning in 1953 and for most of the next three years, the bulk of his work was on television, on such anthology and drama series as Fireside Theater, Schlitz Playhouse of Stars, Front Row Center, Navy Log, TV Reader's Digest, Climax!, Ford Theatre, Studio One, Dragnet, Medic, and Dick Powell's Zane Grey Theatre. On another series, Men of Annapolis, he appeared with John Smith, future second husband of Driscoll's Song of the South co-star, Luana Patten.

In some special star-focusing series, Driscoll appeared with Loretta Young, Gloria Swanson, and Jane Wyman.

Between 1948 and 1957, he performed on a number of radio productions, which included a special broadcast version of Treasure Island in January 1951 and of Peter Pan in December 1953. As was common practice in this business, Driscoll and Luana Patten also did promotional radio gigs (starting in late 1946 for Song of the South) and toured the country for various parades and charity events through the years.

In 1947, he recorded a special version of "So Dear to My Heart" at Capitol Records. In 1954, he was awarded a Milky Way Gold Star Award, chosen in a nationwide poll for his work on television and radio.

=== Post-Disney ===
After Driscoll left the Disney studios, his parents withdrew him from the Hollywood Professional School, which served child movie actors, and sent him to the public West Los Angeles University High School, instead. There, his grades dropped substantially, he was the target of ridicule for his previous film career, and he began to take drugs. He said later, “I tried desperately to be one of the gang. When they rejected me, I fought back, became belligerent and cocky—and was afraid all the time." At his request, Driscoll's parents returned him the next year to Hollywood Professional School, where in May 1955 he graduated.

His drug use increased; in an interview years later, he stated, "I was 17 when I first experimented with the stuff. In no time I was using whatever was available... mostly heroin, because I had the money to pay for it." In 1956, he was arrested for the first time for possession of marijuana, but the charge was dismissed. On July 24, 1956, Hedda Hopper wrote in the Los Angeles Times: "This could cost this fine lad and good actor his career." In 1957, he had only two television parts, as the loyal brother of a criminal immigrant in M Squad, a long-running crime series starring Lee Marvin, and as an officer aboard the submarine S-38 in an episode of the World War II docudrama series The Silent Service.

In December 1956, Driscoll and his girlfriend, Marilyn Jean Rush, despite only meeting that July, eloped to Mexico to marry despite their parents' objections. The marriage was annulled and the couple later wed again in a ceremony that took place in Los Angeles in March 1957. They had two daughters and one son, but the relationship did not last. They separated, then divorced in 1960.

=== Later roles ===
Driscoll began using the name "Robert Driscoll" to distance himself from his youthful roles as "Bobby" (since 1951, he had been known to friends and family as "Bob", and in Schlitz Playhouse of Stars – Early Space Conquerors, 1952, was credited as "Bob Driscoll"). He landed two final screen roles: with Cornel Wilde in The Scarlet Coat (1955) and opposite Mark Damon, Connie Stevens, and Frances Farmer in The Party Crashers (1958).

He was charged with disturbing the peace and assault with a deadly weapon after two hecklers made insulting remarks while he was washing a girlfriend's car and he hit one with a pistol, but the charges were dropped.

His last known appearances on TV were small roles in two single-season series: The Best of the Post, a syndicated anthology series adapted from stories published in The Saturday Evening Post magazine, and The Brothers Brannagan, an unsuccessful crime series starring Stephen Dunne and Mark Roberts. Both were originally aired on November 5, 1960.

Late in 1961, he was sentenced as a drug addict and imprisoned at the Narcotic Rehabilitation Center of the California Institution for Men in Chino, California. When Driscoll left Chino in early 1962, he was unable to find acting work. Embittered by this, he said, "I have found that memories are not very useful. I was carried on a silver platter—and then dumped into the garbage."

=== New York City ===
In 1965, a year after his parole expired, he relocated to New York, hoping to revive his career on the Broadway stage, but was unsuccessful. He had previously been encouraged to do so by artist and poet Wallace Berman, whom he had befriended after joining Berman's art circle (now also known as Semina Culture) in Los Angeles in 1956. Some of his works were considered outstanding, and a few of his surviving collages and cardboard mailers were temporarily exhibited in Los Angeles at the Santa Monica Museum of Art.

He became part of the New York underground film scene and frequented Pop artist Andy Warhol's studio, the Factory, where he began focusing on his artistic talents. In 1965, Driscoll gave his last known film performance, in experimental filmmaker Piero Heliczer's Dirt.

== Death and aftermath ==
On March 30, 1968, two boys playing in a deserted East Village tenement at 371 East 10th Street found Driscoll's corpse lying on a cot, with two empty beer bottles and religious pamphlets scattered on the ground. A post mortem examination determined that he had died from heart failure caused by advanced atherosclerosis from his drug use. No identification was on the body, and photos shown around the neighborhood yielded no positive identification. His unclaimed body was buried in an unmarked pauper's grave in New York City's Potter's Field on Hart Island.

Late in 1969, Driscoll's mother sought the help of officials at Disney studios to contact him, for a hoped-for reunion with his father, who was nearing death. This resulted in a fingerprint match at the New York City Police Department, which located his burial on Hart Island. Although his name appears on his father's gravestone at Eternal Hills Memorial Park in Oceanside, California, his remains are still on Hart Island. In connection with the re-release of Song of the South in 1972, reporters researching the whereabouts of the film's star first reported his death.

== Awards ==
Driscoll receiving the Academy Juvenile Award from Donald O'Connor

Driscoll received an Academy Juvenile Award from the Academy of Motion Picture Arts and Sciences at the 22nd Academy Awards presentation in 1950. The award was presented as a special miniature Oscar statuette for "the outstanding juvenile actor of 1949" for his roles in So Dear to My Heart and The Window, both released that year. He also received the Milky Way Gold Star Award in 1954 for his work on television and radio.

For his contributions to the motion picture industry, Driscoll received a star on the Hollywood Walk of Fame at 1560 Vine Street in 1960.

== Tributes ==
In February 2009, singer-songwriter Benjy Ferree released Come Back to the Five and Dime Bobby Dee Bobby Dee, a concept album based in part on Driscoll's life.

In September 2011, American singer-songwriter Tom Russell released the song "Farewell Never Neverland" on the album Mesabi, an elegy for Bobby Driscoll as Peter Pan.

== Selected filmography ==
=== Film and television ===
| Year | Title | Role | Notes |
|---|---|---|---|
| 1943 | Lost Angel | Bobby, Boy on Train with Sucker | Uncredited |
| 1944 | The Fighting Sullivans | Al Sullivan as a child | Uncredited |
| 1944 | Sunday Dinner for a Soldier | Jeep Osborne | |
| 1944 | The Big Bonanza | Spud Kilton | |
| 1945 | Identity Unknown | Toddy Loring | |
| 1946 | Miss Susie Slagle's | Boy with Wounded Dog | Uncredited |
| 1946 | From This Day Forward | Billy Beesley | |
| 1946 | So Goes My Love | Percy Maxim | Alternative title: A Genius in the Family |
| 1946 | O.S.S. | Gerard | |
| 1946 | Three Wise Fools | Pixie | Uncredited |
| 1946 | Song of the South | Johnny | |
| 1948 | If You Knew Susie | Junior | Uncredited |
| 1948 | Melody Time | Himself | |
| 1949 | So Dear to My Heart | Jeremiah Kincaid | Academy Juvenile Award for 1949 |
| 1949 | The Window | Tommy Woodry | Academy Juvenile Award for 1949 |
| 1950 | Treasure Island | Jim Hawkins | |
| 1951 | When I Grow Up | Josh / Danny Reed | |
| 1951 | Lux Video Theatre | Billy Crandall | Episode: "Tin Badge" |
| 1952 | Father's Lion | Goofy Jr. | Voice |
| 1952 | The Happy Time | Robert "Bibi" Bonnard | |
| 1953 | Peter Pan | Peter Pan | Voice and close-up model |
| 1954 | The Loretta Young Show | Jim | Episode: "Big Jim" |
| 1954 | Medic | Pete Koslo | Episode: "Laughter is a Boy" |
| 1955 | The Scarlet Coat | Ben Potter | |
| 1956 | Crusader | Josef | Episode: "Fear" |
| 1956 | Climax! | Gary | Episode: "The Secret of River Lane" |
| 1957 | The Silent Service | Fletcher | Episode: "S01, E15, The Ordeal of the S-38" |
| 1958 | Frontier Justice | Trumpeter Jones | Episode: "Death Watch" |
| 1958 | The Party Crashers | Josh Bickford | |
| 1958 | The Millionaire | Lew Conover | Episode: "The Norman Conover Story" |
| 1959 | Trackdown | Mike Hardesty | Episode: "Blind Alley" |
| 1959 | Rawhide | Will Mason | Episode: "Incident of Fear in the Streets" |
| 1960 | The Brothers Brannagan | Johnny | Episode: "The Twisted Root" |
| 1960 | Rawhide | Billy Chance | S3:E9, "Incident of the Captive" |
| 1965 | Dirt | A Nun | Directed by Piero Heliczer (final film role) |
| 2023 | Once Upon a Studio | Peter Pan | Archival voice recordings; released posthumously; Peter Pan's new dialogue is provided by Lee Slobotkin. |

=== Stage ===
| Year | Performance | Role | Dates |
|---|---|---|---|
| 1954 | The Boy With a Cart | The Boy | February 1954 |
| 1954 | Ah, Wilderness! | Richard Miller | August 1954 (Pasadena Playhouse) |
| 1957 | Girls of Summer | unknown | May 1957 (Players Ring Theatre) |

=== Radio shows ===
(This is not necessarily a complete list; it displays all those that could be located and verified.)

| Year | Show | Role | Dates/Notes |
|---|---|---|---|
| 1946 | Song of the South – Promo-Interview | Bobby Driscoll and Luana Patten, hosted by Johnny Mercer | Aired in late 1946 |
| 1946 | Song of the South – Promo-Interview | Bobby Driscoll, Luana Patten, Walt Disney and James Baskett, hosted by Johnny Mercer | Aired in late 1946 |
| 1946 | The Dennis Day Show (aka A Day in the Life of Dennis Day) – "The Boy Who Sang For A King" | Cecil (a little carol-boy) | Aired on December 25 |
| 1948 | Family Theater – "As the Twig is Bent" | | Aired in February 1948 |
| 1948 | Family Theatre – "The Future is Yours" | | Aired on February 19 |
| 1948 | Family Theatre – "Jamie and the Promise" | | Aired on August 19 |
| 1948 | Family Theater – "A Daddy for Christmas" | | Aired on December 15 |
| 1950 | Family Theater – "Mahoney's Lucky Day" | | Aired on April 19 – hosted by himself |
| 1950 | Hallmark Playhouse – "Knee Pants" | | Aired on June 25 |
| 1950 | Movietown Radio Theater – "The Throwback" | | Aired on July 6 |
| 1951 | Lux Radio Theatre – "Treasure Island" | Jim Hawkins | Aired on January 29 |
| 1951 | Cavalcade of America – "The Day They Gave Babies Away" | | Aired on December 25 |
| 1953 | Family Theater – "The Courtship of John Dennis" | | Aired on April 8 |
| 1953 | Lux Radio Theater – "Peter Pan" | Peter Pan | Aired on December 10 |
| 1955 | Family Theater – "The Penalty" | | Aired on October 12 |
| 1956 | Family Theatre – "Fair Exchange" | | Aired on September 19 |
| 1957 | Family Theatre – "A Shot in the Dark" | | Aired on August 7 |

== Recordings ==
| Year | Performance | Role | Other notes |
|---|---|---|---|
| 1946/47 | "So Dear to My Heart" | Jeremiah Kincaid | Capitol Records (CDF 3000) – narrated by John Beal |
| 1950 | "Treasure Island" | Jim Hawkins | RCA Victor (Y-416) – narrated by Bobby Driscoll |
| 1953 | "Walt Disney's Peter Pan" | Peter Pan | RCA Victor (Y-486) |
| 1964 | "Treasure Island" | Jim Hawkins | Disneyland Records (DQ-1251) – condensed version of the original motion picture soundtrack – narrated by Dal McKennon |

== See also ==
- Wallace Berman (painting mentor)
- Chip 'n Dale: Rescue Rangers (film)
- Daveigh Chase

== Literature (selected) ==
- Byron Haskin – interviewed by Joe Adamson, The Directors Guild Of America and The Scarecrow Press, Inc. Metuchen, N.Y. and London, 1984 ISBN 0-8108-1740-3 – pages 166–186 (on Treasure Island, 1950)
- Natasha Fraser-Cavassoni, Sam Spiegel – The Incredible Life and Times of Hollywood's Most Iconoclastic Producer [...], 2003 Simon & Schuster, New York, London, Toronto, Sydney, Singapore, ISBN 0-684-83619-X – pages 119–20, 134, 143, 267, 361 (on When I Grow Up,1951)
- Richard Fleischer, Just Tell Me When To Cry – a Memoir, 1993 Carroll & Graf Publishers, Inc., New York ISBN 0-88184-944-8 – pages 79–83, 103 (on The Happy Time, 1952)
- Suzanne Gargiulo, Hans Conried – A Biography; with a Filmography and a Listing of Radio, Television, Stage and Voice Work, McFarland & Company Inc., Jefferson, North Carolina, 2002 – pages 78–79 (on Peter Pan, 1953)
- Michael Duncan and Christine McKenna, Semina Culture – Wallace Berman & His Circle, Santa Monica Museum Of Art, 2005 (on Driscoll's Artworks)
- Marc Elliot, Walt Disney – Hollywood's Dark Prince – A Biography, 1993, 1994, Andre Deutsch (publisher) Ltd., First (UK) Paperback edition, London, 1995, ISBN 0-233-98961-7
- Rudy Behlmer, Memo from David O. Selznick, The Viking Press, New York and Macmillan Company of Canada Ltd., 1972, ISBN unknown – pages 43n, 310, 431
- Maltin, Leonard. The Disney Films. Crown Publishers Inc., New York, 1973. LOC No. 72-84292. ISBN unknown – pages 74, 76, 78, 83–85, 87–88, 97–100, 107
- Mosley, Leonard. The Real Walt Disney. Grafton Books, 1986. ISBN 0-246-12439-3.
- Smith, David; Clark, Steven (1999). Disney: The First 100 Years. Glendale, CA: Disney Editions. ISBN 978-0786864423.
- Zanuck, Darryl F. and Rudy Behlmer, editor. Memo from Darryl F. Zanuck: The Golden Years at Twentieth Century-Fox. (1995) ISBN 0-8021-3332-0.
- Holmstrom, John. The Moving Picture Boy: An International Encyclopaedia from 1895 to 1995, Norwich, Michael Russell, 1996, pages 202–203.
- David Dye, Child and Youth Actors: Filmography of Their Entire Careers, 1914–1985. Jefferson, NC: McFarland & Co., 1988, pages 62–64.
- Best, Marc. Those Endearing Young Charms: Child Performers of the Screen, South Brunswick and New York: Barnes & Co., 1971, pages 80–84.
