= Uncle Sam Gets Around =

Song
- Published: 1941
- Composer(s): Ralph Rainger
- Lyricist(s): Leo Robin

Uncle Sam Gets Around is a song from 1941, composed by Ralph Rainger with lyrics by Leo Robin for the 20th Century-Fox film Cadet Girl.

In the song, Uncle Sam is a personified version of the United States, in which he helps people all across the country. In the film Cadet Girl, the song is performed by actor Shepperd Strudwick.
