= She Wrote the Book =

1946 film by Charles Lamont

- Directed by: Charles Lamont
- Written by: Oscar Brodney; Warren Wilson
- Produced by: Joseph Gershenson; Warren Wilson
- Starring: Joan Davis; Jack Oakie; Mischa Auer
- Cinematography: George Robinson
- Edited by: Fred R. Feitshans Jr.
- Music by: Edgar Fairchild
- Production company: Universal Pictures
- Distributed by: Universal Pictures
- Release date: May 31, 1946
- Running time: 80 minutes
- Country: United States
- Language: English

She Wrote the Book is a 1946 American comedy film directed by Charles Lamont and starring Joan Davis, Jack Oakie, and Mischa Auer. It was produced and distributed by Universal Pictures. The screenplay concerns a shy midwestern professor who travels to New York City to visit a publisher of her friend's book which turns out to be a racy bestseller.

== Plot ==
Jane Featherstone (Joan Davis) is a buttoned-down and pedestrian professor at small town Croyden College in Great Falls, Indiana who is making plans to present a paper in New York City. While talking to her dean's wife, Phyllis Fowler, she discovers that Fowler is actually the author of the racy bestselling novel Always Lulu, under the pen name Lulu Winters. Fowler asks Featherstone to assume her faux identity in order to pick up her royalty checks while in New York; Featherstone reluctantly agrees to pick up the $80,000, which Fowler has promised to donate to the college which is struggling financially. On the train to New York, Featherstone meets Eddie Caldwell, a charming engineer, and the two agree to a date once they reach the big city.

Once they arrive, Featherstone is greeted by publisher George Dixon and Jerry Marlowe, his advertising executive. Dixon and Marlowe attempt to escort her to an unexpected reception for Lulu. Featherstone tries to escape, but cracks her head in the process, and develops amnesia. Marlowe thinks she is Lulu, and Featherstone now believes she really is, which leads her to believe that the sultry novel is actually an autobiography. When Featherstone, as Lulu, informs everyone at the press conference that she has no plans to write a sequel, Dixon and Marlowe hatch a scheme to spend the $80,000. Meanwhile, Caldwell believes that Featherstone actually is the promiscuous Lulu, and ends the budding relationship. A bartender masquerading as a Count, an enamored shipping magnate, and photos that are seen back in Great Falls add twists and turns to the plot. Eventually, Featherstone returns home broke, but does recover her memory.

Now the Fowlers and Featherstone must devise a plot to recover the money, or stand by and watch the college close due to lack of funds. Featherstone returns to New York and dons the guise of Lulu once more. She gets the money back, and reconciles with Caldwell, who then returns to Great Falls with her.

== Cast ==
- Joan Davis as Jane Featherstone
- Jack Oakie as Jerry Marlowe
- Mischa Auer as Joe
- Kirby Grant as Eddie Caldwell
- Jacqueline deWit as Millicent Van Cleve
- Gloria Stuart as Phyllis Fowler
- Thurston Hall as Horace Van Cleve
- John Litel as Dean Fowler
- Lewis L. Russell as George Dixon
- Cora Witherspoon as Carrothers
- Selmer Jackson as Fielding
- Frank Dae as Professor
- Gladys Blake as Miss Donovan
- Verna Felton as Mrs. Kilgour
- Ethel May Halls as Mrs. Forbes
- Claire Whitney as Matron
- Edgar Dearing as Motorcycle Cop
- Chester Conklin as Man at Bar
- Broderick O'Farrell as Doctor
- Victoria Horne as Maid
- Marie Harmon as Blonde
- Olin Howland as Baggage Master

== Bibliography ==
- Stephens, Michael L. Art Directors in Cinema: A Worldwide Biographical Dictionary. McFarland, 1998.
