= South Sea Sinner =

1950 film by H. Bruce Humberstone

- Theatrical release poster
- Directed by: H. Bruce Humberstone
- Written by: Joel Malone adaptation
- Screenplay by: Joel Malone; Oscar Brodney
- Story by: Ladislas Fodor; László Vadnay (as Laszlo Vadnay)
- Produced by: Michael Kraike (as Michel Kraike)
- Starring: Macdonald Carey; Shelley Winters
- Cinematography: Maury Gertsman
- Edited by: Ted J. Kent
- Music by: Walter Scharf
- Production company: Universal Pictures
- Distributed by: Universal Pictures
- Release date: August 30, 1950 (United States)
- Running time: 88 minutes
- Country: United States
- Language: English

South Sea Sinner is a 1950 American adventure film directed by H. Bruce Humberstone and starring Macdonald Carey and Shelley Winters. It is a remake of Seven Sinners (1940). Liberace has a small role.

== Plot ==
A cafe owner on a South Sea island plays a dangerous game of blackmail with a fugitive from justice.

== Cast ==
- Macdonald Carey as 'Jake' Davis
- Shelley Winters as Coral
- Luther Adler as Cognac
- Frank Lovejoy as Doc
- Helena Carter as Margaret Landis
- Art Smith as Grayson
- Liberace as Maestro

== Production ==
South Sea Sinner was known as East of Java during filming. Helena Carter replaced Dorothy Hart. Star Macdonald Carey was borrowed from Paramount.

Filming took place in July 1949. Winters was accused of having a number of temperamental outbursts on set including a clash with Helena Carter. Winters admitted to being "nervous and tired" after making three films in five months and was "unused" to Humbersome's "close direction during song and dance scenes." She said she had to perform "a suggestive dance" when some exhibitors and their families visit the set and she was upset when an eight-year-old boy filmed her; she asked that he be removed to where she couldn't see him.

== Reception ==
The New York Times called it a "ridiculously romance-soggy film which has about as much South Seas flavour as a roadside papaya bar."

Filmink called it "an okay film, not as good as the one it was remaking... most notable for giving a small role to Liberace. Winters gets all the sympathy here... but it is nice to see several scenes where Carter and Winters are friendly to each other...Carter doesn’t seem particularly enthusiastic in this one."
