= Little Giant =

1946 film directed by William A. Seiter

- Theatrical release poster
- Directed by: William A. Seiter
- Screenplay by: Walter DeLeon
- Story by: Paul Jarrico; Richard Collins
- Produced by: Joe Gershenson
- Starring: Bud Abbott; Lou Costello; Brenda Joyce; Jacqueline deWit; Margaret Dumont
- Cinematography: Charles Van Enger
- Edited by: Fred R. Feitshans Jr.
- Music by: Edgar Fairchild
- Production company: Universal Pictures
- Distributed by: Universal Pictures
- Release date: February 22, 1946
- Running time: 91 minutes
- Language: English
- Budget: $775,000

Little Giant is a 1946 American comedy film directed by William A. Seiter and starring the comedy team of Abbott and Costello alongside Brenda Joyce and Jacqueline deWit. It was produced and distributed by Universal Pictures. The film was released in the United Kingdom with the alternative title On the Carpet.

== Plot ==
A naïve country boy named Benny Miller, from Cucamonga, California, has been taking correspondence phonograph lessons in salesmanship. Upon completion of the course, he leaves his mother and his girlfriend Martha to pursue a career in Los Angeles. He arranges a meeting with his Uncle Clarence, a bookkeeper with the Hercules Vacuum Cleaner Company. When he arrives to ask for a job, the sales manager, Eddie Morrison, mistakes him for one of the auditioning fashion models and has him remove his clothing. Morrison's secret wife, Hazel Temple, discovers the mistake and suggests that Benny be hired to avoid an accounting scandal, as they have been "cooking the books". Benny is fired from his salesman post after only one day. Clarence transfers Benny to the company's Stockton branch, which is run by Morrison's cousin, Tom Chandler.

Benny's misfortunes continue, including a prank played on him by his new coworkers when they convince him that he can read minds. However, the prank gives Benny sufficient confidence to become "Hercules' Salesman of the Year". He is sent back to the Los Angeles branch to receive his award, and while demonstrating his 'abilities' to Morrison, he alludes to the fact that Morrison has a secret bank account. Morrison sends his wife to obtain more information from Benny to determine what he actually knows. Hazel and Benny go to her apartment, where Benny becomes ill after smoking a cigar. Hazel then gives Benny a sedative, but accidentally takes it herself while he falls asleep from the cigar's ill effects. Morrison arrives home to find the two asleep together and fears the worst.

At the awards ceremony that evening, Benny learns of the mind-reading ruse, and overhears Morrison speaking ill of him. Benny returns to his mother and his girlfriend in Cucamonga, where he also encounters Chandler, his coworker Ruby, and the Hercules company president, Mr. Van Loon. They announce that Morrison has been fired, and has been replaced by Chandler. Benny is now sales manager of the Cucamonga district.

== Cast ==
- Bud Abbott as Eddie L. Morrison/T. S. Chandler
- Lou Costello as Benny Miller
- Brenda Joyce as Miss Ruby Burke
- Jacqueline deWit as Hazel Temple Morrison
- George Cleveland as Clarence Goodring
- Elena Verdugo as Martha Hill
- Mary Gordon as Ma Miller
- Pierre Watkin as P. S. VanLoon
- Donald MacBride as Conductor
- Margaret Dumont as Mrs. Hendrickson
- Chester Conklin as Porter (uncredited)

== Production ==
Filming took place between November 1 through December 17, 1945. Director, William A. Seiter was paid $100,000 and the two leads $110,000.

In this film, and the next Abbott and Costello film, The Time of Their Lives (1946), the comedians play separate characters instead of their usual partnership. This was due to falling box-office receipts for the team's releases during 1945 and growing animosity between the two that actually led them to split for a short time.

- Abbott played a third role in this film as well, that of Chandler's and Morrison's grandmother (only seen in a painting).
- The opening scene where Costello is trying to sell Sid Fields more than just the gasoline that he came to buy was originally filmed with another actor, Ed Waller.

== Re-release ==
The film was re-released in 1951 alongside The Time of Their Lives (1946), and again in 1954 on a double bill with their first movie, One Night in the Tropics (1940).

== Routines ==
Abbott and Costello perform the 7x13=28 routine, where Costello attempts to prove to Abbott that 7 times 13 equals 28, 28 divided by 7 equals 13, and seven 13's added together equals 28.

== Home media ==
This film has been released twice on DVD. The first time, on The Best of Abbott and Costello Volume Two, on May 4, 2004, and again on October 28, 2008, as part of Abbott and Costello: The Complete Universal Pictures Collection.
