= Jacqueline deWit =

American actress (1912–1998)

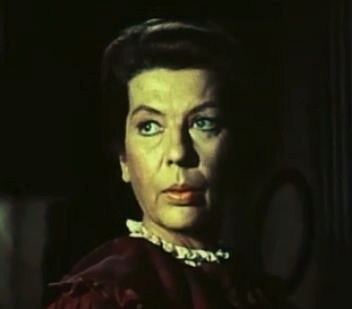
- Jacqueline deWit from the trailer for Twice-Told Tales (1963)
- Born: September 26, 1912; Los Angeles, California, US
- Died: January 7, 1998 (aged 85); Los Angeles, California, US
- Occupation: Actress
- Years active: 1943–1970

Jacqueline deWit (September 26, 1912 – January 7, 1998) was an American film and TV character actress from Los Angeles who appeared in over two dozen films, including Spellbound (1945), The Snake Pit, The Damned Don't Cry!, Tea and Sympathy, All That Heaven Allows and Harper. She also appeared in the 1946 Abbott and Costello comedy Little Giant, as Bud Abbott's wife.

== Career ==
She made numerous appearances on TV series such as Wagon Train, The Lineup, The Monkees, and most notably, in the iconic 1959 The Twilight Zone episode "Time Enough at Last", in which she played the nagging wife of the lead character played by Burgess Meredith.

DeWit's Broadway credits include The Taming of the Shrew in 1935. On radio, she portrayed Ruth Thompson on Meet Mr. McNultey and Valerie on Second Husband. She reprised the Thompson role on The Ray Milland Show, the TV version of Meet Mr. McNultey.

== Personal life and demise ==
DeWit died in Los Angeles on January 7, 1998, at age 85. She was cremated and returned to her family in residence.

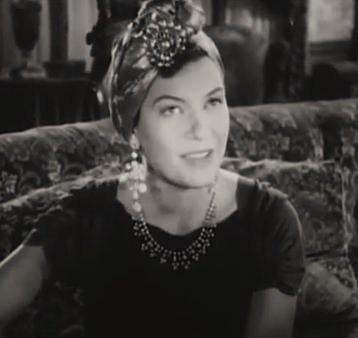
Jacqueline deWit in Fog Island (1945)

== Partial filmography ==
- The Leopard Man (1943) - Helene (uncredited)
- Dragon Seed (1944) - Wu Lien's Wife
- Black Magic (1944) - Justine Bonner
- Moonlight and Cactus (1944) - Elsie
- Fog Island (1945) - Emiline Bronson
- I'll Remember April (1945) - Whisper
- Swing Out, Sister (1945) - Pat Cameron
- Lady on a Train (1945) - Miss Fletcher
- Men in Her Diary (1945) - Marjorie Barnes
- That Night with You (1945) - Blossom Drake
- Week-End at the Waldorf (1945) - Kate Douglas
- Spellbound (1945) - Nurse (uncredited)
- Saratoga Trunk (1945) - Guilia Forosini
- Little Giant (1946) - Hazel Temple Morrison
- She Wrote the Book (1946) - Millicent Van Cleve
- Cuban Pete (1946) - Lindsay
- Wild Beauty (1946) - Cissy Cruthers
- The Lone Wolf in Mexico (1947) - Liliane Dumont
- Something in the Wind (1947) - Fashion Show Saleslady
- The Snake Pit (1948) - Celia Sommerville
- It's a Great Feeling (1949) - Trent's Secretary (uncredited)
- Chinatown at Midnight (1949) - Lisa Marcel
- The Damned Don't Cry (1950) - Sandra
- The Happy Years (1950) - Mrs. Cameron (uncredited)
- The Great Jewel Robber (1950) - Mrs. Arthur Vinson
- On the Isle of Samoa (1950) - Mrs. Marguerite Leach
- Never a Dull Moment (1950) - Myra Van Elson (uncredited)
- The First Legion (1951) - Miss Hamilton
- Carrie (1952) - Carrie's Sister Minnie
- She's Back on Broadway (1953) - Lisa Kramer
- Playgirl (1954) - Greta Marsh
- The Shrike (1955) - Katherine Meade
- Lay That Rifle Down (1955) - Aunt Sarah Greeb
- All That Heaven Allows (1955) - Mona Plash
- The Toy Tiger (1956) - Edna
- Tea and Sympathy (1956) - Lilly Sears
- Pocketful of Miracles (1961) - Louise - Governor's Wife (uncredited)
- It Happened at the World's Fair (1963) - Emma Johnson (uncredited)
- Twice-Told Tales (1963) - Hannah Pyncheon, Gerald's Sister
- Harper (1966) - Mrs. Kronberg

== Television ==
Year	Title	Role	Notes
1959	The Twilight Zone	Helen Bemis	S1:E8, "Time Enough at Last"
1967	The Monkees	Kate Nesmith, Mike's aunt	S2:E13, "Monkees in Texas"
