= Always a Bridesmaid (1943 film) =

1943 film by Erle C. Kenton

- Directed by: Erle C. Kenton
- Written by: Mel Ronson
- Based on: story by Oscar Brodney
- Produced by: Ken Goldsmith
- Starring: The Andrews Sisters
- Production company: Universal Pictures
- Distributed by: Universal Pictures
- Release date: 1943
- Running time: 61 minutes
- Country: USA
- Language: English

Always a Bridesmaid is a 1943 musical film starring The Andrews Sisters and Patric Knowles.

== Plot ==
Three operators of a lonely hearts club are investigated by two detectives.

== Production ==
Filming began 4 January 1943.
