= If You Knew Susie (film) =

1948 film by Gordon Douglas

- Theatrical release poster
- Directed by: Gordon Douglas
- Screenplay by: Warren Wilson; Oscar Brodney; Bud Pearson; Lester A. White
- Produced by: Eddie Cantor
- Starring: Eddie Cantor; Joan Davis; Allyn Joslyn; Charles Dingle; Bobby Driscoll
- Cinematography: Frank Redman
- Edited by: Philip Martin
- Music by: Edgar Fairchild
- Production company: RKO Pictures
- Distributed by: RKO Pictures
- Release date: February 7, 1948
- Running time: 90 minutes
- Country: United States
- Language: English

If You Knew Susie is a 1948 American comedy film directed by Gordon Douglas and written by Warren Wilson, Oscar Brodney, Bud Pearson and Lester A. White. The film was produced by, and starred, Eddie Cantor in his final starring role in a feature film. The film also stars Joan Davis, Allyn Joslyn, Charles Dingle and Bobby Driscoll. The film was released on February 7, 1948, by RKO Pictures.

== Plot ==
Sam and Susie Parker, a husband and wife team of vaudeville performers retire and return to Sam's ancestral historic New England home to be with their children. The pair turn their 17th century home into a hotel with entertainment that turns the community against them. Sam and Susie's son Junior faces bullying and ridicule because his ancestor was "America's First Draft Dodger" in the American War of Independence. The town boycott of the Parker's inn forces Sam and Susie to sell their home and auction off the family's antique furniture. When moving a cabinet, a recess in the wall is discovered that contains a letter to Sam's ancestor from George Washington thanking him for his services as a blockade runner that brought needed munitions to the Continental Army. An additional part of the letter is illegible.

The pair travel to Washington D.C. to investigate whether the document is genuine. The National Archives not only prove that it is, but they possess a misfiled but genuine identical copy with the illegible portion of Sam's copy declaring the new American government will pay Sam's ancestor or his descendants £10,000 with compounded interest for the munitions giving the Parkers seven billion modern dollars that attract the attention of the media and criminals.

== Cast ==
- Eddie Cantor as Sam Parker
- Joan Davis as Susie Parker
- Allyn Joslyn as Mike Garrett
- Charles Dingle as Mr. Whitley
- Bobby Driscoll as Junior
- Phil Brown as Joe Collins
- Sheldon Leonard as Steve Garland
- Joe Sawyer as Zero Zantini
- Douglas Fowley as Marty
- Margaret Kerry as Marjorie Parker
- Dickie Humphreys as Handy Clinton
- Howard Freeman as Mr. Clinton
- Mabel Paige as Grandma
- Sig Ruman as Count Alexis
- Fritz Feld as Chez Henri
- Isabel Randolph as Mrs. Clinton
- Kay Christopher as the Telephone Operator

== Reception ==
The film recorded a loss of $490,000.

== Soundtrack ==
- If You Knew Susie

Music by Joseph Meyer
Lyrics by Buddy G. DeSylva
Sung by Eddie Cantor

- What Do I Want with Money

Music by Jimmy McHugh
Lyrics by Harold Adamson
Performed by Eddie Cantor and Joan Davis

- My, How the Time Goes By

Music by Jimmy McHugh
Lyrics by Harold Adamson
Performed by Eddie Cantor and Joan Davis

- My Brooklyn Love Song

Music and Lyrics by George Tibbles and Ramey Idriss
Sung and Danced by Margaret Kerry and Dickie Humphreys

- Auld Lang Syne

Traditional Scottish 17th century music
Lyrics by Robert Burns

- Lucia Sextet

(1835) from "Lucia di Lammermoor"
Music by Gaetano Donizetti
Libretto by Salvatore Cammarano
Performed by Eddie Cantor, Joan Davis, George Murphy and Constance Moore from the film Show Business
