= Scarlet Angel =

1952 film by Sidney Salkow

- Film poster by Reynold Brown
- Directed by: Sidney Salkow
- Screenplay by: Oscar Brodney
- Produced by: Leonard Goldstein; Ross Hunter
- Starring: Yvonne De Carlo; Rock Hudson; Richard Denning
- Cinematography: Russell Metty
- Edited by: Ted J. Kent
- Music by: Joseph Gershenson
- Color process: Technicolor
- Production company: Universal Pictures
- Distributed by: Universal Pictures
- Release date: June 15, 1952 (Los Angeles)
- Running time: 81 minutes
- Country: United States
- Language: English
- Box office: $1.5 million (US rentals)

Scarlet Angel is a 1952 American historical adventure western film directed by Sidney Salkow and starring Yvonne De Carlo, Rock Hudson and Richard Denning. It was produced and distributed by Universal Pictures. The two leads appeared together again in Sea Devils the following year.

== Plot ==
New Orleans, 1865: In a disreputable saloon, the Scarlet Angel, sea captain Frank Truscott observes as scheming, gold-digging saloon girl Roxy McClanahan steals one customer's wallet and then sets her sights on him.

Discovering a sick woman with a baby, Roxy volunteers to spend the night. She comes up with an idea after the mother dies, stealing her identity and heading to San Francisco to find the woman's wealthy relatives, hoping to bring the baby back and receive an award. The dead woman's cousins are there, Susan Bradley not trusting Roxy while brother Malcolm Bradley develops both a romantic and economic interest in her.

Roxy plays a pair of suitors against each other until Frank suddenly returns to complicate her ambitions and to demand the money she stole. She becomes pressured to reveal her true identity and the child's. By the time she does, Roxy and Frank find themselves back in another saloon, bickering and fighting.

== Cast ==
- Yvonne De Carlo as Roxy McClannahan
- Rock Hudson as Frank Truscott
- Richard Denning as Malcolm Bradley
- Whitfield Connor as Norton Wade
- Bodil Miller as Linda Caldwell
- Amanda Blake as Susan Bradley
- Henry O'Neill as Morgan Caldwell
- Henry Brandon as Pierre
- Maude Wallace as Eugenia Caldwell
- Dan Riss as Walter Frisby
- Tol Avery as Phineas Calhoun
- Marlo Dwyer as Daisy
- Creighton Hale as Judge Ames

== Production ==
The film was based on an original screenplay by Oscar Brodney, however a New York Times review said it bore a strong resemblance to The Flame of New Orleans (1941).

Yvonne De Carlo agreed to make it under a new contract she had signed with Universal to make one film a year. Rock Hudson was cast opposite her and received his first star billing for the role.

Filming began in November 1951.

== Reception ==
The New York Times said "as a fetching Technicolor showcase for a lady who decidedly rates framing" the film "has its points. For some time Yvonne De Carlo has been flouncing through a series of routine costume adventures as a tough but good-natured minx from across the tracks who wades into society and inevitably backtracks with a bloke of her own caliber. This new one... is the mixture as before, nicely tinted, harmless and predictable from the word De Carlo.... The ornamental Miss De Carlo, who also has the makings of a fine, brassy comedienne, is still marking time on a stereotyped leash."
