= Oscar Brodney =

American screenwriter and lawyer (1907–2008)

- Born: February 18, 1907; Boston, Massachusetts, U.S.
- Died: February 12, 2008 (aged 100); Los Angeles, California, U.S.
- Occupations: Lawyer and screenwriter

Oscar Brodney (February 18, 1907 – February 12, 2008) was an American lawyer-turned-screenwriter. He is best known for his long association with Universal Studios, where his credits included Harvey, The Glenn Miller Story (1954), several Francis movies and the Tammy series.

== Biography ==
He was born and raised in Boston, Massachusetts, the son of an immigrant fisherman. One of seven children, a younger brother was the painter Edward Brodney and his older brother Max a doctor.

Brodney attended both Boston University and Harvard College. He earned a law degree from the latter and became a lawyer. He began writing night club and vaudeville routines as a hobby and became a radio writer.

=== Early film career ===
Brodney was working as a "radio idea man" in 1941. He and writing partner Jack Rubin had submitted a number of stories to Hollywood studios and only got polite rejections. They pitched a vehicle for Charles Boyer called Appointment for Love to Universal producer Bruce Manning, who bought the story.

He and Rubin became writers on Baby Face Morgan (1942) for the Producers Releasing Corporation, Brodney's first credit. He was then assigned to the musical When Johnny Comes Marching Home (1942) at Universal. Universal is where Brodney would work for most of his career.

When Johnny Comes Marching Home starred Allan Jones who was in Brodney's next films, Moonlight in Havana (1942) and You're a Lucky Fellow, Mr. Smith (1943) (he only provided the story of the latter). He did Always a Bridesmaid (1943) with the Andrews Sisters, an original of his; Rhythm of the Islands (1943) with Jane Frazee; and On Stage Everybody(1945).

In 1945 he was reportedly working on a biopic of dance teacher Arthur Murray and Love Takes a Holiday for Joan Davis but neither were made.

Brodney went over to RKO for What a Blonde (1945). Back at Universal he wrote She Wrote the Book (1946); Mexican Hayride (1948) with Abbott and Costello; For the Love of Mary (1948) with Deanna Durbin; and Are You with It? (1948) with Donald O'Connor.

He sold a story to Linda Darnell called Flamenco and Three Cornered Honeymoon for Jack Oakie but these were not made.

RKO used him again for If You Knew Susie (1948) the last movie of Eddie Cantor. At Universal he worked on Yes Sir, That's My Baby (1949) with O'Connor; Abbott and Costello Meet the Killer, Boris Karloff (1949), doing some uncredited work; The Gal Who Took the West (1949), based on a story he devised with William Bowers; Arctic Manhunt (1949); and Frenchie (1950) with Joel McCrea and Shelley Winters, based on his story.

Brodney was one of several writers on the hugely popular Harvey (1950). He also wrote South Sea Sinner (1950) with Winters; Curtain Call at Cactus Creek (1950) with O'Connor; Comanche Territory (1950) with Maureen O'Hara; and Little Egypt (1951) with Rhonda Fleming.

Universal put him on a Francis sequel, Francis Goes to the Races (1951) with O'Connor. He wroteKatie Did It (1951) with Ann Blyth; Double Crossbones (1951) a pirate comedy with O'Connor; Back at the Front (1952) with Tom Ewell; and Francis Goes to West Point (1952) with O'Connor.

A proposed musical starring O'Connor, Son of Robin Hood, was not made.

=== Historical films ===
Brodney began working on more historical material with Scarlet Angel (1952) with Yvonne De Carlo and Rock Hudson. He was nominated for an Oscar for The Glenn Miller Story screenplay which he wrote with Valentine Davies in 1954. That year he signed a two-year contract with the studio, where he had been based since 1942, except for two years during the war.

He wrote Walking My Baby Back Home (1953) and Francis Covers the Big Town (1953) with O'Connor, then returned to history with Sign of the Pagan (1954) with Jeff Chandler; The Black Shield of Falworth (1954) with Tony Curtis; The Spoilers (1955) with Chandler; Lady Godiva of Coventry (1955) with O'Hara; The Purple Mask (1955) with Curtis; and Captain Lightfoot (1955) with Hudson.

He wrote a film No, No Nora which appears to have not been made.

In March 1956 Brodney left Universal. He went to work at RKO on The Great Maestro a biopic of Ben Bernie that was never made.

Brodney began working in TV on shows such as Lux Video Theatre, Casey Jones, General Electric Theater, Schlitz Playhouse of Stars and Studio 57. He continued doing features like A Day of Fury (1956) and Star in the Dust (1956), and had a huge hit with Tammy and the Bachelor (1957) at Universal for producer Ross Hunter.

=== Producer ===
In the late 1950s he began to produce movies, his first one being When Hell Broke Loose at Paramount in 1958, where he was co-producer. The movie starred Charles Bronson.

He went to England where he produced and co wrote Bobbikins (1959), a vehicle for Max Bygraves at 20th Century Fox. Brodney continued to write for TV on such shows as Death Valley Days, The Alaskans, and Danger Man.

Back in Hollywood he produced a vehicle for Pat Boone, All Hands on Deck (1961), and one for Frankie Vaughan, The Right Approach (1961), both made at Fox.

He returned to Universal as a writer for Tammy Tell Me True (1961) and Tammy and the Doctor (1963). He also wrote The Brass Bottle (1964), I'd Rather Be Rich (1964) with Sandra Dee; and The Sword of Ali Baba (1965). A profile on I'd Rather Be Rich called Brodney "comparatively unsung" in Hollywood.

He wrote a film It Comes Up Love that was meant to be filmed in Britain in 1967 but appears to have never been made.

=== Later career ===
Brodney's final credits include episodes of the TV series It Takes a Thief and the British film 1000 Convicts and a Woman (1971) aka Fun and Games.

In 1971, he was working on a biopic of Babe Didrikson Zaharias. That year, he signed a two-picture deal with Robert Stone to write scripts, including one called Intrigue. Neither of these appear to have been made.

His final credit was Ghost Fever (1987).

In 1975 Brodney lived in the Smoke Tree neighborhood of Palm Springs, California. Brodney died in 2008, six days before his 101st birthday. Some members of Brodney's family learned of his death through Amy S. Bruckman's "Nextbison" WordPress webpage, referencing information from Wikipedia.

=== Death ===
Brodney died on February 12, 2008, in Los Angeles U.S. at the age of 100, six days shy of his 101st birthday.

== Filmography ==
- Baby Face Morgan (1942) (story)
- When Johnny Comes Marching Home (1942)
- Moonlight in Havana (1942)
- You're a Lucky Fellow, Mr. Smith (1943) (story)
- Always a Bridesmaid (1943) (story)
- Rhythm of the Islands (1943)
- On Stage Everybody (1945)
- What a Blonde (1945) (story)
- She Wrote the Book (1946)
- Mexican Hayride (1948) (screenplay)
- For the Love of Mary (1948)
- Are You with It? (1948)
- If You Knew Susie (1948)
- Yes Sir That's My Baby (1949)
- Abbott and Costello Meet the Killer, Boris Karloff (1949) uncredited
- The Gal Who Took the West (1949) (story and screenplay)
- Arctic Manhunt (1949) (screenplay)
- Frenchie (1950) (story and screenplay)
- Harvey (1950) (screenplay)
- South Sea Sinner (1950)
- Curtain Call at Cactus Creek (1950)
- Comanche Territory (1950) (screenplay)
- Little Egypt (1951) (screenplay) (story)
- Francis Goes to the Races (1951) (screenplay)
- Katie Did It (1951) (additional dialogue)
- Double Crossbones (1951) (also story)
- Back at the Front (1952)
- Francis Goes to West Point (1952)
- Scarlet Angel (1952)
- The Glenn Miller Story (1953)
- Walking My Baby Back Home (1953)
- Francis Covers the Big Town (1953)
- Sign of the Pagan (1954) (story)
- The Black Shield of Falworth (1954)
- The Spoilers (1955)
- Medal of Honor (1955) – documentary
- Lady Godiva of Coventry (1955) (also story)
- The Purple Mask (1955)
- Captain Lightfoot (1955)
- Lux Video Theatre (1955) – episode "Thunder on the Hill"
- A Day of Fury (1956) (screenplay)
- Star in the Dust (1956) (screenplay)
- Casey Jones (1957) – episode "Night Run"
- Studio 57 (1957) – episode "Mr November"
- Studio 57 (1957) – episode "Strange Quarry"
- Studio 57 (1957) – episode "with a Past"
- Tammy and the Bachelor (1957)
- General Electric Theater (1957) – episode "The Big Shooter"
- General Electric Theater (1957) – episode "The Town with a Past"
- Schlitz Playhouse of Stars (1957) – episode "Carriage from Britain"
- Lux Video Theatre (1957) – episode "The Undesirable"
- When Hell Broke Loose (1958) (screenplay)
- Bobbikins (1959) (producer)
- The Alaskans (2960) – episode "Spring Fever"
- Death Valley Days (1960) – episode "Eagle in the Rocks"
- Danger Man (1960) (TV series) – episode "An Affair of the State"
- All Hands on Deck (1961) (producer)
- The Right Approach (1961) (producer)
- Tammy Tell Me True (1961)
- Tammy and the Doctor (1963)
- The Brass Bottle (1964)
- I'd Rather Be Rich (1964)
- The Sword of Ali Baba (1965)
- It Takes a Thief (1969–70) – 4 episodes
- 1000 Convicts and a Woman (1971)
- Ghost Fever (1987)
