= Identity Unknown (1945 film) =

1945 film by Walter Colmes

- Directed by: Walter Colmes
- Written by: Robert Newman; Richard Weil
- Produced by: Howard Bretherton (associate producer); Walter Colmes (associate producer)
- Starring: Richard Arlen; Cheryl Walker; Roger Pryor
- Cinematography: Ernest Miller
- Edited by: John F. Link Sr.
- Music by: Jay Chernis
- Distributed by: Republic Pictures
- Release date: April 2, 1945
- Running time: 71 minutes
- Country: United States
- Language: English

Identity Unknown is a 1945 American war film starring Richard Arlen and Cheryl Walker, and directed by Walter Colmes.

It is based on Le Voyageur sans bagage (Traveller Without Luggage), a 1937 play by French playwright Jean Anouilh.

== Plot ==
World War II is ending. On a hospital ship heading home, Major Williams, a doctor, talks to a soldier suffering from amnesia. He is the only survivor of a group of four men defending a French farmhouse that was dive-bombed by German aircraft. All their dog tags were blown off. He chooses the name Johnny March for himself, and asks for the names and addresses of the men. The train taking him to an Army hospital stops at Bridgeton, Connecticut, the first on his list. Unthinkingly, he gets off, and is reported as AWOL.

At the house, he introduces himself to Sally as a friend of her late husband. She and her housemates invite him to stay. He asks her out for dinner, and she soon realizes that he did not know her husband at all. Johnny stops her from committing suicide and explains everything, showing her the list. When he heads for West Virginia, they kiss goodbye.

A young boy opens the door and throws his arms around him enthusiastically, believing he is his father, in spite of being told he would not return from the war. The boy unlocks the door to his father's office. The man was an architect. Johnny tries to draw and realizes he is not Tommy's father. The boy's babysitter arrives. Johnny tells him his father was a brave man and salutes him goodbye.

Johnny goes on to Chicago, only to reach another dead end. The soldier's younger brother, Joe, is a ne’er-do-well, a cashier in a bookie joint who defrauded a local gangster out of $6000. Now the gangster, Rocks Donnelly, shows up to collect. A hitman gunning for Donnelly fires two bullets into Joe. At the hospital, Johnny learns that the penniless Joe desperately wants to become a physician, as his late brother hoped to be. A grateful Donnelly forgives the debt and offers to pay for Joe's education. At a party to celebrate Donnelly's survival, Johnny talks to Wanda, Donnelly's girlfriend. She realizes he is pining for someone, and tells Johnny to call the girl and tell her so. Johnny does, renewing the bond between him and Sally. Johnny realizes he must be the last soldier on his list, and invites Sally to join him at the upcoming reunion in Iowa. She says he must find out if he is married.

Mr. and Mrs. Anderson have received a telegram confirming the loss of their son. They are about to sell their farm. Johnny stops the auction, convincing the Andersons that the greatest way they could honor their son’s legacy would be to perpetuate the happy times they had together on the farm.

Sally calls from a nearby train station, and a jubilant Johnny borrows the Andersons' pickup to meet her. In mid-embrace, he is arrested for speeding and reckless driving; then two MPs take him into custody, saying that the Army has precedence. He is whisked off to an Army hospital.

Sally is summoned to help break the news that they have discovered who he is. They want him to discover his true identity for himself. A couple of seemingly obscure questions trigger his full recollection of his prior life. He is Charles Aldrich, a captain in the Army Air Corps. He had been flying over the farmhouse in France in an attempt to drop supplies to the beleaguered soldiers when the German dive bombers struck. The Army cannot explain how he survived being blown out of his plane. At this point, having his identity back, and being free to marry Sally, are all that matters to both of them.

== Cast ==
- Richard Arlen as Johnny March
- Cheryl Walker as Sally MacGregor
- Roger Pryor as Rocks Donnelly
- Bobby Driscoll as Toddy Loring
- Lola Lane as Wanda
- Ian Keith as Major Williams
- John Forrest as Joe Granowski
- Sarah Padden as Mrs. Anderson
- Forrest Taylor as Mr. Anderson
- Frank Marlowe as Frankie
- Harry Tyler as Harry Parker
- Nelson Leigh as Colonel F. A. Marlin
- Charles Williams as Auctioneer
- Charles Jordan as Needles, Rocks' Henchman
- Dick Scott as Spike, Rocks' Henchman
- Marjorie Manners as Nurse
- Eddie Baker as Motorcycle Cop
