= Edward Brodney =

American painter

- Born: April 15, 1910; Boston, Massachusetts, United States
- Died: August 3, 2002 (aged 92); Lake Worth, Florida, United States
- Occupation: Artist

Edward Brodney (April 15, 1910 – August 3, 2002) was an American artist, particularly noted for his drawings and paintings of World War II. He was born and raised in Boston, Massachusetts, the son of an immigrant fisherman. One of seven children, an older brother was the screenwriter Oscar Brodney.

In 1936, Brodney won a competition by the Federal Works Progress Administration to paint a mural in the Massachusetts State House. He also painted a mural in the Newton, MA State House, and a second later in the Massachusetts State House.

Brodney was drafted in World War II, and served in the South Pacific. Officially serving as a medic, he painted soldiers in their everyday activities. Pictures in an exhibition of his work in honor of Memorial Day 2007 show servicemen repairing engines, carrying supplies off ships, storming a beach, and enjoying their days off.

Returning from the war, he opened an art gallery in Boston and continued to paint. Frequent subjects of his later work include people enjoying Boston Public Garden, horses, and people playing polo. Brodney later died of natural causes at the age of 92
