= Adam Carroll (American pianist) =

American pianist

- Born: Adam Carroll; March 19, 1897; Philadelphia, Pennsylvania, U.S.
- Died: February 28, 1974 (aged 76); New York City, New York, U.S.
- Occupation: Pianist

Adam Carroll (March 19, 1897 – February 28, 1974) was an American composer, pianist and conductor. Over the course of his career, he worked on nearly 500 player piano recordings and rolls, sometimes using house pseudonyms Cal Adams, Victor Lane, and Harry Shipman. He was one of the most prolific Ampico artists of the time.

== Early life and education ==
Carroll was born in Philadelphia and began playing piano by ear at the age of 7. He studied under Mrs. E. Barden at the age of 9, and later with Professor A. Von Stobbi. He began his professional career in 1916 as an accompanist for silent motion pictures and as a vaudeville pianist. Later, he worked on several radio shows, including the Gold Dust Twins radio show.

== Career ==
"Nanette" (1927), by Adam Carroll
Carroll's 1927 "Nanette"

Carroll made his first piano rolls in 1916 for a small Philadelphia company, where he met J. Milton Delcamp, who he would later follow to Ampico, where he made the majority of his roll recordings.

In 1951, Carroll became the general musical director for Westinghouse Electric Corporation and began his work in industrial shows. The intended audience of these shows were Westinghouse distributors and dealers; Carroll's goal was to entertain while educating attendees on ways improve their business practice. Over the next several years, Carroll wrote theme songs and created stage productions for several other organizations, including Easy Washing Machine Company in Syracuse, New York and the Cancer Cytology Foundation of America.

After the death of collaborator and friend Frank Fay in 1961, Carroll alleged that Fay had left him a sum of money and his Steinway grand piano in an unsigned will.

It was declared null by the California courts. Fay's New York Times obituary mentioned a court petition that appointed two close friends as the actor's guardians, but it was never confirmed that Carroll was one of the two. In 1963, Carrol began to fall inexplicably ill; he completely stopped eating and dropped to less than 90 pounds. He received shock therapy to which his body responded and he soon regained his health.

In 1965, at the request of former AMICA publisher Bill Knorp, Carroll began writing what became known as Adam Carroll's Recollections. The 72-page manuscript was edited by Richard J. Howe and published as a serial in the 1988 AMICA Bulletins. In it, he detailed the notable events of his career and his love of the Ampico. He also wrote about his encounters with Babe Ruth, Zez Confrey, and Fred Allen, among others. (He appeared with Allen's wife, Portland Hoffa, in The Little Show on Broadway.)

Carroll was featured in Broadway musicals including On Your Toes and Babes in Arms. He also appeared on the Eddie Cantor radio show and in the Ziegfeld Follies of 1935. Among others, he accompanied Fay, Jane Froman, Fred Astaire, Bert Wheeler and William Caxton.

Carroll died of cancer in 1974. He was living at The Lambs Club in New York at the time of his death.
