= Fred de Cordova =

American director and producer (1910–2001)

- Born: Frederick Timmins de Cordova; October 27, 1910; New York City
- Died: September 15, 2001 (aged 90); Woodland Hills, Los Angeles
- Education: Northwestern University, Harvard Law School
- Occupations: Director, producer

Frederick Timmins de Cordova (October 27, 1910 – September 15, 2001) was an American stage, motion picture, and television director and producer. He is best known for his work on The Tonight Show Starring Johnny Carson.

== Early life ==
De Cordova was born in New York City, the son of Margaret (née Timmins) and George de Cordova, who worked in the theatre business. George de Cordova was from a Jamaican Sephardic Jewish family related to Julian de Cordova, founder of the DeCordova Museum and Sculpture Park, and Waco, Texas, founder Jacob de Cordova. In his 1988 autobiography, de Cordova described his parents as con artists, who during his early years, lived well and skipped town without paying their bills. In 1931, he received an undergraduate degree in liberal arts from Northwestern University.

== Career ==
De Cordova's first theater credit was as a performer in Elmer, the Great (1928). After his graduation from Harvard Law School in 1933, he gained employment in the Shubert Theater organization for the next 10 years. He was variously a performer, stage manager, stage director, and finally, dialogue director, the last for Ziegfeld Follies of 1943.

He was a dialogue director in five films, including To Have and Have Not (1944). His first film-directing job was Too Young to Know (1945) for Warner Bros. He directed 23 movies, one of the better known was Bedtime for Bonzo (1951) starring future President Ronald Reagan and a chimpanzee. He also directed Rock Hudson, Errol Flynn, Tony Curtis, Audie Murphy, Yvonne de Carlo, Bob Hope, and Humphrey Bogart. Much of his career was at Universal Studios, where he was known for turning out entertaining pictures quickly, even with difficult actors, and on a low budget. His last film was Frankie and Johnny (1966) starring Elvis Presley.

De Cordova turned to directing television when the call for low-budget movies to serve as the second half of a double feature declined. His skills were perfect for TV. His TV career began in 1950 with directing The Jack Benny Program, on which he was played several times by actor Ross Elliott. Other programs he directed include The George Burns and Gracie Allen Show, The Bob Cummings Show, The George Gobel Show, December Bride, Leave It to Beaver, My Three Sons (108 episodes), and The Smothers Brothers Show. He directed and/or produced more than 500 TV series or segments. He produced The Tonight Show Starring Johnny Carson starting in 1970 using the name Fred de Cordova.

He became producer of the show in 1970 and executive producer in 1984. In a 1981 interview, he described his job as "chief traffic cop, talent scout, No. 1 fan and critic all rolled into one". De Cordova was described as ".. a large, looming, beaming man with horn-rimmed glasses, an Acapulcan tan, and an engulfing handshake that is a contract in itself, complete with small print and an option for renewal on both sides." He was executive producer when the final Carson Tonight Show signed off on May 22, 1992. He won five Emmys for his work on the show.

During tapings of the Tonight Show, de Cordova would sit in a chair just beyond the guests' couch so that he could cue Carson directly and speak with him during commercial breaks. By the 1980s, Carson occasionally spoke to de Cordova during the show, although usually the moment would pass so quickly that no time would be available to give de Cordova a microphone or catch him on camera.

These awkward exchanges became an object of parody. An episode of SCTV aired in 1981 featured the sketch "The Freddie de Cordova Show". The segment was almost an exact copy of the Tonight Show, except the host's desk was empty; de Cordova conducted all of his interviews from his usual perch off-camera. On the real program in 1988, as a takeoff on the installation of lights in Wrigley Field, Carson ceremonially installed a light on the edge of the set so that de Cordova could finally be seen.

In June 1991, Carson's son Ricky was killed in an automobile accident. A month later, Carson paid tribute to his son at the end of a show. De Cordova was concerned that the show was going long and gave Carson the "wrap it up" sign. Carson was so infuriated that he no longer allowed de Cordova on the studio floor.

Despite de Cordova's advanced age and lessened role in the waning days of the Carson period, Jay Leno kept him on the Tonight Show as a consultant. This arrangement lasted until 1997, which de Cordova said was far longer than he expected, though he lamented that he was no longer a "big shot".

During guest appearances on Late Night with Conan O'Brien, comedian Will Ferrell played the role of a deluded Robert Goulet, who believed himself to be a guest on The Tonight Show Starring Johnny Carson. Ferrell's fictional Goulet made references to de Cordova, insisting that de Cordova owed him money, or conversely, that Goulet owed de Cordova money.

In 1995 and 1998, respectively, de Cordova appeared as himself on The Larry Sanders Show in the fourth-season episode, "Eight," and in the sixth-season episode, "As My Career Lay Dying". The show's character Artie, a talk-show executive producer played by Rip Torn, is largely based on de Cordova.

Martin Scorsese's 1982 film, The King of Comedy, about a delusional fan (Robert De Niro) who kidnaps a late-night talk-show host (Jerry Lewis), cast de Cordova as the show's producer.

== Personal life ==
De Cordova married former actress Janet Thomas in 1963, and they remained married for the rest of his life.

== Death ==
De Cordova died aged 90 at the Motion Picture and Television Fund Hospital in Woodland Hills, California on September 15, 2001. Carson did not attend the service, but wrote a letter of condolence to Thomas that detailed his admiration and included a check. De Cordova was buried at Holy Cross Cemetery in Culver City, California.

== Filmography ==
Year	Title	Role	Notes
1962	The Jack Benny Program	(uncredited) Stage manager	TV
1968	My Three Sons	First Director	TV
1982	The King of Comedy	Bert Thomas	
1997	Mad About You	Hugh Moss	TV
1998	The Larry Sanders Show	Himself	TV
