= Aces of Action =

"Aces of Action" was the informal nickname given to the movie teaming of Richard Arlen and Andy Devine. They made a number of low budget action films together for Universal.

In February 1939 Universal announced they would make seven "outdoor pictures" starring the duo over the next year, all produced by Ben Pivar. The films were well received and the series continued until Arlen left Universal for Pine-Thomas Productions.

Universal then tried Devine in a series of other "buddy" comedies, teaming him with Leo Carillo and Broderick Crawford.

== Films ==
=== Richard Arlen & Andy Devine ===
- Mutiny on the Blackhawk (1939)
- Tropic Fury (1939)
- Legion of Lost Flyers (1939)
- Man from Montreal (1939)
- Danger on Wheels (1940)
- Hot Steel (1940)
- Black Diamonds (1940)
- The Leather Pushers (1940)
- The Devil's Pipeline (1940)
- Lucky Devils (1941)
- Mutiny in the Arctic (1941)
- Men of the Timberland (1941)
- Raiders of the Desert (1941)
- A Dangerous Game (1941)

=== Leo Carillo & Andy Devine ===
- The Kid from Kansas (1941) - and Dick Foran
- Road Agent (1941)
- Unseen Enemy (1942)
- Escape from Hong Kong (1942) - and Don Terry
- Danger in the Pacific (1942) - and Don Terry
- Top Sergeant (1942) - and Don Terry
- Timber! (1942) - and Dan Dailey

=== Broderick Crawford & Andy Devine ===
- South of Tahiti (1941) - and Brian Donlevy
- North to the Klondike (1941) - and Lon Chaney Jr
