= Mutiny on the Blackhawk =

1939 film directed by Christy Cabanne

- Film poster
- Directed by: Christy Cabanne
- Screenplay by: Michael L. Simmons
- Story by: Ben Pivar
- Produced by: Ben Pivar
- Starring: Richard Arlen; Andy Devine; Constance Moore
- Cinematography: John W. Boyle
- Edited by: Maurice Wright
- Production company: Universal Pictures
- Release date: September 1, 1939 (US)
- Running time: 67 minutes
- Country: United States
- Language: English

Mutiny on the Blackhawk is a 1939 American adventure film, directed by Christy Cabanne. It stars Richard Arlen, Andy Devine, and Noah Beery, and was released on September 1, 1939.

== Plot ==
During the 1840s, the ruthless officers of the smuggling ship Blackhawk abduct natives from the Sandwich Islands (now Hawaii) and force them into slave labor. United States Army captain Robert Lawrence, assigned to stop the Blackhawk’s illegal activities, stows away on the ship. When Lawrence and the crew are treated cruelly, they stage a mutiny and take over the ship. The Blackhawk docks in California for food and provisions, and Lawrence is met with opposition from military governor Bailey, in charge of an army installation. When the Mexican army invades the installation, Lawrence and his men battle valiantly to save the fort while boulders from a barricade fall from above. General Fremont and his troops race toward the fort with reinforcements.

== Cast ==
- Richard Arlen as Captain Robert Lawrence
- Andy Devine as Slim Collins
- Noah Beery as Captain of the Blackhawk
- Guinn "Big Boy" Williams as Blake, captain's mate
- Constance Moore as Helen Bailey
- Ray Mala as Woni
- Thurston Hall as Sam Bailey
- Sandra Kane as Tania Bailey
- Paul Fix as Sailor Jack
- Byron Foulger as Sailor Coombs
- Richard Lane as Kit Carson
- Charles Trowbridge as General Fremont

== Production ==
In 1939 Universal Pictures wanted to offer theaters a new series of action-adventure pictures with name stars, but it had to be done cheaply. Producer Ben Pivar and director Christy Cabanne, both accustomed to working with very low budgets, were assigned to make the series, and actors Richard Arlen and Andy Devine were signed for seven films. The premise of the series was to build each story around epic action scenes from Universal’s film library. Director Cabanne, a silent-film veteran, had to film new scenes that matched the pace and thrills of the spectacular sequences from the vault.

The first film was Mutiny on the Blackhawk, strongly reminiscent of the successful Mutiny on the Bounty. The major action sequences were taken from Sutter's Gold (1936) and The Rebel (1933). Author Don Miller, aghast at the sheer audacity of the project, wrote, “The story began literally at sea, leading to a mutiny on a slave ship, and so much for the title. Suddenly the scene somehow shifts to Old California, and the ex-mutineers and slaves are all enmeshed in fighting the Mexicans! As future Arlen-Devine films would attest, plots were merely excuses to employ as much stock footage as possible.” When Mutiny on the Blackhawk was syndicated for television, the old material was actually mentioned as part of the plot: “U.S. investigator discovers a brutal slave-trading ship and tries to organize a mutiny. Stock footage.”

== Reception ==
Trade reviewers took the insertions of old stock shots in stride and praised the film. Motion Picture Herald: “The sequences depicting the efforts of the fort folk in repelling the Mexican martinets are pictured excitingly, and the shots showing the release of rocks from rocky perches upon the marching men pack some dynamite celluloid thrills.” Showmen's Trade Review: “Mutiny on the Blackhawk is exciting and occasionally brutal melodrama with a stronger appeal for men than women. If red-blooded action is lacking in the associate feature, this will adequately supply it.” Box Office Digest agreed on this point: “A fine action picture and will therefore naturally draw more men and children than women. Accordingly this one could be spotted in with one of the many current woman’s pictures such as Lady of the Tropics, When Tomorrow Comes, and The Old Maid.” Most of the credit went to Christy Cabanne: “Cabanne’s direction has made some thin material seem worthwhile.” “Outstanding: Christy Cabanne’s direction.”

Still, the screenplay’s patchwork did not go unnoticed. Howard Barnes of the New York Herald Tribune covered the New York premiere at the Rialto Theatre, catering to fans of lowbrow comedy and action: “The Rialto’s patrons are not sticklers for dramatic sense, but even they are likely to be slightly baffled by the film. Something of a cross between Mutiny on the Bounty and Man of Conquest, the film skips blithely from maritime melodrama to Wild West shindigs with as little sustained continuity as any photoplay has had for some time.”

Exhibitors liked the film and recommended it to fellow theater owners. It was still playing profitably three years after its release: “We believe you will be surprised at the plot, action, and humor to this show. It is excellent, and did excellent business doubled with You're Not So Tough. I believe that the program picture, well made, will show a more consistent profit for the subsequent run [second-run and third-run theaters] than the A product.” Universal had enough confidence in the new series to keep Ben Pivar and Christy Cabanne busy; they had already completed two more films – Tropic Fury and Legion of Lost Flyers – by the time Mutiny on the Blackhawk was released.
