= The Devil's Pipeline =

1940 film directed by Christy Cabanne

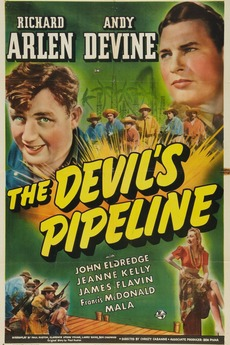
- Poster for the film
- Directed by: Christy Cabanne
- Screenplay by: Clarence Upson Young; Paul Huston; Larry Rhine; Ben Chapman
- Story by: Paul Huston
- Produced by: Ben Pivar
- Starring: Richard Arlen; Andy Devine; John Eldredge
- Cinematography: John Boyle
- Edited by: Edward Curtiss
- Music by: H. J. Salter
- Production company: Universal Pictures
- Release date: November 1, 1940 (US)
- Running time: 65 minutes
- Country: United States
- Language: English

The Devil's Pipeline is a 1940 American drama film directed by Christy Cabanne. It stars Richard Arlen, Andy Devine, and John Eldredge, and was released on November 1, 1940.

== Cast ==
- Richard Arlen as Dick Talbot
- Andy Devine as Andy Jennings
- John Eldredge as Butler
- Jean Brooks as Laura Larson (credited as Jeanne Kelly)
- Francis McDonald as Gaddi Sang
- James Flavin as Dowling
- Ray Mala as Talamu
- Eddy Waller as Benedict
- Dorothy Appleby as Stewardess
- Emory Parnell as Mr. Adams
- Jay Novello as Bandad
- Dick Botiller as Molugi
- John Rogers as Edwards
- Nestor Paiva as Grunyan
- Lotus Long as Mamba

== Reception ==
The Film Daily gave the picture a lukewarm review. They found it "moderately entertaining", with a well-paced story and a good cast. They felt Arlen and Devine were capable in their roles, and that Cabanne's direction was adequate. Harrison's Reports enjoyed the picture more, calling it "a pretty good program comedy-melodrama". While they felt the plot was a bit outlandish, they felt it was filled with action, and complimented Devine's performance. The New York Daily News gave the film another lukewarm review, calling it a "fair-to-middling melodrama". The Mount Carmel Item was more positive about the film, stating it was "a rugged action-packed adventure tale", "bristling with drama, suspense". And the Rocky Mount Telegram gave the film a positive review, stating that the comedic duo of Arlen and Devine maintained their "high standard" of performance in this picture, which was "exciting screen fare". They stated, "abounding in thrills, action and suspense, lightened by comic and romantic interludes, the production contains top-flight entertainment." They applauded the performances of Arlen, Devine, and Kelly.
