= A Dangerous Game (1941 film) =

1941 film

- Directed by: John Rawlins
- Written by: Larry Rhine; Ben Chapman; Maxwell Shane
- Produced by: Ben Pivar
- Starring: Andy Devine; Richard Arlen; Jean Brooks
- Cinematography: Stanley Cortez
- Edited by: Ray Curtiss
- Music by: Hans J. Salter
- Production company: Universal Pictures
- Distributed by: Universal Pictures
- Release date: August 22, 1941
- Running time: 62 minutes
- Country: United States
- Language: English

A Dangerous Game (also known as Who Killed Doc Robbin?) is a 1941 American mystery film directed by John Rawlins and starring Richard Arlen, Andy Devine and Jean Brooks. It is part of Universal Pictures's Aces of Action series. The New York Times called the film "a crack-brained murder mystery."

== Plot ==
Private detectives are called out to an isolated mental institution where several of the inmates are killed in a case tied to a valuable inheritance due to one of the patients.

== Cast ==
- Richard Arlen as Dick Williams
- Andy Devine as Andy McAllister
- Jean Brooks as Anne Bennett
- Edward Brophy as Bugsy
- Marc Lawrence as Joe
- Rudolph Anders as Dr. Fleming
- Richard Carle as Agatha - alias Mooseface Hogarty
- Andrew Tombes as Silas Biggsby
- Tom Dugan as Clem
- Vince Barnett as Ephriam
- Mira McKinney as Mrs. Hubbard
- Richard Kean as Mr. Whipple
- Irving Mitchell as Dr. Robin
- George Pembroke as Olaf Anderson
