= Stanley Cortez =

American cinematographer (1908–1997)

- Born: Stanislaus Samuel Kranz; November 4, 1908; New York City, New York, U.S.
- Died: December 23, 1997 (aged 89); Los Angeles, California, U.S.
- Education: New York University
- Occupation: Cinematographer
- Title: President of the American Society of Cinematographers
- Term: 1985–1987
- Predecessor: William A. Fraker
- Successor: Harry L. Wolf
- Relatives: Ricardo Cortez (brother)
- Awards: See below
- Military career
- Branch: United States Army
- Units: Signal Corps
- Conflicts: World War II

Stanley Cortez, ASC (born Stanislaus Samuel Kranz; November 4, 1908 – December 23, 1997) was an American cinematographer. He worked on over 100 films between 1929 and 1980, and was twice nominated for the Academy Award for Best Cinematography. He served as President of the American Society of Cinematographers from 1985 to 1987.

Cortez's most notable credits included Orson Welles' The Magnificent Ambersons (1942), John Cromwell's Since You Went Away (1945), Charles Laughton's The Night of the Hunter (1955), Nunnally Johnson's The Three Faces of Eve (1957), and Samuel Fuller's Shock Corridor (1963) and The Naked Kiss (1964).

He was the younger brother of actor and director Ricardo Cortez.

== Early life and education ==
Cortez was born Stanislaus Samuel Kranz in New York City in 1908, to a family of Austrian Jewish emigrants. His younger brother was actor Ricardo Cortez (born Jacob Krantz), and Cortez would adopt that surname as an adult to capitalize on his brother's fame. He graduated from New York University, and initially worked in portrait photography.

He was designer of elegant sets for several portrait photographers' studios (including that of Edward Steichen), which may have influenced his strong spatial awareness and ability to effectively use camera movement: a strong feeling for space and an ability to move his camera through that space in such a way as to embody it in film's two-dimensional format.

== Career ==
Cortez's first job in the film industry was for Pathé News, which later allowed him to give his films a newsreel-like touch when necessary. During the 1920s and the early 1930s, he worked his way up the usual Hollywood cameraman ladder: camera assistant, camera operator, and cinematographer. He managed to work for some of the great Hollywood cameramen, among them Karl Struss, Charles Rosher, and Arthur C. Miller. On the side, Cortez managed to do an experimental film, Scherzo (1932), that drew on the techniques of Slavko Vorkapić; the short has been described as a "symphony of light" by some critics." He joined the American Society of Cinematographers in 1933.

Cortez's early films often involved unconventional subjects, providing opportunities for experimentation. He often employed experimental techniques to enhance the visual appeal of his films. In The Forgotten Woman (1939) he did an extreme close-up of the actress's eyes to create a sense of seeing into her mind. Then Cortez had a big chance to work with Orson Welles on The Magnificent Ambersons (1942). Cortez saw the set for the film before being appointed the first cameraman. His spatial sense told him that shooting the film within these sets would be a tremendous challenge. Cortez's work on the film utilized his expertise in navigating studio space, a skill that was integral to its visual storytelling. Some of Cortez's work on The Magnificent Ambersons was reportedly edited out during post-production. During World War II, Cortez served in the U.S. Army Signal Corps.

In his later years, Cortez filmed several psychological dramas. In Smash-Up, the Story of a Woman (1947), Cortez used flashing lights placed inside the camera to create a sense of drunkenness. Charles Laughton gave Cortez another challenge – The Night of the Hunter. The film has been widely praised for its innovative use of lighting and cinematography, and Cortez managed to endow the camera movements with a musical quality. In The Three Faces of Eve (1957), Cortez found his actress: Joanne Woodward would be to him what Greta Garbo was to William H. Daniels and Marlene Dietrich to Lee Garmes. Cortez's subtle modulations of lighting match Woodward's equally subtle changes of expression, and both together create the sense of Eve, a psychologically split personality, becoming someone else. In Samuel Fuller's 1963 film Shock Corridor, the labyrinthine hallways and rooms of the studio set are transformed by Cortez's camera into a symbol of incarceration and insanity. Fuller used Cortez again on The Naked Kiss and sought him for The Big Red One in 1978 but the producer Gene Corman said the low-budget film couldn't afford him.

Cortez started Chinatown (1974), but director Roman Polanski replaced him after a few days of shooting due to a disagreement over visual style. He was replaced by John Alonzo.

He was the President of American Society of Cinematographers from 1985 to 1986. In 1990, he received their Lifetime Achievement Award.

== Death ==
Cortez died in 1997 of a heart attack and is buried in Mount Sinai Memorial Park Cemetery.

== Filmography ==
=== Film ===
Year	Title	Director	Notes
1936	Four Days' Wonder	Sidney Salkow	
1937	Armored Car	Lewis R. Foster	
1937	The Wildcatter	Lewis D. Collins	
1937	I Cover the War!	Arthur Lubin	with Harry Neumann
1938	The Lady in the Morgue	Otis Garrett	
1938	The Black Doll	Otis Garrett	Uncredited; with Ira H. Morgan
1938	Danger on the Air	Otis Garrett	
1938	Personal Secretary	Otis Garrett	
1938	The Last Express	Otis Garrett	
1938	Exposed	Harold Schuster	
1939	Risky Business	Arthur Lubin	
1939	For Love or Money	Albert S. Rogell	
1939	They Asked for It	Frank McDonald	
1939	The Forgotten Woman	Harold Young	
1939	Hawaiian Nights	Albert S. Rogell	
1939	Laugh It Off	Albert S. Rogell	
1940	Alias the Deacon	Christy Cabanne	
1940	Love, Honor and Oh-Baby!	Charles Lamont	
1940	The Leather Pushers	John Rawlins	
1940	It's a Date	William A. Seiter	Hawaii unit photography
1940	Margie	Otis Garrett; Paul Gerard Smith	
1940	Meet the Wildcat	Arthur Lubin	
1941	The Black Cat	Albert S. Rogell	
1941	San Antonio Rose	Charles Lamont	
1941	A Dangerous Game	John Rawlins	
1941	Badlands of Dakota	Alfred E. Green	
1941	Moonlight in Hawaii	Charles Lamont	
1941	Bombay Clipper	John Rawlins	
1942	Sealed Lips	George Waggner	
1942	Eagle Squadron	Arthur Lubin	
1942	The Magnificent Ambersons	Orson Welles	
1943	The Powers Girl	Norman Z. McLeod	
1943	Flesh and Fantasy	Julien Duvivier	with Paul Ivano
1944	Since You Went Away	John Cromwell	with Lee Garmes
1946	Let There Be Light	John Huston	Documentary
1947	Smash-Up, the Story of a Woman	Stuart Heisler	
1947	Secret Beyond the Door	Fritz Lang	
1948	Smart Woman	Edward A. Blatt	
1950	The Man on the Eiffel Tower	Burgess Meredith	
1950	The Underworld Story	Cy Endfield	
1950	The Admiral Was a Lady	Albert S. Rogell	
1951	The Basketball Fix	Felix E. Feist	
1951	Fort Defiance	John Rawlins	
1951	Stronghold	Steve Sekely	
1951	Furia roja	Steve Sekely; Víctor Urruchúa	
1952	Models Inc.	Reginald LeBorg	
1952	Abbott and Costello Meet Captain Kidd	Charles Lamont	
1953	The Neanderthal Man	E. A. Dupont	
1953	Shark River	John Rawlins	
1953	Yesterday and Today	Abner J. Greshler	Compilation film
1953	The Diamond Queen	John Brahm	
1954	Riders to the Stars	Richard Carlson	
1954	Apache	Robert Aldrich	Replaced by Ernest Laszlo
1954	Dragon's Gold	Aubrey Wisberg	
1954	Black Tuesday	Hugo Fregonese	
1955	The Night of the Hunter	Charles Laughton	
1956	Man from Del Rio	Harry Horner	
1957	Top Secret Affair	H. C. Potter	
1957	The Three Faces of Eve	Nunnally Johnson	
1958	South Pacific	Joshua Logan	2nd unit photography
1959	Thunder in the Sun	Russell Rouse	
1959	The Angry Red Planet	Ib Melchior	
1959	Vice Raid	Edward L. Cahn	
1960	Dinosaurus!	Irvin Yeaworth	
1961	Back Street	David Miller	
1963	Madmen of Mandoras	David Bradley	
1963	Shock Corridor	Samuel Fuller	
1964	The Naked Kiss	Samuel Fuller	
1964	The Candidate	Robert Angus	
1965	Nightmare in the Sun	Marc Lawrence	
1965	Young Dillinger	Terry O. Morse	
1966	The Ghost in the Invisible Bikini	Don Weis	
1966	The Navy vs. the Night Monsters	Michael A. Hoey	
1968	Blue	Silvio Narizzano	
1969	The Bridge at Remagen	John Guillermin	
1970	Tell Me That You Love Me, Junie Moon	Otto Preminger	Title sequence photography
1972	Doomsday Machine	Herbert J. Leder; Harry Hope; Lee Sholem	Shot in 1967
1974	Chinatown	Roman Polanski	Replaced by John A. Alonzo
1977	Another Man, Another Chance	Claude Lelouch	with Jacques Lefrançois
1978	Damien – Omen II	Don Taylor	Miniatures VFX photography
1980	When Time Ran Out	James Goldstone	Miniatures VFX photography

=== Television ===
Year	Title	Notes
1954	Medic	Episode: "White is the Color"
1959	Westinghouse Desilu Playhouse	Episode: "Come Back to Sorrento"
1960	Wanted Dead or Alive	2 episodes
1960	Dick Powell's Zane Grey Theatre	Episode: "Never Too Late"
1966	Family Affair	2 episodes
1971	Do Not Fold, Spindle or Mutilate	TV movie

== Awards and nominations ==
Institution	Year	Category	Work	Result	Ref.
Academy Awards	1943	Best Cinematography (Black-and-White)	The Magnificent Ambersons	Nominated	
Academy Awards	1945	Best Cinematography (Black-and-White)	Since You Went Away	Nominated	
American Society of Cinematographers	1990	Lifetime Achievement Award	—N/a	Won	
