= The Leather Pushers (1940 film) =

1940 film

- Directed by: John Rawlins
- Written by: Ben Chapman; Maxwell Shane; Larry Rhine
- Produced by: Ben Pivar
- Starring: Andy Devine; Richard Arlen; Astrid Allwyn
- Cinematography: Stanley Cortez
- Edited by: Arthur Hilton
- Music by: Hans J. Salter
- Production company: Universal Pictures
- Distributed by: Universal Pictures
- Release date: September 13, 1940
- Running time: 64 minutes
- Country: United States
- Language: English

The Leather Pushers is a 1940 American comedy action film directed by John Rawlins and starring Andy Devine, Richard Arlen and Astrid Allwyn. It was part of the Aces of Action series with the two stars.

It was based on the series of stories The Leather Pushers. Filming started July 1940.

== Cast ==
- Richard Arlen as Dick 'Kid' Roberts
- Andy Devine as Andy Adams
- Astrid Allwyn as Pat Danbury
- Douglas Fowley as Slick Connolly
- Charles D. Brown as J.R. Stevens
- Shemp Howard as Sailor McNeill
- Horace McMahon as Slugger Mears
- Charles Lane as Henry 'Mitch' Mitchell
- Wade Boteler as Fight Commissioner Dunlap
- George Lloyd as Joe Johnson
- Eddie Gribbon as Pete Manson
- Frank Mitchell as Grogan's Manager
- Reid Kilpatrick as Ringside Commentator
- Ben Alexander as Dan Brown, Announcer
- Frances Morris as Nurse
