= Caribbean Romance =

- Directed by: Lester Fuller
- Screenplay by: Robert Stephen Brode
- Produced by: Louis Harris
- Starring: Eric Blore; Olga San Juan; Mabel Paige; Jimmy Lydon; Alice Kirby; Marie McDonald; George M. Carleton; José Barroso
- Cinematography: Daniel L. Fapp
- Edited by: Harvey Johnston
- Music by: Werner R. Heymann
- Production company: Paramount Pictures
- Distributed by: Paramount Pictures
- Release date: December 17, 1943
- Running time: 20 minutes
- Country: United States
- Language: English

Caribbean Romance is a 1943 American romance film directed by Lester Fuller. The film stars Eric Blore, Olga San Juan, Mabel Paige, Jimmy Lydon, Alice Kirby, Marie McDonald, George M. Carleton and José Barroso. The film was released on December 17, 1943, by Paramount Pictures.

== Cast ==
- Eric Blore as Captain
- Olga San Juan as Linda
- Mabel Paige as Linda's aunt
- Jimmy Lydon as Peter Conway
- Alice Kirby as Passenger
- Marie McDonald as Passenger
- George M. Carleton as Linda's Uncle
- José Barroso as Orchestra Leader
