= Citadel of Crime =

1941 film by George Sherman

- Theatrical release poster
- Directed by: George Sherman
- Screenplay by: Don Ryan
- Produced by: George Sherman
- Starring: Robert Armstrong; Frank Albertson; Linda Hayes; Russell Simpson; Richard "Skeets" Gallagher; William Haade
- Cinematography: Ernest Miller
- Edited by: Lester Orlebeck
- Music by: Mort Glickman
- Production company: Republic Pictures
- Distributed by: Republic Pictures
- Release date: July 24, 1941
- Running time: 58 minutes
- Country: United States
- Language: English

Citadel of Crime is a 1941 American drama film directed by George Sherman and written by Don Ryan. The film stars Robert Armstrong, Frank Albertson, Linda Hayes, Russell Simpson, Richard "Skeets" Gallagher and William Haade. The film was released on July 24, 1941, by Republic Pictures.

== Cast ==
- Robert Armstrong as Cal Fullerton
- Frank Albertson as Jim Rogers
- Linda Hayes as Ellie Jackson
- Russell Simpson as Jess Meekins
- Richard "Skeets" Gallagher as Chet
- William Haade as Turk
- Jay Novello as Vince
- Paul Fix as Nick Gerro
- Bob McKenzie as Martin Jackson
- Wade Crosby as Rufe
- William "Billy" Benedict as Wes Rankins
