= Richard Arlen =

American actor (1899–1976)

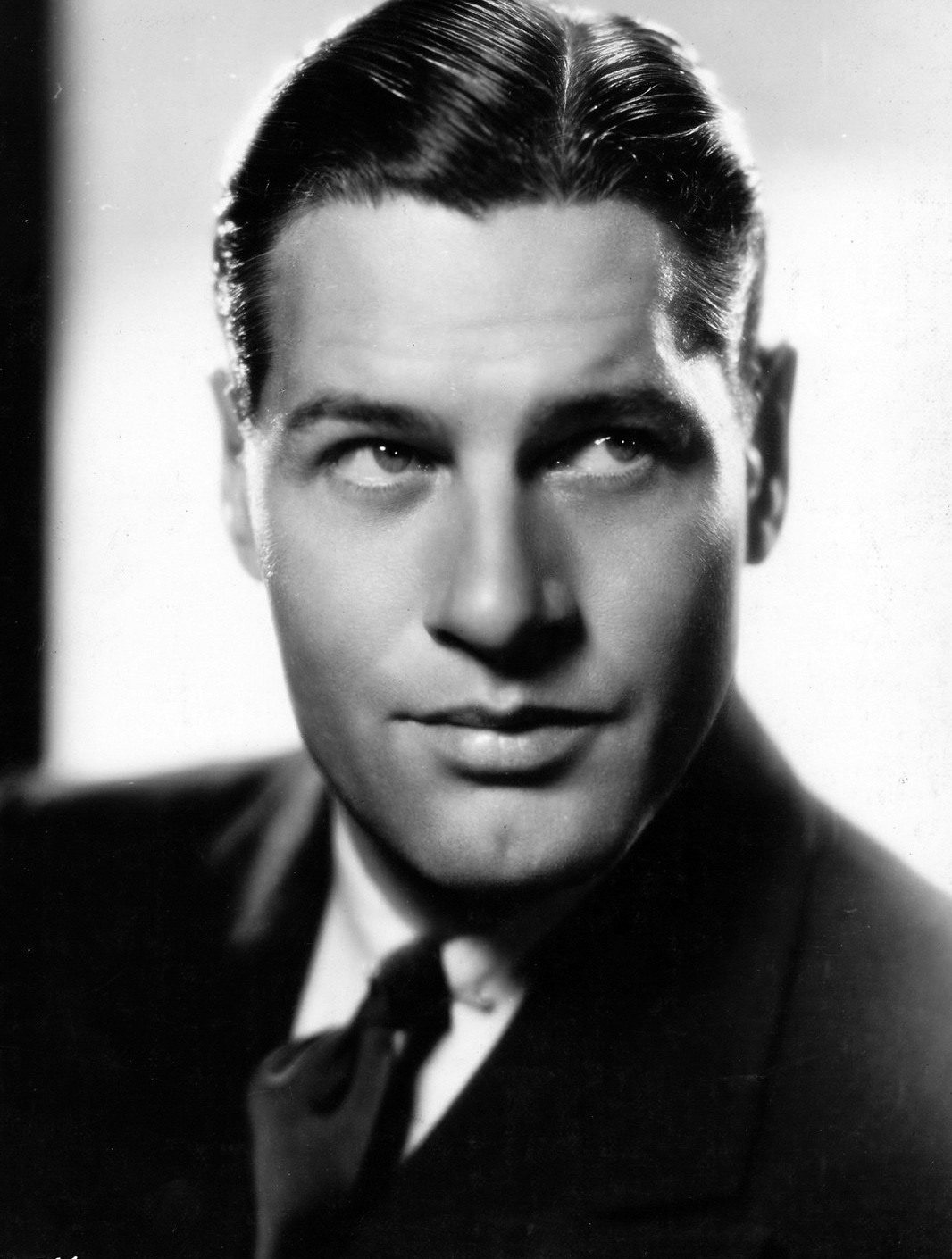
- Arlen in 1932
- Born: Sylvanus Richard Mattimore; September 1, 1899; Saint Paul, Minnesota, U.S.
- Died: March 28, 1976 (aged 76); Hollywood, California, U.S.
- Resting place: Holy Cross Cemetery, Culver City, California
- Education: University of Pennsylvania
- Occupation: Actor
- Years active: 1921–1976
- Spouses: Ruth Austin (m. 1920; div. 1923) Jobyna Ralston (m. 1927; div. 1946) Margaret Kinsella (m. 1946)
- Children: 2
- Military career
- Allegiance: United Kingdom; United States
- Branch: British Army; United States Army Air Forces
- Unit: Royal Flying Corps
- Conflicts: World War I World War II

Richard Arlen (born Sylvanus Richard Mattimore, September 1, 1899 – March 28, 1976) was an American actor of film and television.

== Early days ==
Arlen served in Canada as a pilot in the Royal Flying Corps during World War I.

He later taught as a United States Army Air Forces flight instructor in World War II.

Following his World War I service, he attended the University of Pennsylvania, then worked a variety of odd jobs before an accident as a film laboratory delivery boy landed him a role as an extra in a silent Hollywood film.

== Career ==
Arlen is best known to modern audiences for his role as a pilot in the inaugural Academy Award-winning Wings (1927) with Clara Bow, Charles 'Buddy' Rogers, Gary Cooper, El Brendel, and his second wife, Jobyna Ralston, whom he married in 1927. Arlen later appeared in the science fiction horror Island of Lost Souls (1932) with Charles Laughton, adapted from the H.G. Wells novel The Island of Dr. Moreau. He was among the more famous residents of the celebrity enclave, Toluca Lake, California.

In 1939, Universal teamed him with Andy Devine for a series of 14 B-pictures, mostly action-comedies with heavy reliance on stock footage from larger-scale films. They are informally known as the "Aces of Action" series, which is how the stars were billed in the trailers. When Arlen left the studio in 1941, the series continued with Devine teamed with a variety of other actors.

In the 1950s and early 1960s, Arlen was active in television, having guest starred in several anthology series, including Playhouse 90, The Loretta Young Show, The 20th Century Fox Hour, and in three episodes of the series about clergymen, Crossroads.

He appeared on the November 9, 1968 episode of Petticoat Junction playing himself. The episode was called "Wings" and it was in direct reference to the 1927 silent movie Wings.

Arlen appeared in westerns, such as Lawman, Branded, Bat Masterson, Wanted: Dead or Alive, Wagon Train, and Yancy Derringer, and in such drama/adventure programs as Ripcord, Whirlybirds, Perry Mason, The New Breed, Coronado 9, and Michael Shayne.

== Personal life ==
Arlen supported Barry Goldwater in the 1964 United States presidential election.

Arlen married actress Jobyna Ralston in January 1927, and they had one son. She divorced him in 1945 claiming in court that he had "packed up" and left her. He got married again in 1946 to New York socialite Margaret Kinsella.

== Death ==
On March 28, 1976, Arlen died of pulmonary emphysema in North Hollywood, California.

== Legacy ==
In 1960, Arlen was inducted into the Hollywood Walk of Fame with a motion pictures star at 6755 Hollywood Boulevard for his contributions to the film industry.

== Filmography ==
Features
Year	Title	Role	Notes
1921	Ladies Must Live	Minor Role	Uncredited; Lost film
1922	The Green Temptation		Uncredited; Lost film
1922	The Ghost Breaker	Ghosts	Uncredited
1923	Quicksands		Uncredited; Lost film
1923	Vengeance of the Deep	Jean	Lost film
1923	Hollywood	Himself	Lost film
1924	The Fighting Coward	Minor Role	Uncredited
1925	Sally	Minor Role	Uncredited; Lost film
1925	In the Name of Love	Dumas Dufrayne	Lost film
1925	The Coast of Folly	Bather	Scenes deleted Lost film
1926	The Enchanted Hill	Link Halliwell	Lost film
1926	Behind the Front	Percy Brown	
1926	Padlocked	'Tubby' Clark	
1926	You'd Be Surprised	Photographer	Uncredited
1926	Old Ironsides	Seaman	Uncredited
1927	Wings	David Armstrong	
1927	Rolled Stockings	Ralph Treadway	Lost film
1927	The Blood Ship	John Shreve	
1927	Sally in Our Alley	Jimmie Adams	Lost film
1927	Figures Don't Lie	Bob Blewe	Lost film
1927	She's a Sheik	Capt. Colton	
1928	Under the Tonto Rim	Edd Denmeade	Lost film
1928	Feel My Pulse	Her Problem	
1928	Ladies of the Mob	Red	Lost film
1928	Beggars of Life	The Boy (Jim)	
1928	Manhattan Cocktail	Fred Tilden	Lost film
1929	The Man I Love	Dum-Dum Brooks	
1929	The Four Feathers	Lt. Harry Faversham	
1929	Thunderbolt	Bob Moran	
1929	Dangerous Curves	Larry Lee	
1929	The Virginian	Steve	
1930	Burning Up	Lou Larrigan	
1930	The Border Legion	Heyst	
1930	Dangerous Paradise	Dick Bailey	
1930	The Light of Western Stars	Jim Cleve	
1930	Paramount on Parade	Hunter	Episode: 'Dream Girl'
1930	The Sea God	Phillip 'Pink' Barker	
1930	The Santa Fe Trail	Stan Hollister	
1930	Only Saps Work	Lawrence Payne	
1931	The Conquering Horde	Dan McMasters	
1931	Gun Smoke	Brad Farley	
1931	The Lawyer's Secret	Joe Hart	
1931	The Secret Call	Tom Blake	
1931	Caught	Lt. Tom Colton	
1931	Touchdown	Dan Curtis	
1932	Wayward	David Frost	
1932	Sky Bride	Bert 'Speed' Condon	
1932	Guilty as Hell	Frank C. Marsh	
1932	Tiger Shark	Pipes Boley	
1932	The All American	Gary King	
1932	Island of Lost Souls	Edward Parker	
1933	Song of the Eagle	Bill Hoffman	
1933	College Humor	Mondrake	
1933	Three-Cornered Moon	Dr. Alan Stevens	
1933	Golden Harvest	Walt Martin	
1933	Hell and High Water	Capt. J.J. Jericho	
1933	Alice in Wonderland	Cheshire Cat	
1934	Come On Marines!	Lucky Davis	
1934	She Made Her Bed	Wild Bill Smith	
1934	Ready for Love	Julian Barrow	
1934	Helldorado	Art Ryan	
1935	Let 'Em Have It	Mal Stevens	
1935	The Calling of Dan Matthews	Dan Matthews	
1936	Three Live Ghosts	William 'Bill' Jones, an alias of William Foster	
1936	The Mine with the Iron Door	Bob Harvey	
1937	Secret Valley	Lee Rogers	
1937	The Great Barrier	Hickey	
1937	Artists and Models	Alan Townsend	
1937	Murder in Greenwich Village	Steve Havens Jackson Jr.	
1938	No Time to Marry		
1938	Call of the Yukon	Gaston Rogers	
1938	Straight, Place and Show	Denny Paine	
1939	Missing Daughters	Wally King	
1939	Mutiny on the Blackhawk	Capt. Robert Lawrence	
1939	Tropic Fury	Dan Burton	
1939	Legion of Lost Flyers	Gene 'Loop' Gillan	
1939	Man from Montreal	Clark Manning	
1940	Danger on Wheels	Larry Taylor	
1940	Hot Steel	Frank Stewart	
1940	The Leather Pushers	Dick 'Kid' Roberts	
1940	The Devil's Pipeline	Dick Talbot	
1940	Black Diamonds	Walter Norton	
1941	Lucky Devils	Dick McManus	
1941	Mutiny in the Arctic	Dick Barclay	
1941	Men of the Timberland	Dick O'Hara	
1941	Power Dive	Brad Farrell	
1941	Forced Landing	Dan Kendall	
1941	Raiders of the Desert	Dick Manning	
1941	A Dangerous Game	Dick Williams	
1941	Flying Blind	Jim Clark	
1942	Torpedo Boat	Skinner Barnes	
1942	Wildcat	Johnny Maverick	
1942	Wrecking Crew	Matt Carney	
1943	Submarine Alert	Lewis J. 'Lee' Deerhold	
1943	Aerial Gunner	Sgt / Lt. Jonathan 'Jon' Davis	
1943	Alaska Highway	Woody Ormsby	
1943	Minesweeper	Richard Houston – posing as Jim 'Tennessee' Smith	
1944	Timber Queen	Russell Evans	
1944	The Lady and the Monster	Dr. Patrick Cory	
1944	That's My Baby!	Tim Jones	
1944	Storm Over Lisbon	John Craig	
1944	The Big Bonanza	Captain Jed Kilton	
1945	Identity Unknown	Johnny March	
1945	The Phantom Speaks	Matt Fraser	
1946	Accomplice	Simon Lash	
1947	Buffalo Bill Rides Again	Buffalo Bill	
1948	Speed to Spare	Cliff Jordan	
1948	The Return of Wildfire	Dobe Williams	
1948	When My Baby Smiles at Me	Harvey Howell	
1949	Grand Canyon	Mike Adams	
1950	Kansas Raiders	Union Captain	
1951	Silver City	Charles Storrs	
1952	Flaming Feather	Showdown Calhoun	
1952	Hurricane Smith	Brundage	
1952	The Blazing Forest	Joe Morgan	
1953	Sabre Jet	Gen. Robert E. 'Bob' Hale	
1954	Devil's Harbor	John 'Captain' Martin	
1955	Stolen Time	Tony Pelassier	
1956	Hidden Guns	Sheriff Ward Young	
1956	The Mountain	C.W. Rivial	
1958	Cavalry Command	Sgt. Jim Heisler	
1959	Warlock	Bacon	
1960	Raymie	Garber	
1961	The Last Time I Saw Archie	Col. Edwin Martin	
1963	The Young and The Brave	Col. Ralph Holbein	
1963	The Crawling Hand	Lee Barrenger	
1963	Law of the Lawless	Ben the Bartender	
1964	The Best Man	Sen. Oscar Anderson	
1964	The Shepherd of the Hills	Old Matt	
1964	Young Fury	Sheriff Jenkins	
1964	Sex and the College Girl	Charles Devon	
1965	The Human Duplicators	Lt. Shaw – National Intelligence	
1965	Black Spurs	Pete Muchin	
1965	Town Tamer	Doctor Kent	
1965	The Bounty Killer	Matthew Ridgeway	
1965	Apache Uprising	Captain Gannon	
1966	Johnny Reno	Ned Duggan	
1966	To the Shores of Hell	Brig. Gen. F.W. Ramsgate	
1966	Waco	Sheriff Billy Kelly	
1967	Red Tomahawk	Deadwood Telegrapher	
1967	Hostile Guns	Sheriff Travis	
1967	Fort Utah	Sam Tyler	
1967	The Road to Nashville	Studio Boss	
1968	Buckskin	Townsman	
1968	Anzio	Capt. Gannon	Uncredited
1968	Rogues' Gallery	Man in Club	
1975	The Sky's the Limit	Grimes	
1976	Won Ton Ton, the Dog Who Saved Hollywood	Silent Film Star 2	
1977	A Whale of a Tale	Mr. Monahan	Final film role

=== Short subjects ===
- A Trip Through the Paramount Studio (1927) as Himself
- Hollywood on Parade No. A-6 (1933) as Himself / The Great Arlen (uncredited)
- Hollywood on Parade No. A-9 (1933) as Himself – Dick Arlen (uncredited)
- How to Break 90 #4: Downswing (1933) as Himself – Dick Arlen (uncredited)
- Hollywood on Parade No. B-6 (1934) as Himself
- Hollywood Hobbies (1935) as Himself
- Screen Snapshots Series 15, No. 3 (1935) as Himself
- Swing with Bing (1940) as Himself – Movie Star playing Golf
- Screen Snapshots: Sports in Hollywood (1940) as Himself, Golf Player
- Soaring Stars (1942) as Himself (uncredited)
- Unusual Occupations (1942) as Himself (uncredited)
- Paramount Victory Short: A Letter from Bataan (1942) as Pvt. John W. Lewis
- Bat Masterson (1961) as Sheriff Dan Rainey – S3E16 "The Price of Paradise"
