= Shark River (film) =

1953 film by John Rawlins

- Theatrical release poster
- Directed by: John Rawlins
- Screenplay by: Louis Lantz; Lewis Meltzer
- Story by: John Rawlins
- Produced by: John Rawlins
- Starring: Steve Cochran; Carole Mathews; Warren Stevens
- Cinematography: Stanley Cortez
- Edited by: Harold Gordon
- Music by: Irving Gertz
- Production company: John Rawlins Productions
- Distributed by: United Artists
- Release date: February 18, 1953
- Running time: 80 minutes
- Country: United States
- Language: English

Shark River is a 1953 American Florida Western adventure film directed by John Rawlins and written by Louis Lantz and Lewis Meltzer. It stars Steve Cochran, Carole Mathews, Warren Stevens, Robert Cunningham, Ruth Foreman, Spencer Fox and Bill Piper, and was released on November 13, 1953, by United Artists.

== Plot ==
After the Civil War, Clay Webley (Warren Stevens), returns to Florida as a fugitive wanted for murder. He escapes prison along with his wounded cellmate, Curtis Parker (Robert Cunningham). Clay reunites with his brother, Dan Webley (Steve Cochran), who reluctantly agrees to guide the pair through the treacherous swamplands of the Everglades to the Gulf of Mexico, with the ultimate plan of escaping by boat to Cuba and safety.

The group faces numerous dangers in the unforgiving wilderness, including alligators, snakes, flooding, and harsh conditions. They also encounter Seminole Indians and a young widow named Jane (Carole Mathews). Tensions mount as the dying Curtis, on his deathbed, reveals that Clay is indeed guilty of the murder he was accused of—straining the brothers' relationship and complicating their perilous journey while evading pursuing authorities.

== Cast ==
- Steve Cochran as Dan Webley
- Carole Mathews as Jane Daughterty
- Warren Stevens as Clay Webley
- Robert Cunningham as Curtis Parker
- Ruth Foreman as Mrs. Daughterty
- Spencer Fox as Johnny Daughterty
- Bill Piper as Sheriff
- Don Carroll as Deputy Sheriff

== Production ==
The film is a historical period film set in Florida. It features depictions of the Seminole tribe of Native Americans as well as the dangerous beauty of Florida Everglades. The film was one of several crime thrillers set and filmed in Florida during the 1950s. Like Yellowneck, Snake River portrays Civil War deserters as unsavory cowards who ultimately get what they deserve.
