= Ridin' Down the Canyon =

1942 film by Joseph Kane

- Theatrical release poster
- Directed by: Joseph Kane
- Written by: Albert DeMond (screenplay); Norman Houston (story); Robert Creighton Williams (story)
- Produced by: Harry Grey (associate producer)
- Starring: Roy Rogers
- Cinematography: Jack A. Marta
- Edited by: Edward Mann
- Distributed by: Republic Pictures
- Release date: December 30, 1942
- Running time: 55 minutes
- Country: United States
- Language: English

Ridin' Down the Canyon is a 1942 American Western film directed by Joseph Kane and starring Roy Rogers. Members of the Western Writers of America chose its title song as one of the Top 100 Western songs of all time, ranked 97.

== Plot summary ==
Bobbie Blake has three big loves in his life; his sister, their wild horse business and listening to Roy Rogers and the Sons of the Pioneers on the radio. When rustlers steal their recently acquired horses prior to their sale Bobbie runs away from home to get Roy and the Sons of the Pioneers to track down the rustlers and bring them to justice. Though Roy and his friends are radio entertainers, Bobbie's desire for justice can't be stopped. Fate allows his heroes to bring the rustlers to justice, especially as the leader of the rustlers uses Roy's radio show to secretly broadcast instructions to his gang.

== Cast ==
- Roy Rogers as Roy Rogers
- George "Gabby" Hayes as Gabby
- Bob Nolan as Bob Nolan, (Leader, Sons of the Pioneers)
- Sons of the Pioneers as Musicians
- Robert "Buzz" Henry as Bobbie Blake
- Linda Hayes as Alice Blake
- Addison Richards as Gus Jordan
- Lorna Gray as Barbara Joyce
- Olin Howland as The Jailer
- James Seay as Burt Wooster
- Hal Taliaferro as Henchman Pete
- Forrest Taylor as Jim Fellowes
- Roy Barcroft as Henchman
- Pat Brady as Pat Brady

== Soundtrack ==
- Sons of the Pioneers - "Sagebrush Symphony" (Written by Tim Spencer)
- Sons of the Pioneers - "Curly Joe From Idaho" (Written by Tim Spencer and Roy Rogers)
- Roy Rogers and the Sons of the Pioneers - "Blue Prairie" (Written by Bob Nolan and Tim Spencer)
- Roy Rogers and the Sons of the Pioneers - "My Little Buckaroo" (Written by Jack Scholl and M.K. Jerome)
- Lorna Gray - "Who Am I?" (Written by Walter Bullock and Jule Styne)
- Roy Rogers - "In A Little Spanish Town" (Written by Sam Lewis, Joe Young and Mabel Wayne)
- Roy Rogers and the Sons of the Pioneers - "Ridin' Down the Canyon" (Written by Smiley Burnette)
