= Mutiny in the Arctic =

1941 film directed by John Rawlins

- Directed by: John Rawlins
- Written by: Maurice Tombragel; Victor McLeod; Paul Huston
- Produced by: Ben Pivar
- Starring: Richard Arlen; Andy Devine; Anne Nagel; Don Terry; Addison Richards; Oscar O'Shea
- Cinematography: John W. Boyle
- Edited by: Edward Curtiss
- Music by: Hans J. Salter
- Production company: Universal Pictures
- Distributed by: Universal Pictures
- Release date: April 17, 1941
- Running time: 64 minutes
- Country: United States
- Language: English

Mutiny in the Arctic is a 1941 American action adventure film directed by John Rawlins and starring Richard Arlen, Andy Devine and Anne Nagel. It was part of their Aces of Action series produced and released by Universal Pictures. It was also known by the alternative title Northern Lights.

== Cast ==
- Richard Arlen as Dick Barclay
- Andy Devine as Andy Adams
- Anne Nagel as Gloria Adams
- Addison Richards as Ferguson
- Don Terry as Cole
- Oscar O'Shea as Capt. Bob Morrissey
- Harry Cording as Harmon
- Jeff Corey as The Cook
- Harry Strang as The Helmsman
- John Rogers as The Mess Boy
- John Bagni as Loma
- Stanley Blystone as The Bos'un
- David Sharpe as Joe Crewman
- Samuel Adams as First Officer Swenson
- Gibson Gowland as Crewman

== Production ==
Filming took place in March 1941. Its budget was $80,000.

== Reception ==
The New York Times said "as juveniles go, this rates as a flat B."
