= Raiders of the Desert =

1941 film by John Rawlins

- Directed by: John Rawlins
- Written by: Maurice Tombragel; Victor McLeod
- Produced by: Ben Pivar
- Starring: Andy Devine; Richard Arlen; Maria Montez; Turhan Bey
- Cinematography: John W. Boyle
- Edited by: Maurice Wright
- Music by: Hans J. Salter
- Production company: Universal Pictures
- Distributed by: Universal Pictures
- Release date: July 18, 1941
- Running time: 60 minutes
- Country: United States
- Language: English

Raiders of the Desert is a 1941 American comedy adventure film directed by John Rawlins and starring Andy Devine, Richard Arlen and Linda Hayes. The film was produced and distributed by Universal Pictures. It featured early appearance by Turhan Bey and Maria Montez. It was the first time she made a film set in the Orient.

== Plot ==
Two stowaway adventurers, Dick and Andy, jump a ship in a Middle Eastern port, which is benefiting from the development by American businessman Jones. However some local Arabs, led by Sheikh Talifah, wish to take over. They try to assassinate Jone and succeed in killing the local Arab leader. However Dick and Andy lead a fight back which results in Talifah being killed. Dick marries Jones' secretary, Alice.

== Cast ==
- Richard Arlen as Dick Manning
- Andy Devine as Andy McCoy
- Linda Hayes as Alice Evans
- Maria Montez as Zuleika
- Lewis Howard as Abdullah
- Ralf Harolde as Sheik Talifah
- George Carleton as Jones
- Turhan Bey as Hassen Mohammed
- Harry Cording as Rawlins
- Sig Arno as Suliman
- Neyle Marx as Zeid
- John Harmon as Ahmed

== Production ==
Richard Arlen and Andy Devine had been teamed a number of times for Universal. Filming started in early June 1941. Maria Montez was given a role but it was a relatively small one. It was released by July of that year.

== Reception ==
The Los Angeles Times called the film "entertaining" and that Arlen and Devine were "a very happy team... Maria Montez is attractive as an oasis charmer".

The Monthly Film Bulletin called it "a naive story presented in a crude fashion" with "some exciting moments with competent acting".
