= Sudan (film) =

1945 film by John Rawlins

- Directed by: John Rawlins
- Screenplay by: Edmund L. Hartmann
- Produced by: Paul Malvern
- Starring: Maria Montez; Jon Hall; Turhan Bey
- Cinematography: George Robinson
- Edited by: Milton Carruth
- Music by: Milton Rosen
- Production company: Universal Pictures
- Distributed by: Universal Pictures
- Release date: April 18, 1945 (United States)
- Running time: 76 minutes
- Country: United States
- Language: English

Sudan is a 1945 American Technicolor adventure film directed by John Rawlins and starring Maria Montez, Jon Hall and Turhan Bey.

It was the last film Montez made for over a year due to fights with Universal.

== Plot ==
Young, Naila becomes queen of the ancient Egyptian kingdom of Khemis when her father is killed in a slave revolt. Continuing her penchant for going incognito among the people, she seeks out rebel leader Herua. But through palace treachery, she herself is captured and enslaved. After many adventures, she finds herself rescued by (and attracted to) the very rebel she was seeking. Will gratitude or revenge win out?

== Cast ==
- Maria Montez as Queen Naila
- Jon Hall as Merab
- Turhan Bey as Herua
- Andy Devine as Nebka
- George Zucco as Horadef
- Robert Warwick as Maatet
- Philip Van Zandt as Setna (as Phil Van Zandt)
- Harry Cording as Uba
- George Lynn as Bata
- Charles Arnt as Khafre
- James Dime as a guard
- Tor Johnson as a slaver

== Production ==
During development the film was called The Queen of the Nile. It was described as a "successor to Arabian Nights".

Production began in June 1944. In January of the following year the title was changed to Sudan.

It was the one collaboration between Montez and Hall where she wound up with another man at the end (Bey).
