= Badlands of Dakota =

1941 film by Alfred E. Green

- Theatrical release poster
- Directed by: Alfred E. Green
- Written by: Victor McLeod (additional comedy sequences)
- Screenplay by: Gerald Geraghty
- Story by: Harold Shumate
- Produced by: George Waggner
- Starring: Robert Stack; Ann Rutherford; Richard Dix; Frances Farmer
- Cinematography: Stanley Cortez
- Edited by: Frank Gross
- Color process: Black and white
- Production company: Universal Pictures
- Distributed by: Universal Pictures
- Release date: September 15, 1941
- Running time: 74 minutes
- Country: United States
- Language: English

Badlands of Dakota is a 1941 American Western film directed by Alfred E. Green and starring Robert Stack, Ann Rutherford, Richard Dix and Frances Farmer. Its plot follows a marshal and his wife who cross paths with Wild Bill Hickok and Calamity Jane.

Stack called it "one of the most forgettable Westerns ever made, a nonmasterpiece."

== Plot ==
In the spring of 1876, Bob Holliday, a Deadwood, Dakota Territory saloon owner sends his younger brother, Jim, to Saint Louis to retrieve his intended bride, Anne Grayson. Jane (Calamity Jane), a gunfighter, scout, and influential citizen who dresses mannishly, is hurt by former associate Bob rejecting her in favor of Anne.

On the return trip Jim and Anne fall in love and are married at Fort Pierre. When they arrive at Deadwood, Bob gives Anne a huge parade, not knowing about the marriage. As well, Jim meets Wild Bill Hickok. Jane drops by the new couple to suggest Anne leave town, but they tell her about the marriage; Jane tells Bob.

Angered, Bob convinces Deadwood's citizens to make Jim City Marshal under questionable motives, i.e., to make trouble for Jim. Jim and Anne leave their gold mining as Jim becomes marshal, and they struggle with the danger and responsibility of cleaning up Deadwood during its wildest days.

Villainous local Jack McCall runs a ring of criminals pretending to be Native Americans; Bob, frustrated, surreptitiously joins his gang. McCall's gang, dressed as Sioux, raids and robs innocent people. Hickok recognizes McCall as someone who shot the Kansas City Kid in the back, and McCall is jailed.

Jim, Jane and a posse pursue the gang on one of the raids. Jim fights Bob, not knowing it is he; Bob flees, but drops a keepsake from their father. Jim wonders if Bob is the "Sioux", but Bob successfully denies it later, back in town, saying that someone stole the keepsake from him. McCall breaks out of jail, and shoots Hickok in the back of the head and kills him.

Jane tries to get back Bob, even putting on a dress for him, but he rebuffs her. At a later time, she believes that the real Sioux are going to attack, and has the town prepare.

The Sioux attack, and during this, the gang, again dressed as Sioux, attempt to rob the bank. Jim enters the bank and, recognizing Bob, tries to stop him, but Bob disarms him. Jane enters, and when Bob threatens Jim, is forced to shoot Bob. McCall sneaks behind her and prepares to strike her, but the dying Bob shoots McCall. Jane breaks down in tears.

General Custer and the 7th Cavalry arrive, routing the Sioux. The town cheers him, as he says he is going to deal with the Sioux once and for all at the Little Big Horn.

== Cast ==
- Robert Stack as Jim Holliday
- Ann Rutherford as Anne Grayson
- Richard Dix as Wild Bill Hickok
- Frances Farmer as Calamity Jane (called "Jane" in the film)
- Broderick Crawford as Bob Holliday
- Hugh Herbert as Rocky Plummer
- Andy Devine as Spearfish
- Lon Chaney Jr. as Jack McCall
- Fuzzy Knight as Hurricane Harry
- Addison Richards as George Armstrong Custer
- The Jesters as 1876 Saloon Entertainers
- Dwight Lathan as Member, The Jesters
- Walter Carlson as Member, The Jesters
- Guy Bonham as Member, The Jesters
