= The Girl from Mexico =

1939 film by Leslie Goodwins

- Directed by: Leslie Goodwins
- Written by: Lionel Houser; Joseph Fields
- Produced by: Robert Sisk
- Starring: Lupe Vélez; Donald Woods; Leon Errol; Linda Hayes; Donald MacBride; Edward Raquello
- Cinematography: Jack MacKenzie
- Edited by: Desmond Marquette
- Music by: Albert Hay Malotte; Harry Tierney; Roy Webb
- Distributed by: RKO Radio Pictures
- Release date: June 2, 1939
- Running time: 71 minutes
- Country: United States
- Language: English

The Girl from Mexico is a 1939 American comedy film directed by Leslie Goodwins and written by Lionel Houser and Joseph Fields. The film stars Lupe Vélez, who plays a hot-headed, fast-talking Mexican singer taken to New York for a radio gig, who decides she wants the ad agency man for herself.

This low-budget film's unexpected box-office success resulted in a sequel, Mexican Spitfire, and eventually a film series of eight films all together. All eight were directed by Goodwins, used venerable comedian Leon Errol as a comic foil, and showcased Vélez's comic persona, indulging in broken-English malapropisms, troublemaking ideas, sudden fits of temper, occasional songs, and bursts of Spanish invective. The film was released June 2, 1939, by RKO Radio Pictures.

== Plot ==
Denny Lindsay, a radio man, brings back a singer, Carmelita Fuenes, from Mexico.

== Cast ==
- Lupe Vélez as Carmelita Fuentes
- Donald Woods as Dennis 'Denny' Lindsay
- Leon Errol as Uncle Matthew 'Matt' Lindsay
- Linda Hayes as Elizabeth Price
- Donald MacBride as L. B. Renner
- Edward Raquello as Tony Romano
- Elisabeth Risdon as Aunt Della Lindsay
- Ward Bond as Mexican Pete, the Wrestler
