= John Rogers (actor) =

British actor (1888–1963)

- Born: 28 August 1888; Manchester, Lancashire, United Kingdom
- Died: 31 July 1963 (aged 74); San Bernardino County, California, United States
- Occupation: Actor
- Years active: 1929–1957 (film & TV)

John Edward Rogers (28 August 1888 – 31 July 1963) was a British stage and film actor active in American cinema. He was the son of English playwright Charles Rogers and brother of actors Charles and Gerald Rogers.

A character actor, he played a number of supporting roles in the 1930s. These grew increasingly smaller during the 1940s where he was often uncredited. His final handful of appearances were in television during the 1950s. He was often cast in London-set productions, including Raffles and Charlie Chan in London.

Rogers penned an unpublished autobiography which was used as source material for biographical research into his father.

He committed suicide in 1963.

== Selected filmography ==
=== Film ===
- Behind That Curtain (1929)
- The Sea Wolf (1930)
- Raffles (1930)
- Old English (1930)
- Charlie Chan Carries On (1931)
- Dr. Jekyll and Mr. Hyde (1931)
- Limehouse Blues (1934)
- Charlie Chan in London (1934)
- Grand Canary (1934)
- Jane Eyre (1934)
- Long Lost Father (1934)
- Wharf Angel (1934)
- A Feather in Her Hat (1935)
- People Will Talk (1935)
- Charlie Chan at the Race Track (1936)
- Klondike Annie (1936)
- Love Before Breakfast (1936)
- Think Fast, Mr. Moto (1937)
- Bulldog Drummond Comes Back (1937)
- The Buccaneer (1938)
- A Christmas Carol (1938)
- Mysterious Mr. Moto (1938)
- Typhoon (1940)
- The Devil's Pipeline (1940)
- Mutiny in the Arctic (1941)
- The Undying Monster (1942)
- Lassie Come Home (1943)
- The Canterville Ghost (1944)
- Alaska (1944)
- The Suspect (1944)
- Dangerous Intruder (1945)
- Moss Rose (1947)
- Forever Amber (1947)
- Les Miserables (1952)
- Loose in London (1953)

=== Television ===
- China Smith (1952, 1 episode)
- Front Page Detective (1952, 1 episode)
- The Adventures of Jim Bowie (1957, 1 episode)

== Bibliography ==
- Hardy, Phil. The BFI Companion to Crime. A&C Black, 1997.
- Keaney, Michael F. Film Noir Guide: 745 Films of the Classic Era, 1940-1959. McFarland, 2003.
- Kear, Lynn & Rossman, John. The Complete Kay Francis Career Record: All Film, Stage, Radio and Television Appearances. McFarland, 2016.
- McKay, James. Ray Milland: The Films, 1929-1984. McFarland, 2020.
