= Sued for Libel =

1939 film directed by Leslie Goodwins

- Directed by: Leslie Goodwins; Doran Cox
- Screenplay by: Jerry Cady
- Story by: Wolfe Kaufman
- Produced by: Cliff Reid
- Starring: Kent Taylor; Linda Hayes; Lilian Bond; Morgan Conway
- Cinematography: Jack MacKenzie
- Edited by: Desmond Marquette
- Music by: Roy Webb
- Production company: RKO Radio Pictures
- Release date: July 5, 1939 (US)
- Running time: 66 minutes
- Country: United States
- Language: English

Sued for Libel is a 1939 American mystery film directed by Leslie Goodwins from a screenplay by Jerry Cady, based on Wolfe Kaufman's story. Released on October 27, 1939, by RKO Radio Pictures (who also produced it), the film stars Kent Taylor, Linda Hayes, Lilian Bond, and Morgan Conway.

== Cast ==
- Kent Taylor as Steve Lonegan
- Linda Hayes as Maggie Shane
- Lilian Bond as Mrs. Muriel Webster
- Morgan Conway as Albert Pomeroy
- Richard Lane as Smiley Dugan
- Roger Pryor as District Attorney Willard Corbin
- Thurston Hall as David Hastings
- Emory Parnell as Jerome Walsh
- Roy Gordon as Colonel Jasper White
- Edward Earle as Judge Samuel Clark
- Lester Dorr as Pomeroy's butler
