= Song of the Eagle =

1933 film by Ralph Murphy

- Directed by: Ralph Murphy
- Screenplay by: C. Graham Baker; Willard Mack; Casey Robinson; Gene Towne
- Produced by: Charles R. Rogers
- Starring: Charles Bickford; Richard Arlen; Mary Brian; Jean Hersholt
- Cinematography: Henry Sharp
- Edited by: Joseph Kane
- Music by: John Leipold; Harold Lewis
- Production company: Paramount Pictures
- Distributed by: Paramount Pictures
- Release date: April 28, 1933
- Running time: 83 minutes
- Country: United States
- Language: English

Song of the Eagle is a 1933 American pre-Code drama film directed by Ralph Murphy and starring Charles Bickford, Richard Arlen, Mary Brian and Jean Hersholt. It was produced and distributed by Paramount Pictures. Its release coincided with the ongoing repeal of the Eighteenth Amendment that had outlawed alcohol.

== Plot ==
The fortunes of the German American family Hoffman from 1916 to 1933 during World War I, when the United States is at war with their native Germany, and during the Prohibition Era when the family's lager business is suddenly made illegal is explored. If the family's brewery is to continue they need to turn to bootlegging.

== Cast ==
- Charles Bickford as Joe Anderson
- Richard Arlen as Bill Hoffman
- Mary Brian as Elsa Kranzmeyer
- Jean Hersholt as Otto Hoffman
- Louise Dresser as Emma Hoffman
- Andy Devine as Mud
- George E. Stone as Gus
- Gene Morgan as Charlie
- Bert Sprotte as Emil Kranzmeyer
- George Meeker as August Hoffmann
- Julie Haydon as Gretchen
- James Bradbury Jr. as Slats

== Bibliography ==
- Schlossheimer, Michael. Gunmen and Gangsters: Profiles of Nine Actors Who Portrayed Memorable Screen Tough Guys. McFarland, 2018.
