= Linda Hayes (actress) =

American actress (1918–1995)

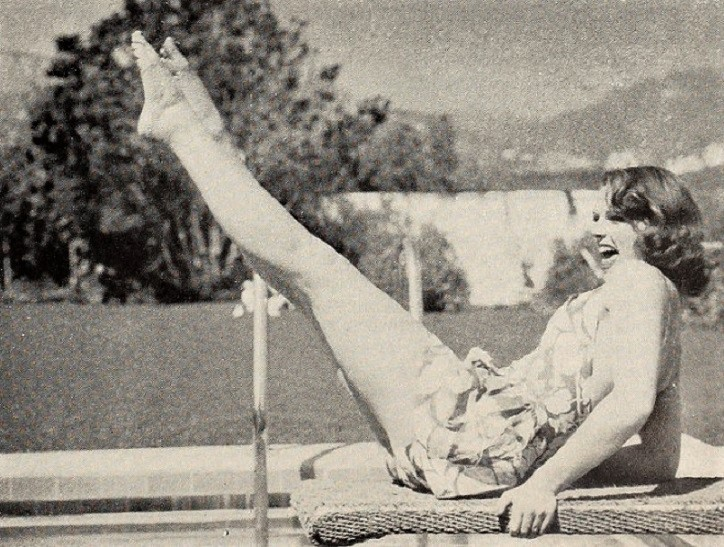
- Born: Rachelle Germano; October 11, 1918; Sac City, Iowa, U.S.
- Died: December 19, 1995 (aged 77); Palm Desert, California, U.S.
- Occupation: Actress
- Spouses: Lou Crosby (m. 1941; died 1984) Frank W. Walker (m. 1984; died 1986)
- Children: 3 (including Cathy)

Linda Hayes (born Rachelle Germano, October 11, 1918 – December 19, 1995) was an American actress.

== Biography ==
Hayes was raised on a farm near Sac City, Iowa. Her father left farming and left Iowa, moving to Pasadena to work in automobile sales. After the move, Hayes gained some training in drama and acted with a stock theater company.

Hayes worked in a San Francisco night club as a hat-check girl and won a regional contest as part of the Gateway to Hollywood radio program before losing in the final round. She signed a long-term contract with RKO Pictures. She appeared in the films The Girl from Mexico, The Spellbinder, Conspiracy, Sued for Libel, Mexican Spitfire, Millionaire Playboy, Millionaires in Prison, I'm Still Alive, Mexican Spitfire Out West, The Saint in Palm Springs, Men of the Timberland, Raiders of the Desert, Citadel of Crime, South of Santa Fe, Romance on the Range and Ridin' Down the Canyon.
