= John Rawlins (director) =

American film editor (1902–1997)

- Born: June 9, 1902; Long Beach, California, U.S.
- Died: May 20, 1997 (aged 94); Arcadia, California, U.S.
- Resting place: Forest Lawn Memorial Park, Glendale
- Occupation: Film director
- Years active: 1932-1958

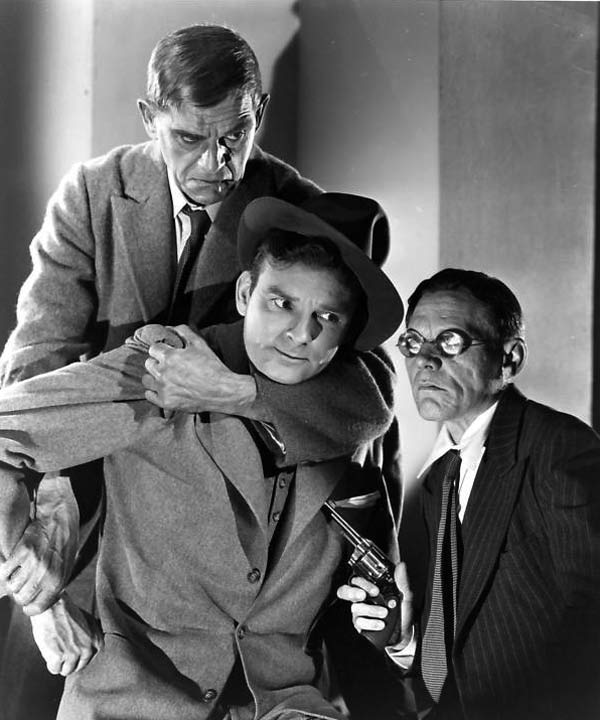
Left to right : Boris Karloff, Ralph Byrd, and Skelton Knaggs in Dick Tracy Meets Gruesome (1947).

John Rawlins (June 9, 1902 – May 20, 1997) was an American film editor and director. He directed 44 films between 1932 and 1958. He was born in Long Beach, California and died in Arcadia, California.

According to one obituary, he was "a prime exponent of that style, being a master of swift exposition and fast action. His no-nonsense approach also made him a fine serial director, and when given the chance of a top-budget adventure film he gave his studio one of its biggest hits in Arabian Nights." Another said he "was a prime example of a no-frills director of Bs, who got his job done quickly, competently and cheaply."

== Biography ==
Rawlins was born in Long Beach, California, in 1902. He started work as a stuntman and bit player in action films and serials. He wrote jokes for comedies, then worked at Columbia as an editor.

In 1933, he made his directing debut with two short films, Sign Please and They're Off!. He directed his first feature in 1938, State Police. According to an obituary, it "instantly established his forte - quickly made, inexpensive "B" movies of around 60 minutes' running time, distinguished by fast pacing and non-stop action. He was signed to a long-term contract by Universal. In 1951 he directed Fort Defiance. In the fifties he left the film business become a property developer.

== Selected filmography ==
- The Tired Business Man (1927, editor)
- Waterfront (1928, editor)
- Love and the Devil (1929, editor)
- The Isle of Lost Ships (1929)
- High Society (1932)
- Lucky Ladies (1932)
- They're Off (1933)
- Shadows of Sing Sing (1933)
- Sign Please (1933)
- Going Straight (1933)
- Above the Clouds (1933)
- Among the Missing (1934, editor)
- The Line-Up (1934, editor)
- Mills of the Gods (1934, editor)
- Name the Woman (1934, editor)
- The Defense Rests (1934, editor)
- Men of the Hour (1935, editor)
- The Girl Friend (1935, editor)
- Devil's Squadron (1936)
- State Police (1938)
- Air Devils (1938)
- Young Fugitives (1938)
- The Missing Guest (1938)
- Junior G-Men (1940)
- The Leather Pushers (1940)
- The Green Hornet Strikes Again! (1941)
- Six Lessons from Madame La Zonga (1941)
- Mr. Dynamite (1941)
- Mutiny in the Arctic (1941)
- Men of the Timberland (1941)
- Raiders of the Desert (1941)
- A Dangerous Game (1941)
- Sea Raiders (1941)
- Bombay Clipper (1942)
- Torpedo Boat (1942)
- Unseen Enemy (1942)
- Mississippi Gambler (1942)
- Sherlock Holmes and the Voice of Terror (1942)
- Half Way to Shanghai (1942)
- Overland Mail (1942)
- The Great Impersonation (1942)
- Arabian Nights (1942)
- We've Never Been Licked (1943)
- Ladies Courageous (1944)
- Sudan (1945)
- Strange Conquest (1946)
- Her Adventurous Night (1946)
- Dick Tracy's Dilemma (1947)
- Dick Tracy Meets Gruesome (1947)
- The Arizona Ranger (1948)
- Michael O'Halloran (1948)
- Massacre River (1949)
- The Boy from Indiana (1950)
- Rogue River (1951)
- Fort Defiance (1951)
- Shark River (1953)
- The Indian Raiders (1956)
- Lost Lagoon (1958)
