= Bombay Clipper =

1941 film by John Rawlins

- Theatrical release poster
- Directed by: John Rawlins
- Written by: Roy Chanslor; Stanley Rubin
- Produced by: Marshall Grant
- Starring: William Gargan; Maria Montez
- Cinematography: Stanley Cortez
- Edited by: Otto Ludwig
- Music by: H. J. Salter
- Production company: Universal Pictures
- Distributed by: UniversalPictures
- Release date: February 6, 1942
- Running time: 60 mins
- Country: United States
- Language: English

Bombay Clipper is a 1942 aviation drama film directed by John Rawlins and starring William Gargan and Irene Hervey. The film features Maria Montez in an early role. Turhan Bey also appears.

The film was based on the exploits of oceanic flyers, flying for Pan American World Airways.

== Plot ==
Foreign correspondent Jim Montgomery (William Gargan) agrees to quit his job when his fiancée Frankie (Irene Hervey) threatens to return home to San Francisco without him, tired of his profession always coming first. He remains in Bombay, India for one more assignment, investigating a report of missing jewels, valued at four million dollars. A mysterious man called Chundra (Turhan Bey) continues to observe him.

With the case still unsolved, Jim and Frankie board a flying boat to Manila, unaware that the gems are aboard. A passenger is mysteriously killed, but not before the jewels are hidden in Frankie's case. George Lewis (Lloyd Corrigan), another passenger, admits to being a courier for the diamonds, saying they are meant to be a gift to a foreign dignitary. Lewis, too, is then killed.

Montgomery encounters the culprit and is in danger of being thrown from the aircraft, but he is rescued by Chundra, who is actually a government agent. Frankie can not blame Jim this time for being in a hurry to get back to work and report the story.

== Cast ==
- William Gargan as Jim Montgomery
- Irene Hervey as Frankie
- Charles Lang as Tex Harper
- Maria Montez as Sonya Dietrich Landers
- Mary Gordon as Abigail McPherson
- Lloyd Corrigan as George Lewis
- Truman Bradley as Dr. Landers
- Turhan Bey as Chundra
- Peter Lynn as Bland
- Riley Hill (credited as Roy Harris) as Steward

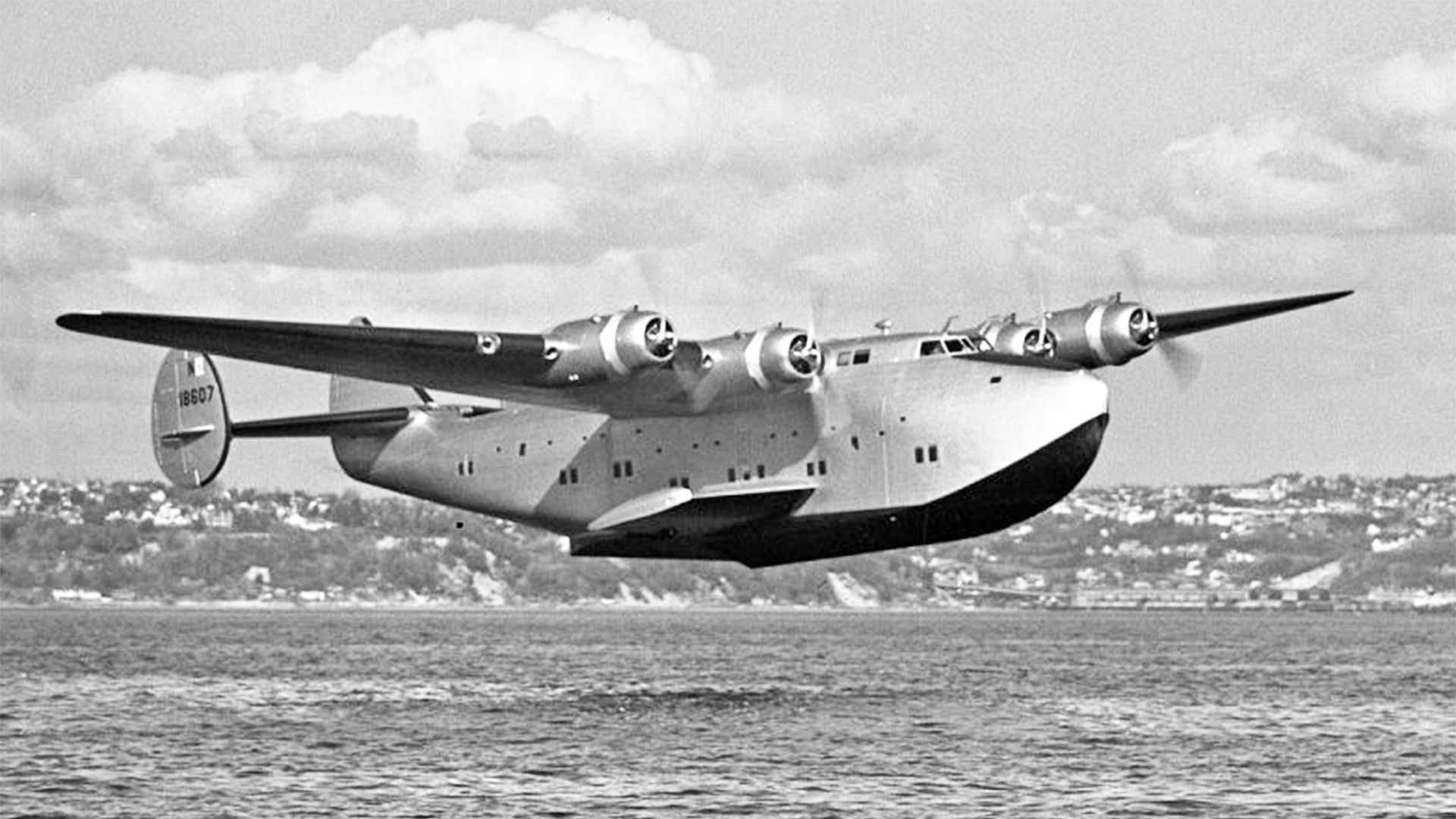
Boeing 314 Clipper.

== Production ==
Universal announced the film in February 1941. Stanley Rubin and Roy Chanslor started writing the script in April.

Filming on Bombay Clipper started in June 1941. Much of the movie was shot on a set made to simulate the Boeing Clipper's interior. (Note: The newer Pan-Am Boeing 314 Clippers were featured in the film's promotion, rather than the company's Sikorsky S-42 flying boats.)

== Reception ==
The Los Angeles Times called the film an "excellent melodrama."

Aviation film historian James M. Farmer in Celluloid Wings: The Impact of Movies on Aviation (1984), indicated that Bombay Clipper was "Low-minded mystery fare." In Aviation in the Cinema (1985), aviation film historian Stephen Pendo considered Bombay Clipper, a "routine" drama that pits reporter, detective and spies against each in solving a murder mystery on a flight across the Pacific Ocean.
