= Black Diamonds (1940 film) =

1940 film, directed by Christy Cabanne

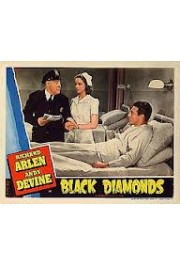
- Lobby card for the film
- Directed by: Christy Cabanne
- Screenplay by: Clarence Upson Young; Sam Robins
- Story by: Sam Robins
- Produced by: Ben Pivar
- Starring: Richard Arlen; Andy Devine; Kathryn Adams
- Cinematography: William A. Sickner
- Edited by: Ted J. Kent
- Music by: H. J. Salter
- Production company: Universal Pictures
- Release date: July 19, 1940 (US)
- Running time: 60 minutes
- Country: United States
- Language: English

Black Diamonds is a 1940 American drama film directed by Christy Cabanne and starring Richard Arlen, Andy Devine, and Kathryn Adams. The film was released on July 19, 1940.

== Plot ==
Walter Norton a reporter for big city newspaper. When he is given the assignment to be the paper's war correspondent, he decides to stop off in his home town before leaving for Europe. While there, Archie Connor, who also works with his father in the local mine, tells Norton that the mine is unsafe. Norton is not sure there is anything he can do, but on the morning he is to leave for Europe, his father is injured in a blast in the mine. Norton postpones his departure, and disguised as a miner, enters the mine to see the conditions for himself. Understanding the dangerous conditions, he attempts to explain the dangers to the other miners and get them to rally to demand that the mine owner improve conditions. However, the workers are fearful that if they complain they will lose their jobs.

Having failed to convince the miners, Norton is resolute on finding another way to improve the mine's safety. However, Connor decides to take matters into his own hands, and plans to rig an explosion in the mine to close the mine down and highlight the unsafe conditions. When Norton hears of the plan, he realizes this will play into the mine owner's hands, and runs to the mine to prevent Connor from carrying out the blast. As the two men struggle, the police arrive and arrest both of them.

While in jail, Norton's sister Nina overhears her boss, Redman, bribing the mining inspector, Mathews, to overlook the mine's safety deficiencies. With the help of Linda Connor, Archie's daughter and Norton's high school girlfriend, they get Norton transferred from the jail to the hospital, where he escapes. Norton and his friend, Barney Tolliver, lure Mathews into the mine, where they threaten to bury him in an explosion unless he comes clean and admits to the bribery and the unsafe conditions. However, Redman learns of the plan, and he sends Johnson, along with several company thugs to stop Mathews from exposing them. Johnson decides that dead men tell no tells, and leaves Norton, Tolliver, and Mathews in the mine, intending to use Norton's explosives to bury the three men in the mine.

What Johnson doesn't know is that Norton's explosives are simply a dummy charge, they were never meant to actually work, simply scare Mathews into confessing. Mathews, upset at the betrayal of Johnson, publicly confesses of the bribery of Redman and of the mine's unsafe working conditions. Redman is arrested and control of mine is taken over by local authorities, who immediately implement better safety measures, while Norton and Linda resume their childhood romance.

== Cast ==
- Richard Arlen as Walter Norton
- Andy Devine as Barney Tolliver
- Kathryn Adams as Linda Connor
- Paul Fix as Matthews
- Mary Treen as Nina Norton
- Cliff Clark as Mr. [Archie] Connor
- Pat Flaherty as Johnson
- Maude Allen as Mrs. Norton
- James Norton as [Joseph] Stacey
- Tom Chatterton as Dr. Lukas

== Production ==
The original screenplay for Black Diamonds, written by Sam Robin, was purchased by Universal in May 1940, and was originally meant to begin production in early April, and was originally scheduled for release on May 10, 1940. It was announced that Arlen and Devine had wrapped production on Hot Steel, and would be immediately beginning on their next picture, Black Diamonds. The film went into production the week of April 30. Production on the project was completed by May 21, 1940. At the beginning of June, the picture was still being edited, and the release date had been pushed back to July 12. By the end of June it had been pushed back an additional week to July 19. The National Legion of Decency gave the film a class A-1 rating, meaning it was unobjectionable for general audiences. The picture opened on July 19, 1940.

== Reception ==
The Film Daily gave the film a mediocre review, stating that the plot lacked suspense and action, but complimenting the acting and the cinematography. Harrison's Reports also gave the picture a lukewarm review, calling it "routine" and less exciting than others of the same genre. Showmen's Trade Review gave the picture a warmer review, calling it "...a fast paced action film that is made to order for the fans who like their entertainment on a cut and dried pattern", stating that it was "...on a par with the best of the Richard Arlen-Andy Devine series". They enjoyed the performances of Arlen, Devine, and Adams.
