= Top Sergeant (film) =

1942 film by Christy Cabanne

- Theatrical poster
- Directed by: Christy Cabanne
- Written by: Larry Rhine, Maxwell Shane, Ben Chapman, Griffin Jay
- Produced by: Ben Pivar
- Starring: Leo Carrillo
- Cinematography: George Robinson
- Edited by: Milton Carruth
- Production company: Universal Pictures
- Distributed by: Universal Pictures
- Release date: June 14, 1942
- Running time: 64 minutes
- Country: United States
- Language: English

Top Sergeant is a 1942 American crime film.

== Plot ==
United States Army Sergeant Rusty Manson is on maneuvers with slackers Frenchy Devereaux and Andy Jarrett when robbers attack them and kill Manson's brother Jack. The man who pulled the trigger, Al Bennett, later joins the army and is assigned to Manson's unit.

== Cast ==
- Don Terry as Sergeant Rusty Manson
- Leo Carrillo as Frenchy Devereaux
- Andy Devine as Andy Jarrett
- Don Porter as Al Bennett
- Gene Garrick as Jack Manson
- Elyse Knox as Helen Gray
- Riley Hill (credited as Roy Harris) as Roy
