= The Kid from Kansas =

1941 film by William Nigh

- Directed by: William Nigh
- Written by: Griffin Jay; David Silverstein
- Produced by: Ben Pivar
- Starring: Leo Carrillo; Dick Foran; Andy Devine
- Cinematography: John W. Boyle
- Edited by: Arthur Hilton
- Music by: Hans J. Salter
- Production company: Universal Pictures
- Distributed by: Universal Pictures
- Release date: September 19, 1941
- Running time: 61 minutes
- Country: United States
- Language: English

The Kid from Kansas is a 1941 American action adventure film directed by William Nigh and starring Leo Carrillo, Dick Foran and Andy Devine. It was produced and distributed by Universal Pictures.

== Plot ==
On a fictional island banana plantation owned by Juan Garcia Pancho, Foreman Andy befriends newcomer Kansas, but Pancho is leery of the stranger. Sabotage and seemingly bad luck befall Pancho and the other island plantation owners, coincidentally at the same time Kansas arrives on the scene. Fruit dealer Lee Walker announces a drop in prices. Before it can be taken to market, Pancho's entire crop is burned by an arsonist, and a plantation worker dies in the fire. The railroad tracks are destroyed and the workers call for a strike. Someone deliberately introduces an imported strain of banana fungus on all the plantations. Pancho is certain Kansas is involved. As things go from bad to worse, it is revealed that the chain of events were engineered by Walker, and that Kansas is a special undercover agent sent to investigate.

== Cast ==
- Leo Carrillo as Juan Garcia Pancho
- Dick Foran as Kansas
- Andy Devine as Andy
- Ann Doran as Julie 'Smitty' Smith
- Marcia Ralston as Linda Walker
- Francis McDonald as Cesar
- James Seay as Lee Walker
- Wade Boteler as Russell
- Leyland Hodgson as Roy York
- Guy Usher as Maloney
- Carmella Cansino as Rosita
- Nestor Paiva as Jamaica
- Antonio Moreno as Chief of Police

== Bibliography ==
- Fetrow, Alan G. Feature Films, 1940-1949: a United States Filmography. McFarland, 1994.
