= Men of the Timberland =

1941 film

- Directed by: Elmer Clifton
- Written by: Paul Jarrico; Maurice Tombragel; Griffin Jay
- Produced by: Ben Pivar
- Starring: Richard Arlen; Andy Devine; Linda Hayes
- Cinematography: John W. Boyle
- Edited by: Milton Carruth
- Music by: Hans J. Salter
- Production company: Universal Pictures
- Distributed by: Universal Pictures
- Release date: June 6, 1941
- Running time: 61 minutes
- Country: United States
- Language: English

Men of the Timberland is a 1941 American action film directed by Elmer Clifton and starring Richard Arlen, Andy Devine and Linda Hayes. It was part of their Aces of Action series at Universal Pictures.

Paul Jarrico worked on the script. He said the film "dealt with the fight Richard Arlen, Andy Devine and some Dead-End-type kids in the Civilian Conservation Corps put up against the timber barons. Premature environmentalism." The script was rewritten, but Jarrico kept story credit. The Los Angeles Times said "Andy Devine is delightful."

== Plot ==
The crooked lumber contractor, Tim MacGregor, schemes to over-harvest a plot of land owned by Eastern socialite Kay Hadley. When informed by forest ranger Jim Dudley that he will not be allowed to harvest as much as he wants, he bribes the ranger to alter his reports. French-Canadian lumberjack Jean Collet learns of a new ranger in town, just as the deal is about to be finalized, and becomes worried that he might upset their plans. The new ranger, Dick O'Hara, points out discrepancies in Dudley's paperwork and previous survey data, and that MacGregor cannot be allowed to log the forest. Panicking, Dudley turns to MacGregor for help but is refused, and is murdered the night before he intends to tell O'Hara what he knows.

Due to Dudley's sudden disappearance, O'Hara asks for the logging to be paused for two weeks, but MacGregor refuses him, and O'Hara threatens to halt all logging in the future. MacGregor hires lumberjack Andy Jenson to log the area is fast as he can, before O'Hara and his fellow rangers can finish their survey and catch him. A ranger is found dead, and O'Hara does not suspect him of the crime but still intends to complete his survey and stop the logging operation. Collet wounds a ranger, who then informs O'Hara that the harvest is almost complete and he must finish his survey by himself. O'Hara is jumped by Collet and other men but his life is saved by Andy Jenson, who has become an ally. Collet burns what he believes are O'Hara's survey charts and stabs the wounded ranger in the back, and O'Hara finds his murdered comrade. Furious, O'Hara tracks down Collet to a local bar and attempts to arrest him, but a fight breaks out and O'Hara's friend Lucky is killed in the action. Vowing revenge, O'Hara recruits Jenson to investigate with him. Armed with evidence against the loggers, Kay hands them O'Hara's notebook just as its owner bursts in to collect it.

All wrongdoers are arrested, and Kay pushes Collet to confess. Collet and MacGregor are convicted of first-degree murder, Andy and Kay open their own lumber business, called The Paul Bunyan Lumber Company.

== Cast ==
- Richard Arlen as Dick O'Hara
- Andy Devine as Andy Jensen
- Linda Hayes as Kay Hadley
- Francis McDonald as Jean Collet
- Willard Robertson as Tim MacGregor
- Paul E. Burns as Lucky
- Gaylord Pendleton as Tex
- Hardie Albright as Jim Dudley
- Riley Hill (credited as Roy Harris) as Withers
- John Ellis as Ranger

== Reception ==
Motion Picture Daily reviewer Vance King gave the film a positive review, praising the scenery and scenes of actual logging operations, calling the film "easily the best" of the Aces of Action series. A press audience was reportedly impressed with the film.

The Film Daily's review was also positive towards the film, saying, "The fans who have followed this series will not be disappointed in this one." The reviewer also praised the screenplay as being "well done."

== Bibliography ==
- Fetrow, Alan G. Feature Films, 1940-1949: a United States Filmography. McFarland, 1994.
