= Edward Curtiss =

American film editor

- Born: July 7, 1898; Los Angeles, California, US
- Died: November 7, 1970 (aged 72); Los Angeles, California, US
- Occupation: Film editor

Edward Curtiss (1898-1970) was an American film editor who worked in Hollywood from the 1920s through the 1960s.

== Biography ==
Curtiss was born in Los Angeles, California, to Frank Curtiss and Mabel West. He got his start in the film industry as a stuntman, and he had an aviator's license. He later transitioned into editing after impressing director Howard Hawks on set; he went on to edit a number of Hawks' films.

== Selected filmography ==
- College Confidential (1960)
- The Mountain Road (1960)
- Ride a Crooked Trail (1958)
- The Thing That Couldn't Die (1958)
- Girls on the Loose (1958)
- Live Fast, Die Young (1958)
- Touch of Evil (1958)
- The Big Beat (1958)
- Man in the Shadow (1957)
- The Kettles on Old MacDonald's Farm (1957)
- The Tattered Dress (1957)
- Mister Cory (1957)
- Gun for a Coward (1957)
- The Unguarded Moment (1956)
- The Creature Walks Among Us (1956)
- Red Sundown (1956)
- The Kettles in the Ozarks (1956)
- Running Wild (1955)
- To Hell and Back (1955)
- Abbott and Costello Meet the Keystone Kops (1955)
- The Yellow Mountain (1954)
- The Black Shield of Falworth (1954)
- Dawn at Socorro (1954)
- Johnny Dark (1954)
- Ride Clear of Diablo (1954)
- All American (1953)
- The Great Sioux Uprising (1953)
- City Beneath the Sea (1953)
- The Mississippi Gambler (1953)
- Sally and Saint Anne (1952)
- Red Ball Express (1952)
- Bronco Buster (1952)
- The Strange Door (1951)
- Cave of Outlaws (1951)
- Little Egypt (1951)
- Comin' Round the Mountain (1951)
- The Prince Who Was a Thief (1951)
- The Fat Man (1951)
- Winchester '73 (1950)
- Outside the Wall (1950)
- The Story of Molly X (1949)
- Abandoned (1949)
- Abbott and Costello Meet the Killer, Boris Karloff (1949)
- Calamity Jane and Sam Bass (1949)
- Illegal Entry (1949)
- The Countess of Monte Cristo (1948)
- Feudin', Fussin' and A-Fightin' (1948)
- Casbah (1948)
- Brute Force (1947)
- Buck Privates Come Home (1947)
- Swell Guy (1946)
- Her Adventurous Night (1946)
- Blonde Alibi (1946)
- Tangier (1946)
- Pillow of Death (1945)
- Shady Lady (1945)
- The Woman in Green (1945)
- Renegades of the Rio Grande (1945)
- Swing Out, Sister (1945)
- Frisco Sal (1945)
- Hi, Beautiful (1944)
- The Singing Sheriff (1944)
- Pardon My Rhythm (1944)
- Week-End Pass (1944)
- Swingtime Johnny (1943)
- Corvette K-225 (1943)
- Good Morning, Judge (1943)
- Frankenstein Meets the Wolf Man (1943)
- Mug Town (1942)
- Strictly in the Groove (1942)
- Sin Town (1942)
- Invisible Agent (1942)
- Almost Married (1942)
- Saboteur (1942)
- Unseen Enemy (1942)
- Paris Calling (1941)
- This Woman Is Mine (1941)
- Law of the Range (1941)
- Mutiny in the Arctic (1941)
- The Lady from Cheyenne (1941)
- Six Lessons from Madame La Zonga (1941)
- Lucky Devils (1941)
- Trail of the Vigilantes (1940)
- Law and Order (1940)
- When the Daltons Rode (1940)
- Hot Steel (1940)
- Ski Patrol (1940)
- Ma! He's Making Eyes at Me (1940)
- My Little Chickadee (1940)
- Tower of London (1939)
- One Hour to Live (1939)
- I Stole a Million (1939)
- Exile Express (1939)
- Secrets of a Nurse (1938)
- Swing That Cheer (1938)
- Freshman Year (1938)
- Come and Get It (1936)
- The Road to Glory (1936)
- Barbary Coast (1935)
- The Mystery of Edwin Drood (1935)
- Strange Wives (1934)
- Great Expectations (1934)
- Romance in the Rain (1934)
- I Give My Love (1934)
- Affairs of a Gentleman (1934)
- Uncertain Lady (1934)
- Today We Live (1933)
- The Bitter Tea of General Yen (1932)
- Scarface (1932)
- The Good Bad Girl (1931)
- The Fighting Sheriff (1931)
- The Criminal Code (1930)
- The Love Trap (1929)
- The Snarl of Hate (1927)
- The Phantom of the Opera (1925)
- The Hunchback of Notre Dame (1923)
