= George Carleton (actor) =

American actor (1885–1950)

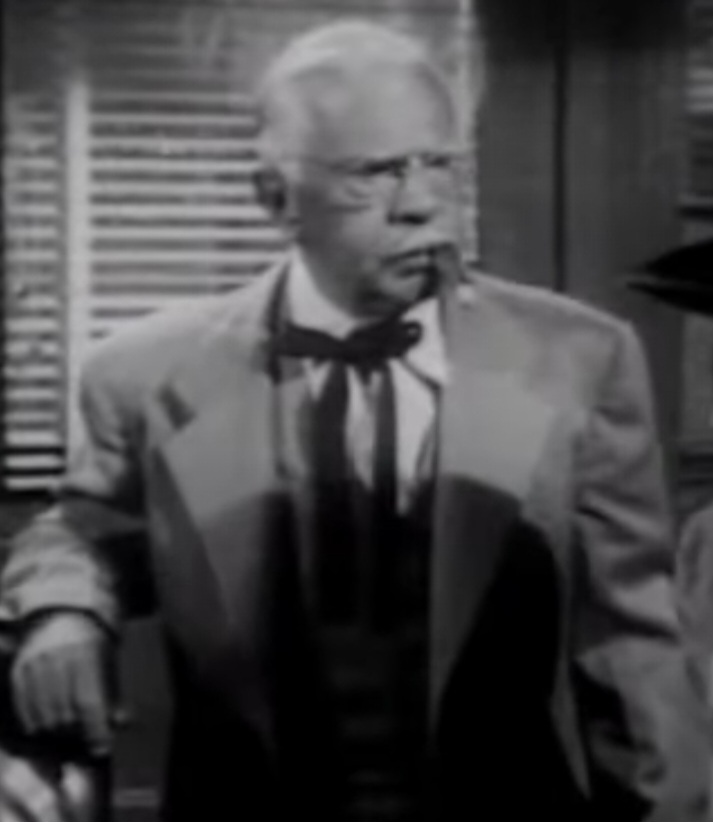
- Carleton in Night Time in Nevada (1948)
- Born: George M. Carleton; October 28, 1885; New York City, U.S.
- Died: September 23, 1950 (aged 64); Hollywood, California, U.S.
- Resting place: Chapel Of The Pines Crematory
- Occupation: Actor
- Years active: 1939–1949

George M. Carleton (October 28, 1885 – September 23, 1950) was an American character actor of the 1940s. He was a stage actor who began a brief career, during which he appeared in over 100 films, including features, film shorts, and film serials.

== Life and career ==
Born on October 28, 1885, in New York City, he began acting on the stage. In 1924 he gave up acting and became manager of the Rivera Theater in Brooklyn. He resumed acting in a 1928 production.

He eventually reached Broadway in the comedy Every Thursday, in which he had one of the leading parts of Thomas Clark. The play ran for several months at the Royale Theatre (now called the Bernard B. Jacobs Theatre), in New York City in 1934. Carleton appeared in several Broadway plays during the 1930s, including successful productions of Kill That Story, which ran for several months at the Booth Theatre in 1934, and as the coroner in the original staging of George Gershwin's Porgy and Bess, which ran from late 1935 to early 1936, starring Anne Wiggins Brown and Todd Duncan.

Carleton made his film debut in the small un-credited role of the judge in 1939's Back Door to Heaven. Over the next 10 years he appeared in over 100 films. Most of his roles were un-credited, but he would occasionally be given a larger, featured part, as in the role of Jones in Raiders of the Desert (1941), or as Judge Robert Walters in the 1942 drama Just Off Broadway, or as General Finney in the 1948 comedy-drama A Foreign Affair. Some notable films in which he appeared include: Michael Curtiz' classic Casablanca, starring Humphrey Bogart and Ingrid Bergman; 1944's romantic comedy, Casanova Brown, starring Gary Cooper and Teresa Wright; in Elia Kazan's film directorial debut, A Tree Grows in Brooklyn (1945), starring James Dunn (who won the Academy Award for Best Supporting Actor), Dorothy McGuire, and Joan Blondell; the 1946 film noir The Blue Dahlia, starring Alan Ladd and Veronica Lake; the 1946 Abbott and Costello comedy The Time of Their Lives; the classic drama Two Years Before the Mast, starring Alan Ladd, Brian Donlevy, William Bendix, and Barry Fitzgerald; the 1948 biopic about Richard Rodgers and Lorenz Hart, Words and Music, starring Tom Drake and Mickey Rooney; and the 1949 comedy Once More, My Darling, starring Robert Montgomery and Ann Blyth. Carleton's final screen performance was in 1949's Malaya, starring Spencer Tracy, James Stewart and Valentina Cortesa.

== Death ==
Carleton died on September 23, 1950, at the age of 64 in Hollywood, California, and was interred at Chapel Of The Pines Crematory in Los Angeles, California.

== Filmography ==
(Per AFI database)

- Federal Fugitives (1941)
- The Get-Away (1941)
- Life Begins for Andy Hardy (1941)
- The People vs. Dr. Kildare (1941)
- Whistling in the Dark (1941)
- Raiders of the Desert (1941)
- Tennessee Johnson (1942)
- Fingers at the Window (1942)
- The Great Gildersleeve (1942)
- Jackass Mail (1942)
- Joe Smith, American (1942)
- Just Off Broadway (1942)
- Kid Glove Killer (1942)
- The Man Who Returned to Life (1942)
- Pacific Rendezvous (1942)
- Twin Beds (1942)
- The Fleet's In (1942)
- Casablanca (1942) as American (uncredited)
- Henry Aldrich Haunts a House (1943)
- Lady Bodyguard (1943)
- Over My Dead Body (1943)
- Gangway for Tomorrow (1943)
- Gildersleeve on Broadway (1943)
- Mission to Moscow (1943)
- Riding High (1943)
- This Land Is Mine (1943)
- Jam Session (1944)
- Henry Aldrich's Little Secret (1944)
- Casanova Brown (1944)
- Mrs. Parkington (1944)
- Practically Yours (1944)
- And Now Tomorrow (1944)
- The Big Bonanza (1944)
- You Can't Ration Love (1944)
- Wilson (1944)
- Duffy's Tavern (1945)
- You Came Along (1945)
- Music for Millions (1945)
- An Angel Comes to Brooklyn (1945)
- Behind City Lights (1945)
- Boston Blackie Booked on Suspicion (1945)
- Conflict (1945)
- Don Juan Quilligan (1945)
- Marshal of Laredo (1945)
- Over 21 (1945)
- Roughly Speaking (1945)
- A Tree Grows in Brooklyn (1945)
- The Vampire's Ghost (1945)
- Affairs of Geraldine (1946)
- The Blue Dahlia (1946)
- Dangerous Millions (1946)
- Home in Oklahoma (1946)
- The Hoodlum Saint (1946)
- Magnificent Doll (1946)
- Rendezvous 24 (1946)
- Sioux City Sue (1946)
- So Goes My Love (1946)
- Song of Arizona (1946)
- Temptation (1946)
- The Time of Their Lives (1946)
- To Each His Own (1946)
- Two Sisters from Boston (1946)
- Miss Susie Slagle's (1946)
- Two Years Before the Mast (1946)
- The Perils of Pauline (1947)
- The Arnelo Affair (1947)
- The Beginning or the End (1947)
- Blaze of Noon (1947)
- Ladies' Man (1947)
- The Last Round-Up (1947)
- Out of the Blue (1947)
- That's My Gal (1947)
- The Trouble with Women (1947)
- A Foreign Affair (1948)
- Mickey (1948)
- Night Time in Nevada (1948)
- The Return of October (1948)
- Smart Woman (1948)
- T-Men (1948)
- Words and Music (1948)
- Hazard (1948)
- You Gotta Stay Happy (1948)
- The Judge Steps Out (1948)
- Daughter of the Jungle (1949) as Vincent Walker
- The Lone Wolf and His Lady (1949) as Managing Editor (uncredited)
- Prince of the Plains (1949) as Sam Phillips
- The Lady Gambles (1949) as MacIlwaine, Poker Player (uncredited)
- Any Number Can Play (1949) as Mr. Kulik (uncredited)
- Calamity Jane and Sam Bass (1949) as Mr. Sherman (uncredited)
- Once More, My Darling (1949) as Mr. Grant
- Port of New York (1949) as Medical Examiner (uncredited)
- Malaya (1949) as Small Man (uncredited)
