= Man from Montreal =

1939 film directed by Christy Cabanne

- Theatrical release poster
- Directed by: Christy Cabanne
- Screenplay by: Owen Francis
- Story by: Ben Pivar
- Produced by: Ben Pivar
- Starring: Richard Arlen; Andy Devine; Kay Sutton
- Cinematography: Milton Krasner
- Edited by: Maurice Wright
- Music by: H. J. Salter
- Production company: Universal Pictures
- Release date: December 8, 1939 (US)
- Running time: 61 minutes
- Country: United States
- Language: English

Man from Montreal is a 1939 American Western film directed by Christy Cabanne. It stars Richard Arlen, Andy Devine, and Kay Sutton, and was released on December 8, 1939.

== Cast ==
- Richard Arlen as Clark Manning
- Andy Devine as Constable "Bones" Blair
- Kay Sutton as Myrna Montgomery
- Anne Gwynne as Doris Blair
- Reed Hadley as Ross Montgomery
- Addison Richards as Captain Owens
- Joe Sawyer as Biff Anders
- Jerry Marlowe as Jim Morris
- Tom Whitten as Brad Owens
- Eddy Waller as Old Jacques
