= Unseen Enemy =

1942 film by John Rawlins

- Directed by: John Rawlins
- Written by: Stanley Rubin, Roy Chanslor
- Based on: An idea by George Wallace Sayre
- Produced by: Marshall Grant
- Starring: Leo Carrillo, Don Terry, Irene Hervey
- Narrated by: Hugh Beaumont
- Cinematography: John W. Boyle
- Edited by: Edward Curtiss
- Distributed by: Universal Pictures
- Release date: 1942
- Running time: 60–61 minutes
- Country: United States
- Language: English

Unseen Enemy is a 1942 American spy thriller film directed by John Rawlins and starring Don Terry.

== Plot ==
A Canadian military intelligence agent tries to uncover a plot to sabotage American ships, while an unscrupulous waterfront club owner sells usage of his club as a rendezvous point for German, Italian and Japanese spies.

== Cast ==
- Irene Hervey as Gin Rand, Nick's stepdaughter
- Don Terry as Capt. William Flynn Hancock, Canadian spy with multiple aliases
- Leo Carrillo as Nick Rand, owner of The Schooner Club
- Andy Devine as Sam Dillon
- Lionel Royce as Capt. Willhelm Roering
- Turhan Bey as Ito
- Clancy Cooper as Police inspector Alan Davies
- Hugh Beaumont as Narrator
