= Road Agent (1941 film) =

1941 film

- Directed by: Charles Lamont
- Written by: Morgan Cox; Arthur Strawn; Maurice Tombragel; Sherman L. Lowe; Arthur St. Claire
- Produced by: Ben Pivar
- Starring: Dick Foran; Andy Devine; Leo Carrillo
- Cinematography: Jerome Ash
- Edited by: Frank Gross
- Music by: Hans J. Salter
- Production company: Universal Pictures
- Distributed by: Universal Pictures
- Release date: December 19, 1941
- Running time: 60 minutes
- Country: United States
- Language: English

Road Agent is a 1941 American western film directed by Charles Lamont and starring Dick Foran, Andy Devine and Leo Carrillo. It was the second in a series of Mexican road pictures. Filming started October 1941. It was produced and distributed by Universal Pictures. Morgan Cox, Arthur Strawn, and Mairice Tombragel co-wrote the screenplay, based on a story by Sherman Lowe and Arthur St. Claire.

== Cast ==
- Dick Foran as Duke Masters
- Leo Carrillo as Pancho
- Andy Devine as Andy
- Anne Gwynne as Patricia Leavitt
- Samuel S. Hinds as Banker Sam Leavitt
- Richard Davies as Tom Martin
- Anne Nagel as Lola
- Morris Ankrum as Big John Morgan
- John Gallaudet as Henchman Steve
- Reed Hadley as Henchman Shayne
- Eddy Waller as Lewis
- Ernie Adams as Jake
- Lew Kelly as Luke
- Luana Walters as Teresa
- Leyland Hodgson as Jackson

== Bibliography ==
- Pitts, Michael R. Western Movies: A Guide to 5,105 Feature Films. McFarland, 2012.
