= Danger on Wheels =

1940 American film noir sport film

- Directed by: Christy Cabanne
- Screenplay by: Maurice Tombragel
- Story by: Ben Pivar
- Produced by: Ben Pivar
- Starring: Richard Arlen; Andy Devine
- Cinematography: Elwood Bredell
- Edited by: Maurice Wright
- Production company: Universal Pictures
- Distributed by: Universal Pictures
- Release date: February 2, 1940
- Running time: 61 minutes
- Country: United States
- Language: English

Danger on Wheels is a 1940 American film noir sport film directed by Christy Cabanne and starring Richard Arlen and Andy Devine.

== Plot ==
A test driver (Richard Arlen) tries racing with his girlfriend's (Peggy Moran) father's new engine.

== Cast ==
- Richard Arlen as Larry Taylor
- Andy Devine as "Gumpy Wesel"
- Peggy Moran as Pat O'Shea
- Vinton Hayworth as Bruce Crowley (billed as Jack Arnold)
- Herbert Corthell as Pop O'Shea
- Sandra King as June Allen
- Landers Stevens as Lloyd B. Allen
- Harry C. Bradley as Jones
- Mary Treen as Esme
- John Holmes as Eddie Dodds
- Jack Rice as Parker
