= North to the Klondike =

1942 film directed by Erle C. Kenton

- Directed by: Erle C. Kenton
- Written by: Clarence Upson Young; Louis Sarecky; George Bricker; William Castle
- Based on: Gold Hunters of the North by Jack London
- Produced by: Paul Malvern
- Starring: Broderick Crawford; Evelyn Ankers; Andy Devine
- Cinematography: Charles Van Enger
- Edited by: Ted J. Kent
- Music by: Frank Skinner
- Production company: Universal Pictures
- Distributed by: Universal Pictures
- Release date: January 23, 1942
- Running time: 60 minutes
- Country: United States
- Language: English

North to the Klondike is a 1942 American Northern adventure film directed by Erle C. Kenton and starring Broderick Crawford, Evelyn Ankers and Andy Devine. The supporting cast features Lon Chaney Jr. in his last film before The Wolf Man, which also stars Ankers, but North to the Klondike was released the year after The Wolf Man.

== Cast ==
- Broderick Crawford as John Thorn
- Evelyn Ankers as Mary Sloan
- Andy Devine as Klondike
- Lon Chaney Jr. as Nate Carson
- Lloyd Corrigan as Doctor Curtis
- Willie Fung as Waterlily
- Keye Luke as K. Wellington Wong
- Stanley Andrews as Jim (Tom) Allen
- Dorothy Granger as Mayme Cassidy
- Monte Blue as Burke
- Riley Hill (credited as Roy Harris) as Ben Sloan
- Paul Dubov as Piety Smith
- Fred Cordova as Indian Joe
- Jeff Corey as Lafe Jordon
