= Lucky Devils (1941 film) =

1941 film by Lew Landers

- Directed by: Lew Landers
- Written by: Alex Gottlieb; Sam Robins
- Produced by: Ben Pivar
- Starring: Andy Devine; Richard Arlen; Janet Shaw
- Cinematography: Charles Van Enger
- Edited by: Edward Curtiss
- Music by: Charles Previn
- Production company: Universal Pictures
- Distributed by: Universal Pictures
- Release date: January 3, 1941
- Running time: 62 minutes
- Country: United States
- Language: English

Lucky Devils is a 1941 American mystery film directed by Lew Landers and starring Andy Devine, Richard Arlen and Janet Shaw. It was produced and released by Hollywood studio Universal Pictures. Maria Montez has a small role.

== Plot ==
A sly pair of newsreel reporters, Dick McManus and Andy Tompkins, who work for the Mercury News Reel Company, has made a profession of photographing stories featuring daredevil acts by ordinary people. One of the exciting places for doing these acts is the Phillips Dam and it's often visible in the two reporters' photos. This fact is used by two foreign saboteurs, R. W. Ritter and Berko. The saboteurs are planning to destroy the dam and have great help from the reporters' footage. At the same time, reporters Dick and Andy are informed by their editor, K. W. Momsen, at the Mercury News Reel Company offices, that they may be held responsible if anything does happen to the dam.

Norma Bishop is a teletypist for the Consolidated News Service and also Dick's go-to girlfriend. She finds out that Dick has used inside information in her possession once again, to photograph the dam. She is upset by this and worries that she may lose her job if word gets out.

Dick and Andy are sent by their editor to photograph the maiden flight of a new and technically groundbreaking robotics airplane, but Dick accidentally sabotages its first voyage when he sneaks aboard the plane and knocks out its radar. After being bailed out of jail, Dick and Andy are told that their recently awarded $1,000 bonus is going toward the plane's repair.

Dick pays a visit to Norma's office, to say hello and perhaps pick up some leads at the same time. During his sneak visit, he finds out that the Duke and Duchess of Vere are arriving incognito by boat to the city. To get an exclusive on the coverage, Dick tricks Norma into leaving her desk, and then he sends out a fake news item that quintuplet colts have been born at a nearby farm. The result is that all the other newsreel reporters go to cover the fake story at the farm, and Dick and Andy cover the royal couple's arrival alone. At the pier, Dick and Andy get involved in the news story by fending off an attempt to assassinate the royal couple and the subsequently become heroes. The two reporters enjoy their success, but the news of their heroics gets out and the fake story sent out from Norma's desk gets her fired. Hoping to get even, Norma sends Dick and Andy out on a fake story of her own, about an airplane pilot. As luck would have it, the two reporters make the news anyway, when they rescue the pilot Gordon Douglas after his plane crashes during an around-the-world flight. Despite her attempt to get even, Dick feels sorry for Norma and manages to get her a new job as a radio announcer.

Saboteurs Ritter and Berko go to the Mercury offices and offer to buy the Phillips Dam footage, but are turned down by the editor. Dick and Andy are out taking live photos and come across a mining disaster where another newsreel reporter has been murdered. After photographing the murder story, Dick and Andy are almost killed themselves by Ritter and Berko when the spies are caught stealing the dam footage. The spies get away though. Dick and Andy find out that F.B.I. agent Chandler is put to investigate a sabotage attempt on the dam. In a desperate attempt to stop the saboteurs from blowing up the dam Dick calls on Norma, who fakes a radio broadcast that the dam has already been blown up. Dick rushes to the dam, while Andy goes to a museum to photograph its model. Having been told that no photos are allowed, Andy instead steals the model by pretending to be a repairman.

As Dick learns that the dam is still intact, Andy accidentally blows up the model while photographing it. That footage is then mistakenly sent to the theaters as "exclusive" footage of the real dam's sabotage. Because of this Dick becomes the laughing stock of the news world. He returns to the radio station, claiming to have footage of the real saboteurs planting explosives at the dam. Bradford, who is Dick's newsreel rival, hires the private detective Aloysius K. Grimshaw to follow Dick on his next story. While driving to Andy's farm, Dick realizes he is being followed, and he and Andy scare off Grimshaw by projecting footage of man-eating lions. Ritter and Berko, pretends to be FBI agents, and pay a visit to Norma at the radio station to learn Dick and Andy's whereabouts. Not seeing through the disguises Norma tells them about Andy's farm, and the fake agents insist she take them there.

Back at the Mercury offices, Momsen is being bombarded with returned newsreels of the fake dam blow-up from angry agencies. Since Dock and Andy have gone underground at Andy's farm, both Chandler and Gwendy Wimple - Andy's clueless airhead of a girl friend - seek Andy. Chandler wants him for the theft of the museum dam model, and Gwendy for breaking his promise to her. Bradford and Grimshaw returns from their horrible experience at the farm, and tells all about the lions. Soon the entire group heads for the farm.

Norma and the two fake agents/saboteurs arrive at the farm, only to learn from Dick that there is no real sabotage footage. Inside the barn, a fight breaks out, and Andy attacks the saboteurs by using model airplanes launched from the hay-loft. The saboteurs are taken care of before the rest of the ensemble arrives, and Ritter and Berko are arrested on the spot by the real agents. Back at the newsreel offices, Norma arrives, having been fired from her broadcasting job. As Andy and Gwendy watch, Dick offers to take Norma "off the air for life" with a marriage proposal.

== Cast ==
- Richard Arlen as Dick McManus
- Andy Devine as Andy Tompkins
- Janet Shaw as Gwendy Whimple
- Jack Arnold as Bradford
- Ralf Harolde as R.W. Ritter
- Dick Terry as Berko
- Dorothy Lovett as Norma Bishop
- Gus Schilling as Aloysius K. Grimshaw
- Tim Ryan as K.W. Momsen
- James Morton as Exposition Guard
- Gladys Blake as Secretary Maggie
- Willam Forest as Chandler
- Maria Montez as bathing beauty being interviewed
- Shemp Howard as drunk pickpocket [uncredited]
