= Escape from Hong Kong =

1942 American comedy film

- Directed by: William Nigh
- Written by: Roy Chanslor
- Produced by: Marshall Grant
- Starring: Leo Carrillo, Marjorie Lord, Andy Devine, Don Terry
- Cinematography: Woody Bredell
- Edited by: Maurice Wright
- Music by: Charles Previn
- Distributed by: Universal Pictures
- Release date: 1942
- Running time: 60 minutes
- Country: United States
- Language: English

Escape from Hong Kong is a 1942 American comedy horror film.

The film revolves around the defense of Hong Kong from the Axis powers during World War II. A British female double agent has information on a secret plan, but her mission is complicated by three vaudevillians who have fallen for her, and by a German spy posing as an officer of the Allies.

== Plot ==
Valerie Hale (Marjorie Lord) is a double agent working for the British, with information on a secret plan for the Allies to help Chiang Kai-shek repel the Axis powers from Hong Kong. She is believed to be the last person to see Col. J. A. Crosley alive and is suspected of his murder. She inadvertently crosses paths with three vaudeville performers Pancho (Leo Carrillo), Blimp (Andy Devine) and Rusty (Don Terry) who fall in love with her. Hale blows her cover by revealing her assignment to the man she believes is Major Colin Reeves (Leyland Hodgson), but is in reality the German spy Von Metz. Pancho, Blimp and Rusty run interference for her and capture the real spies.

== Cast ==
- Leo Carrillo as Pancho
- Marjorie Lord as Valerie Hale, Fraulein K
- Andy Devine as Blimp
- Don Terry as Rusty
- Gilbert Emery as Col. J. A. Crosley
- Leyland Hodgson as Major Colin Reeves aka Von Metz
