= Andy Devine =

American actor (1905–1977)

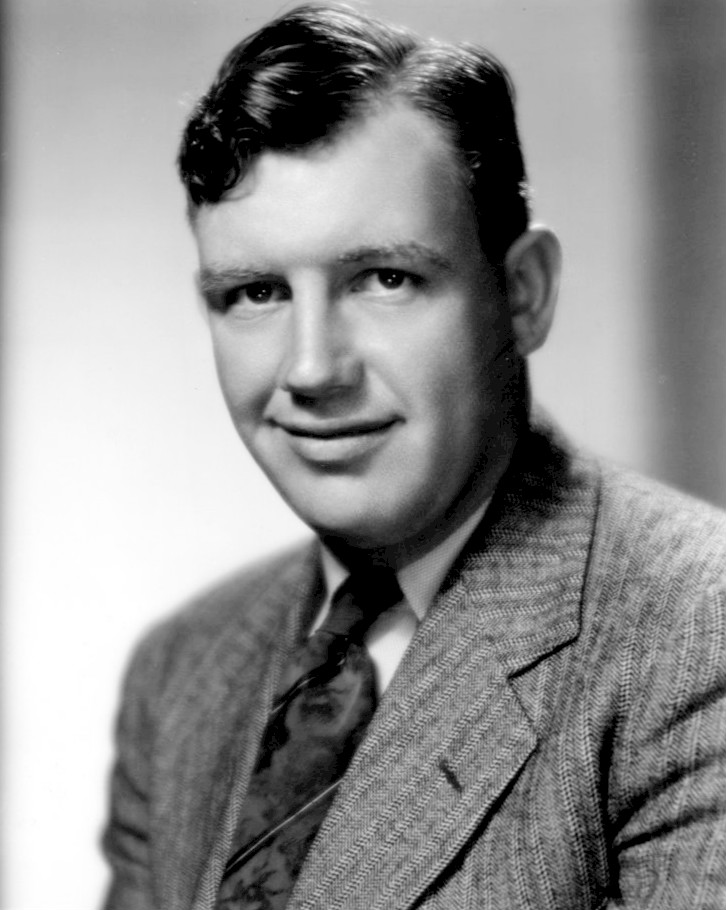
- Devine in 1934
- Born: Andrew Vabre Devine; October 7, 1905; Flagstaff, Territory of Arizona, U.S.
- Died: February 18, 1977 (aged 71); Orange, California, U.S.
- Resting place: 33.60953°N 117.85336°W
- Other name: Jeremiah Schwartz
- Education: Saint Mary's College of California; Northern Arizona University; Santa Clara University
- Occupation: Actor
- Years active: 1932–1977
- Political party: Republican
- Spouse: Dorothy House (m. 1933)
- Children: 2
- Family: James H. Ward (great-grandfather)

Andrew Vabre Devine (October 7, 1905 – February 18, 1977) was an American character actor known for his distinctive raspy, crackly voice and roles in Western films, including his role as Cookie, the sidekick of Roy Rogers in 10 feature films. He also appeared alongside John Wayne in films such as Stagecoach (1939), The Man Who Shot Liberty Valance, and How the West Was Won (both 1962). He is also remembered as Jingles on the TV series The Adventures of Wild Bill Hickok from 1951 to 1958, as Danny McGuire in A Star Is Born (1937), and as the voice of Friar Tuck in the Disney Animation Studio film Robin Hood (1973).

== Early life ==
Devine attended St. Mary's and St. Benedict's College, Northern Arizona State Teacher's College, and was a football player at Santa Clara University. He also played semiprofessional football under the pseudonym Jeremiah Schwartz. His football experience led to his first sizable film role in The Spirit of Notre Dame in 1931.

== Career ==
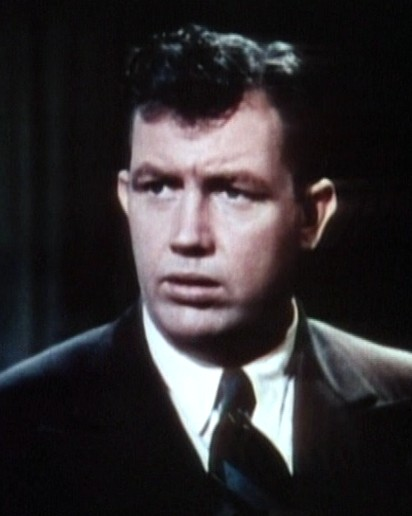
Devine in the film A Star Is Born (1937)

Devine had an ambition to act, so after college, he went to Hollywood, where he worked as a lifeguard at Venice Beach.

His peculiar wheezy voice was first thought likely to prevent him from moving to the talkies, but instead, it became his trademark. Devine claimed that his distinctive voice resulted from a childhood accident in which he fell while running with a curtain rod in his mouth at the Beale Hotel in Kingman, causing the rod to pierce the roof of his mouth. When he was able to speak again, he had a labored, scratchy, duo-tone voice. A biographer, however, indicated that this was one of several stories Devine fabricated about his voice.

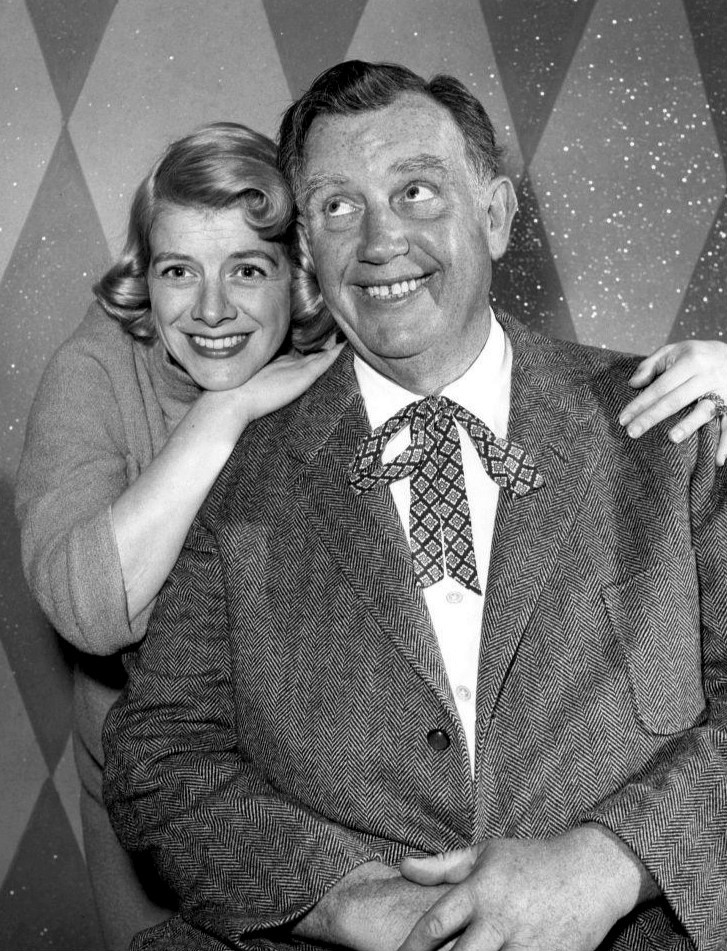
Devine with Rosemary Clooney, 1958

Devine appeared in more than 400 films and shared with Walter Brennan, another character actor, the rare ability to move with ease from B-movie Westerns to mainstream feature films. His notable roles included Cookie, Roy Rogers's sidekick, in 10 films; a role in Romeo and Juliet (1936), and Danny in A Star Is Born (1937). He appeared in several films with John Wayne, including Stagecoach (1939), Island in the Sky (1953), and The Man Who Shot Liberty Valance (1962).

Devine was generally known for his comic roles, but Jack Webb cast him as a police detective in Pete Kelly's Blues (1955).

His film appearances in his later years included roles in Zebra in the Kitchen (1965), The Over-the-Hill Gang (1969), and Myra Breckinridge (1970).

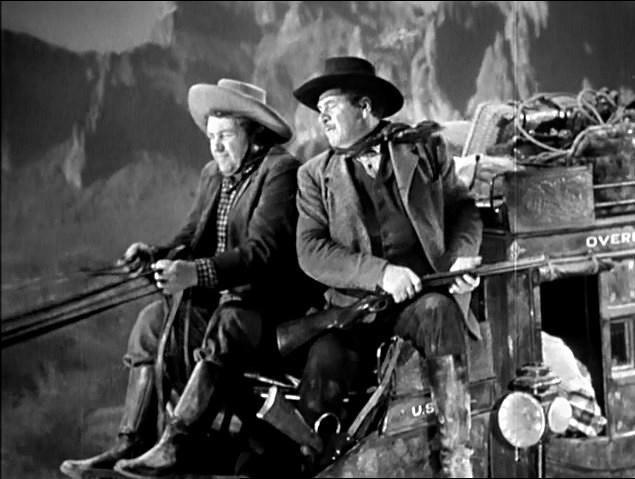
Devine and George Bancroft in Stagecoach (1939)

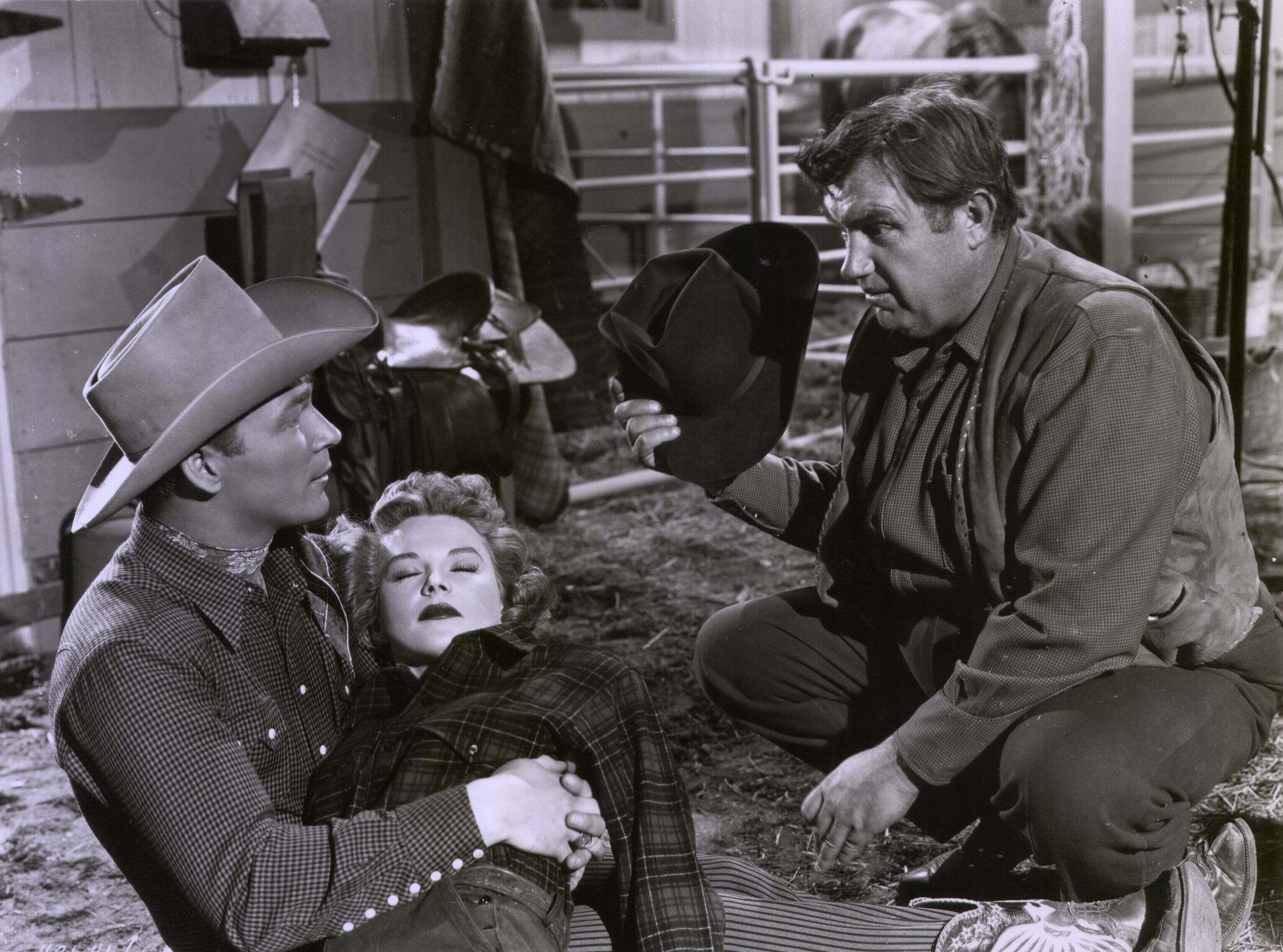
Roy Rogers, Jane Frazee and Devine in Under California Stars (1948)

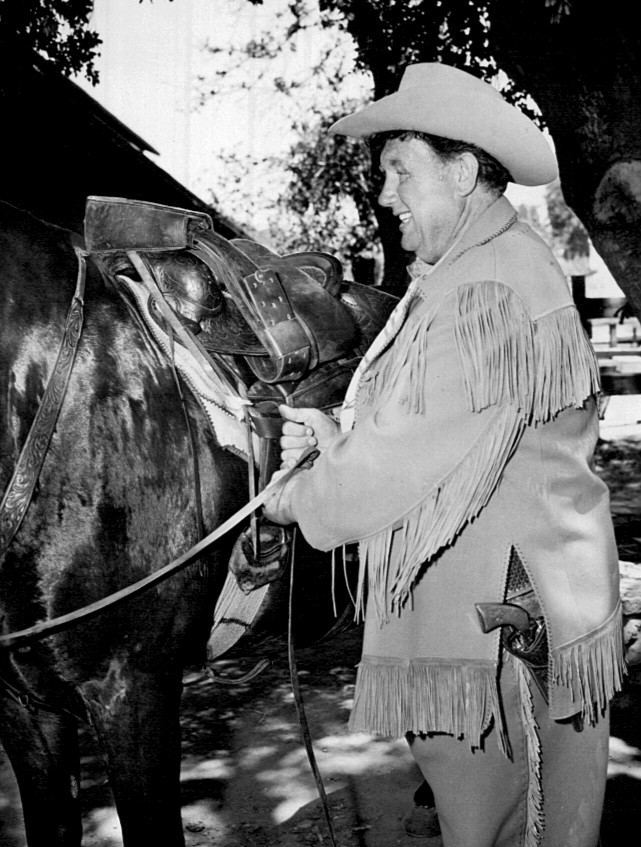
The Adventures of Wild Bill Hickok

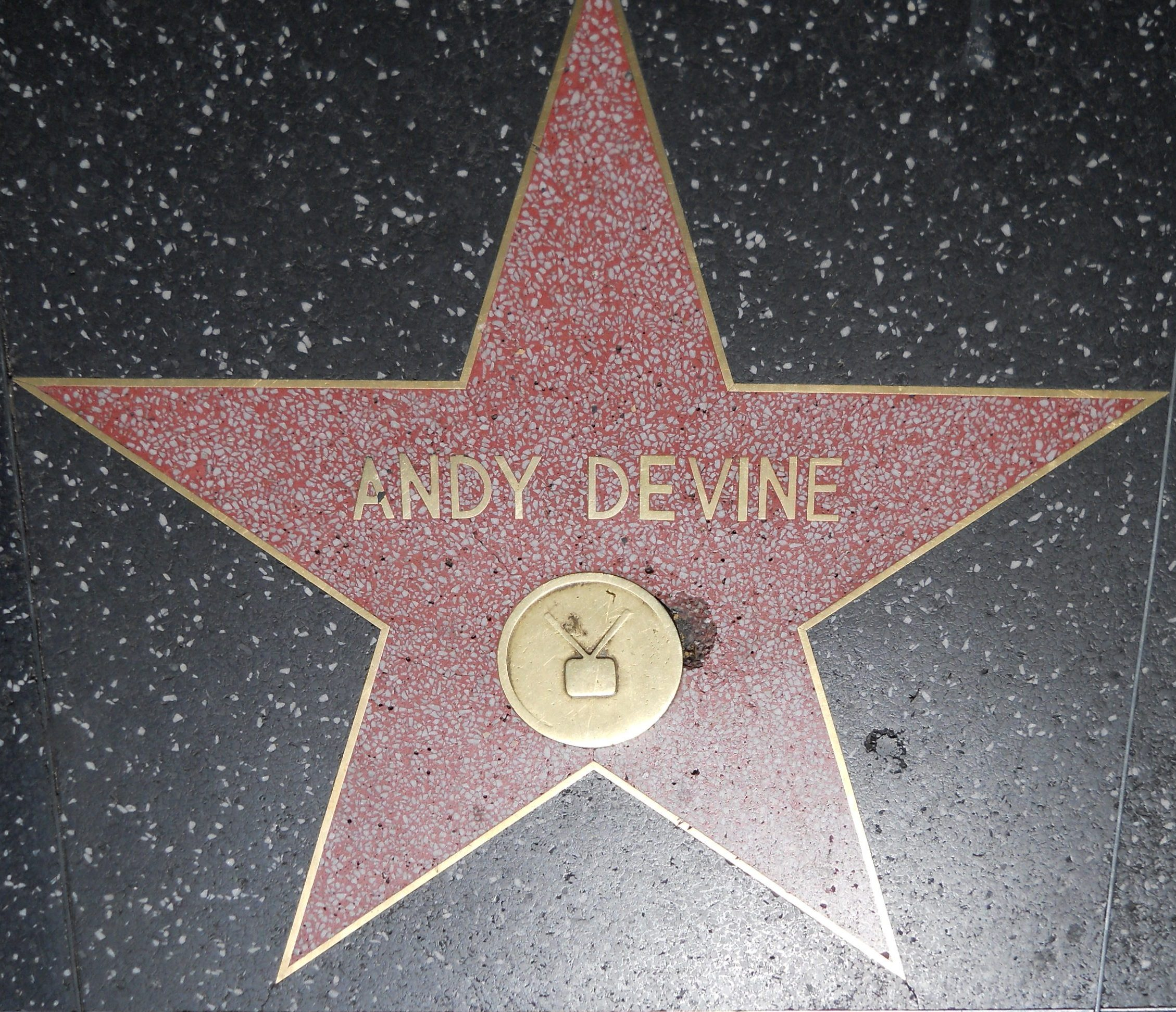
Devine's star on the Hollywood Walk of Fame, 6366 Hollywood Boulevard

Devine worked extensively in radio, and is well remembered for his role as Jingles, Guy Madison's sidekick in The Adventures of Wild Bill Hickok. Devine appeared over 75 times on Jack Benny's radio show between 1936 and 1942, often in Benny's semiregular series of Western sketches, "Buck Benny Rides Again". Benny frequently referred to him as "the mayor of Van Nuys", and Devine served as honorary mayor from 1938 to 1957, when he moved to Newport Beach.

Devine also worked in television. He hosted Andy's Gang, a children's TV show, on NBC from 1955 to 1960. During this time, he also made multiple appearances on NBC's The Ford Show. In addition, he was a guest star on many television shows in the 1950s and 1960s, including an episode of The Twilight Zone titled "Hocus-Pocus and Frisby" and appeared in five episodes of the NBC TV series Flipper in 1964. He played the role of Jake Sloan in the 1961 episode "Big Jake" of the acclaimed anthology series The Barbara Stanwyck Show, also on NBC. He also played Honest John Denton in the episode "A Horse of a Different Cutter" of the short-lived series The Rounders.

He made a cameo appearance as Santa Claus in an episode of the 1960s live-action Batman TV series on ABC. The episode, entitled "The Duo Is Slumming", was originally broadcast on December 22, 1966.

Devine made his stage debut in 1957 with his portrayal of Cap'n Andy in Guy Lombardo's production of Show Boat at the Jones Beach Theatre in Wantagh, New York. In 1973, he went to Monroe, Louisiana, at the request of George C. Brian, an actor and filmmaker who headed the theater department at the University of Louisiana at Monroe, to perform in Show Boat. He also performed voice parts in animated films, including Friar Tuck in Walt Disney's Robin Hood. He provided the voice of Cornelius the Rooster in several TV commercials for Kellogg's Corn Flakes.

== Personal life ==
Devine was a pilot and owned Provo Devine, a flying school that trained flyers for the government during World War II.

Devine was a Republican and supported Barry Goldwater in the 1964 United States presidential election.

== Death ==
Devine died of leukemia at age 71 in Irvine, California, on February 18, 1977.

== Filmography ==
Year	Title	Role	Notes
1926	The Collegians	Student	Short, uncredited
1927	Around the Bases	Calford baseball player	Short, uncredited
1927	The Relay	Sophomore	Short, uncredited
1928	That's My Daddy	Sailor	Uncredited
1928	Finders Keepers	Doughboy and Gate Guard	Uncredited
1928	We Americans	Pat O'Dougal	
1928	Lonesome	Jim's Friend	
1928	Noah's Ark	Extra	Uncredited
1928	Red Lips	Professor Fountain/Sophomore	
1928	Naughty Baby	Joe Cassidy	
1928	The Divine Lady	Extra	Uncredited
1929	Why Be Good?	Young Man at Boiler	Uncredited
1929	Hot Stuff	Bob	
1929	Junior Luck		Short, uncredited
1929	His Lucky Day	Road House Thug	Uncredited
1929	Flying High	Student Admirer	Short, uncredited
1930	Dames Ahoy!	Marine at dance contest	Uncredited
1930	Shooting Straight	Kibitzer	Uncredited
1930	A Soldier's Plaything	Doughboy	Uncredited
1931	The Criminal Code	Cluck	Uncredited
1931	Heroes of the Flames	Fireman	
1931	Danger Island	Briney	
1931	The Spirit of Notre Dame	Truck McCall	
1932	Three Wise Girls	Jimmy Callahan	
1932	Law and Order	Johnny Kinsman	
1932	The Impatient Maiden	Clarence Howe	
1932	Destry Rides Again	Stagecoach Passenger	Scene deleted
1932	Man Wanted	Andy Doyle	
1932	Radio Patrol	Pete Wiley	
1932	Fast Companions	Information Kid	
1932	The Man from Yesterday	Steve Hand	
1932	Tom Brown of Culver	Mac	
1932	The All American	Andy Moran	
1933	The Cohens and Kellys in Trouble	Andy Moran	
1933	Song of the Eagle	Mud	
1933	The Big Cage	Scoops	
1933	Horse Play	Andy	
1933	Midnight Mary	Sam	
1933	Doctor Bull	Larry Ward	
1933	Saturday's Millions	Andy Jones	
1933	Chance at Heaven	Al	
1934	The Poor Rich	Andy	
1934	Upperworld	Oscar	
1934	Stingaree	Howie	
1934	Let's Talk It Over	Gravel	
1934	Million Dollar Ransom	Careful	
1934	Gift of Gab	John P. McDougal	
1934	Wake Up and Dream	Joe Egbert, aka Egghead	
1934	The President Vanishes	Valentine Orcott	
1934	Hell in the Heavens	Sgt. "Ham" Davis	
1935	Straight from the Heart	Edwards	
1935	Hold 'Em Yale	Liverlips	
1935	Chinatown Squad	George Mason	
1935	The Farmer Takes a Wife	Elmer Otway	
1935	Way Down East	Hi Holler	
1935	Fighting Youth	Cy Kipp	
1935	Coronado	Pinky Falls	
1936	Small Town Girl	George Brannan	
1936	Romeo and Juliet	Peter	
1936	Yellowstone	Pay-Day	
1936	The Big Game	Pop Andrews	
1936	Flying Hostess	Joe Williams	
1936	Mysterious Crossing	Carolina	
1937	A Star Is Born	Danny McGuire	
1937	The Road Back	Willy	
1937	Double or Nothing	Half Pint	
1937	You're a Sweetheart	Daisy Day	
1937	In Old Chicago	Pickle Bixby	
1938	Doctor Rhythm	Officer Lawrence O'Roon	
1938	Yellow Jack	Charlie Spill	
1938	Men with Wings	Joe Gibbs	
1938	Personal Secretary	"Snoop" Lewis	
1938	Swing That Cheer	Doc Saunders	
1938	The Storm	Swede Hanzen	
1938	Strange Faces	Hector Hobbs	
1939	Stagecoach	Buck	
1939	The Spirit of Culver	Tubby	
1939	Never Say Die	Henry Munch	
1939	Mutiny on the Blackhawk	Slim Collins	
1939	Tropic Fury	Tynan (Tiny) Andrews	
1939	Legion of Lost Flyers	"Beef" Brumley	
1939	Geronimo	Sneezer	
1939	Man from Montreal	Constable "Bones" Blair	
1940	Danger on Wheels	"Guppy" Wexel	
1940	Little Old New York	Commodore	
1940	Buck Benny Rides Again	Andy	
1940	Torrid Zone	Wally Davis	
1940	Hot Steel	Matt Morrison	
1940	Black Diamonds	Tolliver Higgenbotham	
1940	When the Daltons Rode	Ozark	
1940	Margie		
1940	The Leather Pushers	Andy Adams	
1940	The Devil's Pipeline	Andy Jennings	
1940	Trail of the Vigilantes	Meadows	
1941	Lucky Devils	Andy Tompkins	
1941	Mutiny in the Arctic	Andy Adams	
1941	The Flame of New Orleans	First Sailor	
1941	Men of the Timberland	Andy Jensen	
1941	Raiders of the Desert	Andy "Hammer" McCoy	
1941	A Dangerous Game	Andy McAllister	
1941	Badlands of Dakota	Spearfish	
1941	The Kid from Kansas	Andy	
1941	South of Tahiti	Moose	
1941	Road Agent	Andy	
1942	North to the Klondike	Klondike	
1942	Unseen Enemy	Detective Sam Dillon	
1942	Escape from Hong Kong	Blimp	
1942	Danger in the Pacific	Andy Parker	
1942	Top Sergeant	Andy Jarrett	
1942	Timber	Arizona	
1942	Between Us Girls	Mike Kilinsky	
1942	Sin Town	"Judge" Eustace Vale	
1942	Keeping Fit	Andy	Short
1943	Rhythm of the Islands	Eddie Dolan	
1943	Frontier Badmen	Slim	
1943	Corvette K-225	Walsh	
1943	Crazy House	Andy Devine	
1944	Ali Baba and the Forty Thieves	Abdullah	
1944	Follow the Boys	Himself	Uncredited
1944	Ghost Catchers	Horsehead	
1944	Babes on Swing Street	Joe Costello	
1944	Bowery to Broadway	Father Kelley	
1945	Frisco Sal	Bunny	
1945	Sudan	Nebka	
1945	That's the Spirit	Martin Wilde Sr.	
1945	Frontier Gal	Big Ben	
1946	Canyon Passage	Ben Dance	
1947	The Michigan Kid	Buster	
1947	Bells of San Angelo	Sheriff Cookie Bullfincher	
1947	The Vigilantes Return	Andy	
1947	Springtime in the Sierras	Cookie Bullfincher	
1947	Slave Girl	Ben	
1947	On the Old Spanish Trail	Constable Cookie Bullfincher	
1947	The Fabulous Texan	Elihu Mills	
1948	The Gay Ranchero	Cookie Bullfincher	
1948	Old Los Angeles	Sam Bowie	
1948	Under California Stars	Cookie Bullfincher and Alf Bullfincher	
1948	The Gallant Legion	Windy Hornblower	
1948	Eyes of Texas	Cookie Bullfincher	
1948	Night Time in Nevada	Cookie Bullfincher	
1948	Grand Canyon Trail	Cookie Bullfincher	
1948	The Far Frontier	Judge Cookie Bullfincher	
1949	The Last Bandit	Casey Brown	
1950	The Traveling Saleswoman	Waldo	
1950	Never a Dull Moment	Orvie	
1951	New Mexico	Sergeant Garrity	
1951	The Red Badge of Courage	Cheery Soldier	
1951	Slaughter Trail	Sgt. Macintosh	
1952	Montana Belle	Pete Bivins	
1953	Island in the Sky	Willie Moon	
1954	Thunder Pass	Injun	
1955	Pete Kelly's Blues	George Tenell	
1956	Around the World in 80 Days	First Mate of the 'S.S. Henrietta'	
1960	The Adventures of Huckleberry Finn	Mr. Carmody	
1961	Two Rode Together	Sgt. Darius P. Posey	
1962	The Man Who Shot Liberty Valance	Link Appleyard	
1962	How the West Was Won	Cpl. Peterson	
1963	It's a Mad, Mad, Mad, Mad World	Sheriff of Crockett County	
1965	Zebra in the Kitchen	Branch Hawksbill	
1967	The Ballad of Josie	Judge Tatum	
1968	The Road Hustlers	Sheriff Estep	
1970	The Phynx	Himself	
1970	Myra Breckinridge	Coyote Bill	
1973	Robin Hood	Friar Tuck	
1976	Won Ton Ton, the Dog Who Saved Hollywood	Priest	
1976	A Whale of a Tale	Captain Andy	
1977	Globe of the World	Adam W&S 3	
1977	The Mouse and His Child	Frog	Posthumous release

== Television ==
Year	Title	Role	Notes
1951-1958	The Adventures of Wild Bill Hickok	Deputy Marshal Jingles P. Jones	112 episodes
1955-1960	Andy's Gang	Host	
1959	Wagon Train	Jesse MacAbee	Episode: "The Jess MacAbee Story"
1960	No Place Like Home		TV movie
1962	The Twilight Zone	Frisby	Episode: "Hocus-Pocus and Frisby"
1964-1965	Flipper	Hap Gorman	5 episodes
1966	Batman	Santa Claus	Episode: "The Duo is Slumming"
1967	Shoestring Safari	Colonel Hazeltine	TV movie
1967-1972	The Virginian	Amos Tyke/Dr. Houseman	2 episodes
1968	Bonanza	Roscoe	Episode: "A Girl Named George"
1969	Ride a Northbound Horse	Jim Demmer	2 episodes
1969	Gunsmoke	Jed Whitlow	Episode: "Stryker"
1969	The Over-the-Hill Gang	Judge Amos Polk	TV movie
1970	Smoke	Mr. Stone	TV movie
1970	The Over-the-Hill Gang Rides Again	Amos Polk	TV movie
1972	Alias Smith and Jones	Sheriff Bintell	Episode: "The Men That Corrupted Hadleyburg"
1974	Adventures of Felix Cheng	Adam W&S 3	Episode: "The Wellsworth and Suddery Railway Engines"

== See also ==
- Froggy the Gremlin
- Old Time Radio – Wild Bill Hickok (Andy was Jingles, his sidekick)
