= Hot Steel =

- Theatrical poster
- Directed by: Christy Cabanne
- Screenplay by: Clarence Upson Young
- Story by: Maurice Tombragel
- Produced by: Ben Pivar
- Starring: Richard Arlen; Andy Devine; Peggy Moran
- Cinematography: William A. Sickner
- Edited by: Edward Curtiss
- Music by: Hans J. Salter; Ralph Freed (uncredited); Charles Henderson (uncredited); Charles Previn (uncredited); Hans J. Salter (uncredited); Frank Skinner (uncredited)
- Production company: Universal Pictures
- Distributed by: Universal Pictures
- Release date: May 24, 1940
- Running time: 64 minutes
- Country: United States
- Language: English

Hot Steel is a 1940 American film directed by Christy Cabanne and starring Richard Arlen, Andy Devine, and Peggy Moran.

== Cast ==
- Richard Arlen as Frank Stewart
- Andy Devine as Matt Morrison
- Peggy Moran as Babe Morrison
- Anne Nagel as Rita Martin
- Donald Briggs as George Barnes
- Joe Besser as Siggie Landers
- James Flavin as Storm Swenson
