= Tropic Fury =

1939 film by Christy Cabanne

- Theatrical poster
- Directed by: Christy Cabanne
- Written by: Michael L. Simmons; Maurice Tombragel; Ben Pivar
- Produced by: Ben Pivar
- Starring: Richard Arlen; Andy Devine; Beverly Roberts
- Cinematography: Jerome Ash
- Edited by: Maurice Wright]
- Music by: Charles Previn
- Production company: Universal Pictures
- Distributed by: Universal Pictures
- Release date: September 1, 1939
- Running time: 62 minutes
- Country: United States
- Language: English

Tropic Fury is a 1939 American action film directed by Christy Cabanne and starring Richard Arlen, Andy Devine and Beverly Roberts.

== Cast ==
- Richard Arlen as Dan Burton
- Andy Devine as Tynan (Tiny) Andrews
- Beverly Roberts as Judith Adams
- Louis Merrill as Porthos Scipio
- Lupita Tovar as Maria Scipio
- Samuel S. Hinds as J.P. Waterford
- Charles Trowbridge as Dr. Taylor
- Leonard Mudie as J.T.M. Gallon
- Adia Kuznetzoff as Soledad - Slave-Driver
- Noble Johnson as Hannibal - Slave-Driver
- Frank Mitchell as Amando - Peg-legged Peon
- Milburn Stone as Thomas E. Snell

== Bibliography ==
- Pancho Kohner. Lupita Tovar The Sweetheart of Mexico. Xlibris Corporation, 2011.
