= Legion of Lost Flyers =

1939 film directed by Christy Cabanne

- Film poster
- Directed by: Christy Cabanne
- Written by: Ben Pivar (original story); Maurice Tombragel(screenplay)
- Screenplay by: Maurice Tombragel
- Story by: Ben Pivar
- Produced by: Ben Pivar
- Starring: Richard Arlen; Andy Devine; Anne Nagel
- Cinematography: Jerome Ash
- Edited by: Maurice Wright
- Music by: H. J. Salter
- Production company: Universal Pictures
- Distributed by: Universal Pictures
- Release date: November 3, 1939 (US)
- Running time: 63 minutes
- Country: United States
- Language: English

Legion of Lost Flyers (aka Legion of Lost Fliers) is a 1939 American B movie drama film directed by Christy Cabanne. It stars Richard Arlen, Andy Devine, and Anne Nagel. Legion of Lost Flyers was released by Universal Pictures on November 3, 1939.

== Plot ==
A group of pilots, because of unsavory or unearned reputations, establish an outpost of their own, running charter-flights and hauling supplies in the frozen wastelands of Alaska. Gene "Loop" Gillian (Richard Arlen), Gillian came to Alaska because he has been blamed for a crash where four men where killed. Bill Desert (Theodore Von Eltz), the head of the commercial airlines, refuses to hire him as a pilot, but at the request of aircraft mechanic "Beef" Brumley (Andy Devine), Desert hires Loop as a "grease jockey".

Brumley knows Gillian and does not believe the story about the deaths. Regarded as a coward by the other pilots, Ralph Perry (William Lundigan), Jake Halley (Guinn "Big Boy" Williams) and Smythe (Leon Ames), Gillian claims he is innocent of causing the deaths because it was really Perry who had taken the flight that night. Rumours continue to swirl about the incident.

Perry decides he has had enough and takes off in a stolen aircraft loaded with gold from a local mine. He ends up crashing in the wilderness in a remote canyon, with Gillian, the only one willing to fly to his rescue. After loading Perry on board, the take off ends in the aircraft suffering heavy damage.

On the return flight, the aircraft is falling to pieces. Perry panics and as Gillian nears the airfield, he forces Perry to confess on the radio about his involvement in the men's death. Gillian is reinstated as a pilot and falls in love with Paula (Anne Nagel) who had been the boss's sweetheart.

== Cast ==
- Richard Arlen as Gene "Loop" Gillan
- Andy Devine as "Beef" Brumley
- Anne Nagel as Paula
- William Lundigan as Ralph Perry
- Guinn "Big Boy" Williams as Jake Halley
- Ona Munson as Martha
- Jerry Marlowe as Freddy Sims
- Leon Ames as Smythe
- Theodore Von Eltz as Bill Desert
- Leon Belasco as Frenchy
- Dave Willock as Blinky, the Radioman
- Jack Carson as Larry Barrigan
- Edith Mills as Bertha the Eskimo
- Pat Flaherty as Sam Bradford
- Eddy Waller as Petey

== Production ==
Production dates for principal photography for Legion of Lost Flyers began on July 26, 1939.

The aircraft used in Legion of Lost Flyers was:

- Stearman C3B
- Fleet 1 c/n 374, NC792V
- Fokker F.10
- Travel Air 2000 NC446W (Note: Using a miniature of the Douglas DC-2, the crash at the beginning of the film involves an impossible escape by the pilot from an upper hatch that did not exist on the airliner.)

== Reception ==
Frank Nugent in his film review for The New York Times described the film as "You've seen all this before in your Class "C" dreams: Shacklike hangar, old crates to fly, mountainous terrain, handful of desperate crag-hoppers and so on. But this one has some new features which we'll wager you had never visualized as possibilities: for one, Richard Arlen wasn't the man who violated the code by bailing out of that big transport, leaving his passengers to perish, though how the guilty pilot was substituted in midair is not explained. For another, Mr. Arlen thrice performs the impossible: (1) lands his plane safely in a snow-clogged canyon, (2) takes off again without landing gear in spite of stumps, boulders and underbrush, and (3) after his plane has lost a wing and he himself has been concussively conked by his enemy, who does another bailout, what do you think becomes of Mr. Arlen? Well, sir, the broken plane crashes in a skidding, sickening heap on a convenient modern landing field, with streamlined ambulance service, and Mr. Arlen emerges from the wreckage with nothing worse than a bandage bound picturesquely around his brow."
