= Larry Rhine =

American producer and screenwriter

- Born: May 26, 1910; San Francisco, California, U.S.
- Died: October 27, 2000 (aged 90); Los Angeles, California, U.S.
- Education: University of California, Berkeley
- Occupations: Producer, screenwriter
- Spouse: Hazel Shermet (m. 1950)
- Children: 2

Larry Rhine (May 26, 1910 – October 27, 2000) was an American producer and screenwriter.

== Early life ==
Rhine was born in San Francisco, California to Elias, a real estate broker and Ester, a homemaker. He had a sister, Loretta Rhine. Rhine attended the University of California, Berkeley where he received his Bachelor's degree in 1931.

== Career ==
Rhine started his career as an announcer, writer and producer on KGB radio, working with Art Linkletter. In 1936 he moved on to work as a screenwriter for Universal and 20th Century Fox. He also wrote columns for the newspaper The Californian.

In the 1940s and 1950s Rhine worked on radio programs including The Life of Riley, Private Secretary and Duffy's Tavern, among others.

In the 1960s to 1970s Rhine wrote episodes for television programs including Mister Ed, The Red Skelton Hour, Bachelor Father, The Tom Ewell Show and The Bob Hope Show. In 1963, he was nominated for a Primetime Emmy for Outstanding Writing Achievement in Comedy for his work on The Red Skelton Hour.

From 1975 to 1979 Rhine worked with Mel Tolkin as a writer on 35 episodes of All in the Family. In 1978, he was nominated for another Primetime Emmy for Outstanding Writing in a Comedy Series, sharing the nomination with Tolkin and screenwriter Erik Tarloff. Rhine and Tolkin also won a Humanitas Prize for the 30 Minute category.

In the 1980s Rhine and Tolkin wrote an episode for Archie Bunker's Place and created the short-lived television series Joe's World, which starred Ramon Bieri. Rhine retired in 1987.

== Death ==
Rhine died in October 2000 of natural causes at his home in Los Angeles, California, at the age of 90.
