= The Vinegar Tree =

1930 play by Paul Osborn

The Vinegar Tree is an early play by the American playwright Paul Osborn. It is a light comedy of manners and opened in 1930 at the Playhouse in New York starring Mary Boland and Warren William. In the review from the New York Times, Brooks Atkinson called Mary Boland's performance "a great treat for an audience that laughed until it burst its stays at The Playhouse last evening." The Vinegar Tree was revived successfully at the York Theater in 1988 with Frances Cuka. Clive Barnes remarked in his review, "The misunderstandings are all very well understood, but what gives Osborn's play its finesse and glitter is the neatness of its writing and the sheer style of its construction as well as the observation and comic insight Osborn brings to his characters" The Vinegar Tree was made into a movie called Should Ladies Behave? in 1933 with Alice Brady, Lionel Barrymore, Conway Tearle, Katherine Alexander, Mary Carlisle, William Janney, Halliwell Hobbes. The screenwriters were Bella and Samuel Spewack and the director was Harry Beaumont.
