= Should Ladies Behave =

1933 film by Harry Beaumont

- Directed by: Harry Beaumont
- Screenplay by: Bella Spewack; Sam Spewack
- Based on: The Vinegar Tree; 1930 play by Paul Osborn
- Produced by: Lawrence Weingarten
- Starring: Lionel Barrymore; Alice Brady; Conway Tearle; Katharine Alexander; Mary Carlisle
- Cinematography: Ted Tetzlaff
- Edited by: Hugh Wynn
- Music by: William Axt
- Production company: Metro-Goldwyn-Mayer
- Distributed by: Loew's Inc.
- Release date: December 1, 1933
- Running time: 87 minutes
- Country: United States
- Language: English

Should Ladies Behave is a 1933 American pre-Code comedy film directed by Harry Beaumont and written by Bella Spewack and Sam Spewack, adapted from the play The Vinegar Tree by Paul Osborn. The film stars Lionel Barrymore, Alice Brady, Conway Tearle, Katharine Alexander and Mary Carlisle. The film was released on December 1, 1933, by Metro-Goldwyn-Mayer.

The film is a wacky and enjoyable farce with a light-hearted take on being young and growing older while trying to make it all work out. A grouchy and anti-social mature man (Lionel Barrymore) and his younger and more carefree but miserable wife (Alice Brady) welcome her old friend for a reunion of types. Along for the ride is the naive but blossoming daughter who is anxious for love and worldliness. Her mother's snarky sister is there as well, along with her own expectations. Comedic and heartfelt moments arise as the stories unveil.

== Cast ==
- Lionel Barrymore as Augustus Merrick
- Alice Brady as Laura Merrick
- Conway Tearle as Max Lawrence
- Katharine Alexander as Mrs. Winifred Lamont
- Mary Carlisle as Leone Merrick
- William Janney as Geoffrey Cole
- Halliwell Hobbes as Louis
