= The Royal Bed =

1931 film

- Film poster
- Directed by: Lowell Sherman; F. Harmon Weight (assistant)
- Written by: J. Walter Ruben
- Based on: The Queen's Husband by Robert E. Sherwood
- Produced by: William LeBaron; Henry Hobart(associate producer)
- Starring: Lowell Sherman; Mary Astor; Anthony Bushell
- Cinematography: Leo Tover
- Edited by: Arthur Roberts
- Distributed by: RKO Pictures
- Release date: January 15, 1931 (US)
- Running time: 72-73 minutes
- Country: United States
- Language: English

The Royal Bed is a 1931 American pre-Code satirical comedy film produced by William LeBaron and distributed through RKO. The film was directed by and starred Lowell Sherman, along with Mary Astor and Anthony Bushell. The screenplay was adapted by J. Walter Ruben based on the 1928 play by Robert E. Sherwood titled The Queen's Husband. It would be one of a handful of RKO pictures which was produced in both English and French language versions.

== Plot ==
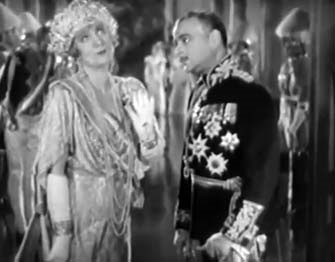
Nance O'Neill and Lowell Sherman

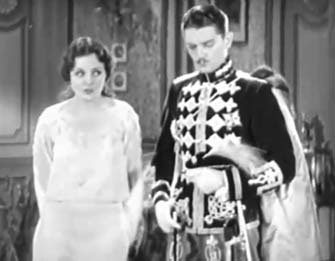
Mary Astor and Hugh Trevor

Princess Anne plans to run away with Freddie Granton, the commoner secretary of her father, King Eric VIII, once her domineering mother, Queen Martha, has left for a vacation in America. Anne is therefore aghast when the Marquis of Birten brings news that he has negotiated her political marriage to Prince William of Grec, a man she has never even met. Dismissing Anne's vehement protests, the Queen is delighted, a feeling not shared by Anne's loving but ineffectual father.

Meanwhile, the Premier and General Northrup warn that a revolution is brewing. He wishes to execute large numbers of political prisoners, but cannot without the King's signature. The Queen wholeheartedly approves of these stern measures. The King promises to attend to it, but after Northrup and the Queen leave, he orders his secretary to misplace the death warrants. Led by Laker, the rebels rise up after Northrup gets Parliament to grant him dictatorial powers. Anne seizes the opportunity to try to flee with Granton, with her father's approval. However, when she believes that the King is in real danger, she refuses to leave him.

Doctor Fellman, a moderate rebel leader, comes to see the King to demand his abdication, but agrees to stop the fighting in favor of negotiation. Then Northrup insists he is in charge now and laughs in derision when the King claims the people are stronger than Northrup's army and navy. Next to arrive is Prince William. Despite his admission that he dislikes Anne, he is prepared to do his duty and go through with the wedding. Then Fellman and Laker show up. The King surprises Northrup by dismissing him from his service and putting Fellman in charge, ordering him to set up general elections as soon as possible.

The Queen, newly returned from America with a much-needed loan, tells her husband in private that she knew the whole revolution was a bluff to force Northrup from power. The King has one last deception planned (of which she is unaware). After she leaves for the wedding, he has Granton brought to him. He speedily marries Anne and Granton and sends them on their way to "exile" in France.

== Cast ==
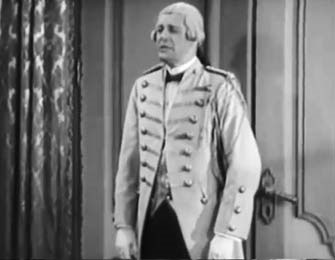
Gilbert Emery

- Lowell Sherman as King Eric VIII
- Mary Astor as Princess Anne
- Anthony Bushell as Freddie Granton
- Hugh Trevor as Crown Prince William of Grec
- Nance O'Neil as Queen Martha
- Robert Warwick as Premier and General Northrup
- Gilbert Emery as Phipps
- Alan Roscoe as Marquis of Birten
- Frederick Burt as Doctor Fellman
- Carrol Naish as Laker
- Desmond Roberts as Major Blent
- Nancy Lee Blaine as Lady in Waiting
- Lita Chevret as Lady in Waiting

(Cast list as per AFI database)

== Production ==
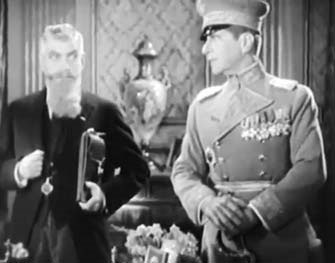
Alan Roscoe and Robert Warwick

In September 1930, it was announced that RKO would be producing The Queen's Husband, a successful Broadway play by Robert E. Sherwood (although The Film Daily incorrectly attributed the play to Noël Coward), and disclosed that Sherman would direct and star in the project. William LeBaron, head of production for RKO Radio Pictures, had purchased the rights to Sherwood's play during his trip to New York in early September. Later in the month, Emery's involvement in the film was announced in "an important role".

In early October, Nance O'Neil's attachment in the role of the Queen was reported, with Mary Astor's involvement as the Princess announced the week later. Robert Warwick was loaned from Fox, who pulled him out of the cast of Once a Sinner prior to production, to play the role of Northrup on October 15.

In mid-October, it was reported that United Artists would handle the distribution of the French version of the film, in French-speaking countries. Using an all-French cast, that version was scheduled for release on November 30. The complete cast for the French version, being shot at the RKO lot in Hollywood, was announced at the beginning of November.

On October 21 the final cast was announced, as well as J. Walter Ruben as the writer in charge of the screenplay adaptation, and Arthur Roberts signed on as the editor. The film was already in production by this time at RKO's studio in Hollywood.

In November 1930 it trade paper accounts announced that the name of the film was being changed from The Queen's Husband to The Royal Bed.

== Reception ==
Photoplay complimented the plot, dialogue and acting, calling it a "fine talkie," while The Modern Screen Magazine said it was "... an amusing story ...". The Film Daily lauded the directing and the acting, stating that the film was an "Excellent satirical comedy", and said "The subtle but sure-fire humor of Lowell Sherman and the superb acting of Nance O'Neil are the outstanding features of this fine production". The magazine also complimented the French version of the play. Motion Picture Magazine liked the picture, calling it "Clever Satire - Cleverly Done", and they especially enjoyed Sherman's acting.

Jack Grant of Motion Picture News gave the film high praise, titling it "Delightful Sophistry". He complimented the entire cast saying that it "... could hardly be improved upon", singling out the performances of Astor, Sherman, O'Neil, Warwick, and Emery. Grant also enjoyed Sherman's direction. Overall he described the picture "As simon-pure entertainment for intelligent audiences this talker has few equals in this class."

== Notes ==
The Royal Bed was also produced by LeBaron in a French-language version entitled Echec Au Roi, directed by Léon D'Usseau and Henri de la Falaise, with a translation of Ruben's screenplay into the French language by Robert Harari. Leo Tover was the cinematographer on this film as well, which starred Françoise Rosay, Pauline Garon and Emile Chautard. At both the Los Angeles and Chicago screenings, the film was titled, Le Roi s'Ennuie.

The play on which this film is based, The Queen's Husband by Robert E. Sherwood, was performed at the Playhouse Theatre in New York City from January through May 1928. It was produced by William A. Brady and Dwight Deere Wiman and directed by John Cromwell. It starred Roland Young as King Eric, Gladys Hanson as The Queen, Katherine Alexander as Princess Anne, and Gyles Isham as Freddie Granton. A one-hour radio adaptation of the play was presented on Lux Radio Theatre on December 30, 1935, featuring Frank Morgan. Gladys Hanson reprised her role as Queen Martha.

In 1958, the film entered the public domain in the United States because the claimants did not renew its copyright registration in the 28th year after publication.
