= Girls' Town =

- Film poster
- Directed by: Victor Halperin
- Written by: Gene Kerr; Victor McLeod
- Produced by: Lou Brock; Jack Schwarz
- Starring: Edith Fellows; June Storey; Alice White
- Cinematography: Arthur Reed
- Edited by: Martin G. Cohn
- Music by: Lee Zahler
- Production company: Jack Schwarz Productions
- Distributed by: Producers Releasing Corporation
- Release date: March 6, 1942
- Running time: 68 minutes
- Country: United States
- Language: English

Girls' Town is a 1942 American drama film directed by Victor Halperin and starring Edith Fellows, June Storey and Alice White.

== Plot ==
The winner of a Midwest beauty contest receives a screen test in Hollywood and takes her sister along, lodging in a boarding house.

== Cast ==
- Edith Fellows as Sue Norman
- June Storey as Myra Norman
- Kenneth Howell as Kenny Lane
- Alice White as Nicky
- Anna Q. Nilsson as Mother Lorraine
- Warren Hymer as Joe
- Vince Barnett as Dimitri
- Paul Dubov as Lionel Fontaine
- Peggy Ryan as Penny
- Helene Stanley as Sally
- Helen McCloud as Mayor
- Cara Williams as Ethel
- Charles Williams as Coffer

== Bibliography ==
- Fetrow, Alan G. Feature Films, 1940-1949: a United States Filmography. McFarland, 1994.
