= Saboteur (film) =

1942 film by Alfred Hitchcock

- Theatrical poster
- Directed by: Alfred Hitchcock
- Written by: Peter Viertel; Joan Harrison; Dorothy Parker
- Produced by: Frank Lloyd; Jack H. Skirball
- Starring: Priscilla Lane; Robert Cummings; Norman Lloyd; Otto Kruger; Alan Baxter; Alma Kruger; Dorothy Peterson; Clem Bevans
- Cinematography: Joseph A. Valentine
- Edited by: Otto Ludwig
- Music by: Frank Skinner
- Production companies: Frank Lloyd Productions; David O. Selznick Productions
- Distributed by: Universal Pictures
- Release date: April 22, 1942
- Running time: 109 minutes
- Country: United States
- Language: English
- Budget: $780,000
- Box office: $1,250,000 (US rentals)

Saboteur is a 1942 American spy thriller film directed by Alfred Hitchcock with a screenplay written by Peter Viertel, Joan Harrison and Dorothy Parker. The film stars Robert Cummings, Priscilla Lane and Norman Lloyd.

== Plot ==
Aircraft factory worker Barry Kane wrongly falls under suspicion of setting fire to his Glendale, California manufacturing plant during World War II, an act of domestic sabotage. Kane believes the actual culprit to be an apparent employee, Fry, whom he encountered earlier. When no one by that name is found to have worked there, Kane becomes the target of a manhunt. He remembers an address from an envelope carried by Fry and hitches a truck ride to a huge ranch in the desert. Kane discovers that the ranch's owner, Charles Tobin, is secretly collaborating with a group of saboteurs that includes Fry.

Kane escapes and takes refuge with a blind man and his niece, Patricia Martin. She believes Kane is guilty and attempts to turn him in to the police, but Kane kidnaps Martin and travels east in search of Fry. They stow away on a circus caravan and eventually reach the ghost town being used as an outpost by Tobin's spy ring. Kane successfully poses as an accomplice and infiltrates the group, who is next planning to sabotage the launch of a new battleship at the Brooklyn Navy Yard. Martin goes to the local sheriff, but he turns out to be in league with Tobin as well. Kane accompanies the saboteurs to New York, where they regroup at the mansion of a rich philanthropist and Nazi sympathizer, Mrs. Sutton. Tobin arrives and denounces Kane. Kane is locked in the Sutton basement, and Martin is imprisoned in an office high up Rockefeller Center. She drops a note out of the window, and the cab drivers who find it alert the FBI to rescue her.

Kane escapes the Sutton mansion by triggering a fire alarm and rushes to the Navy Yard. He finds Fry preparing to blow up the battleship and attempts to overpower him. By the time Fry detonates the bomb, the ship is already launched and safe. Fry takes Kane prisoner and returns to the Rockefeller Center office to find the authorities waiting. Fry flees, terrorizing a movie audience at Radio City Music Hall at gunpoint, and eventually taking the ferry to the Statue of Liberty. Kane pursues Fry onto Lady Liberty's torch. Fry accidentally falls over the platform's railing and clings to the statue's hand. Kane tries to rescue him, but as the police and FBI arrive, Fry falls to his death.

== Cast ==
- Robert Cummings as Barry Kane
- Priscilla Lane as Patricia "Pat" Martin
- Otto Kruger as Charles Tobin
- Alan Baxter as Freeman
- Clem Bevans as Neilson
- Norman Lloyd as Frank Fry
- Alma Kruger as Mrs. Sutton
- Vaughan Glaser as Uncle Phillip Martin (as Vaughan Glazer)
- Dorothy Peterson as Mrs. Mason
- Ian Wolfe as Robert
- Frances Carson as Society Woman
- Murray Alper as Truck Driver
- Kathryn Adams as Mrs. Brown (Tobin's daughter)
- Pedro de Cordoba as Bones - Circus Troupe
- Billy Curtis as Major / Midget - Circus Troupe
- Marie LeDeaux as Titania the Fat Woman - Circus Troupe (as Matie Ke Deaux)
- Anita Sharp-Bolster as Esmeralda - Circus Troupe (as Anita Bloster)
- Jean Romer as Siamese Twins (as Jeanne Romer)
- Laura Mason as Siamese Twins (as Lynn Romer)

== Production ==
The pivotal and controversial scene in Saboteur featured the SS Normandie.

=== Development ===
Hitchcock was under contract to David O. Selznick, so he first pitched the idea for the film to him; Selznick gave the okay for a script to be written, assigning John Houseman to keep an eye on its progress and direction. Val Lewton, Selznick's story editor, eventually rejected the script, which reviewer Leonard Maltin later called "extremely offbeat," so Selznick forced Hitchcock to offer it to other studios, "causing ill feelings between the producer and his director since it not only showed a lack of belief in Hitchcock's abilities, but also because the terms of Hitchcock's contract would net Selznick a three-hundred percent profit on the sale."

Universal signed on, but Hitchcock could not have the two actors he wanted for the leading roles. Gary Cooper was uninterested in the project and Barbara Stanwyck had other commitments. He settled on Robert Cummings who had a new contract with Universal, while Priscilla Lane was borrowed from Warner Bros. although her scenes had to wait while she finished Arsenic and Old Lace, a production that was eventually shelved until its 1944 release.

In November 1941, Universal announced that Hitchcock would make the film for the studio, and it would be produced by Frank Lloyd and Jack Skirball. Cummings and Lane were to star. Hitchcock later said he was "lucky" to have "young players who are intelligent and sensitive to direction" and "players who are unmistakeably young American. It was easy to bring out the familiar qualities to make Bob seem the loveable boy at the next lathe or around the corner. In Priscilla, too, I had the resolute and daring attributes typical of American girlhood. I wanted the boy and girl in Saboteur to suggest the thrilling importance of unimportant people, to forget they were movie stars, to remember only that they were free and in terrible danger."

Universal did bring in Dorothy Parker to write a few scenes, "mostly the patriotic speeches given by the hero." Although Parker had been brought in to "punch up the dialogue", Hitchcock also called in Peter Viertel to continue to work on the script. (Note: Production on the film began less than two weeks after the attack on Pearl Harbor.)

Hitchcock described the film as a series of "cameos" like The 39 Steps. It was originally meant to finish with a climax at the movie theatre which was showing Abbott and Costello's film Ride 'Em Cowboy. According to The New York Times "the studio feels that the booking will materially enhance the prestige of the comedians." However, that film was not used in the final movie.

=== Shooting ===
Filming took place from December 1941 to February 1942.

Hitchcock used extensive location footage in the film, which was unusual for Hollywood productions at the time. Second unit director Vernon Keays and cinematographer Charles Van Enger shot exteriors in the Alabama Hills of Lone Pine, California, and John P. Fulton shot the background footage in New York City. For the New York City footage, special long lenses were used to shoot from great distances. One background shot shows a capsized ship in the harbor. Fry glances at it and smiles knowingly. The ship shown is the former SS Normandie, which burned and sank in February 1942, leading to rumors of German sabotage.

There was clever matching of the location footage with studio shots, many using matte paintings for background, for example, in shots of the western ghost town, "Soda City". The famed Statue of Liberty sequence takes place on the torch platform, which had actually been closed to public access since the Black Tom sabotage in 1916. A mock-up built for filming accurately depicted this part of the statue. The scene also used innovative visual effects. In particular, Lloyd lay on his side on a black saddle on a black floor while the camera was moved from close-up to 40 feet above him, making him appear to drop downward, away from the camera. Film taken from the top of the Statue was then superimposed onto the black background.

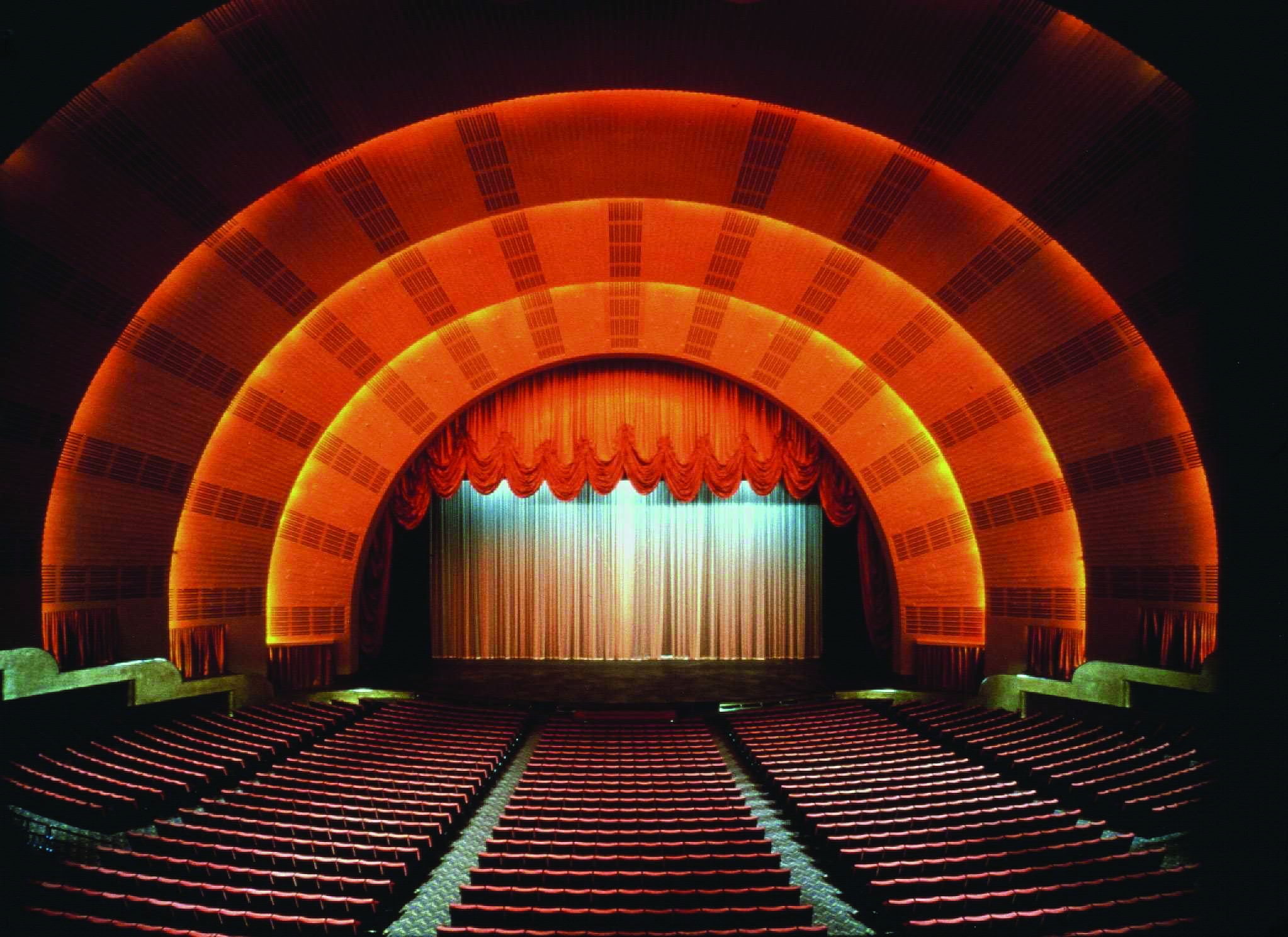
Location of the Radio City Music Hall scene

There was no music scored for the film's climactic Statue of Liberty scene or the Radio City sequence; instead, Hitchcock let these scenes carry on their own. For example, in the Radio City scene, Hitchcock combined action shown on the theater screen (including gunshots) with the action in the theater. The contrast of the large screen images with the shootout below encompassed the audience into the action and was one of the more effective scenes in Saboteur.

Hitchcock makes his trademark cameo appearance about an hour into the film (1:04:37), standing at a kiosk in front of Cut Rate Drugs in New York as the saboteurs' car pulls up. In his book-length interview with François Truffaut (Simon & Schuster, 1967), Hitchcock says he and Parker filmed a cameo showing them as the elderly couple who see Cummings and Lane hitchhiking and drive away, but that he decided to change that shot to the existing cameo.

Scripting, pre-production, and principal photography on Saboteur wrapped in 15 weeks, the fastest Hitchcock had ever worked. By January 1942, the film was in post-production. Early in April, Saboteur was "redflagged" by officials in the War Office who had concerns about the scene involving the SS Normandie (renamed USS Lafayette). Regarding this scene, Hitchcock said: "the Navy raised hell with Universal about these shots because I implied that the Normandie had been sabotaged, which was a reflection on their lack of vigilance in guarding it." Despite the official objections, the scene remained in the final film. Saboteur was premiered in Washington, D.C., on April 22, 1942, with Hitchcock, Cummings and Lane, along with 80 U.S. Senators and 350 U.S. Congressmen, in attendance.

=== Costume design ===
When the US War Production Board issued guidelines for clothing rationing in 1942 (General Limitation Order L-85), the board invited Hollywood designers, including Travis Banton, Walter Plunkett, Irene Saltern, and Vera West, to create fashions that complied with the new restrictions on fabric. Saltern's designs for the contest were then used for Priscilla Lane's costumes in Saboteur.

=== Use of irony and symbolism ===
Hitchcock made use of irony on numerous occasions in Saboteur. For example, early in the film, the authorities are seen as menacing, while the well-respected rancher and kind grandfather is an enemy agent. In contrast, only ordinary folks and the down-on-their-luck perceive Kane's innocence and offer trust: a long-haul truck driver, a blind householder and the circus freaks. In New York City, wealthy Mrs. Sutton is secretly funding an enemy group.

Saboteur is an early example of the distrust of authority that is one of Hitchcock's hallmarks. The plot structure of the film, with the falsely accused man having to go undercover and track down the real crooks/spies whilst criss-crossing the US, and the final fight high up on an iconic American monument (and with the hero assisted here by his lady), clearly prefigure North by Northwest, filmed almost twenty years later. These parallels are openly discussed in Truffaut's famous book of interviews with him, Hitchcock/Truffaut, in the pages dealing with the earlier film, and when Truffaut notes that North by Northwest was a kind of remake of the older film, Hitchcock confirms: "Yes".

Driving along the New York waterfront, Kane's car passes the capsized hulk of the liner SS Normandie, an ominous warning of what could happen if the conspirators succeed in their plans.

The final battle symbolizing tyranny against democracy takes place on the torch of the Statue of Liberty.

== Reception ==
Saboteur did "very well at the box office even with its B-list cast"; it made a "tidy profit for all involved." Bosley Crowther of The New York Times called the film a "swift, high-tension film which throws itself forward so rapidly that it permits slight opportunity for looking back. And it hurtles the holes and bumps which plague it with a speed that forcefully tries to cover them up." Crowther commented that "so abundant [are] the breathless events that one might forget, in the hubbub, that there is no logic in this wild-goose chase"; he also questioned the "casual presentation of the FBI as a bunch of bungling dolts, [the film's] general disregard of authorized agents, and [its] slur on the navy yard police", all of which "somewhat vitiates the patriotic implications which they have tried to emphasize in the film."

Time magazine called Saboteur "one hour and 45 minutes of almost simon-pure melodrama from the hand of the master"; the film's "artful touches serve another purpose which is only incidental to Saboteur's melodramatic intent. They warn Americans, as Hollywood has so far failed to do, that fifth columnists can be outwardly clean and patriotic citizens, just like themselves."

Filmink wrote, in 2024, "it’s clear Cummings didn’t command the screen as well as a Gary Cooper or Joel McCrea (who Hitchcock wanted); nonetheless he and Lane bring a fresh-faced young enthusiasm to their performances."

Norman Lloyd recalls that Ben Hecht told Hitchcock after seeing the death of Norman Lloyd's character due to his coat sleeve tearing away, "He should have had a better tailor."

== Legacy ==
Critic Rob Nixon, writing for Turner Classic Movies, points out that Saboteur shares several essential elements with Hitchcock's later movie North by Northwest (1959), including the ordinary/every-man protagonist who gets accused of a terrible crime and must avoid being captured by the police as he attempts to solve the mystery and clear his name (which is a recurring theme in Hitchcock's movies), and, the climactic scene in which the protagonist attempts to save another character from falling off a huge national monument.
