= Frances Carson =

American actress (1895–1973)

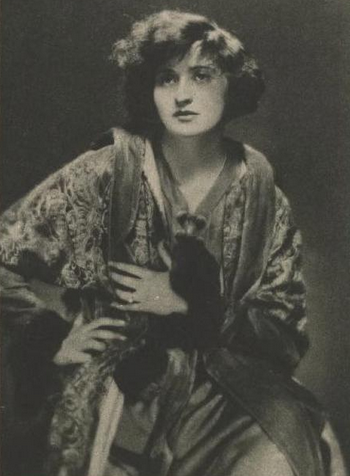
- Carson in 1921
- Born: April 1, 1895; Philadelphia, Pennsylvania, U.S.
- Died: October 20, 1973 (aged 78); Los Angeles, California, U.S.
- Other names: Frances Blind
- Occupation: Actress

Frances Carson (April 1, 1895 – October 20, 1973) was an American actress on stage and in films, including three Alfred Hitchcock films.

== Early life ==
Carson was from Philadelphia, and started acting and modeling professionally in her teens.

== Career ==
Carson was an actress known for stage work in New York and London, and for film roles. She performed on Broadway in shows including Poor Little Thing (1914) with her husband Eric Blind, The White Feather (1915), The Riddle: Woman (1918-1919), The Hottentot (1920), The Bad Man (1920), The Scarlet Man (1921), The Blue Lagoon (1921), Two Married Men (1925), Potiphar's Wife (1928), The First Law (1929), Slightly Scandalous (1944), and The Visitor (1944).

In London, Carson appeared in Glamour (1922), The Love Habit (1923), R.U.R. (1923, with Basil Rathbone) The Last Warning (1923), Havoc (1924), The Happy Hangman (1925), The Silver Fox (1925), Virginia's Husband (1926), Aloma: A Tale of the South Seas (1926–1927), These Internationals (1928), and The Barker (1928). When she played Salome in Leonid Andreyev's Katerina in 1926, with John Gielgud, her revealing costume prompted a censor to insist that she wear a shawl on stage. She also co-wrote a play, The Unknown Woman; it was produced in London in 1927.

Her costumes were photographed and described in fashion columns. Critic Giles P. Cain noted in 1917 that "Miss Carson has some decided marks of individuality of speech and manner that bespeak her realization of the fact that merely being natural on the stage is no sign of any very great merit." Noël Coward mentioned seeing Carson dining with Irving Berlin and Elsie Janis at the Algonquin Hotel. British Pathé made a short newsreel about Carson having her fingernails painted by artist Arthur Ferrier in 1924. Also in 1924, she attended a séance with P. G. Wodehouse, Hannen Swaffer, and Donald Calthrop, and believed that she was contacted by her late husband on this occasion.

Carson had roles in several films, including Java Head (1934), Foreign Correspondent (1940), Smilin' Through (1941), Two-Faced Woman (1941), Saboteur (1942), Framing Father (1942), Scattergood Rides High (1942), and Shadow of a Doubt (1943).

== Personal life ==
Carson married British actor Eric Blind in 1913; he died suddenly from pneumonia in 1916. She was living with fellow actress Blanche Yurka in Los Angeles in 1940, and died in 1973, aged 78 years.
