= The Happy Ending =

1969 film by Richard Brooks

- Theatrical release poster
- Directed by: Richard Brooks
- Written by: Richard Brooks
- Produced by: Richard Brooks
- Starring: Jean Simmons; John Forsythe; Shirley Jones; Lloyd Bridges; Teresa Wright; Dick Shawn; Nanette Fabray; Bobby Darin; Tina Louise; Kathy Fields; Karen Steele
- Cinematography: Conrad L. Hall
- Edited by: George Grenville; Murray Jordan
- Music by: Michel Legrand
- Production company: Pax Enterprises
- Distributed by: United Artists
- Release date: December 21, 1969
- Running time: 112 minutes
- Country: United States
- Language: English

The Happy Ending is a 1969 American drama film written and directed by Richard Brooks, which tells the story of repressed housewife Mary Spencer who longs for liberation from her husband Fred and daughter Marge. It stars Jean Simmons, who received a nomination for the Academy Award for Best Actress and co-stars John Forsythe, Shirley Jones, Lloyd Bridges and Teresa Wright.

== Plot ==
1953: Through the course of a Colorado autumn and winter, Mary Spencer and Fred Wilson lead an idyllic existence. Mary drops out of college (with 6 months to go) to marry Fred. Their perfect wedding mirrors the happy endings of the films Mary loves.

1969: It is the Wilson's 16th wedding anniversary. On his way to work, Fred, a successful tax consultant, tells their maid Agnes that he has found vodka hidden in Mary's wardrobe and asks Agnes to keep an eye on his wife. Mary sets out for the beauty parlor. At an airline office, however, Mary buys a one-way ticket to Nassau, Bahamas, looking for an escape from her dull and unhappy suburban life.

On the flight, Mary recalls the horrors of last year's anniversary party, when Fred drunkenly flirted with a blonde divorcee, and she took refuge in the bottle and a rerun of Casablanca. At a stop-over, she calls home and learns this year's anniversary party has been a different sort of disaster. Her teenage daughter Marge is scared by Mary's call. It reminds her of the time she had found her mother unconscious after an overdose.

En route to Nassau, Mary meets Flo Harrigan, an old college friend she has not seen since 1953. While Mary settled down to married life, Flo has been the mistress of a series of married men, lives a carefree and hedonistic lifestyle, and has fully embraced the sexual revolution. She is on her way to Nassau to meet her latest beau, Sam. Mary tells her she has had to get away from Fred, so Flo promises to look after her.

In the Bahamas, Mary enjoys the sun and long, empty stretches of beach. At a casino, she meets Franco, a hustler from Los Angeles who is down on his luck. Franco mistakenly assumes that Mary is wealthy. He affects an Italian accent and tells Mary he is a journalist who writes about film stars. She agrees to go to "his" boat, but when he learns Mary is not wealthy, Franco quickly loses interest, confessing his scam.

Walking by the ocean, Mary recalls the occasion of her suicide attempt — she had returned from having a face lift to learn that Fred was in Reno with a girl. Marge had found her in danger of death and rushed her to hospital. After that, Mary resumed drinking, recklessly spent a lot of money, and crashed her car while driving drunk.

In the present, Sam proposes to Flo, who accepts. Mary flies back home. Agnes helps her move into rooms she has rented away from Fred and Marge. She takes a job and enrolls in night classes at the university. It is at the college where Fred finds Mary one evening. He asks, "What went wrong? All our friends are married, and they're happy...or seem to be. Alright, they put up with it. But without marriage, life would be disorganized, crazy." Her reply: "People in love are crazy." They tell one another they still love each other, but "it's not enough," she says. After some more conversation as he walks her toward the university entrance, she asks "If we were not married, would you marry me again?" The look on his face and lack of an affirmative answer says it all.

== Cast ==
- Jean Simmons as Mary Spencer Wilson
- John Forsythe as Fred Wilson
- Shirley Jones as Flo Harrigan
- Lloyd Bridges as Sam
- Teresa Wright as Mrs. Spencer
- Dick Shawn as Harry Bricker
- Nanette Fabray as Agnes
- Bobby Darin as Franco
- Tina Louise as Helen Bricker
- Kathy Fields as Marge Wilson
- Erin Moran as Young Marge Wilson (uncredited)
- Karen Steele as Divorcee
- Gail Hensley as Betty
- Eve Brent as Ethel
- William O'Connell as Minister
- Barry Cahill as Handsome Man
- Miriam Blake as Cindy
- John Gallaudet as Airplane Passenger (uncredited)
- Nanci Roberts as Model (uncredited)

== Production ==
The film was rated with an M certificate (the equivalent to a PG or PG-13) by the MPAA, and has a running time of 112 minutes.

Music for the film was composed and conducted by Michel Legrand, the song lyrics by Alan Bergman and Marilyn Bergman. The soundtrack performance of "What Are You Doing the Rest of Your Life?" was sung by Michael Dees and the soundtrack songs "Hurry Up 'N Hurry Down" and "Something for Everybody" were performed by William Eaton. The song was one of the eight pieces of music chosen by Jean Simmons when she appeared on the BBC Radio program Desert Island Discs on August 9, 1975.

== Reception ==
In Life magazine, Richard Schickel gave a negative review, describing the film as a "melodramatic travesty" and criticizing its unlikeable characters. The New York Times's Vincent Canby was also critical, writing The Happy Ending "is a kind of false Faces—a movie that set out to expose the kitsch of Hollywood fantasy". Canby also included the movie in his list of “ten worst films of 1969” for the paper: “Brooks-the-writer is handicapped by an ear for real-life small talk that is block tin.”

The film was nominated for Academy Awards for Best Actress (Jean Simmons) and Best Original Song (Michel Legrand, Alan Bergman and Marilyn Bergman for "What Are You Doing the Rest of Your Life?") at the 42nd Academy Awards.

In 2020, Richard Brody of The New Yorker gave a retrospective review in which he praised the film. He wrote, "The shudderingly impassioned, history-jangled, cinema-centric drama The Happy Ending, from 1969, reflects vast changes in Hollywood and in American society, and even nudges them ahead. What's more, it does so aesthetically, with startlingly expressive images and performances that fuse with the action to reflect on—and advance—the state of movies themselves."

== Awards and nominations ==
Award	Category	Nominee(s)	Result	Ref.
Academy Awards	Best Actress	Jean Simmons	Nominated	
Academy Awards	Best Song – Original for the Picture	"What Are You Doing the Rest of Your Life?"; Music by Michel Legrand; Lyrics by Alan and Marilyn Bergman	Nominated	
Golden Globe Awards	Best Actress in a Motion Picture – Drama	Jean Simmons	Nominated	
Golden Globe Awards	Best Original Score – Motion Picture	Michel Legrand	Nominated	
Golden Globe Awards	Best Original Song – Motion Picture	"What Are You Doing the Rest of Your Life?"; Music by Michel Legrand; Lyrics by Alan and Marilyn Bergman	Nominated	

== See also ==
- List of American films of 1969
