= Edith Fellows =

American actress (1923–2011)

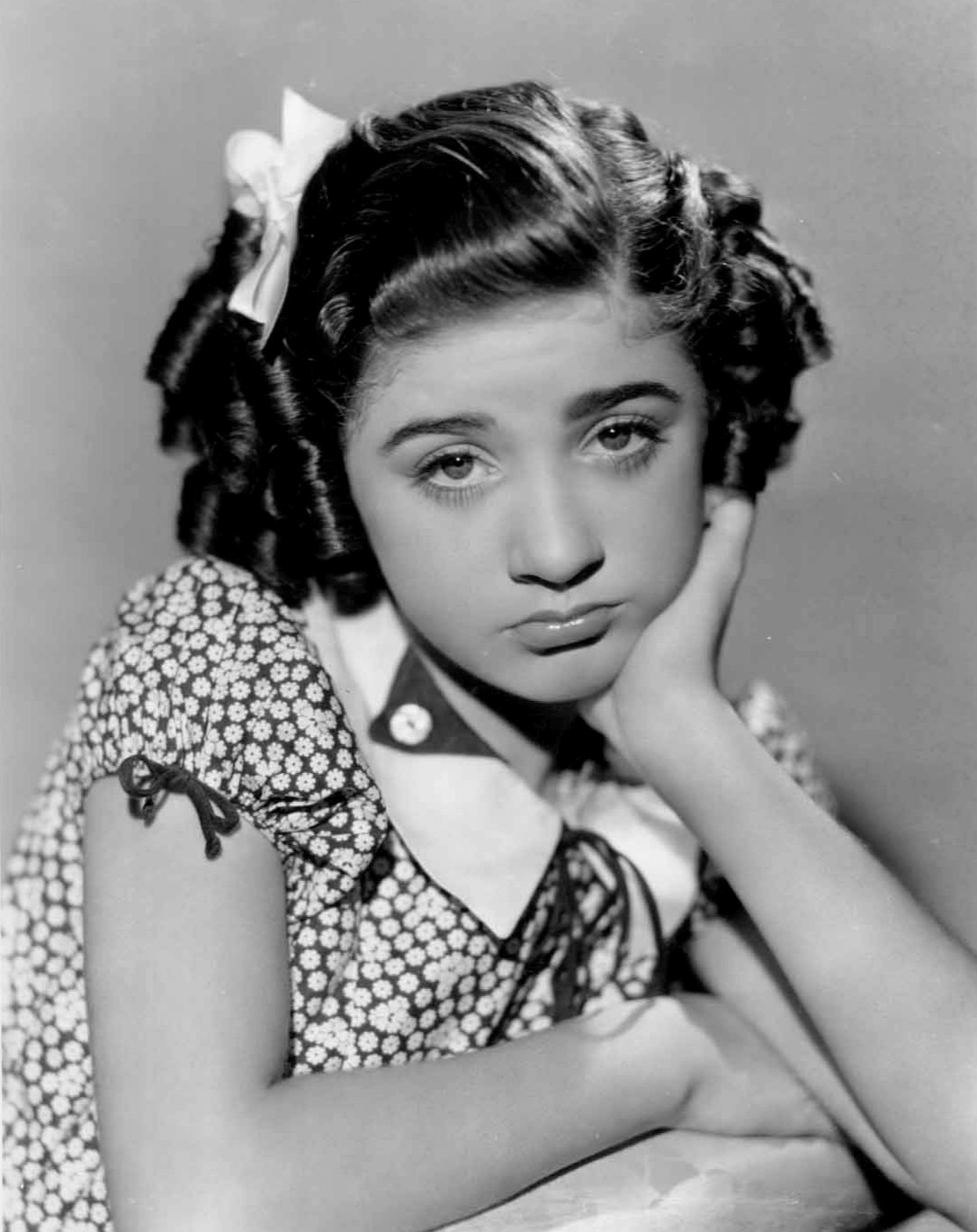
- Edith Fellows in 1937
- Born: Edith Marilyn Fellows; May 20, 1923; Boston, Massachusetts, U.S.
- Died: June 26, 2011 (aged 88); Woodland Hills, California, U.S.
- Occupation: Actress
- Years active: 1928–1994
- Spouse: Freddie Fields (m. 1946; div. 1956)
- Children: Kathy Fields
- Relatives: Natalie Lander (granddaughter)

Edith Marilyn Fellows (May 20, 1923 – June 26, 2011) was an American actress who became a child star in the 1930s. Best known for playing orphans and street urchins, Fellows was an expressive actress with a good singing voice. She made her screen debut at the age of five in Charley Chase's film short Movie Night (1929). Her first credited role in a feature film was The Rider of Death Valley (1932). By 1935, she had appeared in over twenty films. Her performance opposite Claudette Colbert and Melvyn Douglas in She Married Her Boss (1935) won her a seven-year contract with Columbia Pictures, the first such contract offered to a child.

Fellows appeared in her own star vehicles for Columbia, Her performance as the precocious orphan alongside Bing Crosby in Pennies from Heaven (1936) won her critical acclaim.

In 1942, she appeared in two Gene Autry films, Heart of the Rio Grande and Stardust on the Sage, which highlighted her fine singing voice. Her acting career was interrupted in the 1940s by serious personal problems, her own life becoming more Dickensian than the characters she portrayed on screen. In the 1980s, she returned to acting with sporadic roles in television series. Between 1929 and 1995, Fellows appeared in over seventy films and television programs.

== Early years ==
Edith Marilyn Fellows was born on May 20, 1923, in Boston, Massachusetts, the only child of Willis and Harriet Fellows. Her mother abandoned her a few months after her birth. At the age of two, she moved to Charlotte, North Carolina, with her father and her paternal grandmother, Elizabeth Fellows.

As a toddler, she took dancing lessons to correct her pigeon-toed walk. At the age of four, she was spotted by a supposed talent scout, who arranged a Hollywood screen test for fifty dollars. She and her grandmother traveled to Hollywood by train to discover they had been swindled. While her grandmother worked as a housecleaner, she stayed with a local family whose son worked as an extra in movies. She accompanied him to the studio one day. Without being asked, she began dancing and singing in front of the bemused director. When the boy became ill a few days later, the studio sent the message "Send the girl." She was soon cast in comedian Charley Chase's film short Movie Night (1929), playing Charley's brat daughter on a family outing to the movies.

Additional screen roles soon followed, including Daddy Long Legs (1931), The Rider of Death Valley (1932), two Our Gang comedies, Shivering Shakespeare (1930) and Mush and Milk (1933), and Jane Eyre (1934) for Monogram Pictures, in which she played Mr. Rochester's ward, a precocious matchmaker trying to bring together her guardian and Jane. That same year, Fellows appeared with W C Fields in Mrs Wiggs of the Cabbage Patch, playing Australia Wiggs, one of five children being brought up in a shanty town by their poverty-stricken mother whose husband had deserted her. By 1935, she had made over twenty films and was ready for a breakthrough.

== Child star ==
In 1935, Fellows appeared in Gregory La Cava's She Married Her Boss (1935) as Melvyn Douglas's deceitful daughter who is tamed when Claudette Colbert "spanks the daylight out of her" with a hairbrush. Her performance landed her a seven-year contract with Columbia Pictures and she became a star at the age of twelve. With her first Columbia films, One-Way Ticket, And So They Were Married, and Tugboat Princess, she continued to be typecast as the orphan or street urchin. In the fall of 1936, her popularity was helped significantly by her co-starring role opposite Bing Crosby in Pennies from Heaven, in which she played a tough, precocious orphan protected by Crosby's singing vagabond. Whereas in previous films her robust character was tamed by a swift spanking, in this film she is "soothed by the crooning of Crosby, particularly the title song sung to her during a thunderstorm." In his review in The New York Times, Frank S. Nugent singled out Fellows's performance writing:

The chief honors properly belong to little Miss Fellows. Hers really is an exceptional performance for a youngster, skirting the perils of bathos in her tender scenes and playing her rebellious ones with comic impertinence.

Columbia continued to cast Edith Fellows in juvenile leads, including Tugboat Princess (1936), Little Miss Roughneck (1938), and The Little Adventuress (1938). She also was the senior member of The Five Little Peppers (1939-40) in Columbia's series of homespun family stories. Toward the end of her tenure at Columbia she wrote an original story for what became her last Columbia picture, Her First Beau, and included a sidekick role for her offscreen friend Millie Lou. The script went into production, but Fellows received an unsettling surprise: Jane Withers was loaned out by 20th Century-Fox to play the lead, replacing Fellows as the star, and Fellows was reduced to playing "Millie Lou."

Fellows continued to make films through the early 1940s, but she was no longer a child, and demand for diminutive film actresses (she was 4 feet, 10.5 inches tall) was negligible. Now released from Columbia, Fellows found work at the smaller, independent studios Monogram Pictures, Republic Pictures, and finally Producers Releasing Corporation (PRC Pictures). Two of the films were Gene Autry westerns (Heart of the Rio Grande and Stardust on the Sage), which showcased her fine singing voice. After the PRC assignment (Girls Town, 1943), she left the screen.

== Family troubles ==
Throughout these years, Fellows's grandmother ran her life and career with an iron hand—not allowing her to play with her friends. Eventually, her grandmother isolated her from anyone who might present a negative influence, which appeared to be nearly everyone, including her father, whom her grandmother sent packing after he joined them in California. In the mid 1930s, Edith's mother arrived at her house after being gone for over a decade, saying she had come for her daughter—and her movie earnings. In the coming months, a bitter custody battle took place, covered by newspapers nationwide in the summer of 1936. Edith’s mother made outrageous claims, saying that the girl was abducted by her grandmother—a charge taken seriously in the wake of the Lindbergh kidnapping four years earlier—and that her father once tried to sell her to a dancing school. Edith later recalled having mixed emotions about having to choose between a domineering grandmother and a mother who seemed "cold and a little tough." When asked by the court, she chose her grandmother, testifying that she was "not used to loving strangers." The judge awarded custody of Edith to her grandmother and ordered her earnings placed in trust. (Note: Fellows would never see this money. When she turned twenty-one and requested her earnings—estimated at $100,000—she was given a check for $900.60. Her grandmother had died several years earlier. According to her daughter, to the end of her life Edith believed her mother managed to confiscate her money.)

== Later career ==
In 1946, Fellows married talent agent Freddie Fields, with whom she had a daughter, Kathy. Fellows turned to the stage, appearing on Broadway in Louisiana Lady, a short-lived 1947 musical. She began acting in television dramas in the early 1950s, appearing in Musical Comedy Time (1950), Studio One in Hollywood (1952), Armstrong Circle Theatre (1952), Tales of Tomorrow (1951–1953), and Medallion Theatre (1954). She also appeared in Uncle Willie, a stage comedy starring Menasha Skulnik that ran for several months in 1956 and 1957. The breakdown of her marriage in the mid 1950s led to a serious psychological crisis. While performing in a charity show in New York in 1958, she became paralyzed with fear and could not go on stage. A psychiatrist diagnosed stage fright and prescribed Librium. Fellows became dependent on the drug, along with Valium and alcohol.

The diagnosis marked the beginning of a downward spiral into dependence, interrupted briefly by a second failed marriage that ended when her husband tried to persuade her to return to acting. Penniless, Fellows took a series of jobs as an operator for telephone answering services while sinking deeper into alcoholism and depression. Apart from two minor uncredited roles in films, Fellows did not act again until 1979.

== Recovery ==
In the late 1970s, Fellows met Rudy Venz, a playwright and director at a Los Angeles community theatre. Venz learned of her story from his girlfriend, who worked with the former child star, and proposed the idea of turning her story into a play, inviting her to star in it. In 1979, Fellows returned to the stage for the first time in decades and appeared in Venz's stage production of Dreams Deferred, overcoming her stage fright. The experience inspired her to make guest appearances on the television series The Brady Brides (1981), Simon & Simon (1982) (as a telephone operator, ironically), Father Murphy (1982), Scarecrow and Mrs. King (1983), Cagney & Lacey (1982–1986), ER (1995), and The Pursuit of Happiness (1995), which was her final performance. She retired from acting in 1995.

In her later years, Fellows lived in a courtyard apartment in Hollywood with her three cats. She died of natural causes on June 26, 2011, at the Motion Picture Country Home at the age of 88.

== Selected filmography ==
- Movie Night (1929, Short) - The Chase Daughter
- Madame X (1929) - Child at Puppet Show (uncredited)
- Shivering Shakespeare (1930, Short) - Girls Scared of Elephant
- Cimarron (1931) - (uncredited)
- Daddy Long Legs (1931) - Orphan (uncredited)
- Huckleberry Finn (1931) - Schoolgirl (uncredited)
- Wicked (1931) - Child (uncredited)
- Emma (1932) - Gypsy as a Child (uncredited)
- The Rider of Death Valley (1932) - Betty Joyce
- Divorce in the Family (1932) - Little Girl with Kite (uncredited)
- Once in a Lifetime (1932) - Flower Girl in Movie Wedding Scene (uncredited)
- Birthday Blues (1932, Short) - Girl with string in mouth
- Law and Lawless (1932) - Betty Kelley
- The Penguin Pool Murder (1932) - Little Girl at Aquarium (uncredited)
- The Devil's Brother (1933) - Girl (uncredited)
- Mush and Milk (1933, Short) - Orphan
- The Power and the Glory (1933) - Student (uncredited)
- Girl Without a Room (1933) - Child (uncredited)
- Two Alone (1934) - Rogers' Daughter (uncredited)
- This Side of Heaven (1934) - Felicia - Minister's Daughter (uncredited)
- The Life of Vergie Winters (1934) - Child Extra in 1910 Sequence (uncredited
- Cross Streets (1934) - Little Sister
- His Greatest Gamble (1934) - Alice - as a Child
- Jane Eyre (1934) - Adele Rochester
- She Was a Lady (1934) - Child (uncredited)
- Mrs. Wiggs of the Cabbage Patch (1934) - Australia Wiggs
- Kid Millions (1934) - Little Girl in Ice Cream Number (uncredited)
- Black Fury (1935) - Agnes Shemanski (uncredited)
- Dinky (1935) - Sally
- Keeper of the Bees (1935) - Jean Marie Meredith / Little Scout
- She Married Her Boss (1935) - Annabel Barclay
- One Way Ticket (1935) - Ellen
- And So They Were Married (1936) - Brenda Farnham
- Tugboat Princess (1936) - 'Princess' Judy
- Pennies From Heaven (1936) - Patsy Smith
- Life Begins with Love (1937) - Dodie Martin
- Little Miss Roughneck (1938) - Foxine LaRue
- City Streets (1938) - Winnie Brady
- The Little Adventuress (1938) - Pinky Horton
- Five Little Peppers and How They Grew (1939) - Polly Pepper
- Pride of the Blue Grass (1939) - Midge Griner
- Music in My Heart (1940) - Mary
- Five Little Peppers at Home (1940) - Polly Pepper
- Out West with the Peppers (1940) - Polly Pepper
- Five Little Peppers in Trouble (1940) - Polly Pepper
- Nobody's Children (1940) - Pat
- Her First Romance (1940) - Linda Strong
- Her First Beau (1941) - Millie Lou
- Girls' Town (1942) - Sue Norman
- Heart of the Rio Grande (1942) - Connie Lane
- Stardust on the Sage (1942) - Judy Drew
- Criminal Investigator (1942) - Ellen Grey
- Lilith (1964) - Patient (uncredited)
- Mirage (1965) - Minor Role (uncredited)
- Between Two Brothers (1982, TV Movie) - Victim's Wife
- Grace Kelly (1983, TV Movie) - Edith Head
- Happy Endings (1983, TV Movie)
- The Hills Have Eyes Part II (1984) - Mrs. Wilson
- Riptide (1984) - Helen Howell
- In the Mood (1987) - Dorothy Long, Judy's Mother
