= City Streets (1938 film) =

1938 film by Albert S. Rogell

- Directed by: Albert S. Rogell
- Written by: Lou Breslow; Fred Niblo, Jr.,
- Produced by: Wallace MacDonald
- Starring: Leo Carrillo; Edith Fellows
- Cinematography: Allen G. Siegler
- Edited by: Viola Lawrence
- Production company: Columbia Pictures
- Distributed by: Columbia Pictures
- Release date: July 1, 1938
- Running time: 68 minutes
- Country: United States
- Language: English

City Streets is a 1938 American melodrama film directed by Albert S. Rogell and starring Leo Carrillo, Edith Fellows and Tommy Bond. It was produced and distributed by Columbia Pictures.

== Plot ==
In New York City Wheel-chair bound orphan Winnie Brady is taken in by shopkeeper Joe Carmine. An unsuccessful operation on Winnie's legs bankrupts Carmine, who then sells fruit on the streets. Winnie is sent to live in an orphanage, and Carmine is discouraged from continuing his relationship with her. Carmine is so distraught by grief that he slowly begins to die. Winnie is brought to him by local priest Father Ryan, and she finds the strength to stand and walk to his bedside, eventually regaining full use of her legs.

== Cast ==
- Leo Carrillo as Joe Carmine
- Edith Fellows as Winnie Brady
- Tommy Bond as Tommy Francis Devlin
- Mary Gordon as Mrs. Devlin
- Frank Sheridan as Father Ryan
