= After Office Hours =

1935 film by Robert Zigler Leonard

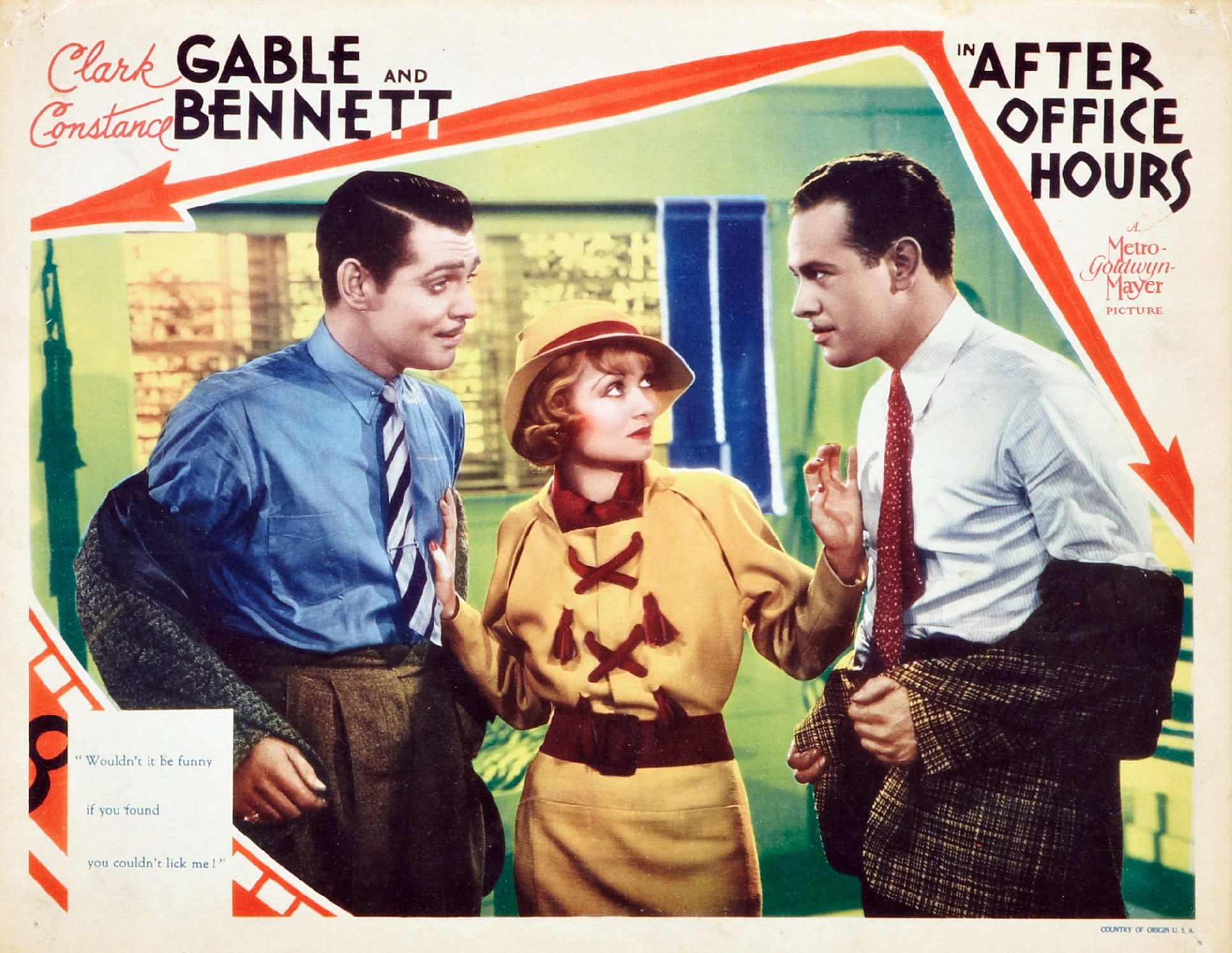
- Lobby card
- Directed by: Robert Z. Leonard
- Written by: Laurence Stallings; Dale Van Every
- Screenplay by: Herman J. Mankiewicz
- Produced by: Robert Z. Leonard; Bernard H. Hyman
- Starring: Clark Gable; Constance Bennett; Stuart Erwin
- Cinematography: Charles Rosher
- Edited by: Tom Held
- Production company: Metro-Goldwyn-Mayer
- Distributed by: Loew's Inc.
- Release date: February 22, 1935
- Running time: 72 minutes
- Country: United States
- Language: English
- Budget: $366,000
- Box office: $1.2 million

After Office Hours is a 1935 American crime drama film directed by Robert Z. Leonard and starring Clark Gable, Constance Bennett, Stuart Erwin and Billie Burke. The screenplay was written by Herman Mankiewicz.

== Plot ==
Jim Branch, a newspaper editor, falls for wealthy socialite Sharon Norwood, after having fired her as a reporter, all the while trying to solve a murder mystery, involving her childhood friend Tommy Bannister. Once Jim discovers that Sharon is involved with all the participants in the murder, she becomes even more attractive to him.

== Cast ==
- Constance Bennett as Sharon Norwood
- Clark Gable as James "Jim" Branch
- Stuart Erwin as Hank Parr
- Billie Burke as Mrs. Norwood
- Harvey Stephens as Tommy Bannister
- Katharine Alexander as Julia Patterson
- Hale Hamilton as Henry King Patterson
- Henry Travers as Cap
- Henry Armetta as Italian diner owner
- Charles Richman as Jordan
- Herbert Bunston as Barlow, Norwood's butler
- Margaret Dumont as Mrs. Murchison
- William Demarest as police detective
- Rita La Roy as Branch's Society Girlfriend

== Box office ==
According to MGM records the film earned $759,000 in the US and Canada and $522,000 elsewhere resulting in a profit of $492,000.
