= Little Miss Roughneck =

1938 film by Aubrey Scotto

- Directed by: Aubrey Scotto
- Written by: Grace Neville; Fred Niblo Jr. Michael L. Simmons
- Produced by: Wallace MacDonald
- Starring: Leo Carrillo; Edith Fellows
- Cinematography: Benjamin Kline
- Edited by: James Sweeney
- Distributed by: Columbia Pictures
- Release date: January 23, 1938
- Running time: 64 minutes
- Country: United States
- Language: English

Little Miss Roughneck is a 1938 American drama.

== Plot ==
Budding child vaudeville performer Foxine LaRue and her mother Gertrude LaRue will do anything to get Foxine into show business. Together, they stage a kidnapping hoax. Foxine is nowhere to be found, having hitched a ride on a freight train after mailing a ransom note. Overheard talking about the hoax, Gertrude is arrested by the police. Pascual Orozco finds Foxine, and she tells him she escaped from an orphanage. He tries to drive her back to the orphanage, but she steals his car. Orozco is also arrested for the kidnapping. A mob tries to hang Orozco, and Foxine finally confesses.

== Cast ==
- Edith Fellows – Foxine LaRue
- Jacqueline Wells – Mary LaRue
- Margaret Irving – Gertrude LaRue
- Leo Carrillo – Pascual Orozco
