= Johnny Got His Gun (film) =

1971 American film by Dalton Trumbo

- Original theatrical poster
- Directed by: Dalton Trumbo
- Screenplay by: Dalton Trumbo; Luis Buñuel (uncredited)
- Based on: Johnny Got His Gun by Dalton Trumbo
- Produced by: Bruce Campbell
- Starring: Timothy Bottoms; Kathy Fields; Marsha Hunt; Jason Robards; Donald Sutherland; Diane Varsi
- Cinematography: Jules Brenner
- Edited by: Millie Moore
- Music by: Jerry Fielding
- Color process: Black and white
- Production company: World Entertainment
- Distributed by: Cinemation Industries
- Release dates: May 14, 1971 (Cannes); August 4, 1971 (New York City)
- Running time: 111 minutes
- Country: United States
- Language: English
- Budget: $1 million+
- Box office: $767,794 (US/Canada theatrical rentals) or $1 million

Johnny Got His Gun is a 1971 American independent anti-war drama film written and directed by Dalton Trumbo. Based on his own novel of the same name, it was Trumbo's first and only directorial effort. The film stars Timothy Bottoms, Kathy Fields, Marsha Hunt, Jason Robards, Donald Sutherland, and Diane Varsi.

Although it was a minor success upon its initial release, the film was largely forgotten by the mass audience soon after. It received renewed attention in the late 1980s after clips from it were incorporated into the music video for Metallica's single "One", and the film has subsequently become a cult film. Eventually, Metallica bought the rights to the film in order to be able to show the music video without having to keep paying royalties.

== Plot ==
Joe Bonham, a young American soldier during World War I, awakens in a hospital bed after being hit by an artillery shell. He has lost his eyes, ears, mouth, nose, and limbs, but remains conscious and able to reason, rendering him a prisoner in his own body. As he drifts between reality and fantasy, he remembers his old life with his Christian Science family and his girlfriend Kareen. He also forms a bond of sorts with a young nurse who senses his plight, although the doctors think he is in a vegetative state.

Eventually, Joe communicates with his doctors by banging his head against his pillow in Morse code, spelling out "help" to show he is conscious. He is asked what he wants, and requests for the United States Army to put him in a glass coffin in a freak show as a demonstration of the horrors of war. When told that this is against regulations, he responds by repeatedly begging to be euthanized.

Joe ultimately realizes that the U.S. Army will not grant either wish, and will likely leave him in a state of living death. His sympathetic nurse attempts to euthanize him by clamping his breathing tube, but her supervisor stops her before Joe can succumb. In the end, Joe is left alone in his bed in a utility room at the hospital, weakly repeating to himself, "S.O.S. Help me."

== Cast ==
- Timothy Bottoms as Joe Bonham
  - Kerry MacLane as Joe at age 10
- Kathy Fields as Kareen, Joe's girlfriend
- Marsha Hunt as Marcia Bonham, Joe's mother
- Jason Robards as Bill Bonham, Joe's father
- Donald Sutherland as Christ
- Diane Varsi as Fourth Nurse, who is the first to communicate with Joe
- Donald Barry as Jody Simmons, the owner of the bakery
- Eric Christmas as Corporal Timlon, a British soldier
- Eduard Franz as Colonel (later General) Tillery, Joe's primary doctor initially
- Charles McGraw as Mike Burkeman, Kareen's father
- Byron Morrow as Brigadier General, an American officer
- Sandy Brown Wyeth as Lucky, a prostitute from San Francisco
- Maurice Dallimore as British Colonel
- Anthony Geary as Redhead (a World War I Soldier)
- Edmund Gilbert as Priest
- Alice Nunn as Third Nurse
- Marge Redmond as First Nurse
- Jodean Russo as Second Nurse
- David Soul as Swede (a World War I Soldier)
- Bruce Watson as Technician, who communicates with Joe using Morse code

In one of Joe's fantasies, Dalton Trumbo (credited as "Robert Cole") plays the Orator who extols the medical techniques learned by keeping Joe alive, which he says will save money in the next war.

== Production ==
Trumbo wrote the first version of the script in 1964, in collaboration with Luis Buñuel, who was to direct. However, financing for this project failed to materialize, and it was abandoned.

In 1966, producer Bruce Campbell (Hey, Hey, Hey, It's Fat Albert, The Picasso Summer) teamed up with Trumbo, who wrote a film script and was attached to direct. This project was initially set up at Warner Bros., but those plans fell through, so Campbell and Trumbo invested $80,000 and attracted 25 investors to invest $600,000. The total cash outlay for the film was $750,000, but deferred technical fees put the budget over $1 million.

The film distinguishes between Joe's reality and fantasy by presenting the scenes in the hospital in black-and-white, and his dreams and memories in color. His dreams, such as when he talks to his dead father and Jesus Christ, are drug-induced, and the color is more saturated than it is during his memories, such as the fishing trip and his last night with Kareen. Joe's injuries are never seen in film, as his face is always covered by a mask and his body is always covered by the hospital sheets.

== Release ==
The film was entered into the 1971 Cannes Film Festival, where it shared the Grand Prix (second prize) with Miloš Forman's Taking Off and won the FIPRESCI Prize. Its North American distribution rights were acquired by Cinemation Industries, and it opened on August 4, 1971, at the RKO 59th Street Twin theater in New York City. All servicemen were admitted free. By September 30, 1972, the film had earned theatrical rentals of $767,794 in the United States and Canada.

=== Home media ===
The film was first released on DVD in the U.S. on April 28, 2009, by Shout! Factory. In addition to the film, the DVD includes a 2006 documentary about Trumbo and the making of the film (Dalton Trumbo: Rebel in Hollywood), a new interview with Bottoms, behind-the-scenes footage with newly-recorded commentary by Bottoms and cinematographer Brenner, the film's original theatrical trailer, a 1971 article about the film from American Cinematographer, a 1940 radio adaptation of the book for Arch Oboler's Plays starring James Cagney, and the music video for Metallica's 1989 single "One".

== Reception ==
The film has received mixed reviews. Roger Ebert gave it a full four-stars out of four, writing that Trumbo had handled the material, "strange to say, in a way that's not so much anti-war as pro-life. Perhaps that's why I admire it. Instead of belaboring ironic points about the 'war to end war,' Trumbo remains stubbornly on the human level. He lets his ideology grow out of his characters, instead of imposing it from above." Roger Greenspun of The New York Times, however, stated that much of the film was "a mess of clichéd, imprecise sentimentalizing and fantasizing. On any terms that I might recognize and possibly credit, Johnny Got His Gun is a stultifyingly bad movie."

Gene Siskel of the Chicago Tribune gave the film two-and-a-half stars out of four. He reported that he watched it twice, and, while he found it to be "as savagely effective as any antiwar film" after the first viewing, he changed his opinion after the second, feeling that "it didn't work at all," with the color flashback scenes "poorly acted and scripted", and the dreams "frequently much too detailed and barely illusory. In the black-and-white sequences, Trumbo is much more disciplined and effective."

Charles Champlin of the Los Angeles Times wrote that the film "seems too late—a passionate anti-war sermon arriving at a time when the sermon has been done often and better, and more to the point has long since been accepted by the congregation. Paradoxically, the particular horror which Trumbo lays before us is at once so special and terrible and so manifestly symbolic, that by the end it has lost much of its power to move us. You admire the passion but cannot be sure what it achieved." Similarly, Tom Shales of The Washington Post said that the film "means well," but "Trumbo is not nearly sophisticated enough as a writer, nor proficient enough as a director, to either grip or alarm us for very long [...] Trumbo can't decide whether to fill his movie with symbols or people, so the screenplay is usually hollow and vague and never quite true." Tom Milne of The Monthly Film Bulletin thought the film "might have worked" if Trumbo had "treated the whole film in the black-and-white, expressionist manner of the hospital scenes," but, as it is, the flashback and fantasy sequences "not only reveal influences as varied and ill-advised as Fellini and M*A*S*H, but provide Joe with a very mundane and rather lachrymose biography; the Unknown Soldier is no longer an awesome symbol when he is provided with a name, rank and serial number."

On the review aggregator website Rotten Tomatoes, 67% of 21 critics' reviews of the film are positive, with an average rating of 6.7/10.

== Legacy ==
The Japanese filmmaker Akira Kurosawa cited Johnny Got His Gun as one of his favorite films.

A TV film of the same name was made in Czechoslovakia in 1984.

The 1988 song "One" by heavy metal band Metallica has a central character similar to the one in Johnny Got His Gun, and the music video released in early 1989 features a number of clips from the film.

In 2008, actor Benjamin McKenzie performed as Joe Bonham in a "live on stage, on film" staging of Bradley Rand Smith's 1982 off-Broadway play based on Trumbo's novel. After a "city-by-city, single-screen release" of the filmed performance, a special educational DVD became available free of charge to every high school library in the U.S. in October 2010. The DVD contains the 2008 film, a pre-screening and post-screening discussion guide for students, a 15-minute featurette on the making of the 2008 film, a history of the novel, and the 1971 film's theatrical trailer.
