= Michael L. Simmons =

American screenwriter

- Born: April 5, 1896; New York City, New York, United States
- Died: February 1980 (aged 83); Maplewood, New Jersey, United States
- Occupation: Writer
- Years active: 1931–1946 (film)

Michael L. Simmons (1896–1980) was an American screenwriter and novelist. The 1933 film The Bowery was based on his novel Chuck Connors.

== Filmography ==
- First Aid (1931)
- The Honor of the Press (1932)
- The Bowery (1933)
- The Awakening of Jim Burke (1935)
- The Raven (1935)
- Girl of the Ozarks (1936)
- Venus Makes Trouble (1937)
- All American Sweetheart (1937)
- Murder in Greenwich Village (1937)
- Little Miss Roughneck (1938)
- Juvenile Court (1938)
- Flight to Fame (1938)
- Squadron of Honor (1938)
- The Little Adventuress (1938)
- Tropic Fury (1939)
- Missing Daughters (1939)
- Romance of the Redwoods (1939)
- Mutiny on the Blackhawk (1939)
- Scattergood Baines (1941)
- Scattergood Meets Broadway (1941)
- Scattergood Rides High (1942)
- Scattergood Survives a Murder (1942)
- Eyes of the Underworld (1942)
- Cinderella Swings It (1943)
- The Crime Smasher (1943)
- Two Weeks to Live (1943)
- They Live in Fear (1944)
- Landrush (1946)

== Bibliography ==
- Erickson, Hal. From Radio to the Big Screen: Hollywood Films Featuring Broadcast Personalities and Programs. McFarland, 2014.
- Kinnard, Roy & Crnkovich, Tony . The Films of Fay Wray. McFarland, 2005.
- Pitts, Michael R. Poverty Row Studios, 1929–1940: An Illustrated History of 55 Independent Film Companies, with a Filmography for Each. McFarland & Company, 2005.
