= Kathy Fields =

American actress and photographer

- Born: January 5, 1947 (age 78); United States
- Other names: Kathy Lander
- Occupations: Photographer; actress
- Spouse: David Lander (m. 1979; died 2020)
- Children: Natalie Lander
- Parent(s): Edith Fellows; Freddie Fields
- Relatives: Polly Bergen (stepmother)

Kathy Fields (born January 5, 1947) is an American photographer and actress. She is best known for her role as Kareen in the film Johnny Got His Gun (1971). She later became a professional photographer.

== Personal life ==
Fields is the daughter of actress Edith Fellows and agent and producer Freddie Fields. She was married to actor David Lander from 1979 until his death in 2020. Their daughter, Natalie Lander, was born on March 28, 1983.

== Acting filmography ==
- The Happy Ending (1969)
- Johnny Got His Gun (1971)

== Camera filmography ==
- The Towering Inferno (1974) – Still photographer
- The Man Who Would Be King (1975) – Still photographer
- Robin and Marian (1976) – Still photographer
- Lipstick (1976) – Still photographer
- Fun with Dick and Jane (1977) – Still photographer
- Bobby Deerfield (1977) – Still photographer
- Looking for Mr. Goodbar (1977) – Still photographer
- The Betsy (1978) – Still photographer
- C.H.O.M.P.S. (1979) – Still photographer
