= The Keeper of the Bees (1935 film) =

1935 film by Christy Cabanne

Keeper of the Bees
- Directed by: Christy Cabanne
- Written by: Gene Stratton-Porter (novel The Keeper of the Bees) & Adele S. Buffington (screenplay); George Waggner (screenplay)
- Produced by: Trem Carr (producer); William T. Lackey (producer)
- Starring: Neil Hamilton; Betty Furness; Emma Dunn; Edith Fellows
- Cinematography: Harry Neumann
- Edited by: Carl Pierson
- Distributed by: Monogram Pictures
- Release date: July 15, 1935
- Running time: 75 minutes
- Country: United States
- Language: English

Keeper of the Bees is a 1935 American film directed by Christy Cabanne. The film depicts WWI veteran Jamie McFarland (played by Neil Hamilton) and his search for meaning in his last six months to live, and Molly Campbell (played by Betty Furness), a young woman looking to save her sister's child from being left alone. It also features Emma Dunn as Margaret Campbell, Molly's charming mother and Edith Fellows as Jean-Marie "Little Scout" (not to be confused with Scout Finch), an adventurous young girl trying to fit in with her male friends.

The novel of the same name, upon which the film was based, appeared in Publishers Weekly as one of the bestselling novels in the United States in 1925.

== Plot ==
James "Jamie" Lewis McFarland is a veteran of the First World War whose damaged lungs means he only has six more months to live. Inspired by a nurse at the hospital he finds himself trapped in, he insists on living his last days in grand fashion and sneaks out of the hospital with the help of this nurse. On the way, he catches a ride from a good-looking young woman who catches his fancy. After riding in her car for a bit, she leaves him by the side of the road. Unfazed and fascinated by her remarkably blue eyes, he follows her to Peaceful Bay, where he comes across the house of an old beekeeper who is in critically poor health.

While Jamie seeks medical attention for the man, the Beekeeper instructs him to take care of his bees while he's away at the hospital, assuring him that his partner in beekeeping will come by soon to help. After the Beekeeper is taken away, his partner introduces himself as 10-year old "Little Scout," an enthusiastic young child with much knowledge of the keeping and maintenance of bees. He teaches Jamie the ways of the ranch and introduced him to his friends, who enjoy acting as a mock military battalion. He also meets his neighbor Ms. Campbell, a charming mother figure who takes care of him and treats him as she would a son. It is revealed in a separate scene that she has been missing her daughter for several months and that her daughter is the woman Jamie had gotten a ride from earlier.

That night, while on a walk, Jamie runs into this woman, crying to herself. After imploring her to tell him what's wrong, she admits that she needs to become legally married to someone for some undisclosed reason. Realizing that he's falling in love with her, he agrees to marry her if only legally. Despite his best efforts, she refuses to tell him her name. The next day, they are married at the courthouse, where Jamie learns that the mystery woman's name is "Louise". The woman immediately leaves Jamie and he returns to his bees, disappointed.

A series of rapid events quickly shakes his world: First, the old Beekeeper falls ill and dies, surprisingly leaving half of his possessions to Jamie and the other half to Little Scout, including the bees and their surrounding property. Little Scout admits to Jamie that she is actually a girl trying to blend in with the neighborhood boys, which leads him to encourage her to do what she wants as herself and not under a guise. Finally, Jamie receives a call telling him that his "wife" has just given birth and is ill.

He rushes to the hospital and finds a woman he's never met in the hospital bed, apologizing for never explaining to him the situation before dying. He returns to the house with a baby and a renewed confusion about the situation. Soon, the young woman to whom he is married arrives and reveals to him the whole story: that she is actually Molly Campbell (the niece of Ms. Campbell) and Louise is her cousin, the one who died in the hospital giving birth. Molly needed a marriage certificate, which she obtained by marrying Jamie as Louise, in order to save her cousin from others shaming her for having a baby outside of marriage. She wanted to keep this news from her mother to save her from the grief. Ms. Campbell hears anyway, but decides to not reveal this, instead opting to simply "have faith."

== Cast ==
- Neil Hamilton as James "Jamie" Lewis McFarland
- Betty Furness as Molly Campbell
- Emma Dunn as Margaret Campbell
- Edith Fellows as Jean Marie Meredith / Little Scout
- Hobart Bosworth as Michael the Bee Master
- Helen Jerome Eddy as Priscilla / Shorty
- Marion Shilling as Louise
- James P. Burtis as Red
- Barbara Bedford as Nurse
- Lafe McKee as Dr. Grayson
- George Cleveland as Judge
- William Worthington as Colonel
