= And So They Were Married =

1936 film directed by Elliott Nugent

- Directed by: Elliott Nugent
- Screenplay by: Doris Anderson; Joseph Anthony; Laurie Brazee
- Based on: Bless Their Hearts; 1936 story in Good Housekeeping by Sarah Addington
- Produced by: B. P. Schulberg
- Starring: Melvyn Douglas; Mary Astor; Edith Fellows
- Cinematography: Henry Freulich
- Edited by: Gene Milford
- Music by: Howard Jackson
- Production company: Columbia Pictures
- Distributed by: Columbia Pictures
- Release date: May 10, 1936
- Running time: 74 minutes
- Country: United States
- Language: English

And So They Were Married is a 1936 American romantic comedy film directed by Elliott Nugent and starring Melvyn Douglas, Mary Astor and Edith Fellows. The film was produced and distributed by Columbia Pictures. It has elements of a screwball comedy.

== Plot ==
When widower Stephen Blake and bitter divorcée Edith Farnham meet at a ski resort during a Christmas vacation, Blake's son and Farnham's daughter conspire to keep their romance from the altar. After creating much mayhem, they succeed in breaking things up, only to reconsider for their parents' happiness.

== Cast ==
- Melvyn Douglas as Stephen Blake
- Mary Astor as Edith Farnham
- Edith Fellows as Brenda Farnham
- Jackie Moran as Tommy Blake
- Donald Meek as the Hotel Manager
- Dorothy Stickney as Miss Peabody
- Romaine Callender as Mr. Snirley
- Douglas Scott as Horace
- Hooper Atchley as Fred Cutler - Hotel Clerk
- Wade Boteler as Police Captain
- Olaf Hytten as Secretary
- Dennis O'Keefe as Drunk in Car

== Bibliography ==
- Milberg, Doris. The Art of the Screwball Comedy: Madcap Entertainment from the 1930s to Today. McFarland, 2013.
- Renzi, Thomas. Screwball Comedy and Film Noir: Unexpected Connections. McFarland, 2012.
