= The Rider of Death Valley =

1932 film by Albert S. Rogell

- Theatrical release poster
- Directed by: Albert S. Rogell
- Screenplay by: Jack Cunningham
- Produced by: Carl Laemmle, Jr. Stanley Bergerman
- Starring: Tom Mix; Lois Wilson; Fred Kohler; Forrest Stanley; Edith Fellows; Willard Robertson
- Cinematography: Daniel B. Clark
- Edited by: Robert Carlisle
- Production company: Universal Pictures
- Distributed by: Universal Pictures
- Release date: April 24, 1932
- Running time: 78 minutes
- Country: United States
- Language: English

The Rider of Death Valley is a 1932 American pre-Code Western film directed by Albert S. Rogell and written by Jack Cunningham. The film stars Tom Mix, Lois Wilson, Fred Kohler, Forrest Stanley, Edith Fellows and Willard Robertson. The film was released on April 24, 1932, by Universal Pictures.

== Cast ==
- Tom Mix as Tom Rigby
- Lois Wilson as Helen Joyce
- Fred Kohler as Lew Grant
- Forrest Stanley as Doc Larribee
- Edith Fellows as Betty Joyce
- Willard Robertson as Bill Joyce
- Mae Busch as Tillie
- Otis Harlan as Peck
- Francis Ford as Gabe
- Tony the Horse as Tony
