= Irene Saltern =

American costume and fashion designer (1911–2005)

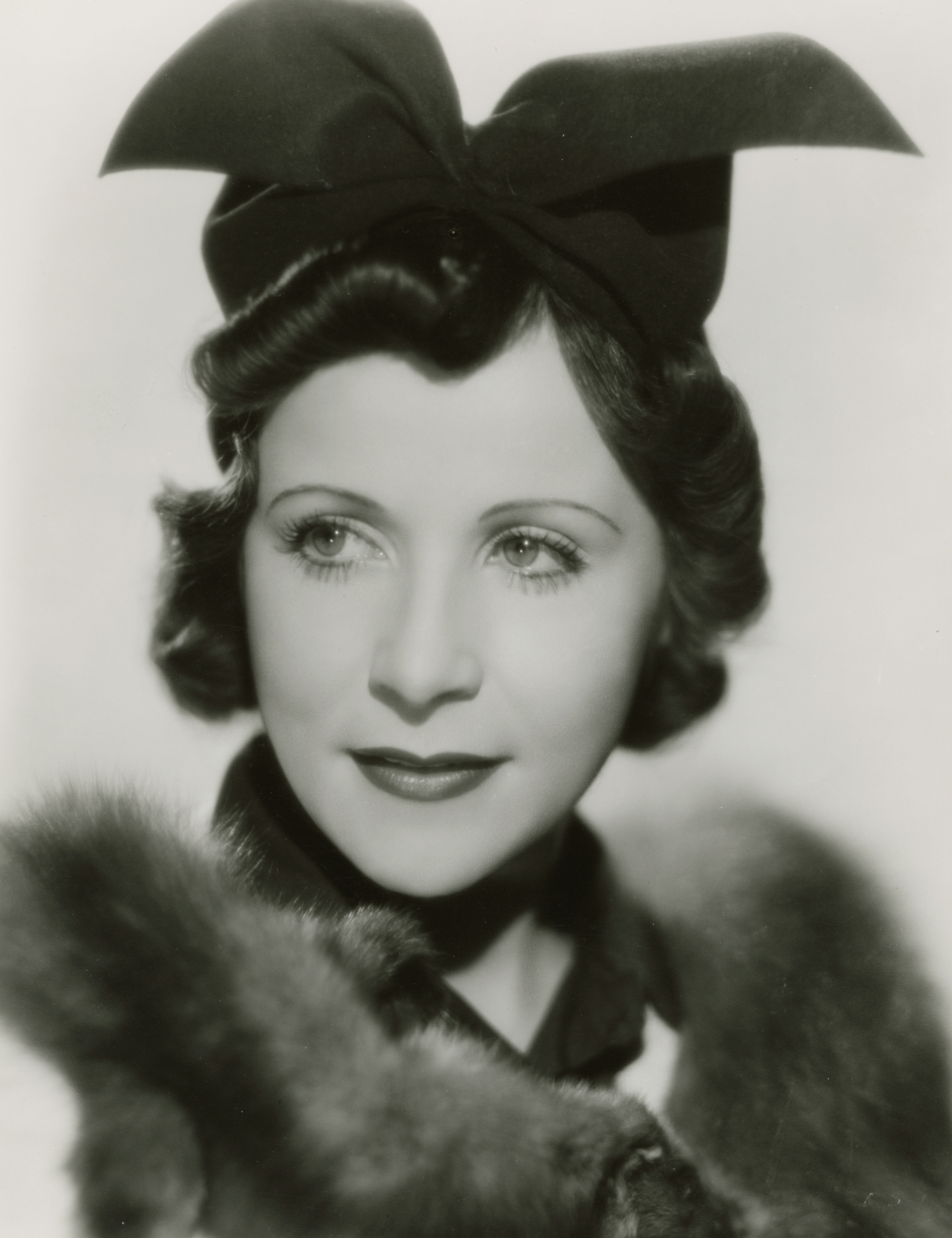
Irene Saltern, 1937

Irene Saltern (1911–2005, born Irene Stern) was an American costume designer and fashion designer. Named one of the top seven costume designers of the Golden Age of Hollywood by the Motion Picture Academy of Arts and Sciences in 1999, Saltern dressed more than 150 actresses in more than 50 films. She later spent 37 years working in commercial fashion design and is known for fashion innovations such as coordinated women's separates and bringing the California “sportswear” fashion aesthetic to wider markets.

== Early years ==
On January 30, 1911, Irene Saltern was born in Berlin to Jewish parents, Adolf Stern and Elsbeth Salomon Stern. The Stern family had a summer home in Caputh, Germany, where Albert Einstein and his wife were neighbors and close family friends. Einstein taught Irene to sail as a teenager and later attended her engagement party in 1932.

After high school, Saltern attended art schools and universities in Berlin and Paris, studying fashion design (dressmaking, fabrics and materials, and color composition) and news and fashion writing. While still in school, she designed the Venus bathing suits for the Maratti Company.

She married the judge Dr. Harry Salinger (1894–1982) in 1933. While Irene and Harry were on their honeymoon in 1933, Adolf Hitler came to power and both Harry and her father, a Berlin state architect (Regierungsbaumeister), were fired for being Jewish. Between 1933 and 1936, she travelled throughout Europe and neighboring countries while working for newspapers, magazines, and broadcasting stations. She wrote fashion and women's advice columns and reported on people, fashions, sports, and society in French, English, and German, under the professional name Saltern, a combination of Salinger and Stern.

In 1936, she and her husband Harry immigrated to the United States aboard the S.S. Normandie. They eventually settled in Los Angeles, where they joined Saltern's sister Inge, a professional photographer who had immigrated two years earlier.

== Hollywood costume design ==
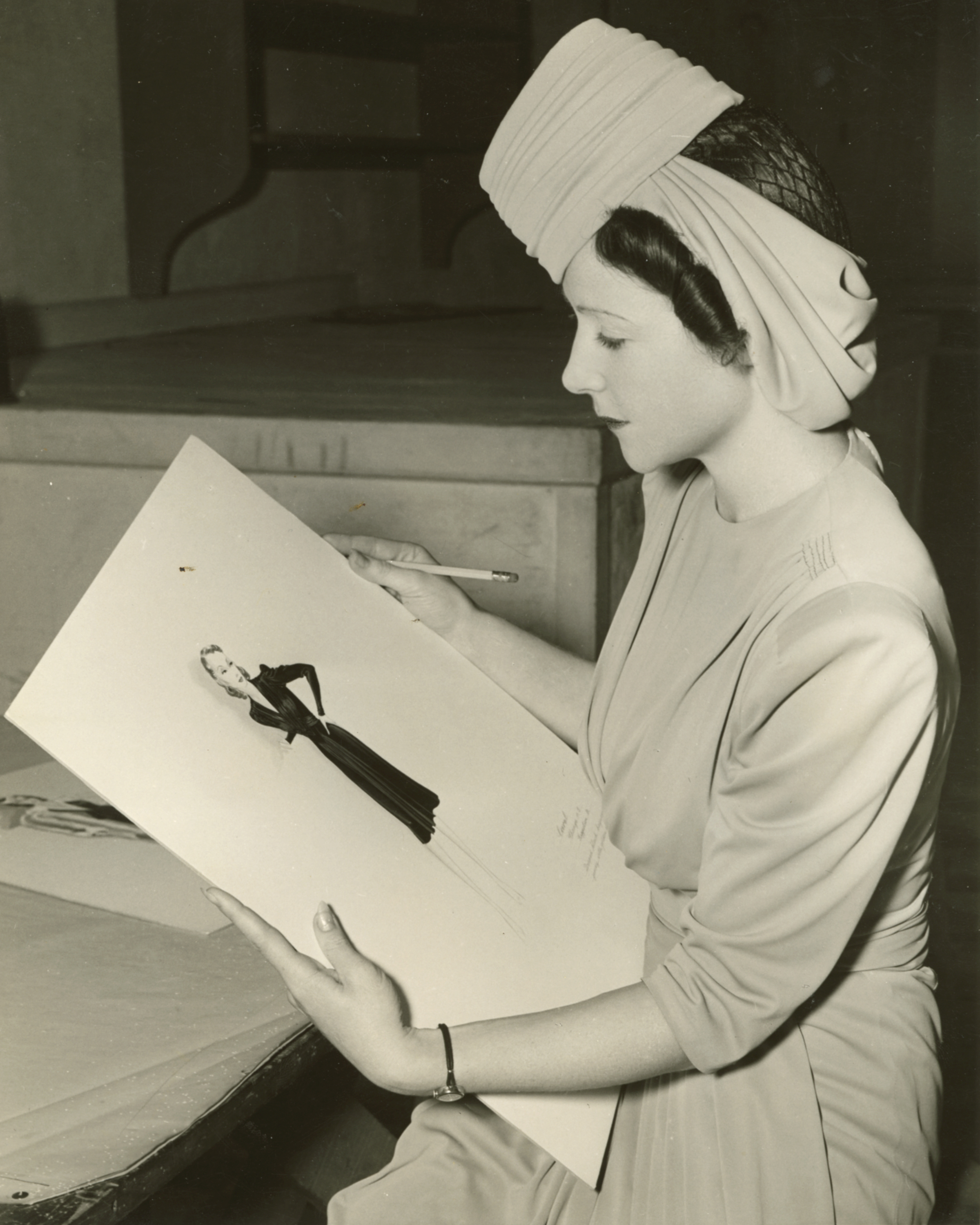
Irene Saltern holding her dress sketch from the movie So Ends Our Night (1941)

Two months after arriving in Hollywood, Saltern was hired to work in Universal Studios’ publicity department, thanks to an introduction from Max Factor’s son-in-law, whom she met at a German expat party.

In late 1937, Saltern was hired as a costume designer at Republic Pictures, where she created costumes for 34 movies in less than two years. Between 1940 and 1942, she was head of wardrobe design at Samuel Goldwyn Pictures as well as worked on films for the Paramount, Hal Roach, Frank Lloyd, Universal, and Columbia studios. During this period, she worked with directors including Alfred Hitchcock and Jack Skirball and designed costumes for Vivien Leigh, Cary Grant, Margaret Sullavan, Martha Scott, Olivia de Havilland, and dancer Ann Miller, among other actors.

In 1942, the New York Museum of Costume named Saltern one of 10 outstanding Hollywood designers, along with Edith Head, Dolly Tree, Irene Lentz Gibbons, Howard Greer, Travis Banton, Edward Stevenson, Avis Caminez, and Jack Huston.

== World War II era ==
When the US War Production Board issued guidelines for clothing rationing in 1942 (General Limitation Order L-85), the board invited Hollywood designers, including Saltern, to create fashions that complied with the new restrictions on fabric. Saltern's designs for the contest were then used for Priscilla Lane's costumes in Hitchcock's film Saboteur. Also in this period, she began designing commercially, including frocks for the Hollywood Premiere label and overalls for Sun Rose.

In an effort to raise money to get other family members out of Europe, Saltern also started several businesses, including a company selling snoods (decorative hairnets) that used Ginger Rogers and other Hollywood stars as models and a fashion doll company promoted by Ginger Rogers. She also was the fashion editor of the Silhouette style magazine for department stores, created personal wardrobes for Hollywood stars such as Martha Scott and Jane Russell, and designed costumes for the Pasadena Playhouse and other California theaters.

== Commercial fashion design ==
Moving full time into commercial fashion design, Saltern worked as head designer at Tabak of California from 1950–1954 and 1958–1966. Her designs introduced design elements to retail fashion previously utilized in the film industry. Examples include the use of optical illusion, or the use of styles, fabrics, and colors to create a slimming or silhouette effect. This technique was used in Hollywood costume design to counteract the lens distortion effect caused by wide-angle cameras.

Saltern is known for introducing career pantsuits for women and both the designs and merchandising concept for women's coordinated separates in the 1940s and 1950s. Saltern's Tabak Tie-Ins line in particular introduced coordinated separates, mix and match slacks, playsuits, shorts, full and slim skirts, blouses, sweaters, dresses, and jackets to fit women of various sizes and shapes.

From 1954–1957, Saltern launched her own company, TomBarry, under which she developed the Irene Saltern brand.

Before her retirement in 1979, Saltern also designed for Phil Rose, Sir James, Lanz-Alexa/Tonino, FigureMate, Pant Pouri (Lady R), City Girl, Cynaya, Nemy, Cheeks, Dizzy's Place, and Disegni.

== Death ==
Irene Saltern died on September 4, 2005 in Newport Beach, California, at the age of 94.

== Hollywood films and productions ==
Irene Saltern's designs included costumes for the following actors and films, among others:

- Olivia de Havilland as Gwen Manders in Raffles, 1939
- Cary Grant as Matt Howard in The Howards of Virginia, 1940
- Martha Scott as Jane Peyton in The Howards of Virginia, 1940; as Marta Keller in They Dare Not Love, 1941; and as Ella Bishop in Cheers for Miss Bishop, 1941
- Vivien Leigh as Lady Hamilton in That Hamilton Woman, 1941
- Ann Miller as Kitty Brown in Time Out for Rhythm, 1941
- Margaret Sullavan as Ruth Holland in So Ends Our Night, 1941
- Jane Withers as Penny Wood in Her First Beau, 1941
- Priscilla Lane as Patricia (Pat) Martin in Saboteur, 1942

== Exhibitions and museum collections ==
Saltern's design and sketches have been featured in numerous museum and library exhibitions:

- “Hollywood and History: Costume Design in Film,” Los Angeles County Museum of Art, 1987
- “Puttin’ on the Glitz: Hollywood's Influence on Fashion,” UC Irvine Libraries, October 2010
- “The Origins of Screen Style: The Leonard Stanley Archive,” Academy of Motion Picture Arts and Sciences, November 1999
- “California Design, 1930–1965, Living in a Modern Way,” Queensland Art Gallery, November 2013
- "Costumes from the Golden Age of Hollywood". Museum of Brisbane. November 2014.
- “Reading LACMA Objects as Products of Essential Agricultural Work,” Unframed.lacma.org, September 2020
- “Defiance: Jewish Women and Design in the Modern Era," Jewish Museum Berlin, July through November 2025

More than 100 of her costume design sketch boards, 2,600 of her commercial sketches, and 1,200 publicity photos of film costumes and commercial designs are held in the Irene Saltern Salinger Papers within the Special Collections and Archives at the University of California, Irvine Libraries.

Additional designs and sketches are part of the permanent collections at the University of Southern California, Los Angeles County Museum of Art, Fashion Institute of Design and Merchandising Museum, and Academy of Motion Picture Arts and Sciences. A collection of clothing designed by Saltern as well as family archival material is held in the Jewish Museum Berlin.
