= The Queen's Husband =

1928 play by Robert E. Sherwood

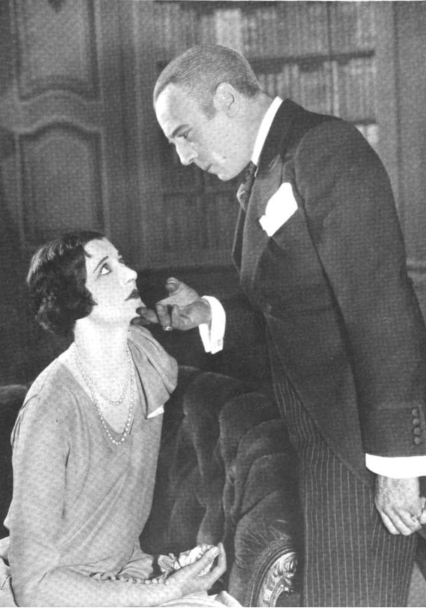
- Katharine Alexander and Roland Young
- Original language: English
- Written by: Robert E. Sherwood
- Subject: Figurehead king stands up to his ministers and his wife
- Genre: Satire
- Setting: The monarch's private office in the insular Kingdom of Merland.

Premiere
- Date: January 25, 1928
- Place: Playhouse Theatre
- Directed by: John Cromwell

The Queen's Husband is a 1928 play by Robert E. Sherwood. It is a three-act romantic satire. It has one setting and fifteen speaking parts. The action of the play takes place a little over two months time. The story concerns a henpecked monarch who during his wife's absence finds strength to exert his constitutional rights, to establish peace in the land and to secure his daughter's happiness. Most critics of the play assumed its genesis was the visit of Queen Marie of Romania to America in 1926.

The play was produced by William A. Brady Jr and Dwight Deere Wiman, staged by John Cromwell, with set designs by Livingston Platt. The Queen's Husband starred Roland Young with Katharine Alexander. It premiered in Manhattan during January 1928 and ran the rest of that season on Broadway, ending in May 1928 after 125 performances.

The Queen's Husband was adapted for an early sound film, The Royal Bed (1931), and under its original name for an hourlong US radio program in 1935 and a 1946 British television play.

== Characters ==
Characters are listed in order of appearance within their scope.

Lead

- Princess Anne is the King's independent daughter, in love with his secretary.
- King Eric VIII is a figurehead monarch for a parliamentary democracy, in a near loveless dynastic marriage.

Supporting

- Frederick Granton is the King's Secretary, a young commoner in love with Princess Anne.
- Phipps is a royal footman, the only person willing to play checkers with the King.
- Lord Birten is the Foreign Minister, a courtier type who sides with whoever is winning.
- Queen Martha is King Eric's domineering wife, at once controlling and aggrieved by it.
- General Northrup is the Premier, an ambitious, ruthless provocateur of political violence .

Featured

- Petley is a royal footman at the palace.
- Lady-in-waiting is there to be browbeat by the Queen.
- Another lady-in-waiting is likewise a target for the Queen's temper and tongue.
- Major Blent is the King's Equerry, the only official he can trust.
- Sergeant helps fortify the King's office during Act II.
- Dr. Fellman is the left-leaning opposition leader in parliament.
- Prince William is heir to the continental Empire of Greck; a loathsome sort with sophisticated morals.
- Laker is an anarchist demagogue, hostile to Northrup's policies.

== Synopsis ==
The play is set in the private office of the King, on the second floor of the palace, in the capital city of the Kingdom of Merland, located in the North Sea somewhere between Scotland and Denmark.

Act I (The King's private office. Afternoon) Frederick Granton turns away visitors announced by Phipps; the King is out for a walk. The Queen also is absent, preparing for her departure to America that day on a fund-raising trip. When Princess Anne comes seeking her father, Granton is delighted. The King arrives, followed by the Queen, who instructs him to wear a hussar uniform for her departure. Northrup comes in with Lord Birten, who has brought a penguin statuette for the King's collection, provoking a scolding from the Queen about the royal hobby. Northrup complains that execution papers for various political prisoners have not been signed, but is stymied by the King's obfuscation. Lord Birten has brought news for the Queen: the marriage alliance with Greck is agreed, the Princess Anne to marry Prince William. The Princess is dismayed, and so secretly is Granton, but the Queen is delighted. When alone with Phipps, the King suggests a game of checkers. The footman agrees but warns his monarch he is dubious about his sportsmanship. When the Queen returns, the King tries to hide the board, but she seizes it and berates him for playing a foolish game. After the King changes to the hussar uniform, they set off for the Queen's departure ceremony. (Curtain)

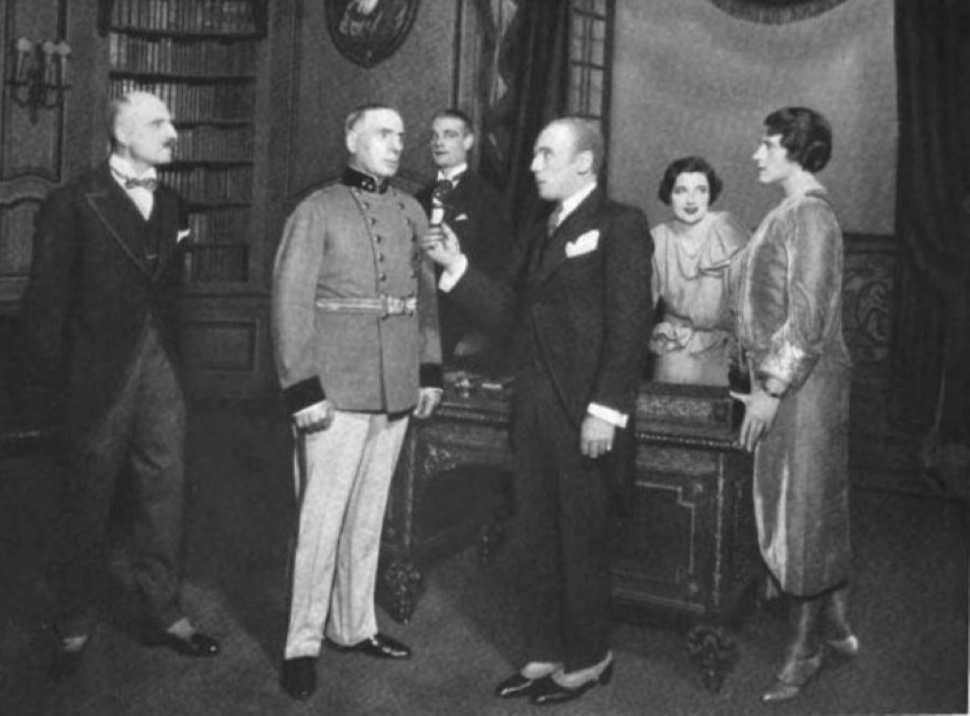

Act II (Same as Act I. Evening, two months later.) The Queen is still in America. Northrup has provoked the opposition into rioting over unemployment. He then uses the Army to suppress the protesters, hoping they will rebel. They oblige, but prove stronger than expected, forcing their way to the palace. Northrup and Birten are alarmed by the romance between Granton and Princess Anne, as it will upset the planned wedding with Prince William and alliance with the Empire of Greck. Princess Anne pleads with her father not to force this wedding upon her. He tries to console her but is unsure he can do anything about the wedding. Northrup now threatens to turn the Navy's big guns against the revolt, but the King countermands this. Instead he summons Dr. Fellman and Laker to the palace with Major Blent as an escort. Under flag of truce, they meet and a ceasefire is agreed. Dr. Fellman explains their main concern is unemployment. Upon assurance the Queen's fund-raising will help alleviate the problem, they have their forces stand down. (Curtain)

Act III (Same as Act I. Morning, a week later.) Prince William and Princess Anne meet for the first time; she finds him repellent. When Granton intrudes, the Prince is amused at their obvious relationship and angers them both by saying he will not object after the wedding. The Queen, returned from America, is upset with the King for not having backed Northrup, and for allowing Grafton to woo Anne. The King speaks of their own wedding; he realizes she loved someone else when they married. The King orders Phipps to summon Northrup, Birten, Dr. Fellman, and Laker. The King stuns everyone by announcing he has read the constitution, and will exercise his powers under it. He tells Northrup that Parliament is immediately dissolved. Northrup is irate and resigns, which the King accepts. The King then asks Dr. Fellman to form a new government, mollifying Laker who guarantees no interference with the royal wedding. The Queen sets off for the cathedral where Prince William waits. When all have left, the King has Major Blent bring in Granton and Princess Anne. As head of the national church, the King officiates over their quick wedding. Then as head of state, he orders Granton and his wife deported. Major Blent will escort them aboard a ship departing within the hour and return on the pilot boat. The King sets out for the cathedral, where all expect him to bring the Princess. He apprehensively tells Phipps he will return shortly. (Curtain)

== Original production ==
=== Background ===
William A. Brady Jr and Dwight Deere Wiman had produced Robert E. Sherwood's first play, The Road to Rome, a long-running hit on Broadway. They did not have anything to do with Sherwood's second play, The Love Nest, adapted from a 1925 Ring Lardner short story, which lasted two weeks on Broadway.

Brady and Wiman had offices in the Playhouse Theatre, owned by Brady's father, William A. Brady. The Road to Rome, currently playing there, would be closing in early January 1928, freeing the venue for The Queen's Husband. The production was announced in mid December 1927, with the leads identified as Roland Young and Katharine Alexander. John Cromwell was chosen as director, Livingston Platt as set designer, and rehearsals called for December 20, 1927. The producers next announced Gyles Isham, Gladys Hanson, and Reginald Barlow for the supporting cast. A two-day tryout was reported to be set in Providence, Rhode Island for January 23, 1928.

=== Cast ===
The cast from Broadway premiere through the closing.
Role	Actor	Dates	Notes and sources
Princess Anne	Katharine Alexander	Jan 25, 1928 - May 12, 1928	Alexander was married to co-producer William A. Brady Jr.
King Eric VIII	Roland Young	Jan 25, 1928 - May 12, 1928	Young's own hobby of collecting penguins was inserted into the play by Sherwood.
Frederick Granton	Gyles Isham	Jan 25, 1928 - May 12, 1928	
Phipps	Edward Rigby	Jan 25, 1928 - May 12, 1928	
Lord Birten	William Widdicombe	Jan 25, 1928 - May 12, 1928	
Queen Martha	Gladys Hanson	Jan 25, 1928 - May 12, 1928	
General Northrup	Reginald Barlow	Jan 25, 1928 - May 12, 1928	
Petley	James H. Morrison	Jan 25, 1928 - May 12, 1928	
Lady-in-waiting	Marguerite Taylor	Jan 25, 1928 - May 12, 1928	She was the daughter of Laurette Taylor, making her Broadway debut at age 17.
Another lady-in-waiting	Helen Cromwell	Jan 25, 1928 - May 12, 1928	
Major Blent	William Boren	Jan 25, 1928 - May 12, 1928	
Sergeant	John M. James	Jan 25, 1928 - May 12, 1928	
Dr. Fellman	Arthur Hughes	Jan 25, 1928 - May 12, 1928	
Prince William	Dwight Frye	Jan 25, 1928 - Apr 28, 1928	Frye left for a revival of One Man's Woman in Chicago.
Prince William	TBD	Apr 30, 1928 - May 12, 1928	
Laker	Benedict MacQuarrie	Jan 25, 1928 - May 12, 1928	

=== Broadway premiere and reception ===
“The spectacle of a monarch playing checkers with a frog-like flunkey who is none too trustful of his master's ethics is both concrete and entertaining.... And as the humorless disdainful flunkey, Edward Rigby comes straight from Lewis Carroll.” – Brooks Atkinson on The Queen's Husband

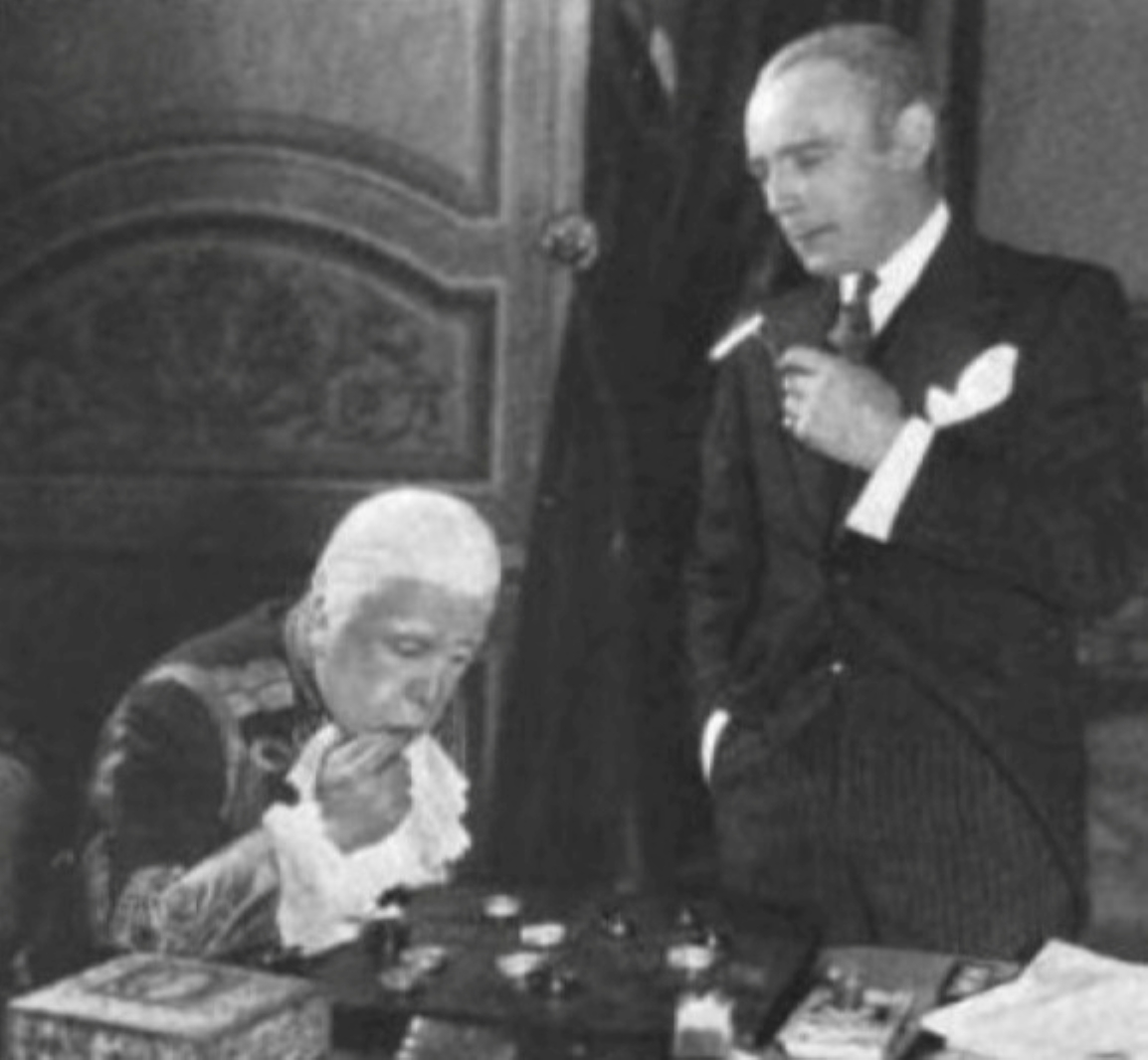

The production had its Broadway premiere at the Playhouse Theatre on January 25, 1928. Ray Harper said the play had strong first and third acts, but the second was marred by the playwright trying "to be satirically funny and at the same time serious and preachy". Harper ascribed acting honors to Roland Young, with nods to Katharine Alexander and especially Dwight Frye as Prince William. Rowland Field was convinced the play lampooned the recent visit of Queen Marie of Romania to America and said the story centered "around the activities of royalty in the Balkans". Field omitted these opinions in a follow-up article several days later, when he echoed Ray Harper's comments about the shifting moods of the play's center portion.

Edward Dobson, perhaps misled by the play's title, thought King Eric was "the royal consort" instead of the sovereign, which colored his appreciation of the storyline. He reported the first night audience was amused and entertained but confused over the changes in mood of the play. Burns Mantle also compared the fictional Queen Martha's trip to America with the real Queen Marie. He judged the play would not run as long as The Road to Rome, but was well cast with Roland Young as the timid king. Brooks Atkinson said in The Queen's Husband that Sherwood was "fickle in his moods" and "bewildering in his transitions". Atkinson said the play talked "solemnly of politics and economics" but ends in romance. He concluded that the ingredients did not blend well, but individual scenes showed some strength.

=== Broadway closing ===
The Queen's Husband closed at the Playhouse Theatre on May 12, 1928, after 125 performances.

== Adaptations ==
=== Film ===
- The Royal Bed - 1931 early sound film adaptation by J. Walter Ruben.

=== Radio ===
- The Queen's Husband - A CBS Radio Theater hourlong adaptation that aired December 30, 1935, starring Frank Morgan and his niece, Claudia Morgan.

=== Television ===
- The Queen's Husband - A 1946 British Broadcasting Corporation production, starring Barry Jones and Sheila Sim. It was broadcast several times, starting September 10, 1946.

== Bibliography ==
- Burns Mantle (ed). The Best Plays of 1927-28 And The Year Book Of The Drama In America. Dodd, Mead and Company, 1928.
- Robert E. Sherwood. The Queen's Husband. Charles Scribner's Sons, 1928.
- Robert E. Sherwood, adapted by Nathaniel Edward Reeid. The Queen's Husband: A Comedy in Three Acts. Longmans, Green and Company, 1929.
