= The Little Adventuress (1938 film) =

1938 film

- Directed by: D. Ross Lederman
- Written by: Michael L. Simmons; Paul Jarrico
- Starring: Edith Fellows
- Cinematography: Henry Freulich
- Edited by: Al Clark
- Distributed by: Columbia Pictures
- Release date: December 9, 1938
- Running time: 60 minutes
- Country: United States
- Language: English

The Little Adventuress is a 1938 American adventure film directed by D. Ross Lederman.

== Cast ==
- Edith Fellows as Pinky Horton
- Richard Fiske as Dick Horton
- Julie Bishop as Helen Gould (as Jacqueline Wells)
- Cliff Edwards as Handy
- Virginia Howell as Aunt Hattie
- Harry C. Bradley as Henry Lowell
- Charles Waldron as Herkimer Gould
- Kenneth Harlan as Tom Eagan
