= Paul Osborn =

American playwright and screenwriter (1901–1988)

- Born: September 4, 1901; Evansville, Indiana, US
- Died: May 12, 1988 (aged 86); US
- Education: University of Michigan
- Occupations: Playwright, screenwriter
- Writing career
- Genre: Drama

Paul Osborn (September 4, 1901 – May 12, 1988) was an American playwright and screenwriter. Osborn's original plays are The Vinegar Tree, Oliver Oliver, and Morning's at Seven and among his several successful adaptations, On Borrowed Time has proved particularly popular. He wrote the screenplays for East of Eden (1955) and South Pacific (1958), among other films.

== Career ==
Born in Evansville, Indiana, he grew up in Michigan where his father was a Baptist minister. He went on to graduate from the University of Michigan. At the university, he formed a lasting friendship with Poet-in-Residence Robert Frost and earned a B.A. in English and an M.A. in psychology. Following a brief stint as a student of George Pierce Baker, the noted teacher of dramatic form and founder of the Yale School of Drama at Yale University, he made his debut on Broadway in 1928 with the play Hotbed. His next play A Ledge was produced the following season.

In 1930, Osborn found singular success on Broadway with a comedy titled The Vinegar Tree that starred Mary Boland. He contributed the comedy Oliver Oliver to the 1934 Broadway season, and in 1984 that play won critical acclaim at the Long Wharf Theater and the Philadelphia Drama Guild with Boyd Gaines in the title role. On the opening night in New Haven, the audience gave Oliver Oliver a standing ovation; and Osborn, who suffered macular degeneration, quipped, "I thought they were standing to get their coats."

Although often noted for his adaptations, Osborn's 1939 comedy, Morning's at Seven, became one of Osborn's most enduring original works. It was revived on Broadway in 1980, directed by Vivian Matalon, featuring a cast including Teresa Wright, Maureen O'Sullivan, Nancy Marchand and Elizabeth Wilson. It was hailed by Harold Clurman "as one of the best American comedies" Morning's at Seven has been presented several times on television, including a version directed by Matalon. In 2002, the Lincoln Center Theater mounted a well-received production with Elizabeth Franz, Frances Sternhagen, Piper Laurie and Estelle Parsons as the four sisters. The play received numerous nominations for awards, as did the acting ensemble, with Elizabeth Franz cited in particular

Osborn's dramatization of On Borrowed Time has had three productions on Broadway, Joshua Logan directed the premiere in 1938 with Dudley Digges, Frank Conroy and Dorothy Stickney leading the cast. The 1953 revival featured Victor Moore, Leo G. Carroll and Beulah Bondi; and in 1991 George C. Scott directed himself, Nathan Lane and Teresa Wright in the play. The 1939 MGM movie of On Borrowed Time stars Lionel Barrymore, Cedric Hardwicke and Bobs Watson and Beulah Bondi. Osborn's rich contribution to the American theater includes the adaptations A Bell for Adano (1944); Point of No Return; The World of Susie Wong; The Innocent Voyage; and an original verse play, based on Greek myths, Maiden Voyage.

Paul Osborn had a gift for friendship: Al Hirschfeld, Elia Kazan, Robert Frost. Frost, while becoming America's most noted poet, remained a close friend, intrigued by theater and travelling to New York for Osborn's first nights. Frost hoped to write a play in collaboration with his former student.

Tomorrow's Monday, a somewhat autobiographical play, was written in 1935–36. It was first produced at the Brattleboro Theatre in Vermont, in the summer of 1936 and had its New York premiere fifty years later at the Circle Repertory Company in the fall of 1985. According to Kent Paul, who directed that production, Al Hirschfeld, the New York Times theater artist, remarked to his friend Osborn, "I like Tomorrow's Monday even more than Morning's at Seven."

Elia Kazan, in his autobiography A Life, credits Osborn with guiding him to the section of the novel East of Eden to film as well as discovering James Dean for the film. In his documentary A Letter to Elia, Martin Scorsese argues that the little known Wild River, which stars Montgomery Clift, Lee Remick and Jo Van Fleet, is among Kazan's finest achievements. Osborn's screenplay for Wild River is an outstanding literary achievement, providing scope for Kazan's directorial imagination.

Rodgers & Hammerstein and the director Joshua Logan first asked Osborn to write the book for South Pacific when it was done for the stage (Logan himself finally did it), and achieved their objective when Osborn agreed to make the screenplay.

Paul Osborn and his wife Millicent, a fiction writer, lived in New York City. Before their marriage in 1939 (Osborn's second), Millicent Green had had a successful career as an actress on Broadway, in the 1928 production of Machinal with Clark Gable and in Street Scene (1931), a performance that is captured in a Hirschfeld drawing included in his book with Brooks Atkinson, The Lively Years 1920 - 1973 (Morning's at Seven is one of the plays cited and discussed.) Problems with his eyesight left Osborn virtually blind his latter years when he dictated a lengthy memoir that he never finished "because I can't read it". The memoir remains unpublished.

Among his screenplays would be the adaptation of John Steinbeck's East of Eden (1955) and Wild River (1960) for his friend Elia Kazan, South Pacific (1958) and Sayonara directed by Joshua Logan, as well as Madame Curie (1943), The Yearling (1946), and Portrait of Jennie (1948). He had received Academy Award nominations for the screenplays for Sayonara and East of Eden, and Writers Guild of America nominations for South Pacific, Sayonara and East of Eden.

Osborn received a Tony Award for Best Broadway Revival in 1980 for Morning's at Seven. In 1982, two years after the Tony for Morning's at Seven, Osborn won the Laurel Award for Screenwriting Achievement from the Writers Guild of America.
