= She Married Her Boss =

1935 film by Gregory La Cava

- Theatrical poster
- Directed by: Gregory La Cava
- Screenplay by: Sidney Buchman; Gregory La Cava
- Story by: Thyra Samter Winslow
- Produced by: Everett Riskin
- Starring: Claudette Colbert; Melvyn Douglas; Raymond Walburn
- Cinematography: Leon Shamroy
- Edited by: Richard Cahoon
- Music by: Louis Silvers
- Color process: Black and white
- Production company: Columbia Pictures
- Distributed by: Columbia Pictures
- Release date: September 19, 1935
- Running time: 88 minutes
- Country: United States
- Language: English

She Married Her Boss is a 1935 American comedy film directed by Gregory La Cava and starring Claudette Colbert, Melvyn Douglas and Raymond Walburn. It was produced and distributed by Columbia Pictures. The film was a commercial success.

== Plot ==
Julia Scott is a very efficient secretary at a department store. She is in love with her boss, Richard Barclay, who pays no attention to her, unless it has to do with business. Julia goes to lunch with Martha Pryor, who tells her she has been offered a manager position of a department store in Paris. She turns it down, because of her love for Richard. Business forces Julia and Richard to work late at his house. Julia meets Richard's sister, Gertrude, and his daughter, Annabel, who is a very spoiled, out-of-control child. Richard lets Julia take over the house for a couple of hours, in which she "straightens out" the household. Afterwards, she regrets all that she did at Richard's house. She turns to Martha, who says she will take care of everything. Martha talks to Richard the next day, telling him that Julia is leaving and taking the job in Paris. Richard is very upset and wants to know why. She struggles to come up with excuses, and they take the afternoon off, during which Richard and Julia are married. When Julia insists on being carried over the threshold of his home. Gertrude is not happy, and insists the marriage will not last.

The next day, Julia decides to stay home and attend to business there. The office is a complete disaster that day, in complete chaos. Meanwhile, Annabel has refused to eat anything while Julia is in the house, but Julia continues to outsmart and befriend her, along with Rodgers, a prospective business partner. Gertrude continues to try and ruin the marriage. While Julia and Rodgers are working, Annabel enters, and they all start singing. Richard comes home and is very upset with Julia. He would rather have her helping him get the business deal with Rodgers. Julia decides to go to Philadelphia and "get the Rodgers place in order." But after a while Annabelle wants Julia to come home, so Richard decides to go bring his wife back. The night before he arrives, Julia and Rodgers drink heavily and spend the night in the store front window singing. Richard sees photos of the incident in the newspaper, and storms out of Julia's hotel room after she insists he cares more about the store than about her.

Julia feels the marriage is over and makes plans for a cruise to Cuba and Panama with Rodgers. As she stops by home to pick up her things, Annabel begs her to stay. Richard, usually a teetotaller, has been getting drunk with his butler. When he finds out Julia is in the house, he confronts her drunkenly, then pretends to have a gun in his pocket and forces her into a car being driven by the intoxicated butler. The car careens through the city to a brickyard, where Richard picks up bricks, and then returns to the store. Both he and Julia throw bricks through the store window, laughing. As the police chase them, they rush to the pier, with the goal of departing on the cruise to Cuba together.

== Cast ==
- Claudette Colbert as Julia Scott
- Melvyn Douglas as Richard Barclay
- Michael Bartlett as Lennie Rogers
- Raymond Walburn as Franklin
- Jean Dixon as Martha Pryor
- Katharine Alexander as Gertrude Barclay
- Edith Fellows as Annabel Barclay
- Clara Kimball Young as Parsons
- Grace Hayle as Agnes Mayo
- Charles Arnt as Victor Jessup
- John Hyams as Hoyt
- Georgia Caine as Fitzpatrick
- Selmer Jackson as Andrews
- Buddy Roosevelt as Edwards - Chauffeur
- Franklin Pangborn as Window Dresser
- Lillian Rich as Telephone Operator

== See also ==
- List of American films of 1935
