= Pennies from Heaven (1936 film) =

1936 film by Norman Z. McLeod, Jo Swerling

- DVD cover
- Directed by: Norman Z. McLeod
- Screenplay by: Jo Swerling
- Story by: William Rankin
- Based on: The Peacock Feather; 1913 novel by Katherine Leslie Moore
- Produced by: Emanuel Cohen
- Starring: Bing Crosby; Madge Evans; Louis Armstrong; Edith Fellows
- Cinematography: Robert Pittack
- Edited by: John Rawlins
- Music by: William Grant Still (uncredited); Georgie Stoll (Music Director); Arrangements by John Scott Trotter
- Production company: Emanuel Cohen Productions
- Distributed by: Columbia Pictures
- Release date: November 25, 1936 (USA)
- Running time: 81 minutes
- Country: United States
- Language: English

Pennies From Heaven is a 1936 American musical comedy film directed by Norman Z. McLeod and starring Bing Crosby, Madge Evans, and Edith Fellows. Jo Swerling's screenplay was based on the novel The Peacock Feather by Katherine Leslie Moore.

Pennies From Heaven remains most noteworthy for Crosby's introduction of the titular song, a Depression-era favorite, since recorded by numerous singers. The film features Louis Armstrong in a supporting role. In 1937, the film received an Oscar nomination for Best Original Song (Arthur Johnston and Johnny Burke).

This was Crosby's first independent production jointly with Emanuel Cohen's Major Pictures and he had a share in the profits. The film was distributed by Columbia Pictures.

== Plot ==
Larry Poole is a wandering troubadour, having once stowed away on a freighter that turned out to be a smuggling ship. His involvement sends him to prison, where he is approached by inmate J. C. Hart, who is on his way to the electric chair. Hart asks Larry to deliver a letter to a family called Smith near Middletown, New Jersey. After finding the family, which consists of a grandfather and a young girl named Patsy, Poole tells them that the letter holds a key, reveals that the condemned man had unintentionally killed Patsy's father, and that he is giving the Smith family his old house and former hideout, the only thing he has to give as atonement.

Susan Sprague represents the county welfare department and it is her job to see that Patsy is raised "properly", or the girl will go to an orphanage. Various misadventures befall Larry as he tries to help "Gramps" out with Patsy to save her from the orphanage, all while he and Susan are reluctantly falling in love.

To get cash for a restaurant license, Larry gets a stunt job at the circus, but is injured. While he is in the hospital, Gramps comes to let him know that the county has taken Patsy away. Larry believes Susan went behind his back and had Patsy placed in the orphanage. It is discovered that Susan had no part in it, and she loses her job defending Larry and his care of the child.

When Patsy lets Larry know how Susan feels about him, Larry has the circus perform at the orphanage so that he can "break Patsy out". The escape plan fails. Afterward, Larry finds out that Susan has gone to New York and he follows her there. So do two detectives, who escort Larry and Susan back to the orphanage.

The head of the welfare department begs Larry to help them with Patsy, who has gone on a hunger strike and has already destroyed orphanage property. Larry agrees to adopt Patsy and raise her with the help of Susan, who agrees to marry him and be a mother to Patsy.

== Cast ==
- Bing Crosby as Larry Poole
- Madge Evans as Susan Sprague
- Edith Fellows as Patsy Smith
- Louis Armstrong ¤ as Henry
- Donald Meek as Gramps Smith
- John Gallaudet as J. C. Hart
- William Stack as Clarence B. Carmichael
- Nana Bryant as Miss Howard
- Tom Dugan as Crowbar Miller
- Stanley Andrews as Detective Stephens
- Stanley Blystone as Detective Gilroy
- George Chandler as Waiter
- Charles C. Wilson as Prison Warden
- Nydia Westman as Chambermaid

¤ Although this was not the first time that a black performer was given prominent billing in a major Hollywood release (Paul Robeson had been billed fourth in that same year's Show Boat), special billing was given to Armstrong at the insistence of Bing Crosby, who also insisted on Armstrong's being hired for the movie.

== Reception ==
Frank S. Nugent of The New York Times commented, "Conceding that Mr. Crosby is as good-natured as ever and that Miss Evans is so attractive a social worker that we are tempted to apply for relief and be investigated, the chief honors properly belong to little Miss Fellows. Hers really is an exceptional performance for a youngster, skirting the perils of bathos in her tender scenes and playing her rebellious ones with comic impertinence. Mr. Meek as the grandfather, Nana Bryant as the harried superintendent of an orphanage, and William Stack as a welfare commissioner are excellent in the supporting rôles. In sum, Pennies from Heaven is one of Mr. Crosby's best."

Variety wrote, "The sentimental troubadour character which has come to identify Bing Crosby on the screen is well catered to in this whimsical musical comedy. It is oddly romantic, has good general entertainment merit, variety of ingredients, and music of high quality. Nature of the material, with well-calculated appeal to juvenile audiences, heads it for most favorable reception in the family spots. The Crosby fans will like it. It should give [a] good account of itself."

Newspaper critics generally remarked about the film's loose structure and mild storyline, but the trade papers welcomed the film. Boxoffice reported, "Pennies from Heaven will mean dollars for the box office, what with Bing Crosby crooning as catchy a batch of tunes as has ever been written for one of his pictures, in a delightful hodgepodge of music and laughs that spells entertainment for any fan's time and money." The Hollywood Reporter agreed: "With Bing Crosby in a warmly appealing role that gives him opportunity for four melodious new songs, and a story background rich with homely sentiment and natural comedy, this Emanuel Cohen picture will have large mass appeal. Many will rank it as Crosby's best and its box office returns will be big."

== Soundtrack ==
- "Pennies from Heaven" (Arthur Johnston and Johnny Burke) played during the opening credits, as background music, and sung by Bing Crosby
- "Skeleton in the Closet" (Arthur Johnston and Johnny Burke) by Louis Armstrong and His Band
- "So Do I" (Arthur Johnston and Johnny Burke) by Bing Crosby and danced by Edith Fellows; reprised by Crosby at the orphanage and in the New York City montage
- "One, Two, Button Your Shoe" (Arthur Johnston and Johnny Burke) by Bing Crosby at the orphanage; reprised by a marching band
- "Let's Call a Heart a Heart" (Arthur Johnston and Johnny Burke) by Bing Crosby with Louis Armstrong and His Band; played also as background music
- "Old MacDonald Had a Farm" (Traditional) by Bing Crosby, Edith Fellows, and Donald Meek on the hay wagon

Bing Crosby recorded his solos for Decca Records. They all enjoyed chart successes with "Pennies from Heaven" topping the hit parade for ten weeks. Crosby's songs were also included in the Bing's Hollywood series.

== Awards ==
Arthur Johnston and Johnny Burke were nominated for the Academy Award for Best Original Song for the music and lyrics respectively of "Pennies from Heaven".

The film is recognized by American Film Institute in these lists:

- 2004: AFI's 100 Years...100 Songs:
  - "Pennies from Heaven" – Nominated

== Revivals ==
Columbia re-released Pennies from Heaven to theaters in May 1949. The original negative was consulted so often for reprints and TV broadcasts that it became unusable, and by 1981 Columbia Pictures Television had to copy a second-generation, 16mm positive print, with some loss of sharpness and detail. The lesser quality is why the film was never issued on VHS videotape. Columbia has since located original 35mm materials on Pennies from Heaven, and has restored the film to its original definition. This reassembled version was the source of Columbia's 2003 DVD release.
