= Katharine Alexander =

American actress (1897–1981)

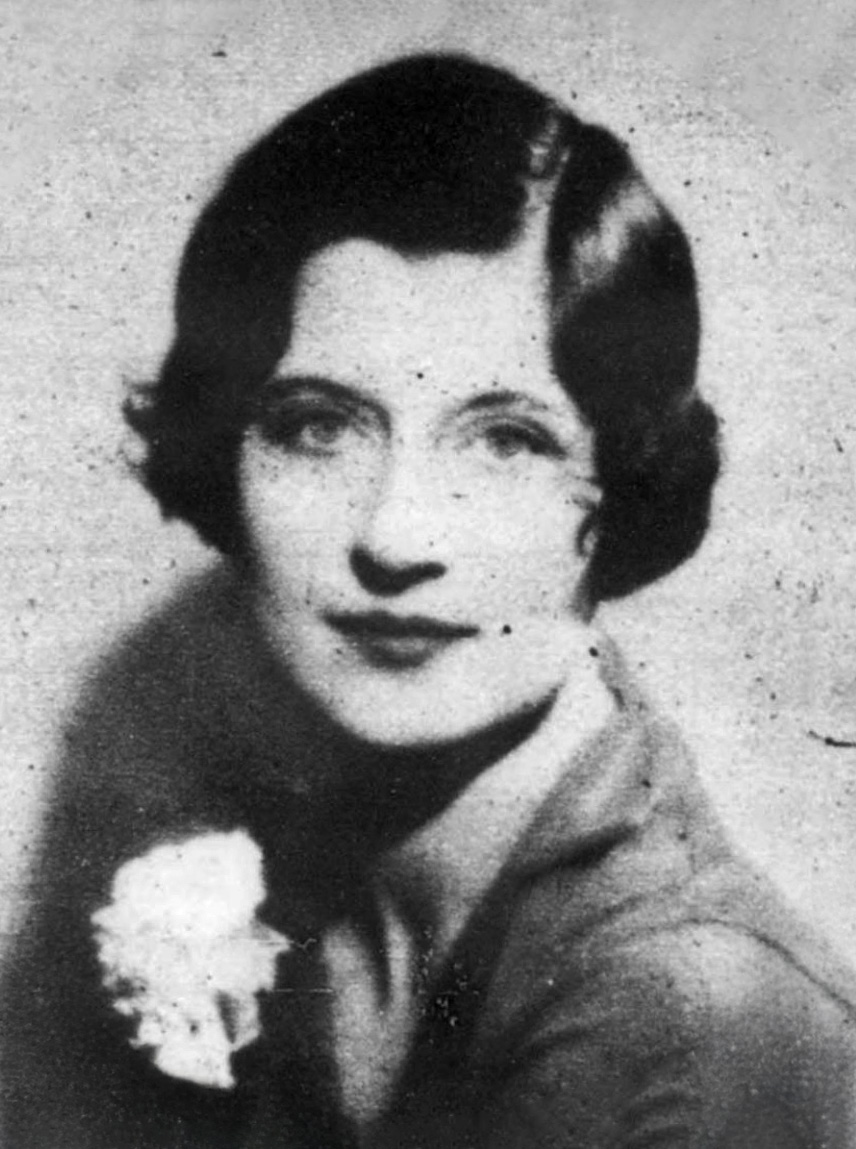
- Alexander while performing "Little Accident" in 1929
- Born: September 22, 1897; Fort Smith, Arkansas, U.S.
- Died: January 10, 1981 (aged 83); Tryon, North Carolina, U.S.
- Other name: Katherine Alexander
- Occupation: Actress
- Years active: 1930–1951
- Spouse: William A. Brady Jr. (m. 1926; died 1935)
- Children: 1

Katharine Alexander (sometimes Katherine; September 22, 1897 – January 10, 1981) was an American actress on stage and screen. She appeared in 44 films between 1930 and 1951.

== Biography ==
Alexander was born on September 22, 1897, in Fort Smith, Arkansas, the daughter of Joseph Hall "Josiah" Alexander and Susan Sophronia Duncan. She was an enrolled citizen of the Cherokee Nation, listed as 1/16th Cherokee on the Dawes Rolls. As a young woman, she planned to be a concert artist, but Samuel Goldwyn saw her giving a violin recital and gave her a chance on stage. She became one of Broadway's leading ladies but went into films in 1930.

== Theatrical productions ==
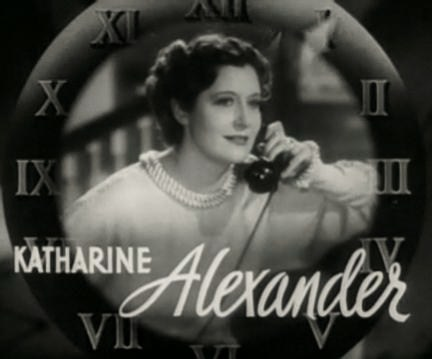
Alexander in the trailer for After Office Hours (1935)

Alexander debuted on stage in A Successful Calamity with William Gillette.

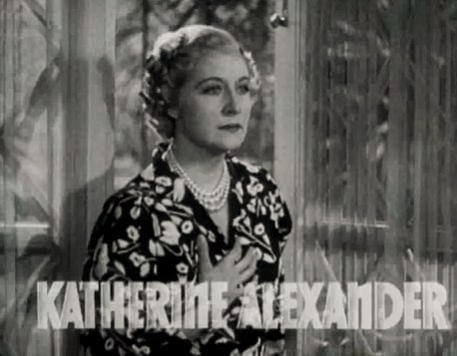
Moonlight Murder trailer (1936)

Her Broadway credits included Time for Elizabeth (1948), Little Brown Jug (1946), Letters to Lucerne (1941), The Party's Over (1933), Honeymoon (1932), Best Years (1932), The Left Bank (1931), Stepdaughters of War (1930), Hotel Universe (1930), The Boundary Line (1930), Little Accident (1929), The Queen's Husband (1928), Hangman's House (1926), Gentle Grafters (1926), The Call of Life (1925), Arms and the Man (1925), It All Depends (1925), Ostriches (1925), The Stork (1925), That Awful Mrs. Eaton (1924), Leah Kleschna (1924), Chains (1923), Love Laughs (1919), Good Morning, Judge (1919), and A Successful Calamity (1917).

== Personal life ==
On January 5, 1926, Alexander married producer William A. Brady Jr. in New York City. Brady was the son of William A. Brady a theatre actor, producer, and sports promoter; and the actress Grace George. They had a daughter, Barbara Alexander Brady, who became an actress.

== Death ==
Alexander died in Tryon, North Carolina on January 10, 1981, aged 82. She was buried in the Fairmount addition to Forest Park Cemetery in her native Fort Smith.

== Partial filmography ==
- Should Ladies Behave (1933) as Mrs. Winifred Lamont
- Death Takes a Holiday (1934) as Alda
- The Barretts of Wimpole Street (1934) as Arabel Barrett
- Operator 13 (1934) as Pauline
- The Painted Veil (1934) as Mrs. Townsend
- Enchanted April (1935) as Mrs. Rose Arbuthnot
- After Office Hours (1935) as Julia Patterson
- Cardinal Richelieu (1935) as Queen Anne
- Alias Mary Dow (1935) as Evelyn Dow
- The Girl from 10th Avenue (1935) as Valentine French Marland
- Ginger (1935) as Mrs. Elizabeth Parker
- She Married Her Boss (1935) as Gertrude Barclay
- Splendor (1935) as Martha Lorrimore
- Sutter's Gold (1936) as Anna Sutter
- Moonlight Murder (1936) as Louisa Chiltern
- The Devil Is a Sissy (1936) as Hilda Pierce
- Reunion (1936) as Mrs. Crandall
- As Good as Married (1937) as Alma Burnside
- The Girl from Scotland Yard (1937) as Lady Helen Lavering
- That Certain Woman (1937) as Mrs. Rogers
- Stage Door (1937) as Cast of Stage Play
- Double Wedding (1937) as Claire Lodge
- Rascals (1938) as Mrs. Agatha Adams
- The Great Man Votes (1939) as Miss Billow
- Broadway Serenade (1939) as Harriet Ingalls
- In Name Only (1939) as Laura
- Three Sons (1939) as Abigail Pardway
- The Hunchback of Notre Dame (1939) as Madame de Lys
- Anne of Windy Poplars (1940) as Ernestine Pringle
- Dance, Girl, Dance (1940) as Miss Olmstead
- Play Girl (1941) as Mrs. Dice
- Sis Hopkins (1941) as Clara Hopkins
- Angels with Broken Wings (1941) as Charlotte Lord
- The Vanishing Virginian (1942) as Marcia Marshall
- On the Sunny Side (1942) as Mrs. Mary Andrews
- Small Town Deb (1942) as Mrs. Randall
- Now, Voyager (1942) as Miss Trask
- The Human Comedy (1943) as Mrs. Steed
- Kiss and Tell (1945) as Janet Archer
- For the Love of Mary (1948) as Miss Harkness
- John Loves Mary (1949) as Phyllis McKinley
