= You Came Along =

1945 film by John Farrow

- Film poster
- Directed by: John Farrow
- Screenplay by: Robert Smith (original); Ayn Rand (rewrite)
- Based on: "Don't Ever Grieve Me" (story) by Robert Smith
- Produced by: Hal B. Wallis
- Starring: Robert Cummings; Lizabeth Scott; Don DeFore
- Cinematography: Daniel L. Fapp
- Edited by: Eda Warren
- Music by: Victor Young
- Production company: Hal Wallis Productions, Inc.
- Distributed by: Paramount Pictures
- Release dates: August 2, 1945 (Los Angeles); September 14, 1945 (U.S.)
- Running time: 102–103 minutes
- Country: United States
- Language: English

You Came Along (working title Don't Ever Grieve Me) is a 1945 romantic comedy-drama film set in World War II, directed by John Farrow. The original Robert Smith screenplay was rewritten by Ayn Rand. You Came Along stars Robert Cummings and in her film debut, Lizabeth Scott.

The plot involves a US Army Air Forces (USAAF) officer who tries to hide his terminal medical condition from a U.S. Treasury Department public relations staff member, whom he just met before a war bond drive. They become romantically involved, agreeing it's "just fun up in the air." When she finds out the truth, she makes a fateful decision to make the most of the little time they have together. (Note: The "meet cute" storyline is typical of "screwball comedies" of the 1930s.) Filmink called it "a guy cry movie".

You Came Along opens with a stanza from the poem "The Sermon of St. Francis" by Henry Wadsworth Longfellow:

"He giveth you your wings to fly
And breathe a purer air on high,
And careth for you everywhere,
Who for yourselves so little care!"

== Plot ==
During World War II, three highly decorated USAAF officers return to Washington, D.C. after a combat tour in Europe: Major Robert "Bob" Collins (Robert Cummings), Captain W. "Shakespeare" Anders (Don DeFore) and Lieutenant R. "Handsome" Janoschek (Charles Drake). (Note: "Bob Collins," was also the name of the former World War II pilot Cummings would portray in his popular television series, The Bob Cummings Show (1955–1959).) Shakespeare and Handsome are assigned to fly cross-country in a Beech C-45 Expeditor for a war bond tour. Bob, at first is not allowed to accompany them. (Note: In real life, Cummings toured the US during the war selling bonds.)

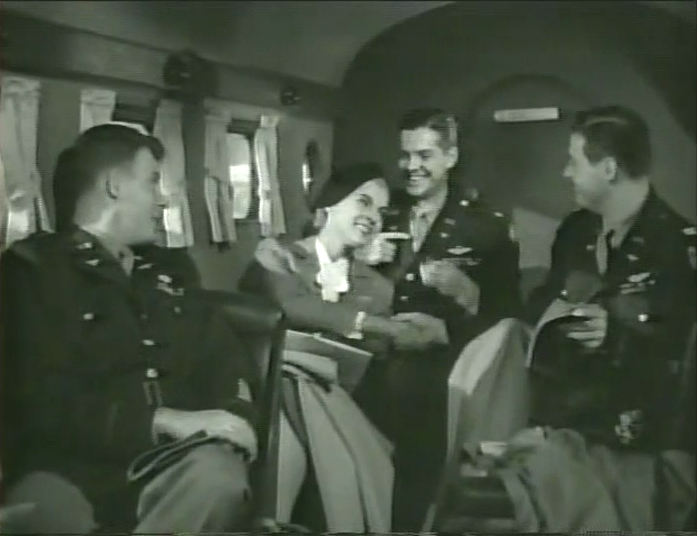
Ivy's truce with Handsome, Bob and Shakespeare

In a running gag, the three officers are expecting to meet "I. V. Hotchkiss," from the Treasury Department. During a press conference at the airport, Bob slips away to find Mr. Hotchkiss who turns out to be Ivy (Lizabeth Scott), a beautiful young woman, whose name was misspelled in Bob's orders. Her boss was injured in a car accident on the way to the airport, so she took over. Bob is incredulous at the idea of an ingénue being the chaperone of three older men, and requests a "briefing room." Despite being miffed at his patronizing attitude, she complies. The airport manager warns that her charges have the appearance of being "wolves," but Ivy replies "But I don't happen to be Little Red Riding Hood."

Returning to the room, Ivy breaks up the kissing session between the officers and their girlfriends, dragging the unwilling men to the aircraft. At first stern and commanding, her demeanor softens somewhat on the flight to Boston as Bob nicknames her "Hotcha."

In Boston, the three officers slip away from the bond drive, forcing Ivy to bring them back from a local nightclub, partying with showgirls in a dressing room. Despite warming up to Ivy, Bob still regards her as a killjoy, but back at the hotel, due to a mixup, he undresses for bed in Ivy's room, unaware that she is already asleep in bed. After Ivy's shock of waking up to the sight of Bob in his underwear, Shakespeare and Handsome rush into Ivy's room, adding to the chaos.

During the flight to Chicago, Ivy discovers that Shakespeare has an injured shoulder and Handsome has a prosthetic leg. When she inquires about Bob, the two men become sullen and evasive. In Chicago, Shakespeare and Handsome attend a fashion show, where they pay 50/50 for an expensive dress sent to Ivy, with a card signed "Anonymous" twice, due to Handsome's insistence that he is entitled to an "Anonymous" too. Later she and the three officers go to a nightclub. (Note: Ivy and Bob dance to the film's theme song, Out of Nowhere (1931)—retitled You Came Along for the film—sung by Helen Forrest.) During the dance, the pair fall in love.

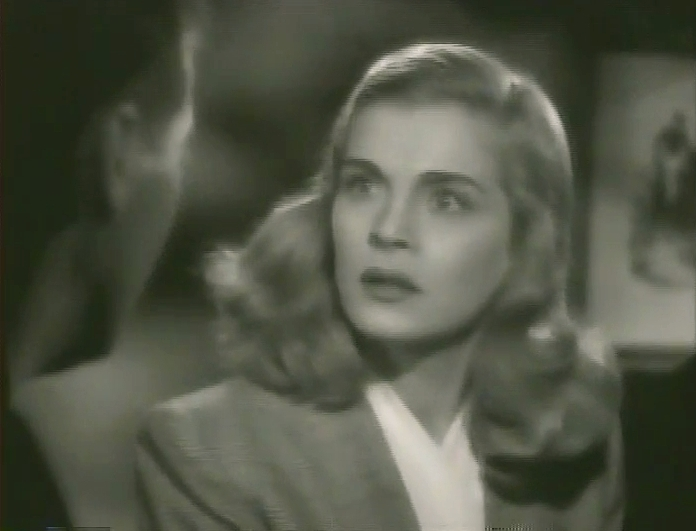
Moment of truth

In Seattle, while in a café with Shakespeare, Ivy sings Out of Nowhere as she plays the piano. By happenstance, a flight surgeon, Colonel Stubbs (Rhys Williams), passes by and recognizes Shakespeare. Stubbs mentions treating an unnamed Air Force officer for leukemia. Although Shakespeare tries to pretend that Stubbs' patient died two weeks previously, Ivy guesses the patient is really Bob and that he does not have long to live. She now realizes why Shakespeare and Handsome never leave Bob alone—they do not want Bob to think about his impending death.

In Riverside, California, at the Mission Inn Fliers' Chapel, Bob attends the wedding of Ivy's sister Frances (Kim Hunter), who marries a naval aviator named Bill Allen (Robert Sully), despite having to leave overseas for combat duty. Frances "tells Ivy that she would marry her navy husband even if she knew he would not return." Inspired by her sister's example, Ivy marries Bob, the couple vowing to live life to the fullest, as long as they can. They buy a house in Long Island, New York, near the air base where Shakespeare, Handsome and Bob will be assigned. Shortly after, Bob is ordered to report to duty overseas. He tells Ivy that he is flying to London.

At the airfield, Bob and Ivy see each other off. While embracing Bob, Ivy spots Colonel Stubbs boarding Bob's flight. Then the truth of the situation hits her. Bob and Ivy agree to "No good-byes". After Bob's aircraft takes off, Ivy asks a ground crew member the direction of London — he points in the opposite direction. At home, Ivy calls Stubbs' office and finds out that he is traveling to Walter Reed Hospital, in Washington D.C.

Stoically, Ivy goes along with the charade and receives letters bearing a British address, which "are cleared through a friend of (Bob's) in England ..."One afternoon, when Shakespeare and Handsome visit Ivy's house to take her out, she receives a telegram reporting Bob's death at the hospital.

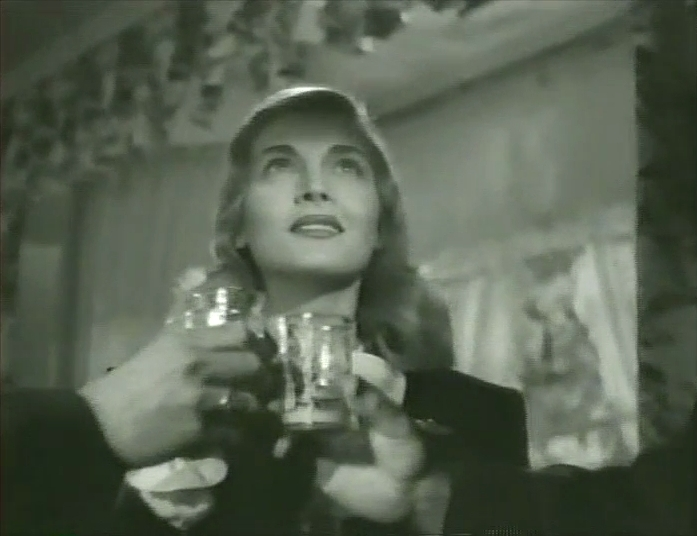
"To the four of us"

After the funeral, Shakespeare and Handsome again stop by Ivy's house and the trio toast Bob. When an aircraft buzzes the neighborhood, Ivy "hears” Bob's voice as if speaking from heaven.

== Cast ==
- Robert Cummings as Major Robert "Bob" Collins, a former engineer in civilian life
- Lizabeth Scott as Ivy "Hotcha" Hotchkiss, a public relations specialist from the US Treasury Department
- Don DeFore as Captain W. Anders, a former Nebraska college instructor nicknamed "Shakespeare"
- Charles Drake as Lieutenant R. Janoschek, a former boxer nicknamed "Handsome"
- Julie Bishop as Mrs. Taylor
- Kim Hunter as Frances Hotchkiss, Ivy's younger sister
- Robert Sully as Bill Allen, Frances' fiancée
- Helen Forrest as herself
- Rhys Williams as Colonel Stubbs, Collins' physician
- Lewis Russell as chairman of the Boston bond drive committee
- Franklin Pangborn as hotel desk clerk
- Hugh Beaumont as army chaplain at Collins' funeral
- Kristine Miller (billed as Jacqueleen Eskeson) as blonde showgirl (Note: Miller made her film debut as the showgirl wearing Bob's cap and mistakes Ivy as "Mrs. Collins." Miller had only one line. "Since (Miller) made her screen debut in the same film as Lizabeth Scott, their careers intersected at various points ..." Miller and Scott would be cast together in four more films.)

== Production ==
=== Screenplay ===
The first version of the screenplay was written by Robert Smith, based on his short story, Don't Ever Grieve Me, which became the working title for the film. Originally conceived as a Barbara Stanwyck vehicle, producer Hal Wallis hired Ayn Rand to rewrite the script. Rand wrote, "As to 'You Came Along', it was originally a very cute story—not profound, but clever and appealing." However, Rand felt Smith's screenplay was badly written. "I kept whatever was good in the original script and wrote the rest; I got second credit which was fine even though I saved it." The Bob Collins character was originally called "Ace" in the Smith–Rand screenplays. Lizabeth Scott's own encounter with Rand would begin a lifelong friendship. Scott would later claim that Rand "was one of the few in Hollywood whom (Scott) felt understood her ability."

The Production Code Administration subjected the screenplay to censorship from the start. Much concern was shown for the "immoral" heterosexual behavior of the three Air Force officers, as well as the alleged homosexuality of the Franklin Pangborn character. As England was a close ally of the US during the war, the American censors were concerned by the anglophobia displayed in the film and warned Paramount that the film would be censored by the British Board of Film Censors.

=== Casting ===
Cummings signed a four-year contract with Wallis in January 1945. The first film was to be Don't Ever Grieve Me.

=== Filming ===
"To remind audiences that You Came Along heralded an actress's debut, Wallis added a separate credit to the main title: Introducing Lizabeth Scott." At the age of 22 in her film debut, Lizabeth Scott was already an experienced stage actress, but was met with skepticism by the production crew. Despite Scott's initial difficulties with Cummings; Jimmie Fidler and other Hollywood columnists reported feuding between Cummings and Scott on the set. She soon gained his respect with her performance and force of personality. After shooting, Cummings even went out of his way to quench rumors that he would never work with Scott again.

Cummings and Scott would again costar in Paid in Full (1950). However, Scott never made any headway with the director, John Farrow. Farrow lobbied for Teresa Wright and when he did not get her, he made his displeasure known to Scott throughout the production. You Came Along, remains, however, Scott's favorite of all the films she made. Scott as late as her 1996 interview, however, remembered John Farrow's hostility toward her on the set.

Production ran February 6–April 6, 1945. The Fliers' Chapel depicted in the film was a replica. Cummings married actress Mary Elliott at the real Fliers' Chapel on March 3, 1945.

A C-45 Expeditor aircraft was used for the air scenes, which were shot at the Metropolitan Airport in Van Nuys, California. Other aircraft that were seen, include Boeing B-17 Flying Fortress bombers, Douglas C-47 Skytrain transport aircraft, Lockheed P-38 Lightning fighters as well as North American AT-6 Texan and Vultee BT-13 Valiant trainers. Julie Bishop was the wife of the film's technical advisor, Colonel Clarence A. Shoop. "Robert Cummings was on leave from the Army Air Corps as a civilian flight instructor to make the film. Director John Farrow, who was sent home wounded in 1941 with the rank of commander in the Royal Canadian Navy, was recalled to service after the completion of this film." Edith Head designed Lizabeth Scott's wardrobe. Head would continue as Scott's principal dress designer to the end of Scott's film career in the late 1950s.

=== Music ===
The theme song of You Came Along, Out of Nowhere (1931), was composed by Johnny Green, with lyrics by Edward Heyman. The song previously appeared in Paramount's western comedy Dude Ranch (1931). The first line of the original lyrics was changed from "You came to me out of nowhere" to "You came along out of nowhere," which provided the title of the 1945 film. A recording sung by Helen Forrest and sheet music were released by Paramount in 1945, both renamed in movie tie-ins, You Came Along (Out of Nowhere). Though Forrest sung the original lyrics in the film and on the record, the changed lyrics appeared in the sheet music and is "sung by an offscreen chorus over the final scene and end title. In the café scene with Don DeFore, Lizabeth Scott herself sings Out of Nowhere as she plays the piano. This would be the first and last time Scott would be permitted in Hollywood to be heard singing with her real voice, despite voice training beginning in childhood. Her singing would be dubbed in all her succeeding films, invariably being dubbed by Trudy Stevens.

=== Radio ===
To promote the film, Lizabeth Scott and Don DeFore reprised their roles in a Lux Radio Theatre broadcast on January 7, 1946, starring Van Johnson in the Cummings role. George N. Neise played Janoschek.

== Reception ==
You Came Along premiered in Los Angeles on August 2, 1945. The most prominent critic of the era, Bosley Crowther of The New York Times, in his review, was not favourably impressed: "To a new and quite clearly inexperienced little actress named Lizabeth Scott is given the job of making the girl in the story seem real. Except that Miss Scott has a fragile and appealingly candid face, she had little else, including script and direction, to help her toward that end. Robert Cummings is glibly mechanical as the hero who is tragically doomed, and Don DeFore and Charles Drake are average cut-ups as his Rover Boyish wolfing-drinking pals." When Crowther's review appeared, Scott recalled, "Being very young and naïve at the time, I didn't know you weren't suppose [sic] to do such things, so I called him up and complained. I told him how hard everyone worked to make such a beautiful movie, and I couldn't understand how he could be so cruel. I must say he took it awfully well, and was very kind to me."

During the shooting of You Came Along, Hal Wallis showed Scott's screen test to Hollywood columnist Bob Thomas. Almost four months before the release of Scott's first film, his March 16, 1945 column was the first to make an unfavorable comparison between Lauren Bacall and Scott, thus beginning a critical trend to marginalize Scott in favor of Bacall: "Her throaty voice may well make Lauren Bacall sound like a mezzo soprano." Wallis told Thomas: "Notice how her eyes are alive and sparkling ... Once in a while she reads a line too fast, but direction will cure that. That voice makes her intriguing." The Thomas meme would continue to haunt Scott's reputation decades later.

Despite the negative reviews by Crowther and Thomas, most critics of the period were positive, praising the film, Robert Cummings' performance and welcoming Hal Wallis' new discovery, Lizabeth Scott. Time described Cummings' performance as "almost flawless."

== See also ==
- Kiss Them for Me (film)
- Kiss Them for Me (play)
