= Secret File: Hollywood =

1962 film

- Theatrical release poster
- Directed by: Rudolph Cusumano
- Written by: Rudolph Cusumano (uncredited); Jack Lewis (story)
- Screenplay by: Jack Lewis
- Produced by: Rudolph Cusumano; James Dyer
- Starring: Robert Clarke; Francine York; Sydney Mason; Maralou Gray; John Warburton
- Cinematography: Gregory Sandor; Ray Dennis Steckler
- Edited by: James Dyer
- Production company: Sherwood Productions
- Distributed by: Crown International Pictures
- Release date: June 6, 1962
- Running time: 85 minutes
- Country: United States
- Language: English

Secret File: Hollywood is a 1962 American crime drama film directed by Rudolph Cusumano, and starring Robert Clarke, Francine York, Sydney Mason, Maralou Gray, and John Warburton. The film marks the onscreen debut of Francine York. The film was released by Crown International Pictures on June 6, 1962.

== Cast ==
- Robert Clarke as Maxwell Carter
- Francine York as Nan Torr
- Sydney Mason as Hap Grogan
- Maralou Gray as Gay Shelton
- John Warburton as Jimmy Cameron
- Bill White
- William Justine
- Martha Mason
- Barbara Skyler
- Eleanor Ames
- Kathy Potter
- John Herman Shaner as Reed
- Diane Strom
- Selime Najjar as Selime
- Shirley Chandler as Jazz Dancer
- Maya Del Mar as Flamenco Dancer
- Carolyn Brandt as Dancer (uncredited)
- Arch Hall Sr. as TV director (uncredited)
- Bill McKinney as Jimmy's Assistant Director (uncredited)
