= Pamela Susan Shoop =

American character actress

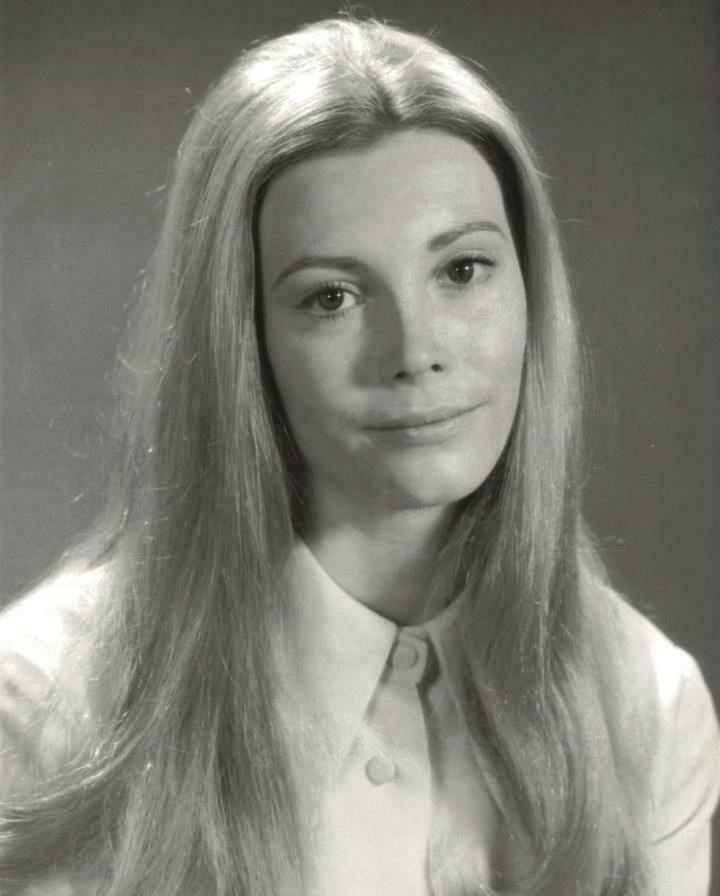
- Shoop in Return to Peyton Place (1973)
- Born: June 7, 1948 (age 78)
- Education: Westlake School for Girls; Beverly Hills High School
- Alma mater: University of Southern California
- Occupations: Actress; Author
- Years active: 1969–2006
- Known for: Halloween II; Empire of the Ants; B.J. and the Bear; Knight Rider
- Television: Return to Peyton Place
- Spouse: Terrance A. Sweeney (m. 1987)
- Parent(s): Clarence A. Shoop; Julie Bishop

Pamela Susan Shoop is an American character actress in films and on television. She often appeared on television series created by Glen A. Larson. She is known for her role in Halloween II (1981) as Nurse Karen Bailey.

== Early years ==
Shoop is the daughter of actress Julie Bishop and test pilot Clarence A. Shoop (who was an executive at Hughes Aircraft Company and commander of the California Air National Guard). As a Major General in World War II, he flew the first photographic reconnaissance mission over Omaha Beach on D-Day.

She was educated at Westlake School for Girls and Beverly Hills High School, graduating in the latter in the class of 1966.

She studied acting at University of Southern California and at Villa Mercede in Florence, Italy, graduating in the class of 1967.

== Career ==
Shoop had her first stage role as the only female in a production of Generation, which opened January 30, 1968 at the Sombrero Playhouse in Phoenix, Arizona. Her father died during the rehearsals, but her mother Julie Bishop, and the play's director and star Robert Cummings, urged her to stay with the week-long production. Her screen debut came in the short film Frog Story.

Shoop's best known film role was in the horror film Halloween II (1981) as Nurse Karen Bailey.

On television, Shoop starred on NBC's Return to Peyton Place as Alison MacKenzie Tate #2 from 1973-1974, taking over the role from Katherine Glass, and she had the role of Miss Dorothy Carlyle on Galactica 1980. She appeared in the pilot episode of Knight Rider ("Knight of the Phoenix") and later on in the season four premiere ("Knight of the Juggernaut"). She also appeared in the pilot episode of Magnum, P.I.

Other guest appearances include The Fall Guy, The Mod Squad, B. J. and the Bear, Buck Rogers in the 25th Century, Simon & Simon, Wonder Woman, The Incredible Hulk and Murder, She Wrote. Shoop's last credited appearance was a 1996 episode of Kung Fu: The Legend Continues, but she continues to attend conventions associated with films in which she appeared. She appeared in the 2006 DVD release Halloween: 25 Years of Terror.

== Personal life ==
On November 15, 1987, Shoop married Terrance Sweeney, a former Jesuit priest, in Pacific Palisades, Los Angeles. Together, they wrote What God Hath Joined (ISBN 034538203X).

Shoop works with charitable groups, including Good Tidings, the National Charity League, and Achievement Rewards for College Scientists.

== Filmography ==
=== Film ===
Year	Title	Role	Notes
1969	Changes	Student Hippie Sculptress	(voice, uncredited)
1972	Frog Story (Short)	Frog girl	
1977	Empire of the Ants	Coreen Bradford	(as Pamela Shoop)
1978	The One Man Jury	Wendy Sommerset	(as Pamela Shoop)
1981	Halloween II	Nurse Karen Bailey	
2006	Halloween: 25 Years of Terror (Video Documentary)	Herself	
2013	The Night She Came Home!! (Video Documentary)	Herself	

=== Television ===
Year	Title	Role	Notes
1970	The Interns (TV Series)	Janet Keller	Episode: "Mondays Can Be Fatal" (1.10)
1972	Night Gallery (TV Series)	Mrs. Foster	Episode: "The Sins of the Fathers/You Can't Get Help Like That Anymore" (as Pamela Shoop)
1972	The F.B.I. (TV Series)	Muriel Davis	Episode: "The Corruptor" (7.23)
1972	The Rookies (TV Series)	Patty Lewis	Episode: "The Bear That Didn't Get Up" (1.7) (as Pamela Shoop)
1972	Mannix (TV Series)	Jan Lachlan	Episode: "To Kill a Memory" (6.7) (as Pamela Shoop)
1972	The Mod Squad (TV Series)	Carol Bridgewater	Episode: "Crime Club" (5.11) (as Pamela Shoop)
1973-1974	Return to Peyton Place (TV Series)	Alison MacKenzie Tate #2	
1976	Switch (TV Series)	Sue Zirk	Episode: "Before the Holocaust" (1.19) (as Pamela Shoop)
1976	Gemini Man (TV Miniseries)	Barby	Episode: "Sam Casey, Sam Casey" (1.3)
1976	Emergency! (TV Series)	Marcia Emerson	Episode: "That Time of Year" (6.4) (as Pamela Shoop)
1976	Wonder Woman (TV Series)	Magda	Episode: "The Feminum Mystique: Part 1" (1.5) (as Pamela Shoop)
1976	Wonder Woman (TV Series)	Magda	Episode: "The Feminum Mystique: Part 2" (1.6) (as Pamela Shoop)
1977	Keeper of the Wild (TV Series)	Holly James	Episode: (1.1)
1977	Code R (TV Series)	Debbie Payton	Episode: "Beauty and the Beach" (1.10)
1977	79 Park Avenue (TV Miniseries)	Angie Harding	
1978	The Incredible Hulk (TV Series)	Carol Abrams	Episode: "Terror in Times Square" (1.6) (as Pamela Shoop)
1978	Kaz (TV Series)	Laura Colcourt	Episode: "A Fine Romance" (1.9)
1979	Battlestar Galactica (TV Series)	IFB Interviewer	Episode: "The Man With Nine Lives" (1.15)
1979	Dallas Cowboys Cheerleaders (TV Movie)	Betty Denton	
1979	Buck Rogers in the 25th Century (TV Series)	Tangie	Episode: "Vegas in Space" (1.3)
1979	Vega$ (TV Series)	Maryann Silverton	Episode: "Runaway" (2.4)
1979	B. J. and the Bear (TV Series)	Alison Spencer	Episode: "Silent Night, Unholy Night" (2.12)
1979	CHiPs ( TV Series)	Alice Piermont	Episode: "Christmas Watch" (3.15)
1980	Buck Rogers in the 25th Century (TV Series)	Tangie	Episode: "A Blast for Buck" (1.14) (uncredited) (archive footage)
1980	Hawaii Five-O (TV Series)	Jennifer Fair	Episode: "School for Assassins" (12.12)
1980	Vega$ (TV Series)	Maryann Silverton	Episode: "The Private Eye Connection" (2.11)
1980	Galactica 1980 (TV Series)	Dorothy Carlyle	Episode: "Galactica Discovers Earth: Part 1" (1.1)
1980	Magnum, P.I. (TV Series)	Alice Cook	Episode: "Don't Eat the Snow in Hawaii" (1.1)
1980	B. J. and the Bear (TV Series)	Dolly Reed	Episode: "The Fast and the Furious: Part 1" (3.3)
1980	B. J. and the Bear (TV Series)	Dolly Reed	Episode: "The Fast and the Furious: Part 2" (3.4)
1981	Fitz and Bones (TV Series)		Episode: "To Kill a Ghost" (1.3)
1981	Fantasy Island (TV Series)	Mira Dutton	Episode: "Lillian Russell/The Lagoon" (5.8)
1981	CHiPs (TV Series)	Chickee	Episode: "Mitchell & Woods" (5.12)
1981	The Fall Guy (TV Series)	Rhonda Starr	Episode: "The Meek Shall Inherit Rhonda" (1.2) (as Pamela Shoop)
1982	Knight Rider (TV Series)	Maggie	Episode: "Knight of the Phoenix" (1.1)
1982	The Fall Guy (TV Series)	Marnie Greer	Episode: "Bail and Bond" (2.1)
1982	T. J. Hooker (TV Series)	Sheila Benson	Episode: "A Cry for Help" (2.9)
1983	Fame (TV Series)	Nancy	Episode: "Relationships" (2.13)
1983	Tales of the Gold Monkey (TV Series)	Sister Teresa / Brigid Harrington	Episode "Force of Habit" (1.16)
1983	The Rousters (TV Movie)	Trish Callahan	
1983	The Rousters (TV Series)	Trish Callahan	Episode: "The Rousters" (1.1)
1984	Masquerade (TV Series)		Episode: "Oil" (1.7) (as Pamela Shoop)
1984	Whiz Kids (TV Series)	Marcie	Episode: "The Sufi Project" (1.15)
1985	I Had Three Wives (TV Series)	Vicki	Episode: "Bedtime Stories" (1.3)
1985	Knight Rider (TV Series)	Marta Simmons	Episode: "Knight of the Juggernaut" (4.1)
1985	Scarecrow and Mrs. King	Carla Quite	Episode: "Fast Food for Thought" (3.12)
1986	Murder, She Wrote (TV Series)	Katie McCallum	Episode: "Death Stalks the Big Top: Part 1" (3.1)
1986	Murder, She Wrote (TV Series)	Katie McCallum	Episode: "Death Stalks the Big Top: Part 2" (3.2)
1987	The Law and Harry McGraw (TV Series)		Episode: "Mr. Chapman, I Presume?" (1.3)
1987	Simon & Simon (TV Series)	Jenny Burgess	Episode: "Deep Water Death" (6.13)
1988	The Highwayman (TV Series)	Dr. Chadway	Episode: "Send in the Clones" (1.5)
1988	Simon & Simon (TV Series)	Beth Eastwick	Episode: "Beauty and Deceased" (8.1)
1991	Dragnet (TV Series)	Sue Cunningham	Episode: "Armored Truck 211s" (1.20)
1992	Murder, She Wrote (TV Series)	Dorothy Porter	Episode: "Badge of Honor" (8.21)
1992	Dangerous Curves (TV Series)	Stella	Episode: "Old Acquaintance" (2.5)
1996	Kung Fu: The Legend Continues (TV Series)	Dr. Jennifer Harmon	Episode: "Dark Vision" (4.1)

== Books ==
Books
Year	Author	Book	Publisher	Notes
April 13, 1993	Pamela Susan Shoop (as Pamela Shoop Sweeney) Terrance Sweeney (as Terrance A. Sweeney)	What God Hath Joined: the Real Life Love Story that Shook the Catholic Church	Ballantine Books	Hardcover / Paperback
