= Hilda Plowright =

British actress (1890–1973)

- Plowright in The Philadelphia Story (1940)
- Born: 29 November 1890; Swaffham, Norfolk, UK
- Died: 9 October 1973 (aged 82); San Diego, California, US
- Occupation: Actress
- Years active: 1908–1965
- Known for: Character actress
- Notable work: The Philadelphia Story, Wilson

Hilda Plowright (29 November 1890 – 9 October 1973) was a British actress.

== Biography ==
Plowright was born in Swaffham, Norfolk, England. Following a career on the stage in Britain she came to the United States and obtained work and a Social Security number in New York. She died in San Diego, California following a career in film, theatre and television, primarily playing older women in assorted small roles. She had over 50 film and television appearances between 1938 and 1965. She also appeared in at least 13 theatre productions on Broadway between 1925 and 1940.

=== Theatrical work in Britain ===
Plowright had an extensive theatrical career in Britain from 1908 to 1921. The 17 August 1916 review from The Cornishman of her in the title role, Ann Annington, of Lechmere Worrall's play "Ann" (later made into the film Her Winning Way) was favourable:

In the title role of "Ann," Miss Hilda Plowright pleased the audience immensely. The eccentricity, daring, winsomeness, and vivacity of Ann's character was most skilfully evolved, and the mastery obtained over the American accent and mannerism was most noticeable.

=== Films ===
Plowright had a starring role in her first film, the 1938 Hopalong Cassidy B-movie Partners of the Plains where Gwen Gaze was the leading lady.

Plowright's role as a Quaker librarian in The Philadelphia Story has been noted as one of the first examples on film of a librarian saying "shush" to patrons, giving rise to and popularising a "new dimension to the stereotype" of stern, straightlaced librarians in film. She also was cast in Wilson as Jeannette Rankin. She auditioned for, but was not given, the role of Frau Schmidt in The Sound of Music.

Her last film was My Fair Lady in 1964 in which she had a minor role.

== Filmography ==
Plowright appeared in mostly small character roles often uncredited, in dozens of films throughout her career, including the following:

- Partners of the Plains (1938) - Aunt Martha
- Holiday (1938) - Marjorie (uncredited)
- You Can't Take It With You (1938) - Lady Melville (uncredited)
- Cafe Society (1939)- Maid (uncredited)
- The Little Princess (1939) - Nurse (uncredited)
- The Sun Never Sets (1939) - Queen Elizabeth (uncredited)
- The Women (1939) - Miss Fordyce (uncredited)
- Television Spy (1939) - Amelia Sheldon
- Raffles (1939) - Wilson
- Queen of the Mob (1940) - Mrs. Milliken (uncredited)
- Foreign Correspondent (1940) - Miss Pimm (uncredited)
- The Philadelphia Story (1940) - Librarian (uncredited)
- Kitty Foyle (1940) - Nurse (uncredited)
- Shining Victory (1941) - Nurse (uncredited)
- Suspicion (1941) - Postmistress (uncredited)
- Two-Faced Woman (1941) - Minor Role (uncredited)
- The Magnificent Ambersons (1942) - Nurse (uncredited)
- Now, Voyager (1942) - Justine (uncredited)
- Random Harvest (1942) - Paula's Nurse (uncredited)
- Mr. Lucky (1943) - Dorothy's Maid (uncredited)
- The Hour Before the Dawn (1944) - Mrs. Merritt (uncredited)
- Ministry of Fear (1944) - Maid for Mrs. Bellane #2 (uncredited)
- Wilson (1944) - Rep. Jeanette Rankin (uncredited)
- Casanova Brown (1944) - English Maid (uncredited)
- The Suspect (1944) - Mrs. Margett (uncredited)
- The Fatal Witness (1945) - Lady Mong - Dinner Guest (uncredited)
- Kitty (1945) - Mrs. Thickness (uncredited)
- Confidential Agent (1945) - Miner's Wife (uncredited)
- Devotion (1946) - Elderly Woman (uncredited)
- Sister Kenny (1946) - Saleslady (uncredited)
- The Imperfect Lady (1947) - Customer (uncredited)
- Cass Timberlane (1947)- Maid (uncredited)
- The Woman in White (1948) - Woman Attendant (uncredited)
- A Life of Her Own (1950) - Hotel Desk Clerk (uncredited)
- The Company She Keeps (1951) - Victim (uncredited)
- Thunder on the Hill (1951) - Villager (uncredited)
- Rhubarb (1951) - Katie (uncredited)
- Thunder in the East (1953) - Mrs. Morrisey (uncredited)
- Abbott and Costello Meet Dr. Jekyll and Mr. Hyde (1953) - Nursemaid (uncredited)
- A Star is Born (1954) - Shrine Auditorium Photographer (uncredited)
- Battle Cry (1955) - Mrs. Rogers (uncredited)
- Moonfleet (1955)- Granny Tucker (uncredited)
- Until They Sail (1957) - Woman (uncredited)
- Darby's Rangers (1958)
- Separate Tables (1958) - Mabel (uncredited)
- Lover Come Back (1961) - Cleaning Woman (uncredited)
- Summer Magic (1963) - Mary
- My Fair Lady (1964) - Bystander (uncredited)
- 36 Hours (1964) - German Agent

== Television ==
Plowright's television credits included two appearances in Alfred Hitchcock Presents in 1957 and 1959. Other television credits included NBC Matinee Theater (1956) and roles on The Gale Storm Show (1956), The Joseph Cotten Show (1956), and Schlitz Playhouse (1951).>

- Alfred Hitchcock Presents (1957) (Season 2 Episode 32: "The Hands of Mr. Ottermole") as Mrs. Whybrow
- Alfred Hitchcock Presents (1959) (Season 4 Episode 29: "Banquo's Chair") as Mae Thorpe

== Broadway Theatre credits ==
Broadway productions where Plowright appeared were:

- A Tale of the Wolf (1925)
- Saturday Night (1926)
- Twelfth Night (1926)
- When Crummles Played (1928)
- Michael and Mary (1929)
- Heat Wave (1931)
- The Lady with a Lamp (1931)
- The Good Fairy (1932)
- The Party's Over (1933)
- The Distaff Side (1934)
- For Valor (1935)
- And Now Good-bye (1937)
- Leave Her to Heaven (1940)
