= Empire of the Ants (film) =

1977 science fiction horror film

- Theatrical release poster by Drew Struzan
- Directed by: Bert I. Gordon
- Written by: Bert I. Gordon; Jack Turley
- Produced by: Bert I. Gordon
- Starring: Joan Collins; Robert Lansing; John Carson; Robert Pine; Albert Salmi; Jacqueline Scott; Pamela Shoop
- Narrated by: Marvin Miller
- Cinematography: Reginald H. Morris
- Edited by: Michael Luciano
- Music by: Dana Kaproff
- Production company: Cinema 77
- Distributed by: American International Pictures
- Release date: July 29, 1977
- Running time: 89 minutes
- Country: United States
- Language: English
- Box office: $2.5 million

Empire of the Ants is a 1977 science fiction horror film co-written and directed by Bert I. Gordon. Based very loosely on the 1905 short story "Empire of the Ants" by H. G. Wells, the film involves a group of prospective land buyers led by a land developer, pitted against large mutated ants.

It is the third and last film released in A.I.P.'s H.G. Wells film cycle, which include The Food of the Gods (1976) and The Island of Dr. Moreau (1977).

== Plot ==
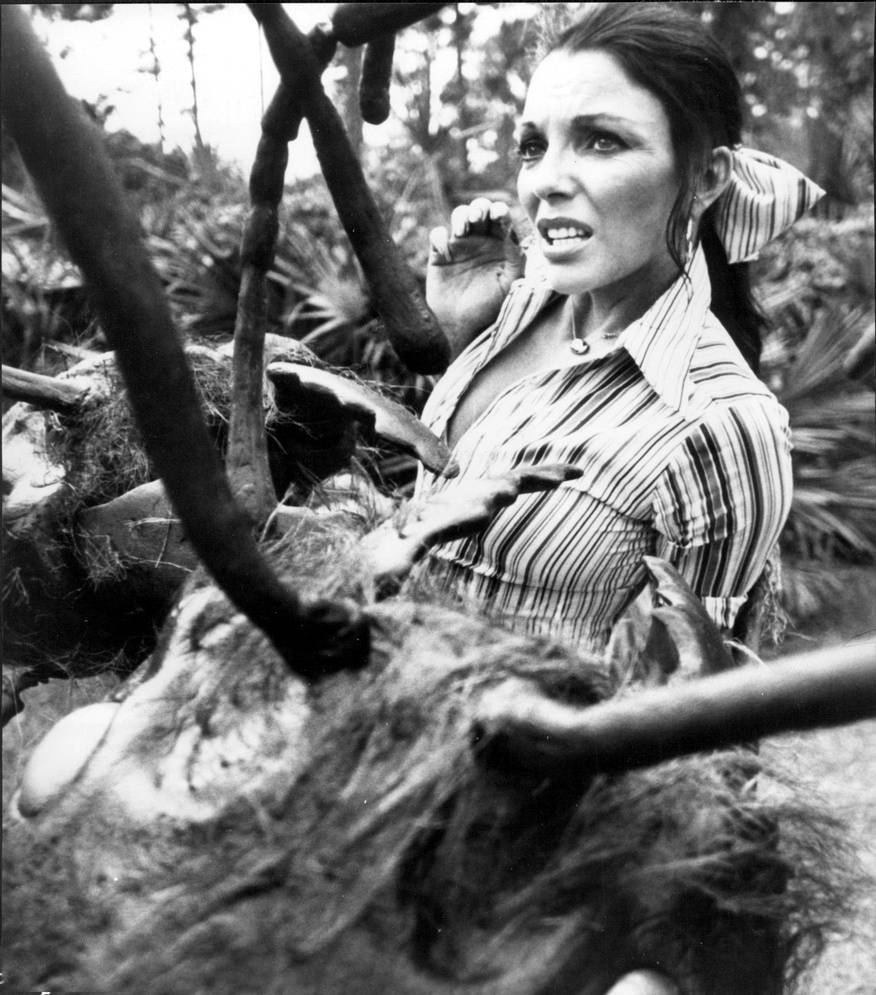
Joan Collins in the movie.

The opening narration notes how ants use pheromones to communicate and how this causes an obligatory response. As the opening credits roll, barrels sporting radioactive waste decals are dumped off a boat into the ocean. One of the barrels washes onto a beach and leaks a silvery goo onto the sand.

Meanwhile, shady land developer Marilyn Fryser takes prospective clients on a boat trip to view a beachfront land development in the area of the waste dump. Unbeknownst to the visitors, ants are writhing in the radioactive goo from the leaky barrel. The visitors question the value of the land, but the trip is cut short when some of them are attacked by giant mutated ants. The ants destroy their boat and chase the group through woods. After losing some of their party along the way, the survivors discover a town and gain a promise of help from the local sheriff. Their sense of safety is short-lived as they discover that the queen ant, using pheromones, has put the townsfolk under her control and is making them provide her colony with sugar from the local sugar plant. Joe Morrison, one of the prospective land buyers, kills the queen ant in an explosion, enabling the remaining survivors to escape the area in a speedboat.

== Cast ==
- Joan Collins as Marilyn Fryser
- Robert Lansing as Dan Stokely
- John David Carson as Joe Morrison
- Albert Salmi as Sheriff Art Kincade
- Jacqueline Scott as Margaret Ellis
- Pamela Susan Shoop as Coreen Bradford
- Robert Pine as Larry Graham
- Edward Power as Charlie Pearson
- Brooke Palance as Christine Graham
- Ilse Earl as Mary Lawson
- Tom Fadden as Sam Russell
- Harry Holcombe as Harry Thompson
- Irene Tedrow as Velma Thompson
- Marvin Miller as the Narrator

== Production ==
=== Special effects ===
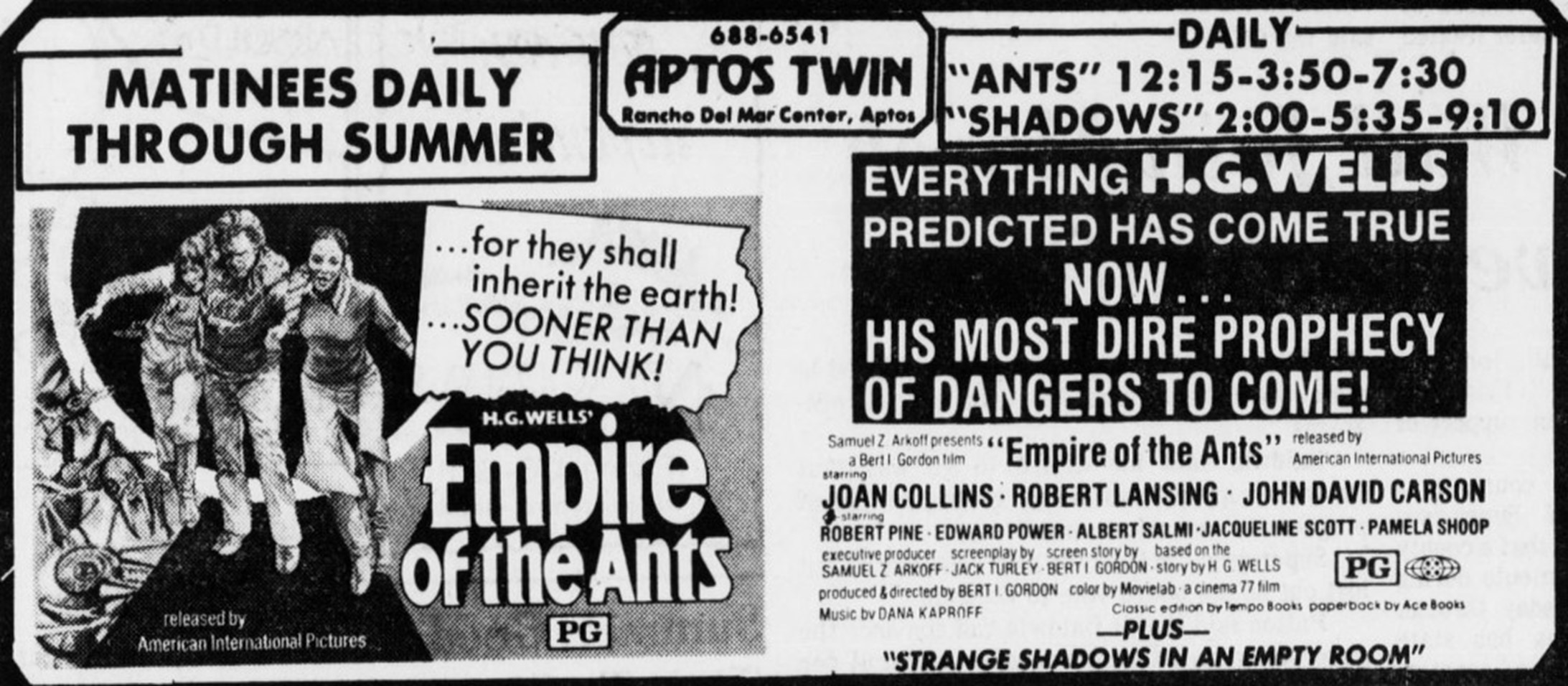
Advertisement from 1977

As with most Bert I. Gordon films, the director himself oversaw most of the special effects. To create the effect of large ants, the director often used the technique of process shots, where close-up images of live ants were combined with images of the actors on set, reacting to the menacing insects. Another more crude effect used by Gordon was one he borrowed from his previous films King Dinosaur and Beginning of the End, where he would place live insects in a miniature set lined with still photographs of the location and let them crawl around. The shortcomings of this technique were highlighted in a scene where the ants are climbing the outside of a sugar refinery, and some of them appear to suddenly crawl off the building and walk vertically into the sky. When the film called for actors to be attacked by the ants, large rubber mock-ups were used, which were animated by crew members who wiggled the gigantic props in front of the camera. Joan Collins later said she did not like working with the ant props, as they bumped and scratched the actors, including herself.

=== Filming ===
Principal photography took place on location in the Florida Everglades and St. Lucie and Martin Counties in Florida during the fall of 1976. Filming in a remote swampland sometimes proved to be problematic, and was particularly taxing for the women because their restrooms were approximately a half-hour away by speedboat. Actress Pamela Susan Shoop recalls that "because it was a half-hour each way, when we went to the bathroom, they had to wait an hour. It was a mess, but the shoot was fun". Another problem with the location was dealing with the unpredictable wildlife. According to actor Robert Pine, there was one scene where the actors had to fall out of a rowboat and into the river, where there were apparently live alligators. Gordon had previously promised that a cage would be installed to protect the actors, but for some unknown reason the cage never arrived. Also, even though they were filming in Florida, the autumn weather ended up sending temperatures to freezing levels. At one point, the cold weather was so bad that it caused Shoop's jaw to dislocate during one of her screaming scenes and she had to be sent to the hospital to be treated.

== Reception ==
On Rotten Tomatoes, the film holds an approval rating of 10% based on 20 reviews, with a weighted average rating of 3/10. Metacritic, which uses a weighted average, assigned the film a score of 26 out of 100, based on 6 critics, indicating "generally unfavorable" reviews.

Joan Collins received a nomination for the Saturn Award for Best Actress for her lead role in this film at the 5th annual 5th Saturn Awards.
