= Maralou Gray =

American singer

- Occupations: Actress, singer, event producer
- Years active: 1939-present
- Spouses: James De Nicholas (1954-1967); Lance Petri (1969-1985)
- Children: 2

Maralou Gray is an American film, television, and theater actress, and an operatic lyric coloratura soprano singer, active from the late 1930s through the 1960s.

== Early life ==
Gray began singing as a young girl, and her family noticed her vocal ability and musicality. She started taking voice and piano lessons, and at the age of 8, she auditioned for The Morris B. Sachs Amateur Hour, where she was accepted as a contestant. Over the next two years, she appeared on various radio programs and performed at live events, including church concerts and community gatherings.

In two years, she logged over 80 personal appearances, including The Organ Pavilion in Balboa Park with over 1,400 attendees.

== Career ==
In the summer of 1948, Gray and family moved to Beverly Hills, after purchasing the historic Johnny "Tarzan" Weissmuller/Lupe Velez estate, "Villa Fontanas", on the corner of Rodeo Drive and Lomitas. Surrounded by the homes of major stars- Gene Kelly, the Iturbis, George Murphy, Rosalind Russell, Jackie Cooper, etc., the home soon became a hangout for many of the "up and coming" (now well known), young actors for home-baked desserts, swimming, games, and volleyball. She entered MGM Studio, studied voice with the esteemed "Vocal Coach to the Stars", Arthur "Rosie" Rosenblum, followed by obtaining the official sponsorship of hit song composer, Jimmy McHugh, which resulted in many notable musical appearances.

Gray worked on live television, appearing on Armchair Detective, The Betty White Show and many others. At 17, her blonde good looks and magnetic chartreuse eyes brought a group of modeling and beauty titles-"Miss Buick" - she became the national "face" for the ad campaign for Buick for 2 years, with the bonus of a new eye-catching car to drive around town. This was followed by "La Sirena Del Puerto De Los Angeles," (The Mermaid of Los Angeles Harbor), in celebration of the new massive L.A. Port, handling the intros for future Chief Justice Earl Warren (Then – Governor of California), ceremonies, speeches to welcome the first large liners to dock, plus many pictures for the press. Dubbed "Miss Hollywood Star" Gray became the unofficial "Mascot" of the "Hollywood Stars" Baseball Team. During the only year that the New York Yankees trained near Los Angeles, she was tagged to escort team members Rizzuto, DiMaggio, Yogi Berra, etc., for sightseeing around town and relaxation at her home.

In 1950, the casting director at Hal Roach Studios called Gray for a possible role in one of the first filmed television series, The Stu Erwin Show - Trouble With Father. More filmed television roles followed. With sponsorship by Rod Serling and Gene Barry, she became a long-time member of the Academy of Television Arts and Sciences, serving as a Blue Ribbon Emmy Panel Judge over the years.

Gray was involved in live theater plays such as Goldmarie and Pitchmarie at the Coronet, and was signed by Maurice Schwartz (Yiddish Art Theater of New York) for a season at the Civic Playhouse Theater in Hollywood. She was hired as leading lady for "God, Man and Satan" (Faust), along with young actor, Leonard Nimoy.

In the interim, her MCA music agents kept her busy performing at local supper clubs and hotels in Oregon and Washington, where she accompanied herself on the piano for a song or two as part of the show. Gray was then booked into the world-famous "Cocoanut Grove" - the Ambassador Hotel as multi-language "Chanteuse", backed by the renowned "Miguelito Valdes Orchestra." While there, Gray was approached by the symphonic violinist brother of the V.P. of Mexico., suggesting that the hotels and clubs in Mexico City would appreciate her talent, and that bookings could be contracted. In 1951, with her mother as chaperone, the tour was arranged. She appeared at The Astoria Hotel with "Los Churumbeles", The Beachcombers with the great composer/performing artist, Agustin Lara, and a few supper clubs, then to Acapulco at the Casablanca Hotel.

As a result of actor Errol Flynn's interest in hiring Gray for one of his projects, The White Witch of Rose Hall, he became instrumental in arranging a small role for her in his Technicolor film, Against All Flags (1952). More work in the theater followed, as she appeared in "The Barker", and "Fifth Season" Actor's Inc., then chosen by the author, Pierre La Mure, as the lead in the world premiere of his play, Moulin Rouge at the Circle Theater with Gene Reynolds as "Toulouse Lautrec", and Gray as the prostitute, "Marie Charlet" (the artist's real-life nemesis). Attendance and favorable reviews led some motion picture casting directors to promise to look for strong characters in scripts that might suit her talents. Following through on their words, she was cast in Columbia's swashbuckling color film, Pirates of Tripoli (1954), as the tempestuous pirate girlfriend of leading man Paul Henreid, then enacted Jessie Babcock's courageous life in Death Valley Days - Rough and Ready (1957), was the brash dance hall hostess in Seven Ways to Sundown (1960) with Audie Murphy, and the female "crusader" lead in cult favorite Secret File Hollywood (1962). In 1964, legendary drama coach Stella Adler invited Gray to join her exclusive professional workshop for a season, sparking renewed enthusiasm. She continued on with two episodes of The Greatest Show on Earth (1963-1964) and Day of the Nightmare (1965). With the development of new interests, her desire for work in the entertainment field waned.

== Personal life ==
Gray married James De Nicholas, mortgage banker and vice president of Stalford Mortgage Company of New York/Beverly Hills, on August 29, 1954. "Villa Fontanas", her Rodeo Drive home was maintained as their residence. They had two daughters. During this period, Gray had decided to devote herself mostly to her family, appearing only in a few motion picture/television films. The "creative juices" were still flowing, however, and she became interested in interior design while refurbishing her home. This was later to become a 17-year serious business venture. Only one block from the Beverly Hills Hotel, her estate became a prime location for elegant international entertaining. Gray devoted time to many charitable groups, organizing and producing events for them over the years.

While working on the initial episode of The Greatest Show on Earth |date=Desilu's new TV series, Gray officially met actor Jack Palance. His lengthy legal marital separation was in force and he had been living in Europe while working in many films there. Having been a nearby Beverly Hills neighbor, and with many mutual good friends in common, Gray and Palance both knew of each other but had never met before. An "on again, off again" love affair ensued, lasting four years .

== Later life ==
Pursuing her interest in residential/commercial interior design, Gray founded Magnetic Interiors, Inc. in 1970. Photographs of several of her projects were displayed in various publications. After extensive exams of her projects by the Board, she was inducted into The American Society of Interior Designers (ASID), as a full professional member.

In the meantime, requests for special social functions at the Rodeo Drive home were becoming more frequent. Gray hosted a star-studded UNICEF benefit; celebrities such as Quincy Jones piloted their events, along with other major music, movie, and sports stars. Chris Evert Lloyd was honored there at the inaugural televised "Woman of the Year Hall of Fame" by Peggy Fleming and Dorothy Hamill.

Maralou then set up "National Special Event Locations, INC." (NSEL), an innovative entity that handled large privately owned estate locations around the country, and also could produce the entire event. As the original business of its kind in the U.S., the number of calls for work from around the country soon proved overwhelming. She decided to phase out the design work and go forward with NSEL. After a short time, a separate division was added, "National Film Locations" (NFL), a photo library service for film location scouts and managers, featuring the exclusive estates & other properties represented by NSEL.

Over the course of her career, Gray's clients included individuals and organizations from the United States, international business communities, and the film industry. She has continued her creative work through selected event projects and the design of one-of-a-kind gemstone necklaces.

== Filmography ==
=== Television ===
Year	Show	Role	Notes
1950	The Stu Erwin Show	Gertie Mullins	Episode: "The Ugly Duckling"
1951	The Stu Erwin Show	Gertrude Mullins	Episode: "Cafe Society"
1951	Front Page Detective	Miss Kastor	Episode: "The Lonely One"
1954	Adventures of The Falcon	Marie	Episode: "Double Indemnity"
1957	Official Detective	Beverly	Episode: "The Night It Rained Bullets"
1957	Death Valley Days	Jessie Babcock	Episode: "Rough And Ready"
1963	The Greatest Show on Earth	Chimp Handler	Episode: "Lion On Fire"
1964	The Greatest Show on Earth	Show Performer	Episode: "The Glorious Days Of Used To Be"

=== Film ===
Year	Show	Role
1952	Against All Flags	Reena
1955	Pirates of Tripoli	Rhea
1960	Seven Ways From Sundown	Dance Hall Girl
1962	Secret File Hollywood	Gay Shelton
1965	Day of the Nightmare	Alice

== Organizations/Clubs ==
- Hollywood Presbyterian Church – Member 60+ Years
- American Academy Of Television Arts and Sciences – (ATAS)
- American Society of Interior Designers – (ASID)
- Screen Actors Guild – (SAG)
- American Guild of Variety Artists – (AGVA)
- Actors Equity Guild – (AEG)
- American Federation of Musicians, Local 47 – (AFM)
- Founder Patron of the Greek Theater Association – (Huntington Hartford Theater)
- National Charity League
- The Assistance League – "Artisans"
- World Adoption International Fund (WAIF)
- Fashionettes – (Hollywood Presbyterian Hospital Cancer Equipment)
- The Beverly Hills Club (Chairman Women's Executive Committee)
- The Balboa Bay Club
