= The Silver Lining (1932 film) =

1932 film

- Directed by: Alan Crosland
- Screenplay by: Claire Corvalho; Gertrude Orr
- Story by: Hal Conklin
- Produced by: Emil C. Jensen
- Starring: Maureen O'Sullivan; Betty Compson; John Warburton; Montagu Love
- Cinematography: Robert H. Planck
- Edited by: Doris Drought
- Music by: Lee Zahler
- Production company: Alan Crosland Productions
- Distributed by: United Artists
- Release date: April 16, 1932
- Running time: 59 minutes
- Country: United States
- Language: English

The Silver Lining is a 1932 American pre-Code comedy film directed by Alan Crosland and written by Claire Corvalho and Gertrude Orr. Starring Maureen O'Sullivan, Betty Compson, John Warburton, and Montagu Love. it was released on April 16, 1932, by United Artists.

== Cast ==
- Maureen O'Sullivan as Joyce Moore
- Betty Compson as Kate Flynn
- John Warburton as Larry Clark
- Montagu Love as Michael Moore
- Mary Doran as Doris Lee
- Cornelius Keefe as Jerry
- Martha Mattox as Matron
- Wally Albright as Bobby O'Brien
- Grace Valentine as Mrs. O'Brien
- J. Frank Glendon as Judge
- Jane Kerr as Matron
- Mildred Golden as Ella Preston
- Marion Stokes as Edna Joyce
- Helen Gibson as Dorothy Dent
