= Headline Hunters (1955 film) =

1955 film by William Witney

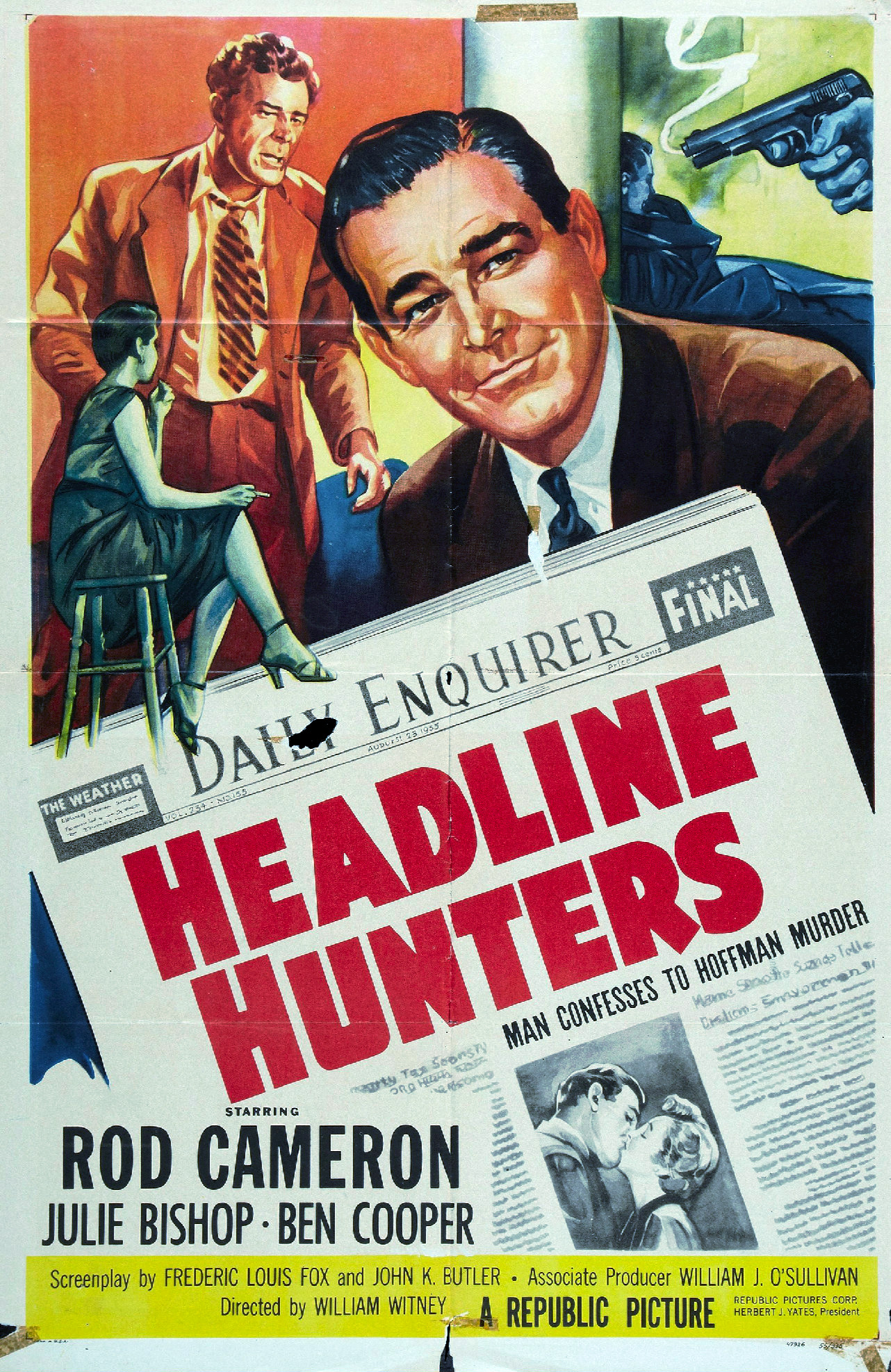
- Theatrical release poster
- Directed by: William Witney
- Screenplay by: Frederick Louis Fox; John K. Butler
- Produced by: William J. O'Sullivan
- Starring: Rod Cameron; Julie Bishop; Ben Cooper; Raymond Greenleaf; Chubby Johnson; John Warburton
- Cinematography: John L. Russell
- Edited by: Arthur Roberts
- Music by: R. Dale Butts
- Production company: Republic Pictures
- Distributed by: Republic Pictures
- Release date: September 15, 1955
- Running time: 70 minutes
- Country: United States
- Language: English

Headline Hunters is a 1955 American crime film directed by William Witney and written by Frederick Louis Fox and John K. Butler. The film stars Rod Cameron, Julie Bishop, Ben Cooper, Raymond Greenleaf, Chubby Johnson and John Warburton. The film was released on September 15, 1955 by Republic Pictures.

== Cast ==
- Rod Cameron as Hugh 'Woody' Woodruff
- Julie Bishop as Laura Stewart
- Ben Cooper as David Flynn
- Raymond Greenleaf as Paul Strout
- Chubby Johnson as Ned Powers
- John Warburton as Harvey S. Kevin
- Nacho Galindo as Ramon
- Virginia Carroll as Elsie Hoffman
- Howard Wright as Harry Bradley
- Stuart Randall as Frank Hoffman
- Edward Colmans as Rafael Garcia
- Joe Besser as Coroner
