= Partners of the Plains =

1938 film by Lesley Selander

- Directed by: Lesley Selander
- Screenplay by: Harrison Jacobs
- Based on: The Man from Bar-20: A Story of the Cow-Country; 1918 novel by Clarence E. Mulford
- Produced by: Harry Sherman
- Starring: William Boyd; Russell Hayden; Harvey Clark; Gwen Gaze; Hilda Plowright; John Warburton
- Cinematography: Russell Harlan
- Edited by: Robert B. Warwick Jr.
- Music by: Score: Gerard Carbonara; Hugo Friedhofer; John Leipold; Heinz Roemheld; Victor Young; Songs: Burton Lane (music); Ralph Freed (lyrics)
- Production company: Paramount Pictures
- Distributed by: Paramount Pictures
- Release date: January 28, 1938
- Running time: 70 minutes
- Country: United States
- Language: English

Partners of the Plains is a 1938 American Western film directed by Lesley Selander and written by Harrison Jacobs. The film stars William Boyd, Russell Hayden, Harvey Clark, Gwen Gaze, Hilda Plowright and John Warburton. The film was released on January 28, 1938, by Paramount Pictures.

== Plot ==
Lorna Drake, is an aristocratic British girl and Hoppy's new employer. When Cassidy refuses to be ordered, Lorna has him arrested for horse stealing. The dumbfounded sheriff is even more puzzled when Miss Drake turns right around and demands that Hoppy be released into her custody.

== Cast ==
- William Boyd as Hopalong Cassidy
- Russell Hayden as Lucky Jenkins
- Harvey Clark as Baldy Morton
- Gwen Gaze as Lorna Drake
- Hilda Plowright as Aunt Martha
- John Warburton as Ronald Harwood
- Al Bridge as Scar Lewis
- Al Hill as Doc Galer
- Earle Hodgins as Sheriff
- John Beach as Mr. Benson
