= Day of the Nightmare =

- DVD cover
- Directed by: John A. Bushelman
- Produced by: Leonard Goldstein
- Starring: John Ireland, John Hart, Elena Verdugo
- Cinematography: Ted V. Mikels
- Music by: André Brummer
- Production company: Screen Group
- Distributed by: Governor Films, Herts-Lion International Corp.
- Release date: October 1965
- Running time: 89 minutes
- Country: United States
- Language: English

Day of the Nightmare is a 1965 American horror film directed by John A. Bushelman and starring John Ireland, John Hart, and Elena Verdugo. The film is also known as Don't Scream, Doris Mays! The film was re-released in 1969, 1993 on VHS, and 2003 on DVD. The film tagline is "The Horror of Half Man, Half Woman, ALL KILLER!".

== Plot ==
A man with a multiple personality disorder is accused of murdering a woman. His wife risks her life trying to find out the truth about her husband's role. She considers that he could have committed the crime but intends to prove it after the police fail to find the victim's corpse. She visits her husband's father, a psychiatrist, only to encounter there a "corpse" who is quite alive and intent on killing both. She manages to survive, but her father-in-law is not so lucky. However, before he dies, he is able to recognize the killer as somebody whom he knows very well.

== Cast ==
- John Ireland as Detective Sgt. Dave Harmon
- Beverly Bain as Barbara Crane
- Cliff Fields as Jonathan Crane
- John Hart as Dr. Philip Crane
- Elena Verdugo as Miss Devi
- Jimmy Cross as Detective Smith (as James Cross)
- Michael Kray as Lieutenant Cody
- Maralou Gray as Alice
- Bonnie Beckos as Schoolteacher
- Bette Treadville as Maid
- Liz Renay as Laura Sisterman
