= Pirates of Tripoli =

1955 film by Felix E. Feist

- Theatrical release poster
- Directed by: Felix E. Feist (as Felix Feist)
- Screenplay by: Allen March
- Story by: Allen March
- Produced by: Sam Katzman
- Starring: Paul Henreid; Patricia Medina
- Cinematography: Henry Freulich
- Edited by: Edwin H. Bryant
- Color process: Technicolor
- Production company: Sam Katzman Productions
- Distributed by: Columbia Pictures
- Release date: February 10, 1955
- Running time: 71 minutes
- Country: United States
- Language: English

Pirates of Tripoli is a 1955 American adventure film directed by Felix E. Feist and starring Paul Henreid and Patricia Medina.

== Plot ==
Princess Karjan promises pirate captain Edri-Al-Gardian a fabulous reward if he helps her regain her lost kingdom of Misurata from Malek. When the latter destroys Gardian's armada, Karjan and Gardian enter Misurata in disguise in order to get Karjan's hidden jewels to buy new ships.

== Cast ==
- Paul Henreid as Edri-Al-Gadrean
- Patricia Medina as Princess Karjan
- Paul Newlan as Hammid Khassen
- John Miljan as Malek
- Mark Hanna as Ben Ali
- Jean Del Val as Abu Tala
- Lilian Bond as Sono
- Mel Welles as Gen. Tomedi
- Louis Mercier as The Cat (as Louis G. Mercier)
- Karl Davis as Assassin
- Maralou Gray as Rhea

== Production ==
It was the second swashbuckler Henreid made for Katzman, after Last of the Buccaneers.
