= Northern Pursuit =

1943 film by Raoul Walsh

- Theatrical release poster
- Directed by: Raoul Walsh
- Written by: Leslie T. White (story); Frank Gruber; Alvah Bessie; William Faulkner (uncredited)
- Produced by: Jack Chertok
- Starring: Errol Flynn; Julie Bishop; Helmut Dantine
- Cinematography: Sid Hickox
- Edited by: Jack Killifer
- Music by: Adolph Deutsch
- Distributed by: Warner Bros. Pictures
- Release date: November 13, 1943
- Running time: 93 minutes
- Country: United States
- Languages: English; German
- Budget: $1,290,000
- Box office: $3,252,000 $1.5 million (US rentals)

Northern Pursuit is a 1943 American World War II adventure thriller romance film directed by Raoul Walsh and starring Errol Flynn as a member of the Royal Canadian Mounted Police (RCMP) who tries to uncover a Nazi plot against the Allied war effort. The film was set in Canada during the early years of the war.

Walsh called the film a "quickie". Filmink called it "one of Errol's lesser war films and was far closer to the silliness of Desperate Journey than the more serious Edge of Darkness."

== Plot ==
After a German U-boat drops off Nazi saboteurs, RCMP Corporal Wagner (Flynn) captures the leader, Colonel Hugo von Keller (Helmut Dantine), the only survivor after an avalanche wipes out the rest of the group. Wagner persuades his colleague to go to report and allow von Keller to recover. Von Keller discovers that Wagner speaks German and is of German ancestry, and probes his views on the war. Wagner appears potentially sympathetic to the German cause. However, the RCMP suspect Wagner of disloyalty and despatch a patrol to bring both men in. Wagner, seemingly under suspicion by the RCMP of being a Nazi sympathizer, asks successfully to be discharged from the force. After being sent to a prisoner of war camp, von Keller leads an escape of other German soldiers. Wagner is subsequently contacted by Ernst Willis (Gene Lockhart), an enemy agent, who hires him as a wilderness guide.

Wagner and his new confederate set out for the north by train, while a pursuing Mountie who makes contact with Wagner is killed by the agent. Wagner is taken to von Keller and convinces him that he is loyal to Germany and can guide him and his companions through the Canadian wilderness to a mysterious destination. His fiancée Laura McBain (Julie Bishop) is held as a hostage to ensure his loyalty but Wagner, acting as a double agent, manages to send a message to police headquarters to alert them of the Nazi saboteurs' plans.

Fellow Mountie Jim Austin (John Ridgely) follows their trail, but is spotted and killed, along with Willis and a native Canadian porter, before the group reaches a mine shaft where bomber components have been secreted before the war. The bomber is assembled and takes off for its mission: to bomb the main waterway between the United States and Canada to disrupt transatlantic shipping of war materials. Wagner manages to escape, climbs aboard the aircraft to shoot the crew, and parachutes to safety before the bomber crashes. After recovering from a wound he received during the skirmish on board the aircraft, he and Laura marry.

== Cast ==
- Errol Flynn as RCMP Corporal Steve Wagner
- Julie Bishop as Laura McBain
- Helmut Dantine as Colonel Hugo von Keller
- John Ridgely as Jim Austin
- Gene Lockhart as Ernst Willis
- Tom Tully as Inspector Barnett
- Bernard Nedell as Tom Dagor
- Monte Blue as Jean
- Alec Craig as Angus McBain
- Rose Higgins as Rose Dagor

== Production ==
Northern Pursuit was intended to be a propaganda film following the general storyline of other contemporary films including 49th Parallel (1942) and Flynn's earlier Desperate Journey (1942).

Northern Pursuit was originally known as To the Last Man and was based on a magazine story. A.I. Bezzerides wrote the first screenplay under the supervision of Jesse L. Lasky, with Errol Flynn always meant to star. Alexis Smith was originally named as Flynn's co-star.

Later William Faulkner and Thomas Job were reported as working on the script. Raoul Walsh was taken from the film Night Shift (replaced by Vincent Sherman) to work on the movie. Helmut Dantine was also taken off Night Shift to star in the film. Julie Bishop, who had just impressed in Action in the North Atlantic, was eventually cast in the female lead.

Eventually Jack Chertok took over producing.

Warner Bros. Pictures was aware that their star had recently been embroiled in a real-life scandal, with his acquittal in a rape trial only serving to increase the box-office "draw" of the 1943 feature. Flynn is cast as the faithful lover and invariably brought down the house in 1943, after assuring his fiancée, Laura that she's the only woman he's ever loved, he turns away and quips, "What am I saying?"

During the production of Northern Pursuit, Flynn took ill in May 1943, collapsing on the set and being hospitalized for a week. The studio released information indicating he had an "upper respiratory ailment", but he was battling tuberculosis.

The aircraft in Northern Pursuit is the ubiquitous Lockheed Hudson bomber, a type that appeared frequently in Warner Bros. films as the Lockheed Aircraft production plant was located near the studio and photography was often arranged when the bomber delivery schedule allowed. A combination of model and live-action footage was used in the aircraft sequences. Interiors and exteriors shot at the Burbank studios alternated with location shooting at Sun Valley, Idaho to replicate the Canadian north. Stock footage of Winnipeg also was used in the court martial sequence. No location photography took place in Canada.

== Reception ==
Although similar to other Flynn "swashbucklers", the public and critical reaction was mixed. Bosley Crowther of The New York Times considered it "old business" for the star, and the production "came huffing and puffing" to the Strand Theatre in New York for its premiere.

=== Box Office ===
According to the Warner Bros. ledgers, the film earned $1,938,000 domestically and $1,314,000 foreign.

In 1949 the film sold 215,345 admissions at the French box office.
