= Space Probe Taurus =

1965 film by Leonard Katzman

Space Probe-Taurus
- Directed by: Leonard Katzman
- Written by: Leonard Katzman
- Produced by: Burt Topper; Leon D. Selznick
- Starring: Francine York; James E. Brown; Baynes Barron; Russ Bender
- Cinematography: Robert Tobey
- Edited by: Robert S. Eisen; Jon Shouse
- Music by: Marlin Skyles
- Production company: American International Pictures
- Distributed by: American International Pictures
- Release date: 1965
- Running time: 81 minutes
- Country: United States
- Language: English

Space Probe Taurus (a.k.a. Space Monster) is a 1965 low budget black-and-white science fiction/action/drama film from American International Pictures, written and directed by Leonard Katzman, and starring Francine York, James E. Brown, Baynes Barrow, and Russ Bender.

== Plot ==
In the late 20th century, when crewed missions to outer space have become routine, a distress call from the spaceship Faith One requests its immediate destruction. It has been contaminated by an infectious gas, leaving all crew dead except for its commander (Bob Legionaire). The mission is aborted and the spaceship is destroyed.

By 2000, a new propulsion technology has been developed. Four astronauts aboard the spaceship Hope One set off to find new planets for colonization. Their mission takes them past a space platform circling Earth. General Mark Tillman (James Macklin) at Earth Control HQ tells a TV reporter (John Willis) that all is going according to the pre-flight plan.

The crew of gravity-controlled Hope One consists of the pilot/commanding officer, Colonel Hank Stevens (James Brown), and three scientists: Dr. John Andros (Baynes Barron), Dr. Paul Martin (Russ Bender), and Dr. Lisa Wayne (Francine York). It is quickly revealed that Stevens did not want a woman on the mission, but he is stuck with Dr. Wayne anyway.

Not long into their voyage, Hope One comes upon an unknown spacecraft. Earth Control instructs them to investigate and they encounter a grotesque alien. The alien attacks Dr. Andros, forcing Stevens to shoot and kill it. Radiation levels then rise on the alien spacecraft, so Stevens sets a bomb to blow it up.

After a fiery meteorite storm leads to an emergency landing in the ocean of an Earth-like escaped moon, Stevens takes time to apologize to Wayne for his sexist remarks, which results in a quick reconciliation and a more-than-friendly kiss. While repairs continue, giant crabs take an interest in the spaceship. The crew decides to test the atmosphere to see if it contains breathable air, which it does. Andros then volunteers to go scout the nearest land mass. A sea monster almost intercepts him, but the scientist reaches shore, while his comrades continue repairs and worry about him. Upon his return, Andros is again attacked by the sea monster and, after making it back safely to the spaceship, perishes after confirming that the planet can support human life and plants can grow. The crew confirms this to Earth, names the planet Andros One, and rockets back safely to Earth.

== Cast ==
- Francine York as Dr. Lisa Wayne
- James Brown as Col. Hank Stevens
- Baynes Barron as Dr. John Andros
- Russ Bender as Dr. Paul Martin
- John Willis as TV Reporter
- Bob Legionaire as Faith I Crewman
- James Macklin as Gen. Mark Tilman
- Phyllis Selznick as Earth Control Secretary
- John Lomma as Earth Control
