= Empire of the Ants =

1905 short story by H. G. Wells

"The Empire of the Ants"
- Short story by H. G. Wells
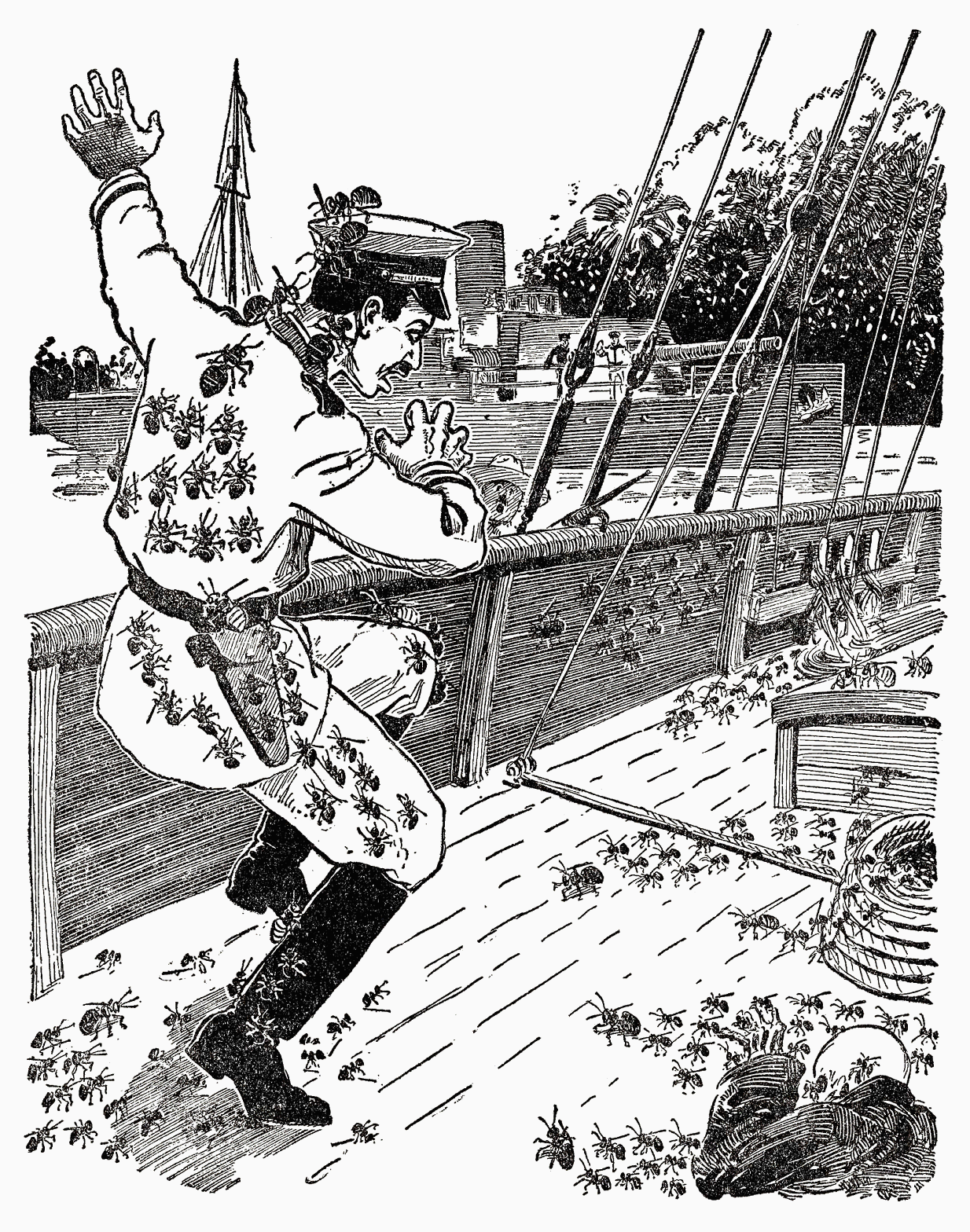
- Opening illustration for the story in Amazing Stories magazine, 1926.
- Country: United Kingdom
- Genre: Science fiction

Publication

"The Empire of the Ants" is a 1905 short story by H. G. Wells about an explorer who is dispatched to South America to investigate reports of intelligent ants destroying a colony. A 1977 film, Empire of the Ants, was loosely based on Wells' story, which also inspired the 1974 film Phase IV.

== Plot summary ==
"The Empire of the Ants" features a Brazilian captain, Gerilleau, who is ordered to take his gunboat, the Benjamin Constant, to assist the inhabitants of the town of Badama, in the "Upper Amazon", "against a plague of ants".

Accompanying him is a Lancastrian engineer named Holroyd, from whose point of view the story is (for the most part) told. They find a species of large black ant that has evolved advanced intelligence and has used it to make tools and organize aggression. Before arriving in Badama, Captain Gerilleau encounters a cuberta which has been taken over by the ants, which have killed and mutilated two sailors. After Capt. Gerilleau sends his second in command, Lieutenant da Cunha, aboard the vessel, the ants attack him and he dies painfully, apparently poisoned.

The next day, after burning the cuberta, the Benjamin Constant arrives off Badama. The town is deserted and all its inhabitants dead or dispersed. Fearing the ants and their poison, Capt. Gerilleau contents himself with firing "de big gun" at the town twice, with minimal effect. He then demands "what else was there to do?" (a phrase that is echoed when discussing the ants) and returns downstream for orders. A final section reports that Holroyd has returned to England to warn the authorities about the ants "before it is too late".

"The Empire of the Ants" was first published in 1905 in The Strand Magazine.
