= John Warburton (actor) =

British actor (1903–1981)

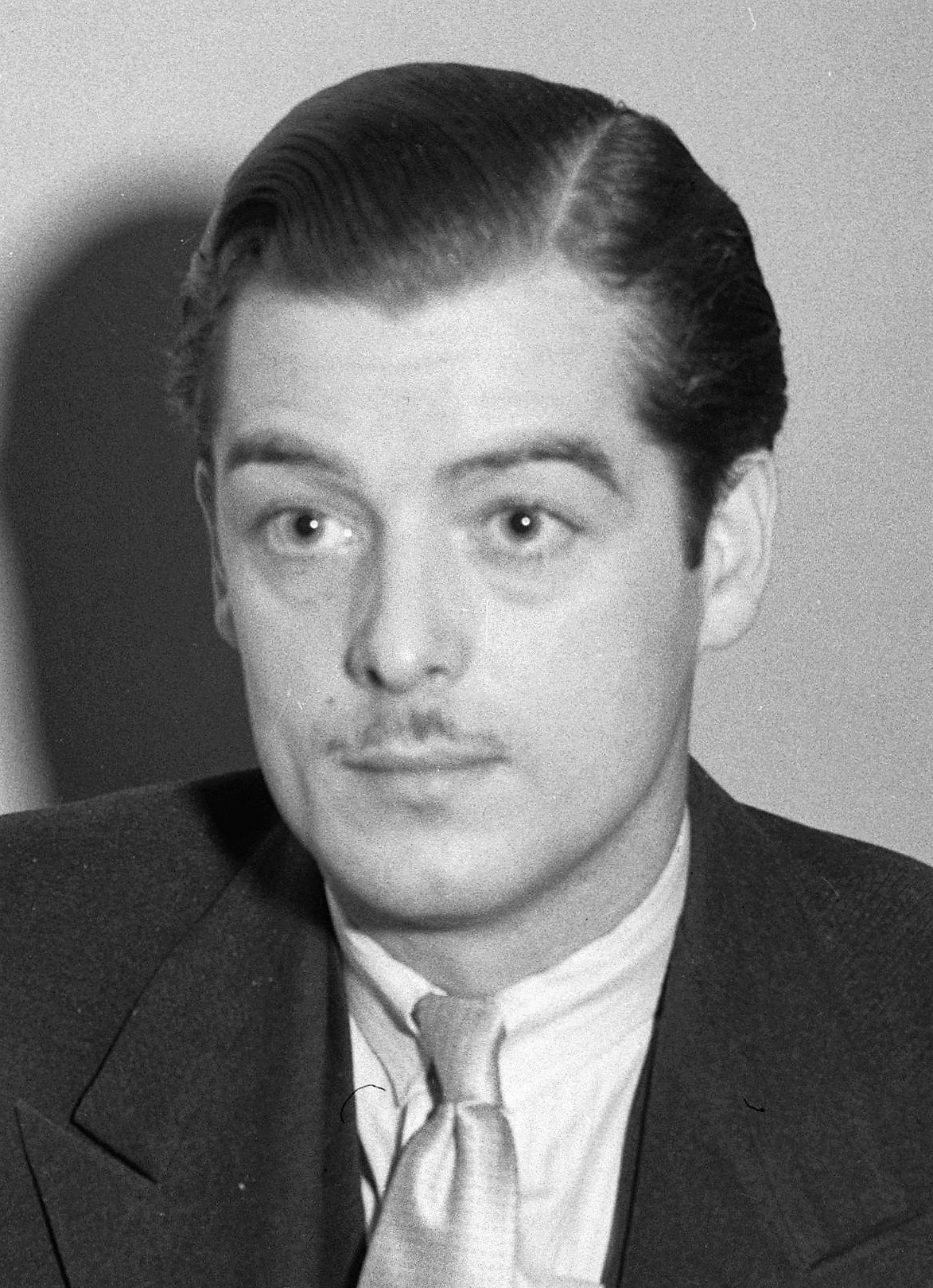
- John Warburton in 1933
- Born: 18 June 1903; Drogheda, Ireland
- Died: 27 October 1981 (aged 78); Sherman Oaks, California, US
- Education: Oxford University
- Occupation: Actor
- Years active: 1932–1978

John Warburton (June 18, 1903 – October 27, 1981) was a British actor who appeared in numerous Hollywood films in the 1930s to 1960s.

== Biography ==
Born in Drogheda, Ireland, Warburton studied for the ministry at Oxford University and served in the British military beginning in 1916. He came to the United States as a stowaway on a freighter and began acting on stage in New York.

On Broadway, Warburton portrayed Cyril Beverley in Bird in Hand (1930). His film career began with RKO's Secrets of the French Police (1932). His work on television included performing on 35 episodes of Fireside Theater. He also guest-starred in television series such as Perry Mason and the Star Trek episode "Balance of Terror".

In 1933, Warburton was in the center of legal trouble in Los Angeles. A grand jury indicted two men for beating and robbing Warburton in revenge for his alleged beating of actress Alice White. She testified that an argument at a party led to Warburton's battery, which resulted in her spending four days in bed to recover.

== Personal life ==
Among Warburton's five wives were Ruth Selwyn and Lucille Morrison.

== Death ==
He died of cancer in Sherman Oaks, California at age 78.

== Selected filmography ==
- The Silver Lining (1932) as Larry Clark
- Secrets of the French Police (1932) as Leon Renault
- Love Is Dangerous (1933) as Steve
- Cavalcade (1933) as Edward Marryot
- A Study in Scarlet (1933) as John Stanford
- Blind Adventure (1933) as Reggie
- Charlie Chan's Greatest Case (1933) as John Quincy Winterslip
- Let's Talk It Over (1934) as Alex Winters
- Dizzy Dames (1935) as Rodney Stokes
- Becky Sharp (1935) as Beau Brummel (uncredited)
- Partners of the Plains (1938) as Ronald Harwood
- The Sisters (1938) as Anthony Bittick
- Captain Fury (1939) as Bob
- The White Cliffs of Dover (1944) as Reggie Ashwood
- Marriage Is a Private Affair (1944) as Chris (uncredited)
- Nothing but Trouble (1944) as Ronetz
- The Valley of Decision (1945) as Giles
- Dangerous Partners (1945) as Clyde Ballister
- Confidential Agent (1945) as Neil Forbes
- Saratoga Trunk (1945) as Bartholomew Van Steed
- Tarzan and the Huntress (1947) as Carl Marley
- Living in a Big Way (1947) as 'Skippy' Stuart Simms
- Bronco Buster (1952) as Crawford (uncredited)
- City Beneath the Sea (1953) as Captain Clive
- East of Sumatra (1953) as Gregory Keith
- The Royal African Rifles (1953) as Col. Burke
- Headline Hunters (1955) as Harvey S. Kevin
- The Mating Game (1956) as Marshall (uncredited)
- From the Terrace (1960) as Partner (uncredited)
- Secret File: Hollywood (1962) as Jimmy Cameron
- Perry Mason (1962) as Mr. Campion
- King Rat (1965) as The Commandant
- Assault on a Queen (1966) as Bank Manager
- Funny Girl (1968) as Card Player (uncredited)
- Nighthawks (1978) (final film role)

== Television ==
| Year | Title | Role | Notes |
|---|---|---|---|
| 1966 | Star Trek: The Original Series | The Centurion | S1:E14, "Balance of Terror" |
