= Julie Bishop (actress) =

American TV and film actress (1914–2001)

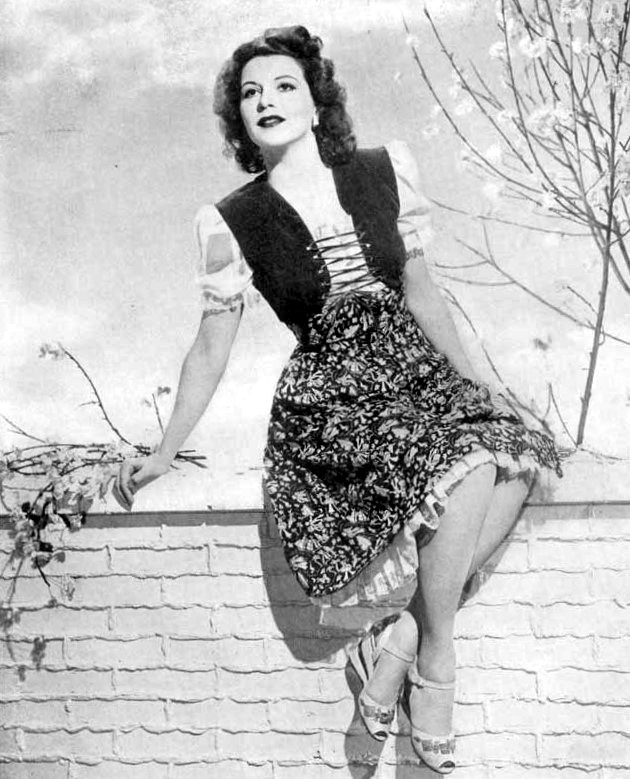
- Bishop in 1944
- Born: Jacqueline Brown; August 30, 1914; Denver, Colorado, U.S.
- Died: August 30, 2001 (aged 87); Mendocino, California, U.S.
- Resting place: Forest Lawn Memorial Park, Glendale, California
- Other names: Diane Duval, Jacqueline Wells
- Occupation: Actress
- Years active: 1923–1957
- Known for: Northern Pursuit; Action in the North Atlantic; Sands of Iwo Jima; The High and the Mighty; Rhapsody in Blue
- Spouses: Walter Booth Brooks III (m. 1936; div. 1939) Clarence A. Shoop (m. 1944; died 1968) William F. Bergin M.D. (m. 1968)
- Children: 2, including Pamela Susan Shoop

Julie Bishop (born Jacqueline Brown; August 30, 1914 – August 30, 2001), previously known as Jacqueline Wells, was an American film and television actress. She appeared in more than 80 films between 1923 and 1957.

== Early life ==
Julie Bishop was born Jacqueline Brown in Denver, Colorado on August 30, 1914. She used the family name Wells professionally through 1941, and also appeared on stage (and in one film) as Diane Duval. She was a child actress, beginning her career in 1923, in either Children of Jazz or Maytime (sources are contradictory).

== Career ==

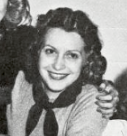
Julie Bishop also known as Jacqueline Wells in 1938 Photoplay

By 1932, she was already a veteran film actress. Her earliest talkies were with the Hal Roach studio, where she worked in short-subject comedies with Laurel and Hardy, Charley Chase, and The Boy Friends. Then she began freelancing, working in supporting roles at large studios and in leading roles at small studios. Her ingenue role in the 1936 Laurel and Hardy feature The Bohemian Girl won her a contract at Columbia Pictures, where she starred in a succession of minor features, mostly action fare. She left Columbia in 1939 and resumed her freelance career.

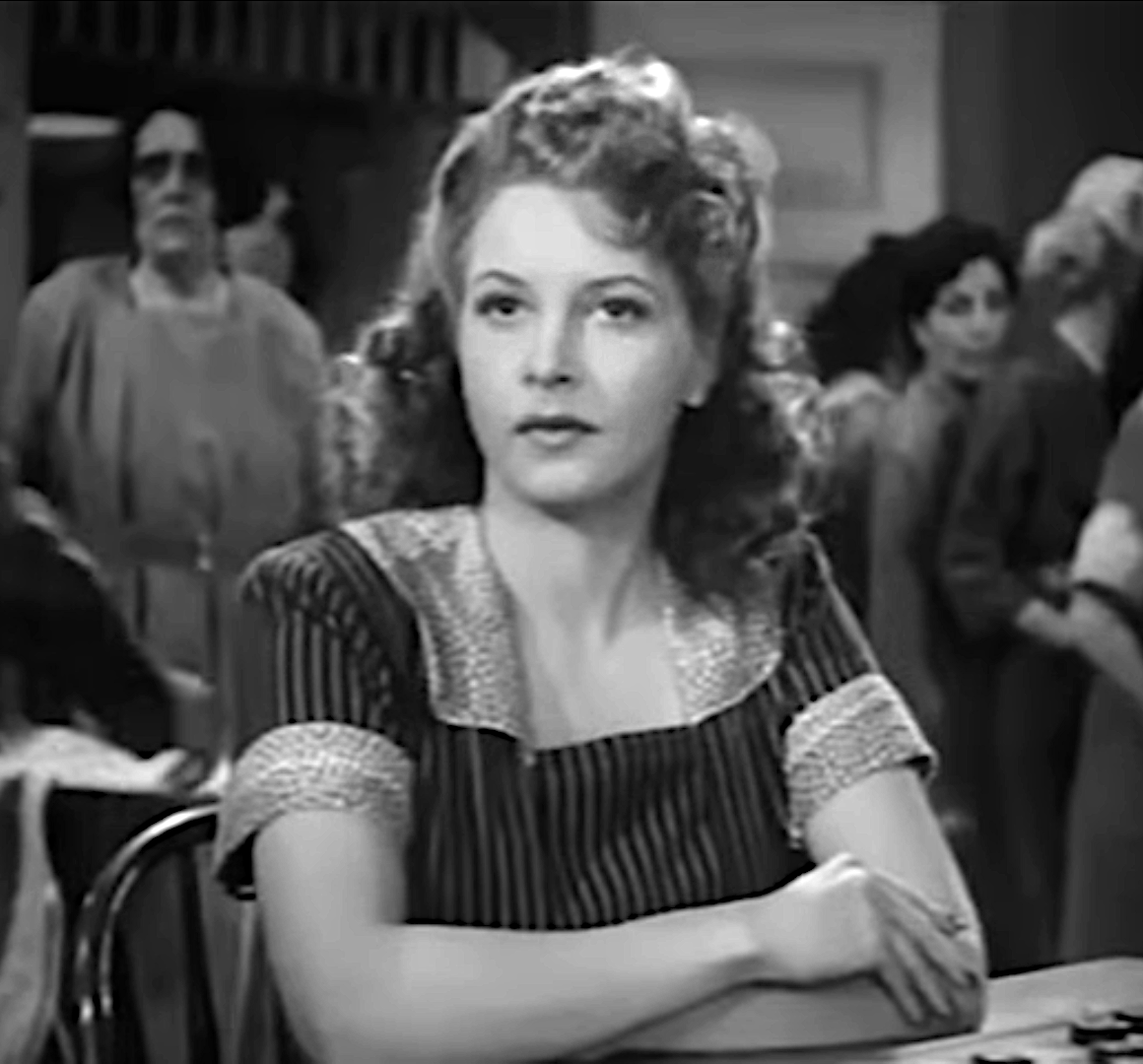
Bishop in Lady Gangster, 1942

In 1941, she was offered a contract by Warner Bros. on the condition that she change her name; "Jacqueline Wells" was considered a faded, B-picture name. She chose the name Julie Bishop because it matched the monograms on her luggage (created when her married name was Jacqueline Brooks).

She made 16 films at Warners, including supporting roles in Action in the North Atlantic (1943) with Humphrey Bogart and Princess O'Rourke (1943), starring Olivia de Havilland and Robert Cummings. While filming the latter, she met her second husband, Clarence Shoop, a pilot. She was Errol Flynn's leading lady in Northern Pursuit (1943), played Ira Gershwin's wife in the biopic Rhapsody in Blue (1945), and closed out her Warners years in 1946's Cinderella Jones.

In 1949, Bishop played a down-on-her-luck wife and mother in the Sands of Iwo Jima, opposite John Wayne. She was among several former Wayne co-stars (including Laraine Day, Ann Doran, Jan Sterling, and Claire Trevor) who joined the actor in 1954's aviation drama, The High and the Mighty.

She went on to work in television, notably opposite Bob Cummings in his situation comedies. She retired from acting in 1957.

== Death ==
Bishop died of pneumonia on her 87th birthday, August 30, 2001 in Mendocino, California. She is interred at Forest Lawn Memorial Park in Glendale, California in the same plot as her second husband, Clarence A. Shoop.

== Selected filmography ==
Year	Title	Role	Notes
1923	Children of Jazz	Child	
1923	Bluebeard's 8th Wife	Child	
1923	Maytime	Little Girl	
1924	Dorothy Vernon of Haddon Hall	Child Extra	
1924	The Good Bad Boy	Child	Uncredited
1924	Captain Blood	Little Girl	Uncredited
1925	The Golden Bed	Flora as a Child	Uncredited
1925	The Homemaker	Helen Knapp	
1925	Classified	Jeanette	
1926	The Bar-C Mystery		
1926	The Family Upstairs	Annabelle Heller	
1931	Pardon Us		
1931	Scareheads		
1932	Any Old Port!	Bride	Short film
1932	Heroes of the West	Ann Blaine	
1933	Alice in Wonderland		
1933	Clancy of the Mounted	Ann Laurie	
1933	Tarzan the Fearless	Mary Brooks	
1933	Tillie and Gus	Mary Sheridan	
1934	Happy Landing		
1934	The Black Cat	Joan Alison	
1934	The Loudspeaker	Janet Melrose	
1934	Kiss and Make-Up	Salon Client	
1934	Happy Landing	Janet Curtis	
1935	Square Shooter	Sally Wayne	
1935	Coronado	Barbara Forrest	
1936	Night Cargo	Claire Martineau	Also known as Marty
1936	The Bohemian Girl	Arline as an Adult	
1937	The Frame-Up	Betty Lindale	
1937	Girls Can Play	Ann Casey	
1937	Counsel for Crime	Ann McIntyre	
1937	She Married an Artist	Betty Dennis	
1937	Paid to Dance	Joan Bradley	
1938	Little Miss Roughneck	Mary LaRue	
1938	When G-Men Step In	Marjory Drake	
1938	Flight Into Nowhere	Joan Hammond	
1938	The Main Event	Helen Phillips	
1938	Highway Patrol	Jane Brady	
1938	Flight to Fame	Barbara Fiske	
1938	Spring Madness	Mady Platt	
1938	The Little Adventuress	Helen Gould	
1939	My Son Is a Criminal	Myrna Kingsley	
1939	Behind Prison Gates	Sheila Murray	
1939	Kansas Terrors	Maria del Montez	
1939	Torture Ship	Joan Martel	
1939	The Amazing Mr. Williams	Face of 7th Victim in Newspaper Photo	Uncredited
1939	My Son Is Guilty	Julia Allen	
1940	Girl in 313	Lorna Hobart	
1940	The Ranger and the Lady	Jane Tabor	
1940	Young Bill Hickok	Louise Mason	
1940	Her First Romance	Eileen Strong	
1941	Back in the Saddle	Taffy	
1941	The Nurse's Secret	Florence Lentz	
1941	International Squadron	Mary Wyatt	
1941	Steel Against the Sky	Myrt	
1942	Wild Bill Hickok Rides	Violet – Chorus Girl	
1942	Lady Gangster	Myrtle Reed	
1942	I Was Framed	Ruth Marshall (Scott)	
1942	Escape from Crime	Molly O'Hara	
1942	Busses Roar	Reba Richards	
1942	The Hidden Hand	Rita Channing	
1943	The Hard Way	Chorine	Uncredited
1943	Action in the North Atlantic	Pearl O'Neill	
1943	Princess O'Rourke	Stewardess	Uncredited
1943	Northern Pursuit	Laura McBain	
1944	Hollywood Canteen	Junior Hostess	Uncredited
1945	Rhapsody in Blue	Lee Gershwin	
1945	You Came Along	Mrs. Taylor	
1946	Idea Girl	Pat O'Rourke	
1946	Cinderella Jones	Camille	
1946	Murder in the Music Hall	Diane	
1946	Strange Conquest	Virginia Sommers	
1947	Last of the Redmen	Cora Munro	
1947	High Tide	Julie Vaughn	
1949	Deputy Marshall	Claire Benton	
1949	The Threat	Ann Williams	
1949	Sands of Iwo Jima	Mary	
1950	Riders of the Range		
1951	Secrets of Beauty	Ruth Waldron	
1951	Westward the Women	Laurie Smith	
1953	Sabre Jet	Mrs. Marge Hale	
1954	The High and the Mighty	Lillian Pardee	
1955	Headline Hunters	Laura Stewart	
1957	The Big Land	Kate Johnson	Final film role

== Television ==
Year	Title	Role	Notes
1952-1953	My Hero	Julie Marshall	32 episodes
1954	Fireside Theatre	Irene Adams	Episode: "Juror on Trial"
1955	TV Reader's Digest	Agnes	Episode: "A Million Dollar Story"
1956	Warner Bros. Presents		Episode: "Survival"
1956	The Bob Cummings Show	Sergeant Helen Brewster	Episode: "The Sergeant Wore Skirts"
1956	Ethel Barrymore Theatre		Episode: "The Victim"
