= It's Only Money =

1962 film by Frank Tashlin

- Directed by: Frank Tashlin
- Written by: John Fenton Murray
- Produced by: Paul Jones
- Starring: Jerry Lewis; Zachary Scott; Joan O'Brien; Mae Questel; Jesse White
- Cinematography: W. Wallace Kelley
- Edited by: Arthur P. Schmidt
- Music by: Walter Scharf
- Distributed by: Paramount Pictures
- Release date: November 21, 1962
- Running time: 84 minutes
- Language: English
- Box office: 1,073,011 admissions (France)

It's Only Money is a 1962 American comedy film directed by Frank Tashlin and starring Jerry Lewis and was released by Paramount Pictures. It was the final film of Zachary Scott.

== Plot ==
Lester March is a 25-year-old orphan who is an electronics repairman. However, his real passion is detective novels, and he dreams of becoming a detective himself someday. His best friend, Pete Flint, is a detective, and they see a television program about a wealthy single woman, Cecilia Albright, who is looking for her long-lost nephew. The mention of a $100,000 reward gains their attention.

Flint allows March to join him in sneaking into the Albright mansion in hopes of solving the mystery and collecting the reward. During their break-in, Albright's lawyer sees them and recognizes March as being the long-lost nephew, Charles Albright Jr. The lawyer was responsible for Charles Albright, Sr.'s death, and his plan is to marry Cecilia and kill her to inherit the entire fortune. With the help of the butler, they plan to kill March so he does not interfere with that plan.

The family nurse, Wanda Paxton discovers March's identity and falls in love with him. The lawyer's plans are foiled, March's identity is revealed, and Paxton and March are married.

== Cast ==
- Jerry Lewis as Lester
- Joan O'Brien as Wanda
- Zachary Scott as Gregory DeWitt
- Jack Weston as Leopold
- Mae Questel as Cecilia
- Jesse White as Pete Flint
- Francine York as Sexy Girl
- Barbara Pepper as the Fisherwoman

== Production ==
Filming was from October 9 to December 17, 1961.

== Home media ==
The film was released on DVD and Blu-ray on March 27, 2012.
