= Happy Landing (1934 film) =

1934 film directed by Robert N. Bradbury

- Directed by: Robert N. Bradbury
- Written by: Stuart Anthony; Frances Hyland; Gordon Rigby
- Produced by: Paul Malvern; Trem Carr
- Starring: Ray Walker; Julie Bishop; William Farnum
- Cinematography: Archie Stout
- Edited by: Carl Pierson
- Production company: Paul Malvern Productions
- Distributed by: Monogram Pictures
- Release date: September 1, 1934
- Running time: 63 minutes
- Country: United States
- Language: English

Happy Landing is a 1934 American action film directed by Robert N. Bradbury and starring Ray Walker, Julie Bishop and William Farnum.

== Plot ==
Lt. Nick Terris (Ray Walker), a skilled and spirited young pilot in the U.S. Flying Service), enjoys carefree aerial stunts and camaraderie with fellow flyers. He is also romantically involved with Janet Curtis (Julie Bishop, credited as Jacqueline Wells), the daughter of his superior, Colonel Curtis (William Farnum).

When a gang of bank robbers hijacks Nick's patrol plane at gunpoint, they force him to fly them across the border (likely into Mexico), knock him unconscious, and escape with their loot. Nick awakens with no memory of the forced flight or the criminals' actions, leaving him unable to explain the unauthorized border crossing or the suspicious circumstances. Branded with suspicion and dishonor by his superiors for the apparent breach of duty, Nick resigns from the service in disgrace, his reputation unfairly tarnished. Determined to clear his name and expose the truth, he launches a personal investigation to track down the dangerous gang of /outlaws—who operate as "outlaws-of-the-clouds" running illicit operations.

With help from loyal allies, Nick infiltrates their network and a high-stakes showdown between the airborne criminals and the forces of the U.S. Flying Service. Nick ultimately unmasks the smugglers, restores his good name, and vindicates justice in the skies.

== Cast ==
- Ray Walker as Lt. Nick Terris
- Julie Bishop as Janet Curtis
- William Farnum as Col. Curtis
- Noah Beery as Capt. Terris
- Hyram A. Hoover as Lt. Peter Taylor
- Morgan Conway as Frank Harland
- Warner Richmond as Powell
- Donald Reed as Paul
- Billy Erwin as Horace
- Ruth Romaine as Stella
- Eddie Fetherston as Wireless Operator
- Gertrude Simpson as Wife

== Bibliography ==
- Stephen Pendo. Aviation in the Cinema. Scarecrow Press, 1985.
