= Francine York =

American actress (1936–2017)

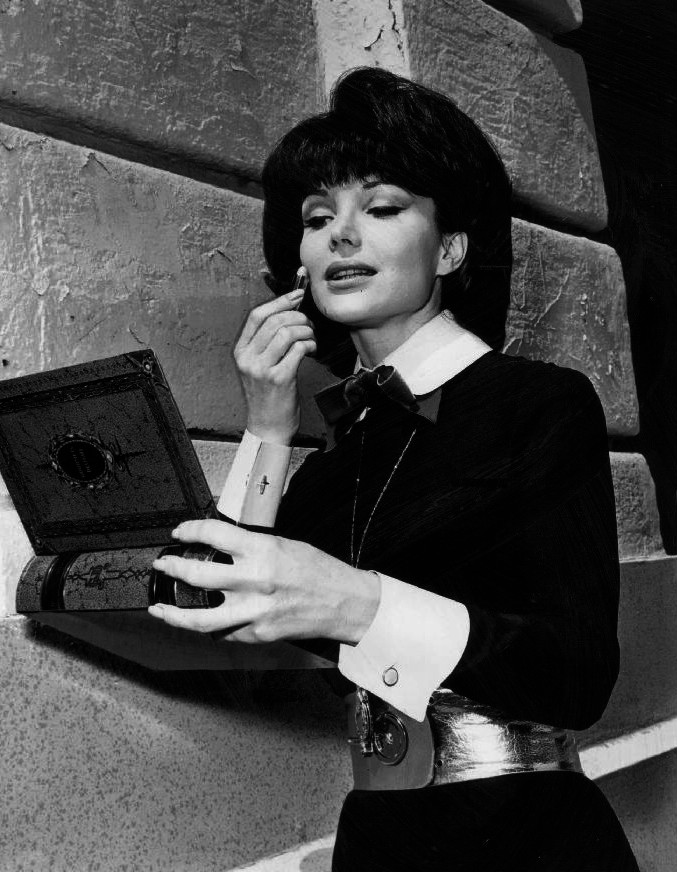
- York in 1966
- Born: Francine Yerich; August 26, 1936; Aurora, Minnesota, U.S.
- Died: January 6, 2017 (aged 80); Van Nuys, California, U.S.
- Occupation: Actress
- Years active: 1960–2017
- Known for: It's Only Money; Batman

Francine York (born Francine Yerich; August 26, 1936 – January 6, 2017) was an American actress and model. She also used her birth name Francine Yerich in her occupation.

== Early life ==
Francine Yerich was born to Frank and Sophie Yerich in the small mining town of Aurora, Minnesota. She attended Hamline University for a few terms on a drama scholarship.

== Career ==
=== Model ===
At age 17, she was runner-up in the Miss Minnesota contest.

=== Nightclub performer ===
York soon got a job as a showgirl at Bimbo's nightclub in San Francisco. Bimbo's headliner, Mary Meade French, brought her to Hollywood and helped get her signed with an agent. York worked at Frank Sennes' Moulin Rouge, a popular Hollywood nightclub on Sunset Blvd., where she performed in three shows a night, seven nights a week, for six months. Tired of sharing a stage with elephants, pigeons, and horses, she began taking acting classes with actor/teacher Jeff Corey. A theatrical producer cast her in a play called Whisper in God's Ear at the Circle Theatre, and she was also cast in her first movie, Secret File: Hollywood, a film about the day-to-day operations of a sleazy Hollywood tabloid.

=== Actress ===
==== Film ====
York's first screen role was in Robert Clarke's Hollywood exploitation film Secret File Hollywood shot in 1960 but not distributed until 1962. Her big break came when Jerry Lewis cast her in It's Only Money, in which she played a tantalizing sexpot, a role which brought her much publicity. This led to Lewis hiring her for five more of his films, including The Nutty Professor, The Patsy, The Disorderly Orderly, The Family Jewels, and Cracking Up, in which she portrayed a 15th-century marquise. Other film appearances include Bedtime Story, Tickle Me, Cannon for Cordoba, and science fiction cult films such as Curse of the Swamp Creature, Mutiny in Outer Space, and Space Probe Taurus. In The Doll Squad (1973), she played CIA agent Sabrina Kincaid. She portrayed Marilyn Monroe in Marilyn: Alive and Behind Bars, and in 2000, she played Nicolas Cage's mother-in-law in The Family Man.

==== Television ====
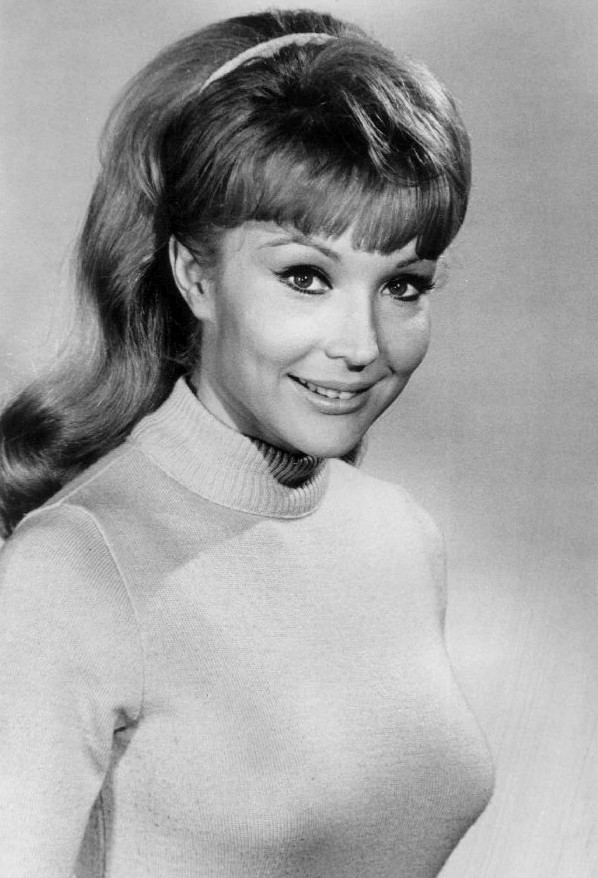
Francine York from a guest appearance on It Takes a Thief.

York portrayed Amanda Agnew on It Takes a Thief, Wendy Wendkoski on Slattery's People, and Kate Landis on The Courtship of Eddie's Father. In 1964, she appeared as Nurse Norma in My Favorite Martian S1 E37 "Uncle Martins Wisdom Tooth". York played Lillie Langtry (with Peter Whitney as Judge Roy Bean) in the 1965 episode "A Picture of a Lady" of the syndicated television anthology series, Death Valley Days. York was featured in five episodes of Burke's Law between 1964 and 1965, and made two guest appearances on Perry Mason, including the role of Ursula Quigley in the 1965 episode "The Case of the Wrongful Writ" and as co-defendant Bobbi Dane in the 1966 episode "The Case of the Sausalito Sunrise".

She appeared as Noble Niolani, a military leader from a matriarchal society where males were subjugated, in Lost in Space Season 2, Episode 25 "The Colonists" (1966). She also appeared in the Green Acres segment “The Agricultural Student;” and in “Marry Me, Marry Me”, a 1966 episode of Gomer Pyle, U.S.M.C..

On Batman she appeared as Lydia Limpit in episodes 29 and 30 "The Bookworm Turns/While Gotham City Burns" (1966). She continued to act in films and on television, with TV appearances including Hot in Cleveland (as British matriarch Lady Natalie), and The Mindy Project.

She appeared on Bewitched as a statue of the goddess Venus which came to life and became Samantha and Darrin's maid in season 8 episode 5, "Bewitched, Bothered and Baldoni" (1971), which became infamous because of her skimpy costumes. York also appeared in two episodes of Adam-12, "Reason to Run", Season 3 episode 25, and "Substation", Season 4, Episode 20.

She appeared on Columbo in Season 5, episode 1, "Forgotten Lady", as Sgt. Leftkowitz in 1975.

She appeared as Queen Medusa during the second season of Jason of Star Command in 1979: in episode 3 "Web of the Star Witch", in episode 10 "Little Girl Lost", and in episode 11 "Mimi's Secret".

In March 1991, York made guest appearances on All My Children, One Life to Live, and Santa Barbara.

=== Other pursuits ===
York also worked as a fitness/nutrition expert and a gourmet cook.

== Personal life and death ==
York never married, and once joked that "Like Cinderella, I always wanted to marry the handsome prince...but they don't make glass slippers in size ten!" However, she was the decade-long companion to director Vincent Sherman until his death in 2006. She died on January 6, 2017, in Van Nuys, California from cancer, aged 80. She had been working on her autobiography.

== Filmography ==
Film
| Year | Title | Role | Notes |
|---|---|---|---|
| 1961 | The Right Approach | Freer's Secretary | Uncredited |
| 1961 | The Sergeant Was a Lady | Tina Baird | |
| 1962 | The Interns | Verna | Uncredited |
| 1962 | It's Only Money | Sexy Girl | |
| 1962 | Secret File: Hollywood | Nan Torr | |
| 1963 | The Nutty Professor | College Student | Uncredited |
| 1963 | A New Kind of Love | | Uncredited |
| 1964 | Bedtime Story | Gina | |
| 1964 | The Disorderly Orderly | Nurse | Uncredited |
| 1965 | Mutiny in Outer Space | Capt. Stevens | |
| 1965 | Tickle Me | Mildred | Uncredited |
| 1965 | The Family Jewels | Air Hostess | |
| 1965 | Space Probe Taurus | Dr. Lisa Wayne | |
| 1966 | Gomer Pyle, U.S.M.C. | Alice Borden | Marry Me, Marry Me S03E10 |
| 1967 | The Ride to Hangman's Tree | Connie | Uncredited |
| 1967 | Lost In Space | Noble Niolani | The Colonists S02E25 |
| 1968 | Green Acres | Terry Harper | |
| 1968 | The Wild Wild West | Dr. Sara Gibson | "The Night of the Pelican" |
| 1970 | Cannon for Cordoba | Sophia | |
| 1970 | Land of the Giants | Dr. Virella North | "Doomsday" |
| 1971 | The Odd Couple | Sharon | They Use Horse Radish, Don't They |
| 1971 | Welcome Home, Soldier Boys | Lydia | |
| 1971 | Bewitched | Venus | Bewitched, Bothered and Baldoni S08E05 |
| 1972 | Mission Impossible | Waitress | Episode: Break |
| 1972 | Adam-12 | Kathy Benson | S4E20: Sub-station |
| 1973 | The Doll Squad | Sabrina Kincaid | |
| 1974 | The Centerfold Girls | Melissa | (segment "The Second Story") |
| 1975 | Half a House | Jessica | |
| 1975 | Columbo | Sgt. Leftkowitz | Episode: Forgotten Lady |
| 1978 | Zero to Sixty | Mrs. Finch | |
| 1983 | Cracking Up | Marie Du Bois | |
| 1987 | The Underachievers | June Patterson | |
| 1992 | Marilyn Alive and Behind Bars | Marilyn Monroe | |
| 1999 | The Big Tease | Elegant Woman | |
| 2000 | The Family Man | Lorraine | |
| 2003-2004 | King of Queens | Arthur Spooner's date - Evelyn | “Animal Attraction” Penguins “Multiple Plots” |
| 2005 | Las Vegas | Suzy Socal | “The Lie Is Cast” |
| 2005 | Miracle at Sage Creek | Mrs. Stanley | |
| 2005 | Hercules in Hollywood | Hera | |
| 2010 | Astro Zombies: M3 - Cloned | Sabrina | |
| 2017 | Ten Violent Women: Part Two | Gloria | (final film role) |
