= The Sermon of St. Francis =

Poem by Henry Wadsworth Longfellow

"The Sermon of St. Francis" is a poem by American poet Henry Wadsworth Longfellow (1807–1882). It is part of his collection Birds of Passage.

== Synopsis ==
The poem relates the story of Francis of Assisi, who tries to teach a flock of birds about the wonders of God. The birds flock to Saint Francis's parish every day to ask for food, and it is then that Saint Francis teaches them of these things. Although he does not believe that the birds understand him, Francis is able to bring himself peace by doing this.

Longfellow wrote the poem in 1875. It was included in an anthology he edited titled Poems of Places in 1877 and also republished after his death in Through Italy with the Poets in 1908.

According to scholar William Charvat, the poem is like many of Longfellow's later writings in that it touches upon the poet's struggle with fame. Like the birds in the poem, he questions if his readers will understand his message.
