= Clarence A. Shoop =

United States Air Force general

Clarence Adelbert Shoop
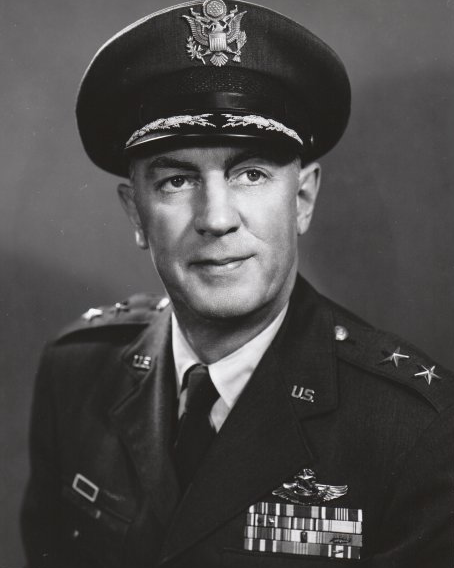
- Born: May 10, 1907; Clarendon, Pennsylvania, U.S.
- Died: January 27, 1968 (aged 60); Beverly Hills, California, U.S.
- Spouse: Julie Bishop (m. 1944)
- Children: 3, including Pamela Susan Shoop
- Military career
- Allegiance: United States
- Branch: United States Air Force
- Rank: Major General
- Nickname: Shoopy
- Commands: 7th Photo Reconnaissance Group; 46th Military Airlift Group; 146th Fighter-Bomber Wing; Edwards Air Force Base; California Air National Guard
- Awards: Distinguished Flying Cross; Air Medal; Presidential Unit Citation; American Defense Medal; Army Commendation Medal; WWII Victory Medal; American Campaign Medal; European–African–Middle Eastern Campaign Medal; Croix de Guerre with Palm; Vietnam Expeditionary Force Medal; California Medal of Merit; California Commendation Medal

Clarence Adelbert Shoop (May 10, 1907 – January 27, 1968) was a long serving pilot in the California Air National Guard, an American test pilot, and a mustang who eventually rose to rank of major general and post-war commander of the California Air National Guard. His Guard unit was federalized into the United States Army Air Corps in World War II, where he flew photo reconnaissance missions. After the war he returned to work as an executive at Hughes Aircraft Company while continuing as an officer in the California Air National Guard.

== Early career ==
Shoop enlisted in the Pennsylvania Army National Guard in 1927. By 1930 he was a cadet in the United States Army Air Corps (forerunner of the United States Air Force), learning how to fly at March Field. A difficult student, Shoop took a trainer aircraft for his first solo flight without permission. On landing, the aircraft entered a ground loop, suffering minor damage. Shoop was convicted by court-martial and sentenced to six months' hard labor at Alcatraz Federal Penitentiary. His sentence was subsequently rescinded but he was expelled from the Army Air Corps cadet program.

Shoop was able to join the California Air National Guard training program at Griffith Park Aerodrome, where he earned his Aviator badge. By 1933, Shoop was a first lieutenant assigned to the Guard's 115th Observation Squadron.

== Test pilot ==
During those years, Shoop was assigned as an Air Corps representative to Douglas Aircraft Company. Just prior to Pearl Harbor, Shoop started his 15-year career as a test pilot and was involved with testing the then-experimental P-38 Lightning. He went on to test the Lockheed Constellation, Bell P-59 Airacomet, and Lockheed XP-80.

In 1943, he met his future wife, actress Julie Bishop, while on the set of Princess O'Rourke. The couple married in 1944 in the Falls Church, Virginia, residence of TWA president Jack Frye. At the invitation of Eleanor Roosevelt, the couple had a short honeymoon at her home in Hyde Park, New York.

== Eighth Air Force ==
During World War II, Shoop was assigned to the 55th Fighter Wing. The day before D-Day, he took command of the 7th Photo Reconnaissance Group, then under the Eighth Air Force. Shoop piloted (along with his group) the first photo reconnaissance flights over Omaha Beach. General Eisenhower credited Shoop and his group's intelligence collection for their tracking of the allied invasion's progress. The group was awarded the Distinguished Unit Citation for their work. He was later promoted to colonel.

== After World War Two ==
In May 1945, he returned to Muroc Army Airfield (later to become Edwards Air Force Base), where in 1953 he tested the Convair YF-102 Delta Dagger. From 1946 to 1950 he commanded the 46th Military Airlift Group.

From 1954 to 1957, Shoop commanded the 146th Fighter-Bomber Wing, which were then flying Sabrejets, as a One-star General. In his civilian career, concurrent with his duty in the Air National Guard, he worked as chief pilot and director of aircraft operations at Hughes Aircraft Company. By 1960, Shoop had his second star and served as the Chief of Staff for the state Air National Guard. Shoop eventually became a Vice President at Hughes Aircraft.

Throughout his career, Shoop worked as technical advisor on a number of films including So Proudly We Hail!, Blaze of Noon, Gallant Journey, Saigon, One Minute to Zero, and Jet Pilot. Shoop had also appeared infrequently on The Bob Cummings Show. The show's star, Robert Cummings, had been an Air Force pilot and flight instructor at Edwards Air Force Base while Shoop was the base's commander. He appeared as a contestant on You Bet Your Life hosted by Groucho Marx on an episode that first aired December 22, 1955.

Shoop died of pneumonia in January 1968 at the age of 60.
