= National Charity League =

National volunteering organization

- Formation: 1925
- Headquarters: Costa Mesa, California, U.S.
- Location: 32 states
- Members: 72,000 members in 300 chapters
- Website: nationalcharityleague.org

The National Charity League Inc. (NCL) is a Costa Mesa, California-based national non-profit organization designed to encourage community service and volunteering opportunities for mothers and their daughters in grades 7–12. Founded in 1925 and incorporated in 1958, the group focuses on community service, leadership development and cultural experiences.

As of November 2019, it had over 72,000 members in 27 states, who reportedly contributed more than 2.7 million volunteer hours in 2018.

== History ==
NCL was established in 1925 in Los Angeles, California as "The Charity League". It was originally founded as a women's organization in support of the American Red Cross. In 1938 the daughters of the women formed their own group, called the Ticktockers. In 1947, both groups united and started calling themselves the National Charity League. In 1958, the NCL was reorganized and was incorporated.

== Philanthropic activity ==
The individual NCL chapters partner with local charities to volunteer and hold fundraisers to support the charities. The NCL is designed for mothers and their daughters, students in grades 7–12, to volunteer together.

== Operations ==
As of December 2019, the non-profit's headquarters were in Costa Mesa, CA. As of September 2026, it had over 72,000 members in 300 chapters across 32 states.
