= Don Winslow (disambiguation) =

Don Winslow is an American author.

Don Winslow may also refer to a fictional character who is the hero of

- Don Winslow of the Coast Guard, a film serial
- Don Winslow of the Navy, a film serial
- Don Winslow of the Navy (comic strip)
- Don Winslow of the Navy (radio program)
