= Loker (disambiguation) =

Loker may refer to:

== Places ==
Loker, a village in Belgium

== People with the surname ==
- John Loker (born 1938), contemporary British abstract painter
- Katherine Loker (1915–2008), American heiress and philanthropist
- Suzanne Loker (1948–2025), American academic, apparel design scholar
- Valerie Loker (born 1980), Canadian badminton player

== Other uses ==
- Loker (Curonian king)
- Cromwell Field and Loker Stadium
- Loker Hydrocarbon Research Institute
