= Don Terry =

American actor (1902–1988)

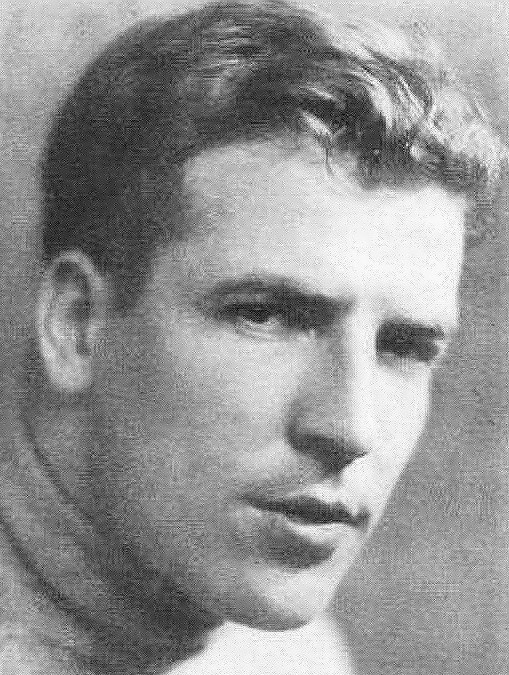
- Terry in 1928
- Born: Donald Prescott Loker; August 8, 1902; Natick, Massachusetts, U.S.
- Died: October 6, 1988 (aged 86); Oceanside, California, U.S.
- Occupation: Actor
- Years active: 1928–1943
- Spouse: Katherine Bogdanovich (m. 1940)
- Children: 2

Don Terry (born Donald Prescott Loker, August 8, 1902 – October 6, 1988) was an American film actor, best known for his lead appearances in B films and serials in the 1930s and early 1940s. Perhaps his best-known role is Naval Commander Don Winslow in two Universal Pictures serials of the early 1940s, Don Winslow of the Navy (1942) and Don Winslow of the Coast Guard (1943).

== Early life and background ==
Terry was born Donald Loker in Natick, Massachusetts, in 1902. He was a 1927 graduate of Norwich University. Some sources give the family name as Locher, perhaps confusing him with actor Charles Locher who became famous as Jon Hall; the Loker spelling is correct, as many charitable enterprises bear the Loker name, as detailed below.

Don Terry was discovered while visiting Los Angeles as a tourist. During the visit, he hoped to see some film stars, but had been disappointed. Nearing the end of his trip, he decided to have lunch at Hollywood's Café Montmartre since it was a favorite of many in the film industry. Terry thought he might finally see a film star while having lunch, but found only other tourists who had the same hope. However, Fox screenwriter Charles Francis Coe was at the restaurant and happened to see Terry and thought of the screenplay he had just completed, based on his 1927 novel. Coe introduced himself and asked Terry if he was in the film industry. He gave Terry his business card and invited him to the Fox lot for a screen test. Terry went to the lot expecting only to be able to see some film stars. When Terry's screen test came out of the film laboratory, he was signed as the lead in the 1928 film Me, Gangster, the screenplay Coe had just written.

== Film career ==
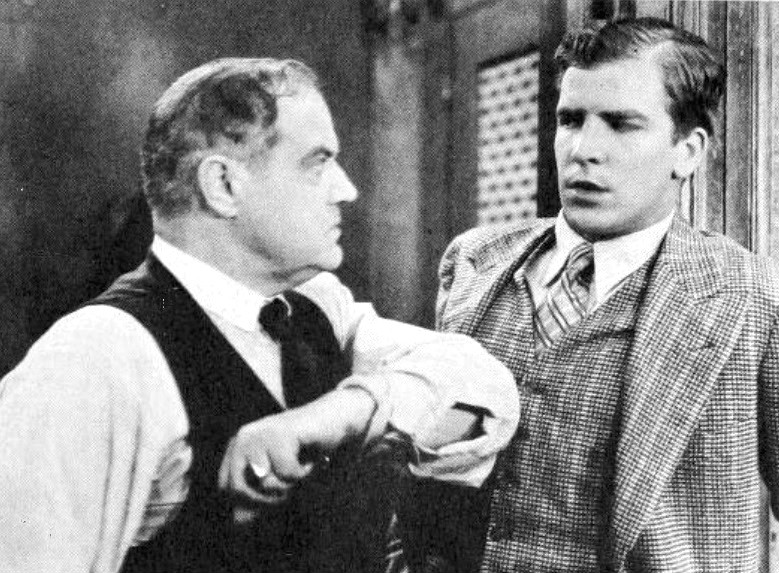
Don Terry on his film debut in Me, Gangster (1928), opposite Anders Randolph

Known for his "typical clean-cut American hero roles," he was signed by Columbia Pictures as a possible replacement for the studio's veteran action star Jack Holt. Terry was one of several tough-guy heroes (including Victor Jory, Paul Kelly, and Charles Quigley) who portrayed "bare-knuckled, sleeves-rolled-up hard hats" in various films. Terry's Columbia "B" features include A Fight to the Finish (1937), Paid to Dance (1937), Who Killed Gail Preston? (1937), When G-Men Step In (1938), and Squadron of Honor (1938). Terry's portrayals are complemented by his distinct New England accent, which he never completely lost.

Don Terry also became a star of serials, his first chapter play being The Secret of Treasure Island, released by Columbia in 1938. He was one of the three male leads in Universal's western serial Overland Mail (1942). Terry's best-known serials are the "Don Winslow" maritime adventures of the early 1940s, Don Winslow of the Navy (1942) and Don Winslow of the Coast Guard (1943).

Terry signed with Universal in 1939, appearing in an incidental role in the W. C. Fields comedy You Can't Cheat an Honest Man. The studio kept him busy in various roles, large and small. Terry appeared in Danger in the Pacific (1942) as a scientist, co-starring Louise Allbritton. Other credits include Fugitives (1929), Border Romance (1929), Barnacle Bill (1941), Sherlock Holmes in Washington (1943), and White Savage (1943), his last screen appearance before enlisting in the U.S. Navy. He rose to the rank of Lieutenant Commander and was awarded the Purple Heart. He left the Navy in 1946 and never returned to the film industry.

== Post-film life and career ==
In 1941, Terry married Katherine Bogdanovich, a daughter of the founder of StarKist tuna. Bogdanovich, a 1940 graduate of University of Southern California (USC), shared an interest in Olympic competition with her husband. She tried out for the 1932 Olympics as a sprinter. The couple had two daughters, and after completing his World War II service, Terry dropped his screen name and went to work for StarKist as vice president of public and industrial relations.

Loker retired from the company in 1965, and the couple then devoted their time and energies to various philanthropic projects by establishing the Donald and Katherine Loker Foundation. The foundation supported many projects, with a special emphasis on the colleges that were the Lokers' alma maters. They supported USC as board members of long standing, and with financial gifts of more than $30 million over a period of time. The Lokers were longtime friends of Richard and Pat Nixon and were also supporters of the Nixon Library. Despite the Lokers' lack of experience in chemistry, Carl Franklin, who was at the time USC's legal vice president, referred them to the university's hydrocarbon research institute, which was established in 1978 with the Lokers' financial aid. In 1983, it was renamed Loker Hydrocarbon Research Institute in their honor.

He died at Oceanside, California on October 6, 1988, aged 86. After his death, his widow continued the couple's philanthropic efforts until her death in 2008.

== Partial filmography ==
- Me, Gangster (1928) - Jimmy Williams
- Blindfold (1928) - Buddy Brower
- Fugitives (1929) - Dick Starr
- The Valiant (1929) - Policeman (uncredited)
- Border Romance (1929) - Bob Hamlin
- Lady with a Past (1932) - Party Guest (uncredited)
- Whistlin' Dan (1932) - Bob Reid
- The Billion Dollar Scandal (1933) - Boxer in Fight Montage (uncredited)
- Her First Mate (1933) - Purser, Albany Night Boat (uncredited)
- A Fight to the Finish (1937) - Duke Mallor
- A Dangerous Adventure (1937) - Tim Sawyer
- Paid to Dance (1937) - William Dennis
- Who Killed Gail Preston? (1937) - Tom Kellogg
- When G-Men Step In (1938) - Fred Garth
- The Secret of Treasure Island (1938, serial) - Larry Kent
- Squadron of Honor (1938) - District Attorney Don Blane
- You Can't Cheat an Honest Man (1939) - Ping-Pong Player (uncredited)
- Barnacle Bill (1941) - Dixon
- Mutiny in the Arctic (1941) - Cole
- In the Navy (1941) - Reef (uncredited)
- Tight Shoes (1941) - Haystack, Reporter (uncredited)
- Hold That Ghost (1941) - Strangler (uncredited)
- Don Winslow of the Navy (1942, serial) - Cmdr. Don Winslow
- Valley of the Sun (1942) - Lieutenant (uncredited)
- Unseen Enemy (1942) - Canadian Army Captain William Flynn Hitchcock, aka Bill Flinn, posing as Captain Wilhelm Roering
- Drums of the Congo (1942) - Captain Kirk Armstrong
- Escape from Hong Kong (1942) - Rusty
- Danger in the Pacific (1942) - Dr. David Lynd
- Top Sergeant (1942) - Sgt. Dick "Rusty" Manson
- Overland Mail (1942, serial) - Buckskin Bill Burke
- Moonlight in Havana (1942) - Eddie Daniels
- Sherlock Holmes in Washington (1943) - Howe
- Don Winslow of the Coast Guard (1943, serial) - Cmdr. Don Winslow
- White Savage (1943) - Chris (final film role)
