= Katherine Loker =

American philanthropist (1915–2008)

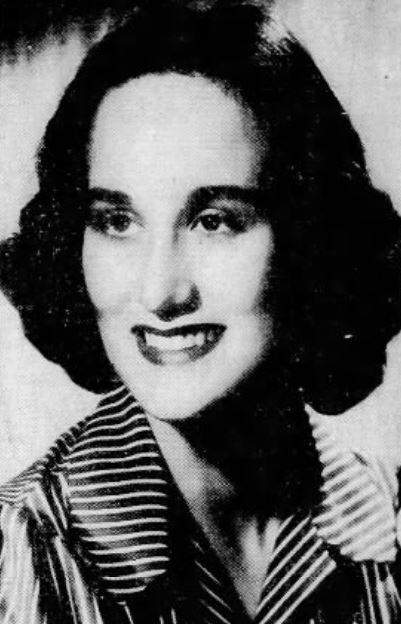
- Katherine Loker in 1940
- Born: Katherine Ann Bogdanovich; August 13, 1915; San Pedro, Los Angeles, California, US
- Died: June 26, 2008 (aged 92); Oceanside, California, US
- Education: University of Southern California
- Occupation: Philanthropist
- Spouse: Don Loker (m. 1940; died 1988)
- Children: 2

Katherine Loker (August 13, 1915 – June 26, 2008) was an American heiress and philanthropist. She donated tens of millions of dollars to fund university programs and infrastructure improvement at California State University, Dominguez Hills, Harvard University, and the University of Southern California (USC). She also made significant contributions to the California Museum of Science and Industry, the California Hospital Medical Center in Los Angeles, the Donald P. Loker Cancer Treatment Center, the Los Angeles Music Center, and the Richard Nixon Library in Yorba Linda, among other institutions. She was honored in 1996 with the Harvard Alumni Association Medal and in 2007 received the Presidential Medallion, the highest award of USC. Loker was awarded an honorary doctorate from USC in 1997 and an honorary Doctor of Humane Letters degree from the Harvard in 2000. In 1999, The New York Times spotlighted her leading role in philanthropy. The rose 'Katherine Loker' is named in her honor as are many facilities in California and Massachusetts.

== Early life, education, and family ==
Katherine Ann Bogdanovich was born on August 13, 1915, in San Pedro, a village in Los Angeles, California, to Antoinette (née Simić, or Antonia Simich) and Martin Joseph Bogdanovich. Her parents were immigrants from Komiža on the island of Vis in Croatia and moved to the United States in 1908. Her father began their life in San Pedro, working on a fishing boat. In 1914, he opened the California Fish Company and began buying and selling fish from other fishermen; in 1917, he opened a cannery, known as the French Sardine Company, which would be renamed StarKist in the 1940s. Bogdanovich was one of seven siblings. She had an older brother and six sisters.

During her junior year at San Pedro High School in 1932, Bogdanovich, who was a sprinter, tried out for the Olympic Games, but did not qualify. After graduating high school, she enrolled at the University of Southern California (USC), graduating in 1940 with a degree in English. Soon after her graduation, on August 12, 1940, in Skowhegan, Maine, Bogdanovich married Donald Loker, an actor who used the stage name Don Terry. The couple made their home on the Palos Verdes Peninsula, where they raised two daughters, Deborah and Katherine. Terry acted in films until enlisting in the United States Navy during World War II. After the war he did not return to acting, but joined StarKist as director of public and industrial relations. Following his retirement in 1965, he worked as a private investor and the couple became involved in philanthropy.

== Philanthropy ==
In that year, 1965, Loker became one of the founders of the California Museum of Science and Industry. Along with Catherine Edgerton and Mattie Kinsey, among others, they established The Muses, a group of women dedicated to supporting the facility. The museum would name individual areas and buildings in honor of Edgerton, Loker, and Kinsey.

As an heir to the StarKist fortune, Loker and her husband supported USC with more than $30 million in donations over the years. In 1977, they were the primary donors for the hydrocarbon research institute of USC, donating $15 million for the project. The Donald P. and Katherine B. Loker Hydrocarbon Institute, dedicated in 1979, was the first university facility of its kind in the United States, and was named in their honor in 1984. In 1983, to assist George A. Olah, future winner of the Nobel Prize in Chemistry, in his research, they endowed the Donald P. and Katherine B. Loker Chair in Organic Chemistry for him with a $1 million donation. They simultaneously gave a matching donation to Harvard to establish an English chair.

Interested in education and opportunities, the couple created the Donald and Katherine Loker Foundation in 1986. Through the foundation, they contributed to the California Hospital Medical Center, the California Science Center, the Los Angeles Music Center, and other organizations, such as the U.S. Olympic Team. The following year, they donated $500,000 toward completion of the student union at USC. They were founding members of the foundation to create the California State University, Dominguez Hills, and donated funds to build a new student union for the school. The Donald P. Loker Cancer Treatment Center of the California Hospital Medical Center was renamed in her husband's honor and they continued to support it over the years.

When her husband died in 1988, Loker continued with their philanthropy. In the late 1980s, she donated funds for the construction of the California Academy of Mathematics and Science, a magnet school operated on the campus of California State University, Dominguez Hills. In 1990, she gave $7 million to develop and construct the Katherine Bogdanovich Loker Wing of the hydrocarbon research institute at USC. In the 1990s, she funded the Katherine Bogdanovich Loker Commons, in the lower level of Memorial Hall at Harvard. She provided funding to renovate the Harry Elkins Widener Memorial Library, rebuild the Memorial Hall tower, and support women's athletics at Harvard. The main reading room of the Widener Library was named in her honor for donations totaling approximately $30 million to the university. In 1993, she endowed a fund for California State University, Dominguez Hills, with a $200,000 gift, the largest merit scholarship in the school's history at that time.

In 2001, Loker donated $3.4 million to USC's athletics department to build the Katherine B. Loker Track and Field Stadium. The following year, she gave $4 million to expand the USC student center, which was named the Katherine B. and Donald P. Loker Student Union. Loker met with officials at the California Hospital Medical Center in 2003 to discuss the need in Downtown Los Angeles for a health center for women. She donated $1.5 million to the hospital to establish a neonatal intensive care unit and $3.5 million toward building a women's center. A good friend of Richard and Pat Nixon, she donated $7 million to build an addition replicating the East Room of the White House for the Richard Nixon Library in Yorba Linda, California. Opened in 2004, the addition to the library was officially known as the Katherine B. Loker Center. She donated $1.5 million in honor of her husband to establish the Donald P. Loker Acting Fellowship at the USC School of Theatre in 2006.

== Awards and honors ==
Loker received many awards and honors for her philanthropy. In 1993, she was recognized by the California State Legislature's Senate Rules Committee for her philanthropic work throughout the state. Harvard recognized her commitment by awarding her the Harvard Alumni Association Medal in 1996 and an honorary doctorate of humane letters in 2000. She was similarly recognized with an honorary doctorate from USC in 1997, and in 2007 received the Presidential Medallion, USC's highest honor. She was awarded an honorary degree from California State University, Dominguez Hills, in 1999, and that year was recognized by The New York Times for her philanthropy. In 2009, the Loker Medical Arts Pavilion on the ground floor of the California Hospital Medical Center was named in her honor.

== Death and legacy ==
Loker died on June 26, 2008, in Oceanside, California, five days after having a stroke. Her funeral was held at Mary Star of the Sea Catholic Church in San Pedro on July 2.

Rosa 'Katherine Loker' a floribunda garden rose, was named in her honor in 1978. In 2012, the Los Angeles Center for Women's Health, for which Loker had provided funding nearly a decade before, opened at 1513 S. Grand Avenue, Los Angeles.
