= George Andrew Olah =

Hungarian-American chemist (1927–2017)

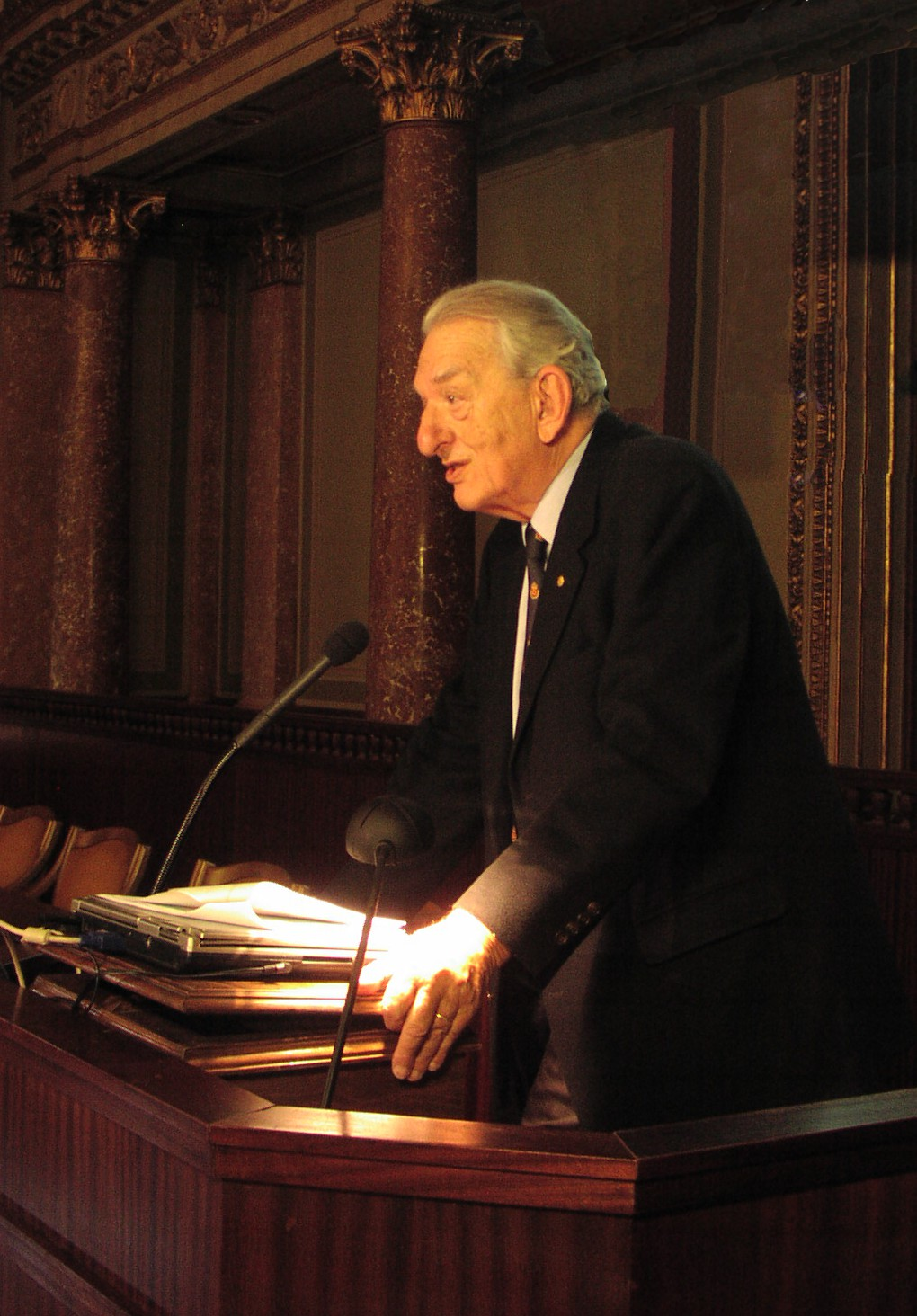
- Olah in 2009
- Born: Oláh András György; May 22, 1927; Budapest, Hungary
- Died: March 8, 2017 (aged 89); Beverly Hills, California, U.S.
- Citizenship: Hungary; U.S.
- Education: Budapest University of Technology and Economics
- Known for: Carbocations via superacids
- Spouse: Judit Lengyel (m. 1949)
- Children: 2
- Awards: Tolman Award (1991); Nobel Prize in Chemistry (1994); Arthur C. Cope Award (2001); Order of the Rising Sun (2003); Priestley Medal (2005); Hungarian Order of Pro Merit (2006)
- Scientific career
- Fields: Chemistry
- Workplaces: Case Western Reserve University; University of Southern California

George Andrew Olah (born Oláh András György; May 22, 1927 – March 8, 2017) was a Hungarian-American chemist. His research involved the generation and reactivity of carbocations via superacids. For this research, Olah was awarded a Nobel Prize in Chemistry in 1994 "for his contribution to carbocation chemistry." He was also awarded the Priestley Medal, the highest honor granted by the American Chemical Society and F.A. Cotton Medal for Excellence in Chemical Research of the American Chemical Society in 1996.

After the Hungarian Revolution of 1956, he immigrated to the United Kingdom, which he left for Canada in 1964, finally resettling in the United States in 1965. According to György Marx, he was one of The Martians.

== Early life and education ==
Olah was born in Budapest, Hungary, on May 22, 1927, to a Jewish couple, Magda (Krasznai) and Gyula Oláh, a lawyer. After the high school of Budapesti Piarist Gimnazium, he studied under organic chemist Géza Zemplén at the Technical University of Budapest, now the Budapest University of Technology and Economics, where he earned M.S. and Ph.D. degrees in chemical engineering. From 1949 through 1954, he taught at the school as a professor of organic chemistry. In the subsequent two years, from 1954 to 1956, he worked at the research institute of the Hungarian Academy of Sciences, where he was associate scientific director and head of the department of organic chemistry.

== Career and research ==
As a result of the 1956 Hungarian Revolution, he and his family moved briefly to England and then to Canada, where he joined Dow Chemical in Sarnia, Ontario, with another Hungarian chemist, Stephen J. Kuhn. Olah's pioneering work on carbocations started during his eight years with Dow. In 1965, he returned to academia at Case Western Reserve University in Cleveland, Ohio, chairing the department of chemistry from 1965 to 1969, and from 1967 through 1977 he was the C. F. Maybery Distinguished Professor of Research in Chemistry. In 1971, Olah became a naturalized citizen of the United States. He then moved to the University of Southern California in 1977.

At USC, Olah was a distinguished professor and the director of the Loker Hydrocarbon Research Institute. Starting in 1980, he served as the Distinguished Donald P. and Katherine B. Loker Professor of Chemistry and later became a distinguished professor in USC's school of engineering. In 1994, Olah was awarded the Nobel Prize in Chemistry "for his contribution to carbocation chemistry". In particular, Olah's search for stable nonclassical carbocations led to the discovery of protonated methane stabilized by superacids, like FSO_{3}H-SbF_{5} ("Magic Acid").

CH_{4} + H^{+} → CH_{5}^{+}

Because these cations were able to be stabilized, scientists could now use infrared spectroscopy and nuclear magnetic resonance (NMR) spectroscopy to study them in greater depth, as well as use them as catalysts in organic synthesis reactions.

Olah, with Canadian chemist Saul Winstein, was also involved in a career-long battle with Herbert C. Brown of Purdue over the existence of so-called "nonclassical" carbocations – such as the norbornyl cation, which can be depicted as cationic character delocalized over several bonds. Olah's studies of the cation with NMR spectroscopy provided more evidence suggesting that Winstein's model of the non-classical cation, "featuring a pair of [delocalized] electrons smeared between three carbon atoms," was correct. Olah called the process of how some scientists in a debate discredit "their opponents by whatever means" as "sad."

In 1997, the Olah family formed an endowment fund (the George A. Olah Endowment) which grants annual awards to outstanding chemists, including the George A. Olah Award in Hydrocarbon or Petroleum Chemistry, formerly known as the ACS Award in Petroleum Chemistry. The awards are selected and administered by the American Chemical Society.

Later in his career, his research shifted from hydrocarbons and their transformation into fuel to the methanol economy, namely generating methanol from methane. He joined with Robert Zubrin, Anne Korin, and James Woolsey in promoting a flexible-fuel mandate initiative. In 2005, Olah wrote an essay promoting the methanol economy in which he suggested that methanol could be produced from hydrogen gas (H_{2}) and industrially derived or atmospheric carbon dioxide (CO_{2}), using energy from renewable and nuclear sources to power the production process.

== Personal life ==
He married Judit Ágnes Lengyel (Judith Agnes Lengyel) in 1949, and they had two children, György (George), born in Hungary in 1954, and Ronald, born in the U.S. in 1959. Olah died on March 8, 2017, at his home in Beverly Hills, California. After his death, the Hungarian government said that the "country has lost a great patriot and one of the most outstanding figures of Hungarian scientific life."

== Awards and honours ==
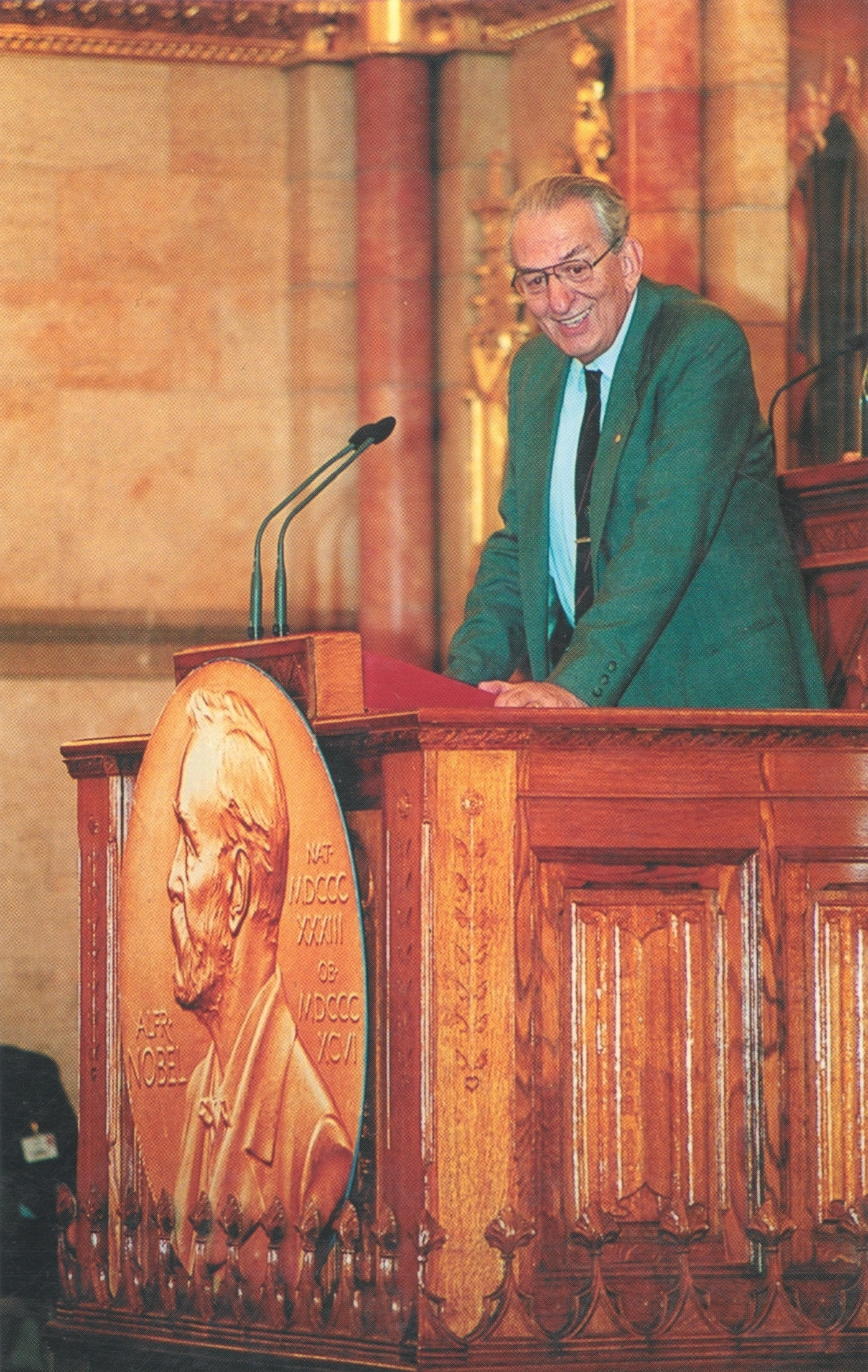
Olah in 2010

- 1970 ACS Henry Morley Medal
- 1989 California Scientist of the Year
- 1989 Roger Adams Award in Organic Chemistry
- 1993 Chemical Pioneer Award from the American Institute of Chemists
- 1994 Nobel Prize in Chemistry
- 1996 ACS F. A. Cotton Medal
- 1996 Golden Plate Award of the American Academy of Achievement
- 1997 Elected a Foreign Member of the Royal Society (ForMemRS) in 1997.
- 2001 Arthur C. Cope Award
- 2001 Elected a member of the American Philosophical Society
- 2005 Priestley Medal from the American Chemical Society

== See also ==
- The Martians (scientists)
- List of Jewish Nobel laureates
