= A Fight to the Finish (1937 film) =

1937 film by Charles C. Coleman

- Directed by: Charles C. Coleman
- Written by: Harold Shumate
- Based on: Taxi Wars by Harold Shumate
- Produced by: Ralph Cohn
- Starring: Don Terry; Rosalind Keith; Ward Bond
- Cinematography: George Meehan
- Edited by: Richard Fantl
- Music by: Morris Stoloff
- Production company: Columbia Pictures
- Distributed by: Columbia Pictures
- Release date: June 30, 1937
- Running time: 58 minutes
- Country: United States
- Language: English

A Fight to the Finish is a 1937 American drama film, directed by Charles C. Coleman. It stars Don Terry, Rosalind Keith, and Ward Bond.

== Cast ==
- Don Terry as Duke Mallor
- Rosalind Keith as Ellen Ames
- Ward Bond as Eddie Hawkins
- George McKay as Spudsy
- Wade Boteler as A. K. McDonald
- Lucille Lund as Mabel
- Tom Chatterton as Mayberry
- Ivan Miller as Captain Jameson
- Frank Sheridan as Prison Warden
- Harold Goodwin as Henry
