= Danger in the Pacific =

1942 film by Lewis D. Collins

- Directed by: Lewis D. Collins
- Written by: Walter Doniger; Maurice Tombragel; Neil P. Varnick
- Produced by: Ben Pivar
- Starring: Leo Carrillo; Don Terry; Louise Allbritton
- Cinematography: Walter Sickner
- Edited by: Maurice Wright
- Music by: H. J. Salter
- Distributed by: Universal Pictures
- Release date: June 10, 1942
- Running time: 60 minutes
- Country: United States
- Language: English

Danger in the Pacific is a 1942 espionage thriller set on a fictional island during World War II.

== Plot ==
As a cover for his true government mission, British intelligence agent Leo Marzell (Leo Carrillo) sponsors a scientific expedition led by Dr. David Lynd (Don Terry) to find a source for a wonder drug in the jungles of the South Pacific. When Lynd agrees to the expedition over the objections of his aviator fiancée Jane Claymore (Louise Allbritton), she breaks the engagement but secretly follows him to the island. Claymore attempts to halt Lynd's expedition so they can be married, but makes the mistake of recruiting Axis espionage agent Zambesi (Edgar Barrier) to help her. Native islander Tagani (Turhan Bey) is sent by Zambesi to murder Lynd, and sets loose a tiger that injures Marzell. Most of Lynd's guides are attacked by crocodiles, but one survives to kill Tagani. Claymore ends up saving Marzall, Lynd and the remainder of the expedition by contacting the Royal Air Force which sends a rescue squad.

== Cast ==
- Leo Carrillo as Leo Marzell
- Don Terry as Dr. David Lynd
- Louise Allbritton as Jane Claymore
- Andy Devine as Andy Parker
- Turhan Bey as Tagani
- Edgar Barrier as Zambesi
