= Don Winslow of the Coast Guard =

1943 film by Ray Taylor

- Directed by: Lewis D. Collins; Ray Taylor
- Screenplay by: Paul Huston; George H. Plympton; Griffin Jay
- Based on: Don Winslow of the Navy by Frank V. Martinek
- Produced by: Henry MacRae
- Starring: Don Terry; Walter Sande; Elyse Knox; June Duprez; Philip Ahn; Lionel Royce; Nestor Paiva
- Cinematography: John W. Boyle; William A. Sickner
- Edited by: Irving Birnbaum; Alvin Todd; Edgar Zane
- Music by: Milton Rosen
- Production company: Universal Pictures
- Distributed by: Universal Pictures
- Release date: April 6, 1943
- Running time: 13 chapters (245 minutes)
- Country: United States
- Language: English

Don Winslow of the Coast Guard is a 1943 Universal Pictures serial film based on the comic strip Don Winslow of the Navy by Frank V. Martinbek and sequel to the 1942 serial Don Winslow of the Navy. A version of the serial "edited especially for television" was shown on WNBT-TV beginning on February 19, 1950.

== Plot ==
After service at Pearl Harbor, Naval Commander Don Winslow, and his friend and junior officer, Lieutenant "Red" Pennington, are assigned to the Coast Guard. There, they are ordered to devote their activities to anti-fifth column work on the mainland. Winslow learns that The Scorpion, a fascist sympathizer, is in the payroll of the Japanese and is expected to lay the ground work for a Japanese attack on the Pacific coast. Constantly in peril and aided by Mercedes Colby, the daughter of a Navy Admiral, they investigate secret island-bases and battles with submarines and enemy planes.

== Cast ==
- Don Terry as Don Winslow
- Walter Sande as Red Pennington
- Elyse Knox as Mercedes Colby
- Philip Ahn as Hirota
- June Duprez as Tasmia
- Edgar Dearing as CP0 Ben Cobb
- Lionel Royce as Reichter
- Henry Victor as Heilrich
- Charles Wagenheim as Mussanti
- Nestor Paiva as The Scorpion

== Production ==
Frank V. Martinbek's comic strip Don Winslow of the Navy was approved by the U.S. Navy. The strip gained new meaning with the approach of World War II, which would also affect the serial: "Its presentation as a Universal serial in October 1941 – just before the infamous attack on Pearl Harbor in December – was one of the most timely contributions of the serial field."

== Chapter titles ==
1. Trapped in the Blazing Sea
2. Battling a U-Boat
3. The Crash in the Clouds
4. The Scorpion Strikes
5. A Flaming Target
6. Ramming the Submarine
7. Bombed in the Ocean Depths
8. Blackout Treachery
9. The Torpedo Strikes
10. Blasted from the Skies
11. A Fight to the Death
12. The Death Trap
13. Capturing the Scorpion

_{Source:}

== See also ==
- Don Winslow of the Navy
- Don Winslow of the Navy (comic strip)
- Don Winslow of the Navy (radio program)
