= Paid to Dance =

1937 film by Charles C. Coleman

- Lobby card
- Directed by: Charles C. Coleman
- Written by: Robert E. Kent
- Story by: Leslie T. White
- Produced by: Ralph Cohn
- Starring: Don Terry; Jacqueline Wells
- Cinematography: George Meehan
- Edited by: Byron Robinson
- Music by: Morris Stoloff
- Distributed by: Columbia Pictures
- Release date: December 11, 1937
- Running time: 55 minutes
- Country: United States
- Language: English

Paid to Dance (also known as Hard to Hold) is a 1937 American drama film starring Don Terry, Jacqueline Wells and Rita Hayworth.

== Plot ==
Government agents William Dennis and Joan Bradley are undercover, working to solve the disappearances of girls working as "taxi-dancers" of the many dance halls operated by Jack Miranda and his henchman Nifty. Dennis sets himself up as a theatrical booking agent, and shows his power by the opening and closing of Miranda's Paradise Club at will.

== Cast ==
- Don Terry as William Dennis
- Jacqueline Wells as Joan Bradley
- Rita Hayworth as Betty Morgan
- Arthur Loft as Jack Miranda
- Paul Stanton as Charles Kennedy
- Paul Fix as Nifty
- Louise Stanley as Phyllis Parker
- Ralph Byrd as Nickels Brown
- Beatrice Curtis as Frances Mitchell
- Bess Flowers as Suzy
- Beatrice Blinn as Lois
- Jane Hamilton as Evelyn
- Dick Curtis as Mike Givens
- Al Herman as Joe Krause
- Thurston Hall as Governor
- John Gallaudet as Barney Wilson
- Horace MacMahon as LaRue
- George Lloyd as Sanders
- Ruth Hilliard as Ruth Gregory
- Ann Doran as Rose Tervor
