= Wayne Kreklow =

American basketball player

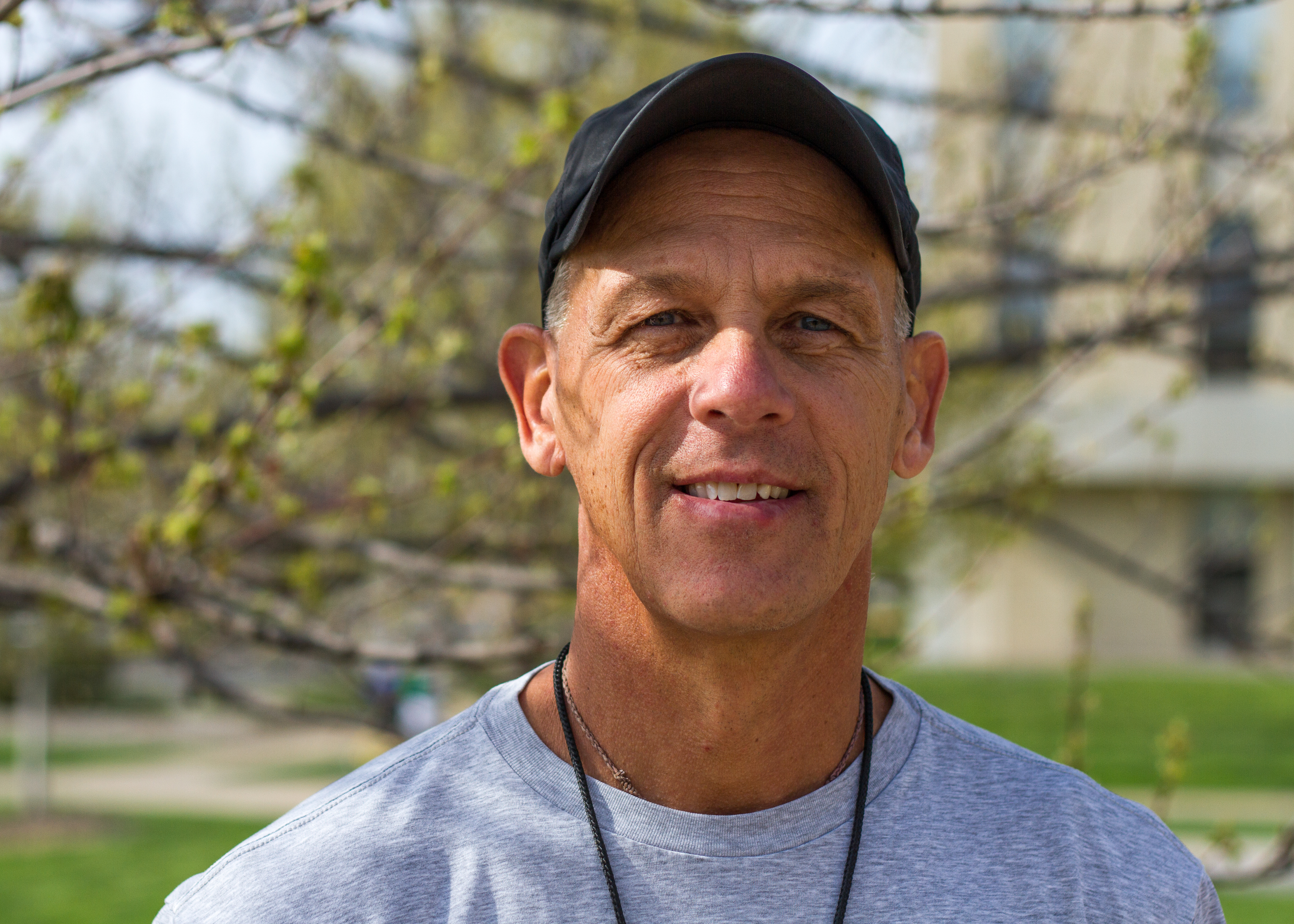
- Kreklow, Missouri head women's volleyball coach in 2014

Personal information
- Born: January 4, 1957 (age 69) Neenah, Wisconsin, U. S.
- Listed height: 6 ft 4 in (1.93 m)
- Listed weight: 175 lb (79 kg)

Career information
- High school: Neenah (Neenah, Wisconsin)
- College: Drake (1975–1979)
- NBA draft: 1979: 3rd round, 53rd overall pick
- Drafted by: Boston Celtics
- Position: Shooting guard
- Number: 20

Career history
- 1979–1980: Maine Lumberjacks
- 1980–1981: Boston Celtics

Career highlights
- First-team All-MVC (1979); Second-team All-MVC (1978)
- Stats at NBA.com
- Stats at Basketball Reference

Wayne R. Kreklow (born January 4, 1957) is an American volleyball coach and former professional basketball player. During the 1980–81 NBA regular season, Kreklow was a member of the Boston Celtics team that had won the 1981 NBA Finals. He was the women's volleyball coach at the University of Missouri from 2005 through the 2018 season. Kreklow retired in July 2019.

== Early life ==
Kreklow was born in Neenah, Wisconsin. Wayne is the son of Wayne Sr. (d. 2018) and Joanne. He is one of six Kreklow children. His father coached and taught for 42 years.

Kreklow played on the 1975 state championship basketball team at Neenah High School. Kreklow scored 23 points in Neenah's state quarterfinal loss in 1974. Kreklow led the 1975 Wisconsin State High School Basketball Tournament in scoring with 69 points, including 19 in Neenah's 64–55 victory over Milwaukee Marshall in the WIAA Class A final.

In leading Neenah to the 1975 WIAA state basketball title, Kreklow scored 499 points in 1974–1975 and 926 for his career. Kreklow was the 1975 Wisconsin Player of the Year. He also played volleyball in high school.

== Basketball career ==
=== College (1975–1979) ===
A 6-foot-4-inch (1.93 m) guard, Kreklow played basketball at Drake University in Des Moines, Iowa, a member of the Missouri Valley Conference. He was also recruited by Minnesota, Wisconsin and Marquette among others.

As a freshman in 1975–1976, Kreklow averaged 8.0 points and 2.9 rebounds and 2.2 assists for the 8–19 Drake Bulldogs under Coach Bob Ortegel. He averaged 11.2 points, 4.8 rebounds and 2.4 assists, with Drake finishing 10–17 as a sophomore. As a junior in 1977–1978, Kreklow averaged 15.2 points 3.2 rebounds and 2.6 assists, as Drake finished 6–22.

As a senior in 1978–1979, Kreklow averaged 19.5 points, 4.7 rebounds and 3.1 assists as Drake improved to 15–12.

Overall, Kreklow averaged 13.9 points, 3.5 rebounds and 2.6 assists in 109 career games at Drake, leaving Drake as the program's third leading all-time scorer.

=== Professional (1979–1983) ===
Kreklow was the 3rd round (53rd overall) pick of the Boston Celtics in the 1979 NBA draft.

Kreklow participated in the Celtics 1979 training camp, but he did not make the team. He played the 1979–80 season for the Maine Lumberjacks of the Continental Basketball Association, averaging 9.6 points per game.

In 25 NBA games with the Boston Celtics in 1980–81, Kreklow averaged 1.2 points per game. Kreklow was waived on January 21, 1981, and the Celtics went on to win the NBA Championship in May 1981.

"I was very much of a support player. I wasn't one of the main guys in the rotation," Kreklow said of his Celtic tenure. "My job was to make guys work as hard as they could in practice and challenge them, and make sure they were playing to their potential. That was my time — practice."

"It was a pretty remarkable group of guys. They were mature, they were professional," Kreklow added about the Celtic's Championship. "There's a reason that certain teams tend to win championships and be really successful because they're not only good players, but they have character and they're good people."

After being invited back to Boston camp and playing in 1985 for Sydney Supersonics in Australia, Kreklow played for the Wisconsin Flyers of the CBA in 1982–1983.

== Volleyball coaching ==
Kreklow coached Columbia College to NAIA national volleyball titles and undefeated seasons in 1998 and 1999.

Kreklow was the head women's volleyball coach of University of Missouri volleyball team from 2005 thru the 2018 season, and coached alongside his wife Susan since 2000. He retired from coaching in July 2019. The Tigers reached 14 NCAA Tournaments in the Kreklow's tenure.

"For me, I want to win," Kreklow said. "I want to win championships. I want to do all that kind of stuff. But that, to me, is the secondary by-product of doing things the right way."

== Career statistics ==
Legend
GP	Games played	GS	Games started	MPG	Minutes per game
FG%	Field goal percentage	3P%	3-point field goal percentage	FT%	Free throw percentage
RPG	Rebounds per game	APG	Assists per game	SPG	Steals per game
BPG	Blocks per game	PPG	Points per game	**Bold**	Career high

=== NBA ===
==== Regular season ====
Year	Team	GP	GS	MPG	FG%	3P%	FT%	RPG	APG	SPG	BPG	PPG
1980–81	Boston	25	0	4.0	.234	.250	.700	.5	.4	.1	.0	1.2

== Honors ==
- The Neenah Joint School District inducted Kreklow into their Hall of Fame in 2015.
- Kreklow was selected to the Wisconsin Basketball Coaches Association Hall of Fame in 2008.
- In 2016, Kreklow was inducted into the Missouri Sports Hall of Fame, along with his wife Susan.
