= Border Romance =

1929 film

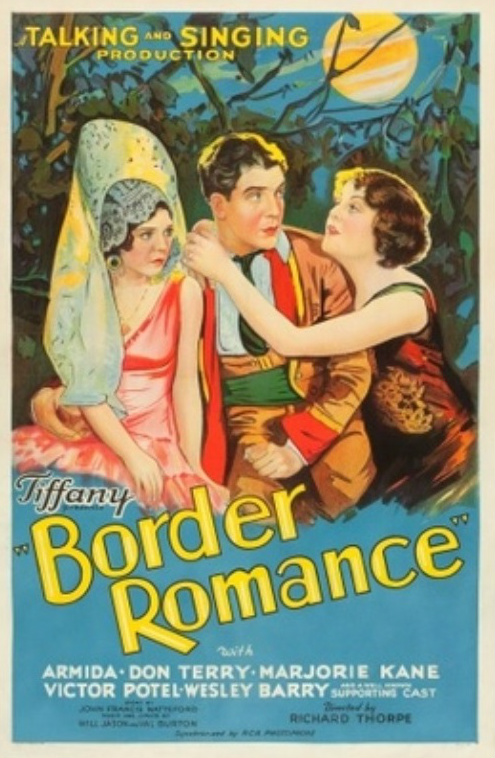
- Film poster
- Directed by: Richard Thorpe
- Screenplay by: Jack Natteford
- Produced by: Lester F. Scott Jr.
- Starring: Wally Wales
- Cinematography: Harry Zech
- Edited by: Richard Cahoon
- Music by: Al Short (uncredited)
- Production company: Tiffany Productions
- Release date: May 25, 1929
- Running time: 58 minutes
- Country: United States
- Languages: English and Spanish sound film

Border Romance is a 1929 American pre-Code Western romance film directed by Richard Thorpe. An early sound film, it stars Armida, Don Terry, Marjorie Kane, and Victor Potel.

A copy is preserved at the Library of Congress, Packard.

== Cast ==
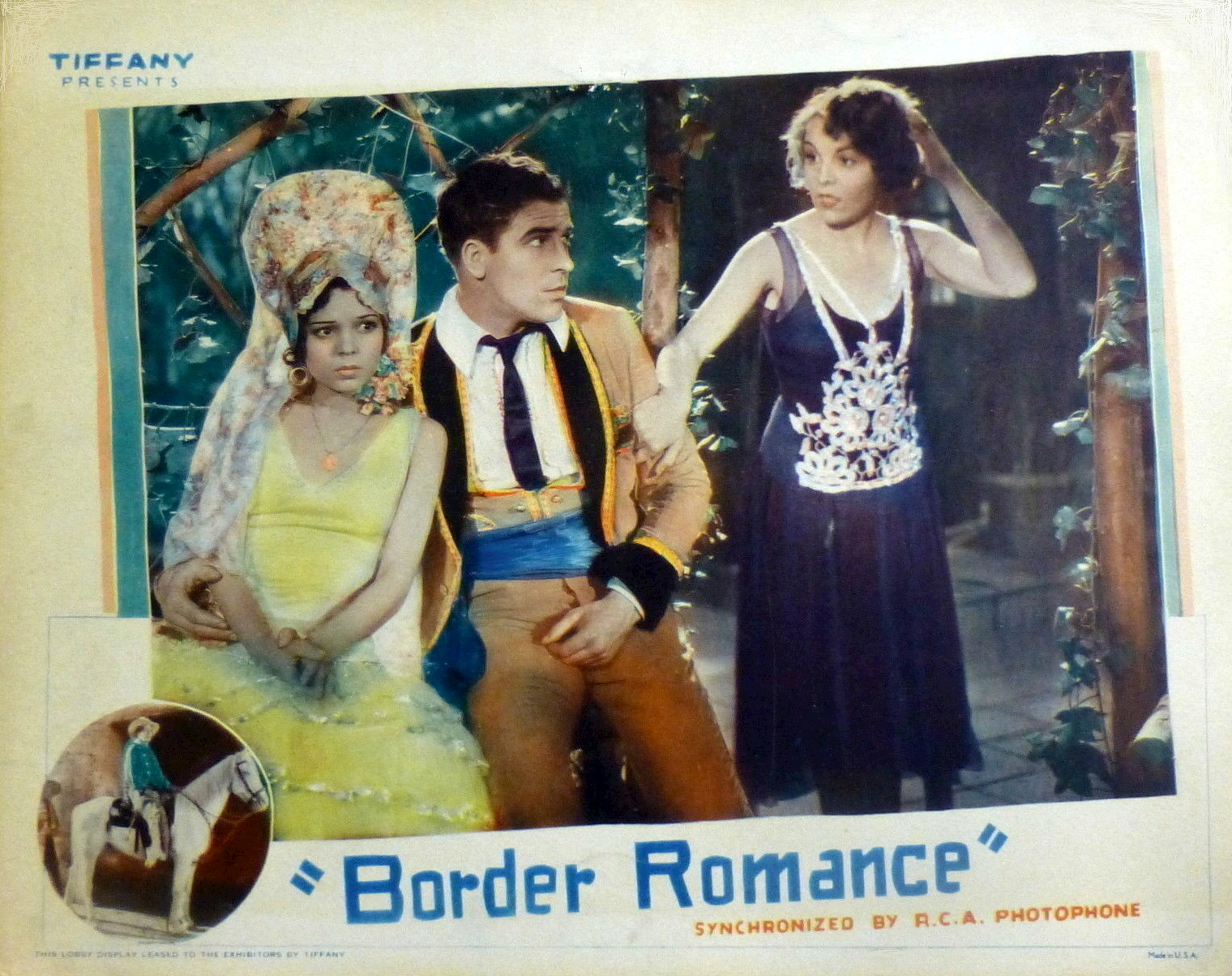
Lobby card

- Armida as Conchita Cortez
- Don Terry as Bob Hamlin
- Marjorie Kane as Nina
- Victor Potel as Slim
- Wesley Barry as Victor Hamlin
- J. Frank Glendon as Buck
- Harry von Meter as Captain of Rurales
- Willy Castello as Lieutenant of Rurales (credited as William Costello)
- Fred Burns as Rustler (uncredited)
- Jim Mason as Rustler (uncredited)

== See also ==
- List of early sound feature films (1926–1929)
