= When G-Men Step In =

1938 film by Charles C. Coleman

- Directed by: Charles C. Coleman
- Screenplay by: Arthur T. Horman
- Story by: Arthur T. Horman; Robert C. Bennett
- Produced by: Wallace MacDonald
- Starring: Don Terry; Julie Bishop; Robert Paige
- Cinematography: Henry Freulich
- Edited by: Al Clark
- Distributed by: Columbia Pictures
- Release date: March 17, 1938
- Running time: 60 minutes
- Country: United States
- Language: English

When G-Men Step In is a 1938 American action film, directed by Charles C. Coleman and starring Don Terry, Julie Bishop (billed as Jacqueline Wells), and Robert Paige. It released by Columbia Pictures.

== Cast ==
- Don Terry as Frederick 'Fred' Garth
- Julie Bishop as Marjory Drake
- Robert Paige as G-Man Bruce Garth
- Gene Morgan as G-Man Theodore Neale
- Paul Fix as Clip Phillips - Fred's Henchman
- Stanley Andrews as Preston
- Edward Earle as Morton
- Horace McMahon as Jennings
