= Me, Gangster =

1928 film directed by Raoul Walsh

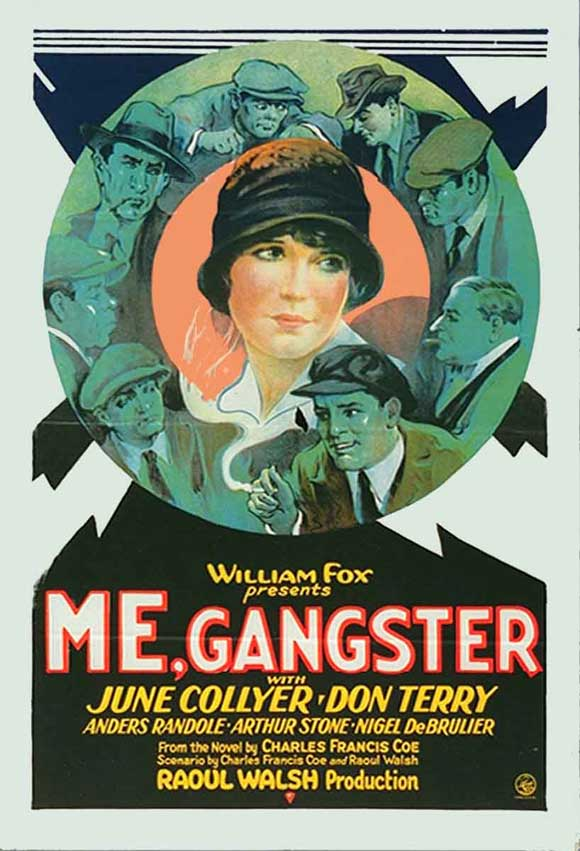
- Directed by: Raoul Walsh
- Screenplay by: Charles Francis Coe
- Starring: Don Terry, June Collyer, Anders Randolf
- Cinematography: Arthur Edeson
- Edited by: Louis R. Loeffler
- Production company: Fox Film Corporation
- Release date: October 20, 1928
- Running time: 70 minutes
- Country: United States
- Languages: Sound (Synchronized) (English Intertitles)

Me, Gangster is a 1928 American synchronized sound gangster film directed by Raoul Walsh. While the film has no audible dialogue, it was released with a synchronized musical score with sound effects using the sound-on-film movietone process. The film stars June Collyer, Don Terry, Anders Randolf and a young Carole Lombard.

== Plot ==
Jimmy Williams (Don Terry) grows up in the congested tenement district by New York’s East River docks. His father, Russ Williams (Anders Randolf), is a master stevedore and a man of influence among the dockworkers, but he can never quite master his son’s rebellious spirit. As Russ rises in political circles, Jimmy falls in with bad company. Idleness and resentment push Jimmy toward crime, and with his friend Danny (Al Hill), he commits a robbery, managing to evade the police.

Encouraged by this early success, Jimmy graduates from petty theft to working with a confidence gang, pulling in big money. Eventually, he tries a solo job—posing as a newspaper photographer to rob a factory owner (Gustav von Seyffertitz) of the payroll. Gaining access under the pretext of taking a publicity photograph, he convinces the unsuspecting owner to pose with the money. At the last moment, Jimmy strikes him, hides the cash inside a dummy camera, and makes his escape.

His luck runs out, however, when he is caught and brought to trial. His father’s political connections cannot help him this time. The stolen payroll—$50,000—is hidden in the wainscoting of the Williams home, but Jimmy refuses to reveal its location. Convicted, he is sent to prison for a two-year term. The prison scenes show him fingerprinted, assigned to labor, and carefully monitored during visiting hours, where convicts and their guests are kept under the watchful eye of a guard seated high like a croupier.

During his sentence, tragedy strikes when his mother, Lizzie Williams (Stella Adams), dies. The good influence of Mary Regan (June Collyer), his loyal sweetheart, begins to work on him, and Jimmy resolves to go straight. His parole is granted early for good behavior, and he intends to return the stolen $50,000 to its rightful owner.

But word of his plan reaches his former associates. Slicker (Herbert Ashton), Blonde Rosie (Carole Lombard), Danish Louie (Nigel De Brulier), and other gang members shadow him, determined to seize the loot. One thug follows him to Mary’s home, where Jimmy is attacked and beaten unconscious. Upstairs, “the Polack” (uncredited) hears the commotion and joins the fray, further complicating the melee.

The violence spills into the street, drawing the attention of Police Captain Dodd (Walter James) and his men. A full round-up follows: the gang is arrested, and the stolen cash is recovered. Jimmy’s father regains his political footing, Jimmy walks free of the gang’s influence, and he and Mary set out together, determined to build an honest life.

The film ends in the style of a diary entry—its narrator (posing as the anonymous author of this supposed autobiographical story) hoping that this story of crime, punishment, and redemption will serve as a warning that “you can’t beat the law.”

== Cast ==
- June Collyer as Mary Regan
- Don Terry as Jimmy Williams
- Anders Randolf as Russ Williams
- Carole Lombard as Blonde Rosie
- Stella Adams as Lizzie Williams
- Herbert Ashton as Slicker
- Joe Brown as himself
- Nigel De Brulier as Danish Louie
- Al Hill as Danny
- Walter James as Police Capt. Dodd

== Production ==
During the shooting of the picture, only one copy of the script existed, in the possession of director Raoul Walsh.

=== Casting ===
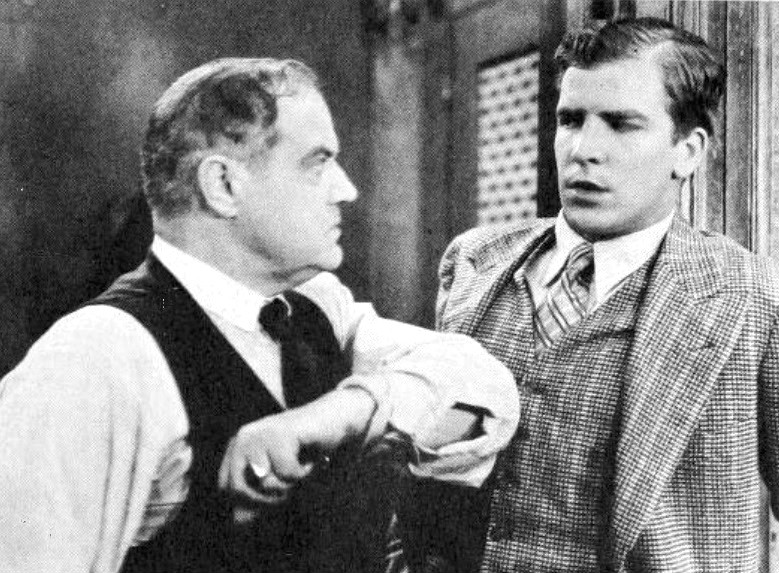
Don Terry and Anders Randolf in Me, Gangster (1928)

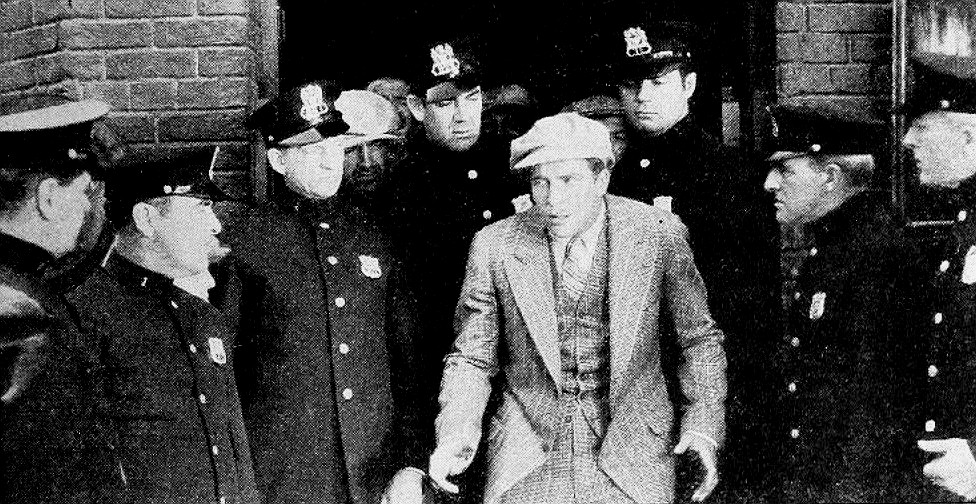
Still

Don Terry, making his film debut, was discovered at Hollywood's Café Montmartre by Fox screenwriter Charles Francis Coe who happened to see Terry and thought of the screenplay he had just completed. Coe introduced himself to Terry and asked if he was in the film industry. He gave Terry his business card and invited him to the Fox lot for a screen test. Terry went to the Fox lot expecting only to finally be able to see some film stars. When Terry's screen test came out of the film laboratory, he was signed as the lead in Me, Gangster, the screenplay Coe had just written.

An article in Silver Screen notes that Carole Lombard's casting in Me, Gangster finally eased the pressure her family had been putting on her to succeed. She would go on to become a leading Hollywood starlet in the 1930s.

== See also ==
- 1937 Fox vault fire
- List of Fox Film films
- List of early sound feature films (1926–1929)

== Preservation status ==
- No prints appear to survive making it a lost film.
