= Who Killed Gail Preston? =

1938 film directed by Leon Barsha

- Directed by: Leon Barsha
- Screenplay by: Robert Kent
- Produced by: Ralph Cohn
- Starring: Don Terry; Rita Hayworth; Robert Paige
- Cinematography: Henry Freulich
- Edited by: Byron Robinson
- Production company: Columbia Pictures
- Distributed by: Columbia Pictures
- Release date: February 24, 1938
- Running time: 61 minutes
- Country: United States
- Language: English

Who Killed Gail Preston? is a 1938 American crime film directed by Leon Barsha and starring Don Terry, Rita Hayworth, and Robert Paige.

== Plot ==
When singer Gail Preston is murdered at the Swing Swing Club, inspector Tom Kellogg takes the case and finds that many at the club disliked the victim. Suspicion at first falls on a man named Owen, but when is also found dead, bandleader Swing Traynor becomes the prime suspect. Discovering that Preston was killed by a gun rigged to a spotlight, Kellogg gathers all the suspects in a room and trains the spotlight on each.

== Cast ==
- Don Terry as Insp. Kellogg
- Rita Hayworth as Gail Preston
- Robert Paige as Swing Traynor
- Wyn Cahoon as Ann Bishop
- Gene Morgan as Cliff Connolly
