= Don Winslow of the Navy =

1942 film by Ray Taylor

- Directed by: Ford Beebe; Ray Taylor
- Screenplay by: Paul Huston; Griffin Jay
- Based on: Don Winslow of the Navy by Frank V. Martinek
- Produced by: Henry MacRae
- Starring: Don Terry; John Litel; Claire Dodd; Anne Nagel; Samuel S. Hinds; Walter Sande; Wade Boteler; Kurt Katch
- Cinematography: William A. Sickner
- Edited by: Joseph Glick; D. Patrick Kelley; Louis Sackin; Alvin Todd
- Music by: Charles Previn
- Production company: Universal Pictures
- Distributed by: Universal Pictures
- Release date: January 6, 1942
- Running time: 12 chapters (237 minutes)
- Country: United States
- Language: English

Don Winslow of the Navy is a 1942 Universal Pictures Serial film based on the comic strip Don Winslow of the Navy by Commander Frank V. Martinek. It was theatrically released in January 1942.

== Plot ==
Commander Don Winslow is returned to the Office of Naval Intelligence from his command of his cruiser to investigate strange events on the Pacific island of Tangita, noticeably a ship being torpedoed. He discovers that there is a ring of saboteurs and enemy agents who are trying to destroy ships carrying supplies to the troops stationed in the islands and sabotage the war effort. Though the US Navy is preparing to build a naval base on Tangita, an unknown foreign power secretly has a subterranean submarine base beneath the island with the goal of preventing the American base from being completed. He sets out with three assistants to find the mastermind behind the activities.

== Cast ==
- Don Terry as Cmdr. Don Winslow
- Walter Sande as Lt. Red Pennington
- Claire Dodd as Mercedes Colby
- Anne Nagel as Misty Gaye
- John Litel as Spencer Merlin
- Wade Boteler as Mike Splendor
- Ben Taggart as John Blake
- Kurt Katch as The Scorpion
- John Holland as Paul Barsac
- Ethan Laidlaw as Henchman Spike
- Robert Barron as Henchman Prindle
- Lane Chandler as Henchman Corley
- Dirk Thane as Lt. Cmdr. Grady
- Peter Leeds as Seaman Chapman
- Jerry Mandy as Tangita Jim [Chs. 2, 10]
- Samuel S. Hinds as Admiral Colby, The CINC-US [Ch.1]
- Herbert Rawlinson as Adm. Warburton [Ch.1]
- Arthur Loft as Tranker - Submarine Z-37 Captain [Chs. 1-2]
- Paul Bryar as Kramer - [Chs. 3-4]

== Production ==
The serial was based on the comic strip by Commander Frank V. Martinek, which was approved by the US Navy. The strip gained new meaning with the approach of World War II, which would also affect the serial: "Its presentation as a Universal serial in October 1941 - just before the infamous attack on Pearl Harbor in December - was one of the most timely contributions of the serial field."

The Universal serials for 1941-42 were meant to run: Riders of Death Valley, Sea Raiders, Head Hunters of the Amazon, Gang Busters. Head Hunters of the Amazon was, however, dropped in favor of this serial. This is possibly due to the greater name recognition of the licensed property over the more generic planned serial.

== Chapter titles ==
1. The Human Torpedo
2. Flaming Death
3. Weapons of Horror
4. Towering Doom
5. Trapped in the Dungeon
6. Menaced by Man-Eaters
7. Bombed by the Enemy
8. The Chamber of Doom
9. Wings of Destruction
10. Fighting Fathoms Deep
11. Caught in the Caverns
12. The Scorpion Strangled

_{Source:}

== Sequel ==
In 1943, a sequel, Don Winslow of the Coast Guard, was released by Universal.

== See also ==
- Don Winslow of the Navy (comic strip)
- Don Winslow of the Navy (radio program)
