= Squadron of Honor =

1938 film by Charles C. Coleman

- Directed by: Charles C. Coleman
- Written by: Michael L. Simmons; Martin Mooney
- Produced by: Irving Briskin; Ralph Cohn
- Starring: Don Terry; Mary Russell; Thurston Hall
- Cinematography: Lucien Ballard
- Edited by: Al Clark
- Music by: Morris Stoloff
- Production company: Columbia Pictures
- Distributed by: Columbia Pictures
- Release date: June 28, 1938
- Running time: 65 minutes
- Country: United States
- Language: English

Squadron of Honor is a 1938 American action film directed by Charles C. Coleman and starring Don Terry, Mary Russell, and Thurston Hall. It was produced as a second feature by Columbia Pictures. The film's sets were designed by the art director Stephen Goosson.

== Plot ==
American Legion commander Bob Metcalf and district attorney Don Blane join forces to battle a crooked operator who tries to frame Metcalf for murder. To assist him Blane calls on the help of a hundred thousand American Legion members.

== Cast ==
- Don Terry as District Attorney Don Blane
- Mary Russell as Eve Rogers
- Thurston Hall as Bob Metcalf
- Arthur Loft as Lou Tanner
- Robert Warwick as Kimball
- Marc Lawrence as Lawlor
- Dick Curtis as Craig
- George McKay as Todd
- Eddie Fetherston as Denton
- Edward LeSaint as Forsythe
- Ivan Miller as Chief Finley
- Harry Strang as Capt. Riley
- Jimmy Hollywood as Sid Hinkle
- Edward Earle as Haynes
- Jack Pennick as Elmer
- Mary Mersch as Mrs. Gobel
- John Ince as Legionnaire Commander
- William Worthington as Major
- Edmund Cobb as Policeman
- Eddie Laughton as Bookie
- George Chesebro as Legionnaire
- Tom London as Legionnaire

== Bibliography ==
- Miller, Don. "B" Movies: An Informal Survey of the American Low-budget Film, 1933-1945. Curtis Books, 1973.
