= Neenah High School =

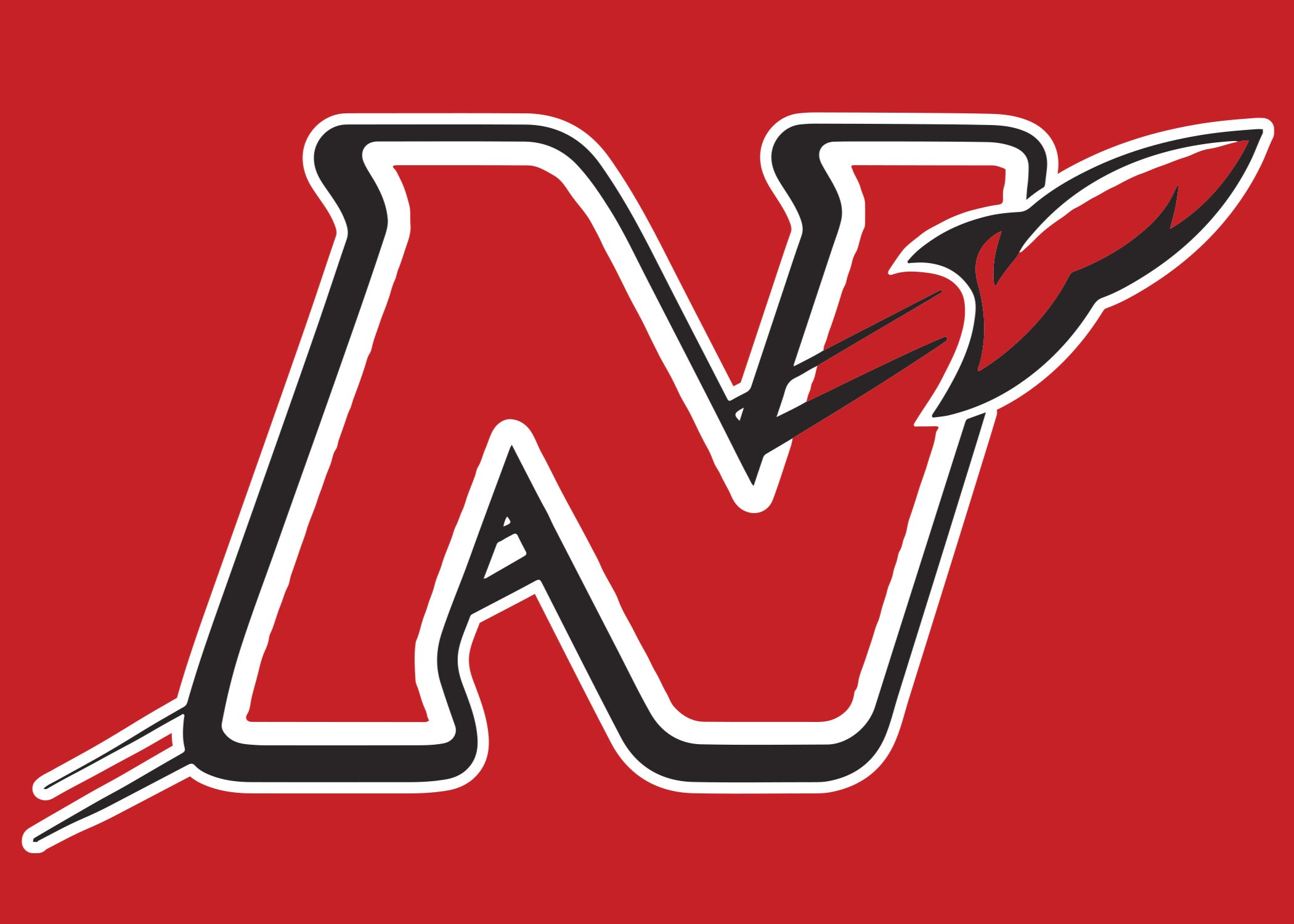

Location
- 500 Rocket Way; Neenah, Wisconsin; U.S. 44°11′45″N 88°31′08″W

Information
- Type: Public
- Established: 2023 (current), 1972, 1929, 1877
- School district: Neenah Joint S.D.
- Principal: Brian Wunderlich
- Staff: 113.80 (FTE)
- Grades: 9–12
- Enrollment: 1,944 (2023-2024)
- Student to teacher ratio: 17.08
- Colors: Red & black
- Athletics: WIAA – Div. 1
- Athletics conference: Fox Valley Association
- Mascot: Rocket
- Rivals: Menasha, Kimberly
- Newspaper: Satellite
- Yearbook: The Rocket
- Feeder schools: Neenah Middle School
- Website: Neenah High School
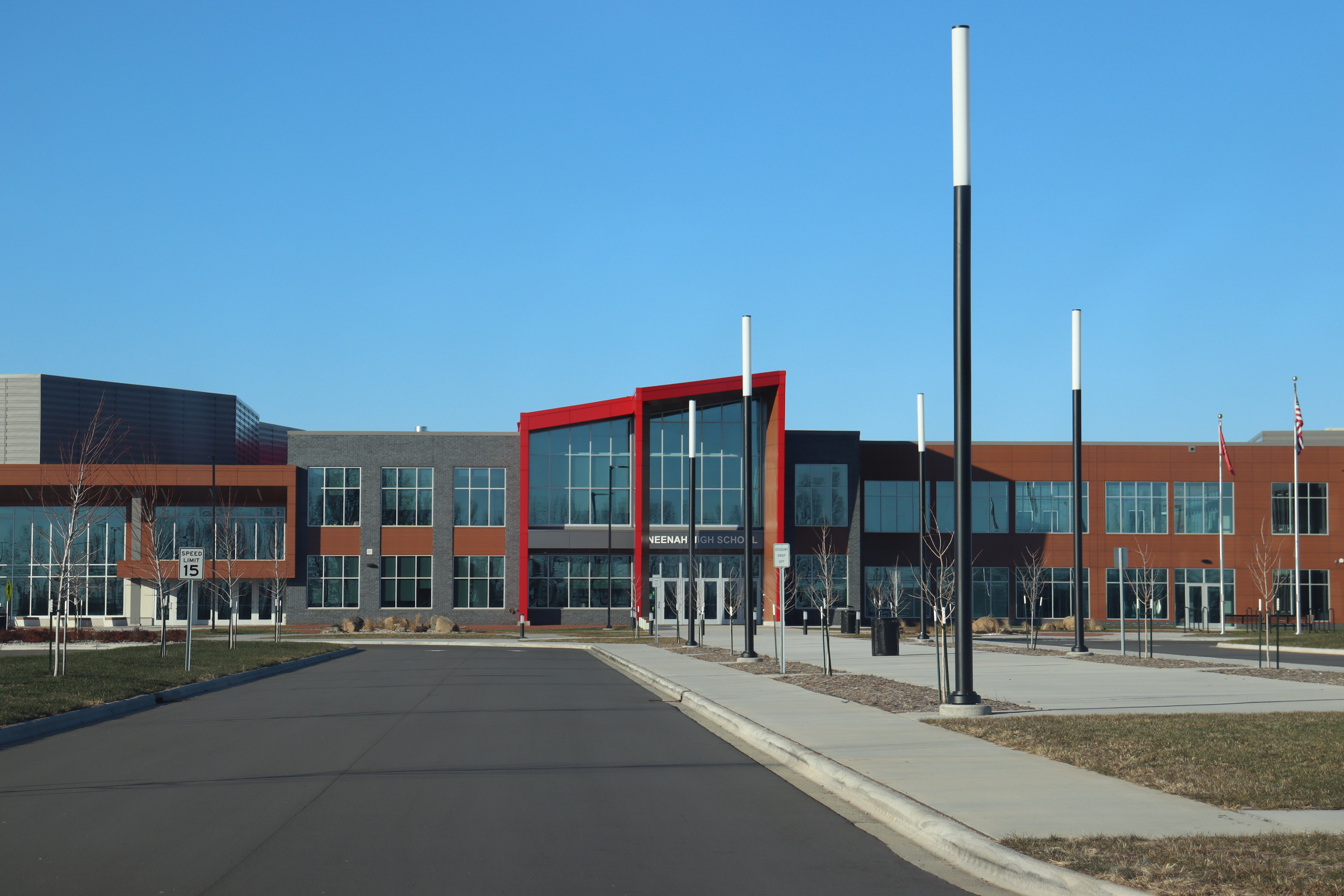
- The new campus at 500 Rocket Way

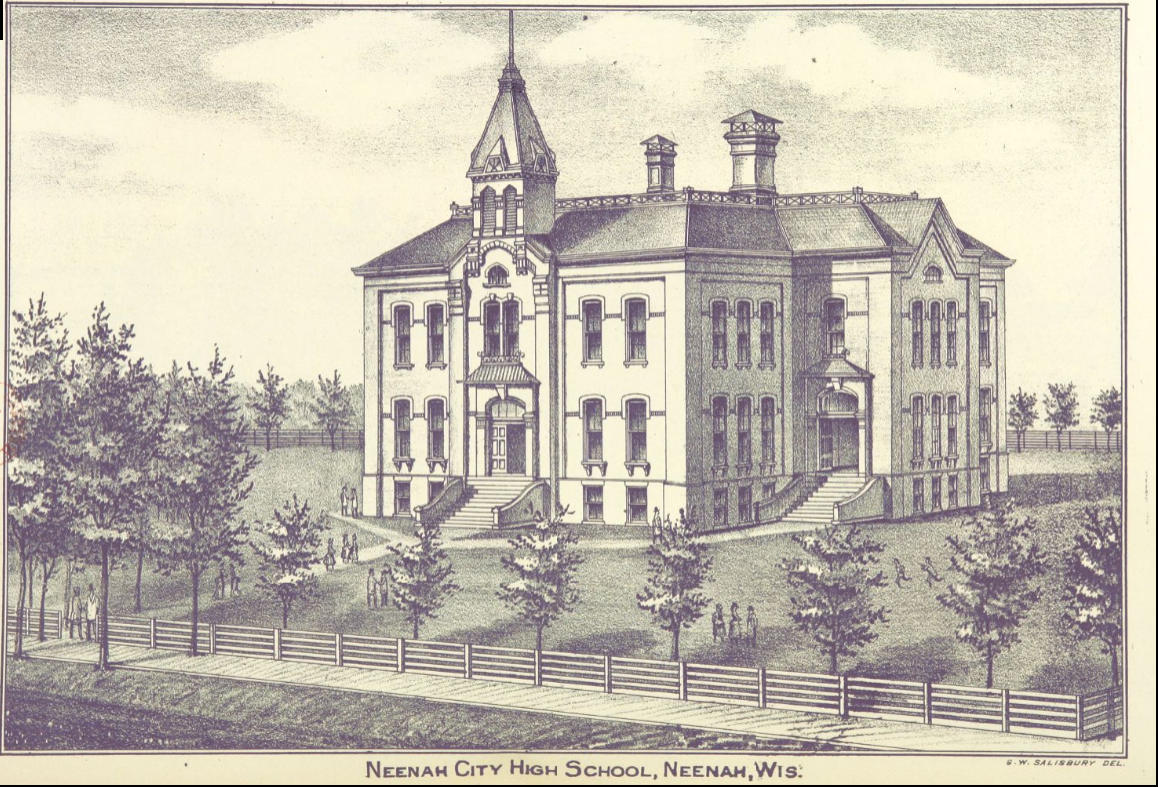
Neenah High School, 19th century.

Neenah High School is a public high school located in Neenah, Wisconsin. It is the only traditional high school of the Neenah Joint School District. As of fall 2008, approximately 2250 students were enrolled in grades 9 through 12, making it one of the largest schools in the state. The school colors are red and white and the mascot is a rocket.

== History ==
Neenah High School on Division Street (600 Elm Street, 44.178°N 88.456°W) opened in 1929 and served the community until the summer of 1972; it later became Shattuck Middle School. Originally named Armstrong High School after astronaut Neil Armstrong, the next high school building opened in the fall of 1972 at 1275 Tullar Road (44.163°N 88.497°W). A middle school (Conant Jr High School) on the same campus, constructed in the late 1960s, was made a part of Armstrong in the 1980s, prompting a name change to Neenah High School. A third building connecting the two ("The Link"), was built in the middle 1990s.

A successful 2020 referendum budgeted $115 million for a new high school to be built in the town of Neenah, although the village of Fox Crossing later annexed the land. The new high school at 500 Rocket Way opened for the 2023–2024 school year. The old high school was converted into a new middle school for grades 5–8, replacing Shattuck Middle School, which closed in June 2023, and was sold to an investor that August to be converted to residential apartments.

== Academics ==
Before the 2019–2020 school year, NHS switched from a traditional daily schedule to a block schedule. Advanced Placement classes are offered at Neenah, and about 30 percent of students take an AP exam.

== Extracurricular activities ==
=== Athletics ===
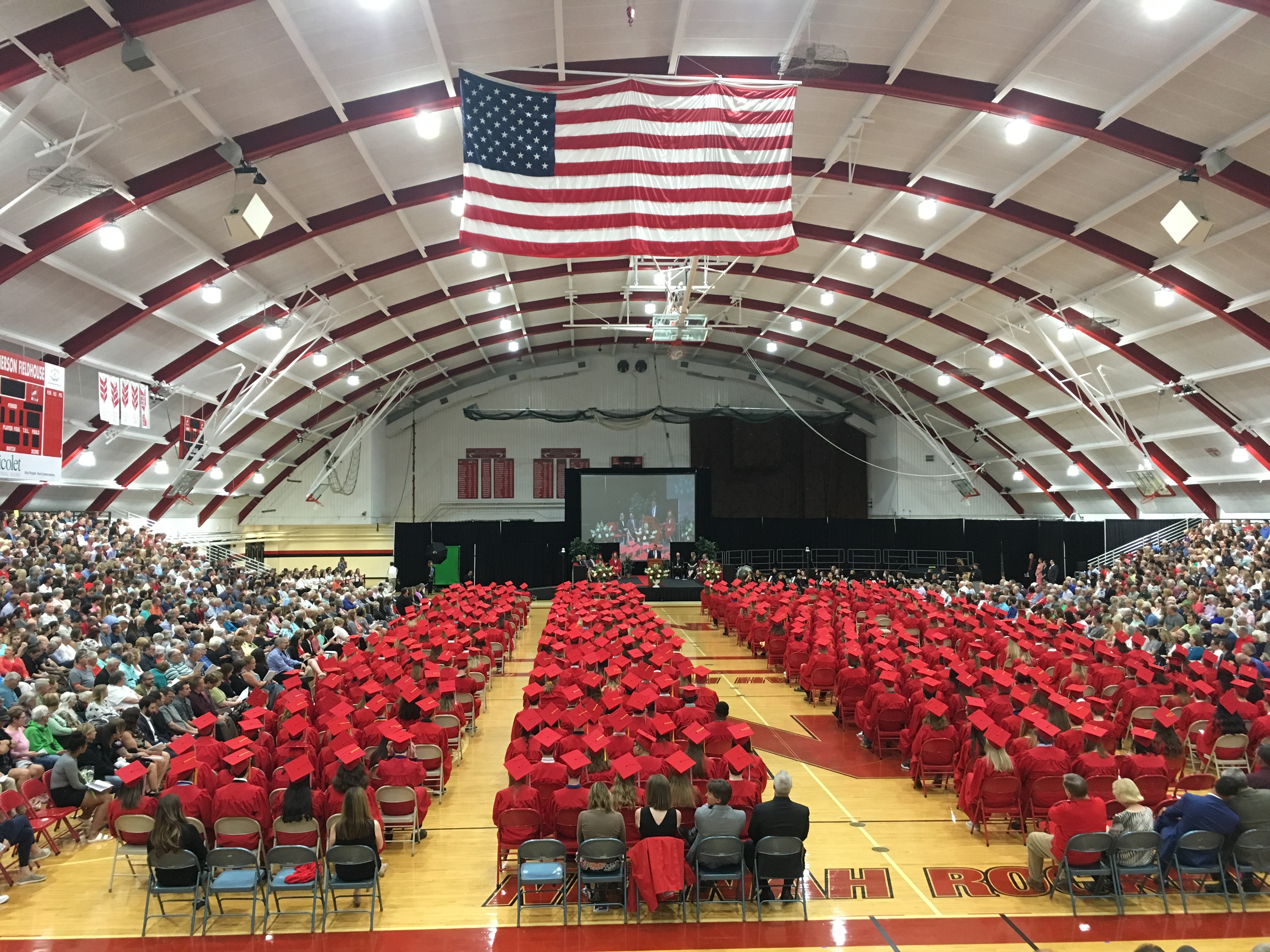
The Ron Einerson fieldhouse during the 2019 graduation ceremony.

Rockets athletic teams have a rivalry with nearby high school Kimberly. The Rockets' boys' basketball team finished second in Division I at the state basketball tournament in 2014. The team made three consecutive returns to the Division I state tournament in the 2020s, winning outright in 2022 against Brookfield Central, and losing in the first round to Arrowhead in 2023 and 2024. The Girls' Basketball team also took second in the Division I state tournament in 2024. The boys' cross country team won the state championship in 1963, and 2018.

=== Performing arts ===
Neenah has two competitive show choirs, an advanced group called Vintage and an intermediate group called Act II. Additionally, Neenah High School has one advanced orchestra group known as Touch of Class, a group which often performs around the Fox Valley and abroad. Neenah's Speech & Debate team is a founding chapter of the National Forensic League, and has earned numerous international recognitions including a National Champion.

== Media ==
Neenah High was featured on an episode of the MTV television series If You Really Knew Me which aired on Tuesday, September 14, 2010.

== Notable alumni ==
- William Draheim, Democratic and Republican state legislator
- Luke Elkin, NFL long snapper for the Chicago Bears
- Nate Gustafson, Republican state legislator
- Zuhdi Jasser, medical doctor, activist, policy board member
- Phil Johnston (filmmaker), screenwriter of Wreck-It Ralph and Zootopia
- Dick Jorgensen, NFL referee, Super Bowl XXIV
- Kris Kelderman college and professional soccer defender and head coach for the Milwaukee Panthers men's soccer team
- Max Klesmit, college basketball player
- Peter Konz, Center for the Atlanta Falcons
- Wayne Kreklow, guard for the Boston Celtics
- Suzanne Loker, professor of textile science and apparel design
- David Martin, Republican state legislator
- Frederick Petersen, physiotherapist and Republican state legislator
- John Schneller, End for the Detroit Lions
- Donna J. Seidel, police officer and Democratic state legislator
- John Harrison Wharton, architect of Intel's Intel MCS-51 instruction set
- John Whitlinger, professional tennis player and collegiate tennis coach
- Allie Ziebell, college basketball player for the Connecticut Huskies
