= Anne Korin =

Anne Korin is co-director of the Institute for the Analysis of Global Security, a think tank focused on energy and security, and chairs the Set America Free Coalition, an alliance of national security, environmental, labor and religious groups promoting ways to reduce America's dependence on foreign oil. She is co-author of Energy Security Challenges for the 21st Century (2009) and Turning Oil into Salt (2009). She appears in the media frequently and has written articles for Foreign Affairs, MIT Innovations, The American Interest and National Review.

In May 2008, Korin testified before the House Committee on Foreign Affairs.

Korin is adviser to the United States Energy Security Council.

In July 2023, Gal Luft, with whom Korin co-authored Turning Oil into Salt, and Energy Security Challenges for the 21st Century, along with several other books and articles, was indicted in the United States for acting as unregistered foreign agent, trafficking in arms, violating U.S. sanctions against Iran, and making false statements to federal Agents. Korin and Luft are co-directors of The Institute for the Analysis of Global Security.
