= Suzanne Loker =

American college professor (1948-2025)

- Born: March 28, 1948; Wisconsin, U.S.
- Died: April 12, 2025 (age 77); New York, U.S.
- Occupations: College professor, textiles scholar

Suzanne Loker (March 28, 1948 – April 12, 2025) was an American academic. She was a professor of fiber science and apparel design at Cornell University from 1998 until 2008.

== Early life and education ==
Loker was from Neenah, Wisconsin, the daughter of Harley Frederick Loker and Laura Jane Birch Loker. Her mother was a school teacher; her father was a United States Navy veteran who managed a printing business. Suzanne had 2 brothers, Rex & Stephen. She graduated Neenah High School and from the University of Wisconsin in 1970. She also earned an associate degree in apparel design at the Fashion Institute of Technology. from She earned a master's degree in clothing and textiles at Syracuse University, and, in 1982, a Ph.D. in educational psychology from Kansas State University.

== Career ==
Loker taught apparel design and merchandising courses at the University of Vermont and the University of Idaho. She was department chair at the University of Vermont, and director of the School of Family and Consumer Sciences at the University of Idaho.

Loker was a professor of fiber science and apparel design at Cornell University's College of Human Ecology, beginning in 1998. From 2000 to 2005, she was also the J. Thomas Clark Professor of Entrepreneurship and Personal Enterprise at Cornell. She helped develop the doctoral program in apparel design there, and worked with Cornell Cooperative Extension as head of the Apparel Industry Outreach, supporting small businesses in New York State. She was named a fellow of the International Textile and Apparel Association in 2007. She retired with emerita status in 2008.

== Research and publications ==
Loker's research focused on apparel design, manufacture and marketing, with special interest in home-based workers, sustainability, and technologies for customization and functionality. "Clothes that work are the wave of the future," she told an interviewer in 2003. Her work was published in academic journals including International Marketing Review, Journal of Computer-Mediated Communication, Clothing & Textiles Research Journal, Reading Psychology, Journal of Textile and Apparel Technology and Management, Journal of Management Development, International Journal of Consumer Studies, International Journal of Retail & Distribution Management, Journal of Family and Economic Issues, and Fashion Practice.

- "Does Bibliotherapy Reduce Fear Among Second-Grade Children?" (1983, with Robert C. Newhouse)
- "Characteristics and practices of home-based workers" (1992, with Elizabeth Scannell)
- "Jitex: A case study of apparel marketing in the Czech Republic" (1995)
- Garment Industry Development Corporation: A case study of a sectoral employment development approach (1999, with M. Conway)
- Gender and Home-Based Employment (2000, co-edited with Charles B. Hennon and Rosemary Walker)
- "Mass Customization: On-line Consumer Involvement in Product Design" (2002, with Narges Kamali)
- "Female Consumers’ Reactions to Body Scanning" (2004, with Lora Cowie, Susan Ashdown, and Van Dyk Lewis)
- "Mass Customization of Wedding Gowns: Design Involvement on the Internet" (2004, with Rita Choy)
- "Using 3D Scans for Fit Analysis" (2004, with Susan P. Ashdown, Katherine Schoenfelder, and Lindsay Lyman-Clarke)
- "Mass Customization and Sizing" (2007)
- "Dress in the Third Dimension: Online Interactivity and Its New Horizons" (2008, with Susan Ashdown and Erica Carnrite)
- Social Responsibility in the Global Apparel Industry (2009, with Marsha Dickson and Molly Eckman)
- "Consumer satisfaction with a mass customized Internet apparel shopping site" (2010, with Hyun-Hwa Lee, Mary L. Damhorst, J. R. Campbell and Jean L. Parsons)
- "Sustainable Clothing Care by Design" (2012, with Kathleen Dombek-Keith)
- "A model for sustainability education in support of the PRME" (2013, with Marsha A. Dickson, Molly Eckman, and Charlotte Jirousek)
- "Technology usage intent among apparel retail employees" (2014, with Tasha L. Lewis)
- "Mass-customized Target Market Sizing: Extending the Sizing Paradigm for Improved Apparel Fit" (2015, with Susan Ashdown)
- "Trying on the Future: Exploring Apparel Retail Employees’ Perspectives on Advanced In-Store Technologies" (2017, with Tasha L. Lewis)

== Personal life ==
Loker married Ronald R. Rosenblatt in 1972. She was later married to Tom Fyles. She died from cancer in 2025, at the age of 77.
