= Don Winslow of the Navy (comic strip) =

American comic strip by Frank Martinek

- Leon Beroth's Don Winslow of the Navy strip (1947).
- Author: Frank Victor Martinek
- Illustrator(s): Leon Beroth (1934 to 1952); Carl Hammond (layouts and research); Ken Ernst (1940–1942; assists and ghost art); John Jordan (1953–1955)
- Current status/schedule: Daily and Sunday; concluded
- Launch date: March 5, 1934
- End date: July 30, 1955
- Syndicate(s): Bell Syndicate (1934–1953); General Features (1953–1955)
- Genre: adventure

Don Winslow of the Navy is an American comic strip created by Frank Victor Martinek and was distributed mostly by the Bell Syndicate from 1934 to 1955. The title character was a spy-chasing lieutenant commander in Naval intelligence. The comic strip led to a radio adventure serial that began in 1937, as well as film serials that began in 1942. Original comic book stories also appeared in Fawcett Comics titles starting in 1943.

== Publication history ==
The idea for Don Winslow was conceived by Lieutenant Commander Frank V. Martinek, USNR, himself a veteran of World War I Naval intelligence, after Admiral Wat T. Cluverius complained to him about the difficulties of recruiting in the Midwest. Ruminating on the challenge, Martinek decided that a comic strip that focused on Naval tradition and courage would educate and fascinate America’s youth. He had previously used the character Don Winslow in some novels he wrote, so he had the main concept readymade. Colonel Frank Knox, later Secretary of the Navy helped sell the idea to the Bell Syndicate.

Martinek brought in Naval Lieutenant Leon Beroth as art director and Carl Hammond to handle layouts and research. Martinek articulated this central principle: "Since Don Winslow of the Navy is approved by the Navy Department, I cannot allow him to do anything that is contrary to the ideals, traditions or motives of the Navy."

The strip debuted on March 5, 1934. A Sunday page was added on April 21, 1935. Martinek supervised the daily feature’s "general tone and direction", sending the typewritten continuity to Beroth every week for illustrations. From 1934 to 1952, Beroth was the leading artist on the feature. Ken Ernst (later famous for Mary Worth), assisted or ghosted the art between 1940 and 1942. With Don leaving his fiancée behind in December 1941 to go fight the Japanese, the World War II period saw the height of Don Winslow's popularity.

The Sunday page featured several topper strips during the course of the run: Bos'n Hal (April 21, 1935-1940s), Bos'n Hal's Notebook (1936), Winslowgrams aka Don Winslow's Hero-Gram (February 9, 1936 – March 14, 1943) and Winslow's Crime Facts (June–August 1944).

The Bell-McClure Syndicate dropped the strip in 1953, and it was picked up by General Features, where it was illustrated by John Jordan. The strip finally came to a close on Saturday, July 30, 1955.

== Story and characters ==
Don's best pal throughout the run of the series was the somewhat chubby Red Pennington. His commanding officer for a time was Admiral Colby. Mercedes Colby, the Admiral's daughter, was Don's romantic interest for the first half of the narrative, from 1935 to 1946. Mercedes was a war nurse and in a rare instance of realism returned to the states in 1944 suffering from "war trauma." Jane Steele, a captain in the WAVES, was introduced in 1951, and Don's sister Mary Winlsow was incorporated in 1952.

Don's primary nemesis was The Scorpion. He opposed Don from the very beginning of the comic strip, often behind the scenes and unseen for long periods of time, as the head of a global, extra-national organization of espionage and sabotage called Scorpia. Time in Tibet allowed him to develop a variety of abilities, including on at least two occasions having his spirit leave his body and permanently possess another new one. He had a daughter, Madame Mask (1937, 1950), who was just as evil but not quite as persistent. The Scorpion favored beautiful associates, including Lotus (1934–36, 1941, 1943) who later reformed; Tasmia (1936–37, 1940, 1946); and Asmara (1940–42). Agents of Scorpia in the 1930s included the Crocodile (1936), Dr. Thor (1937), and the Duchess (1937); in the 1940s, The Duster (1948), the Polecat (1948), and Cold Shivers (1949); and in the 1950s: Half-Dome (1951), Eight Ball (1951), and the Red Vulture (1952). Efforts to create new menaces other than Scorpia were generally short-lived, but included Owl-Eyes (1939, 1949), and clandestine organizations such as The Panther's Claw (1943) and the Clenched Fist (1944).

== Legacy ==
Although created primarily as a Navy recruitment and propaganda tool, the strip received high marks from Coulton Waugh for “excellent suspense, and ingenious, spine-joggling situations.” Ron Goulart credits Don Winslow with "intrigue, spychasing, beautiful women, and villains with names like Dr. Centaur, the Dwarf, and the Scorpion."

== Comic books ==
Don Winslow of the Navy
- Dell's Mammoth Comics (1938)

Publication information
- Publisher: Merwil; Dell Comics; Fawcett Comics; Charlton Comics
- First appearance: 1934
- Created by: Frank Victor Martinek and Leon Beroth

In-story information
- Team affiliations: Naval intelligence
Don Winslow of the Navy
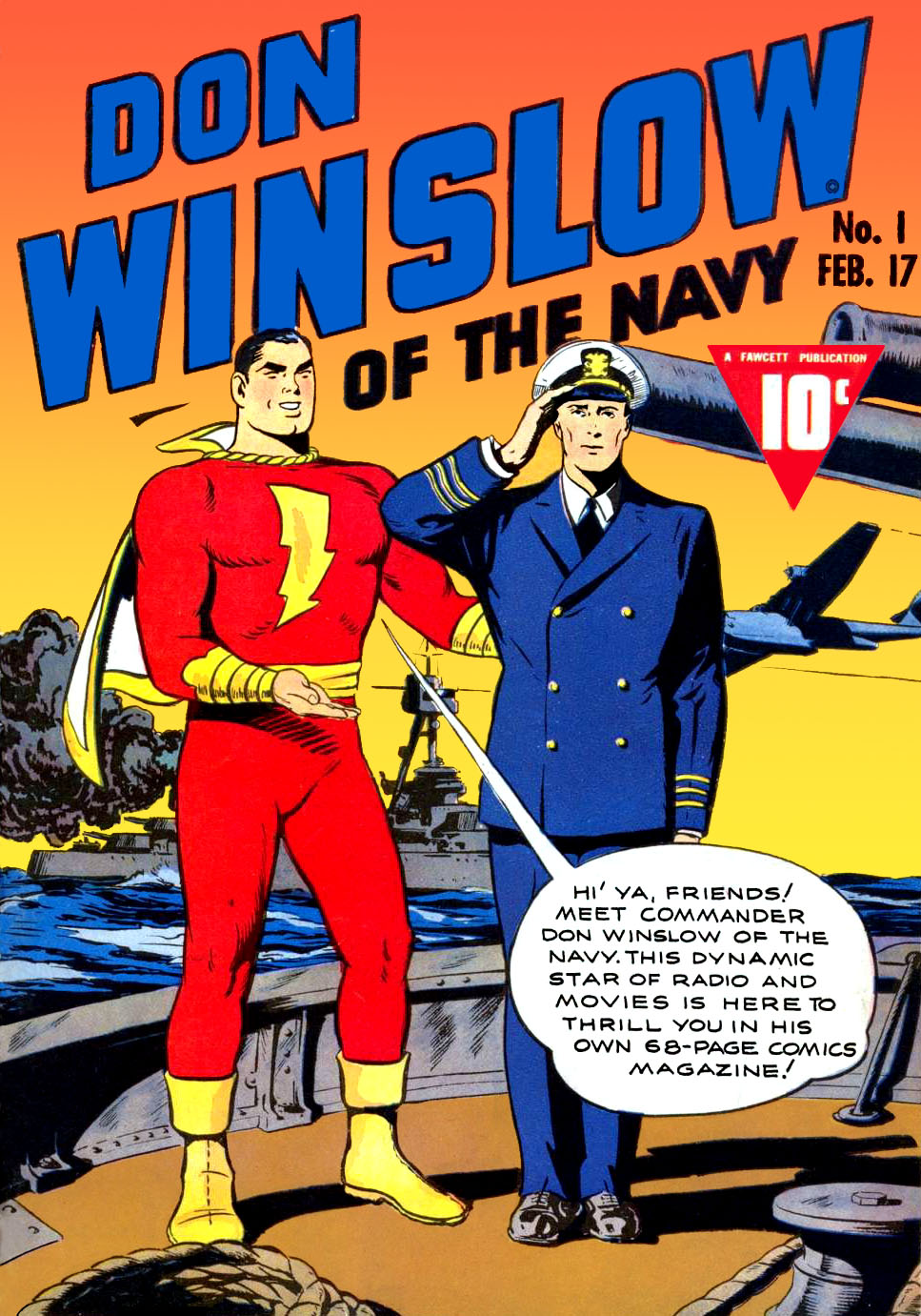
- Captain Marvel introduces Commander Don Winslow.
Publication information
- Publisher: Fawcett Comics
- Format: Standard Golden Age
- Genre: Adventure
- Publication date: 1943 – 1951
- No. of issues: 69
- Main character(s): Don Winslow; Red Pennington; Admiral Colby; Mercedes Colby

Following up on the success of the comic strip, reprints of the feature in comic book form appeared from various publishers. Merwil, a small publisher, offered reprints in 1937. In 1938 Dell Comics began reprinting the newspaper strips in Crackajack Funnies alongside other established newspaper features. When that title ceased publication in 1942, Don Winslow reprints begin running in Popular Comics, again with other strip favorites of the era. In addition, Dell also had Don Winslow in two issues of their Four Color Comics, a series which spotlighted a different character with nearly every issue. Dell's 1938 one-shot, Famous Feature Stories, contained more Winslow.

Fawcett Comics released the Don Winslow of the Navy comic book with original stories beginning in 1943. The cover of the first issue shows Captain Marvel introducing the character to the readers. This series lasted until 1948, then was revived in 1951, for a total to 69 issues. Winslow was revived again for a final brief time starting in 1955 in reprints published by Charlton Comics.

== In other media ==
=== Film serials ===
- Don Winslow of the Navy (1942)
- Don Winslow of the Coast Guard (1943)

=== Radio program ===
- Don Winslow of the Navy
