= Don Winslow of the Navy (radio program) =

American old-time radio juvenile adventure serial

- Genre: Juvenile adventure serial
- Running time: 15 minutes
- Country of origin: United States
- Language: English
- Syndicates: Blue Network
- Starring: Bob Guilbert; Raymond Edward Johnson; Edward Davison; John Gibson
- Written by: Albert Aley; Al Barker
- Directed by: Ray Kremer
- Original release: October 19, 1937 – January 1, 1943
- Sponsored by: Kellogg's; Bristol-Myers Inc. General Foods

Don Winslow of the Navy was an American old-time radio juvenile adventure serial. It was broadcast on the Blue Network from October 19, 1937, until May 26, 1939, and was revived for a second run from October 5, 1942, until January 1, 1943.

== Format ==
Don Winslow of the Navy was based on the comic strip of the same name, which was created by Frank V. Martinek. The title character was a commander in U.S. Naval Intelligence who "conducted a never-ending war through many of the chapters with a diabolical crime czar identified simply as the Scorpion." In addition to the Scorpion, he "fought other subversive types whose scheming could lead to control of the universe."

Joel H. Spring, in his book, Images of American Life: A History of Ideological Management in Schools, Movies, Radio, and Television, pointed out the significance of the program beyond the level of entertainment: "The popular Don Winslow of the Navy carried a patriotic message in its programs ..." Moreover, he noted that the Scorpion was more than just an opponent in a story; the creed for the program's Squadron of Peace for listeners specified that the battle against Scorpion "represents the battle between Good and Evil."

The program's scripts, which contained much naval terminology, were checked for authenticity by the U.S. Navy.

== Critical reaction ==
In 1937, the trade publication Radio Daily described Don Winslow of the Navy as "... one of the best and most wholesome in the action and thrill category for juvenile listeners."

In contrast, a reviewer for another trade publication, Billboard, panned a later episode of the program in the magazine's October 17, 1942, issue. The review said, in part:

Don Winslow of the Navy is introduced with a big build-up, airplane motors roaring, shouts like "Stand by for action and adventure," "All hands on deck for Don Winslow," salutes for the men of the Navy Air Corps 00 but what a letdown when the guy finally makes his appearance. [The program] was disappointingly unexciting and quiet.

== Personnel ==
The title role was played by Bob Guilbert in the 1930s version, and Raymond Edward Johnson had the role in the 1940s version. Lieutenant Red Pennington was played by Edward Davison (1930s) and John Gibson (1940s). The supporting cast included Ruth Barth, Betty Lou Gerson, Betty Ito, and Lenore Kingston.

The director was Ray Kremer. Albert Aley and Al Barker were writers.

== Squadron of Peace ==
Listeners of Don Winslow of the Navy could join its Squadron of Peace club, which enabled them to aid Winslow in his missions. The club's creed began and ended as shown in this excerpt: "I consecrate my life to Peace and the protecting of all my Countrymen wherever they may be. ... Love your country, its flag and all the things for which it stands. Follow the advice of your parents and superiors and help someone every day."

== Promotions ==
In 1938, Kellogg's Wheat Krispies, which sponsored Don Winslow of the Navy, came out with a newly designed package as a tie-in with the program. An item in the trade publication Broadcasting reported, "The package front depicts a naval officer and a row of signal flags, while the rear of the box pictures a U.S. battleship with descriptions of the ship's functions."

== Sales for home use ==
In the 1970s, Don Winslow of the Navy was one of a number of old-time radio programs re-issued as George Garabedian Productions by MARK56 Records on long-playing records for purchasers to enjoy in their homes.
