= Loker Hydrocarbon Research Institute =

Institute in Los Angeles, California, US

Coordinates: 34.0193°N 118.2874°W

Loker Hydrocarbon Research Institute is on the campus of the University of Southern California. G. K. Surya Prakash serves as the Director and holds the George A. and Judith A. Olah Nobel Laureate Chair of Chemistry.

The institute conducts research in polymer science, materials chemistry, and hydrocarbon chemistry.
